= List of military museums =

A military museum or war museum is an institution dedicated to the preservation and education of the significance of wars, conflicts, and military actions. These museums serve as repositories of artifacts (not least weapons), documents, photographs, and other memorabilia related to the military and war. Some of these institutions may also be used as a war memorial for a particular country or conflict.

These institutions vary in their scope and focus, with some museums dedicated to a specific national or regional context and chronicling the military history of a particular country or region, while other museums may concentrate on a particular conflict, era, service, technology (like an artillery museum), or unit (like a regimental museum).

The following is a list of military museums by country:

== Austria ==
- Museum of Military History, Vienna
- Styrian Armoury

== Australia ==
- Army Museum Bandiana
- Army Museum of Tasmania
- Army Museum of Western Australia
- Australian Armour and Artillery Museum
- Australian Army Artillery Museum
- Australian War Memorial
- Bublacowie Military Museum
- Darwin Military Museum
- Fighter World
- Fleet Air Arm Museum (Australia)
- Gippsland Armed Forces Museum
- Light Horse & Field Artillery Museum
- Lithgow Small Arms Factory Museum
- Maryborough Military and Colonial Museum
- National Military Vehicle Museum
- National Vietnam Veterans Museum
- RAAF Museum
- RAAF Wagga Heritage Centre
- Royal Australian Armoured Corps Memorial and Army Tank Museum
- Royal Australian Navy Heritage Centre

== Bangladesh ==
- Bangladesh Military Museum
- Liberation War Museum

== Belgium ==
- Atlantic Wall open-air museum
- In Flanders Fields Museum
- Lange Max Museum
- Memorial Museum Passchendaele 1917
- National Museum of the Resistance
- Royal Museum of the Armed Forces and Military History
- Sanctuary Wood Museum Hill 62

== Bulgaria ==
- National Museum of Military History, Bulgaria
- Pleven Panorama

== Canada ==
- Base Borden Military Museum
- Bomber Command Museum of Canada
- Canadian War Museum
- Canadian Warplane Heritage Museum
- Chinese Canadian Military Museum Society
- Cold Lake Air Force Museum
- Commonwealth Air Training Plan Museum
- Comox Air Force Museum
- Elgin Military Museum
- Fort Garry Horse Museum & Archives
- Greenwood Military Aviation Museum
- Hastings and Prince Edward Regiment Museum
- Military Communications and Electronics Museum
- Musée de la Défense aérienne
- National Air Force Museum of Canada
- Naval Museum of Halifax
- Naval Museum of Manitoba
- Queen's Own Cameron Highlanders of Canada Museum
- Royal Canadian Artillery Museum
- Royal Canadian Regiment Museum
- Royal Military College of Canada Museum
- Secrets of Radar Museum
- Shearwater Aviation Museum
- Swords and Ploughshares Museum
- The Military Museums

== China ==
- Memorial of the War to Resist US Aggression and Aid Korea
- Military Museum of the Chinese People's Revolution
- Museum of the War of Chinese People's Resistance Against Japanese Aggression
- Opium War Museum

=== Hong Kong ===
- Hong Kong Museum of Coastal Defence

== Czech Republic ==
- Military Museum Lešany
- Museum of armoured vehicles Smržovka

== Denmark ==
- Danish War Museum
- Defence and Garrison Museum
- Royal Danish Naval Museum
- Sea War Museum Jutland

== El Salvador ==
- Military Museum of the Armed Forces of El Salvador

== Estonia ==
- Naissaar Museum
- Estonian Aviation Museum
- Museum of Fight for Estonia's Freedom
- Estonian War Museum
- Valga sõjamuuseum

== Finland ==
- The Artillery Museum of Finland
- Engineers Museum
- Finnish Air Force Museum
- Military Museum of Finland
- Military Music Museum of Finland
- Parola Tank Museum
- Salpa Line Museum

== France ==
- Airborne Museum (Sainte-Mère-Église)
- Army Museum (Paris)
- Bullecourt 1917, Jean and Denise Letaille museum
- Carrière Wellington
- Centre de la mémoire d'Oradour
- Foreign Legion Museum
- Juno Beach Centre
- Mémorial de Caen
- Musée de l'Ordre de la Libération
- Musée de la Résistance et de la Déportation à Grenoble
- Musée des Blindés
- Musée des Plans-Reliefs
- Musée du Général Leclerc de Hauteclocque et de la Libération de Paris – Musée Jean Moulin
- Musée Pierre-Jost
- Museum of the Great War
- National Gendarmerie Museum
- Overlord Museum
- Salle des Traditions de la Garde Républicaine

== Germany ==
- Allied Museum
- Bayerisches Armeemuseum
- Bundeswehr Military History Museum
  - Militärhistorisches Museum Flugplatz Berlin-Gatow
- Bundeswehr Museum of German Defense Technology
- Dresden Armoury
- German Tank Museum
- Historical Technical Museum, Peenemünde
- Siegfried Line Museum, Irrel
- Siegfried Line Museum, Pirmasens
- Wehrgeschichtliches Museum Rastatt

== Greece ==
- 1912–1913 War Museum
- Athens War Museum
- Balkan Wars Museum
- Hellenic Air Force Museum
- Kilkis War Museum
- Lachanas Military Museum
- Museum for the Macedonian Struggle (Thessaloniki)
- Museum of the Battle of Crete and the National Resistance
- Museum of the Kalavryta Holocaust
- Museum of the Macedonian Struggle (Kastoria)
- Pavlos Melas Museum
- War Museum of Kalpaki
- War Museum of Thessaloniki

== India ==
- Cavalry Tank Museum, Ahmednagar
- Indian Air Force Heritage Museum, Chandigarh
- Indian Air Force Museum, Palam
- Indian War Memorial Museum
- Jaisalmer War Museum
- Naval Aircraft Museum (Kolkata)
- Naval Aviation Museum (Goa)
- Samudrika Naval Marine Museum

== Indonesia ==
- Bojong Kokosan Museum
- Dharma Wiratama Museum
- Satriamandala Museum

== Iran ==
- Holy Defense Museum

== Ireland ==
- County Carlow Military Museum
- Curragh Military Museum

== Israel ==
- Clandestine Immigration and Naval Museum
- Etzel House
- Israel Defense Forces History Museum
- Israeli Air Force Museum
- Palmach Museum
- Yad La-Shiryon
- Yad Vashem

== Italy ==
- Italian Air Force Museum
- Museo della Deportazione
- Museum of the Liberation of Rome
- Museum of the Risorgimento, Bologna
- Museum of the Risorgimento (Milan)
- Museum of the Risorgimento (Turin)
- Stibbert Museum
- Technical Naval Museum at La Spezia

== Japan ==
- Bansei Tokkō Peace Museum
- Center of the Tokyo Raids and War Damage
- Chiran Peace Museum for Kamikaze Pilots
- Gifu Sekigahara Battlefield Memorial Museum
- Hiroshima Peace Memorial Museum
- Japanese Sword Museum
- JMSDF Kure Museum
- Kaiten Memorial Museum
- Kakamigahara Air and Space Museum
- Nagasaki Atomic Bomb Museum
- Peace Museum of Saitama
- Yokaren Peace Memorial Museum
- Yūshūkan

== Jordan ==
- Royal Tank Museum

== Malaysia ==
- War Museum of Batu Maung
- The Army Museum of Port Dickson
- Royal Malaysian Air Force Museum in Kuala Lumpur
- Royal Malaysian Navy Museum in Melaka
- Malaysian Armed Forces Museum in Kuala Lumpur

== Netherlands ==
- Airborne Museum 'Hartenstein'
- Dutch Cavalry Museum
- Dutch Fortress Museum
- Dutch Navy Museum
- Freedom Museum
- Marechaussee Museum
- Militaire Luchtvaart Museum
- Nationaal Militair Museum
- Netherlands Marine Corps Museum
- Overloon War Museum
- Verzetsmuseum

== New Zealand ==
- Air Force Museum of New Zealand
- National Army Museum (New Zealand)
- New Zealand Fighter Pilots Museum
- Torpedo Bay Navy Museum

== North Korea ==
- Memorial Museum of Combat Feats at the Overseas Military Operations
- Sinchon Museum of American War Atrocities
- Victorious War Museum

== Norway ==
- Blood Road Museum
- Armed Forces Museum (Norway)
- Kristiansand Cannon Museum
- Lofoten War Memorial Museum
- Norway's Resistance Museum
- Norwegian Armed Forces Aircraft Collection
- Royal Norwegian Navy Museum
- Rustkammeret

== Philippines ==
- Armed Forces of the Philippines Museum
- Philippine Air Force Aerospace Museum
- Philippine Army Museum

== Poland ==
- Armia Krajowa Museum in Kraków
- Armored Weaponry Museum, Poznań
- Army Museum in Białystok
- Mausoleum of Struggle and Martyrdom
- Museum of Polish Arms
- Museum of the Armed Act
- Museum of the Second World War
- Norwegian POW Museum
- Polish Army Museum
  - Katyń Museum
  - Museum of Polish Military Technology
- Warsaw Rising Museum
- White Eagle Museum

== Romania ==
- National Military Museum, Romania
- National Museum of Romanian Aviation
- Timișoara Military Museum

== Russia ==
- Central Air Force Museum
- Central Armed Forces Museum
- Central Naval Museum
- Kremlin Armoury
- Kronstadt Naval Museum
- Kubinka Tank Museum
- Military Historical Museum of Artillery, Engineers and Signal Corps
- Military History Museum of the Far Eastern Military District
- Museum of Russian Submarine Forces
- Museum of the Great Patriotic War, Moscow
- Ratnaya Palata
- Russian Museum of Military Medicine
- Taganrog military museum

== Serbia ==
- Military Museum, Belgrade

== Singapore ==
- Changi Chapel and Museum
- Reflections at Bukit Chandu
- Singapore Air Force Museum

== South Africa ==
- Anglo-Boer War Museum
- Queen's Fort Military Museum
- South African Air Force Museum
- South African National Museum of Military History
- South African Naval Museum

== South Korea ==
- Baekje Military Museum
- Jeju 4.3 Peace Park
- Nakdong River Battle Museum
- War Memorial of Korea

== Spain ==
- Cartagena Naval Museum
- Historical Military Museum of Cartagena (Spain)
- Museum of the Army (Toledo)
- Naval Museum of Madrid
- Royal Armoury of Madrid

== Sweden ==
- Hamn (museum)
- Livrustkammaren
- Marinmuseum
- Swedish Air Force Museum
- Swedish Army Museum
- Swedish Tank Museum Arsenalen

== Switzerland ==
- Flieger Flab Museum, Dübendorf
- Tank Museum, Thun
- Swiss Military Museum, Full-Reuenthal

== Taiwan ==
- August 23 Artillery Battle Museum
- Chengkungling History Museum
- Guningtou Battle Museum
- Hsinchu Museum of Military Dependents Village
- Hujingtou Battle Museum
- Republic of China Air Force Museum
- Republic of China Armed Forces Museum
- Yu Da Wei Xian Sheng Memorial Museum

== Thailand ==
- JEATH War Museum
- Royal Thai Air Force Museum

== Turkey ==
- Ankara Aviation Museum
- İnciraltı Sea Museum
- İnönü Military Quarter and War Museum
- Istanbul Aviation Museum
- Istanbul Military Museum
- Istanbul Naval Museum
- Kabatepe
- Kırıkkale MKE Weapons Industry Museum
- Mersin Naval Museum
- Victory Museum

== Ukraine ==
- Museum of Partisan Glory
- National Museum of the History of Ukraine in the Second World War
- National Museum-Preserve of Ukrainian military achievements
- Naval museum complex Balaklava
- Poltava Museum of Long-Range and Strategic Aviation
- Strategic missile forces museum in Ukraine
- Suvorov Museum, Timanivka

== United Kingdom ==
- 100th Bomb Group Memorial Museum
- Aldershot Military Museum
- Army Flying Museum
- Cheshire Military Museum
- Combined Military Services Museum
- Devonport Naval Heritage Centre
- Eden Camp Museum
- Explosion Museum of Naval Firepower
- Firing Line: Cardiff Castle Museum of the Welsh Soldier
- Fleet Air Arm Museum
- Fusilier Museum
- Fusiliers Museum of Northumberland
- Green Howards Regimental Museum
- Gordon Highlanders Museum
- Honourable Artillery Company Museum
- HorsePower: The Museum of the King's Royal Hussars
- Imperial War Museum
  - Churchill War Rooms
  - Imperial War Museum Duxford
  - Imperial War Museum North
- Jewish Military Museum
- Kent Battle of Britain Museum
- Lancashire Infantry Museum
- Lincolnshire Aviation Heritage Centre
- Lowestoft War Memorial Museum
- Military Wireless Museum in the Midlands
- Monmouth Regimental Museum
- Montrose Air Station Heritage Centre
- Muckleburgh Collection
- Museum of Lancashire
- Museum of Army Transport
- Museum of Military Medicine
- Museum of the Adjutant General's Corps
- National Army Museum
- National Museum of the Royal Navy
- National Museum of the Royal Navy, Portsmouth
- Norfolk Tank Museum
- National War Museum
- Parachute Regiment and Airborne Forces Museum
- RAF Air Defence Radar Museum
- Regimental Museum of The Royal Welsh
- REME Museum
- Royal Air Force Museum
  - Royal Air Force Museum Cosford
  - Royal Air Force Museum London
- Royal Armouries Museum
- Royal Army Chaplains' Museum
- Royal Artillery Museum
- Royal Engineers Museum
- Royal Green Jackets (Rifles) Museum
- Royal Irish Fusiliers Museum
- Royal Logistic Corps Museum
- Royal Marines Museum
- Royal Navy Submarine Museum
- Royal Regiment of Fusiliers Museum (Royal Warwickshire)
- Royal Scots Dragoon Guards Museum
- Royal Signals Museum
- Royal Welch Fusiliers Museum
- Scottish Submarine Centre
- Soldiers of Gloucestershire Museum
- Soldiers of Oxfordshire Museum
- Shoreham Aircraft Museum
- Somerset Military Museum
- Somme Heritage Centre
- Staffordshire Regiment Museum
- Stratford Armouries
- Tangmere Military Aviation Museum
- The D-Day Story
- The Guards Museum
- The Gurkha Museum
- The Museum of Technology
- The Museum of the Royal Scots (The Royal Regiment) and the Royal Regiment of Scotland
- The Queen's Own Hussars Museum
- The Queen's Own Royal West Kent Regiment Museum
- The Rifles Berkshire and Wiltshire Museum
- The Rifles Museum
- The Royal Lancers and Nottinghamshire Yeomanry Museum
- The Second World War Experience Centre
- The Tank Museum
- Trenchard Museum
- Yorkshire Air Museum

== United States ==
- 1st Infantry Division Museum
- 82nd Airborne Division War Memorial Museum
- African American Civil War Memorial Museum
- African American Military History Museum
- Air Force Armament Museum
- Air Force Flight Test Museum
- Airborne & Special Operations Museum
- American Airpower Museum
- American Civil War Museum
- American Heritage Museum
- Arkansas Air & Military Museum
- Arkansas National Guard Museum
- Armed Forces History Museum
- Atlanta Cyclorama & Civil War Museum
- Averasboro Battlefield and Museum
- B-36 Peacemaker Museum
- Barksdale Global Power Museum
- Battlefield Vegas
- Battleship New Jersey Museum and Memorial
- Blue and Gray Museum (Alabama)
- Braddock's Battlefield History Center
- Bristol Train of Artillery Museum
- Buffalo Soldiers National Museum
- CAF Rocky Mountain Wing Museum
- California State Military Museum
- Camp Gordon Johnston Museum
- Cape Canaveral Space Force Museum
- Castle Air Museum
- Champlin Fighter Museum
- Chennault Aviation and Military Museum
- Civil War Museum (Bardstown)
- Civil War Museum of Philadelphia
- Combat Air Museum
- Corporal Larry E. Smedley National Vietnam War Museum
- Eldred World War II Museum
- Estrella Warbird Museum
- Evansville Wartime Museum
- Fagen Fighters WWII Museum
- Flying Heritage & Combat Armor Museum
- Flying Leatherneck Aviation Museum
- Indiana Military Museum
- G.A.R. Hall and Museum
- Grissom Air Museum
- Hampton Roads Naval Museum
- Harbor Defense Museum
- Hawthorne Ordnance Museum
- Heartland Museum of Military Vehicles
- Hessian Powder Magazine
- Hill Aerospace Museum
- Iron Building (Watervliet Arsenal)
- Lewis Army Museum
- J. M. Davis Arms and Historical Museum
- Loring Military Heritage Center
- Maine Military Museum
- Malmstrom Museum
- MAPS Air Museum
- Marine Corps Legacy Museum
- Marine Corps Museum
- Marine Raider Museum
- McChord Air Museum
- MCRD San Diego Command Museum
- Military Aviation Museum
- Military Heritage & Aviation Museum
- Military Museum of Butte County
- Military Museum of North Florida
- Military Sea Services Museum
- Military Vehicle Technology Foundation
- Milwaukee County War Memorial
- Minnesota Military Museum
- Mississippi Armed Forces Museum
- Motts Military Museum
- Museum of Aviation
- Museum of Missouri Military History
- Museum of the American Revolution
- Museum of the Marine
- Museum of Weapons and Early American History
- National Atomic Testing Museum
- National Civil War Museum
- National Civil War Naval Museum
- National Firearms Museum
- National Guard Memorial Museum
- National Guard Militia Museum of New Jersey
- National Infantry Museum
- National Museum of American Jewish Military History
- National Museum of Civil War Medicine
- National Museum of Military Vehicles
- National Museum of the American Sailor
- National Museum of the Civil War Soldier
- National Museum of the Marine Corps
- National Museum of the Mighty Eighth Air Force
- National Museum of the Pacific War
- National Museum of the United States Air Force
- National Museum of the United States Army
- National Museum of the United States Navy
- National Museum of World War II Aviation
- National Naval Aviation Museum
- National Navy UDT-SEAL Museum
- National Veterans Memorial and Museum
- National Warplane Museum
- National World War I Museum and Memorial
- National WWII Museum
- Naval Air Museum Barbers Point
- Naval Air Station Wildwood Aviation Museum
- Naval Museum of Armament & Technology
- Naval War College Museum
- New England Civil War Museum
- New Jersey Naval Museum
- Oregon Military Museum
- Parris Island Museum
- Patriots Point
- Patuxent River Naval Air Museum
- Pearl Harbor Aviation Museum
- Pennsylvania Military Museum
- Peterson Air and Space Museum
- Polish Home Army Museum, Orchard Lake, Michigan
- Portsmouth Naval Shipyard Museum
- Powder Magazine (Charleston, South Carolina)
- Pritzker Military Museum & Library
- Puget Sound Coast Artillery Museum
- Ropkey Armor Museum
- Russell Military Museum
- Saginaw Valley Naval Ship Museum
- Seabee Museum and Memorial Park
- Selfridge Military Air Museum
- Silent Wings Museum
- Soldiers and Sailors Memorial Hall and Museum
- South Carolina Confederate Relic Room & Military Museum
- Spanish Military Hospital Museum
- Springfield Armory
- Submarine Force Library and Museum
- Texas Civil War Museum
- Texas Military Forces Museum
- The International Museum of World War II
- Travis Air Force Base Aviation Museum
- Tri-State Warbird Museum
- United States Army Aviation Museum
- U.S. Army Heritage and Education Center
- U.S. Army Museum of Hawaii
- U.S. Army Quartermaster Museum
- U.S. Cavalry Museum
- U.S. Naval Academy Museum
- United States Army Medical Department Museum
- United States Army Ordnance Training and Heritage Center
- United States Army Women's Museum
- United States Naval Shipbuilding Museum
- United States Naval Undersea Museum
- USAF Airman Heritage Museum
- USS Constitution Museum
- USS Midway Museum
- Valiant Air Command Warbird Museum
- Veterans National Memorial Shrine and Museum
- Virginia War Museum
- War Between the States Museum
- War of 1812 Museum (Plattsburgh)
- Washington National Guard Museum
- Wings of Freedom Aviation Museum
- Wisconsin Veterans Museum
- WWII/Korea LVT Museum

== Uruguay ==
- Naval Museum of Uruguay

== Vietnam ==
- B-52 Victory Museum, Hanoi
- Southeastern Armed Forces Museum Military Zone 7
- Vietnam Military History Museum
- Vietnam People's Air Force Museum, Hanoi
- Vietnam People's Air Force Museum, Ho Chi Minh City
- War Remnants Museum
- Zone 5 Military Museum, Danang

== See also ==
- List of museums
- List of Holocaust memorials and museums
- Lists of war monuments and memorials
- National Museum of Military History (disambiguation)
- Peace museum
