= The Fighting Cub =

1925 silent film

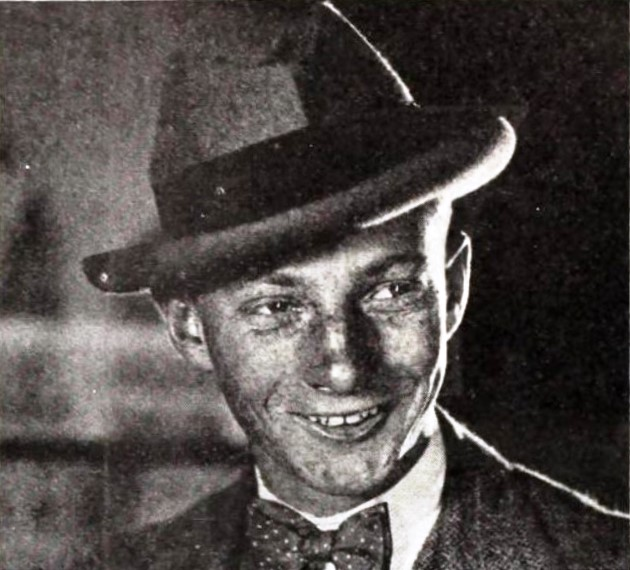
- Still with Wesley Barry
- Directed by: Paul Hurst
- Written by: Adele Buffington
- Starring: Wesley Barry; Mildred Harris; Pat O'Malley
- Cinematography: Frank Cotner; Lee Humiston
- Production company: Crown Productions
- Distributed by: Truart Film Corporation; Butcher's Film Service (UK)
- Release date: July 27, 1925
- Running time: 62 minutes
- Country: United States
- Language: Silent (English intertitles)

The Fighting Cub is a 1925 American silent drama film directed by Paul Hurst and starring Wesley Barry, Mildred Harris, and Pat O'Malley. In 1926 it was released in Britain under the alternative title of Son o' Mine.

== Plot summary ==
In this modest drama, a determined copy boy achieves his aspiration of becoming a journalist after unearthing the hideout of a criminal gang. Renowned young actor Wesley Barry takes on the role of the persistent copy boy, who consistently seeks opportunities to report from the city editor. He's finally given an opportunity with a condition: he must secure an interview with a reclusive philanthropist known for evading the media. With the assistance of Mildred Harris, the philanthropist's daughter, Barry succeeds in his task. Subsequently, promoted to a junior reporter, he stumbles upon the criminals' den. A colleague, in cahoots with the thieves, learns of the hideout's location from Barry and discreetly alerts the authorities. In a twist, Barry discovers that the philanthropist is the gang's ringleader. As law enforcement closes in, Barry intervenes, asserting the philanthropist's reformed character. Choosing discretion, Barry opts not to disclose the story, safeguarding the reputations of the father and daughter.

== Cast ==
- Wesley Barry as Thomas Patrick O'Toole
- Mildred Harris as Margie Toler
- Pat O'Malley as Jack Turner, City Editor
- Mary Carr as Tom's Mother
- George Fawcett as J. William Toler
- Stuart Holmes as Bull Connor
- Ann May (uncredited)

== Preservation ==
A partial print of The Fighting Cub with one reel missing is held by the UCLA Film & Television Archive.

== Bibliography ==
- Munden, Kenneth White. The American Film Institute Catalog of Motion Pictures Produced in the United States, Part 1. University of California Press, 1997.
