= James J. Cooke =

- Born: August 2, 1939; Baltimore, Maryland
- Died: March 28, 2016 (aged 76); Oxford, Mississippi
- Education: Mississippi College; University of Georgia
- Occupations: Soldier, historian, author, academic
- Spouse: Josephine Alexander (m. 1961)
- Children: 4

James J. Cooke (2 August 1939 – 28 March 2016) was an American historian, author, academic and soldier. He is known for his studies of the United States Armed Forces during World War I.

== Early life ==
Born at St. Mary's Hospital in Baltimore, Maryland on August 2, 1939, and baptized into the Christian Faith at Christ Lutheran Church in York, Pennsylvania, a month later. He resided in Baltimore until the family moved to Brooklyn Park. In 1956, his junior year of high school, he joined the US Army Reserves. He wrote in his high school year book in 1957 that he wanted to be a "college history teacher". His love of history began in the time he spent with his family in York. Charles Wise, a concert violinist, served in France in World War I as an infantry soldier. His great-grandmother Mina Belle Wise went West to Montana to do her Christian duty to teach for a year, and returned with stories of the "cowboys and the Indians". His great-aunt Mary Utz was a strong Christian, advocating Victorian virtues. Their impact was great and long-lasting. While in York he met one Union Civil War veteran, and also an old lady who saw Pickett's Charge at Gettysburg in 1863.

Upon graduation from Brooklyn Park High School in 1957, Cooke tried his hand at various jobs, since college funds were non-existent. He then joined the US Regular Army, and after training in the United States he was assigned to the US Army General Depot at Ingrandes-sur-Vienne, France. In September 1960, he met a Miss Josephine Alexander of Vicksburg, Mississippi, who had just arrived on post as a Department of the Army Civilian (DAC) Service Club Hostess. On October 6, 1961, they were married, first in the Office of the Mayor of Ingrandes (as required by French law), and then in a ceremony in the post chapel. In 1962, they returned to the United States.

Cooke entered Mississippi College, Clinton, Mississippi, in 1962, earning a BA in 1965 and MA in 1966. He was accepted in the PhD program at the University of Georgia, and graduated in the summer of 1969. While at Georgia he studied under Professor Alf Andrew Heggoy and developed a speciality in Arab, Islamic North Africa, which was coupled with a field in Modern European History. Cooke's dissertation Eugene Etienne and the New French Imperialism required study and research in Paris, France, made possible by a French study grant. During the last few months of his PhD studies he had several job offers and accepted the post of assistant professor of history at the University of Mississippi in Oxford, where his wife had received her BA 1959.

== Early writing career ==
Being a staunch advocate for the concept that a university professor had the obligation to research and publish as well as teach, he began by having articles accepted in the journals The Muslim World, African Studies Review, African Quarterly (New Delhi, India), The Indian Political Science Review, Military Affairs, and others. His first book, New French Imperialism: The Third Republic and Colonial Expansion (1973) and his second book, France, 1789 - 1962 (1975) were published in England by David and Charles Ltd. A third book was a collaborative effort, Through Foreign Eyes: Westerners View North Africa (1982). At that time Cooke, Alf Heggoy, Claude Sturgill (University of Florida) and others founded The French Colonial Historical Society.

== United States Army service ==
Still feeling a strong attachment to the military, Cooke sought a commission in the United States Army and was commissioned a second lieutenant in military intelligence as a strategic analyst. He began his officer's service, however, as an armored cavalry platoon leader in A Troop, 108th Armored Cavalry of the Mississippi Army National Guard. He commanded B Troop of the 108th for six years. In the 1980s he joined the Intelligence Section of the 155th Armored Brigade of the Mississippi Army National Guard, and commanded that section until he was promoted to major and became the executive officer of the 2nd Battalion, 198th Armor Regiment, an M1 tank battalion.

He returned to the headquarters of the 155th Brigade, took command of the Readiness Section and was promoted to the rank of lieutenant colonel. In August 1990, with Desert Shield in progress in Saudi Arabia, the Army called up every Arabic-speaking officer it could find. Cooke, a lieutenant colonel with intelligence experience, was near the head of the list. He left the National Guard for a return to the Regular Army and was assigned to the G2 (Intelligence), XVIII Airborne Corps. He was posted as the corps liaison officer for intelligence to The Saudi Eastern Province Area Command, with authority extending to the Saudi–Kuwaiti border.

In January the XVIII Airborne Corps shifted its area of operations west. Cooke, a fluent French speaker, was assigned as the corps liaison officer for intelligence with the French Division Daguet, as part of Operation Daguet. During Desert Storm Cooke and the division saw heavy combat, and at the end of the war they occupied the town of As Salman, Iraq. For his combat service Cooke was awarded the Bronze Star Medal.

== Post-service published works ==
After his service with the XVIIIth Airborne Corps and the Division Daguet, Cooke returned to Fort Bragg, North Carolina, to be demobilized. Returning to the University of Mississippi, he began to write his memoirs of the Persian Gulf War, which was published by Praeger Publishing under the title of 100 Hundred Miles From Baghdad: With the French in Desert Storm (1993) This book began a long association with Praeger Publishing.

Prior to the Gulf War, Cooke's scholarly work underwent a transition. While doing research in Paris on the French administration of Morocco, he worked with the papers of General Henri Gouraud, who served in Morocco and on the Western Front during World War I. The general continually referred to "his" Americans under his command during the war. This happened in spite of General John Pershing's resistance to the merging of American troops with French or British during the war. On his return, Cooke obtained the letters and papers of a soldier who served in the 168th Infantry Regiment of the famed 42nd Infantry Division, commonly known as the Rainbow Division. That division was under General Gouraud's command during the heavy fighting during the summer of 1918.

After research in Washington, numerous state archives, and at the Army War College at Carlisle, Pennsylvania, Cooke completed The Rainbow Division in the Great War, 1917 - 1919, released by Praeger in 1994. This book was followed by The U.S. Air Service in the Great War, 1917 - 1919 (1996), Pershing and His Generals: Command and Staff in the AEF (1997), and The All-Americans at War: The 82nd Division in the Great War (1999).

A year after his return from Desert Storm to the university, Cooke was invited to be a visiting professor of history at the U.S. Air Force’s Air War College at Maxwell Air Force Base in Alabama. While there he began research on the founding fathers of American air power during World War I. This research led to the publication in 2002 of a biography, Billy Mitchell (Lynne Rienner Press).

At the same time Cooke came in contact with British historians who had a major scholarly interest in the Great War. This association with the British scholars, Peter Liddle, Hugh Cecil, and Ian Whitehead, resulted in the publication of a number of co-authored books. Cooke contributed chapters to Facing Armageddon (Pen and Sword, 1996), and At the Eleventh Hour (Penn and Sword, 1998). In 2000 Cooke contributed two chapters to the two-volume The Great World War, 1914 - 1945 (HarperCollins). While working with British historians, Cooke continued a relation with the military historian David Zabecki. Cooke wrote eleven entries for Zabecki’s World War II in Europe: An Encyclopedia (Garland, 1999) and contributed a chapter entitled “James Guthrie Harbord: Pershing's Chief of Staff” in Zabecki's two-volume Chief of Staff (Naval Institute Press, 2008).

Continuing this growing interest in World War II, Cooke became associated with The Second World War Experience Centre in Horsforth, Leeds, West Yorkshire, and published five articles in the journal Everyone’s War. He maintains a close working relationship with the centre, focusing on the building of the American archival portion.

Cooke edited a reprinting of the classic World War I memoir by Martin Hogan, The Shamrock Battalion in the Great War (1919) (University of Missouri Press, 2007). In 2009, his book, Chewing Gum, Candy Bars, and Beer: The Army PX in World War II (University of Missouri Press) was published.

In 1995, Cooke retired from the Mississippi Army National Guard and was placed on the retired list with the rank of brigadier general. In 1999 he retired from the University of Mississippi. Over the years he received honors: Fellow, The Royal Historical Society; Chevalier, Ordre des Palmes Académiques (France); and Fellow, The Second World War Experience Centre. He remains a member of the Division Daguet veterans association in France and a member of the Oxford post of the Veterans of Foreign Wars. Upon retiring from the National Guard with 34 years of service he was decorated with the Meritorious Service Medal and the Magnolia Cross of the state of Mississippi.

In retirement, gardening, scholarly research, and veterans’ affairs occupied his time. The Cookes have four grown children: Victoria Ellen Cooke, James Alexander Cooke, Josephine Estelle (Josie) Cooke, and John Harrell Cooke. He died on 6 March 2016 at Baptist Memorial Hospital in Oxford, Mississippi.

== Bibliography ==
- Cooke, James J, New French Imperialism, 1880-1910: The Third Republic and Colonial Expansion , David & Charles 1973 ISBN 0-208-01320-2
- Cooke, James J, France: 1789-1962, David & Charles Publishers 1975 ISBN 0-208-01510-8
- Cooke, James J, 100 Miles from Baghdad: With the French in Desert Storm, Greenwood Publishing Group, Incorporated 1993 ISBN 0-275-94528-6
- Cooke, James J, The Rainbow Division in the Great War, 1917-1919, Greenwood Publishing Group, Incorporated 1994 ISBN 0-275-94768-8
- Cooke, James J, The U.S. Air Service in the Great War, 1917-1919, Praeger Pub Text 1996 ISBN 0-275-94862-5
- Cooke, James J, Pershing and His Generals :Command and Staff in the AEF, Harcourt Education 1997 ISBN 0-275-95363-7
- Cooke, James J, All-Americans at War : The 82nd Division in the Great War, 1917-1918, Pub. Praeger Pub Text 1999 ISBN 0-275-95740-3
- Cooke, James J, Billy Mitchell, Pub Lynne Rienner 2002 ISBN 1-58826-082-8
- Cooke, James J, Chewing Gum, Candy Bars, and Beer The Army PX in World War II, University of Missouri Press 2009 ISBN 978-0-8262-1867-4
- Cooke, James J. American Girls, Beer and Glenn Miller, University of Missouri Press, 2012 ISBN 978-0-8262-1984-8
