= 1st Infantry Division Museum =

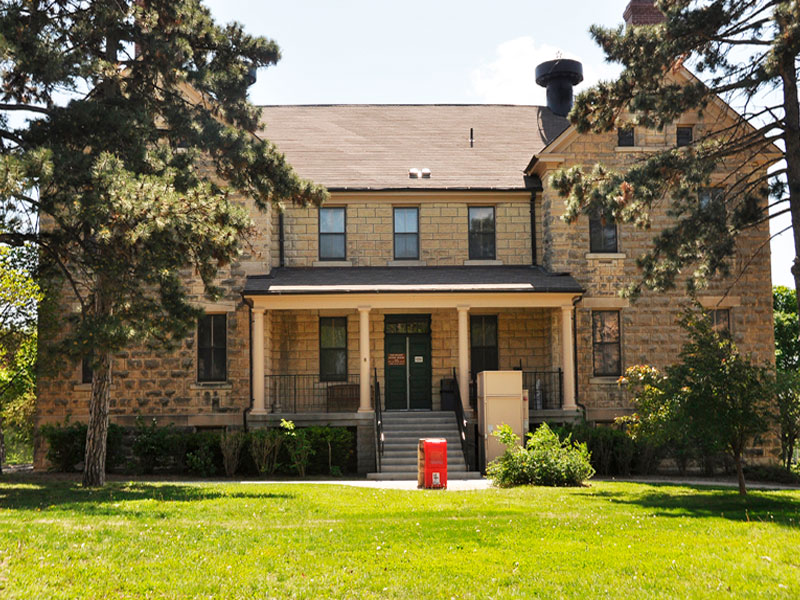

- Location within Kansas
- Location: Fort Riley, Kansas, United States
- Coordinates: 39.062691°N 96.781955°W
- Type: Military museum
- Curator: Robert J. Smith
- Website: history.army.mil/Army-Museum-Enterprise/Find-an-Army-Museum/1st-Infantry-Division-Museum/

The 1st Infantry Division Museum is a military museum located on Fort Riley in Kansas, United States.

== Exhibits ==
The museum covers the history of the 1st Infantry Division (United States) from World War I to present day.

== Visitor restrictions ==
Since the museum is on an active U.S. Army base, there are restrictions on visitors, including requirements for photo identification.
