= National Museum of Military History =

National Museum of Military History may refer to:

- National Museum of Military History (Bulgaria), a museum in Sofia, Bulgaria
- National Museum of Military History (Luxembourg), a museum in Diekirch, Luxembourg
- South African National Museum of Military History, a museum in Johannesburg, South Africa

== See also ==
- List of military museums
- Museum of Military History
