= Museum of the Armed Act =

Coordinates: 50°04′53″N 20°02′11″E

- Muzeum Czynu Zbrojnego
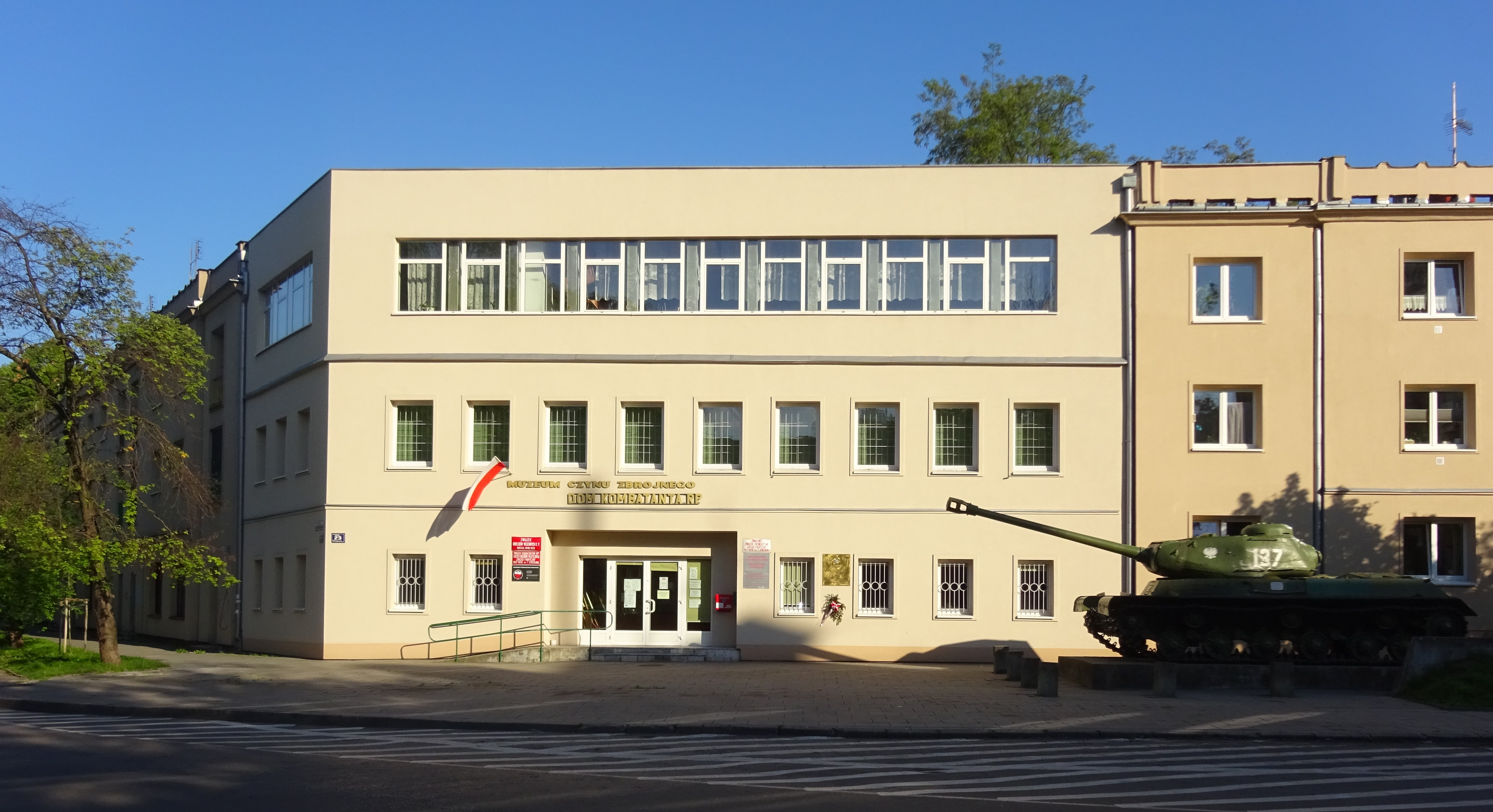
- The Museum in 2018
- Dissolved: 2022; 4 years ago
- Location: os. Górali 23, 31-961 Kraków, Poland
- Type: Military museum

Museum of the Armed Act (Polish: Muzeum Czynu Zbrojnego) is a museum in Kraków, Poland. It was established in 1963 and by 1970 had 3000 artifacts.
