= Jaisalmer War Museum =

Coordinates: 26.9414306°N 71.0247137°E

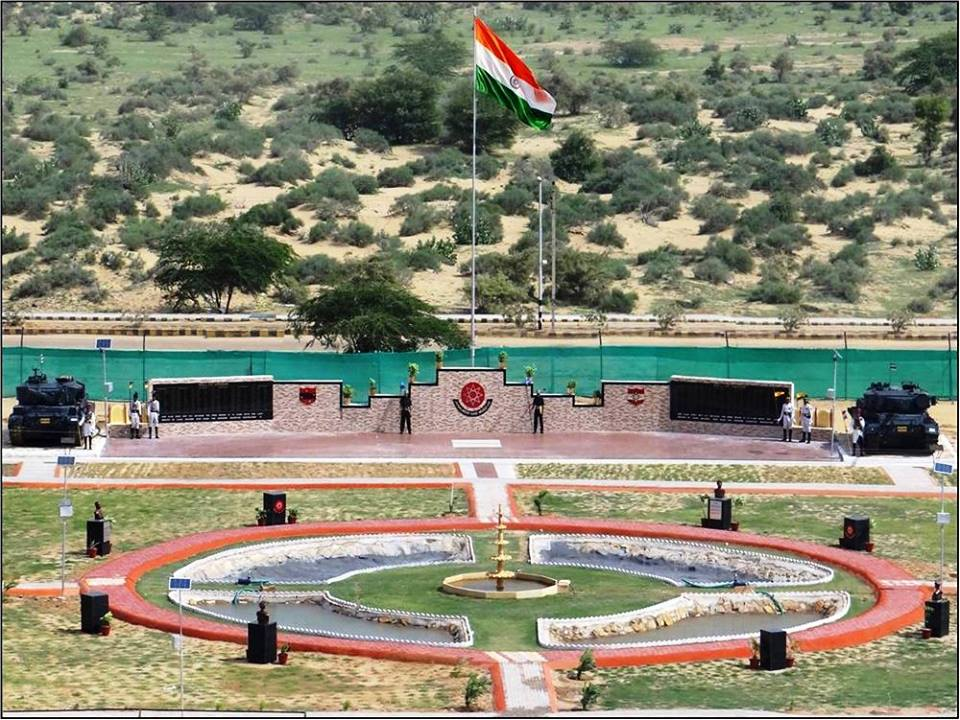
- Location: Jaisalmer - Jodhpur Highway, 10 km short of Jaisalmer, Rajasthan, India
- Type: War museum
- Collection size: War exhibits, vehicles, equipment captured during operations in 1965 and 1971
- Founder: Lieutenant General Bobby Mathews
- Owner: Indian Army

The Jaisalmer War Museum was conceived by Lieutenant General Bobby Mathews, AVSM, VSM, General Officer Commanding, Desert Corps and constructed by the Desert Corps of the Indian Army.

It was dedicated to the Nation by Lieutenant General Ashok Singh, PVSM, AVSM, SM, VSM, ADC, General Officer Commanding-in-Chief, Southern Command, Indian Army, on 24 August 2015. The Museum displays war exhibits which include vehicles and equipment captured during the course of operations in 1965 and 1971. The Jaisalmer War Museum, popularly known as JWM, has an Honour Wall engraved with the names of the Param Vir Chakra and Maha Vir Chakra gallantry award winners, two large Information Display Halls - Indian Army Hall and Laungewala Hall, an Audio Visual Room, a souvenir shop and a cafeteria. A Hunter Aircraft of the Indian Air Force, which destroyed enemy tank columns during the Battle of Laungewala is also displayed.

The Jaisalmer War Museum is located 10 km short of Jaisalmer on the Jaisalmer - Jodhpur Highway. The inauguration of the Museum took place in the Golden Jubilee Commemoration Year of the 1965 India Pakistan War.

== Concept ==
The Jaisalmer War Museum was conceptualised to display India's rich military history and showcase real war efforts as they happened in the past. The Jaisalmer War Museum aims to promote greater awareness of the sacrifice made by heroes of the Indian Army, in particular, and Indian Armed Forces in general.

== Chronology ==
The idea of establishing a War Museum at Jaisalmer in the state of Rajasthan was mooted by Lieutenant General Bobby Mathews, AVSM, VSM, General Officer Commanding, Konark Corps, with a view to showcase India's military history and war time experiences. Jaisalmer district was chosen for its rich martial traditions and for being witness to numerous battles including the famous Battle of Laungewala in 1971. The task of constructing and setting up the Jaisalmer War Museum on an area of flat, barren ground, within the Jaisalmer Military Station, was subsequently undertaken by the Desert Corps of the Indian Army, under the guidance of Lieutenant General Mathews.

== Laungewala Hall ==
The Hall showcases the progression of the Battle of Laungewala as it took place on the night of 4 December 1971. The Hall also displays Indian Army operations on Eastern and Western Sectors during Indo-Pak War 1971. The 106mm RCL Gun displayed in the Central Foyer had a vital role in stopping the initial armour assault during the Battle of Laungewala.

== Indian Army Hall ==
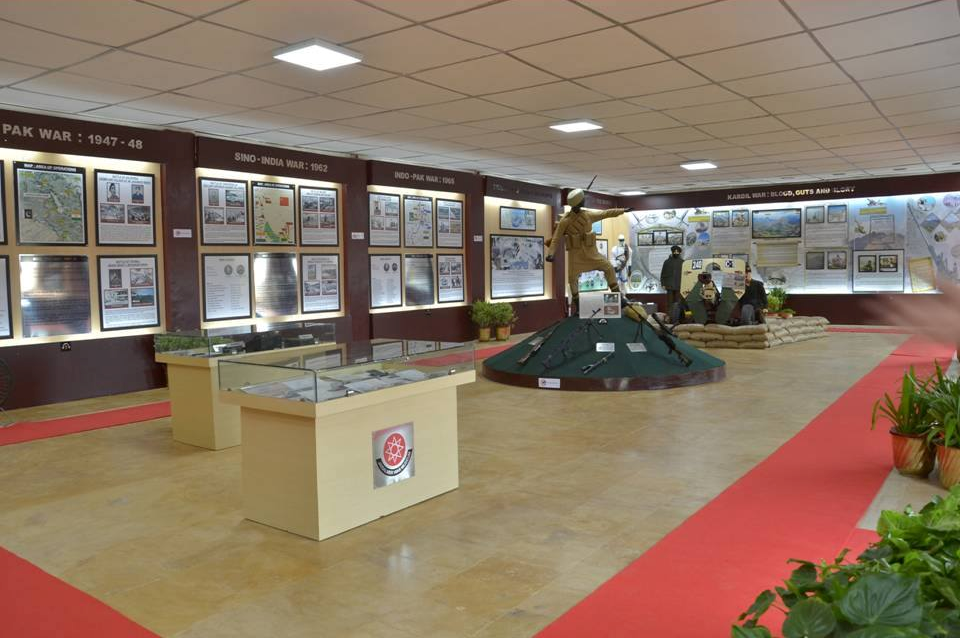
Indian Army Hall

The Indian Army hall showcases the wars fought in 1947-48, 1965 and 1999 (Kargil). The Hall also displays arms and ammunition captured and equipment used during various wars by the Indian Army. Various facets of the role of Indian Army in national development, disaster relief and aid to civil authorities are well documented in the Indian Army Hall.

== Gallery ==
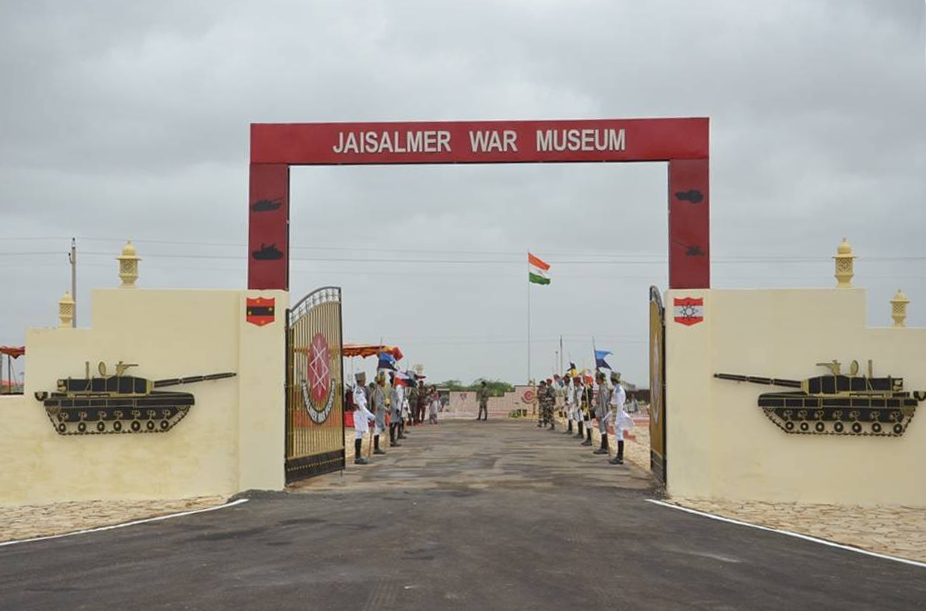
Entrance Gate from NH-15

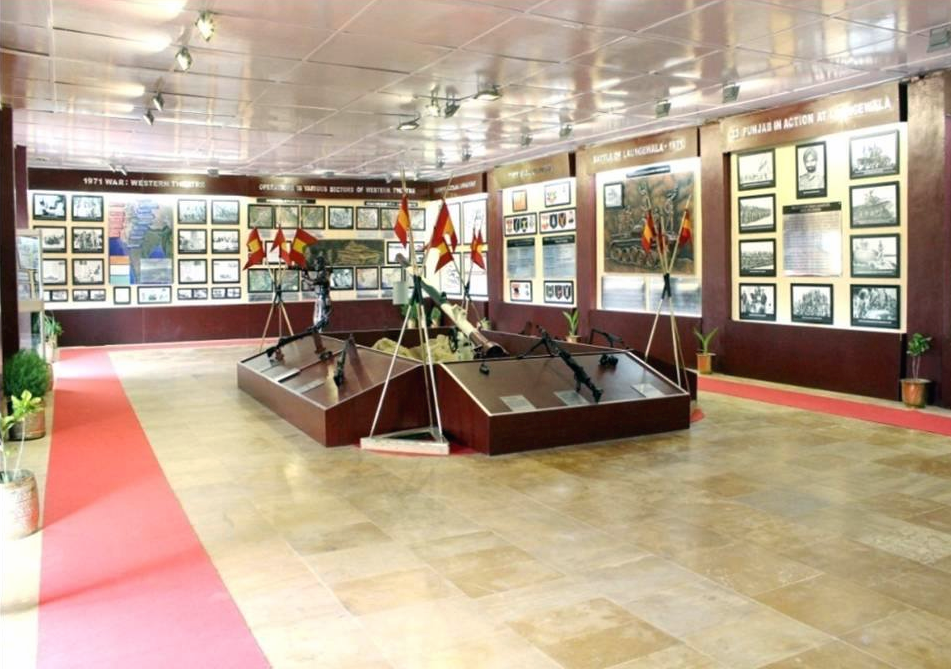
Laungewala Hall

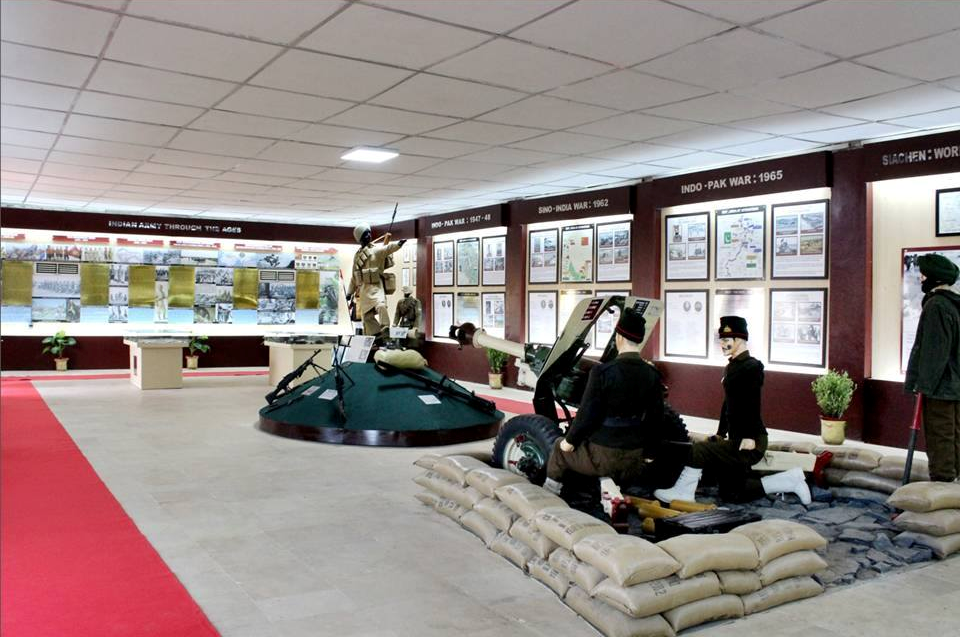
Indian Army Hall

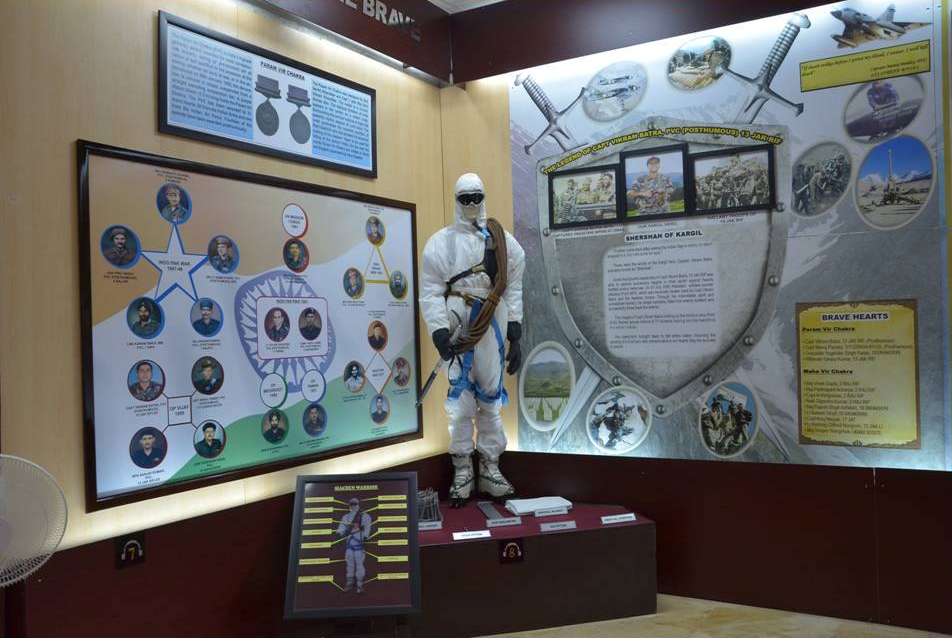
Siachen Warrior

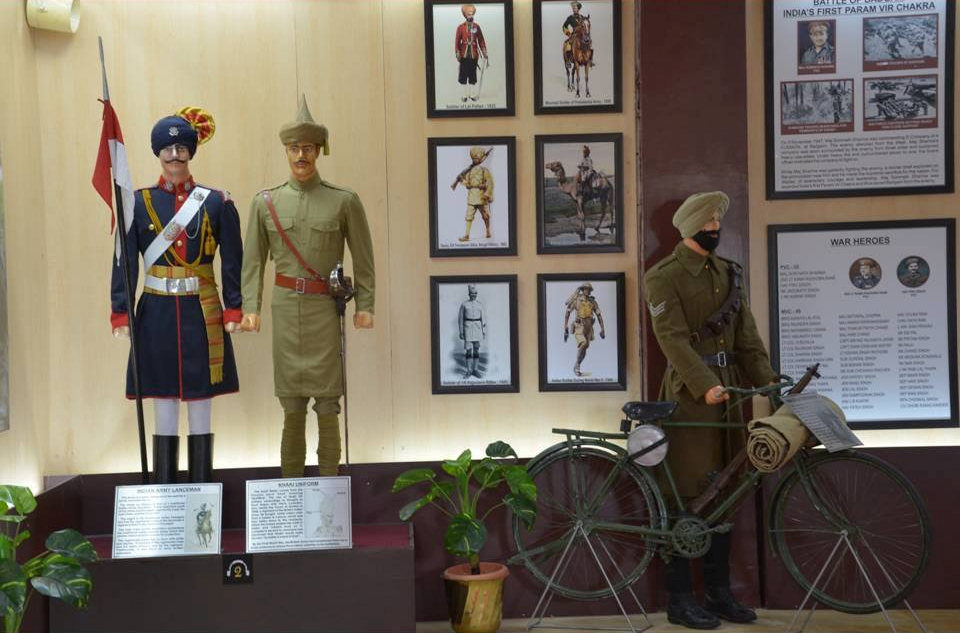
WWI Indian Army Cycle Warriors

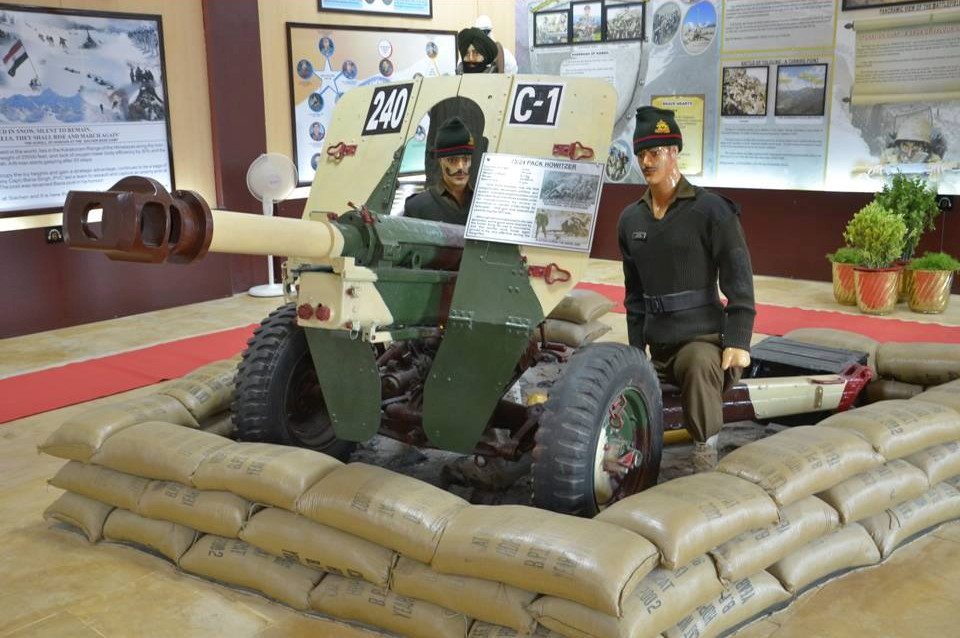
Artillery Gun team during Operation Vijay, 1999

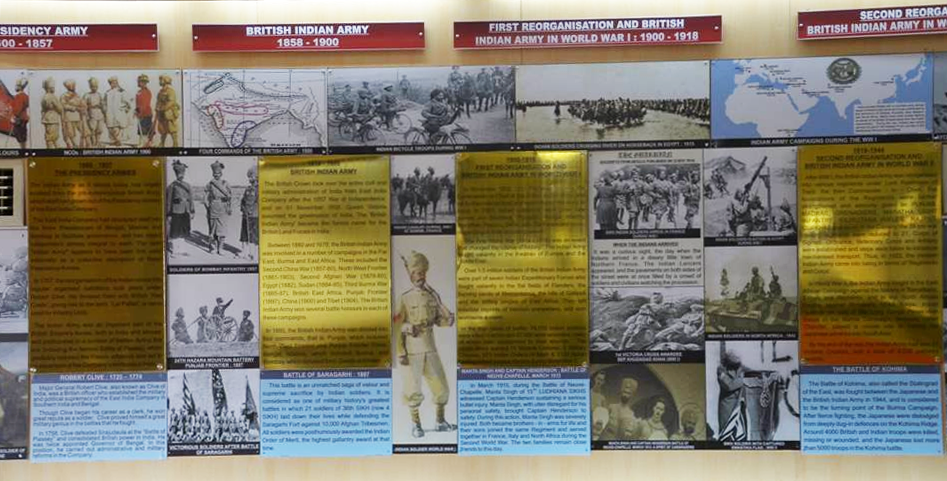
Genesis of the Indian Army

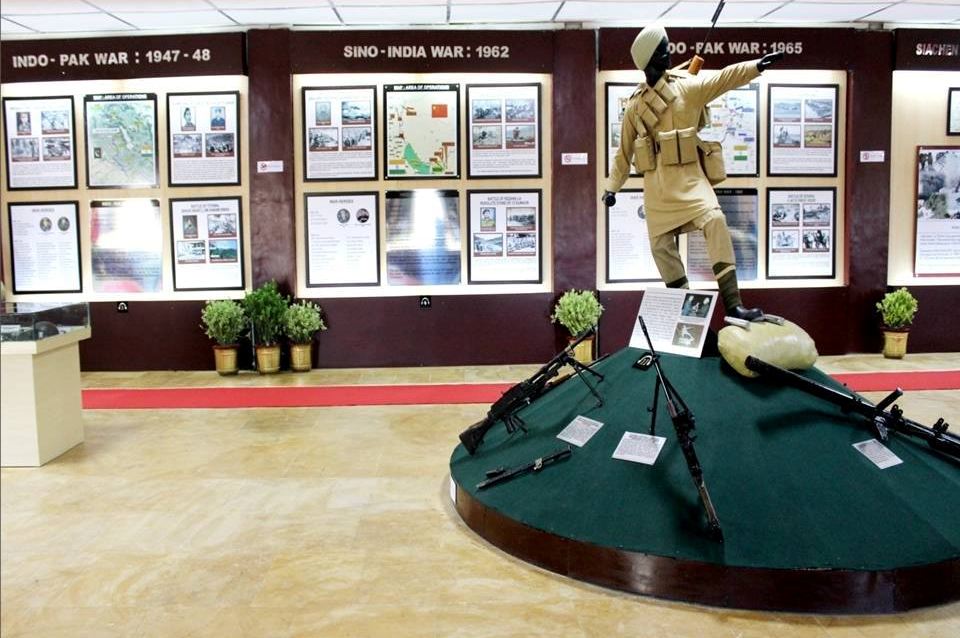
Weapons in the Indian Army Hall

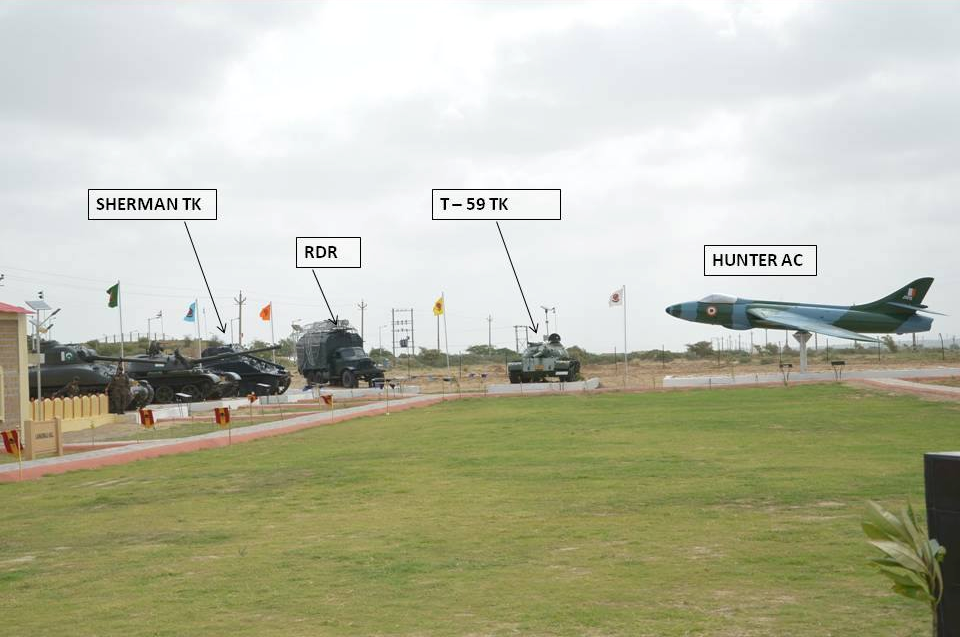
War equipment

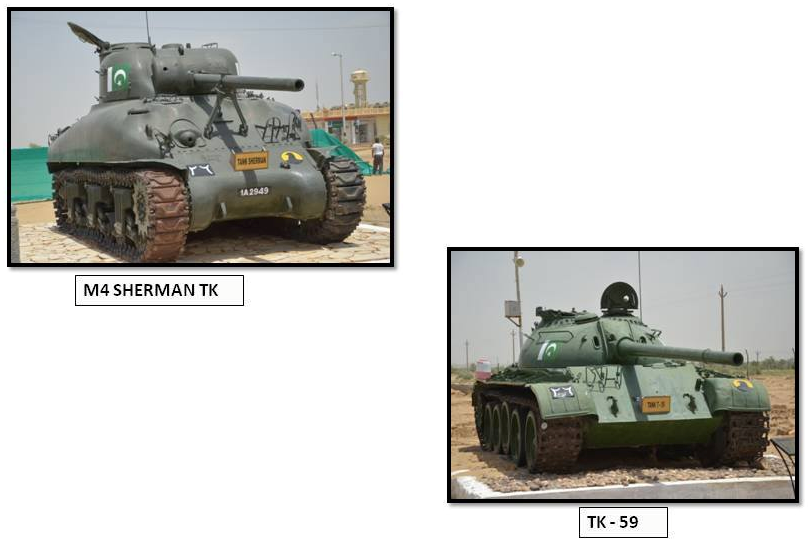
Captured enemy tanks

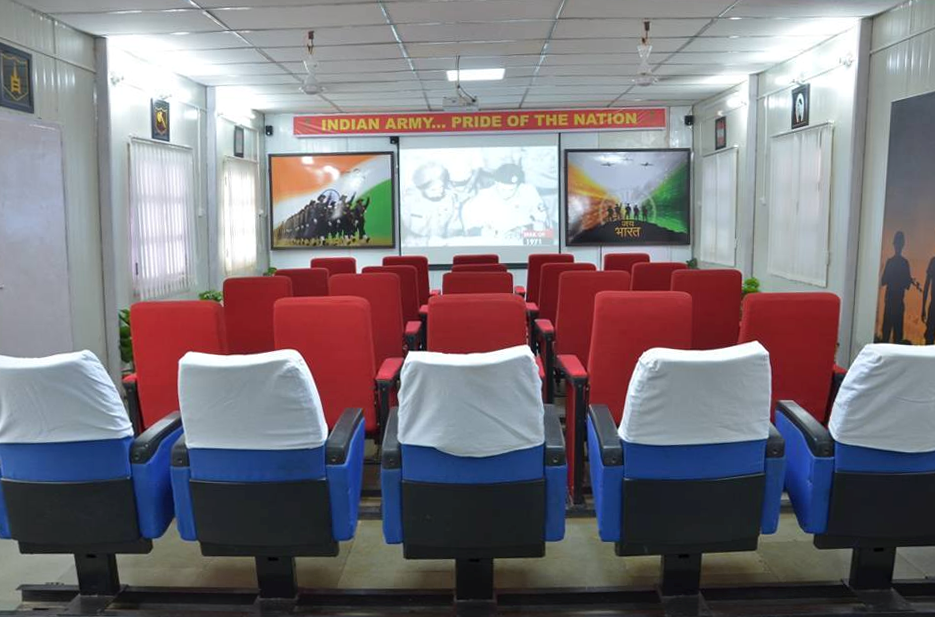
Audio Visual Hall

== Reception ==
The Museum has been well received by the local population and the media.

The museum is open all year round. The entry for the museum is free. They screen a short documentary for which there is an entry fee. There is a cafeteria on the premises. A large free parking area is also available.
