= Museum of Weapons and Early American History =

Museum in St. Augustine, Florida, U.S.

- Location within Florida
- Established: 1986
- Location: 81-C King Street; St. Augustine, Florida
- Coordinates: 29.891848°N 81.314709°W
- Type: Military History

The Museum of Weapons & Early American History was located in St. Augustine, Florida in the United States. The museum, located at the intersection of King and Granada streets, was home to a collection of guns, swords, pictures and lithographs dating from 1500 to 1900. The museum also included collections of muskets, shipwreck artifacts, period documents, Native American artifacts, and a Civil War display.
