= Museum of Russian Submarine Forces =

Museum in Saint Petersburg, Russia

Alexander Marinesko Museum of the Russian Submarine Forces
- Музей подводных сил России им. А. И. Маринеско
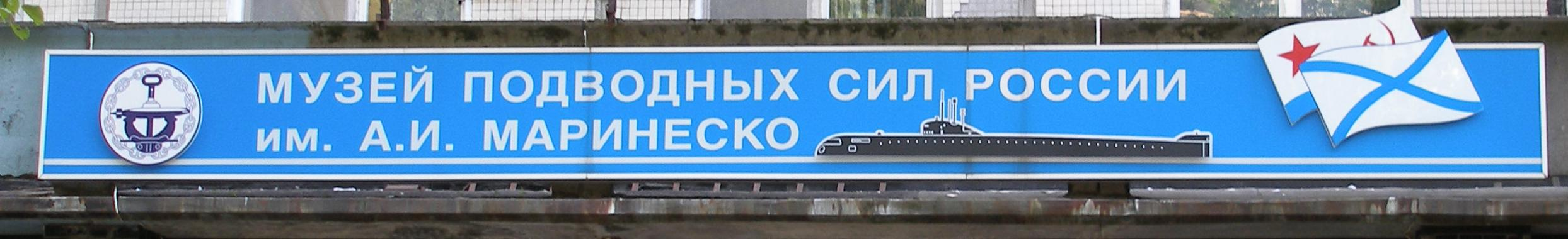
- Established: 1997
- Location: Saint-Petersburg, Russia, Kondratyevsky prospekt, 83, building 1.
- Coordinates: 59.9829°N 30.3988°E
- Type: History museum

The A.I. Marinesko Museum of the History of Russian Submarine Forces is a state museum located in Saint-Petersburg, Russia. The museum was named in honor of the Soviet submarine commander Alexander Marinesko. The museum was established in 1997.

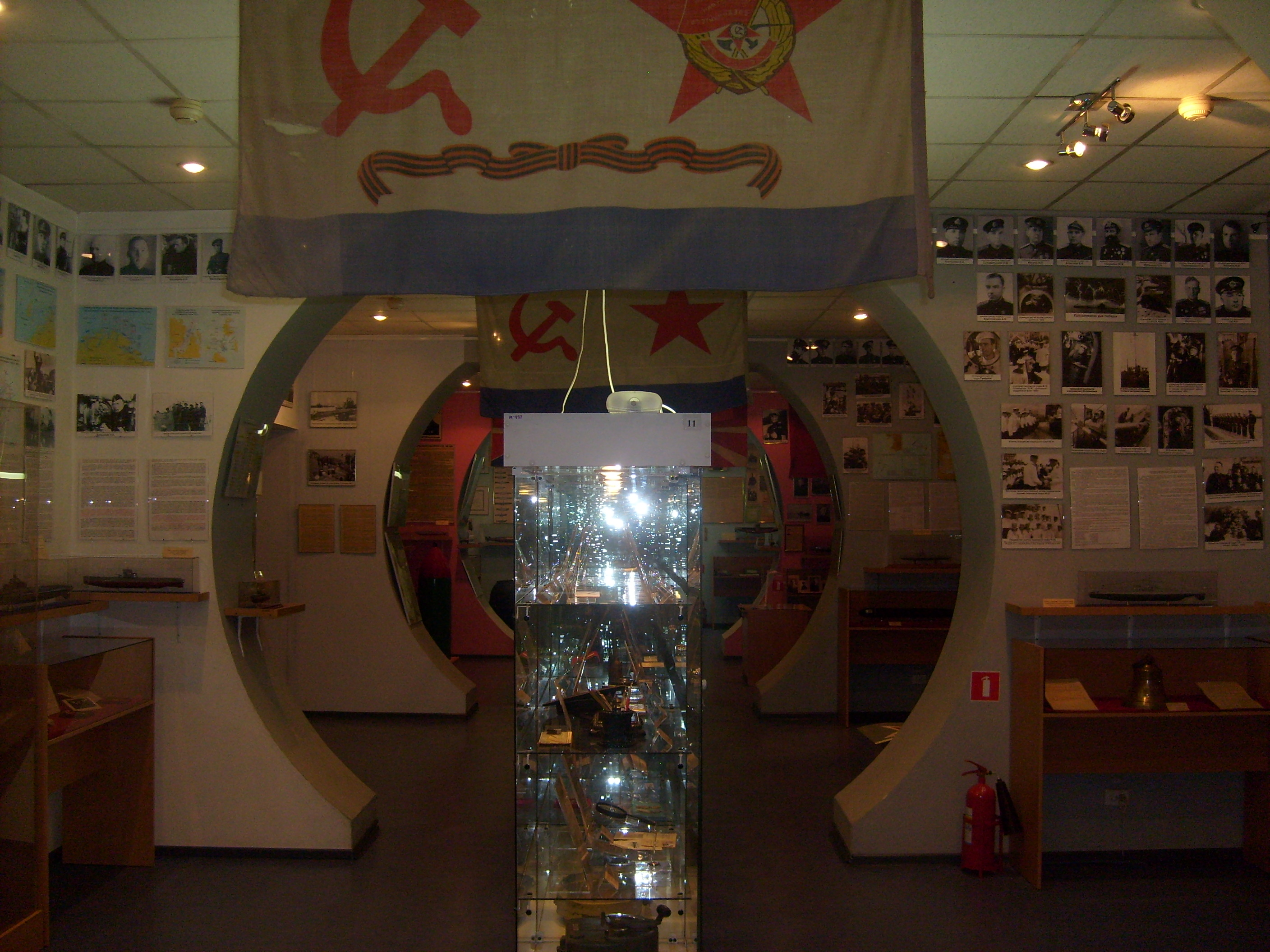
Museum hall

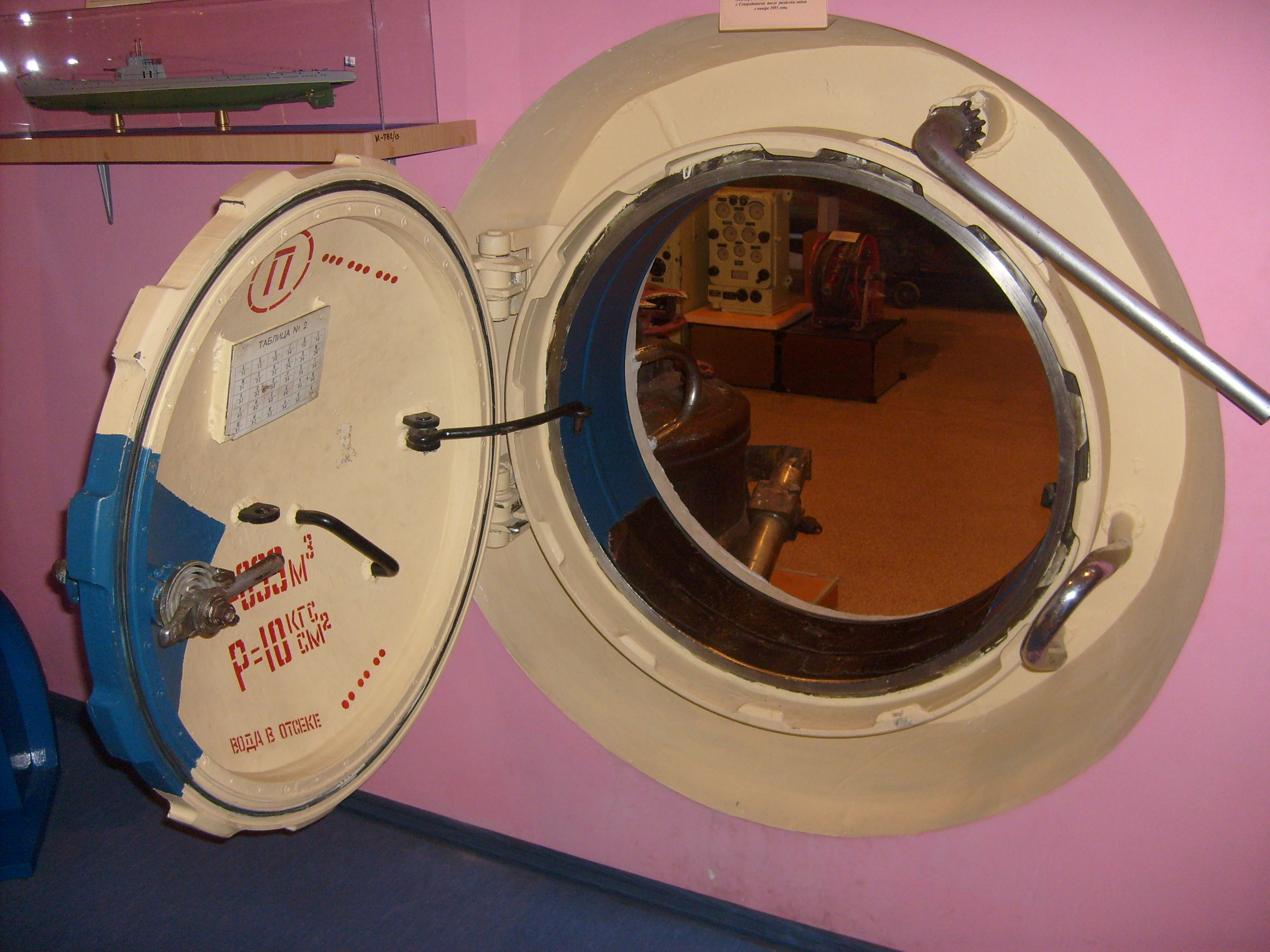
K-385 hatch
