= Yokaren Peace Memorial Museum =

Museum in Ibaraki Prefecture, Japan

- 予科練平和記念館
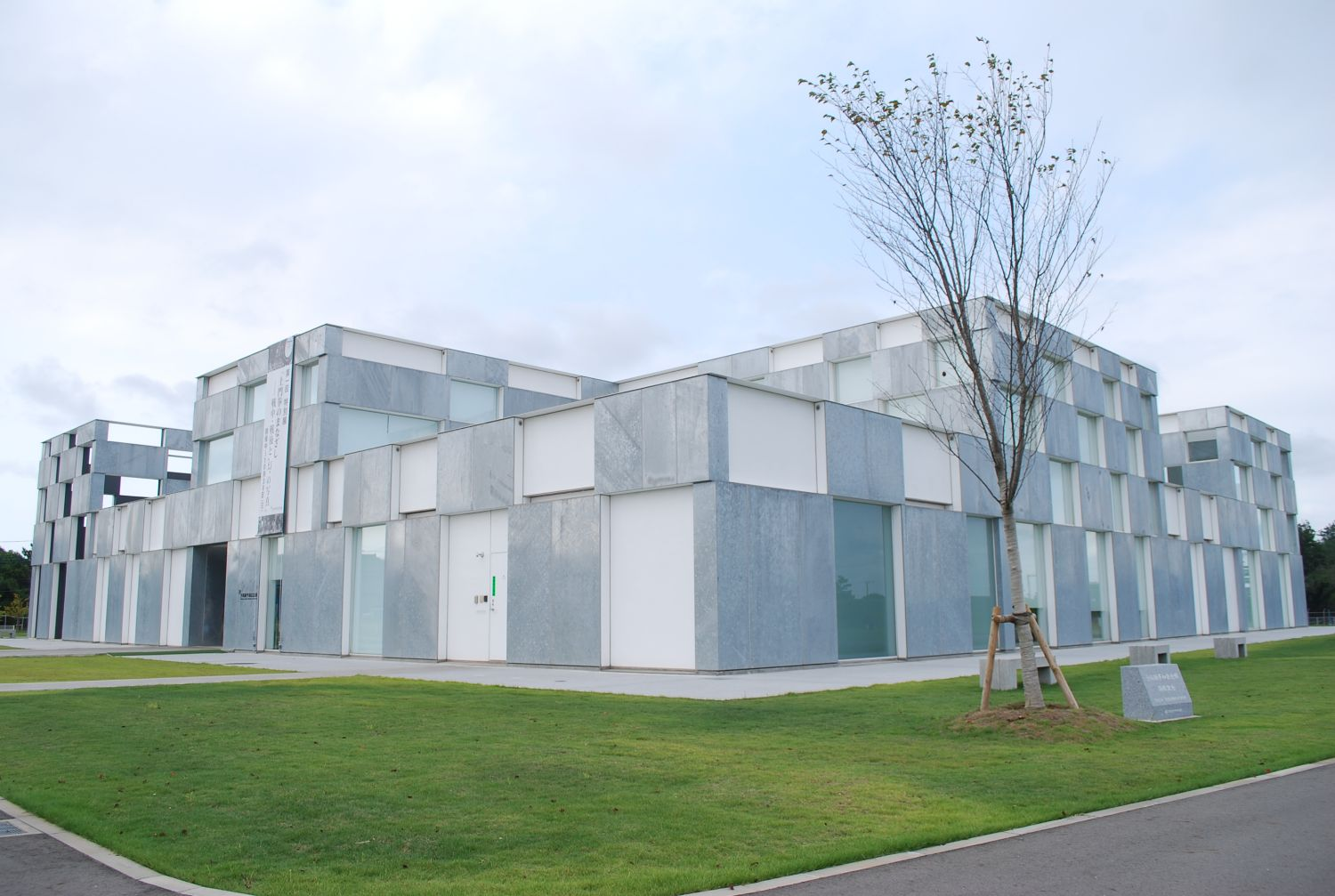
- Interactive map of the Yokaren Peace Memorial Museum area

General information
- Location: 5-1 Hasamado, Ami, Ibaraki Prefecture, Japan
- Coordinates: 36°02′44″N 140°13′24″E
- Opened: 2 February 2010

Website
- Official website

The Yokaren Peace Memorial Museum (予科練平和記念館, Yokaren Heiwa Kinenkan) opened in Ami, Ibaraki Prefecture, Japan, in 2010. The museum preserves and displays materials relating to the young Naval Aviator Preparatory Course trainees, Yokaren (予科練) for short, including photographs by Ken Domon. In the adjacent garden, the Yūshō-en (雄翔園), there is a monument to the approximately nineteen thousand Yokaren who died in the war, while the Yūshō-kan (雄翔館) stores and displays their last testaments and other personal effects.

== See also ==
- Pilot training in the Imperial Japanese Navy
- Chiran Peace Museum for Kamikaze Pilots
- Ken Domon Museum of Photography
- Kasumigaura Air Field
