= Maine Military Museum =

Military museum in Portland, Maine

- Location within Maine
- Location: South Portland, Maine, United States
- Coordinates: 43.62853704905771°N 70.28727289013094°W
- Type: Military museum
- Curator: Lee Humiston (2009–2026)
- Website: mainemilitarymuseum.org

The Maine Military Museum is a military museum located in South Portland, Maine, United States. The museum includes collections of uniforms, weapons, models, photos, and memorabilia. It has been noted as a museum of special interest by Visit Maine and has been called "one of Maine's hidden treasures" by Maine Public.

== History and artifacts ==
The Maine Military Museum was founded in 2009. It began as curator Lee Humiston's personal collection. The museum seeks to teach the motto "service above self" and pay tribute to Veterans. It features a special commemoration for prisoners of war and Maine's military history. It is also dedicated to police officers, firefighters and emergency medical technicians in South Portland. The museum actively seeks souvenirs from any war and routinely changes displays.

According to Troy R. Bennett of Bangor Daily News, the museum features "medals, model battleships and overseas souvenirs from countless American deployments", and added that "Dozens of life-sized mannequins with authentic military helmets and uniforms populate every exhibit. Vintage framed newspapers scream wartime headlines of victory and defeat. The walls bristle with swords and firearms".

Much of the museum's collection is fully authentic, including firearms dating back to the Revolutionary War. All of the artifacts and uniforms in the museum were donated by veterans and their families.

On April 15, 2026, the museum's curator, Lee Humiston, died of throat cancer at the age of 86.

== See also ==
- List of military museums
- List of museums in Maine
