= Opium War Museum =

Museum in Humen Town, China

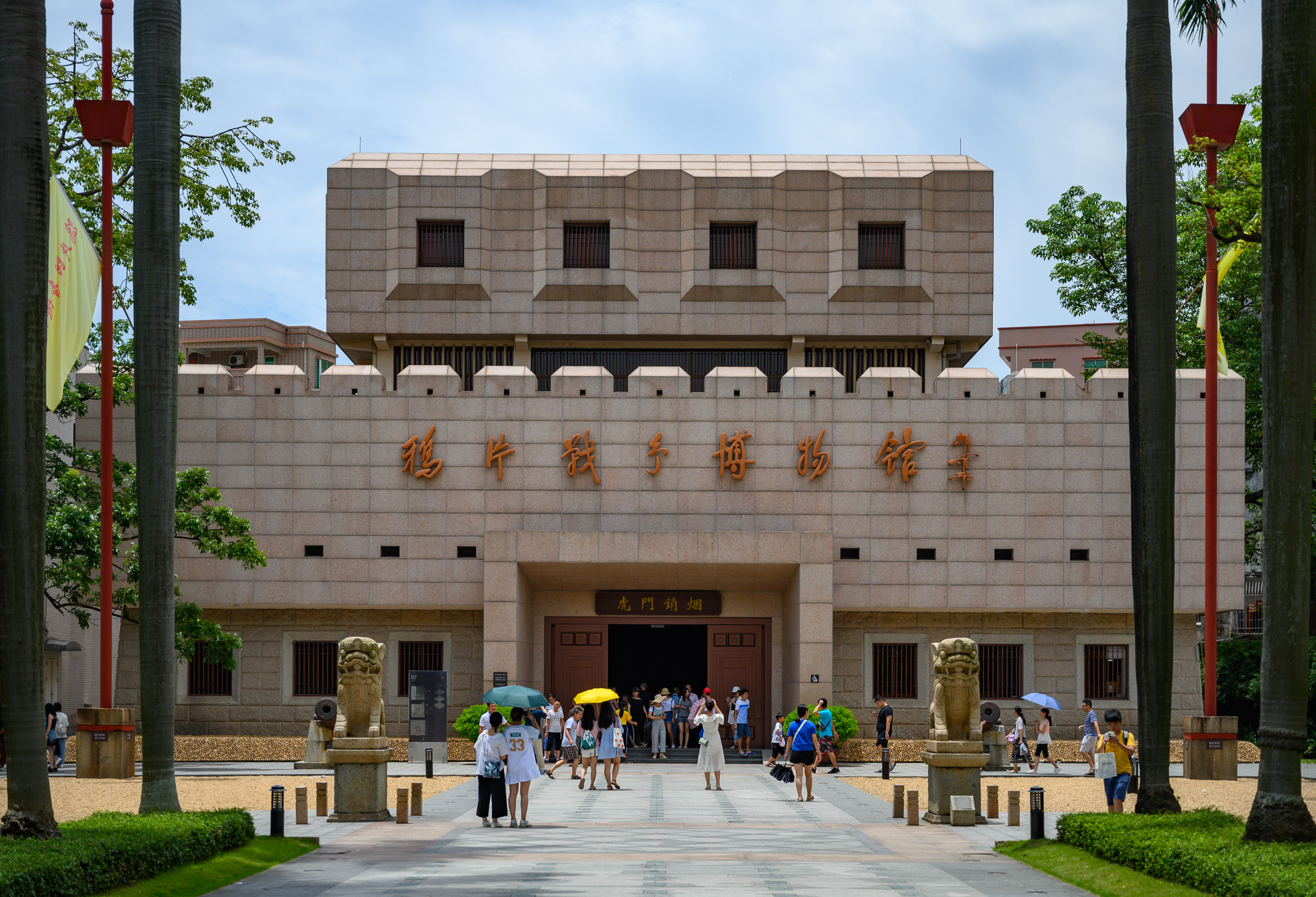
Opium War Museum

The Opium War Museum (simplified Chinese: 鸦片战争博物馆; traditional Chinese: 鴉片戰爭博物館)（Alternative name：Humen Lin Zexu Memorial Hall; simplified Chinese: 虎门林则徐纪念馆; traditional Chinese: 虎門林則徐紀念館）is a Chinese museum dedicated to the Lin Zexu and the Opium Wars. The museum is located in Humen Town, Guangdong Province.

== History ==
Built in 1957, with a floor area of about 2,400 square meters, the museum collects historical materials related to Lin Zexu's anti-narcotics policies and the Opium War. It was then renamed to the Opium War Humen People's Anti-British Memorial Hall (simplified Chinese: 鸦片战争虎门人民抗英纪念馆; traditional Chinese: 鴉片戰爭虎門人民抗英紀念館) in 1972, and then re-designated Humen Lin Zexu Memorial Hall in 1985. The museum manages the old sites of Lin Zexu's Smoke Pond and Humen Fortress, which are considered national relics (along with the museum itself).
