= Puget Sound Coast Artillery Museum =

Coordinates: 48.1344°N 122.7660°W

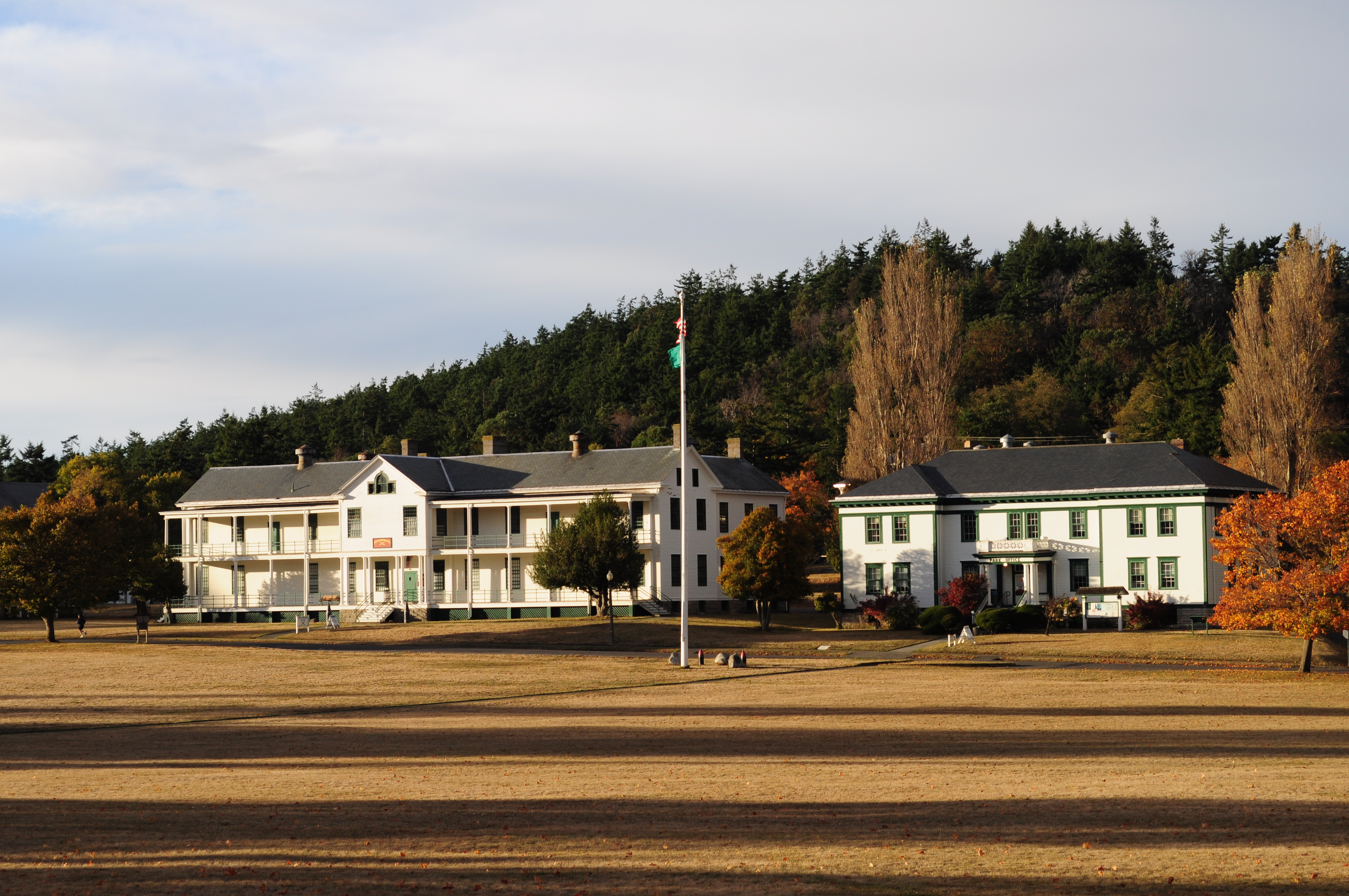
Puget Sound Coast Artillery Museum (left)

Puget Sound Coast Artillery Museum is a military museum located at Fort Worden State Park on Puget Sound, in the State of Washington. The museum occupies part of Building 201, a former barracks at Fort Worden.
