= İnönü Military Quarter and War Museum =

- İnönü Karargah Binası ve Savaş Müzesi
- İnönü Military Quarter and War Museum
- Established: 2001; 25 years ago
- Location: İnönü, Eskişehir Province, Turkey
- Coordinates: 39°48′53″N 30°08′38″E
- Type: Museum#Military and war
- Owner: Ministry of Culture and Tourism

İnönü Military Quarter and War Museum (Turkish: İnönü Karargah Binası ve Savaş Müzesi) is a military and war museum in Turkey.

It is situated in İnönü ilçe (district) of Eskişehir Province at 39°48′53″N 30°08′38″E. İnönü ilçe is 31 kilometres (19 mi) west of Eskişehir.

== Background ==
During the Turkish War of Independence, the commander of Western Front was İsmet Pasha. He fought in the First Battle of İnönü (9-11 January 1921) and in the Second Battle of İnönü (26–31 March 1921) against the invading Greek Army around the town of İnönü. In both engagements, he was successful. Thus, after the enactment of the Surname Law in 1934, İsmet Pasha chose the surname İnönü.

== The building ==
The museum building served as the military headquarters of İsmet Pasha during the battles. In 1987, the Ministry of Culture bought the building and converted it into a war museum. It was opened in 2001, on the 80th anniversary of the victories.

== The exhibits ==
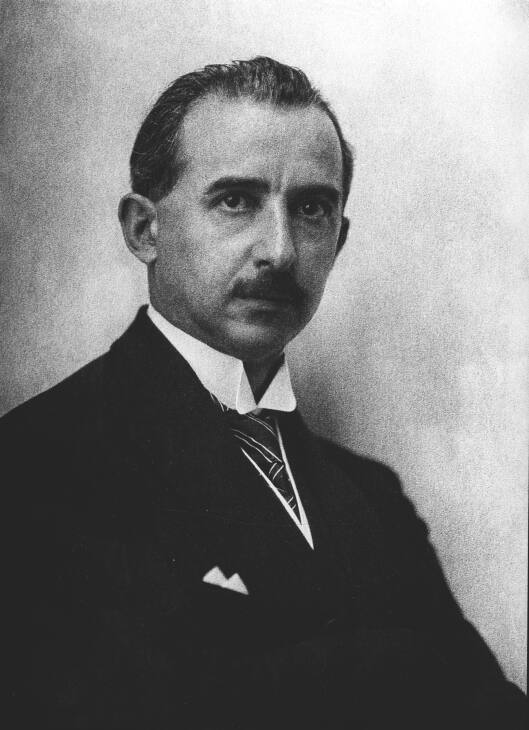
İsmet İnönü

In the museum, there are photographs of the battles, the copies of the correspondence between the commanders, the weapons and other military tools, the uniforms and some ethnographic items. The most important piece of correspondence is the telegram of Mustafa Kemal Pasha (later Atatürk) after the Second Battle of İnönü . The first paragraph of the telegram is "It is not so often the world history sees a commander as you, who have taken a huge responsibility in the İnönü battlefields. The independence and existence of our nation depended on the courageousness and patriotism of your commanders and fellow soldiers, who have been doing their honorable duties under your genius conduct. You did not only beat the ill fortune of the enemy but also that of the nation".
