= Museum of the Kalavryta Holocaust =

Museum in Kalavryta, Greece

Coordinates: 38.0329°N 22.1105°E

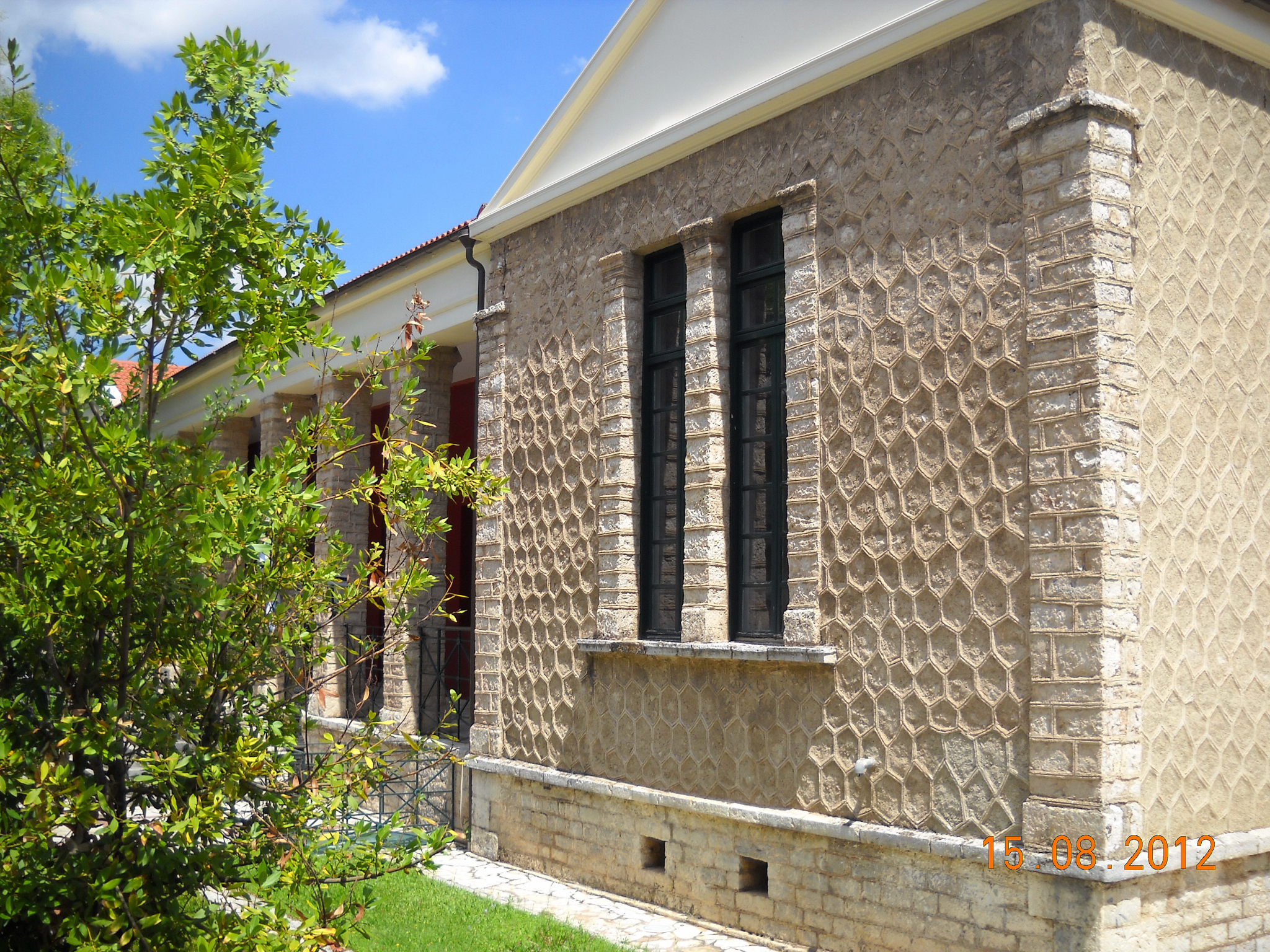
Image of Museum of the Kalavryta Holocaust

The Museum of the Kalavryta Holocaust is a museum in Kalavryta, Greece dedicated to the history of the Massacre of Kalavryta in 1943. The museum contains artifacts of the German occupation of the town and documents the massacre.
