= Kronstadt Naval Museum =

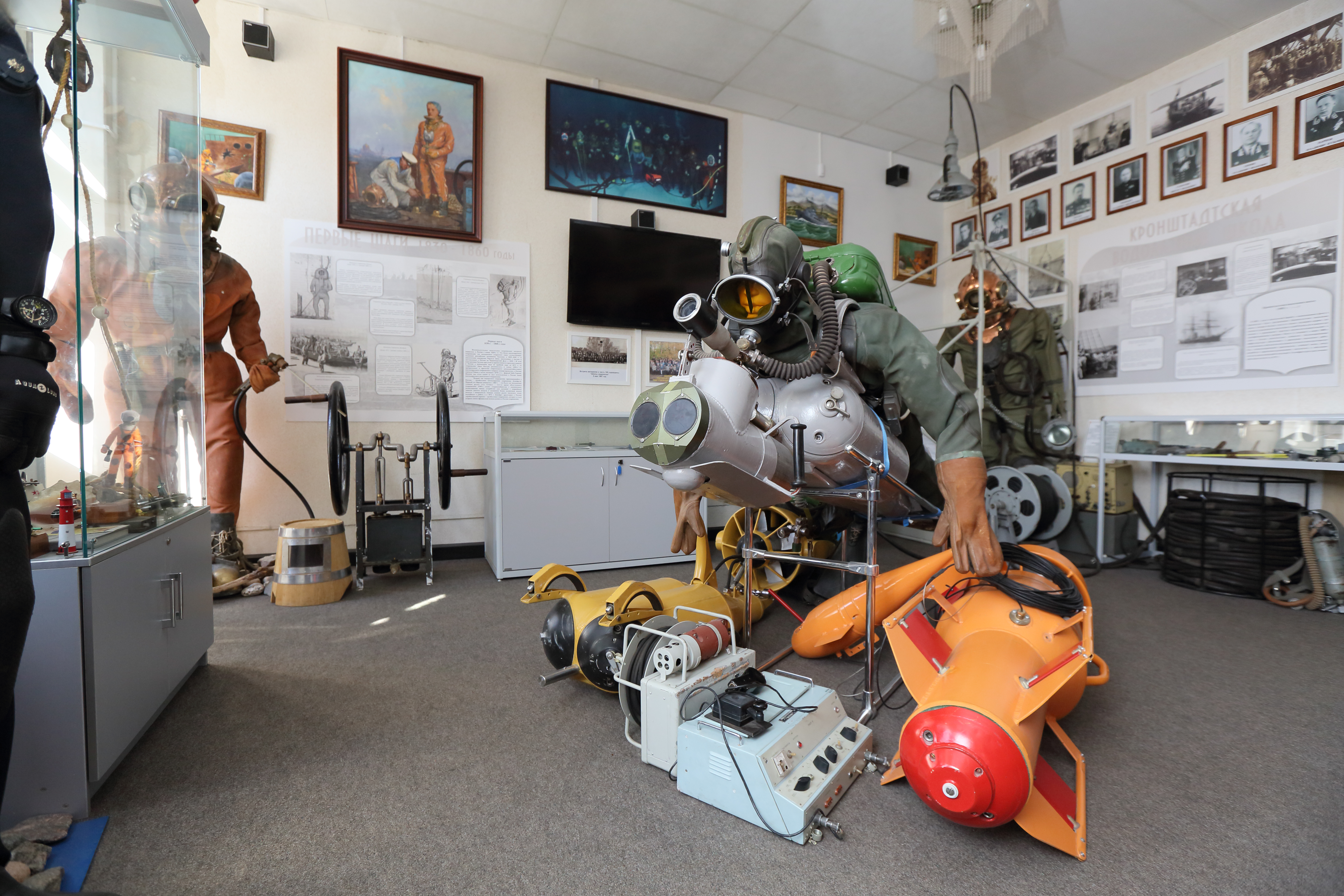
- Museum exposition
- Established: May 4, 2012
- Location: Russia, Kronstadt, Андреевская улица, 5
- Coordinates: 59°59′46″N 29°45′48″E
- Type: Maritime museum
- Visitors: 10,000 (2014)
- Founder: Fertoing Ltd.
- Curator: Vladimir Magilanich

The Kronstadt Naval Museum is a museum devoted to the history of underwater diving in Russia and the military history of Kronstadt in the 20th century. The museum is located on Kotlin Island in the central part of Kronstadt.

== History ==
The museum was opened on May 4, 2012, by enthusiasts and financial support of engineering company Fertoing, ahead of the 130th anniversary of the establishment of the first military diving school in Kronstadt on May 5, 1882.

== Collection ==
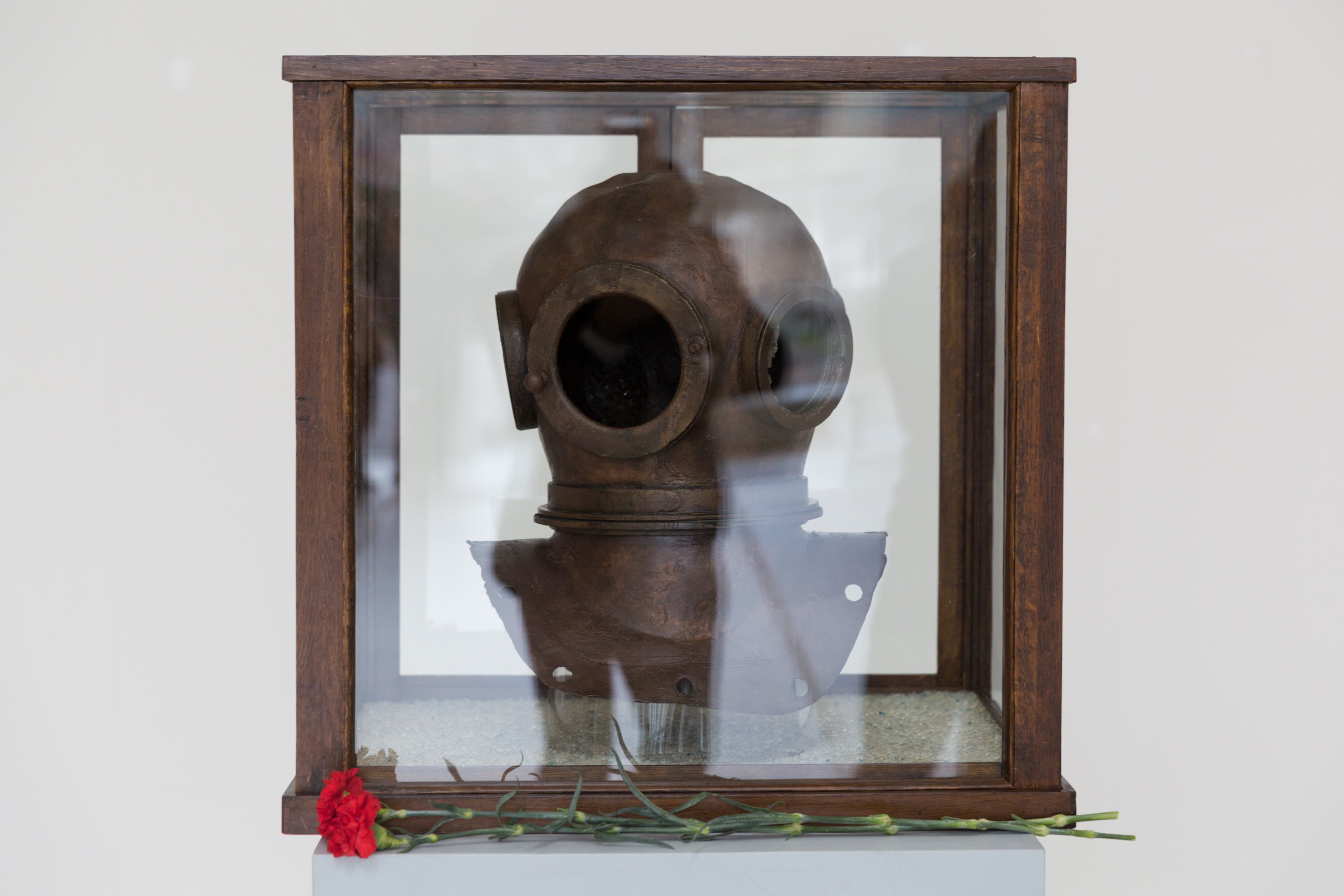
Diving helmet that belonged to the Senior Chief Navy Diver Nikita Sergeyevich Myshlyaevskiy

There are two exhibitions inside the museum, the bigger one is devoted to diving history. The smaller one is devoted to World War II, Leningrad Siege, and Kronstadt military history. The museum houses a wide collection of diving equipment of different times, noteworthy, that all equipment is still operational.

In the collection of the museum there are several diving helmets, including the famous "trechlobatovka", a three-bolt helmet UVS-50M.

There is a room devoted to defense of Kronstadt and soldiers' life during World War II.

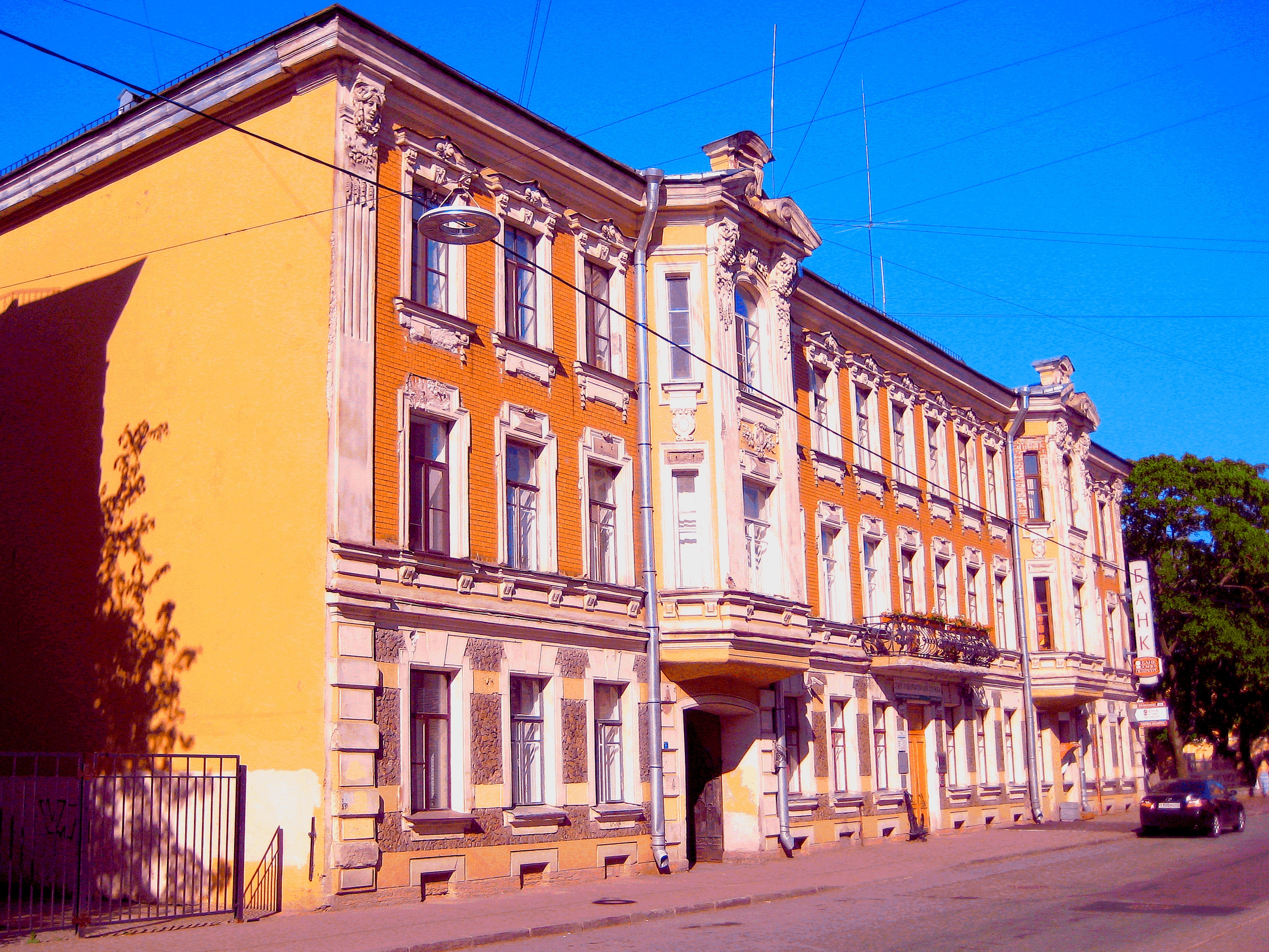
Building of Kronstadt Maritime Museum

== Building ==
The building that houses the Naval Museum was erected at the end of the 19th and belonged to Aleksandr Mikhailovich Britnev.

== Public education ==
The museum houses a lecture hall for meetings, conferences to promote the Russian history and Kronstadt history in particular, diving service, marine archeology, military history among school children and teenagers.
