= War Museum of Kalpaki =

Museum in Kalpaki, Greece

Coordinates: 39.88461°N 20.63151°E

The War Museum of Kalpaki is a museum in Kalpaki, Ioannina, Greece, dedicated to the Greco-Italian War of 1940–1941.
