= Museum of armoured vehicles Smržovka =

- Muzeum obrněné techniky Smržovka
- Location of the museum within Czech Republic
- Established: 1999
- Location: Jana Švermy 1372, Smržovka, Czech Republic, 468 51
- Coordinates: 50.725°N 15.231°E
- Type: Military Museum
- Website: www.tankysmrzovka.cz

The Museum of armoured vehicles Smržovka (Czech: Muzeum obrněné techniky Smržovka) is a museum of military vehicles located in the Czech Republic about 4 kilometers east of Jablonec nad Nisou and about 95 kilometers north-east of Prague. The museum represents the largest private tank collection in Central Europe.

== Tank Collection ==
Cromwell, Comet, Charioteer, Centurion, AMX-13, M36 Jackson, M3A1 Stuart, T-34/85, T-55, T-72, IS-2 (borrowed from Military museum Lešany)

== Other Vehicles ==
OT-810, Ferret Mk.I, CCKW 353, WC-51, M16 Half-track, VT-34, VT-55, Praga V3S, SD-100, VP-90, M53/59 Praga
