= Bojong Kokosan Museum =

Museum in Indonesia

Coordinates: 6.8259°S 106.7601°E

Bojong Kokosan Museum is a museum that was built as the appreciation for the Indonesian fighters against the British army and Civil Administration (NICA) during Netherlands colonialization. The battle occurred in December 1945 to 1946. Bojong Kokosan Museum is located in Jalan Siliwangi number 75 in Sukabumi Regency, West Java, Indonesia.
