= 1912–1913 War Museum =

Coordinates: 39°27′11.3″N 20°52′4.2″E

1912–1913 War Museum (Emin Agha Inn)
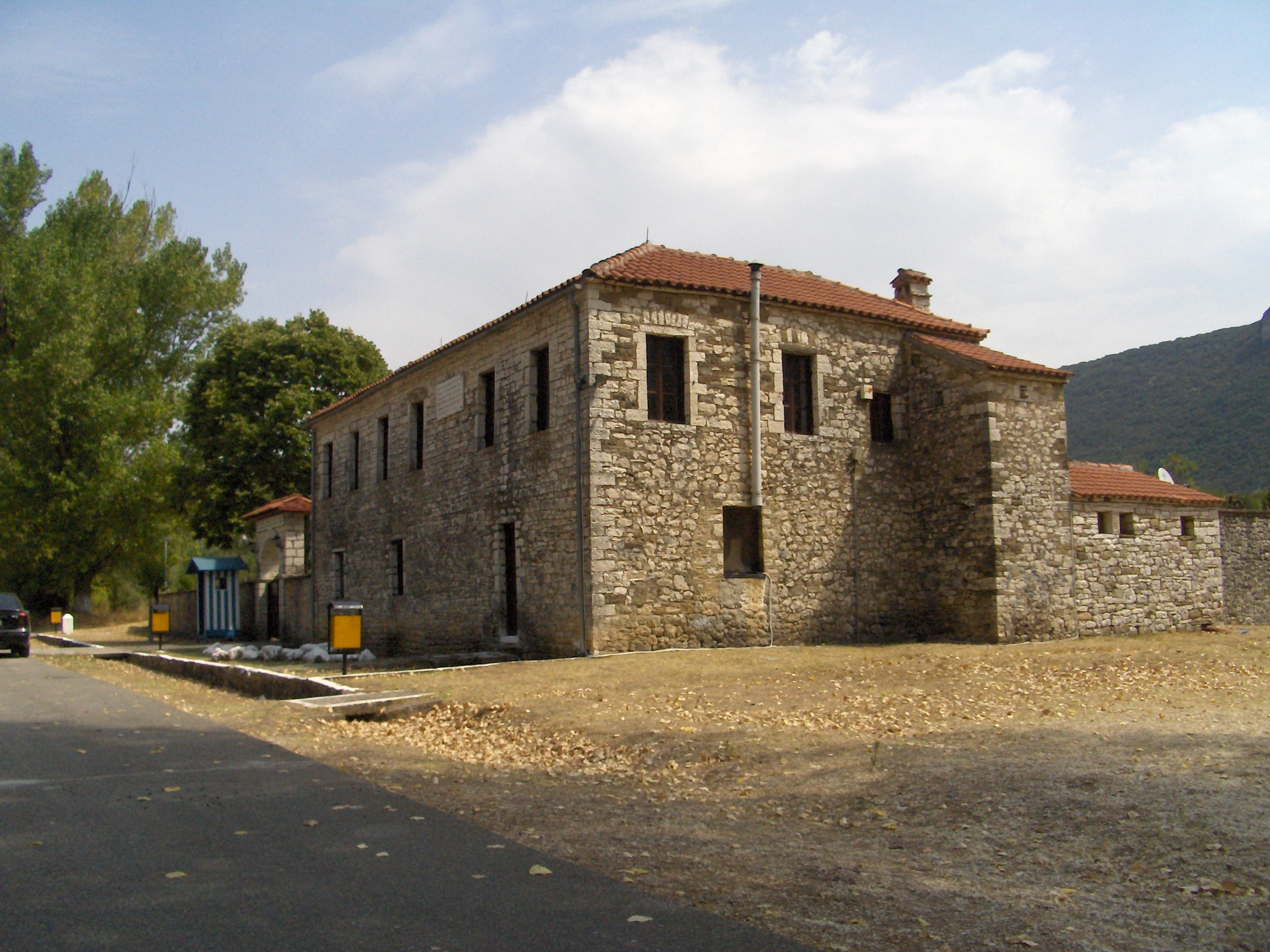
- Established: 1950
- Location: Ioannina, Greece
- Type: War museum

1912–1913 War Museum (Emin Agha Inn) is a museum in Ioannina, Greece. The establishment was used as headquarters during the Balkan Wars. In 1950 the establishments were renovated and the museum was founded. The exhibition includes many paintings, armors, swords, guns and many other objects.

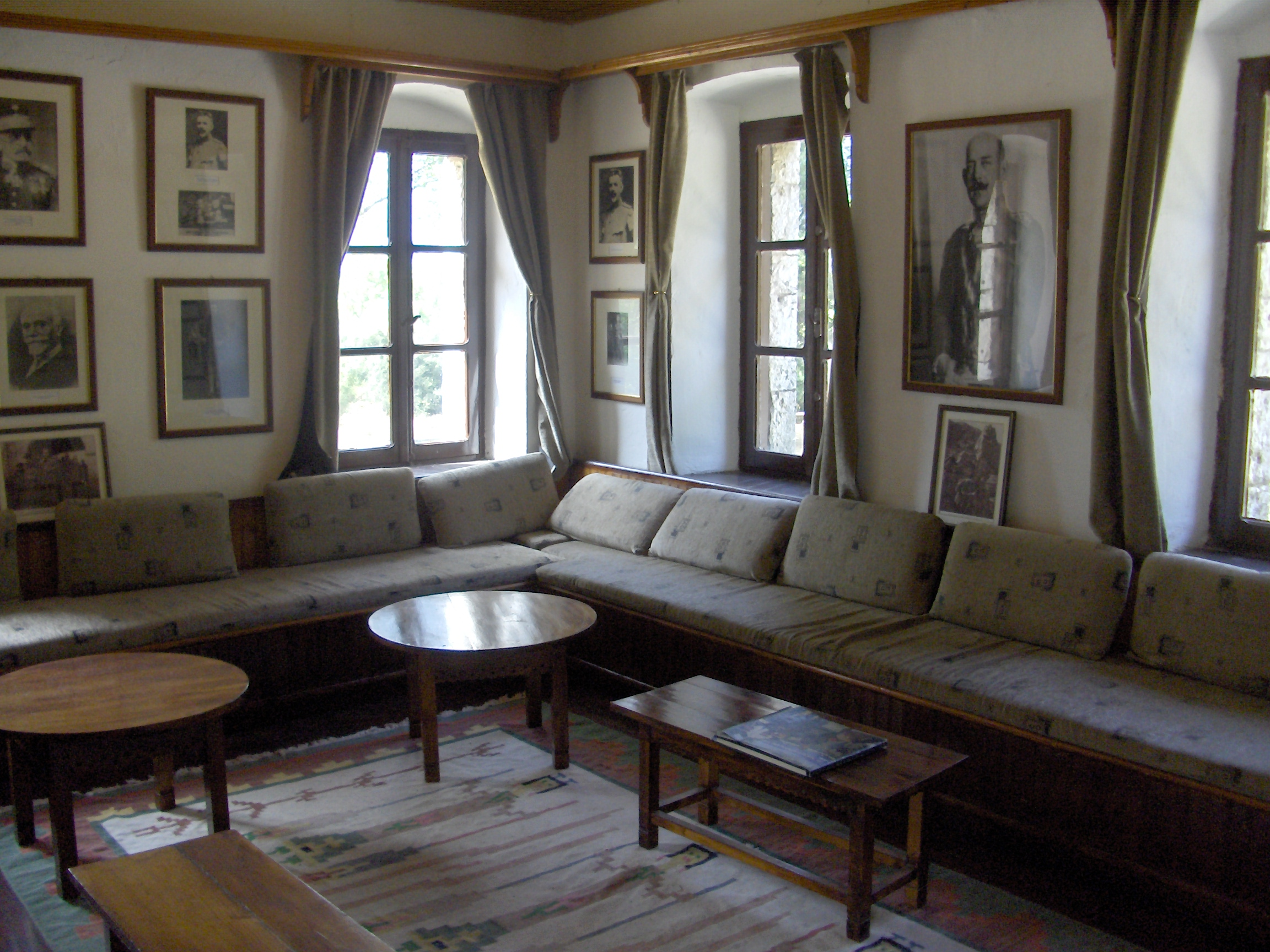
Room of the headquarters at Emin Agha Inn (1912-1913 War Museum)
