= Military Music Museum of Finland =

Coordinates: 60°57′49″N 25°37′24″E

Suomen sotilasmusiikkimuseo The Military Music Museum of Finland
- Established: 2 October 2003 Lahti
- Location: Helsingintie 199 A, FI-15700 LAHTI; N 60°57.820' E 025°37.399'
- Type: military music museum
- Director: administered by Suomen sotilasmusiikkimuseosäätiö (The military music foundation of Finland)
- Website: http://www.phmuseomatka.fi/main.php?id=66 seppo.toivonen (a) phnet.fi

The Military Music Museum was established in a building, that belonged to a local garrison, and was built in 1914. The red-brick building was used as storage for bicycles in 1993 and it was repaired for use as a museum with the help of the European union structural funds in 2003, according to architect Jouko Mattila.

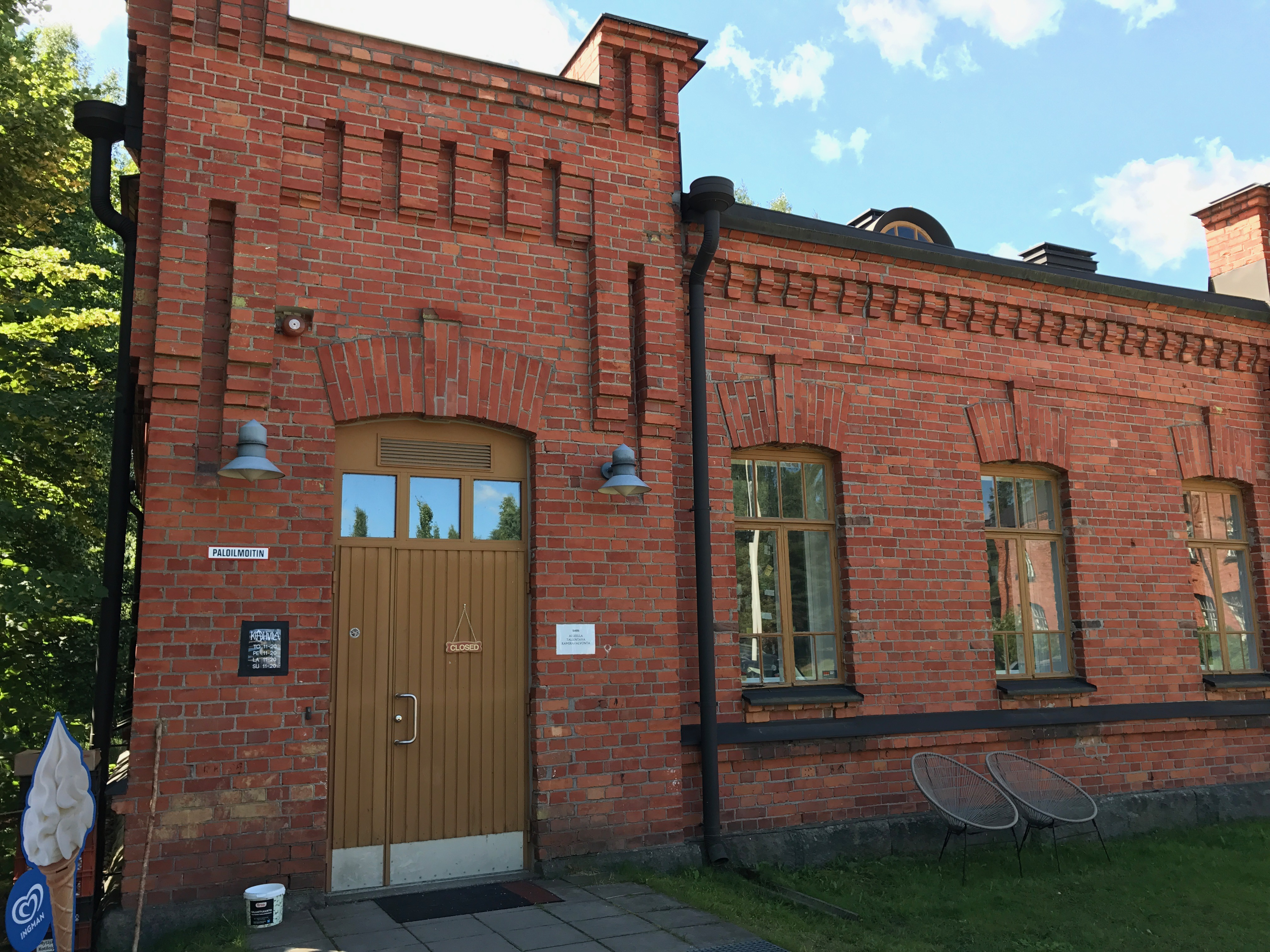

The museum closed permanently in August 2014. The collections were related to the history of Finnish military music. There were also audio samples and photographs presented. Apart from the regular exhibition there were special ones for seasonal themes. Also lectures were given in the military museum and park concerts on the yard of the museum on summer time about two times a month.

The Military Medicine Museum (Sotilaslääketieteen museo) is nearby.

== See also ==
- List of music museums
