= War Between the States Museum =

Coordinates: 34.19613°N 79.77882°W

The War Between the States Museum, in Florence, South Carolina, United States, was founded in 1988 by members of the Sons of Confederate Veterans (SCV), who donated many of the museum's artifacts. The term "War Between the States" was a name for the American Civil War espoused by the Lost Cause of the Confederacy. The museum's collection includes firearms, uniforms, swords, armor, personal items, books, and documents. Photographs of American Civil War soldiers, government officials, civilians, and sailors line the museum's walls. The collection includes items from the Florence Stockade, a Confederate prison camp.
