= Museum of Partisan Glory =

Museum in Odesa Oblast, Ukraine

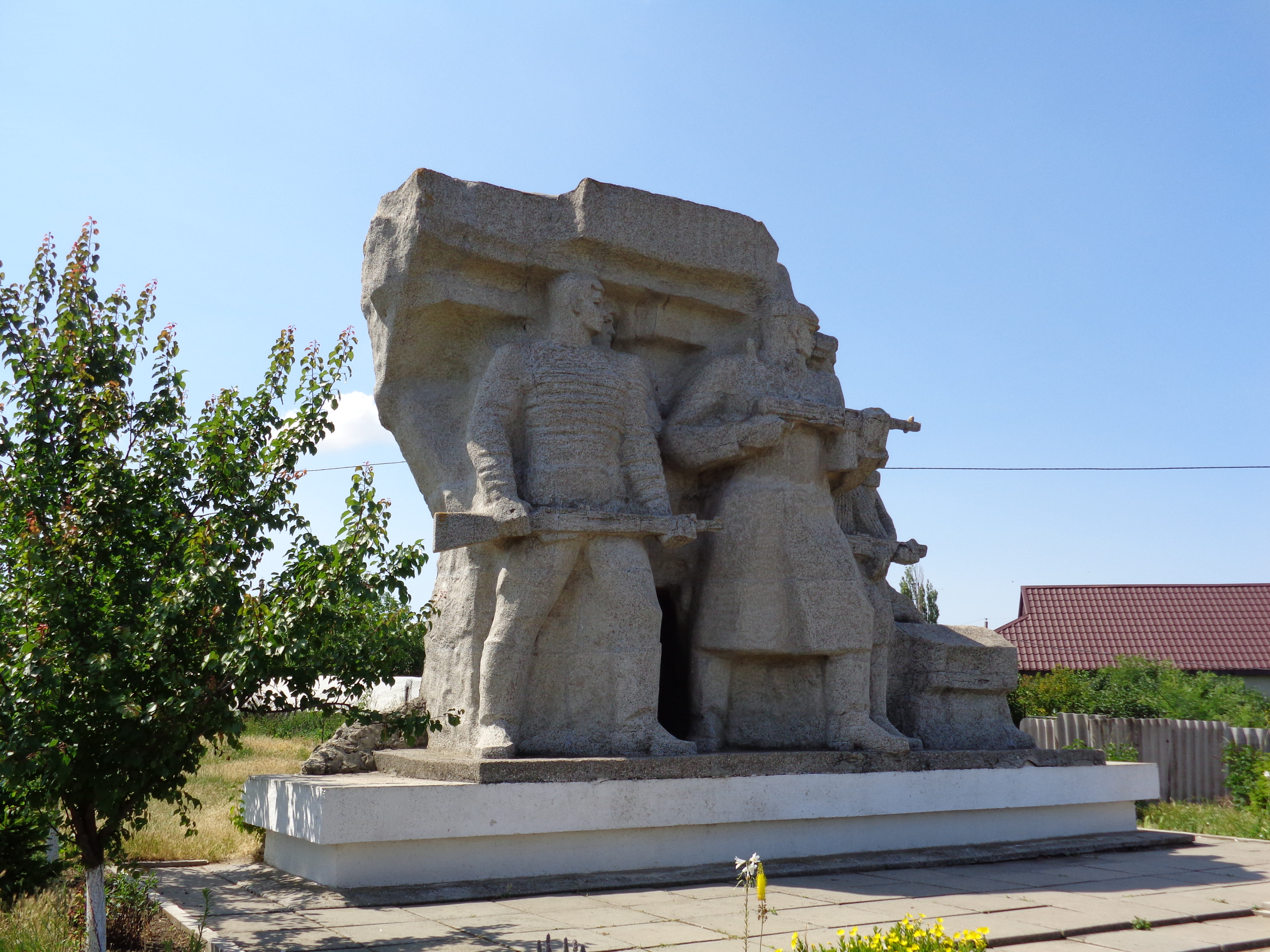
- Established: 1969
- Location: Nerubaiske, Odesa, Ukraine

The Museum of Partisan Glory is an underground museum in Ukraine. It was established in 1969 in the village of Nerubaiske in Odesa Oblast. It was built in an abandoned mine that was used in the construction of Odesa. The catacombs are located at a depth of 12–14 meters. During the Great Patriotic War the catacombs in the village hosted one of the largest guerrilla units in the region. For several centuries coquina was quarried here for the construction of Odesa.

== History ==
The Museum is a monument of the partisan movement in the Odesa region and, in particular, the soldiers of the detachment of the Hero of the Soviet Union Vladimir Molodtsova-Badaeva. Within six months, a 70 person detachment (consist of 64 men, 5 women and commanded by Volodymyr Molodtsov-Badayev) was active in sabotage and intelligence work against the occupying Nazis. Most of them were killed during this time.

== Features ==
The museum use a part of the tunnel as an exhibition for the Hero of the Soviet Union Volodymyr Molodtsov-Badayev unit. Badaevtsev camp is located two kilometers from the main entrance to the catacombs that were flooded by groundwater. However, enthusiasts club researched archival documents and eyewitnesses and restored its original appearance.
