= Rustkammeret =

Army Museum, World War II museum in Archbishop's Palace, Trondheim

"The Armoury" Army museum in Trondheim
- Rustkammeret i Trondheim
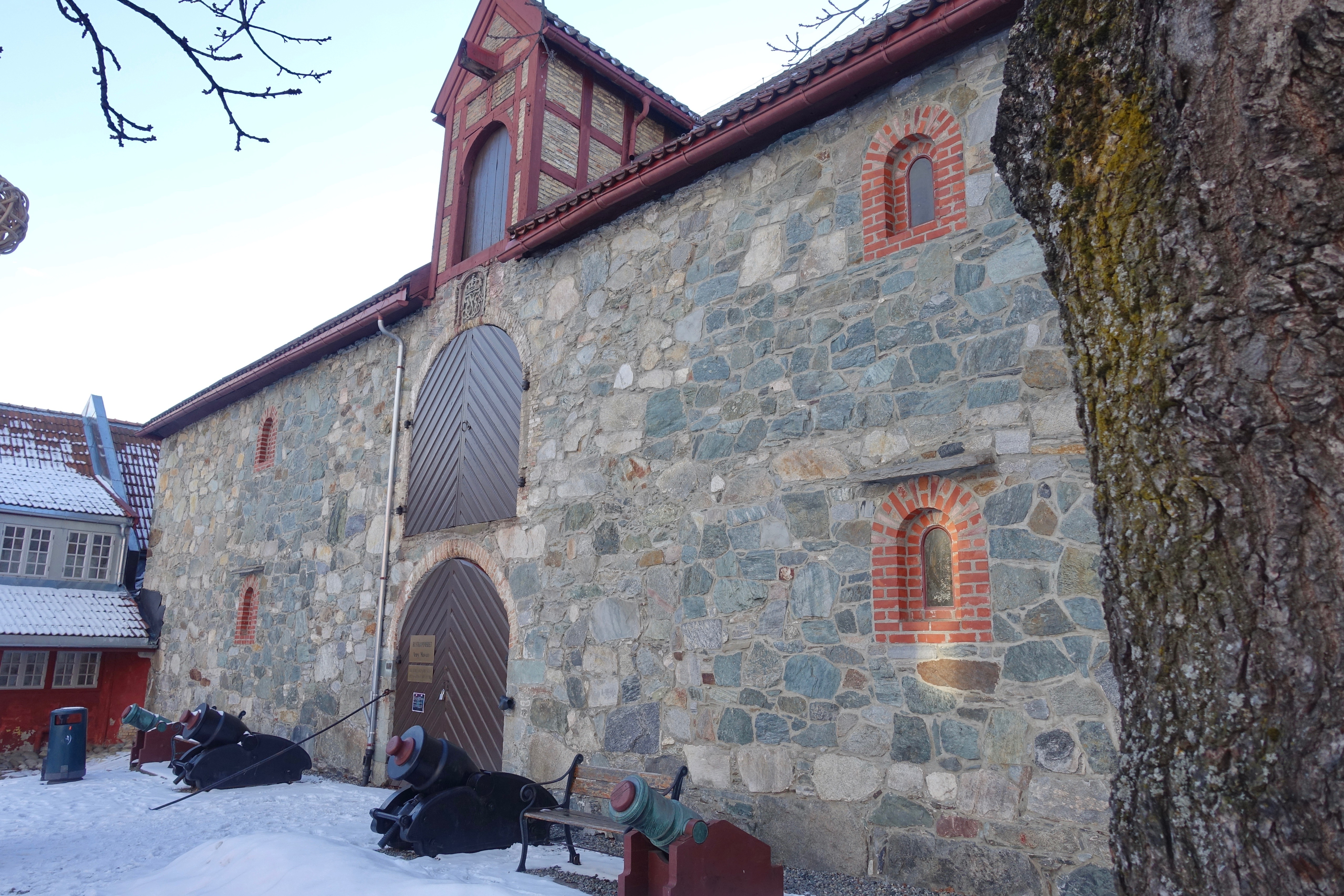
- Established: 1826
- Location: Archbishop's Palace, Trondheim
- Type: Army Museum, World War II museum

"The Armoury" Army Museum in Trondheim (Norwegian: Rustkammeret i Trondheim) is a military museum in the Archbishop's Palace (Erkebispegården) in Trondheim, Norway. Today it is a Norwegian army museum as well as a resistance museum, emphasizing the military history of Trøndelag.

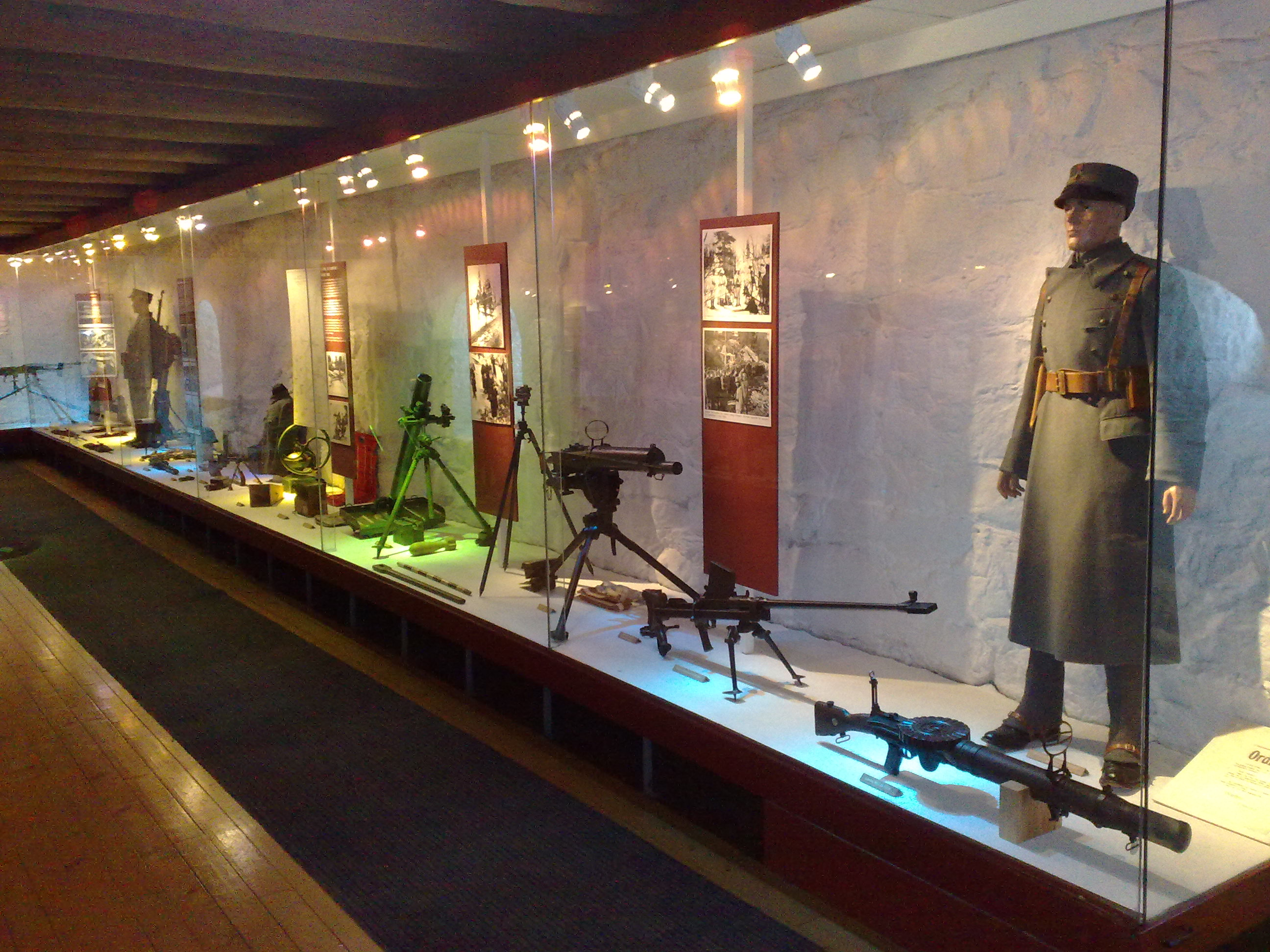
Military equipment of Norway during World War II at display in the "Armoury" Army Museum in Trondheim.

The museum has weapons, uniforms and other artifacts on display, starting with the Viking Age, going through the Middle Ages and the Norwegian union with Denmark (1380–1814) and later with Sweden (1814–1905), up to the German occupation of Norway during World War II (1940–1945).
