= Gifu Sekigahara Battlefield Memorial Museum =

- 岐阜関ケ原古戦場記念館
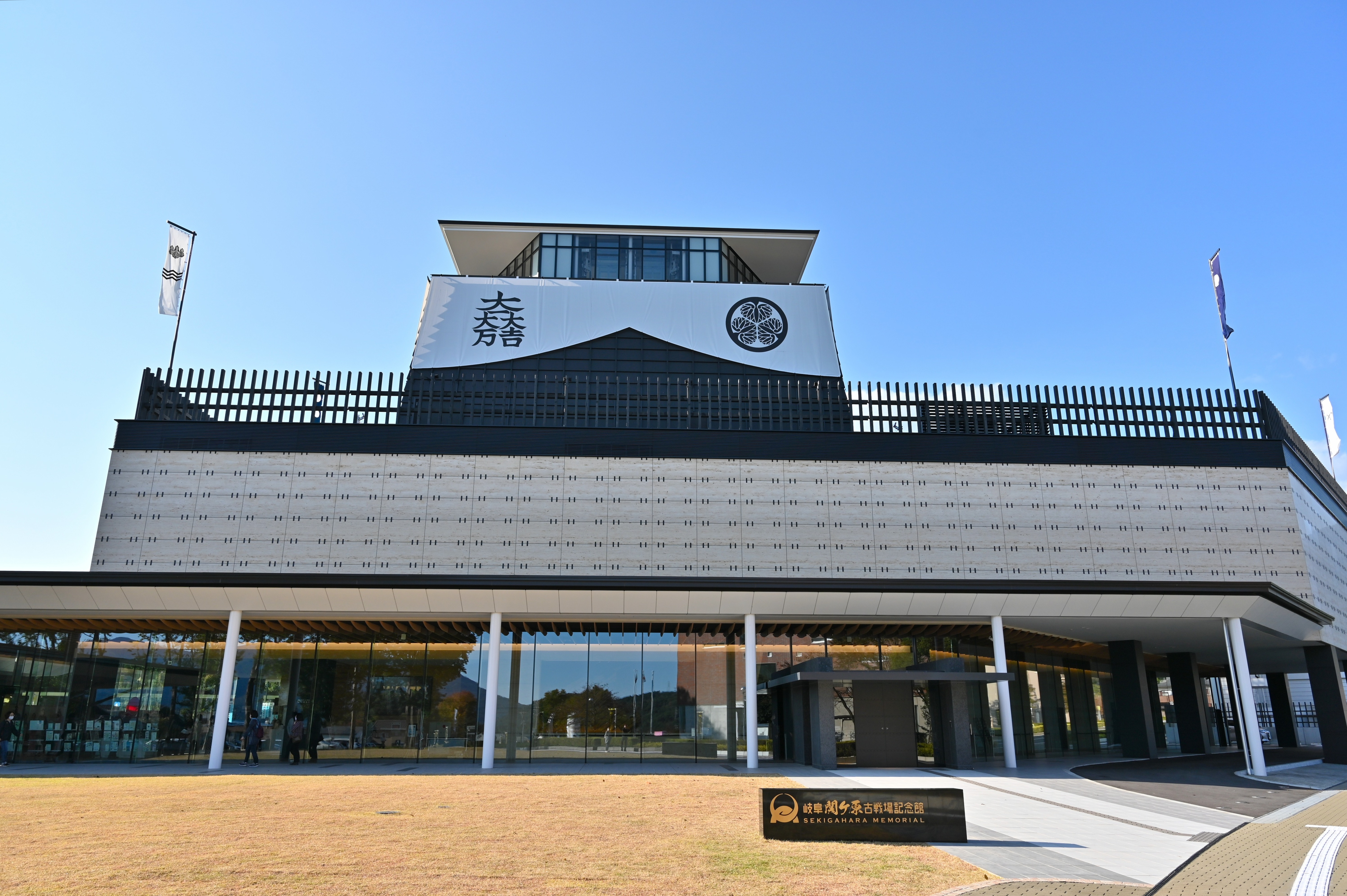
- Interactive map of the Gifu Sekigahara Battlefield Memorial Museum area

General information
- Location: 894-55 Sekigahara, Gifu Prefecture, Japan
- Coordinates: 35°21′56″N 136°27′59″E
- Opened: 21 October 2020

Website
- Official website

The Gifu Sekigahara Battlefield Memorial Museum (岐阜関ケ原古戦場記念館, Gifu Sekigahara Kosenjō Kinenkan) opened in Sekigahara, Gifu Prefecture, Japan in 2020. It tells the story of the 1600 Battle of Sekigahara and promotes the "charm and fascination" of the battlefield, which has been designated a national Historic Site. The Sekigahara Town History and Folklore Museum (関ケ原町歴史民俗学習館) opened in an adjacent facility on the same day.

== See also ==
- List of Historic Sites of Japan (Gifu)
- Gifu Prefectural Museum
- Sengoku period
- Tokugawa shogunate
