= Museum of the Battle of Crete and the National Resistance =

Museum in Heraklion, Crete

Coordinates: 35°20′21.8″N 25°08′17.8″E

A polygraph used by the Greek resistance during World War II. Museum of National Resistance of Ilioupoli.

The Museum of the Battle of Crete and the National Resistance (Greek: Μουσείο Μάχης Κρήτης και Εθνικής Αντίστασης) is a municipal historical museum dedicated to the defense of Crete during WWII and the popular resistance of Crete. It is located near the Heraklion Archaeological Museum in the city of Heraklion on the island of Crete, Greece.

It was founded by the Municipality of Heraklion in May 1994. The museum's aim is to collect, preserve and exhibit relics from the period 1941–1945 in an appropriate manner, as well as to document and disseminate information on the people's struggle during the Battle of Crete and the subsequent German-Italian occupation.

In addition to presenting a range of material witnesses to the past, the museum aims to cultivate interest and respect for the history of Crete.
