= Military Museum of Butte County =

Museum in Oroville, California, United States

- Location in California
- Location: Oroville, California,
- Coordinates: 39°47′40″N 121°57′9″W
- Type: History museum
- Website: surpluscity.com/mmbc/index.html

The Military Museum of Butte County collects, preserves, and displays the military history of California. The museum is located at 4514 Pacific Heights Road in Oroville, California.

== Displays ==
The museum displays weapons, uniforms, supply wagons, acc. as well as includes exhibits, such as the one that describes a U.S. 7th Cavalry pursuit of Pancho Villa during the Mexican Revolution (early 1910s). Notably there is a 1917 Browning machine gun, as well as a World War I infantry uniform. World War II items include a 1940 M1 carbine, an English air raid siren, a 22mm Laudi antitank gun, a 1943 Swiss ammunition wagon, a British paratrooper cart, and a 1942 M16 halftrack. The Vietnam War era artifacts include a jungle penetrator used to rescue downed pilots.
