= Peace Museum of Saitama =

- 埼玉県平和資料館
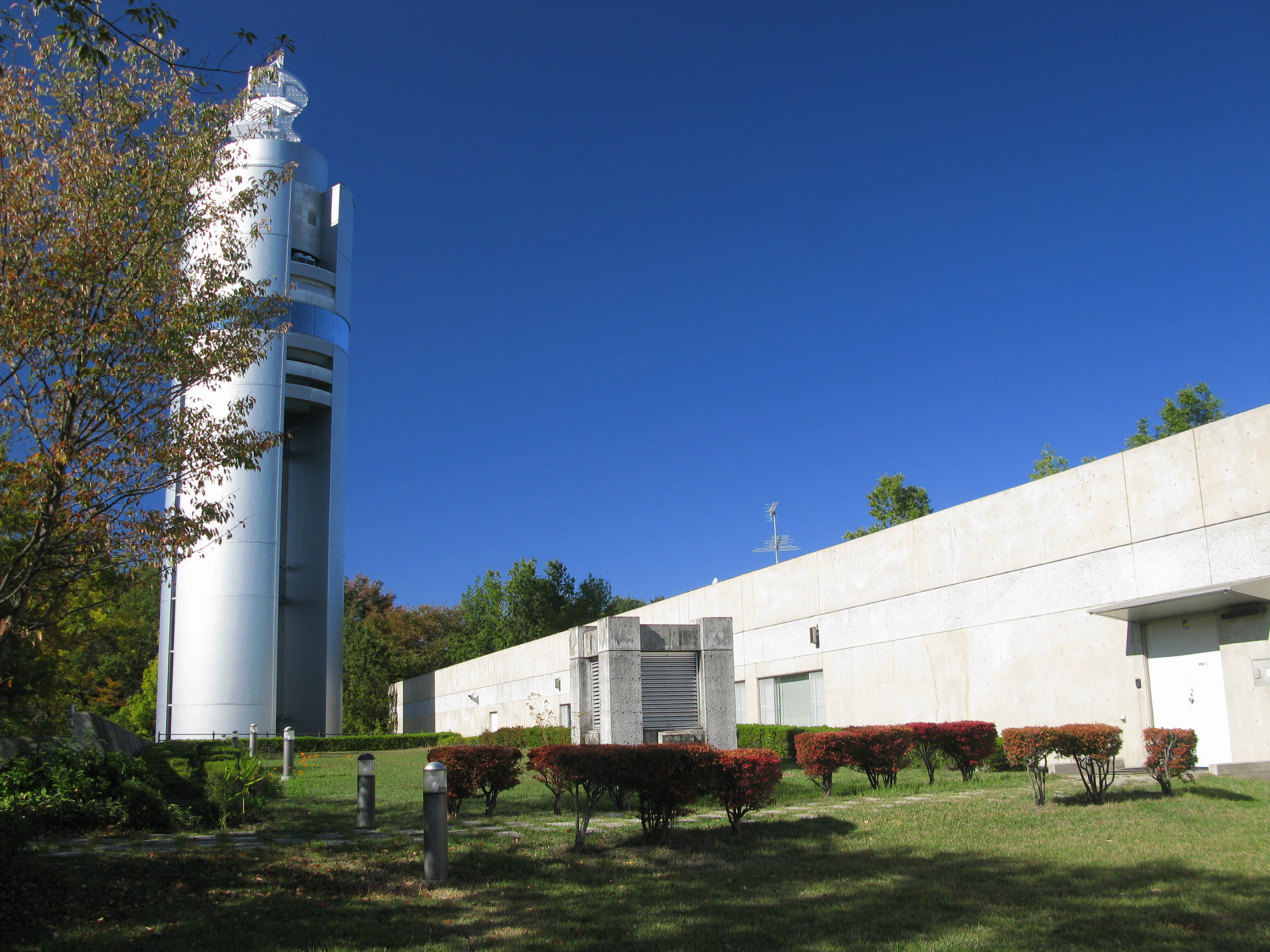
- Interactive map of the Peace Museum of Saitama area

General information
- Location: 241-113 Iwadono, Higashimatsuyama, Saitama Prefecture, Japan
- Coordinates: 35°59′55″N 139°21′56″E
- Opened: August 1993

Website
- Official website

The Peace Museum of Saitama (埼玉県平和資料館, Saitama-ken Heiwa Shiryōkan) opened in Higashimatsuyama, Saitama Prefecture, Japan, in 1993. The museum collects and exhibits materials relating to the burgeoning militarism of the early Shōwa era and to the Pacific War, with a particular focus on the connection of these events with Saitama Prefecture.

== See also ==
- The Hiroshima Panels
