= The Second World War Experience Centre =

Museum in Otley, West Yorkshire, England

Coordinates: 53.917°N 1.314°W

The Second World War Experience Centre, SWWEC, based in Otley, West Yorkshire, England, is a registered charity and museum/archive which was set up in 1998 to preserve personal memories of the Second World War before they are lost forever. The archive is international in scope and holds letters, diaries, photographs and papers donated by individuals - the collection is unique as it concentrates only on the Second World War and personal experience. A network of volunteers across the UK recorded veterans' memories for the Centre, and its collection now numbers in excess of 9000 lives.

The Centre is used by researchers, students, schoolchildren, authors and members of the public studying for degrees, books or simply their family history. The Centre's mission is "To collect and encourage access to the surviving testimony of men and women who lived through the years of the Second World War, and to ensure that different audiences share and learn from the personal recollections preserved in the collection".
