= Engineers Museum =

Scientific military history museum in Finland

- Finnish: Pioneerimuseo; Swedish: Pioniermuseum
- Established: 12 May 1945 in Koria, Finland
- Dissolved: 2012; merged with the National Signals Museum and The Artillery Museum of Finland to form Museo Militaria
- Location: 1945–2004: Koria; 2007–2012: Miehikkälä; 2012–present: Hämeenlinna
- Coordinates: 61°00′18.1″N 24°27′26.0″E
- Type: Science museum
- Visitors: From 1,800 to 2,200 annually
- Directors: Lieutenant colonel, retired, Jaakko Martikainen

The Engineers Museum (also known as the Engineer Museum, the Pioneer Museum or the Sapper Museum; Finnish: Valtakunnallinen Pioneerimuseo, lit. 'National Pioneer Museum') was a military engineering museum in Finland. It was the oldest corps museum in Finland. It was opened on 13 May 1945 in the garrison of Koria, which was the part of Elimäki municipality, now Kouvola town. The Engineers Museum had the status of the scientific military museum and it was supervised by the Military Museum of Finland (Finnish: Sotamuseo). The Engineers Museum was re-opened in Miehikkälä in 2007. In 2012, the Engineers Museum merged with the National Signals Museum and The Artillery Museum of Finland to form Museo Militaria in Hämeenlinna.

There are two other attractions related to the Engineer corps of Finland: the Salpa Line Museum in Miehikkälä and the Bunker Museum in Virolahti.

== History ==
The history of the museum started in 1929, when second lieutenant Eero-Eetu Saarinen made a proposal to the commander of the engineer battalion, concerning an engineer corps museum. The engineer troops started to collect materials for the museum, but the collection was lost during the Winter War.

On 12 May 1945, lieutenant colonel Eero-Eetu Saarinen delivered an opening speech of the museum. The museum was located in the barracks until 1965, when the municipality of Elimäki donated a log house to the museum, so it could become enlarged.

By the beginning of the 1970s, it became obvious that a new building would be needed. In the Koria garrison area, which was the main base of the Engineers corps, a new main building was built and opened by lieutenant colonel Eero-Eetu Saarinen on 25 July 1974 in Kivimäki of Koria. The next year, in 1975, the Pioneeriaselajin Liitto ry, was established to govern the museum.

The other building was built and opened in 1976. The construction site manager and inspector was military technician Arvo Tolmunen. The corps museum was granted an officials status as an official war historical museum by the minister of defence, Veikko Pihlajamäki, on 24 March 1987.

When the Kymi Engineer Battalion was moved from Koria to the Vekaranjärvi garrison of the Karelia Brigade, the museum in Koria was closed and the exhibits were packed and delivered to other locations. Most of the exhibits ended up to Kouvola and were burned also a kind of vandalism destroyed the materials.

=== New start ===
Kouvola municipality had planned to support the museum, but the idea did not survive, so that the registered Union of the Engineers Corps. Until the beginning of the 2000s, a new plan was made in cooperation with Miehikkälä municipality. In 2003, a project for opening the museum was started with the financial help of the European Union structural funds. The general headquarters did not take the museum to the category of the further developed museums on 4 March 2004, but it was added to the list on 18 May 2005.

=== Merger ===
In 2012, the Engineers Museum merged with the National Signals Museum and The Artillery Museum of Finland to form Museo Militaria in Hämeenlinna.

== Exhibitions ==
The museum had a relatively small number of visitors due to the distant location. In the same region there are two other museums related to the military engineering: the Salpa Line Museum and the Bunker Museum (Bunkkerimuseo).

=== Main building ===
In the main exhibition there were about 500 exhibits. Specialities in the main building were models of the Kiviniemi, Vuoksi and Syvärinniska field bridges. On the other half of the main building there was Pitäjämuseo, a local rural museum that presented the past agrarian life from the point of view of the household woodware.

==== Kiviniemi bridge ====
There have been at least six bridges over the Vuoksi river in Sakkola. The first known bridge was a wooden bridge in the 1800s, which was replaced by a stone bridge in 1827. The Vuoksi river was enlarged and the flow eroded the soil structures of the stone bridge, so that it had to be break down. Nordestam senate in 1870 authorised rebuilding, which was started in 1878, but the works ended during the first phases of the construction works.

According to the next plan the new bridge was to be built, in the new place, onto the narrowest part of the Kiviniemi falls area, 300 metres (980 ft) further from the place, where the bridge had been two times. The new length of the bridge would be 74.8 metres (245 ft). The construction works started in winter 1876 and the bridge was opened for the traffic in 1878. The budget of the construction works reached 139,000 Finnish marks.

During the Winter War, the Finns blew up the bridge. The Soviets built another bridge from steel after the Moscow Peace Treaty of 1940 in the inter-war period. Before the advancing Finnish troops reached the bridge, the Soviet troops blew up the bridge in the beginning of the Continuation War in 1941. The Finns built a railway bridge from steel, which was destroyed in 1944. Now there is a Soviet made bridge made of steel crossing Vuoksi.

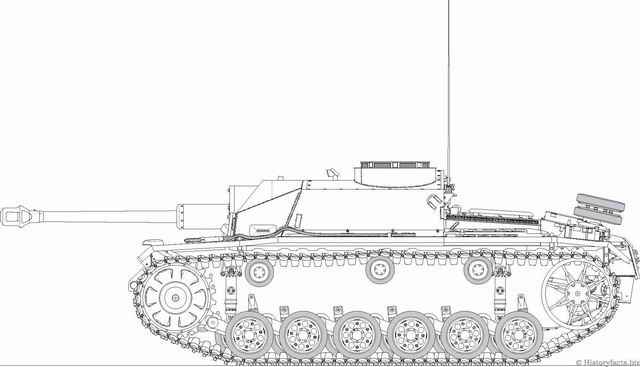
An anti-tank armoured assault vehicle Sturmgeschütz III Ausf. G

=== Front yard and backyard ===
There was a Sturmgeschütz III Ausf. G on the frontyard of the museum. On the backyard there were several aluminic assault boats, KrAZ lorry with and without a pontoon bridge equipment. The heaviest vehicle was a T-72 main battle tank with a mine plough.

== Collections ==
There were about 3,700 collectibles in the museum.

== Salpa Centre ==
The Salpa Centre (Salpakeskus), which was established on 7 July 2005, is a voluntary consortium of four participating communities: The Engineers Museum (governed by the Union of the Engineer Corps), the Salpa (Defence) Line Museum, both in Miehikkälä, the Salpa Line Tradition Association (Salpalinjan perinneyhdistys ry) and the Bunker Museum in Virolahti.

The parties have been cooperation in developing the Bunker Museum, Engineers Museum and Salpa Line Museum with the support of the European Union structural funds for less than a decade.

On the Salpa defence line there will be organised annually a hiking tour. The 19th Salpa trekking was to take place in 2012 from 29 June to 1 July. The Salpa defence line is in some parts relatively good condition as it was never needed due to the truce of 5 September 1944 and the Moscow Armistice on 19 September 1944, which ended the co-belligerence of Finland with the Greater German Realm and made the Lapland War inevitable.
