= Military Museum of Finland =

- Sotamuseo (in Finnish); Krigsmuseet (in Swedish)
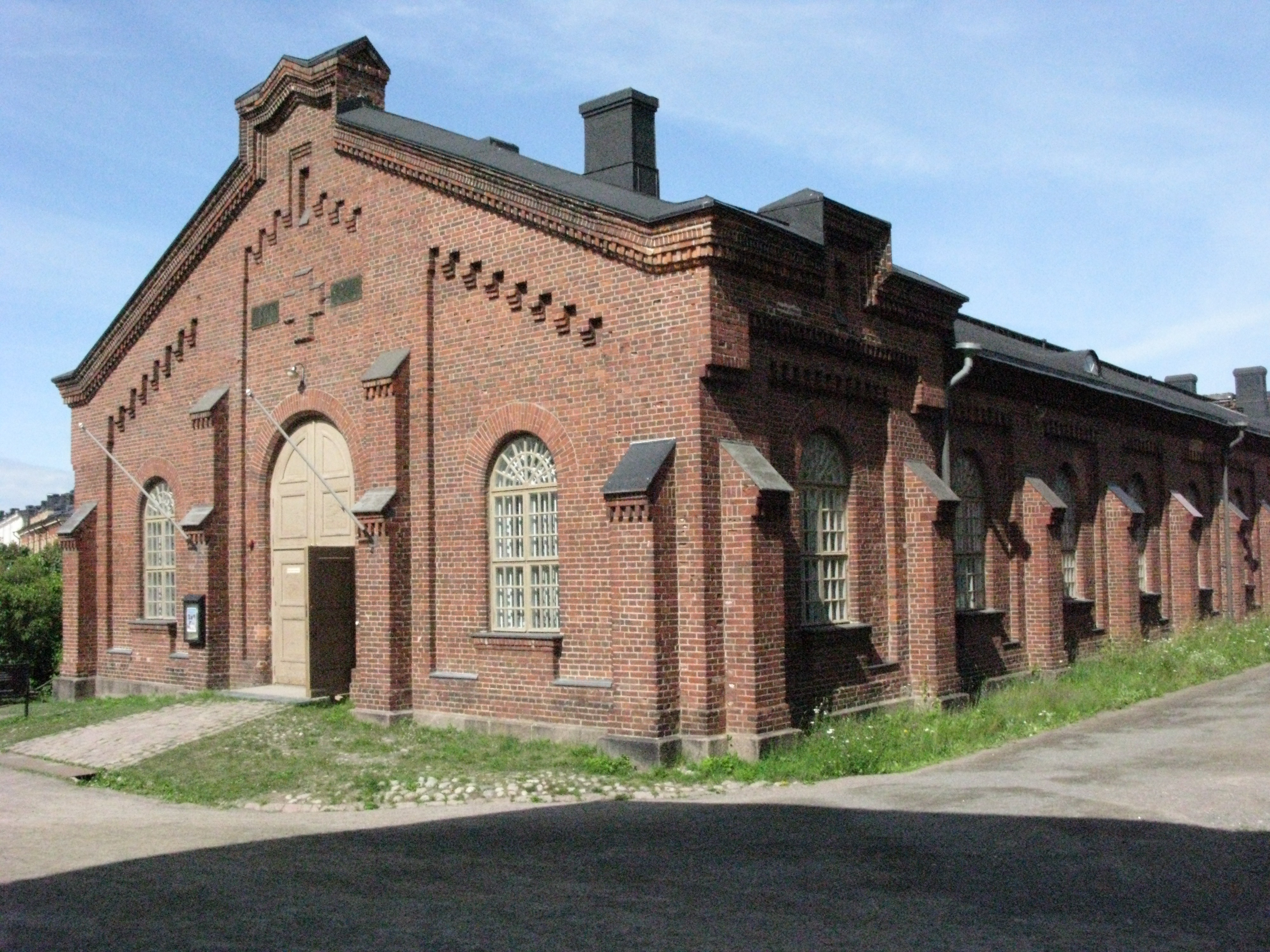
- Interactive map of the Military Museum of Finland area

General information
- Type: Museum
- Location: Helsinki, Suomenlinna
- Coordinates: 60.1459°N 24.9893°E
- Completed: 1881
- Inaugurated: 1929

Design and construction
- Architect: Greifon

The Military Museum of Finland (Finnish: Sotamuseo) is the central museum of the Finnish Defence Forces and the national special museum of military history. It is located in Helsinki and it is part of the Finnish National Defence University. In 2018, the Military Museum's exhibitions in Suomenlinna had around 131,000 visitors. The most popular exhibition is the submarine Vesikko, visited by around 50,000 people annually. Military Museum's exhibitions in Suomenlinna are located at Manege and Artillery Maneage.

The Military Museum's task is to collect, preserve, research and display artifacts and other heritage related to the development of the Defence Forces of Finland, Finland's military history and to the history of weaponry.

As of 2016, the museum's exhibition locations at Liisankatu 1 and Maurinkatu 1 are closed.

== History ==
The Military Museum was founded November 25, 1929. The opening ceremony followed on October 18, 1930, at Liisankatu, Kruununhaka. Before the foundation, Finnish military history was first shown to the public in 1908 at Valtion historiallinen museo (The History Museum of the State) and later in 1918–1919 at the National Museum. The former exhibition's theme was The War of 1808–1809 and latter's Finnish Civil War.

In January 1930, The Ministry of Defence ordered the Military Museum to continue in Suomenlinna Sea Fortress, where the building Bastion Carpelan was reserved for the museum's use. Lieutenant Reijo Wilhelm Palmroth was elected as museum manager. The opening ceremony took place on June 11, 1933, and in the following years the museum was annually visited by around 9254 people. The exhibition consisted of different arms sections which included jaegers, engineers, arms and navy. There were also civil war collections to be seen.

In the autumn of 1939, just before the breakout of the Winter War against the Soviet Union, the Military Museum was closed down. The items and collections were removed from bastion Carpelan during the war and stored around Finland. Even the museum's office had to be relocated from Helsinki because of the Soviet air bombings in 1944.

During the Winter War and Continuation War, the Military Museum organized a series of exhibitions at the Exhibition Hall. The first was Sotasaalisnäyttely (War Looting Exhibition) in February 1940 which was shortly followed by the Sotamuistonäyttely (War Memories Exhibition) I and II in 1941. The Military Museum also organized touring exhibitions around Finland between 1941 and 1943 and even had exhibitions in Sweden in 1942–43. There were several purposes for these kinds of war exhibitions. It was, for example, a means to gather funds for war invalids and their families, to show how it was to fight on Finnish side at the front, and to lift up morale among citizens.

1944 was the year of the foundation of Sotamuistoyhdistys, later to be named Suomen sotahistoriallinen seura (The Association for Military History in Finland). The association is an independent unit but it is run in a close relationship with the Military Museum. Its goal is to cherish the memory of Finnish wars in various ways.

After the war, the Military Museum had to manage without exhibition halls for a short period of time. The situation changed when it received a hall at Maurinkatu, Kruununhaka. The Military Museum expanded more in the mid-1990s after setting up an exhibition also at Liisankatu. In March 2013, a new exhibition was opened there, but only three years later, in 2016, the exhibition at Kruununhaka was permanently closed. The Military Museum's only exhibitions are now located at the Manege building on Suomenlinna island.

Military Museum's presence in Suomenlinna ceased shortly at the brink of Winter War in 1939. The collections in Bastion Carpelan were moved to the mainland and later the Military Museum had to make way for the Armfelt Museum. However, there had been thoughts and debate about founding a Coastal Artillery Museum and Naval Museum in Suomenlinna in 1946–1948 and in the end, the Coastal Artillery Museum was opened in December 1948. The exhibition's time range was from autonomy to the times of independence. The museum was closed in 2007 because the building was considered too unsound.

The Naval Museum opened its doors on 6 November 1948 although considerations about the exhibition had been made already in 1923. The exhibition showed Finnish naval defence during her independence era but in the end it didn't last long. Museum was ordered to close in 1963 due to high moisture and didn't manage to find new exhibition hall.

In the 1970s there emerged a series of debates about opening the Military Museum exhibition again in Suomenlinna in addition to submarine Vesikko, which had been open for the public as a museum since July 1973. After a number of failures, the Military Museum managed to obtain the necessary permit in August 1980. The Manege, which had been storage for the Military Museum since 1974, was constructed to an exhibition hall during 1986–1989. The opening followed June 1, 1989. From 2012, the Military Museum's Manege has showcased an exhibition called From Autonomy to Atalanta.

The Military Museum organized over 30 special exhibitions during 1962–1984. Among these are exhibitions for the 40th and 90th anniversaries of the Finnish Defence Forces in 1958 and 2008 respectively and several Winter War exhibitions.

== Collections ==
The collections of the Military Museum cover over 200,000 artifacts. Most artifacts are organized in research collections or stored. The collections include weapons, uniforms, medals, artworks, flags and vehicles among other things. One exhibit area is dedicated to Finnish war hero Lauri Törni, who received the Mannerheim Cross.

== Publications ==
The Military Museum publishes the Journal of Military History (Sotahistoriallinen Aikakauskirja) together with The Military History Society of Finland annually and has also created content to various multimedia publications.

== Exhibitions ==
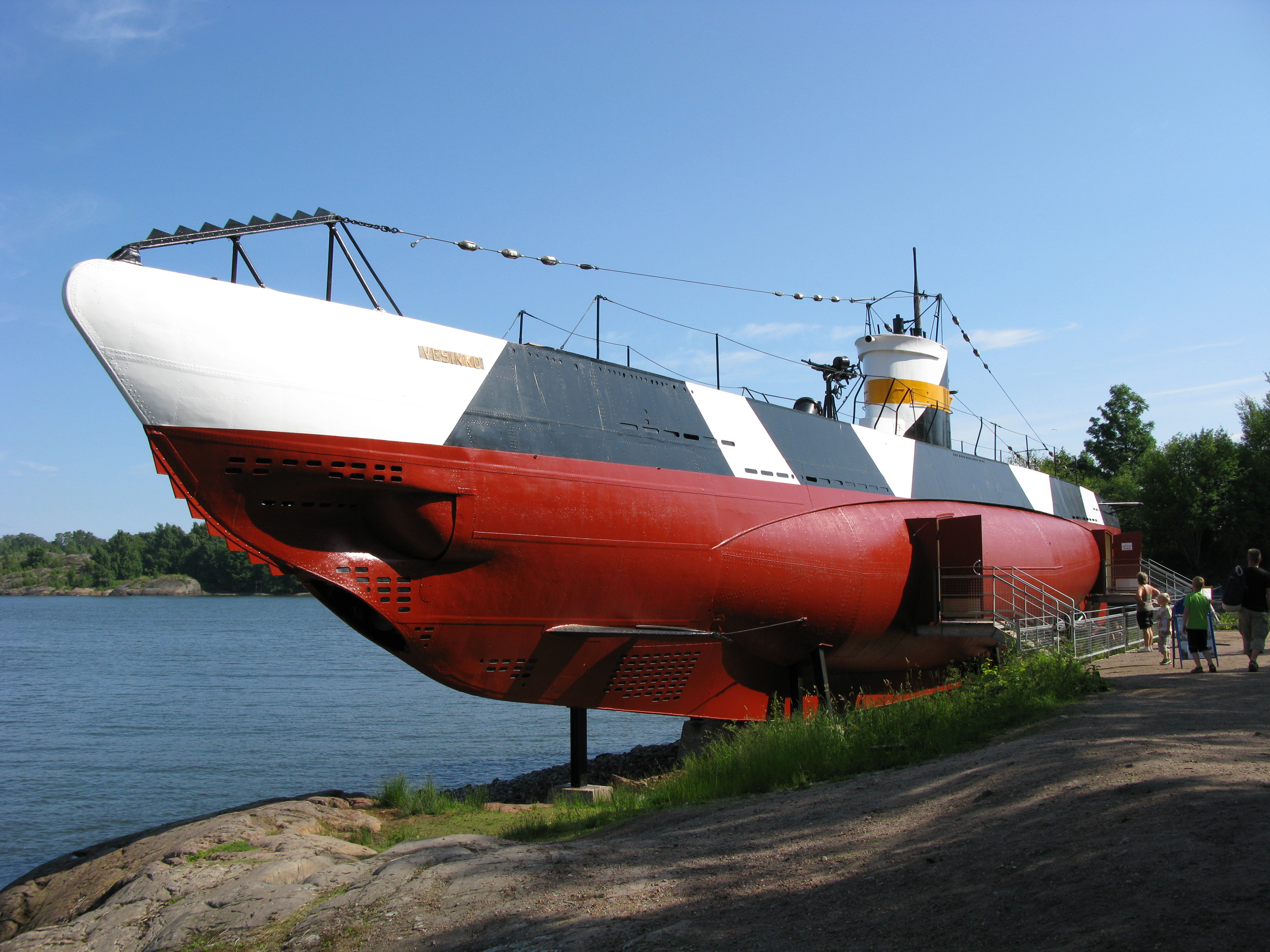
Vesikko

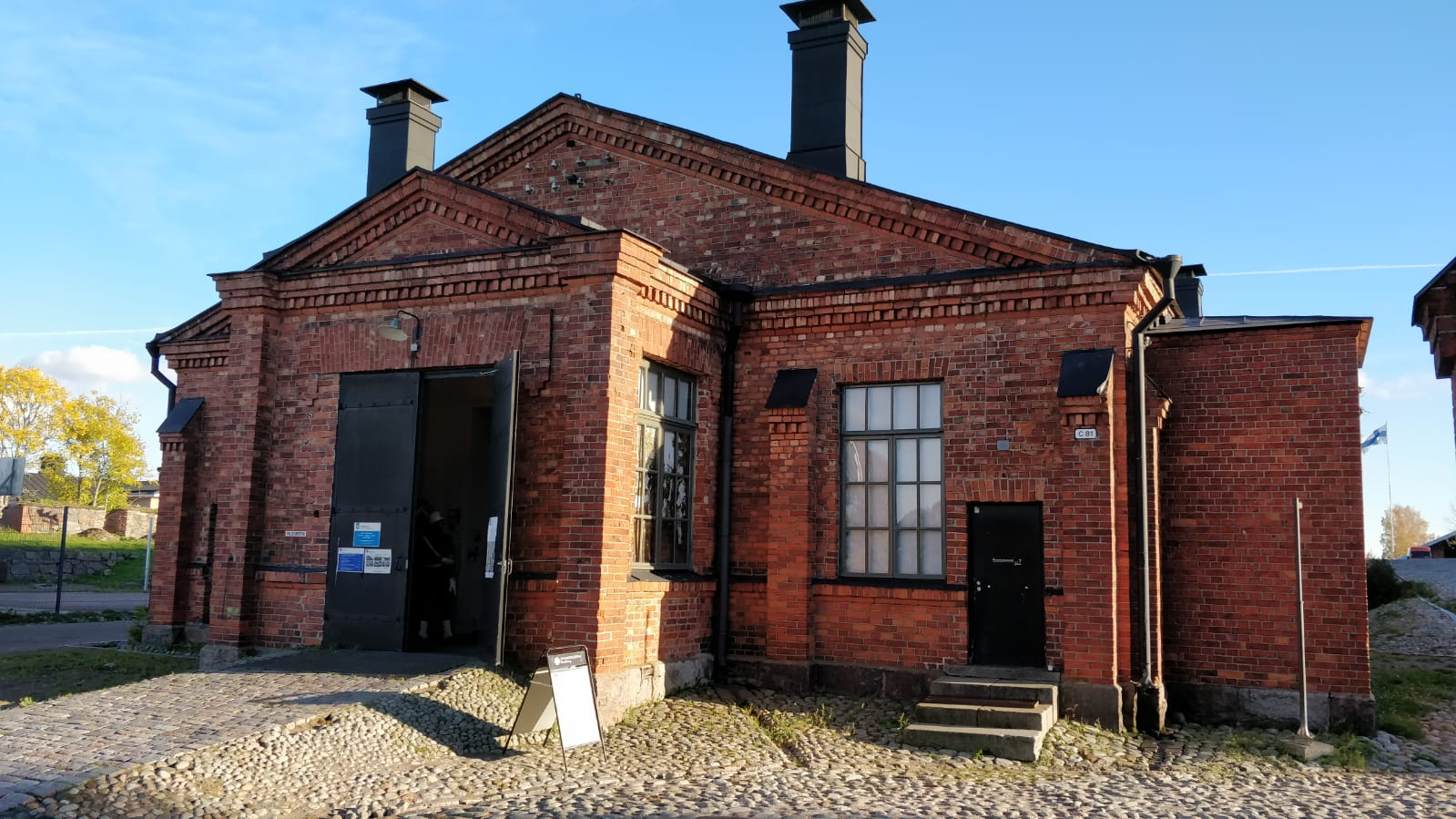
Artillery Manege

The Military Museum's former permanent exhibition at Liisankatu displayed Finnish military history since the beginning of the fifteenth century. The main focus was in the 19th century. The exhibition at Liisankatu 1 is now permanently closed.

=== Submarine Vesikko ===
Vesikko is a Finnish submarine built in 1933 that served in the second World War in the Gulf of Finland, now on the summer time exhibition in Suomenlinna. Vesikko is the only remaining submarine of the Finnish Fleet during the World War II. Other four U-boats were scrapped in 1953. During the Winter War and the Continuation war 1939–1944 Vesikko was in active service, conducting patrol and safeguard missions in the Gulf of Finland and Åland archipelago. Vesikko managed to destroy one enemy transport ship as it sank Soviet Vyborg July 3, 1941 near Suursaari. After the peace treaty with the Soviet Union, Vesikko’s days in active service were over because The Peace Treaty of 1947 forbade Finland from owning and operating submarines. Vesikko was however saved for Finnish Navy's possible later educational purposes. But no use emerged for Vesikko and it was transferred to Katajanokka dockyard. The state planned to sell it in 1959 but thanks to the ex-submariners' strong lobbying, the submarine was once again saved and transported from Katajanokka to Suomenlinna in the early 1960s. After opening as a museum July 9, 1973 it has become the Military Museum's most popular exhibition.

== Manege Military Museum ==
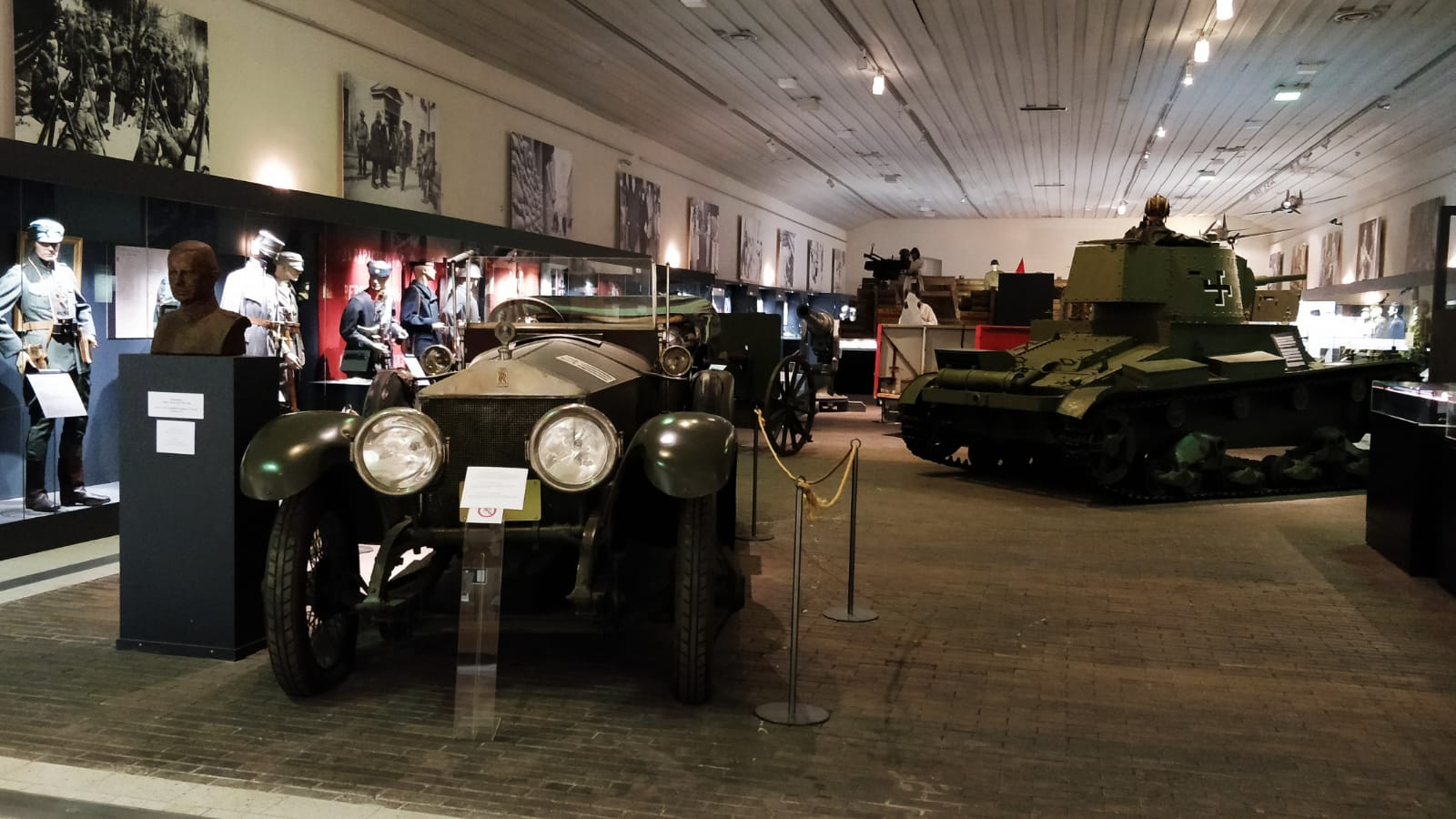
A view of the exhibition

The Manege Military Museum is a part of the museum housed in a former Russian arsenal built in 1880–1881. The Manege hosts exhibitions devoted to Finnish military history from the early 19th century to the present day, with an emphasis on the Finnish Defence Forces and World War II.

The Manege was opened to public June 1, 1989. The original exhibition consisted mainly of heavy weapons from Finnish wars against Soviet Union in 1939–1944. There have been arranged also special exhibitions, for example in 2003–2004 about Finnish submarines and in summer 2011 about the submarine Vesikko. The Manege's collections include e.g. a German 88mm Flak 37 Anti-Aircraft gun and British Vickers-Armstrong 38 light tank. Both have been used by the Finnish Army during the wars. One specialty in the exhibition is a torpedo tube from a Finnish S2- torpedo boat, sunk in 1925. In summer 2012 a new exhibition called From Autonomy to Atalanta was opened. The exhibition showcases Finnish military history from the 19th century to the present day. This exhibition was closed in October 2017.

Finnish Defence Forces – 100 years at the war and peace -exhibition was opened in 2018. The exhibition portrays the wars Finland has fought during its independence: the Civil was 1918, the Winter War in 1939–1940, the Continuation War in 1941–1944 and the Lapland War in 1944–1945. The exhibition continues in the adjacent building, telling the story of Finnish Defence Forces in the post-war period up to the present day

=== History of the Building ===
The Manege was built in 1880–1881, in a time when Finland was still part of the Russian Empire. Some architectural plans had been made already in 1875 but they were however rejected. Three years later architect Greifon's plan was considered the best alternative. The Manege was built using brick and floor was originally made of clay. Floor was re-constructed however in 1908 by using concrete as building material. Between the entrances on both ends of the building is a large hall. Originally there were heating ovens next to the entrances.

Russians used the building mainly as artillery storage but there was also a possibility for soldiers to train gymnastics in the main hall. In the beginning of 1890s places for an orchestra, a stage and dressing rooms for both women and men were built in the end of the main hall. The Manege was suitable for many different purposes, but despite its name it was neved used as a riding hall.

After Finland gained its independence in 1917 the command of Suomenlinna sea fortress transferred from Russia to Finland. Soon after becoming independent Finland fell into Civil War. During and after the Civil War, Suomenlinna sea fortress had camps for the red side's prisoners of war. However, during the war the Manege served as storage and workshop. After the Civil War the Manege has primarily served as storage facility for the Finnish Navy and from 1974 onwards for the Military Museum. Anyhow, the main hall has occasionally served as a movie theatre and during the Continuation War it was also used as a basketball court.

The Manege was chosen to become a museum after the Military Museum received a permission from the government to open exhibitions again in Suomenlinna in 1975. Many residents of the sea fortress were suspicious about this at first because they feared the Military Museum would use residential buildings as exhibition space. The residents also feared that the Naval Museum, which had been closed in 1963, would be re-established in Suomenlinna. This however never occurred and the renovation of the Manege was carried out in 1986–1987. During the renovation, the heating ovens were removed and the floor was reconstructed.

There have been several different exhibitions during the years in the Manege and the ongoing From Autonomy to Atalanta-exhibition covers Finnish military history from early 19th century until the present day. The Military Museum has also arranged special exhibitions in the Manege, for example the Submarine Vesikko-exhibition in the summer of 2011.

=== From Autonomy to Atalanta- exhibition ===
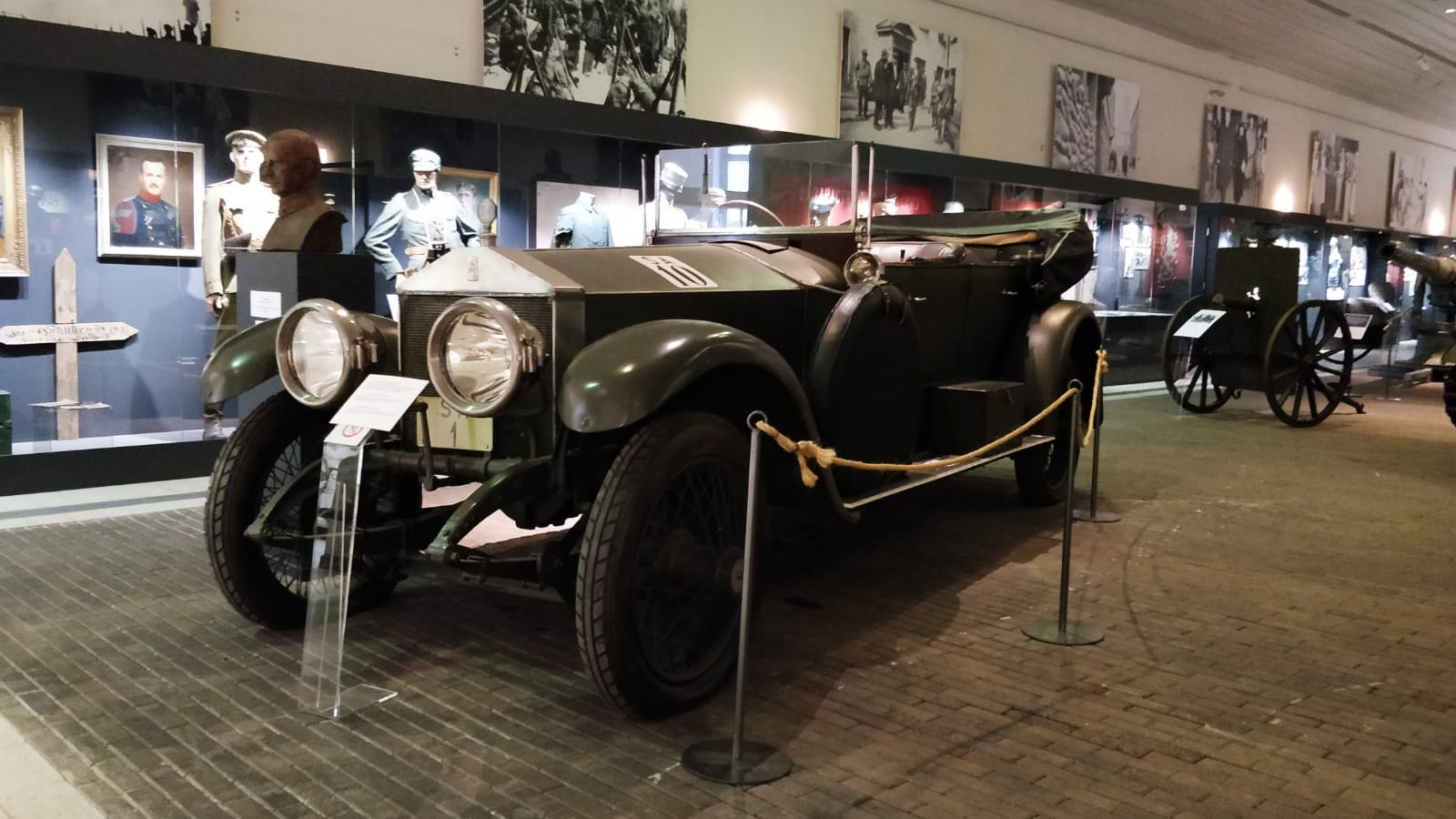
Rolls-Royce Silver Ghost

From Autonomy to Atalanta-exhibition is situated in the main hall of the Manege. The exhibition consists of three parts: on the left side (looking from the main door) of the main hall is information about the Finnish military history and the development of Finnish Defence Forces. Different kinds of military uniforms from the 1800s until modern times are showcased on the right side of the main hall. In the middle visitors can explore bigger artefacts, such as missiles and cannons.

During the years the content of exhibitions has varied. However, a signal dugout and British Vickers-Armstrong tank, which was used in Winter and Continuation Wars, have been a permanent part of the exhibitions in the Manege. The artefacts on display in From Autonomy to Atalanta- exhibition vary in branch: anti-aircraft defence is represented with an RMB anti-aircraft gun, field artillery with a 76K/02 cannon and Navy with a Soviet T-46 torpedo and a Somali pirate boat which was taken over by minelayer Pohjanmaa during the Atalanta-operation. The relevance of supply in warfare is demonstrated with a field kitchen unit moved by horses, as well as with an American Ford V8-truck.

One of the exhibition's rarities is the torpedo tube from a Finnish S2-torpedo boat. The tube has been in the bottom of the Baltic Sea twice. Originally the tube is from Imperial Russia's torpedo boat Bditelnyi, which sank after hitting a sea mine in November 1917. The tube was then lifted from the sea by the Finnish army and put to a S2-torpedo boat, belonging to the Finnish Navy. In October 1925 the S2-torpedo boat faced a heavy storm and sank near Reposaari. The tube was again lifted up in the next year and it became a part of the Military Museum's collection in 1930.

=== Finnish Defence Forces – 100 years at war and peace -exhibition ===
Finnish Defence Forces – 100 years at the war and peace -exhibition was opened in 2018. The exhibition portrays the wars Finland has fought during its independence: the Civil was 1918, the Winter War in 1939–1940, the Continuation War in 1941–1944 and the Lapland War in 1944–1945. The exhibition continues in the adjacent building, telling the story of Finnish Defence Forces in the post-war period up to the present day.

== Special military museums ==
At the moment there are eight special military museums in Finland, which operate under the Military Museum's supervision. Due to limited resources and lack of exhibition halls, historical military collections have been divided to special arms museums. Especially the growing amount of collections in different army units has resulted in the founding of specialized military museums. They are often financed by foundations and have been founded since 1945. Special military museums include The Tank Museum, The Anti-Aircraft Museum, The Finnish Air Force Museum, The Infantry Museum, The Museum of Military Medicine, Mobilia, Forum Marinum and Museum Militaria, which comprises the Engineers Museum, The National Signals Museum and The Artillery Museum of Finland.

== See also ==
- The Artillery Museum of Finland
- Parola Tank Museum
- The exhibition Finnish Defence Forces – 100 Years at War and Peace is accessible on the ThingLink service: https://www.thinglink.com/card/1483758551078797314 (War time), https://www.thinglink.com/card/1488839483951415299 (Post-war time)

== Notes ==
- Härö, Mikko; Enqvist, Ove (1998). Varuskunnasta maailmanperinnöksi – Suomenlinnan itsenäisyysajan vaiheet. Suomenlinna ry, Uudenkaupungin Sanomat Oy.
