= Salpa Line Museum =

Museum of military history in Finland

Salpalinja-museo The Salpa Line Museum Музей линии "Салпа"
- Established: 1987
- Location: Säästöpirtintie 70, Miehikkälä, Finland
- Coordinates: 60°39.043′N 27°41.566′E
- Type: A military history museum related to the engineer corps of Finland and the Continuation War
- Website: Official website

The Salpa Line Museum (Finnish: Salpalinja-museo, Russian: Музей линии "Салпа") was established and opened in 1987 by the municipality of Miehikkälä and by World War II veteran organisations. It is the first museum established in Miehikkälä. The other museums are the Miehikkälän kotiseutumuseo and the Miehikkälä local arts and crafts museum, which was established in 1989 and is located in the same building as the Engineers Museum.

The Salpa Line Museum is the core of the Salpa Centre, which is the tourist information centre of the Salpa Line Museum, the Engineers Museum and the Bunker Museum. The surrounding area was built as a defensive line for an infantry company in 1940–1944. The defensive line never saw active combat as the front line did not reach the area due to the truce of 5 September 1944 and the Moscow Armistice of 19 September 1944.

Some of the preserved Salpa Line areas are classified as built-up cultural environments of national importance by Finland's National Board of Antiquities. The territory of the Salpa Line Museum belongs to one of the four such areas in Miehikkälä: Kylmälä, Miehikkälä municipal center, Muurula and Myllylampi.

== Exhibits ==
Due to the nature of the museum, most collections are located outside in the woods. Some bunkers from World War II remain. There are several anti-tank guns outside the museum centre building.

| Object # | Military use | WGS 84 | Description |
|---|---|---|---|
| 321 | Anti-tank dugout, machine gun position and accommodation for a half infantry platoon, 20 soldiers | | |
| 322 | Accommodation dugout for a platoon, 40 soldiers | | "Economy model" |
| 385 | Artillery observation dugout, accommodation for 20 soldiers | | |
| 327 | Accommodation dugout for 20 soldiers | | |
| 326 | Machine gun dugout and accommodation for 20 soldiers | | |
| 360 | 7.5 cm Panzerabwehrkanone 40 | | Open, restored 75 mm anti-tank gun position |

== Gallery ==
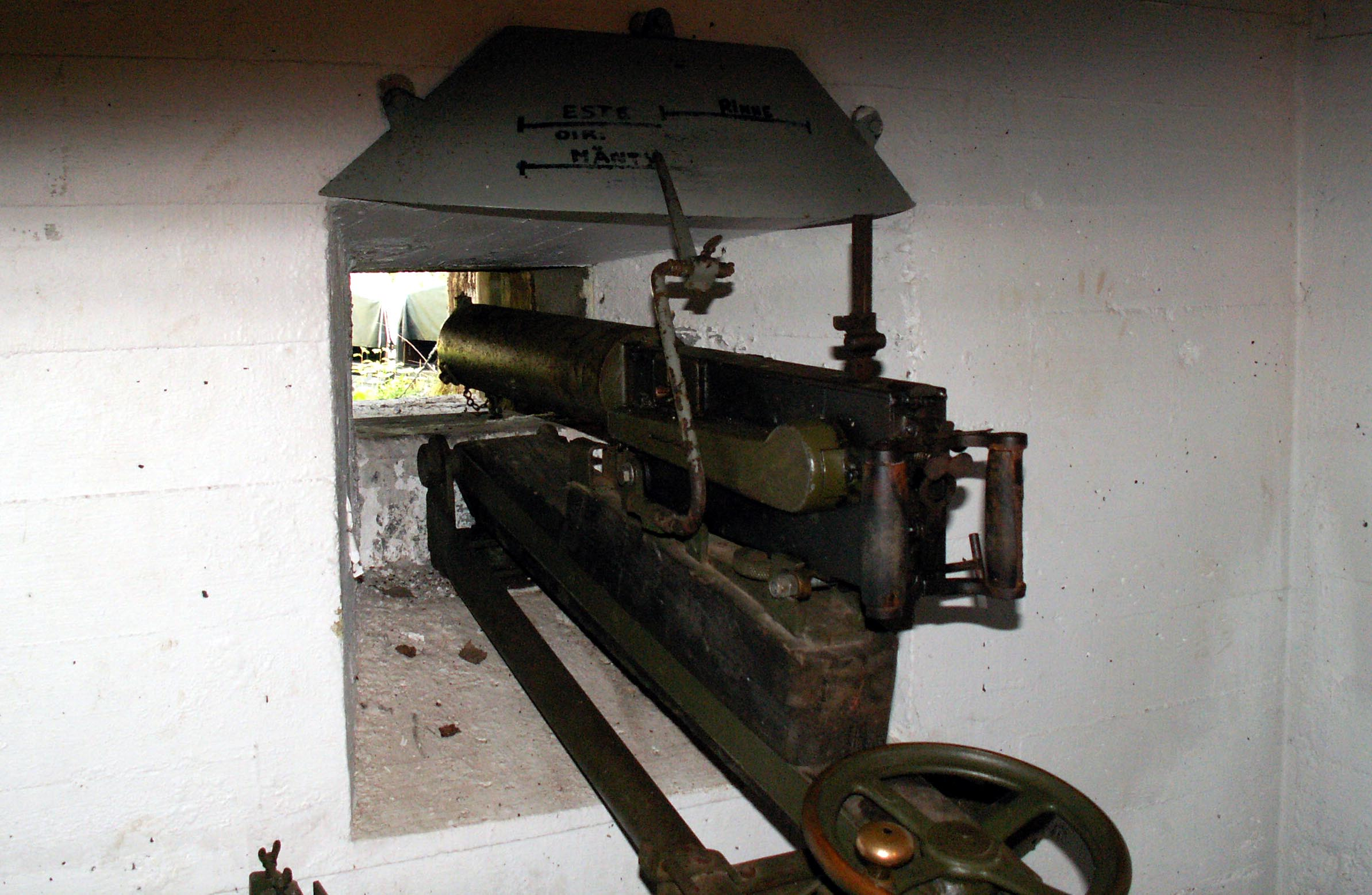
A machine gun bunker in the Salpa Line Museum

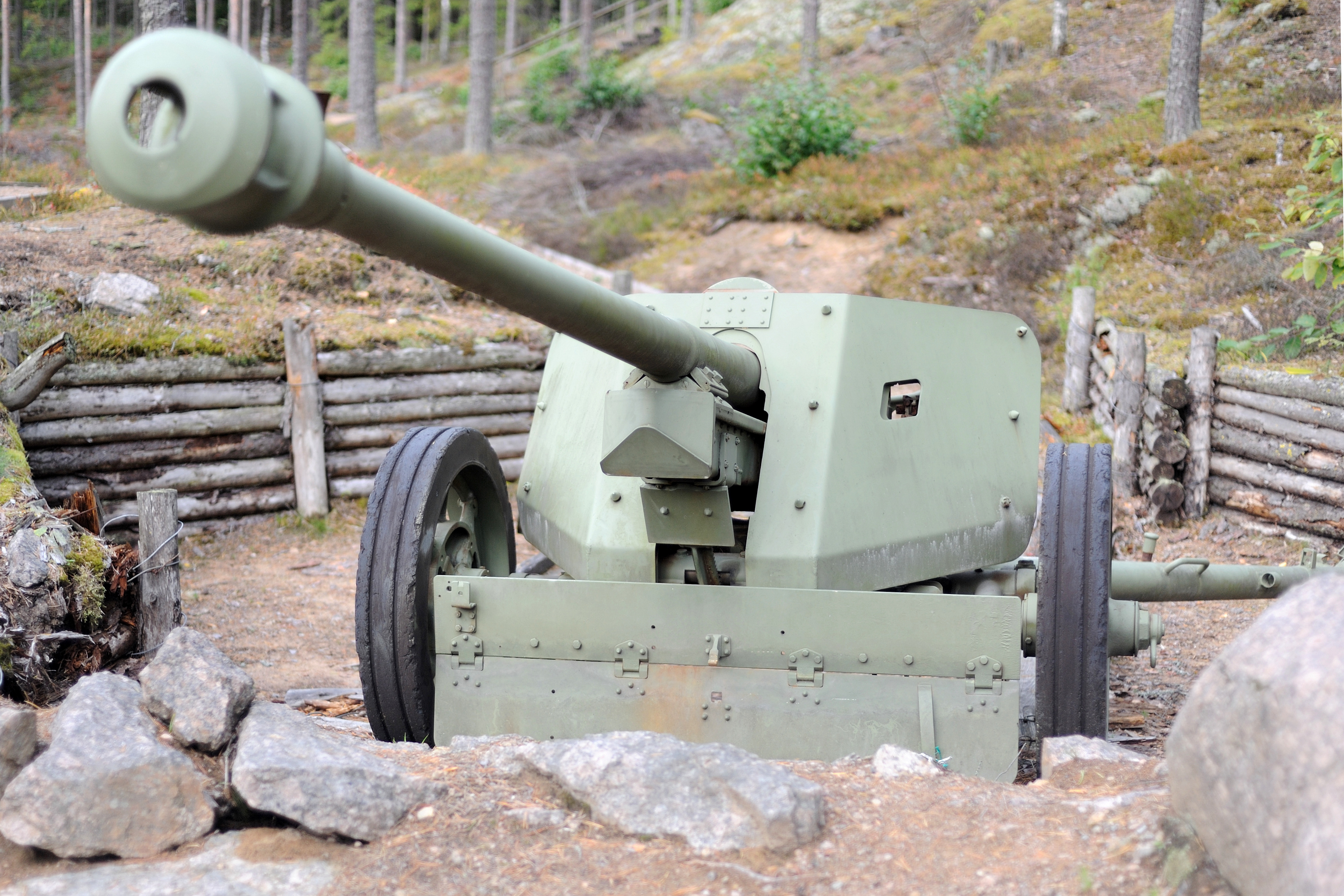
7.5 cm Panzerabwehrkanone 40 in the Salpa Line Museum
