= Korvensuu (car) =

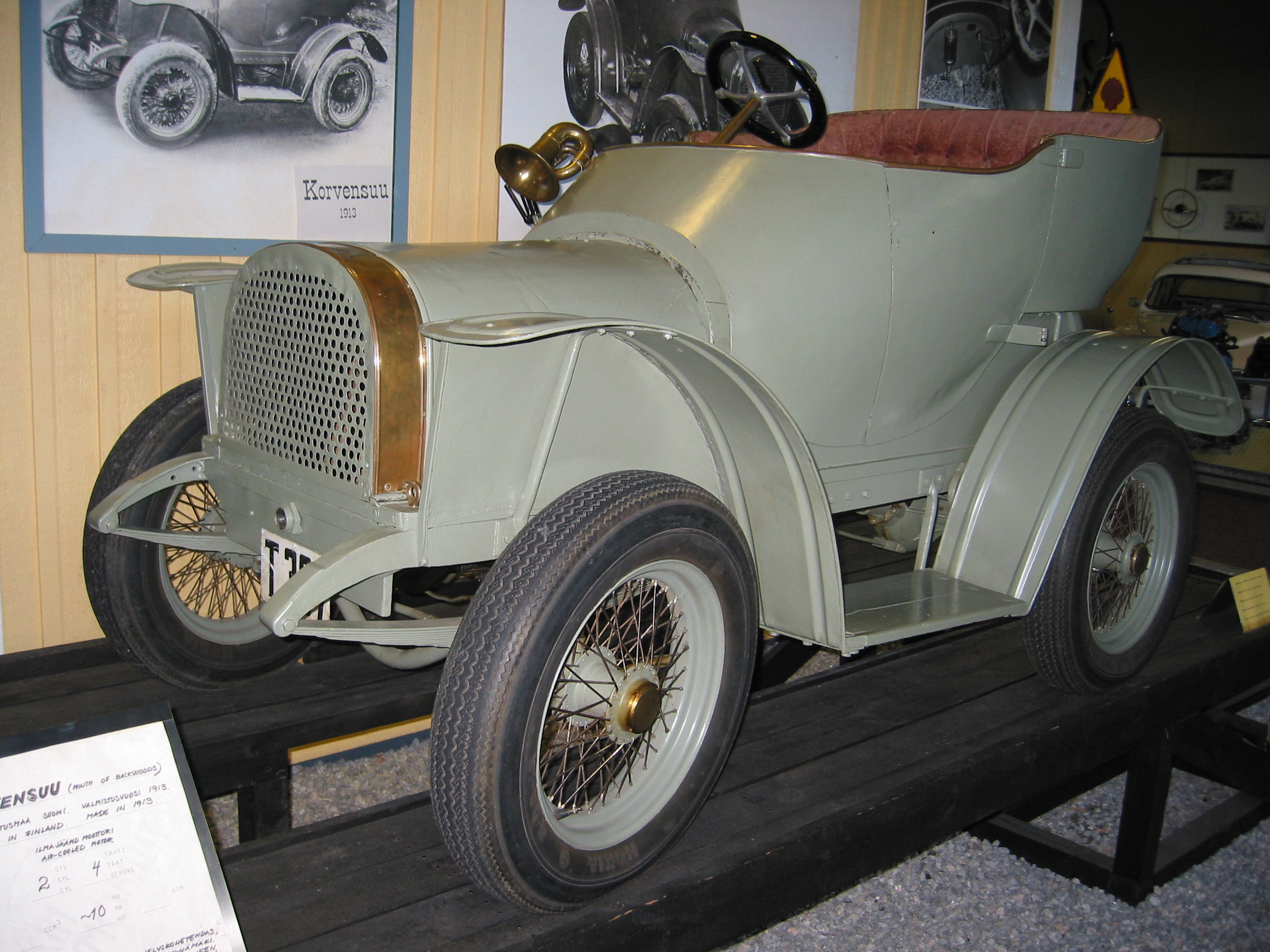
Korvensuu car 1913

Korvensuu was the name of a car constructed in Finland by Frans Lindström, owner of a small machine factory. The car was not intended for production, but rather as an example of his company’s abilities. Design and construction was done during the years 1912-1913 (the name Korvensuu was given after the factory). Most of the car parts were locally built. The engine is a 10hp air-cooled four-stroke inline 2-cylinder. The exhaust valves are side-valves and inlet valves are of atmospheric type, not connected to camshaft.

The car was displayed in a museum in Mynämäki. Since 2008 the car is displayed in the Automobile Museum in Uusikaupunki.
