= Uusikaupunki Automobile Museum =

- Finnish: Uudenkaupungin automuseo Swedish: Nystads bilmuseum
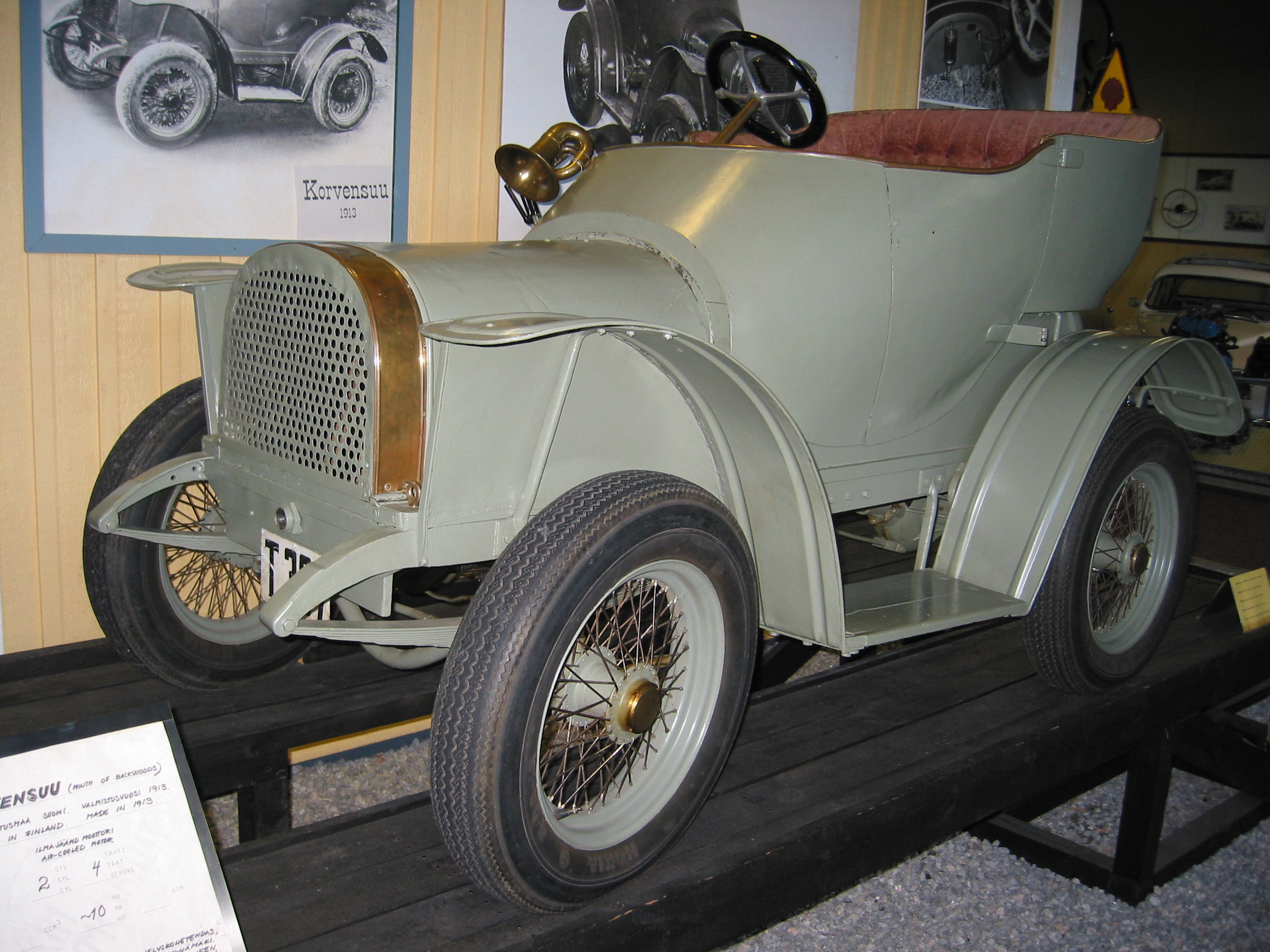
- The 1913 Korvensuu at the museum
- Established: February 1984; 42 years ago
- Location: Uusikaupunki, Finland
- Coordinates: 60.809134°N 21.450289°E
- Type: Automobile museum

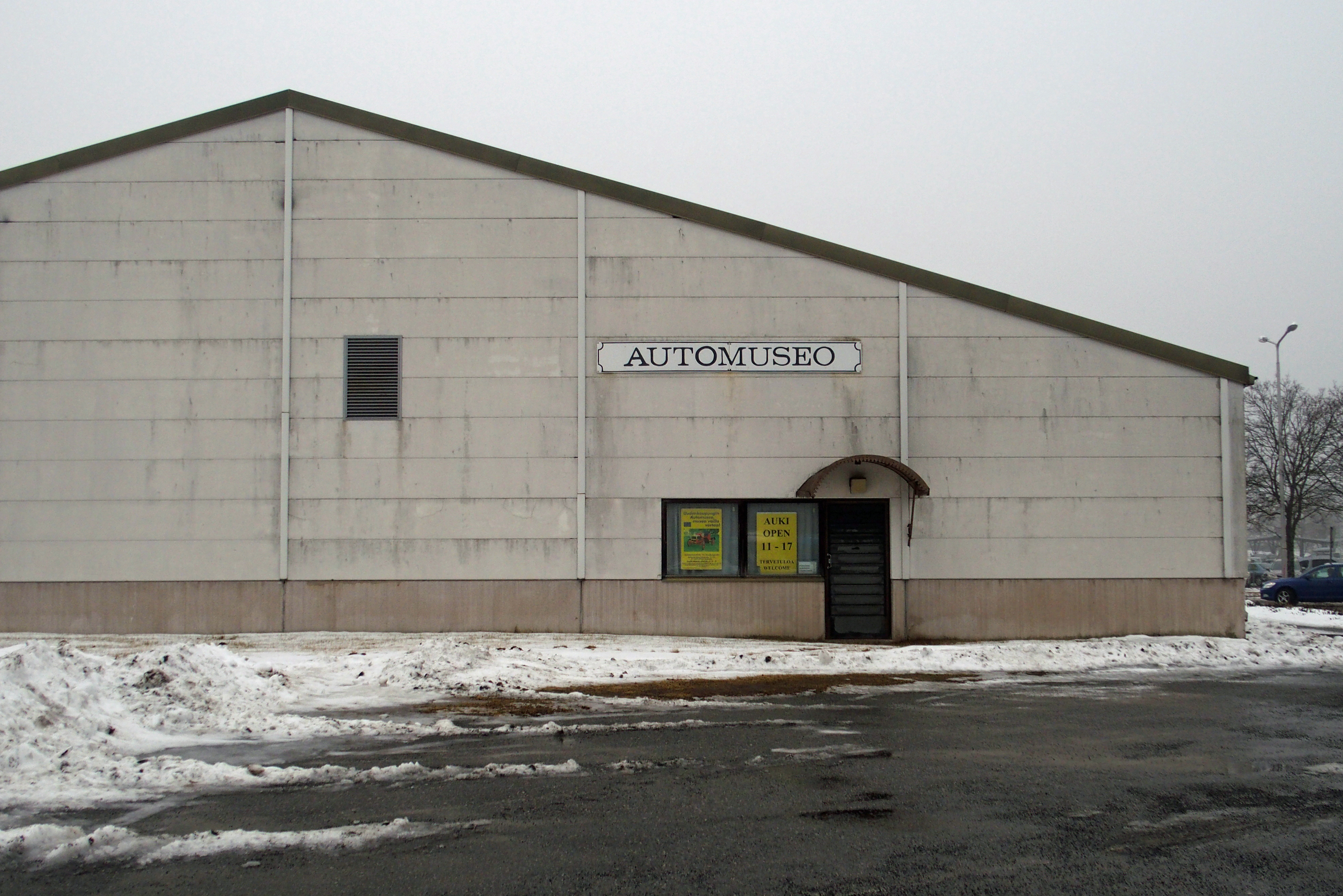
A museum building in Uusikaupunki

Uusikaupunki Automobile Museum (Finnish: Uudenkaupungin automuseo; Swedish: Nystads bilmuseum) is a vehicle museum located next to the Valmet Automotive factory in Uusikaupunki, Southwest Finland. Its collections include about a hundred cars, a selection of mopeds, a few motorcycles and even two airplanes. The museum has three exhibition halls and is open all year round.

The car museum exhibits, among other things, the first car built in Finland, the Korvensuu. The museum has its own section on the history of Saab cars, which are closely related to the history of the Valmet car factory. In connection with the museum, there is a restoration workshop for the maintenance, restoration and upholstery of vintage cars.

== History ==
The initiative to establish a car museum in Uusikaupunki was made in 1982 by Juhani Linnoinen, the then CEO of Oy Saab-Valmet Ab (today Valmet Automotive), justifying the matter by Uusikaupunki's status as an "automotive industry city". The Uusikaupunki car factory promised to rent part of its area for the car museum. The Uusikaupunki town council made a decision to establish the museum in January 1983, and the museum was opened to the public at the beginning of February 1984.

== See also ==
- List of automotive museums
- Mobilia
