= Finland's Motorcycle Museum =

Transportation museum in Finland

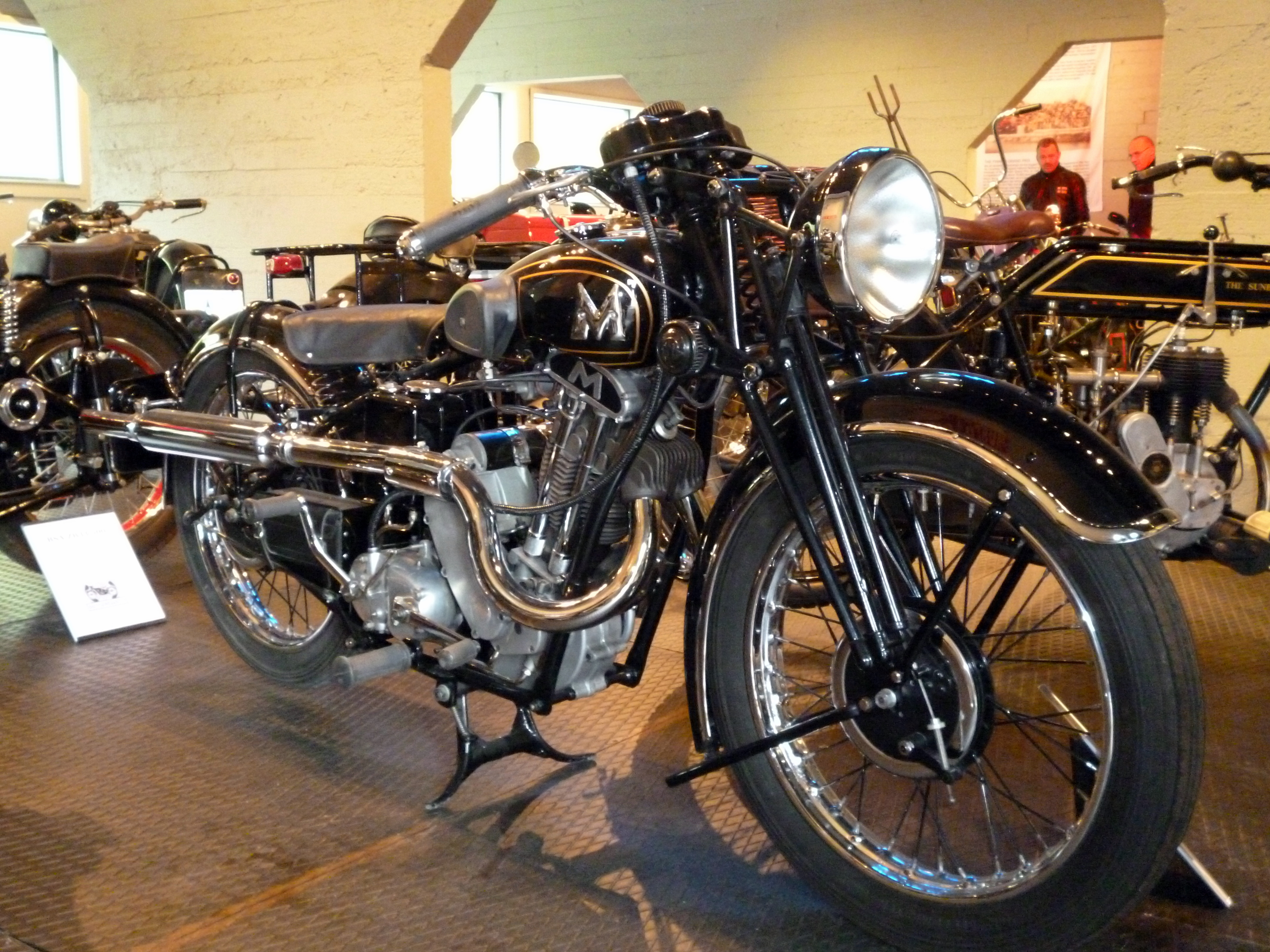
- Matchless Model 35/D80 (1935) at the Finnish Motorcycle Museum in Lahti.
- Established: 2011
- Location: Veistämönkatu 1B; 15140 Lahti; Finland
- Coordinates: 61°00′31″N 25°38′59″E
- Type: Transport museum
- Website: Motorcycle Museum

Finland's Motorcycle Museum (Finnish: Suomen moottoripyörämuseo) is a museum located in Lahti, Finland. It is the only museum in Finland specializing on motorcycles. Especially the museum has on display restored world-famous motorcycles, national racebikes and mopeds. The motorcycle museum's collection includes over 100 motorcycles and historical items related to motorcycling. It also has yearly changing themes. Finland's Motorcycle Museum was founded and is being owned by a local entrepreneur Riku Routo.

In the same building with the museum is also Ace Cafe Lahti restaurant, popular destination among motorcyclists. Finland's Motorcycle Museum and Ace Cafe is a popular attraction in Lahti. It was chosen the most popular attraction in Lahti both in 2016 and 2017 by TripAdvisor. The museum has also been visited by international stars, such as Ewan McGregor, Charley Boorman and Dave Evans.

== See also ==
- List of motorcycle museums
- Mobilia
