= The Artillery Museum of Finland =

Military museum in Hämeenlinna, Finland

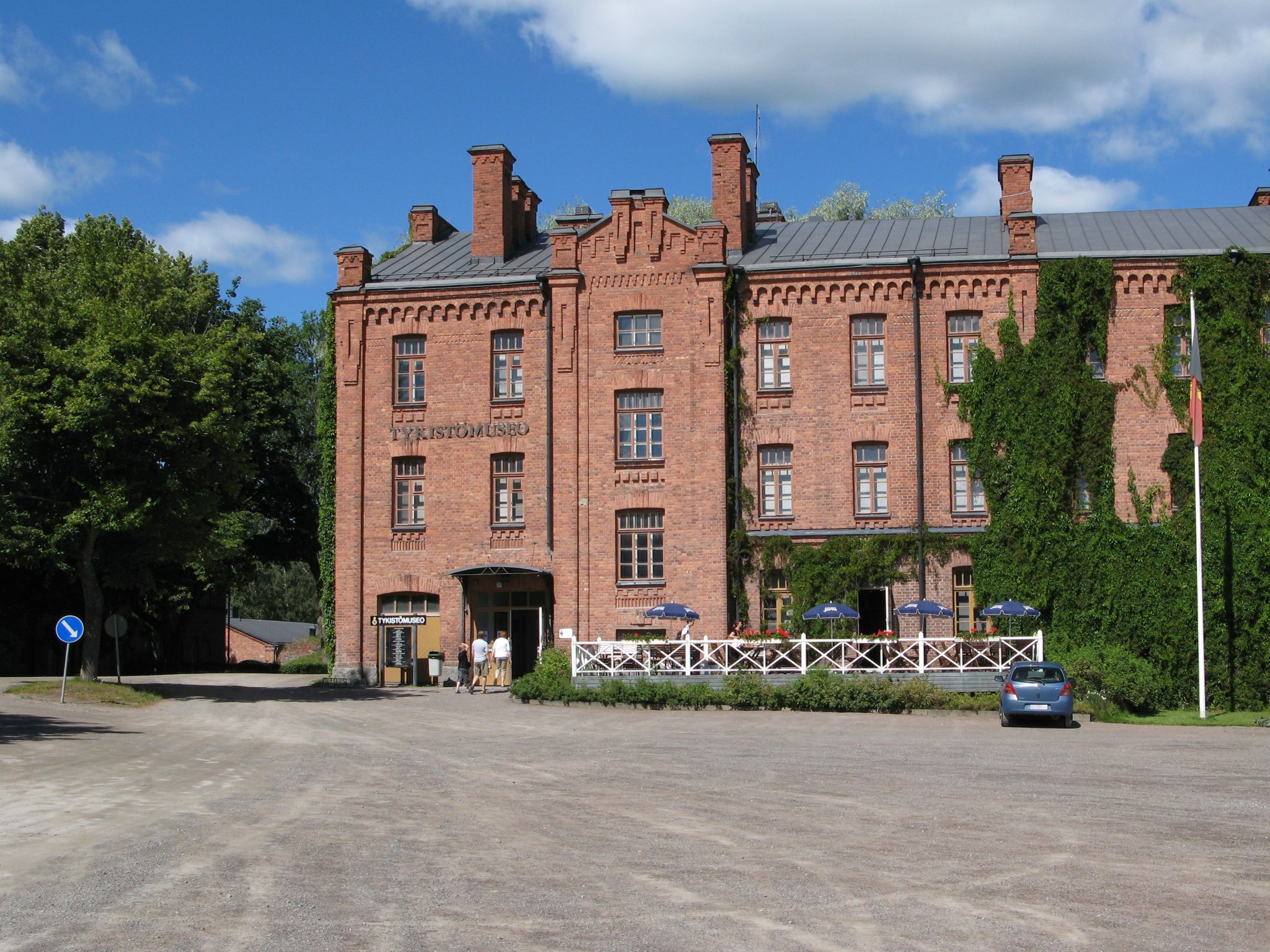
- Established: 1977
- Location: Hämeenlinna Finland
- Coordinates: 61°0′19″N 24°27′21″E
- Type: Military History
- Director: Mikko Kero
- Website: www.tykistomuseo.fi

The Artillery Museum of Finland (Suomen Tykistömuseo in Finnish) is a special military museum dedicated to the history of the artillery from the 15th century to the present day. It was located in Niinisalo from 1977 to 1997. In 1997 it was relocated to Hämeenlinna.

== History ==
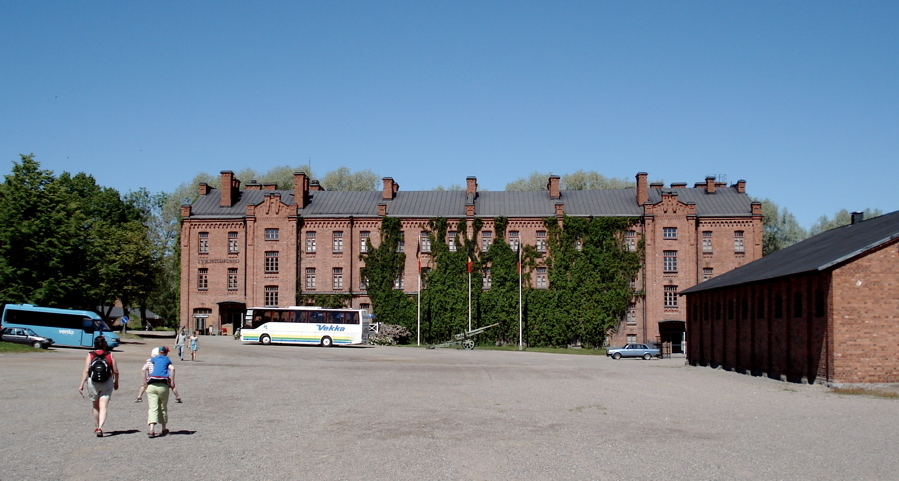
The exhibition building of the museum

A museum dedicated to the field artillery was discussed in Finland already in the 1930s but the Second World War put an end to that discussion. The idea was revived again in the beginning of the 1970s. A possibility of establishing the museum seemed feasible but the location was problematic. Proximity of some large artillery garrison was considered best for the museum.

In the heart of Satakunta, in Niinisalo, a suitable building was found. An empty school of Saloharju was rented to Tykkimiehet Association by the borough of Kankaanpää. The large artillery garrison of Niinisalo was placed quite near. The museum was founded on 2 July 1977 in Niinisalo under the name Artillery Museum (Tykistömuseo in Finnish). The great public did not, however, quite find its way to the museum, probably because of its remoteness. The decision to move the museum to a more central location was made in 1995.

A campaign for finding a new location was launched. Linnankasarmi at Hämeenlinna, with its vacant barracks, begun to feel attractive. The new Artillery Museum was opened there to the public on 12 May 1997.

The name of the museum was changed 1 January 2004 to The Artillery Museum of Finland (Suomen Tykistömuseo in Finnish).

A farewell party for the Artillery Museum of Finland was organized 4 December 2012 at the museum's Gun Hall. Starting from the beginning of 2013 the Artillery Museum of Finland's premises in Hämeenlinna's Linnankasarmi site were taken over by the new Museo Militaria, a military history museum created by joining the Artillery Museum of Finland, the Pioneerimuseo museum of Engineer Corps (of Finland) and the Viestimuseo museum of Signal Corps (of Finland).

== Location ==
The Artillery Museum of Finland is located at Hämeenlinna in the Linnakasarmi area. The buildings of Linnankasarmi date back to the Russian regime, to the Autonomy 1809–1917. The construction of the barracks started in 1850 and was completed in 1913. The archaeological committee values Linnankasarmi quite highly as a traditional military area and prehistoric site because the medieval town of Hämeenlinna has once been here and its remains are still under the barrack yard. Moreover, Häme Castle is right next door and its century's long tradition includes also artillery.

In the museum there is also a cafeteria.

== Permanent exhibition ==
The permanent exhibition displays in three floors the history of artillery in Finland and the military history on the nation.

=== First floor ===
On the ground floor of the main building the birth of our artillery centuries ago is on display. The story proceeds from the War of Finland 1808-1809 through the period of Autonomy to the Finnish Civil War and to the Jäger Movement. A muzzleloader called Helvig, a cannon dating back to the War of Finland 1808-1809 is one of the guns worth mentioning. On the center passage of each floor there are projectiles from different periods and different guns.

=== Second floor ===
The second floor brings the visitor to the times of the winter and Continuation Wars. The firing methods of the field artillery and of the subjects connected, demonstrate the high technical know-how of the Finnish artillery. The study of the Artillery General Vilho Nenonen is also in this floor. The proto type of the Nenon – camera is on display in this room. The floor of the artillery veterans ends with the present time and with its objects. Special branches, such as artillery intelligence, communications and survey activities are placed on this floor. On display is also the uniform of Väinö Myllyrinne, the largest Finnish soldier ever at 226 centimeters some 7 foot and 5 inches tall.

=== Third floor ===
The third floor displays the life of the Marshal of Finland Gustaf Mannerheim, and for example the honorary gun, a Finnish 105 H 37 light howitzer on which gun carriage Mannerheim was escorted to the eternal rest in the winter 1951 is on display. Also is shown the life in the Finnish army after the Second World War and the technological development of artillery is also given special consideration.

== Gun hall ==
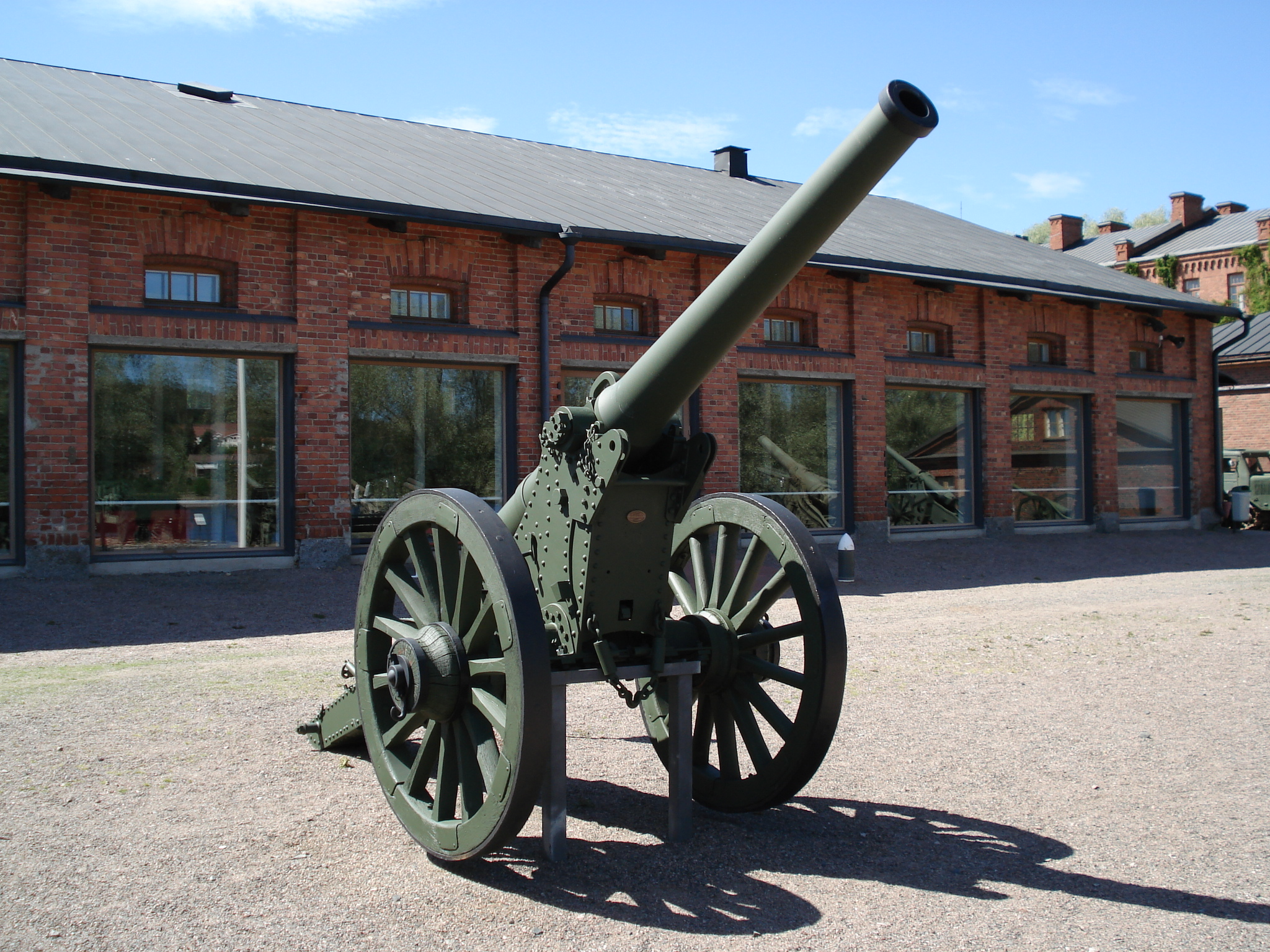
120 K 78-16 in front of the gun hall.

The gun collection of the museum is unique, the most comprehensive in the Scandinavia. As far as it is known there is no other museum outside Russia with a collection on Russian and Soviet artillery equipment as exhaustive as this. The amount of the pieces in the museum is now 90 different cannons plus heavy grenade launchers and rocket launchers. In the gun hall are located the rarest guns in the museum.

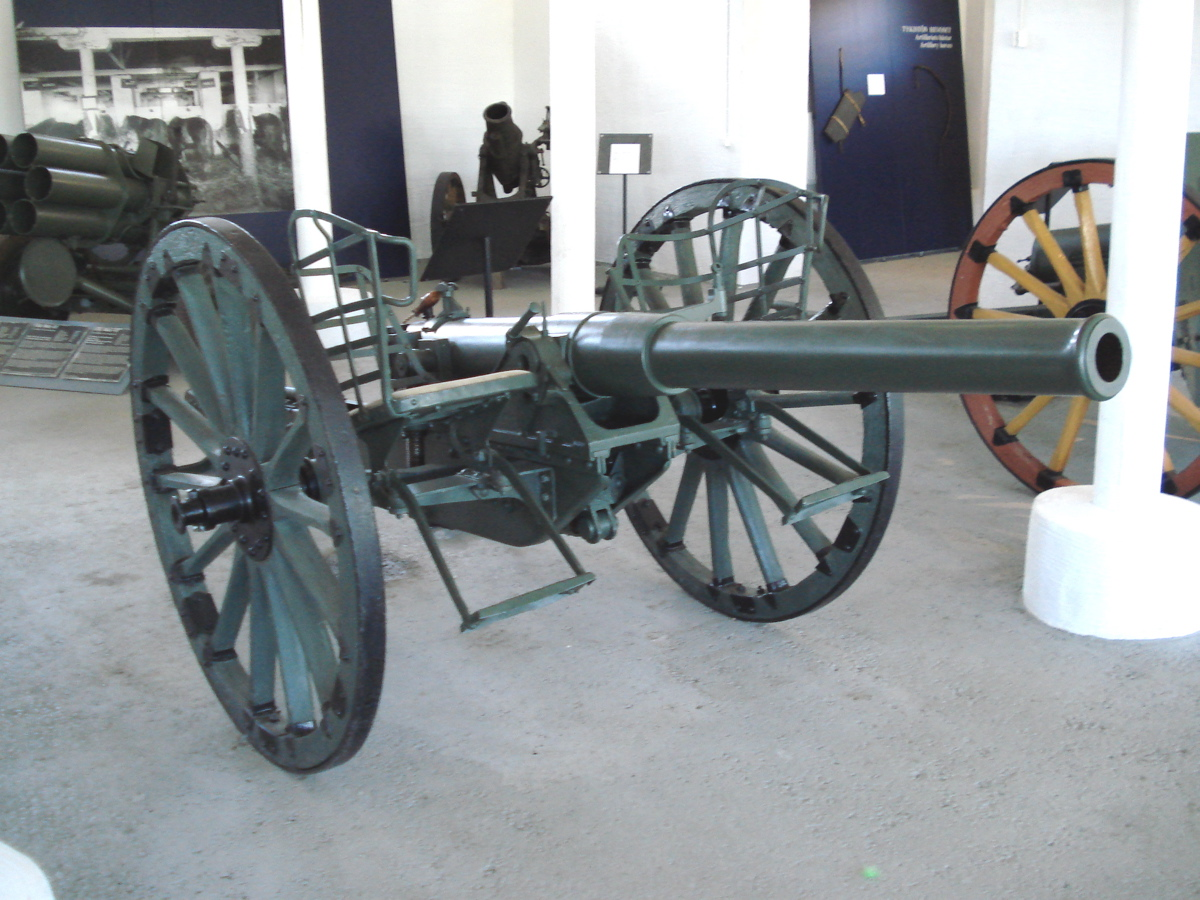
Russian gun 76 K/00 on display in the gun hall.

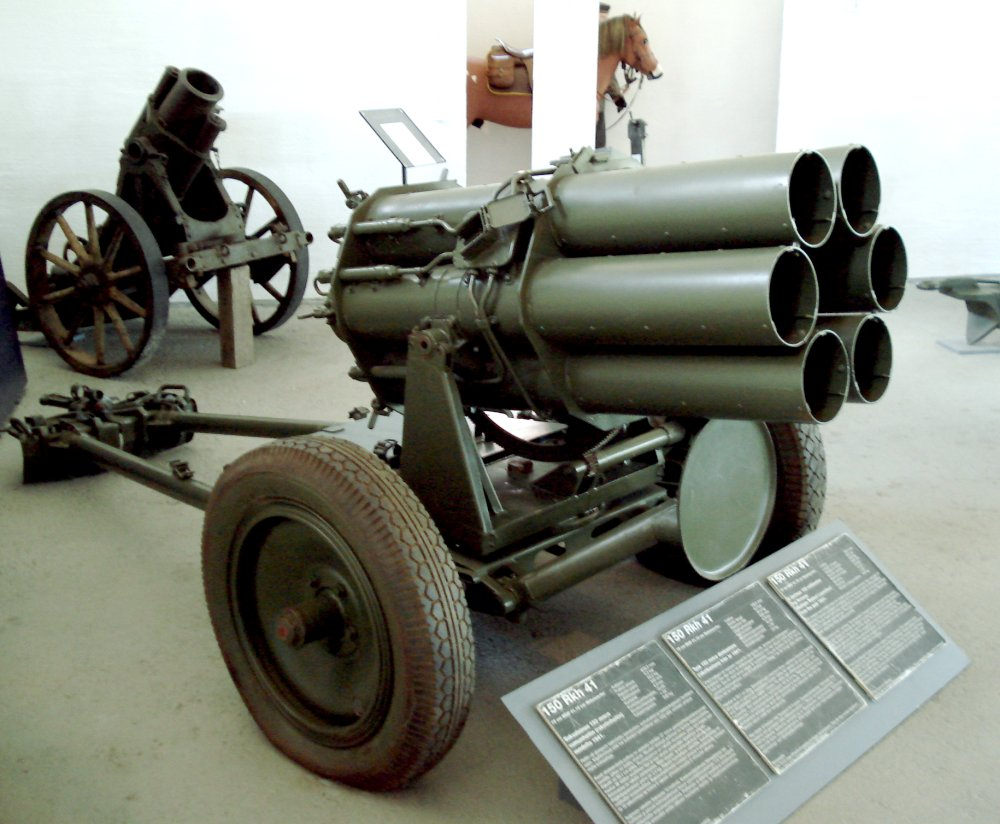
German Nebelwerfer rocketlauncher.

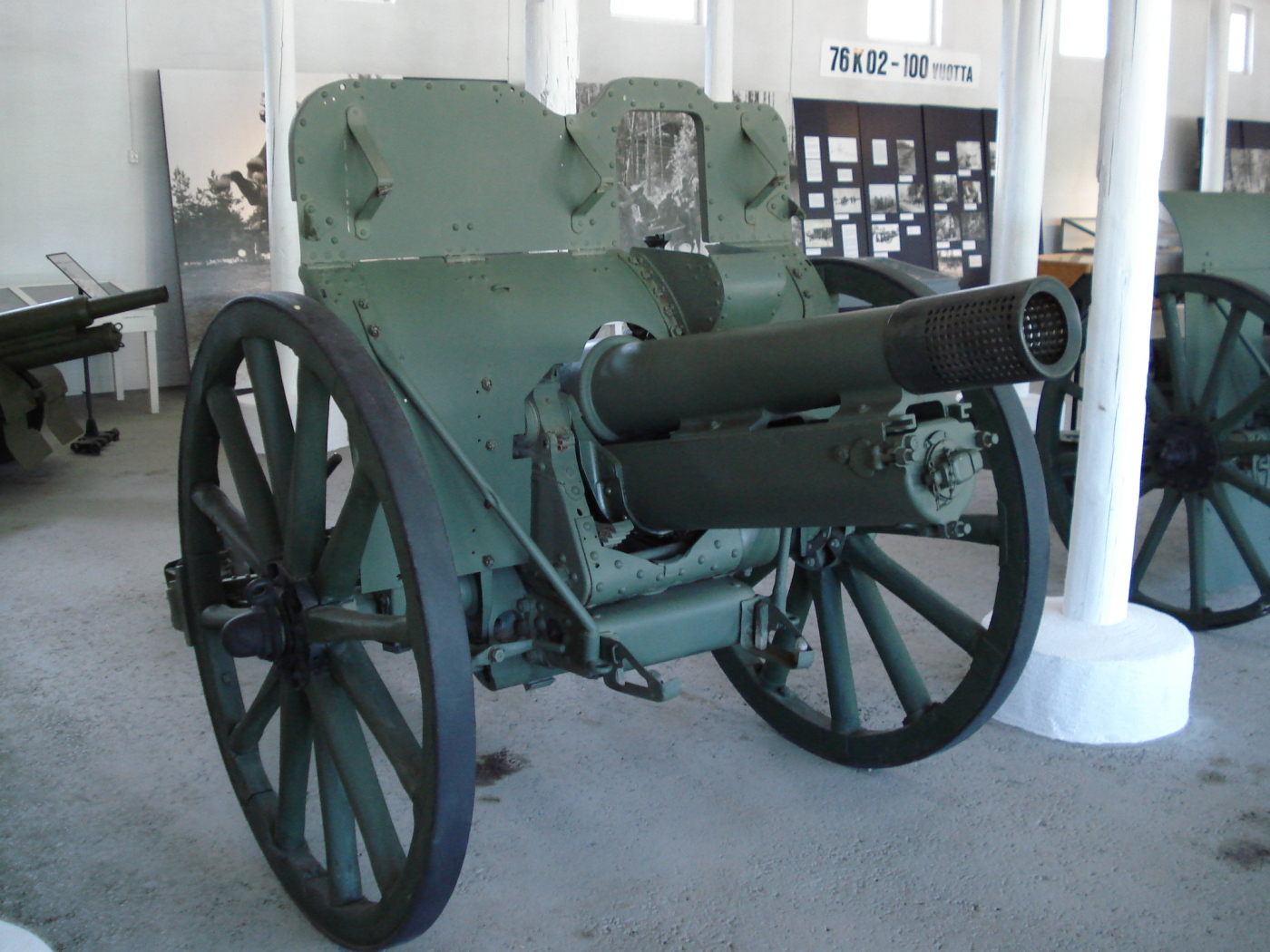
British 114 mm 4.5 inch Mk2 howitzer

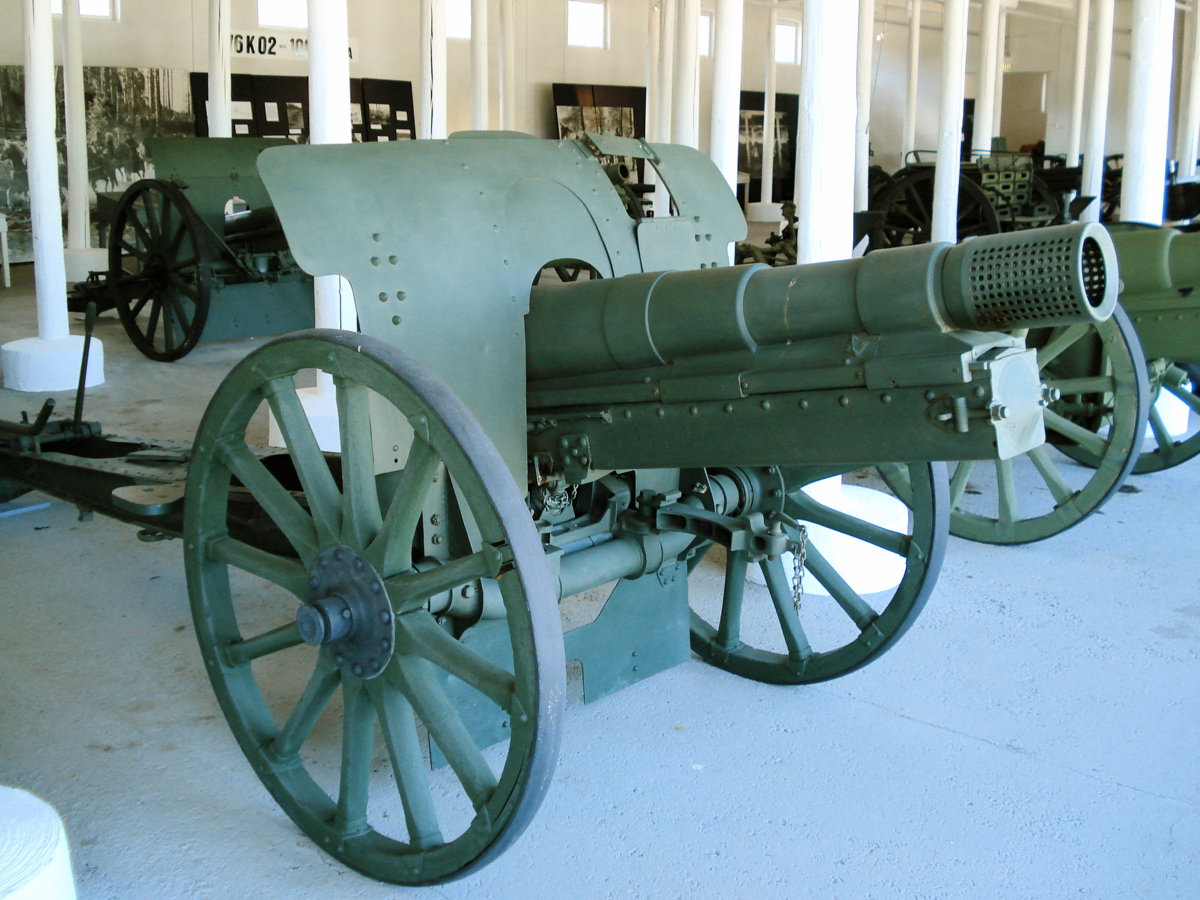
Soviet 122 mm howitzer model 09 H 37

== Gun yard ==
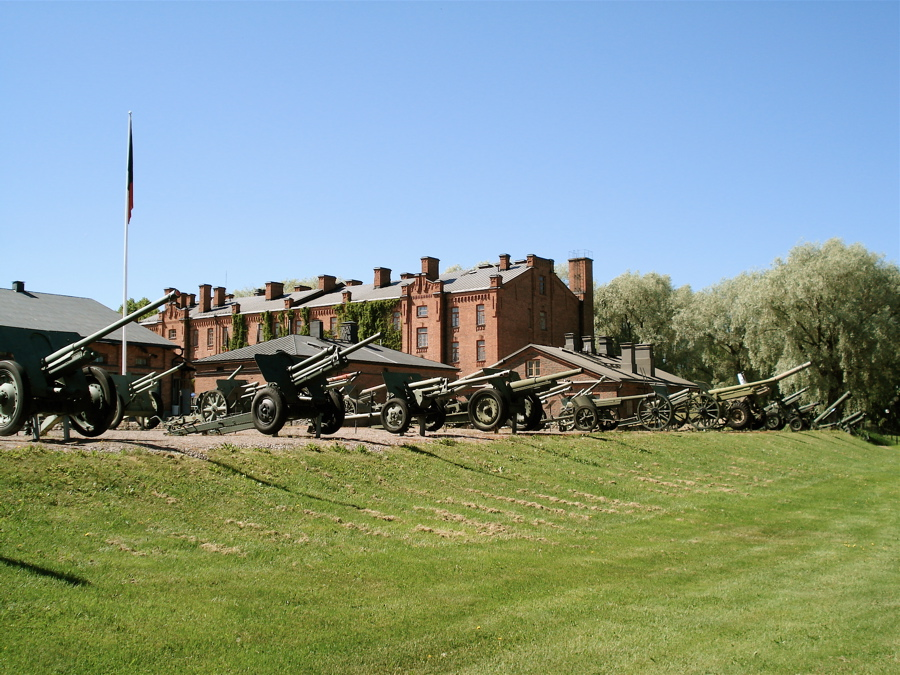
Some of the guns that are located in the gun yard.

The majority of guns in the museum are located at the gun yard. On the honorary place in the gun yard, with the flag of the Artillery Museum as a color guard, there is the funeral gun of the Artillery General, Mannerheim Cross Knight Vilho Nenonen, a Finnish 105 H 37 light howitzer.

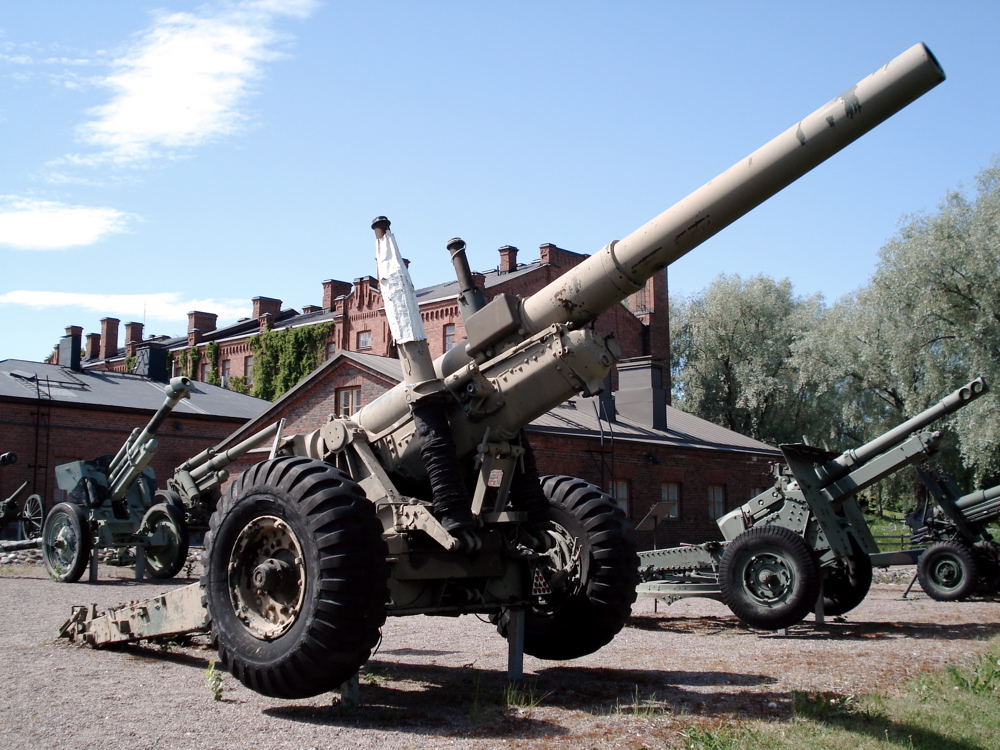
English gun 140 KH 39 E

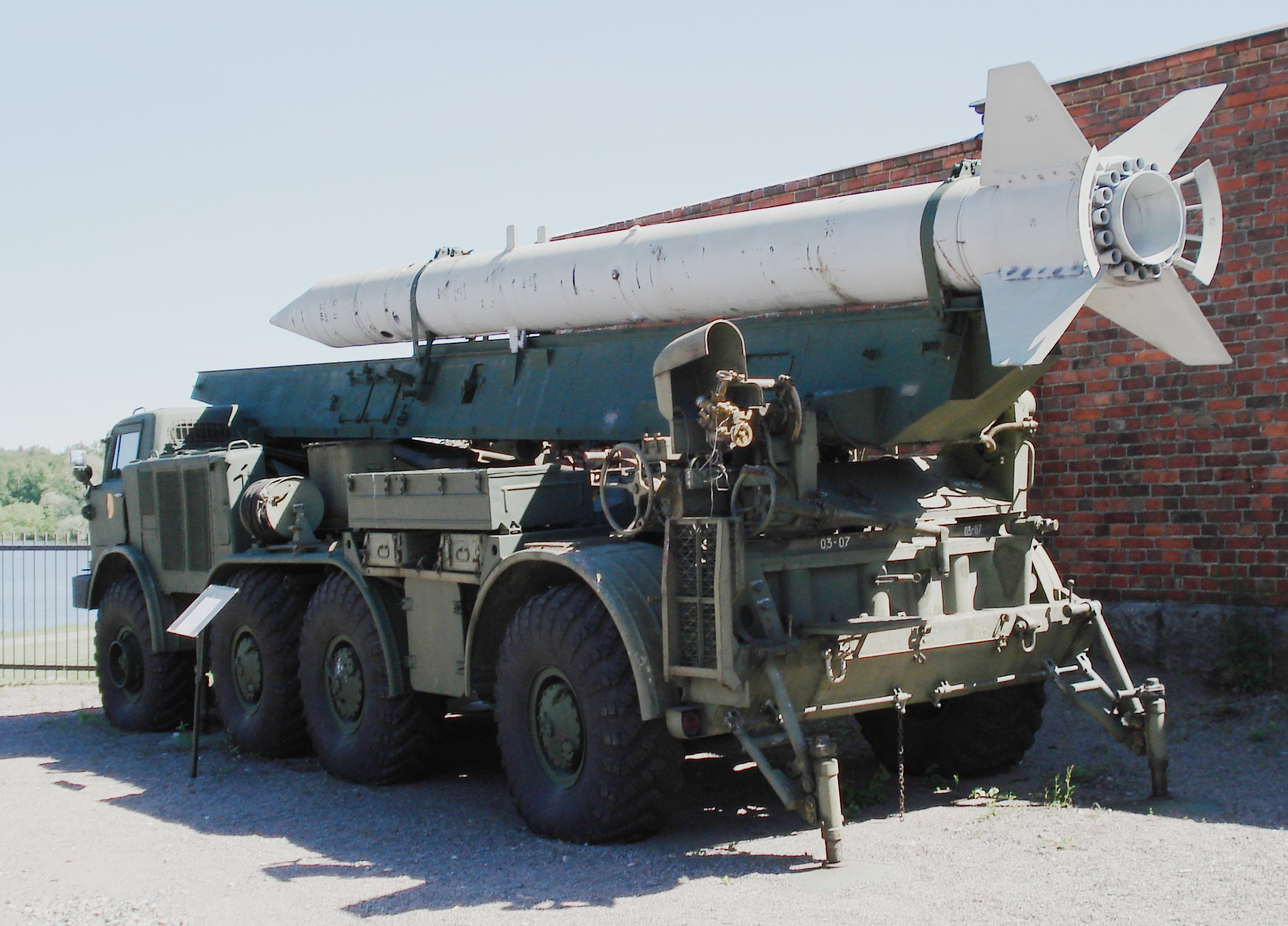
Soviet Luna-M rocket

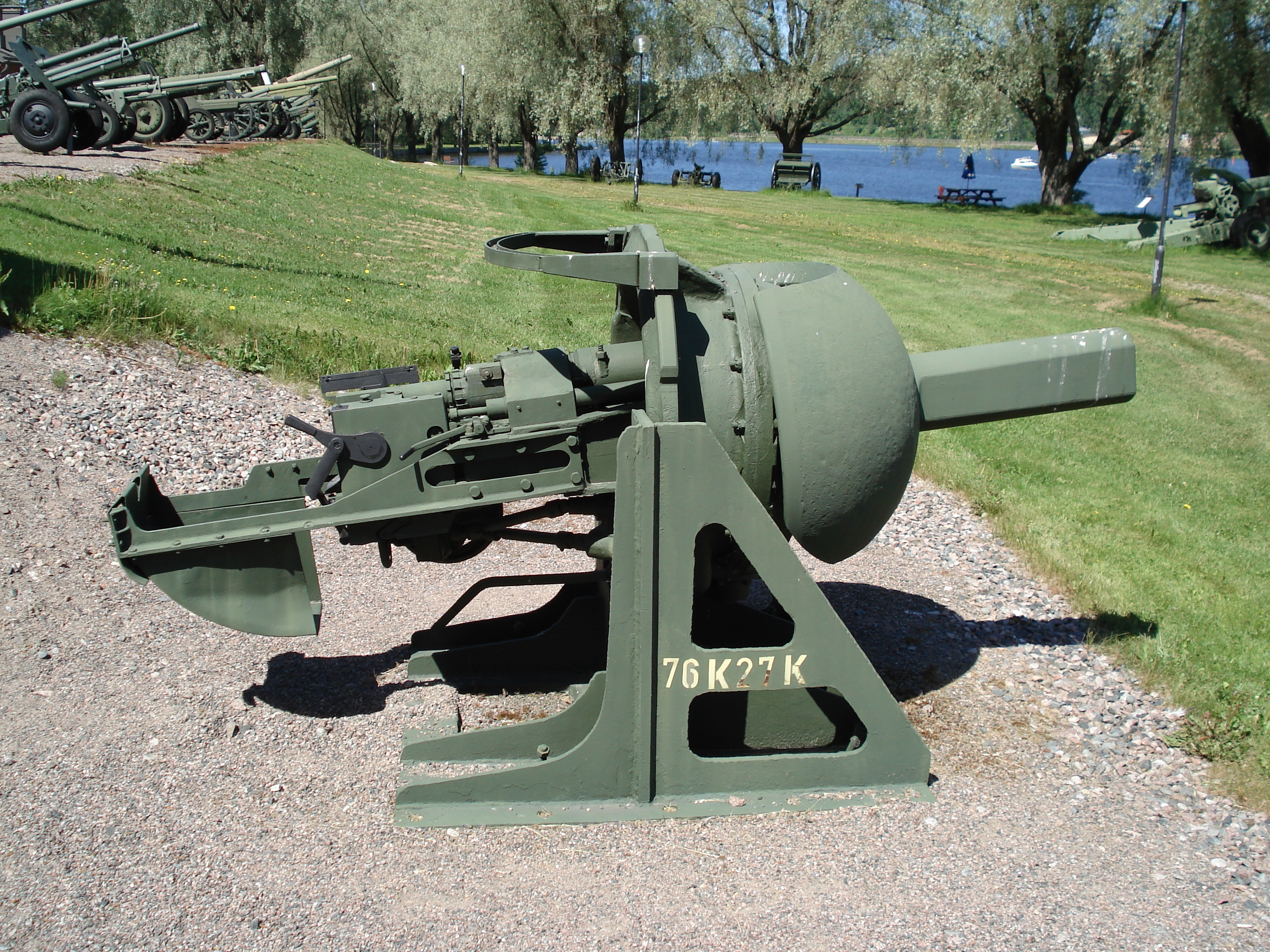
Russian 76 mm bunker gun model 76K27

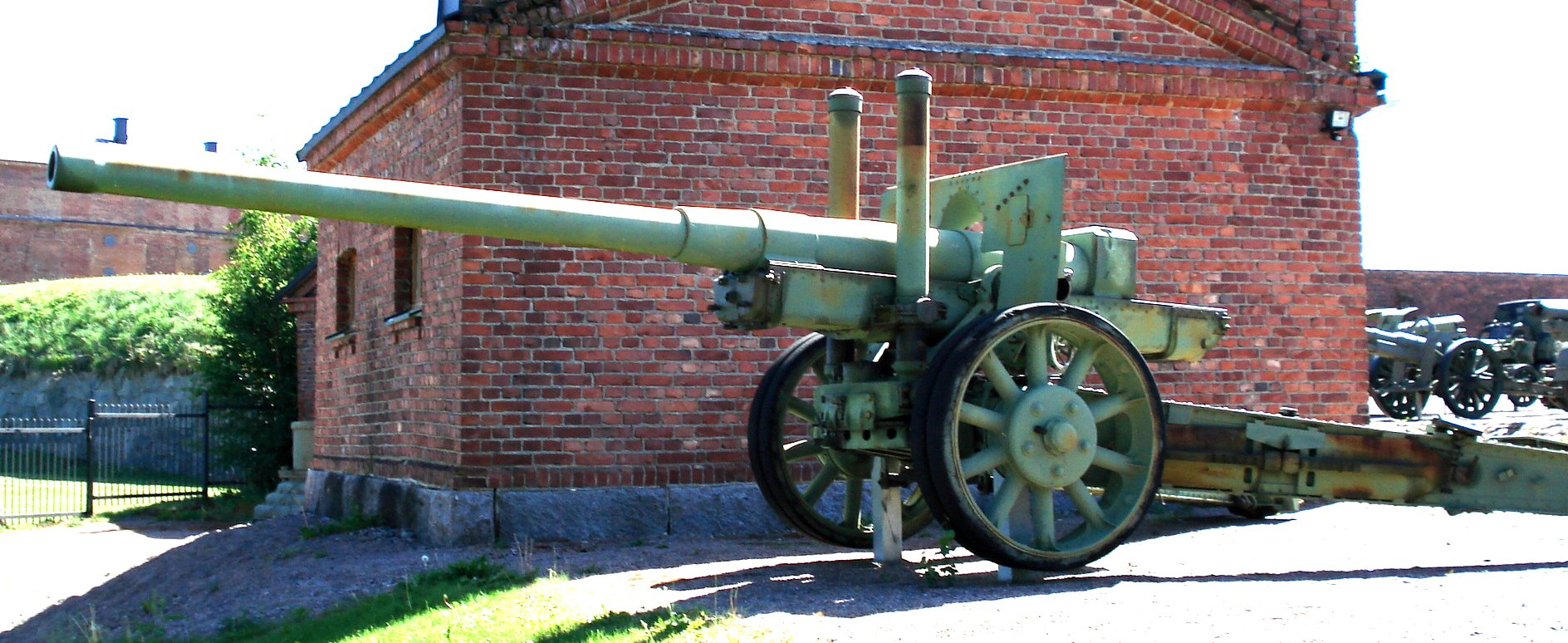
Soviet 122 mm howitzer model 122 K 31

== Special exhibitions ==
A new special exhibition "Artillery themed tin toys" opened in April 2010.

== Auditorium ==
In the auditoriums are shown the multimedia video films: "The miracle of Ihantala", based on the defensive victory in the summer 1944 on the Karelian Isthmus "Victory in wilderness", which is about the successful counter-attack in the wilderness of Ilomantsi in the summer 1944 "The last battle in Ladoga Karelia", the third film is also of the battles in the summer 1944, this time in Ladoga Karelia. The Russo-Finnish Winter War of 1939-1940", the first defensive victory The road to continuation war in 1940-1941, how Finland ended up allying itself with Germany against Russia.

The museum has also an interactive system "The artillery system of Finland in different times" on computers, which illustrates us the development of artillery from the 13th century to the present times.

== See also ==
- Military Museum of Finland
- Parola Tank Museum

== Other Artillery museums ==
- Firepower: The Royal Artillery Museum
- Military Historical Museum of Artillery, Engineers and Signal Corps
