= Mobilia =

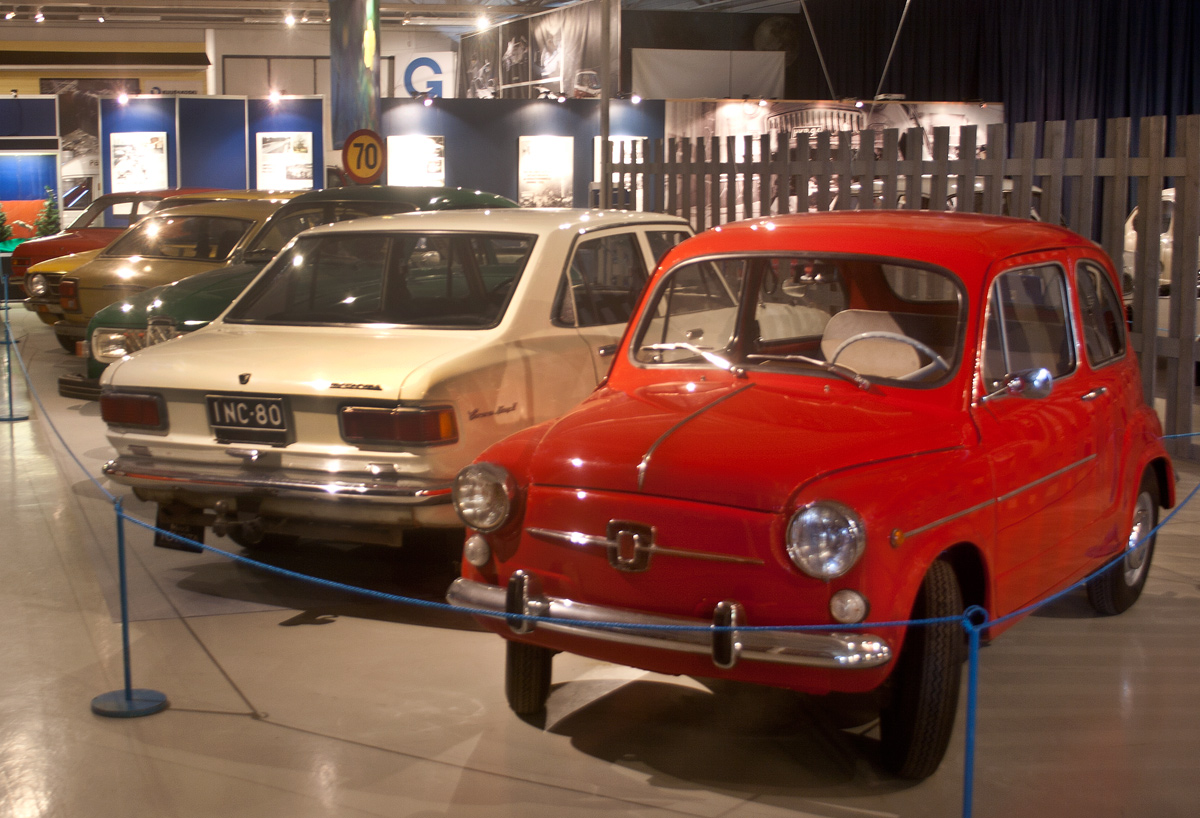
- Location: Kangasala, Finland
- Coordinates: 61.440977°N 24.130046°E
- Type: Automobile and road museum
- Director: Heidi Rytky
- Website: www.mobilia.fi/en

The Finnish Museum of Car and Road Mobilia is the national museum responsible for its special field, roads, and road traffic. The museum is situated by lake Längelmävesi in Kangasala, Finland, about half an hour drive from the city of Tampere. The museum is open to visitors all year around. There is also a cafeteria, a museum shop and playground and beach facilities for children.

Mobilia’s exhibitions include a permanent exhibition on the construction and use of Finnish roads, the Rally Museum, an outdoors exhibition on the use of emergency labor for road construction, an annually changing main exhibition on aspects of everyday road traffic, and a classic car gallery exhibiting various mostly privately owned cars.

The museum also offers various services for car owners, like conservation, maintenance, and storage. Museum clients can also acquire collections services including storage, cataloging, research, and consulting. Mobilia offers also professional consulting services to the Finnish Traffic Agency on their historical collections housed in Mobilia and traffic related historical landmarks owned by the Agency. The director of the museum is Heidi Rytky (since 2012) and previous directors were Kimmo Levä (1994-2011) and Martti Piltz (1992-1994).

== History ==
Mobilia foundation began in 1991 as a merger between the Road Museum, founded in 1980 by the Finnish roads and waterways administration, and Vehoniemi car museum foundation, founded by Kangasala-based entrepreneur Olavi Sallinen in 1986. The founding members also included the Motor Vehicles Registration Center, Kangasala municipality, the Finnish Defence Ministry, and the Finnish Road Administration. The new museum was opened to public in 1992. Today the Mobilia foundation has 29 members, all related to different aspects of road traffic.

== Collections ==
Mobilia’s museum complex houses not only its own collections, but also material owned by a myriad of different museums, government agencies, associations, and private people. The collections include almost 63 000 objects, of which over 70% are photographs. The biggest client is the Finnish Traffic Agency with almost 35 000 objects divided between Road Administration and Canal Museum collections. Mobilia’s collection includes about 330 motor vehicles. The collections can be visited on preordered tours or on Wednesdays 1 PM, when there is a public tour of the collections. Majority of the collections is available online through Mobilia’s own E-Mobilia service and finna, a service housing most of Finnish heritage contributors.

== Networks ==
Mobilia is a professional member of FIVA, the NordBalt network of road museums in Nordic and Baltic countries, and IATM. Mobilia is a member of the network of Finnish traffic museums Trafiikki, the network of Finnish Military history museums, the Kangasala travel ring, the Finnish Travel museums and the network of Finnish car museums. Mobilia also operates the board of experts on road traffic led by the Finnish Heritage Agency.

== See also ==
- List of automotive museums
- Uusikaupunki Automobile Museum
- Finland's Motorcycle Museum
