= Miehikkälä =

- Municipality
- Miehikkälän kunta Miehikkälä kommun
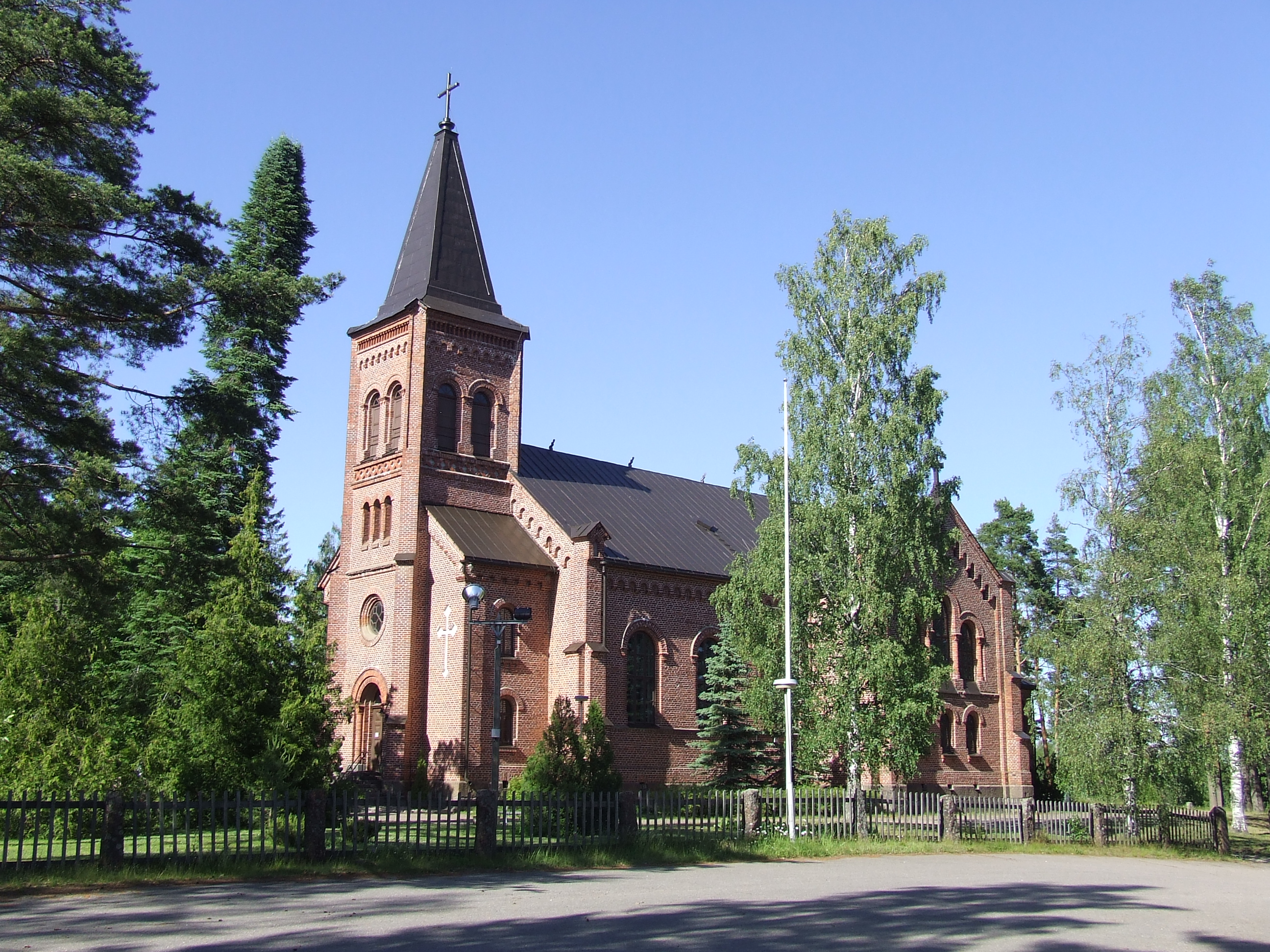
- Miehikkälä Church

- Coat of arms

- Location of Miehikkälä in Finland
- Interactive map of Miehikkälä
- Coordinates: 60°40′N 027°42′E
- Country: Finland
- Region: Southern Finland
- Sub-region: Kotka-Hamina
- Charter: 1887

Government
  - Municipal manager: Markku J. Forss

Area (2018-01-01)
  - Total: 440.34 km^{2} (170.02 sq mi)
  - Land: 422.63 km^{2} (163.18 sq mi)
  - Water: 18.18 km^{2} (7.02 sq mi)
  - Rank: 199th largest in Finland

Population (2025-12-31)
  - Total: 1,664
  - Rank: 270th largest in Finland
  - Density: 3.94/km^{2} (10.2/sq mi)

Population by native language
  - Finnish: 93.3% (official)
  - Others: 6.7%

Population by age
  - 0 to 14: 10.1%
  - 15 to 64: 52.3%
  - 65 or older: 37.6%
- Time zone: UTC+02:00 (EET)
  - Summer (DST): UTC+03:00 (EEST)
- Climate: Dfb
- Website: www.miehikkala.fi

Miehikkälä (Finnish pronunciation: [ˈmie̯hikːælæ]) is a municipality of Finland. It is located in the province of Southern Finland and is part of the Kymenlaakso region. The municipality has a population of 1,664 (31 December 2025), which make it the smallest municipality in Kymenlaakso in terms of population. It covers an area of 440.34 square kilometres (170.02 sq mi) of which 18.18 km^{2} (7.02 sq mi) is water. The population density is 3.94 inhabitants per square kilometre (10.2/sq mi).

Neighbouring municipalities are Hamina, Kouvola, Lappeenranta, Luumäki and Virolahti. It is 67 kilometres (42 mi) from Miehikkälä to Kotka and 64 kilometres (40 mi) to Lappeenranta. The municipality is unilingually Finnish. According to Traficom, Miehikkälä is the fourth most motorized municipality in Finland with 629 cars per thousand inhabitants.

The coat of arms of the municipality representing the letter M (which refers to Miehikkälä's name) was designed by Tapio Vallioja in 1956.

== Notable people ==
- Sulo Nurmela, skier
- Eeva Ruoppa, skier
- Martti Urpalainen, marathonist
- Reijo Taipale, singer
