= List of surviving elements of the Siegfried Line =

This article lists those elements of the Siegfried Line (German: Westwall) that have survived or whose function is still clearly recognisable. The structures are listed roughly from north to south and grouped by the individual construction programmes involved in building the Siegfried Line.

== Geldern position, Brüggen-Kleve Sector ==
- Kleve Sector of the Siegfried Line
  - Three bunkers of Regelbau Type 102V near Kranenburg-Nütterden
  - Regelbau Type 102V near Kessel
- Goch Sector of the Siegfried Line
  - Five bunkers of Regelbau Type 102V near Goch

== Border Guard Programme ==
- Bunker for an anti-tank gun emplacement near Aachen-Bildchen
- Garage for an anti-tank gun emplacement near Simmerath
- Bunker near Simmerath
- Garage for an anti-tank gun emplacement near Monschau-Konzen

== Engineer Programme ==
- Saarland
  - Merzig-Wadern county
    - Besseringen B-Werk
    - Bridge-guarding bunker, Mettlach (Regelbau B1-1 combined with Regelbau B1-18)
    - Bridge-guarding bunker, Besseringen (Double machine gun emplacement, machine gun emplacement, anti-tank gun emplacement)
    - Regelbau 105B8 (modified) in Besseringen
    - Regelbau 121B8 (modified) in Besseringen
    - Regelbau D2 in Beckingen (2 units)
    - Regelbau C1 in Merzig
    - Regelbau C7 near Beckingen (well preserved ruins)
    - Regelbau B1-1a in Mettlach (2 units)
    - Regelbau B1-1 above the Saar river loop (2 units)
    - Regelbau B1-1 in Besseringen
    - Regelbau B1-1 near St. Gangolf
    - Regelbau B1-1 in Merzig
    - Regelbau B1-1 in Saarfels
    - Regelbau B1-1 in the Haardt
    - Regelbau B1-2a above the Saar river loop
    - Regelbau B1-2a near St. Gangolf
    - Regelbau B1-5a in Mettlach
    - Regelbau B1-5a in Merzig (4 units)
    - Regelbau B1-5a in Besseringen (3 units)
    - Regelbau B1-5a near Fremersdorf station
    - Regelbau B1-7a in Mettlach (museum bunker)
    - Regelbau B1-7a in Besseringen (3 units)
    - Regelbau B1-20 (altered) in Besseringen
    - Regelbau B1-23 in Mettlach (2 units)
    - Regelbau B1-23 in Besseringen (2 units)
    - Regelbau B1-25 in Besseringen
    - Anti-tank gun emplacement near St. Gangolf
    - Three-storey, specially designed bunker near Mettlach

== Limes Programme ==
- North Rhine-Westphalia
  - Tank ditch (remains) in the forest opposite the Tüschenbroich Mill, Wegberg
  - Bunker ruins near Dahlheim-Rödgen
  - Bunker ruins at the Burgberg, Wassenberg Castle
  - Defended concrete garage/barn in Wassenberg, Rosenthal
  - Three water-filled tank ditches in the Wurm valley near Geilenkirchen
  - Tank obstacle south of Geilenkirchen consisting of concrete and U-profiles from Czech war booty material
  - Observation post near Herzogenrath-Bank
  - Diverse visible remains of four rows of dragon's teeth near Aachen-Eilendorf and Münsterbusch
  - One bunker to a special design within Burgau Castle near Düren-Niederau
  - Bunker of Regelbau Type 10a (Bunker 371) on the Burgberg near Hürtgenwald-Bergstein
  - Bunker of Regelbau Type 31 (Bunker 370) below the Burgberg near Hürtgenwald-Bergstein
  - First aid post bunker of Regelbau Type 32 in Simonskall. The house built on the top of the bunkers was not used to camouflage the bunker as is often suggested, but was first built in the 1950s.
  - Group of bunkers in the Buhlert forest area
    - Two multiple fortified positions Regelbau Type 10 (Bunker 131 and 132)
    - Double fortified position Regelbau Type 11 (Bunker 139/140)
    - MG bunker Regelbau Type 23 (Bunker 135)
    - One bunker for water supplies
  - Fortified position of Regelbau Type 10 with a house built on top after the war Near Simmerath-Hechelscheidt
  - Bunker for water supplies near Dahlem-Baasem
  - Double fortified position of Regelbau Type 11 near Baasem
  - Machine gun emplacement of Regelbau Type 1 B1/1 near Berk (Dahlem)
  - Bunker under the Dahlem-Kronenburg training establishment
  - Machine gun emplacement, modified Regelbau Type 23 by the Trans-Venn Railway
  - Two multiple fortified positions of Regelbau Type 10a near Dahlem-Kronenburg
  - Bunker southeast of Osburg in the vicinity of the B 52 federal highway by the Grünbrücherschneise
- Saarland
  - Merzig-Wadern county
    - Regelbau 2 in Beckingen
    - Regelbau 10 in Saarhölzbach (2 units)
    - Regelbau 10 in Mettlach (with battle compartment on top)
    - Regelbau 10 in Besseringen (3 units)
    - Regelbau 10 near St. Gangolf
    - Regelbau 10 in Merzig (5 units)
    - Regelbau 10 (with battle compartment on top) in Merzig (2 units)
    - Regelbau 10 (hillside design) in Merzig
    - Regelbau 10 in Harlingen
    - Regelbau 10 in Bietzen (3 units)
    - Regelbau 10 in Saarfels
    - Regelbau 10 in Haustadt (museum bunker)
    - Regelbau 10a in Mettlach (3 units)
    - Regelbau 10a (with battle compartment on top) in Besseringen
    - Regelbau 10a in Merzig (8 units)
    - Regelbau 10a (hillside design) in Merzig (2 units)
    - Regelbau 10a in Bietzen (3 units, 1 museum bunker)
    - Regelbau 10a in Beckingen (6 units)
    - Regelbau 10b1 in Mettlach
    - Regelbau 10b1 in Merzig
    - Regelbau 11 in Saarhölzbach
    - Regelbau 11 in Besseringen
    - Regelbau 11 in Merzig (3 units)
    - Regelbau 11 in Brotdorf (2 units)
    - Regelbau 19 in Beckingen
    - Regelbau 23 in Mettlach
    - Regelbau 23 in Merzig (3 units)
    - Regelbau 31 in Brotdorf
    - Regelbau 522B01 near Besseringen (variant of the Regelbau Type B1-25 to the “B-old” standard)
    - Regelbau 1 (with open embrasure) museum bunker “Anton” near Besseringen
- Baden-Württemberg
  - Extensive bunkers and fortifications at the Isteiner Klotz

== Aachen-Saar Programme ==
- Saarland
  - Merzig-Wadern county
    - Regelbau 101v in Rimlingen
    - Regelbau 105b in Beckingen (5 units, 1 museum bunker)
    - Regelbau 105d in Beckingen (2 units)
    - Regelbau 106b in Beckingen
    - Regelbau 108b in Beckingen (2 units)
    - Regelbau 110 (with entranceway and Hohlgang) in Merzig (5 units, 1 museum bunker)
    - Regelbau 114a in Beckingen (museum bunker)
    - Regelbau 115b in Merzig
    - Regelbau 120d (hillside and cave passage) near Harlingen (ruins)
    - Special bunker with Type 20P7 six-port turret and group to “A” standard (two-storey) near Fremersdorf station

== Wartime Regelbau ==
- Saarland
  - Merzig-Wadern county
    - Regelbau 51a near Oberleuken (at least 2 units)
    - Regelbau 501 in Sinz (2 units)
    - Regelbau 502 near Oberleuken
    - Regelbau 506 in Besseringen
    - Regelbau 509c in Besseringen (2 units)
    - Regelbau 509c (Vorderhang) in Merzig
    - Regelbau 395 (“Heinrich”) in Beckingen (2 units)

== Special elements ==
- Various covered positions and MG emplacements reinforced at the Orscholz Switch
- Diverse visible remains of five rows of dragon's teeth west of Aachen
- Armoured walls at the Aachener Schneeberg and at the Aachen-Visé railway line
- Observation post near Aachen-Schleckheim
- Five rows of dragon's teeth near Aachen-Köpfchen
- Bunker in the Iterbach valley near Walheim
- Bunker in the Aachen Forest near Entenpfuhl - Regelbau SK6/a
- Regimen valley battle position near Aachen-Brand - Regelbau 117
- Five rows of dragon's teeth in the area of the Hotel Relais Königsberg
- Bridge design of the five rows of dragon's teeth at the dam of the Dreilägerbach
- Bunker for water supplies near Lammersdorf hunting lodge
- Diverse visible remains of five rows of dragon's teeth between Lammersdorf and Monschau
  - Remains of a movable barrier near Lammersdorf
- Two armoured concrete shields near Hellenthal-Wahlerscheid
- Bunker for water supply near Hellenthal-Wahlerscheid
- Parallel running four and five rows of dragon's teeth between Hellenthal-Hollerath and Ormont

=== Rhineland-Palatinate ===
- Westwallmuseen Wiltingen: MG Schartenstand and artillery OP
- verschiedene Höckerlinien between Brandscheid and Eschfeld
- intact Gruppenunterstand near Roth/Our
- Katzenkopf B-Werk near Irrel (Siegfried Line Museum)
- Gerstfeldhöhe A-Werk in Niedersimten in the borough of Pirmasens (Siegfried Line Museum)
- Siegfried Line Museum, Bad Bergzabern

=== Saarland ===
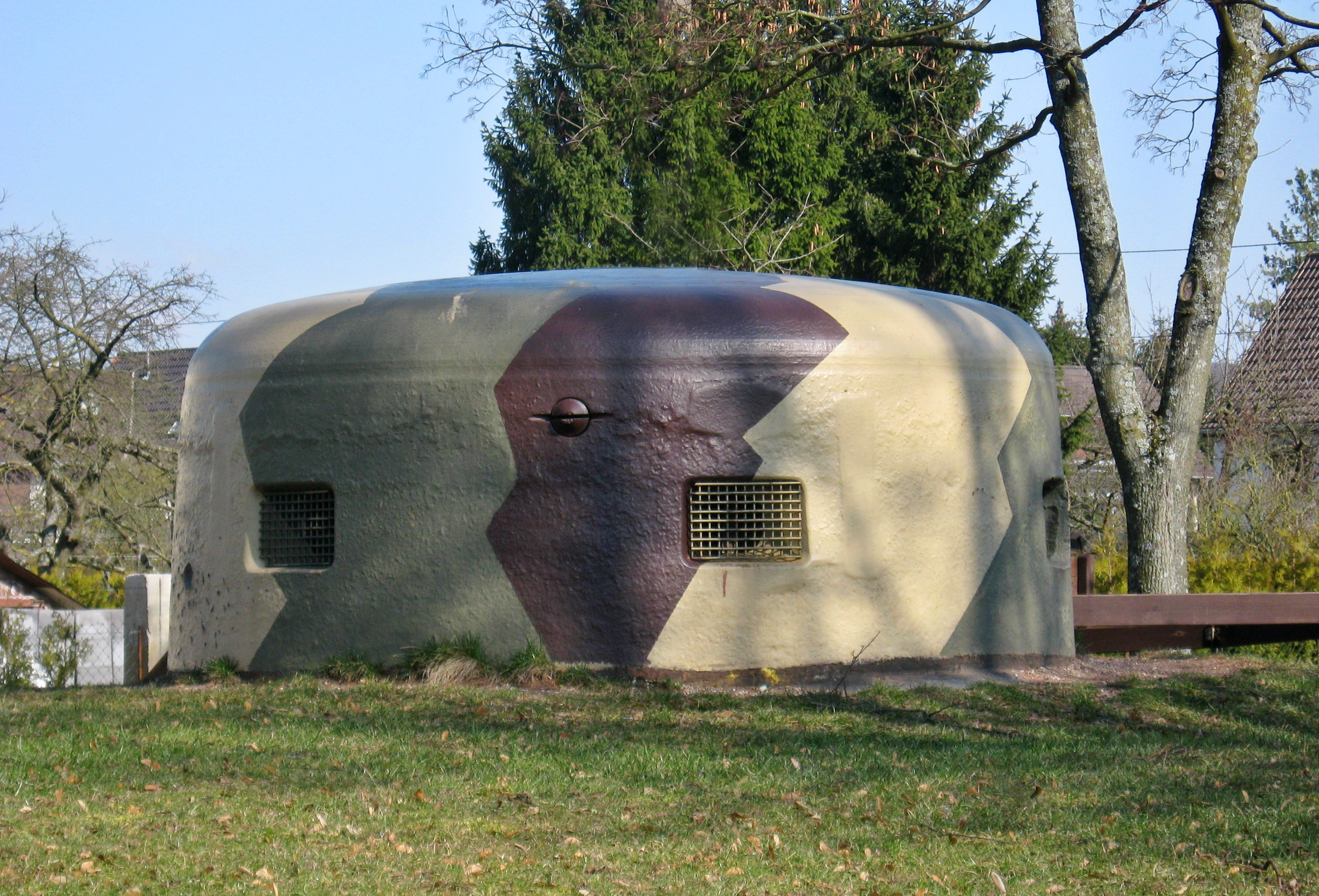
Surviving gun turret near Pachten, Germany

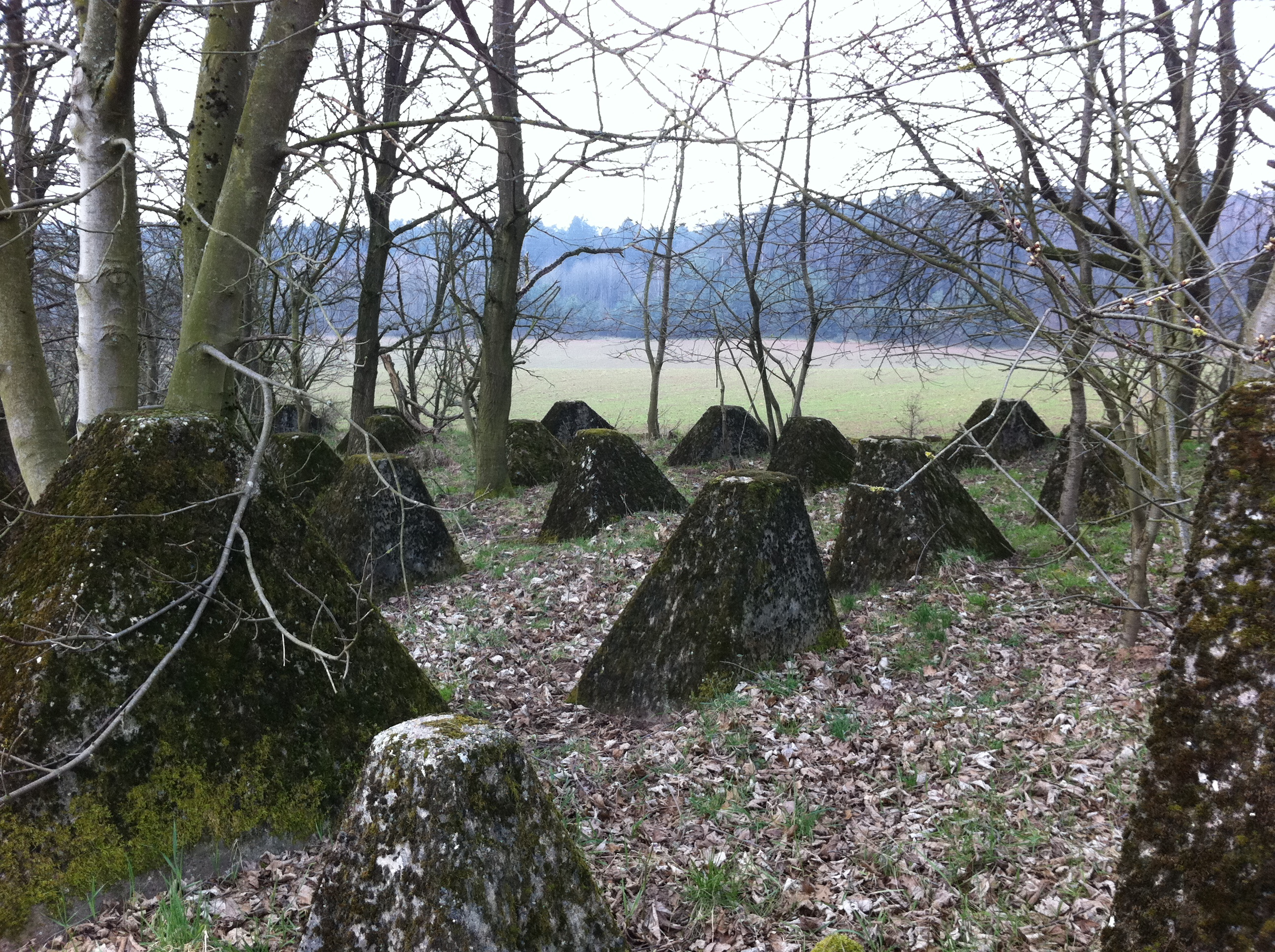
Line of dragon's teeth near Winterbach in the Saarland

- Regelbau 114a in Beckingen
- Regelbau in Haustadt
- Siegfried Line bunker in Pachten
- Siegfried Line bunker Rentrisch
- Halberg position with Bunker WH 316
- Five rows of dragon's teeth near der B 41 between St. Wendel and Bliesen sowie Teile davon in Hofeld-Mauschbach and Baltersweiler
- Five rows of dragon's teeth near the Harschberger Hof on the B 269 federal road between St. Wendel and Winterbach
- Bunker near Hofeld-Mauschbach of unknown type (not blown up)

=== Baden ===
- Bunker of Regelbau Type 10 in Rastatt
- Bunker of Regelbau Type 32 in Dettenheim-Rußheim (managed by the Dettenheim Bunker Museum Society)

=== Air Defence Zone West ===
- Bunker near Vettweis-Ginnick
- Bunker Type K in Isweiler near Frauwüllesheim
- Bunker near Nideggen-Schmidt
- Position near Kirspenich
- Position near Dahlem
- Water bunker near Kommern
- Armoured bunker near Bouderath
- Heavy anti-aircraft position in the Vollausbau near Zingsheim

== See also ==
- Siegfried Line

== Literature ==
- Dieter Bettinger, Martin Büren: Der Westwall. Die Geschichte der deutschen Westbefestigung im Dritten Reich. Vol. 1. Der Bau des Westwalls 1936–1945, Vol. 2. Die technische Ausführung des Westwalls. Biblio, Osnabrück, 1990, ISBN 3-7648-1458-6.
- Jörg Fuhrmeister: Der Westwall: Geschichte and Gegenwart. Motorbuch, Stuttgart, 2004, ISBN 3-613-02291-5.
- Dieter Robert Bettinger, Hans-Josef Hansen, Daniel Lois: Der Westwall von Kleve bis Basel. Auf den Spuren deutscher Geschichte. 2. Auflage. Nebel Verlag, Eggolsheim, 2008, ISBN 978-3-89555-414-8.
- Manfred Groß: Der Westwall zwischen Niederrhein und Schnee-Eifel. Rhineland-Verlag, Cologne, 1989, ISBN 3-7927-0644-X.
- Doris Seck: Saarländische Kriegsjahre. Vol. 2: Unternehmen Westwall. Buchverlag Saarbrücker Zeitung, Saarbrücken, 1985, ISBN 3-922807-05-4.
