= Siegfried Line Museum =

Siegfried Line Museum may refer to the following Second World War museums:

- Siegfried Line Museum, Irrel, housed in an old bunker at Irrel, Germany
- Siegfried Line Museum, Pirmasens, housed in an old bunker at Niedersimpten, near Pirmasens, Germany
