= Westwallbunker (Pachten) =

Coordinates: 49°20′59″N 6°42′42″E

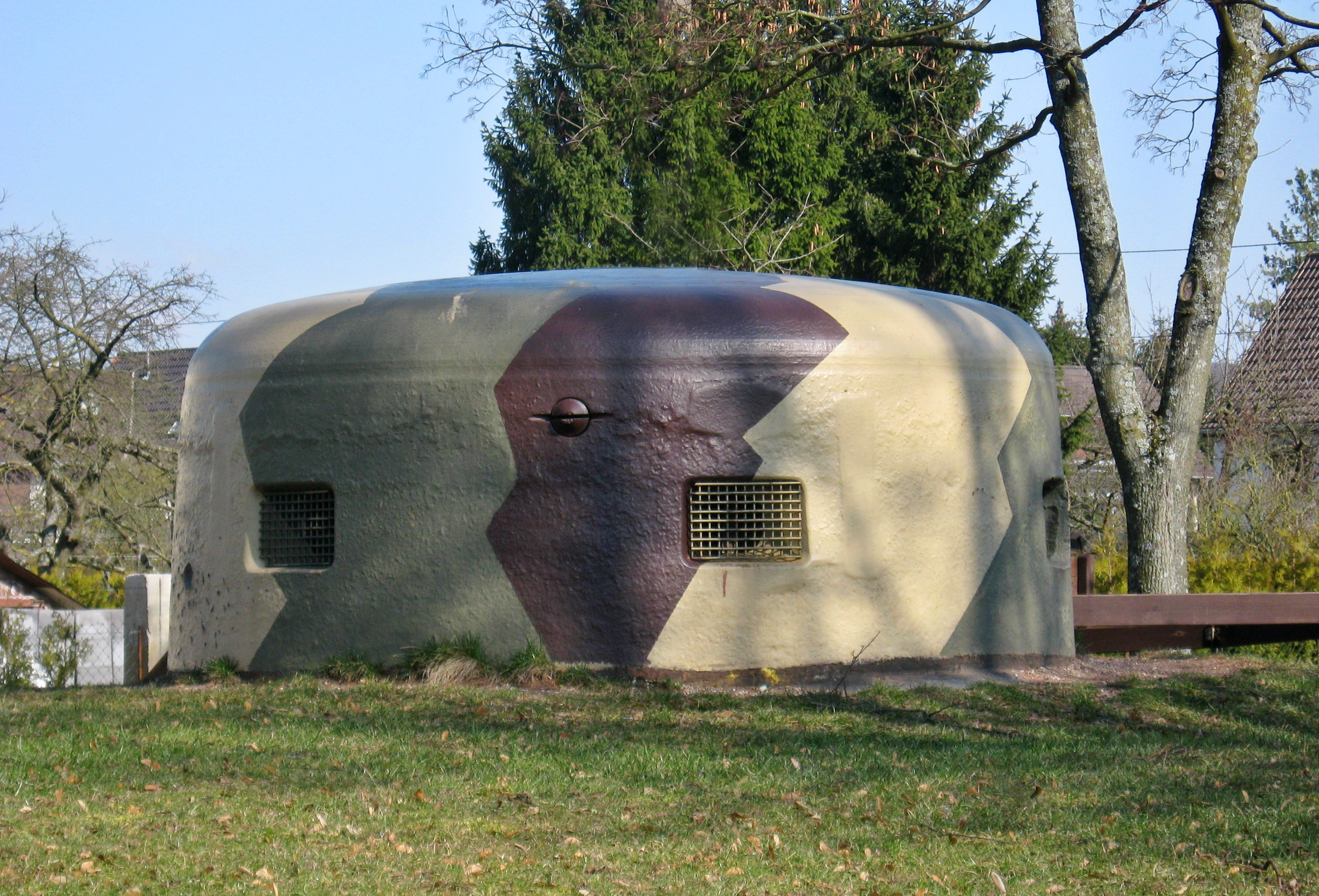

Westwallbunker is a bunker and museum in Saarland, Germany, that was part of the Siegfried Line. The bunker was built in 1939.

== See also ==
- Regelbau
- List of surviving elements of the Siegfried Line
