= Siegfried Line Museum, Irrel =

The Siegfried Line Museum (German: Westwallmuseum Irrel) lies near the German-Luxembourg border in the Eifel mountains. It is housed in a bunker that was part of the former Siegfried Line (Westwall), the Katzenkopf Strongpoint (Panzerwerk Katzenkopf), which was built from 1937 to 1939. The bunker and museum lies within the municipality of Irrel and have been open to visitors since 1979. Together with other bunkers the Panzerwerk Katzenkopf was built to guard the main road from Cologne to the city of Luxembourg. It is the northernmost strongpoint in the Siegfried Line.

These strongpoints differed from the other roughly 15,000 fortifications of the Siegfried Line in having an armoured cupola and wall thicknesses of at least 1.0 metre. 32 examples of such structures were built to construction thickness "B" with exterior walls of reinforced concrete up to 2 metres thick. Another of these so called B-Werke ("B Works") that has been open to the public since 2006 is B-Werk Besseringen in the Saarland.

The above-ground section of the bunder was blown up in 1947 and its remains were bulldozed into a heap. In July 1976 the excavation of the bunker began the majority of the work being carried out by the Volunteer Fire Service of Irrel. The Siegfried Line Museum has been established on 3 accessible levels of the strongpoint since 1979. There are pictures and weapons of the Second World War period. The museum is only open to casual visitors on Sundays and public holidays (during the summer).
