= Winterbach (St. Wendel) =

- Ortsteil of Sankt Wendel
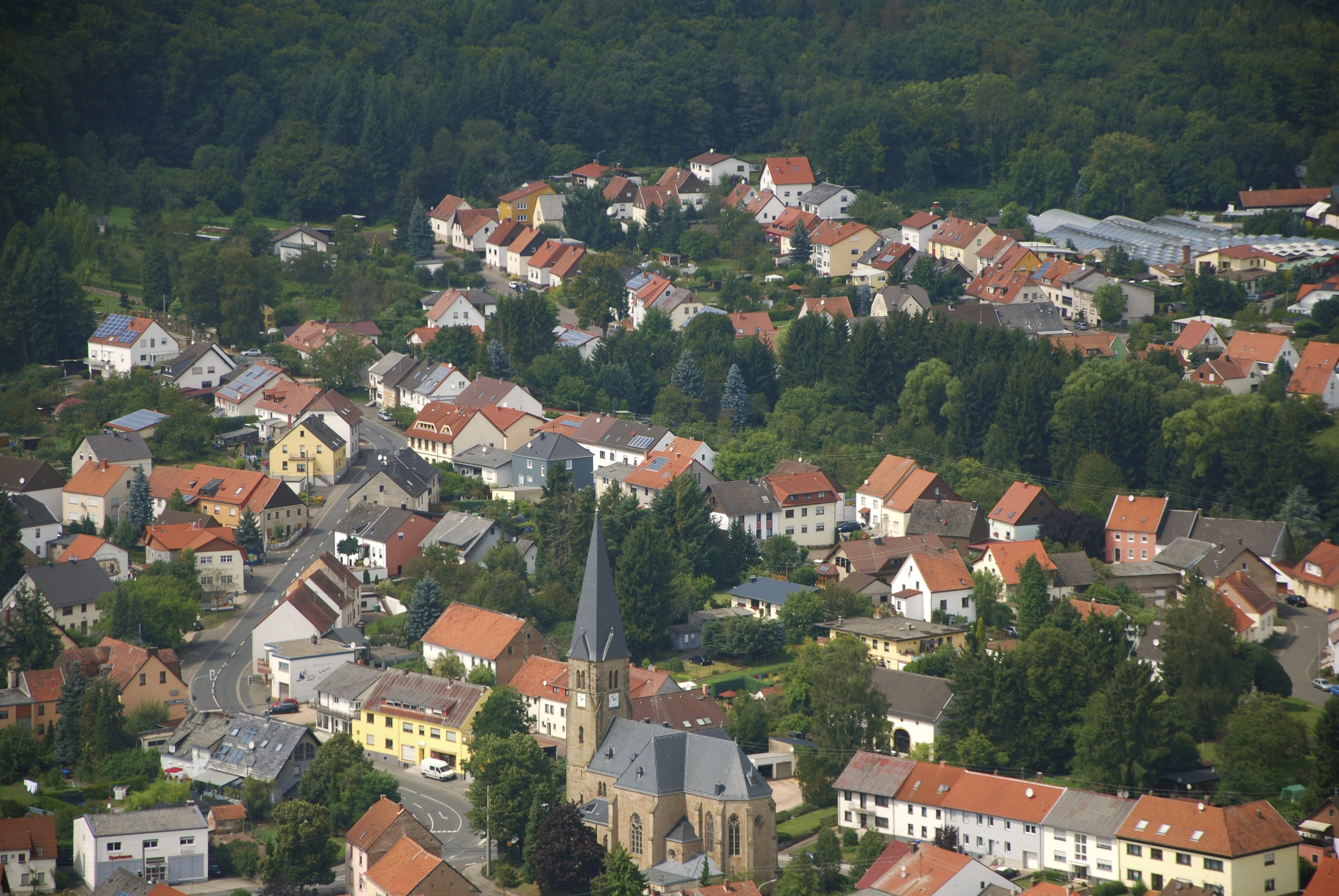

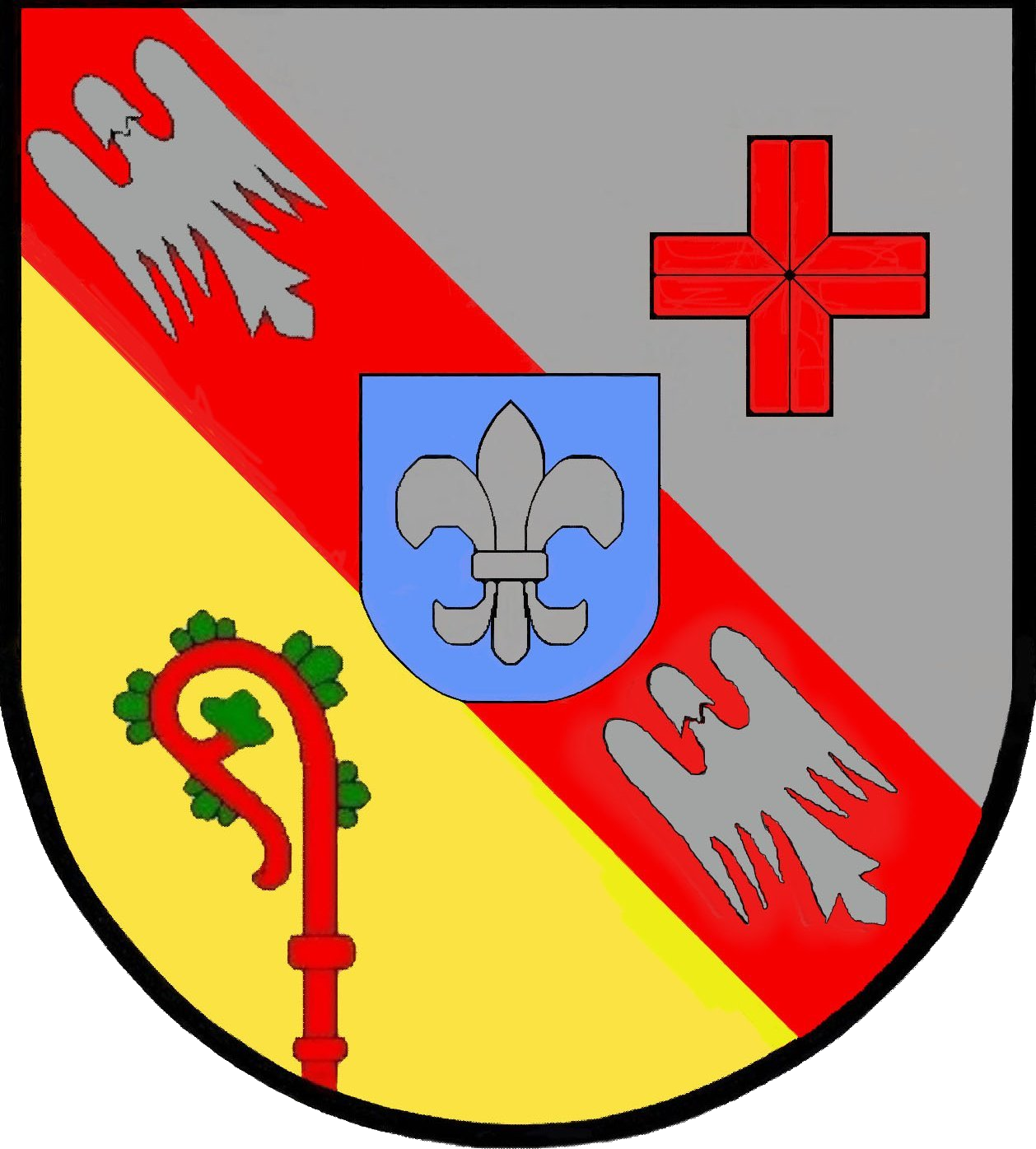
- Coat of arms
- Interactive map of Winterbach
- Location within Germany Location within Saarland
- Coordinates: 49°28′31″N 7°06′09″E
- Country: Germany
- State: Saarland
- District: Sankt Wendel
- Town: Sankt Wendel

Area
  - Total: 5.96 km^{2} (2.30 sq mi)
- Elevation: 312 m (1,024 ft)

Population (2011)
  - Total: 2,100
  - Density: 350/km^{2} (910/sq mi)
- Time zone: UTC+01:00 (CET)
  - Summer (DST): UTC+02:00 (CEST)
- Postal codes: 66606
- Dialling codes: 06851
- Website: official site

Winterbach (German pronunciation: [ˈvɪntɐbax]) is a district 6 km west of the city of St. Wendel, or Sankt Wendel, in Saarland, Germany. It is the second largest district of the city.

== History ==
Winterbach is located on the Rheinstraße, a Roman road, whose origins date back to the Celtic times. Therefore, settlement may have begun as early as 500 BC in the Hallstatt period. The only completely preserved relic of the Hallstatt period in Saarland, a grindstone, was found in Winterbach. Some Celtic tombs have been located near the Worrach, a watercourse. In Roman times there were several villas in Winterbach, whose foundations were often discovered in the 20th century during construction work. However, even then the expansion of homes and roads was too far advanced to permit more extensive archaeological investigation of the prehistoric development.

Winterbach was first documented in 1242. in August, 2012 a three-day celebration of the 770th anniversary of town's founding was organized.

On January 1, 1974, the community of Winterbach was incorporated into the county seat of Sankt Wendel.

Five rows of dragon's teeth remaining from the Siegfried Line can be found along federal road B 269 between Sankt Wendel and Winterbach.
