= Regelbau 638 =

German army standardized bunker

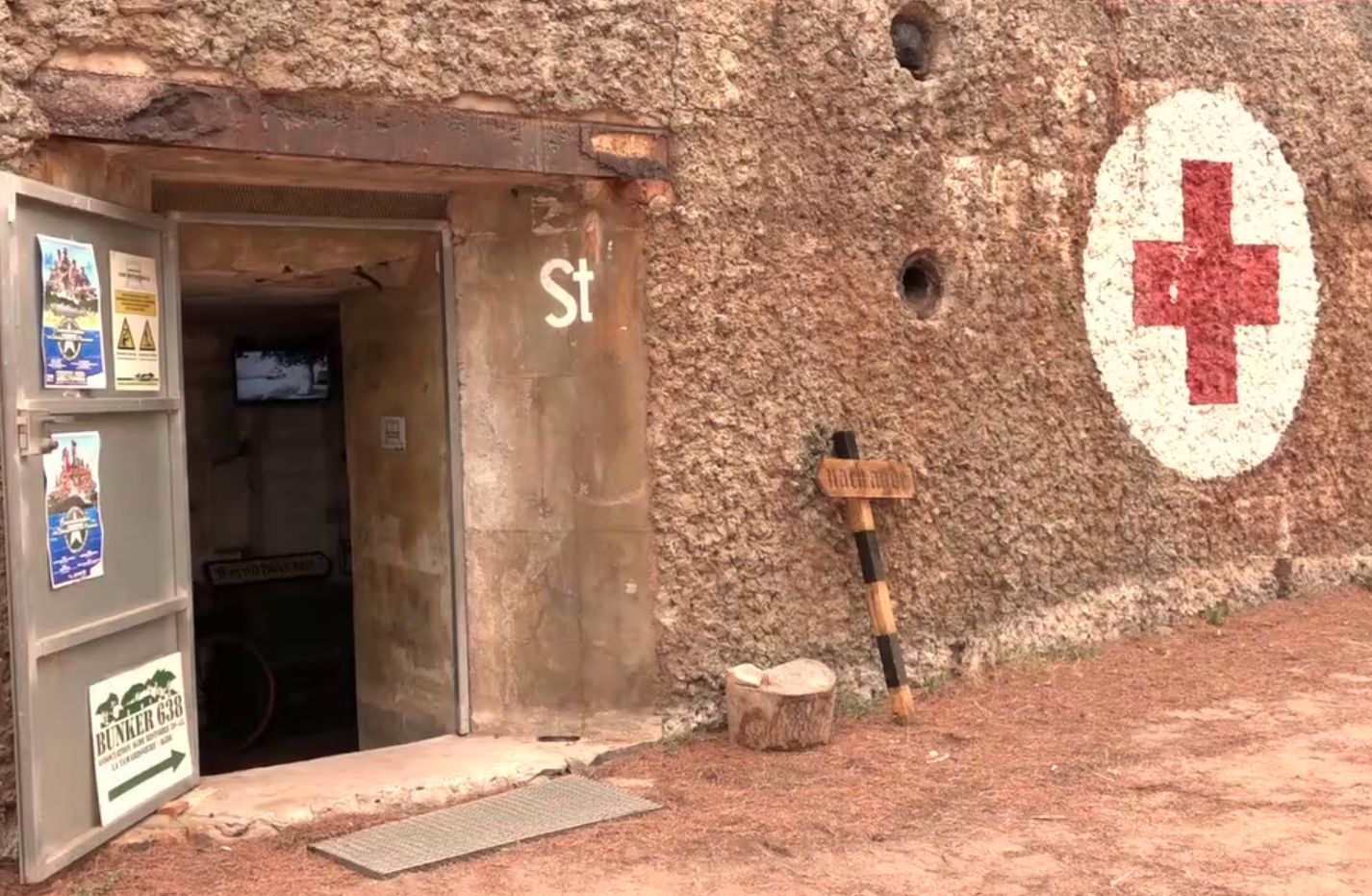
Bunker 638 at La Tamarissière. The painted St marking indicates to the occupants that the bunker is a permanent fortification (Ständig ausbau).

Regelbau 638 was a German army standardized bunker.

Before and during World War II, the Wehrmacht built several standardised bunkers and weapon positions in Germany and German-occupied countries. These buildings were called Regelbau, i.e. standardised buildings. Regelbau 638 was a small field hospital (Kleiner Sanitätsunterstand).

A fully restored Regelbau 638 bunker can be seen at the museum, Fjell festning at Fjell Fortress outside Bergen, Norway and in Agde, France. In 2009–2010, this bunker was restored inside and supplied with authentic German hospital and sanitary equipment from World War II by the local voluntary society Fjell Festnings Militærhistoriske Samlinger.
