= Orscholz Switch =

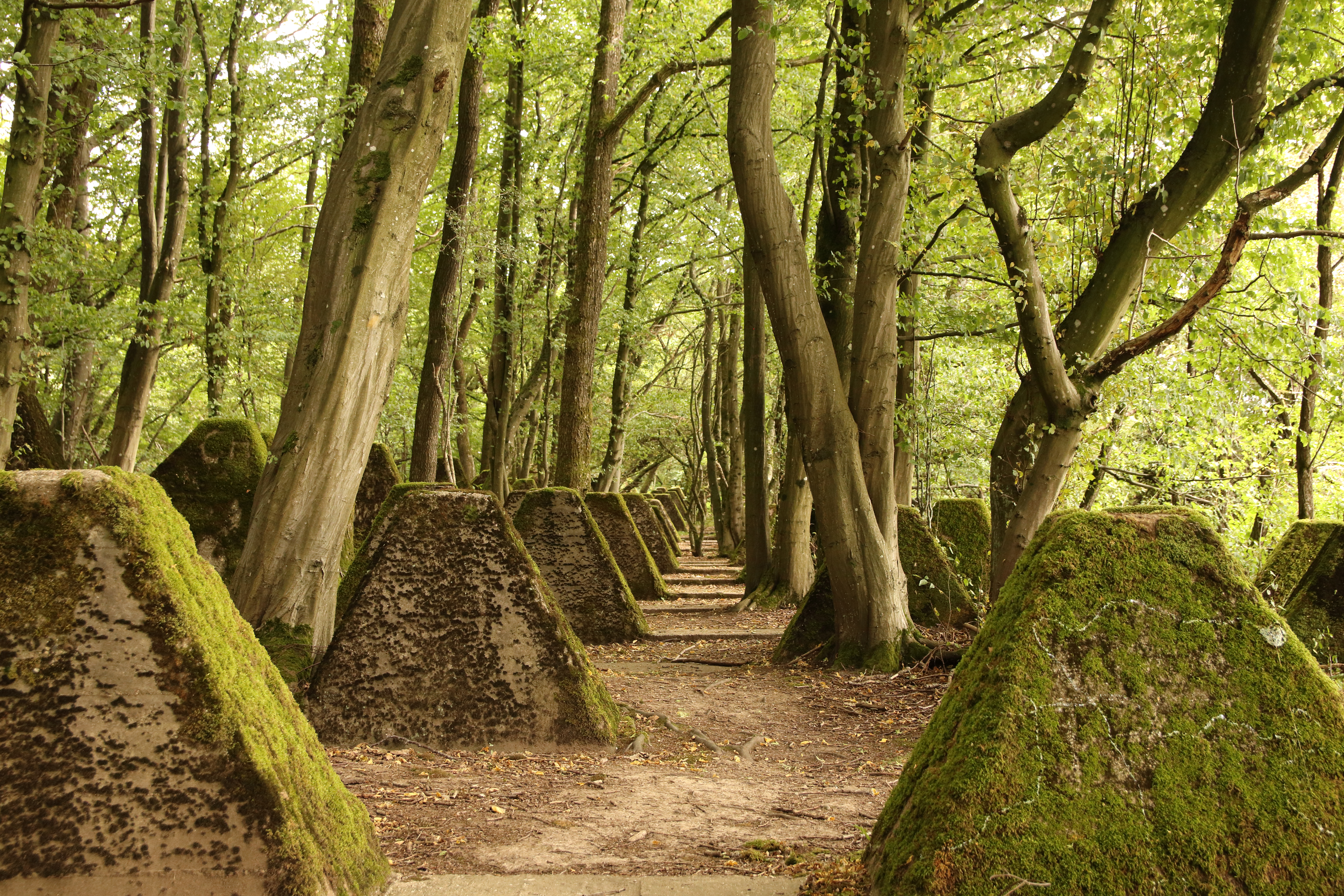
The hiking trail "Höckerlinienpfad" at the Orscholz Switch leads through a tank barrier from the Second World War.

The Orscholz Switch (German: Orscholzriegel), or Siegfried Switch, was a military defensive "switch" position and part of the Siegfried Line (Westwall) located in the triangle between the rivers Saar and Moselle. It was built in 1939 and 1940 and incorporated 75 bunkers as well as 10.2 km of tank obstacles in the form of dragon's teeth. This defensive line ran from Trier to Nennig along the Moselle and from Nennig in an easterly direction to Orscholz on the loop in the Saar river at Mettlach.

Although the West Wall in this sector lay behind the Saar, the Germans in 1939 and 1940 had constructed a supplementary fortified line across the base of the triangle from Nennig in the west to Orscholz, at a great northwestward loop of the Saar. The Germans called the position the Orscholz Switch; the Americans knew it as the Siegfried Switch. Assuming the neutrality of Luxembourg, the switch position was designed to protect Trier and the Moselle corridor and to prevent outflanking of the strongest portion of the West Wall, that lying to the southeast across the face of the Saar industrial area.

In 1945 - towards the end of the Second World War - the Orscholz Switch was the scene of hard fighting for months.

During Operation Undertone (15 - 24 March 1945) it lay on the left flank of advancing US Army units.

== See also ==
- Besseringen B-Werk
