= Siegfried Line Museum, Pirmasens =

Coordinates: 49°10′32″N 7°35′47″E

The Siegfried Line Museum at Pirmasens (German: Westwallmuseum Pirmasens) is a museum in the German state of Rhineland-Palatinate that is housed in a former subterranean fortification on the edge of the village of Niedersimten in southwest Palatinate (region). Its theme is war, but it also views itself as a memorial to peace. It was founded by the Gerstfeldhöhe Society (Verein HGS Gerstfeldhöhe) and is run in cooperation with the town of Pirmasens.

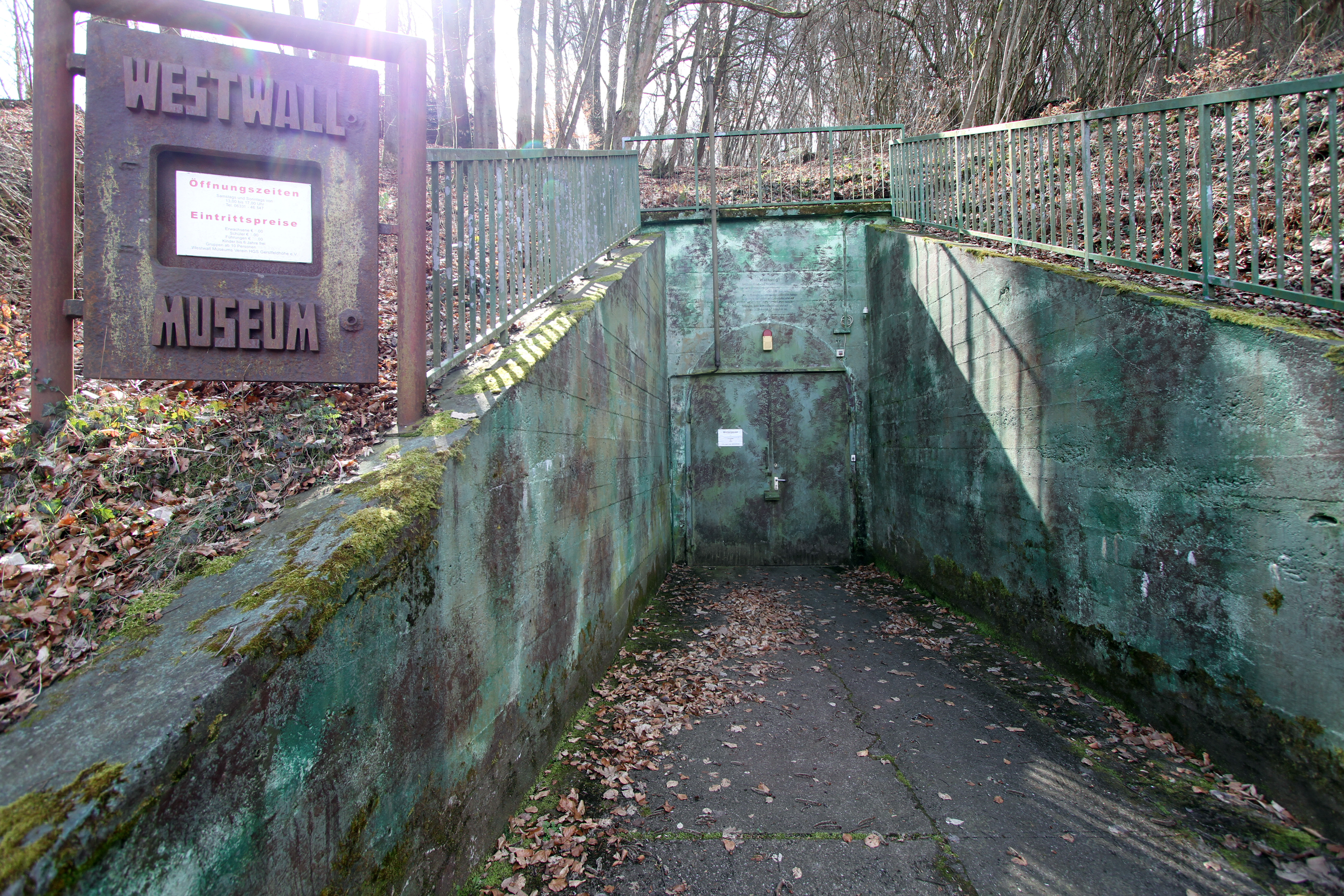

== Location ==
The "Westwall" museum lies underground in the former fortification of Gerstfeldhöhe. The village of Niedersimten, two kilometres south of Pirmasens, is reached via Bitscher Straße, which continues to Bitche over the French border. Two decommissioned tanks guard the entrance to the fortress and museum.

== History ==
In the course of the building programme for the construction of the Siegfried Line (German: Westwall), during the Nazi era, work on the huge, bunker-like Gerstfeldhöhe fortification began in 1938. Vaulted galleries, thousands of yards long, were blasted and hewn out of solid rock. It was intended to have an underground narrow gauge railway that would carry soldiers and military equipment over a distance of three miles to pre-planned battle positions on the nearby French border. After the beginning of the Second World War in 1939, the construction project was continued for another year before being abandoned.

The Gerstfeldhöhe tunnel system was used after the war until the early 1990s by the U.S. Army as a warehouse for vehicle spares. In the county of Südwestpfalz alone, the U.S. Army had more than 20 such underground facilities.

== Significance ==
The Siegfried Line, which was only partially completed, ran for about 400 miles from Weil on the Upper Rhine to Kleve on the Lower Rhine. It consisted of around 20,000 different military installations. After the war ended in 1945, most of the buildings were demolished or left to decay naturally. The fort at Gerstfeldhöhe is one of the few well-preserved sites - probably because it was never in use during the war.

== Visiting ==
The temperature throughout the fort is a constant 8 °C. It may be visited during the published visiting hours.

During a one and a half hour guided tour, which runs for roughly a kilometre of tunnel partly hewn out of the rock, the visitor can see an impressive amount of military equipment, mainly received from private collectors. Also on the gallery walls may be seen the written comments and messages of American soldiers. Its artifacts include an armoury stocked with all types of weapon, including smaller items such as gas masks and machine guns as well as larger exhibits, for example, an anti-aircraft gun weighing more than two tons, large lorries, heavy motorcycles and a VW Kübelwagen. Soldiers quarters have been faithfully reconstructed. Mannequins are dressed in Wehrmacht and Nazi uniforms.

== See also ==
- List of surviving elements of the Siegfried Line
