= Regelbau =

WWII German defensive fortifications

Examples of Regelbau designs that were used in the construction of the Neckar-Enz position

The Regelbau (German for "standard(ised) construction") were a series of standardised bunker designs built in large numbers by the Germans in the Siegfried Line (German: Westwall) and the Atlantic Wall as part of their defensive fortifications prior to and during the Second World War.

== Purpose ==
There were several advantages to standardising the design and construction:

1. Retention of proven design features when building new bunkers
2. Simpler manufacture of large quantities e.g. of armoured and ventilation components and simplified ordering from the industrial manufacturers involved
3. Easier surveying of construction sites with regard to the tactical situation
4. Simplified construction process
5. Easier supply of materials to the construction site

== Extent of standardization ==
As early as 1933 the Army command began work on the standardisation of defensive works with their publication of the Order for the Construction of Permanent Fortifications (Vorschrift zum Bau ständiger Befestigungsanlagen) or B. st. B. In addition to general directions, it also contained very specific regulations on the armoured components (Panzerungsteilen or P-Teile) and ventilation components (Lüftungsteilen or ML-Teile) to be used. The most important aspect of standardization was construction thickness (Ausbaustärke). This referred to the thickness of the walls and ceilings of the bunker. In the four years it took to build the Siegfried Line, changes were repeatedly made to the list of components to be used. The reasons for this were continual developments in weapon technology as well as the availability of armoured components and raw materials (steel) in general.

Construction thicknesses (wall and ceiling thicknesses):

- A = 3.5 metres
- A1 = 2.5 metres
- B new = 2.0 metres
- B old = 1.5 metres
- B 1 = 1.0 metres
- C = 0.6 metres
- D = 0.3 metres

In addition, bunker design was arranged in "series", the 1939 designs with A and B thickness falling into the 100 series. Later 400, 500 and 600 series were created, the new series were more designed to enable the casemate to be capable of taking captured weapons than to be stronger, the 400 series was designed for Czechoslovak weapons. The Channel Islands received mainly 600 series constructions.

Whilst constructions were undertaken and planned by the OT for the Heer (army), the Kriegsmarine (navy) and Luftwaffe (airforce) would also man some of the fortifications, and they had their own designs and designations of fortifications, the Navy used M (Mittlere or Medium) for normal sea defence batteries with S (Schwere or Heavy) for the larger calibre guns, with FL (Flak or anti-aircraft) and V (Versorgung or support) for other emplacements, using thicknesses varying from 1.2m to 2.2m. The Luftwaffe simply added a letter L to all their designs, copying 1938 designs before creating their own series.

The standardisation greatly simplified the manufacture of equipment, the supply of materials and the budgetary and financial control of the construction as well as the speed of planning for construction projects.

== Development of Regelbau designs from 1936 to 1940 ==
Following the occupation of German territories west of the Rhine, fortress engineers began the construction of the Siegfried Line in 1936. In doing so they were able to benefit from their earlier experience of bunker construction. In compliance with the Versailles Treaty, they had already built the Wetterau-Main-Tauber position and Neckar-Enz position before 1936. When, in 1936, construction started on the Siegfried Line itself, they were able at the outset to utilize designs from the two earlier fortifications. From these existing plans, fortress pioneers rapidly developed improved bunkers that were built from 1937. This building phase was named the Engineer Construction Programme and was characterized by bunkers built to B1 standard thicknesses (see above). Since the thickness of these structures was soon considered to be too weak and because there was a large number Regelbau designs (and hence confusion), new types were developed and implemented from 1938. These new designs were achieved largely by simplifying and reducing the number of Regelbau types. This new building phase was called the Limes Programme.

The fortress engineers were no longer in charge of construction; instead Organization Todt (OT) took over, promising Hitler it would deliver the number of structures he wanted. Plans for the Limes Programme did not envisage the inclusion of the cities of Aachen and Saarbrücken and they therefore ended up in front of the planned line of fortifications. That changed in 1939 with the Aachen-Saar Programme. From 1939, yet more new Regelbau bunkers were designed for the construction programme that saw increases in the construction thicknesses. From then on, only bunkers that met the "B new" and "A" standards were to be built. With the outbreak of the Second World War on 1 September 1939, priorities for the construction of the Siegfried Line changed. The renewed shortage of raw materials led to the development of a new series of Regelbau designs, the so-called wartime standard designs or Kriegsregelbauten. After the "lavish" Regelbauten of the Aachen-Saar Programme, the final construction phase was dominated by massive financial constraints. For example, observation cupolas and flank firing positions were no longer provided and the rooms were smaller.

== Expansion of construction projects from 1941 to 1944 ==
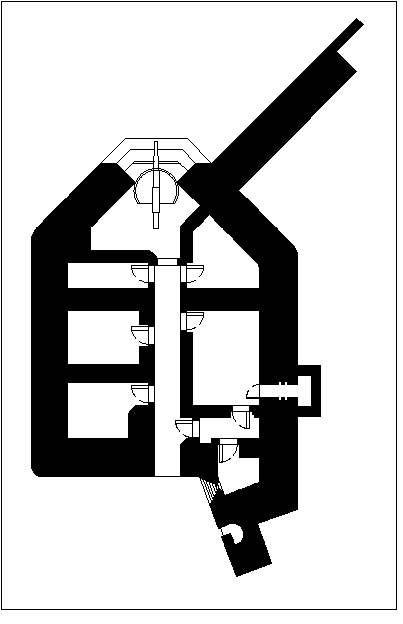
Casemate for French 10.5 cm K 331(f), Series 600, given the name "Jäger" after the OT officer who designed it.

In 1940 work was ordered on a number of construction projects in Western Europe. Amongst the first were the Dover Strait guns begun in July 1940 and included Todt Battery. Building began in February 1941 on the Saint-Nazaire submarine base Following the first effective commando raid in March 1941 Operation Claymore and with the planning of Operation Barbarossa, Hitler decided in June 1941 to strengthen the west against possible attacks. The Channel Islands were chosen to become major fortifications, followed in 1942 with the order to build the Atlantic Wall.

A mass of equipment was needed, cement, sand, gravel and steel to construct the concrete fortifications, weapons and armour plate for defence and hundreds of thousands of workers. To offset shortages, equipment from French and other occupied armies were incorporated in the defences, casemates designed for non-German artillery, anti tank and machine guns and the use of turrets from obsolete tanks in tobrukstand pill boxes (tobruk pits).

The labour came from an expansion of the Organisation Todt, who contracted with building construction companies from Germany and occupied countries to undertake the work. The OT provided them with equipment, supervisors and labour. Labour comprised skilled volunteers, engineers, designers and supervisors, who were paid and treated well, second came volunteer workers, often skilled technicians, such as carpenters, plumbers, electricians and metal workers, again these workers were paid, took holidays and were well treated. Next came unskilled forced labour, paid very little and treated quite harshly, lastly came effective slave labour, paid so little, badly fed and treated very harshly.

New designs were added to the Regelbau system, some were variants on existing designs, modified to suit local conditions, others were created to encompass new weapons, such as improved radar units, V-weapons and weapons captured from occupied countries.

Where army or naval engineers were responsible for a major construction, rather than the OT, the construction often did not follow the Regelbau system.

== See also ==
- Regelbau 638
- List of surviving elements of the Siegfried Line

== Literature ==
- Dieter Bettinger, Martin Büren: Der Westwall. Die Geschichte der deutschen Westbefestigungen im Dritten Reich. Vol. 2: Die technische Ausführung des Westwalls. Biblio Verlag, Osnabrück, 1990, ISBN 3-7648-1458-6.
- Harry Lippmann (ed.): Die Regelbauten des Heeres im Atlantikwall, Cologne, 1986, (IBA-Informationen Sonderheft 10, ZDB-ID 57998-1).
- Rudi Rolf: Der Atlantikwall. Perlenschnur aus Stahlbeton. AMA-Verlag, Beetsterzwaag, 1983, ISBN 90-6474-025-9.
