= Philippine Army Museum =

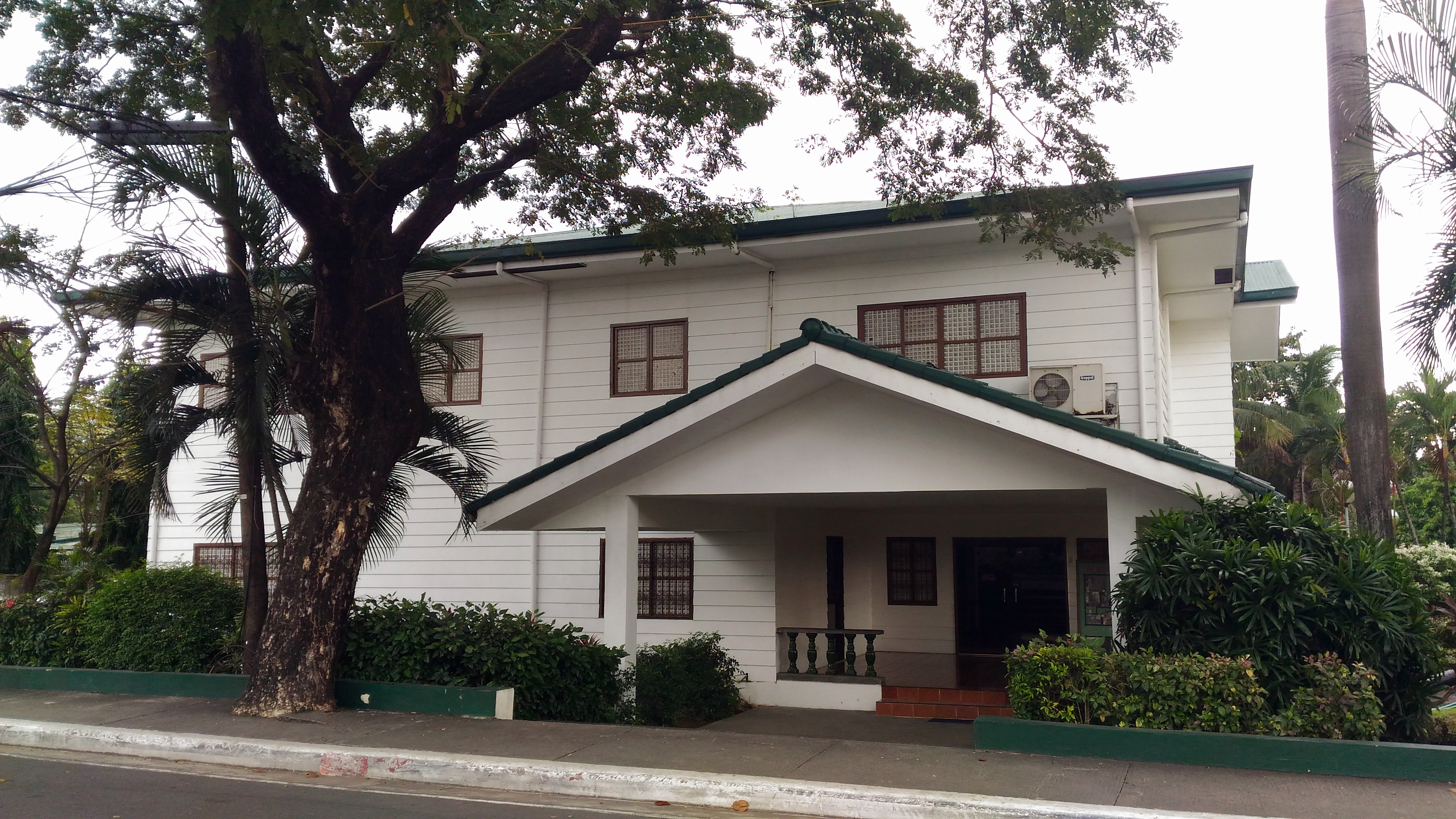
- Facade of the Philippine Army Museum

- Location within Metro Manila Location within Luzon Location within Philippines
- Established: July 26, 1979; 46 years ago
- Location: Fort Bonifacio, Taguig, Philippines
- Coordinates: 14°32′00″N 121°02′42″E
- Type: Military history museum
- Owner: Philippine Army

The Philippine Army Museum is a military museum located within the premises of Fort Bonifacio in Taguig, Philippines.

== History ==
The Philippine Army Museum was established on July 26, 1979. In the late 1980s, Commanding General of the Philippine Army Mariano Adalem had the former US Army Commanding General headquarters converted into the Philippine Army Museum and Library. The Fort Bonifacio Tunnel was also integrated into the museum's exhibits. Both museum and tunnel were inaugurated in 1989. During the 1990s, the museum was relocated when a substantial portion of Fort Bonifacio was converted into the business and residential district now known as Bonifacio Global City.

== Exhibits ==
The static outdoor exhibits include various specimens of decommissioned artillery, tanks and armored personnel carriers. The indoor exhibits include galleries of uniforms, weapons, colors and displays on various Philippine Army campaigns. As of 2018, an addition to the latter features the Battle of Marawi.

== Gallery ==
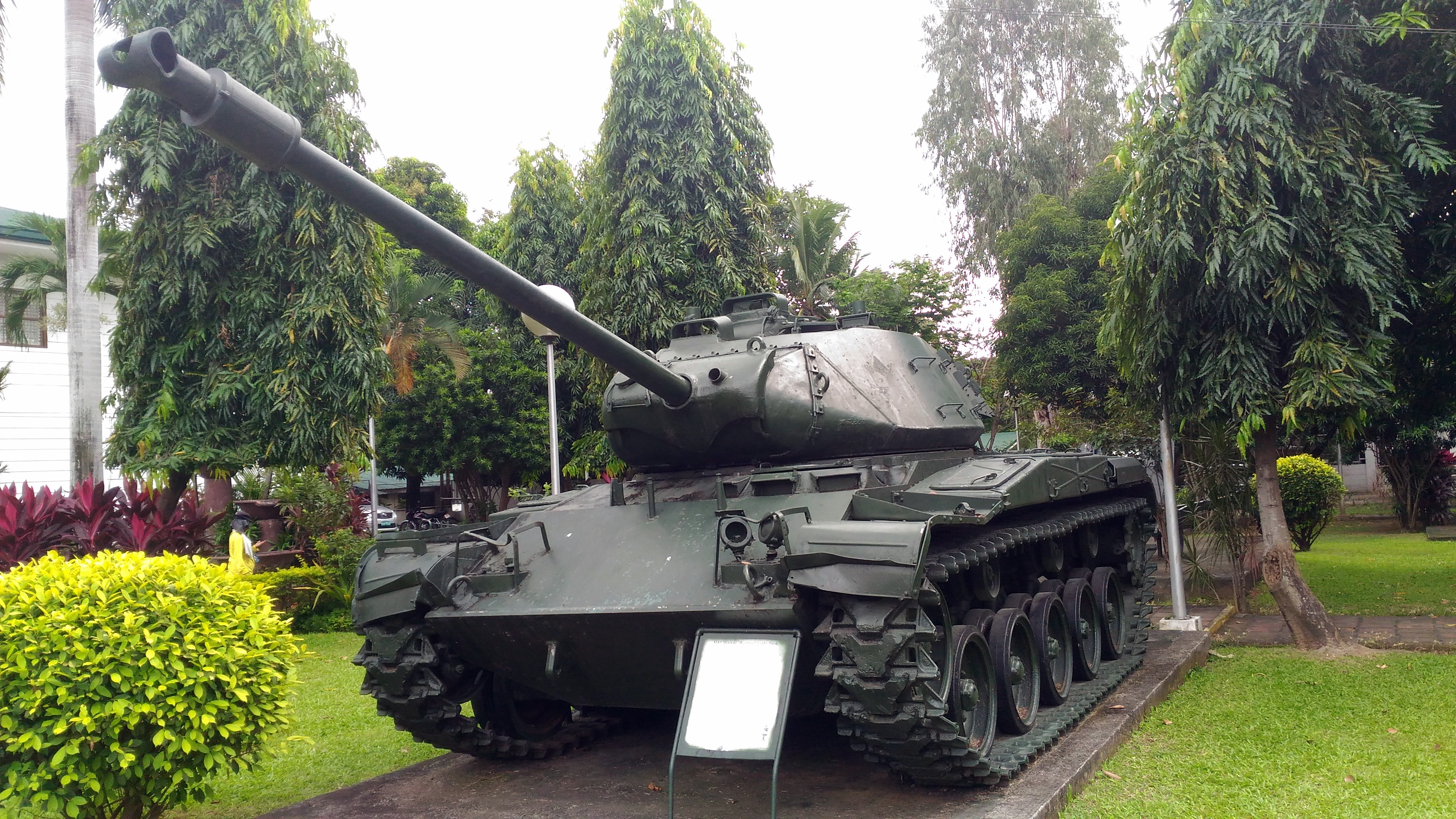
M41 Walker Bulldog

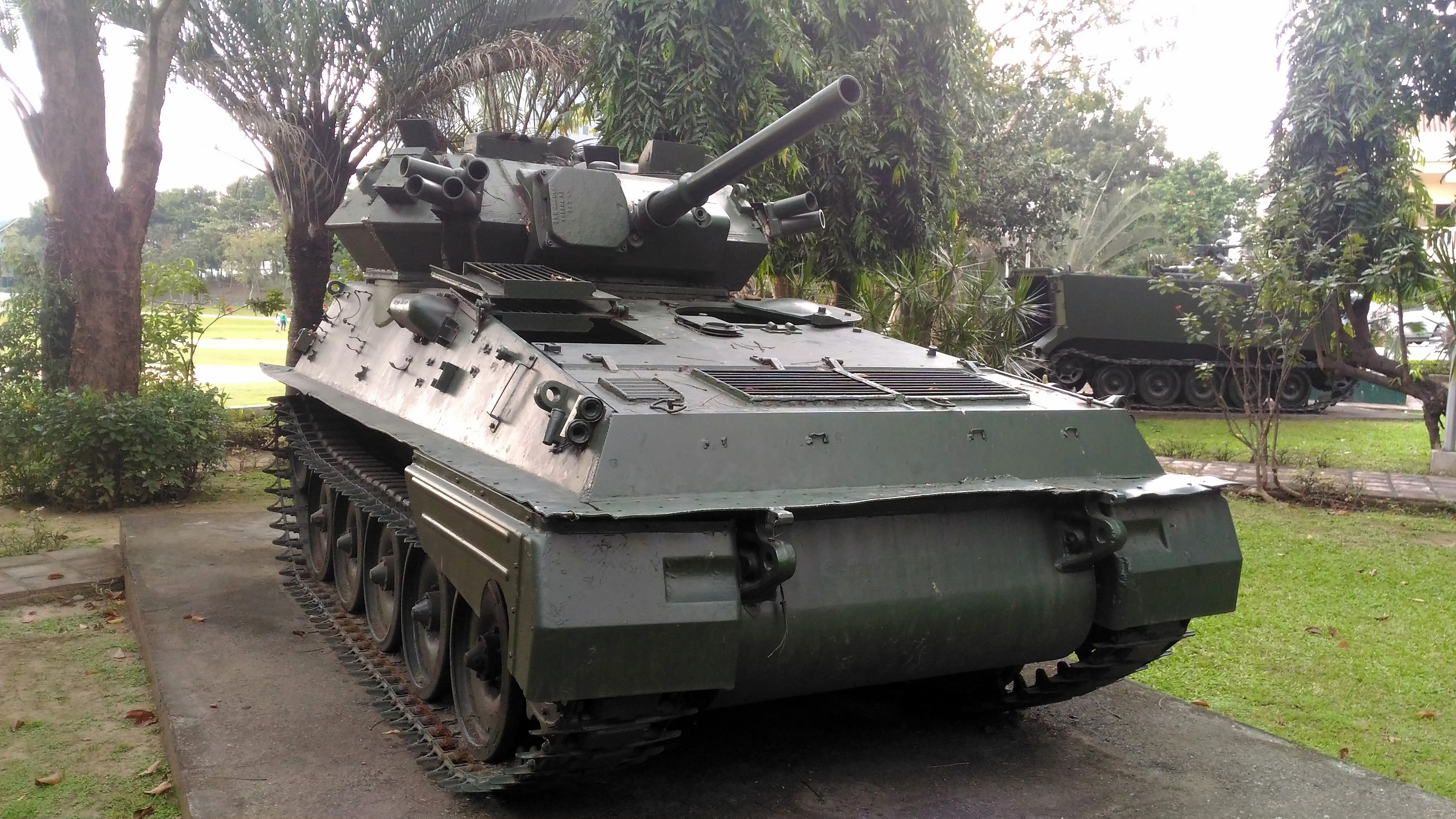
FV101 Scorpion

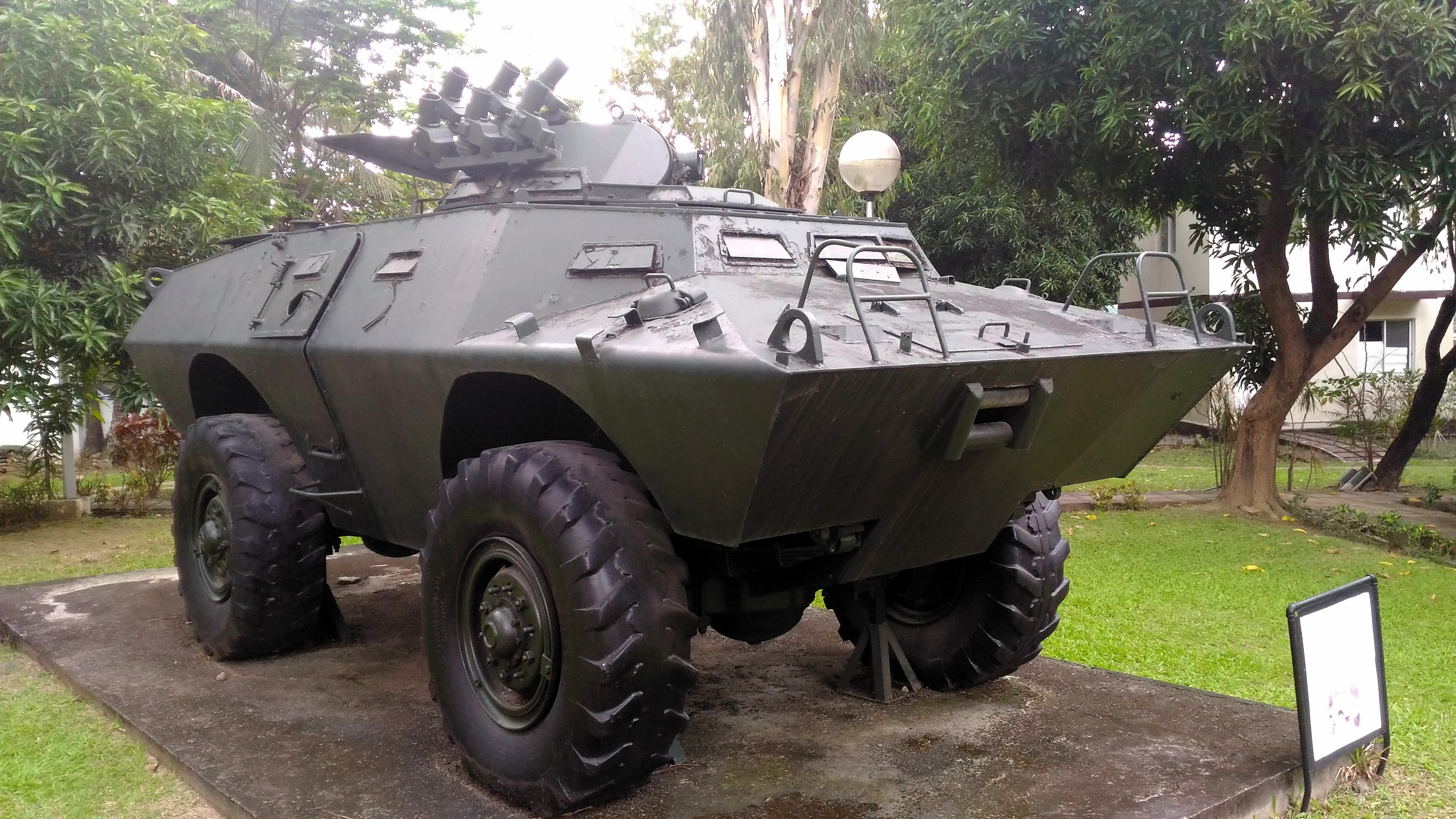
Cadillac Gage Commando

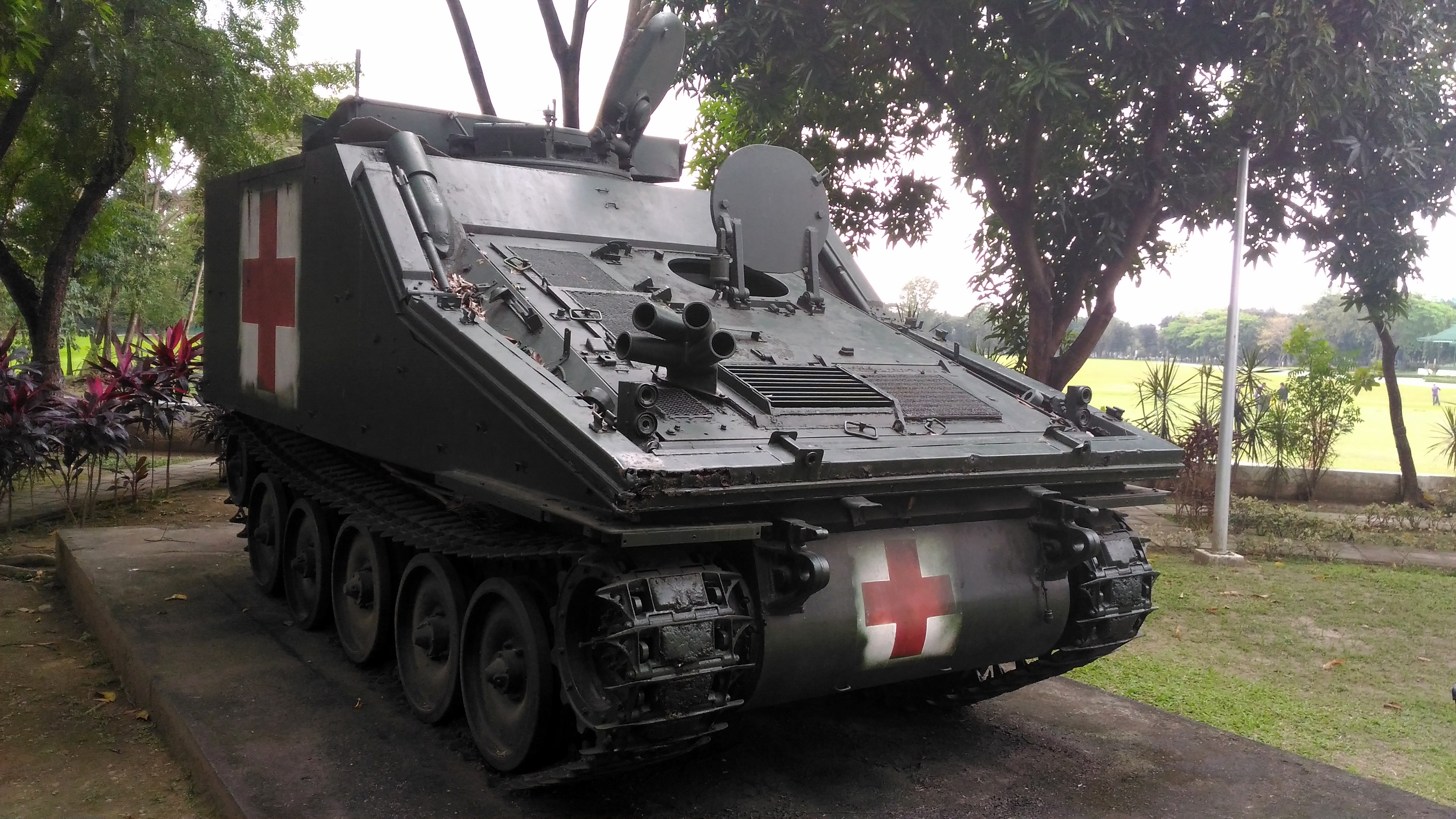
Alvis FV104 Samaritan

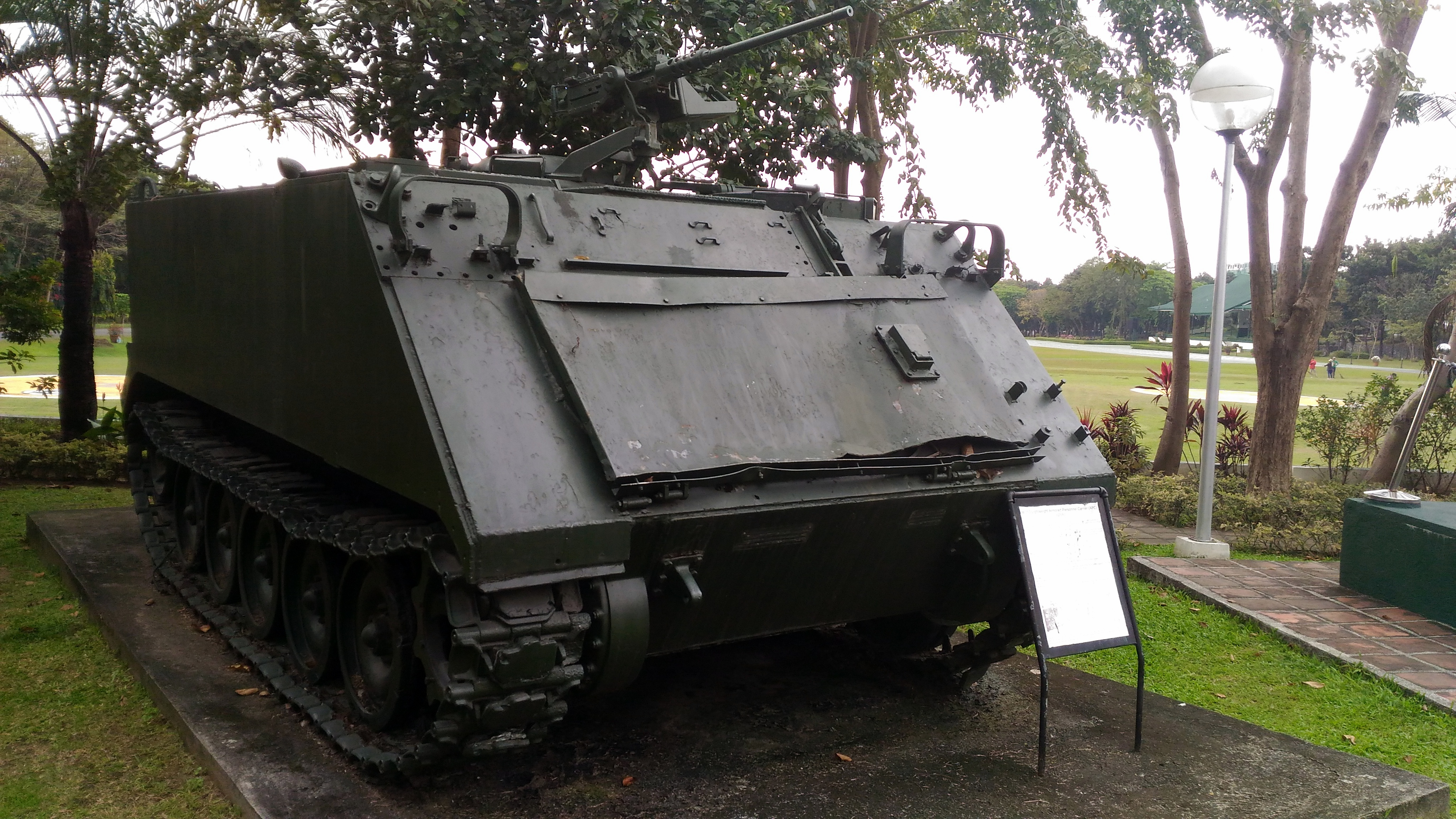
M113 armored personnel carrier

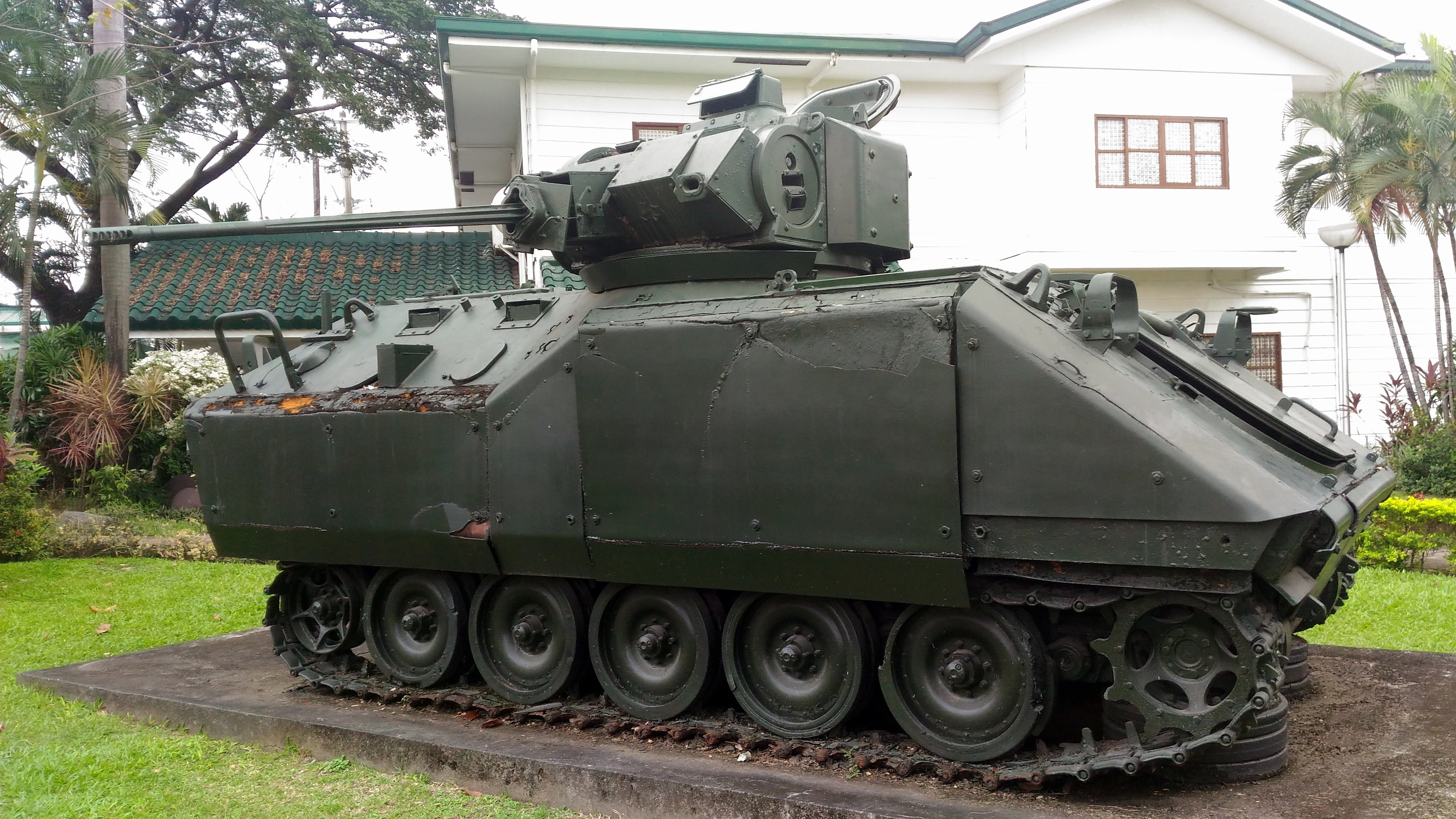
M113 armored infantry fighting vehicle (M113 variant)

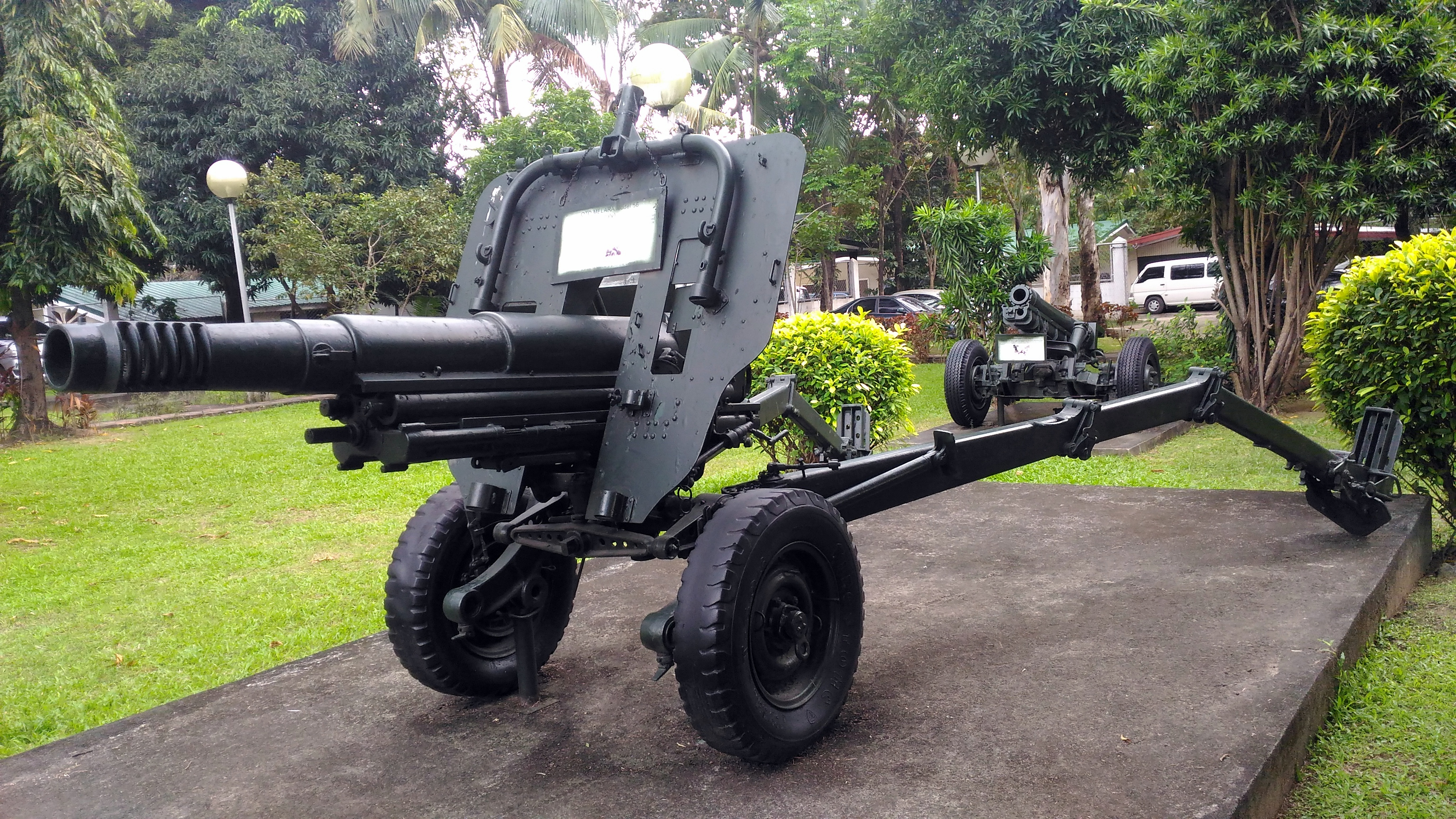
OTO Melara Mod 56

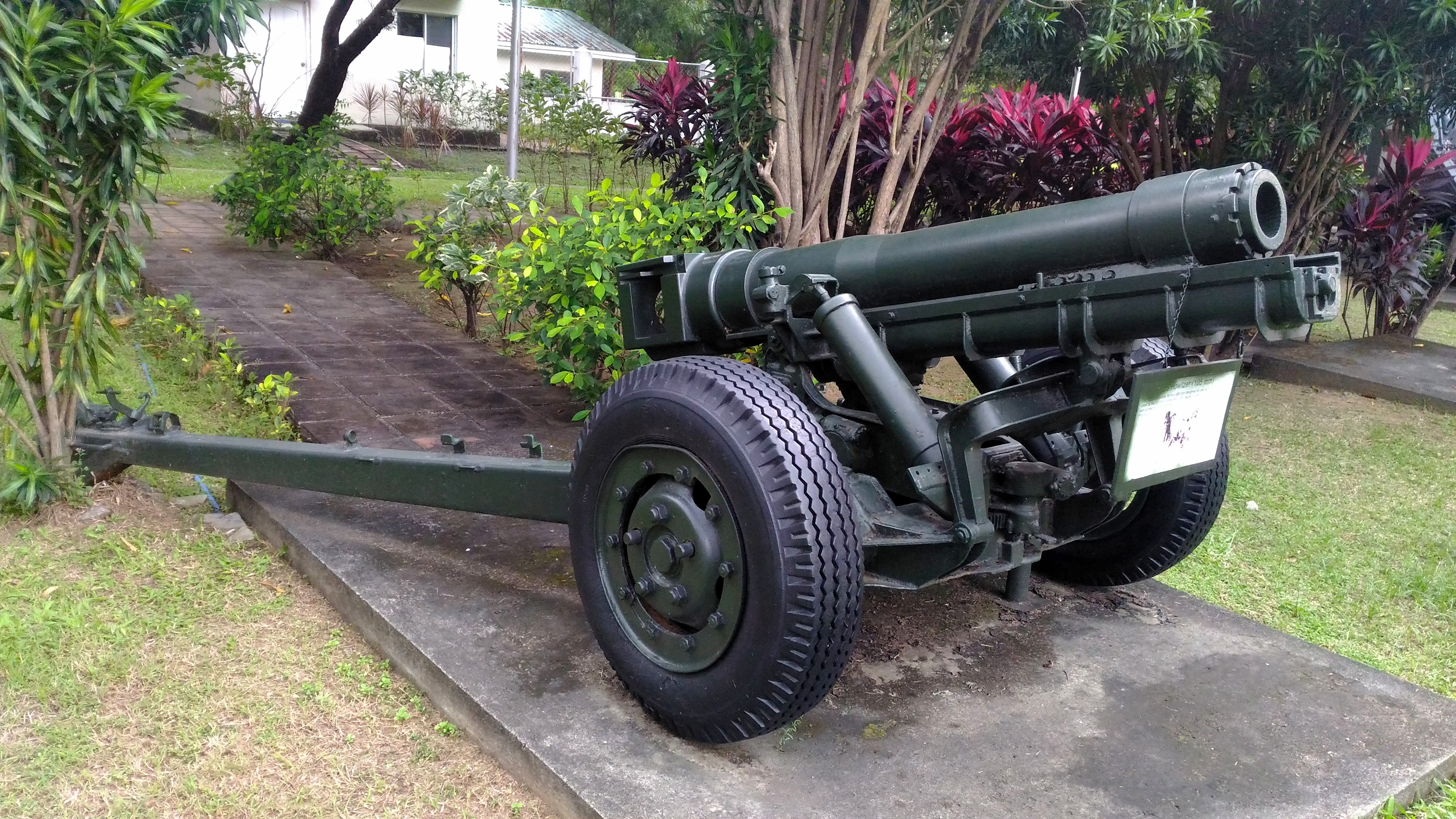
M3 105 mm Light Howitzer

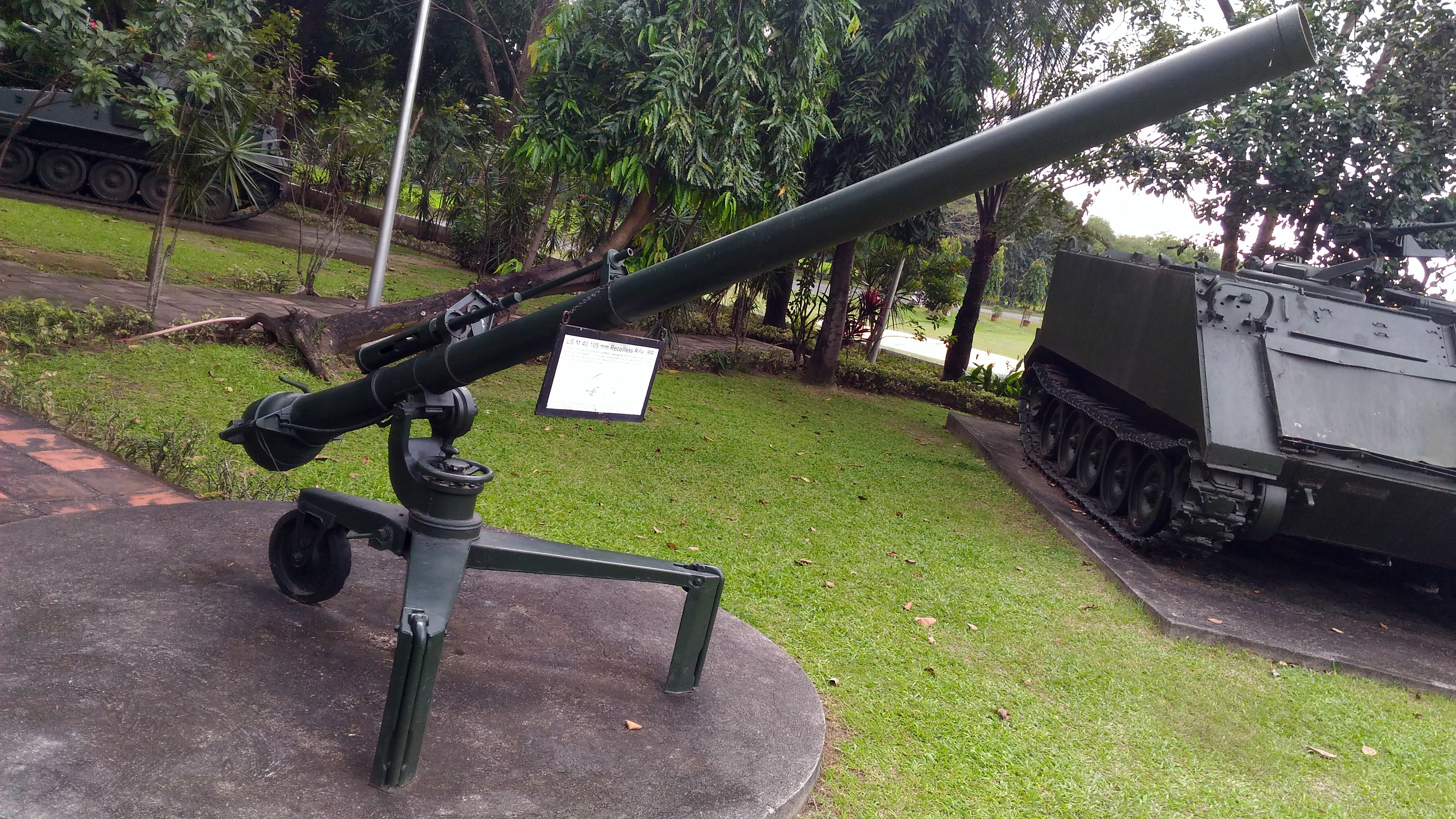
M40 105 mm recoilless rifle

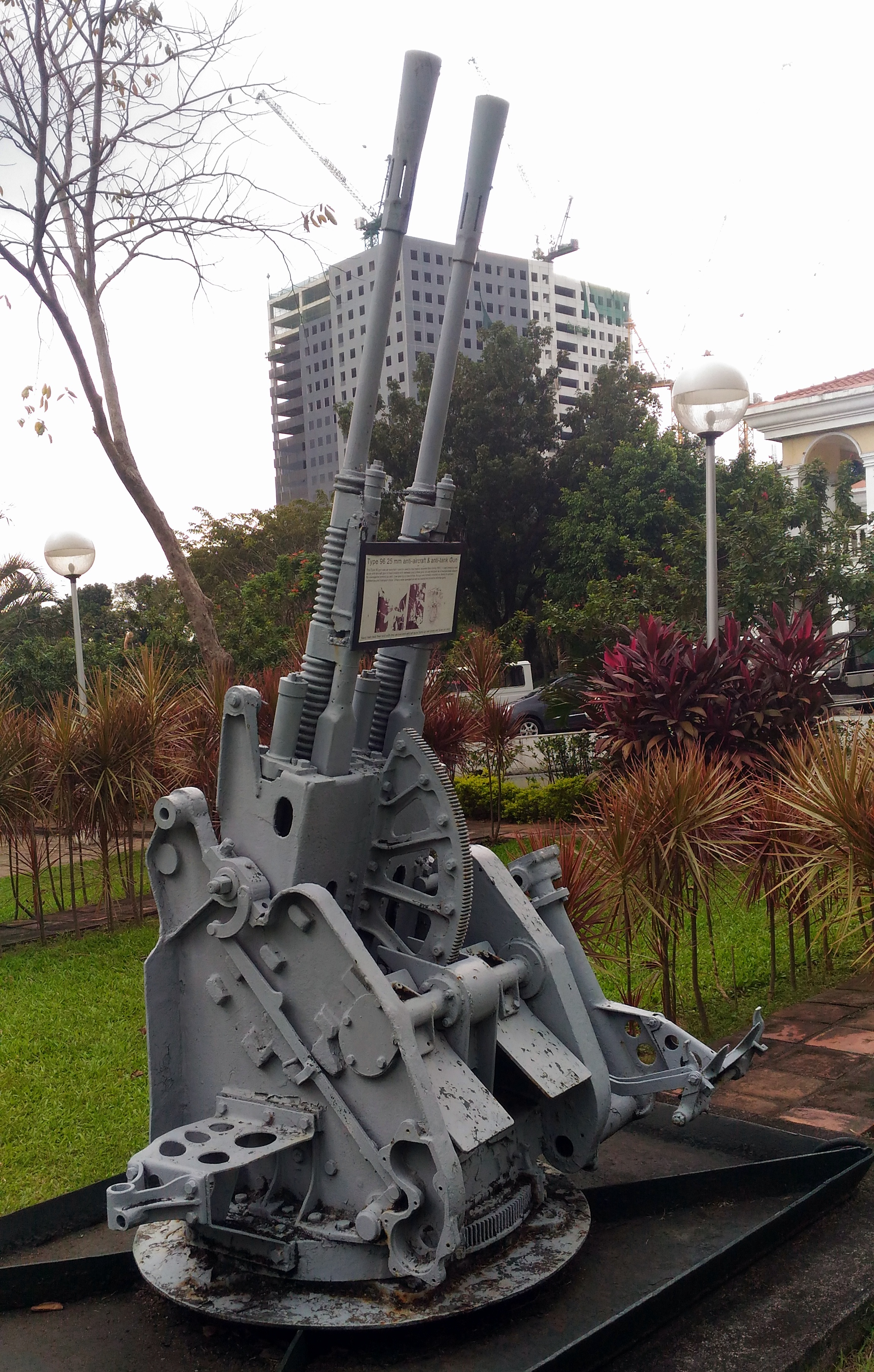
Type 96 25 mm AT/AA Gun

== See also ==
- Armed Forces of the Philippines Museum
- Philippine Air Force Aerospace Museum
