= Philippine Air Force Aerospace Museum =

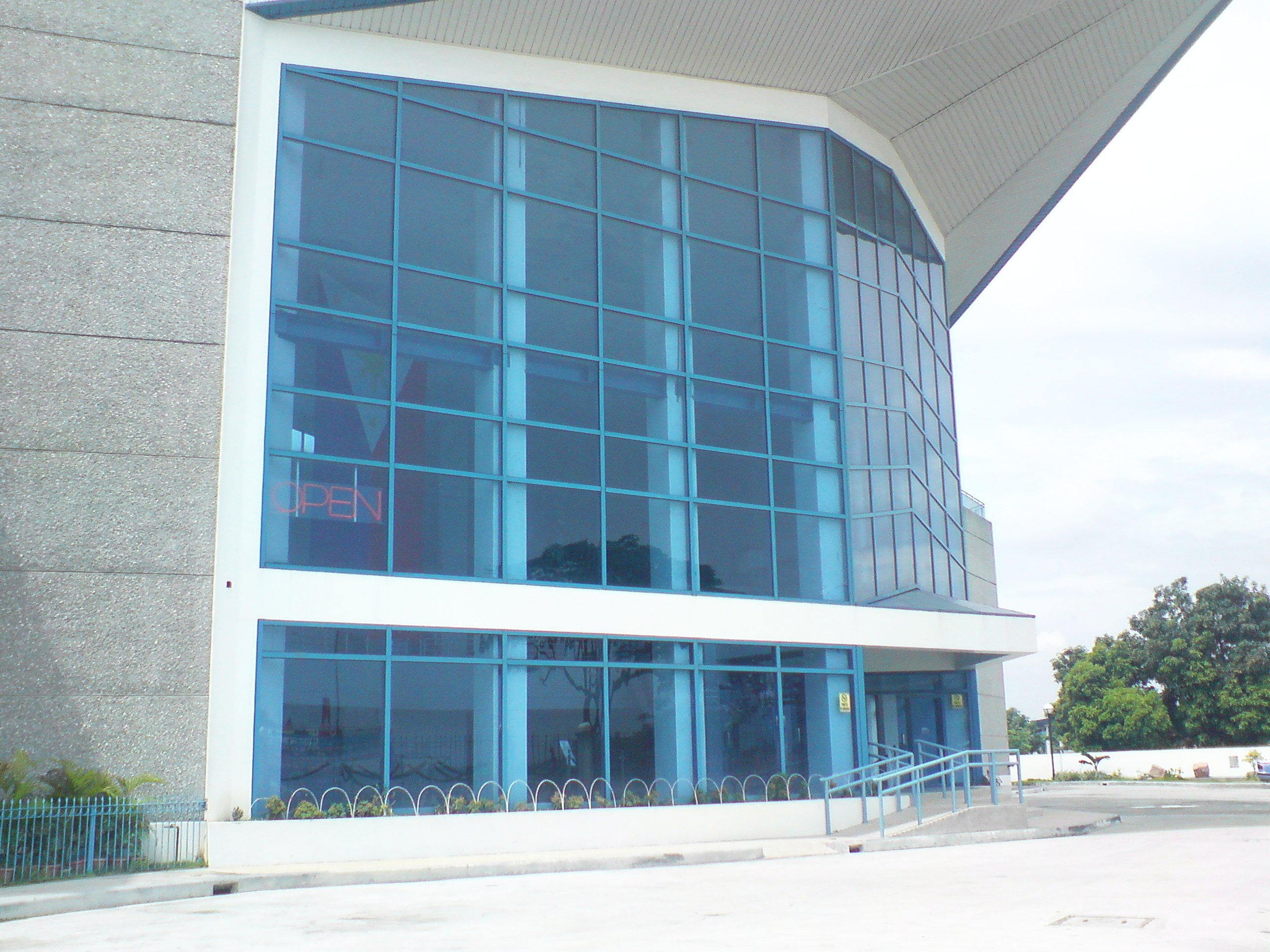
- Philippine Air Force Aerospace Museum facade

- Location within Metro Manila Location within Luzon Location within Philippines
- Former name: Marcos Museum
- Established: May 2, 1974; 52 years ago
- Location: Pasay, Philippines
- Coordinates: 14°30′59″N 121°01′09″E
- Type: Aerospace museum
- Collections: Military aircraft
- Visitors: 35,000 (2009)
- Owner: Philippine Air Force

The Philippine Air Force Aerospace Museum is an aerospace museum located within the premises of Colonel Jesus Villamor Air Base in Pasay, Philippines.

== History ==
The museum was founded as the Marcos Museum on May 2, 1974. The museum at its current location opened in June 2007.

== Exhibits ==
The museum exhibits are divided into several sections. These include a heritage section, a science and technology section, an art corner and the Aircraft Park. The heritage section's collection includes galleries of weapons, uniforms, dioramas, miniatures, and memorabilia related to early Philippine military aviation. Artifacts related to the March 1974 surrender of Japanese holdout Hiroo Onoda, such as his sword, rifle and personal equipment, are on display here. The science and technology exhibits include aircraft mock-ups and miniatures, indoor static aircraft displays and experimental projects of the Philippine Air Force.

When the Balangiga bells were repatriated on 11 December 2018, these were exhibited for public viewing at the museum for two days prior to being returned to Eastern Samar.

The Aircraft Park is an outdoor facility that displays retired aircraft that had been used by the Philippine Air Force throughout its history. The static indoor display and Aircraft Park collection includes the following:

Aircraft on display
Name	Serial No.	Role	Class	Introduced	Country of Origin
Aero Commander 500	11250	Reconnaissance	Propeller	1988	United States
Beechcraft T-34A Mentor	59-07106/506	Trainer	Propeller	1953	United States
Bell UH-1H Iroquois	22570	Utility	Helicopter	1959	United States
Boeing-Stearman N2S-3	551	Trainer	Propeller	1934	United States
Cessna T-41D Mescalero	8958	Trainer	Propeller	1964	United States
Douglas AC-47A Skytrain	48301	Transport	Propeller	1941	United States
Grumman SA-16A Albatross	48607	Amphibious rescue	Propeller	1949	United States
Lockheed T-33A	29806	Trainer	Jet	1948	United States
NAMC YS-11A-523	RP-77	Transport	Turboprop	1965	Japan
North American F-86D Sabre	524140	Interceptor	Jet	1949	United States
North American F-86F Sabre	24468	Fighter	Jet	1949	United States
North American T-6G Texan	150162/662	Trainer	Propeller	1935	United States
North American T-28C Trojan	140533/109	Trainer	Propeller	1949	United States
North American P-51D Mustang	3733/4823	Fighter/Fighter-bomber	Propeller	1942	United States
Northrop F-5A Freedom Fighter	13326/1	Light fighter	Jet	1962	United States
SIAI-Marchetti SF.260	15-39/639 & 15-44/644	Trainer/Light attack	Propeller	1966	Italy
Sikorsky S-62A Sea Guardian	62018	Amphibious rescue	Helicopter	1961	United States
Sikorsky UH-34D Seahorse	153131	Transport	Helicopter	1954	United States
Temco T-160 Cali	44233	Trainer	Jet	1959	United States
Vought F-8D Crusader	147056	Fighter	Jet	1957	United States

== See also ==
- Armed Forces of the Philippines Museum
- Philippine Army Museum
