= Type 96 25 mm AT/AA gun =

Japanese anti-aircraft and anti-tank 25mm autocannon

Type 96 25 mm dual purpose gun
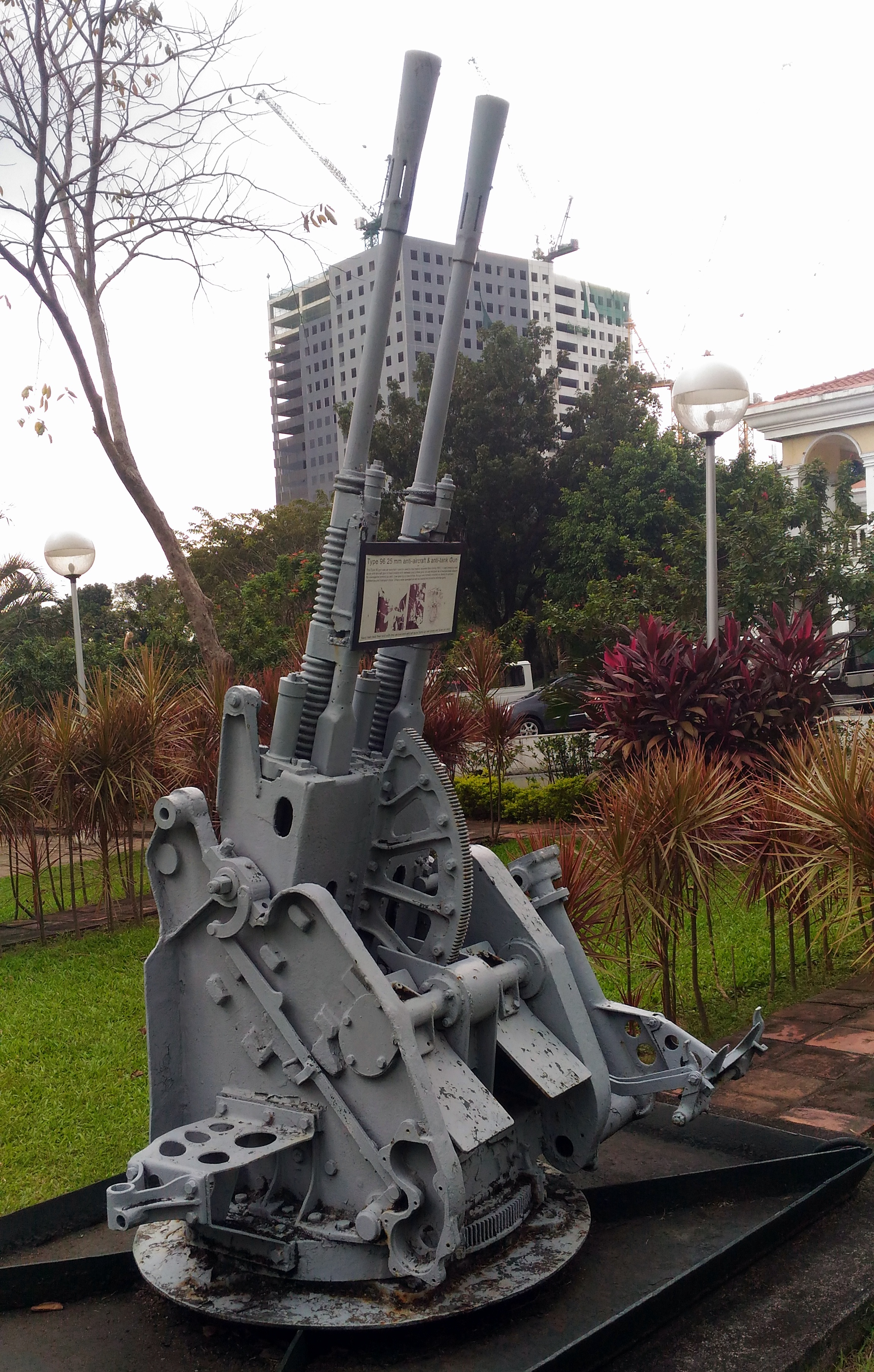
- Type 96 25 mm AA gun at the Philippine Army Museum
- Type: Anti-Aircraft/Anti-tank, Autocannon
- Place of origin: Empire of Japan

Service history
- In service: 1936–1945
- Used by: Imperial Japanese Navy
- Wars: World War II; Chinese Civil War; Indonesian National Revolution; Malayan Emergency; Korean War; First Indochina War; Vietnam War

Production history
- Designer: Hotchkiss
- Designed: 1935
- No. built: 33,000

Specifications
- Mass: Single barrel: 785 kg (1,731 lb); Twin barrel: 1,100 kg (2,400 lb); Triple barrel: 1,800 kg (4,000 lb)
- Barrel length: 1.5 m (4 ft 11 in) L/60
- Crew: 9, 7 or 3 depending on number of barrels
- Shell: 25×163mm
- Caliber: 25 mm (0.98 in)
- Action: Gas operated
- Elevation: -10° to +85°
- Traverse: 360°
- Rate of fire: 200–260 rpm (cyclic); 110 rpm (effective)
- Muzzle velocity: 820 m/s (2,700 ft/s)
- Effective firing range: 6.8 km (4.2 mi) at 45° with HE shell
- Maximum firing range: 3 km (9,800 ft) (effective); 5.5 km (18,000 ft) (maximum)
- Feed system: 15-round box magazine

The Type 96 25 mm gun (九六式二十五粍高角機銃, Kyūroku-shiki nijyūgo-miri Kōkakukijū) was an automatic cannon used by the Imperial Japanese Navy during World War II. A locally-built variant of the French Hotchkiss 25 mm anti-aircraft gun, it was designed as a dual-purpose weapon for use against armored vehicles and aircraft, but was primarily used as an anti-aircraft gun in fixed mounts with one to three guns.

== History and development ==
In 1935 the Imperial Japanese Navy decided to replace the earlier 40 mm Vickers "pom-pom" guns with a 25 mm Hotchkiss design. A party of Japanese officers and engineers traveled to France to evaluate the design in 1935, and an order was placed for a number of guns and mounts for evaluation. Firing tests of these guns were conducted at Yokosuka Naval Arsenal in 1935. The first few weapons were built in France under the designation Type 94 and Type 95, with the mass production model produced at the Yokosuka Arsenal being designated Type 96.

The Japanese made a number of minor changes to the original Hotchkiss design and production process, changing some components from forgings to castings to simplify production, and replacing the simple conical flash suppressor with a Rheinmetall-type design. A submarine-mountable version of the gun which made extensive use of stainless steel was also produced.

The double-mount type was the first to enter service, with triple mounts following in 1941 and finally single mounts later in 1943.

== Design ==
The Type 96 25 mm gun is a simple air-cooled gas operated design. The barrel is a forging screwed into the breech mechanism. Additional support is provided to the breech end of the gun barrel by the finned cooling jacket. The barrel is changeable, requiring two men and special tools; the operation took a trained crew approximately five minutes. By adjusting the gas valve setting it was possible to vary the rate of fire between 200 and 260 rounds per minute, with 220 rounds per minute being the standard setting.

The gun mounts were normally provided with one of three gun sights:

- A Le Prieur mechanical lead computing sight
- An open ring sight
- An etched glass optical ring sight

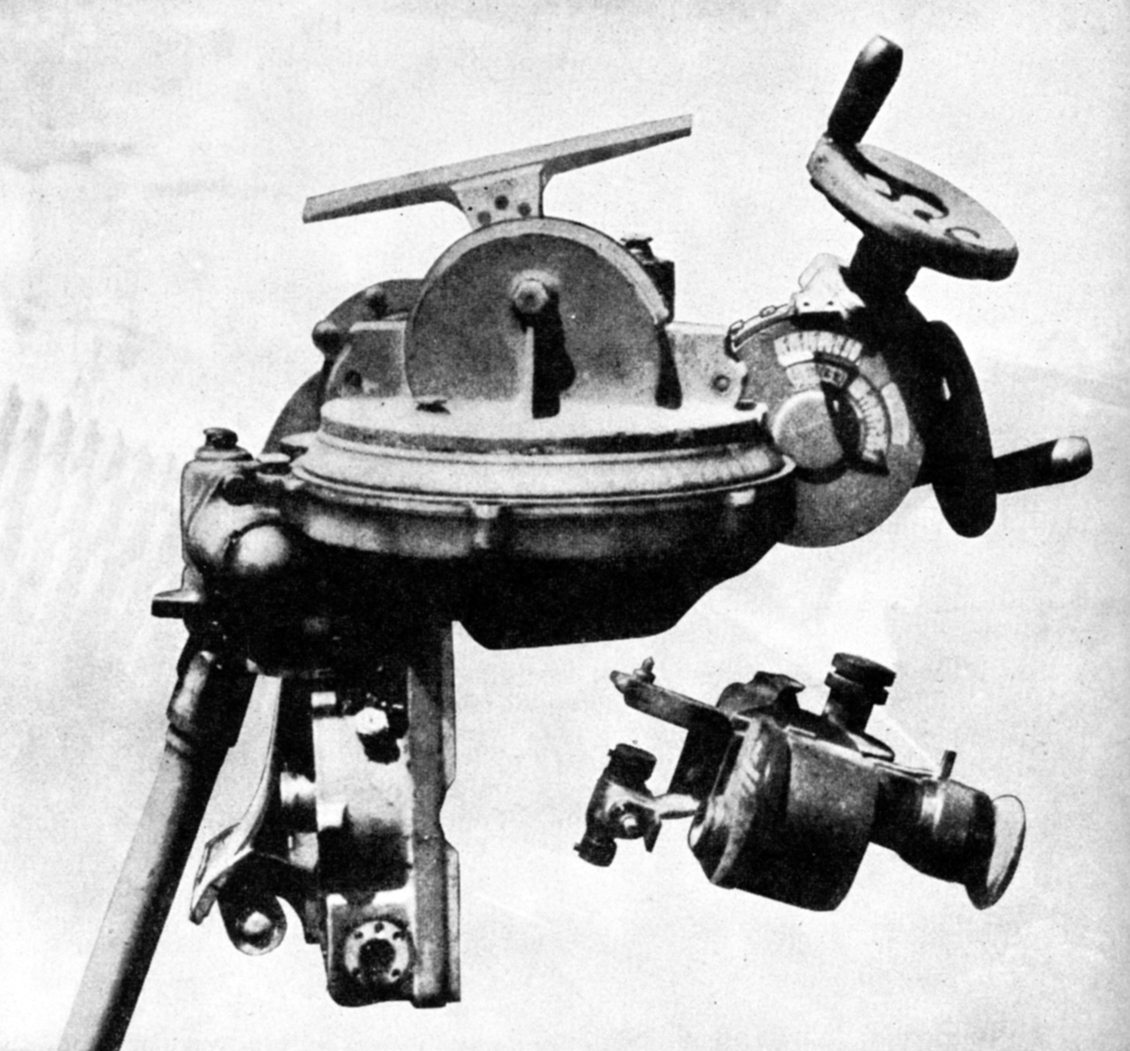
A Le Prieur mechanical lead computing sight

Land mountings and all single mountings all used the single open-ring sight. The Type 95 sight was used on ship-based multiple mounts, in the case where the mount has a powered drive linked to a fire director it was used as a backup.

The Type 95 sight was originally designed with a maximum target speed of 600 km/h (370 mph); however, experience showed that aircraft often exceeded this speed. To compensate for the problem, a ring was added to the sighting telescope to provide an additional offset for speeds up to 900 km/h (560 mph).

The gun was normally used without a gun shield, although some multiple mounts on Yamato-class battleships were fitted with Ducol high tensile steel shields. Many ship-based mounts also had splinter shields.

=== Ammunition ===
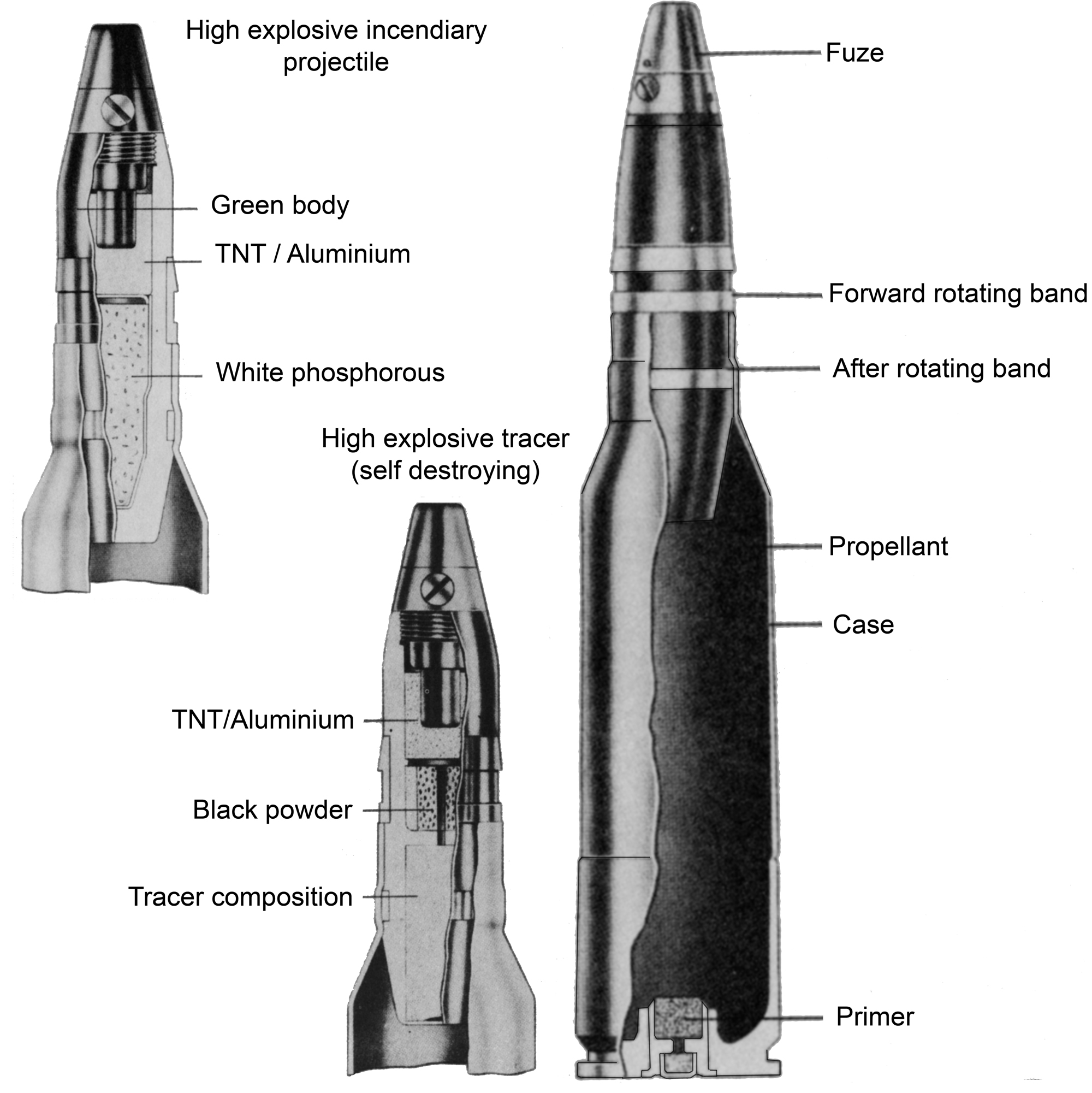
Japanese 25 mm ammunition from a post-war US technical manual

The Type 96 cartridge case was a rimless type design with a deep extraction groove at the base. The projectiles fired by the weapon were slightly unusual in that they had two rotating bands. The forward band was slightly smaller in diameter than the rear band. It was believed that this was to reduce wear on the rifling near the chamber. The case of the cartridge was crimped around the rear rotating band. The complete round weighed approximately 820 g (1.81 lb) with the projectile weighing 320 g (0.71 lb).

The propellant was 102 grams of single-perforated, graphited grains of nitrocellulose approximately 2 mm in diameter and between 2.5 and 4.5 mm in length.

Normally one tracer round was added every four or five rounds to aid laying.

- High-explosive shell. Orange body.
- High explosive incendiary. Green body.
- High explosive tracer. Orange or red body.
- High explosive tracer self-destroying. Orange or red body.
- Armor-piercing. Black, white or smoky blue body. Approx 42 mm penetration at 0–100 m and 0 degrees from normal.

== Variants ==
- Type 94 – French built
- Type 95 – French built
- Type 96 – Built in Japan
  - Type 96 Model 1 – Used on land and in warships in single, double and triple mountings (also known as double 25 and triple 25). The single mount was free swinging, while double and triple mounts had hand-wheel traverse.
  - Type 96 Model 2 – Used on warships in double and triple mountings.
  - Type 96 Model 3 – Used on warships in single free-swinging mounts.
  - Type 96 Model 4 – Used on submarines, in single, double and triple mounts. Single mounts can be manually lowered into the submarine.
    - Type 96 Model 4 mod 1 – Used on submarines in free-swinging single mounts. Could not be lowered into the submarine.
    - Type 96 Model 4 mod 2 – Used on submarines in free-swinging single mounts. Could be remotely lowered into the submarine.
  - Type 96 Model 5 – Used on submarines in twin and triple geared mounts.
  - Type 96 Model 6 – Used on land on single gun twin wheel carriages.
  - Type 96 Model 8 – Used on land on single gun twin wheel carriages.
  - Type 96 Model 10 – Used on torpedo boats on a ring mounting with geared elevation in single gun mounts.

== Combat record ==
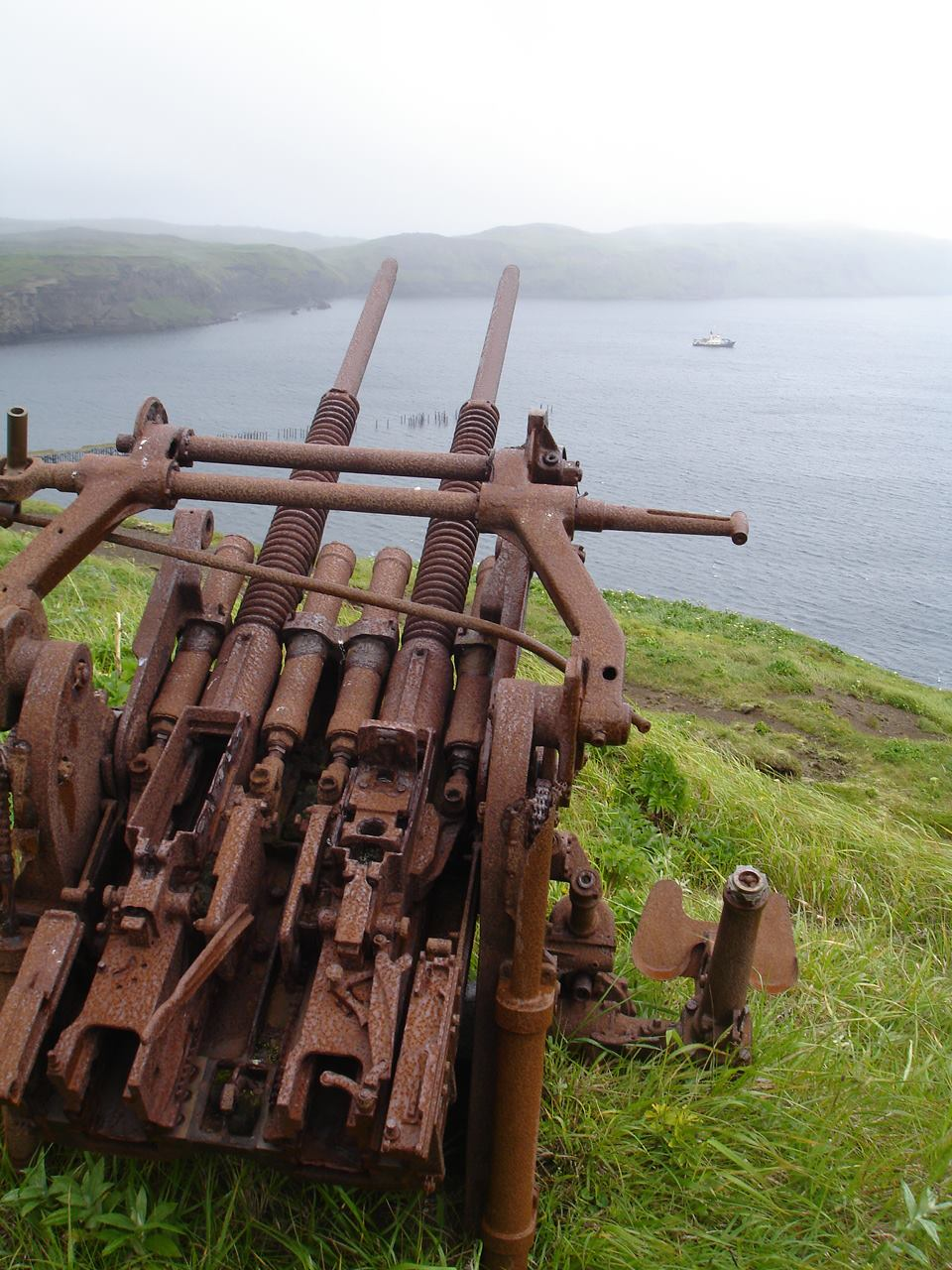
Gun left behind at the end of the occupation of Kiska Island in Alaska

The Type 96 was the standard Japanese medium anti-aircraft weapon of the Imperial Japanese Navy, being mounted aboard practically every ship in the fleet. The gun was also used in land bases in the Japanese Empire and in the Japanese overseas combat fronts. These weapons were also used as anti-tank guns in some defensive actions in Pacific theaters and against land objectives in southeast Asia and mainland China during the Pacific War. The gun was used by the Viet Cong during the Vietnam War. It was also used by the Bougainville Revolutionary Army during the Bougainville Civil War which lasted from 1988 to 1998.

== Effectiveness ==
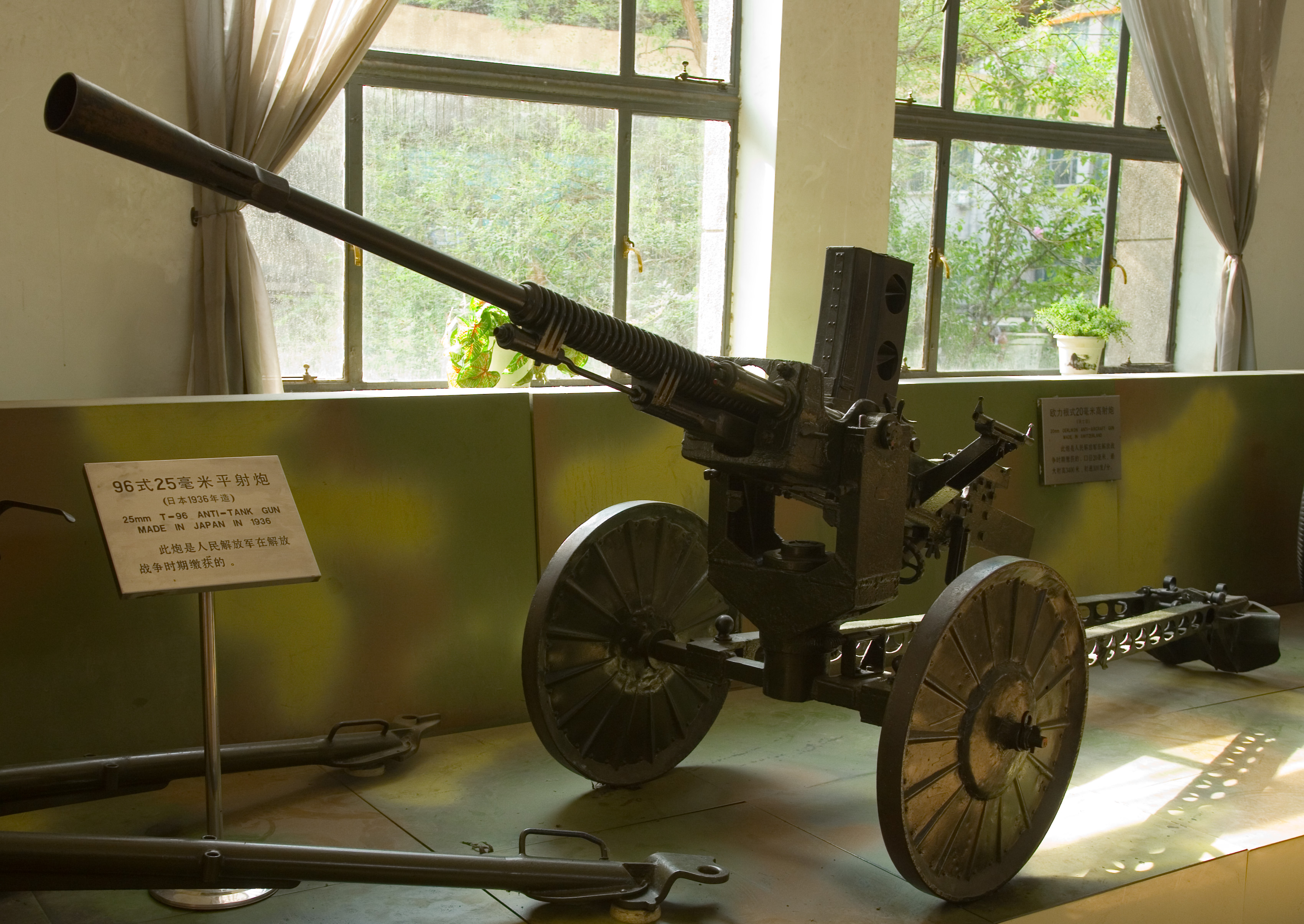
A single barreled variant at the China People's Revolution Military Museum, Beijing

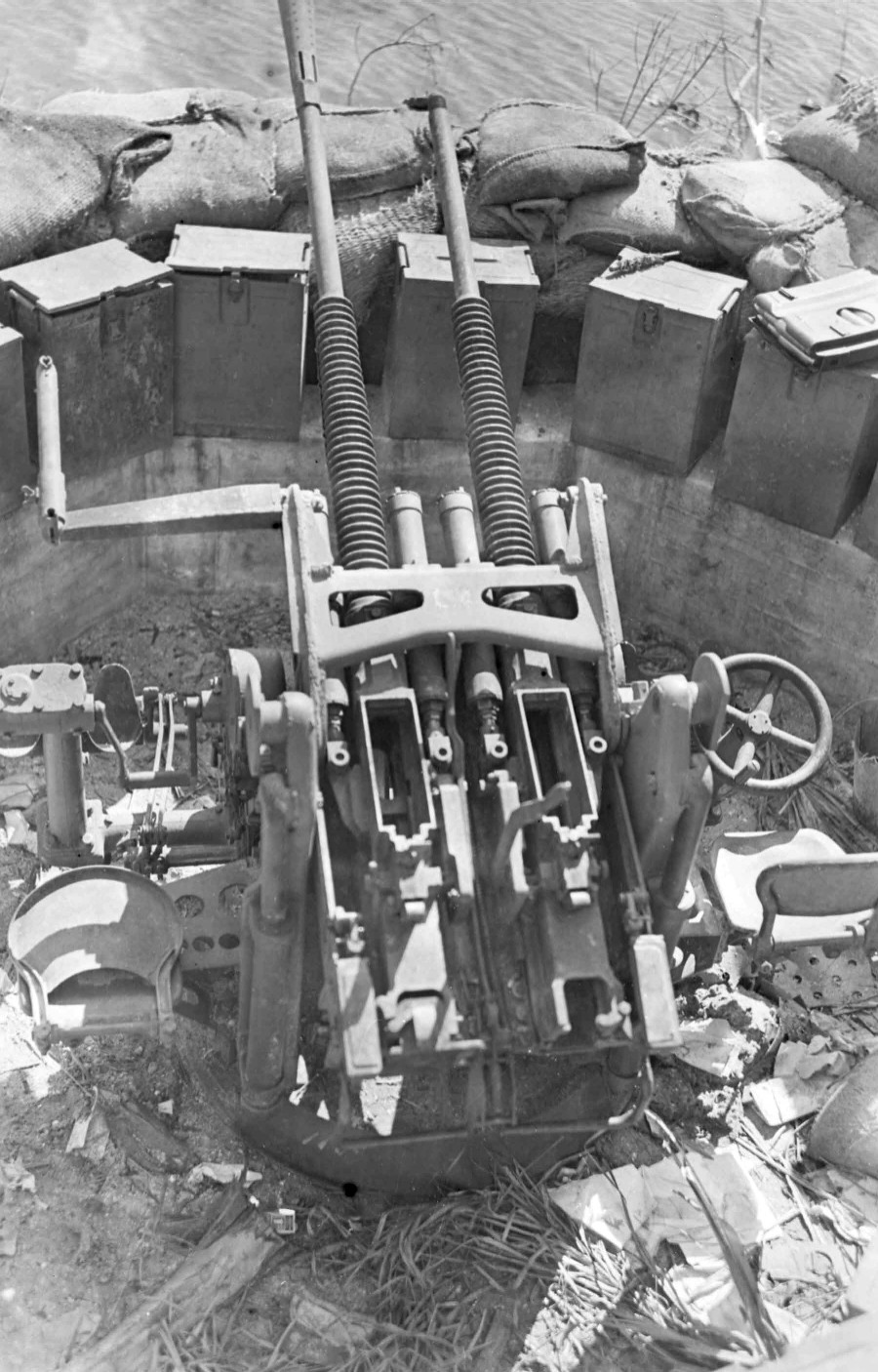
A US military photograph of a captured dual gun emplacement on Guam in 1944

In interviews conducted by the U.S. Naval Technical Mission to Japan after the end of the war, Japanese military personnel said it was the most reliable Japanese anti-aircraft weapon, but second in effectiveness to the 100 mm (3.9 in) Type 98 anti-aircraft gun. The Type 96 was most effective when used at ranges of 1,000 meters or less. The Japanese military estimated that it required an average of 1,500 rounds to shoot down an aircraft at a height of 1,000 meters and a range of 2,000 meters, and that fire beyond that range was completely ineffective. Later in the war, when ammunition supply was restricted, firing was held until the targets were within 800 meters range, dropping this ratio to as low as seven rounds per aircraft.

The Type 96 was a mediocre weapon compared to its contemporaries in other navies. It was hampered by slow training and elevating speeds (even in power-operated triple mounts), excessive vibration and muzzle flash, and that the ammunition feed was via a 15-round fixed magazine, which necessitated ceasing fire every time the magazine had to be changed. According to "US Naval Technical Mission to Japan report O-47(N)-2", all magazines had to be loaded by hand as no specialized loading equipment was ever developed. Overall, it was more comparable to the 20 mm Oerlikon, though vastly inferior to the 40 mm Bofors weapons used by the US and allies in every respect except rate of fire (and only barely in that respect: the Bofors could put out a sustained 120 rounds per minute because of its constant-fire top-fed ammo clip design, whereas the 25 mm's frequent ammo box changes lowered its nominal rate of fire to only half of its theoretical maximum of 260 rounds per minute).

The Japanese ranked in order of seriousness the problems with the gun as:

- Elevation and traverse were too slow, even with powered mounts
- The sights were ineffective against high speed targets
- Firing the multiple mounts caused excessive vibration, which reduced accuracy and prevented effective target tracking
- Too little ammunition in each magazine resulted in a low overall rate of fire

In Rapid Fire, Anthony Williams writes that the intermediate caliber weapons (including the US Navy's 1.1-inch/75-caliber gun 28×199mm L/75) were relatively unsuccessful during World War II: the mounts were much heavier and more complex than smaller calibre guns, but the shells lacked the range and hitting power of the larger 37 and 40 millimeter weapons. The Japanese viewed increasing the caliber of autocannons as the number one priority of research and development in the field.

== See also ==
- 25 mm automatic air defense gun M1940 (72-K)
- Bofors 25 mm M/32 25 mm variant of the Bofors 40 mm gun
