= Armed Forces of the Philippines Museum =

- Established: November 1996
- Location: Camp Aguinaldo, Quezon City, Philippines
- Coordinates: 14°36′40″N 121°03′43″E
- Type: Military history museum
- Owners: AFP Museum and Historical Library Foundation Inc.

The Armed Forces of the Philippines Museum, also known as the AFP Museum, is a military museum located within the premises of Camp Aguinaldo in Quezon City, Philippines.

== History ==
Established in November 1996 through a "verbal pronouncement" by then Chief of Staff of the Armed Forces of the Philippines Arturo Enrile, the museum is located in the building named after Gen. Enrile at Camp Aguinaldo. The following year, a group of individuals from the military and private sector established the AFP Museum and Historical Library Foundation Inc., a non-stock, nonprofit private foundation in order to ensure the continuity of the museum's activities; hence, the museum does not directly operate under the Armed Forces of the Philippines. The Philippine Veterans Affairs Office regularly supports the museum's projects. On December 20, 2024, President Bongbong Marcos led the launching of the renovated museum.

== Exhibits ==
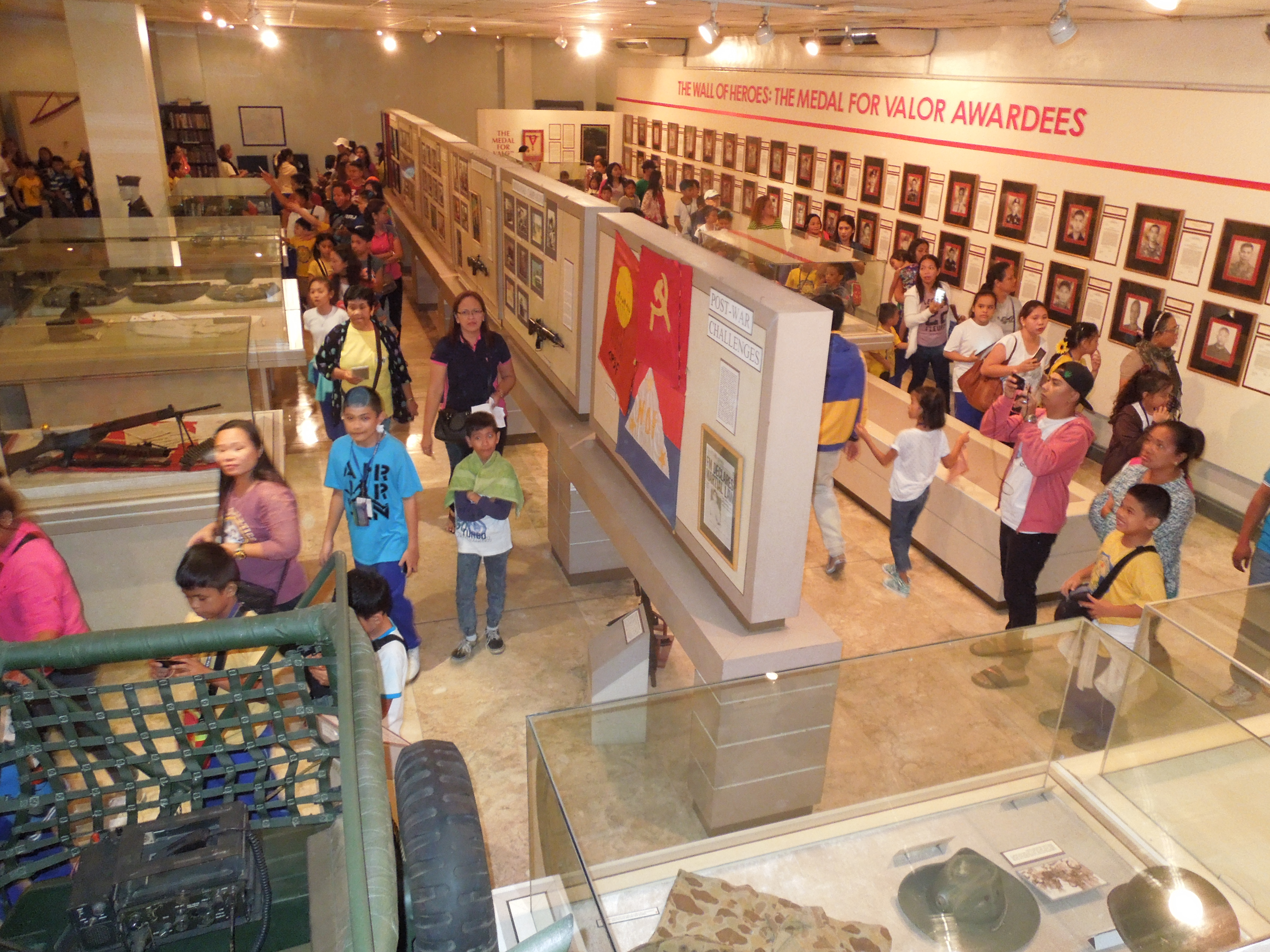
Visitors file past the "Wall of Heroes" displaying the photographs of recipients of the Medal of Valor

The museum consists of two storeys of the Gen. Arturo Enrile building and the adjacent Kagitingan (Filipino, "bravery" or "valor") Park. The lower level showcases the development of the Philippine military through different eras of its history. The upper level consists of displays dedicated to the Philippine Army, Philippine Navy (including the Philippine Marine Corps) and the Philippine Air Force. The Kagitingan Park is used to display decommissioned military vehicles and weapons.

Notable among the museum's collections are two letters written by Apolinario Mabini to Emilio Aguinaldo concerning Antonio Luna. One of the letters, dated February 28, 1899, stated that Luna had renounced his position as Director of War Operations due to Aguinaldo's failure to censure officers who refused to obey his orders. The other, dated March 6, 1899, disclosed that Luna had published a circular order stating that he would execute anyone who refused to obey his orders. Mabini also states in this letter that Luna had executed someone in Bocaue, Bulacan without benefit of a court-martial. Aguinaldo's rayadillo uniform is also in the museum's collection.

A wall display showcasing recipients of the Medal of Valor was inaugurated by former President Fidel V. Ramos in 2011.

== Gallery ==
Items on display at the museum include the following:

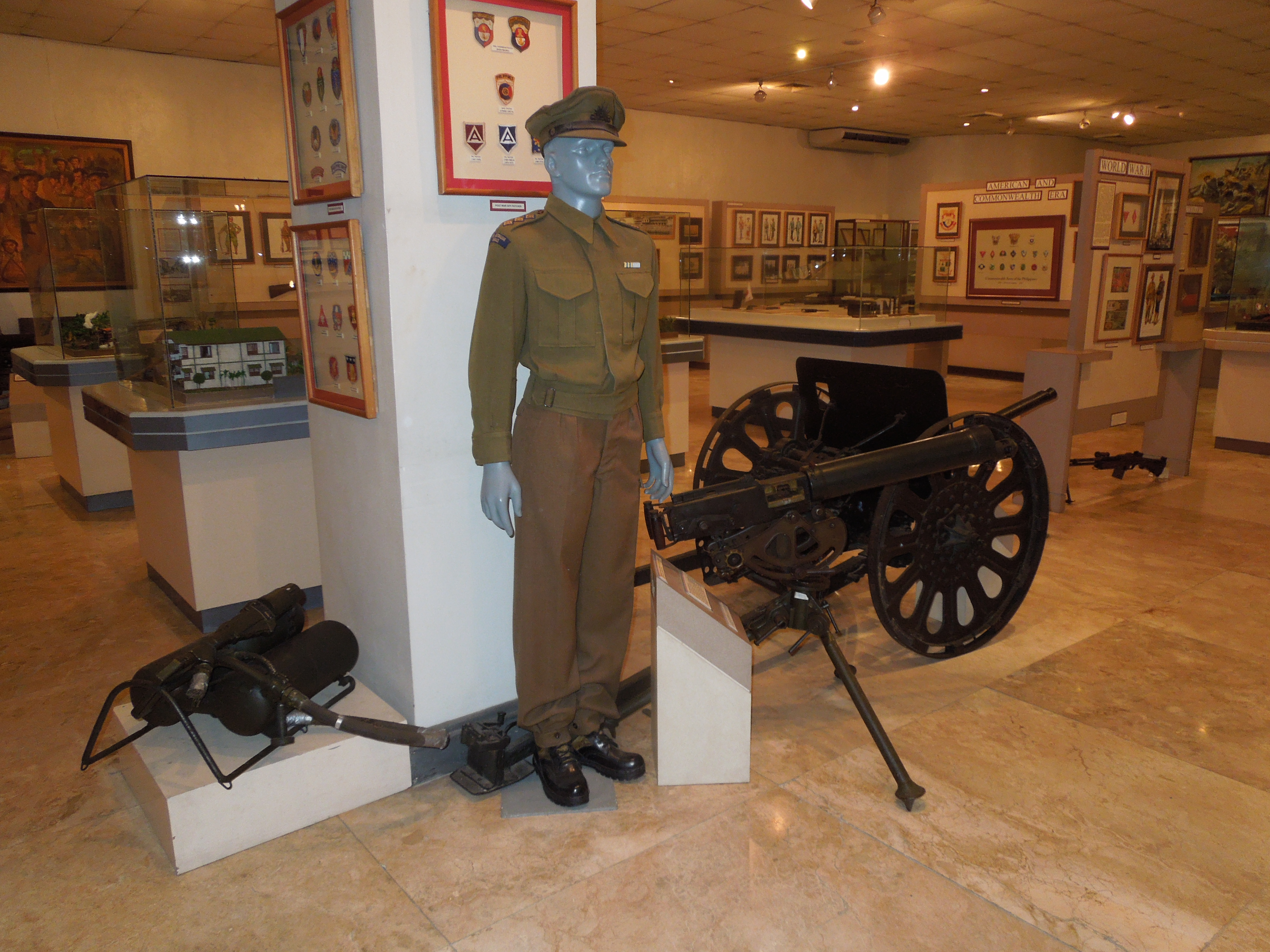
World War II-era weaponry and uniforms

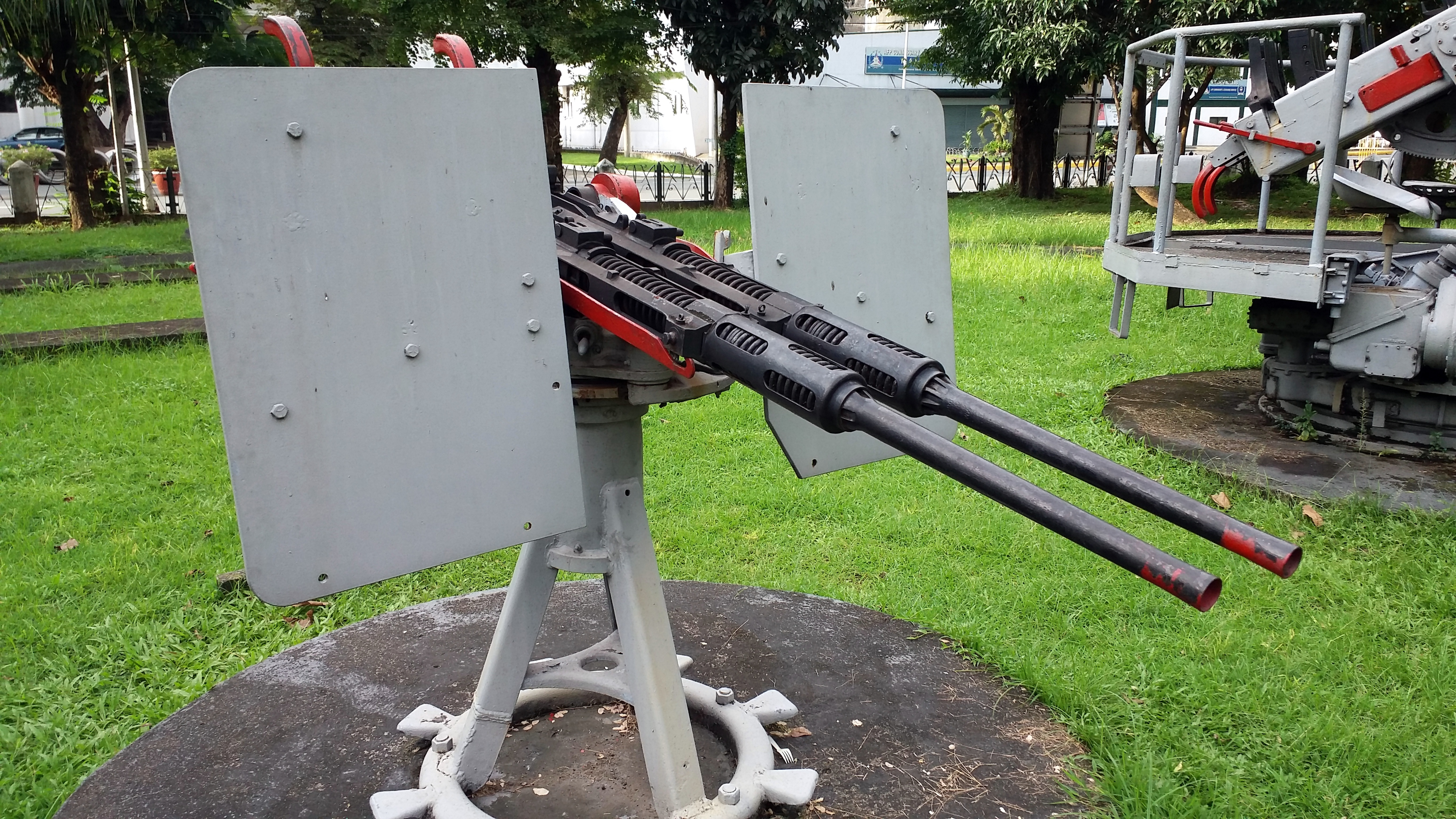
Twin Oerlikon 20 mm cannon

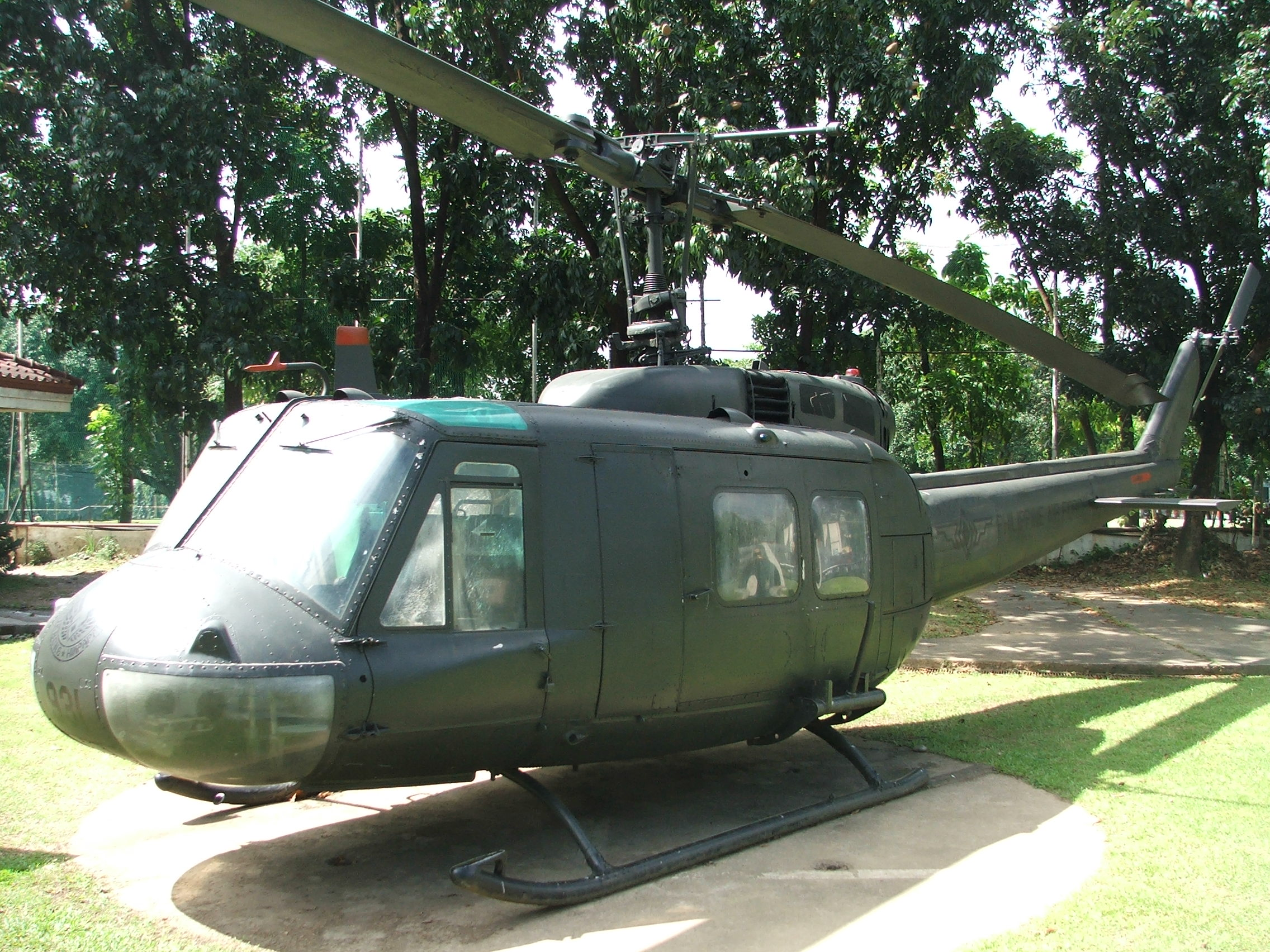
Bell UH-1 Iroquois

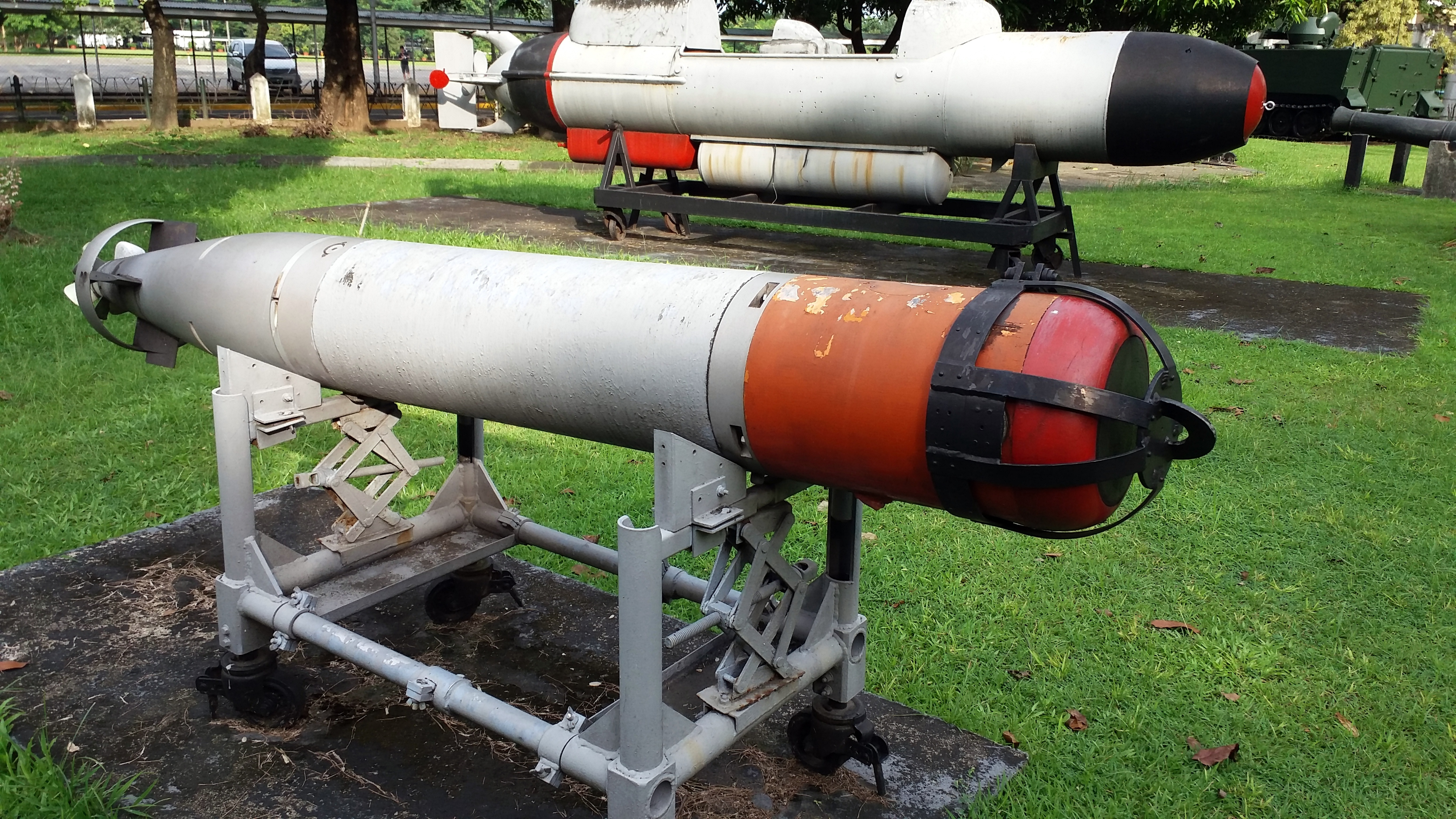
Mark 44 torpedo

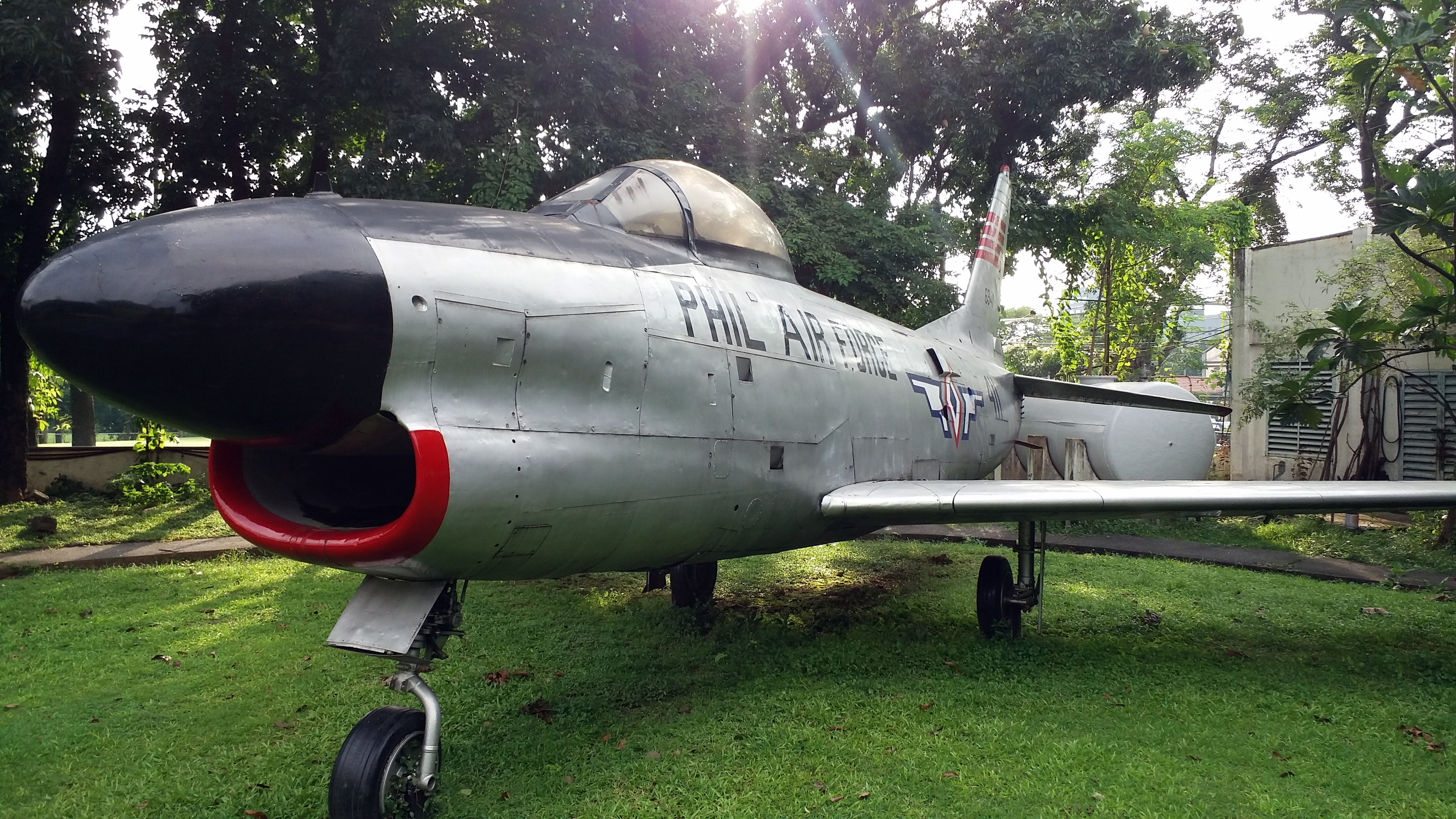
North American F-86D Sabre

== See also ==
- Philippine Air Force Aerospace Museum
- Philippine Army Museum
