= Fort Bonifacio Tunnel =

- Taguig

Site information
- Condition: Not used by the military, under renovation for conversion to a museum

Site history
- Built: 1936
- Battles/wars: World War II

The 1910 Fort Bonifacio War Memorial Tunnel is a tunnel that was part of Fort William McKinley (renamed Fort Bonifacio), a military base built by the US Military Government of the Philippines in 1902. The tunnel alignment is now part of Taguig's Bonifacio Global City district and the Embo barangays, and is considered a historical site by the Bases Conversion Development Authority (BCDA). The main roads near it are C-5 and Kalayaan Avenue.

== History ==
The tunnel was initially used as a passageway for military supplies and war materials. It was first constructed around 1936 with the help of Igorots. It stretches 2.24 kilometres (1.39 mi) at an average depth of 70 feet (21 m) that spans from the Pasig River, to the area now called Pembo and East Rembo.

The Fort McKinley Tunnel was intended for the creation of an underground aerial bombing-free Air Warning Service of the Army Air Force known as “The Fort McKinley Project”. It was to be a part of the modernization of the country's communication facilities. Digging for the tunnel began in October 1941.

On January 2, 1942, the Japanese entered Manila. They immediately captured Fort McKinley, turning it to one of their important installations and renaming it Sakura Heiei (Cherry Blossom Barracks).

After their arrival in 1942, the Japanese continued extending further the tunnel but left it when Manila's liberation campaign started in October 1944. As the US Air Force started bombing Manila, the Sakura Heiei's tunnel served as shelter of the high military officials. On February 13, 1945, the Japanese abandoned Fort McKinley.

In 1949, the base was transferred to the Philippine Government and renamed Fort Bonifacio. It also became the Philippine Army headquarters. The tunnel was made into ammunition storage and supply storeroom and later part of the Philippine Army Museum and Library. The tunnel was last rehabilitated in 1976. In 1995, the tunnel was officially closed to the public.

In 2023, the Embo barangays of East Rembo and Pembo were removed from Makati and transferred to Taguig in accordance of a Supreme Court ruling that places the entire Fort Bonifacio area, as well as the tunnel, under the latter city government.
