= Naval Aircraft Museum (Kolkata) =

- Location: Kolkata, West Bengal, India
- Coordinates: 22.57704°N 88.47818°E
- Type: Military aviation museum
- Owner: West Bengal Housing Infrastructure Development Corporation
- Public transit access: Sub CBD 1 metro station

The Naval Aircraft Museum is a military aviation museum located in New Town, Kolkata, India. It is built by the Kolkata Metropolitan Development Authority and is exhibiting a Tupolev Tu-142 of Indian Navy.

== Details ==
=== Location ===
The museum is located in DJ Block, Narkel Bagan, Action Area I of New Town, Kolkata, next to the New Town police station.

=== History ===
The initiative for a military museum was taken by the Kolkata Metropolitan Development Authority (KMDA). It is second museum of its kind in the country, after Visakhapatnam. West Bengal Housing Infrastructure Development Corporation (HIDCO) wants to build attraction zones at each leg of Kolkata Gate. So, a two-acre land that was chosen by HIDCO near the gate. After completion, KMDA will handover the museum to HIDCO. The museum is being built in phases. The first phase was clearing and flattening the land, erecting the foundation, reassembly and installation of the aircraft. The next phase includes identification of an architect to design the layout of the museum. Initially, the opening of the museum was expected by mid-2020, but it was delayed due to the COVID-19 pandemic and lockdown.

== Aircraft on display ==
A decommissioned, 29-year-old Tupolev Tu-142 of the Indian Navy was handed over to the government of West Bengal in February 2020, for setting up the aircraft museum. The aircraft was brought from INS Rajali, Arakkonam in Tamil Nadu, in pieces on sixteen trucks. Transportation and installation costs are being borne by the state government. Reassembly process of the aircraft was started by KMDA, in March 2020. Other exhibits for its interior and surroundings like a mannequin pilot, bombs, machinery etc. will be developed by the Navy. The architect responsible for Master Plan and Illumination Design of the Museum is Debmalya Guha of PACE Consultants Kolkata. The museum was inaugurated by Smt. Mamata Banerjee, Chief Minister of West Bengal, on 8 June 2022. Apart from the aircraft on display, there is a small children's park and a coffee shop.

== See also ==
- Indian Museum, Kolkata
- National Maritime Heritage Complex (Lothal in Gujarat)
- Naval Aviation Museum (Goa)
- Samudrika Naval Marine Museum (Andaman)
