= Indian Air Force Museum, Palam =

Aerospace museum in New Delhi, India

Indian Air Force Museum Palam
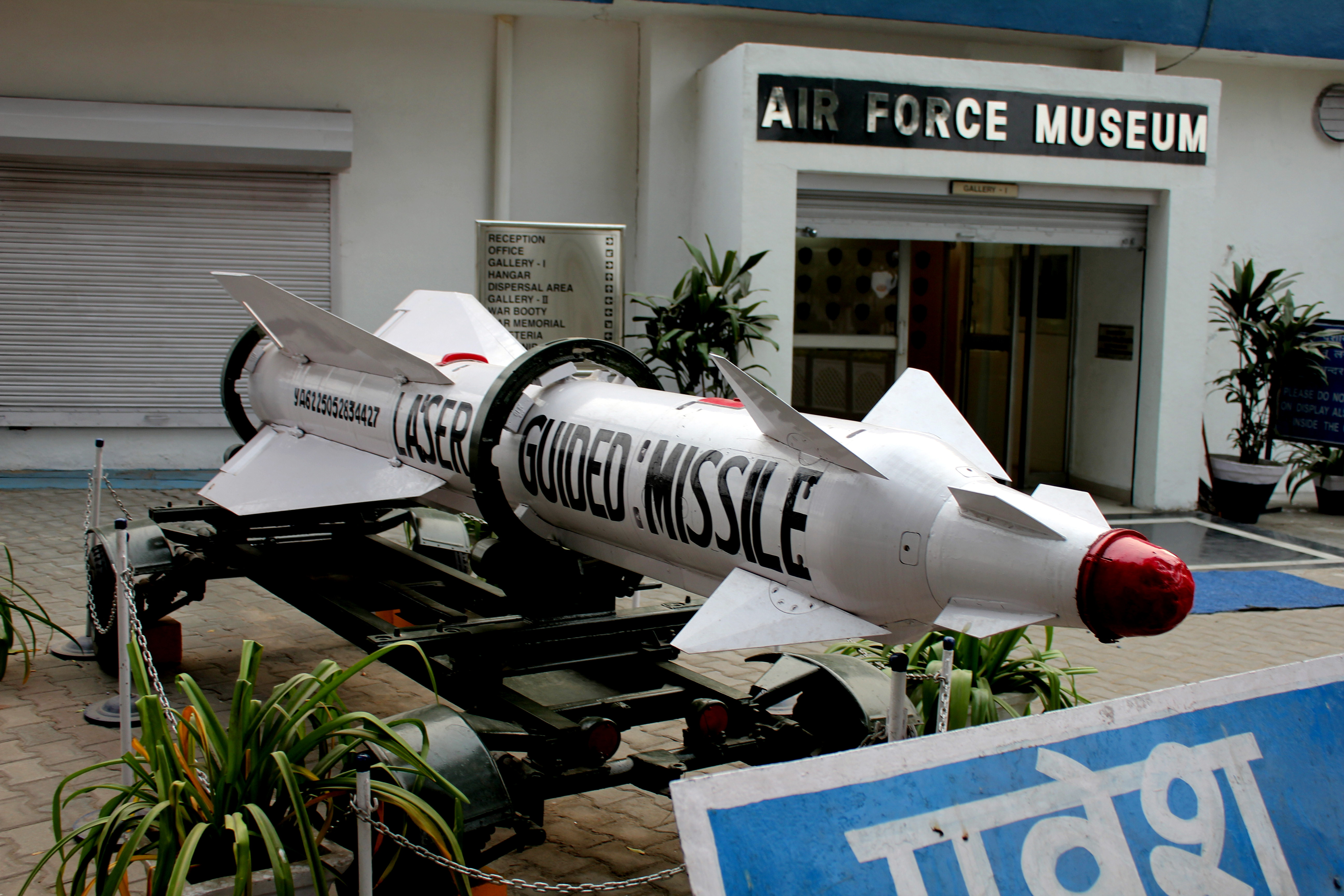
- Entrance to the Air Force Museum with a laser guided missile
- Established: 1967
- Location: Delhi Cantonment, New Delhi
- Coordinates: 28°34′26″N 77°07′01″E
- Type: Aviation museum

The Indian Air Force Museum Palam, is the museum of the Indian Air Force (IAF), and is located at the Palam Air Force Station in Delhi Cantonment, New Delhi, India. It was established in 1967 and exhibits details about combat operations undertaken by the air force depicting its history since its formation in 1932. Also on display are various aircraft and equipment on the IAF’s inventory since its inception. The museum was the only one of its kind in India until the opening of the Naval Aviation Museum in Goa in 1998 and HAL Aerospace Museum in Bangalore in 2001.

== Description ==
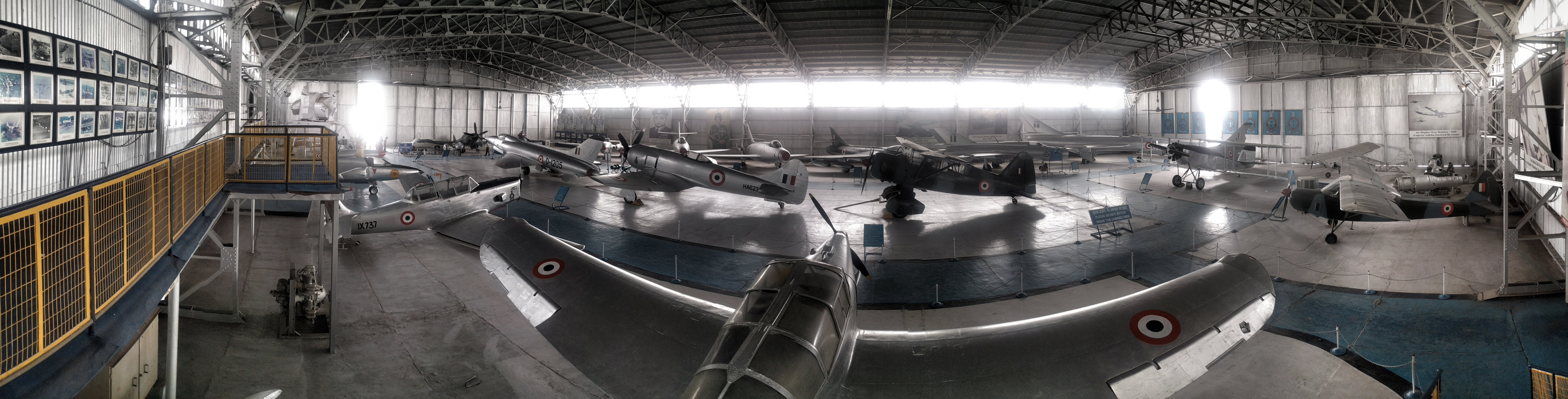
Panoramic view of hangar 2 in the museum

The Museum entrance features an indoor display gallery that contains historic photographs, memorabilia, uniforms and personal weapons of the Indian Air Force from its inception in 1932. The gallery leads to a hangar exhibiting small aircraft and Air Force inventory including anti-aircraft guns, vehicles and ordnance. Larger aircraft are exhibited outside the hangar. The outdoor gallery contains aircraft as well as several war trophies, radar equipment and captured enemy vehicles.

The Vintage Aircraft Flight services some rare aircraft and maintains them in an airworthy condition. These aircraft are not normally accessible by the general public. Large transport aircraft are stored on the apron of the airbase due to lack of space. These aircraft are displayed only on the annual Air Force Day, October 8. The museum has a small souvenir shop.

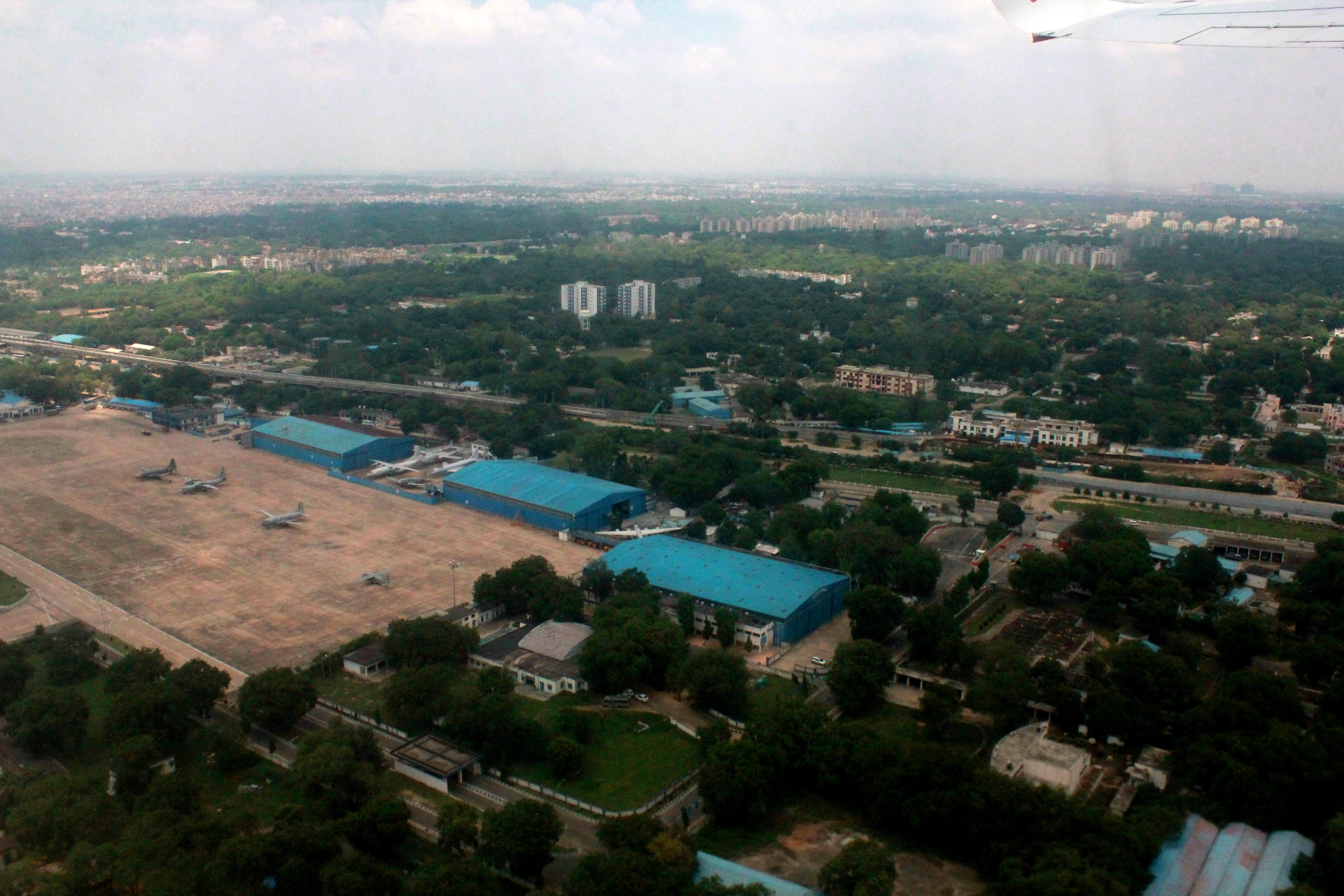
Delhi aerial photo including Indian Air Force Museum

== New location ==
To improve the presentation and preservation of the aircraft, the Indian Air Force decided to relocate the museum to a larger and more accessible location. A new 43-acre (17 ha) site near the domestic terminal of the airport was chosen. The then Chief of Air Staff and Chairman Chief of Staff Committee, Air Chief Marshal SP Tyagi, laid the foundation stone for the project on 1 December 2006. The new aerospace museum was planned to have two main types of displays, indoor and outdoor. The outdoor displays would have aircraft parked and hung in flying altitude with mural depicting the era and atmosphere of its time of operation. The children's area would also be created where children could enter cockpits of display aircraft.

In October 2020, the Military Engineer Services invited bids for construction of the museum at an estimated cost of ₹ 240 crore.

== Aircraft on display ==
=== Hangar ===
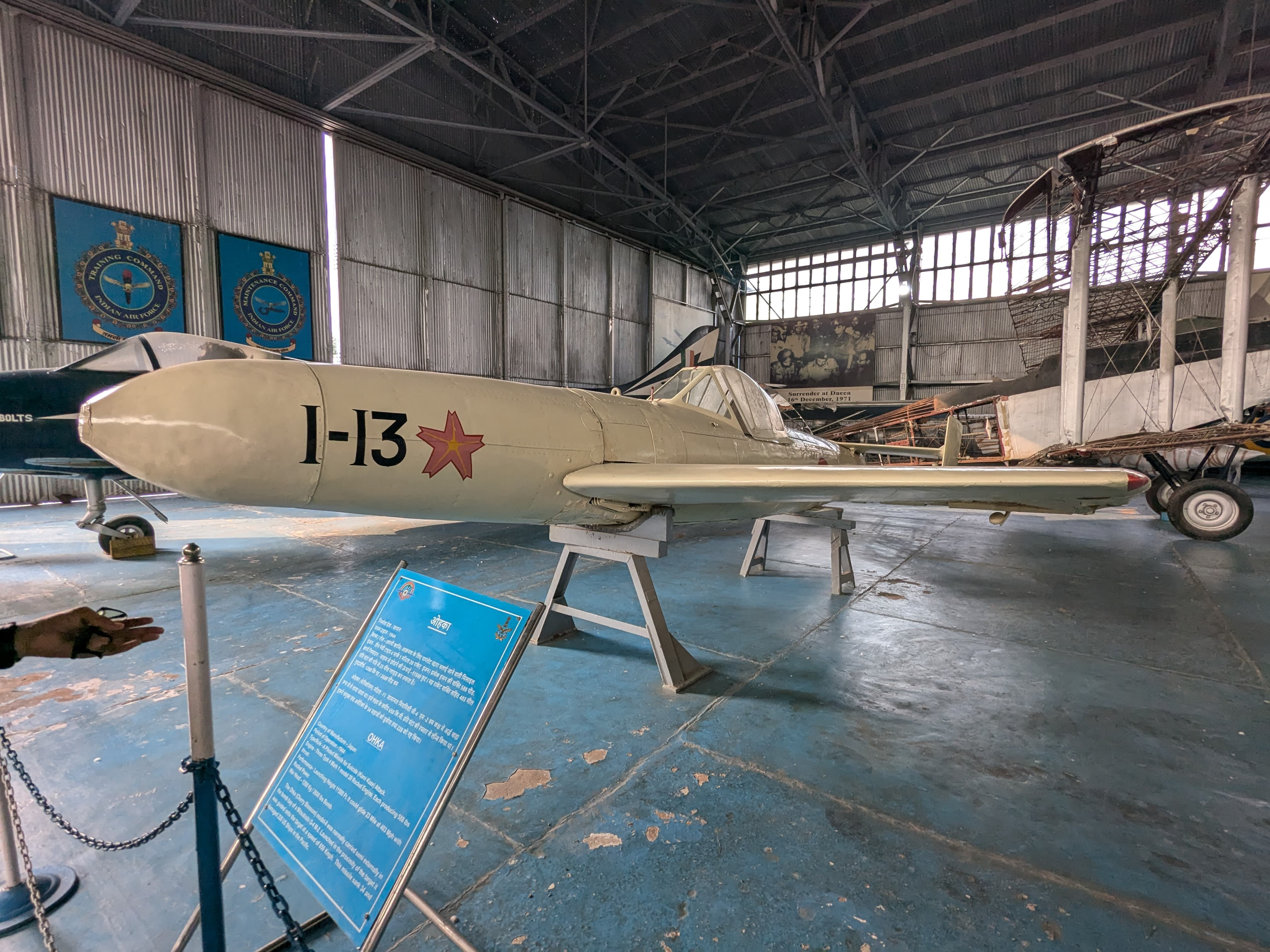
Imperial Japanese Yokosuka MXY7 Ohka on display

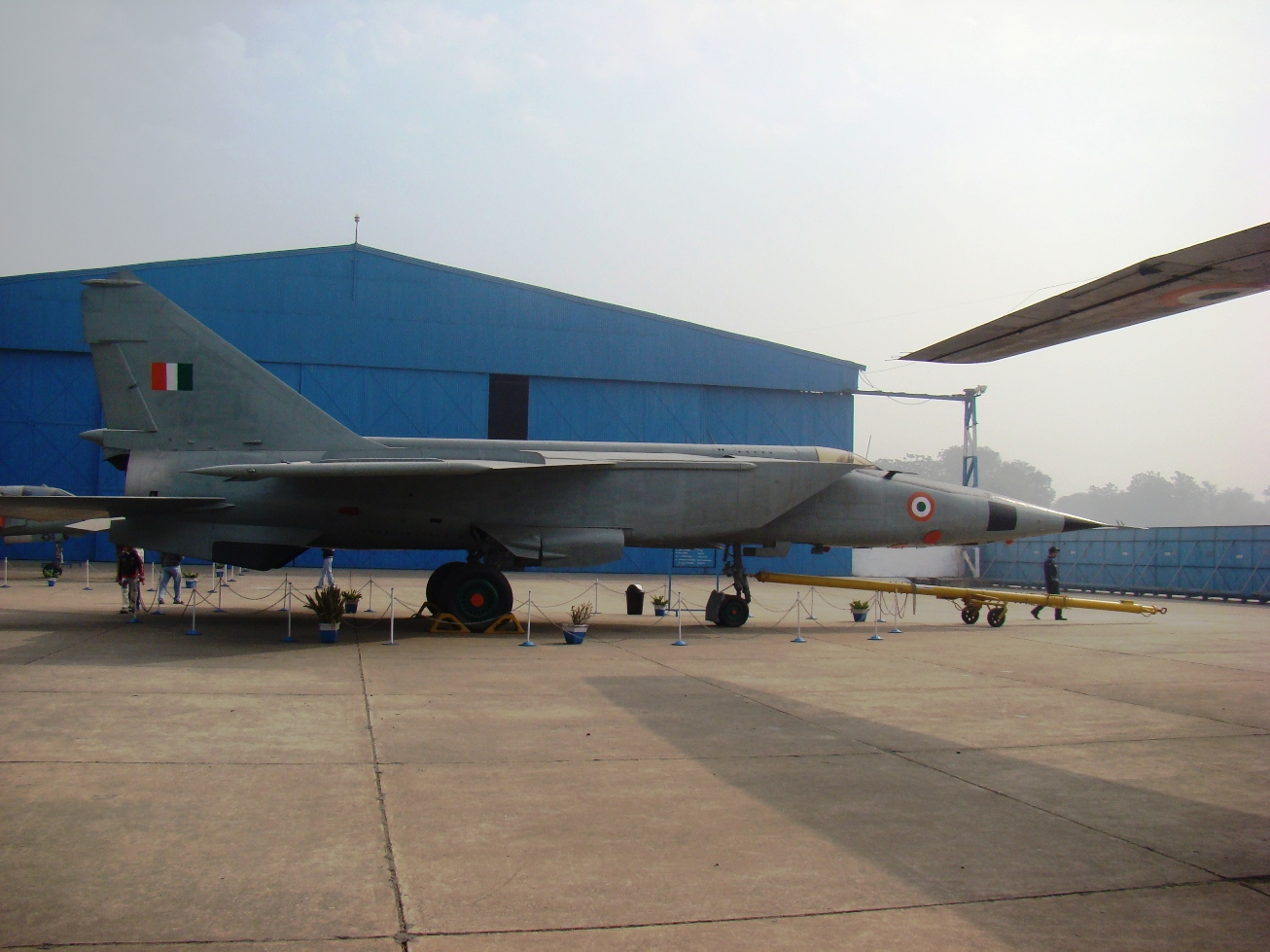
MiG-25R of No. 102 Squadron IAF on display

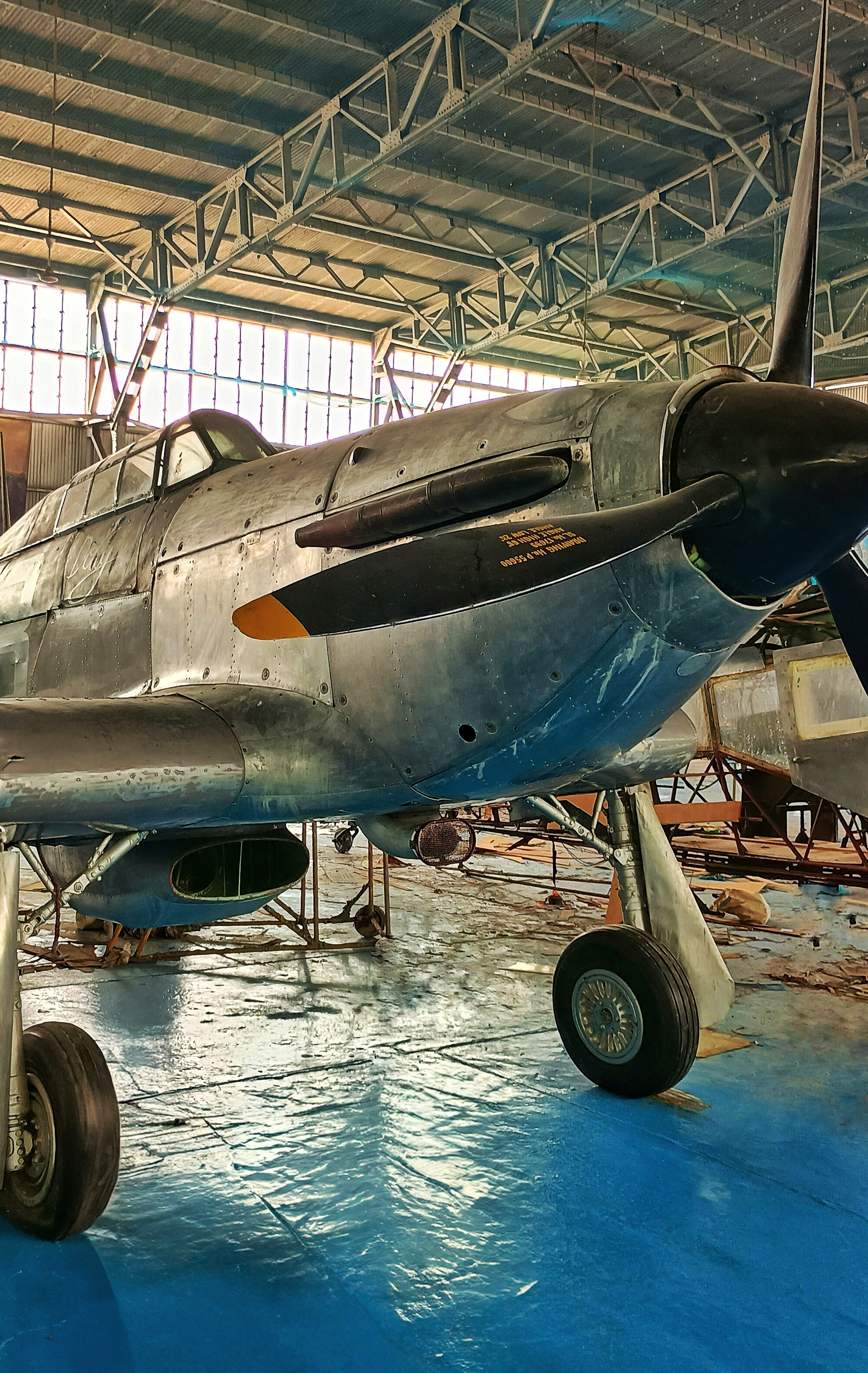
Hawker Hurricane on display

- Westland Lysander P-9160
- Westland Wapiti K-813
- Percival Prentice IV-3381
- Hawker Hunter A-476 in Thunderbolts colour scheme
- Hawker Hurricane II B AB-832
- Hawker Tempest II HA-623
- Yokosuka MXY-7 Okha I-13
- Supermarine Spitfire XVIII HS-986
- Dassault Mystere IVa IA-1329
- Dassault Ouragan IC-554
- De Havilland Vampire NF10 ID-606
- HAL Gnat II E-2015
- Sukhoi Su-7 BMK B-888
- MiG-21 FL C-992, C-2216
- HAL Krishak HAOP-27
- HAL HF-24 Marut D-1205
- PZL TS-11 Iskra W-1757, W-1758
- F-86 Sabre 606 in Pakistani colour scheme

=== Outdoor Gallery ===
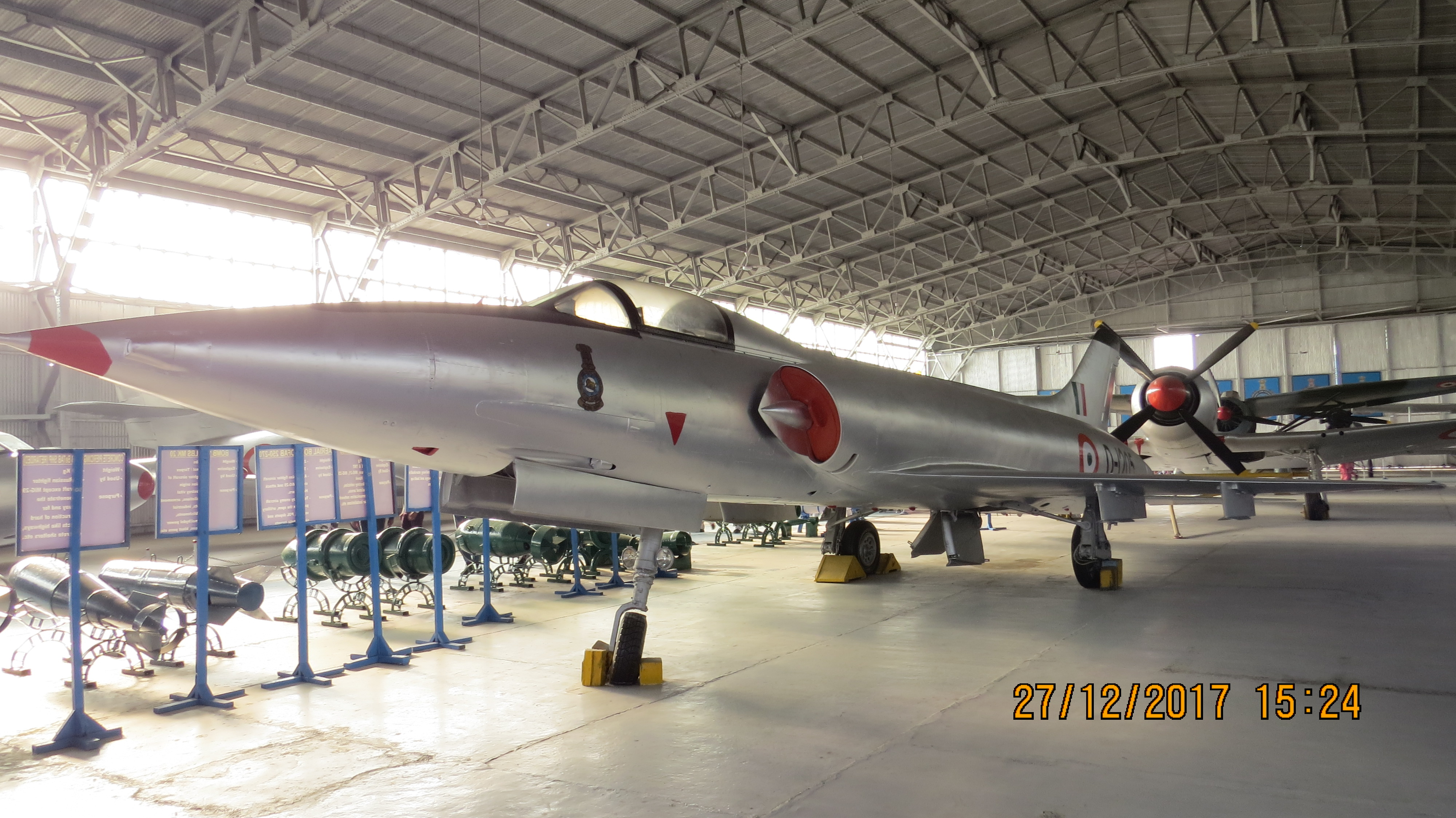
HAL HF-24 Marut D-1205 on display

- BAE Canberra B(I)58 IF-907
- Consolidated B-24 Liberator J HE-924
- Fairchild C-119 Flying Boxcar IK-450
- Sikorsky S55C IZ-1590
- Mil Mi-4 BZ-900
- MiG-23MF SK434
- MiG-25R KP-355
- MiG-27

=== Vintage Aircraft Flight ===
- De Havilland DH-82 Tiger Moth HU-512
- De Havilland Vampire FB52 IB-799
- Supermarine Spitfire VIII NH-631
- HAL Gnat II E-265
- HAL HT-2 IX-737
- North American Harvard HT-291
- Douglas C-47 IJ-302
- HAL HT-2 IX-732

=== Transport Aircraft Section ===
- Antonov An-12 BL-727
- De Havilland DHC-4 Caribou BM-774
- Douglas C-47 IJ-817
- Ilyushin Il-14 IL-860
- Tupolev Tu-124 V-644

== See also ==
- Indian Air Force Heritage Museum, Chandigarh
- Indira Gandhi International Airport
- List of aerospace museums
- Naval Aviation Museum (India)
