= National Maritime Heritage Complex =

- Location: Lothal, Ahmedabad district, Gujarat, India
- Coordinates: 22.50840567°N 72.23992864°E
- Type: Meritime history museum, amusement park
- Curator: NMHC

National Maritime Heritage Complex (NMHC) is an under construction tourism complex near Lothal in Ahmedabad district of Gujarat, India which will present the maritime heritage of India. The complex will have museums, amusement parks, educational institute, hotels and resort. It will also recreate Dholavira and Lothal cities in the complex.

== History ==
The NMHC is being constructed near Lothal, an ancient maritime port city of Indus Valley Civillisation. The construction is being done under the Sagar Mala scheme of the Ministry of Ports, Shipping and Waterways of Government of India. The masterplan was finalised in March 2019. The foundation stone was laid by Prime Minister Narendra Modi on 4 March 2019. The project is being built in phases.

The NMHC is estimated to cost ₹3,500 crore (US$370 million) to ₹4,500 crore (US$470 million). The Government of Gujarat allocated land; built road, water supply and electricity lines; and contributed ₹150 crore (US$16 million) for internal infrastructure. The major ports funded ₹209 crore (US$22 million).

Architecture firm Hafeez Contractor served as the principal management consultant. The Indian Port, Rail and Ropeway Corporation Limited was awarded the implementation work. The Phase 1A is being built by Tata Projects. The Phase 1A is expected to complete by March 2024.

== Features ==
The NMHC will be spread over an area of 400 acres (160 ha) including 375 acres (152 ha) for the complex and 25 acres (10 ha) for the staff residential facilities. The National Maritime Heritage Museum will have 14 galleries depicting maritime history of India from the Harappan era to present.

=== Phase 1 ===
Under Phase 1A, the National Maritime Heritage Museum with 5 galleries and a naval gallery will be built at cost of ₹774.23 crore (US$81 million). It will be spread over an area of 35 acres (14 ha). Under Phase 1B, the rest of the National Maritime Heritage Museum galleries, Light House Museum, 5D dome theatre, gardens and other infrastructure will be built.

Under construction galleries of National Maritime Heritage Museum
| Gallery | Theme |
|---|---|
| 1 | Orientation and oceanic mythology (see Varuna) |
| 2 | Harappans: The Pioneer Seafarers |
| 3 | Post Harappan Trajectories: The Impact of Climate change |
| 4 | India's contact with the Greco-Roman world (see also Indo-Roman relations) |
| 5 | Special exhibitions: Naval Gallery (see also Samudrika Naval Marine Museum Andaman, Naval Aircraft Museum (Kolkata), and Naval Aviation Museum (Goa)); Evolution of the Indian Navy and Indian Coast Guard |

=== Phase 2 ===
State pavilions depicting maritime heritage of each coastal state and union territory of India will be built. The Maritime Institute; four amusement parks including Maritime and Naval Theme Park, Monuments Theme Park, Climate Change Theme Park, Adventure and Amusement Theme Park; hotels and resort will be built under this phase. It will also to recreate Dholavira and Lothal cities as they were in ancient times.

== See also ==
- Rakhigarhi Indus Valley Civilisation Museum
