= Naval Aviation Museum (Goa) =

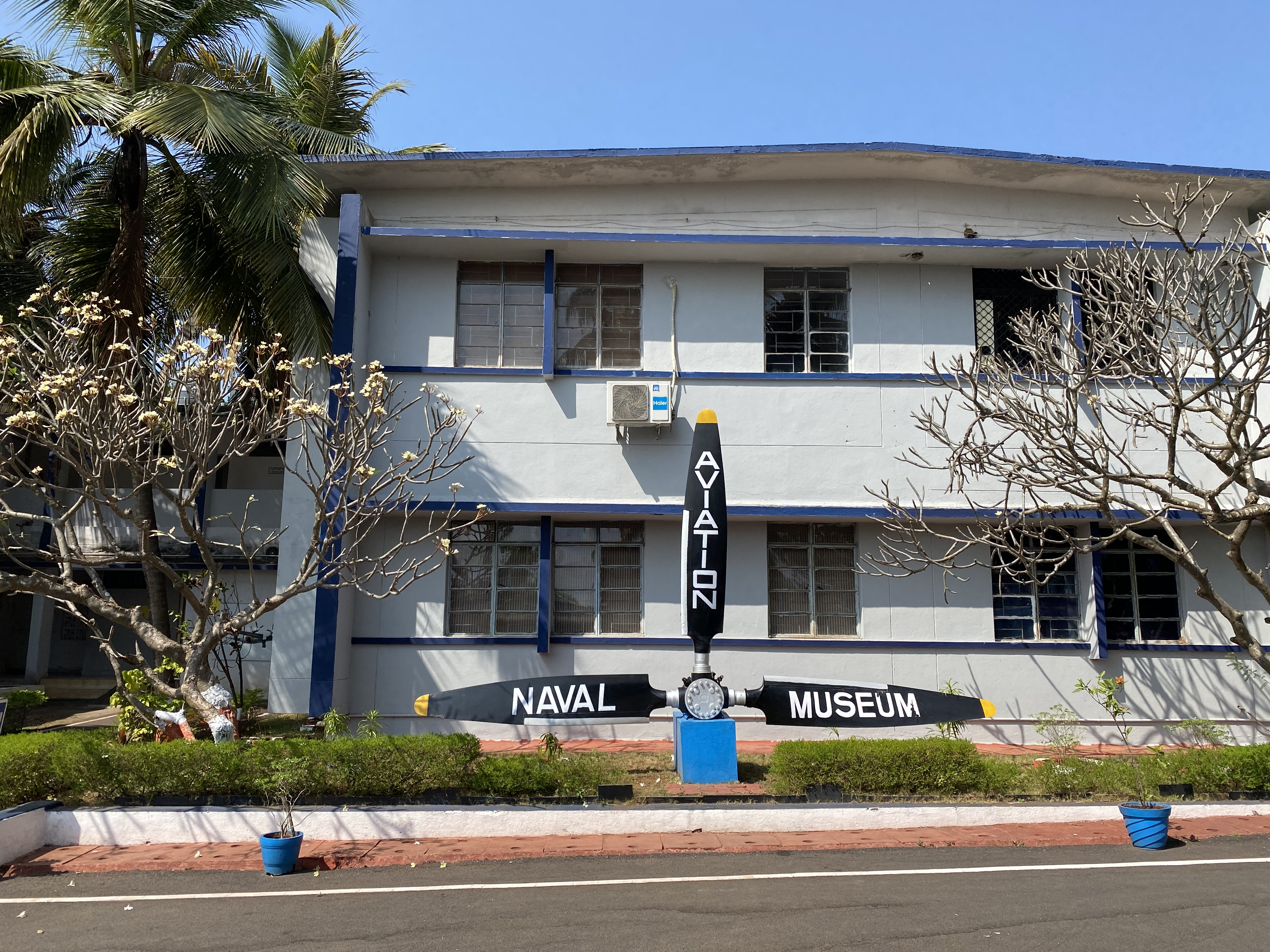
- Naval Aviation Museum in 2024

- Location within Goa, India
- Established: 12 October 1998; 27 years ago
- Location: Vasco da Gama, Goa, India
- Coordinates: 15.374743°N 73.838543°E
- Type: Aviation museum

The Naval Aviation Museum is a military aviation museum located in Bogmalo, 6 kilometres (3.7 mi) from Vasco da Gama, Goa, India focused on the history of the Indian Naval Air Arm. The museum is divided into two main parts, an outdoor exhibit and a two-storey indoor gallery.

== History ==
The museum was founded on 12 October 1998 with a collection of 6 aircraft.

== Exhibits ==
The indoor gallery features rooms focused on specific topics. These include naval armament – such as bombs, torpedoes, autocannons, and sensors – and the progression of uniforms of the Indian air and naval forces. Also on display are large models of the INS Vikrant and INS Viraat. A number of aircraft engines are on display outside.

== Aircraft on display ==
- Breguet Alizé IN202
- British Aerospace Sea Harrier FRS.51 IN621
- de Havilland Devon C.1 IN124
- de Havilland Vampire T.55 IN149
- Fairey Firefly TT.1 IN112
- HAL Chetak IN475
- HAL HT-2 BX748
- Hawker Sea Hawk Mk 100 IN234
- Hughes 300 IN083
- Kamov Ka-25 IN573
- Lockheed L1049G Super Constellation IN315
- Short Sealand II IN106
- Westland Sea King Mk 42 IN505

== Gallery ==
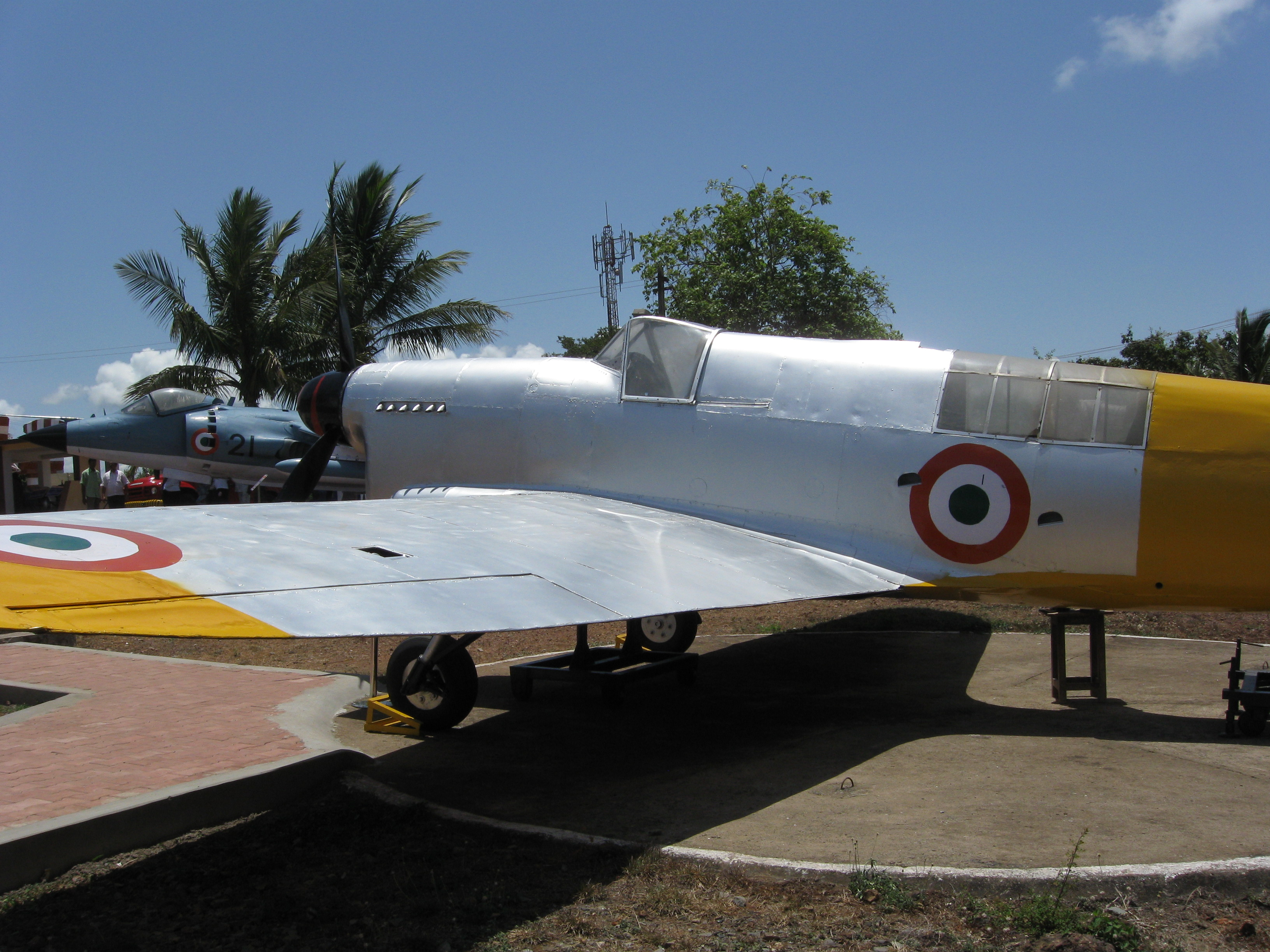
Fairey Firefly

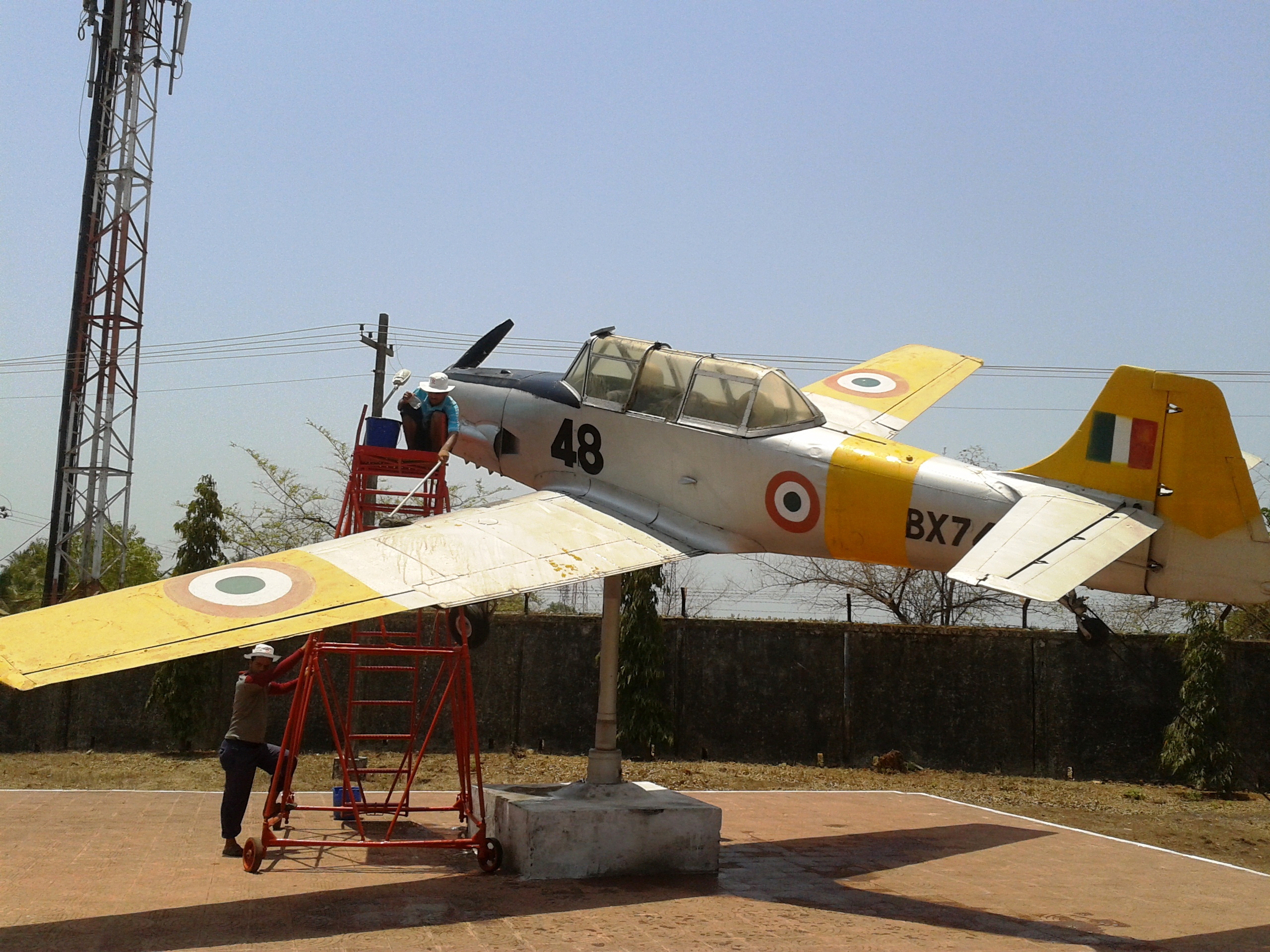
HAL HT-2 being washed

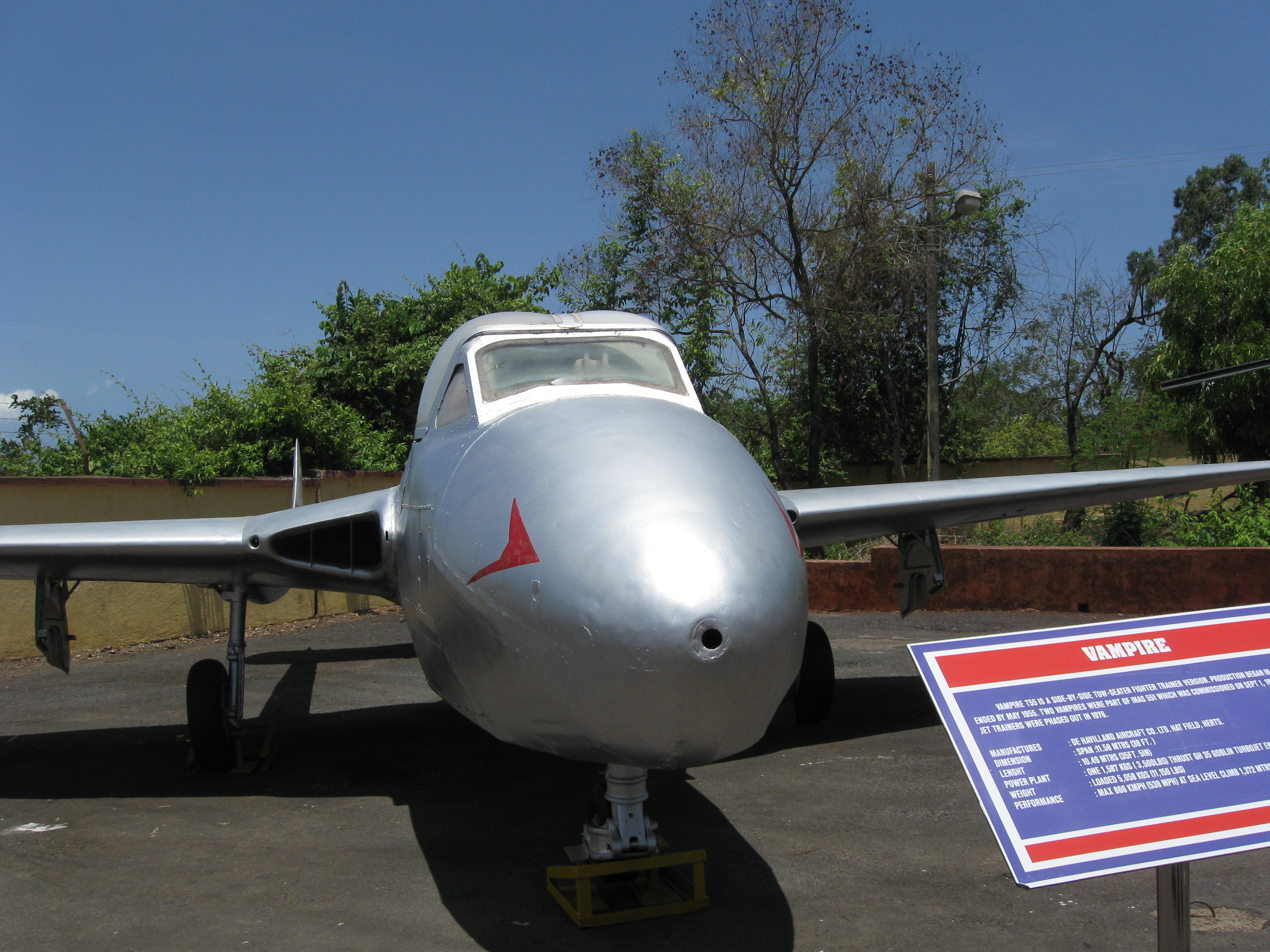
de Havilland Vampire

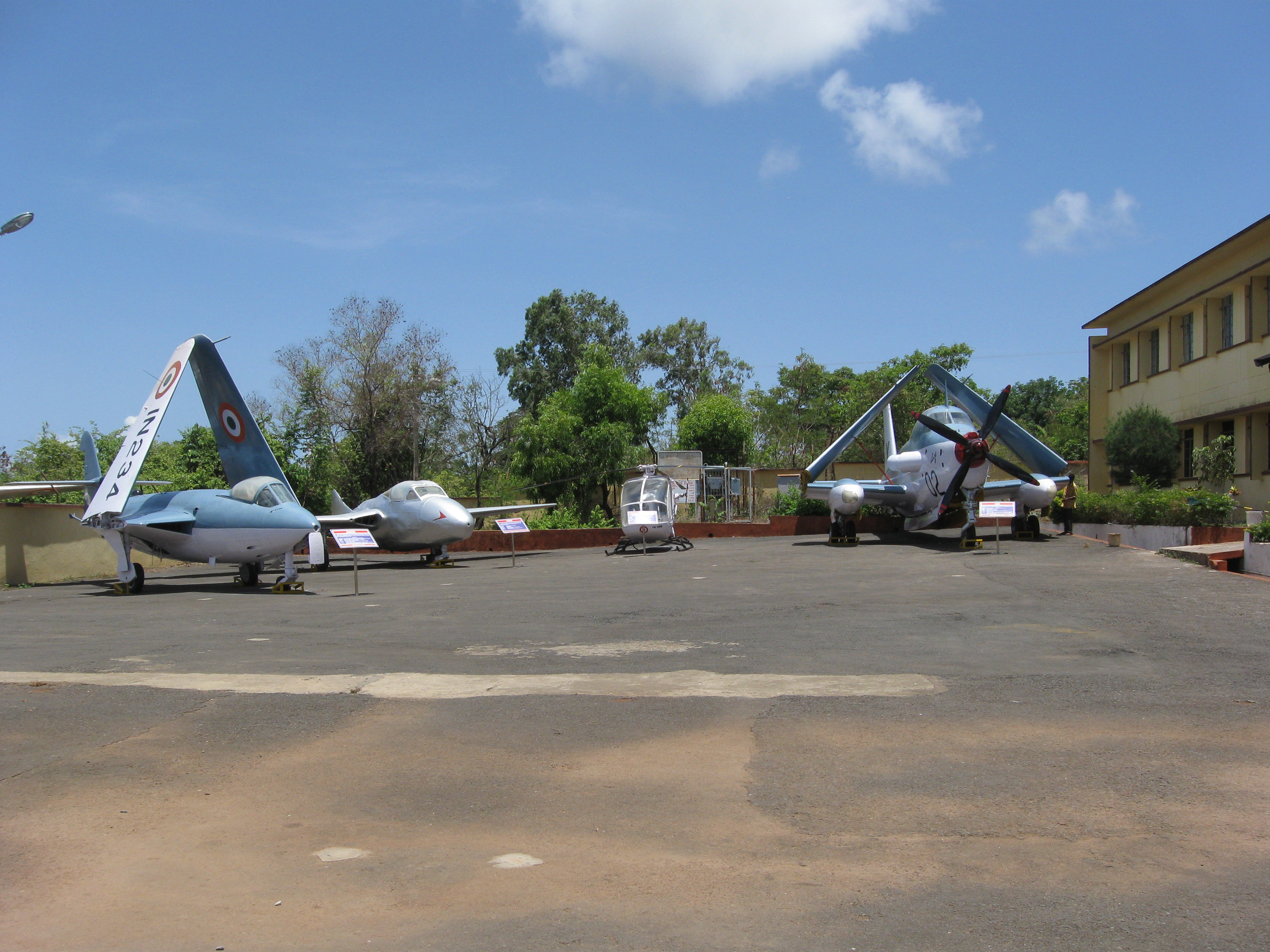
Various aircraft on display

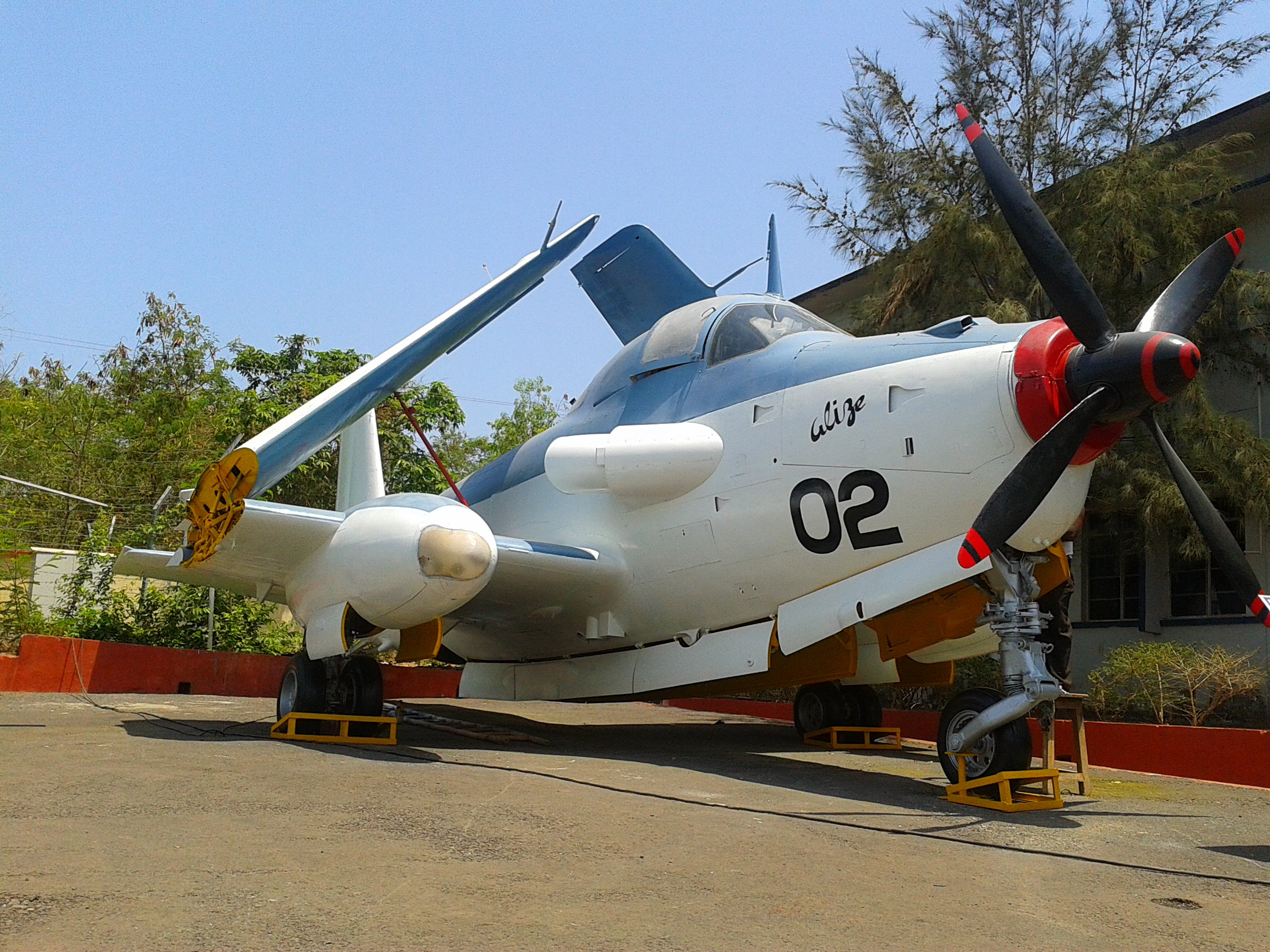
Breguet Alizé

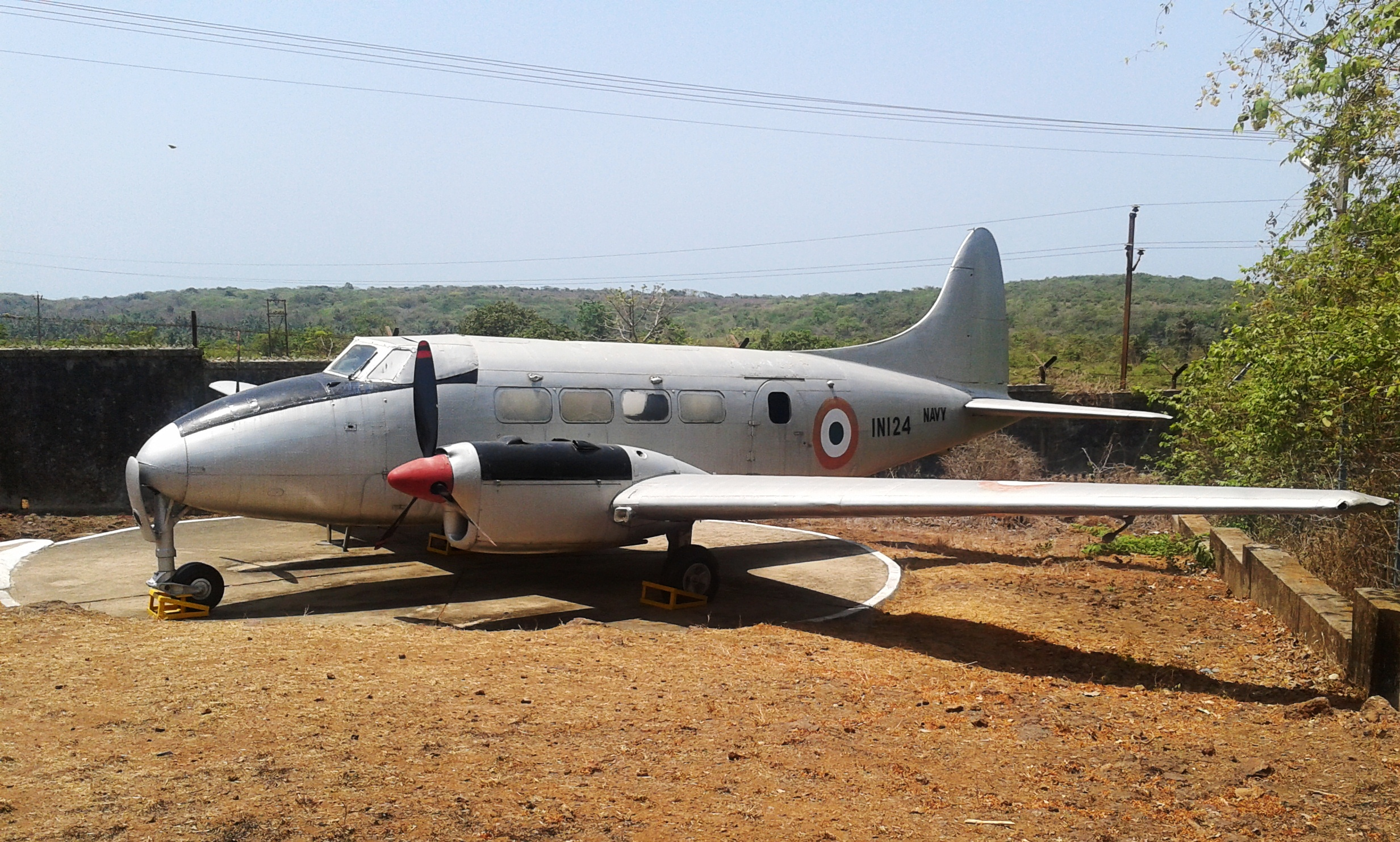
de Havilland Dove

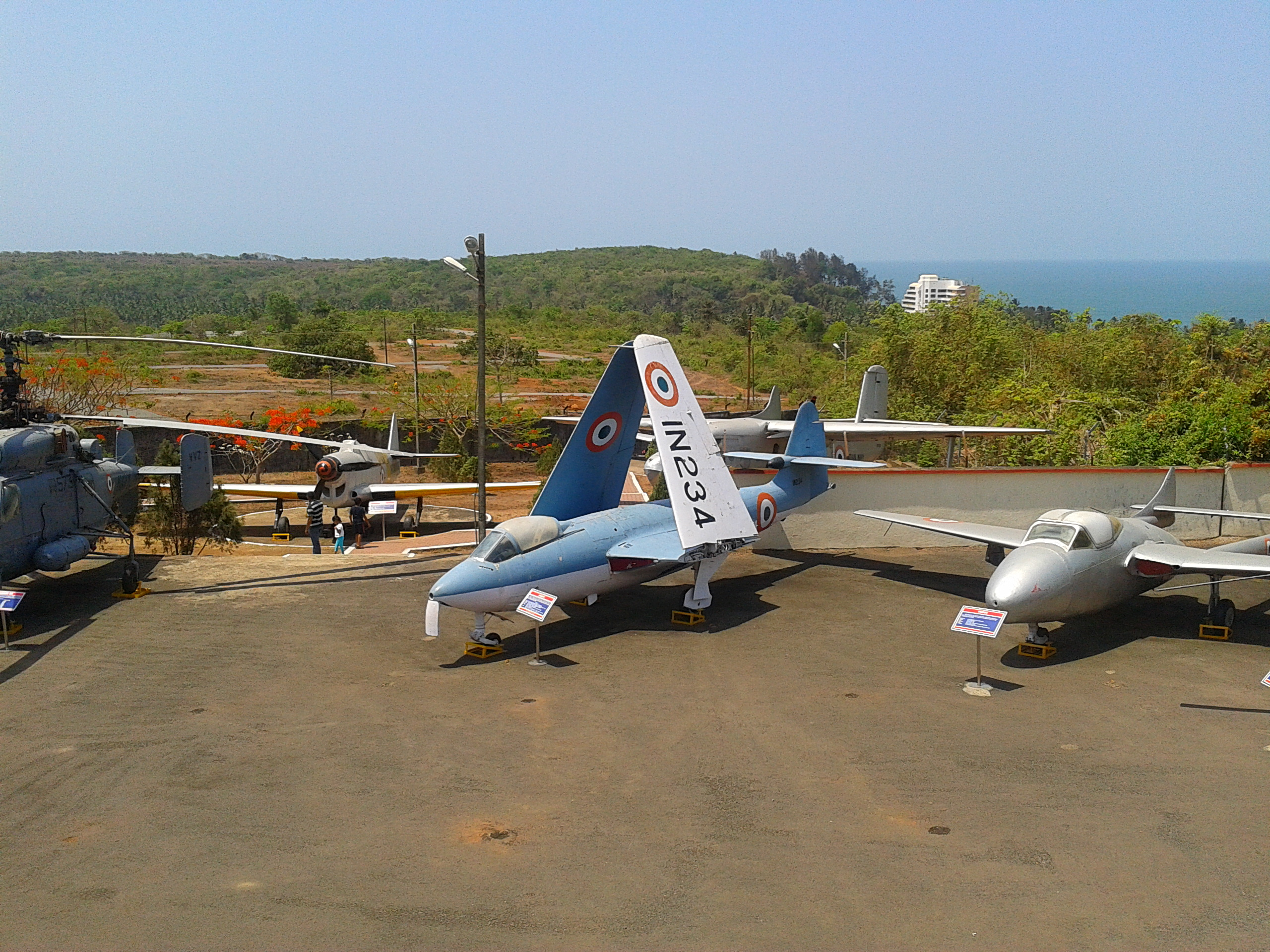
Hawker Sea Hawk (center)

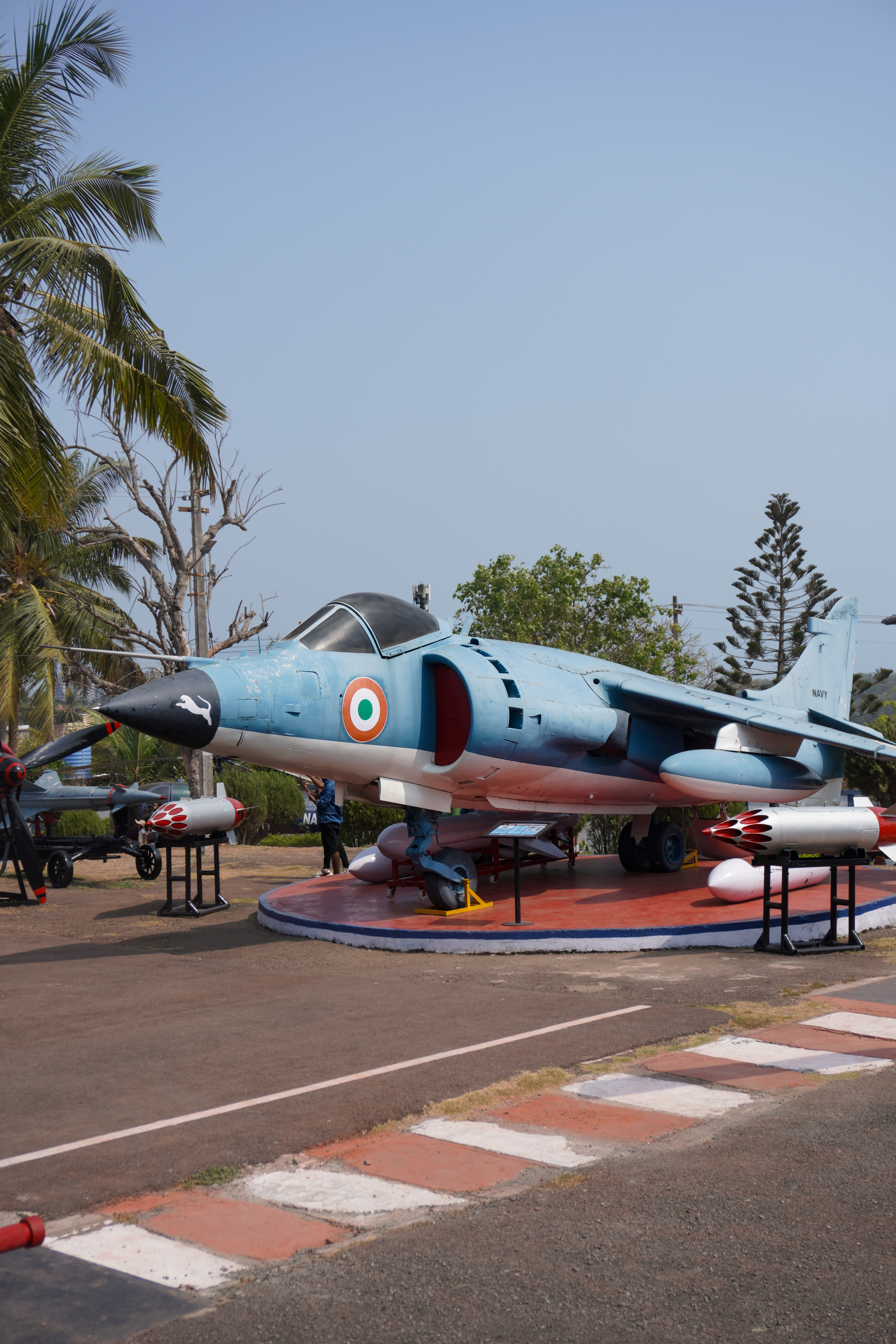
BAE Sea Harrier FRS 51 (IN-621)

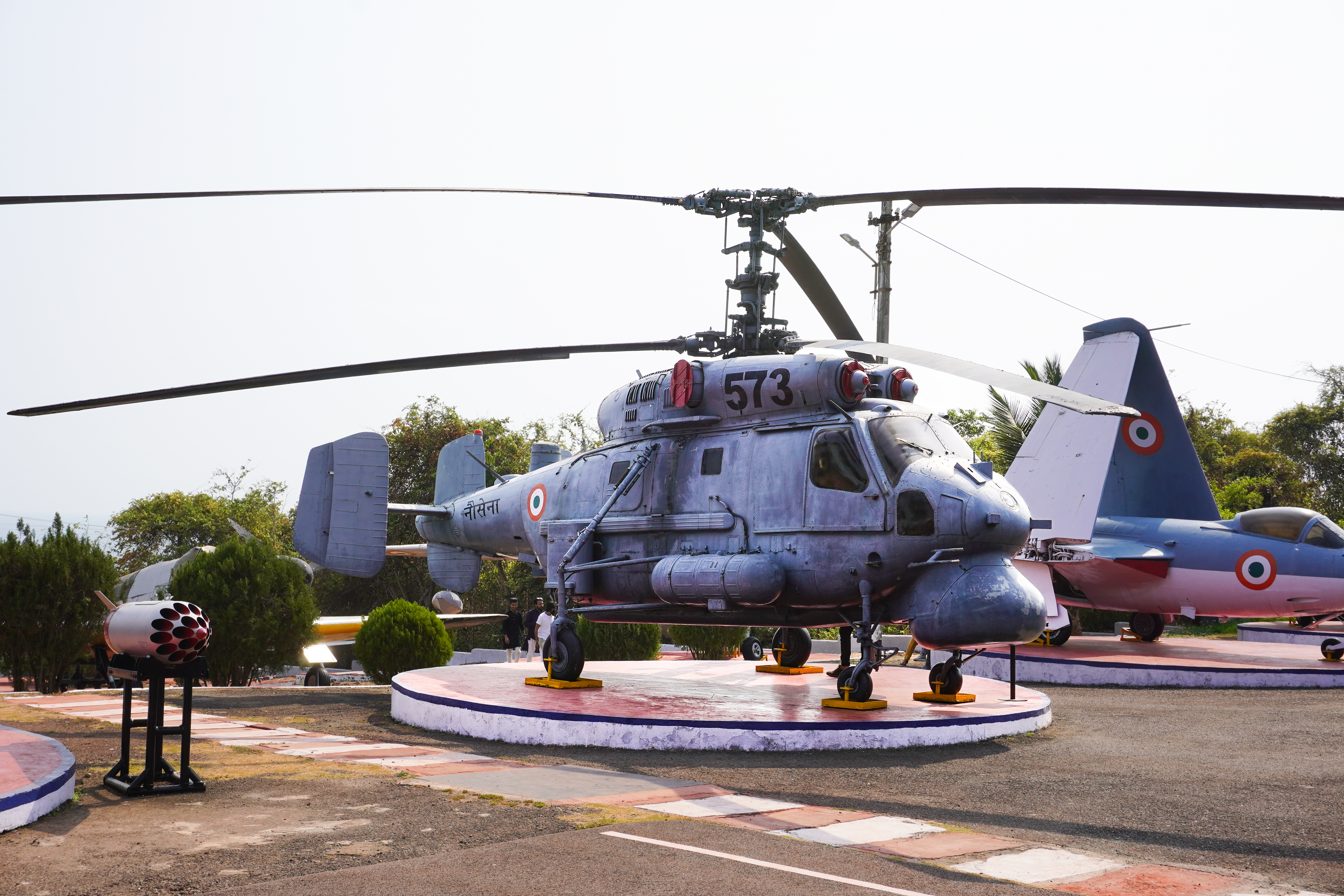
Ka - 25 Helicopter of the Indian Naval Air Arm on display at the Naval Aviation Museum in Goa, India. Picture taken in April 2024

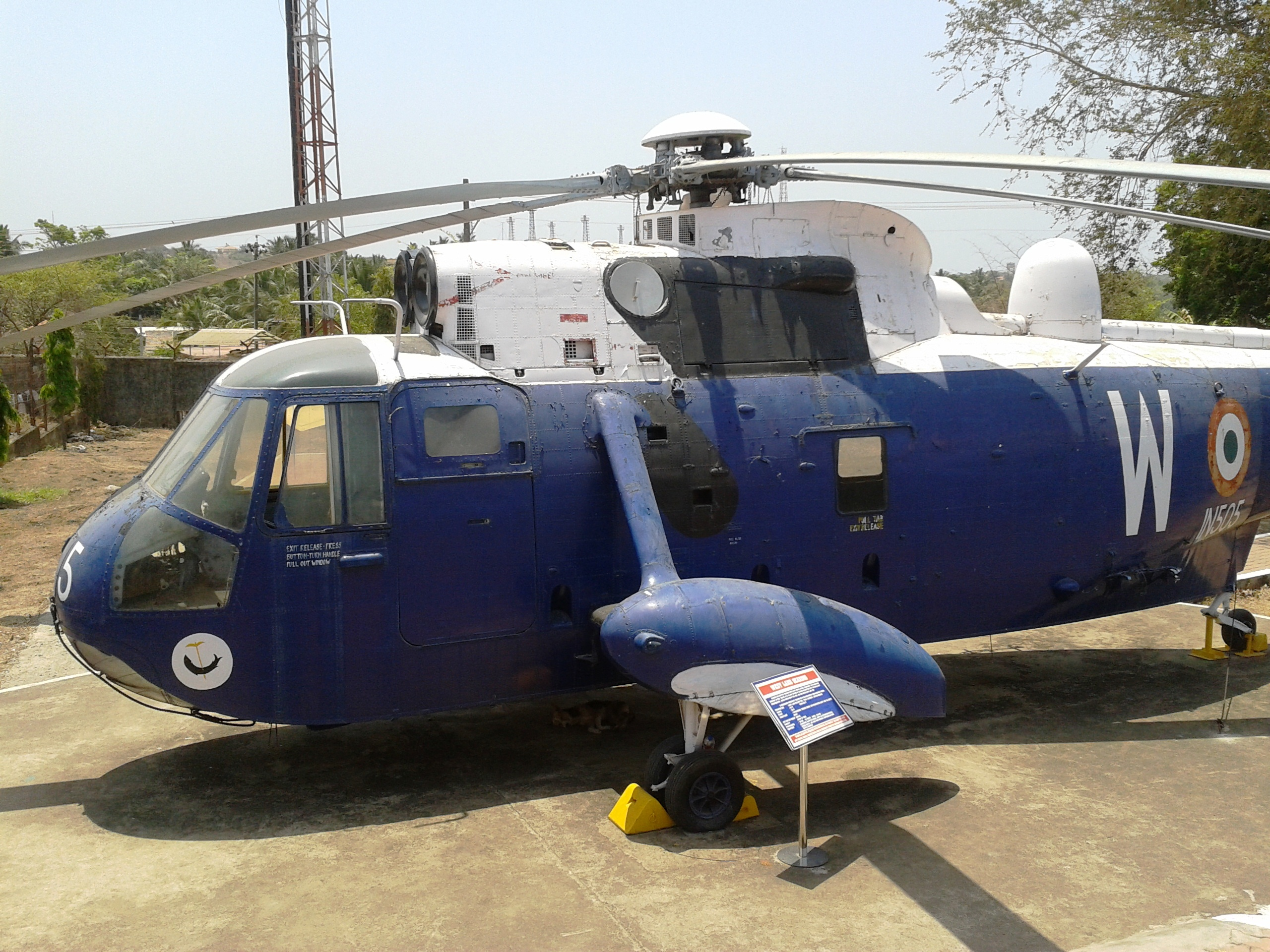
Westland Sea King

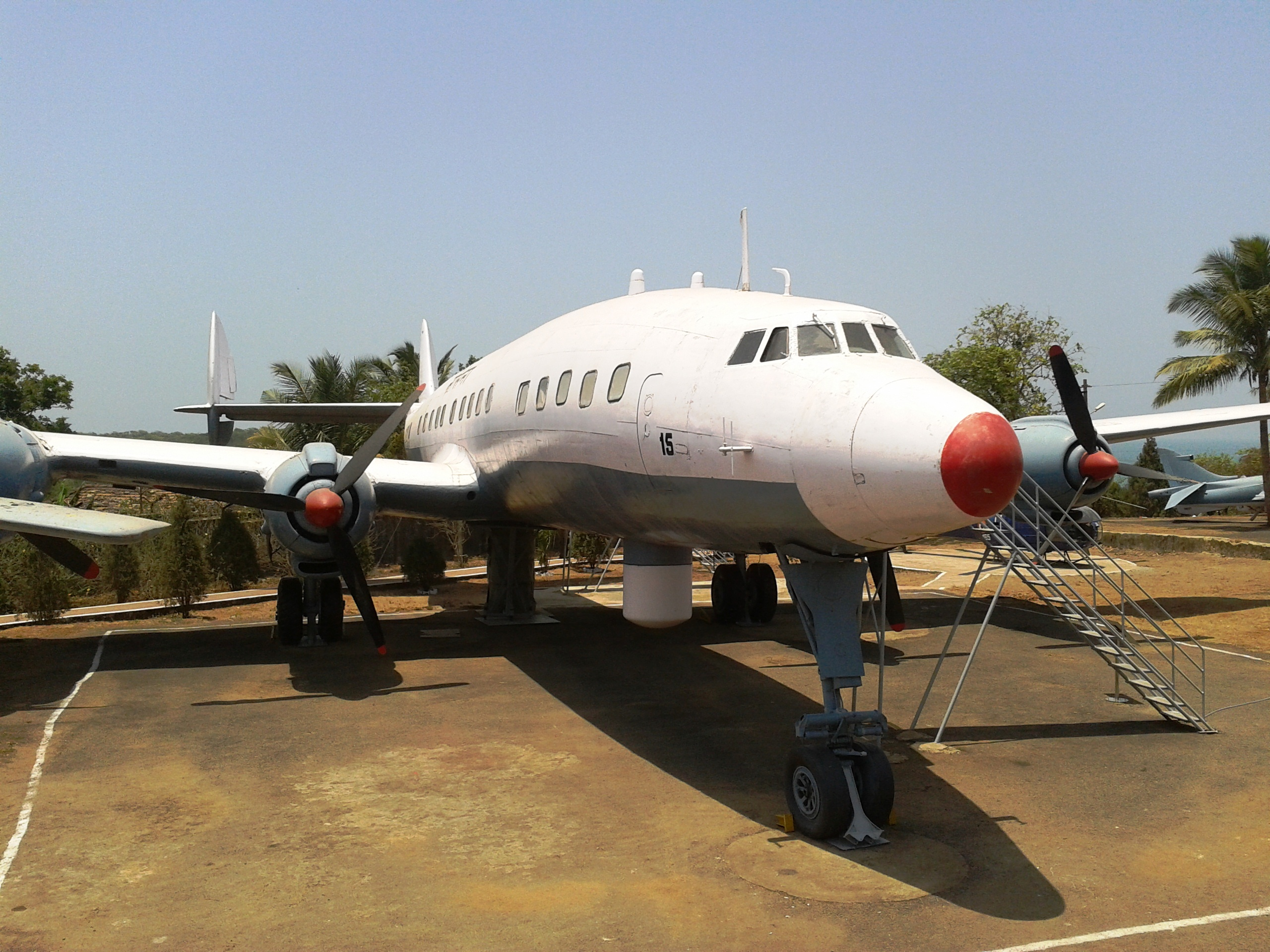
Lockheed Constellation

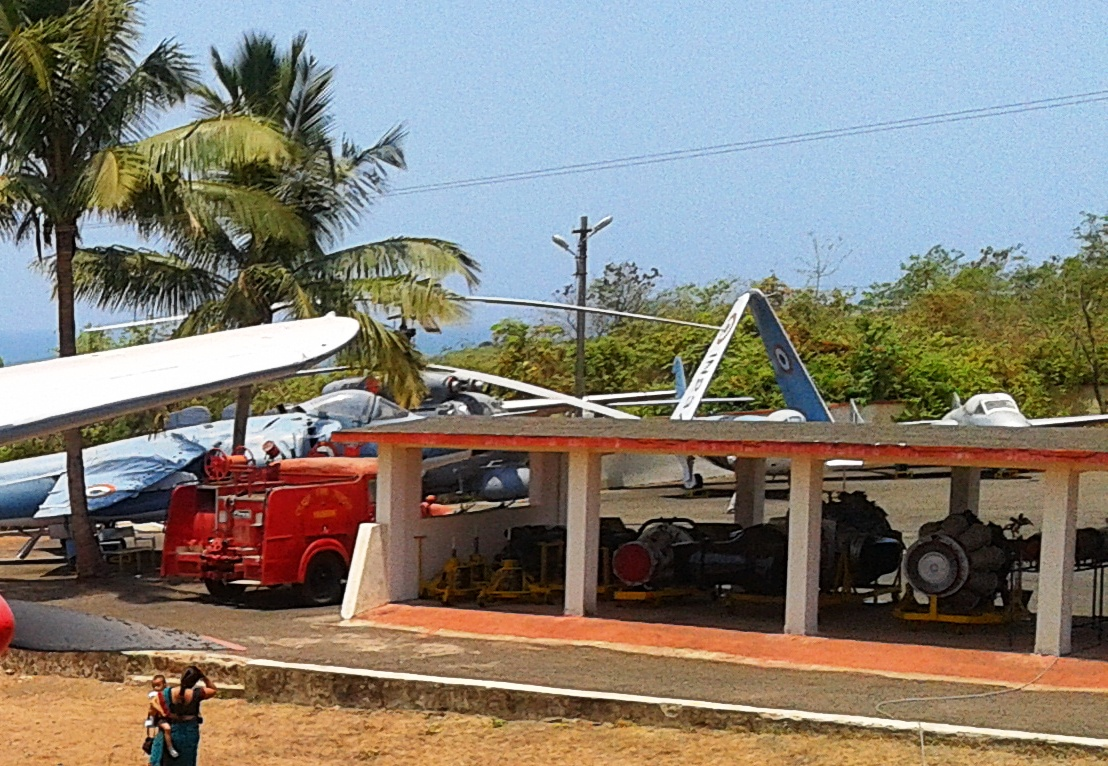
Aircraft engines

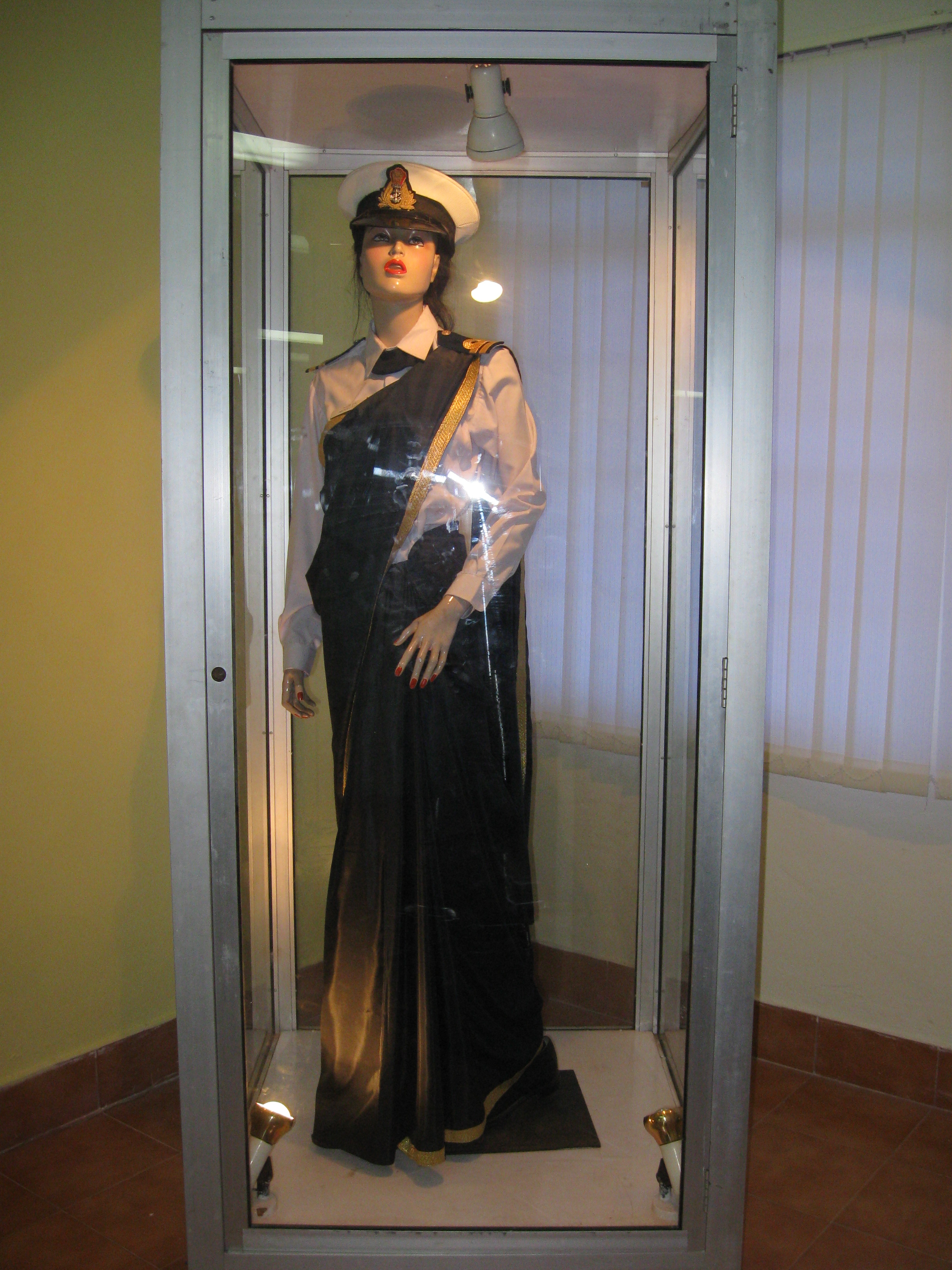
Women's Naval Uniform

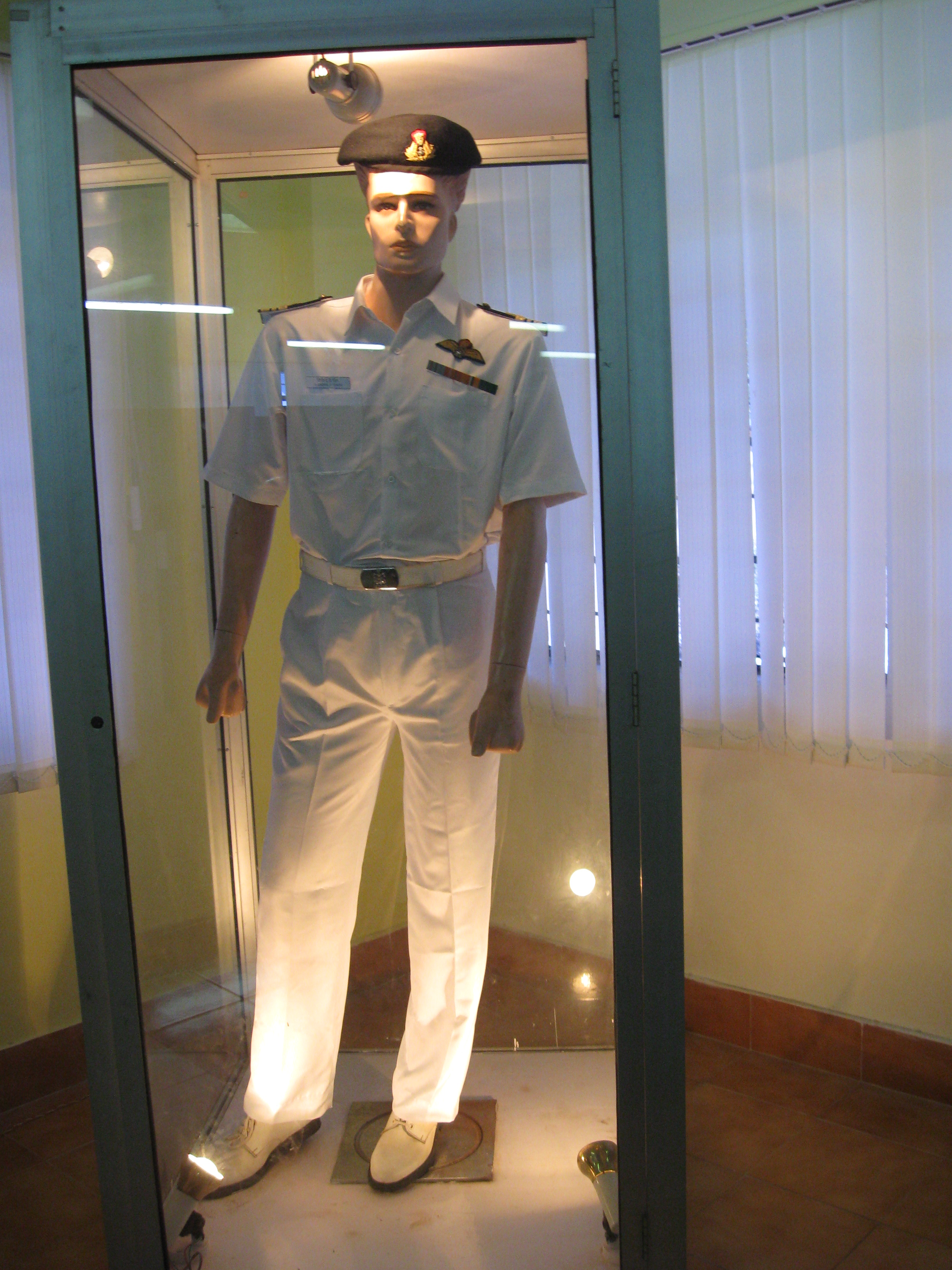
Men's Naval Uniform

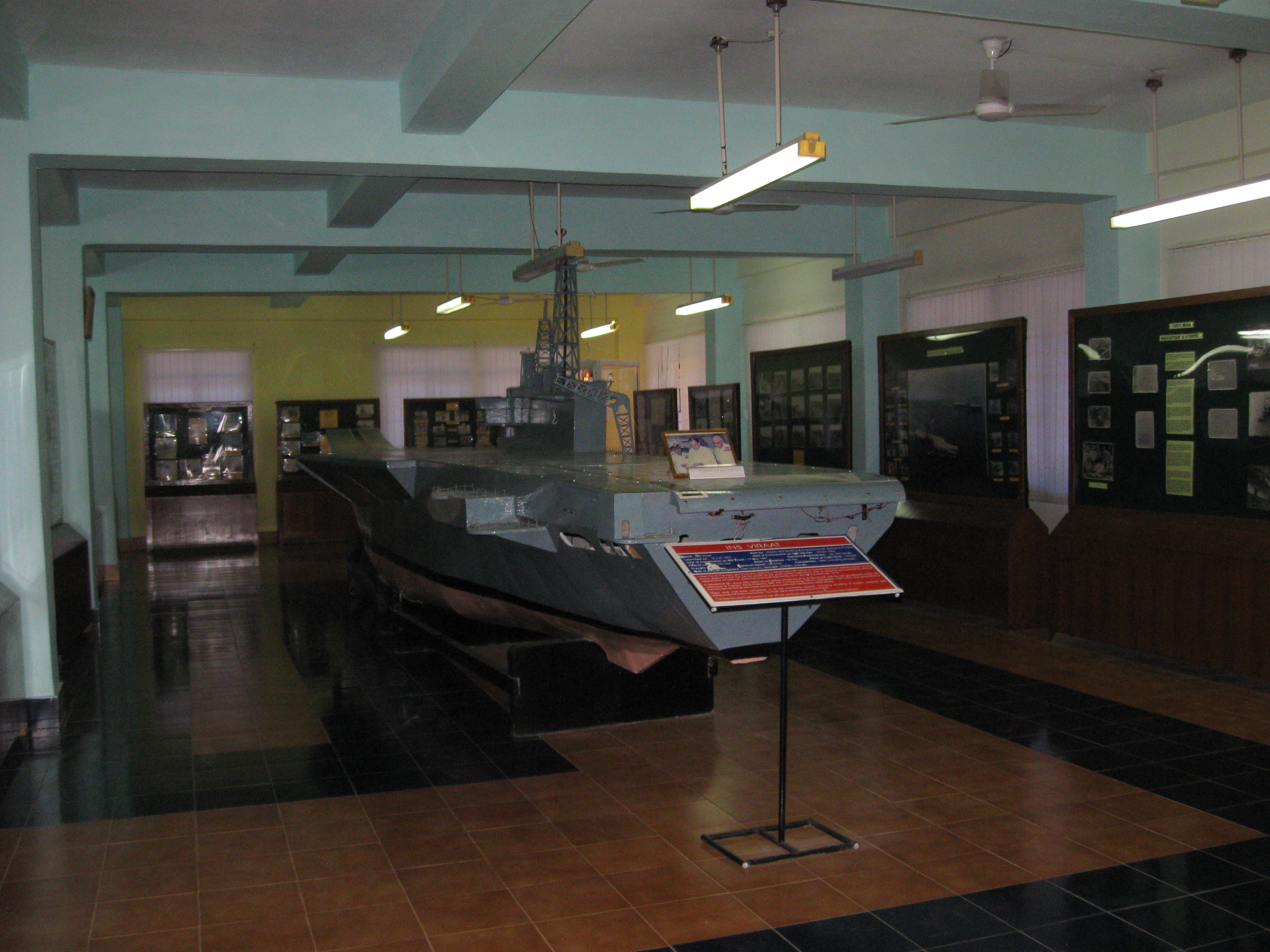
INS Viraat model

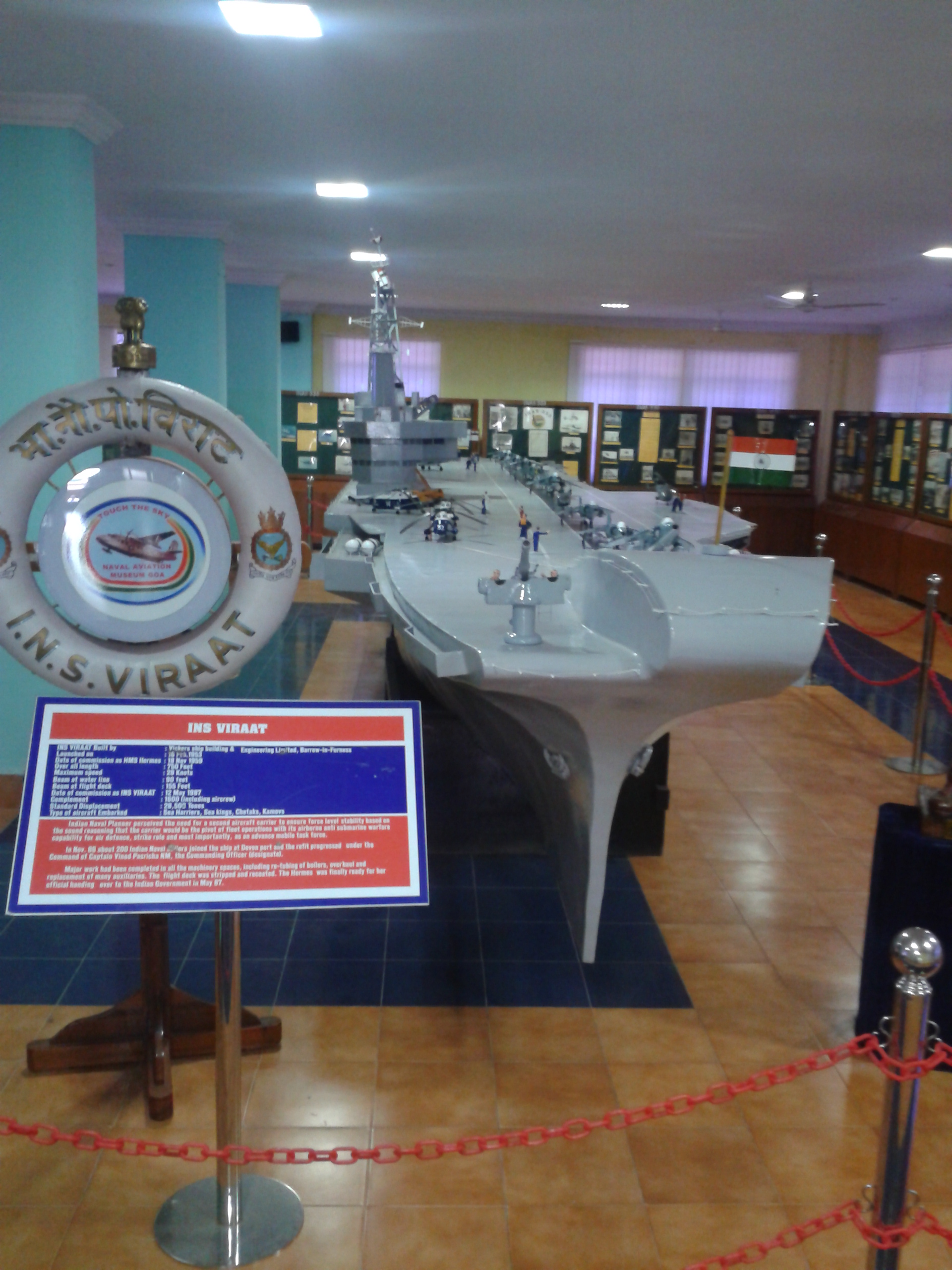
INS Viraat model

== See also ==
- Indian Air Force Museum, Palam
- National Maritime Heritage Complex (Lothal in Gujarat)
- Naval Aircraft Museum (Kolkata)
- Samudrika Naval Marine Museum (Andaman)
