= Samudrika Naval Marine Museum =

- Location: Port Blair, India
- Coordinates: 11.672°N 92.726°E
- Curator: Indian Navy

Samudrika Naval Marine Museum is a museum situated near the Andaman Teal House at Port Blair in India, designed to create awareness on various aspects of the oceanic environment. The museum is maintained by the Indian Navy. The museum has five sections presenting history of Andaman Islands, geographical information, people of Andaman, archaeology, and marine life. It also houses a vast collection of cells, corals and a few species of colourful fishes of the sea around the islands.

== See also ==
- National Maritime Heritage Complex (Lothal in Gujarat)
- Naval Aircraft Museum (Kolkata)
- Naval Aviation Museum (Goa)
