= Indian Air Force Heritage Museum, Chandigarh =

Aerospace museum in Chandigarh, India

- Established: 8 May 2023
- Dissolved: 30°45′N 76°47′E
- Location: Chandigarh
- Type: Aviation museum

The Indian Air Force Heritage Museum, located at Chandigarh is India's first air force heritage centre. Opened in May 2023, it showcases the role of Indian Air Force (IAF) in all the wars and is equipped with modern paraphernalia like virtual reality, augmented reality, hologram, simulators and electro mechanical enclosures.

== Overview ==
The heritage center was inaugurated on 8 May 2023 by Indian Union Defence Minister Rajnath Singh, and is built on an area of 15,600 square feet. Located in Sector 18, the Chandigarh Administration is in charge of running the IAF Heritage Centre. It has five decommissioned aircraft on display, including a HAL HPT-32 Deepak Pilot training aircraft, a MiG-21 single-seat fighter and a Folland Gnat aircraft . Also, the Air Force Kanpur 1, built in 1958 by Air Vice Marshal Harjinder Singh, is present. The centre shows how the Indian Air Force participated in numerous conflicts, such as the Kargil conflicts in 1947, 1948, 1965, and 1971 and 2019 Balakot airstrike.

Additionally, the center houses flight simulators that let visitors experience flying. The SAM-III Pechora missiles are another main attraction. It also has a special section honouring female IAF officers for their contributions to national service. The center also has scale models of Prachand helicopter, Netra aircraft, Mi-26, indigenous Tejas fighter jets, Sukhoi Su-30MKI, MiG-29, C-130J Hercules, Il-78MKI aerial refueller, Airbus C-295 and advanced light helicopter-Dhruv. With the aid of murals illustrating major military campaigns, including the IAF's involvement in the 1948 Indo-Pak War and electro-mechanical 3D-dioramas showing the most recent operations, such as the Balakot airstrike, the centre highlights the illustrious history of the IAF.
