= List of displayed McDonnell Douglas F-4 Phantom IIs =

There are many examples of the McDonnell Douglas F-4 Phantom IIs on display around the world, often in aviation museums and at facilities that once operated the McDonnell Douglas F-4 Phantom II. A few F-4s are also preserved as gate guardians, and some are also owned privately.

== Aircraft on display ==
=== Australia ===
On display

F-4E

- 67-0237 – RAAF Museum, Melbourne. An ex-USAF F-4E painted to represent one of the examples flown by the RAAF while awaiting delivery of the F-111.

=== Belgium ===
On display

RF-4C

- 68-0590 – Royal Museum of the Armed Forces and Military History, Brussels.

=== Chile ===
On display

F-4C-21

- 37683 – Museo Nacional Aeronáutico y del Espacio, Santiago. 31 December 1964: first deployed to the 8th TFW GAFB, California; assigned to the 431st TFS. 4 February 1967: assigned to the 366th TFW, Southeast Asia. 15 January 1968: assigned to the 347th TFW. 12 January 1970: transferred to 4452d CCTS, GAFB, CA. 5 April 1972: assigned to the 183d TFG. 10 December 1980: assigned to the 142 CAM Sq, Oregon ANG. 30 March 1995. received in Chile for static display and repainted in SE Asia colors.

=== Czech Republic ===
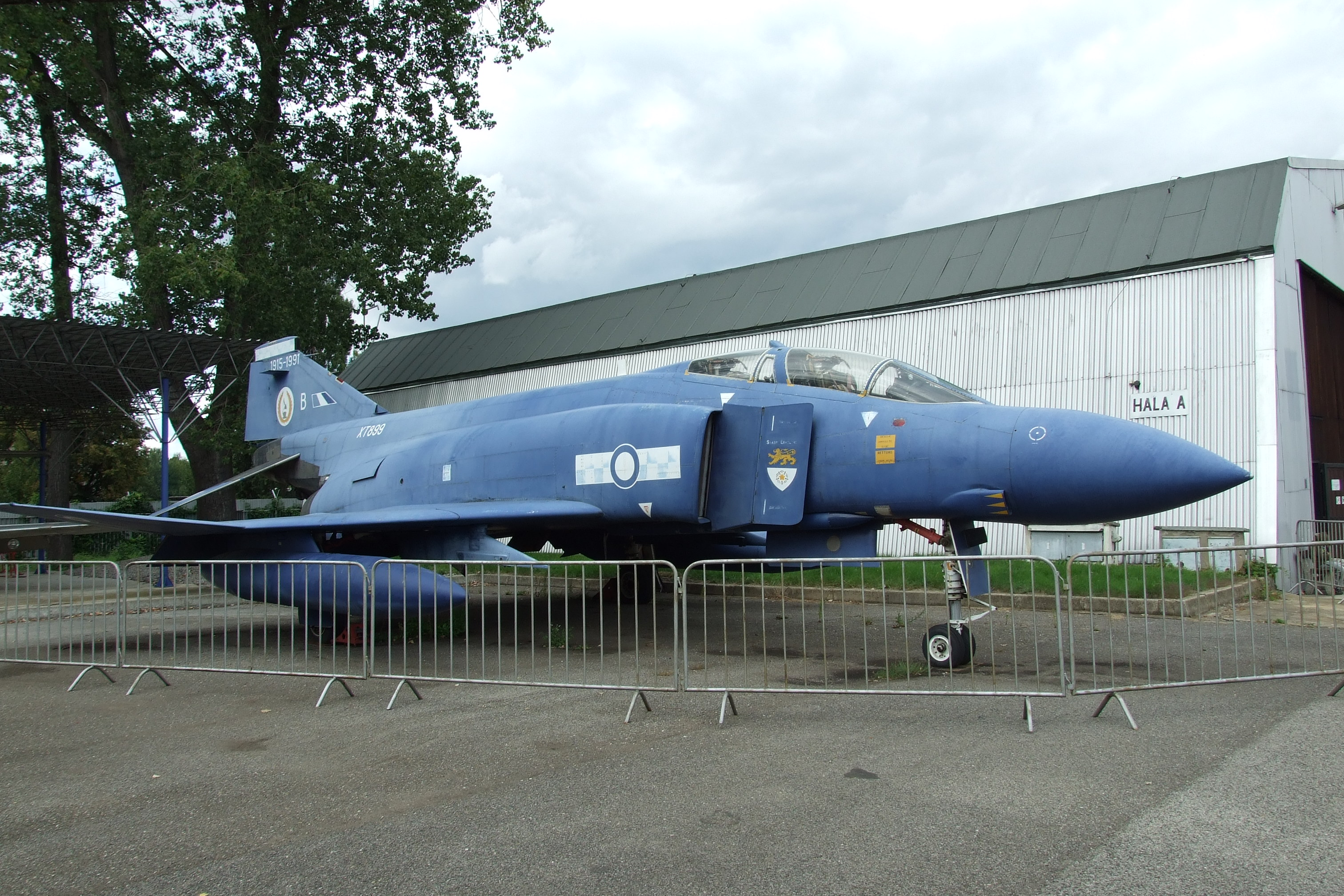
Phantom FGR.2 in the Prague Aviation Museum.

On display

FGR.2

- XT899/B – Prague Aviation Museum, formerly belonging to No. 19 Squadron RAF, then No. 228 OCU, Nos 6, 29, 92, 23, 56 and finally again No. 19 Squadron RAF.

=== Cuba ===
On Display

F-4B (F4H-1)

- 151489 - Guantanamo Bay Naval Station, is currently on display at the Leeward Ferry Landing

=== France ===
On display

- Visible while being restorated at Morbihan Aero Musée, at Vannes-Meucon airport Homepage

=== Germany ===
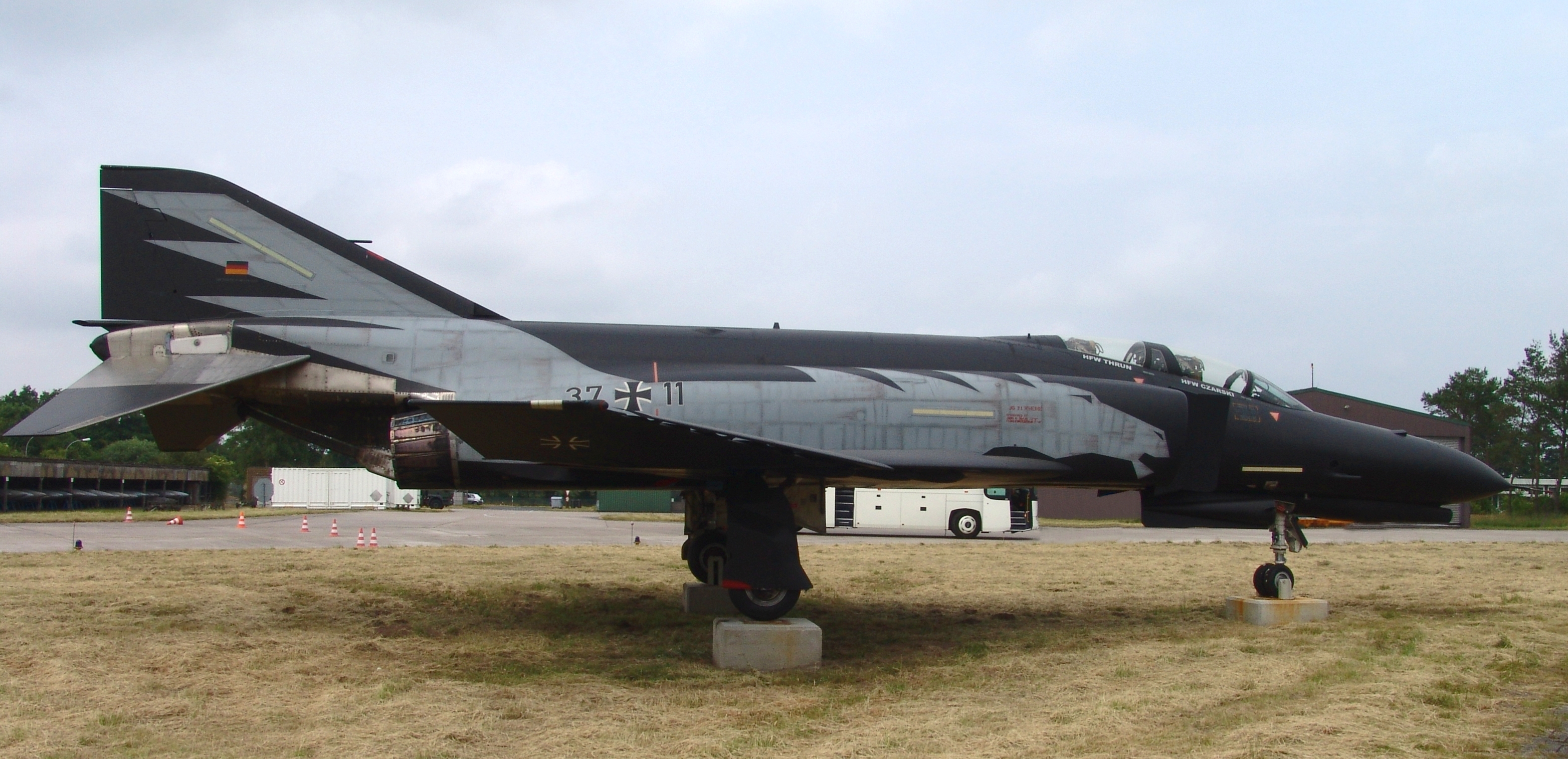
The last Phantom 37+11 of JG72 "Westphalia" in Wittmund, painted entirely in black with the symbol of Westphalia, the white horse, on both sides and the shattered coat of arms of the wing on the bottom.

On display

RF-4E

- 35+62 – Luftwaffe-Museum, Berlin. Former Luftwaffe RF-4E Phantom II.

F-4F

- 38+04 – Luftwaffe-Museum, Berlin. Former Luftwaffe F-4F Phantom II.
- 38+14 – on public display near Wittmundhafen Air Base, Wittmund. Former Luftwaffe F-4F Phantom II.
- 38+34 – Luftwaffe-Museum, Berlin. Former Luftwaffe F-4F Phantom II.

=== Greece ===
On display

RF-4E

- On display in the Hellenic Air Force Museum

=== Guam ===
On display

F-4E

- 1392 – Andersen Air Force Base. F-4E, serial number 71-1392, tailcode "PN" was previously on display at Andersen AFB. 3d Tactical Fighter Wing, 3rd Tactical Fighter Squadron of the Thirteenth Air Force while stationed at Clark Air Base This aircraft was scrapped in August 2022.

=== Iceland ===
On display

F-4E

- 72-1407 – On display as a gate guardian at Keilir Aviation Academy, Keflavik

=== Iran ===
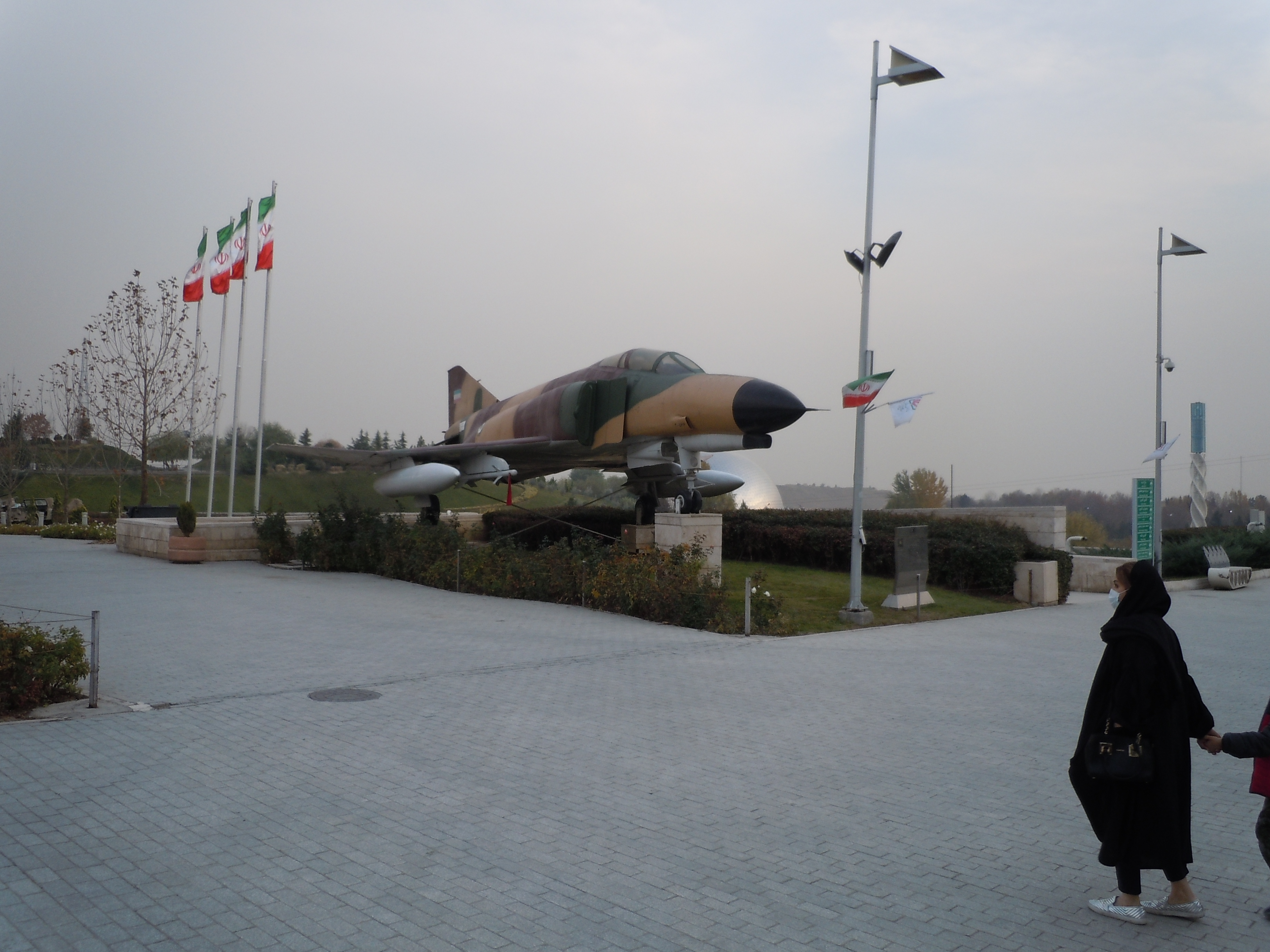
F-4E Holy Defense Museum in Tehran, Iran

On display

F-4E

- Tail Number Obscured - On display at the National Museum of The Islamic Revolution & Holy Defense in Tehran, Iran

=== Israel ===
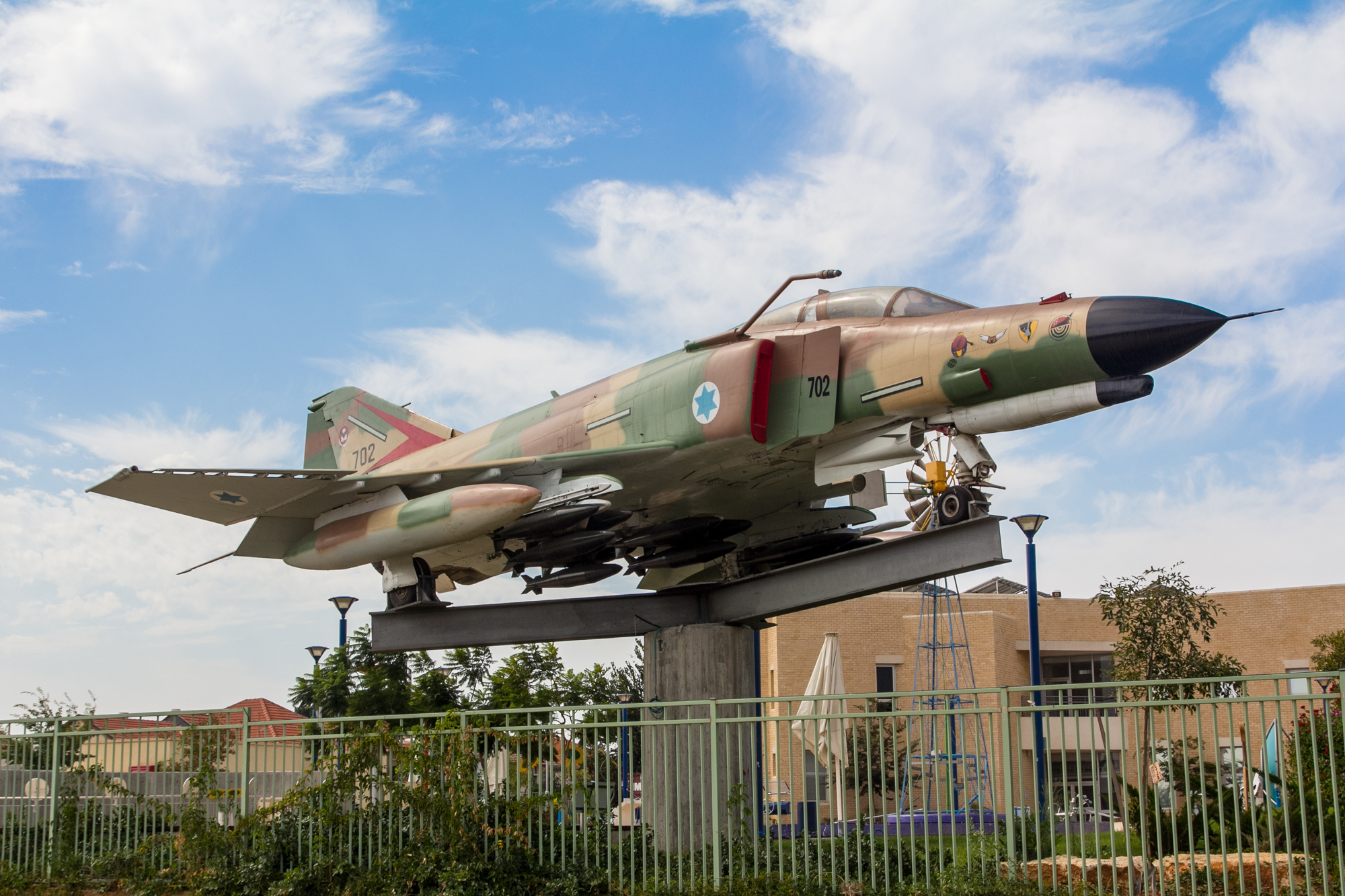
An Israeli F-4E on static display in the Olga's Hill neighborhood of Hadera, Israel

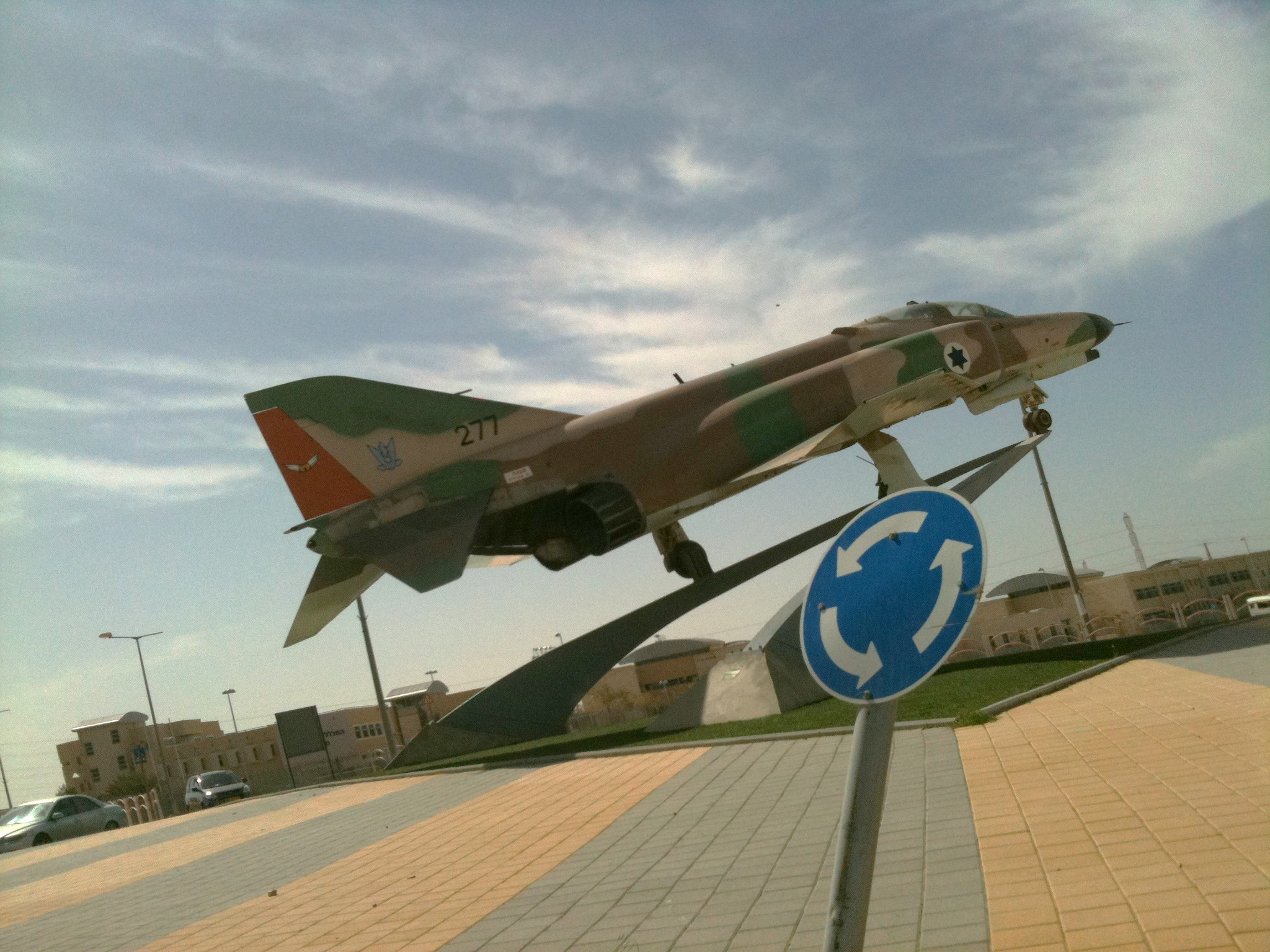
F-4 Phantom II on the IAF Technology College grounds

On display

F-4E

- On display at the Givat Olga neighborhood of Hadera (IDF serial #702 / Construction Number 4289)
- Twenty-one aircraft, including three RF-4E are on display at the Israeli Air Force Museum at Hatzerim Airbase in the Negev desert.
  - F-4E Phantom II, IDF serial #327, Construction Number 3203, United States Air Force s/n 67-0346.
  - F-4E-32-MC Phantom II, IDF serial #334, Construction Number 2954, United States Air Force s/n 66-0327. Prototype Super Phantom, displayed at 1987 Paris Air Show with show number 229, and civilian registration #4X-JPA.
  - F-4E Phantom II, IDF serial #323, Construction Number 3461, United States Air Force s/n 68-0380.
  - F-4E Phantom II, IDF serial #156, Construction Number 3920, United States Air Force s/n 69-7245.
  - RF-4E-44-MC Phantom II, IDF serial #498 (formerly 146), Construction Number 4017, United States Air Force s/n 69-7567.
  - F-4E Phantom II, IDF serial #614, Construction Number 4020, United States Air Force s/n 69-7568.
  - F-4E Phantom II, IDF serial #297, Construction Number 4822, United States Air Force s/n 74-1015.
  - RF-4E Phantom II, IDF serial #485, Construction Number 4930, United States Air Force s/n 75-0418.
  - F-4E-39-MC Phantom II, IDF serial #122 (formerly 22, 622), Construction Number 3529, United States Air Force s/n 68-0417.
  - F-4E-42-MC Phantom II, IDF serial #111 (formerly 11), Construction Number 3840, United States Air Force s/n 69-0299.
  - F-4E-44-MC Phantom II, IDF serial #148 (formerly 648), Construction Number 4021, United States Air Force s/n 69-7569.
  - F-4E-48-MC Phantom II, IDF serial #189, Construction Number 4223, United States Air Force s/n 71-0235.
  - F-4E-49-MC Phantom II, IDF serial #208 (formerly 108), Construction Number 4263, United States Air Force s/n 71-1090.
  - F-4E-41-MC Phantom II, IDF serial #171, Construction Number 3721, United States Air Force s/n 68-0524.
  - F-4E-60-MC Phantom II, IDF serial #295, Construction Number 4817, United States Air Force s/n 74-1014.
  - F-4E-36-MC Phantom II, IDF serial #328, Construction Number 3238, United States Air Force s/n 67-0362.
  - F-4E-41-MC Phantom II, IDF serial #187, Construction Number 3751, United States Air Force s/n 68-0544.
  - RF-4E-45-MC Phantom II, IDF serial #488 (formerly 198), Construction Number 4061, United States Air Force s/n 69-7592.
  - F-4E-53-MC Phantom II, IDF serial #261, Construction Number 4354, United States Air Force s/n 71-1791.
  - F-4E-53-MC Phantom II, IDF serial #266, Construction Number 4391, United States Air Force s/n 71-1792.
  - F-4E-62-MC Phantom II, IDF serial #223, Construction Number 4885, United States Air Force s/n 74-1027.
- One F-4E is on display at the IAF Technological College, Beersheba (tail #277 / serial 4505).

=== Japan ===
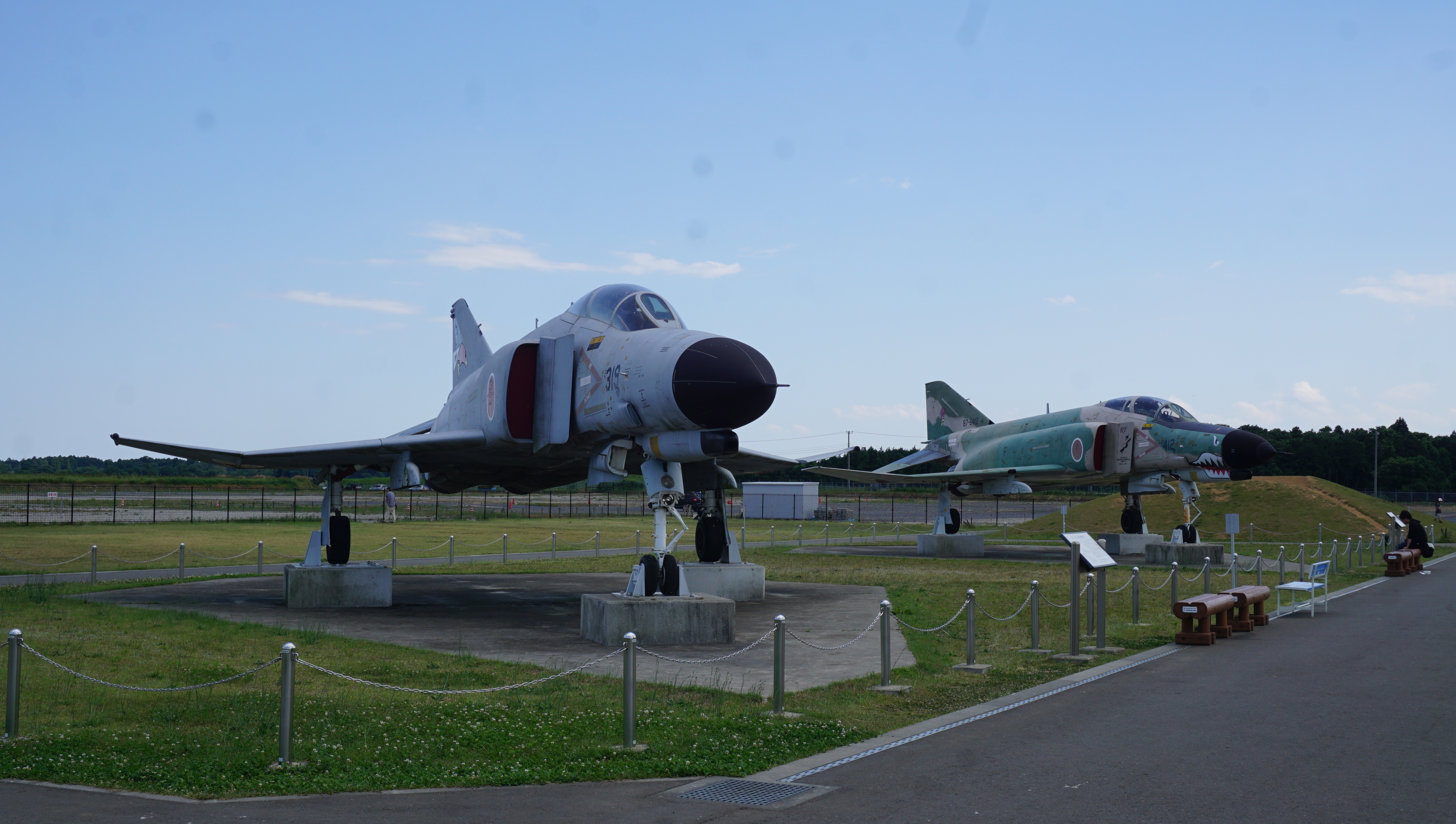
Two preserved JASDF F-4s, an F-4EJ Kai and RF-4EJ Kai, at Ibaraki Airport

F-4C

- 64-0679 – preserved as a gate guardian at Misawa Air Base in Aomori Prefecture.
- 64‐0913 – preserved as a gate guardian at Kadena Air Base in Okinawa Prefecture.

F-4J

- 155807 – preserved as a gate guardian at Naval Air Facility Atsugi in Kanagawa Prefecture.

F-4EJ Kai

- 37-8319 – preserved at Ibaraki Airport, and is situated alongside RF-4EJ Kai 87-6412, having been donated to the airport around the same time as the RF-4EJ.

RF-4EJ Kai

- 87-6412 – preserved at Ibaraki Airport, having been donated to the airport following retirement from 501 Hikotai, which are based at the airport's accompanying Hyakuri Air Base.

=== Republic of Korea ===
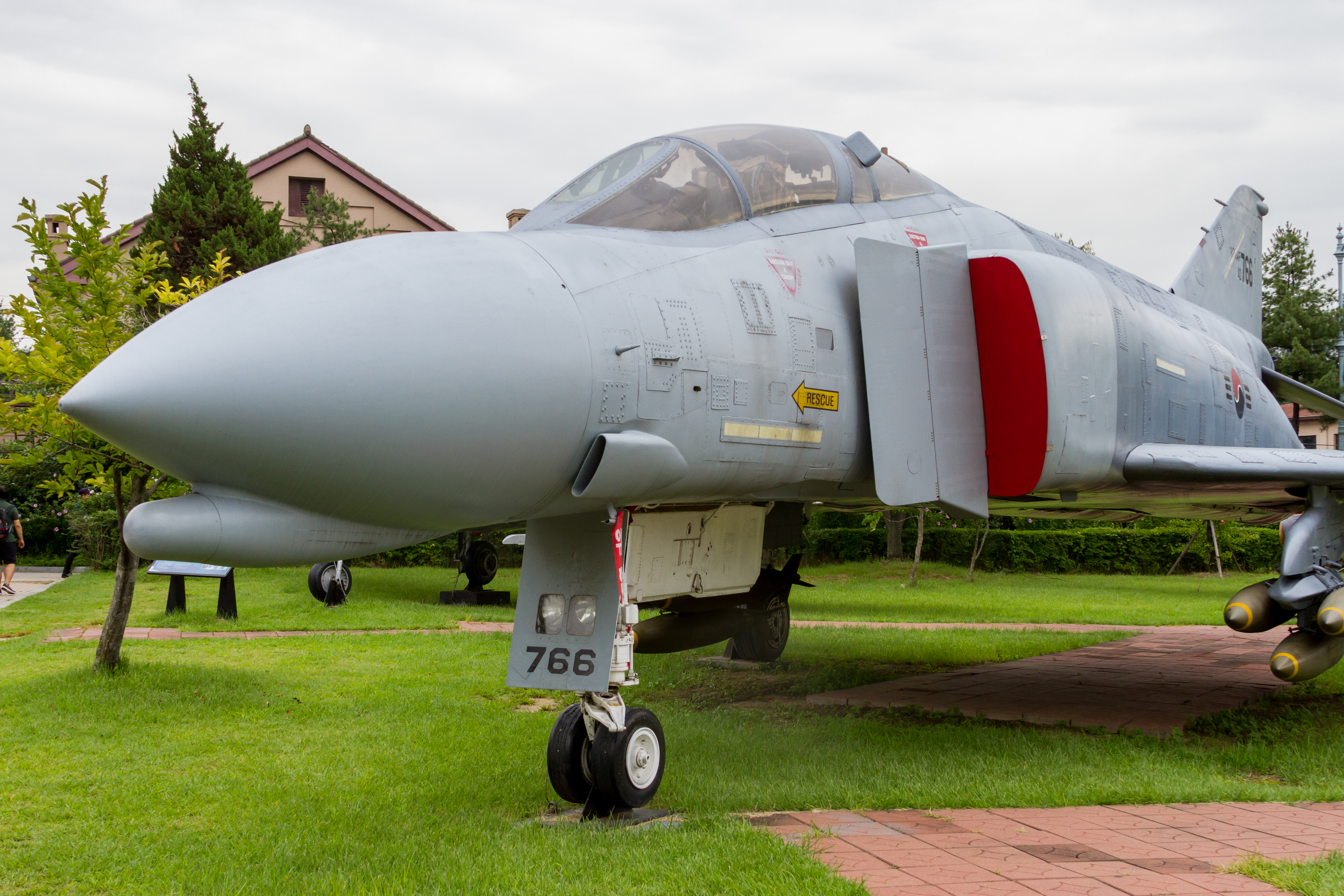
An F-4C Phantom on display at the War Memorial of Korea

F-4C

- 64-0766 – this aircraft served with the USAF's 12th Tactical Fighter Wing in the Vietnam War from 1967 to 1970. It was transferred to the 35th Tactical Fighter Squadron of the 347th Tactical Fighter Wing at Kunsan AB, South Korea. It was later used to train USAF air crews and went on to fly with the Illinois ANG's 170th Tactical Fighter Squadron and the Oregon ANG's 123rd Fighter Interceptor Squadron. After its flying career ended, it was transferred to Suwon AB, South Korea in August 1986 to be used as damage-control trainer before being put on display at the War Memorial of Korea.

=== Slovakia ===
On display

F-4F

- 37+36 – Museum of Aviation, Košice. Former Luftwaffe F-4F Phantom II.

=== Spain ===
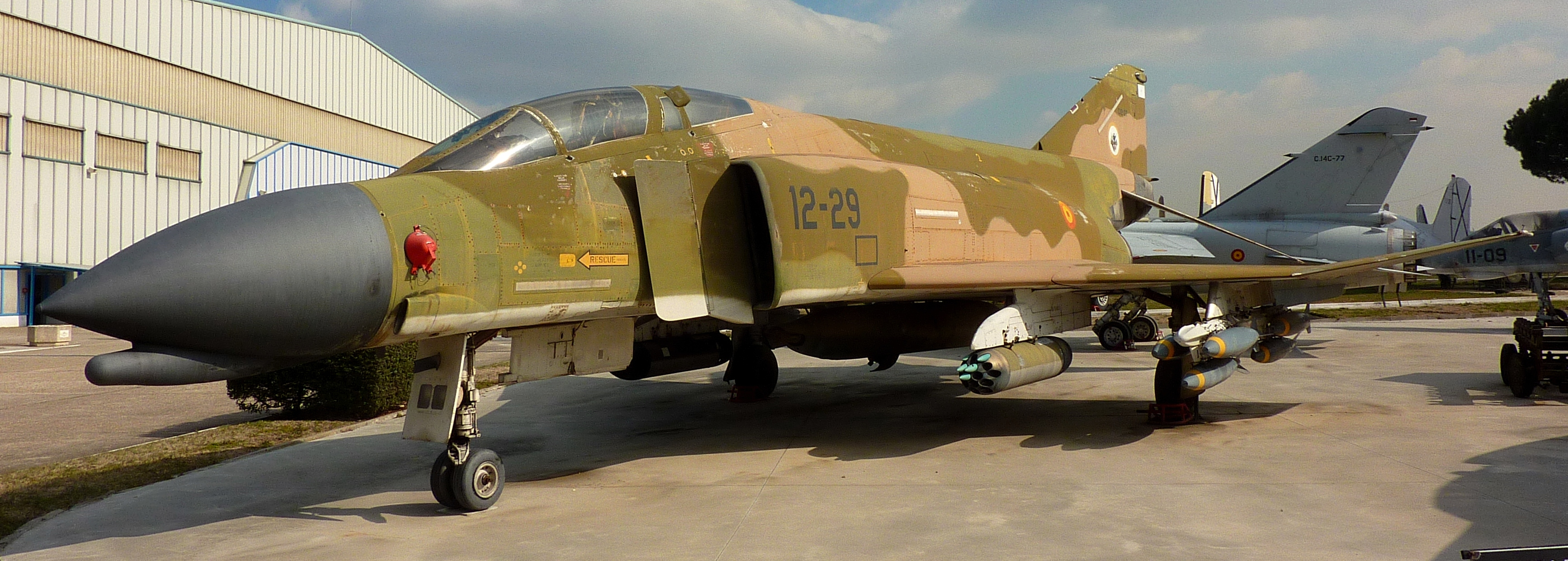
12-29 on display in the Museo del Aire

On display

F-4C

- 12-57, this unit, also from the 12th Wing, was donated by the Spanish Air Force to the local council of Antigüedad (Palencia) as a tribute to the pioneering Spanish military pilots born in the town: the brothers César and Augusto Martín Campos, who fought on opposite sides in the civil war.
- 12-54, that was used for reconnaissance missions in the 12th Wing from the Spanish Air Force, at Torrejón de Ardoz, Community of Madrid.
- 12-29, also from the 12th Wing, in the Spanish Museum of Aeronautics and Astronautics.
- 12-26, also from the 12th Wing, at Sabadell Airport.

=== Turkey ===
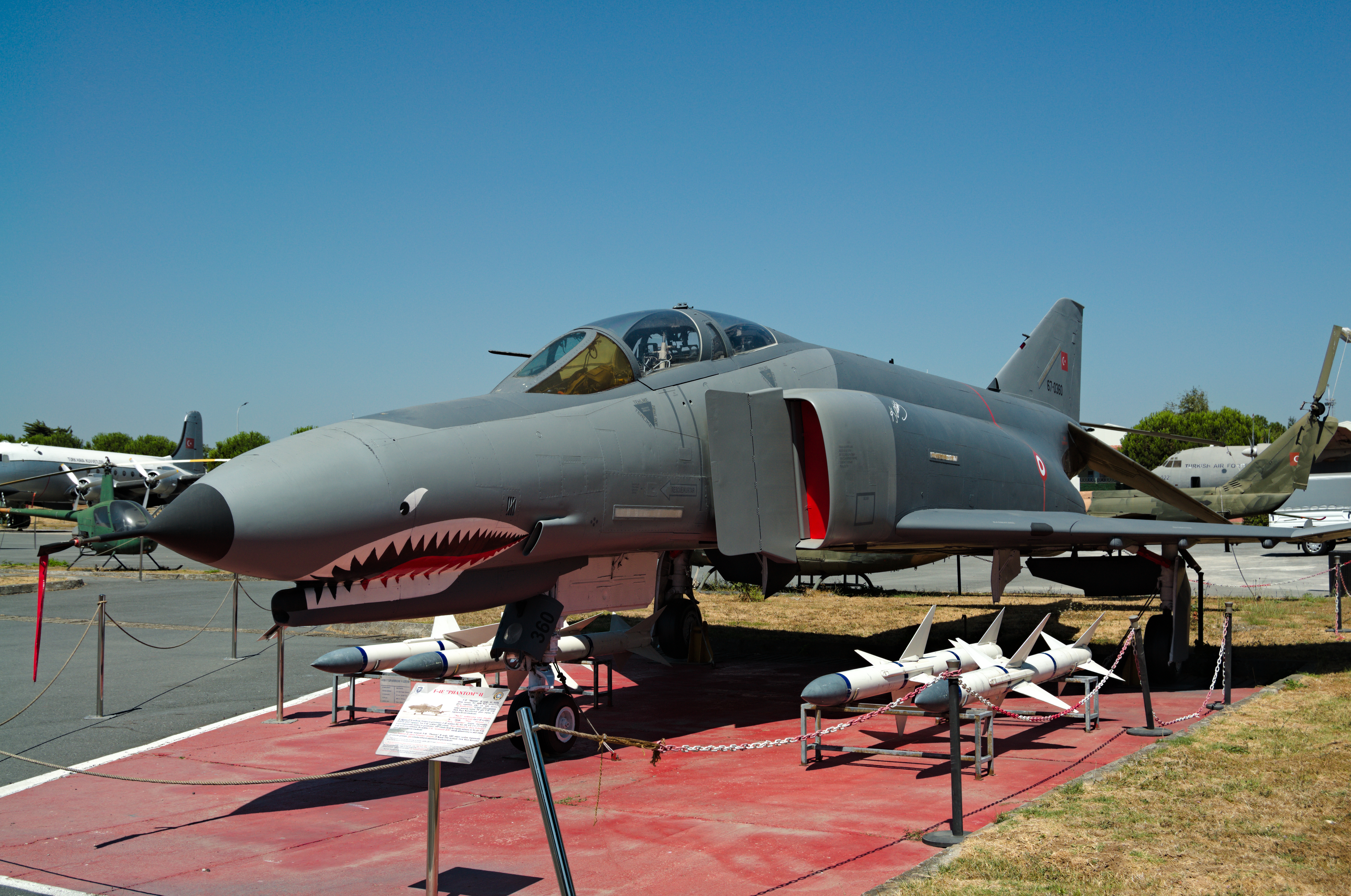
67-0360 in Istanbul, Turkey.

On display

F-4E

- 67-0360, which was upgraded to F-4E/TM Şimşek, at Istanbul Aviation Museum.
- 67-0230 at Ankara Aviation Museum

RF-4E

- 69-7522, which was upgraded to RF-E/TM Işık, at Istanbul Aviation Museum.
- 1-7503 at Ankara Aviation Museum
- 69-7490 at Ankara Aviation Museum
- 67-0232 at Eskişehir Aviation Museum
- 69-7465/1-7465 at Eskişehir Aviation Museum

=== United Kingdom ===
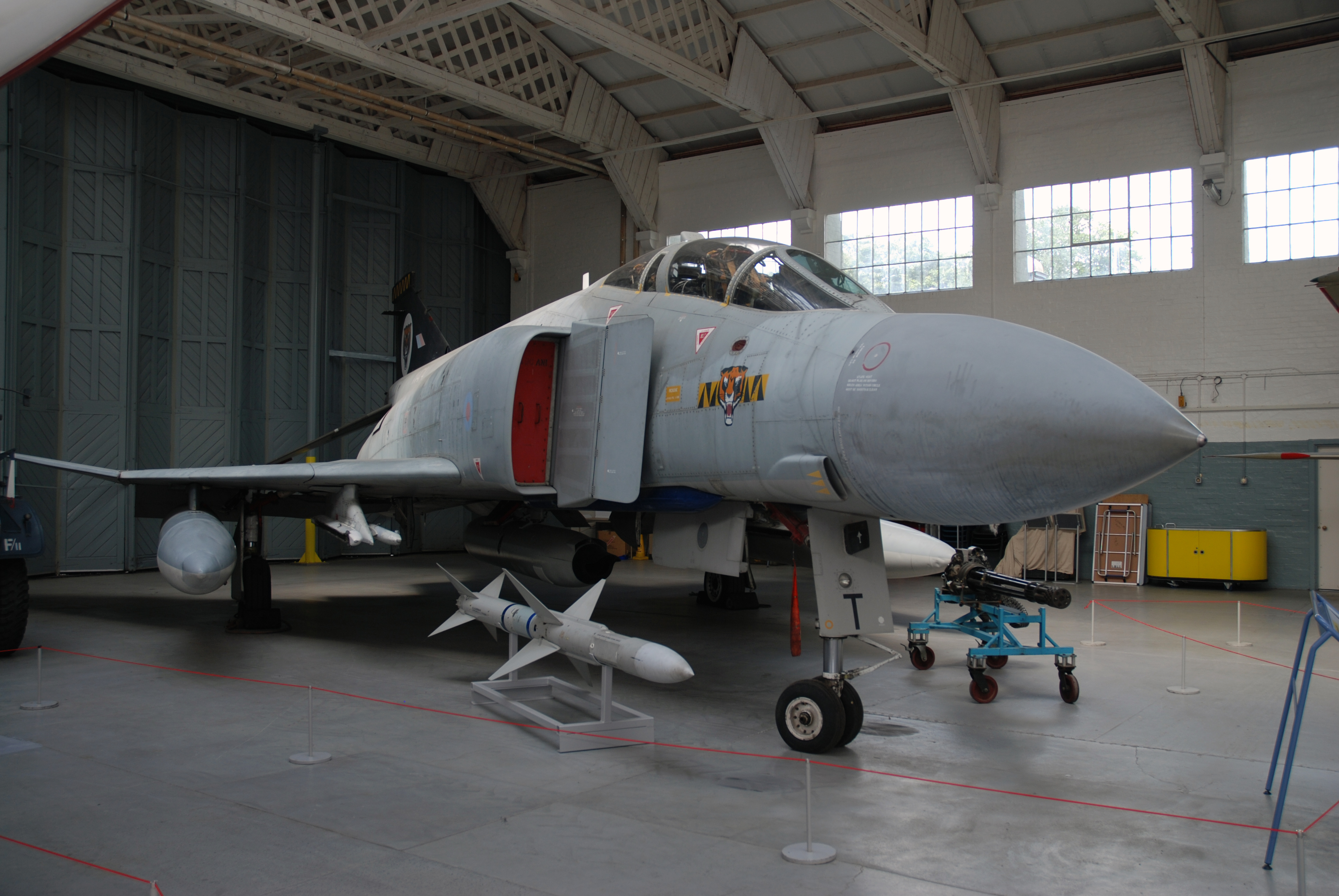
F-4 Phantom II FGR2 XV424 at Imperial War Museum Duxford, Cambridgeshire

On display

F-4C

- 63-7699 (United States Air Force) – Midland Air Museum, Coventry.

F-4K

- XT596 – Fleet Air Arm Museum, Yeovilton.
- XT864 – Ulster Aviation Society, Lisburn.
- XV582 – South Wales Aviation Museum, St Athan.

F-4M

- XT914 – Wattisham Station Heritage Museum, Stowmarket.
- XV401 – Bentwaters Cold War Museum, Woodbridge, Suffolk.
- XV408 – Tangmere Military Aviation Museum, Chichester.
- XV415 – Gate guardian at RAF Boulmer, Alnwick.
- XV424 – Royal Air Force Museum London.
- XV406 – Solway Aviation Museum, Carlisle.
- XV474 - Imperial War Museum, Duxford.
- XV497 – Norfolk and Suffolk Aviation Museum, Flixton.
- XV591 – Royal Air Force Museum Cosford, Cosford, Shropshire.

F-4J(UK)

- 155529 (United States Navy) – Imperial War Museum, Duxford.

F-4S

- 155848 (United States Marine Corps) – National Museum of Flight, East Fortune.

=== United States ===
On display

F-4A (F4H-1F)

- 148252 – Wings of Freedom Aviation Museum, Horsham, Pennsylvania
- 145315 – USS Lexington Museum, Corpus Christi, Texas.
- 148261 – NAS Oceana Air Park, Naval Air Station Oceana, Virginia.
- 148273 – Air Victory Museum, Lumberton, New Jersey.
- 148275 – US Naval Academy, Annapolis, Maryland (last F-4A-4-MC Phantom II).

F-4B (F4H-1)

- 148412 – Heritage in Flight Museum, Lincoln, Illinois.
- 148400 – Hickory Aviation Museum, Hickory, North Carolina.
- 152256 – Wings of Eagles Discovery Center, Horseheads, New York.
- 152986 – Wedell-Williams Aviation & Cypress Sawmill Museum, Patterson, Louisiana.
- 153019 – Naval Air Station Key West, Florida.

RF-4B

- 151981 – Flying Leatherneck Historical Foundation and Aviation Museum, Marine Corps Air Station Miramar, California.
- 157342 – Marine Corps Air Station Cherry Point, North Carolina.
- 157349 – National Naval Aviation Museum, Naval Air Station Pensacola, Florida.

F-4C

- 63-7407 – Air Force Flight Test Museum, Edwards Air Force Base, Edwards, California. First F-4C Accepted for testing by the US Air Force.

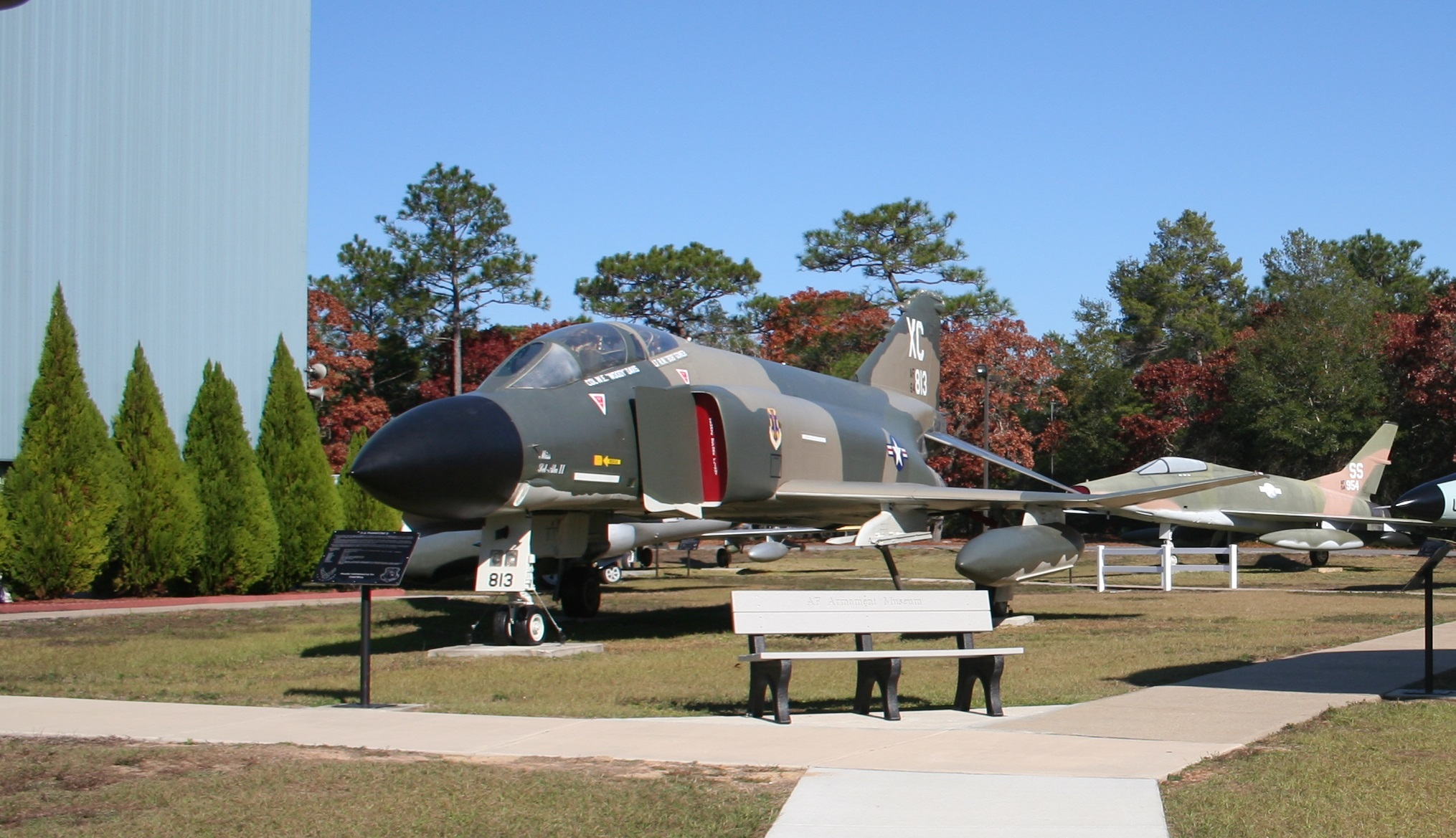
F-4C #64-0813 on display at Eglin AFB

- 63-7408 – Tyndall Air Force Base, Panama City, Florida.
- 63-7415 – Texas Air Museum - Stinson Chapter, Stinson Municipal Airport, San Antonio, Texas.
- 63-7424 – Hill Aerospace Museum, Hill Air Force Base, Utah.
- 63-7482 – Minnesota Air National Guard Museum, Minneapolis-Saint Paul Joint Air Reserve Station, St. Paul, Minnesota.
- 63-7485 – Museum of Aviation, Robins Air Force Base, Warner Robins, Georgia.
- 63-7487 – Battleship Memorial Park, Mobile, Alabama.
- 63-7519 – Southern California Logistics Airport, Victorville, California.
- 63-7534 – Selfridge Military Air Museum, Mount Clemens, Michigan.
- 63-7537 – Holloman Air Force Base, New Mexico.(marked as 67-0535).
- 63-7555 – Yankee Air Museum, Belleville, Michigan.
- 63-7556 – Jackson Barracks Museum, New Orleans, Louisiana Louisiana Air National Guard
- 63-7611 – March Air Reserve Base, Riverside, California - displayed on base, not part of the museum.

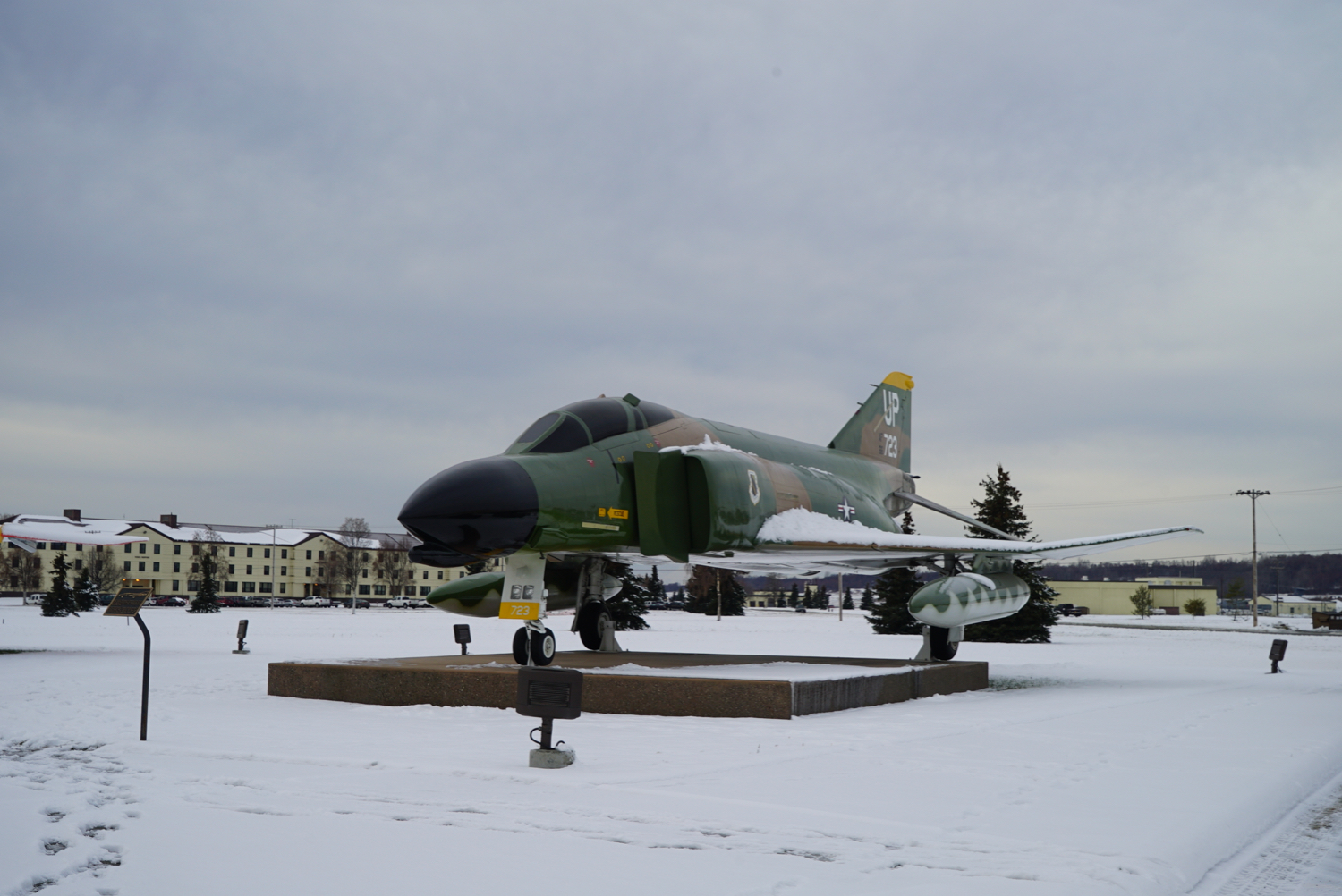
F-4C 63-7628 on display at Joint Base Elmendorf-Richardson

- 63-7628 – Heritage Park at Joint Base Elmendorf–Richardson, Anchorage, Alaska. (Marked as 66-0723)
- 63‐7623 – American Legion, Fairmount, Indiana. It is the aircraft made famous by Pardo's Push.
- 63-7693 – March Field Air Museum, March Air Reserve Base, Riverside, California.
- 63-7704 – Milwaukee Airport, Wisconsin.
- 64-0664 – Hill Aerospace Museum, Hill Air Force Base, Utah.
- 64-0673 – Pima Air & Space Museum (adjacent to Davis-Monthan Air Force Base), Tucson, Arizona.
- 64-0741 – Air Force Flight Test Museum, Edwards Air Force Base, Edwards, California.
- 64-0748 – Langley Air Force Base, Virginia.
- 64-0763 – Air Heritage Aviation Museum in Beaver Falls, Pennsylvania.
- 64-0770 – Seymour Johnson Air Force Base, Goldsboro, North Carolina.
- 64-0776 – Museum of Flight, Seattle, Washington.
- 64-0783 – Grissom Air Museum, Grissom Air Reserve Base, Peru, Indiana.
- 64-0799 – Peterson Air and Space Museum, Peterson Air Force Base, Colorado Springs, Colorado. (marked as 63-7589 of the 57th FIS circa 1978)
- 64-0806 – Nellis Air Force Base, Nevada.
- 64-0813 – Air Force Armament Museum, Eglin Air Force Base, Florida.
- 64-0815 – Mighty Eighth Air Force Museum, Pooler, Georgia.
- 64-0816 – Summerall Parade Field, Charleston, South Carolina.
- 64-0825 – Fort Worth Aviation Museum, Fort Worth, Texas.
- 64-0829 – National Museum of the United States Air Force, Wright-Patterson Air Force Base, Ohio.
- 64-0838 – Aviation Challenge at U.S. Space & Rocket Center, Huntsville, Alabama
- 64-0844 – Bakalar AFB Museum, Columbus, Indiana
- 64-0912 – Tulare County Vietnam War Memorial, Tulare, California.
- 64-0683 – Newark-Heath Airport, Newark, Ohio.

RF-4C

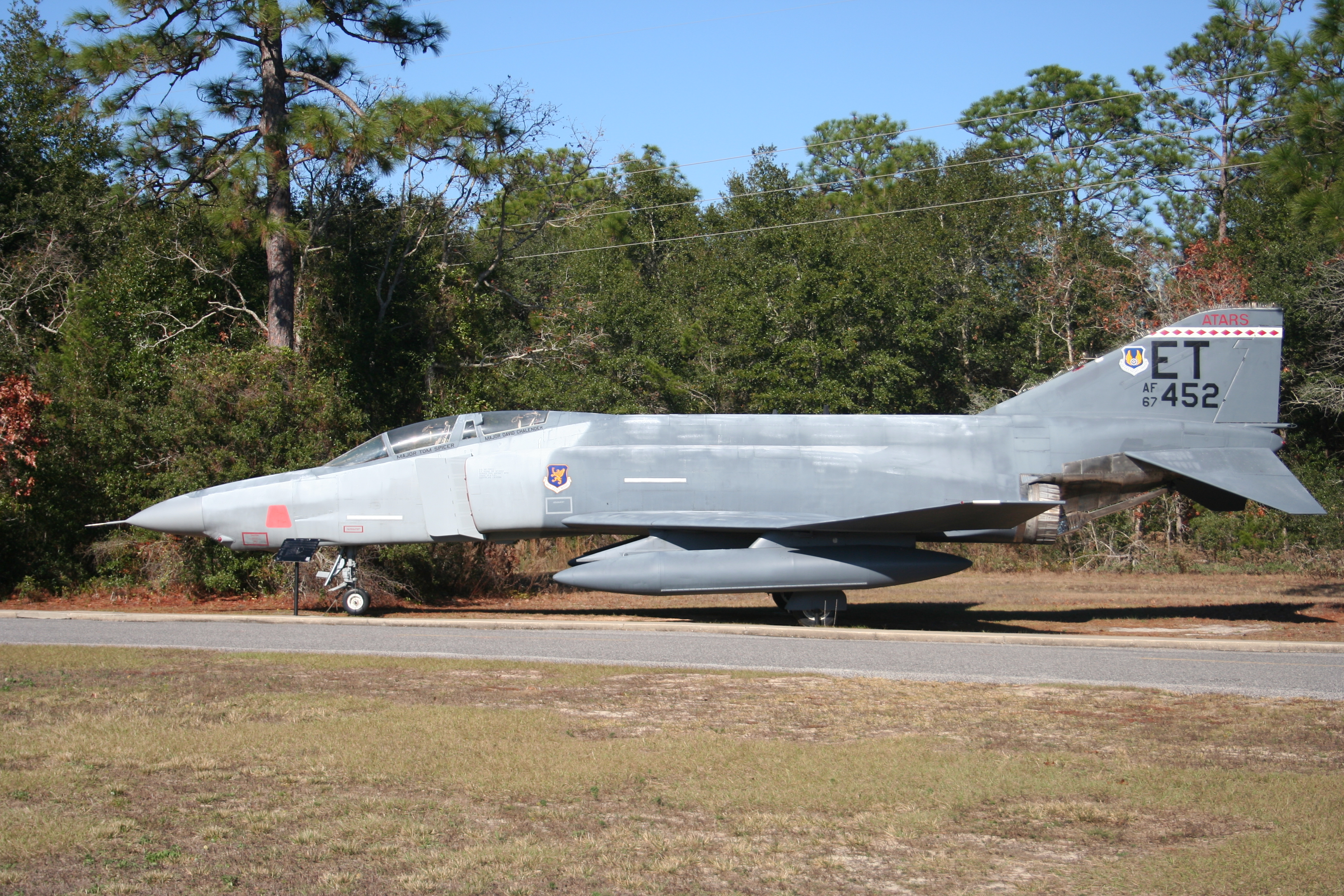
RF-4C #67-0452 at Eglin AFB

- 63-7745 - Birmingham Air National Guard Base, Birmingham, Alabama.
- 63-7746 - March Field Air Museum, March Air Reserve Base, Riverside, California.
- 63-7748 - Shaw Air Force Base, South Carolina.
- 64-0998 - Lincoln Air National Guard Base, Lincoln, Nebraska.
- 64-1000 - Rusty Allen Airport, Lago Vista, Texas.
- 64-1004 - Air Force Flight Test Museum, Edwards Air Force Base, Edwards, California.
- 64-1022 - Susanville Municipal Airport, Susanville, California.
- 64-1047 - National Museum of the United States Air Force, Wright-Patterson Air Force Base, Ohio.
- 64-1061 - Minnesota ANG Museum, Minneapolis-Saint Paul Joint Air Reserve Station, St. Paul, Minnesota.
- 65-0903 - Strategic Air Command & Aerospace Museum, Ashland, Nebraska.
- 66-0456 - Air National Guard Recruiting, Griffiss International Airport, Rome, New York.
- 66-0469 - Hill Aerospace Museum, Hill Air Force Base, Utah.
- 67-0452 - Air Force Armament Museum, Eglin Air Force Base, Florida
- 69-0372 - Air Power Park and Museum, Hampton, Virginia.

NF-4C

- 65-0905 - Hill Aerospace Museum, Hill Air Force Base, Utah.Originally manufactured as NF-4C.

GRF-4C

- 62-12201 - Built as a YRF-110A Spectre, later redesignated RF-4C.It was later modified into the GRF-4FC and used as an experimental aircraft for training purposes. On display at Regional Military Museum, Houma, Louisiana. Formerly on display at Octave Chanute Aerospace Museum (former Chanute Air Force Base), Rantoul, Illinois.

F-4D

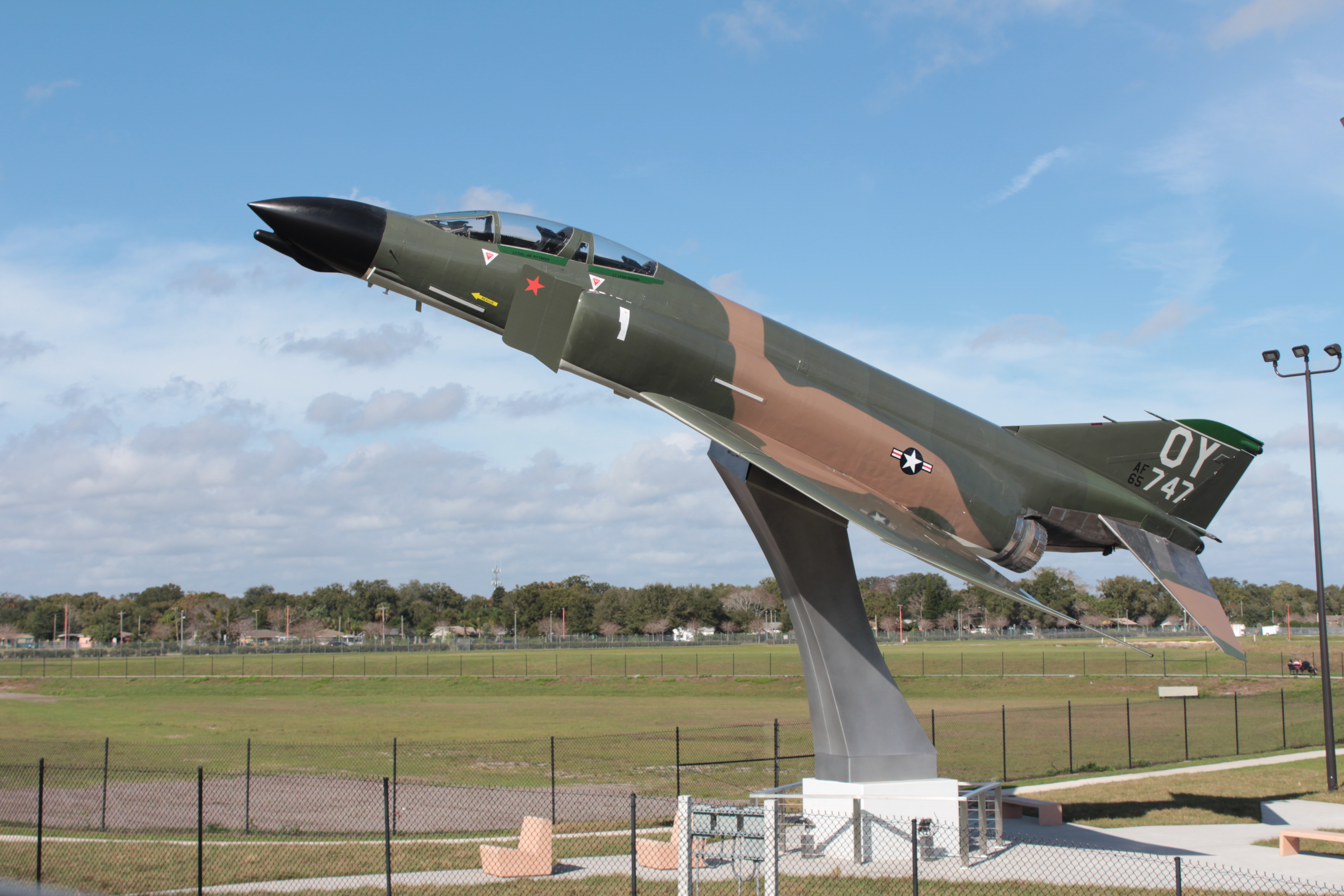
F-4D #65-0747 on display at Kittinger Park

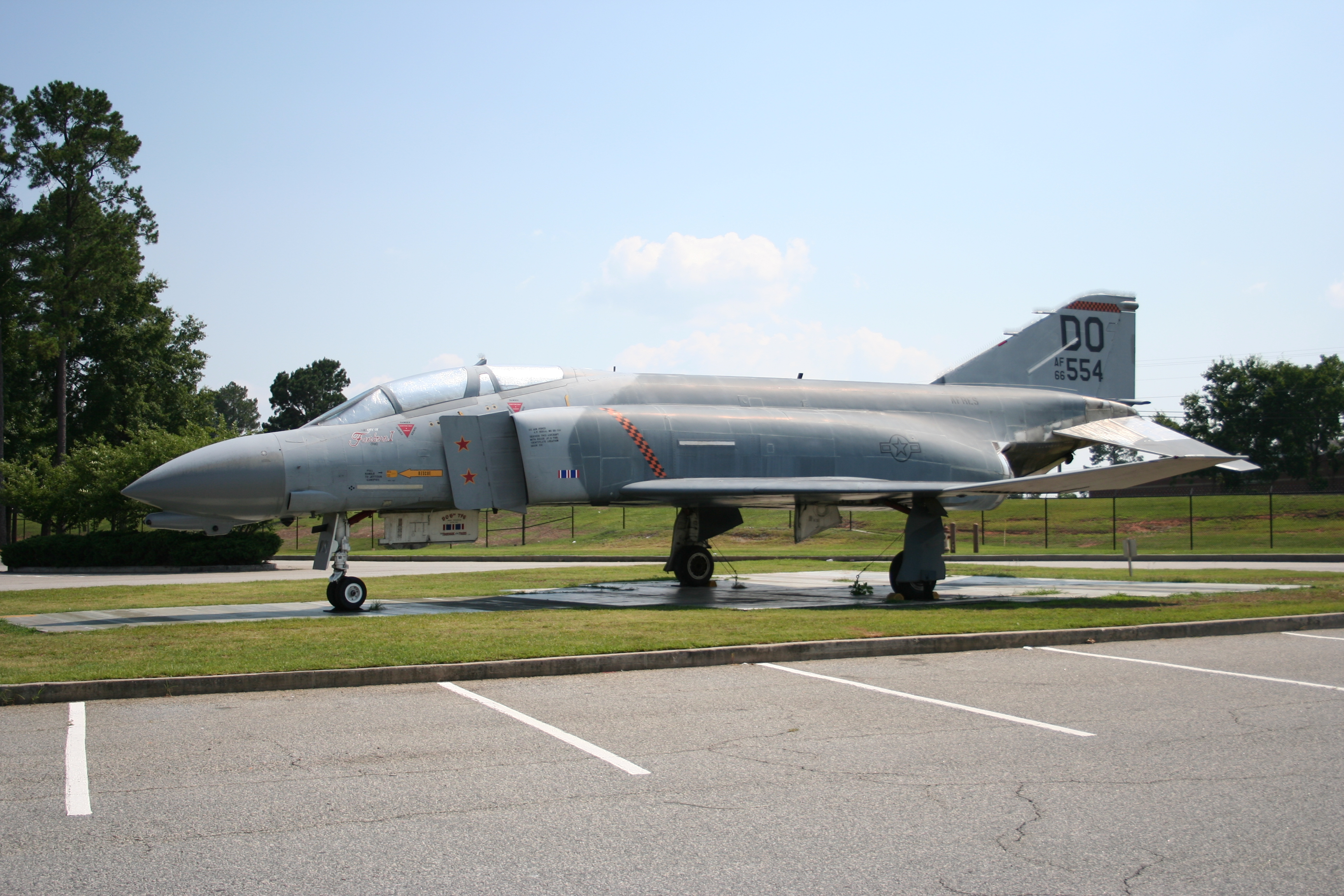
F-4D #66-7554 on display at Robins AFB

- 64-0952 - Aerospace Walk of Honor, Lancaster, California.
- 64-0965 - Van Zandt County Veteran's Memorial, Canton, Texas.
- 65-0626 - Empire State Aerosciences Museum, Glenville, New York.
- 65-0747 - Colonel Joe Kittinger Park at Orlando Executive Airport. Relocated to Orlando Executive Airport, Florida on 22 July 2014 and restored to a Vietnam-era 555th Tactical Fighter Squadron paint scheme on 14 December 2014.
- 65-0796 - William E. Dyess Elementary School, adjacent to Dyess Air Force Base, Abilene, Texas.
- 66-0259 - National Guard Militia Museum of New Jersey, Sea Girt, New Jersey.
- 66-0266 - Ontario Municipal Airport, Oregon.
- 66-0267 - Homestead Air Reserve Base, Florida.
- 66-0269 - New England Air Museum, Windsor Locks, Connecticut.
- 66-0273 - Homestead, Florida; highway median of U.S. 1, just north of 304th Street. Maintenance responsibility remains with 482d Fighter Wing at nearby Homestead ARB.
- 66-7463 - Cadet Area Quadrangle, U.S. Air Force Academy, Colorado. Multiple North Vietnamese Air Force MiG kills by this aircraft while assigned to the 555th Tactical Fighter Squadron during the Vietnam War, including several by USAF fighter aces, retired Brig Gen Steve Ritchie and retired Col Chuck DeBellevue.
- 66-7468 - 183d Fighter Wing, Capital Airport Air National Guard Station, Springfield, Illinois.
- 66-7518 - Charles B. Hall Airpark, Tinker Air Force Base, Oklahoma.
- 66-7550 - Aviation Heritage Park, Bowling Green, Kentucky.
- 66-7554 - Museum of Aviation, Robins Air Force Base, Warner Robins, Georgia.
- 66-7716 - Boron Aerospace Museum, Boron, California.
- 66-8711 - Hill Aerospace Museum, Hill Air Force Base, Utah.
- 66-8755 - Freedom Hill Amphitheatre, Sterling Heights, Michigan.
- 66-8812 - Historic Aviation Memorial Museum, Tyler, Texas.

YF-4E

- 62-12200 - National Museum of the United States Air Force, Wright-Patterson Air Force Base, Ohio.
- 65-0713 - Air Force Flight Test Museum, Edwards Air Force Base, Edwards, California.

F-4E

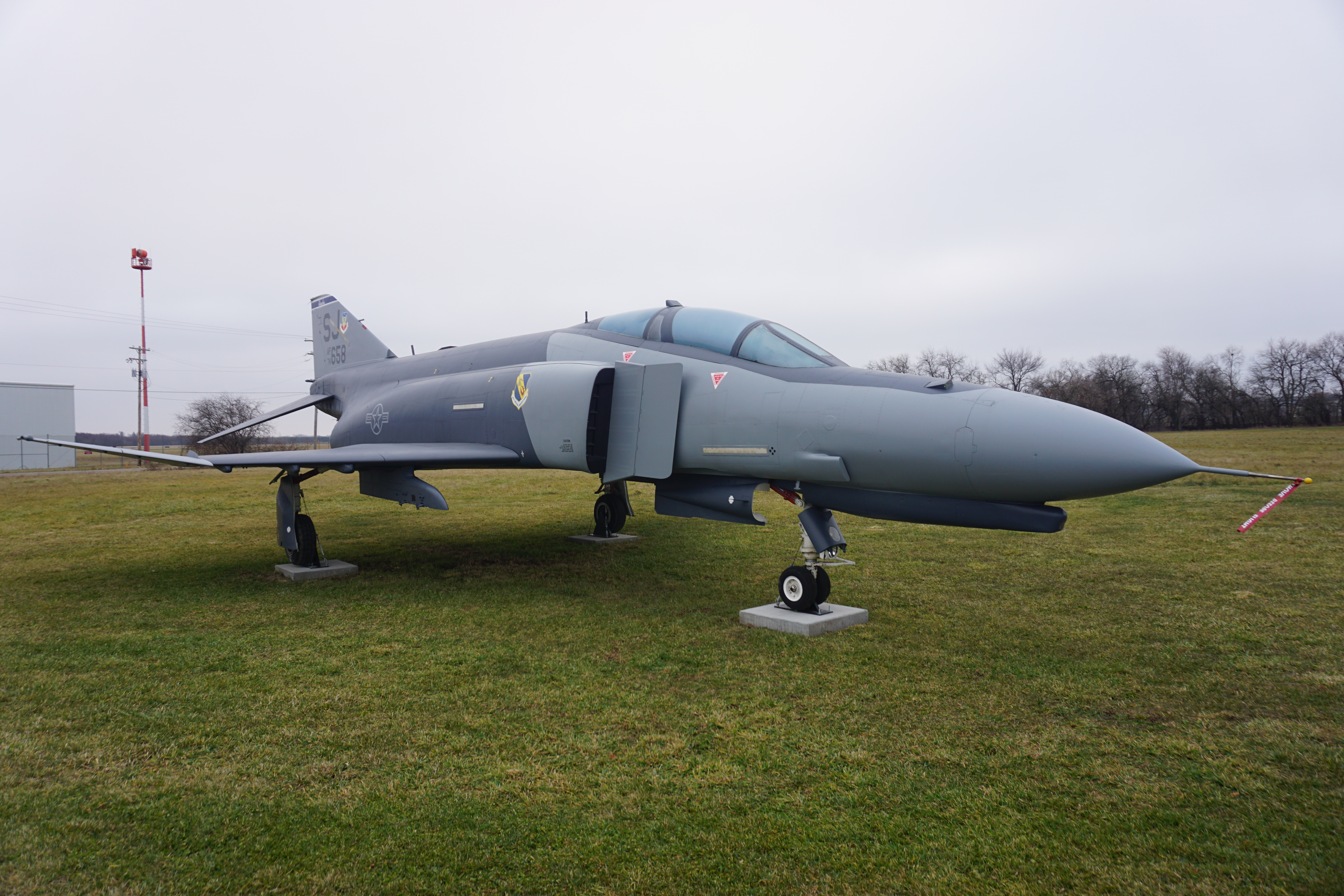
F-4E on display at the Air Zoo

- 66-0284 - Burke Lakefront Airport, Cleveland, Ohio.
- 66-0287 - Wings Over the Rockies Air and Space Museum, Denver, Colorado.
- 66-0315 - Monett, Missouri.
- 66-0329 - Pima Air & Space Museum (adjacent to Davis-Monthan Air Force Base), Tucson, Arizona.
- 66-0368 - Big Spring Vietnam Memorial, Big Spring, Texas.
- 67-0327 - Luke Air Force Base, Arizona.
- 67-0375 - White Settlement Veterans Park, White Settlement, Texas.
- 67-0389 - Baer Field Heritage Air Park, Fort Wayne, Indiana.
- 67-0392 - Virginia Air & Space Center, Hampton, Virginia.
- 68-0304 - Hill Aerospace Museum, Hill Air Force Base, Utah.
- 68-0337 - AMARC "Celebrity Row," Davis-Monthan Air Force Base, Arizona. Five (5) MiG kills ascribed to this aircraft during the Vietnam War.
- 68-0382 - March Field Air Museum, March Air Reserve Base, Riverside, California.
- 71-0247 – Ferra Aerospace, Grove, Oklahoma.
- 74-0649 - Seymour Johnson Air Force Base, Goldsboro, North Carolina.
- 74-0658 - Air Zoo, Kalamazoo, Michigan.

NF-4E

- 66-0289 - Castle Air Museum (former Castle Air Force Base), Atwater, California. It was operated as an F-4E and later used by the Thunderbirds. It was later modified into a test model, the NF-4E. The paint is in the condition of the Thunderbirds era.

YF-4J

- 151473 - Gate guardian at Naval Museum of Armament & Technology, Naval Air Weapons Station China Lake, Ridgecrest, California.
- 151497 - Pima Air & Space Museum (adjacent to Davis-Monthan Air Force Base), Tucson, Arizona.

F-4J

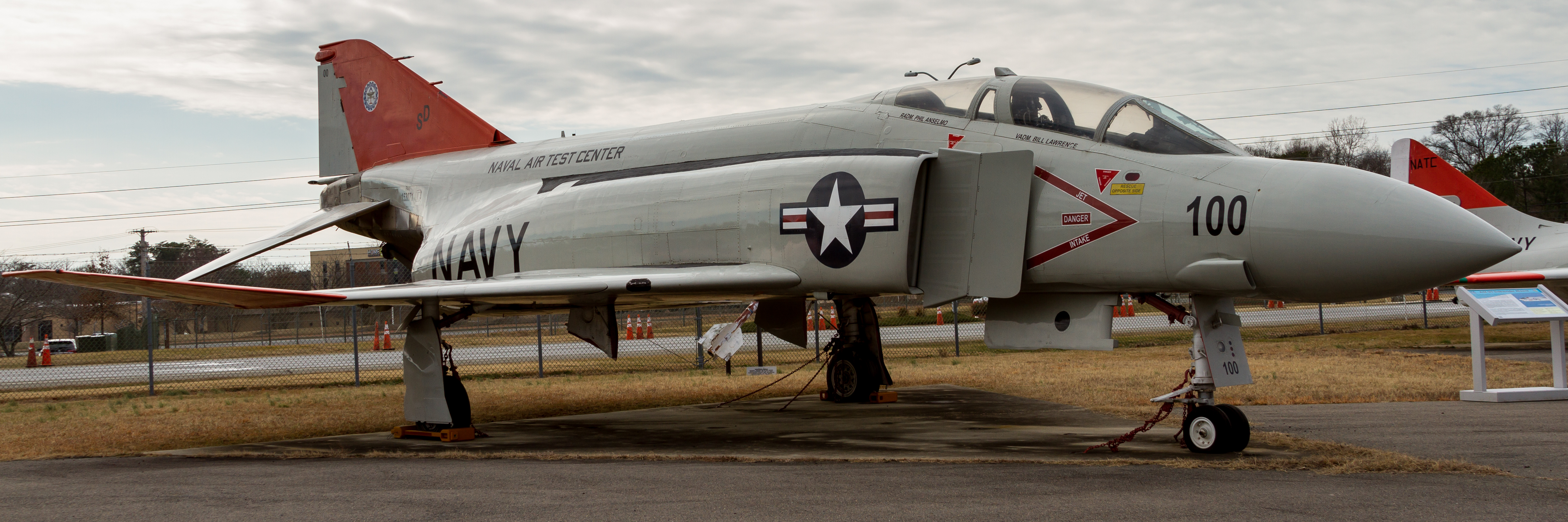
F-4J Phantom II on display at the Patuxent River Naval Air Museum

- 153071 - Patuxent River Naval Air Museum, Naval Air Station Patuxent River, Lexington Park, Maryland.
- 153074 - NAS Lakehurst Air Park, Naval Air Engineering Station Lakehurst, New Jersey.
- 153077 - Patriots Point Naval & Maritime Museum, USS Yorktown (CV-10), Charleston, South Carolina.
- 153088 - American Legion Post #38, Baton Rouge, Louisiana.
- 153812 - Burke Lakefront Airport, Cleveland, Ohio.
- 153889 - MCAS Kaneohe Bay / Marine Corps Base Hawaii (formerly Marine Corps Air Station Kaneohe Bay, Kaneohe, Hawaii.
- 155563 - Valiant Air Command Warbird Museum, Space Coast Regional Airport, Titusville, Florida.

F-4N

F-4S 157259 at Point Mugu NAS

- 150442 - Livingston, Louisiana.
- 150444 - Prairie Aviation Museum, Bloomington, Illinois.
- 150628 / 286 Intrepid Sea, Air & Space Museum, New York NY. Marines VMFA 323
- 150639 - Warrior Park, Davis-Monthan Air Force Base, Arizona. Painted to look like a USAF F-4C with tail number 64-0639.
- 152270 - Marine Corps Air Station Beaufort, South Carolina.
- 152996 - Southern Museum of Flight, Birmingham, Alabama.
- 153016 - Commemorative Air Force/Arizona Wing, Mesa, Arizona.
- 153030 - San Diego Aircraft Carrier Museum, USS Midway (CV-41), San Diego, California.
- 153915 - National Naval Aviation Museum, Naval Air Station Pensacola, Florida.

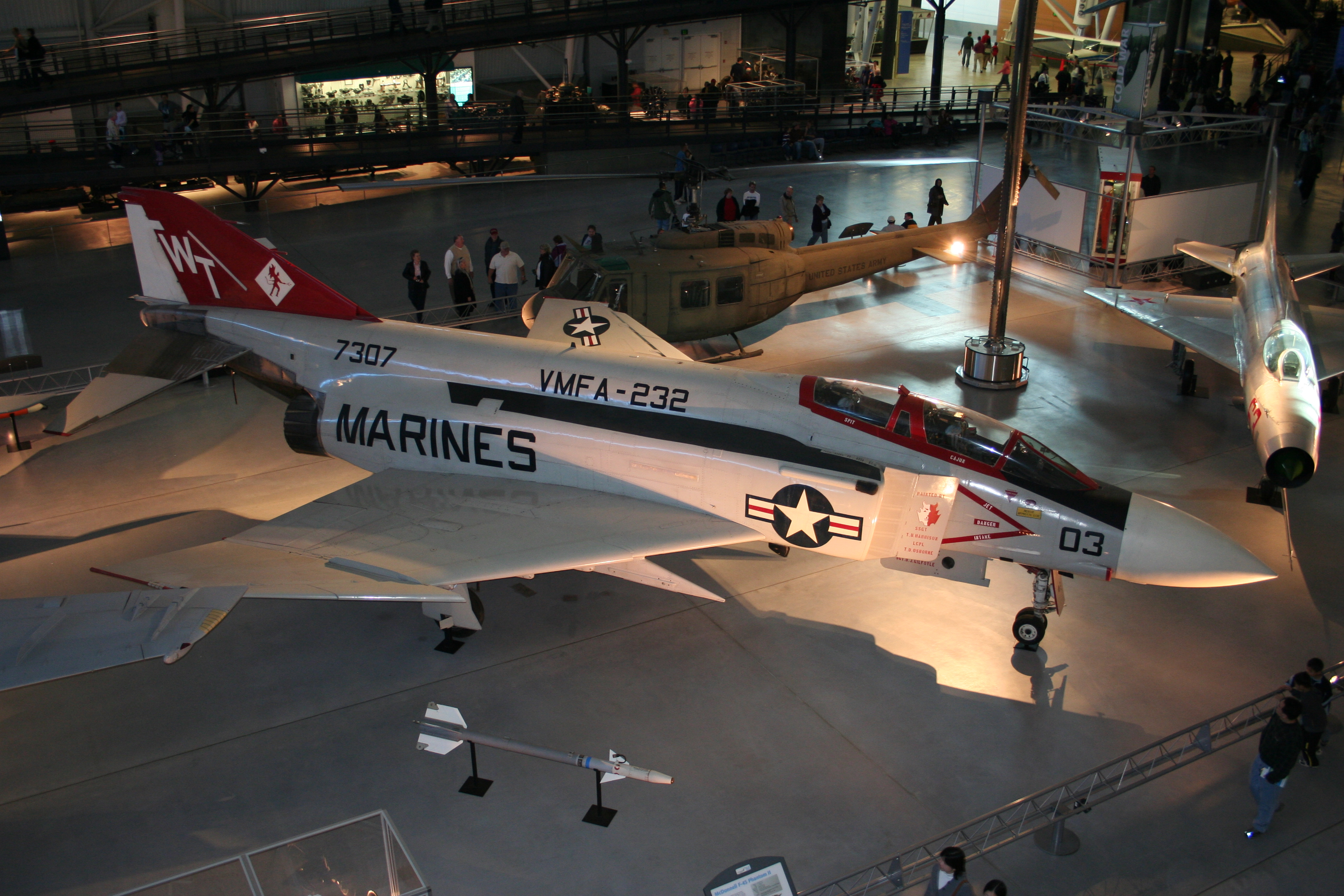
F-4S #157307 at the Steven F. Udvar-Hazy Center, Chantilly, Virginia

F-4S

- 153851 - Palm Springs Air Museum.
- 153879 - USS Hornet Museum.
- 153880 - San Diego Aircraft Carrier Museum, USS Midway (CV-41), San Diego, California.
- 153904 - Aviation Museum of Kentucky, Lexington Blue Grass Airport/Bowman Field, Lexington, Kentucky.
- 155764 - MAPS Air Museum, Canton, Ohio. It is displayed with the main wings folded.
- 155872 - Carolinas Aviation Museum, Charlotte Douglas International Airport, Charlotte, North Carolina.
- 155890 - Estrella Warbird Museum, Paso Robles Municipal Airport, Paso Robles, California.
- 155900 - Veterans of Foreign Wars (VFW) Post 8483.
- 157246 - Flying Leatherneck Aviation Museum, Marine Corps Air Station Miramar, California.
- 157259 - Point Mugu Missile Park, Naval Air Station Point Mugu, California. Exhibited in flight with the landing gear retracted and fixed to the pedestal.
- 157267 - San Diego Aerospace Museum, San Diego, California. Exhibited in flight with the landing gear retracted and fixed to the pedestal.
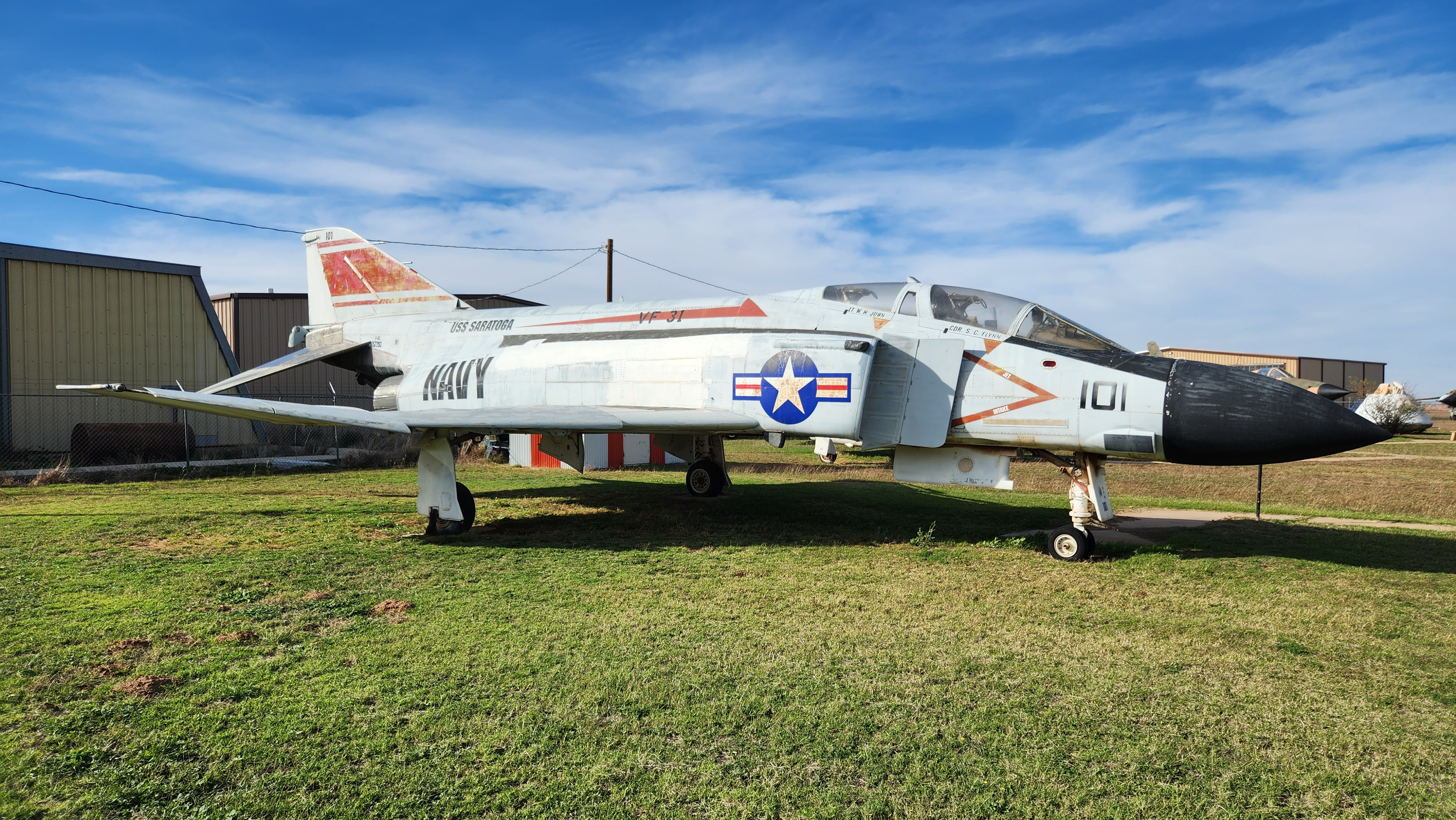
- F-4S #157293 at the Texas Air Museum in Slaton, Texas.
  157293 - Texas Air Museum in Slaton, Texas
- 157307 - Steven F. Udvar-Hazy Center, Chantilly, Virginia

QF-4S

- 153821 - Fort Worth Aviation Museum, Fort Worth, Texas.

In storage

F-4C

- 64-0777 – Cavanaugh Flight Museum, Addison, Texas. Removed from public display when the museum indefinitely closed on 1 January 2024.

Under restoration

F4H-1

- 145310 – Under restoration to airworthy with F4 Phantom II Corporation in Santa Fe, New Mexico. It was previously located at the Wings and Rotors Air Museum in Murrieta, California.
