= Fort Worth Aviation Museum =

- Former name: Veterans Memorial Air Park
- Location: Fort Worth, Texas, United States
- Coordinates: 32.805655°N 97.355540°W
- Type: Aviation museum
- Director: Jim Hodgson
- Website: www.fortworthaviationmuseum.com

The Fort Worth Aviation Museum is an aviation museum located next to Meacham International Airport in Fort Worth, Texas. The museum was rebranded in 2013 and was previously known as the Veterans Memorial Air Park.

== Mission ==
The Fort Worth Aviation Museum (FWAM) is dedicated to preserving and promoting the history of aviation in Fort Worth, the North Texas region, and around the world. The museum displays aviation artifacts and provides historical interpretation on a variety of civil and military topics. FWAM operates under the charter of the OV-10 Bronco Association, Inc., a 501(c)(3) not for profit corporation.

In addition to an air park with twenty-four airplanes, FWAM houses two museums. Along with the B-36 Peacemaker Museum, the Forward Air Controllers' Museum tells the stories of Forward Air Control (FAC) used in Close Air Support (CAS), the history of the North American Rockwell OV-10 Bronco, and the history of aviation in North Texas with an emphasis on Air Force Plant 4 (currently operated by Lockheed Martin).

FWAM's motto is "Bringing Aviation History to Life", and its mission is summarized as "Preservation, Inspiration, Education", or PIE.

== History ==
The museum acquired an F-100F and the sole surviving F6U in 2025.

The museum was damaged by hail in late April 2026.

== Aircraft ==
The VMAP aircraft collection consists of twenty-five warbirds dating from 1943 to the present:

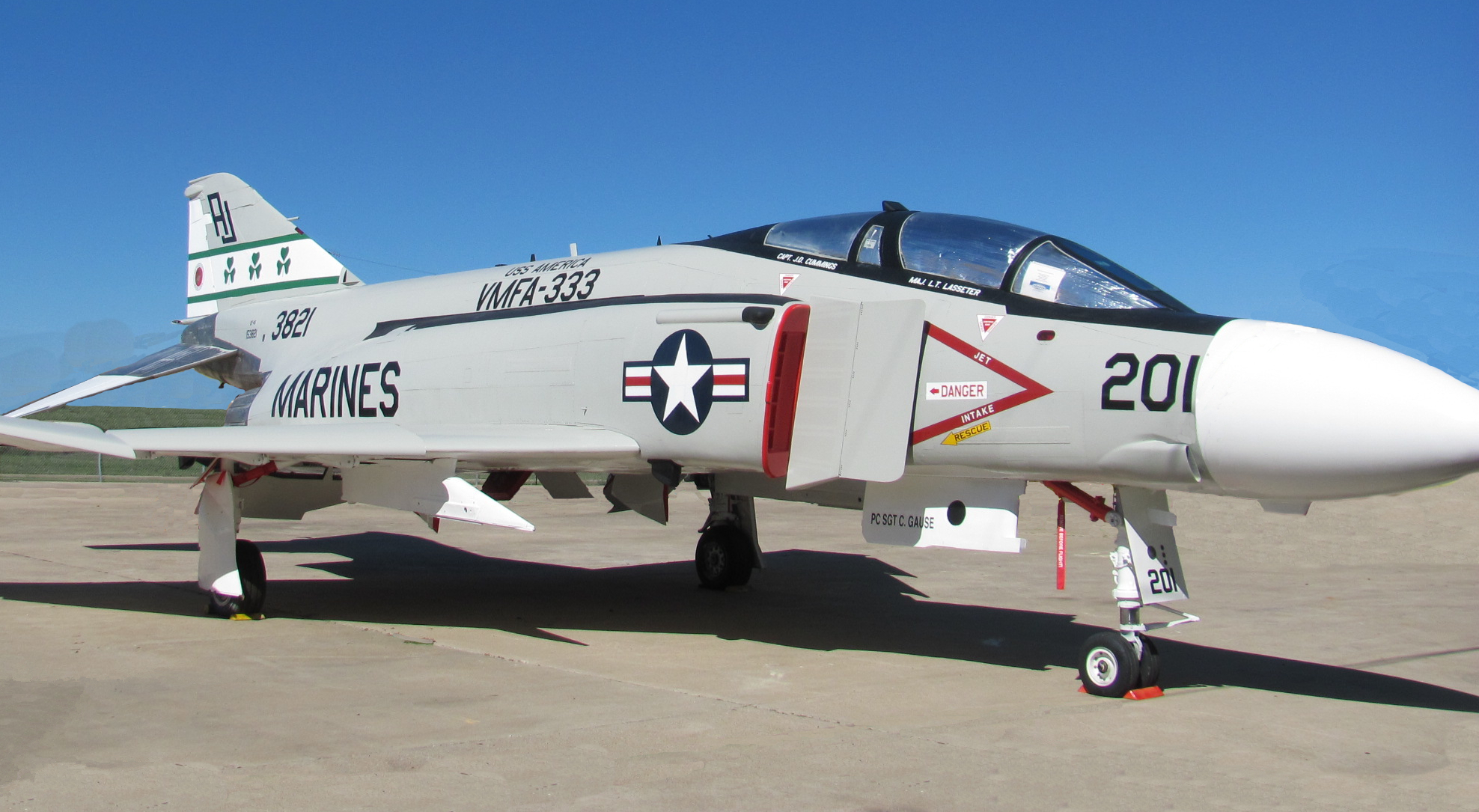
A newly restored McDonnell-Douglas F-4 Phantom II at the Fort Worth Aviation Museum in the colors of VMFA-333 in 2013.

Model	Manufacturer	Serial #	Notes
A-4 Skyhawk	Douglas	147715	type: A-4C
A-4 Skyhawk	Douglas	158073	type: TA-4J
A-7 Corsair	Ling-Temco-Vought	154479	type: A-7B
A-12 Avenger	McDonnell Douglas; General Dynamics	Mockup	nickname: "Flying Dorito"
BT-13 Valiant	Vultee	8408	year: 1943
CH-53 Sea Stallion	Sikorsky	153715	type: CH-53A; nickname: "Patches"
F-4 Phantom	McDonnell Douglas	64-0825	type: F-4C
F-4 Phantom	McDonnell Douglas	153821	type: QF-4S; nickname: "Shamrock 201"
F-5 Tiger	Northrop	74-1558	type: F-5E Tiger II
F-8 Crusader	Vought	146898	type: RF-8G
F-14 Tomcat	Grumman	159600	type: F-14D; nickname: "Christine"
F-18 Hornet	McDonnell Douglas	162826	type: F/A-18; former Blue Angels airplane
F-102 Delta Dagger	Convair	56-2337	type: TF-102A; nickname: "Hewy"
F-105 Thunderchief	Republic Aviation	60-5385	type: F-105D; nickname: "Fireball Express"
F-111 Aardvark	General Dynamics	68-0009	type: F-111E; nickname: "Balls 9"
O-1 Bird Dog	Cessna	51-16953	type: O1-A (L-19A)
O-2 Skymaster	Cessna	N/A	type: O-2A; nickname: "Kudy Jay"
O-2 Skymaster	Cessna	67-21430	type: O-2A
OH-58 Kiowa	Bell Helicopter	71-20606	type: OH-58A
OV-1 Mohawk	Grumman	69-17021	type: OV-1D Mohawk
OV-10 Bronco	North American; Rockwell	Mockup	type: OV-10A; original factory mockup
OV-10 Bronco	North American; Rockwell	68-03825	type: OV-10A
OV-10 Bronco	North American; Rockwell	155426	type: OV-10A
T-33 Shooting Star	Lockheed	53-5215	type: T-33A
T-37 Tweet	Cessna	57-2261	type: T-37A

== Programs ==
=== Landmark and Historic Sites Report ===
To expand community knowledge of aviation and it cultural and economic impacts on North Texas, the FWAM prepared a list of North Texas Aviation Landmarks and Sites. The list outlines twenty-five of some of the more important sites and presents a priority for officially recognizing those locations.

=== First Flight Park ===
The Museum worked with the City of Fort Worth to establish First Flight Park in August 2013. The park is near the site of the first powered aircraft flight in Fort Worth by Roland Garros and the Moisant International Aviators in January 1911. A Texas Historical Commission marker was placed on the site in January 2014.

=== Historic Aviation Preservation Project ===
VMAP promotes the rich aviation heritage of the North Texas region through the Historic Aviation Preservation Project, or HAPP. VMAP is actively involved with the City of Fort Worth to identify and preserve areas, items and landmarks of significance to the history of aviation in North Texas and show how aviation transformed the region from cattle and oil into one of the premier aviation centers of the world. This includes cataloging and preserving items acquired from the recently defunct Fort Worth Air and Space Museum Foundation.

=== Aviation Book Fair ===
In partnership with the Fort Worth Public Library, FWAM sponsors an annual book fair called "Women, Pilots, and Writers in Aviation." Many of the featured authors are on hand to sign books and talk about their work.

=== BroncoFest ===
FWAM holds an annual reunion for Forward Air Controllers and Pilots who flew in the OV-10 Bronco.
