= Boron Aerospace Museum =

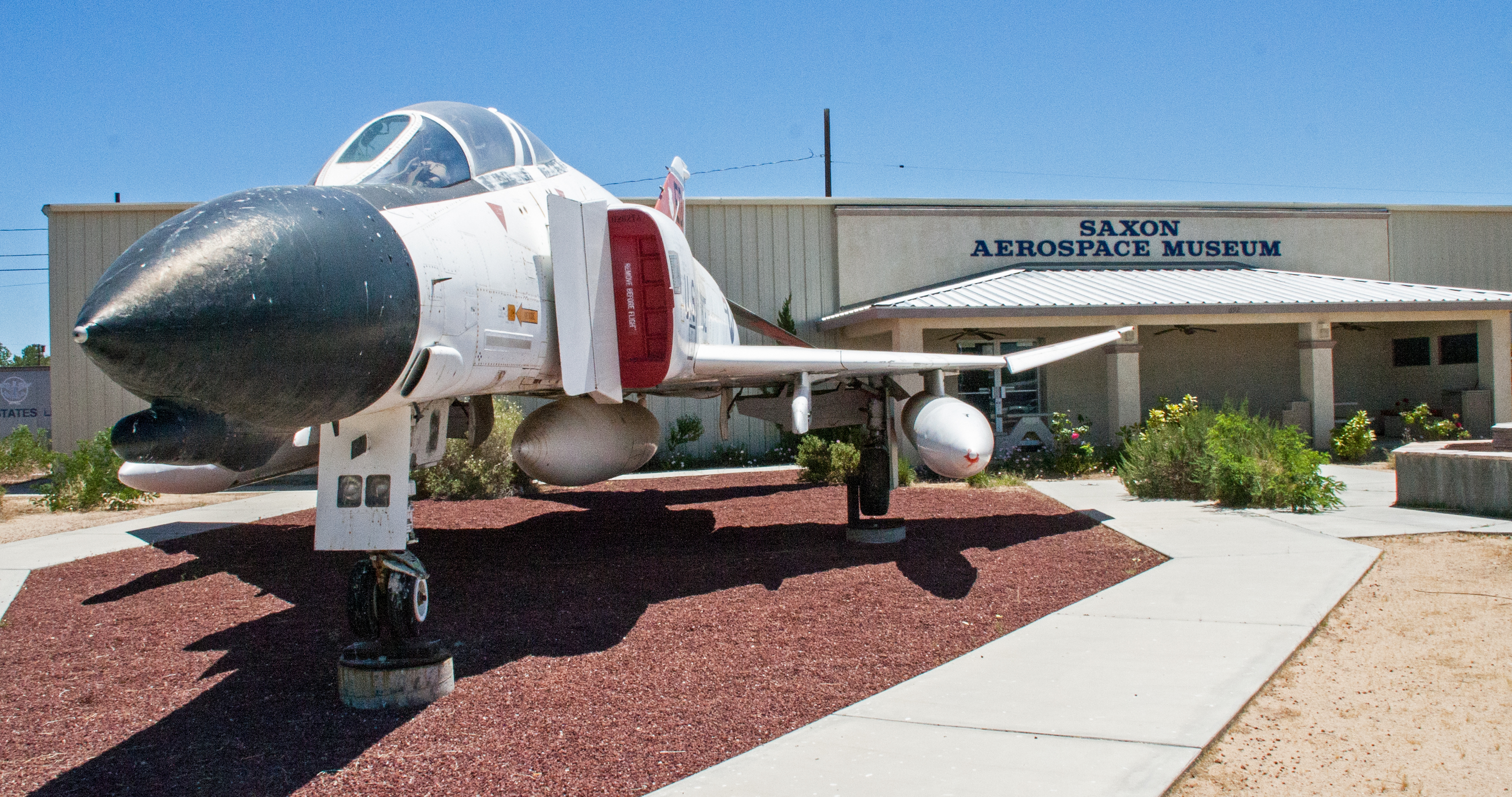
- McDonnell F-4D Phantom II in front of the museum entrance

- Location within California
- Former name: Colonel Vernon P. Saxon Jr. Aerospace Museum
- Location: Boron, California
- Coordinates: 34.9993°N 117.6513°W
- Type: Aerospace museum
- Website: www.boronaerospacemuseum.org

The Boron Aerospace Museum is an aerospace museum located in Boron, California.

== History ==
=== Background ===
The idea for the museum came from the Boron Chamber of Commerce. Planning to establish a museum began in 1996 with an effort to acquire an F-4 for display. It was also decided that the museum should be named for a local aviator and Colonel Vernon P. Saxon Jr., the Vice Commander of the nearby Air Force Flight Test Center was selected.

=== Establishment ===
A groundbreaking was held on 13 September 1997 and the Colonel Vernon P. Saxon Jr. Aerospace Museum opened on 5 September 2003

Beginning in 2010, the museum recovered a number of disused rocket engines from the area. Then, following a dispute in 2017, Colonel Saxon's collection was removed from the museum and it was renamed the Boron Aerospace Museum. Around the same time, the museum acquired three aircraft from the closed Milestones of Flight Air Museum.

== Exhibits ==
Exhibits at the museum include skis and seats from an airplane used by the Byrd Antarctic expedition, a J 35 flight simulator, a Rolls-Royce Turbomeca Adour jet engine, an XLR-8 rocket engine, an R-2800 radial engine and a P-38 instrument panel. A veterans wall is located on the interior of the west wall of the museum.

== Collection ==
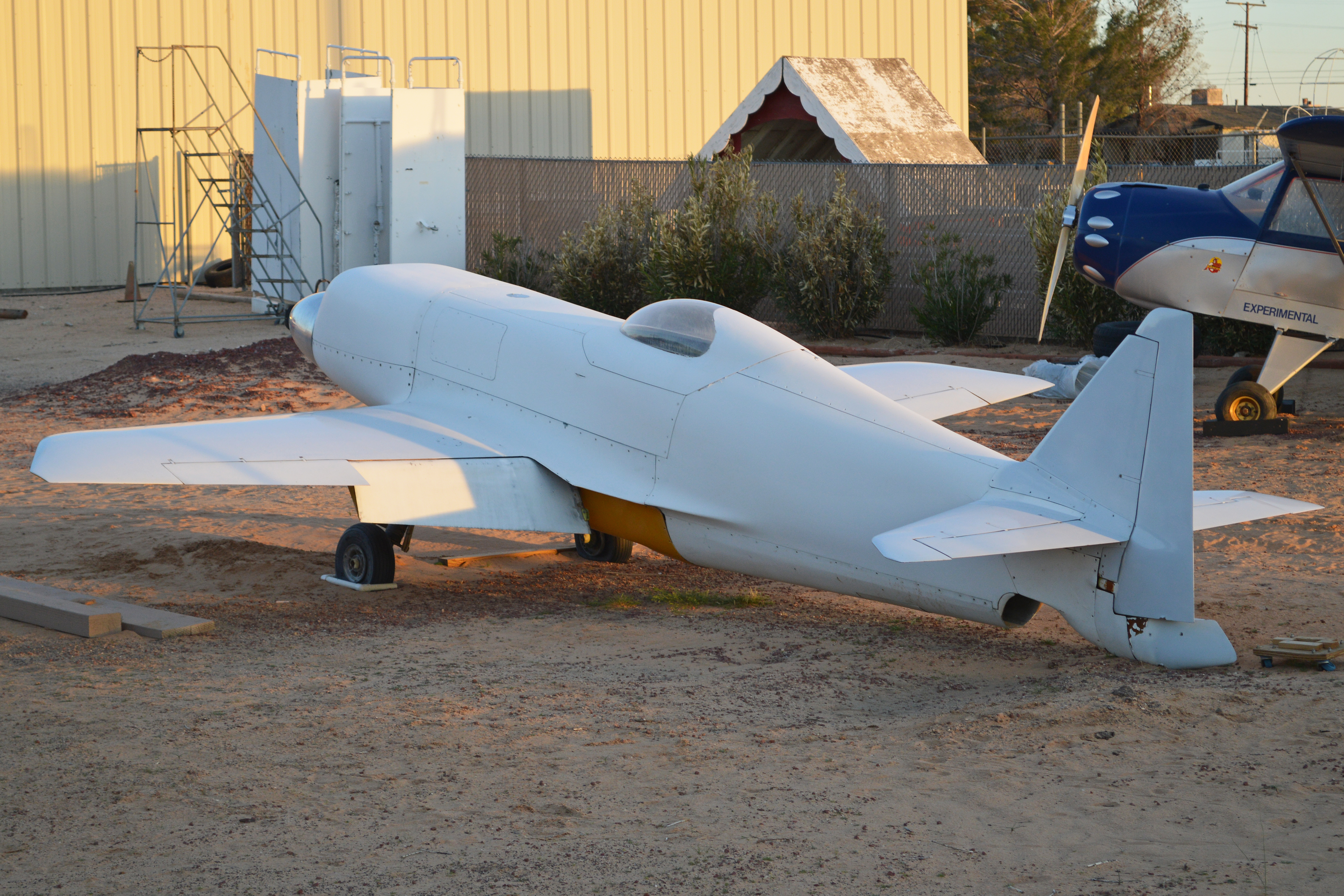
Wise RW-500

- Denny Kitfox XL
- McDonnell F-4D Phantom II
- Pietenpol Air Camper
- Saab TF-35 Draken
- Turner T-40
- Wise RW 500

== See also ==
- Air Force Flight Test Museum
- List of aviation museums
