= Istanbul Aviation Museum =

Museum in Istanbul, Turkey

Istanbul Aviation Museum (Turkish Air Force Museum)
- İstanbul Havacılık Müzesi (Hava Kuvvetleri Müzesi)
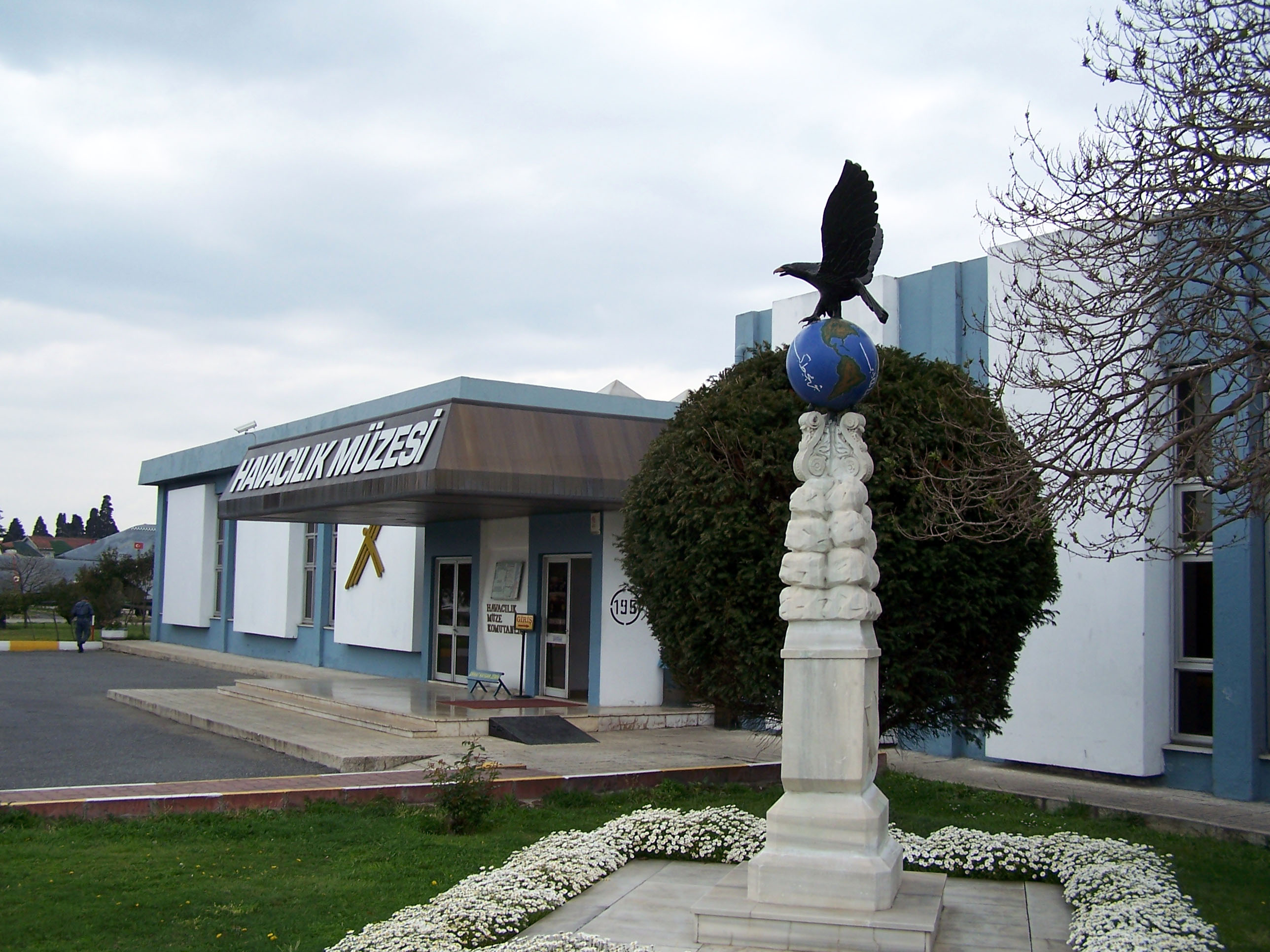
- Istanbul Aviation Museum.

- Location of Istanbul Aviation Museum in Yeşilköy
- Established: 16 October 1985 (present site)
- Coordinates: 40.963862°N 28.825765°E
- Type: Military, aviation
- Website: istanbulhavamuze.hvkk.tsk.tr

The Istanbul Aviation Museum, a.k.a. Turkish Air Force Museum, (Turkish: Havacılık Müzesi or Hava Kuvvetleri Müzesi) is a military-based museum for aviation, owned and operated by the Turkish Air Force. The museum is located in Yeşilköy neighborhood of Bakırköy district in Istanbul, Turkey. The area of the museum is 65,000 m^{2} (700,000 sq ft)

The museum not only presents various warplanes, helicopters and weapons used by the Turkish Air Force, but also civilian air transport and many samples of Turkish aeronautics history, starting from the Ottoman era.

== History ==
At the end of the First World War, the presence in the hangars of some German and other aircraft, the oldest from 1912, caused the Inspectorship of Air Force to decide to found an aviation museum. Collection of booty aircraft seized from the enemy was started. During the War of Independence these aircraft were brought to Kartal-Maltepe, to protect them from damage; however, some of the aircraft were seriously damaged in the course of transportation. This damage delayed the idea of building an aviation museum.

In 1960, upon an order by then Air Force Command Air General İrfan Tansel, the idea of building an Aviation Museum in Turkey was raised and, to that end, it was requested with an order issued in 1963 that aircraft used by the Air Forces and other units, one from each, should be reserved. As a result of the efforts exerted, an Aviation Museum Organization was established in 1966 and Turkey's first Aviation Museum was inaugurated at the Civil Airport in İzmir-Cumaovası in 1971.

=== Istanbul Aviation Museum ===
Despite attracting great attention at the inauguration, a search commenced for a new building area for the Aviation Museum, since at its existing location it did not attract sufficient visitors due to its distance from the city center and transportation difficulties. Moreover, it had been decided to repair Cumaovası runway and make more use of it for training flights and civil aviation, creating further problems for the museum in terms of housing and settlement; thus transfer of the Aviation Museum to a more appropriate place became essential.

The Aviation Museum remained in operation at İzmir-Cumaovası until 1978. Investigations resulted in a decision to relocate the museum to the area next to the Military Airport at Istanbul-Yeşilköy, near the Air Force Academy. Considerations included its location, visitor potential, improvement and maintenance conveniences, and the fact that it was also where the nation's first air unit was based and the historical importance it bears.

Construction of The new Aviation Museum was begun in 1977 and was completed in 1983. The museum occupied an area of 65,000 m2 in total, covering exhibition areas, 2,365 m^{2} (25,460 sq ft) of which is closed and 12,000 m^{2} (130,000 sq ft) open. Interior architecture and decoration were carried out by technical staff and experts from Istanbul Provincial Culture, Building and Monuments Directorate and Mimar Sinan University. The museum was opened to visitors by General Halil Sözer, Commander of the Turkish Air Force, on 16 October 1985.

== Gallery ==
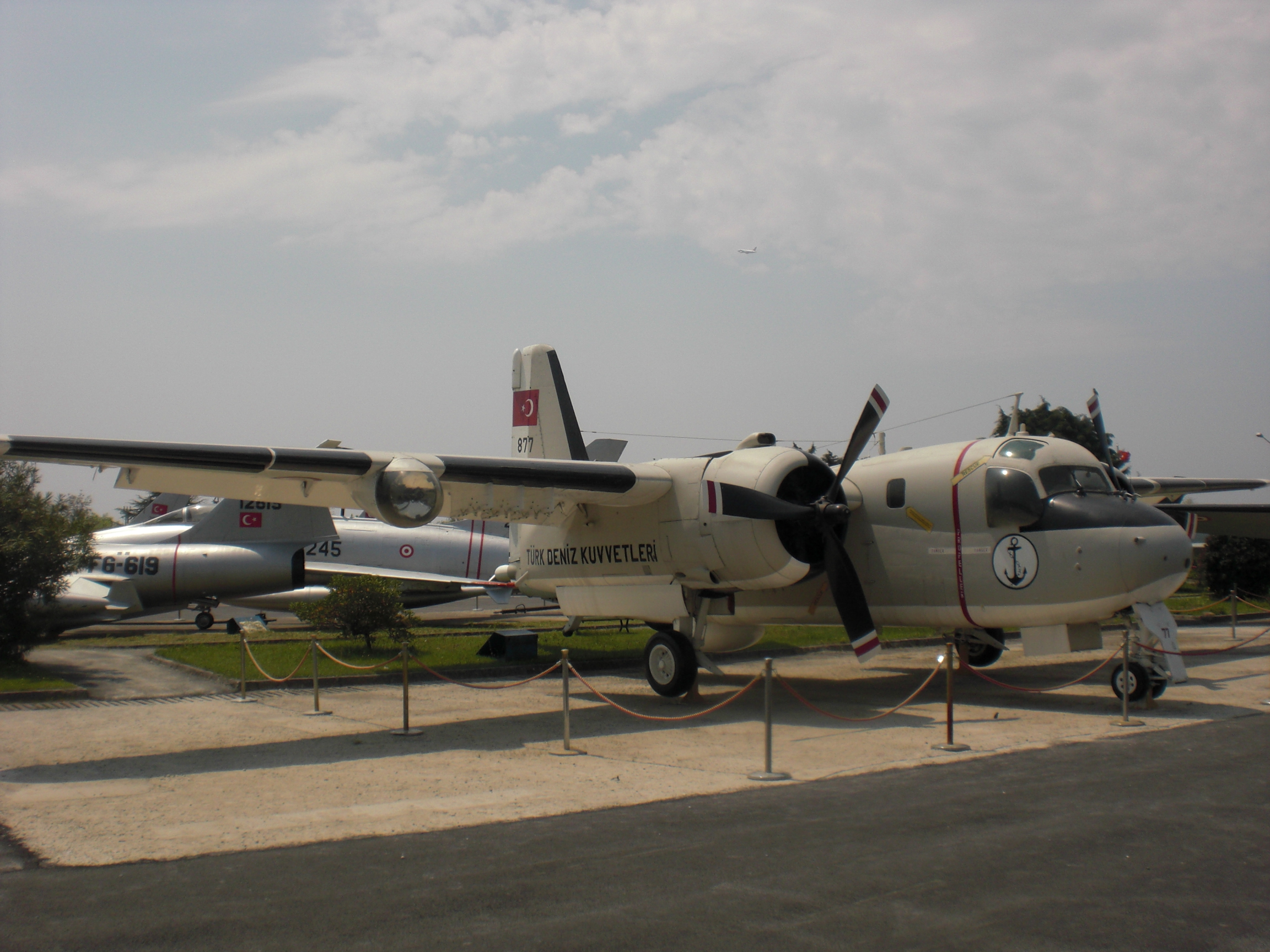
Various aircraft in the open-air museum

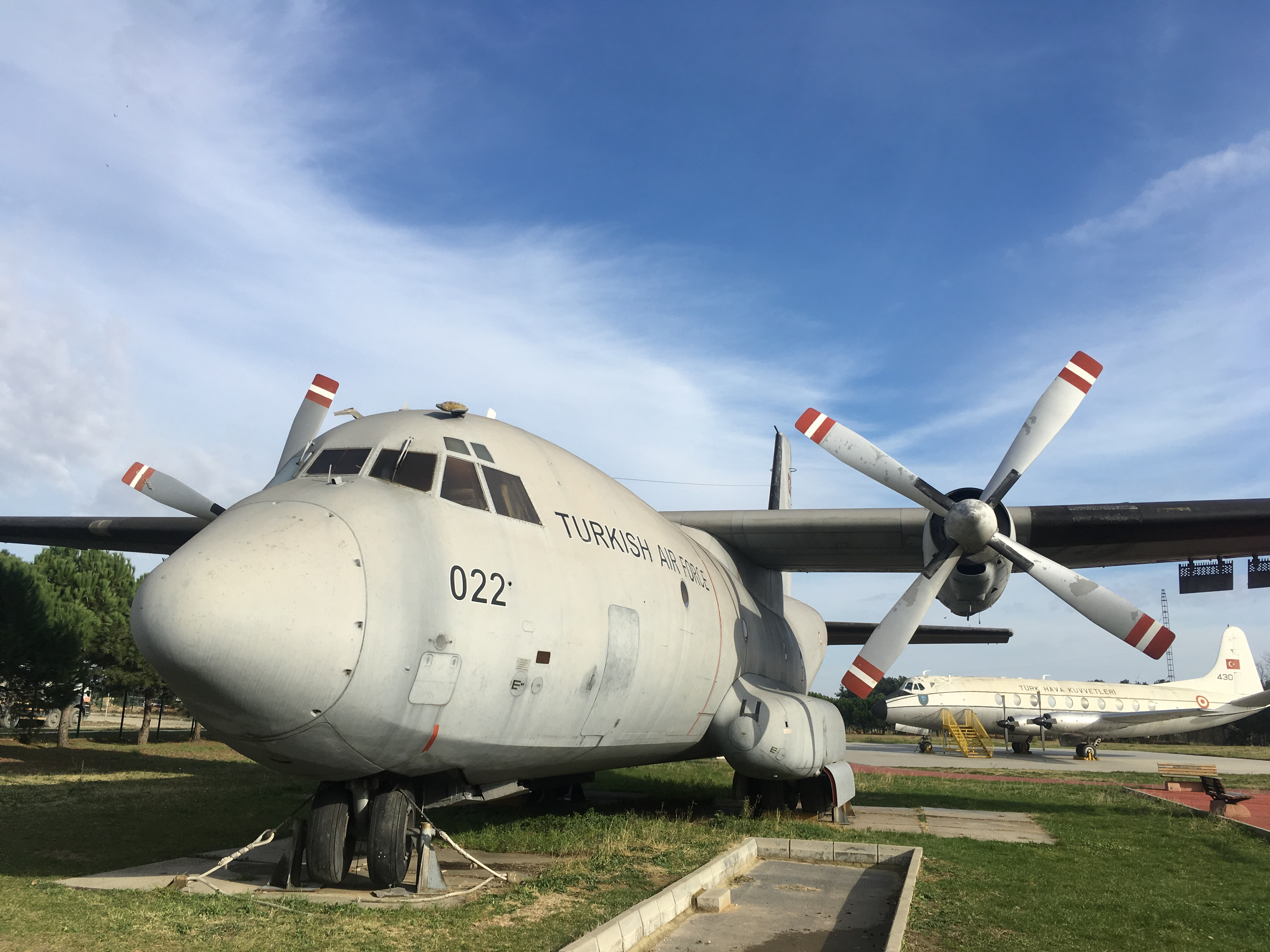
C-160 Transall

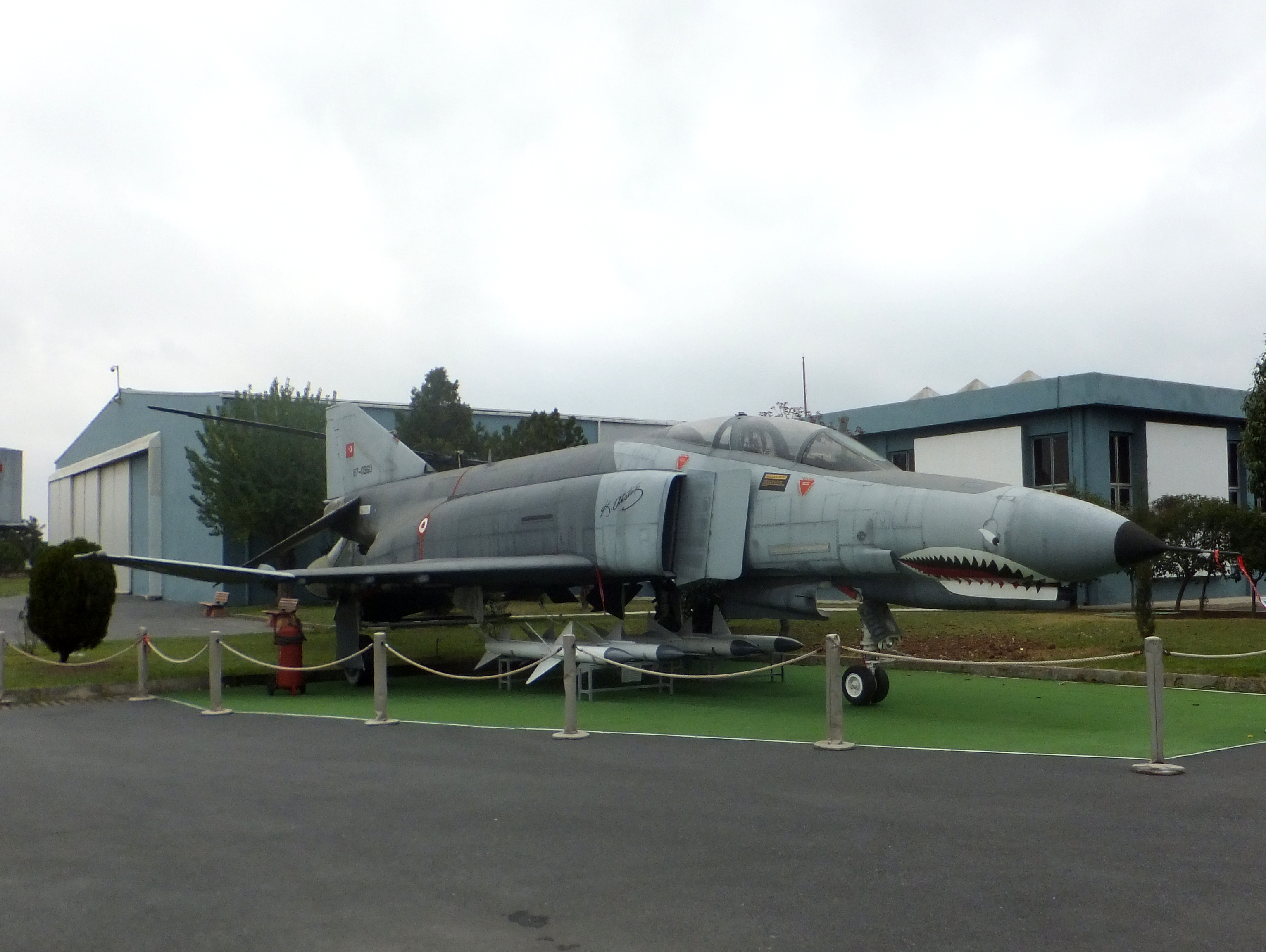
Retired Turkish Air Force F-4E Phantom II, serial number 67-0360

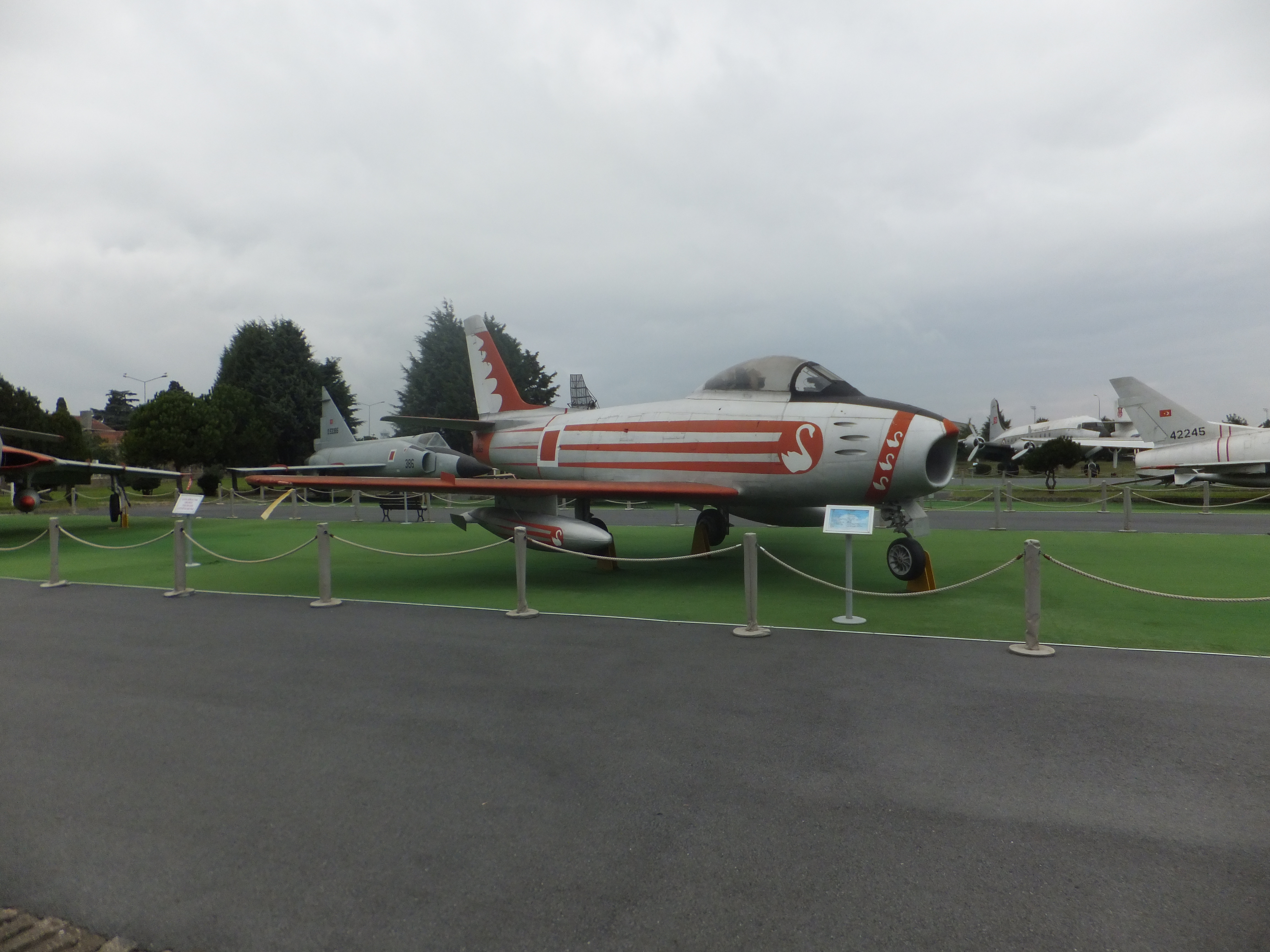
Retired Turkish Air Force F-86F Sabre

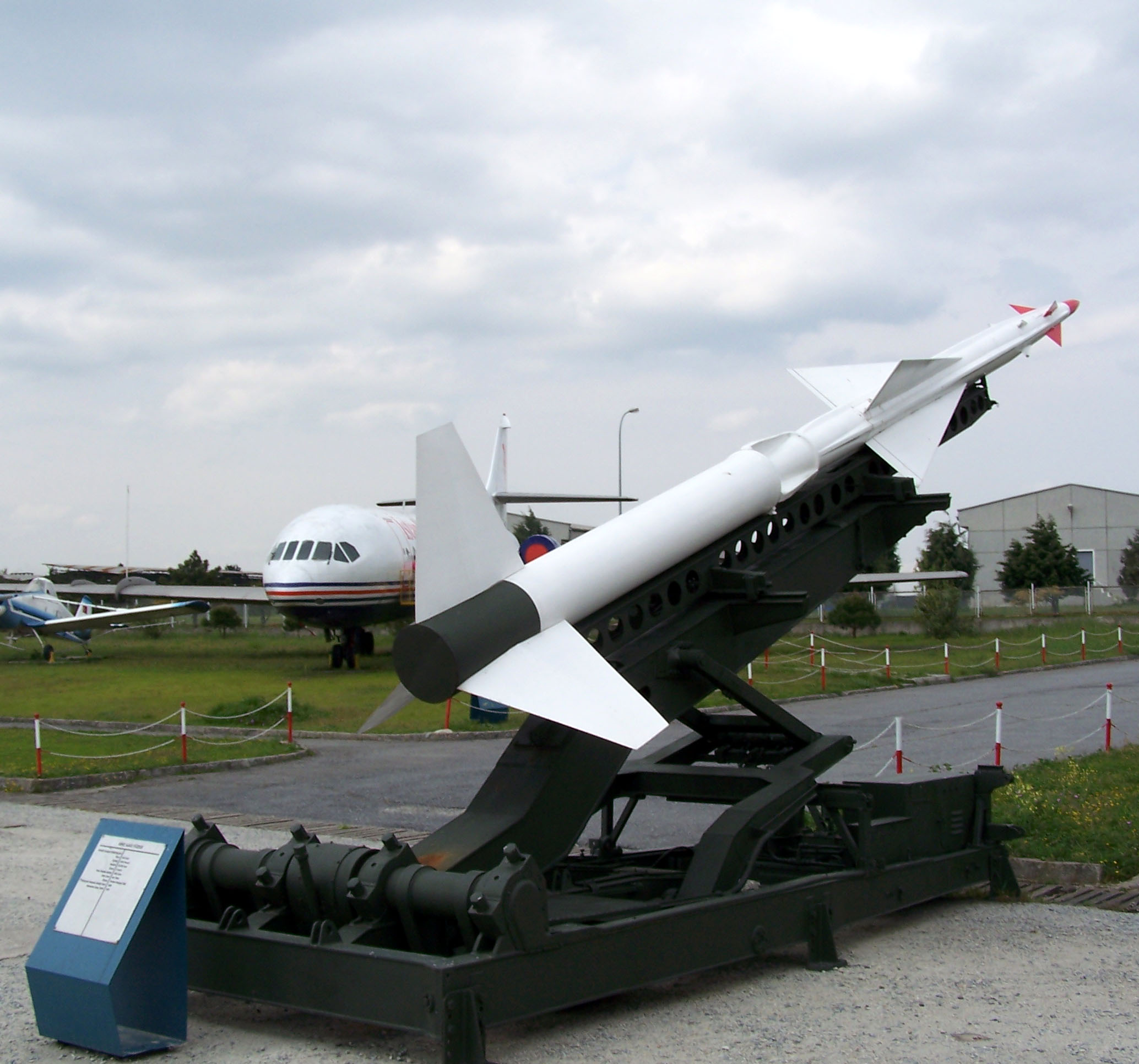
Nike Ajax missile

== See also ==
- Ankara Aviation Museum
- List of aerospace museums
