= Vecihi Hürkuş Aviation Park =

Aviation museum in Turkey

- Havacılık Müzesi
- Location of the museum in Turkey.
- Established: December 16, 1997; 28 years ago
- Location: Eskişehir, Turkey
- Coordinates: 39°47′12″N 30°30′02″E
- Type: Aviation

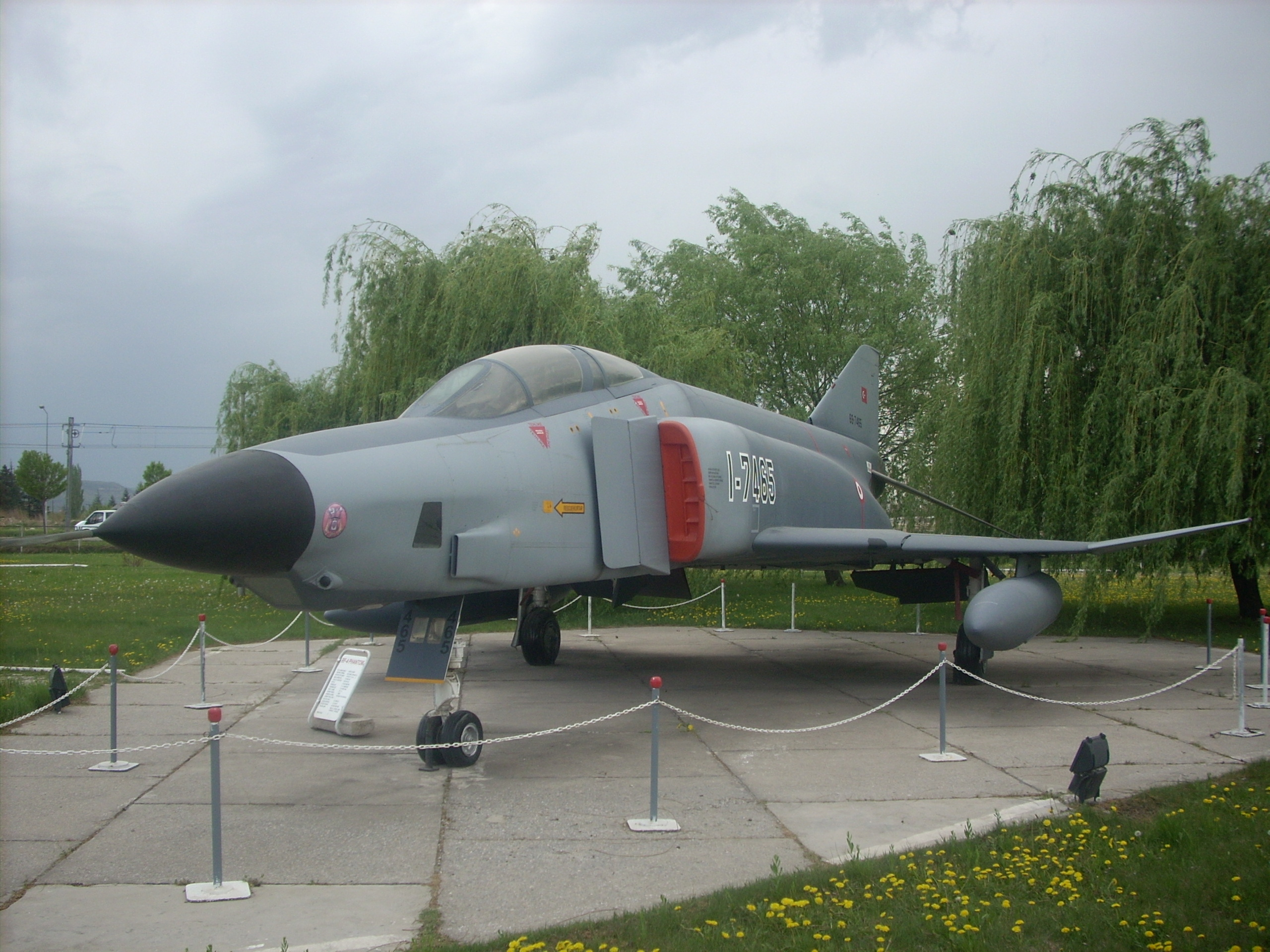
A F4 in the museum

Vecihi Hürkuş Aviation Park or former name Eskişehir Aviation Museum, also known as Eskişehir Aviation Park, (Turkish: Havacılık Müzesi or Havacılık Parkı) is an open-air museum in Eskişehir, Turkey for civil and military aviation. Established in 1997, it is operated by Anadolu University.

The museum is located on the Bursa-Ankara highway D-200/E90 across the Yunusemre Campus of Anadolu University covering an area of 39,000 m^{2} (420,000 sq ft; 39 daa). In addition to the various civilian and military aircraft exhibited in the open-air section, it features flight suits, aviator badges, aircraft mockups and aircraft engines displayed in a museum building.

The Governorship of Eskişehir Province and the Turkish Air Force 1st Tactical Air Force Command, which is stationed in Eskişehir, came together for the establishment of an aviation museum. Eleven abandoned or retired fighter, reconnaissance and cargo aircraft were donated to the museum. The interior of a C-47 cargo aircraft was arranged as a cafeteria. The open-air museum was inaugurated on December 16, 1997, and initially operated by a foundation. On May 28, 1999, the museum building was opened. After closing of the foundation, the museum was left to the Turkish Air Force on February 1, 2006. Anadolu University took over the facility from the Turkish Air Force on September 22, 2011. Following maintenance and restoration works, it was reopened in September 2012 in the status of an "Aviation Park".

The museum is open every day from 9:00 to 17:00 hours local time but Mondays and Tuesdays.

== See also ==
- List of aerospace museums
