= Ankara Aviation Museum =

Aviation museum in Ankara, Turkey

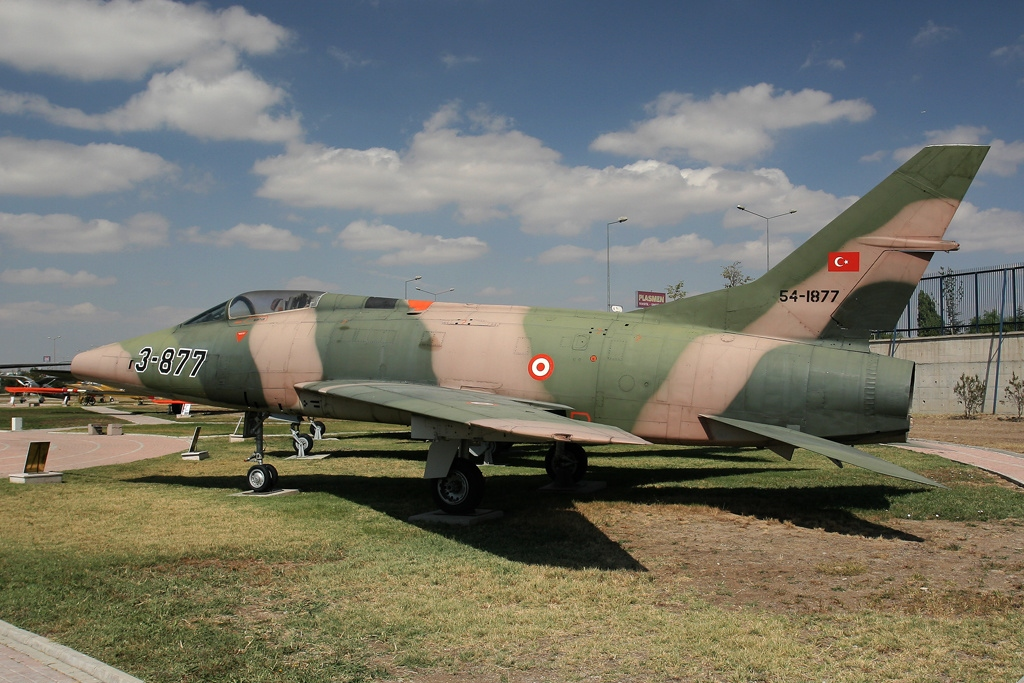
- Fighter aircraft exhibited in the garden of museum (2007)

- Location of Ankara Aviation Museum in Turkey
- Established: September 18, 1998
- Location: 11. Hava Ulaşım Üs K.lığı; Etimesgut, Ankara
- Coordinates: 39.9430°N 32.7015°E
- Type: Aviation
- Website: Museum booklet

Ankara Aviation Museum (Turkish: Ankara Hava Müzesi) is a military-based museum for aviation, owned and operated by the Turkish Air Force. The museum is located in Etimesgut district of Ankara, Turkey. The area of the museum is 64,321 m^{2} (692,350 sq ft).

== Location and access ==
The museum is located on the state road D.750, also known as Fatih Sultan Mehmet Boulevard, at 39°56′53″N 32°42′15″E. Its distance to Ankara center is about 16 km (9.9 mi).

The museum is open to the public every day but Mondays from 9:00 to 16:30 local time.

== History ==
The museum was established by the Turkish Air Force (TUAF) as the second of its kind in the country. It was opened on 18 September 1998 in presence of Sabiha Gökçen, Atatürk's adopted daughter and the first Turkish female combat pilot.

== Museum ==
The museum covers an area of 64,321 m^{2} (692,350 sq ft) including 2,000 m^{2} (22,000 sq ft) covered area. In the open space, there are airplanes and a helicopter on display. Among them are three military aircraft of MIG series, particularly a PZL-Mielec Lim-6, the Polish variant of MiG-17, donated by the Bulgarian Air Force, a Shenyang J-6, the Chinese built version of the MiG-19, from the Pakistan Air Force and a MIG-21MF gifted by the Hungarian Air Force. Another exhibit is a replica of a Blériot aircraft named Fethi Bey, which was specially manufactured in 2001 for the documentary movie Altın Kanatlar ("Golden Wings") aired by the Turkish Radio and Television Corporation (TRT).

In the covered area, mockups related to the flying tests carried out by the 17th-century Ottoman figures Lagari Hasan Çelebi and Hezarfen Ahmet Çelebi are on display. Other exhibits are mockups of diverse aircraft used by the TUAF since its establishment in 1911. In the hall of "History of Aviation in Turkey and World", there are various photos and documents, half-size mockups of the first Turkish manufactured aircraft Uğur and Pezetel, TUAF ensigns, mockups of various air force weapon systems, busts of TUAF commanders, aviator uniforms from the beginnings in the Ottoman Empire, banners, insignia as well as name lists of aviation casualties and memorial belongings of commanders. Objects belonging to Cengiz Topel, a TUAF fighter pilot shot down during the Battle of Tylliria, are on display. A corner is dedicated to Sabiha Gökçen, which contains her private belongings related to her aviation career. Another corner is reserved for Turkish female aviators.

In a building provided in 1999 by the TUAF Logistics Command and named Mavi Dünya ("The Blue World"), cockpits of Lockheed T-33 and Northrop F-5 aircraft are placed, which visitors can take a seat in.

== See also ==
- Istanbul Aviation Museum
