= Grand Haven Memorial Airpark =

Airport in Michigan, United States

- IATA: none; ICAO: none; FAA LID: 3GM

Summary
- Airport type: Public
- Owner: City of Grand Haven
- Operator: E2 Technologies, Inc
- Serves: Grand Haven, Michigan
- Location: 16446 Comstock St. Grand Haven, MI 49417
- Elevation AMSL: 604 ft (184 m)
- Coordinates: 43°02′02″N 086°11′53″W
- Website: Grand Haven Memorial Airpark

Map
- Location of airport in Michigan 3GM (the United States)

Runways
Direction	Length		Surface
Direction	ft	m	Surface
09/27	3,752	1,144	Asphalt
18/36	2,058	627	Asphalt

Grand Haven Memorial Airpark (FAA LID: 3GM) is a public airport owned and operated by the City of Grand Haven located 2 miles (3.2 km) southeast of Grand Haven, Michigan. The airport is uncontrolled, and is used for general aviation purposes. It is included in the Federal Aviation Administration (FAA) National Plan of Integrated Airport Systems for 2017–2021, in which it is categorized as a local general aviation facility.

The airport is located near the Grand Haven beach. It holds an annual Dawn Patrol/pancake breakfast to which airplanes from all over Michigan fly in.

Active associations at the airport include the Experimental Aircraft Association (EAA) Chapter 211 and the Grand Haven Aviation Association. The airport has courtesy bikes for those who fly in. Radio controlled aircraft operations are permitted on the northwest side of runway 18 only if they are a member of the Aircraft Model Association.

The majority of the operations are general aviation. There are 64 hangars on the airport grounds, including a full-service A & P maintenance shop.

Along the driveway is a static display of a USAF F-100 Super Sabre jet, painted in USAF Thunderbird colors, that was loaned to the airport in 1969. The jet was refurbished in the summer of 2016 by local Grand Haven Aviation Association Members. The Thunderbirds flew F-100 aircraft in this paint scheme beginning in 1956.

The airport is home to an RC community as well as a skydiving business.

== History ==
The airport has existed at its current location since the 1940s.

In 2014, the airport saw a $500,000 expansion to facilities, including the construction of a new 1500 square foot multipurpose room, a kitchenette, and accessible restrooms as well as expansions to the airport's parking lot. The project was completed to support the expansion of flight instruction at the airport but could be used for a wide variety of purposes.

The airport has faced a string of challenges to its funding and viability. In both 1992 and 2018, the Grand Haven Chamber of Commerce started a study into the airport's economic impact and whether it made the best use of the land. In 2019, the airport was faced with a plan to repurpose some of its land, including the north–south runway numbered 18/36, for commercial properties like factories that could bring in an estimated $600 million to the area.

== Facilities and aircraft ==
The airport has two runways. Runway 9/27 is 3752 x 75 ft (1144 x 23 m) and is asphalt. Runway 18/36 is 2058 x 60 ft (627 x 18 m) and is also asphalt.

The airport has a fixed-base operator that sells fuel, performs general maintenance, and offers amenities.

For the 12-month period ending December 31, 2021, the airport had 11,315 aircraft operations, an average of 31 per day. This includes nearly 100% general aviation, <1% air taxi, and <1% military. For the same time period, there are 63 aircraft based on the field: 59 single-engine and 3 multi-engine airplanes as well as 1 helicopter.

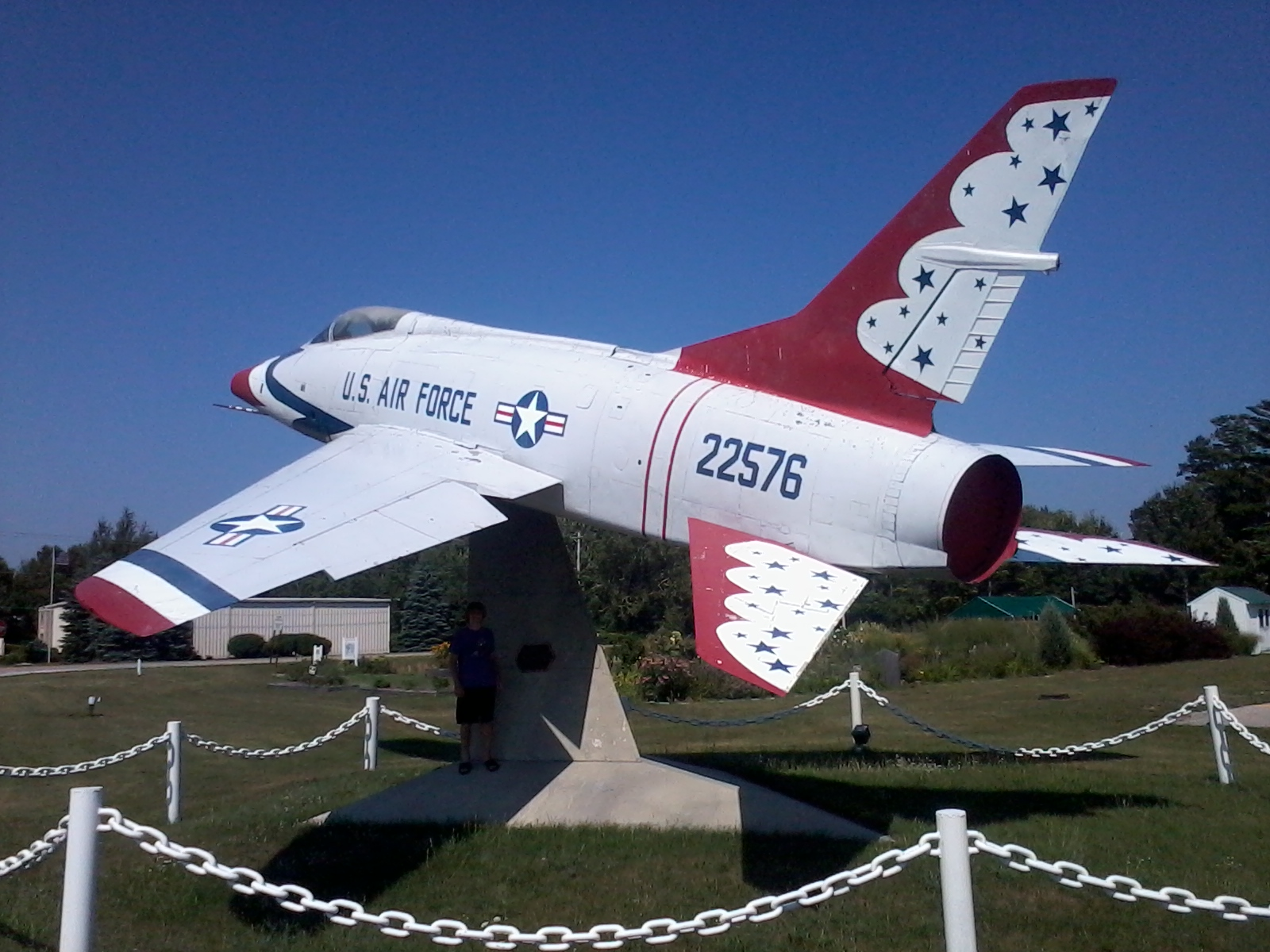
F-100 Super Sabre on static display at Grand Haven Memorial Airpark (2011)

== Accidents and incidents ==
- On July 20, 1995, an experimental Darrell Falconar F9 crashed after takeoff from Grand Haven Memorial Airpark. The aircraft appeared to stall about 1500 feet from the end of the runway after departure, and the wings appeared to "flutter back and forth" before the right wing dropped and the airplane fell below the treeline. It was also reported the aircraft appeared to have trouble powering up before departure. The probable cause was found to be a failure of the pilot to maintain adequate airspeed during the climb after takeoff, which resulted in an inadvertent stall.
- On June 30, 2013, an amateur-built Youngster aircraft impacted terrain after departure from Grand Haven Memorial. The pilot was performing the initial test flight of the aircraft and had previously performed fast taxi tests, in which no anomalies were found. The pilot then planned to fly the plane in the airport's traffic pattern. After liftoff, the plane felt slow, and while the pilot adjusted the controls to achieve the best-rate-of-climb speed, the airspeed dropped with only slight changes in pitch. The pilot attempted to turn but leveled off when he realized he didn't have enough speed to complete one. The engine began losing power until the pilot could no longer maintain altitude, at which point the pilot attempted to aim for a landing area. But the aircraft struck trees and subsequently the ground. The probable cause was found to be a loss of engine power due to carburetor icing.
- On July 6, 2019, a skydiver made an emergency landing at Grand Haven after his parachute failed mid-jump. The jumper managed to cut his primary parachute away and activate his reserve chute in time to land safely.
- On August 17, 2019, a skydiver died in an accident at Grand Haven Memorial Airport. Witnesses say the skydiver's parachute may have come into contact with another skydiver, at which point the parachute collapsed.
- On March 2, 2021, a Cessna 210 crashed after takeoff from Grand Haven Memorial. The aircraft tried to land in a nearby field but lost too much airspeed and crashed into woods short of the intended landing spot.

== See also ==
- List of airports in Michigan
