= AN/ARC-34 =

The AN/ARC-34 is a UHF aircraft radio transceiver that was used in many U.S. aircraft of the 1950s and 1960s, such as the A-37, B-52, B-57, F-5, F-86, F-100, F-101, F-102, C-130, C-135, C-137, C-140, CH-3, H-43, H-53, T-38, T-39 and U-2.

== System Description ==
The ARC-34 was a military UHF AM radio that operated between 225.0-399.9 MHz and transmitted at 8 watts. It featured a separate guard receiver for monitoring 243 MHz, while simultaneously monitoring the active channel selected. The unit was unpressurized, but a pressurized version, designated AN/ARC-133, could operate at altitudes up to 50,000 feet. The radio system was designed by RCA, but Magnavox built some models.

In accordance with the Joint Electronics Type Designation System (JETDS), the "AN/ARC-34" designation represents the 34th design of an Army-Navy airborne electronic device for radio communications equipment. The JETDS system also now is used to name all Department of Defense electronic systems.

== See also ==
- List of military electronics of the United States
