= North American F-100 Super Sabre =

1953 fighter aircraft family

F-100 Super Sabre
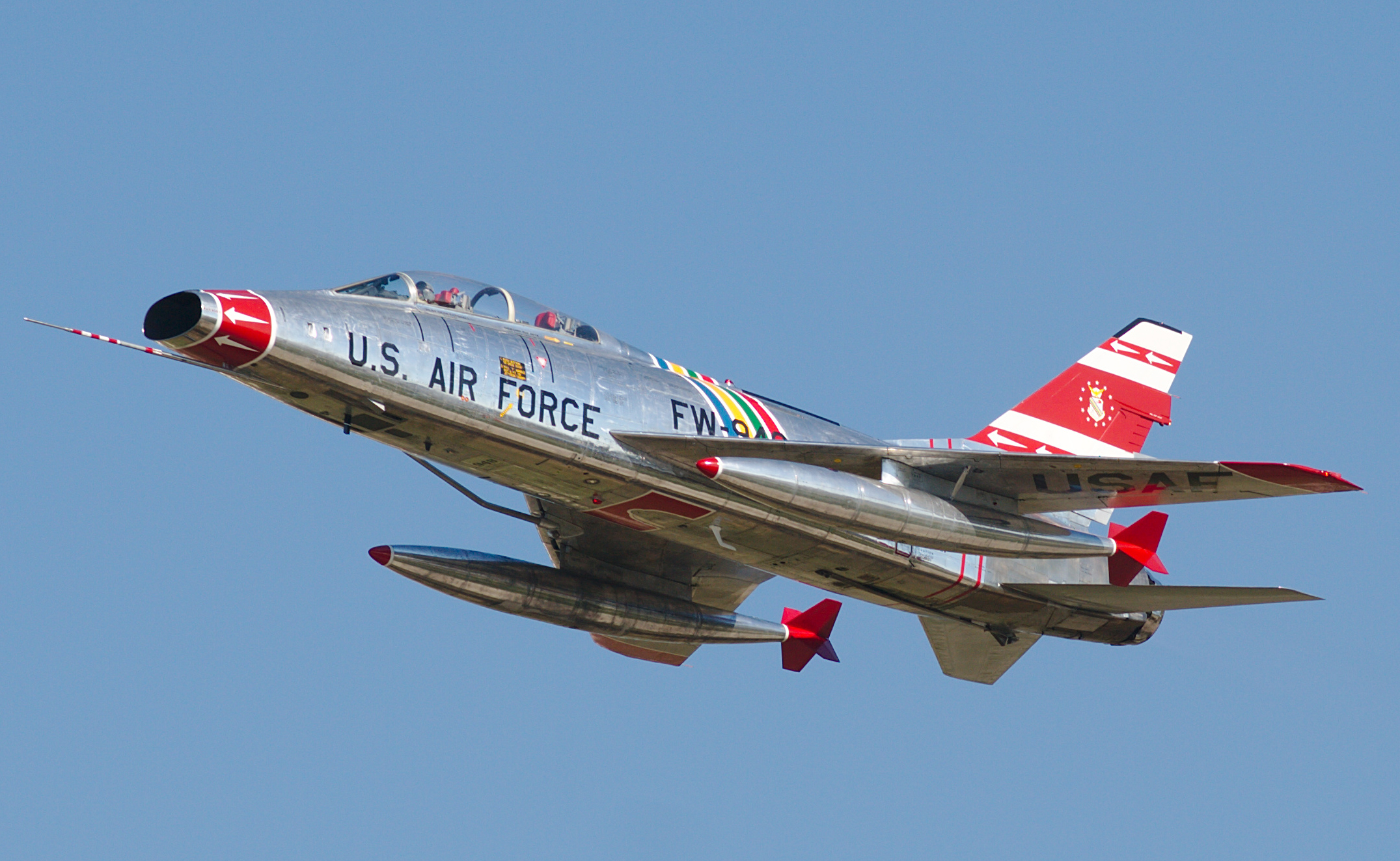
- An F-100 warbird over Airventure 2015

General information
- Type: Fighter; Fighter-bomber
- Manufacturer: North American Aviation
- Status: Retired
- Primary users: United States Air Force Turkish Air Force; Republic of China Air Force; French Air Force
- Number built: 2,294

History
- Manufactured: 1953–1959
- Introduction date: 27 September 1954
- First flight: 25 May 1953
- Retired: 1979, United States Air National Guard; 1988, Republic of China Air Force
- Developed from: North American F-86 Sabre
- Developed into: North American F-107

The North American F-100 Super Sabre is an American supersonic jet fighter aircraft designed and produced by the aircraft manufacturer North American Aviation. The first of the Century Series of American jet fighters, it was the first United States Air Force (USAF) fighter capable of supersonic speed in level flight.

The F-100 was envisioned during the late 1940s as a higher-performance successor to the F-86 Sabre air-superiority fighter. Initially referred to as the Sabre 45, it was delivered as an unsolicited proposal to the USAF in January 1951, leading to two prototypes being ordered one year later following modifications. The first, YF-100A, performed its maiden flight on 25 May 1953, seven months ahead of schedule. Flight testing demonstrated both the F-100's promising performance and several deficiencies, which included its tendency of yaw instability and inertia coupling that led to numerous fatal accidents. On 27 September 1954, the F-100A officially entered USAF service, but as a result of six major accidents by 10 November 1954, the type was grounded while investigations and remedial work were conducted. The F-100 returned to flight in February 1955.

In response to the Tactical Air Command's (TAC) request for a fighter-bomber, the F-100C was developed, followed by the more capable F-100D. Several other models were developed, including the two-seat F-100F supersonic trainer. As early as 1958, the USAF began to withdraw its F-100As, but returned them to service during early 1962 amid escalating world tensions. Many F-100s saw combat use during the Vietnam War before being superseded by the high-speed Republic F-105 Thunderchief in the strike mission role. The F-100 flew extensively over South Vietnam as the USAF's primary close air support aircraft until being replaced by the more capable subsonic LTV A-7 Corsair II, General Dynamics F-111 Aardvark, and the McDonnell Douglas F-4 Phantom II. Some 242 F-100s of various models were lost over Vietnam; several F-100As were rebuilt into RF-100A aerial reconnaissance aircraft. Several F-100Fs were modified into electronic warfare platforms. Several proposed models and derivatives, such as the F-100B interceptor and the F-107, did not proceed through to production.

Amid a relatively high attrition rate and the arrival of more advanced fighters, the USAF opted to permanently withdraw its remaining F-100s during the early 1970s. The type was also operated by the Air National Guard until 1979. The F‑100 was exported to several overseas operators, including NATO air forces and the Republic of China Air Force. The F-100 was deployed during the Turkish invasion of Cyprus, performing close air-support missions. French F-100s also saw action during the Algerian War. During its later life, the F-100 was often referred to as the "Hun", a shortened version of "one hundred".

== Development ==
=== Background ===
The F-100 can be traced back to an internal design study performed by North American Aviation as early as 1949. It was named Sabre 45 in reference to its 45° wing sweep and essentially represented an evolution of the company's successful F-86 Sabre. In January 1951, the company delivered an unsolicited proposal for a supersonic day fighter to the USAF. On 7 July 1951, a mockup of the aircraft was presented for inspection; the USAF produced a general operational requirement that called for an air-superiority weapon to be operational no later than 1957, preferably by 1955. During October 1951, the Air Force Council advocated for the development of a refined model of the Sabre 45; furthermore, it agreed with the Aircraft and Weapons Board's recommendation that it be purchased in quantity even prior to flight testing despite the risks involved in this approach.

By mid-November 1951, in excess of 100 aircraft configuration change requests had been received, necessitating numerous modifications to the original design; several of these alterations were focused on its armaments and were intended to improve its lethality. The new aircraft was accepted as the F-100 on 30 November 1951. On 3 January 1952, the USAF placed an order for two prototypes; one month later, a follow-on production order was issued for 23 F-100As, while an additional 250 F-100As were ordered in August of that year, as well. Around this time, development work slowed considerably while North American focused on improving and ramping up production of the F-86 in response to urgent demands for more aircraft to participate in the Korean War.

=== Into flight ===
On 25 May 1953, North American Aviation Chief Test Pilot George Welch conducted the first flight of the YF-100A, seven months ahead of schedule. Once level at 35,000 feet, he accelerated to supersonic speed, leaving his chase pilot, "Pete" Everest well behind in his F-86D. As such, he was the first person to exceed Mach 1 in level flight in a jet. During one of its early test flights, the first prototype reached a maximum of Mach 1.05 in spite of being fitted with a derated Pratt & Whitney XJ57-P-7 engine. By September, flight testing had confirmed the presence of three major deficiencies in the design, all of which required correction ahead of it being considered as acceptable. On 14 October 1953, the second prototype flew for the first time, followed by the first production F-100A on 29 October 1953. This first F-100A was put through extensive testing to help develop fixes for identified deficiencies. Progress on the project was set back by a three-month general strike by North American employees in late 1953.

An operational evaluation of the F-100A was conducted by the USAF in November 1953; it determined that the new aircraft possessed superior performance to existing USAF fighters, but declared that it was not ready for widescale deployment due to various deficiencies and functional difficulties in the design. These findings were subsequently confirmed during operational suitability tests performed under Project Hot Rod. During August 1954, six F-100s arrived at the Air Proving Ground Command (APGC), Eglin Air Force Base. The Air Force Operational Test Center (AFOTC) used four of the fighters for operational suitability tests, while the other two aircraft underwent armament tests by the Air Force Armament Center. The Tactical Air Division of the AFOTC conducted the APGC testing under the direction of project office Lieutenant Colonel Henry W. Brown; initial testing was completed by APGC personnel at Edwards Air Force Base.

Despite these shortcomings, the Tactical Air Command (TAC) advocated for the F-100 as a matter of urgency, particularly in light of delays experienced in the Republic F-84F Thunderstreak program; furthermore, TAC recommended the production of a day fighter with a secondary fighter-bomber capability that would be suitable not only for the USAF, but also foreign nations covered by the Mutual Development Assistance Program. Accordingly, during December 1953, the Air Council opted to alter the program, reducing the outstanding total orders for the F-100A by 70 aircraft in favor of a new fighter-bomber variant that would be capable of delivering nuclear bombs. In February 1954, the USAF issued the first production contract for this fighter-bomber model, the F-100C; equipped to carry additional munitions and fuel tanks, the prototype performed its maiden flight one month later, while the first production aircraft followed in January 1955.

In response to observed improvements in fighters deployed by the Soviet Union, the USAF directed production of the F-100 to be accelerated via the establishment of a second production line in Columbus in September 1954. During November 1954, production of the F-100 was reduced to 24 aircraft per month in response to a spate of fatal accidents. Aircraft already built were stored and the corrections were applied later. Following appropriate remedial work, the USAF opted to partially lift its restrictions on both production and flights of the F-100 in February 1955; deliveries resumed two months later.

=== Further development ===
Air Strike Force (1956) USAF promotional film

Various adaptions and derivatives of the F-100 were considered during its development. During mid-1954, an interceptor model of the aircraft was being studied; in July of that year, a mockup of the envisioned F-110B1 was completed; it was intended as a backup for the in-development Convair F-102 Delta Dagger interceptor. However, the difficulties experienced with the F-100A were viewed as evidence that the aircraft, even in the face of expected improvements, would be incapable of satisfying the operational requirement to a greater degree than that of the F-102.

The definitive model would be the F-100D. During May 1954, the TAC had requested a more sophisticated fighter-bomber; the company aimed to address the offensive shortcomings of the F-100C by being primarily a ground-attack aircraft with secondary fighter capabilities. To achieve this, the aircraft was fitted with autopilot and upgraded avionics and starting with the 184th production aircraft, compatibility with the AIM-9 Sidewinder air-to-air missile. To further address the dangerous flight characteristics, the wingspan was extended by 26 in (66 cm) and the vertical tail area was increased by 27%. In October 1954, an initial production contract was issued for the F-100D, and follow-on contracts were issued in March and December of the following year. On 24 January 1956, the first F-100D (54–2121) flew, piloted by Daniel Darnell.

In December 1954, a new General Operational Requirement, GOR 68, was issued by the USAF; it called for a tactical fighter-bomber that would also be effective as an aerial-superiority fighter under both day and night conditions. North American opted to respond with a heavily modified version of the F-100; the design was so substantially different that it was promptly decided to redesignate it as the F-107. Intended for speeds as high as Mach 2, the aircraft could be easily distinguished from the F-100 by the placement of the air intake above and behind the cockpit. It was not ultimately produced in quantity, having been passed over in favor of the competing Republic F-105 Thunderchief.

On 8 September 1955, North American proposed modifying an F-100C into a two-seat trainer model at no expense to the USAF; two months later, the air council decided to produce the type, perceiving a need for a supersonic trainer. During December 1955, an initial production contract for the F-100F trainer was placed. The prototype TF-100C, which lacked most operational equipment, made its first flight on 6 August 1956; it was followed by the first production aircraft on 7 March 1957.

== Design ==
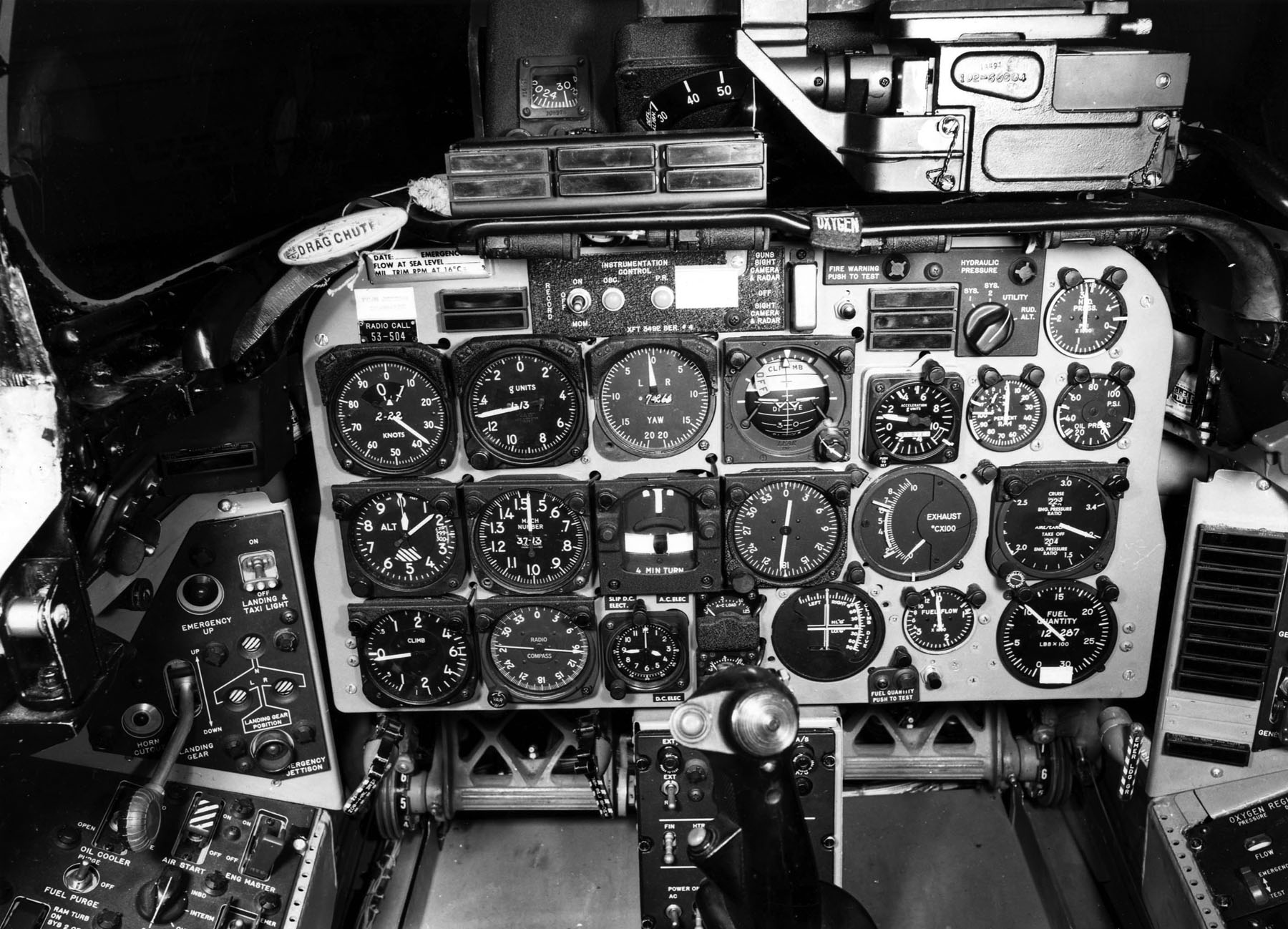
The cockpit of an F-100D

The North American F-100 Super Sabre is a supersonic fighter aircraft. It was one of the first aircraft with a stabilator, or all-moving tailplane. Unlike modern stabilators which use an anti-servo tab, gearing and a variable stiffness spring were attached to the control stick to provide acceptable resistance to prevent pilot-induced oscillation. Unusually, the aircraft made extensive use of titanium throughout key areas of the airframe.

The F-100 exhibited several concerning handling difficulties, especially early on in its flying career. Particularly troubling was the yaw instability in certain flight conditions, which produced inertia coupling. The aircraft could develop a sudden yaw and roll, occurring too rapidly for the pilot to correct and quickly overstressed the aircraft's structure, leading to disintegration. Under these conditions, North American's chief test pilot, George Welch, was killed while dive testing an early-production F-100A (s/n 52-5764) on 12 October 1954. Several early modifications were made to address the problem, including the integration of black boxes with the yaw and pitch axis, the reshaping of the vertical tail surfaces, shortening of the tailfin, and increased chord of the rudder. Another control problem suffered by the type stemmed from the handling characteristics of the swept wing at high angles of attack; as the aircraft approached stall speeds, loss of lift on the tips of the wings caused a violent pitch-up. This particular phenomenon (which could easily be fatal at low altitude with insufficient time to recover) became known as the "Sabre dance".

The F-100 was the subject of many modification programs over the course of its service. Many of these were improvements to electronics, structural strengthening, and projects to improve ease of maintenance. One of these was the replacement of the original afterburners of the J-57 engines with the more advanced afterburners from retired Convair F-102 Delta Dagger interceptors. This modification changed the appearance of the aft end of the F-100, doing away with the original "petal-style" exhaust. The afterburner modification started in the 1970s and solved maintenance problems with the old type, as well as operational problems, including compressor stall problems.

== Operational history ==
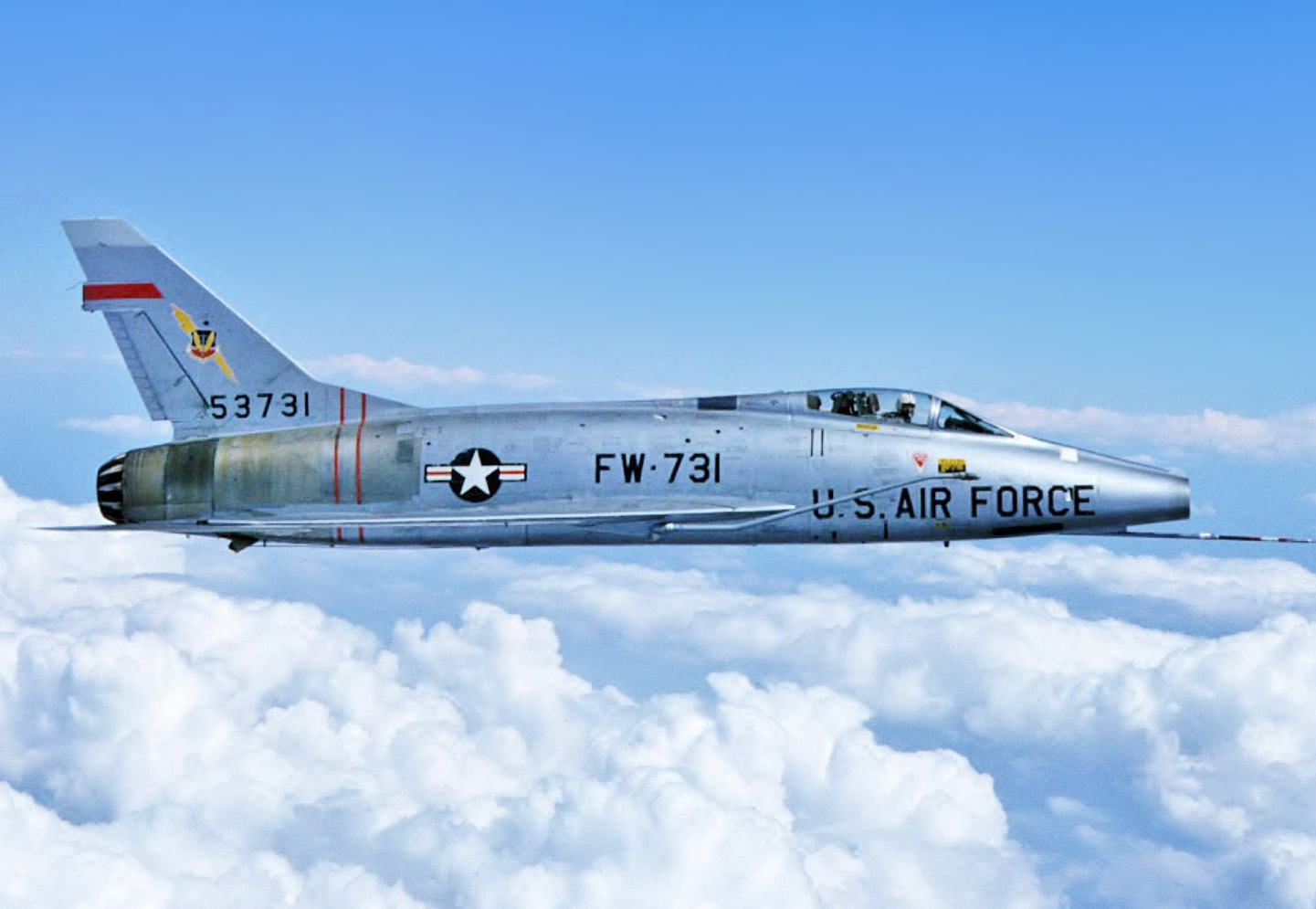
An F-100C Super Sabre over Rogers Dry Lake

On 27 September 1954, the F-100A officially entered USAF service with the 479th Fighter Wing, based at George AFB, California. By 10 November 1954, the F-100As had suffered six major accidents (Note: Including the death of British Air Commodore Geoffrey D. Stephenson while on an exchange tour) due to a combination of factors, including flight instability, structural failures, and hydraulic failures, prompting the USAF to ground the entire fleet. During February 1955, the F-100A resumed flight while the 479th was finally declared operational in September 1955. Due to ongoing problems with the type, the USAF opted to start phasing out the F-100A during 1958. Many of these aircraft were reallocated to Air National Guard (ANG) units while others were given to the Chinese Nationalist Air Force.

During 1961, the withdrawal of all USAF F-100As had been completed; by that time, 47 aircraft had been lost in major accidents. However, as a result of escalating world tensions in response to the Berlin Wall's construction in August 1961, the USAF was compelled to recall the F-100As into active service. During early 1962, it was decided to extend the type's service life. However, the F-100A was largely used for aircrew training during this time. Due to attrition, the ANG ceased operating the F-100A during 1967 while the USAF opted to permanently retire the model in early 1970.

The F-100C fighter-bomber entered service on 14 July 1955 with the 450th Fighter Wing at Foster AFB, Texas. Operational testing in 1955 revealed that the F-100C was at best an interim solution, sharing all the flaws of the F-100A. The uprated J57-P-21 engine boosted performance, although it continued to suffer from compressor stalls, but the F-100C was considered an excellent platform for nuclear toss bombing because of its high top speed. The inertia coupling problem was reasonably addressed with the installation of a yaw damper in the 146th F-100C, which was later retrofitted to earlier aircraft. A pitch damper was added, starting with the 301st F-100C, at a cost of US$10,000 per aircraft.

The addition of "wet" hardpoints meant the F-100C could carry a pair of 275 US gal (1,040 L) and a pair of 200 US gal (770 L) drop tanks. However, the combination caused a loss of directional stability at high speeds, so the four tanks were soon replaced by a pair of 450 US gal (1,730 L) drop tanks. The 450s proved scarce and expensive and were often replaced by smaller 335 US gal (1,290 L) tanks. Most troubling to TAC was the fact that, as of 1965, only 125 F-100Cs were capable of using all non-nuclear weapons in the USAF inventory, particularly cluster bombs and AIM-9 Sidewinder air-to-air missiles. By the time the F-100C was phased out in June 1970, 85 had been lost in major accidents.

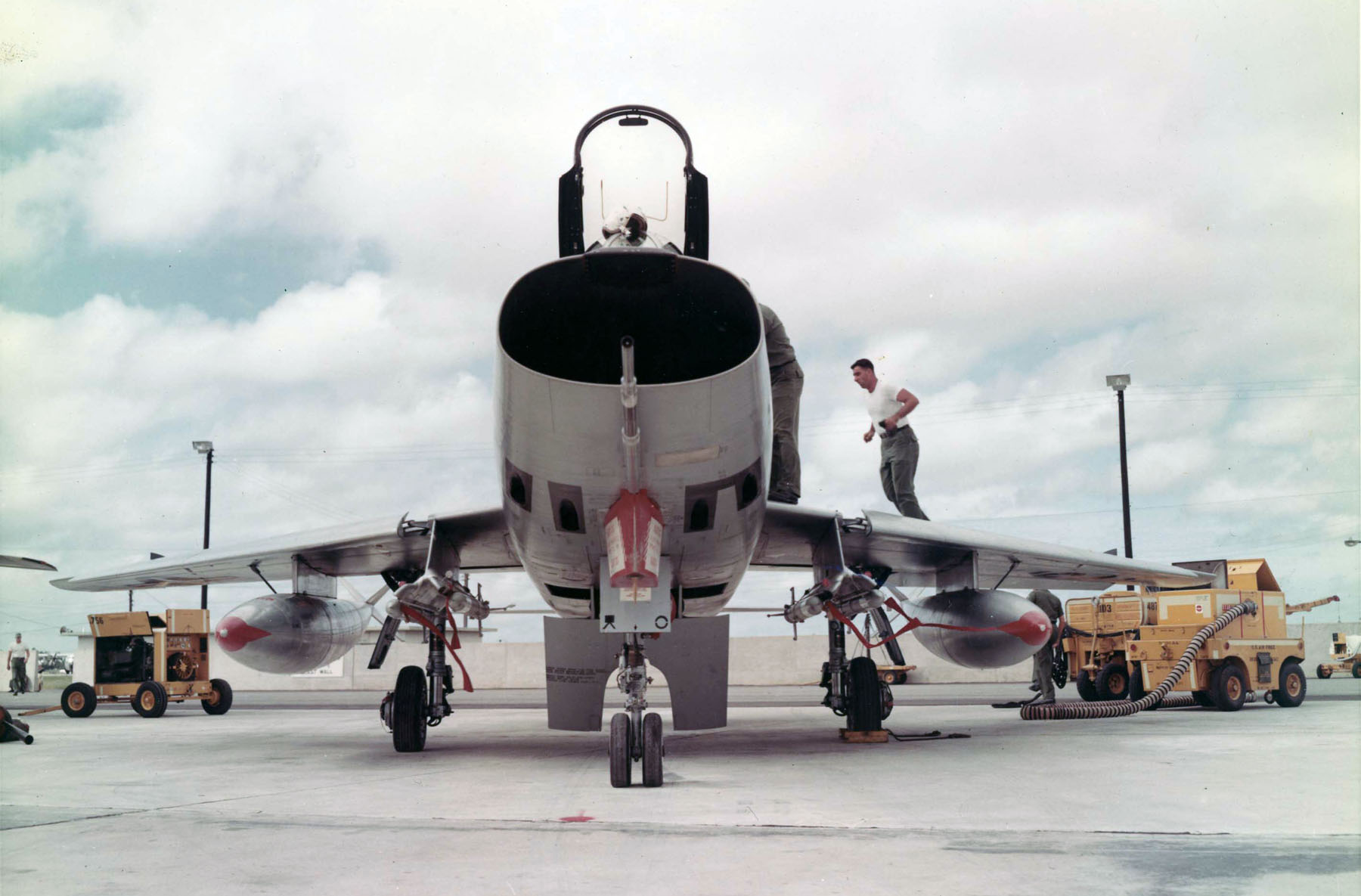
An F-100D showing its elliptical air intake

The F-100D entered service on 29 September 1956 with the 405th Fighter Wing at Langley AFB. The model exhibited reliability problems from the onset, particularly with the constant-speed inverter which provided constant-frequency current to the electrical systems. This unit was so unreliable that the USAF required it to have its own oil system to minimize damage in case of failure. Landing gear and brake parachute malfunctions claimed several aircraft while the refueling probes had a tendency to break away during high-speed maneuvers. During 1959, 65 aircraft were modified to also fire the AGM-12 Bullpup air-to-ground missile. Numerous post-production fixes created such a diversity of capabilities between individual aircraft that by 1965, around 700 F-100Ds underwent High Wire modifications to standardize the weapon systems.

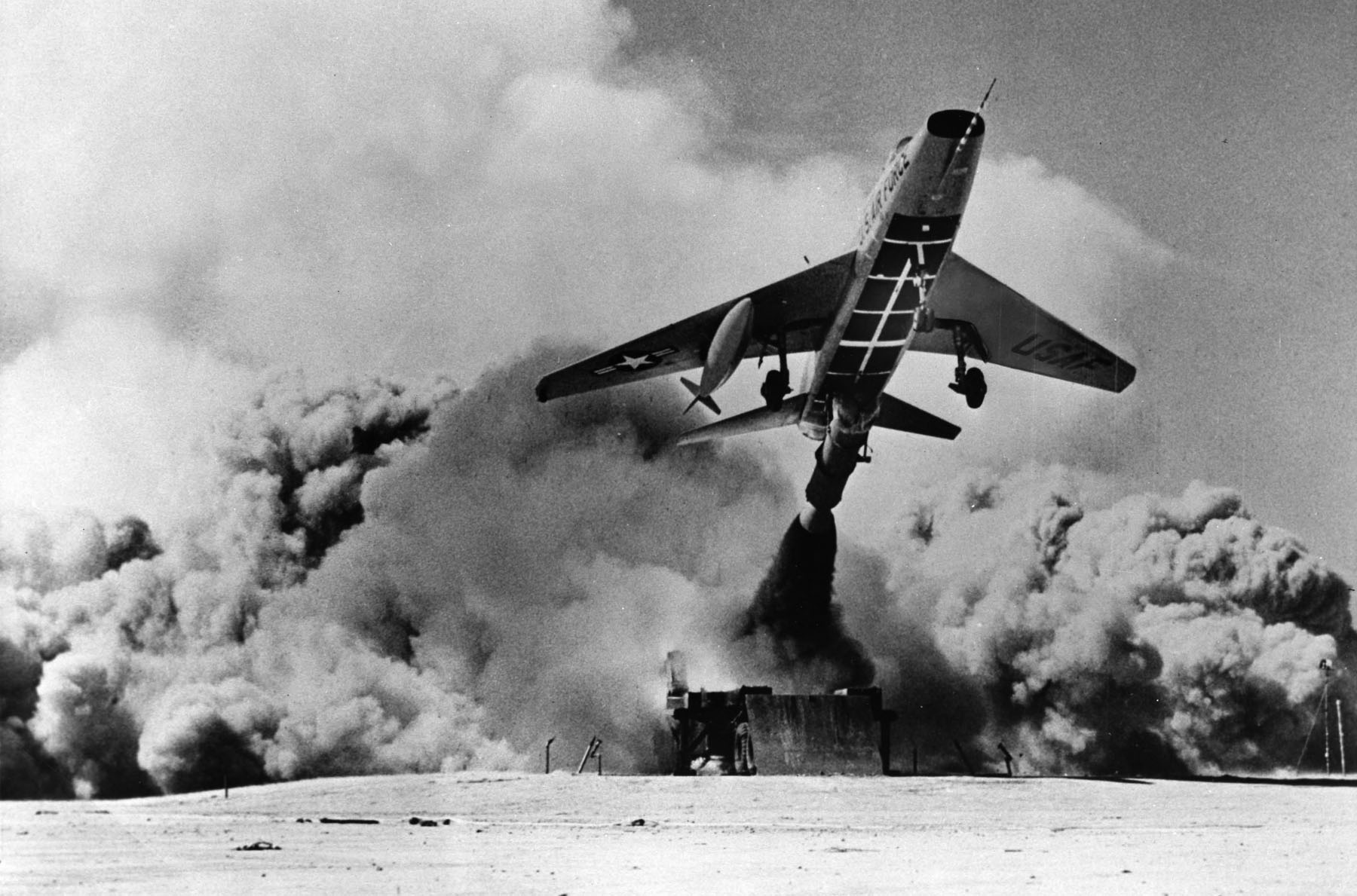
F-100D in trial of zero-length-launch system

On 26 March 1958, an F-100D fitted with an Astrodyne booster rocket making 150,000 lbf (670,000 N) of thrust successfully performed a zero-length launch. This was accomplished by adding a large canister to the underside of the aircraft, which contained a black powder compound and was ignited electromechanically, driving the jet engine to minimal ignition point. This capability was incorporated into late-production aircraft.

The F-100F two-seat trainer was accepted into USAF service in January 1958. It received many of the same weapons and airframe upgrades as the F-100D, including the new afterburners. Various modifications, largely focused on the structure, were made during the F-100F's service life; several were adapted with special equipment for electronic warfare operations and saw use in this capacity in Vietnam. By June 1970, 74 F-100Fs had been lost in major accidents. The pilot's operating manual warned that the F-100F would not recover from a spin. The model was phased out of USAF service in 1972.

On 15 July 1958, the 354th Tactical Fighter Wing deployed 29 F-100Ds and Fs to Incirlik Air Base during the 1958 Lebanon crisis to support the Marine landing in Beirut to form a composite air strike force with B-57s, RB-66s, C-124s, RF-101s, and C-130s. In August 1958, the USAF sent F-100Ds, F-101Cs, F-104As, and B-57Bs to Taiwan during the Second Taiwan Strait Crisis to demonstrate support for Taiwan.

By 1961, England AFB, Louisiana, (401st Tactical Wing) had four fighter-bomber squadrons, the 612th, 613th, 614th, and the 615th (Fighting Tigers). During the Berlin crisis (approximately September 1961), the 614th was deployed to Ramstein Air Base, Germany, to support the West Germans. At the initial briefing, the 614th personnel were informed that due to the close proximity of the USSR, if an ICBM were to be launched, they would have only 30 minutes to launch the 614th's aircraft and retire to the nearest German bunker.

During the Cuban Missile Crisis, 181 F-100s of the 31st Tactical Fighter Wing, 401st TFW, and 474th TFW were deployed to Homestead Air Force Base as a deterrent and for a potential strike on Cuba during the crisis. On 2 May 1965, 18 USAF F-100s flew from Ramey Air Force Base in Puerto Rico to support Operation Power Pack flying 313 combat sorties before returning to Myrtle Beach on 28 May.

De-classified Tactical Weapons Effects Tests of the US Air-Force Century-Series aircraft.

In 1966, the Combat Skyspot program fitted some F-100Ds with an X band radar transmitter to allow for ground-directed bombing in inclement weather or at night. In 1967, the USAF began a structural reinforcement program to extend the aircraft's service life from the designed 3,000 flying hours to 7,000. The USAF alone lost 500 F-100Ds, predominantly in accidents. After one aircraft suffered wing failure, particular attention was paid to lining the wings with external bracing strips. During the Vietnam War, combat losses constituted as many as 50 aircraft per year. After a major accident, the USAF Thunderbirds reverted from F-105 Thunderchiefs to the F-100D, which they operated from 1964 until it was replaced by the McDonnell Douglas F-4 Phantom II in 1968. (Note: Martin Caidin's book Thunderbirds was written while the team flew F-100s, he was the only journalist to ever fly with them.)

By 1972, the F-100 was mostly phased out of USAF active service and turned over to tactical fighter groups and squadrons in the ANG. In ANG units, the F-100 was eventually replaced by the F-4 Phantom II, LTV A-7D Corsair II, and Fairchild Republic A-10 Thunderbolt II, with the last F-100 retiring in 1979 as the General Dynamics F-16 Fighting Falcon was phased in. In foreign service, the Royal Danish Air Force and Turkish Air Force F-100s soldiered on until 1982.

Over the lifetime of its USAF service, 889 F-100s were destroyed in accidents, resulting in the deaths of 324 pilots. The deadliest year for F-100 accidents was 1958, which saw 116 aircraft destroyed and 47 pilots killed.

After F-100s were withdrawn from service, a large number were converted into remote-controlled drones (QF-100) under the USAF Full Scale Aerial Target (FSAT) program for use as targets for various antiaircraft weapons, including missile-carrying fighters and fighter-interceptors, with FSAT operations being conducted primarily at Tyndall AFB, Florida. A few F-100s also found their way into civilian hands, primarily with defense contractors supporting USAF and NASA flight test activities at Edwards AFB, California.

=== Project Slick Chick ===
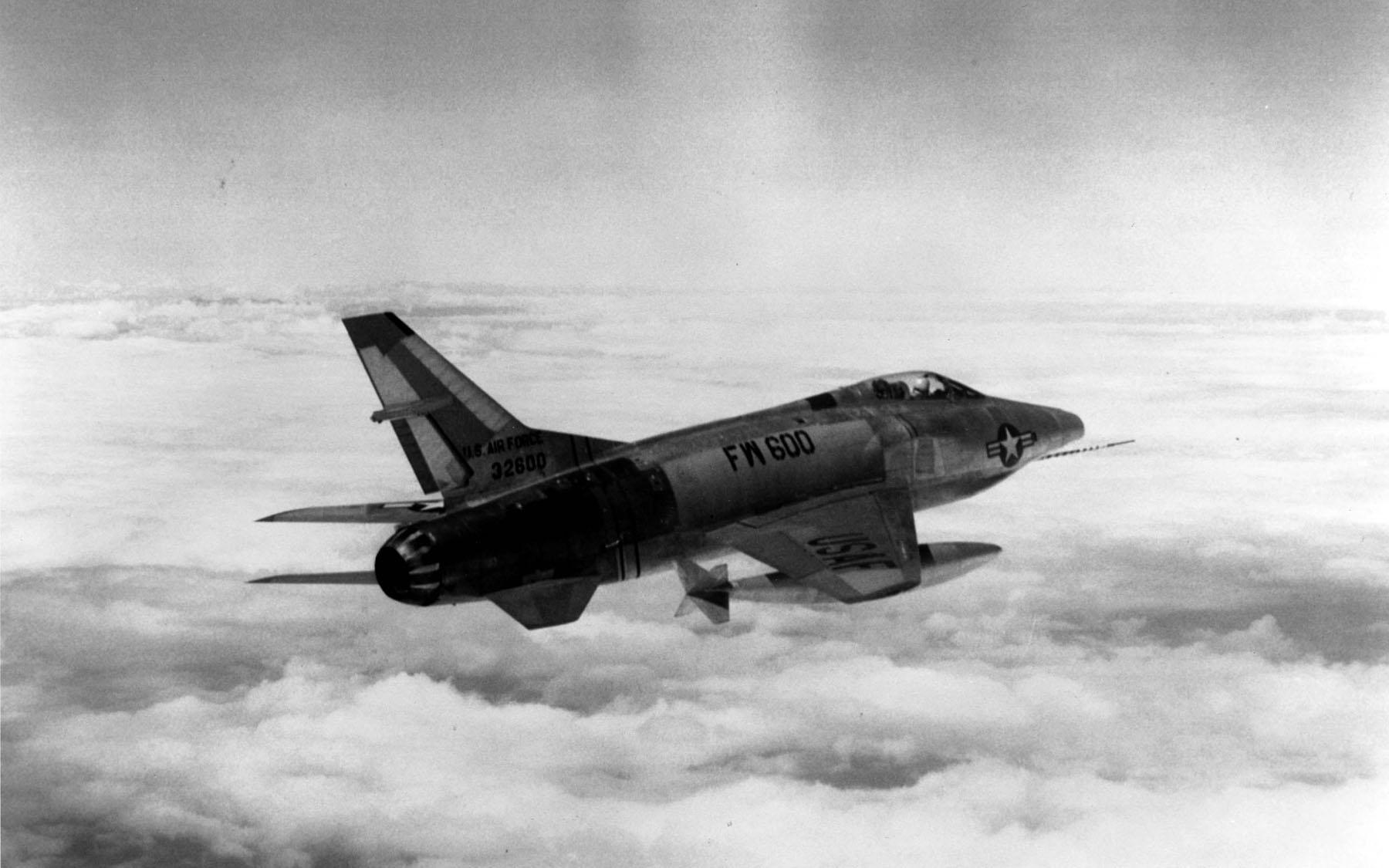
An RF-100A in flight, marked with the AF serial number of a Northrop F-89 Scorpion (53-2600)

North American received a contract to modify six F-100As to RF-100As carrying five cameras, three Fairchild K-17 cameras (see Fairchild K-20 camera) in a trimetrogon mounting for photo mapping and two Fairchild K-38 cameras in a split vertical mounting with the cameras mounted horizontally, shooting via a mirror angled at 45° to reduce the effects of airframe vibrations. All gun armament was removed, and the cameras installed in the gun and ammunition bays were covered by a bulged fairing under the forward fuselage.

Pilots trained on the F-100A at Edwards Air Force Base and George Air Force Base in California and then at Palmdale Air Force Base for training with the actual RF-100As with which they would be deployed. Flight tests revealed that the RF-100A in its intended operational fit of four external tanks was lacking in directional and longitudinal stability, requiring careful handling and close attention to speed limitations for the drop tanks.

Once pilot training was completed in April 1955, three aircraft were deployed to Bitburg Air Base in Germany, flying to Brookley AFB in Mobile, Alabama, cocooned, loaded on an aircraft carrier and delivered to Short Brothers at Sydenham, Belfast, for reassembly and flight preparation. At Bitburg, they were assigned to Detachment 1 of the 7407th Support Squadron, and commenced operations flying over Eastern Bloc countries at high altitude (over 50,000 ft) to acquire intelligence on military targets. Many attempts were made to intercept these aircraft to no avail, with some photos of fighter airfields clearly showing aircraft climbing for attempted intercepts. The European detachment probably only carried out six missions between mid-1955 and mid-1956 when the Lockheed U-2 took over as the deep-penetration aerial reconnaissance asset.

Three RF-100As were also deployed to the 6021st Reconnaissance Squadron at Yokota Air Base in Japan, but details of operations there are not available. Two RF-100As were lost in accidents, one due to probable overspeeding, which caused the separation of one of the drop tanks and resulted in complete loss of control, and the other due to an engine flame-out. In mid-1958, all four remaining RF-100As were returned to the US and later supplied to the Republic of China Air Force in Taiwan.

=== Project High Wire ===
F-100D Super Sabre delivering napalm during a military exercise

"High Wire" was a modernization program performed upon selected F-100Cs, F-100Ds and F-100Fs. It comprised two modifications - an electrical rewiring upgrade and a heavy maintenance and inspect-and-repair as necessary (IRAN) upgrade. Rewiring upgrade operations consisted of replacing old wiring and harnesses with improved maintainable designs. Heavy maintenance and IRAN included new kits, modifications, standardized configurations, repairs, replacements, and complete refurbishment.

This project required all new manuals and incremented (i.e. -85 to -86) block numbers. All later-production models, especially the F models, included earlier High Wire modifications. New manuals included colored illustrations and had the Roman numeral (I) added after the aircraft number (e.g. T.O. 1F-100D(I)-1S-120, 12 January 1970). High Wire modifications took 60 days per aircraft at a cost for the entire project of US$150 million.

=== Vietnam War ===
==== Fighter and close air support missions ====
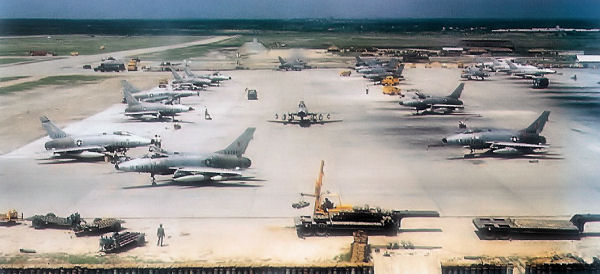
F-100Ds of the 416th Tactical Fighter Squadron at Bien Hoa Air Base, South Vietnam, in late June or early July 1965

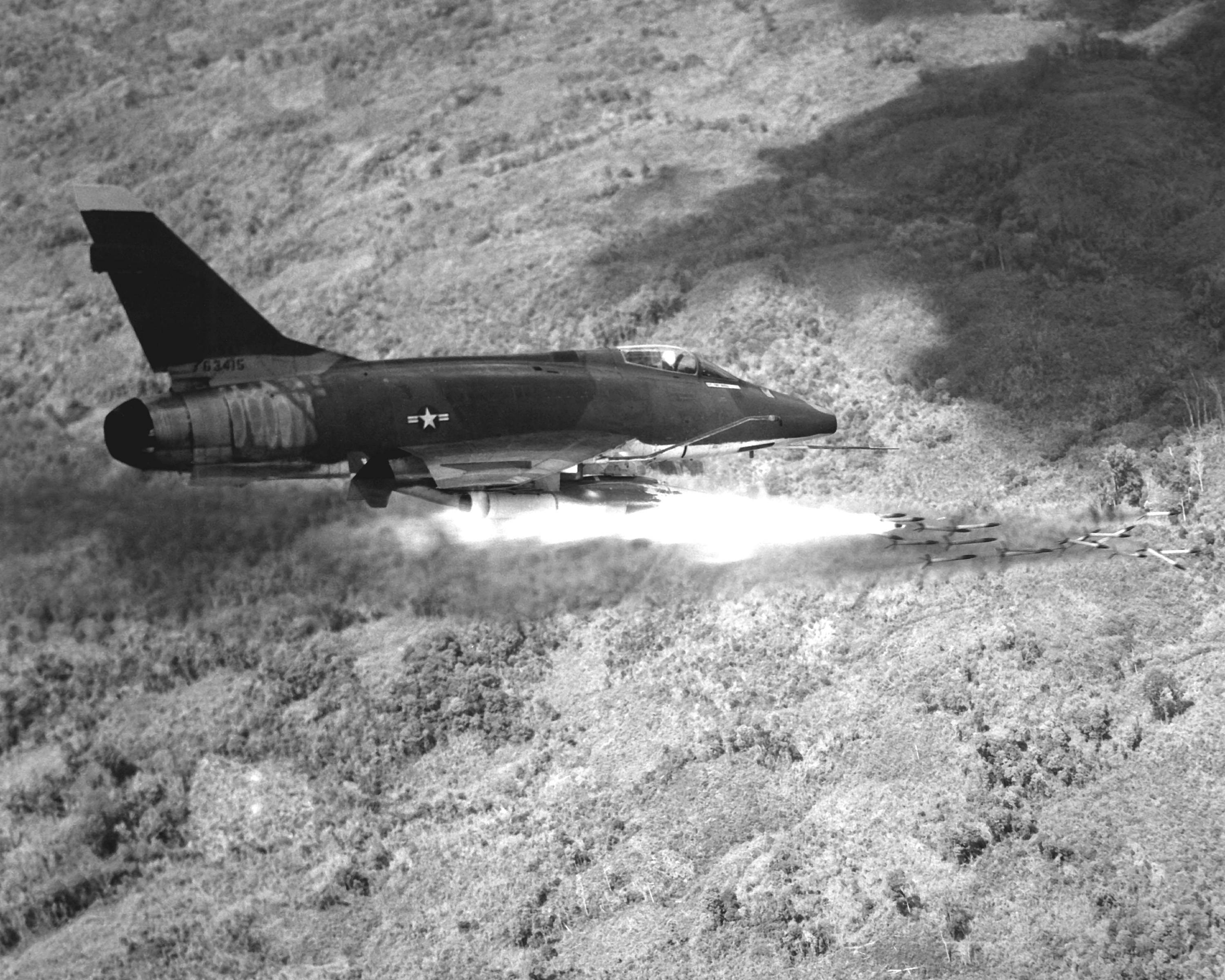
A USAF F-100D firing rockets in South Vietnam, 1967

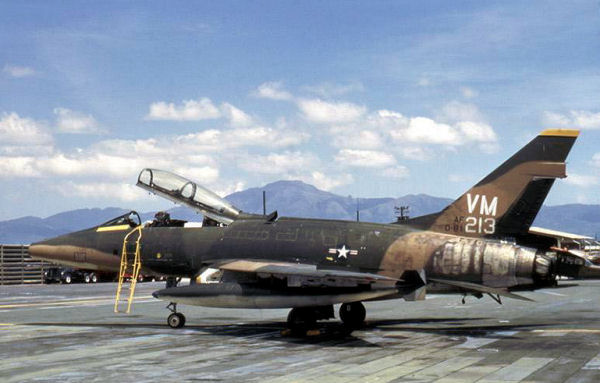
A USAF F-100F of the 352d TFS at Phu Cat Air Base, South Vietnam, 1971

On 16 April 1961, six Super Sabres were deployed from Clark Air Base in the Philippines to Don Muang Royal Thai Air Force Base in Thailand for air-defense purposes, the first F-100s to enter combat in Southeast Asia. From that date until their redeployment in 1971, the F-100s were the longest serving US jet fighter-bomber to fight in the Vietnam War. They served as MiG combat air patrol (CAP) escorts for F-105 Thunderchiefs, Misty forward air control (FAC), and Wild Weasel anti-air defense aircraft over North Vietnam, and were then relegated to close air support and ground attacks within South Vietnam.

On 18 August 1964, the first F-100D shot down by ground fire, piloted by 1st Lt Colin A. Clarke, of the 428th TFS; Clarke ejected and survived. On 4 April 1965, as escorts protecting F-105s attacking the Thanh Hoa Bridge, F-100 Super Sabres fought the USAF's first air-to-air jet combat duel in the Vietnam War, in which an F-100 piloted by Captain Donald W. Kilgus of the 416th Fighter Squadron shot down a North Vietnamese Air Force MiG-17, using cannon fire, while another fired AIM-9 Sidewinder missiles. The surviving North Vietnamese pilot confirmed three of the MiG-17s had been shot down. Although recorded by the US Air Force as a probable kill, this represented the first aerial victory by the US Air Force in Vietnam. The small force of four MiG-17s, though, had penetrated the escorting F-100s to claim two F-105s.

The F-100 was soon replaced by the F-4C Phantom II for MiG CAP, which pilots noted suffered for lacking built-in guns for dogfights.

The United States military in the Vietnam War was not known for using activated Army National Guard, Air National Guard, or other US Reserve units, but rather, relying on conscription during the course of the war. During a confirmation hearing before Congress in 1973, Air Force General George S. Brown, who had commanded the 7th Air Force during the war, stated that five of the best Super Sabre squadrons in Vietnam were from the Air National Guard. This included the (120 TFS) of the Colorado Air National Guard, the 136 TFS of the New York Air National Guard TFS, the 174 TFS of the Iowa Air National Guard, and the 188 TFS of the New Mexico Air National Guard. The fifth unit was a regular AF squadron manned by mostly air national guardsmen.

The Air National Guard F-100 squadrons increased the regular USAF by nearly 100 Super Sabres in theater, averaging, for the Colorado ANG F-100s, 24 missions a day, delivering ordnance and munitions with a 99.5% reliability rate. From May 1968 to April 1969, the ANG Super Sabres flew more than 38,000 combat hours and more than 24,000 sorties. Between them, at the cost of seven F-100 Air Guard pilots killed (plus one staff officer) and the loss of 14 Super Sabres to enemy action, the squadrons expended over four million rounds of 20 mm shells, 30 million pounds of bombs and over 10 million pounds of napalm against their enemy.

The Hun was also deployed as a two-seat F-100F model, which served as a "fast FAC" or Misty FAC in North Vietnam and Laos, spotting targets for other fighter-bomber aircraft, performing road reconnaissance, and conducting search-and-rescue missions as part of the top-secret Commando Sabre project, based out of Phu Cat and Tuy Hoa air bases.

By the conflict's end, 242 F-100s of various models had been lost in Vietnam, as the F-100 was progressively replaced by the F-4 Phantom II and the F‑105 Thunderchief. The Hun had logged 360,283 combat sorties during the war and its wartime operations came to end on 31 July 1971. The four fighter wings with F-100s flew more combat sorties in Vietnam than over 15,000 North American P-51 Mustangs had flown during World War II. After 1967, they did not fly into North Vietnam as much and mainly performed close air-support missions for American units in the South. Despite the April 1965 dogfight, which the USAF classified as resulting in a "probable" kill, no F-100 was ever officially credited with any aerial victories. No F-100 in Vietnam was lost to enemy fighters, but 186 were shot down by antiaircraft fire, 7 were destroyed in Vietcong attacks on airbases, and 45 crashed in operational incidents.

==== Wild Weasel ====
The F-100 was also the first Wild Weasel air defense suppression aircraft, whose specially trained crews were tasked with locating and destroying enemy missile defenses. Four F-100F Wild Weasels were fitted with APR-25 vector radar homing and warning receivers, IR-133 panoramic receivers with greater detection range, and KA-60 panoramic cameras. The APR-25 could detect early-warning radars and emissions from SA-2 Guideline tracking and guidance systems. These aircraft deployed to Korat Royal Thai Air Force Base, Thailand, in November 1965, began flying combat missions with the 388th Tactical Fighter Wing in December. They were joined by three more aircraft in February 1966. All Wild Weasel F-100Fs were eventually modified to fire the AGM-45 Shrike anti-radiation missile.

=== Algerian war ===
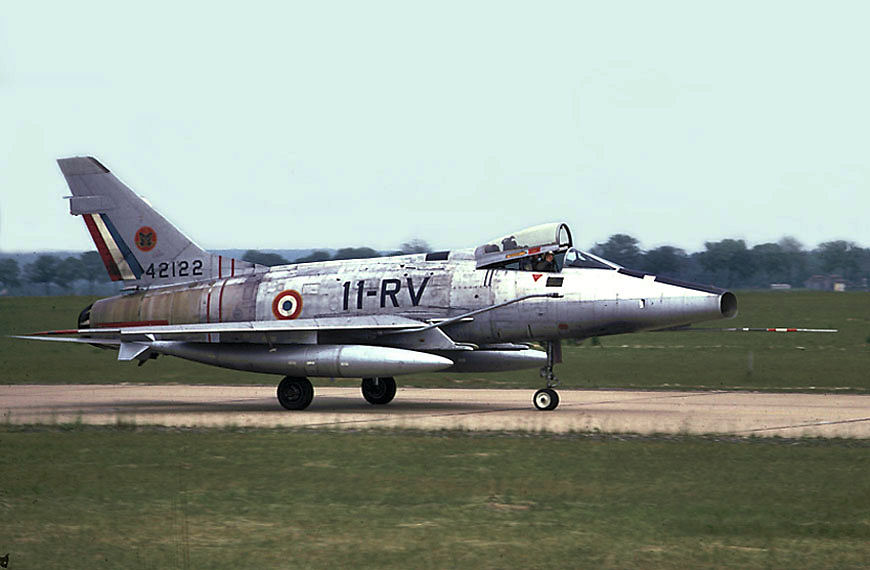
F-100D 54-2122 (the second receipt by the French Air Force) with the colors of the 3/11 "Corse" at Toul-Rosières Air Base in June 1970

French Air Force Super Sabres of the EC 1/3 Navarre flew combat missions, striking from bases within France against targets in French Algeria. The planes were based at Reims, refueling at Istres on the return flight from Algeria. The F-100 was the main fighter-bomber operated by the French Air Force during the 1960s until the type was replaced by the SEPECAT Jaguar.

=== Turkey ===
Turkish Air Force F-100 units were used during the Turkish invasion of Cyprus in 1974. Together with Lockheed F-104G Starfighters, they provided close air support to Turkish ground troops and bombed targets around Nicosia. Following previous intrusions in Soviet air space, on 24 August 1976, a pair of Turkish Air Force F-100s entered into the Soviet Union airspace. While three Su-15s were intercepting the intruders, a ground based Soviet SAM battery shot down one of the Turkish F-100s. In March 1987, Turkish Super Sabres bombed PKK bases in northern Iraq. On 14 September 1983, a pair of Turkish Air Force F-100F Super Sabres of 182 Filo “Atmaca” penetrated Iraqi airspace. A Dassault Mirage F1EQ of the Iraqi Air Force intercepted the flight and fired a Super 530F-1 missile at them. One of the Turkish fighters (s/n 56-3903) was shot down and crashed in Zakho valley near the Turkish-Iraqi border. The aircraft's pilots reportedly survived the crash and were returned to Turkey. The incident was not made public by either side, although some details surfaced in later years. The incident was officially revealed in 2012 by Turkish Defence Minister İsmet Yılmaz, in response to a parliamentary question by Republican People's Party (CHP) MP Metin Lütfi Baydar in the aftermath of the downing of a Turkish F-4 Phantom II in Syria, in 2012.

=== Taiwan ===
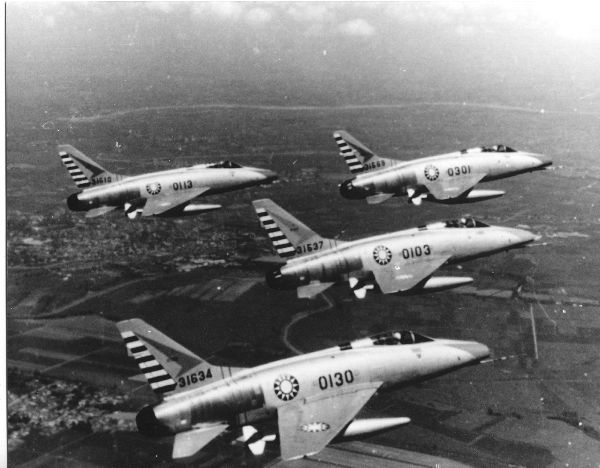
Taiwanese F-100As in flight

Taiwan took delivery of 119 F-100As, 4 RF-100As, and 14 F-100Fs, and lost a number of F-100As and Fs in the course of service, but never lost a single RF-100A in either combat or accident. Those four RF-100As had never been sent on a reconnaissance mission over mainland China, as they could only produce photographic images of mediocre quality at best. Moreover, after each flying hour, the ground personnel had to spend over 100 hours on the aircraft maintenance. All of the RF-100As were returned to the US after one year and 11 months (1 January 1959 – 1 December 1960) in ROCAF service.

=== Achievements ===
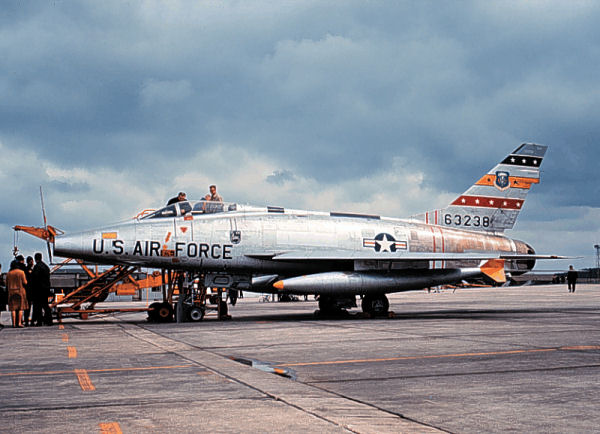
F-100D of the 417th TFS, 50th TFW post January 1965 ("buzz number" painted over)

- The first operational aircraft in United States Air Force inventory capable of exceeding the speed of sound in level flight.
- On 29 October 1953, the first YF-100A prototype set a world speed record of 755.149 mph (656.207 kn, 1,215.295 km/h) at low altitude.
- On 20 August 1955, an F-100C set a supersonic world speed record of 822.135 mph (714.416 kn, 1,323.098 km/h).
- On 4 September 1955, an F-100C won the Bendix Trophy, covering 2,235 mi (2,020 nmi, 3,745 km) at an average speed of 610.726 mph (530.706 kn, 982.868 km/h).
- On 26 December 1956, two F-100Ds became the first-ever aircraft to successfully perform buddy refueling.
- On 13 May 1957, three F-100Cs set a new world distance record for single-engine aircraft by covering the 6,710 mi (5,835 nmi, 10,805 km) distance from London to Los Angeles in 14 hours and 4 minutes. The flight was accomplished using inflight refueling.
- On 7 August 1959, two F-100Fs became the first-ever jet fighters to fly over the North Pole.
- On 16 April 1961, the first USAF combat jets to enter the Vietnam War.
- On 4 April 1965, the first USAF aircraft to engage in aerial jet combat during the Vietnam War, while escorting F-105 Thunderchiefs to target.
- The United States Air Force Thunderbirds operated the F-100C from 1956 until 1964. After briefly converting to the F-105 Thunderchief, the team flew F-100Ds from July 1964 until November 1968, before converting to the F-4E Phantom II.

=== Costs ===
The costs are in contemporary United States dollars and have not been adjusted for inflation.

	F-100A	F-100C	F-100D	F-100F
R&D	23.2 million for the program or 10,134 prorated per aircraft			
Airframe	748,259	439,323	448,216	577,023
Engine	217,390	178,554	162,995	143,527
Electronics	8,549	12,050	10,904	13,667
Armament	19,905	21,125	66,230	66,332
Ordnance	20,807	12,125	8,684	3,885
Flyaway cost	1,014,910	663,181	697,029	804,445
Additional modification costs		224,048	110,559	105,604
Cost per flying hour			583	583
Maintenance cost per flying hour	215	249	249	249

== Variants ==
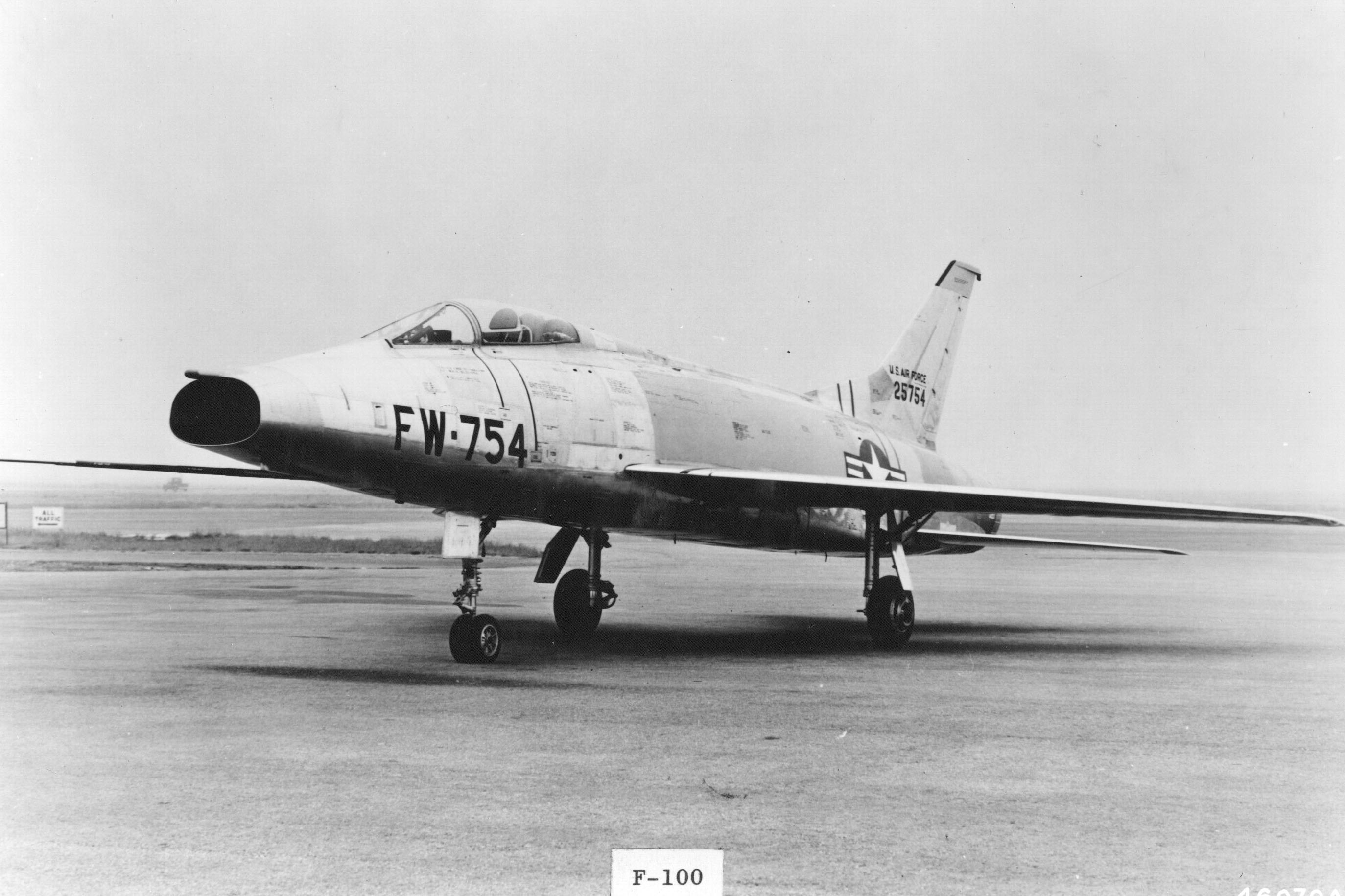
Prototype YF-100A (s/n 52-5754)

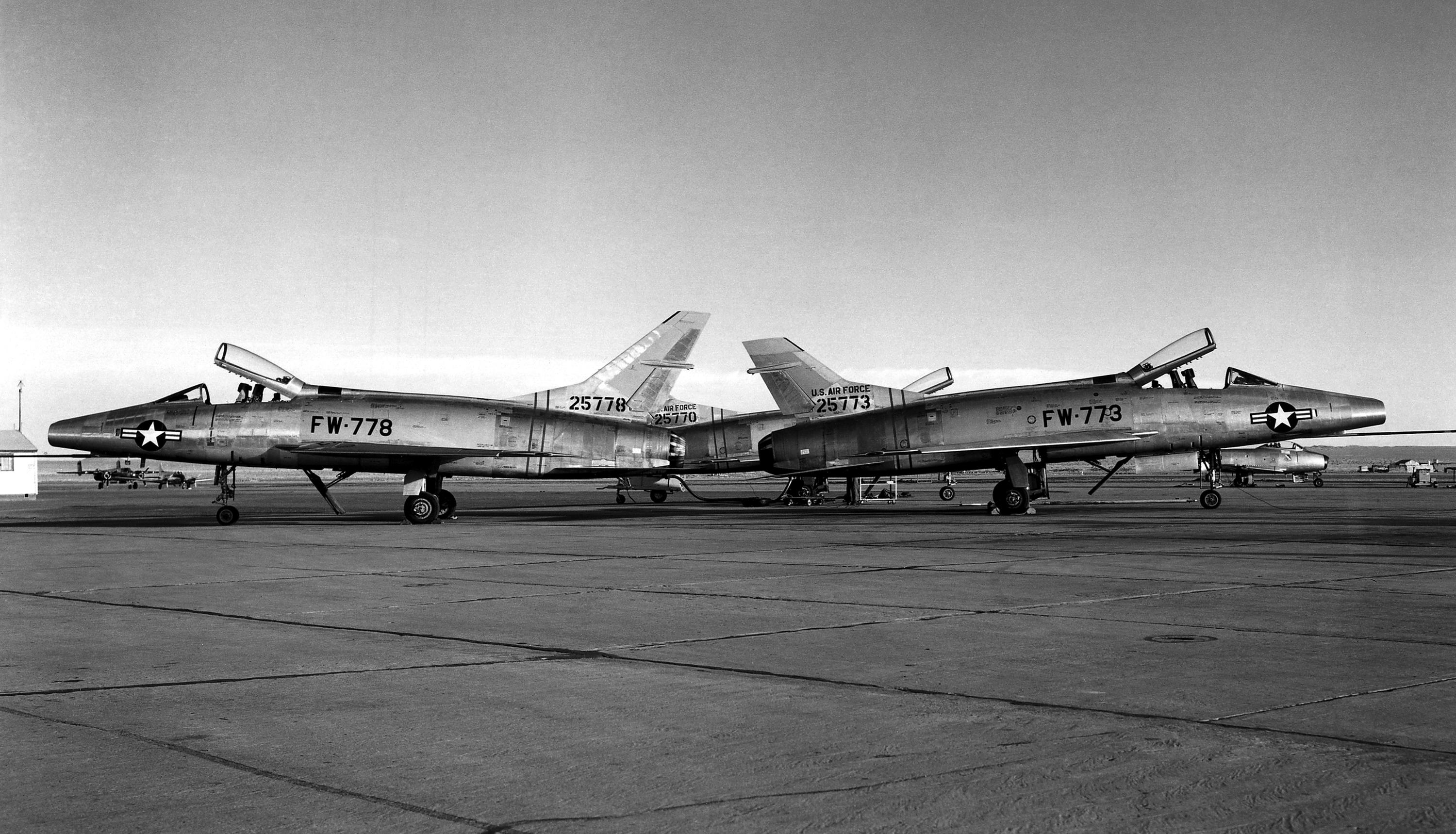
F-100As different tail fins, 1955

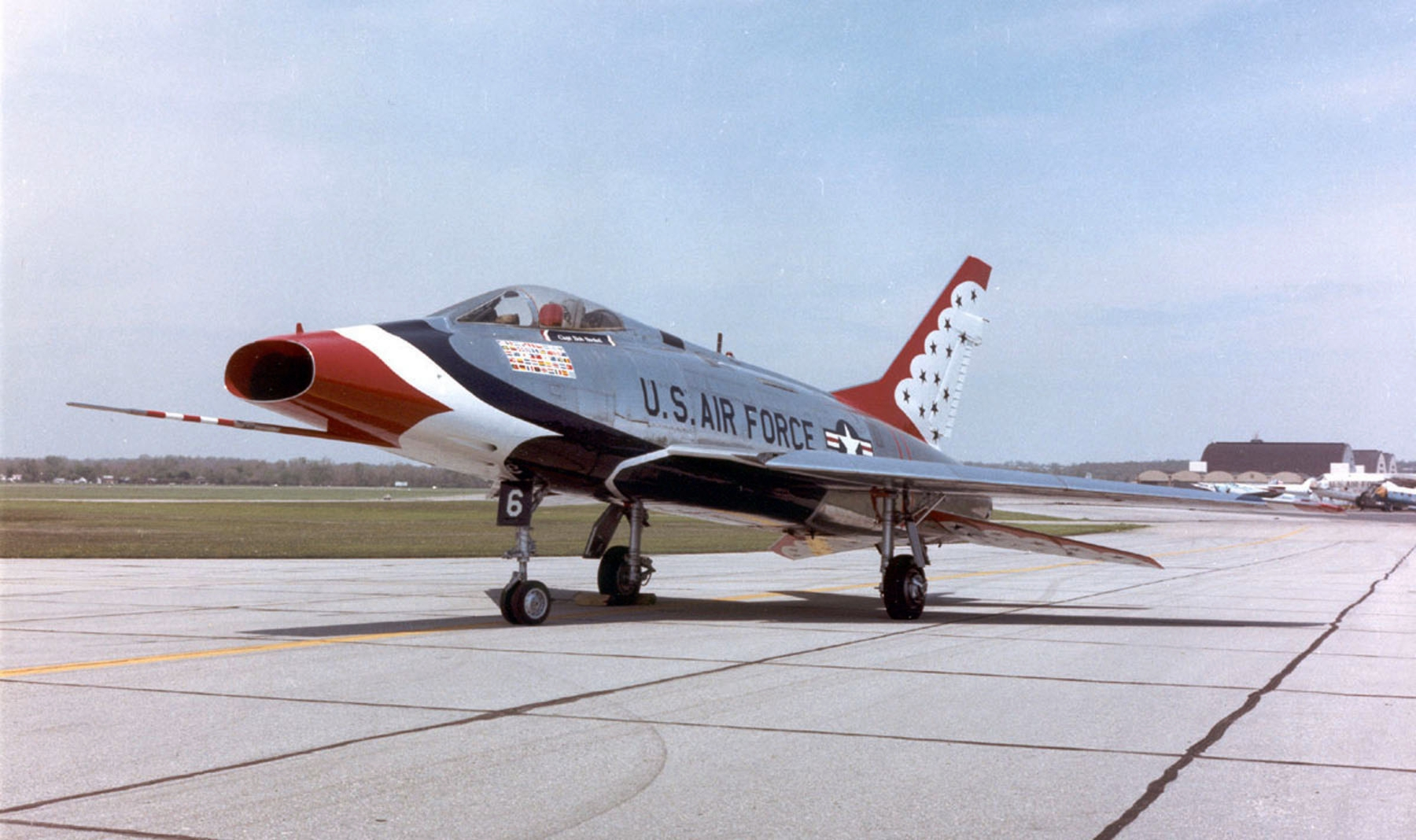
An F-100D of the United States Air Force Thunderbirds on display at the National Museum of the United States Air Force

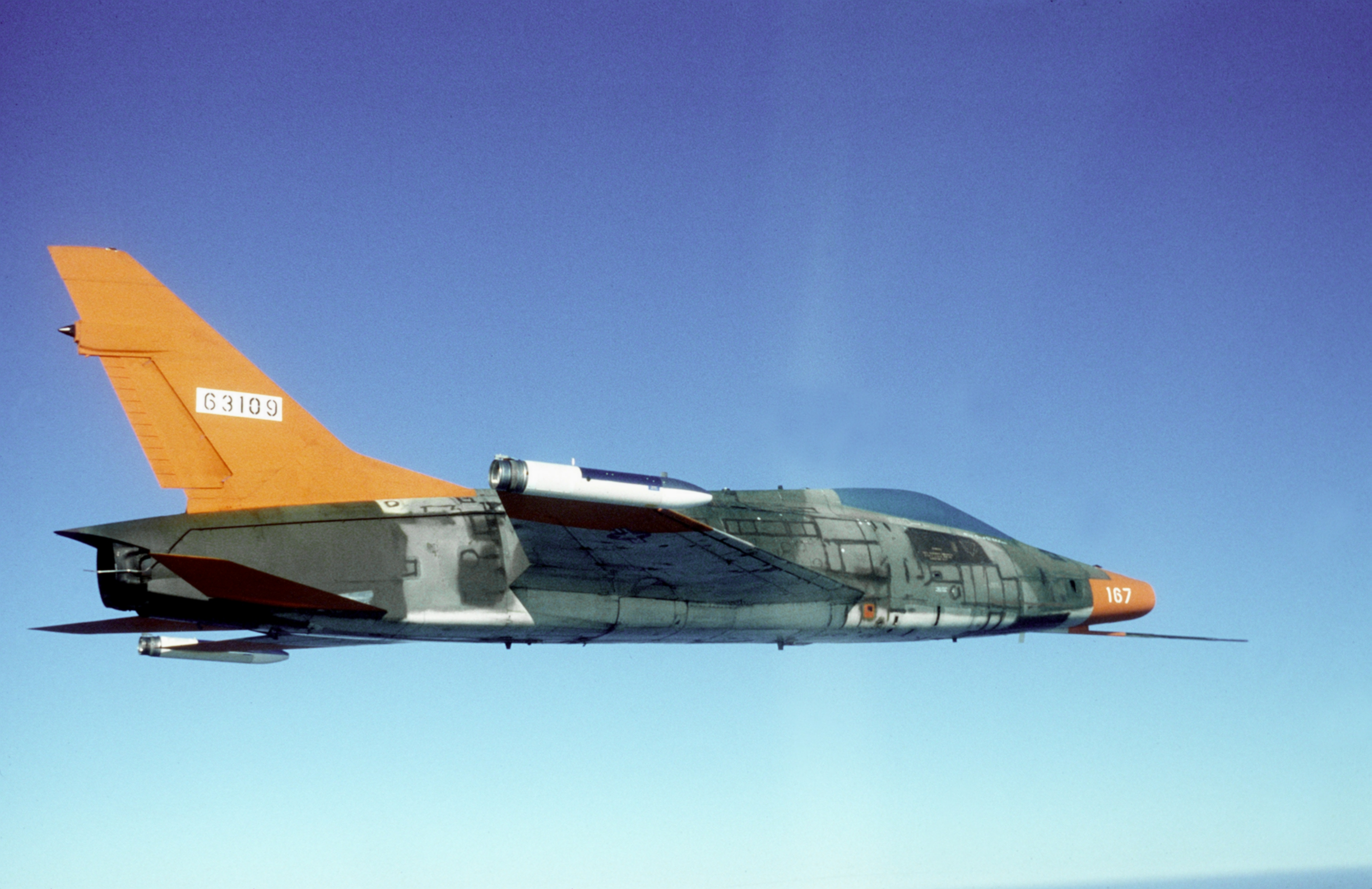
A QF-100D pilotless drone near Tyndall Air Force Base, Florida, in 1986.

YF-100A
Prototype, model NA-180 two built, s/n 52-5754 and 5755.
YQF-100
Nine test unmanned drone version: two D-models, one YQF-100F F-model,^{see DF-100F} and six other test versions.
F-100A
Single-seat day fighter; 203 built, model NA-192.
RF-100A ("Slick Chick")
Six F-100A aircraft modified for photo reconnaissance in 1954. Unarmed, with camera installations in lower fuselage bay. Used for overflights of Soviet Bloc countries in Europe and the Far-East. Retired from USAF service in 1958, the surviving four aircraft were transferred to the Republic of China Air Force and retired in 1960.
F-100B
See North American F-107
F-100BI
Proposed interceptor version of F-100B, did not advance beyond mock-up.
F-100C
Seventy Model NA-214 and 381 Model NA-217. Additional fuel tanks in the wings, fighter-bomber capability, probe-and-drogue refueling capability, uprated J57-P-21 engine on late production aircraft. First flight: March 1954; 476 built.
TF-100C
One F-100C converted into a two-seat training aircraft.
F-100D
Single-seat fighter-bomber, more advanced avionics, larger wing and tail fin, landing flaps. First flight: 24 January 1956; 1,274 built.
F-100F
Two-seat training version, armament decreased from four to two cannon. Also converted for use as a Wild Weasel variant. First flight: 7 March 1957; 339 built.
DF-100F
This designation was given to one F-100F that was used as drone director.
NF-100F
Three F-100Fs used for test purposes, the prefix "N" indicates that modifications prevented return to regular operational service.
TF-100F
Specific Danish designation given to 14 F-100Fs exported to Denmark in 1974 in order to distinguish these from the 10 F-100Fs delivered 1959–1961.
QF-100
Another 209 D and F models were ordered and converted to unmanned radio-controlled Full Scale Aerial Target drones and drone directors for testing and destruction by modern air-to-air missiles used by current US Air Force fighter jets.
F-100J
Unbuilt all-weather export version for Japan
F-100K
Unbuilt design study for a two-seat F-100F powered by a J57-P-55 engine
F-100L
Unbuilt design study for a single-seat F-100D powered by a J57-P-55 engine
F-100N
Unbuilt version with simplified avionics for NATO customers
F-100S
Proposed French-built F-100F with Rolls-Royce Spey turbofan engine

== Operators ==
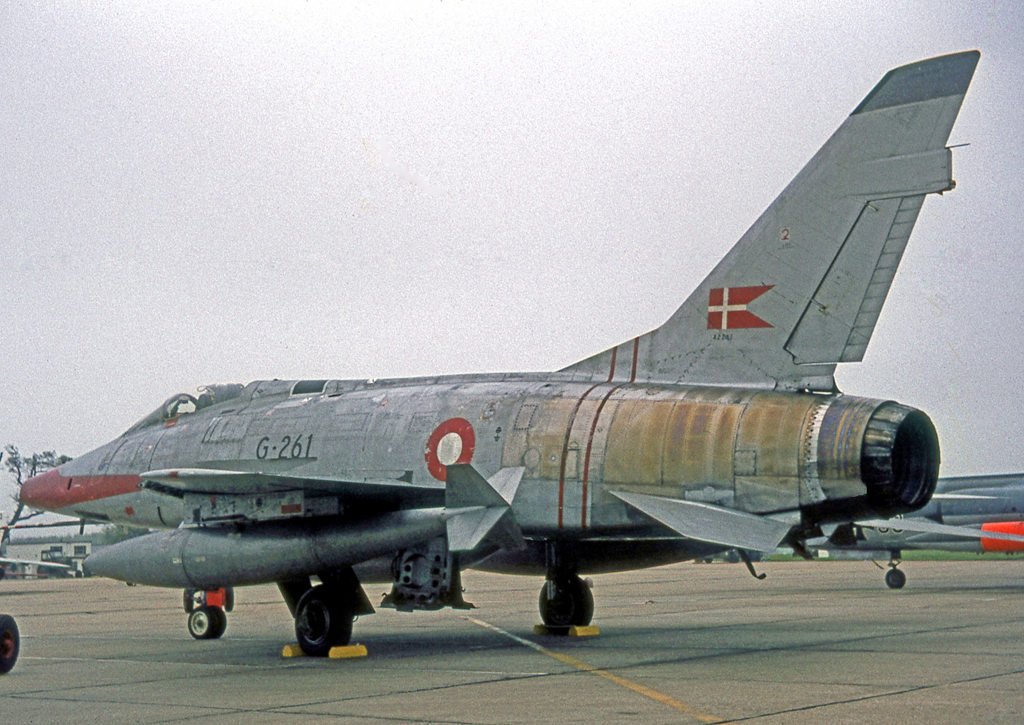
Operational Danish AF F-100D Super Sabre in 1965

Denmark

- Royal Danish Air Force

Flyvevåbnet operated a total of 72 aircraft. 48 F-100Ds and 10 Fs were delivered to Denmark from 1959 to 1961 as MDAP equipment. The F-100 replaced the Republic F-84G Thunderjet as a strike fighter in three squadrons; 725, 727 and 730. The F-100s of Eskadrille 725 were replaced by the Saab J35 Draken in 1970 and in 1974 14 two-seated ex-USAF TF-100F were bought. The last Danish F-100s were retired from service in 1982, replaced by F-16s. The surviving MDAP F-100s were transferred to Turkey (21 F-100Ds and two F-100Fs), while six TF-100Fs were sold for target towing.
France

- French Air Force

The Armée de l'Air was the first non-US air force to receive the F-100 Super Sabre. The first aircraft arrived in France on 1 May 1958. A total of 100 aircraft (85 F-100Ds and 15 F-100Fs) were supplied to France and assigned to the NATO 4th Allied Tactical Air Force. They were stationed at German-French bases. French F-100s were used on combat missions flying from bases in France against targets in Algeria. In 1967, France withdrew from NATO's military command structure, and German-based F-100s were transferred to bases in France vacated by the USAF. The last unit using the F100D/F was the Escadron 4/11 Jura, based at Djibouti, which kept the Super Sabre until 1978.
Republic of China

- Republic of China Air Force

The only non-US air force to operate the F-100A model. The first F-100 was delivered in October 1958. It was followed by 15 F-100As in 1959, and by 65 more F-100As in 1960. In 1961, four unarmed RF-100As were delivered. Additionally, 38 ex-USAF/Air National Guard F-100As were delivered later, to bring the total strength to 118 F-100As and four RF-100As. F-100As were retrofitted with the F-100D vertical tail with its AN/APS-54 tail-warning radar and equipped to launch AIM-9 Sidewinder air-to-air missiles.
Turkey

- Turkish Air Force

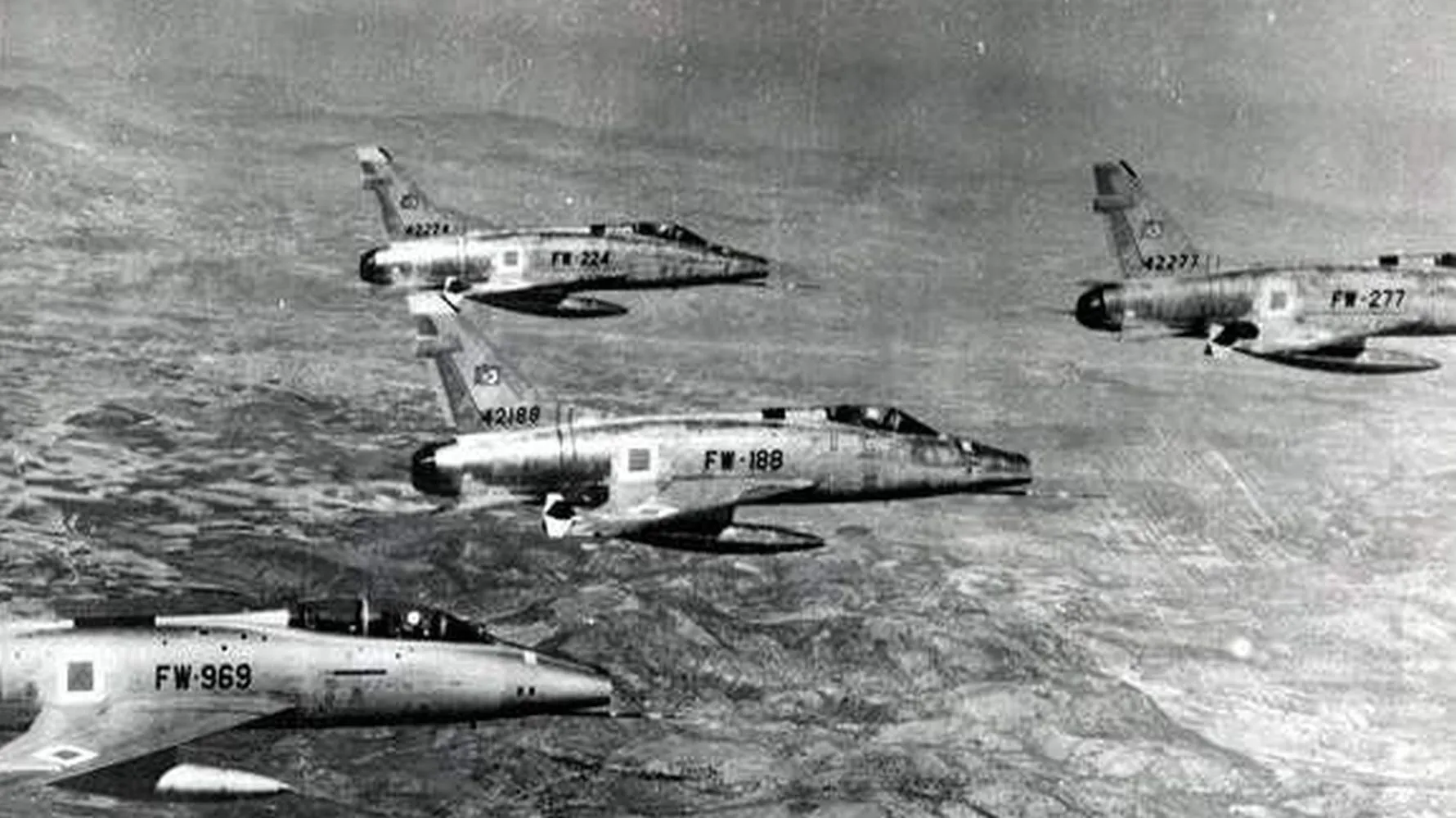
Turkish Air Force F-100 Super Sabre's during the Turkish invasion of Cyprus

The Türk Hava Kuvvetleri received 206 F-100C, D and F Super Sabres. Most came from USAF stocks, and 21 F-100Ds and two F-100Fs were supplied by Denmark. Turkish F-100s saw extensive action during the 1974 invasion of Cyprus.
United States

- United States Air Force
- United States Air Force Thunderbirds

List of F-100 units of the United States Air Force

== Surviving aircraft ==
=== Denmark ===
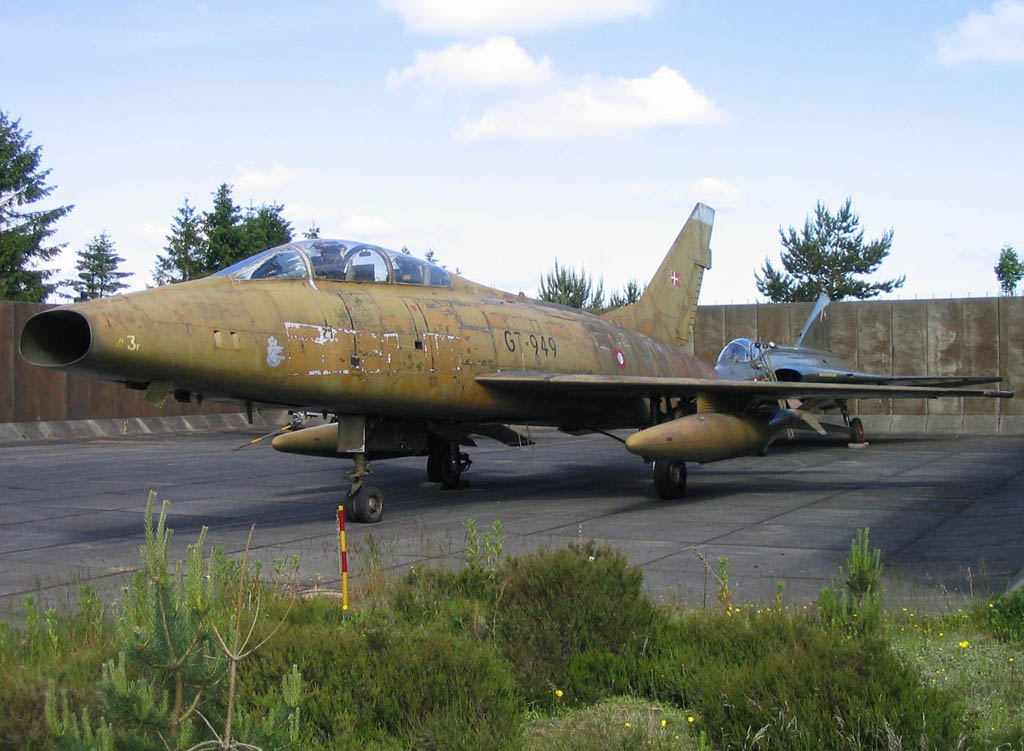
Retired RDAF F-100F Super Sabre

F-100F

- 56-3927/GT-927 – Denmark Flying Museum, Stauning

=== France ===
F-100D

- 55-2736 – Musée de l'Air et de l'Espace, Paris / Le Bourget.

=== Germany ===
F-100D

- 54-2136 French Air Force – Schwäbisches Bauern Technical Museum, Eschach-Seifertshofen.
- 54-2185 French Air Force – Schwäbisches Bauern Technical Museum, Eschach-Seifertshofen.

F-100F

- 56-3944 United States Air Force – Flugausstellung Peter Junior, Hermeskeil.

=== Netherlands ===
F-100D

- 54-2265 – (painted as 54–1871, 32nd FIS) – On display at the Nationaal Militair Museum, Soesterberg. After service with the French Air Force it was returned to USAF, repainted in USAF markings and in 1976 to gate guardian at RAF Wethersfield, England. It was then removed 20 January 1988 and reported at the time to be destined for AMARC, to be held in storage on behalf of USAFM (now NMUSAF).

=== Taiwan ===
F-100A

- 53-1550 – Taiwan International (Chiang Kai Shek).
- 53-1571 – Tamkang University.
- 53-1577 – National Tainan Industrial Vocational High School Aircraft Maintenance Department.
- 53-1589 – National Taiwan University.
- 53-1696 – Chung Cheng Armed Forces Preparatory School, CCAFPS.

=== Turkey ===
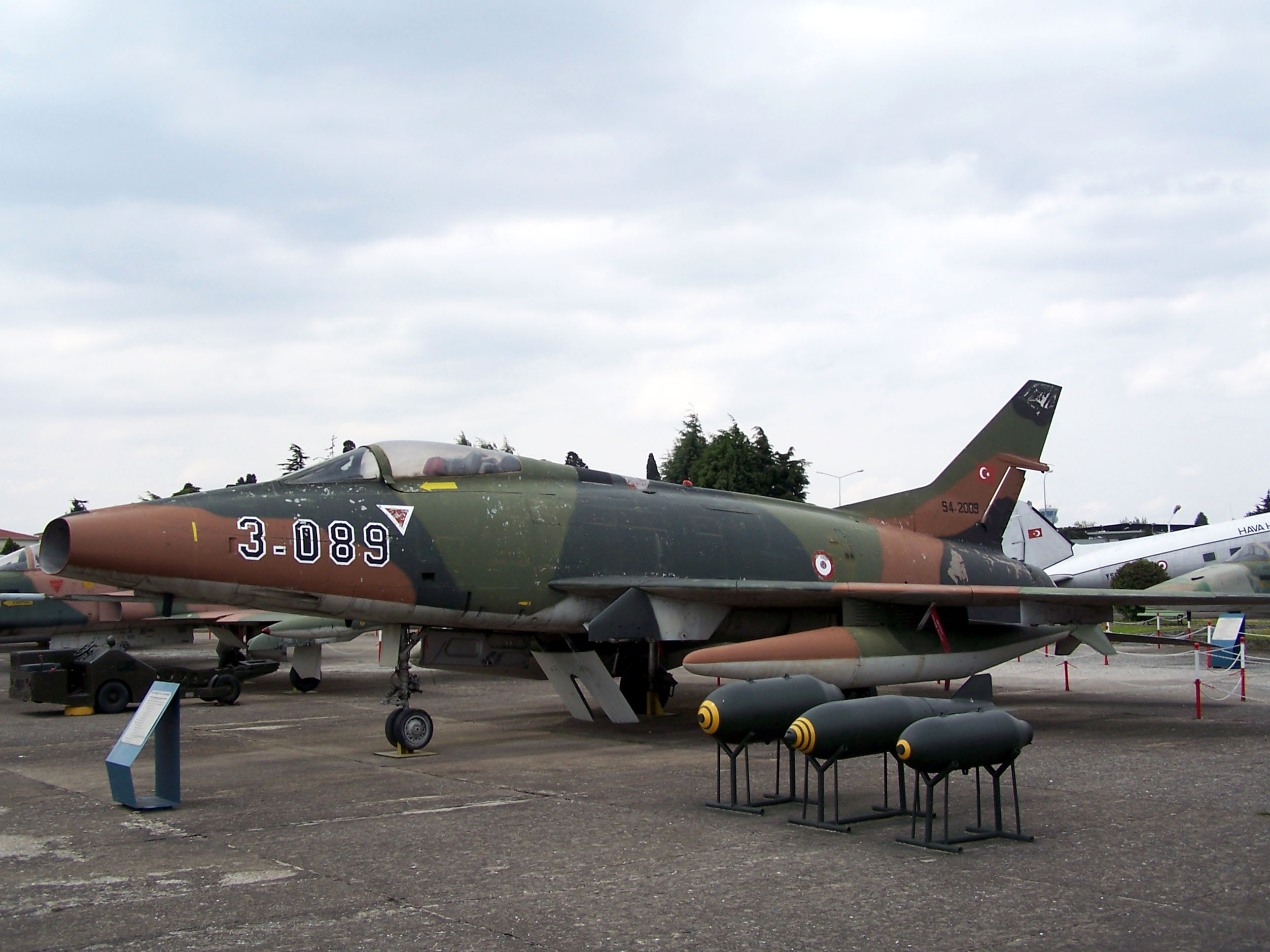
F-100C "3-089" at Istanbul Aviation Museum, Turkey

F-100C

- 54-2009/3-089 – Istanbul Aviation Museum, Istanbul.

F-100D

- 54-2245/E-245 – Istanbul Aviation Museum, Istanbul.

F-100F

- 56-3788/8-788 – Istanbul Aviation Museum, Istanbul.

=== United Kingdom ===
F-100D

- 54-2157 – North East Land, Sea and Air Museums, Sunderland.
- 54-2165 – Imperial War Museum, Duxford
- 54-2174 – Midland Air Museum, Coventry.
- 54-2196 – Norfolk and Suffolk Aviation Museum, Bungay.
- 54-2223 – Newark Air Museum, Newark-on-Trent.
- 54-2163 – Dumfries and Galloway Aviation Museum, Dumfries.

F-100F

- 56-3938 French Air Force – Lashenden Air Warfare Museum, Ashford where an aircraft accident at the museum damaged 938 and the remains were shipped to the National Museum of the United States Air Force at Wright-Patterson AFB in Dayton, Ohio, United States.

=== United States ===
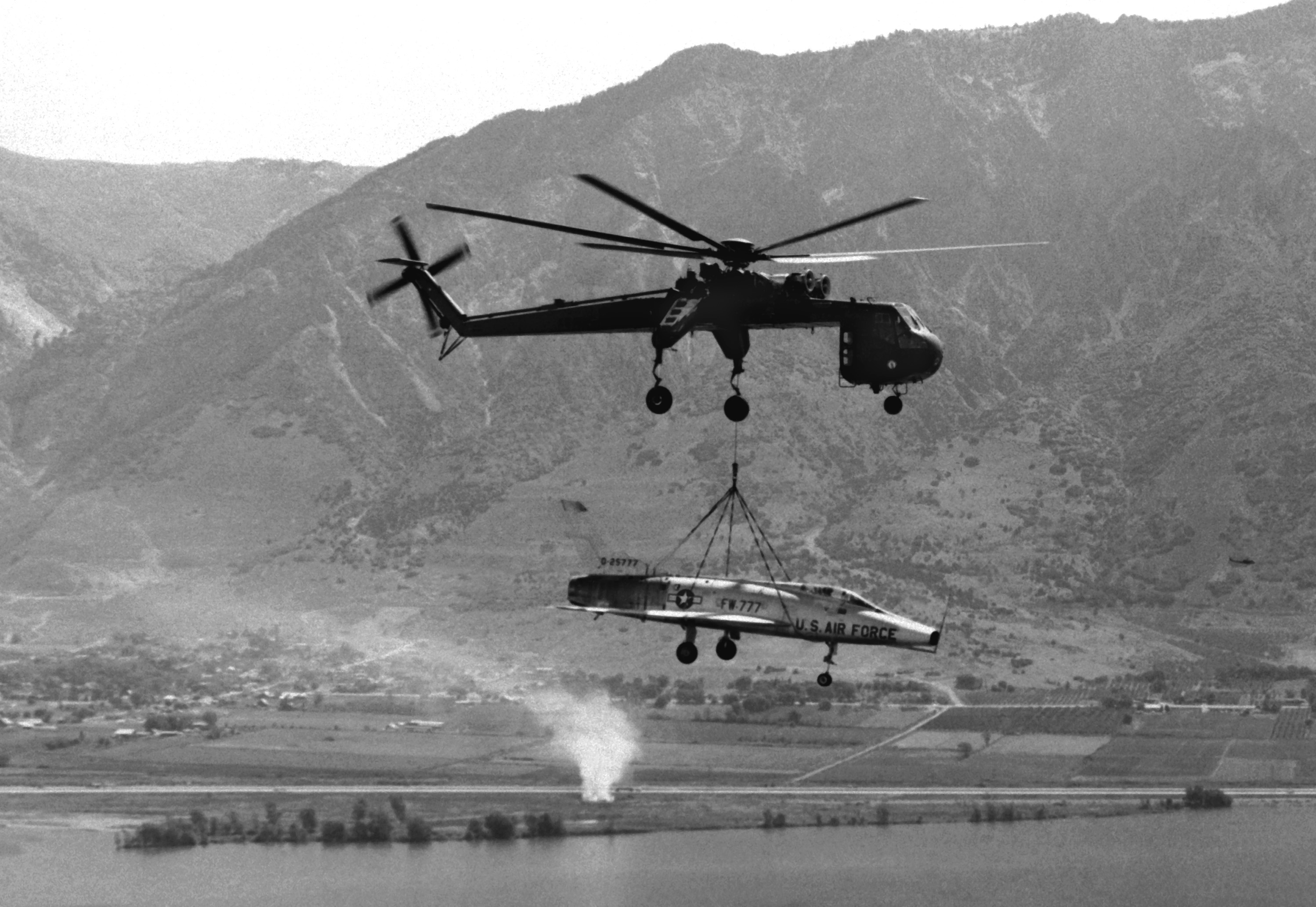
A Sikorsky CH-54 Tarhe lifting an F-100A to Hill Air Force Base, Utah for static display, 1979

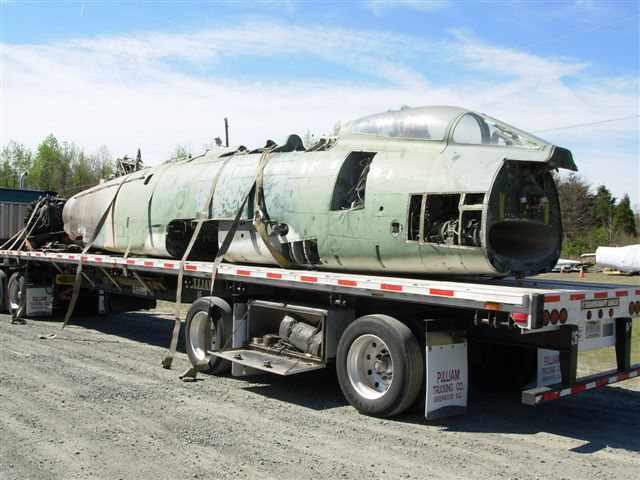
F-100D delivered to Carolinas Aviation Museum

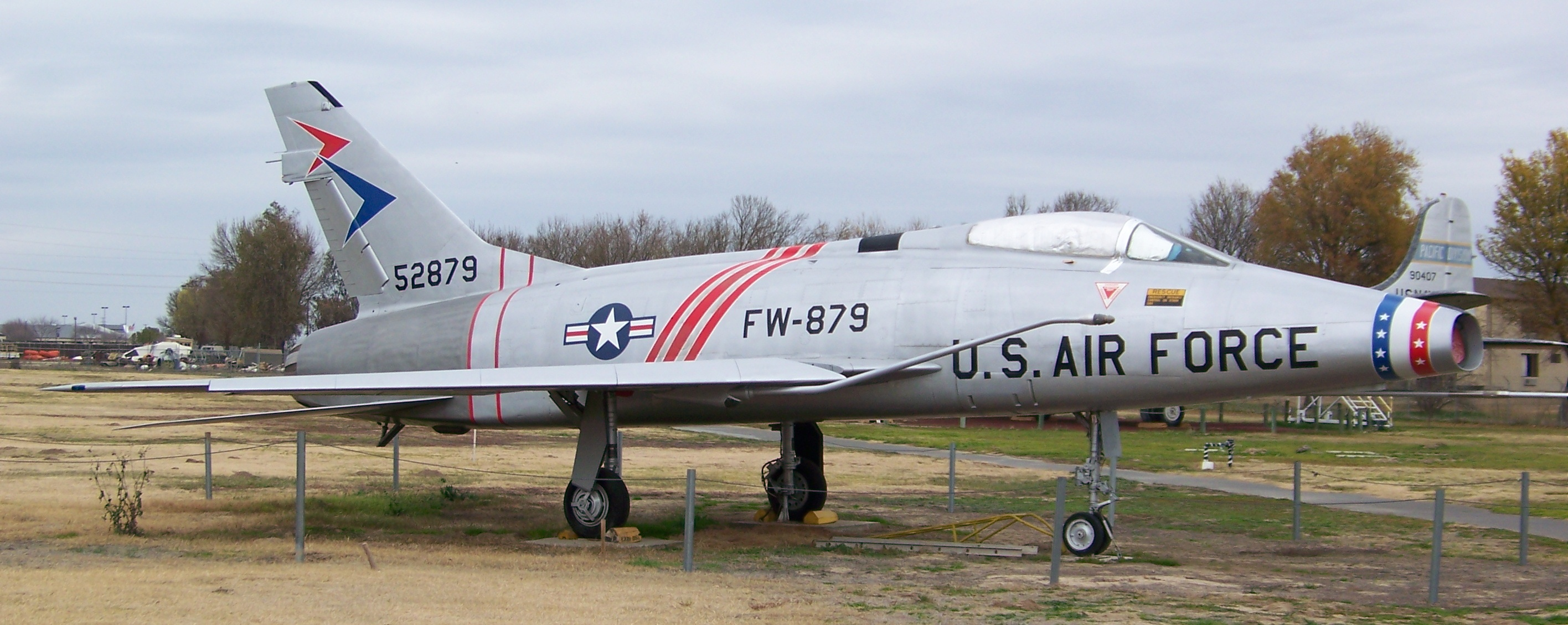
Hun at Castle Air Museum, California

==== Airworthy ====
F-100F

- 56-3844 – Collings Foundation in Stow, Massachusetts.
- 56-3916 – privately owned in Belgrade, Montana.
- 56-3948 – privately owned in Fort Wayne, Indiana.
- 56-3971 – privately owned in Belgrade, Montana.

==== On display ====
===== YF-100A =====
- 52-5755 – Century Circle, West Gate at Air Force Flight Test Center Museum, Edwards AFB, California.

===== F-100A =====
- 52-5759 – USAF Airman Heritage Museum, Lackland AFB, Texas.
- 52-5760 – Museum Desert Storate, Air Force Flight Test Center Museum, Edwards AFB, California.
- 52-5761 – New England Air Museum, Bradley International Airport, Connecticut.
- 52-5762 – Grand Haven Memorial Airpark, Grand Haven, Michigan.
- 52-5770 – Travis AFB Heritage Center, Vacaville, California
- 52-5773 – Commemorative Air Force Headquarters, Midland, Texas.
- 52-5777 – Hill Aerospace Museum, Hill AFB, Utah.
- 53-1532 – 150th Special Operations Wing, New Mexico Air National Guard area, Kirtland AFB, Albuquerque, New Mexico.
- 53-1533 – Baxter Memorial Park, Melrose, New Mexico.
- 53-1553 – South Dakota Air and Space Museum, Rapid City, South Dakota.
- 53-1559 – 178th Fighter Wing / Springfield-Beckley Municipal Airport, Springfield, Ohio.
- 53-1573 – Seymour Johnson AFB, North Carolina.
- 53-1578 – 140th Fighter Wing / Colorado Air National Guard compound, Buckley Space Force Base, Aurora, Colorado.
- 53-1600 – Tucumcari Historical Museum, Tucumcari, New Mexico.
- 53-1629 – Ebing Air National Guard Base – 188th Fighter Wing, Fort Smith, Arkansas.
- 53-1684 – Historic Aviation Memorial Museum, Tyler, Texas.
- 53-1688 – stored for Raytheon at the Mojave Airport, Mojave, California.

===== F-100C =====
- 53-1709 (painted as F-100D 55–2879) – Castle Air Museum (former Castle AFB), Atwater, California
- 53-1712 – Grissom Air Museum, Grissom ARB (former Grissom AFB), Peru, Indiana.
- 53-1716 – Luke Air Force Base Air Park, Luke AFB, Phoenix, Arizona.
- 54-1748 – Holt Heritage Airpark, Mountain Home AFB, Boise, Idaho.
- 54-1752 – Dyess Linear Air Park, Dyess AFB, Texas.
- 54-1753 – Southern Museum of Flight, Birmingham, Alabama.
- 54-1784 – Prairie Aviation Museum, Bloomington, Illinois. Formerly at Octave Chanute Aerospace Museum, former Chanute AFB, Rantoul, Illinois.
- 54-1785 – Yankee Air Museum, Belleville, Michigan
- 54-1786 – March Field Air Museum, March ARB (former March AFB), Riverside, California.
- 54-1823 – Pima Air & Space Museum (adjacent to Davis-Monthan AFB), Tucson, Arizona.
- 54-1986 (painted as F-100C 54-1954 as flown by former northwest Florida resident and Medal of Honor recipient, Colonel George Bud Day, USAF Ret Dec) – Air Force Armament Museum, Eglin AFB, Florida.
- 54-1993 – Freedom Historical Air Park, McConnell AFB, Wichita, Kansas.
- 54-2005 – 185th Air Refueling Wing / Sioux City Air National Guard Base, Sioux Gateway Airport, Sioux City, Iowa.
- 54-2091 – Yanks Air Museum, Chino, California.
- 54-2106 – Volk Field Air National Guard Base, Wisconsin.

===== F-100D =====
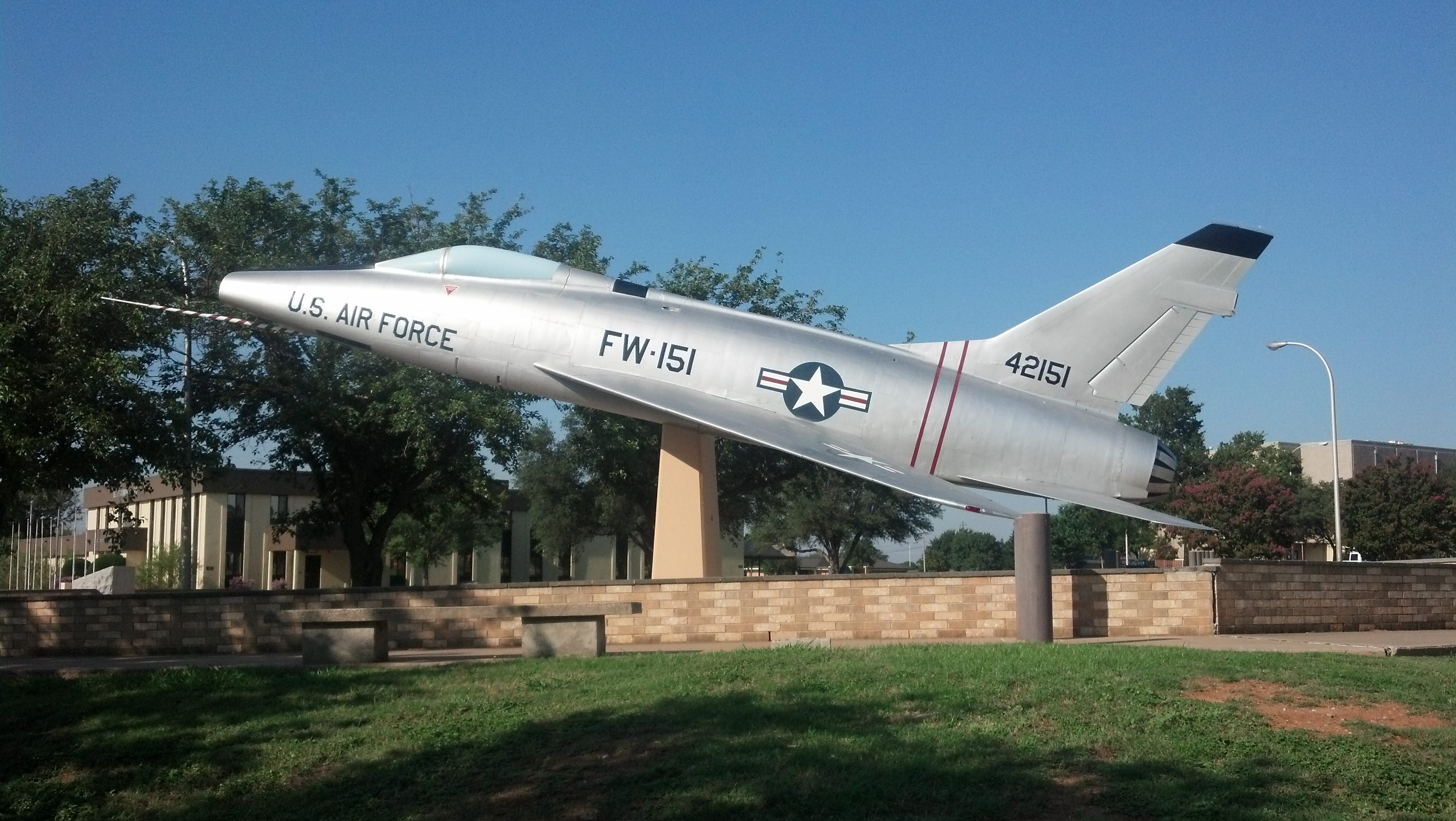
- F-100D on display at Sheppard AFB.
  54-2145 – Air Power Park near Langley AFB in Hampton, Virginia.
- 54-2151 – Sheppard AFB Air Park, Sheppard AFB, Texas.
- 54-2281 – Harry Bonsall Park, Glendale, Arizona.
- 54-2299 – Joe Davies Heritage Airpark, Air Force Plant 42, Palmdale, California
- 55-2855 – Toledo ANGB, Toledo Express Airport, Toledo, Ohio.
- 55-2884 – 121st Air Refueling Wing / Rickenbacker ANGB, Columbus, Ohio.
- 55-3503 – Pueblo Weisbrod Aircraft Museum, Pueblo, Colorado.
- 55-3595 – Nellis AFB, Nevada.
- 55-3650 – 180th Fighter Wing / Toledo Air National Guard Base, Swanton, Ohio.
- 55-3667 – Missouri Air National Guard / Whiteman Air Force Base, Knob Noster, Missouri.
- 55-3678 – Maxwell AFB Air Park, Maxwell AFB, Alabama.
- 55-3754 – National Museum of the United States Air Force, Wright-Patterson AFB, Ohio.
- 55-3805 – Connecticut ANGB – 103d Airlift Wing area, Windsor Locks, Connecticut.
- 56-2928 – Dobbins ARB, Marietta, Georgia.
- 56-2940 – Cannon AFB, New Mexico.* 56-2967 – Warbird Park, Myrtle Beach International Airport (former Myrtle Beach AFB), South Carolina.
- 56-2993 – New York ANGB – 107th Airlift Wing area, Niagara Falls, New York.
- 56-2995 – Massachusetts ANGB – 102nd Intelligence Wing compound, Otis ANGB, Falmouth, Massachusetts.
- 56-3000 – Lackland AFB / Kelly Field Annex (former Kelly AFB) – 149th Fighter Wing area, San Antonio, Texas.
- 56-3008 – Massachusetts ANGB – 104th Fighter Wing complex, Westfield, Massachusetts.
- 56-3020 – Museum Airpark at Jackson Barracks Louisiana National Guard base, New Orleans, Louisiana
- 56-3022 – Mansfield Lahm ANGB – 179th Airlift Wing area, Mansfield, Ohio.
- 56-3025 – Selfridge Military Air Museum, Mount Clemens, Michigan.
- 56-3046 – Randall County Veterans Park, Amarillo, Texas.
- 56-3055 – Tucson Air National Guard Base – 162nd Fighter Wing complex, Tucson, Arizona.
- 56-3081 – MAPS Air Museum, Akron/Canton Airport Ohio.
- 56-3141 – Planes of Fame, Chino, California.
- 56-3154 – Lone Star Flight Museum, Houston, Texas.
- 56-3187 – Sioux Falls ANGB – 114th FG, Sioux Falls, South Dakota.

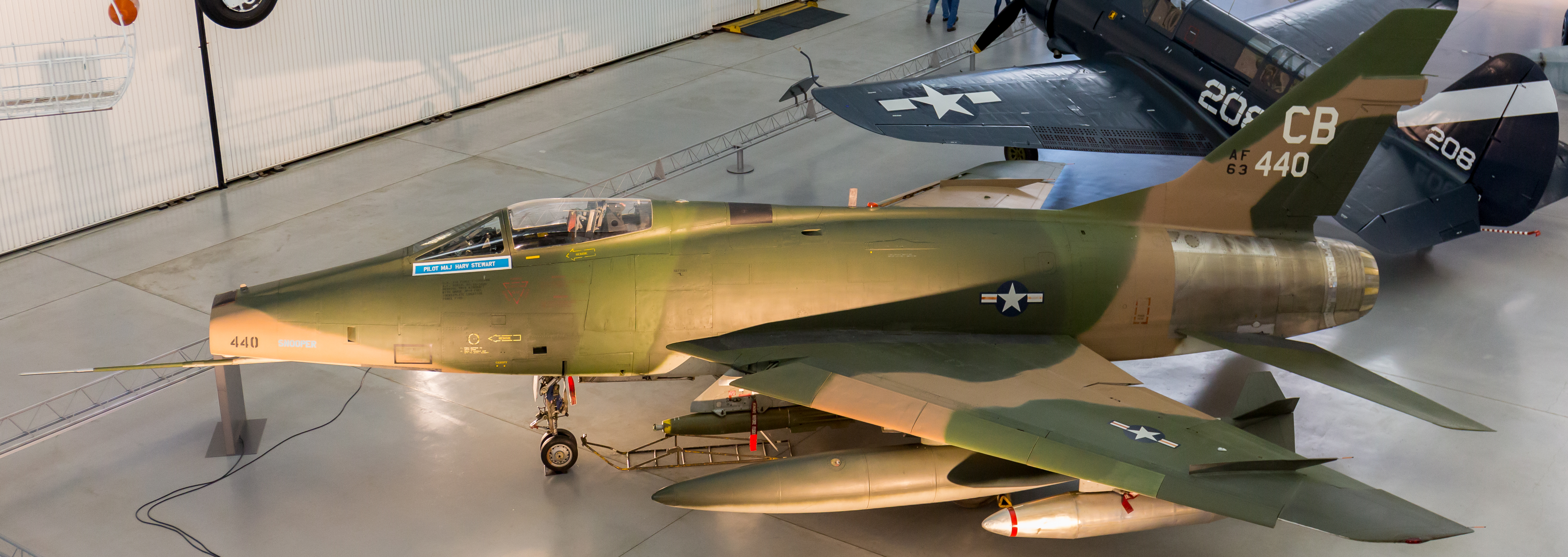
An F-100D Super Sabre at the Udvar-Hazy Center.

- 56-3208 – Fessenden, North Dakota.
- 56-3220 – Holloman AFB, New Mexico.
- 56-3288 – Aerospace Museum of California, Sacramento, California.
- 56-3299 – Buckley Space Force Base – 140th Fighter Wing area, Aurora, Colorado.
- 56-3320 – Terre Haute ANGB – 181st Intelligence Wing area, Terre Haute, Indiana.

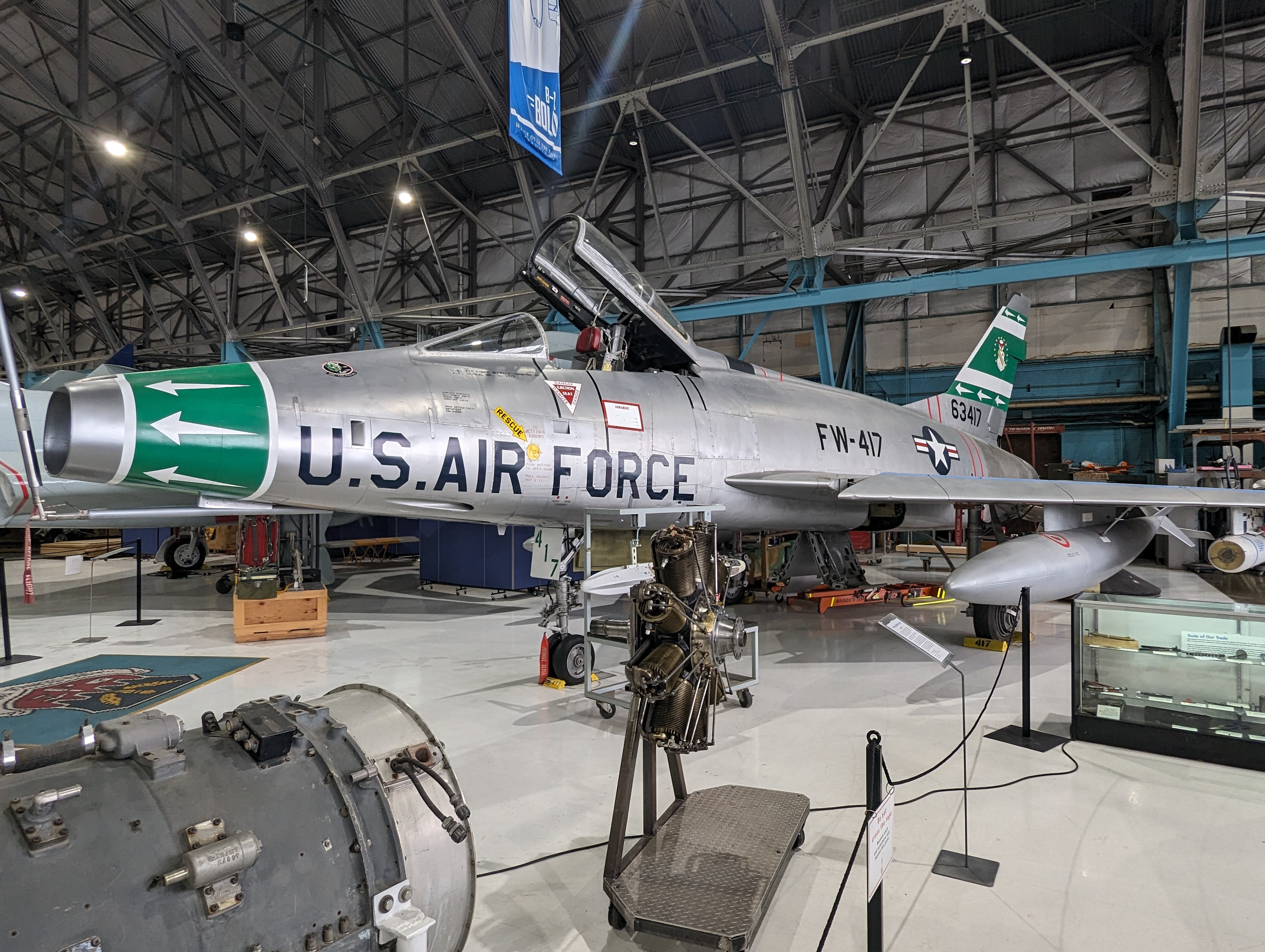
F-100D at Wings Over the Rockies Air and Space Museum

- 56-3417 – Wings Over the Rockies Air and Space Museum (former Lowry AFB), Denver, Colorado.
- 56-3426 – Des Moines ANGB – 132nd Fighter Wing area, Des Moines, Iowa.
- 56-3434 – Previously at Arkansas National Guard HQ, Little Rock, Arkansas. relocated to Valiant Air Command Warbird Museum, Space Coast Regional Airport, Titusville, Florida in 2015 for restoration.
- 56-3440 – Steven F. Udvar-Hazy Center, Fairfax County, Virginia.

===== F-100F =====
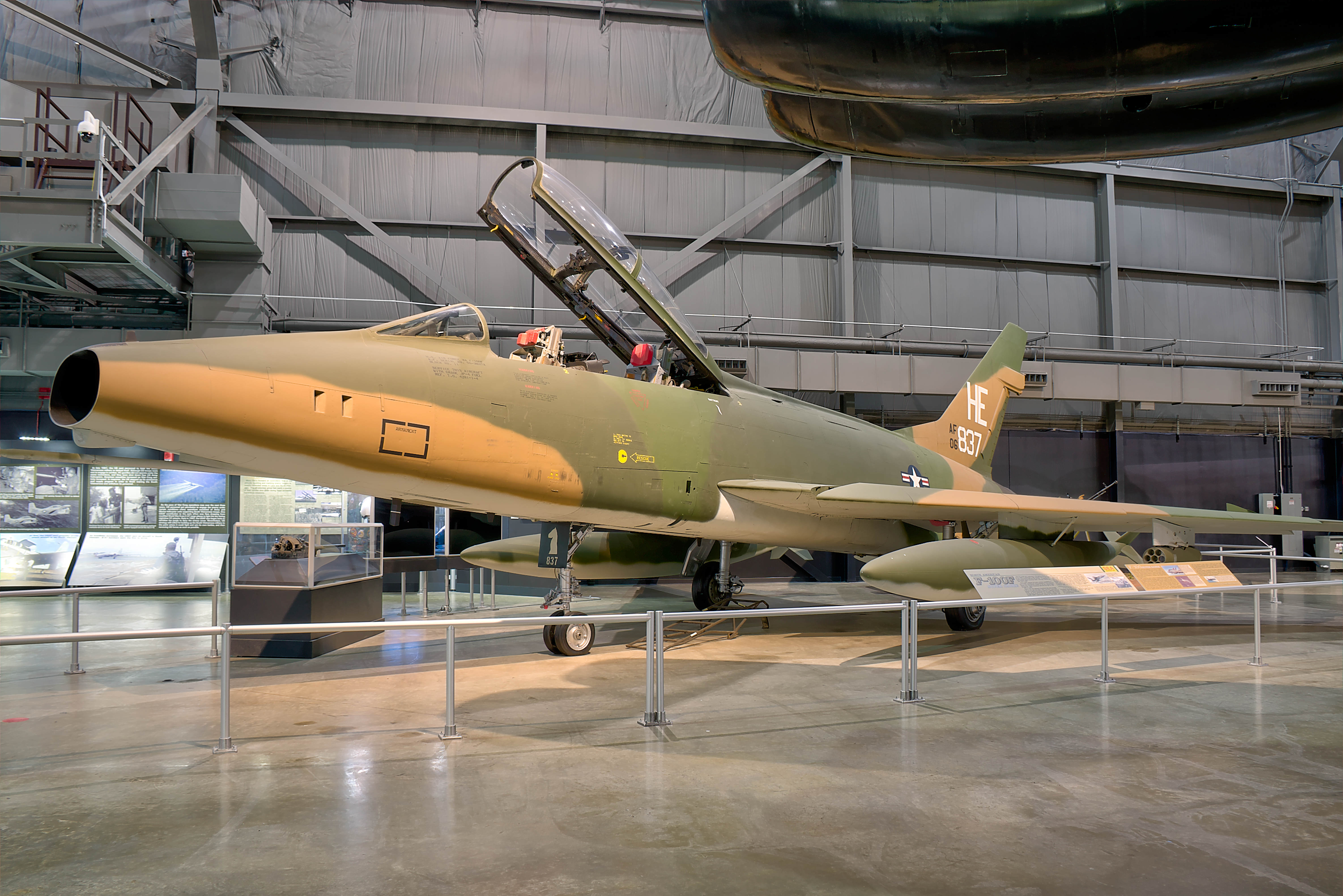
F-100F at the USAF Museum

- 56-3727 – Warrior Park, Davis-Monthan AFB, Arizona.
- 56-3730 – USAF Academy, Colorado.
- 56-3812 – Veterans Park, Duncan, Arizona.
- 56-3813 – Riverside Park, Independence, Kansas.
- 56-3814 – Bay Street Park, Texas City, Texas.
- 56-3819 – Saint Maries Municipal Airport, Saint Maries, Idaho.
- 56-3822 – Clay County Veterans Memorial Park, Lineville, Alabama.
- 56-3825 – Aurora Municipal Airport, Aurora, Nebraska.
- 56-3832 – Evergreen Aviation and Space Museum, McMinnville, Oregon.
- 56-3837 – National Museum of the United States Air Force, Wright-Patterson AFB, Ohio.
- 56-3855 – Las Cruces Municipal Airport, Las Cruces, New Mexico.
- 56-3897 – Atlantic City ANGB – 177th Fighter Wing complex, Atlantic City, New Jersey.
- 56-3894 – Selfridge Military Air Museum, Selfridge Air National Guard Base, Mount Clemens, Michigan.
- 56-3899 – Glenn L. Martin Aviation Museum, Middle River, Maryland.
- 56-3904 – Aviation Cadet Museum, Silver Wings Field, Eureka Springs, Arkansas.
- 56-3905 – Glenn L. Martin Aviation Museum, Middle River, Maryland.
- 56-3929 – Fayette Regional Air Center Airport, La Grange, Texas.
- 56-3982 – Hangar 25 Air Museum, Big Spring, Texas.
- 56-3990 – Commemorative Air Force – Highland Lakes Squadron, Burnet, Texas.
- 58-1232 – Museum of Aviation, Robins AFB, Warner Robins, Georgia (relocated from the now-closed Brooks AFB, TX)

== Specifications (F-100D) ==
3-view line drawing of the North American F-100 Super Sabre

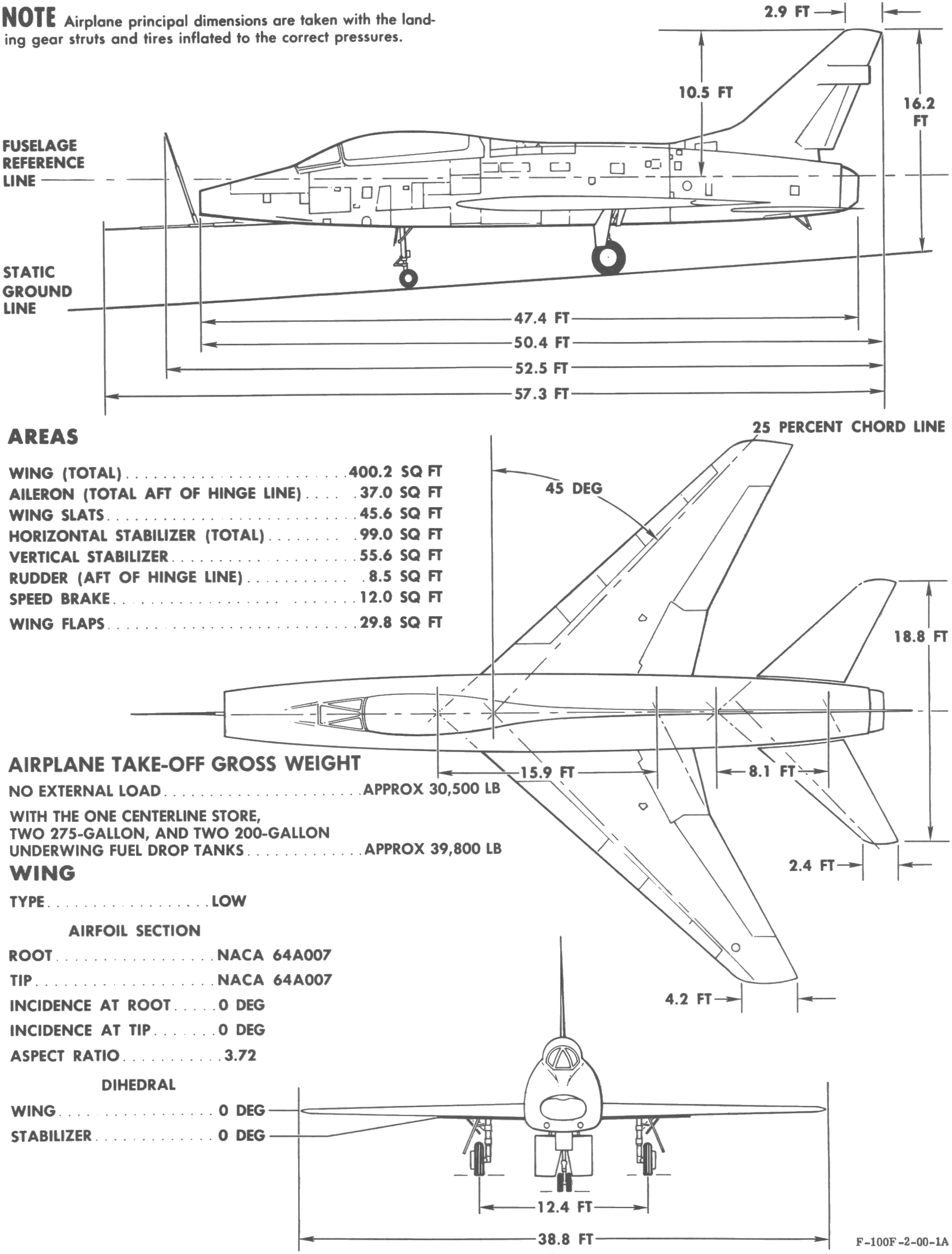
3-view line drawing of the North American F-100F Super Sabre

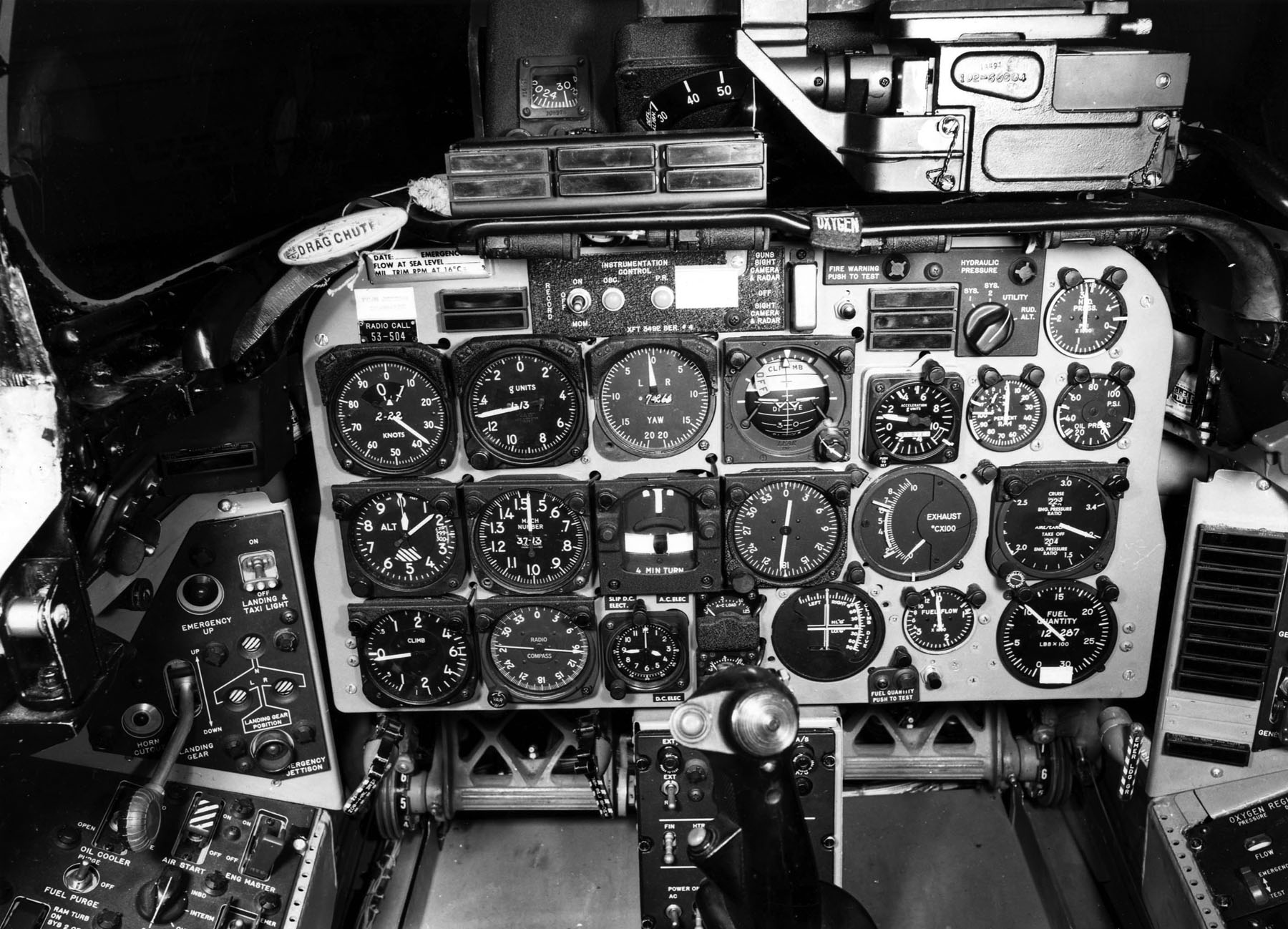
D-model cockpit, instrument panel

Data from Quest for Performance, Encyclopedia of US Air Force Aircraft and Missile Systems

General characteristics

- Crew: 1
- Length: 50 ft (15 m)
- Wingspan: 38 ft 9 in (11.81 m)
- Height: 16 ft 2.75 in (4.9467 m)
- Wing area: 400 sq ft (37 m^{2})
- Aspect ratio: 3.76
- Airfoil: NACA 64A007
- Zero-lift drag coefficient: C_{D}0.0130
- Drag area: 5.0 sq ft (0.46 m^{2})
- Empty weight: 21,000 lb (9,525 kg)
- Gross weight: 28,847 lb (13,085 kg)
- Max takeoff weight: 34,832 lb (15,800 kg)
- Powerplant: 1 × Pratt & Whitney J57-P-21/21A afterburning turbojet engine, 10,200 lbf (45 kN) thrust dry, 16,000 lbf (71 kN) with afterburner

Performance

- Maximum speed: 924 mph (1,487 km/h, 803 kn)
- Maximum speed: Mach 1.4
- Range: 1,995 mi (3,211 km, 1,734 nmi)
- Service ceiling: 50,000 ft (15,000 m)
- Rate of climb: 22,400 ft/min (114 m/s)
- Lift-to-drag: 13.9
- Wing loading: 72.1 lb/sq ft (352 kg/m^{2})
- Thrust/weight: 0.55

Armament

- Guns: 4× 20 mm (0.787 in) M39A1 revolver cannon each with 200 rounds per gun
- Hardpoints: 6 with a capacity of 7,040 lb (3,190 kg), with provisions to carry combinations of:
  - Missiles: ** 4× AIM-9 Sidewinder or
  - 2× AGM-12 Bullpup or
  - 2× or 4× LAU-3/A 2.75" (70 mm) unguided rocket dispenser
  - Bombs: Conventional bombs or Mark 7, Mk 28, Mk 38, or Mk 43 nuclear bombs

Avionics

- Minneapolis-Honeywell MB-3 automatic pilot
- AN/AJB-1B – Low-altitude bombing system
- AN/ALQ-87 – ECM pod
- AN/APG-25 – Tail gun tracking radar
- AN/APG-30 – Fire-control radar
- AN/APR-25 – Radar Homing and Warning (RHAW) system
- AN/APR-26 – Rearward radar warning
- AN/ARC-34 – UHF radio

== See also ==
- Flight airspeed record
- 1959 Kadena Air Base F-100 crash

Related development

- North American F-86 Sabre
- North American FJ-4 Fury
- North American F-107

Aircraft of comparable role, configuration, and era

- Dassault Super Mystère
- Dassault Étendard IV
- Mikoyan-Gurevich MiG-19
- Vought F-8 Crusader

Related lists

- List of military aircraft of the United States
- List of fighter aircraft
