= List of United States Air Force museums =

The United States Air Force maintains a number of Field Museums and Heritage Centers.

== Background ==
The Air Force History and Museums Program oversees all heritage activities of the United States Air Force. In addition to the National Museum of the United States Air Force, there are four types of heritage activities: field museums, heritage centers, historical holdings and airparks.

Previously known as the Office of Air Force History, it assumed its current name in 1991.

== Current museums ==
- National Museum of the United States Air Force – Wright-Patterson Air Force Base, Dayton, Ohio
- Air Force Armament Museum – Eglin AFB, near Valparaiso, Florida
- Air Force Cyberspace and Communications Heritage Center – Scott AFB, near Shiloh, Illinois
- Air Force Flight Test Center Museum – Edwards AFB, near North Edwards and Rosamond, California
- Air Mobility Command Museum – Dover AFB, near Dover, Delaware
- Barksdale Global Power Museum – Barksdale AFB, near Bossier City, Louisiana
- Enlisted Heritage Research Institute – Maxwell AFB, Alabama
- Hill Aerospace Museum – northwest of Hill AFB, near Ogden, Utah
- Malmstrom Museum – Malmstrom AFB, Montana
- McChord Air Museum – McChord AFB, near Tacoma, Washington
- Museum of Aviation – near Robins AFB, Warner Robins, Georgia
- Peterson Air and Space Museum – Peterson AFB, Colorado Springs, Colorado
- Sheppard AFB Heritage Center – Sheppard AFB, Texas
- South Dakota Air and Space Museum – Ellsworth AFB, in Box Elder, South Dakota
- Thunderbirds Museum – Nellis AFB, near Las Vegas, Nevada
- Travis Air Force Base Aviation Museum – Travis AFB, near Fairfield, California
- USAF Airman Heritage Museum – Lackland AFB, near San Antonio, Texas
- Warren ICBM and Heritage Museum – F.E. Warren AFB, near Cheyenne, Wyoming

== Closed museums ==
- 509th Bomb Wing Museum, Whiteman Air Force Base, Knob Noster, Missouri
- Air Force Rescue Memorial Museum – Kirtland Air Force Base, Albuquerque, New Mexico (closed January 1990)
- Beale Air Force Base Museum – Beale Air Force Base, east of Marysville, California (closed in February 1995)
- Davis-Monthan Air Force Base Museum – Davis-Monthan Air Force Base, Tucson, Arizona (closed 1949)
- Dyess Air Force Base Museum – Dyess Air Force Base, Abilene, Texas (now exists as Dyess Linear Air Park)
- Edward H. White II Museum of Aerospace Medicine – Brooks City-Base, San Antonio, Texas (closed in 2011)
- Fairchild Heritage Museum – Fairchild Air Force Base, Spokane, Washington (closed 2002) (Note: Museum collection granted to the Armed Forces and Aerospace Museum Society by an act of congress in 2002.)
- Grand Forks Air Force Base Museum – Grand Forks Air Force Base, Emerado, North Dakota
- Lowry Heritage Museum – Lowry Air Force Base, Denver, Colorado (Note: The Wings Over the Rockies Air and Space Museum was developed to replace the museum when it closed.)
- Minot Air Force Base Museum – Minot Air Force Base, near Minot, North Dakota
- Plattsburgh Air Force Base Museum – Plattsburgh Air Force Base, Plattsburgh, New York (closed in 1995)
- Randolph Air Force Base Museum – Randolph Air Force Base, Universal City, Texas (consolidated with Lackland museum in 1958)
- Silver Wings Aviation Museum – Mather Air Force Base, near Sacramento, California
- USAF Security Forces Museum – Lackland AFB, next to San Antonio, Texas (closed in August 2014 to became part of USAF Airman Heritage Museum)

== Former museums ==
These museums were once part of the Air Force museum system, but have since become private:

- Castle Air Museum
- Grissom Air Museum
- March Field Air Museum
- McClellan Aviation Museum
- Minnesota Air National Guard Museum
- Selfridge Military Air Museum
- Strategic Aerospace Museum

This museum was once part of the Air Force museum system, but was renamed and transferred to the Space Force when it became an independent branch:

- Air Force Space and Missile Museum

== See also ==
- National Museum of the Mighty Eighth Air Force
- Octave Chanute Aerospace Museum (Note: Established after the closure of the base.)
- Pima Air & Space Museum
