= PA3 =

PA3 may refer to:

- ALCO PA-3, a diesel locomotive
- Paranormal Activity 3, a 2011 American horror film
- Pennsylvania Route 3
- Pennsylvania's 3rd congressional district
- Pitcairn PA-3 Orowing, a biplane
- The PA3, a type of rolling stock used on the PATH train in New York and New Jersey
- PA3 key, on the IBM 3270 keyboard
