= USAF Airman Heritage Museum =

Military and aviation museum in Texas, US

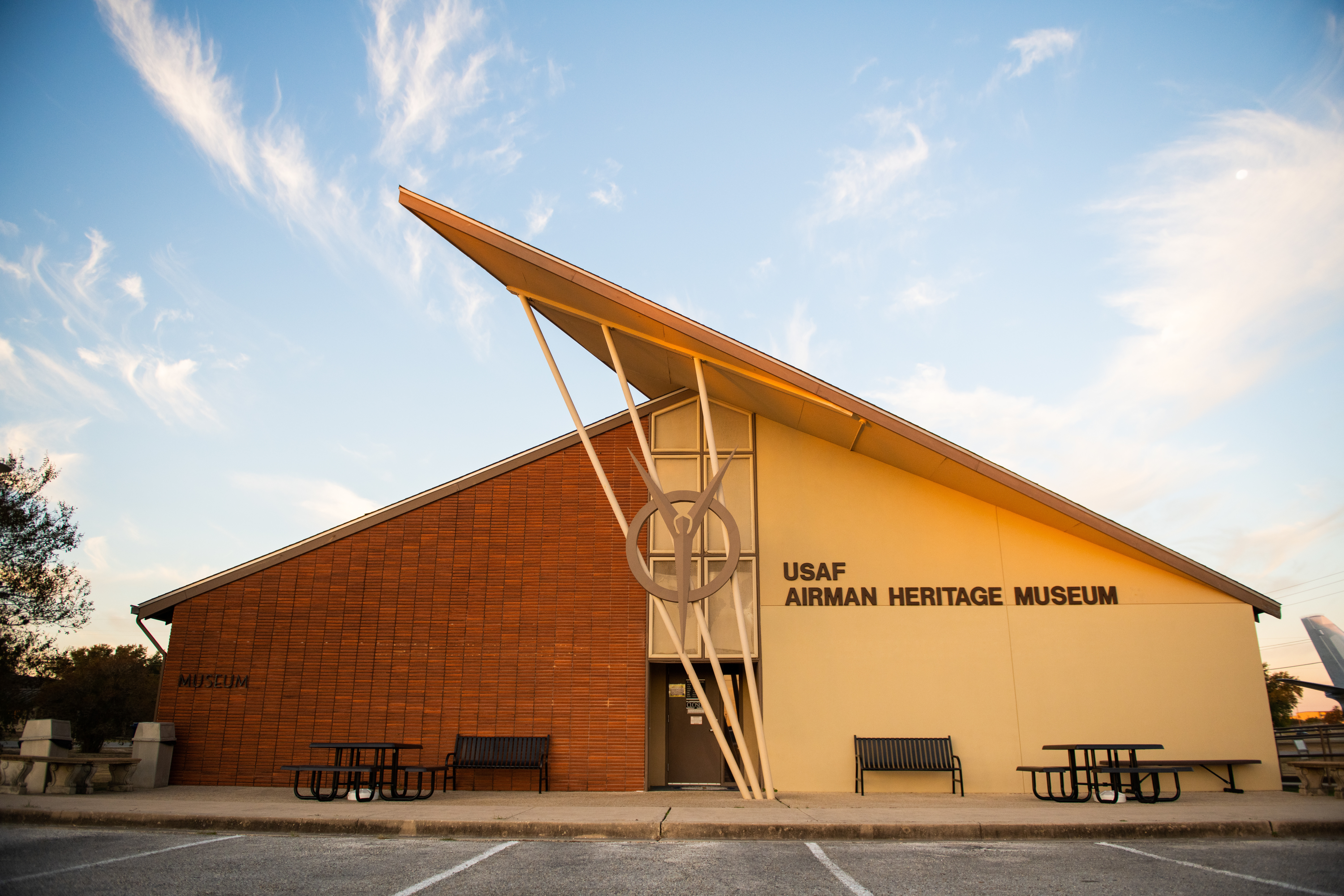
- Former name: History and Traditions Museum
- Established: 1956
- Location: Lackland Air Force Base; San Antonio, Texas
- Coordinates: 29.3840019°N 98.621705°W
- Type: Military aviation museum
- Collection size: 40+ aircraft 35 exhibits 4,000+ artifacts
- Visitors: 36,000 (2019)
- Director: Bill Manchester
- Curator: Fernando Cortez
- Historian: Stephanie Ritter
- Nearest parking: On base (no charge)
- Website: myairmanmuseum.org

The USAF Airman Heritage Museum is an aviation field museum and heritage collection of the United States Air Force located at Lackland AFB near San Antonio, Texas. The museum, along with the Security Forces Exhibit Annex, are part of the Airman Heritage Training Complex, run by the Air Education and Training Command. Its mission is to preserve and honor the history and heritage of enlisted airmen.

== History ==
The museum opened as the History and Traditions Museum in 1956 as one of 12 satellite museums to the National Museum of the United States Air Force. Museum construction began in 1956 inside a building that dates to 1942, and it opened to the public in February 1957. With the stated purpose of giving basic trainees "pride in the past", museum staff arranged exhibits in coordination with Wright-Patterson Air Force Base. They refurbished aircraft on static display to pay tribute to the planes' respective squadrons, crew, and pilots, ensuring correct paint and insignias.

On March 5, 1958 the Air Force announced the consolidation of museums at Randolph and Lackland Air Force Bases into the one at Lackland.

The History and Traditions Museum annual attendance was over 100,000 in the 1970s. The museum had over 50 aircraft and missiles, a reference library, and miniatures recreating WWII air battles. The engine exhibit contained a Liberty L-6 and L-12 and an Allison V-12 among others.

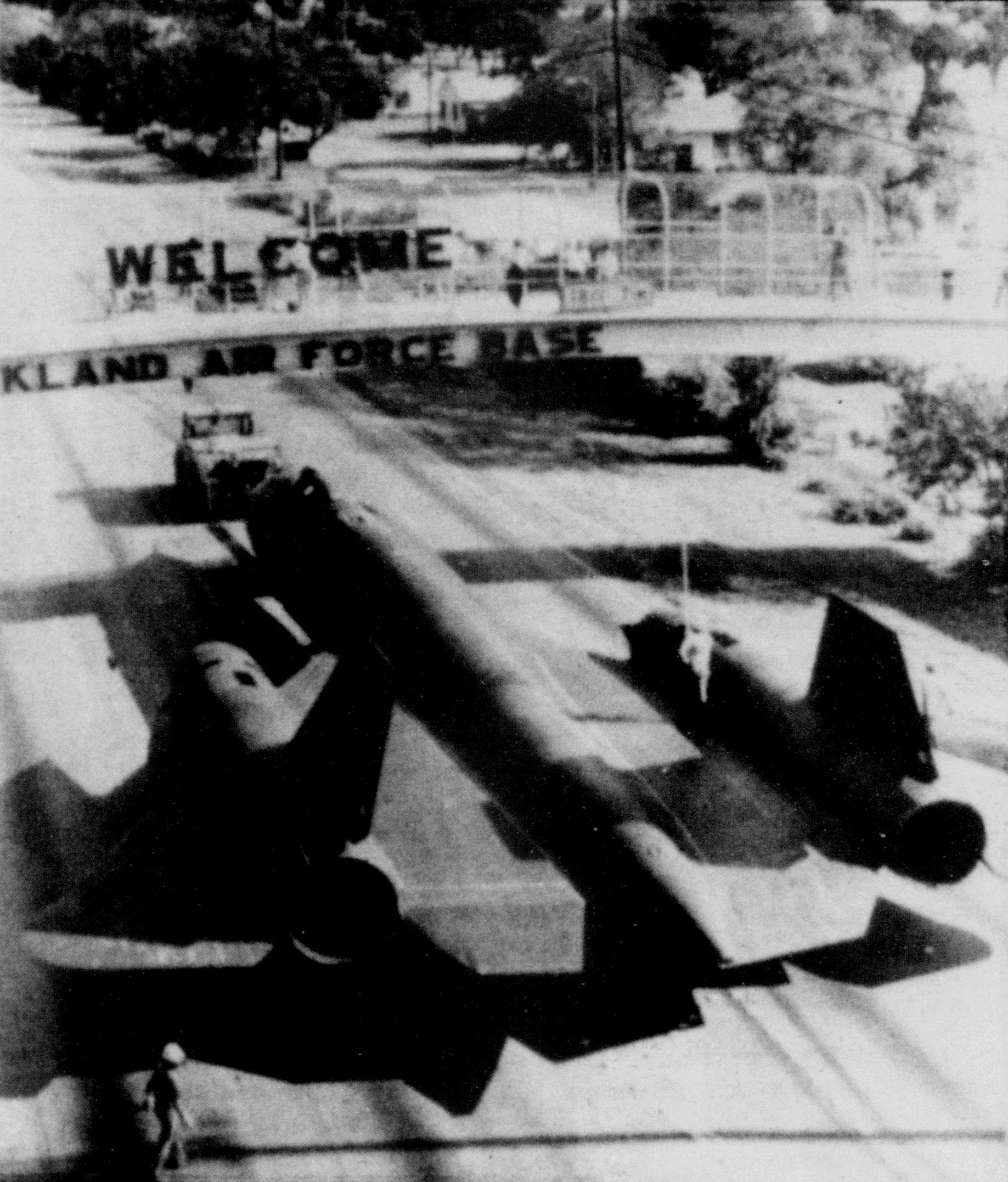
SR-71 "Blackbird" towed from Kelly AFB to Lackland AFB, June 3, 1990

The SR-71A "Blackbird" was put on static display in 1990 at the Parade Ground Airpark. Its final flight was on March 6, 1990, landing at Kelly AFB after two flybys.

In 2010 the museum reopened with a new name—the Airman Heritage Museum. The same year, Building 6351, a 1940s era barracks was moved to the museum.

On February 11, 2013 the Lackland Gateway Heritage Foundation signed a memorandum of understanding with the USAF to build a new museum. Its goal was to raise money for the new building, targeting a fall 2017 opening. The new museum would be located on a 85,000 sq ft (7,900 m^{2}) site north of the parade grounds. It would have 50,000 sq ft (4,600 m^{2}) of exhibit space and be privately funded with $50 million by the Airman Heritage Foundation.

In 2014 the Airman Heritage Museum and Security Forces Exhibit Annex were brought together under a single entity, the Airman Heritage Training Complex, itself operated by the Air Education and Training Command.

The museum recognized members of the Tuskegee Airmen and their families at opening of their exhibit on May 4, 2015. The research for the exhibit had begun in 2014 at the Air Force Historical Research Agency.

The Airman Heritage Foundation continued to raise funds in 2019 for new building set to open in 2022. It is planned to be more accessible, with the entrance outside the base.

In 2019 the Airman Heritage Museum had 36,000 visitors and the Security Forces Exhibit Annex had 23,000 visitors.

In 2020, nine static aircraft of the Southeast Asia Airpark were moved to make room for construction of new Airman Training Complexes. Aircraft moved to the Parade Ground Airpark included the B-52, F-4, F-5, F-100, B-57, B-66, and F-105. The T-37 and UH-1 were moved to the Inter-American Air Force Academy. The Airman Heritage Training Complex provided technical support for the move.

== Collections ==
=== Airman Heritage Museum ===
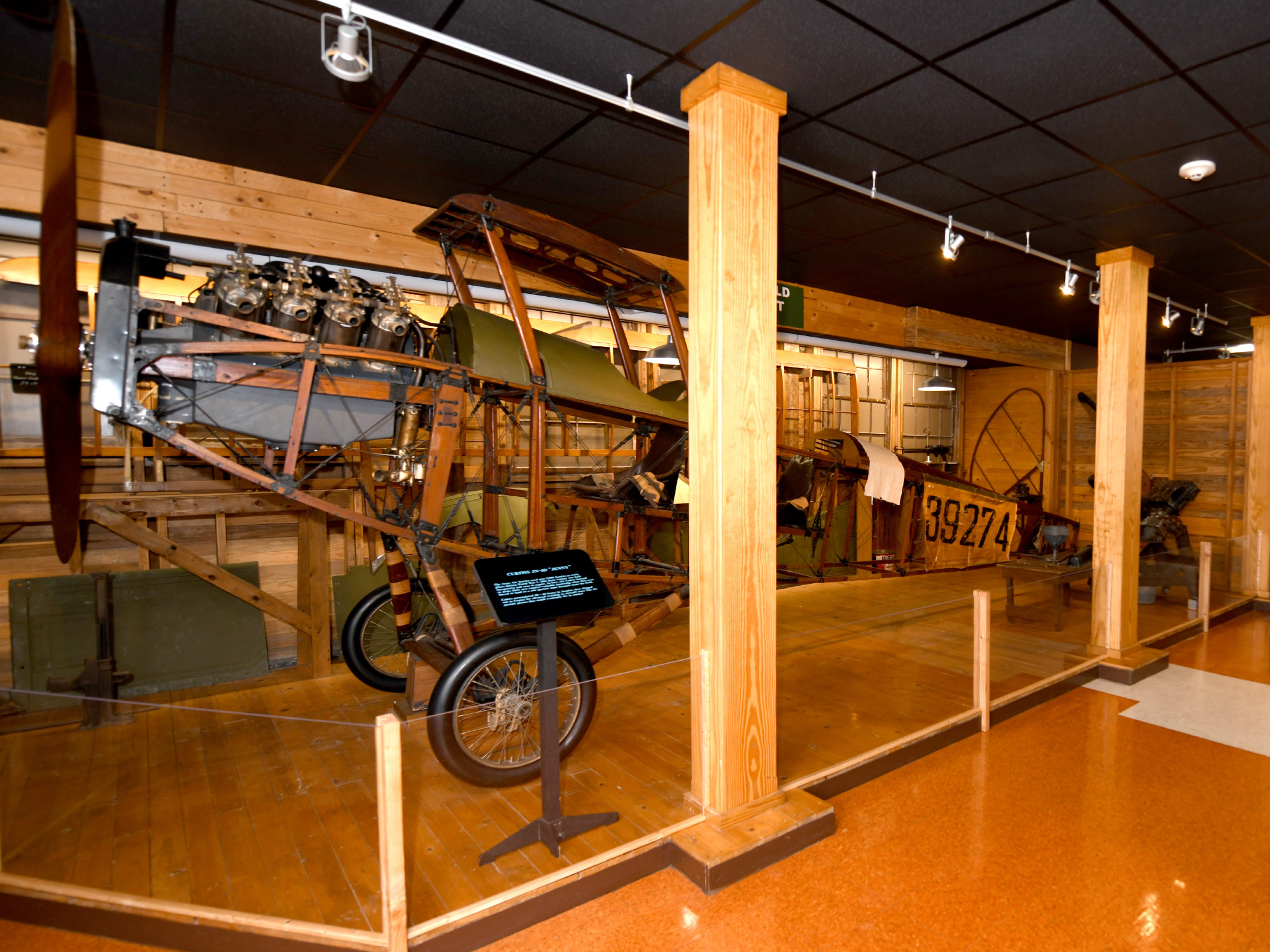
Curtiss JN-4 "Jenny" biplane exhibit

The current indoor space is 6,778 sq ft (630 m^{2}) with 5,000 sq ft (460 m^{2}) of exhibit space. The museum has over 4,000 artifacts from 1907 to present, which are on loan from the National Museum of the U.S. Air Force. A total of 35 exhibits are on display, including scale models of planes, a B-24 bomber simulator, the Tuskegee Airmen exhibit, an original Curtiss JN-4 “Jenny” biplane fuselage skeleton with OX-5 engine, an exhibit on the precursor to the Air Force, the Aeronautical Division, U.S. Signal Corps, a display on the Women's Air Force, and more.

The Airman Heritage Museum has over 40 aircraft on static display outdoors, most of which are located Parade Ground Airpark. The aircraft represent Army Air Corps and Air Force history spanning eight decades.

==== Aircraft ====
- Beechcraft SNB-2 29637
- Beechcraft T-34A Mentor 55-0206
- Bell RP-63G Kingcobra 45-57295
- Bell UH-1B Iroquois 60-3601 (Note: added March 1980)
- Boeing B-17G Flying Fortress 44-83512
- Boeing B-29A Superfortress 44-62220
- Boeing B-52D Stratofortress 55-0068 (Note: added 1984)
- Cessna A-37B Dragonfly 67‐14790 (Note: added April 1998)
- Cessna T-37 Tweet
- Convair T-29B Flying Classroom 51-5172
- Douglas B-26C Invader 44-35918
- Douglas WB-66D Destroyer 55-0390 (Note: added June 28, 1976)
- Douglas C-118A Liftmaster 131589, 51-17640
- Douglas C-47B Skytrain 44-76671 (Note: added September 6, 1972)
- Fairchild C-119C Flying Boxcar 51-2567
- Fairchild C-123B Provider 54-0668 (Note: added November 19, 1981)
- Fairchild Republic OA-10A Thunderbolt II 76-0547
- General Dynamics F-16B Fighting Falcon 78-0107
- Lockheed C-121C Constellation 54-0155
- Lockheed F-104D Starfighter 57-1319
- Lockheed P-38 Lightning – replica (Note: replica painted as P-38L 43-78538)
- Lockheed SR-71A Blackbird 61-7979 (Note: added June 4, 1990)
- LTV A-7D Corsair II 71-0337
- Martin B-57A Canberra 52‐1482 (Note: added February 1979)
- McDonnell Douglas C-9A Nightingale 71-0878
- McDonnell Douglas F-15A Eagle 71-0280 (Note: added September 24, 1993)
- McDonnell Douglas F4H-1 Phantom II 149421
- McDonnell F‐101B Voodoo 56‐0241
- North American B-25H Mitchell 43-5103
- North American F-100A Super Sabre 52-5759
- North American P-82E Twin Mustang 46-0262
- North American P-86A Sabre 47-0605 (Note: added February 17, 1979)
- North American P-51H Mustang 44-64376
- North American T-28A Trojan 49-1611
- North American SNJ-4 51584
- Northrop F-5E Tiger II 73‐1630
- Northrop T-38A Talon 59-1605, 63-8123
- Republic F-105D Thunderchief 62-4387 (Note: added October 5, 1985)
- Republic F-84 Thunderstreak 52‐8889 (Note: added April 29, 1970)
- Republic P-47N Thunderbolt 44-89348

=== Security Forces Exhibit Annex Museum ===
The Security Forces Annex contains 47 exhibits and an archival repository pertaining to the history of the Air Force Security Forces since 1947, including the history of military, air, and security police. Special exhibits are on display regarding women in the Security Forces and military working dogs.

== Airman Heritage Foundation ==
The Airman Heritage Foundation is the private non-profit organization that supports and raises funds for the museum. Its mission is to preserve and honor the history and heritage of enlisted airmen.

== See also ==
- List of United States Air Force museums
- List of aviation museums
