= Air Mobility Command Museum =

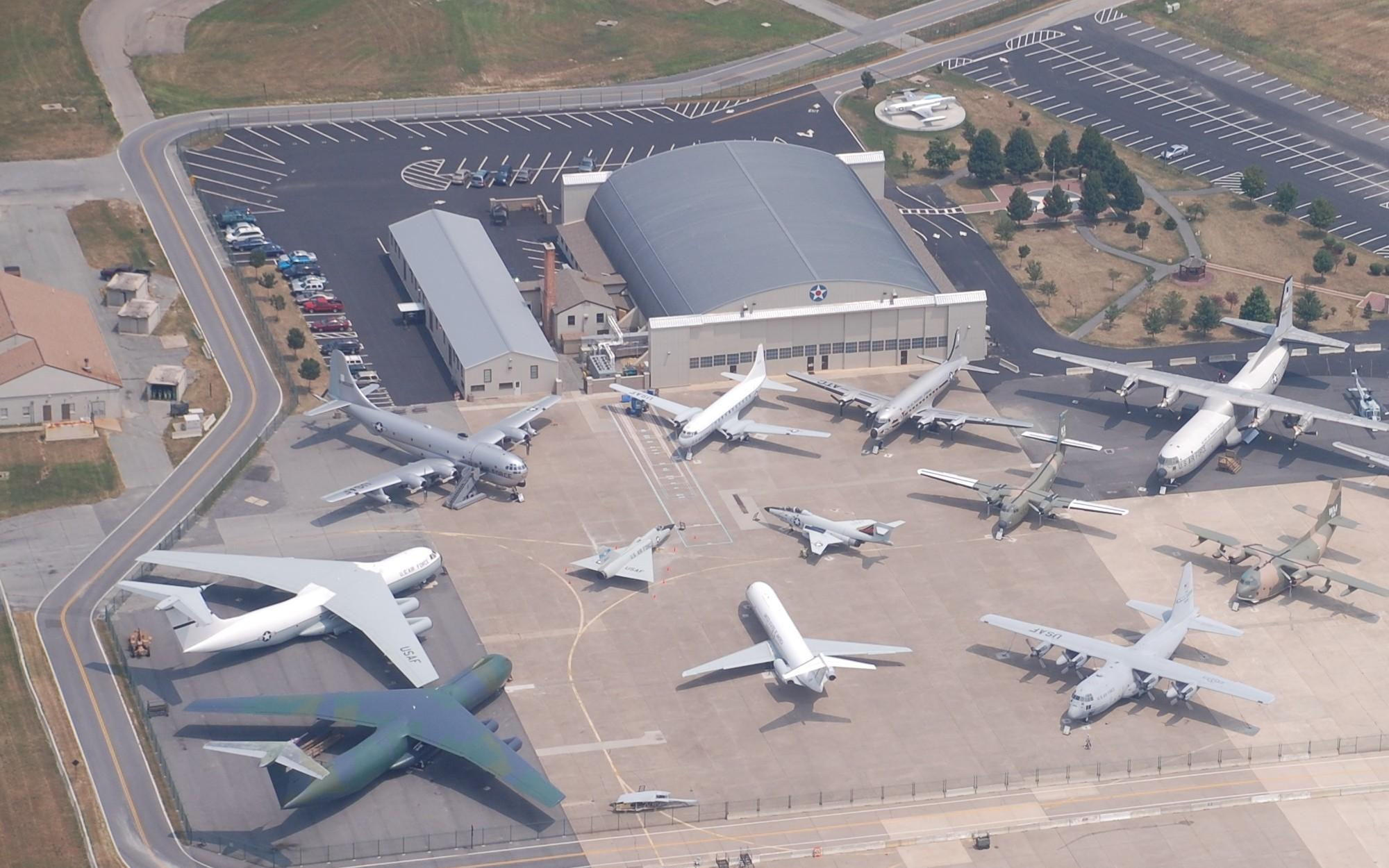
- Aerial view of the museum

- Location in Delaware
- Former name: Dover AFB Historical Center; Dover AFB Museum
- Established: 13 October 1986
- Location: Dover Air Force Base
- Coordinates: 39.118692°N 75.456643°W
- Type: Aviation museum
- Founders: General Walter Kross; Mike Leister
- Director: Johnny Taylor
- Website: amcmuseum.org
- Building 1301
- U.S. National Register of Historic Places
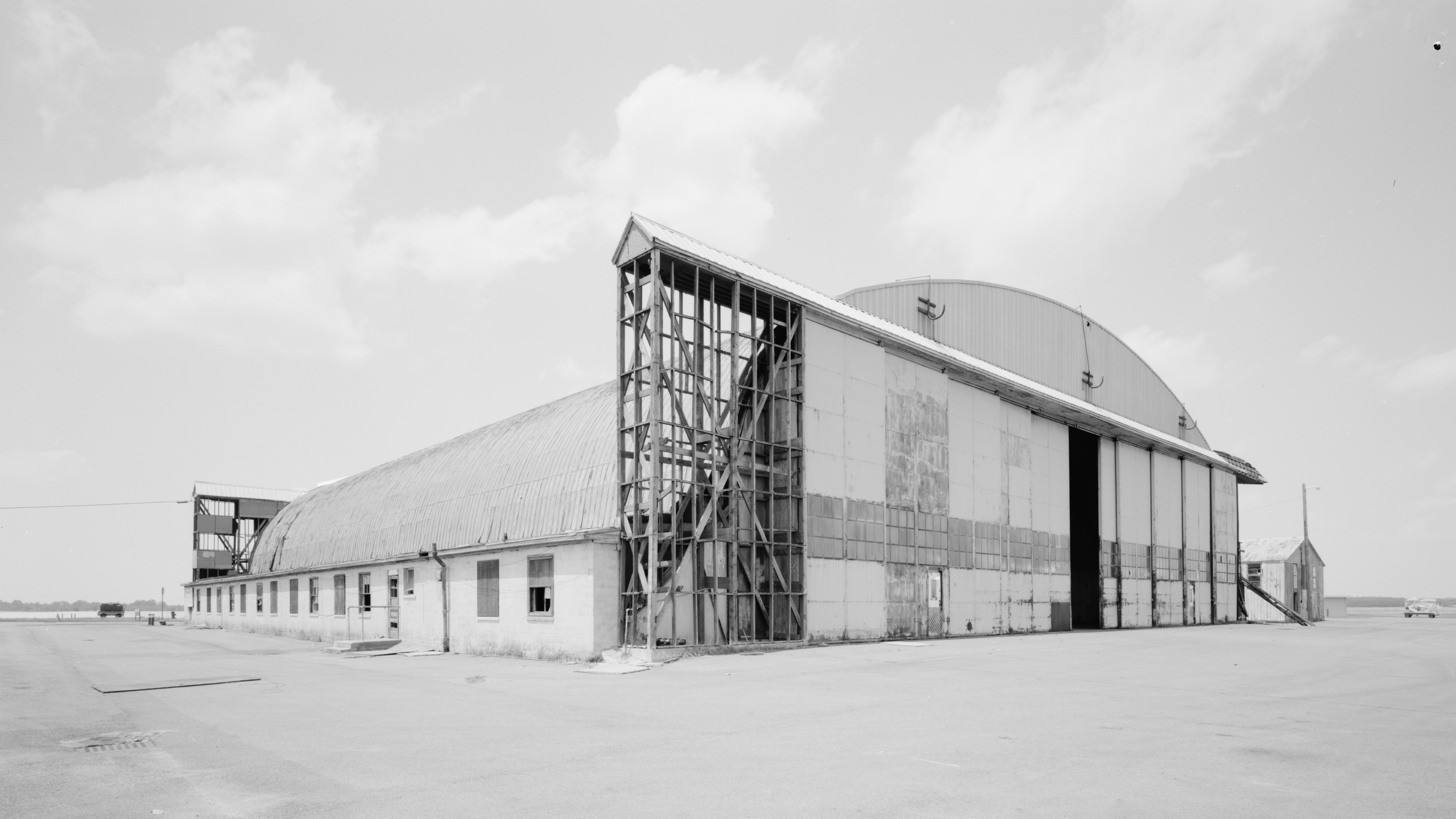
- Historic American Buildings Survey photo
- NRHP reference No.: 94001377
- Added to NRHP: 7 December 1994

The Air Mobility Command Museum is a military aviation museum located at Dover Air Force Base in Dover, Delaware, dedicated to the history of the Air Transport Command, Military Air Transport Service, Military Airlift Command and Air Mobility Command.

== History ==
The origins of the museum lie in an effort that was begun in 1978 by members of the 512th Military Airlift Wing to restore an aircraft as a public relations and maintenance training project. A B-17G, Shoo Shoo Shoo Baby, was selected from a list of potential projects provided by the United States Air Force Museum and it was restored to airworthy condition over a period of ten years. Plans called for the completed airplane to be flown to the USAFM, but a significant desire existed to exhibit the history of Dover Air Force Base. (Note: When the restoration was completed, the museum received a DB-17P in exchange.)

Therefore, at the direction of 436th Military Airlift Wing commander Colonel Walter Kross, planning was begun to establish a permanent historical display. The Dover AFB Historical Center was established on 13 October 1986. Only three days later, a C-47, which had previously been located at Muir Army Airfield in Pennsylvania, was airlifted to the museum.

Following official recognition as a museum by the U.S. Air Force in 1995, it became the Dover AFB Museum. This did not last long, as its name was again changed to Air Mobility Command Museum in February 1997, after it moved from three hangars in the main area of the base to its present location, Hangar 1301, in June 1996. (Note: Hangar 1301 is listed on the National Register of Historic Places for its significance as the site of the US Army Air Force's rocket test center, and was restored in the 1990s.)

An exhibit on the Korean War was opened in 2000.

After being forced to close to the public in 2001, the construction of a new access road allowed the museum to reopen in 2003.

The museum opened a new exhibit about Air Force Mortuary Affairs in September 2023.

== Exhibits ==
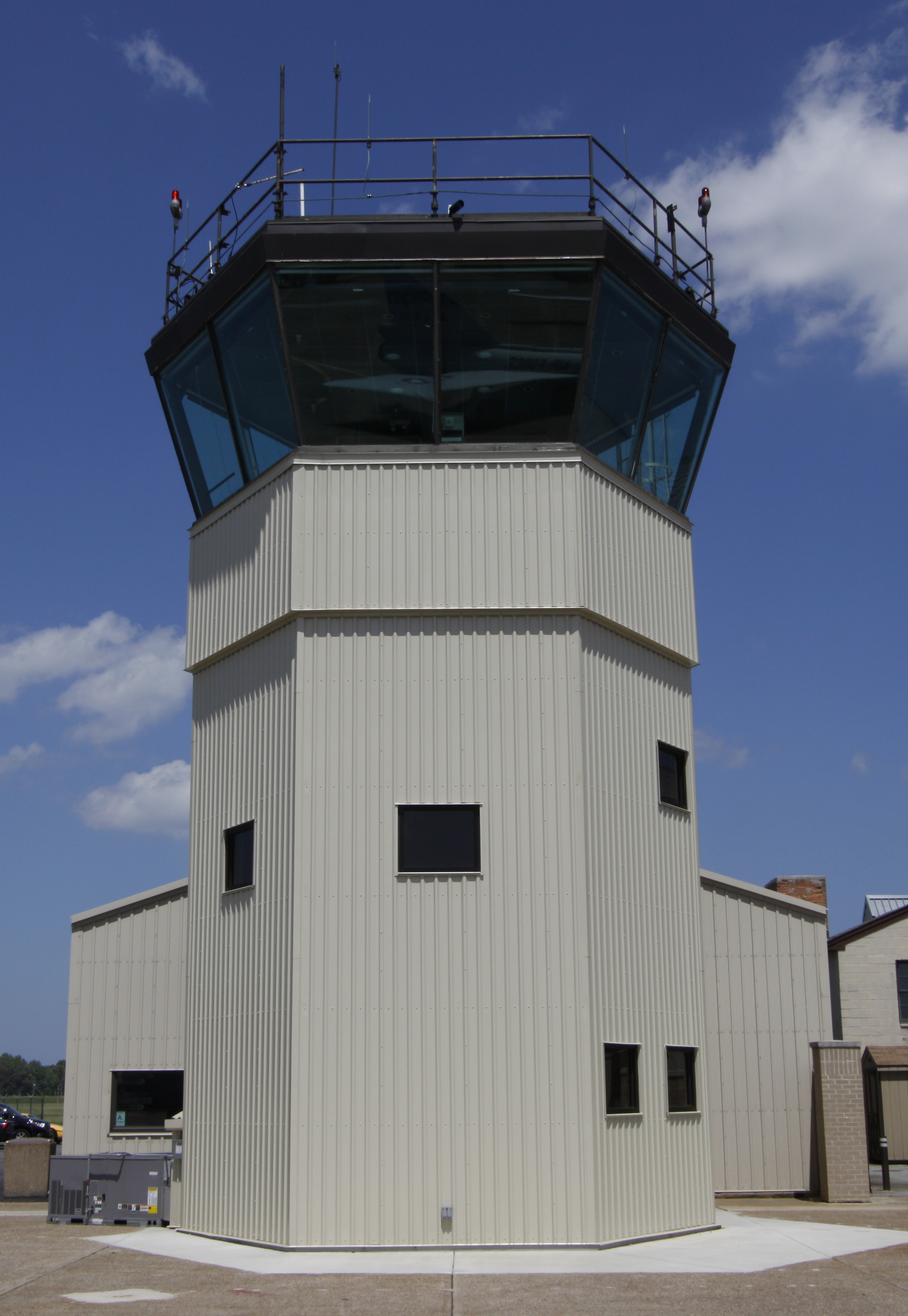
The exhibit air control tower on display at the Air Mobility Command Museum in Dover, Delaware. The tower stood about 103 feet tall when in operation, but currently stands 39 feet high at the museum.

In addition to the aircraft and non-aircraft collections, the museum has a few other notable attractions. These include a flight simulator, commemoration park outside the museum building, and the retired control tower cab, which served as Dover AFB's control tower from 1956 to 2009.

== Collection ==
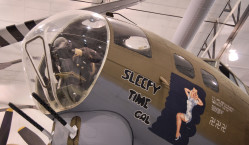
Boeing B-17G Flying Fortress

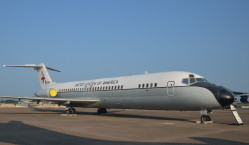
McDonnell Douglas C-9A Nightingale

The Air Mobility Command Museum is home to a number of significant vintage aircraft from a variety of eras and major commands. Additionally, the AMC Museum houses a complete set of all significant Lockheed air lifters used by the Air Force and Army since World War II. A number of the aircraft are the first, last or only examples of their model.

- Beechcraft C-45G Expeditor 51-11795
- Bell UH-1N Iroquois 69-15475
- Boeing B-17G Flying Fortress 44-83624
- Boeing KB-50J Superfortress 49-0389
- Boeing KC-97L Stratofreighter 53-230
- Boeing KC-135E Stratotanker 57-1507
- Boeing-Stearman PT-17 Kaydet
- Cessna U-3 58-2126
- Convair C-131D Samaritan 55-295
- Convair F-106A Delta Dart 59-0023
- de Havilland Canada C-7A Caribou 63-9760
- Douglas A-26C Invader 44-35523
- Douglas C-47A Skytrain 42-92841 "Turf & Sport Special"
- Douglas C-54M Skymaster 44-9030
- Douglas C-124A Globemaster II 49-0258
- Douglas C-133B Cargomaster 59-0536
- Fairchild C-119C Flying Boxcar 48-0352
- Fairchild C-119G Flying Boxcar RCAF 22118
- Fairchild C-123K Provider 54-0658
- Kaman HH-43B Huskie 62-4532
- Laister-Kauffman TG-4A 42-53078
- Lockheed C-5A Galaxy 69-0014
- Lockheed C-60 Lodestar
- Lockheed C-130E Hercules 69-6580
- Lockheed C-141A Starlifter 61-2775
- Lockheed C-141B Starlifter 64-0626
- Lockheed L-1049E Super Constellation c/n 4557
- Lockheed T-33A 52-9497
- McDonnell F-101B Voodoo 59-0428
- McDonnell Douglas C-9A Nightingale 67-22584
- McDonnell Douglas KC-10 Extender 79-0433
- McDonnell Douglas VC-9C 73-1682
- Vultee BT-13 Valiant 42-1639
- Waco CG-4A 45-15009

== See also ==
- List of United States Air Force museums
