= Travis Air Force Base Aviation Museum =

- Location within California
- Former names: Travis Air Museum; Jimmy Doolittle Air & Space Museum; Travis Air Force Base Heritage Center
- Established: 1986
- Location: Travis Air Force Base, in Fairfield, California
- Coordinates: 38.269842°N 121.931516°W
- Type: Aviation museum
- Visitors: 20,000+ yearly
- Founder: Col. Tony Burshnick
- Website: www.travisafbaviationmuseum.org

The Travis Air Force Base Aviation Museum (former names include Travis Air Museum, Jimmy Doolittle Air & Space Museum, and Travis Air Force Base Heritage Center) is an aviation museum located at Travis Air Force Base in Fairfield, California. The museum houses 35+ aircraft displays and various other informative artifacts.

== History ==
In 1982, at the request of Col Tony Burshnick, Commander, 60th Military Airlift Wing, Travis Air Force Base and a group of aviation enthusiasts, most of whom are retired Air Force members, established the Travis Air Force Base Historical Society, a non-profit, tax-exempt organization, for the purpose of creating an air museum on base. The following year, the Travis Air Museum was established with the approval of the Secretary of the Air Force and Public Affairs, albeit with no facility. The mission of the museum was to help preserve the heritage of the Air Force, the history of Travis Air Force Base and airlift in the Pacific. The Society then began a vigorous campaign to obtain aircraft and other artifacts for the museum. When the old commissary on base was vacated in 1986, Col John Tait, Commander, 60th Military Airlift Wing, Travis Air Force Base, made it available to house the accumulated artifacts. Within a year, Travis Air Force Base museum officially became the Travis Air Museum.

In 1989, the museum planned to recover the B-17 Swamp Ghost from Papua New Guinea.

In the spring of 2001, with the blessing of the Jimmy Doolittle family and Lieutenant General Ronald C. Marcotte, Vice Commander, Air Mobility Command, the foundation's request to rename the new Travis Air Force Base Museum in honor of the late General (Ret) James H. Doolittle was approved.

In the spring of 2003, the 61st Doolittle Raider Reunion was hosted by the Travis Air Force Base Museum, the Jimmy Doolittle Air and Space Museum Foundation and local communities.

=== Expansion plans ===
During 2000, the museum working group determined that a new Travis Air Force Base museum was not only necessary, but was also in the best interests of both the Air Force and the local community. A new site was identified: some 16 acres near the Travis Air Force Base hospital. The Campaign for the "Aviation Museum of the New Millennium" began and an artist's conception of the new museum building was created.

After the September 11, 2001 attacks, security changes on base and other considerations resulted in a search for another base site.

From 2004 to 2009, guidance and advice on the challenges of building a new museum were obtained from many sources, in particular the National Air and Space Museum in Washington, D.C., the Strategic Air and Space Museum in Omaha, Nebraska, the Museum of Flight in Seattle, Washington and the Museum of Aviation at Robins Air Force Base, Georgia.

In the spring of 2010, Colonel James C. Vechery, Commander, 60th Air Mobility Wing, Travis Air Force Base officially confirmed that a parcel of property on Travis Air Force Base accessible to the general public would be the home of a new Air Force-owned and operated Air Museum.

In April 2011, the foundation had raised approximately $1 million of the required $34+ million. Many companies and persons have donated, including Jelly Belly Candy Company, which is headquartered in Fairfield, California, and an endorsement by actor Tom Hanks. In July 2011, a new design plan for the proposed expansion was released by the fundraising committee, Wings of Valor Capital Campaign.

As of 2014, the foundation has found a lot near the Nut Tree Airport. This area will give the military and non-military public a chance to view the history of the collection.

=== Present ===
The museum opened new exhibits about uniforms and warrant officers in May 2026.

== Exhibits ==
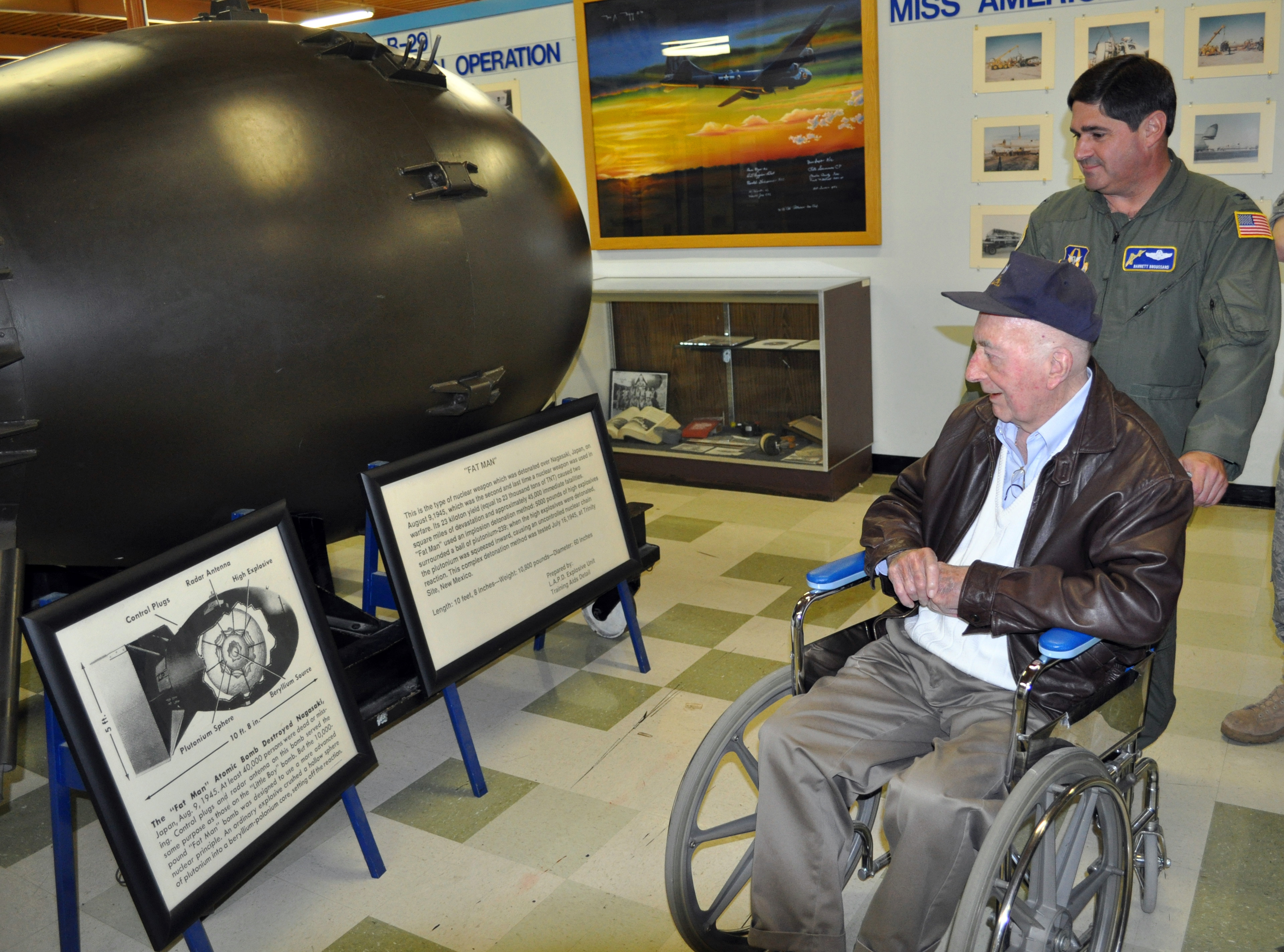
Veteran Col. Barrett Broussard browses a Fat Man atomic bomb replica at an exhibit inside the museum

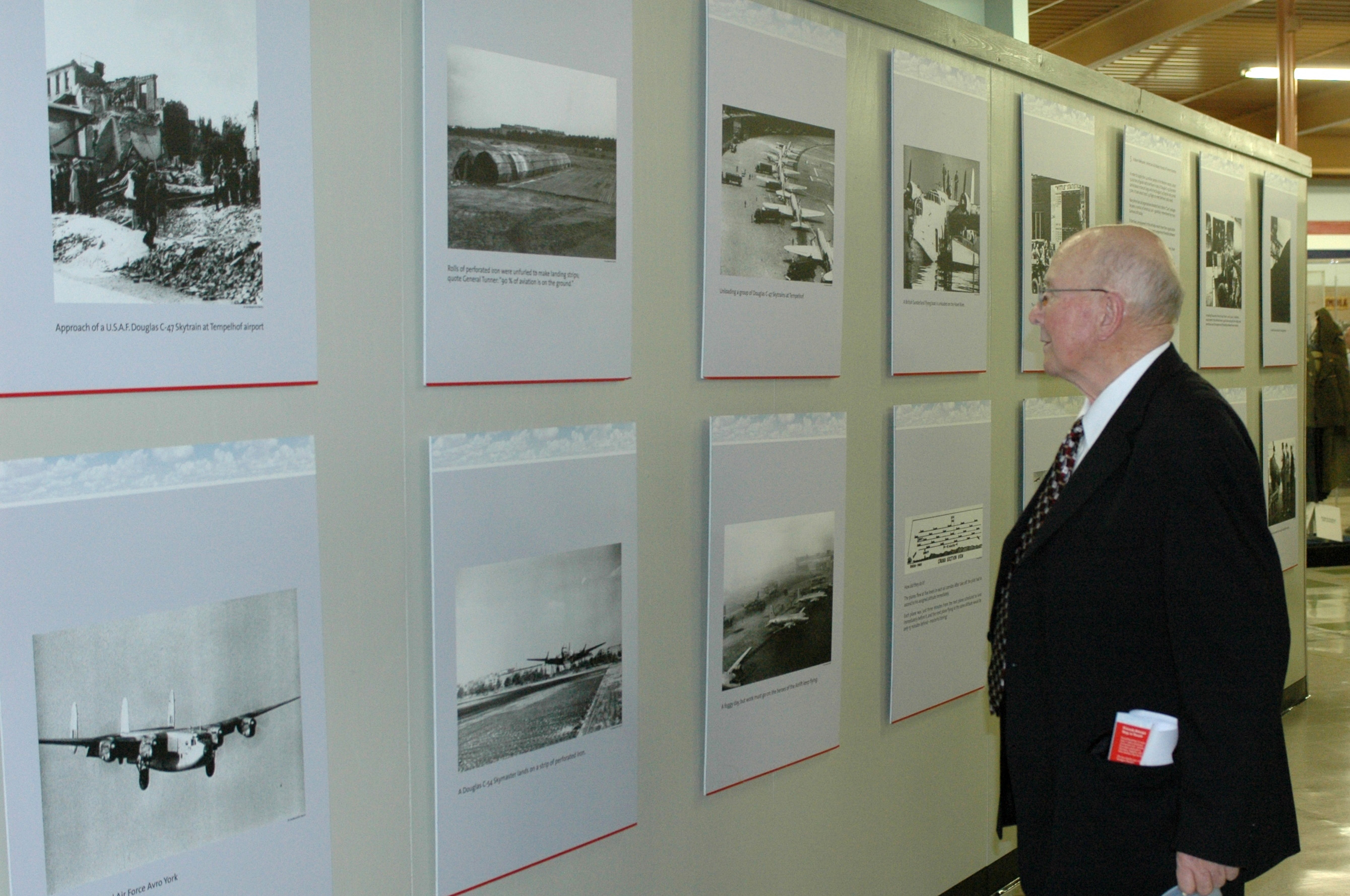
Veteran Lt. Col. Clinton Hankins browses the Berlin Airlift exhibit inside the museum. Lt. Col. Hawkins was a pilot during the operation.

- Basic trainers – This area of the museum covers training equipment and aircraft that have been involved with Travis Air Force Base throughout the years. Museum artifacts include an F-100 simulator, T-37 simulator, BT-13 Valiant, and PT-19.
- Early years – This area of the museum is an informational and educational dedication to the Wright Brothers, the founders of modern powered flight.
- Inter-war years – The inter war exhibit is a dedication to peacetime flight in America between the World Wars. It covers the 1927 Grand Canyon flights, Billy Mitchell's Bombers, the "Spirit of St. Louis", and a display of an AT-17 Bobcat trainer.
- World War II – This section of the museum houses exhibits on the Flying Tigers, the Doolittle Raid, Women Airforce Service Pilots, a Fat Man atomic bomb, and two aircraft displays, a L-4 Grasshopper and Waco CG-4 glider.
- Cold War – This museum exhibit is extensive, and covers the Berlin Airlift, early Strategic Air Command operations of the base, and miscellaneous information about the accomplishments of Travis airmen during that time.
- Korean War – Travis Air Force Base played a large role in the Korean War. The museum mirrors this with a display of a C-119 Flying Boxcar (outside), display of General Robert F. Travis's B-29 Superfortress crash artifacts, and information on how Travis Air Force Base became the "Gateway to the Pacific".
- Vietnam War – This area of the museum covers operations of the time, such as Operation Homecoming. There is also a dedication to Vietnam nurses.
- Modern flight – The museum highlights the fact that Travis Air Force Base was the home of some significant modern aircraft. There are displays on the C-141 Starlifter, C-5 Galaxy, strategic airlift, and aerial refueling.
- Space exploration – This section of the museum houses dedications to the Mercury space program, the Gemini space program, and a display of an X-15 prototype rocket engine.
- Humanitarian missions – This exhibit contains displays about various humanitarian missions throughout the years, including Operation Babylift, in which South Vietnamese orphans were flown out of Vietnam in 1975.
- Miscellaneous collections – The museum also houses many original pieces of art, various aircraft engines, both radial/reciprocating and turbine, an AGM-28 Hound Dog cruise missile, military uniforms, a military coin collection, and an extensive research library.

== Collection ==
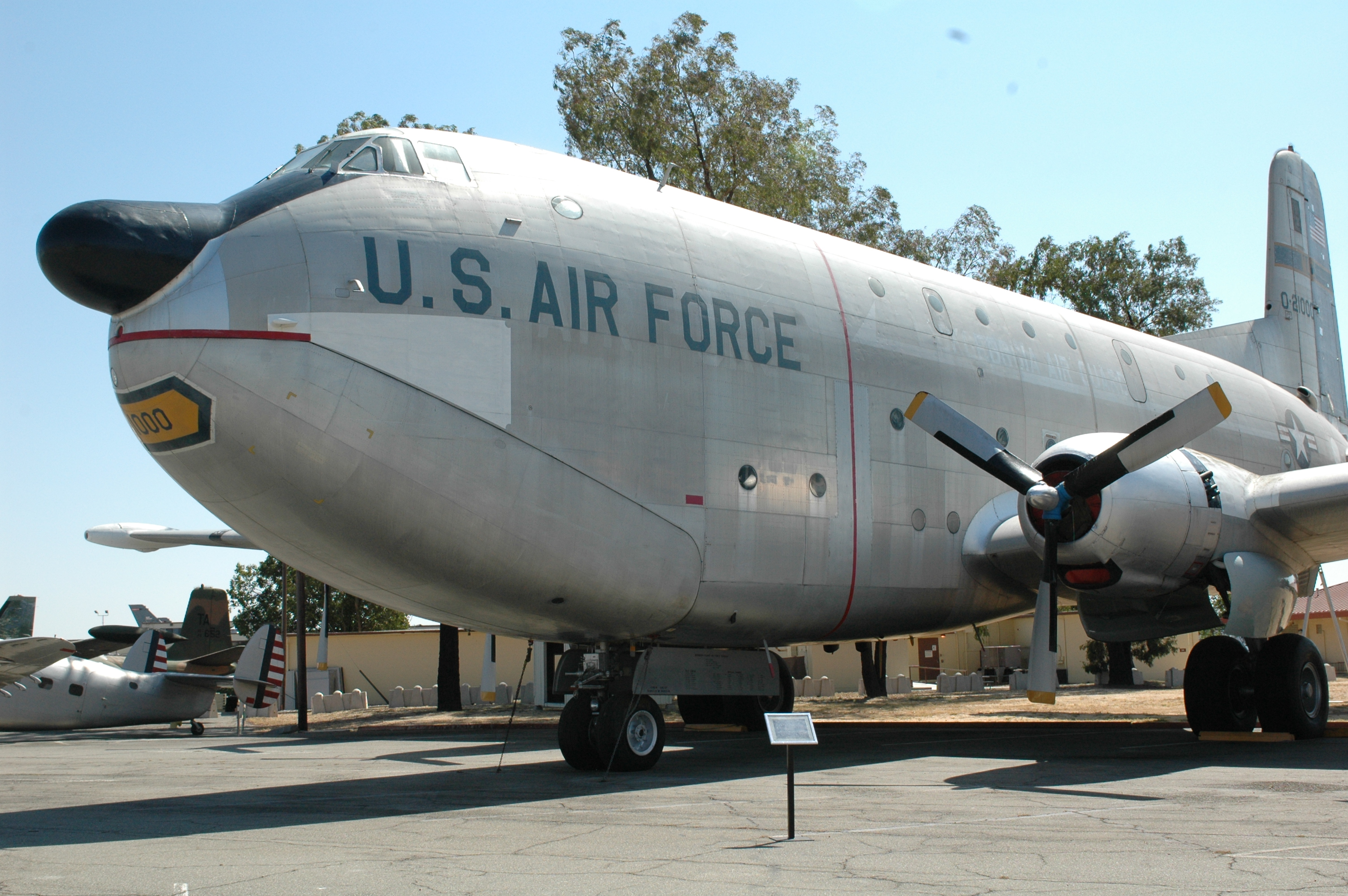
C-124C Globemaster II display in the outdoor air park. This aircraft model was stationed at Travis Air Force Base from 1953 to 1967.

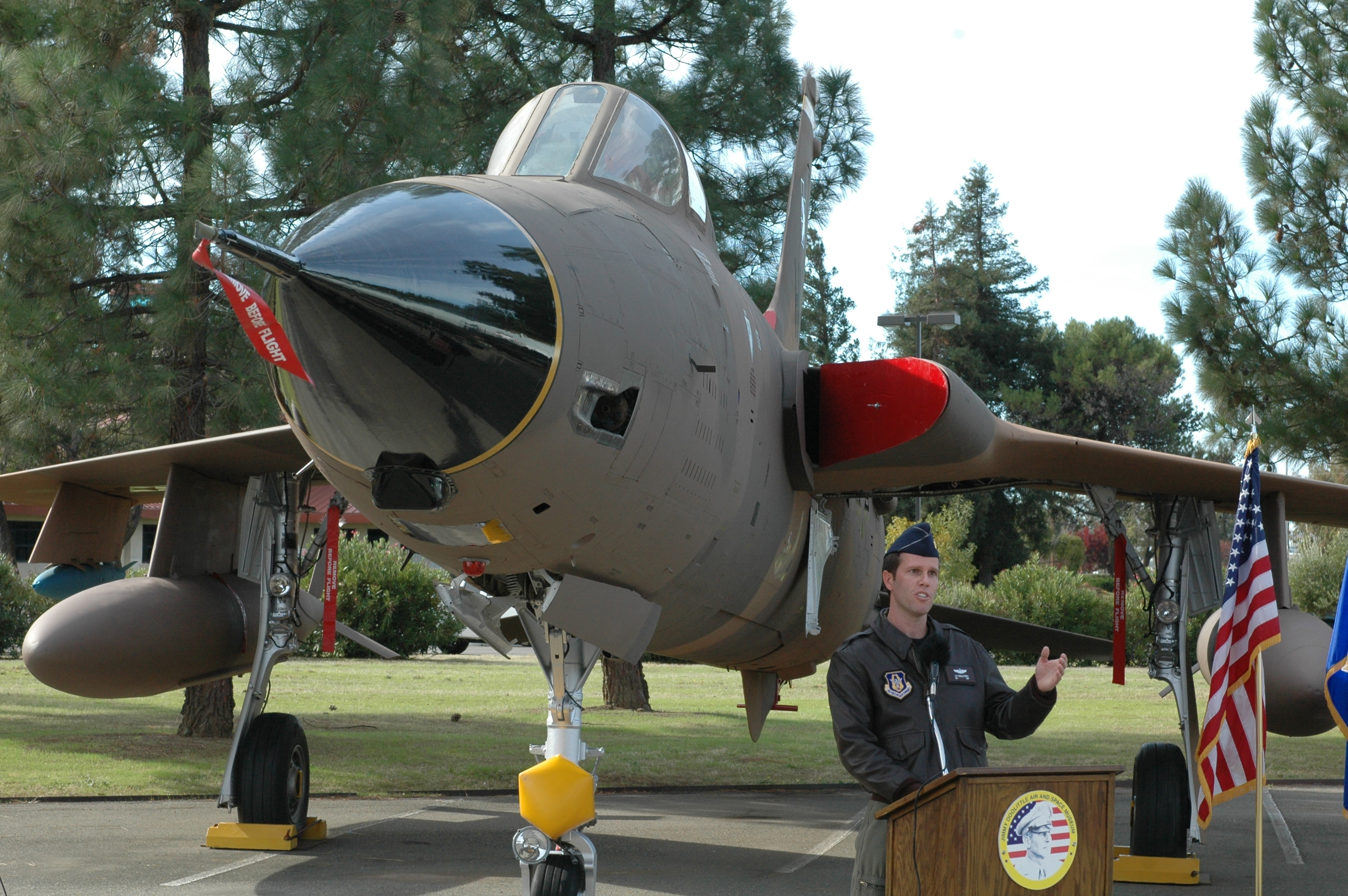
F-105D Thunderchief exhibit opening ceremony with speaker Maj. James Wahleithner

=== Indoors ===
- Fairchild PT-19
- Piper L-4
- Stinson L-5 Sentinel
- Vultee BT-13 Valiant
- Cessna O-2A Skymaster
- Waco CG-4

=== Outdoor ===
- Beechcraft AT-11 Kansan
- Beechcraft C-45H Expeditor
- Boeing B-29 Superfortress
- Boeing B-52D Stratofortress
- Cessna U-3A
- Convair C-131D Samaritan
- Convair F-102A Delta Dagger
- de Havilland Canada C-7A Caribou
- Douglas A-26K Counter Invader
- Douglas C-47A Skytrain
- Douglas C-54Q Skymaster
- Douglas C-118A Liftmaster
- Douglas C-124C Globemaster II
- Douglas C-133A Cargomaster
- Fairchild C-119G Flying Boxcar
- Fairchild C-123K Provider
- Grumman HU-16E Albatross
- Lockheed C-5A Galaxy
- Lockheed C-56 Lodestar
- Lockheed C-141B Starlifter
- Lockheed T-33 Shooting Star
- Lockheed VC-140 JetStar
- North American CT-39A Sabreliner
- North American F-86L Sabre
- North American F-100 Super Sabre
- McDonnell F-101B Voodoo
- McDonnell Douglas F-4C Phantom II
- Republic F-84F Thunderstreak

== See also ==
- Travis Air Force Base
- List of United States Air Force museums
