= Curtiss Oriole =

American general-purpose biplane

Oriole
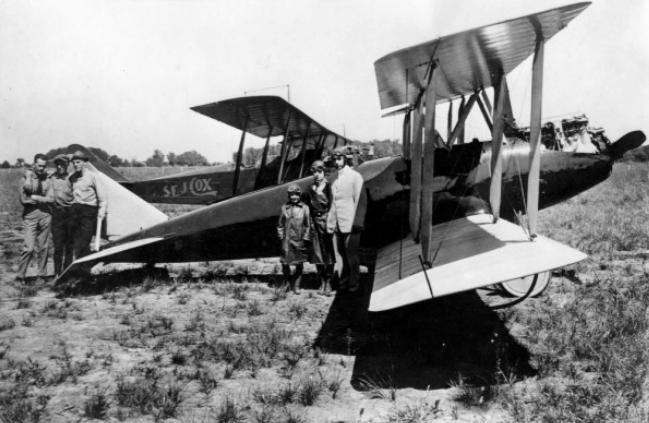
- Curtiss Oriole at Houston, 1919

General information
- Type: Light aircraft
- National origin: United States
- Manufacturer: Curtiss Aircraft

History
- First flight: 1919

The Curtiss Oriole (Curtiss Model 17) was an American three-seat general-purpose biplane.

== Design ==
The Oriole fuselage was constructed using laminated wood to form a monocoque body and was powered by either the Curtiss OX-5 V-8 or the Curtiss K-6 engine. The aircraft featured a self-starter and a tall thin radiator in the pilot's field of view.

== Operational history ==
Surplus Curtiss Oriole wings were sold to Harold Pitcairn to manufacture the first production Pitcairn aircraft, the Pitcairn PA-3 Orowing.

Northwest Airlines was founded on August 1, 1926, flying a Curtiss Oriole and a Thomas Morse Biplane on the CAM-9 Airmail route from Minneapolis to Chicago.

Admiral Byrd selected a Curtiss Oriole as second aircraft for his 1926 Arctic Expedition to the North Pole with a Fokker F.VII. The Oriole was planned to be used for photography and rescue work. The New York times reported (falsely) that the Oriole was shipped on the steamer Chantier in case the Fokker was unavailable. However the Oriole never was planned as a backup to the Fokker. It did not have the range to fly nonstop from Spitzbergen to the North Pole and back.

A leased Curtiss Oriole was deployed by the 109th Observation Squadron in 1921. The aircraft was flown to Washington D.C. to lobby for Minnesota Air Guard funding.

One Curtiss Oriole were sold to Brazilian Naval Aviation in 1926.

Syd (brother of Charlie) Chaplin Air Line used Curtiss Oriole(s) for its one year of operation in 1920.

== Variants ==
Igor Sikorsky offered a kit to replace the lower wings with a smaller pair with less drag-producing struts and wires. One example with this modification and a 150 hp Hispano-Suiza upgrade, was entered in the 1927 National Air Races. Before the races, the engine was upgraded again to a Hispano-Suiza 220 hp engine, which overwhelmed the cooling system with metal shavings, causing the aircraft to drop out of the race.

The Ireland Comet was a rebuilt Curtiss Oriole with new flying surfaces, including a single-bay high-lift wing.

== Surviving aircraft ==
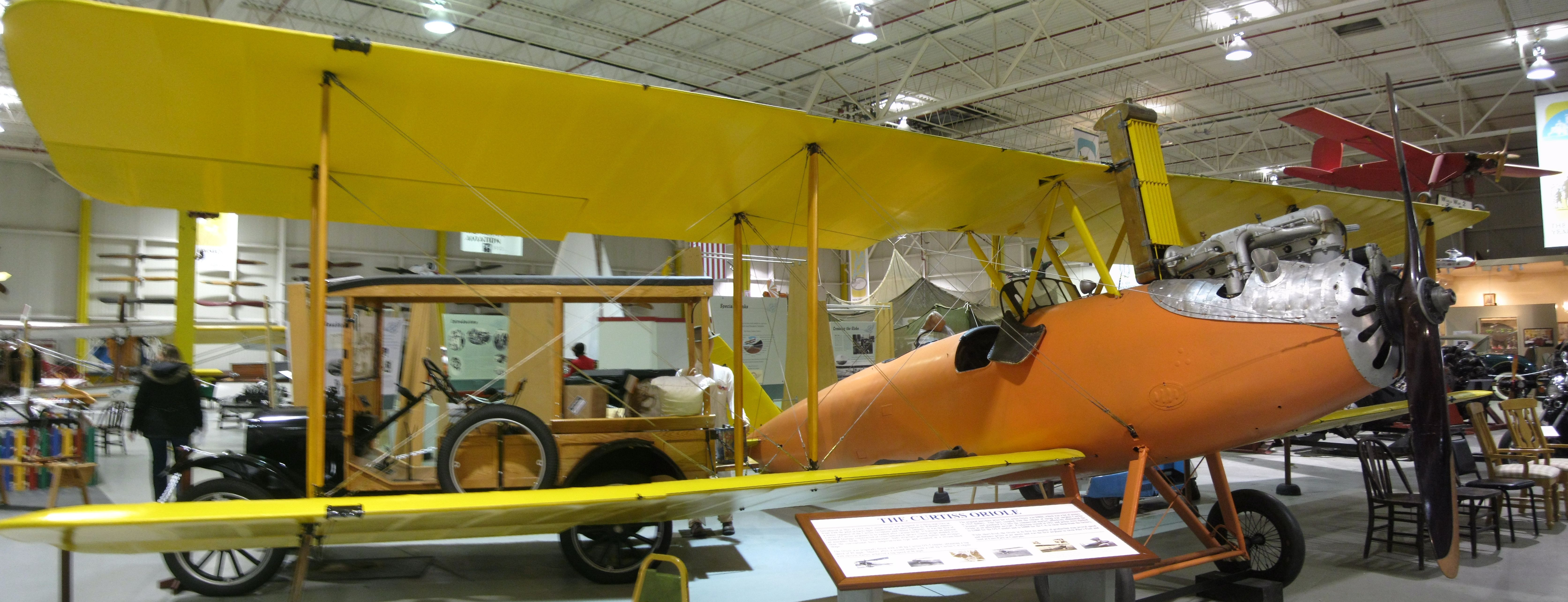
Oriole on display in the Glenn H. Curtiss Museum in Hammondsport, New York

- An Oriole is on static display at the Glenn H. Curtiss Museum in Hammondsport, New York.
- Reproduction – Oriole on static display at the Minnesota Air National Guard Museum in St. Paul, Minnesota.
- In storage at the Fantasy of Flight, in Polk City, Florida.
- Three in storage at Century Aviation in East Wenatchee, Washington.

== Specifications (short-span wings, OX-5 engine) ==
Data from Curtiss Aircraft 1907–1947

General characteristics

- Crew: one
- Capacity: two passengers
- Length: 25 ft 0 in (7.62 m)
- Wingspan: 36 ft 0 in (10.97 m)
- Height: 10 ft 1 in (3.07 m)
- Wing area: 326 sq ft (30.3 m^{2})
- Empty weight: 1,428 lb (648 kg)
- Gross weight: 2,036 lb (924 kg)
- Powerplant: 1 × Curtiss OX-5 water-cooled V-8 engine, 90 hp (67 kW)

Performance

- Maximum speed: 86 mph (138 km/h, 75 kn)
- Cruise speed: 69 mph (111 km/h, 60 kn)
- Range: 582 mi (937 km, 506 nmi)
- Service ceiling: 8,000 ft (2,400 m)
- Rate of climb: 400 ft/min (2.0 m/s)

== See also ==
- Curtiss Jenny
- Curtiss Robin
- Laird Swallow
