= Castle Air Museum =

Military aviation museum in California

- Location within California Location within the United States
- Established: November 1979
- Location: Atwater, California
- Coordinates: 37.36475°N 120.577944°W
- Type: Military aviation museum
- Founders: Cliff James; Gen. James P. McCarthy
- Website: www.castleairmuseum.org

Castle Air Museum is a military aviation museum located at Castle Airport in Atwater, California.

== History ==
=== Establishment ===
The museum was established in November 1979. The same month a B-17 was delivered to the airport. Ground was broken in December 1980 and by March 1981 a barracks and an office building from World War II had been moved to the museum site. It opened with 12 aircraft on 20 June 1981 as a branch of the United States Air Force Museum system. Only four months later, an additional four aircraft were placed on display. Then in 1983, an audit criticized leadership for poor accountability of resources, displaying aircraft outside the museum's mission, and lack of security. (Note: The original focus of the museum was on bomber and tanker aircraft.) By 1987, the museum was raising money to build a new "Flight of Fancy" exhibit building.

=== Privatization ===
The announcement that Castle Air Force Base might close in 1991 brought the risk of the aircraft being moved to another museum. However, after a study, an agreement was reached with the Air Force that the museum would remain open as a private entity. In advance of the base's closure in April 1995, an effort was made to refresh the airplanes while federal resources were still available. (Note: Around the same time, an effort to have the museum's B-24 transferred to the Imperial War Museum Duxford was blocked.) The loss of federal funding eventually caused financial problems for the museum.

Around 2002, the museum began planning for a new building to house its more delicate aircraft as well as serve as a research library.

=== Present ===
In May 2008, the museum reached its 50th displayed aircraft milestone with the addition of a Douglas A-4L Skyhawk. The aircraft was shipped to the museum in August 2006, and restored at a cost of $12,000.

In October 2013, the Museum received a retired VC-9C aircraft that had previously served during several administrations as an alternate Air Force One and Air Force Two aircraft when use of the primary VC-137 or VC-25 was impractical. Vice presidents such as Al Gore and Dick Cheney, and First Ladies such as Nancy Reagan, Barbara Bush, and Hillary Clinton, as well as presidents Ronald Reagan and Bill Clinton, were among the individuals who used the plane.

The museum received an F-16 in February 2016. In 2021, the museum received 5 aircraft from Naval Air Museum Barbers Point, which had closed two years prior. A McDonnell Douglas F-4 Phantom II was moved to the museum in July 2023. The museum opened the Copper Wings Cafe in July 2023. A UH-12 was donated to the museum in December 2023. The following May it received a TBM Avenger that had been ditched off Daytona Beach in 2022.

In June 2023, the museum announced that it had received three donations totaling $4 million to support the construction of a new Aviation Pavilion. It received an AV-8B in July 2025. Renderings for the Pavilion project, which will require 10 years to complete, were released in July 2026.

== Facilities ==
The museum resides on 35 acres (14 ha). It has a restoration facility in a World War II hangar at a separate location from the main museum grounds. Volunteers at the hangar prepare the aircraft for display.

The museum operates a nearby RV park.

== Exhibits ==
An indoor museum features artifacts, photographs, uniforms, war memorabilia, aircraft engines, and a restored B-52 cockpit.

== Collection ==
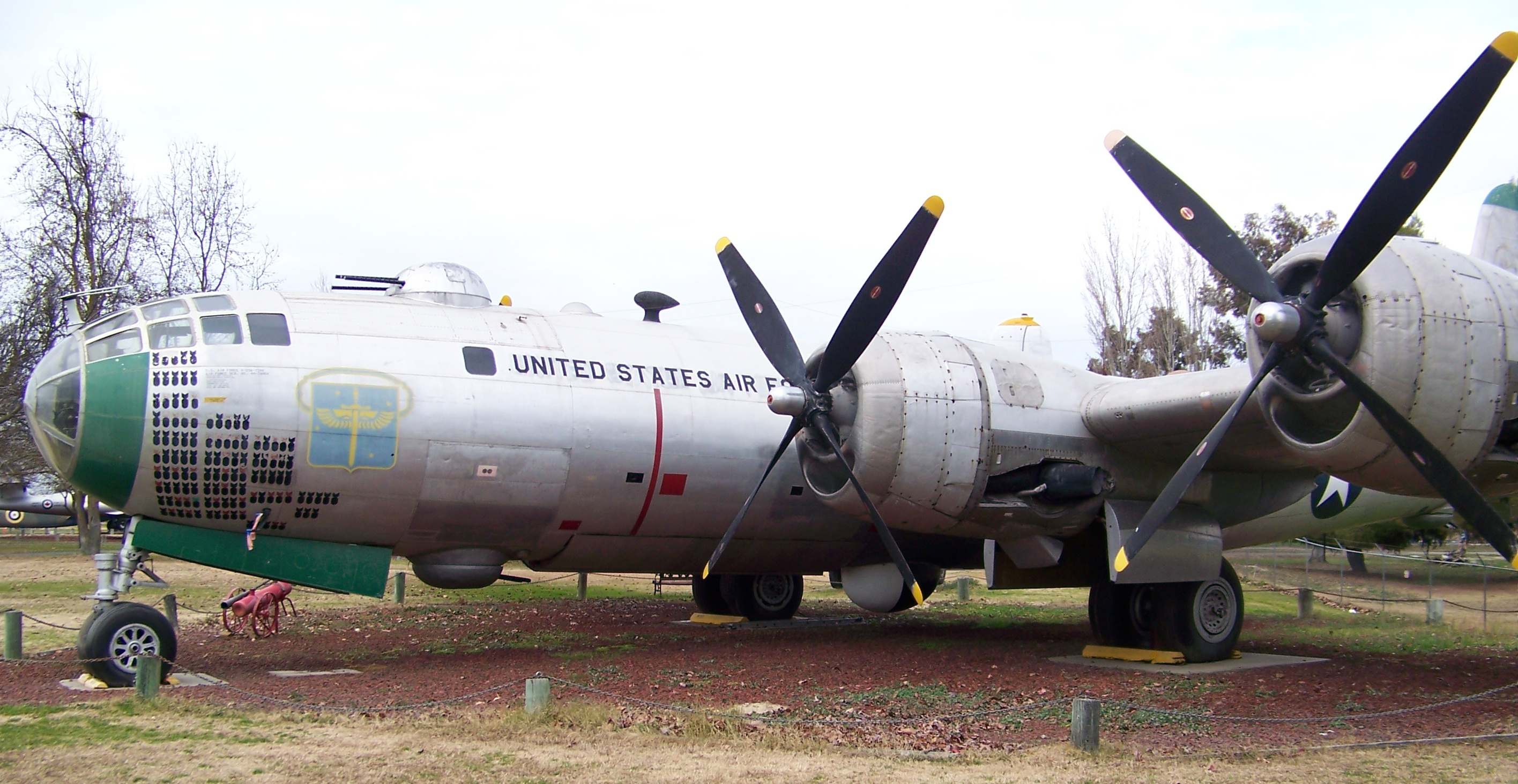
Boeing B-29A Superfortress

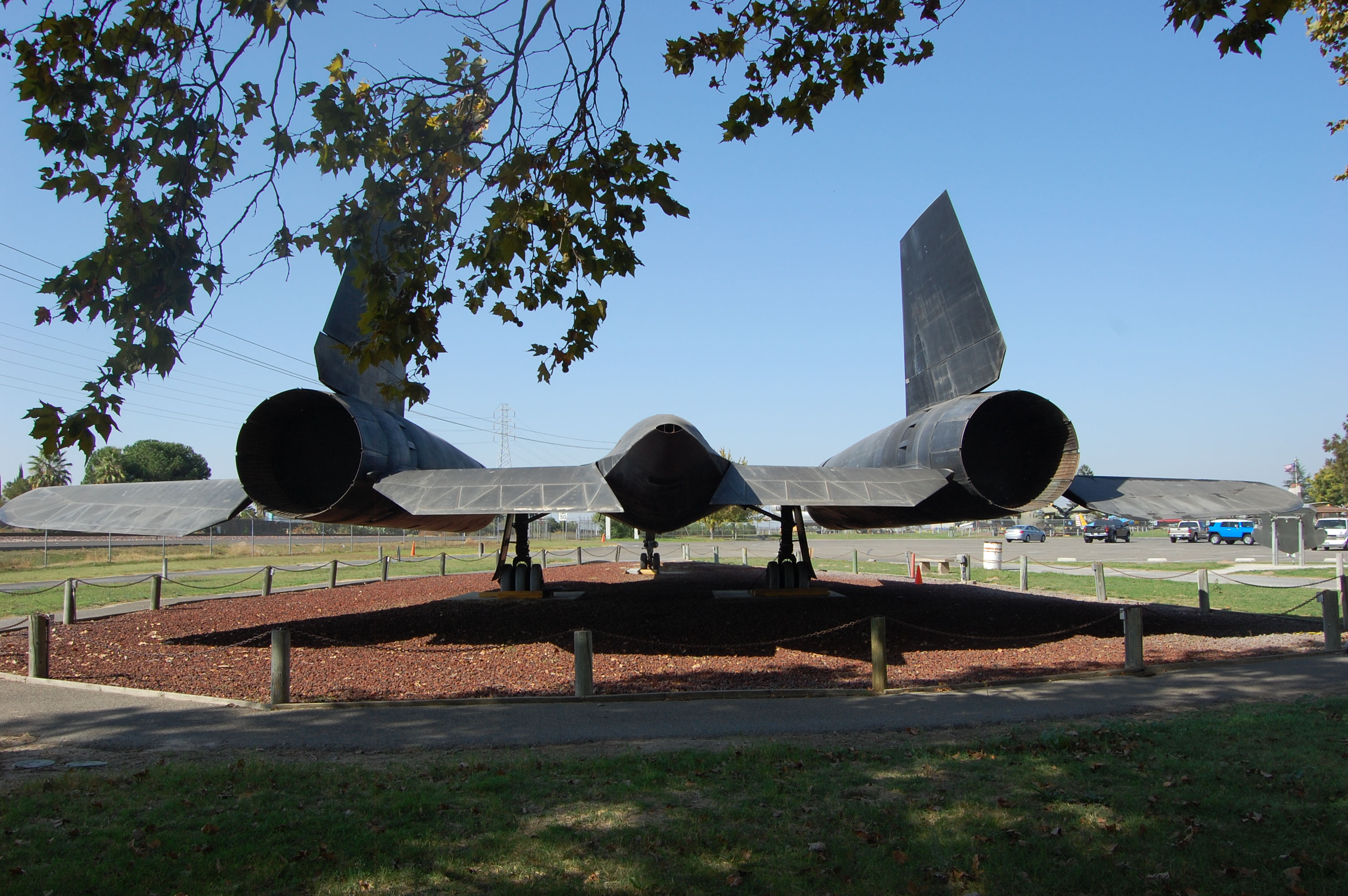
Lockheed SR-71 Blackbird

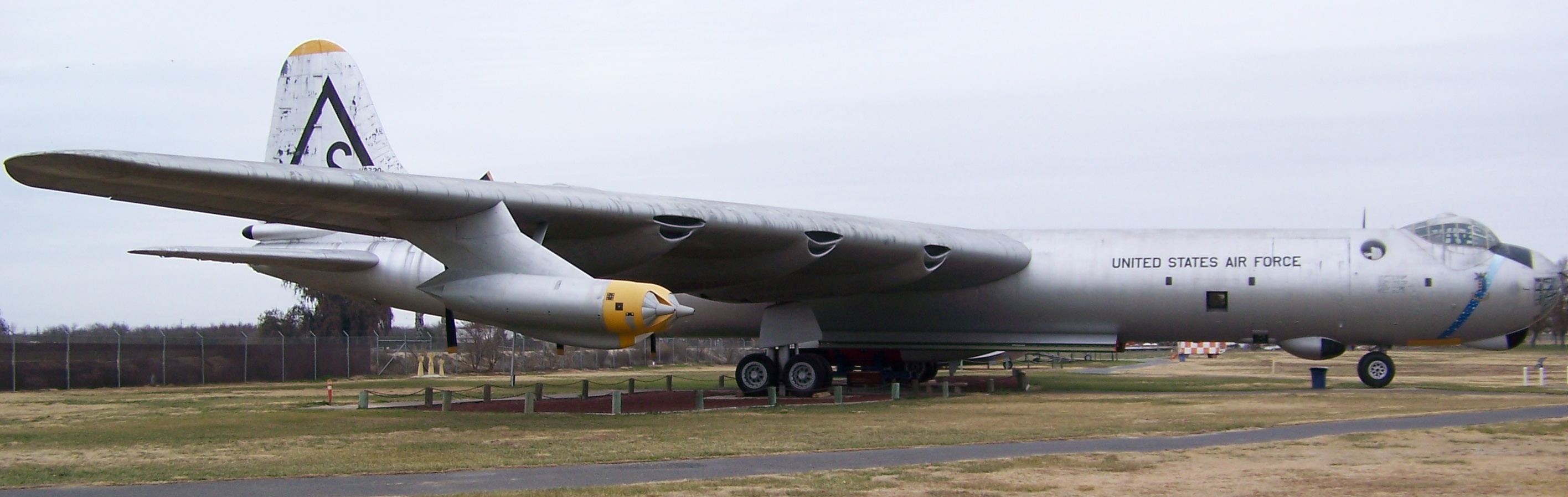
Convair RB-36H Peacemaker

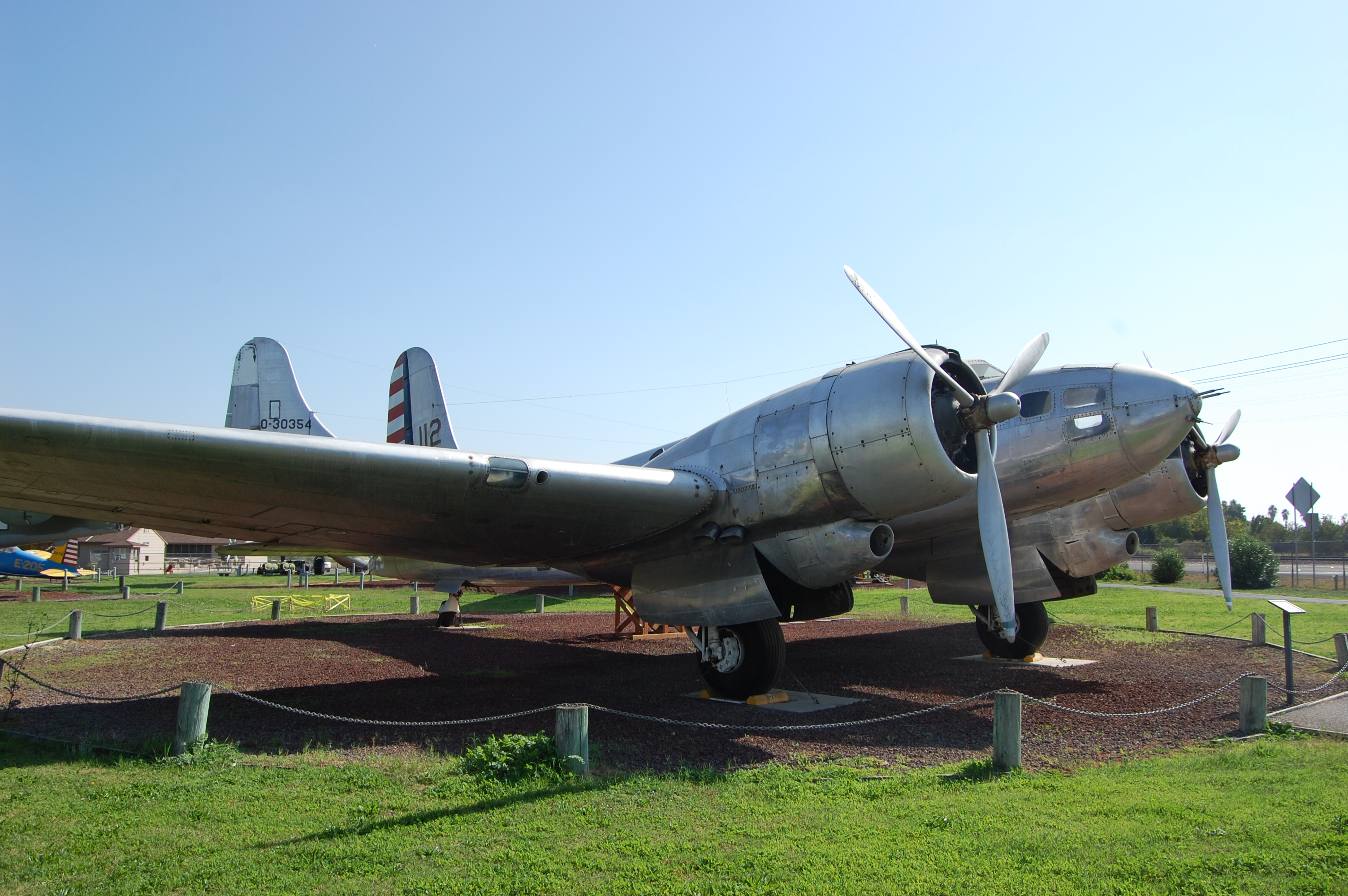
Douglas B-23 Dragon

- Avro Canada CF-100 Mk.V Canuck
- Avro Vulcan B.2
- Beech C-45G Expeditor
- Beech YT-34 Mentor
- Bell AH-1 SuperCobra
- Bell H-13 Sioux
- Boeing B-17G Flying Fortress
- Boeing B-29A Superfortress
- Boeing B-47E Stratojet
- Boeing B-52D Stratofortress
- Boeing CH-47D Chinook
- Boeing KC-97 Stratofreighter
- Boeing KC-135A Stratotanker
- Boeing WB-50 Superfortress
- Cessna 150
- Cessna O-2A Super Skymaster
- Cessna T-37B Tweet
- Cessna U-3A
- Cessna UC-78 Bobcat
- Consolidated B-24M Liberator
- Convair B-58A Hustler
- Convair F-102A Delta Dagger
- Convair F-106A Delta Dart
- Convair HC-131 Samaritan
- Convair RB-36H Peacemaker
- Curtiss C-46D Commando
- de Havilland Canada L-20 Beaver
- Douglas A-26B Invader
- Douglas A-4L Skyhawk
- Douglas B-18 Bolo
- Douglas B-23 Dragon
- Douglas C-47 Skytrain
- Douglas R5D-4 Skymaster
- Douglas RA-3B Skywarrior
- Douglas SBD-4 Dauntless
- Fairchild C-119C Flying Boxcar
- Fairchild C-123K Provider
- General Dynamics F-16A Fighting Falcon
- General Dynamics FB-111A Aardvark
- Grumman A-6E Intruder
- Grumman F-14D Tomcat
- Grumman HU-16B Albatross
- Grumman S-2 Tracker
- Kaman HH-43B Huskie
- Lockheed C-56 Lodestar
- Lockheed EC-121 Warning Star
- Lockheed F-80B Shooting Star
- Lockheed F-104B Starfighter
- Lockheed F-94A Starfire
- Lockheed F-117A Nighthawk
- Lockheed MC-130P Combat Shadow
- Lockheed SR-71 Blackbird
- Lockheed T-33
- Martin EB-57A Canberra
- McDonnell Douglas F/A-18C Hornet
- McDonnell Douglas AV-8B Harrier II
- McDonnell Douglas F-15A Eagle
- McDonnell Douglas VC-9C
- McDonnell F-101B Voodoo
- McDonnell F-4E Phantom II
- Mikoyan-Gurevich MiG-21
- North American AT-6 Texan
- North American B-25J Mitchell
- North American B-45A Tornado
- North American F-86H Sabre
- North American F-100 Super Sabre
- North American RA-5C Vigilante
- North American T-39 Saberliner
- Northrop F-89J Scorpion
- Northrop T-38 Talon
- Northrop Grumman EA-6B Prowler
- Republic F-84C Thunderjet
- Republic F-84F Thunderstreak
- Republic F-105B Thunderchief
- Saab TF 35 Draken
- Schweizer TG-3A
- Sikorsky SH-60B Seahawk
- Stinson L-5 Sentinel
- Vought RF-8G Crusader
- Vultee BT-13 Valiant
