= Selfridge Military Air Museum =

- Location within Michigan Location within the United States
- Established: 1975
- Location: Mount Clemens, Michigan
- Coordinates: 42.628°N 82.830°W
- Type: Military aviation museum
- Founder: Col. Robert A. Stone
- Director: Steve Mrozek
- Website: selfridgeairmuseum.org

The Selfridge Military Air Museum is an aviation museum located at Selfridge Air National Guard Base near Mount Clemens, Michigan.

== History ==
The museum was founded in 1975 by Colonel Robert A. Stone. The museum was moved slightly in 2000 to accommodate a new fence. The same year train trips to the museum by the Michigan Transit Museum were offered.

The museum announced plans to build a new education center in October 2021. A few months later, it began planning to build a new perimeter road for the base and public access to the museum.

== Exhibits ==
Displays at the museum include a Link Trainer, T56-A-7 turboprop engine, and two aircraft cockpits.

== Collection ==
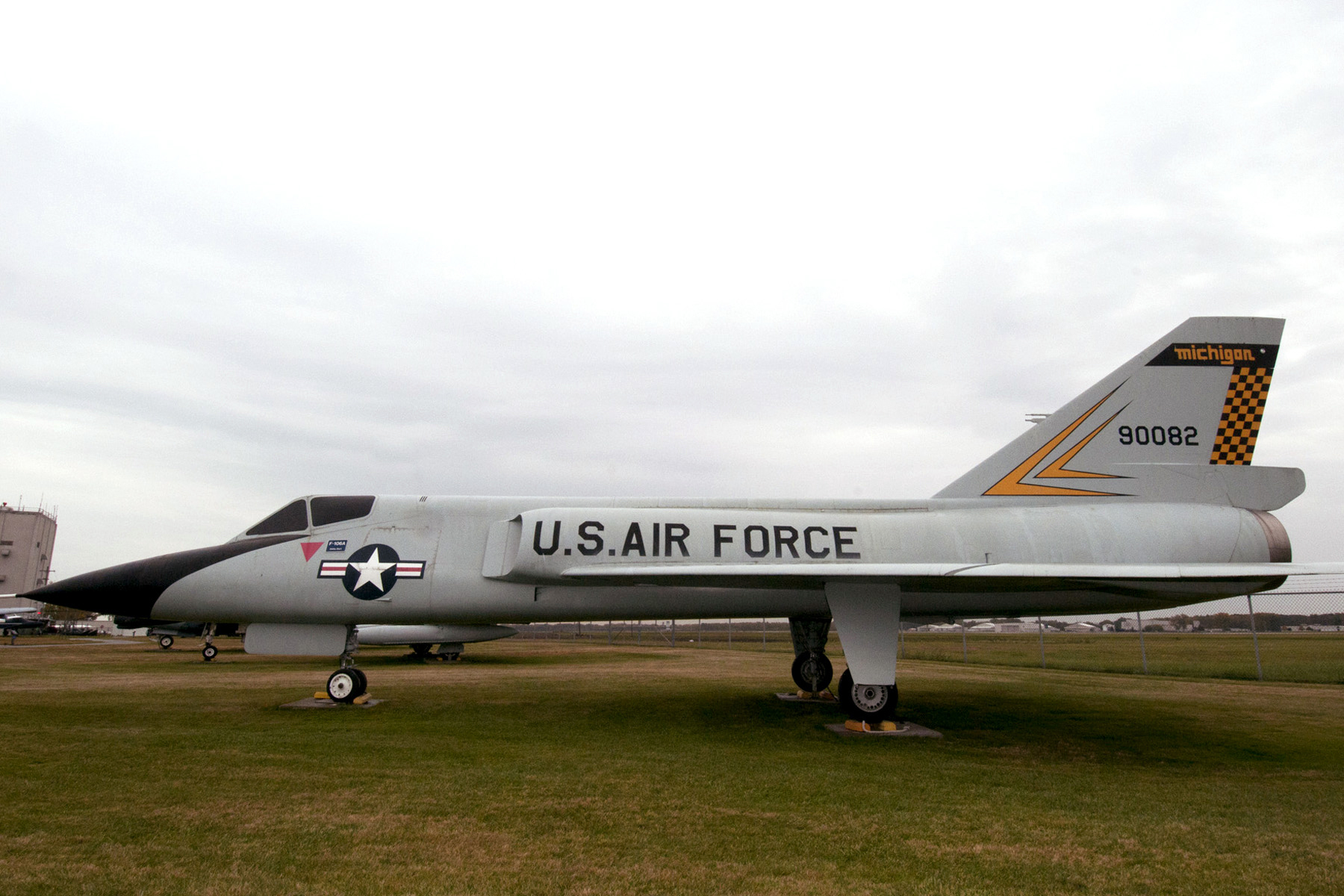
Convair F-106 Delta Dart

- Beechcraft C-45B Expeditor
- Beechcraft SNB-5 Navigator
- Bell AH-1F Cobra
- Bell UH-1H Iroquois
- Cessna O-2A Skymaster
- Cessna U-3A
- Convair C-131D Samaritan
- Convair TF-102A Delta Dagger
- Convair F-106A Delta Dart
- Douglas A-4B Skyhawk
- Douglas A-26C Invader
- Fairchild Republic A-10A Thunderbolt II
- General Dynamics F-16A Fighting Falcon
- Goodyear FG-1D Corsair
- Grumman F-14A Tomcat
- Grumman US-2A Tracker
- Lockheed C-130A Hercules
- Lockheed C-130E Hercules
- Lockheed P-3B Orion
- Lockheed T-33A
- LTV A-7D Corsair II
- Martin RB-57A Canberra
- McDonnell F-4C Phantom II
- McDonnell RF-101C Voodoo
- North American F-86A Sabre
- North American F-100D Super Sabre
- North American F-100F Super Sabre
- North American T-6 Texan
- Northrop F-89C Scorpion
- Republic F-84F Thunderstreak
- Republic RF-84F Thunderflash
- Sikorsky HH-52 Seaguard
- SPAD XIII – replica

== See also ==
- Minnesota Air National Guard Museum
- Yankee Air Museum
- List of aviation museums
