= Pitcairn PA-3 Orowing =

Type of aircraft

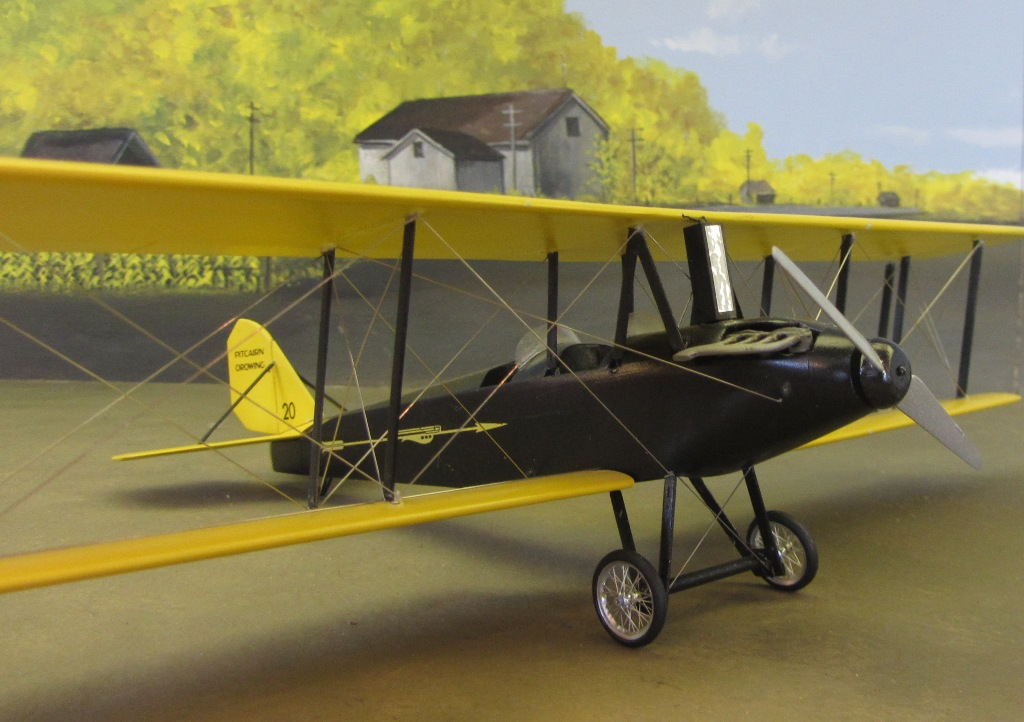
- 1926 Pitcairn PA-3 Orowing model on display at the EAA Airventure Museum

General information
- Type: Biplane
- National origin: United States of America
- Manufacturer: Pitcairn Aircraft Company
- Designer: Agnew E. Larson
- Number built: 35

History
- Introduction date: 1926
- First flight: 1926

The Pitcairn PA-3 Orowing is an early Pitcairn biplane designed for light commercial use in the early 1920s when aircraft production rates did not meet demand for airmail, training, and passenger aircraft.

== Development ==
The Orowing was the first production aircraft from Pitcairn. Pitcairn purchased surplus Curtiss Oriole wings and mated them to production fuselages. The name "Orowing" is a mix of the PA-2 "Sesquiwing" and the Curtiss "Oriole". The initial production run also was powered by 250 surplus Curtiss OX-5 engines.

== Design ==
The three place Biplane was made of welded steel tube fuselage with an OX-5 engine. The aircraft featured dual controls for flight instruction. The wings were purchased from Curtiss and were the same design as a Curtiss Oriole.

== Operational history ==
Most Orrowing production was sold to Pitcairn Aviation for flight training and charters.

An Orowing flew in the 1926 Ford National Reliability Air Tour.

== Specifications (Pitcairn PA-3 Orowing) ==
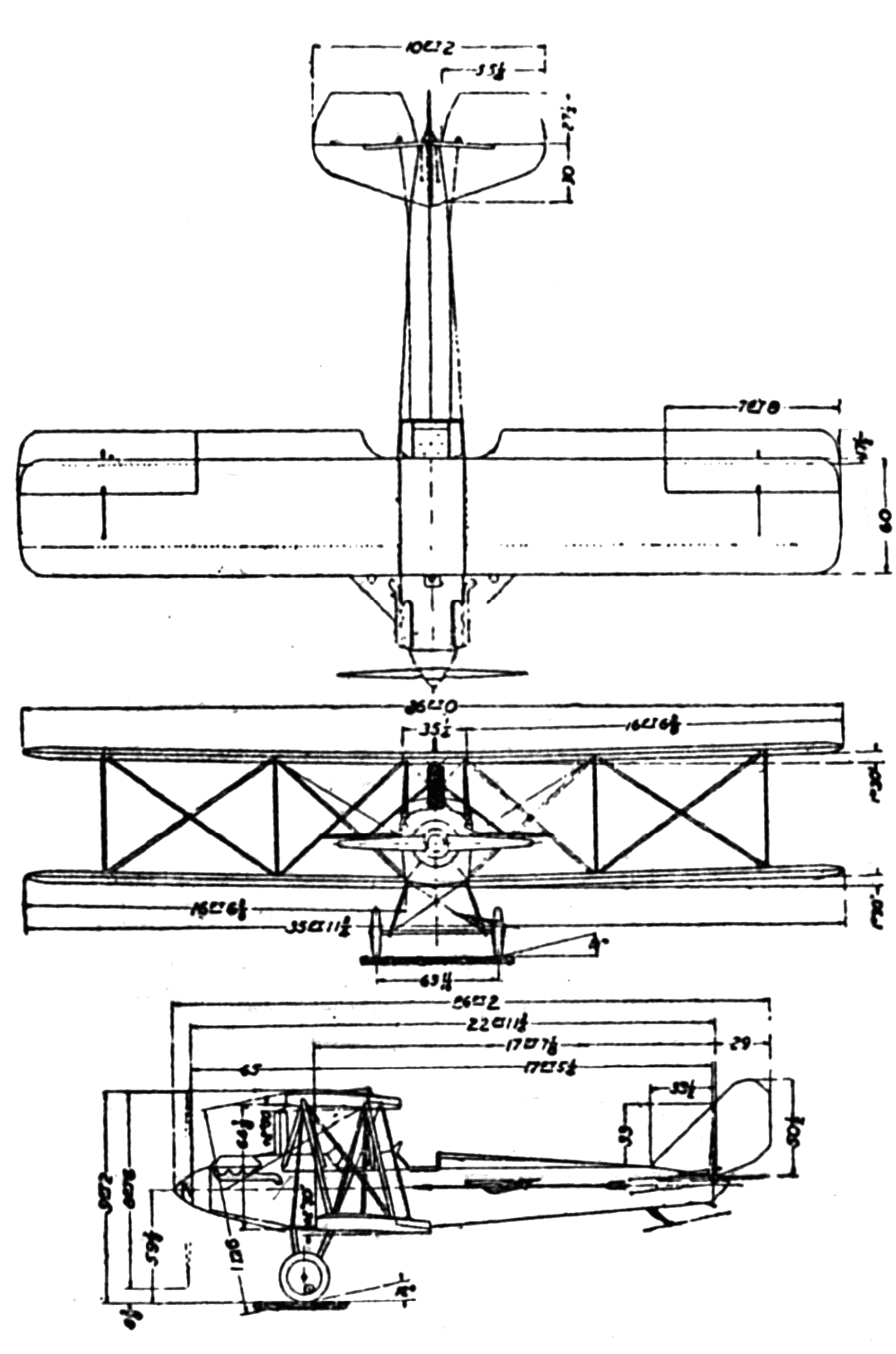
Pitcairn PA-3 Orowing 3-view drawing from Le Document aéronautique February,1927

Data from The Pitcairn Aerowing

General characteristics

- Crew: 1
- Capacity: 2 passengers
- Length: 26 ft 2 in (7.98 m)
- Wingspan: 36 ft 0 in (10.97 m)
- Height: 2 ft 2 1/2 in (0.673 m)
- Wing area: 338.37 sq ft (31.436 m^{2})
- Airfoil: RAF 15 modified
- Empty weight: 1,345 lb (610 kg)
- Gross weight: 2,100 lb (953 kg)
- Fuel capacity: 30 US gal (25 imp gal; 110 L)
- Powerplant: 1 × Curtiss OX-5 , 90 hp (67 kW)
- Propellers: 2-bladed

Performance

- Maximum speed: 78 kn (90 mph, 140 km/h)
- Cruise speed: 70 kn (80 mph, 130 km/h)
- Stall speed: 39 kn (45 mph, 72 km/h)
- Range: 350 nmi (400 mi, 640 km)
- Endurance: 4 hr
- Service ceiling: 10,500 ft (3,200 m)
