= McDonnell Douglas C-9 =

Military transport aircraft series based on the DC-9

C-9 Nightingale/Skytrain II
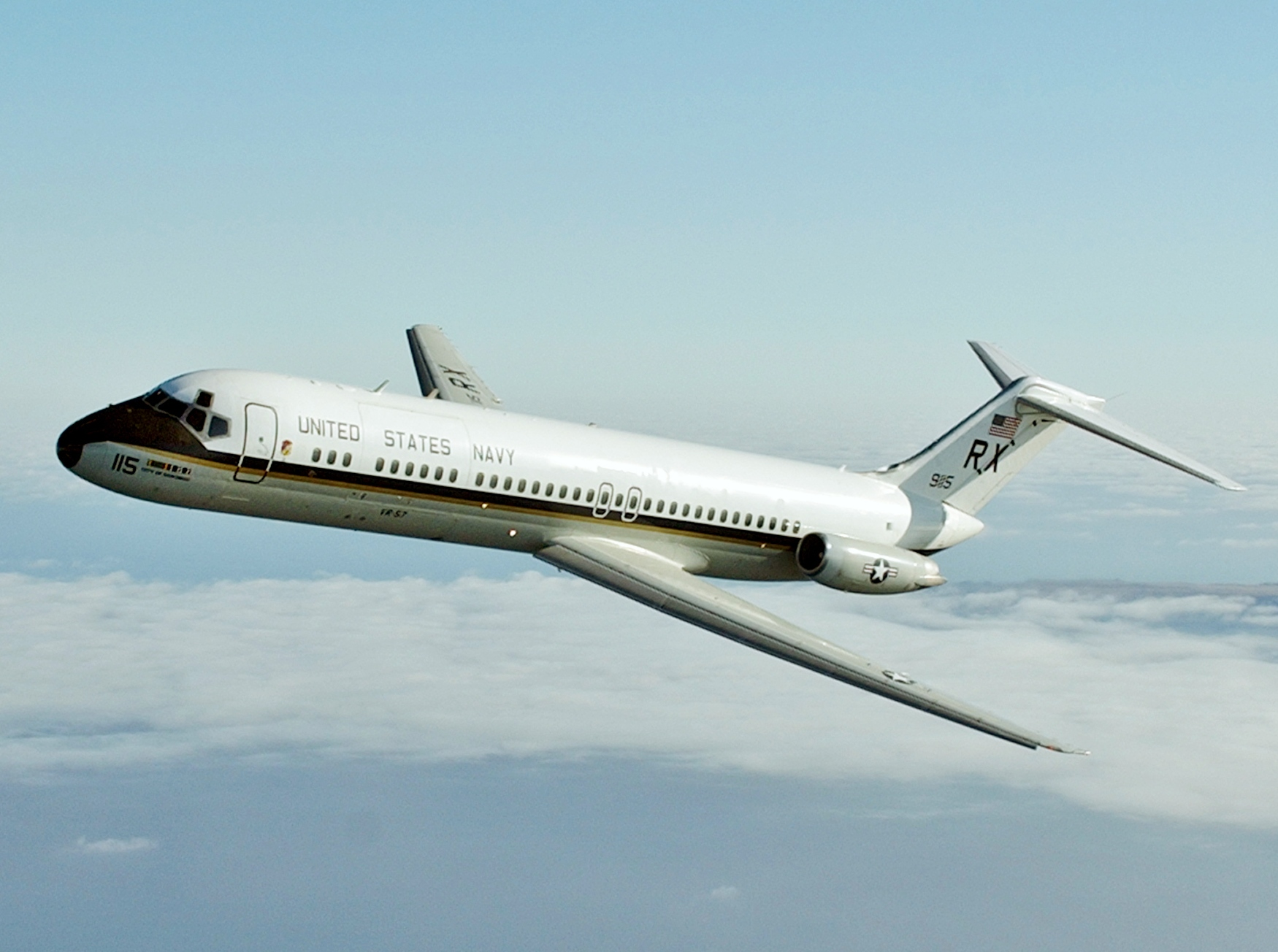
- A C-9B Skytrain II of the US Navy

General information
- Type: Military transport aircraft
- National origin: United States
- Manufacturer: McDonnell Douglas
- Status: Retired
- Primary users: United States Air Force (historical) United States Navy (historical); United States Marine Corps (historical); Kuwait Air Force (historical)
- Number built: 48

History
- Introduction date: 1968
- Retired: September 2005 (USAF C-9A); July 2014 (USN C-9B); April 2017 (USMC C-9B)
- Developed from: McDonnell Douglas DC-9

The McDonnell Douglas C-9 is a retired military version of the McDonnell Douglas DC-9 airliner. It was produced as the C-9A Nightingale for the United States Air Force, and the C-9B Skytrain II for the U.S. Navy and Marine Corps. The final flight of the C-9A Nightingale was in September 2005, and the C-9C was retired in September 2011. The U.S. Navy retired its last C-9B in July 2014. The two remaining C-9s in Marine service were retired in April 2017.

Despite being officially retired, one C-9B, BuNo 161529, was seen as late as November 2020 being operated by the U.S. Air Force as an experimental sensor testbed.

== Design and development ==
In 1966, the U.S. Air Force identified a need for an aeromedical transport aircraft and ordered C-9A Nightingale aircraft the following year. Deliveries began in 1968. The U.S. Air Force received 21 C-9A aircraft from 1968 to 1969. The C-9As were used for medical evacuation, passenger transportation, and special missions from 1968 to 2005. The C-9A were named for English social reformer Florence Nightingale (1820–1910), the founder of modern nursing.

A C-9B Skytrain II offloading on the ramp at Naval Air Station Brunswick.

After selecting a modified DC-9 for passenger and cargo transport, the U.S. Navy ordered its first five C-9Bs, bureau numbers 159030 through 159034. However, since the Air Force was responsible for moving military personnel from place to place in the early 1970s under the Military Airlift Command, this order was canceled.

The Navy documented to Congress that their people were being given last seating on Air Force flights. Congress authorized the Navy to fly its own passenger/cargo jets shortly thereafter. The Navy ordered eight aircraft, bureau numbers 159113 through 159120. The first four went to VR-30 at NAS Alameda in California for West Coast logistical support while the second four went to VR-1 at Norfolk in Virginia for East Coast support. An additional six aircraft, bureau numbers 160046 through 160051 were delivered to the Navy and the Marine Corps in 1976 with the first two aircraft being delivered to the Marine Corps at MCAS Cherry Point, the second two delivered to VR-1 at NAS Norfolk and the last two delivered to VR-30 at NAS Alameda. An additional ten more new and ten used DC-9s were purchased and converted to C-9B for the Navy. The last C-9B to fly for the Navy was retired on 28 June 2014.

Many of the Navy's C-9Bs had a higher maximum gross take-off weight of 110,000 lb (50,000 kg). Auxiliary fuel tanks were installed in the lower cargo hold to augment the aircraft's range to nearly 2,600 nautical miles (3,000 mi; 4,800 km) for overseas missions, along with the addition of tail mounted infrared scramblers to counter heat seeking missile threats in hostile environments.

== Operational history ==
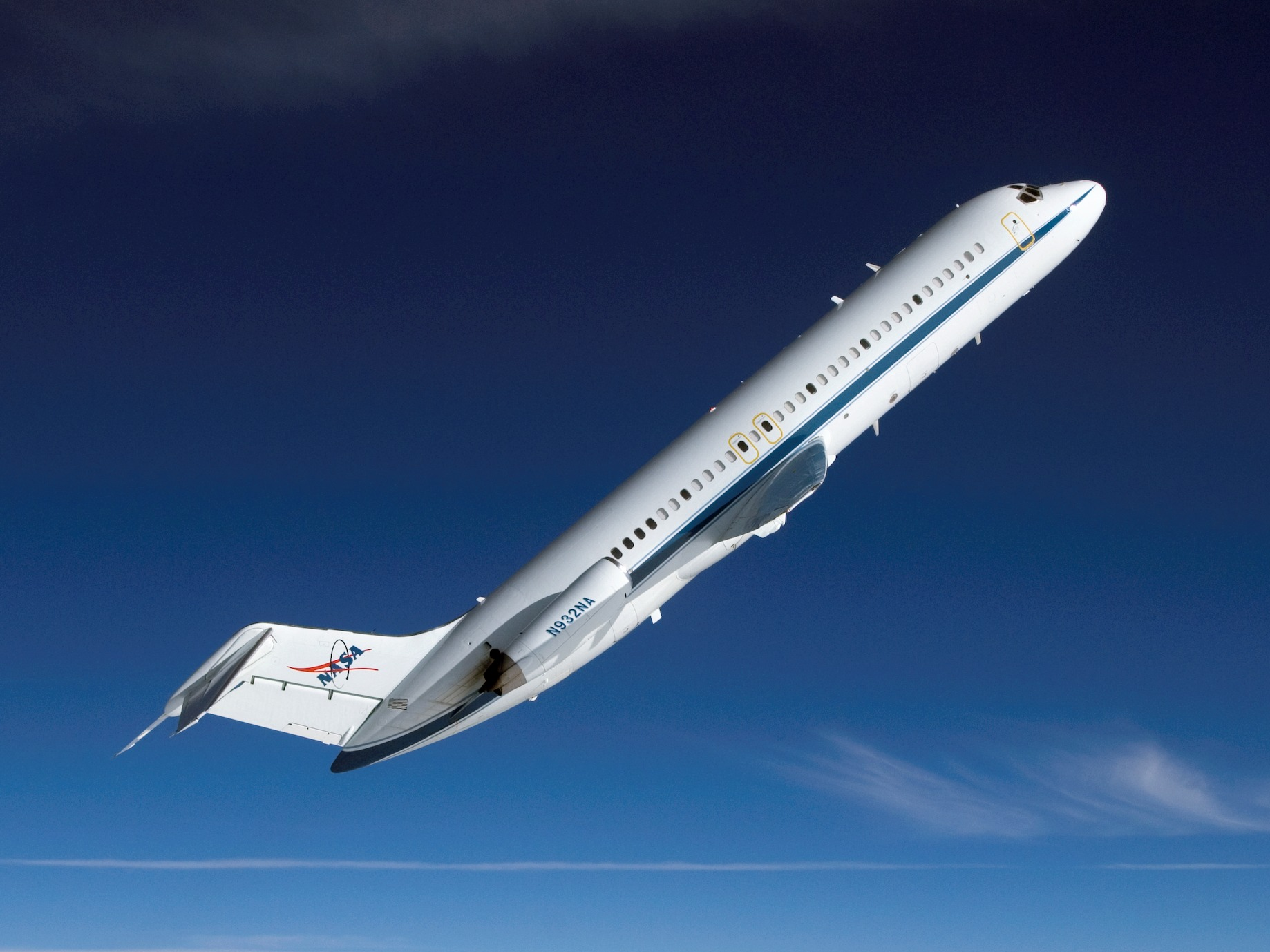
NASA 932 reduced-gravity aircraft during parabolic flight

The C-9B aircraft have provided cargo and passenger transportation as well as forward deployed air logistics support for the Navy and Marine Corps. (The original "Skytrain" was the World War II era C-47 developed from the civilian DC-3.) A C-9B was also chosen by NASA for reduced gravity research, replacing the aging KC-135 Vomit Comet.

The C-9B squadron (VR) were located throughout the continental U.S., with detachments operated in Europe, and Asia.

== Variants ==
- C-9A Nightingale - 21 aeromedical evacuation aircraft based on the DC-9-32CF for U.S. Air Force delivered during 1968–69. One was converted for executive transport and stationed at Chievres, Belgium; a second aircraft was converted for VIP transport by the 86th Airlift Wing at Ramstein Air Base.
- C-9B Skytrain II - 24 convertible passenger/transport versions of the DC-9-32CF for the U.S. Navy and Marine Corps delivered from 1973 to 1976. Five more C-9s were converted from passenger configured DC-9s.
- VC-9C - 3 executive transport aircraft for the U.S. Air Force; these were delivered in 1976 and served until 2011.
- C-9K - 2 aircraft for the Kuwait Air Force.

== Operators ==
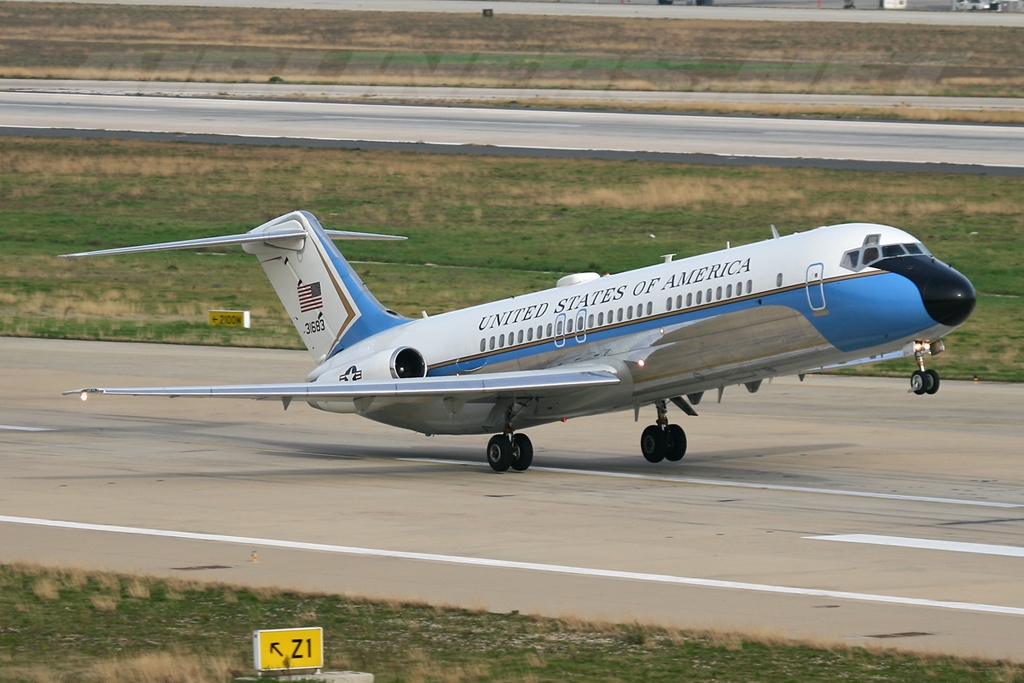
A US Air Force McDonnell Douglas VC-9C (DC-9-32), used often as Air Force Two or to transport first ladies

Kuwait

- Kuwait Air Force

United States

- United States Air Force
- United States Marine Corps
- United States Navy
- NASA

== Aircraft on display ==
- C-9A (AF serial number 67-22584) is the first C-9A accepted for the Military Airlift Command, and was additionally the first American jet aircraft specifically designed for medical evacuation. It is on display at the Air Mobility Command Museum at Dover Air Force Base, Delaware.
- C-9A (AF serial number 71-0877) is on display at Scott AFB, Illinois
- C-9A (AF serial number 71-0878) is on display in front of Wilford Hall USAF Medical Center at Lackland AFB, Texas
- VC-9C (AF serial number 73-1682) is on display at the Air Mobility Command Museum at Dover AFB, Delaware
- VC-9C (AF serial number 73-1681) is on display at the Castle Air Museum in Atwater, California and was used by Ronald Reagan and Bill Clinton
- VC-9C (AF serial number 73-1683) is on display at the Evergreen Aviation and Space Museum in McMinnville, Oregon
- C-9B (Navy 163511), last operated by VR-46 in Marietta, GA, is on display at Naval Aviation Museum in Pensacola, Florida
- C-9B (Navy 159120) is on display at the Pima Air & Space Museum in Tucson, Arizona
- C-9B (Navy 164607) is in storage at the Pima Air & Space Museum in Tucson, Arizona awaiting restoration

== Specifications (C-9B) ==
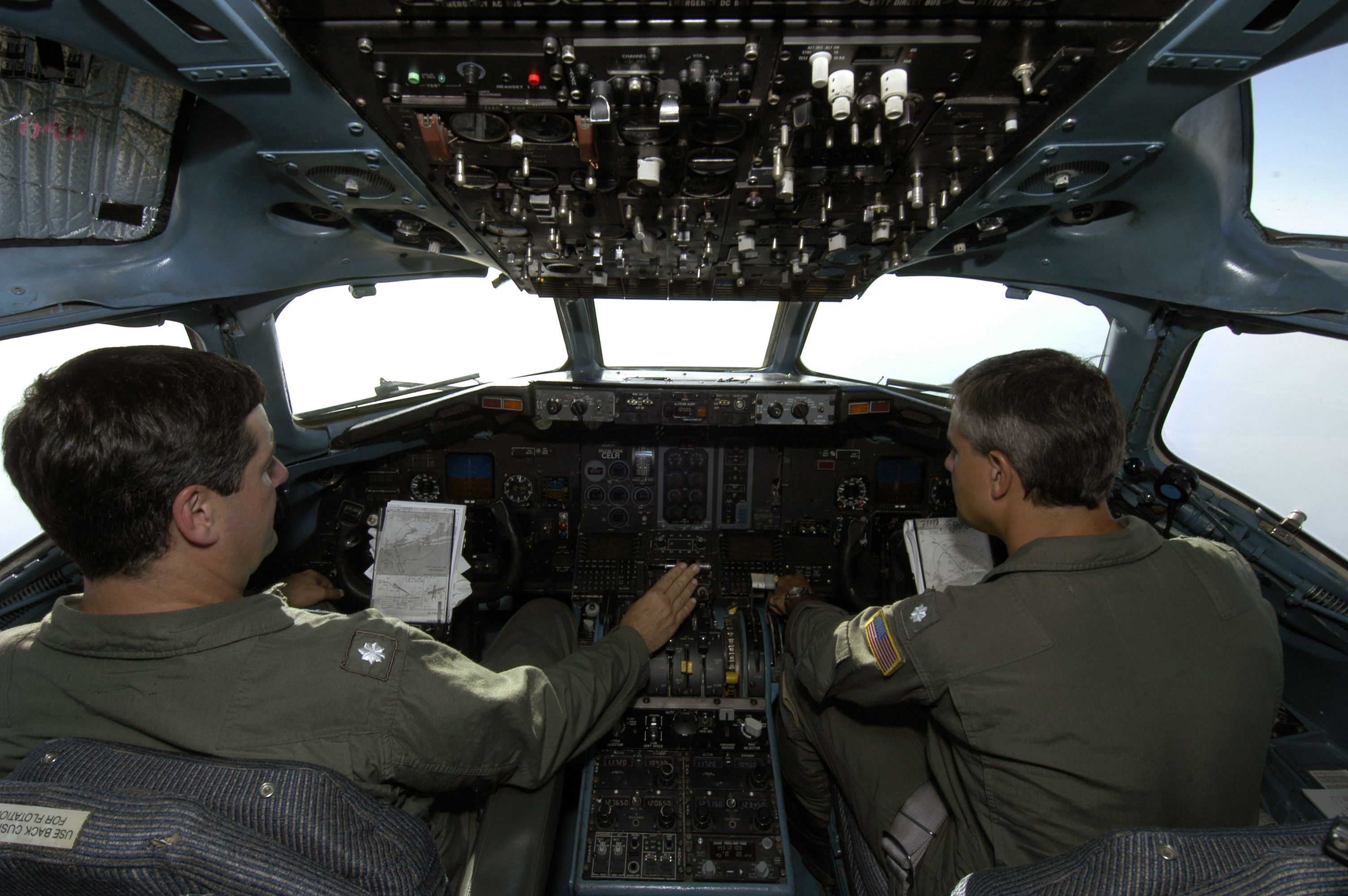
The cockpit of a C-9B Skytrain

Data from Encyclopedia of World Air Power

General characteristics

- Crew: 5 to 8
- Capacity: up to 76 pax
- Length: 119 ft 3 in (36.35 m)
- Wingspan: 93 ft 5 in (28.47 m)
- Height: 27 ft 6 in (8.38 m)
- Wing area: 1,001 sq ft (93.0 m^{2})
- Airfoil: root: DSMA-433A/-434A; tip: DSMA-435A/-436A
- Empty weight: 59,700 lb (27,079 kg)
- Max takeoff weight: 110,000 lb (49,895 kg)
- Powerplant: 2 × Pratt & Whitney JT8D-9 turbofan engines, 14,500 lbf (64 kN) thrust each

Performance

- Maximum speed: 500 kn (580 mph, 930 km/h)
- Maximum speed: Mach 0.84
- Cruise speed: 485 kn (558 mph, 898 km/h)
- Range: 2,520 nmi (2,900 mi, 4,670 km)
- Service ceiling: 37,000 ft (11,000 m)
- Rate of climb: 3,000 ft/min (15 m/s) +

Avionics

- Weather radar

== See also ==
- Military Airlift Command
- Military transport aircraft

Related development

- Boeing 717
- McDonnell Douglas DC-9
- McDonnell Douglas MD-80
- McDonnell Douglas MD-90

Aircraft of comparable role, configuration, and era

- Boeing C-40 Clipper
- Boeing CT-43

Related lists

- List of active United States military aircraft
- List of military aircraft of the United States
