= McChord Air Museum =

- Location within Washington (state)
- Established: July 1984
- Location: Lakewood, Washington
- Coordinates: 47.1215°N 122.4945°W
- Type: Military aviation museum
- Curator: Shon Zawada
- Website: mcchordairmuseum.org

The McChord Air Museum is an aviation museum located at McChord Field near Lakewood, Washington. The museum is broken up into three separate areas: the main gallery, located at the south end of McChord Field in Building 517; the Heritage Hill Airpark, which overlooks the McChord Field runway; and the aircraft restoration and maintenance facility in Building 301.

== History ==
Plans for a museum began around 1982, when the McChord Air Museum Foundation was established. By mid-1983, a B-18 had been transported to the museum, an F-106 at the base was expected to join the collection, and negiotiations were ongoing regarding the acquisition of a C-124. The museum opened to the public the following year in the 1,100 sq ft (100 m^{2}) Building 192.

Over a decade after the last aircraft left service, a C-124 was flown to the museum on 9 October 1986. The museum began moving to a larger building in 1989.

The C-124, along with a C-141 was moved to the newly established Heritage Park overlooking McChord Field's runway on 5 January 2005. An F-16 that responded to the September 11th attacks was planned to go on display at the museum in 2006, but shortly before it arrived the location was changed to the Western Air Defense Sector headquarters building.

In 2024, the museum acquired an artwork painted by Keith Ferris for the McChord Club in 1984.

== Exhibits ==
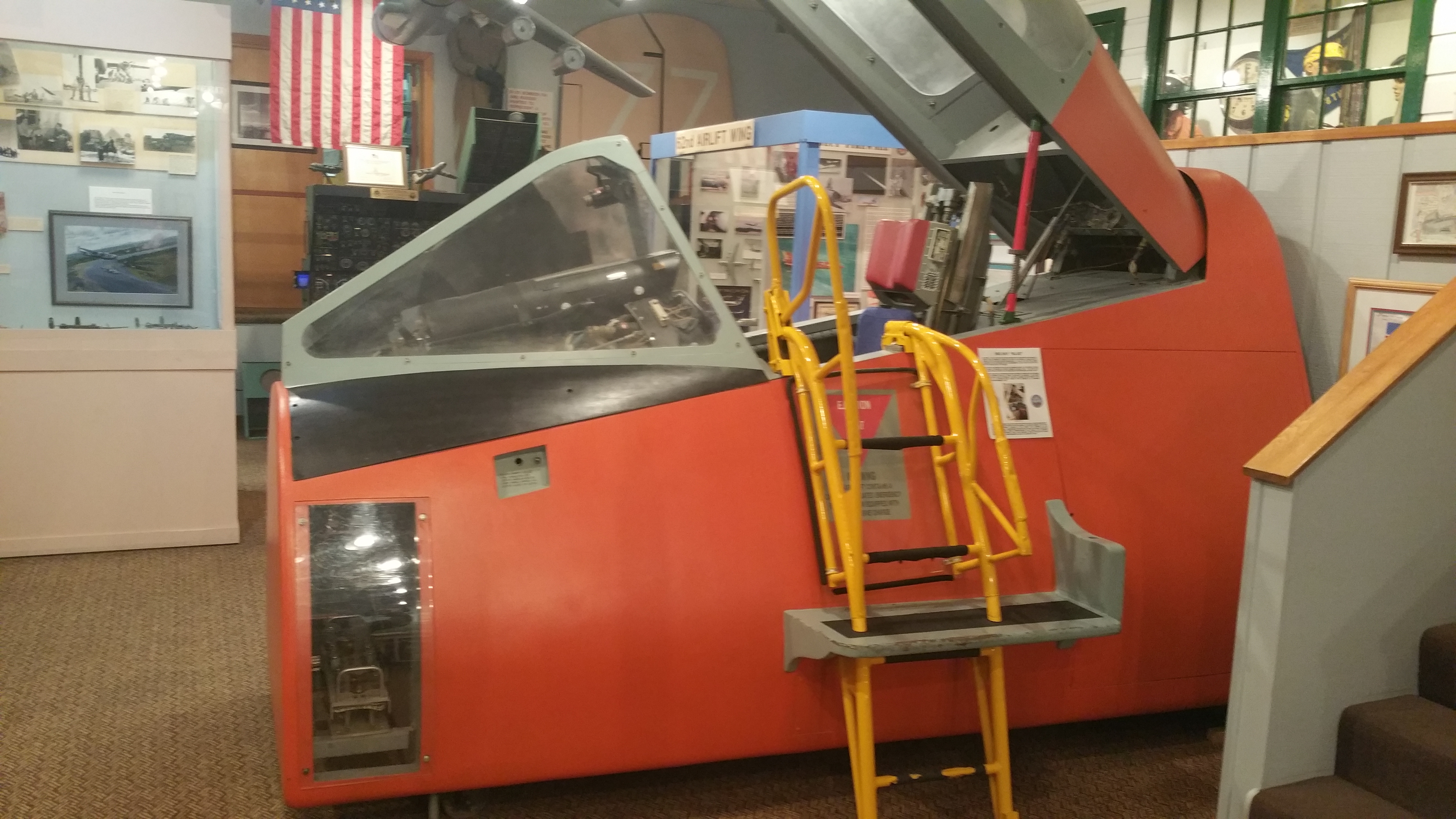
F-106 flight simulator

Exhibits at the museum include the former control tower of McChord Field, an F-106 simulator, and aviation artwork.

== Collection ==
- Beech UC-45J Expeditor
- Consolidated OA-10A Catalina
- Convair F-102A Delta Dagger
- Convair F-106A Delta Dart
- Douglas B-18A Bolo
- Douglas B-23 Dragon
- Douglas C-124C Globemaster II
- Douglas TC-47D Skytrain
- Fairchild C-82A Packet
- Fairchild Republic A-10A Thunderbolt II
- Kaman HH-43A Huskie
- Lockheed C-130E Hercules
- Lockheed C-141B Starlifter
- Lockheed T-33
- McDonnell CF-101F Voodoo
- McDonnell Douglas F-15A Eagle
- North American F-86D Sabre
- Sikorsky H-19 Chickasaw

== See also ==
- Malmstrom Museum
