= Malmstrom Museum =

- Location within Montana
- Established: 3 July 1982
- Location: Great Falls, Montana
- Coordinates: 47.5065°N 111.2000°W
- Type: Military aviation museum
- Founders: Dane H. Donnelly; Gerald Hanson; Bary Poletto
- Website: Official website (Archived)

The Malmstrom Museum is an aviation museum located at Malmstrom Air Force Base near Great Falls, Montana.

== History ==
The museum was dedicated on 3 July 1982, at the time being housed in two trailers previously used as classrooms on the base. In 1989 it received a P-63 restoration project from the New England Air Museum. The museum closed for renovations in 1996 and reopened two and a half years later in a larger building.

== Exhibits ==
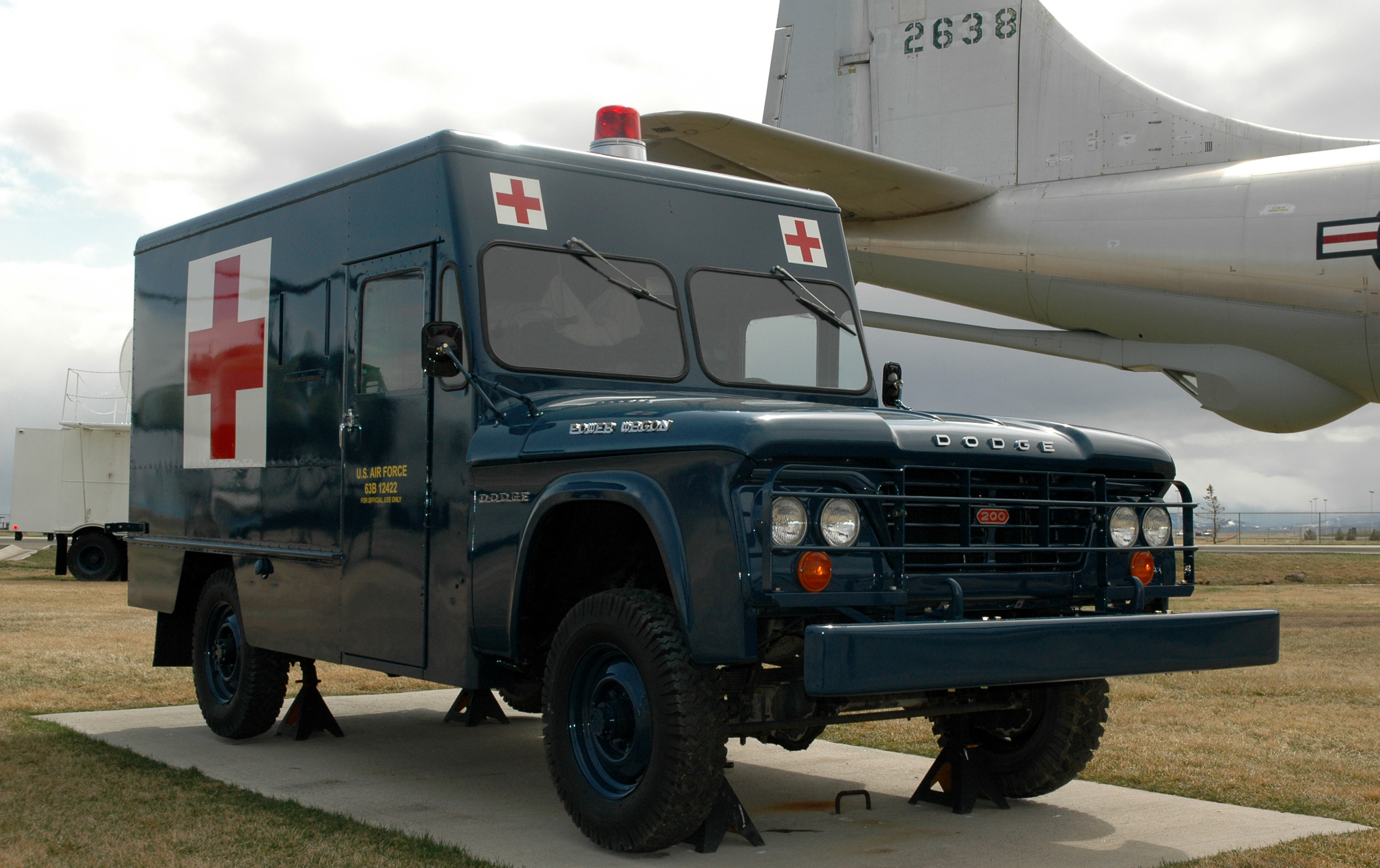
Dodge Power Wagon ambulance

Displays at the museum include a launch control center from a ballistic missile silo, a mockup of a World War II barracks, a model airplane collection, an AIR-2 missile, and a core memory element of a FSQ-7 computer.

On display outside are a totem pole, a LGM-30G missile, a missile transport vehicle, an MPS-9 radar trailer, a Dodge Power Wagon ambulance, a Peacekeeper armored vehicle, and a 1947 Ford.

== Collection ==
- Bell UH-1F Iroquois
- Boeing KC-97G Stratofreighter
- Lockheed T-33
- Martin B-57B Canberra
- McDonnell F-101F Voodoo
- North American TB-25M Mitchell
- Republic F-84F Thunderstreak

== See also ==
- McChord Air Museum
