= Minnesota Air National Guard Museum =

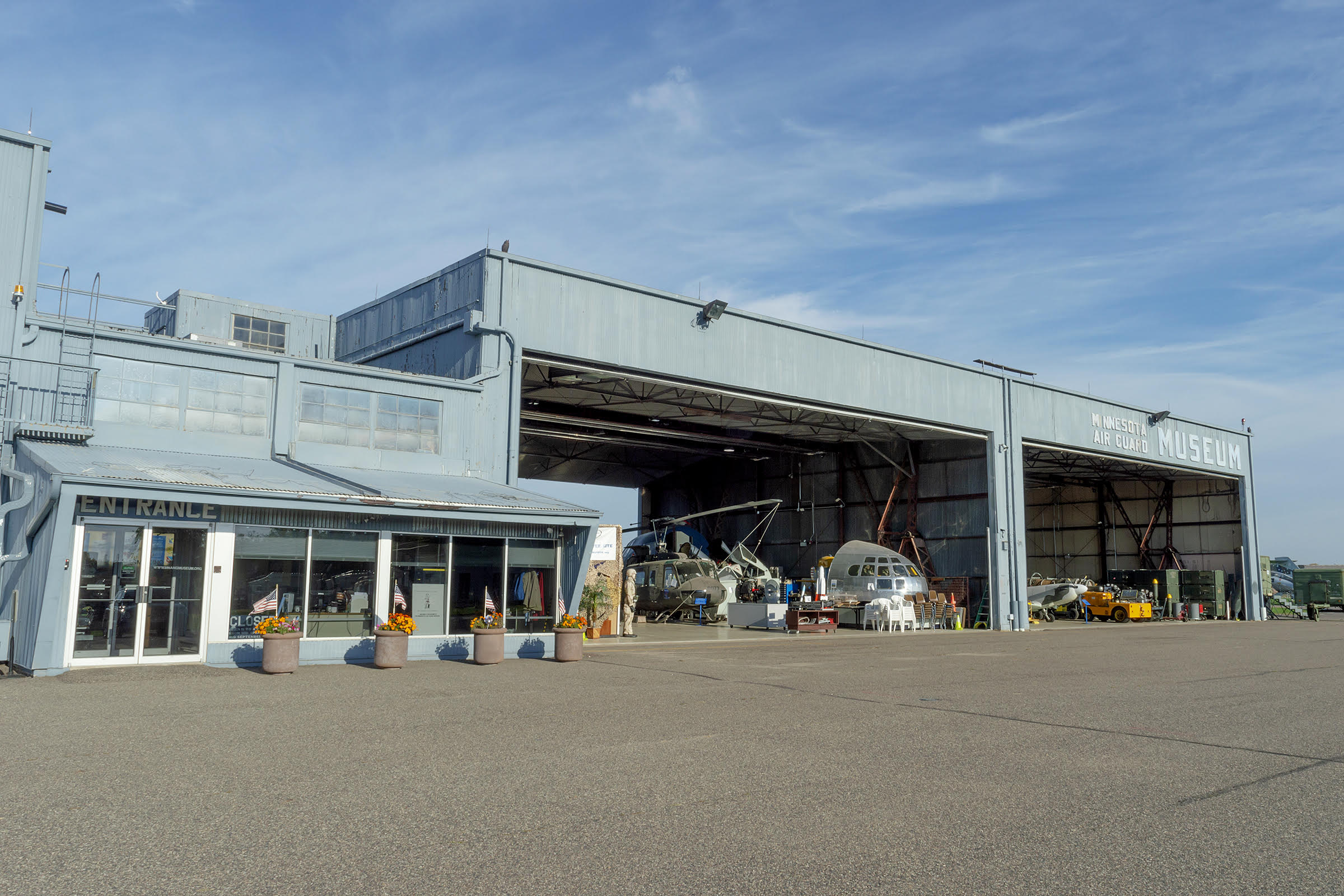
- Museum hangar

- Location within Minnesota
- Established: 22 July 1984
- Location: Fort Snelling, Minnesota
- Coordinates: 44.893°N 93.204°W
- Type: Military aviation museum
- Founders: Brig. Gen. Alfred C. Schwab, Jr.
- Website: mnangmuseum.org

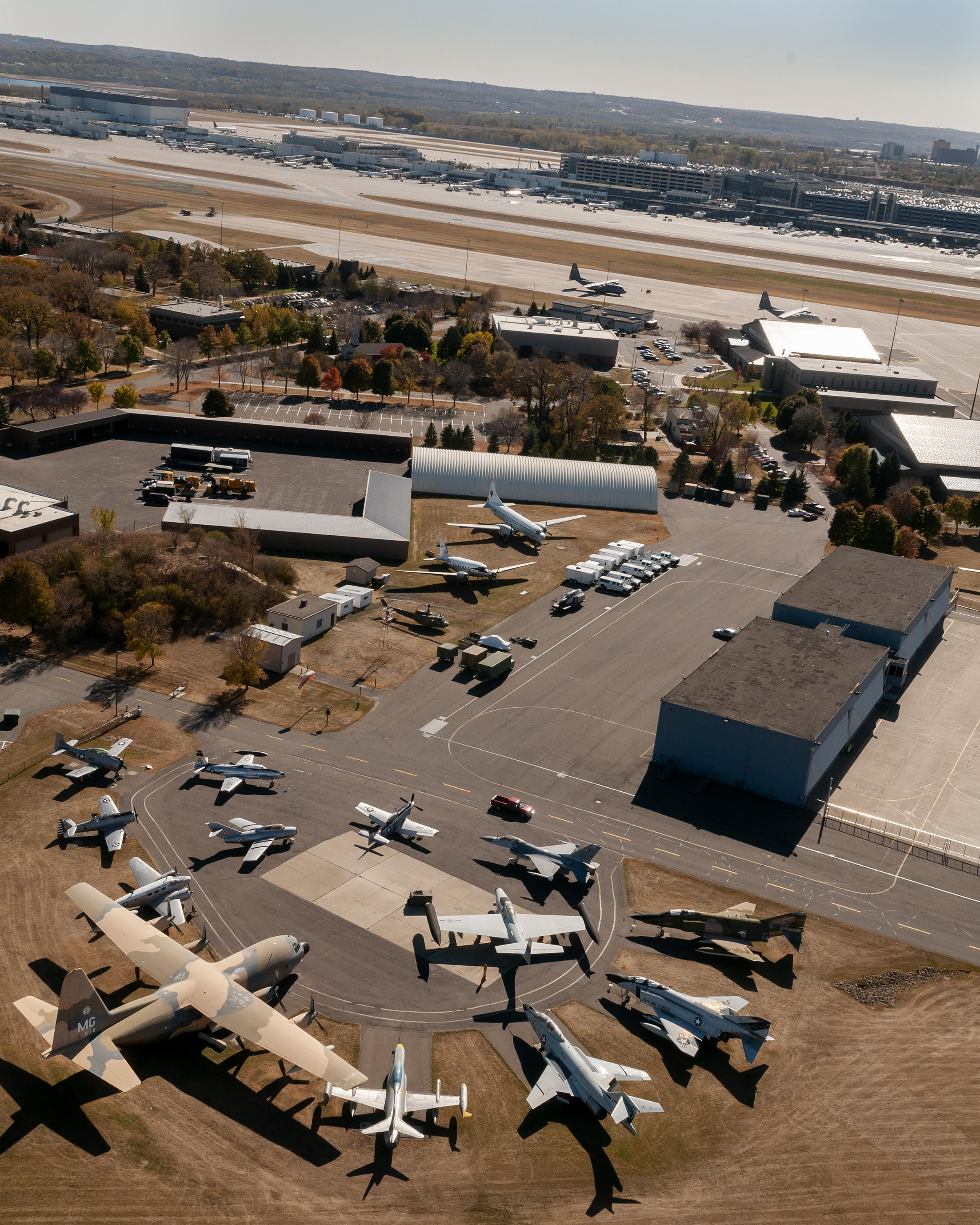
The museum's airpark

The Minnesota Air National Guard Museum is an aviation museum located at Minneapolis–Saint Paul Joint Air Reserve Station in Fort Snelling, Minnesota. It is dedicated to the history of the Minnesota Air National Guard.

== History ==
Founded by the 133rd Tactical Air Guard Historical Foundation in four former F-89 hangars and a two-story building, the museum was officially dedicated on 22 July 1984. However, it only opened to the public in April 1987. (Note: The same month a former Royal Canadian Air Force F-101, one of the last two flying, was placed on display.)

Following the September 11th attacks, the museum was forced to disassemble its main exhibit gallery and place it in storage. The hangars were used to host F-16s from the 179th Fighter Squadron for five months. After they vacated the building, the museum reopened in 2004.

A significant dispute arose in 2007 over the transfer of a Lockheed A-12 from the museum to the George Bush Center for Intelligence in Langley, Virginia. The museum had recovered the aircraft from California in 1990, but it was on loan from the National Museum of the United States Air Force. To satisfy the CIA's request, the latter argued that the former did not meet the requirements for museums in its loan program and it was the only available example that did not have a significant connection to its community. The Minnesota Air National Guard Museum countered that A-12s at other museums were better candidates for the transfer. Nevertheless, the aircraft was eventually moved to CIA headquarters. (Note: A few months after the disassembly, a T-28 was moved to the museum by helicopter.)

A Bell AH-1S Cobra at the museum was transferred to the U.S. Army Field Artillery Museum at Fort Sill, Oklahoma in March 2019.

== Collection ==
- Beechcraft C-45 Expeditor
- Bell UH-1H Iroquois
- Boeing C-97G Stratofreighter
- Convair C-131H Samaritan
- Convair F-102 Delta Dagger
- Curtiss JN-4H – replica
- Curtiss Oriole – replica (Note: Completed in 1995, this aircraft replaced another replica destroyed in a crash in 1970.)
- Douglas C-47 Skytrain
- General Dynamics F-16A Fighting Falcon
- Lockheed C-130A Hercules
- Lockheed F-94C Starfire
- Lockheed T-33A
- McDonnell F-4C Phantom II
- McDonnell F-101B Voodoo
- McDonnell RF-4C Phantom II
- Mikoyan-Gurevich MiG-15
- North American AT-6 Texan
- North American F-51 Mustang
- North American T-28 Trojan
- Northrop F-89H Scorpion
- Piper L-4 Grasshopper

== See also ==
- South Dakota Air and Space Museum
- List of aviation museums
