= S. K. Dey =

Indian politician (1906–1989)

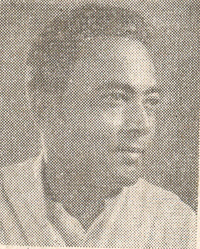
- Dey in 1962

Member of Parliament, Lok Sabha
- In office May 1962 – May 1967
- Preceded by: N K Somani
- Constituency: Nagaur

Member of Parliament, Rajya Sabha
- In office 31 January 1957 – 1 March 1962
- Preceded by: Surinder Kumar Dey

Personal details
- Born: Surinder Kumar Dey; 13 September 1906 Sylhet District, Bengal Presidency
- Died: 24 May 1989 (aged 82) New Delhi, India
- Profession: Politician, social engineer, author

Surendra Kumar Dey (13 September 1906 – 24 May 1989) was an Indian politician, administrator, and author who served as the first Union Cabinet Minister for Community Development, Panchayati raj, and Cooperation. He held positions in both houses of Indian Parliament: Rajya Sabha (1957–1962) and Lok Sabha (1962–1967).

He was involved in government initiatives related to the Panchayati Raj system, a governance model emphasizing decentralization at village level.

== Early life ==
Dey was born on 13 September 1906, in the Sylhet District of the Bengal Presidency, present-day Bangladesh. He studied engineering at Purdue University and the University of Michigan in the United States.

== Career ==
Dey began his career as the Honorary Technical Advisor to the Government of India's Ministry of Rehabilitation from 1948 to 1951. During his time as a technical advisor, he worked on rehabilitation efforts for displaced persons from Pakistan following the Partition of British India.

=== Ministerial tenure ===
He was appointed Minister for Cooperation & Panchayati Raj under Prime Minister Jawaharlal Nehru. He implemented the Community Development Program (1953), which led to the creation of Community Development Blocks across the country.

He was a member of the Balwant Rai Mehta Committee (1957), which recommended the formation of a three-tier Panchayati Raj system in India.

=== Rural township ===
In 1949, Dey proposed the idea of an agro-industrial township for rural development. The model combined agriculture and industrial activities, with the township receiving support through goods and services from surrounding villages. It was designed as a cooperative and largely self-sufficient system.

This model materialized as the Mazdoori Manzil project in 1950, in Nilokheri, Haryana, and was designed to rehabilitate 7,000 refugees from Pakistan.

After observing the Nilokheri model, Prime Minister Nehru suggested that similar townships be replicated throughout India.

Dey was influenced by Rabindranath Tagore's Sriniketan experiment in rural development and the Gandhian idea of rural construction, which stressed self-sufficiency and manual labour. His ideas combined aspects of Liberalism, Marxism, and Gandhism.

== Panchayati Raj ==
Dey served on the 1957 Balwant Rai Mehta Committee, which was formed to assess the Community Development Program. The committee examined the program's effectiveness in mobilizing local initiatives and building institutions capable of sustaining rural economic and social development. It concluded that community development was effective only when local communities actively participated in planning, decision-making, and implementation, thereby emphasizing the need for a strong Panchayati Raj system. The Balwant Rai Mehta Committee recommended a developmental role for Panchayati Raj institutions in rural development, considering them essential to the success of community development and national extension programs.

Dey attributed philosophical connotations to Panchayati Raj, which he explained in his book Panchayat-i-Raj: A Synthesis. In his book, Dey described Panchayati Raj as a connecting mechanism between local and national governance, advocating an integrated approach linking the Gram Sabha and the Lok Sabha and stating that democratic processes should extend from Parliament to the village assembly. Dey urged state governments to prioritize establishing PRIs in their respective states.

Dey's support for decentralized governance coincided with a period when political and administrative support for the institutionalization of Panchayati Raj increased. The recommendations of the Balwant Rai Mehta Committee preceded legislative action by state governments to establish Panchayati Raj Institutions more systematically.

By the 1960s, all states had enacted legislation for PRIs (Panchayati Raj Institutions), leading to the establishment of over 217,300 Panchayats.

=== Other achievements ===
Dey was involved in establishing the National Development Council and guided Kurukshetra, a publication of the Ministry of Rural Development.

Dey published Community Development: The Quest in 1960.
