= Beechcraft Model 18 =

American twin-engine, light aircraft produced 1937–1970

Model 18
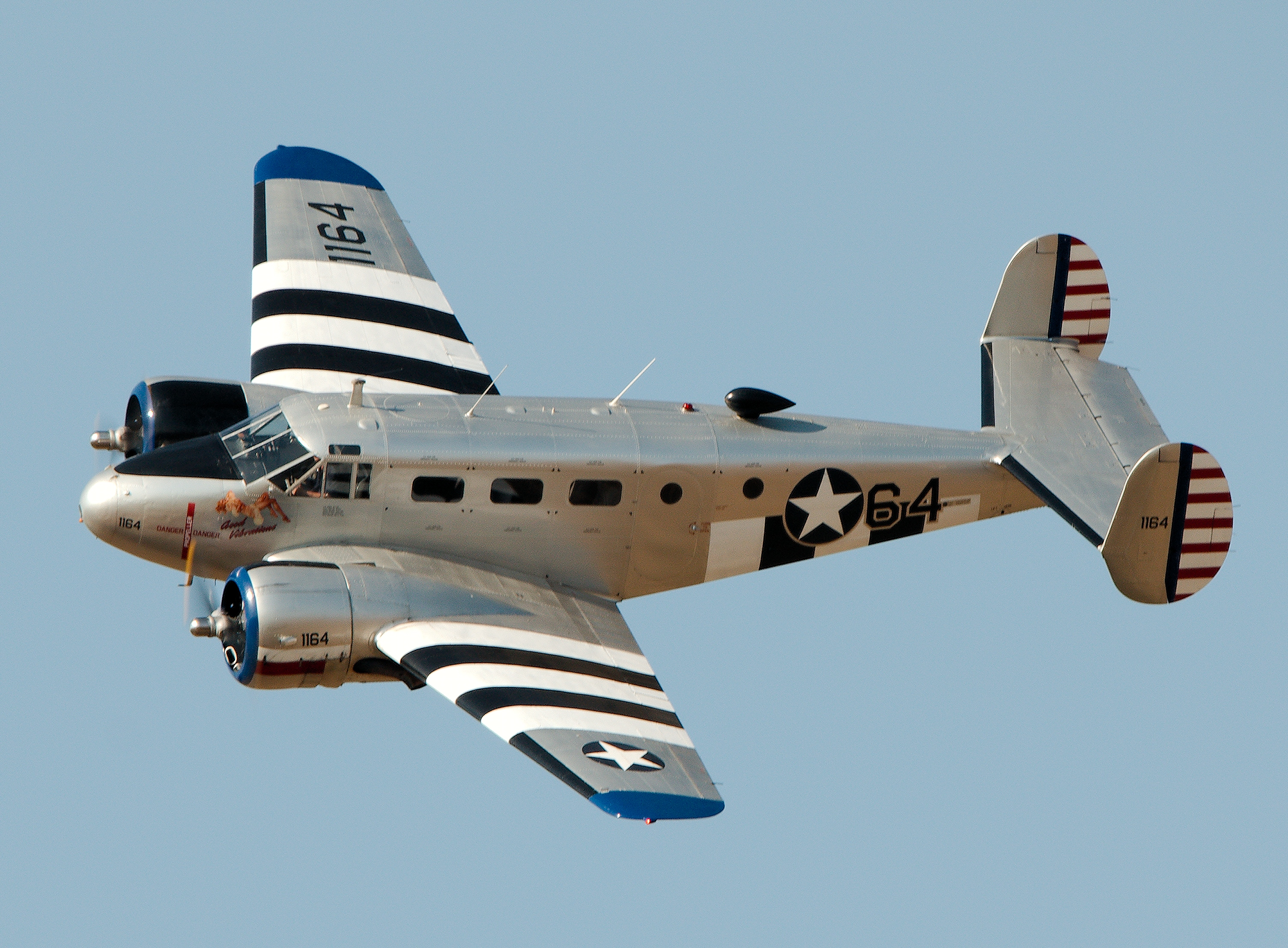
- Ex RCAF Beech Expeditor 3TM, restored with USAAC markings, in 2019

General information
- Type: Trainer, transport aircraft and utility aircraft
- National origin: United States
- Manufacturer: Beech Aircraft Corporation
- Status: In service
- Primary users: United States Army Air Forces United States Navy; Royal Air Force; Royal Canadian Air Force
- Number built: 9,000+

History
- Manufactured: 1937–1970
- Introduction date: 1937
- First flight: 15 January 1937

The Beechcraft Model 18 (or "Twin Beech", as it is also known) is a 6- to 11-seat, twin-engined, low-wing, tailwheel light aircraft designed and manufactured by the Beech Aircraft Corporation of Wichita, Kansas. Continuously produced from 1937 to November 1969 (over 32 years, a world record at the time), over 9,000 aircraft were built, making the Model 18 one of the world's most widely used light aircraft. It was sold worldwide as a civilian executive, utility, cargo aircraft, and passenger airliner on tailwheels, nosewheels, skis, or floats, and also saw use as a military aircraft.

The Model 18 was developed during the mid-to-late 1930s, primarily as a compact business aircraft and regional airliner. The prototype made its maiden flight on 15 January 1937 and gained type certification only seven weeks later. During and after World War II, over 4,500 Beech 18s were used for various military purposes, including as a light transport, light bomber (for China), aircrew trainer (for bombing, navigation, and gunnery), photo reconnaissance, and "mother ship" for target drones—including United States Army Air Forces (USAAF) C-45 Expeditor, AT-7 Navigator, and AT-11 Kansan; and United States Navy (USN) UC-45J Navigator, SNB-1 Kansan, and others. In World War II, over 90 percent of USAAF bombardiers and navigators were trained in these aircraft.

Production of the type for military purposes ended shortly after the end of World War II, the company transitioning entirely onto civil production by October 1945. During the early post-war era, the Beech 18 was the pre-eminent "business aircraft" and "feeder airliner". Besides carrying passengers, its civilian applications included aerial spraying, sterile insect release, fish stocking, dry-ice cloud seeding, aerial firefighting, airmail delivery, ambulance service, numerous movie productions, skydiving, freight, weapon- and drug-smuggling, engine testbed, skywriting, banner towing, and stunt aircraft. Many Model 18s are privately owned, around the world, with 240 aircraft in the U.S. still on the Federal Aviation Administration Aircraft Registry in August 2017.

== Design and development ==
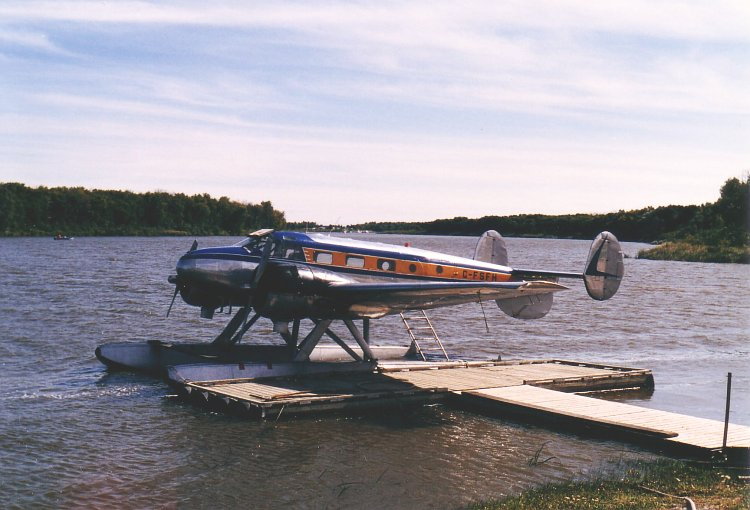
Beech 18 on floats in Manitoba, 1986

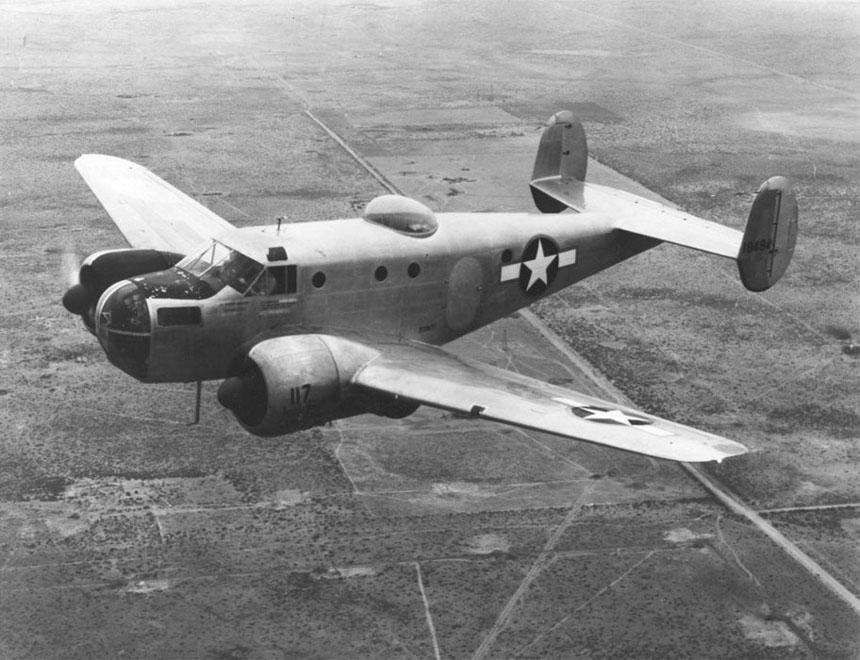
Beechcraft AT-11 over the West Texas prairies, around 1944

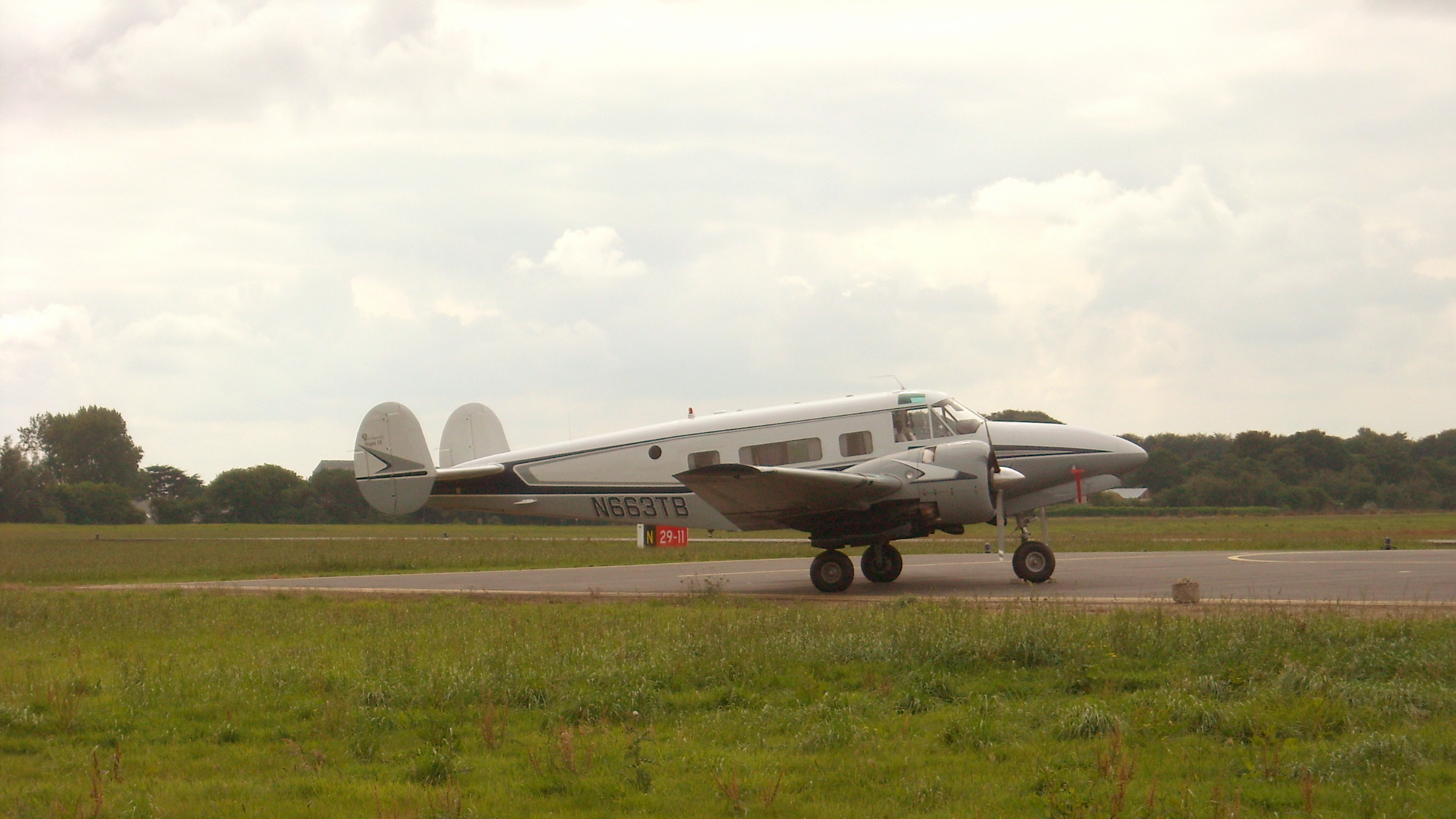
Private Beech H18 with the optional tricycle undercarriage visiting Lannion, France

During the mid 1930s, Beechcraft management speculated that sufficient demand would exist for a new design, referred to as the Model 18. It was envisioned as a twin-engine transport aircraft, capable of seating between six and eight passengers dependent upon configuration, that would be suitable both as a business aircraft and a small regional airliner, the latter being viewed as a relatively small niche of the market due to few feeder lines existing at that time. Furthermore, the Model 18 would be designed so that it could be readily converted to be used for several military applications as well as to haul cargo. The decisions to proceed was issued in late 1935 and preliminary works commenced thereafter, which was headed by aeronautical engineer Theodore Wells. To accommodate the anticipated volume, the company's main production facilities were expanded around this time.

The design team investigated several different airfoils, which included a series of wind tunnel tests performed at Wichita State University, before selecting the 23000 series airfoil developed by the National Advisory Committee for Aeronautics, which possessed acceptable lift-drag profile when flying at low airspeeds and produced relatively safe stall characteristics. Furthermore, the wingroot featured an angle of incidence that progressively lessened toward the wingtips in combination with a gentle twist to the chord between the root and the wingtip that produced a smooth airflow over the ailerons (thereby retaining roll control during stalls), achieving acceptable aerodynamic performance during both landings and take-offs. The wings were furnished with electrically actuated flaps; the retraction mechanism for the undercarriage was also electrically actuated.

The resulting aircraft was fairly conventional for the era, including twin radial engines and all-metal semimonocoque construction. The flight control surfaces, such as the ailerons, elevator and rudders, were composed of aluminum alloy but covered in cotton fabric. One of the less conventional features of the aircraft was its twin-tailfin configuration. While typically outfitted with a tailwheel undercarriage, it could be interchangeably equipped with either skis or float-landing gear. The Model 18 can be mistaken for the larger Lockheed Electra series of airliners, which closely resemble it.

On 5 January 1937, the Model 18 prototype made its maiden flight from the company's facility in Wichita, Kansas; its construction had begun 13 months earlier. For the subsequent flight test programme, experienced personnel were borrowed from the airline Transcontinental and Western Air. On 4 March of that same year, it received type certification, clearing the aircraft to enter civil service, although only six production standard aircraft would be produced that year and deliveries would not commence until 1938. Following the completion of flight testing, Walter Beech personally flew the prototype on numerous demonstration flights; it performed a tour across both the United States and Canada as part of publicity efforts with the goal of driving sales of the type.

Early orders for the type typically came from charter airlines, including those based overseas, as well as a few corporations seeking executive aircraft. Furthermore, as early as January 1939, the US government took an interest in the type, initially to perform photo reconnaissance. Throughout World War II, military orders for the type took precedence over the company's commercial activities. Shortly after the Surrender of Japan, which ended the conflict, military production ceased. Beechcraft transitioned back to full-rate commercial aircraft production by October 1945. Numerous refinements and improvements were incorporated around this time, including revised landing gear, brakes, and tires that, in conjunction with other structural modifications, increased the aircraft's maximum weight capacity.

Early production aircraft were powered either by a pair of 330-hp (250-kW) Jacobs L-6s or 350-hp (260-kW) Wright R-760Es; at the time, these were the only engines available that satisfied the designer's requirements. Many aircraft, such as the D18S variant, were powered by two 450-hp (336-kW) Pratt & Whitney R-985 "Wasp Junior" nine-cylinder radial engines, paired with Hamilton Standard constant speed propellers. The Model 18 has used a variety of engines and has been subject to a number of airframe modifications to increase both gross weight and speed. At least one aircraft was modified to use 600-hp (447-kW) Pratt & Whitney R-1340 "Wasp" powerplants. With the added weight of about 200 lb (91 kg) per engine, the concept of a Model 18 fitted with R-1340 engines was deemed unsatisfactory due to the weakest structural area of the aircraft being the engine mounts.

On 10 December 1953, the prototype of the improved Super 18 made its first flight. In 1955, deliveries of the Model E18S commenced; the E18S featured a fuselage that was extended 6 in (150 mm) higher for more headroom in the passenger cabin. All later Beech 18s (sometimes called Super 18s) featured this taller fuselage, and some earlier models (including one AT-11) have had this modification. The Model H18, introduced in 1963, featured optional tricycle undercarriage. Unusually, the undercarriage was developed for earlier-model aircraft under an supplemental type certificate by Volpar, and installed in H18s at the factory during manufacture. A total of 109 H18s was built with tricycle undercarriage, and another 240 earlier-model aircraft were modified with this.

In November 1969, production of the Model 18 came to an end; the final aircraft, a Model H18, was delivered to Miyazaki Aviation College, Japan, that same year. Through the years, 32 variations of the basic design had flown, over 200 improvement modification kits were developed, and almost 8,000 aircraft were built. In one case, the aircraft was modified to a triple tail, trigear, humpbacked configuration and appeared similar to a miniature Lockheed Constellation. Another distinctive conversion was carried out by Pacific Airmotive to become the PacAero Tradewind, which featured a lengthened nose to accommodate the tricycle nosewheel, and replaced the Model 18's twin tailfins with a single fin arrangement.

== Operational history ==
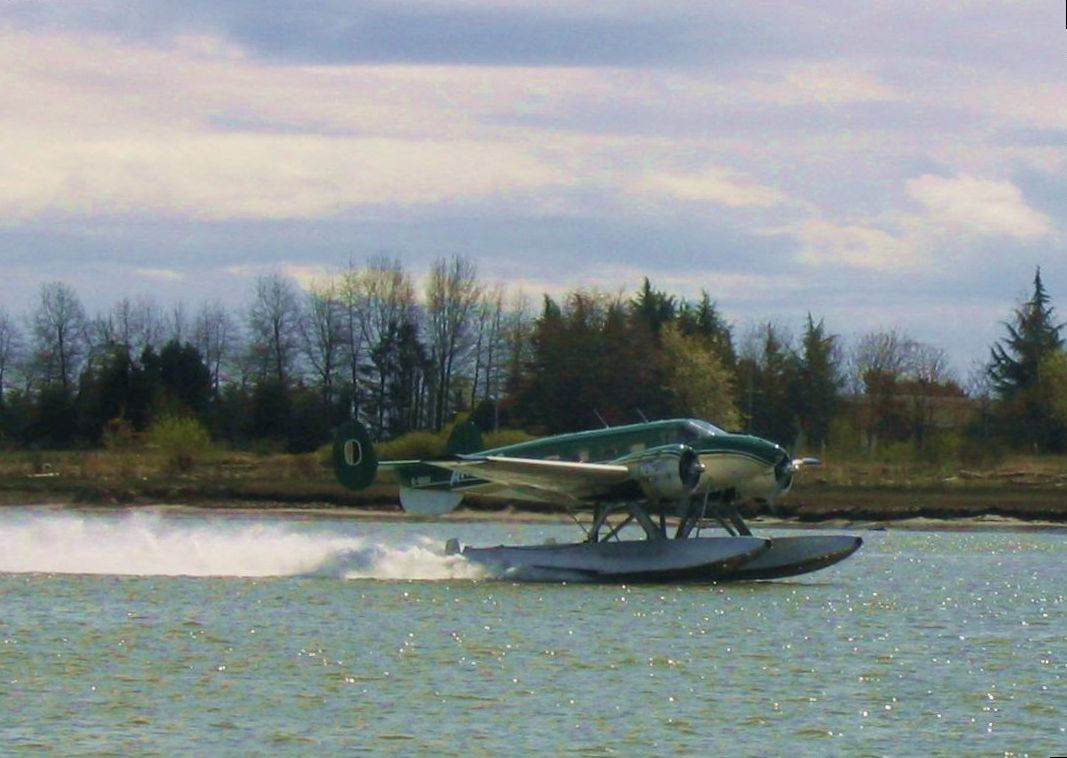
Beechcraft 18 on floats

Production got an early boost when Nationalist China paid the company US$750,000 for six M18R light bombers, but by the time of the U.S. entry into World War II, only 39 Model 18s had been sold, of which 29 were for civilian customers. Work began in earnest on a variant specifically for training United States Army Air Forces (USAAF) military pilots, bombardiers, and navigators. The effort resulted in the Army AT-7. Further development led to the AT-11 navigation trainer, C-45 military transport, and F-2 (the "F" standing for "Fotorecon", short for "photographic reconnaissance"). The United States Navy (USN) first adopted the Beech 18 as the JRB-1, equivalent to the F-2, followed by the JRB-2 transport; the JRB was initially named the Voyager, but this name did not enter common use, and JRBs were generally called Expeditors like their USAAF counterparts. The first JRB-1 obtained by the USN, bureau number (BuNo) 09771, was converted from the last civilian Model 18 built before production was earmarked solely for the military for the duration of the war. The USN subsequently obtained more Model 18s as the JRB-3 (C-45B), JRB-4 (UC-45F), SNB-1 Kansan (AT-11), SNB-2 (AT-7), and SNB-2C (AT-7C). Existing naval Twin Beeches were subsequently modified into the SNB-2H air ambulance, SNB-2P reconnaissance trainer, and SNB-3Q electronic countermeasures trainer. The United States Coast Guard acquired seven JRB-4 and JRB-5 aircraft from the USN between 1943 and 1947; they were primarily used as utility transports, with one aircraft later converted for aerial mapping and another used for proficiency flying.

After the conflict, the USAAF was reorganised into the United States Air Force (USAF), and its Strategic Air Command had Model 18 variants (AT-11 Kansans, C-45 Expeditors, F-2 Expeditors, and UC-45 Expeditors) from 1946 until 1951. In 1950, the USN still had around 1,200 JRB and SNB aircraft in inventory. From 1951 to 1955, the USAF had many of its aircraft remanufactured with new fuselages, wing center sections, and undercarriages to take advantage of the improvements to the civilian models since the end of World War II. Eventually, 900 aircraft were remanufactured to be similar to the then-current Model D18S and given new designations, constructor's numbers, and USAF serial numbers. The USN had many of its surviving aircraft remanufactured, as well, resulting in the JRB-6, SNB-5, and SNB-5P. The Coast Guard retired its JRBs in 1956 and sold most of them as surplus in 1959, but one was retained by the United States Coast Guard Reserve until at least 1972. With the adoption of the 1962 United States Tri-Service aircraft designation system, the USN's SNB-5 and SNB-5P became the TC-45J and RC-45J, respectively, later becoming the UC-45J as their primary mission shifted from aircrew training to utility transport work. The C-45 flew in USAF service until 1963, the USN retired its last UC-45J in 1972, while the U.S. Army flew its C-45s until 1976. In later years, the military called these aircraft "bug smashers" in reference to their extensive use supplying mandatory flight hours for desk-bound aviators in the Pentagon.

Beech 18s were used extensively by Air America during the Vietnam War; initially more-or-less standard ex-military C-45 examples were used, but then the airline had 12 aircraft modified by Conrad Conversions in 1963 and 1964 to increase performance and payload. The modified aircraft were known as Conrad Ten-Twos, as the maximum takeoff weight (MTOW) was increased to 10,200 lb (4,600 kg). The increase was achieved by several airframe modifications, including increased horizontal stabilizer angle-of-incidence, redesigned undercarriage doors, and aerodynamically improved wingtips. Air America then had Volpar convert 14 aircraft to turboprop power, fitted with Garrett AiResearch TPE-331 engines; modified aircraft were called Volpar Turbo Beeches, and also had a further increase in MTOW to 10,286 lb (4,666 kg).

=== Spar problems ===
The wing spar of the Model 18 was fabricated by welding an assembly of tubular steel. The configuration of the tubes in combination with drilled holes from aftermarket supplemental type certificate (STC) modifications on some of these aircraft have allowed the spar to become susceptible to corrosion and cracking while in service. This prompted the FAA to issue an Airworthiness Directive in 1975, mandating the fitting of a spar strap to some Model 18s. This led, in turn, to the retirement of a large number of STC-modified Model 18s when owners determined the aircraft were worth less than the cost of the modifications. The corrosion on unmodified spars was not a problem; it occurred due to the additional exposed surface area created through the STC hole-drilling process. Further requirements have been mandated by the FAA and other national airworthiness authorities, including regular removal of the spar strap to allow the strap to be checked for cracks and corrosion and the spar to be X-rayed. In Australia, the airworthiness authority has placed a life limit on the airframe, beyond which aircraft are not allowed to fly.

== Variants ==
=== Manufacturer models ===
Unless otherwise noted, the engines fitted are Pratt & Whitney R-985 radials.

Model 18A
First production model with seating for two pilots and seven or eight passengers, fitted with Wright R-760E-2 engines of 350 horsepower (260 kW), MTOW: 6,700 lb (3,000 kg) Four built.

- Model S18A

Version of Model 18A capable of being fitted with skis or Edo 55-7170 floats; MTOW: 7,200 lb (3,300 kg)

Model A18A
Version fitted with Wright R-760E-2 engines, MTOW: 7,500 lb (3,400 kg)

- Model SA18A

Seaplane version of Model A18A, MTOW: 7,170 lb (3,250 kg)

Model 18B
Version powered with 285 hp (213 kW) Jacobs L-5 engines. Four built.

- Model S18B

Version of Model 18B capable of being fitted with skis or floats.

Model 18D
Variant with seating for two pilots and nine passengers, fitted with Jacobs L-6 engines of 330 horsepower (250 kW), MTOW: 7,200 lb (3,300 kg). Twelve aircraft built.

- Model S18D

Version of Model 18D capable of being fitted with skis or Edo 55-7170 floats, MTOW: 7,170 lb (3,250 kg)

Model A18D
Variant of 18D with MTOW increased by 300 lb (140 kg) to 7,500 lb (3,400 kg).

- Model SA18D

Seaplane version of Model A18D, but same MTOW as S18D

Model 18R
Model with Pratt and Whitney R-985-A1 engines with dual-stage blower for increased power at higher operating altitudes, 420 horsepower (310 kW), seven built, one to Sweden as an air ambulance, six to Nationalist China as M18R light bombers

Model 18S
Nine-passenger pre-World War II civil variant, powered by 450 hp (340 kW) served as basis for USAAF C-45C

Model B18S
Nine-passenger pre-World War II civil variant, served as basis for USAAF F-2

Model C18S
Variant of B18S with seating for eight passengers, and equipment and minor structural changes

Model D18S
First post-World War II variant introduced in 1945, with seating for eight passengers and MTOW of 8,750 lb (3,970 kg), 1,035 built

Model D18C
Variant with Continental R9-A engines of 525 horsepower (391 kW) and MTOW of 9,000 lb (4,100 kg), introduced in 1947, 31 built.

Model E18S

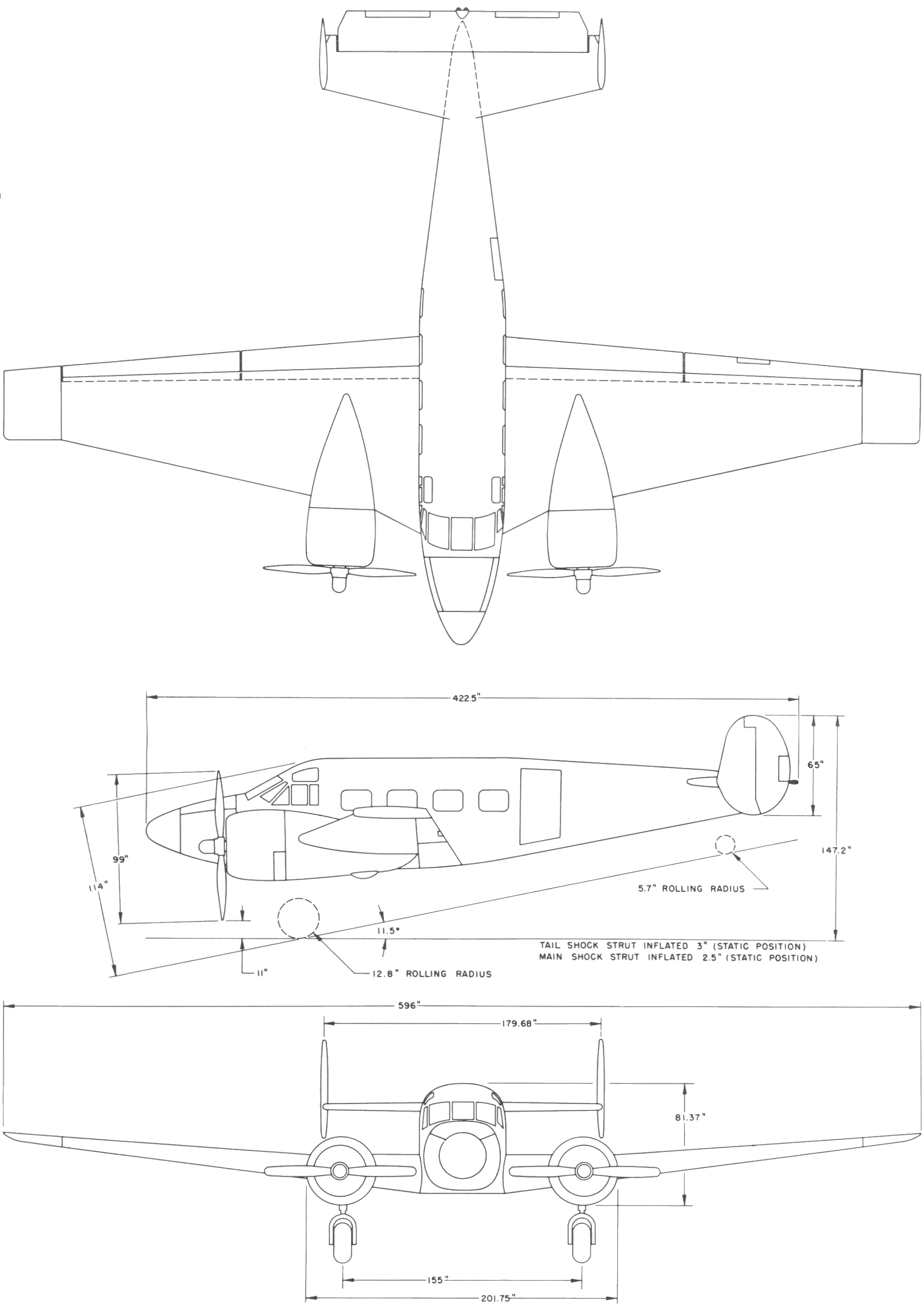
A 3-view line drawing of a Model E18S

Variant with redesigned wing and MTOW of 9,300 lb (4,200 kg); 403 built

Model E18S-9700
Variant of E18S with MTOW of 9,700 lb (4,400 kg); 57 built

Model G18S

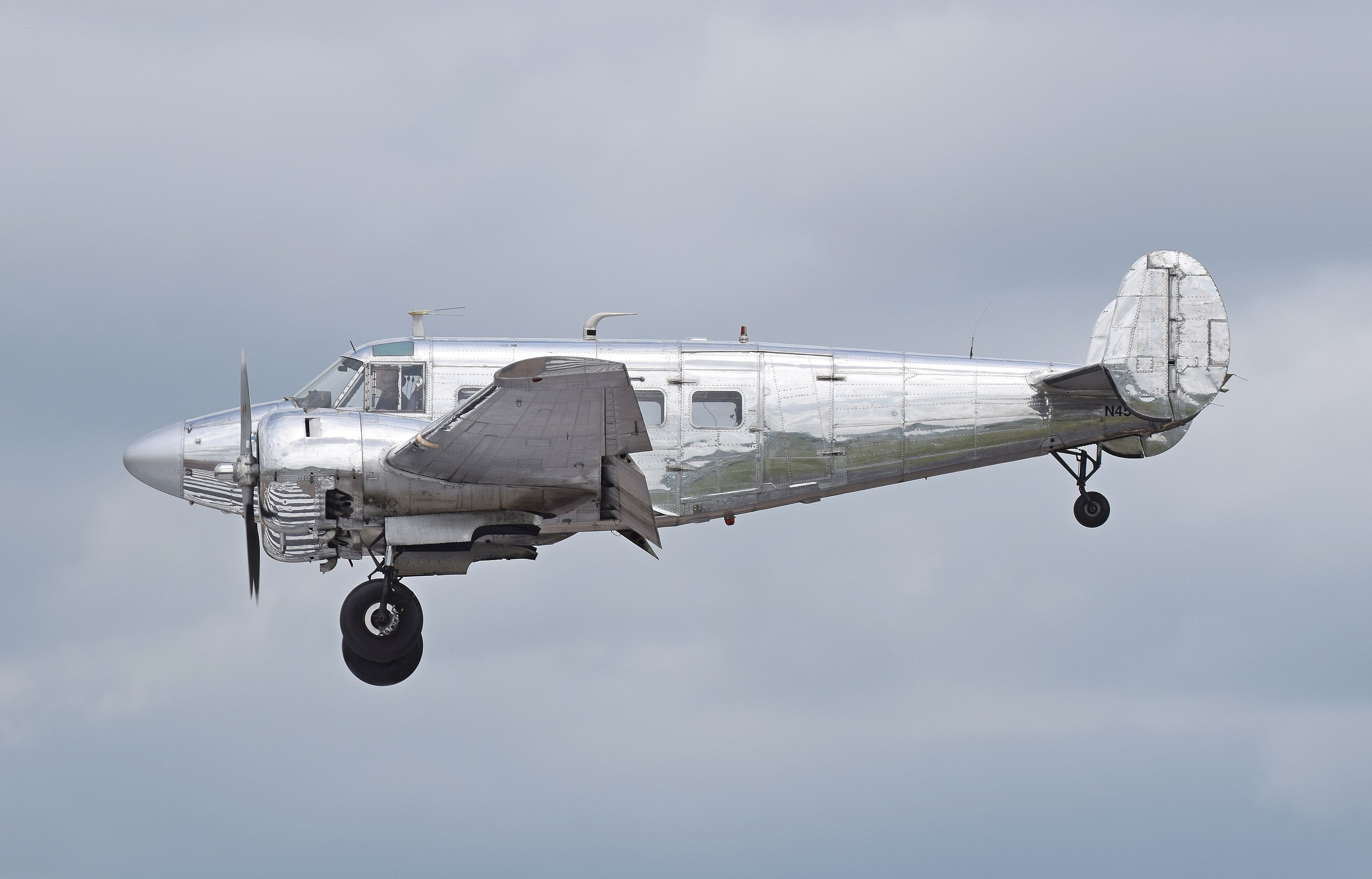
A Model G18S arriving at the 2016 RIAT, England

Superseded E18S, MTOW of 9,700 lb (4,400 kg); 155 built

Model G18S-9150
Lightweight version of G18, MTOW of 9,150 lb (4,150 kg); one built

Model H18
Last production version, fitted with optional tricycle undercarriage developed by Volpar and MTOW of 9,900 lb (4,500 kg); 149 built, of which 109 were manufactured with tricycle undercarriage

=== Military versions ===
==== USAAC/USAAF designations ====
C-45
Six-seat staff transport based on C18S; 11 built

C-45A
Eight-seat utility transport based on C18S; 20 built

RC-45A
Redesignation of all surviving F-2, F-2A, and F-2B aircraft by the USAF in 1948

C-45B
Based on C18S, but with modified internal layout; 223 ordered, redesignated UC-45B in 1943 Equipped with a hatch in the cabin door for aerial photography.

C-45C
Two Model 18S aircraft impressed into the USAAF, redesignated UC-45C in January 1943

C-45D
Designation given to two AT-7 aircraft converted as passenger transports during manufacture, redesignated UC-45D in January 1943

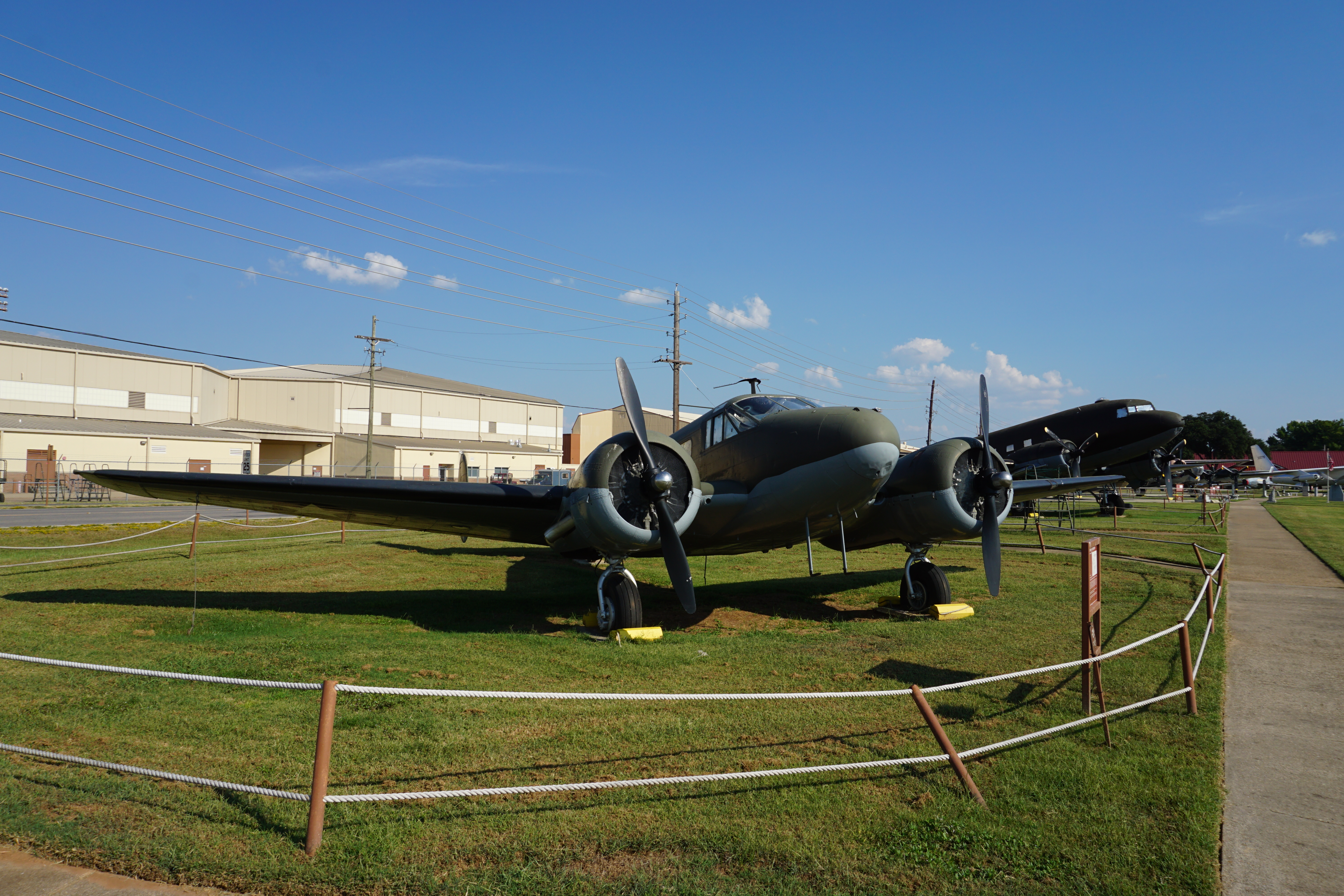
C-45F at the Barksdale Global Power Museum

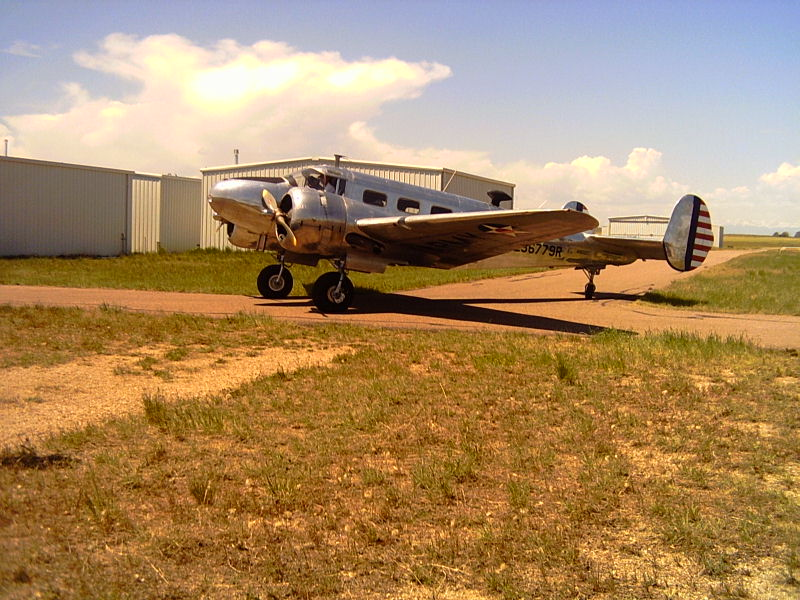
C-45H/AT-7 CAF, Platte Valley Airpark, Hudson, Colorado, June 2007

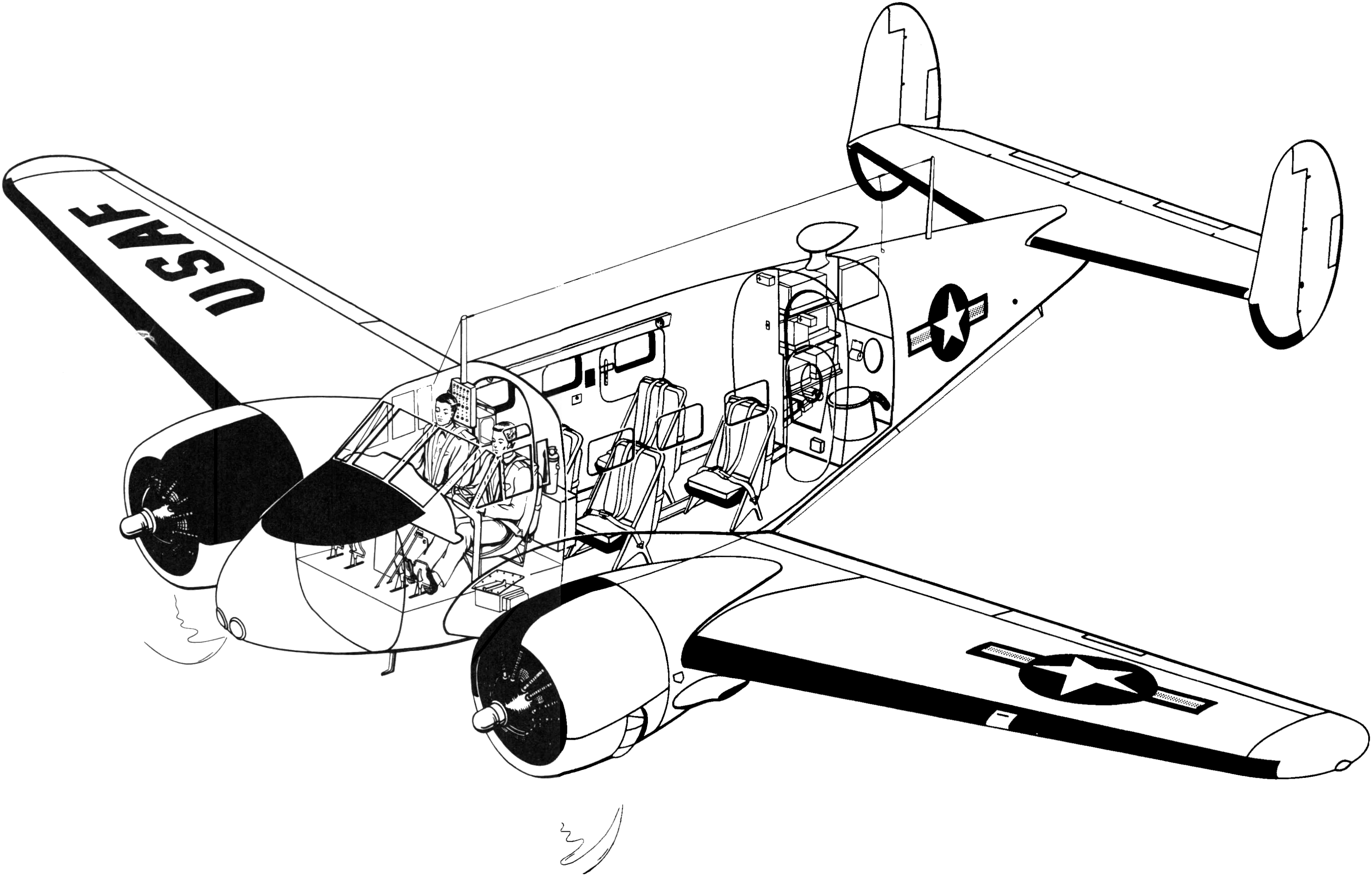
A cutaway view of a C-45H

C-45E
Designation given to two AT-7 and four AT-7B aircraft converted as passenger transports during manufacture, redesignated UC-45E in January 1943

C-45F
Standardized seven-seat version based on C18S, with longer nose than preceding models; 1,137 ordered, redesignated UC-45F

C-45G
AT-7s and AT-11s remanufactured in the early 1950s for the USAF to similar standard as civil D18S with autopilot and R-985-AN-3 engines; 372 aircraft rebuilt

TC-45G
Multiengine crew trainer variant of C-45G; AT-7s and AT-11s remanufactured in the early 1950s for the USAF to similar standard as civil D18S, 96 aircraft rebuilt
C-45H
AT-7s and AT-11s remanufactured in the early 1950s for the USAF to similar standard as civil D18S, with no autopilot and R-985-AN-14B engines; 432 aircraft rebuilt

TC-45H

RC-45J
In 1962, all surviving U.S. Navy SNB-5Ps were redesignated RC-45J

TC-45J
In 1962 all surviving U.S. Navy SNB-5s were redesignated TC-45J

UC-45J
Subsequent redesignation of RC-45J and TC-45J

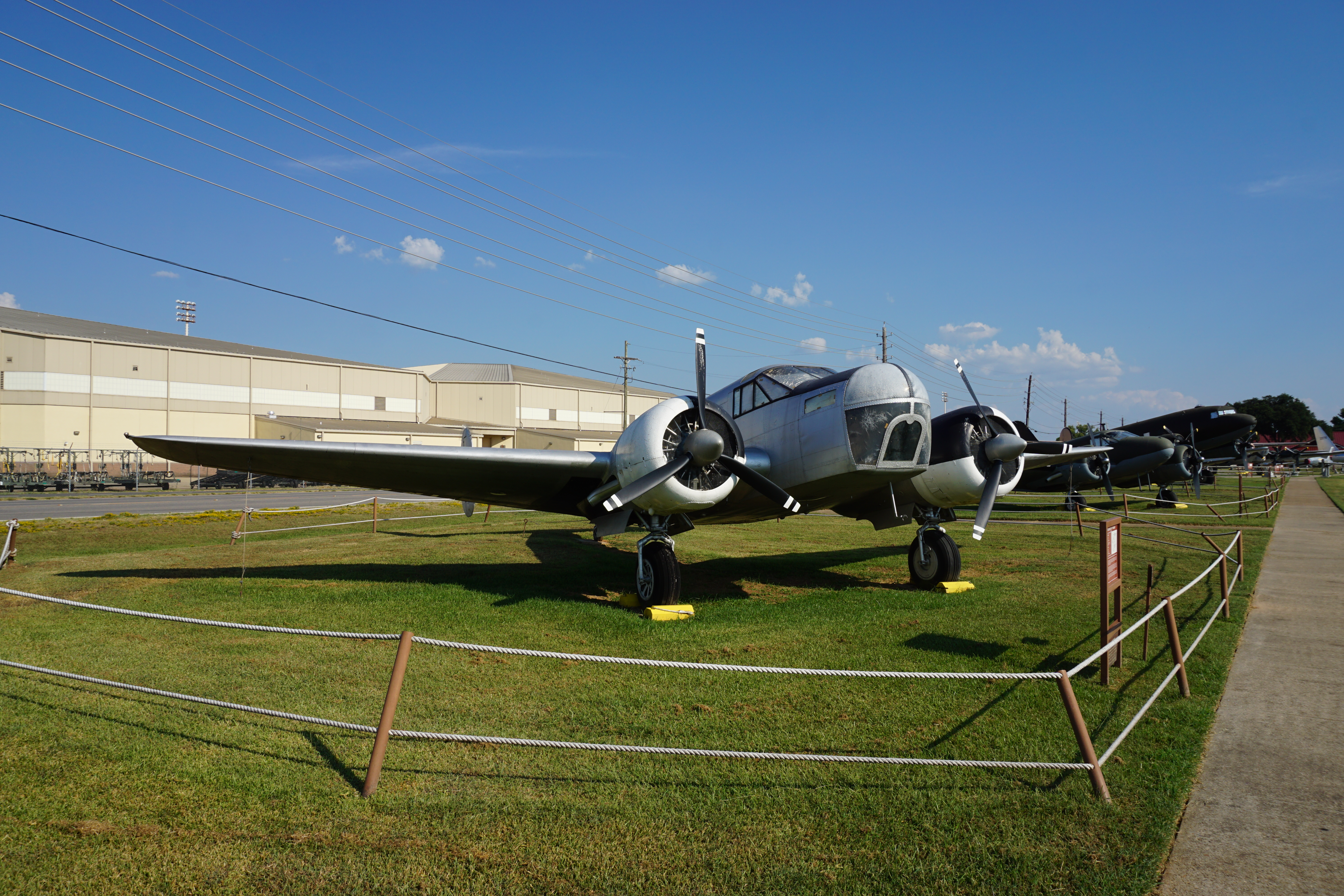
AT-11 at the Barksdale Global Power Museum

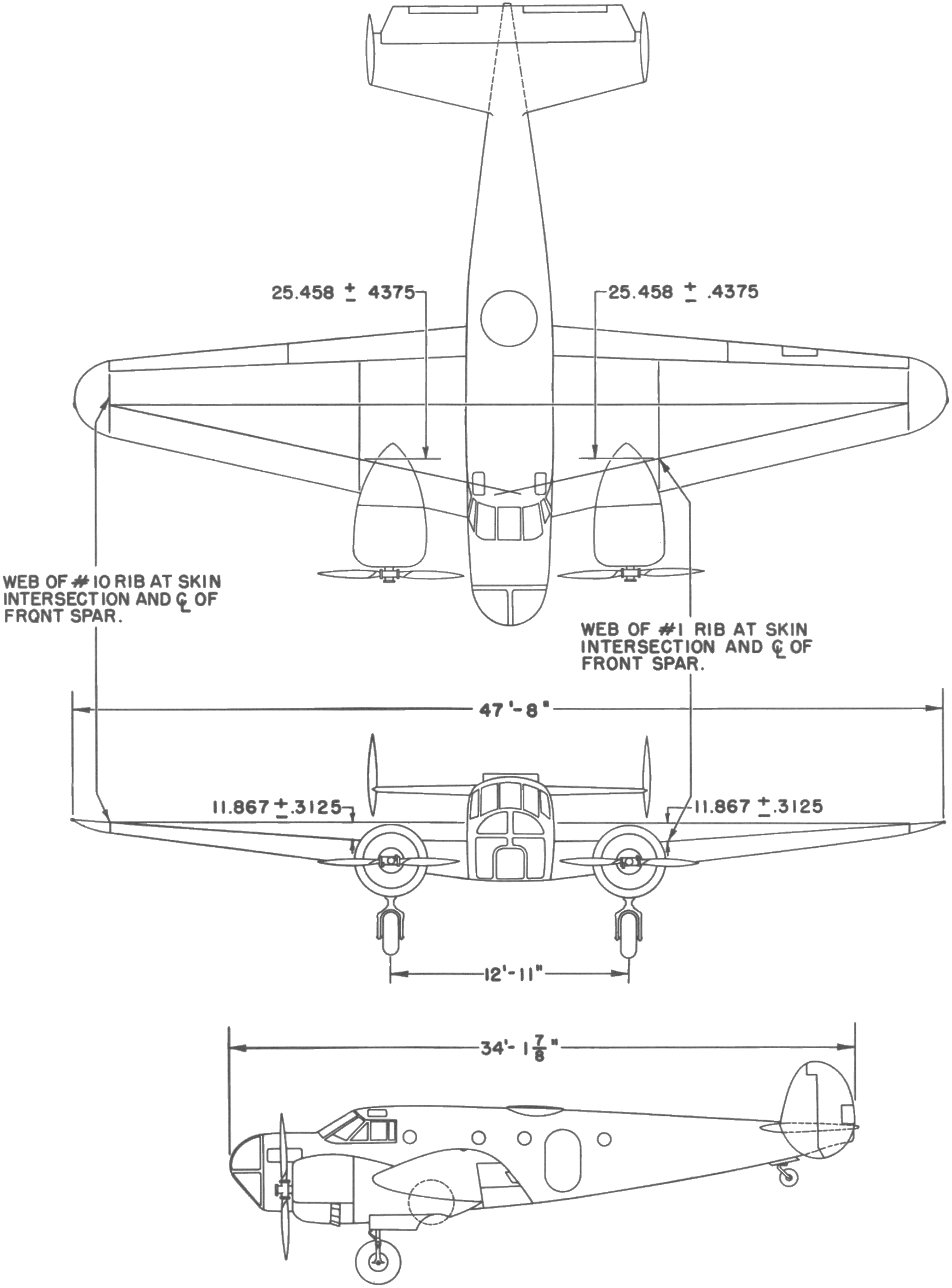
A 3-view line drawing of an AT-11

AT-7 Navigator
Navigation trainer based on C18S, with an astrodome and positions for three students, powered by 450-hp Pratt & Whitney R-985-25 engines; 577 built

AT-7A
Floatplane version of AT-7; six built

AT-7B
Winterised AT-7; nine built

AT-7C
Based on C18S with R-985-AN3 engines; 549 built

AT-11 Kansan
Bombing and gunnery trainer for USAAF derived from AT-7, fuselage had small, circular cabin windows, bombardier position in nose, and bomb bay; gunnery trainers were also fitted with two or three .30-caliber machine guns, early models (the first 150 built) had a single .30-cal AN-M2 in a Beechcraft-manufactured top turret, later models used a Crocker Wheeler twin .30-cal top turret, a bottom tunnel gun was used for tail gunner training, 1,582 built for USAAF orders, with 24 ordered by Netherlands repossessed by USAAF and used by the Royal Netherlands Military Flying School at Jackson, Mississippi.

AT-11A
Conversion of AT-11 as navigation trainer; 36 converted

CQ-3
Conversion of UC-45F, modified to act as drone control aircraft, redesignated as DC-45F in June 1948

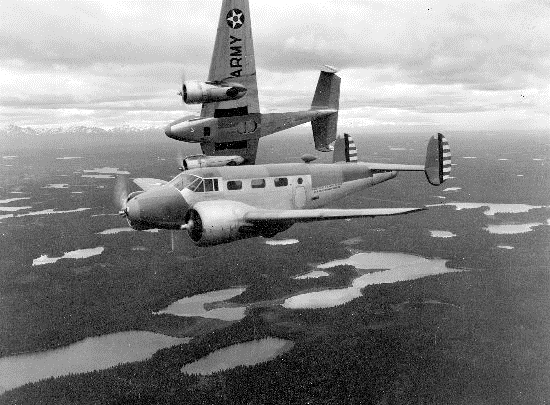
F-2s in Alaska, 1941

F-2
Photo-reconnaissance version based on B18

F-2A
Improved version

F-2B

==== US Navy designations ====
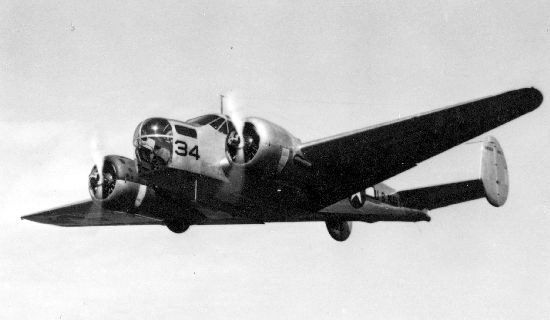
SNB-1 Kansan

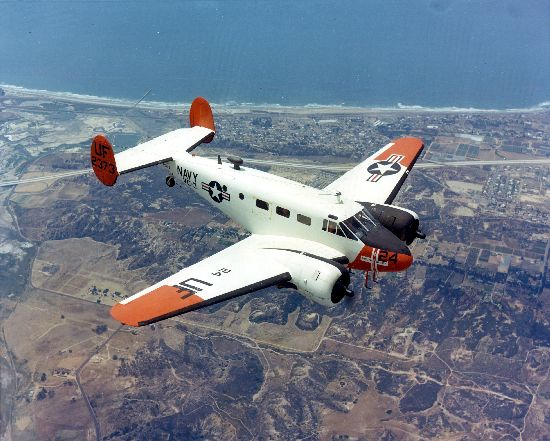
SNB-2 Navigator

JRB-1
Photographic aircraft, based on the C18S, fitted with fairing over cockpit for improved visibility, 11 obtained, at least one conversion from impressed civil B18S

JRB-2
Light transport, based on the C18S; 15 obtained, at least one conversion from JRB-1, some transferred from USAAF C-45A stocks

JRB-3
Photographic version, similar to C-45B; 23 obtained, some transferred from USAAF C-45B stocks

JRB-4
Utility transport version, equivalent to UC-45F; 328 obtained from USAAF

JRB-6
Remanufactured JRB

SNB-1
Similar to AT-11; 110 built

SNB-2
Navigation trainer similar to AT-7, 299 built

SNB-2C
Navigation trainer similar to AT-7C, 375 built

SNB-2H
Ambulance conversion

SNB-2P
Photo-reconnaissance trainer conversion

SNB-3Q
Electronic countermeasures trainer conversion

SNB-5
Remanufactured SNB or JRB

SNB-5P
Remanufactured SNB-2P

==== RAF/RCAF Lend-lease designations ====
Expeditor I
C-45Bs supplied to the Royal Air Force (RAF) under Lend-Lease
Expeditor II
C-45Fs supplied to the RAF and Royal Navy under Lend-Lease

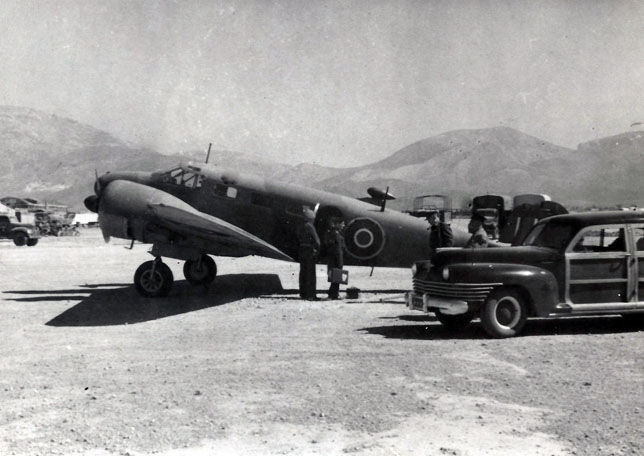
RAF C-45 Expeditor HB260 of the Allied Control Commission, Bulgaria, 1945.

Expeditor III
C-45Fs supplied to the Royal Canadian Air Force (RCAF) under Lend-Lease

==== Post-war RCAF designations ====
C-45Ds delivered between 1951 and 1952

Expeditor 3N
navigation trainer – 88 built
Expeditor 3NM
navigational trainer that could be converted to a transport – 59 built
Expeditor 3NMT
3NM converted to a transport aircraft – 67 built
Expeditor 3NMT(Special)
navigation trainer/personnel transport – 19 built
Expeditor 3TM
transport with fittings so it could be converted to a navigation trainer – 44 built
Expeditor 3TM(Special)
modified RCAF Expeditors used overseas in conjunction with Project WPB6 – three built

==== Canadian Armed Forces ====
CT-128 Expeditor
1968 redesignation of existing RCAF aircraft upon unification of the Canadian Armed Forces

==== Brazilian Air Force designations ====
U-45
Designation for the C-45.

==== Royal Thai Air Force designations ====
B.L.1
(Thai: บ.ล.๑) designation for the C-45B and C-45F.

=== Conversions ===
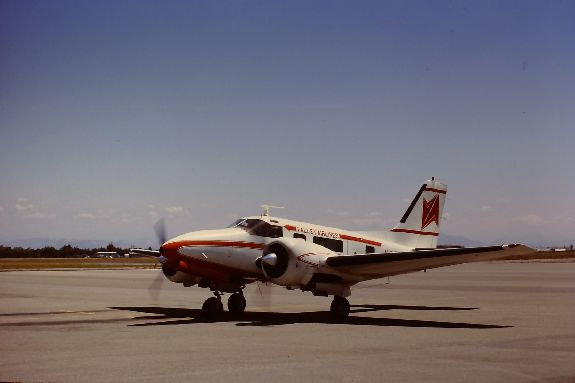
PacAero Tradewind

Conrad 9800
Modification increasing the gross weight to 9,800 pounds with a single piece windshield
Dumod I
Executive conversion with Volpar tricycle landing gear, new wing tips, enlarged fight deck and refurbished 6–7 seat cabin with larger windows. Originally named Infinité I. 37 converted by 1966.
Dumod Liner
Stretched airliner conversion. Similar to Dumod I but with forward fuselage stretched by 6 feet 3 inches (1.91 m), allowing up to 15 passengers to be carried. Originally named Infinité II.
Hamilton HA-1
conversion of a TC-45J aircraft
Hamilton Little Liner
Modification of D18S with aerodynamic improvements and new, retractable tailwheel, capable of carrying 11 seats
Hamilton Westwind
Turboprop conversions with various engines

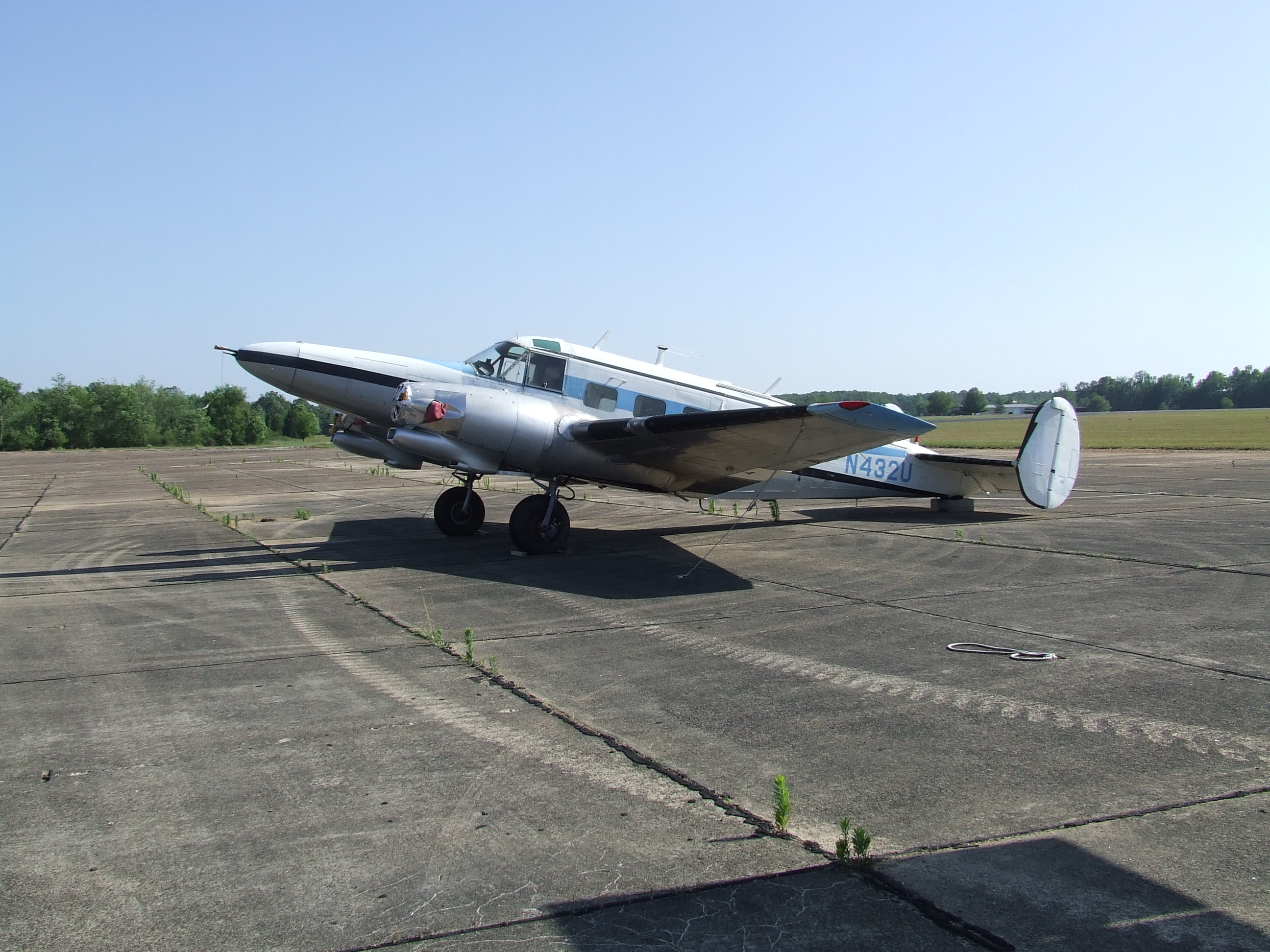
Hamilton Westwind III conversion at an airfield in Tennessee

Hamilton Westwind II STD
Stretched conversion powered by two 840-hp PT6As, and with accommodation for up to 17 passengers
Hamilton Westwind III
two 579-hp PT6A-20s or 630-hp PT6A-27s or 630-hp Lycoming LTS101s.
Hamilton Westwind IV
two 570-hp Lycoming LTP101s or 680-hp PT6A-28s or 750-hp PT6A-34s or 1020-hp PT6A-45s
PacAero Tradewind
Conversion of Beech D18S/C-45 to five- to 11-seat executive transport with single fin by Pacific Airmotive
Rausch Star 250
Built as C-45F 44-47231, this aircraft was re-manufactured at Wichita by Beech in 1952, to become TC-45G 51-11544. From 1959 Rausch Engineering Inc. of South San Francisco, California, converted N8186H to tricycle undercarriage, using forward retracting main gear from a P-51 and rearward-retracting nose-leg from a T-28, adding a 3 ft (0.91 m) nose extension, 4 ft (1.22 m) rear fuselage extension, re-roofed fuselage for increased headroom and enlarged cabin windows. The modifications did not obtain FAA certification despite 58 hours of flight testing, with the aircraft eventually being broken up at Antioch, CA, in 1978.
SFERMA-Beechcraft PD.18S
Modification of Beech 18S powered by two Turboméca Bastan turboprops
Volpar (Beechcraft) Model 18
Conversion of Model 18 with nosewheel undercarriage
Volpar (Beechcraft) Super 18
Volpar (Beechcraft) Turbo 18
Beech Model 18s fitted with the Volpar MkIV tricycle undercarriage and powered by two 705-hp Garrett TPE331-1-101B turboprop engines, flat-rated to 605 hp (451 kW), driving Hartzell HC-B3TN-5 three-bladed, reversible-pitch, constant-speed feathering propellers
Volpar (Beechcraft) Super Turbo 18
2x 705 hp (526 kW) Garrett TPE331
Volpar (Beechcraft) C-45G
C-45G aircraft modified with tricycle undercarriage
Volpar (Beechcraft) Turboliner
15-passenger version of the Turbo 18 with extended fuselage, powered by 2 705-hp Garrett TPE331-1-101Bs
Volpar (Beechcraft) Turboliner II
Turboliners modified to meet SFAR 23

== Operators ==
=== Civil ===
As of 2012, the Beechcraft Model 18 remains popular with air charter companies and small feeder airlines worldwide.

=== Military ===
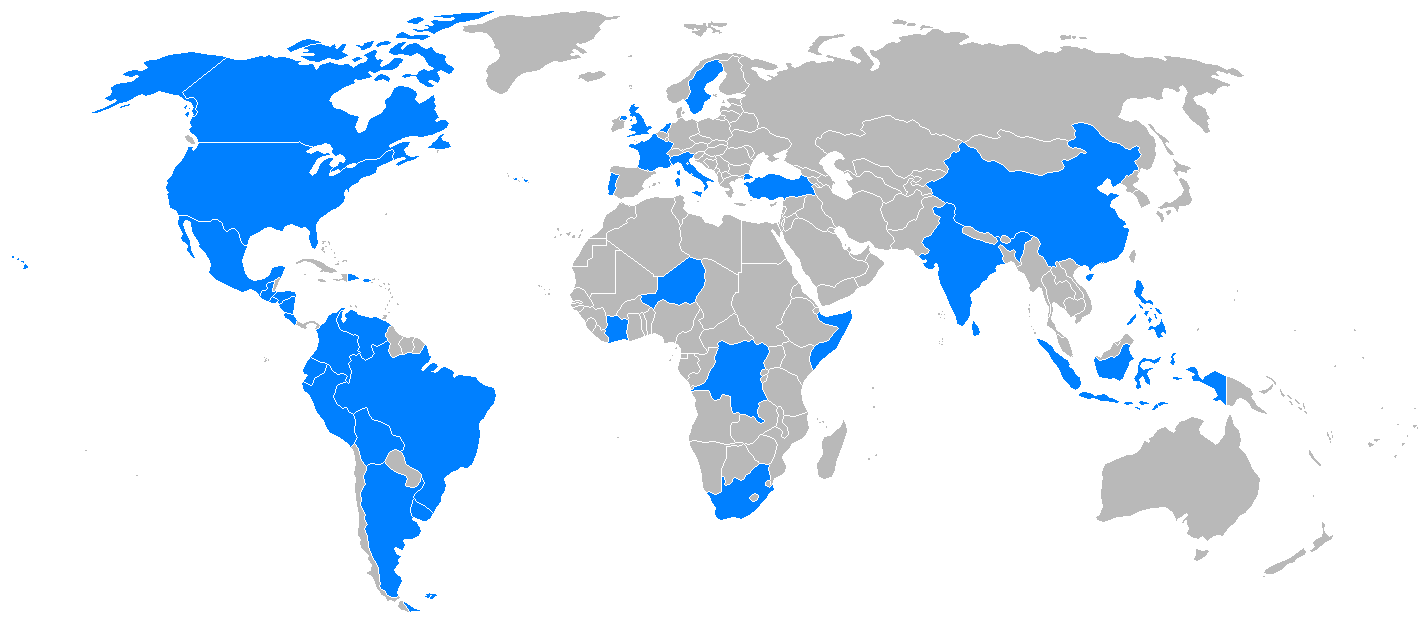
Military Model 18 operators

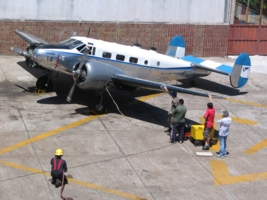
Argentine Navy C-45

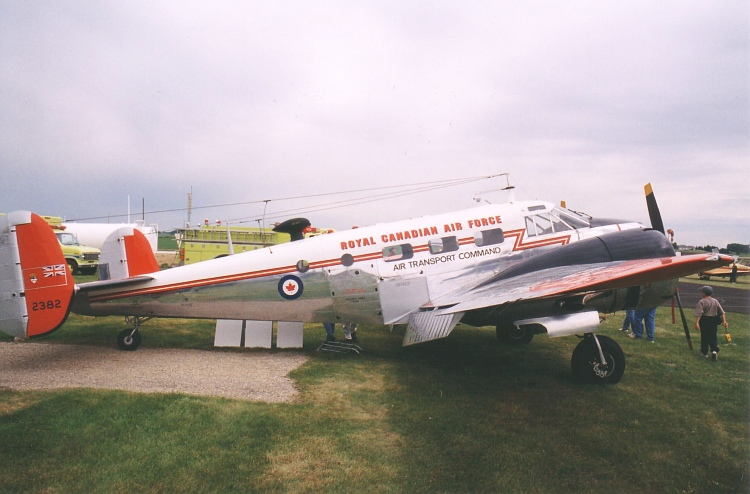
Beechcraft C-45 Expeditor in RCAF Air Transport Command markings

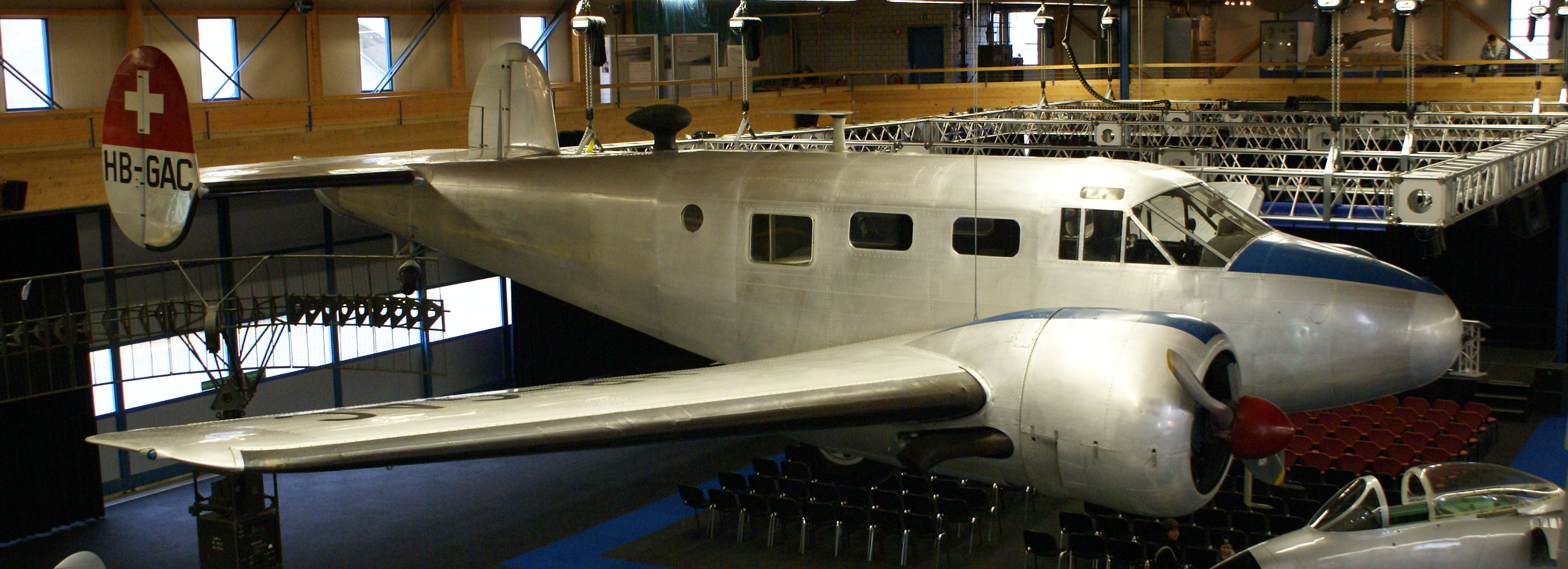
C-45 as used by the Swiss Air Force for civilian aerial photography missions

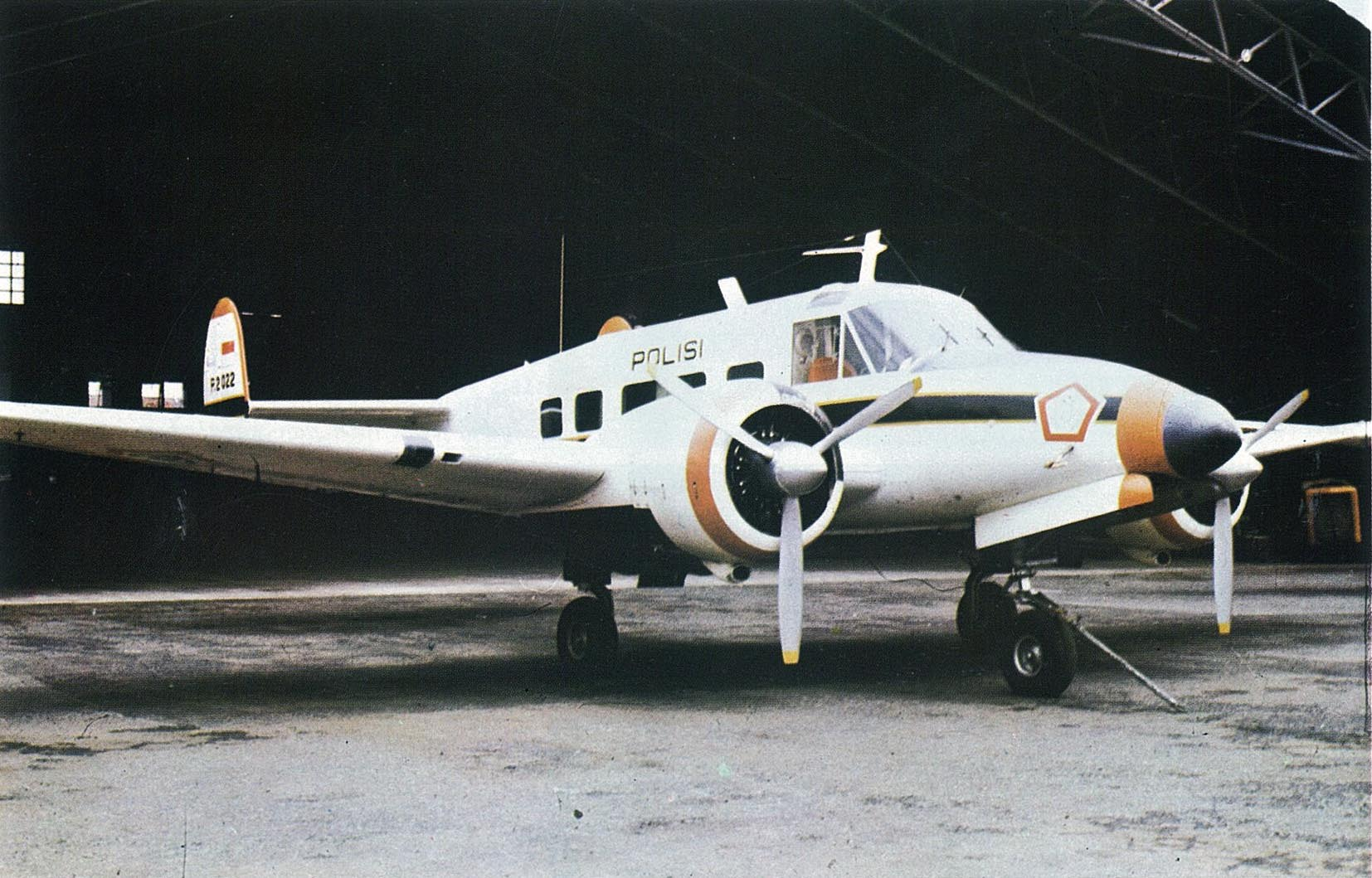
Beechcraft Model D18S of the Indonesian National Police

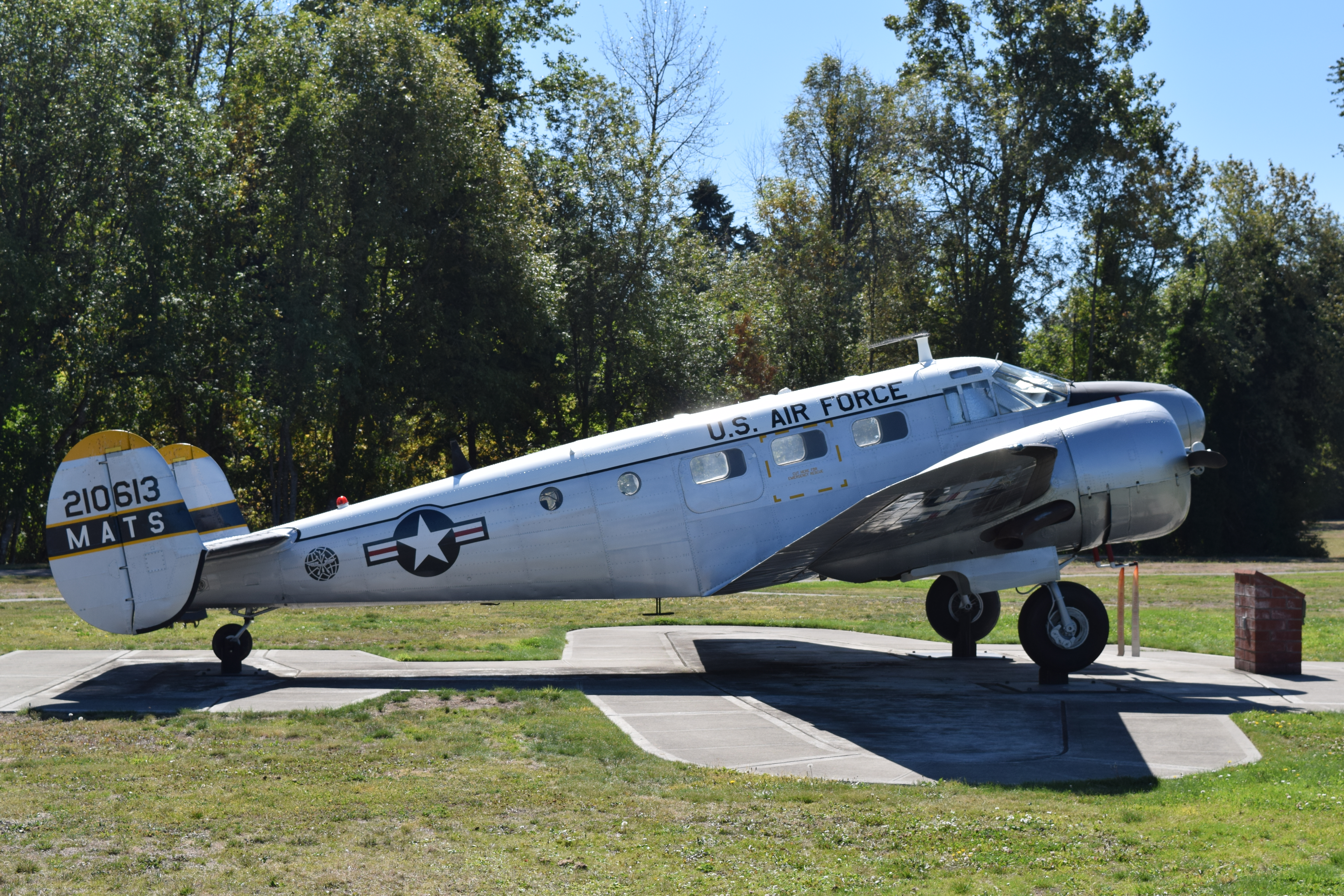
UC-45J BuNo.89484 of the now defunct Military Air Transport Service

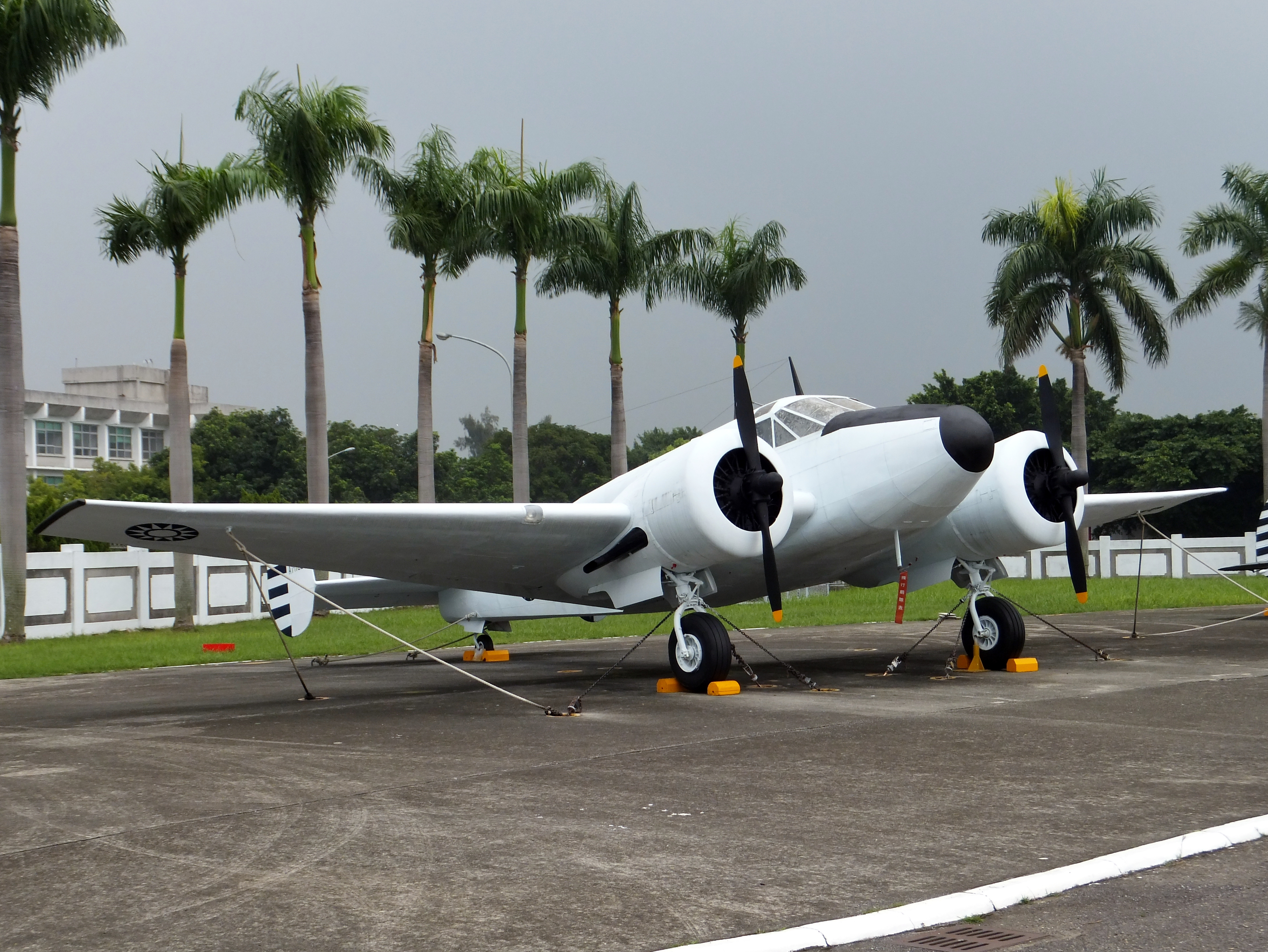
ROC Air Force AT-11

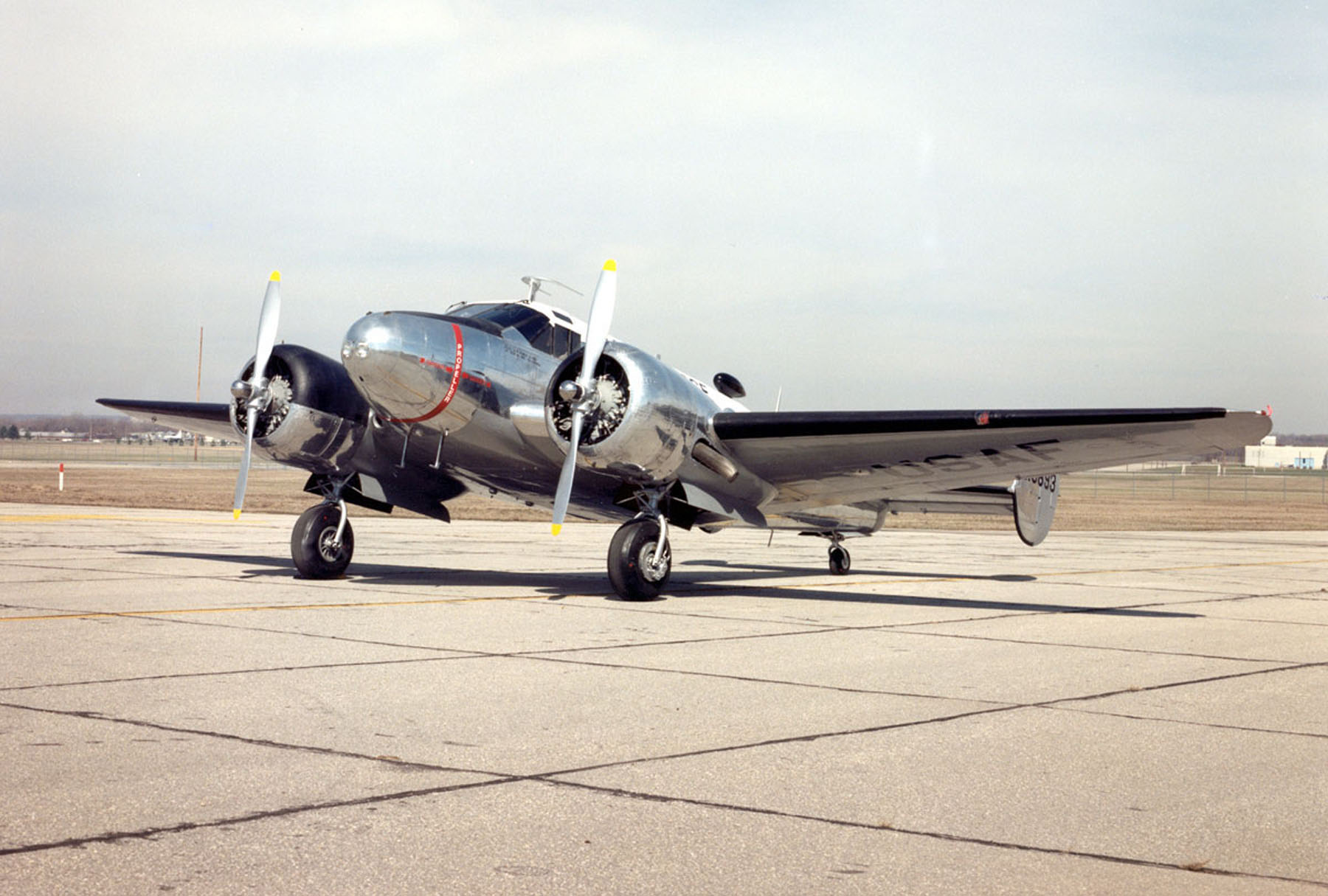
Beech 18/C-45 at the National Museum of the United States Air Force

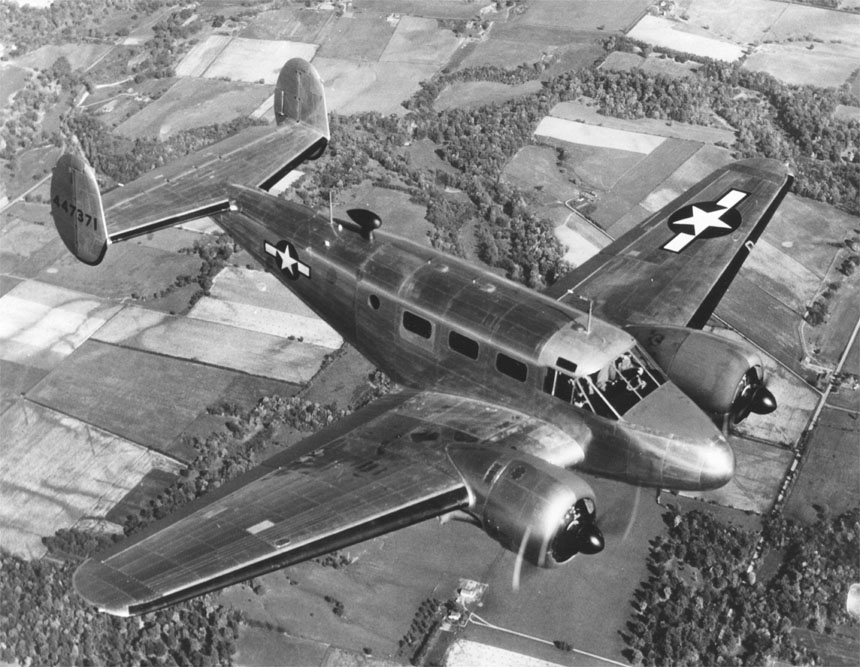
Beechcraft UC-45F in flight

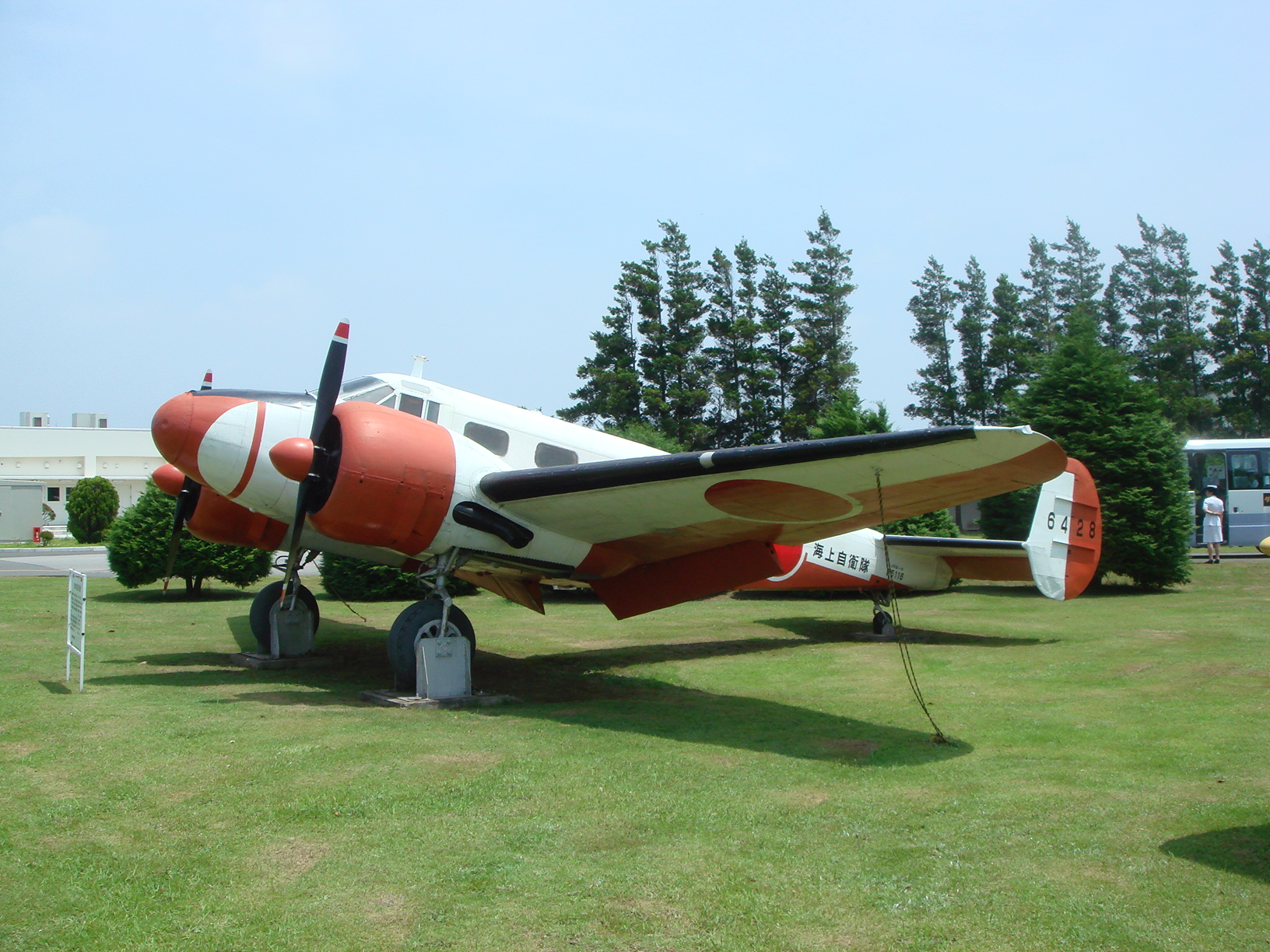
Japan Maritime Self-Defense Force SNB-4

Argentina

- Argentine Air Force
- Argentine Naval Aviation

Bolivia

- Bolivian Air Force

Brazil

- Brazilian Air Force

Canada

- Royal Canadian Air Force 394 examples from 1941 to 1972
- Royal Canadian Navy 10 examples from 1952 to 1960
  - VX-10 Squadron
  - VU-32 Squadron
- Canadian Armed Forces

Chile

- Chilean Air Force
- Chilean Army
- Chilean Navy

Colombia

- Colombian Air Force

Costa Rica

- Public Force of Costa Rica

Côte d'Ivoire
Cuba

- Cuban Air Force - received two AT-7s, two AT-11s, a F-2B and a UC-45F in 1947

Dominican Republic

- Dominican Air Force

Ecuador

- Ecuadorian Air Force

El Salvador

- Salvadoran Air Force

France

- French Air Force
- French Naval Aviation

Guatemala

- Guatemalan Air Force

Haiti

- Haiti Air Corps

Honduras

- Honduran Air Force

Indonesia

- Indonesian Army
- Indonesian National Police

Iran
Italy

- Italian Air Force operated 125 aircraft from 1949 until the 1970s

Japan

- Japan Maritime Self-Defense Force
- Japan Coast Guard

Mexico

- Mexican Air Force
- Mexican Navy

Netherlands

- Royal Netherlands Air Force
- Dutch Naval Aviation Service

Nicaragua

- Nicaraguan Air Force

Niger

- Niger Air Force

Nigeria
Paraguay

- Paraguayan Air Force

Peru

- Peruvian Air Force

Philippines

- Philippine Army Air Corps

Portugal

- Forca Aerea Portuguesa
- Portuguese Navy

Somalia

- Somali Air Force – Withdrawn in 1991

South Africa

- South African Air Force

South Vietnam

- Republic of Vietnam Air Force

Spain
Sri Lanka

- Sri Lanka Air Force

Sweden

- Swedish Air Force

Switzerland

- Swiss Air Force

Taiwan

- Republic of China Air Force

Thailand

- Royal Thai Air Force

Tonga

- Tongan Air Wing

Turkey

- Turkish Air Force

United Kingdom

- Royal Air Force
- Royal Navy – Fleet Air Arm 76 Lend-Lease
  - 701 Naval Air Squadron
  - 712 Naval Air Squadron
  - 723 Naval Air Squadron
  - 724 Naval Air Squadron
  - 728 Naval Air Squadron
  - 730 Naval Air Squadron
  - 739 Naval Air Squadron
  - 742 Naval Air Squadron
  - 755 Naval Air Squadron
  - 781 Naval Air Squadron
  - 782 Naval Air Squadron
  - 791 Naval Air Squadron

United States

- United States Army
  - United States Army Air Corps
  - United States Army Air Forces
- United States Air Force
- United States Coast Guard
  - United States Coast Guard Reserve
- United States Marine Corps
- United States Navy

Uruguay

- Uruguayan Air Force

Venezuela

- Venezuelan Air Force

Zaire

- Zairian Air Force

== Accidents and incidents ==
The Beechcraft Model 18 family has been involved in the following notable accidents and incidents:

- 25 April 1951: Cubana de Aviación Flight 493, a Douglas DC-4 bound from Miami to Havana, registration CU-T188, collided with a U.S. Navy SNB-1, bureau number 39939, which was performing a practice instrument approach to Naval Air Station Key West. The collision and ensuing crashes killed all 34 passengers and five crew aboard the DC-4 and all five crew aboard the SNB. The accident occurred at midday, weather was clear with unlimited visibility, and both flight crews had been cleared to fly under visual flight rules, being expected to "see and avoid" other aircraft; the student flying the SNB was wearing view-limiting goggles, but the other SNB crew were not, and were expected to keep watch. Ground witnesses said that neither aircraft took evasive action prior to the collision, and the Civil Aeronautics Board attributed the accident to the failure of both flight crews to see and avoid conflicting air traffic.
- 19 September 1965: During the India–Pakistan war of 1965, eight people including Chief Minister Balwantrai Mehta of Gujarat, India, were killed when their civilian-registered Beechcraft 18 was shot down southwest of Bhuj by an F-86 Sabre of the Pakistan Air Force, which had concluded that the Indian Army had been conducting reconnaissance of a nearby conflict zone using civil aircraft.
- 1967: Mohammed bin Awad bin Laden was killed in the crash of a Beechcraft 18 in Saudi Arabia.
- 10 December 1967: American soul music singer Otis Redding, four members of his backing band the Bar-Kays, the pilot, and another member of Redding's entourage were killed in the crash of Redding's H18, registration N390R, into Lake Monona on approach to Truax Field in Wisconsin. The National Transportation Safety Board (NTSB) was unable to determine the cause of the crash, noting that the left engine and propeller were not recovered. Trumpet player Ben Cauley, the sole survivor of the crash, subsequently revived the Bar-Kays together with another band member who was aboard a different aircraft.
- 20 September 1973: American folk rock singer-songwriter Jim Croce, four members of his entourage, and the pilot were killed when their chartered E18S, registration N50JR, crashed into a tree shortly after takeoff from Natchitoches Regional Airport in Louisiana. The NTSB attributed the accident to reduced visibility due to fog, and to physical impairment of the pilot, who had severe coronary artery disease and had run 3 mi (4.8 km) to the airport. An investigation conducted for a lawsuit against the charter company attributed the accident solely to pilot error, citing his downwind takeoff into a "black hole" of severe darkness, causing him to experience spatial disorientation.
- 26 September 1978: Air Caribbean Flight 309, an air taxi flight by a D18S, registration N500L, crashed on approach to Isla Verde International Airport in Puerto Rico, killing the pilot and the five passengers aboard the aircraft and causing substantial property damage and injuries to bystanders on the ground. The pilot could not communicate with approach control and was following directions relayed by local tower controllers, who told the pilot to make a turn and maintain separation from a Lockheed L-1011 that was overtaking the flight, but the pilot did not turn, and the D18S passed underneath and very close to the L-1011. Both the NTSB and a U.S. District Court ruling attributed the crash to the D18S pilot's failure to correctly follow visual flight rules and air traffic control instructions to maintain separation from the much larger L-1011, causing a loss of aircraft control due to wake turbulence. A contributing factor was the pilot's difficulties in communication with controllers.
- 4 July 1987: Ten people, including all then-current members of The Montana Band, were killed when the pilot of their chartered D18S, N132E, failed to clear a hillside near Lakeside, Montana, while performing a flypast of the venue where the band had performed earlier. The pilot performed an "abrupt" climb and performed a "hammerhead stall" maneuver, reversing direction and entering a dive. The accident was attributed to the pilot's poor judgment and failure to maintain altitude during unauthorized attempted aerobatics.

== Aircraft on display ==
=== Argentina ===
- 3495 – AT-11A at the Museo Nacional de Aeronáutica de Argentina in Buenos Aires.
- 5621 – C-45H at the Museo Nacional de Aeronáutica de Argentina in Buenos Aires.
- AF-555 – C-45H at the Museo Nacional de Aeronáutica de Argentina in Buenos Aires.
- c/no. BA-752 (former LV-JFH) – H18S at the Museo Nacional de Aeronáutica de Argentina in Buenos Aires.

=== Australia ===
- c/no. BA-81 (former N3781B) – E18S at the Queensland Air Museum in Caloundra, Queensland.

=== Belgium ===
- c/no CA-191 (former C-FGNR) – 3NM at Pairi Daiza.

=== Brazil ===
- 4615 – AT-11 at the Museu Aeroespacial in Rio de Janeiro, Brazil.
- 2850 - C-45 at the Museu Matarazzo in Bebedouro, São Paulo.
- 2856 – C-45F at the Museu Aeroespacial in Rio de Janeiro, Brazil.
- 2888 - C-45 at the Aeroclube da Paraíba in João Pessoa.

=== Canada ===
- 459 – C-45H at the Canadian Bushplane Heritage Centre in Sault Ste. Marie, Ontario. Tail code CF-MJY
- 8034 – 3TM at the Canadian Bushplane Heritage Centre in Sault Ste. Marie, Ontario.
- c/no. A-141 (former CF-MPH) – D18S at the RCMP Academy, Depot Division in Regina, Saskatchewan.
- c/no. A-142 (former CF-MPI) – D18S at the Bomber Command Museum of Canada in Nanton, Alberta.
- c/no. A-156 – D18S at the Canadian Warplane Heritage Museum in Hamilton, Ontario.
- c/no. A-652 (former RCAF 1477) – 3N at the Royal Aviation Museum of Western Canada in Winnipeg, Manitoba.
- c/no. A-700 – 3NMT at the Canadian Air Land Sea Museum at Toronto/Markham Airport in Markham, Ontario.
- c/no. A-710 – 3NM at the North Atlantic Aviation Museum in Gander, Newfoundland and Labrador.
- c/no. A-782 (former CF-CKT) – 3NMT at the Canadian Museum of Flight in Langley, British Columbia.
- c/no. A-872 – 3NMT at the TransCanada Highway in Ignace, Ontario.
- c/no. A-895 – 3NM at the Alberta Aviation Museum in Edmonton, Alberta.
- c/no. 92-074 – 3NM at The Hangar Flight Museum in Calgary, Alberta.

=== Chile ===
- c/no. A-1024 (former FACh 465) – D18S at the Museo Aeronautico y del Espacio in Santiago, Chile.

=== India ===
- VT-CNY – D18S former aircraft of the Raja of Mayurbhanj and later sold to Coal India Limited- at the Hotel Mayfair Lagoon in Bhubaneswar, Orissa.

=== Italy ===
- 6668 – C-45F suspended inside the Olbia Costa Smeralda Airport passenger terminal in Olbia, Sardinia. This was the first aircraft owned by Alisarda Airlines and was used in the filming of the movie The Last Emperor.

=== Japan ===
- 'JA5174' – H18 the final Beech 18 produced (c/n BA-765), delivered January 1970 to Miyazaki Aviation College, Japan. In use until 1988, now preserved at the College, Miyazaki Airport.

=== Malta ===
- 8304 – C-45H under restoration at the Malta Aviation Museum in Ta' Qali, Malta.

=== Mexico ===
- "ETL-1320" (S/N): 18 – UC-45J at the Museo Militar de Aviación.

=== Netherlands ===
- 51-11665 – C-45G at the Aviodrome in Lelystad, Netherlands.

=== New Zealand ===
- 3691 – AT-11 at the Museum of Transport and Technology in Auckland, New Zealand.

=== Portugal ===
- 2504 – AT-11 at the Museu do Ar in Sintra, Portugal.
- 2506 – AT-11 at the Parque do Avião in Leiria, Portugal.

=== Spain ===
- AF-752 – C-45H at Fundación Infante de Orleans in Madrid, Spain.

=== Turkey ===
- 6390/9-930 – AT-11 at Istanbul Aviation Museum.

=== United Kingdom ===
- G-ASUG c/no. BA-111 – E18S at the National Museum of Flight in East Lothian, Scotland.

=== United States ===
- 41-27561 – AT-11 at the National Museum of the United States Air Force in Dayton, Ohio. or 42-37493
- 41-27616 – AT-11B at the Travis Air Force Base Heritage Center at Travis AFB, California.
- 42-36887 – AT-11 at the Barksdale Global Power Museum in Bossier City, Louisiana.
- 42-37240 – AT-11 at the Lone Star Flight Museum in Galveston, Texas.
- 42-37496 – UC-45 at the Wings Over the Rockies Air and Space Museum in Denver, Colorado. This aircraft was originally an AT-11 before being remanufactured.
- 44-47342 – UC-45F at the Alaska Aviation Heritage Museum in Anchorage, Alaska.
- 51-11467 – C-45G at the EAA Chapter 1241 Air Museum at the Florida Keys Marathon Airport in Marathon, Florida.
- 51-11529 – TC-45H at the Tri-State Warbird Museum in Batavia, Ohio.
- 51-11696 – C-45H at the Museum of Flight in Seattle, Washington.
- 51-11795 – C-45G at the Air Mobility Command Museum in Dover, Delaware.
- 51-11897 – C-45G at the Castle Air Museum in Atwater, California.
- 52-10539 – C-45H at the 1941 Historical Aircraft Group Museum in Geneseo, New York.
- 52-10865 – C-45H at the Travis Air Force Base Heritage Center at Travis AFB, California.
- 52-10893 – C-45H at the National Museum of the United States Air Force in Dayton, Ohio.
- 09771 – UC-45J at the National Museum of Naval Aviation in Pensacola, Florida. This aircraft was converted from the last civil Beech 18 built prior to WWII.
- 51225 – UC-45J gate guard at Commemorative Air Force Lone Star Wing, Harrison County Airport (Texas).
- 23774 – UC-45J at Laughlin AFB in Del Rio, Texas.
- 51233 – RC-45J at the Tennessee Museum of Aviation in Sevierville, Tennessee.
- 51242 – UC-45J at the CAF Central Texas Wing in San Marcos, Texas.
- 51291 – UC-45J at the Aerospace Museum of California in Sacramento, California.
- 51338 – UC-45J at the Minnesota Air National Guard Museum in St. Paul, Minnesota.
- c/no. 178 – S18D at the Beechcraft Heritage Museum in Tullahoma, Tennessee.
- c/no. A-935 – D18S at the Beechcraft Heritage Museum in Tullahoma, Tennessee.
- AF-824 – C-45H at the Beechcraft Heritage Museum in Tullahoma, Tennessee.
- c/no. BA-453 – E18S at the Beechcraft Heritage Museum in Tullahoma, Tennessee.
- c/no. BA-670 – H18 at the Lone Star Flight Museum in Galveston, Texas.

== Specifications (UC-45 Expeditor) ==
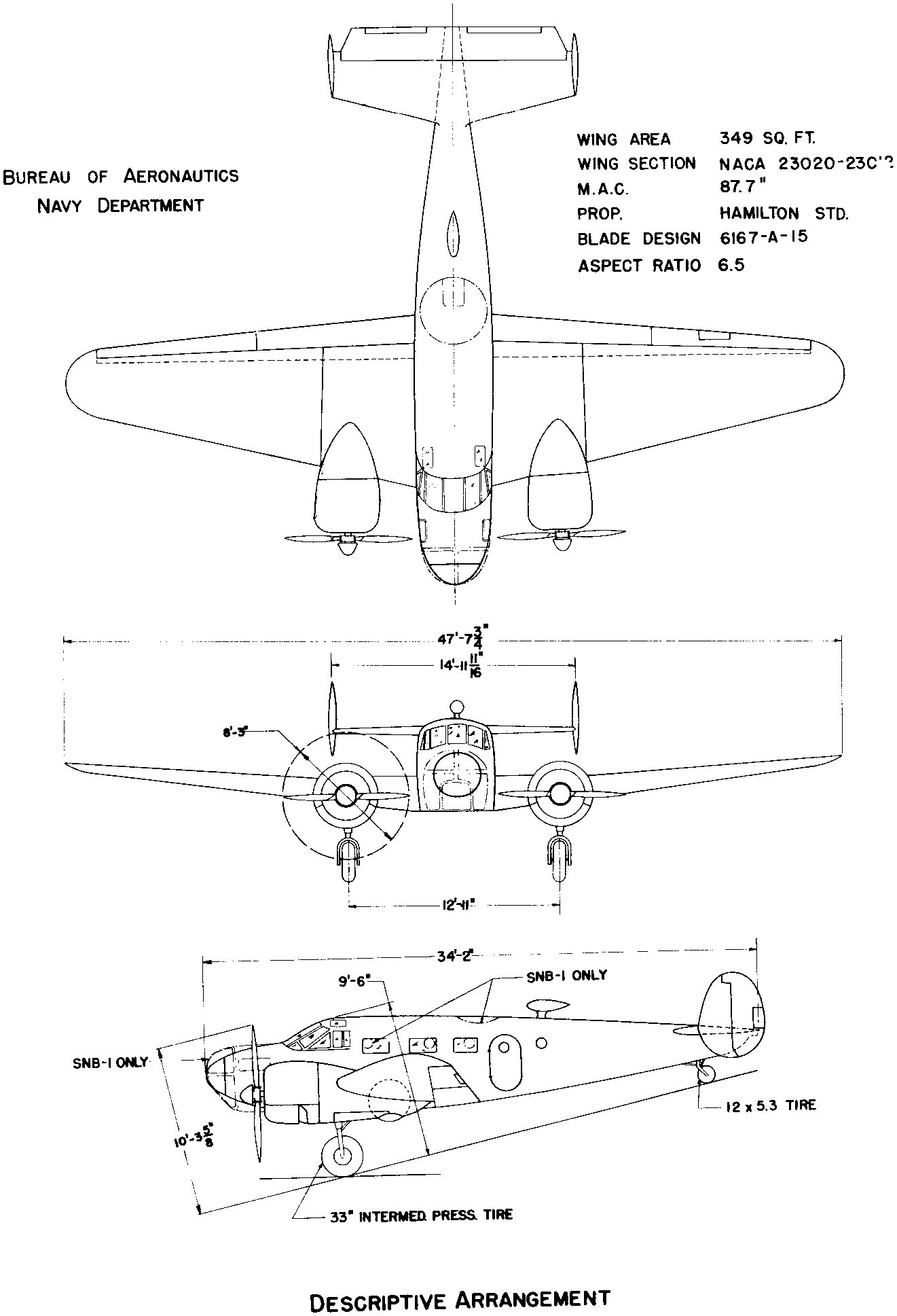
3-view line drawing of the Beechcraft SNB-2 Navigator

Data from Jane's Fighting Aircraft of World War II.

General characteristics

- Crew: 2 pilots
- Capacity: 6 passengers
- Length: 34 ft 3 in (10.44 m)
- Wingspan: 47 ft 8 in (14.53 m)
- Height: 9 ft 9 in (2.97 m)
- Wing area: 349 sq ft (32.4 m^{2})
- Empty weight: 5,420 lb (2,458 kg)
- Gross weight: 7,500 lb (3,402 kg)
- Powerplant: 2 × Pratt & Whitney R-985-AN-1 "Wasp Junior" radial engines, 450 hp (340 kW) each

Performance

- Maximum speed: 225 mph (362 km/h, 196 kn)
- Range: 1,200 mi (1,900 km, 1,000 nmi) at 160 mph (260 km/h; 140 kn) and 5,000 ft (1,500 m)
- Service ceiling: 26,000 ft (7,900 m)
- Rate of climb: 1,850 ft/min (9.4 m/s)

== See also ==
- Air Caribbean Flight 309

Aircraft of comparable role, configuration, and era

- Airspeed Oxford
- Avro Anson
- Barkley-Grow T8P-1
- Cessna AT-17 Bobcat
- De Havilland Dove
- Evangel 4500
- Fairchild AT-21 Gunner
- Lockheed Model 10 Electra
- Lockheed Model 12 Electra Junior
- Siebel Si 204

Related lists

- List of aircraft of World War II
- List of military aircraft of the United States
