= Balwantrai Mehta Committee =

1957 Indian government committee

The Balwant Rai Mehta Committee was a committee originally appointed by the Government of India on 16 January 1957 to examine the working of the Community Development Program (2 October 1952) and the National Extension Service and to suggest measures for their better working. The Chairman of this committee was Balwantrai G. Mehta. The committee submitted its report on 24 November 1957 and recommended the establishment of the scheme of 'democratic decentralization' which finally came to be known as Panchayati Raj. The main aim of Panchayat raj system is to settle the local problems locally and to make the people politically conscious.

The report of the Team for the Study of the Community Projects and National Extension Service, chaired by Balwantrai G. Mehta in 1957 is attached here.

== Recommendations ==
1. The village Panchayat should be constituted with directly elected representatives, whereas the Panchayat Samiti and Zilla Parishad should be constituted with indirectly elected members. This is because Panchayat is similar to that of state assembly where there is place for politics whereas Samiti and Zilla Parishad members should be more educated and knowledgeable and may not need the majority support.
2. All planning and developmental activities should be entrusted to these bodies.
3. The Panchayat Samiti should be the executive body while the Zilla Parishad should be the advisory, coordinating and supervisory body.
4. The District Collector should be the Chairman of the Zilla Parishad.
5. There should be a genuine transfer of power and responsibility to these democratic bodies.
6. Sufficient resources should be transferred to these bodies to enable them to discharge their functions and fulfil their responsibilities.
7. A system should be evolved to effect further devolution of authority in future.
8. Irrespective of political parties, Elections has to be constituted for every 5 years in a genuine way.

These recommendations were accepted by the National Development Council in January 1958.

== Structure ==
- Gram Panchayat: At the village level, with directly elected representatives.
- Panchayat Samiti: At the block level, which should be the main executive body.
- Zila Parishad: At the district level, to be the advisory, coordinating, and supervisory body.

== Adaptation ==
Rajasthan was the first state to launch the system in 1959, followed by Andhra Pradesh in the same year
