= Gujarat Beechcraft incident =

Event during the Indo-Pakistani War of 1965

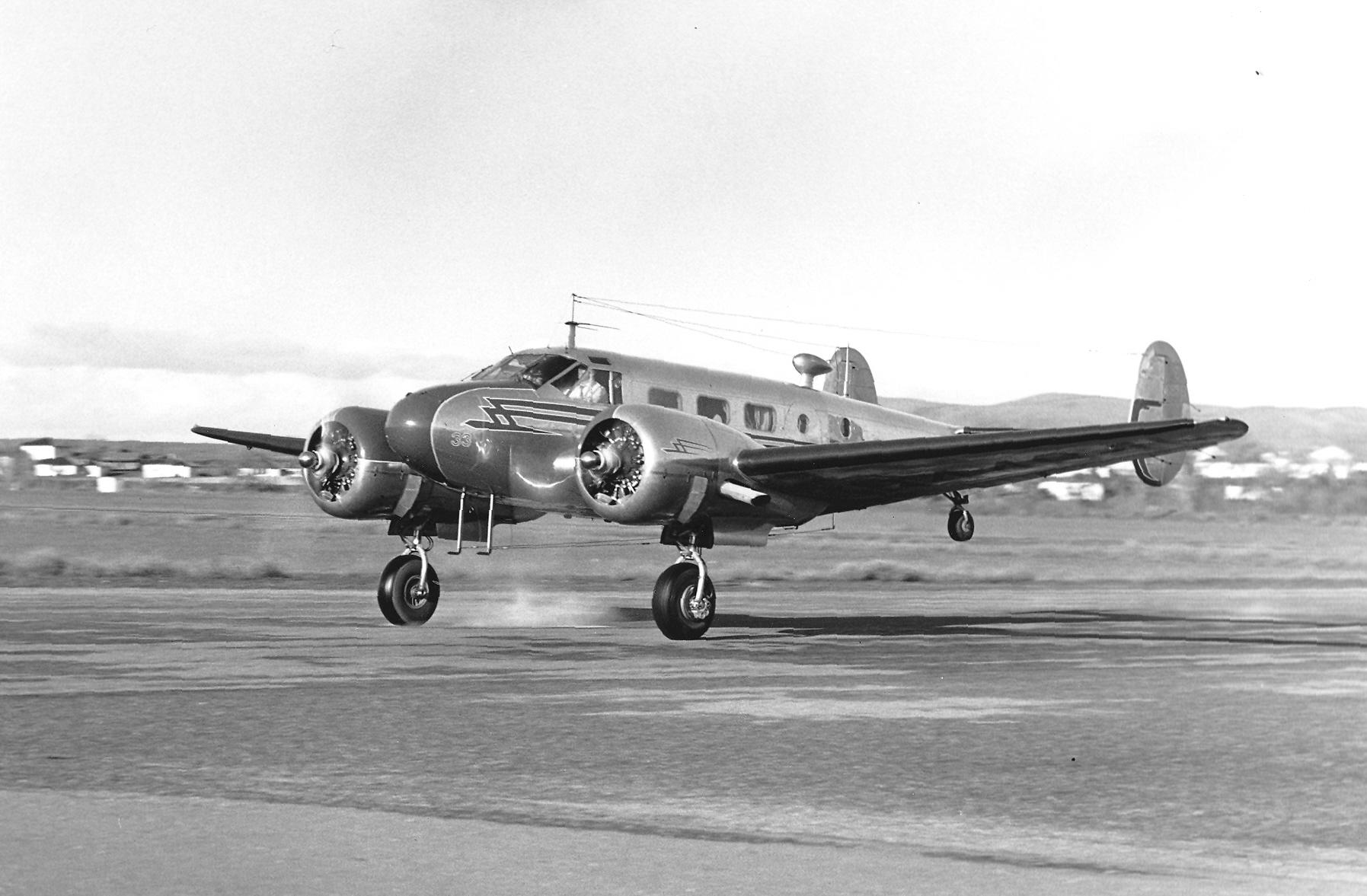
- A Beechcraft Model 18 similar to the involved aircraft

Occurrence
- Date: 19 September 1965
- Summary: Shot down
- Site: 45 nautical miles southwest of Bhuj Gujarat, India.

Aircraft
- Aircraft type: Beechcraft Model 18
- Operator: India
- Flight origin: Ahmedabad, Gujarat
- Destination: Mithapur
- Passengers: 6
- Crew: 2
- Fatalities: 8
- Survivors: 0

The Gujarat Beechcraft incident was an event during the Indo-Pakistani War of 1965. On 19 September that year an American-made F-86 Sabre jet fighter of the Pakistan Air Force (PAF) shot down an Indian-registered civilian Beechcraft Model 18 twin-engine light aircraft. Balwantrai Mehta, who at the time was the chief minister of the Indian state of Gujarat, was killed in the attack along with his wife, three members of his staff, a journalist and two crew members.

Qais Hussain, a PAF flying officer during the 1965 war, was the pilot who fired on the aircraft. In August 2011 he wrote to Farida Singh, the daughter of the deceased civilian pilot, via email, expressing his condolences.

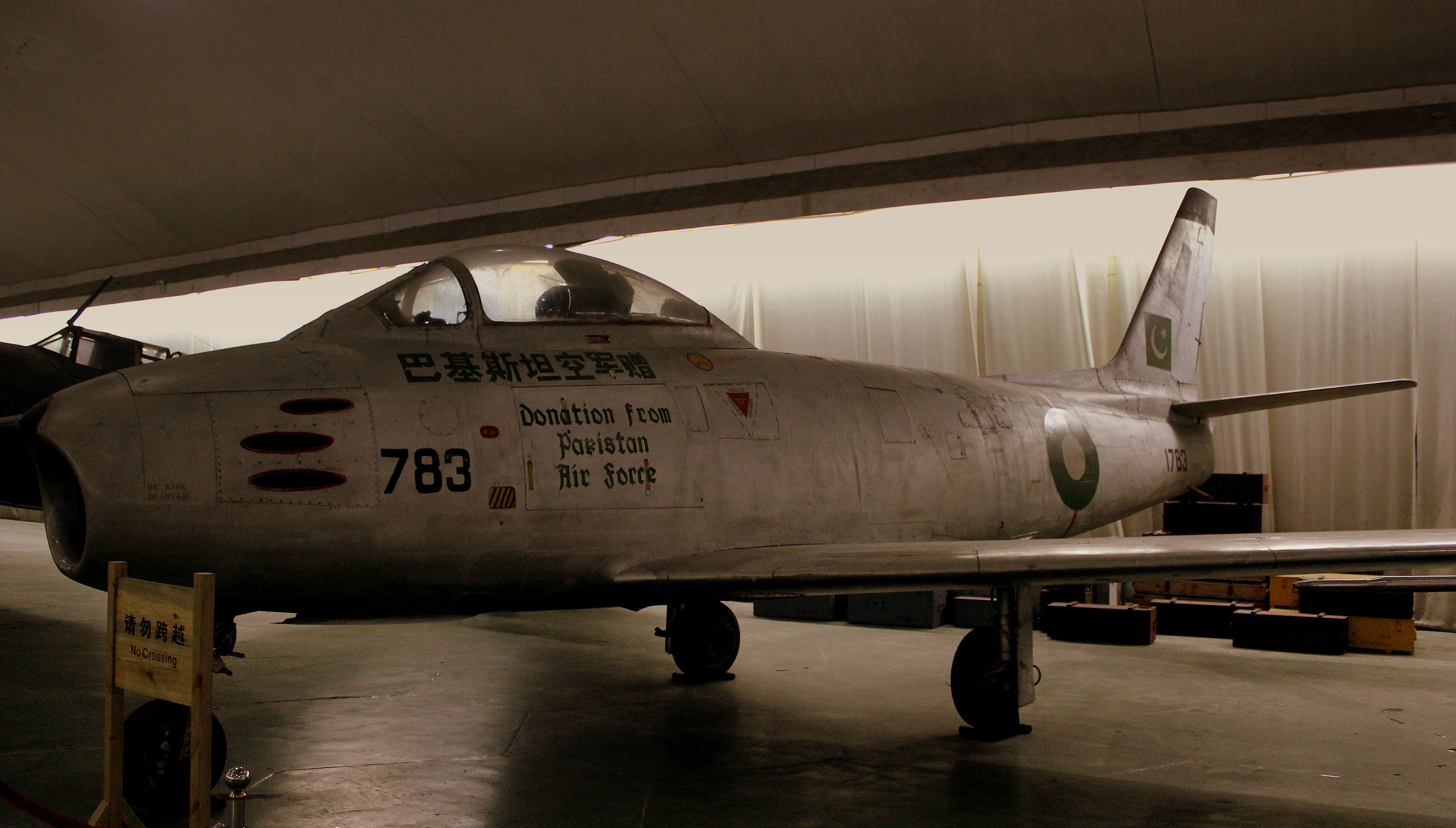
A Pakistan Air Force F-86 Sabre similar to the involved aircraft

== See also ==
- Atlantique incident
