= Balwantrai Mehta =

Indian politician

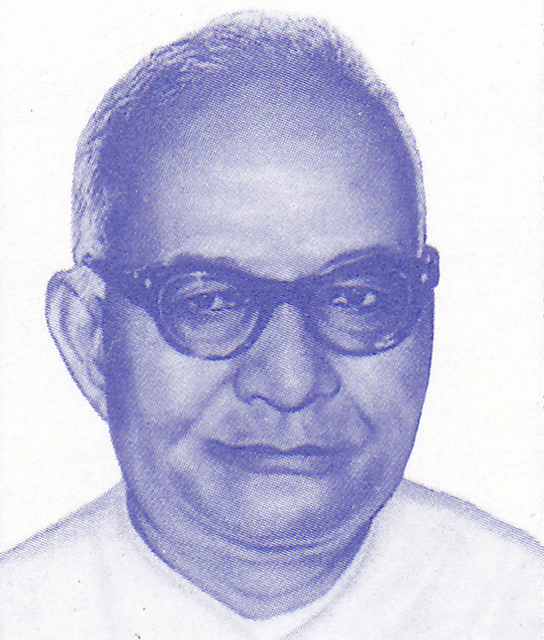

2nd Chief Minister of Gujarat
- In office 25 February 1963 – 19 September 1965
- Preceded by: Jivraj Narayan Mehta
- Succeeded by: Hitendra Kanaiyalal Desai

Member of parliament, Lok Sabha
- In office 17 April 1952 – 31 March 1962
- Prime Minister: Jawaharlal Nehru
- Preceded by: Constituency established
- Succeeded by: Jashvant Mehta
- Constituency: Gohilwad, Gujarat

Personal details
- Born: 19 February 1899 Bhavnagar, Bhavnagar State, British India
- Died: 19 September 1965 (aged 65) Suthari, Gujarat, India
- Cause of death: aircraft shot down Gujarat Beechcraft incident
- Party: Indian National Congress
- Spouse: Sarojben

Balwantrai Gopalji Mehta (19 February 1899 or 1900 (Note: It is disputed whether he was born in 1899 or 1900) – 19 September 1965) was an Indian independence activist and politician who served as the second chief minister of Gujarat from 1963 until his death in 1965 during the Second India–Pakistan war. He is the only sitting chief minister of an Indian state to have been killed during a war.

Mehta was born and raised in Bhavnagar and studied at Gujarat College, Ahmedabad where he developed anti-colonial views and refused to take his bachelor's degree (BA) upon graduation from a "foreign government". Inspired by Mahatma Gandhi, he joined the Indian National Congress in 1920 and took part in the non-cooperation movement. Mehta founded the Bhavnagar Praja Mandal to mobilize locals within Bhavnagar State against the British Indian authorities. He was imprisoned for two years for his activities during the 1930 civil disobedience movement.

After the independence of India, he was elected to the Lok Sabha, the lower house of the Parliament of India from Gohilwad, Gujarat as a member of the Indian National Congress. He was known as the "Architect of Panchayati Raj" due to his contributions towards democratic decentralisation.

== Early life ==
Balwantrai Gopalji Mehta was born on 19 February 1899 or 1900 in Bhavnagar to a middle-class Gujarati family. He studied up to B.A class, but refused to take the degree from the foreign government.

== Political career ==
He joined the national movement of non-co-operation in 1920. He founded Bhavnagar Praja Mandal in 1921 for carrying on the freedom movement in that state. He participated in the Civil Disobedience movement from 1930 to 1932. He also participated in Bardoli Satyagraha.

He was sentenced for three years imprisonment in Quit India Movement of 1942. He spent total seven years in prison during British colony. On Mahatma Gandhi's suggestion, he accepted membership of the Congress Working Committee.

When Jawaharlal Nehru became president of All India Congress Committee, he was elected its general secretary. He was twice elected, in 1952 Indian general Election and was again elected in 1957 Indian general election to the 2nd Lok Sabha from Gohilwad (Bhavnagar) Constituency.

He was the Chairman of Estimate committee of Parliament. He chaired the committee set up by Government of India in January 1957 to examine the working of the Community Development Programme and the National Extension Service and to suggest measures for their better working. The committee submitted its report in November 1957 and recommended the establishment of the scheme of 'democratic decentralisation' which finally came to be known as Panchayati Raj.

He also remained President of Servants of the People Society (Lok Sevak Mandal), a social service organisation founded by Lala Lajpat Rai, in 1921.

== Chief Minister ==
He succeeded Jivraj Narayan Mehta as the Chief Minister of Gujarat on 25 February 1963.

== Death ==
During the Second India–Pakistan War, on 19 September 1965, then serving chief minister Mehta flew in a Beechcraft commuter aircraft from Tata Chemicals, Mithapur to the Kutch border between India and Pakistan. The plane was piloted by Jahangir Engineer, a former Indian Air Force pilot. It was shot down by Pakistan Air Force pilot Qais Hussain, who assumed it to be a reconnaissance mission. Mehta died in the crash along with his wife, three members of his staff, a journalist and two crew members.

== Commemoration ==
The Department of Post, Government of India has issued a special postage stamp of face value INR 3.00 to commemorate his 100th birth anniversary on 17 February 2000.
