= National Development Council (India) =

Indian government agency

- Rashtriya Vikas Parishad
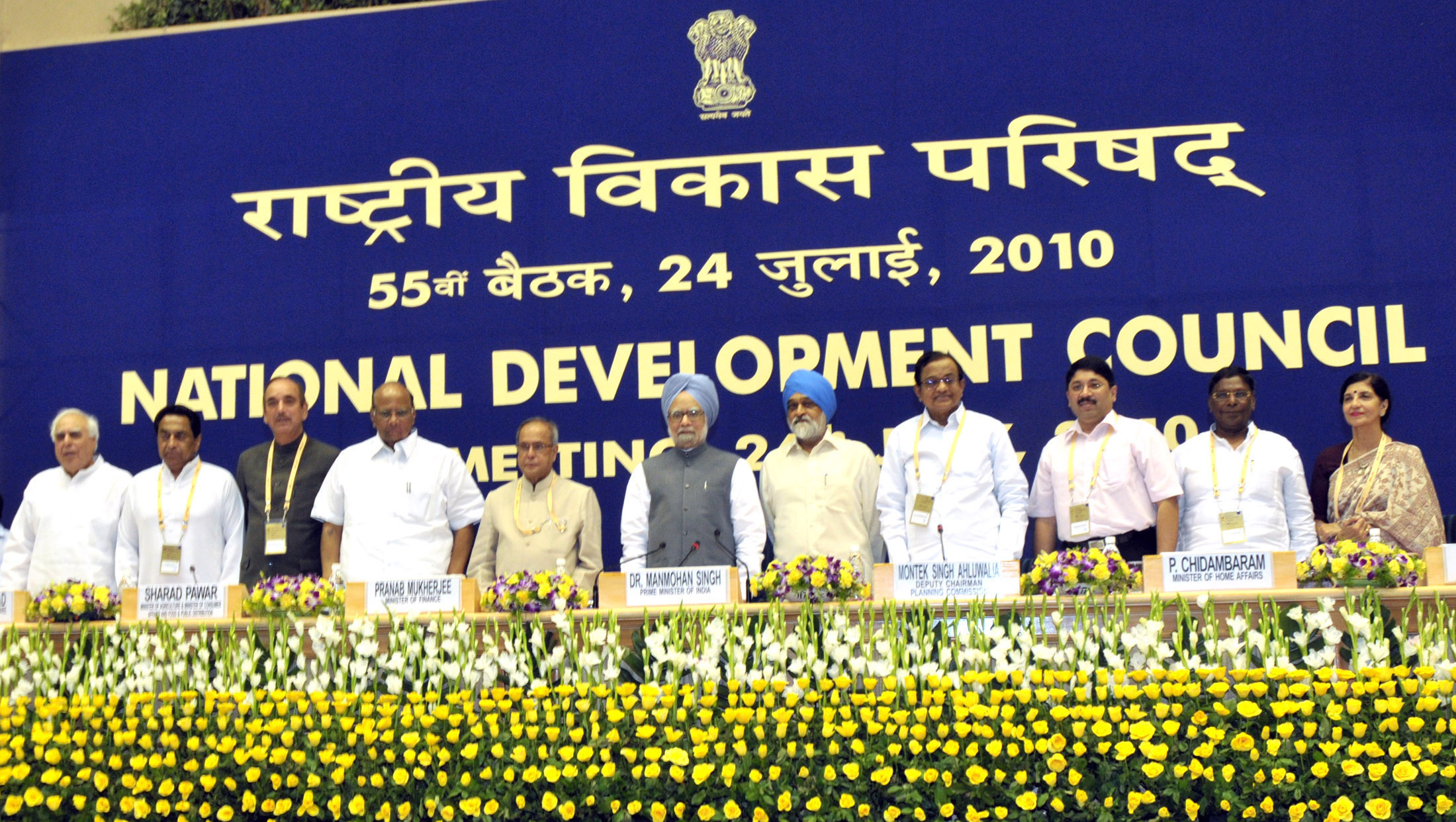

Agency overview
- Formed: 6th Aug 1952; 74 years ago
- Agency executive: Shri Narendra Modi, Prime Minister of India

The National Development Council (NDC) or Rashtriya Vikas Parishad is the apex body for decision creating and deliberations on development matters in India, presided over by the Prime Minister. It was set up on 6 August 1952 to strengthen and mobilize the effort and resources of the nation in support of the Five Year Plans made by Planning Commission, to promote common economic policies in all vital spheres, and to ensure the balanced and rapid development of all parts of the country. The Council comprises the Prime Minister, the Union Cabinet Ministers, Chief Ministers of all States or their substitutes, representatives of the Union Territories and the members of the NITI Aayog (erstwhile Planning Commission).

NDC (National Development Council) has been proposed to be abolished. But till date no resolution has been passed to abolish it. Since the inception of NITI Aayog's Governing Council (which has almost the same composition and roles as NDC), the NDC has had no work assigned to it nor did it have any meetings. During the tenure of former Prime Ministers Atal Bihari Vajpayee and Manmohan Singh it was felt that Planning Commission has outlived its life and needs some reform. In 2014, Prime Minister Narendra Modi announced Planning Commission's abolition and created NITI Aayog through an executive resolution. It is neither a constitutional body nor a statutory body.

== History ==
The first meeting was chaired by Prime Minister, Jawaharlal Nehru on 8–9 November 1952. So far 57 meetings had been held. The 57th Meeting of National Development Council was held on 27 December 2012 at Vidhan Bhavan, Mumbai.

== Objectives ==
It has been set up with the following objectives

1. to strengthen and mobilise the effort and resources of the nation in support of the Plan
2. to promote common economic policies in all vital spheres and
3. to ensure the balanced and rapid development of all parts of the country
4. to provide social amenities like education, medical care, social services, etc. to the citizens of the country
5. to improve in living standard of the people
6. to increase in per capita income

== Functions ==
The functions of the Council are

1. to prescribe guidelines for the formulation of the National Plan, including the assessment of resources for the Plan;
2. to consider the National Plan as formulated by the NITI Aayog;
3. to make an assessment of the resources that are required for implementing the Plan and to suggest measures for augmenting them.
4. To consider important questions of social and economic policy affecting national development; and
5. to review the working of the Plan from time to time and to recommend such measures as are necessary for achieving the aims and targets set out in the National Plan.
6. To recommend measures for achievement of the aims and targets set out in the national Plan.

== Composition ==
The National Development Council is presided over by the Prime Minister of India and includes all Union Ministers, Chief Ministers of all the States and Administrators of Union Territories and Members of the NITI Aayog. Ministers of State with independent charge are also invited to the deliberations of the Council.

The 58th meeting of NDC

Not yet held

The 57th meeting of NDC

Held on 27 December 2012 to discuss plan of(2012-2017)

The 56th meeting of NDC

The 56th meeting of NDC was held on 22 October 2011 to consider the 12th Plan approach paper. The meeting was presided over by Dr Manmohan Singh Prime Minister of India. Dr Montek Singh Ahluwalia, the Dy Chairman of Planning Commission, raised six major issues for consideration at the NDC:

1. Determining the state level five year plans for the Twelfth Plan period early and set targets for growth and other social indicators. They need to be built into consistent national targets for the Twelfth Plan. Create an economic environment that would support the efforts of farmers and entrepreneurs. It will determine much of the outcome in terms of the flow of investment to the State, and the growth of both output and employment.

2. Mobilization and allocation of resources for the Plan. Since inclusive growth depends on the development of rural and urban infrastructure, provision of health services extension of education and skill development, adequate provisioning shall be done for these sectors. Centre’s Gross Budgetary Support for the Plan as a ratio of GDP shall be increased while reducing the fiscal deficit. That requires raising of the ratio of tax revenues to GDP, and cut untargeted subsidies. States have to aim at much better revenue performance and also exercise progressive control over subsidies. Early implementation of the GST would not only raise more revenue for both the Centre and the States, it would also create a single market in the country and remove many of the distortions in the indirect tax system. Both the Centre and the States must explore the scope for public private partnership, wherever possible to leverage limited public resources.

3. Agriculture needs more attention and priority at State Government levels (e.g. exempting horticultural products entirely from the application of the APMC Act.)

4. Management of energy resources will be a major challenge because rapid growth will require a significant expansion in domestic energy supplies and also a much greater focus on energy efficiency. The viability of the power sector as a whole depends critically upon the financial viability of the distribution system. The total losses of the distribution system, if properly accounted, are probably as high as Rs 70,000 crores. If the States could cover these losses by subsidies, the system would not be at risk. However, state budgets cannot provide subsidies on this scale and the losses are effectively being funded by the banking system. AT&C losses shall be reduced to 15% by the end of the Twelfth Plan. The electricity tariffs have to be adjusted in line with costs. There is an urgent need to implement a package of distribution reforms combined with tariff increases, which will make the distribution companies viable for all additional sales. The Twelfth Plan version of the Accelerated Power Development Reform Programme should be tailored to provide resources to States taking credible steps along these lines. New energy efficient building standards should be made mandatory.

5. Management of water resources - demand for water in the country is outstripping supply, leading to serious water shortages and unsustainable drawal of ground water in many parts of the country. Whereas we increase the amount of water that is effectively available, the real solution lies in increasing the efficiency of water use. At present, almost 80% of our water is used in agriculture, and it is used very inefficiently. Water use in agriculture can be cut to half with known technology, e.g., by switching from flood irrigation of paddy to SRI. Water availability can be improved by treating sewage water before it enters our fresh water system. At present, only about 30% of sewage water is treated. There are similar problems with industrial effluents. With urbanisation and industrialisation set to accelerate, these pressures on our fresh water systems will increase. Corrective action in all these areas lies largely in the domain of state governments. The Approach paper called for a comprehensive re-examination of water policy including changes in the laws. It also calls for empowered water regulatory authorities which can ensure effective allocation of water to different uses and also different areas. Some States have introduced innovative schemes for rational use of water by involving farmers actively. Future assistance under AIBP should be linked to moves which ensure more rational use of water.

6. Improve implementation of Plan schemes on the ground. Over the past several years, we have greatly expanded the volume of resources devoted to various flagship programmes in health, education, clean drinking water, sanitation, area development programme, etc. The while these schemes focus on the right areas, their implementation leaves a great deal to be desired. Report of the Chaturvedi Committee made a number of recommendations on the need for streamlining the centrally sponsored schemes. Ways of improving governance, promoting innovation, extending e-governance to the panchayat level, introducing transparency in government programmes and use of the UID number combined with the benefits of IT become areas of priority. The Aadhar platform can be used to improve efficiency in many of these programmes. The Central Plan Scheme Monitoring System will be used to serve as a management information and decision support system which will enable tracking of the Central government disbursements under a Centrally Sponsored Scheme. There is a need to track funds from the State Governments down through different levels in the state Government to the final expenditure incurred at the implementing level.

== See also ==
- Planning Commission (India)
- NITI Aayog
- Inter State Council
