= List of aviation museums =

This is a list of aviation museums and museums that contain significant aerospace-related exhibits throughout the world. The aviation museums are listed alphabetically by country and their article name.

== Afghanistan ==
- OMAR Mine Museum, Kabul - includes a large collection of Soviet aircraft

== Argentina ==
- Argentine Naval Aviation Museum, Bahía Blanca
- Museo Nacional de Aeronáutica de Argentina, Morón

== Armenia ==
- Civil Aviation Museum, Zvartnots

== Australia ==
=== Australian Capital Territory ===
- Australian War Memorial, Canberra

=== New South Wales ===
- Australian Aviation Museum, Bankstown – closed
- Camden Museum of Aviation, Camden
- Luskintyre Aviation Flying Museum, Luskintyre
- Temora Aviation Museum, Temora
- Fighter World, RAAF Base Williamtown
- Narromine Aviation Museum, Narromine
- Historical Aircraft Restoration Society, Shellharbour Airport, Albion Park Rail and Parkes Airport, Parkes
- Fleet Air Arm Museum, Nowra
- Powerhouse Museum, Sydney
- RAAF Wagga Heritage Centre, Wagga Wagga

=== Northern Territory ===
- Central Australian Aviation Museum, Alice Springs
- Darwin Aviation Museum, Winnellie

=== Queensland ===
- Australian Army Flying Museum, Oakey
- Hinkler Hall of Aviation, Bundaberg
- Qantas Founders Museum, Longreach
- Queensland Air Museum, Caloundra
- RAAF Amberley Aviation Heritage Centre, Amberley
- RAAF Townsville Aviation Heritage Centre, Townsville

=== South Australia ===
- Greenock Aviation Museum, Greenock
- South Australian Aviation Museum, Port Adelaide

=== Victoria ===
- Australian Gliding Museum, Bacchus Marsh
- Australian National Aviation Museum, Moorabbin Airport
- B-24 Liberator Memorial Australia, Werribee
- Ballarat Aviation Museum, Ballarat
- Derelict Aircraft Museum, Launching Place – closed
- Drage Aviation Museum, Wangaratta – closed
- Friends of the Anson Air Museum, Ballarat
- Latrobe Flying Museum, Traralgon – closed
- RAAF Museum, RAAF Williams, Point Cook
- Sir Reginald Ansett Transport Museum, Hamilton

=== Western Australia ===
- Aviation Heritage Museum (Western Australia), Bull Creek
- Museum of Australian Commercial Aviation, Mount Barker

== Austria ==
- Austrian Aviation Museum, Bad Vöslau
- Flugmuseum Aviaticum, Wiener Neustadt
- Flying Bulls (Hangar-7), Salzburg
- Militärluftfahrtmuseum, Zeltweg
- Museum Fahrzeug - Technik - Luftfahrt, Bad Ischl
- Museum of Military History, Vienna
- Österreichisches Luftfahrtmuseum, Graz
- Vienna Museum of Science and Technology, Vienna

== Belarus ==
- Belarusian Aviation Museum, Borovaya
- "Stalin Line" museum, Zaslavl

== Belgium ==
- First Wing Historical Centre, Beauvechain Air Base
- Flying Legends Collection, Kortrijk
- Kleine-Brogel Air Force Museum, Kleine-Brogel
- Royal Museum of the Armed Forces and of Military History, Brussels
- Musée Spitfire, Florennes
- Stampe and Vertongen Museum, Antwerp

== Bolivia ==
- Bolivian Air Force Museum, El Alto

== Brazil ==
- Memorial Aeroespacial Brasileiro, São José dos Campos (SP)
- Museu Aeroespacial, Rio de Janeiro
- Museu da Aviação Naval, Sao Pedro da Aldeia
- Museu de Armas e Veículos e Avioes Motorizados Antigos, Bebedouro, São Paulo
- TAM Museum, São Carlos
- Museu Militar Brasileiro, Panambi (RS)

== Bulgaria ==
- Aviation and Air Force Museum, Krumovo
- Burgas Aviation Museum
- National Museum of Military History
- National Polytechnical Museum

== Burma ==
- Defence Services Museum, Nayptitaw, Burma

== Cambodia ==
- War Museum Cambodia, Siem Reap

== Canada ==
=== Alberta ===
- Alberta Aviation Museum, Edmonton
- Bomber Command Museum of Canada, Nanton
- Canada's Aviation Hall of Fame, Calgary
- Cold Lake Air Force Museum, Cold Lake
- Reynolds-Alberta Museum, Wetaskiwin
- The Hangar Flight Museum, Calgary

=== British Columbia ===
- British Columbia Aviation Museum, Sidney
- Canadian Museum of Flight, Langley
- Comox Air Force Museum, Comox
- KF Centre for Excellence, Kelowna

=== Manitoba ===
- Air Force Heritage Museum and Air Park, Winnipeg
- Canadian Starfighter Museum, St. Andrews Airport
- Commonwealth Air Training Plan Museum, Brandon
- Manitoba Military Aviation Museum, CFB Winnipeg
- Royal Aviation Museum of Western Canada, Winnipeg

=== New Brunswick ===
- New Brunswick Aviation Museum, Miramichi, New Brunswick

=== Newfoundland and Labrador ===
- North Atlantic Aviation Museum, Gander

=== Nova Scotia ===
- Atlantic Canada Aviation Museum, Halifax Regional Municipality
- Greenwood Military Aviation Museum, Greenwood
- Shearwater Aviation Museum, Shearwater

=== Ontario ===
- Canada Aviation and Space Museum, Ottawa
- Canadian Air and Space Conservancy, Edenvale
- Canadian Aviation Museum, Windsor
- Canadian Bushplane Heritage Centre, Sault Ste. Marie
- Canadian Warplane Heritage Museum, Hamilton
- Great War Flying Museum, Brampton
- Jet Aircraft Museum, London
- Memorial Military Museum, Campbellford
- National Air Force Museum of Canada, CFB Trenton
- No. 6 RCAF Dunnville Museum, Dunnville, Ontario

=== Quebec ===
- Montreal Aviation Museum, Macdonald Campus, McGill University, Montréal
- Musée de la Défense aérienne, CFB Bagotville
- Quebec Aerospace Museum, St-Hubert
- Vintage Wings of Canada, Gatineau

=== Saskatchewan ===
- Saskatchewan Aviation Museum, Saskatoon, Saskatchewan
- Saskatchewan Western Development Museum, Moose Jaw, Saskatchewan

== Chile ==
- Museo Nacional Aeronáutico y del Espacio, Santiago
- Chilean Naval Aviation Museum, Viña del Mar

== China ==
- Aviation Discovery Centre, Hong Kong, Hong Kong
- Aviation Museum of Guangzhou Aviation Technology Institute, Guangzhou
- Beijing Air and Space Museum, previously known as Beijing Aviation Museum, Beijing
- Chinese Aviation Museum, Datangshan, Changping District, Beijing
- Chinese Space Museum, Donggaodi, Fengtai District, Beijing
- Civil Aviation Museum of China, Chaoyang District, Beijing
- Hong Kong Space Museum, Kowloon, Hong Kong
- Military Museum of the Chinese People's Revolution, Beijing
- Shanghai Aerospace Enthusiasts Center, Shanghai
- Shenyang Aircraft Corporation Museum, Shenyang
- Yanliang Aviation Science and Technology Museum, Yanliang District, Xi'an

== Colombia ==
- Colombian Aerospace Museum, Tocancipá
- Museo Militar de Colombia, Bogotá
- Museo Nacional de Transporte, Cali

== Croatia ==
- Nikola Tesla Technical Museum, Zagreb

== Cuba ==
- Museo del Aire, Havana
- Museo Giron, Matanzas
- Museo de la Revolución, Havana

== Czech Republic ==
- Air Park Zruč u Plzně, Zruč-Senec
- Muzeum letecké a pozemní techniky Vyškov, Vyškov
- Prague Aviation Museum, Kbely, Prague-Kbely
- National Technical Museum (Prague), Prague
- Letecké muzeum v Kunovicích, Kunovice
- Technicke Muzeum, Brno
- Letecké muzeum Metoděje Vlacha, Mladá Boleslav

== Denmark ==
- Danmarks Flymuseum, Stauning
- Flyvestation Karup's Historiske Forening Museet, Karup
- Aalborg Defence and Garrison Museum, Aalborg
- Springeren - Marine Experience Center, Aalborg
- Egeskov Castle, Egeskov
- Danmarks Tekniske Museum, Helsingør

== Ecuador ==
- Museo Aeronáutico y Del Espacio, Quito

== El Salvador ==
- Museo Nacional de Aviación, Ilopango

== Estonia ==
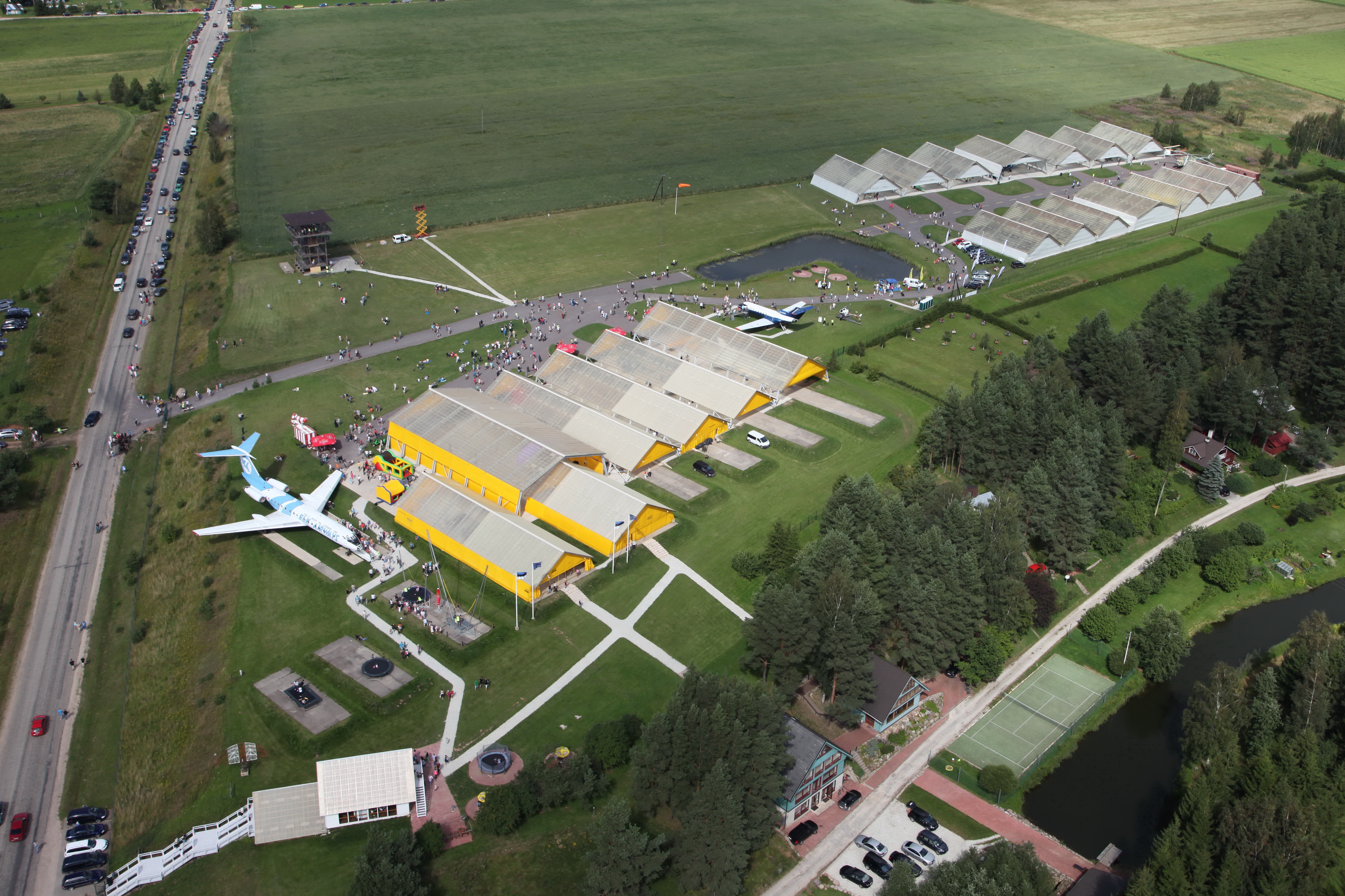
Estonian Aviation Museum in 2012

- Estonian Aviation Museum, Tartu

== Finland ==
- Aviation Museum of Central Finland
- Aviation Museum of South-Eastern Finland
- Finnish Aviation Museum
- Hallinportti Aviation Museum
- Karhulan ilmailukerho Aviation Museum
- Päijänne Tavastia Aviation Museum

== France ==
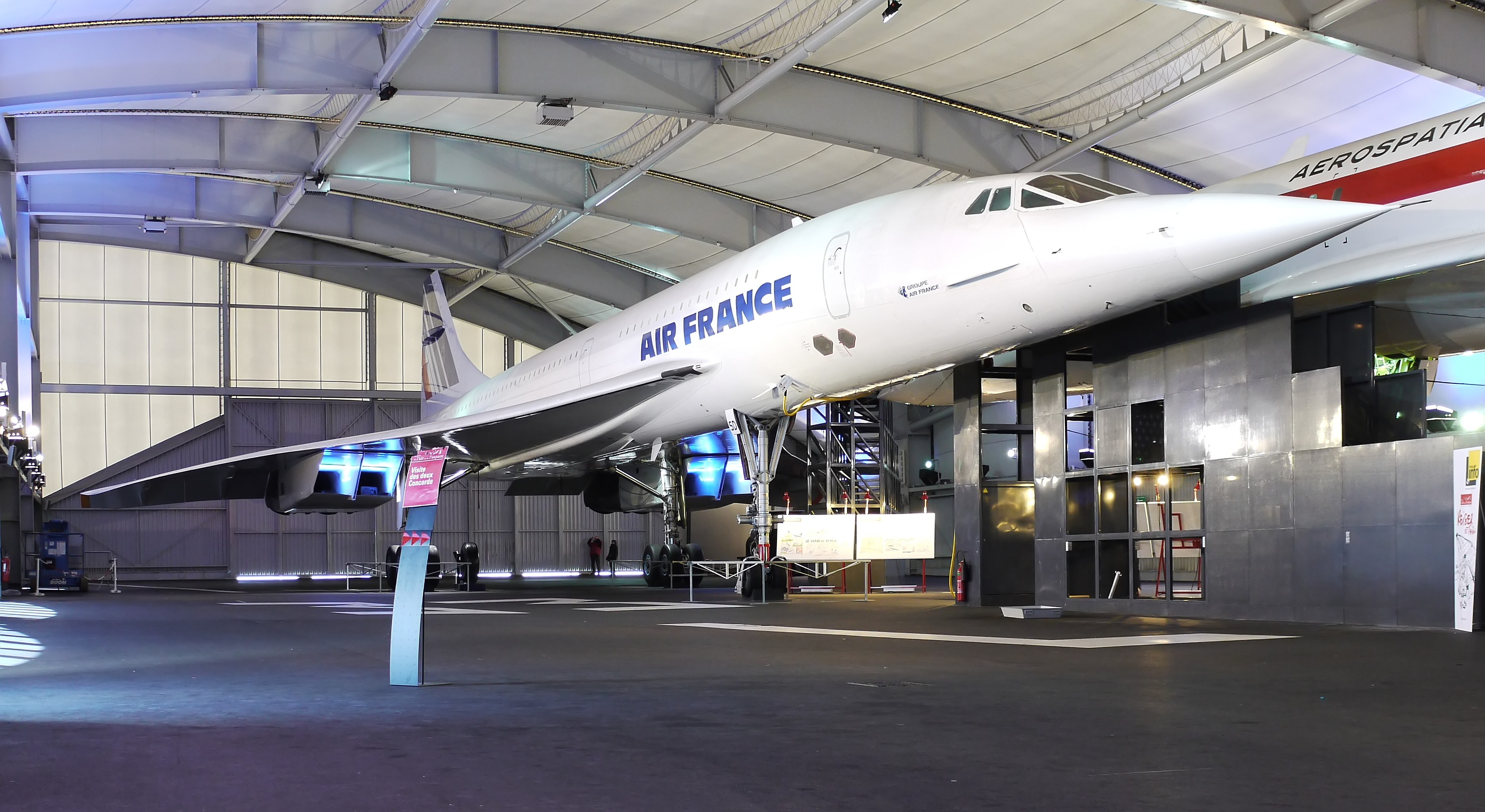
Prototype of Concorde in Musée de l'Air et de l'Espace

- Ailes Anciennes Toulouse, Toulouse
- Aeroscopia, Blagnac
- Airborne Museum, Sainte Mere Eglise
- Centre d'Etudes et de Loisirs Aerospatiaux de Grenoble, le Versoud
- Conservatoire d'Aéronefs Non Opérationnels Préservés et Exposés, Châteaudun
- Conservatoire l'Air et l'Espace d'Acquitane, Bordeaux-Merignac
- Le Memorial de Caen Museum, Caen
- L'Envol des pionniers, Toulouse
- L'Epopee de l'Industrie et de l'Aéronautique, Albert
- Musée Aéronautique du Berry, Touchay
- Musée Aéronautique de Cornouailles, Plobannalec-Lesconil
- Musée aéronautique et spatial Safran, Melun
- Musée ALAT, Dax
- Musée de la base aerienne 112 et de l'aeronautique locale, Reims
- Musée de l'Air et de l'Espace, Le Bourget Airport, Paris
- Musée de l'Aviation, Perpignan
- Musée de l'Aviation, Saint-Victoret
- Musée des Arts et Métiers, Paris
- Musée des Parachutistes, Pau
- Musée de Tradition de l'Aéronautique Navale, Rochefort
- Musée du Chateau Sávigny-lès-Beaune, Savigny-lès-Beaune
- Musée Européen de l'Aviation de Chasse, Montélimar - Ancône Airport
- Musée Historique de l'Hydraviation, Biscarrosse
- Musée Régional de l'Air, Angers - Loire Airport
- Musée Volant Salis, la Ferte-Alais

== Germany ==
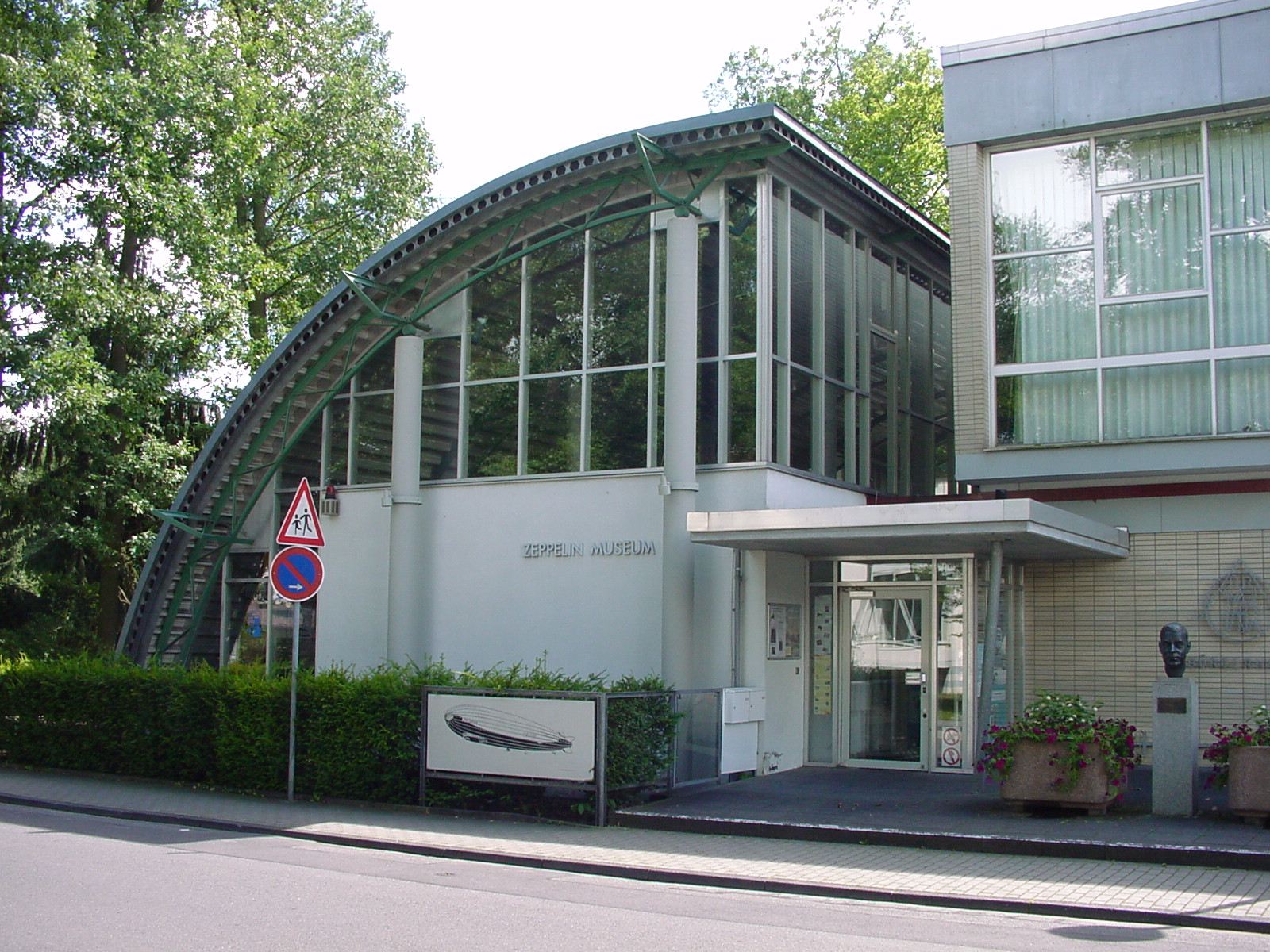
Zeppelin Museum Zeppelinheim, Frankfurt am Main

=== Bavaria ===
- Gustav Weisskopf Museum, Leutershausen
- Ballonmuseum Gersthofen, Gersthofen
- Deutsches Fahrzeugmuseum, Fichtelberg
- Deutsches Museum, Munich
- Deutsches Museum Flugwerft Schleissheim, Oberschleissheim
- Fliegerhorstmuseum Leipheim, Leipheim
- Flieger-Stadl e.V., Flugplatz Landshut, Landshut
- Flugmuseum Messerschmitt, Manching
- Gerhard Neumann Museum, Niederalteich
- Hermann Oberth Space Travel Museum, Feucht, near Nuremberg
- Schwäbisches Bauern- und Technikmuseum, Seifertshofen, Eschach

=== Baden-Württemberg ===
- Albert Sammt Zeppelin Museum, Niederstetten
- Deutsch-Kanadisches Luftwaffenmuseum, Karlsruhe/Baden-Baden Airport
- Dornier Museum Friedrichshafen, Friedrichshafen
- Internationales Luftfahrt-Museum, Schwenningen
- Sinsheim Auto & Technik Museum, Sinsheim
- Zeppelin Museum Friedrichshafen, Friedrichshafen
- Zeppelin Museum Meersburg, Meersburg

=== Berlin ===
- Deutsche Luftfahrtsammlung, Berlin – closed
- German Museum of Technology, Berlin
- Luftwaffenmuseum der Bundeswehr, Berlin

=== Brandenburg ===
- Flugplatzmuseum Cottbus, Cottbus
- Hans-Grade-Museum, Borkheide
- Luftfahrthistorische Sammlung Finow, Finowfurt
- Otto-Lilienthal-Verein Stölln e.V., Stölln
- Flugplatzmuseum Strausberg, Strausberg

=== Hesse ===
- Deutsches Segelflugmuseum mit Modellflug, Gersfeld
- Grenzmuseum, Asbach-Sickenberg
- Zeppelin Museum Zeppelinheim, Frankfurt am Main

=== Lower Saxony ===
- Aeronauticum, Nordholz
- Aviation Museum Hannover-Laatzen, Laatzen
- Hubschrauber Museum, Buckeburg
- Traditionsgemeinschaft Lufttransport Wunstorf, Wunstorf

=== Mecklenburg-Vorpommern ===
- Historisch-Technisches Informationszentrum, Peenemuende
- Interessenverein Luftfahrt Neuenkirchen, Neuenkirchen
- Luftfahrttechnisches Museum Rechlin, Rechlin
- Otto-Lilienthal-Museum, Anklam

=== North Rhine-Westphalia ===
- Motor Technica Museum, Bad Oeynhausen – closed

=== Rhineland-Palatinate ===
- Flugausstellung Peter Junior, Hermeskeil
- Technik Museum Speyer, Speyer
- Bundeswehr Museum of German Defense Technology, Koblenz

=== Saxony ===
- Aero Park Leipzig, Leipzig/Halle Airport (closed)
- German Space Travel Exhibition, Morgenröthe-Rautenkranz
- Fliegendes Museum Historische Flugzeuge Josef Koch, Großenhain Airport (renamed to Flieger-Stadl e.V. and moved to Landshut
- Luftfahrttechnisches Museum Rothenburg, Rothenburg
- Bundeswehr Military History Museum, Dresden

=== Saxony-Anhalt ===
- Luftfahrt- und Technik-Museumspark Merseburg, Merseburg
- Museum für Luftfahrt und Technik, Wernigerode
- Technikmuseum Hugo Junkers, Dessau

=== Thuringia ===
- Flugwelt Altenburg-Nobitz, Leipzig–Altenburg Airport

== Greece ==
- Hellenic Air Force Museum, Dekeleia
- Ministry of National Defence War Museum, Thessaloniki
- War Museum, Athens

== Honduras ==
- Honduran Aviation Museum, Tegucigalpa

== Hungary ==
- Aeropark, Budapest Ferenc Liszt International Airport, Budapest
- Budapest Transport Museum, City Park, Budapest
- Museum of Hungarian Aviation, Szolnok
- Museum 'Secrets of the Soviet airbase', Berekfurdo

== Iceland ==
- Aviation Museum of Iceland, Akureyri

== India ==
- HAL Aerospace Museum, Bangalore
- Indian Air Force Heritage Museum, Chandigarh
- Indian Air Force Museum, Palam
- Naval Aviation Museum, Dabolim
- Pragati Aerospace Museum, Ozar
- TU 142 Aircraft Museum, Visakhapatnam

== Indonesia ==
- Dirgantara Mandala Museum, Yogyakarta

== Iran ==
- Iranian Air Force Museum, Doshan Tappeh Air Base
- Military Museum, Tehran
- Tehran Aerospace Exhibition Center, Tehran

== Ireland ==
- Air Corps Museum, Baldonnel
- Foynes Flying Boat Museum, Foynes
- Shannon Aviation Museum, Shannon

== Israel ==
- Air and Space Museum Rishon LeZion, Rishon LeZion
- Haifa Airport Museum, Haifa
- Israeli Air Force Museum, Hatzerim

== Italy ==
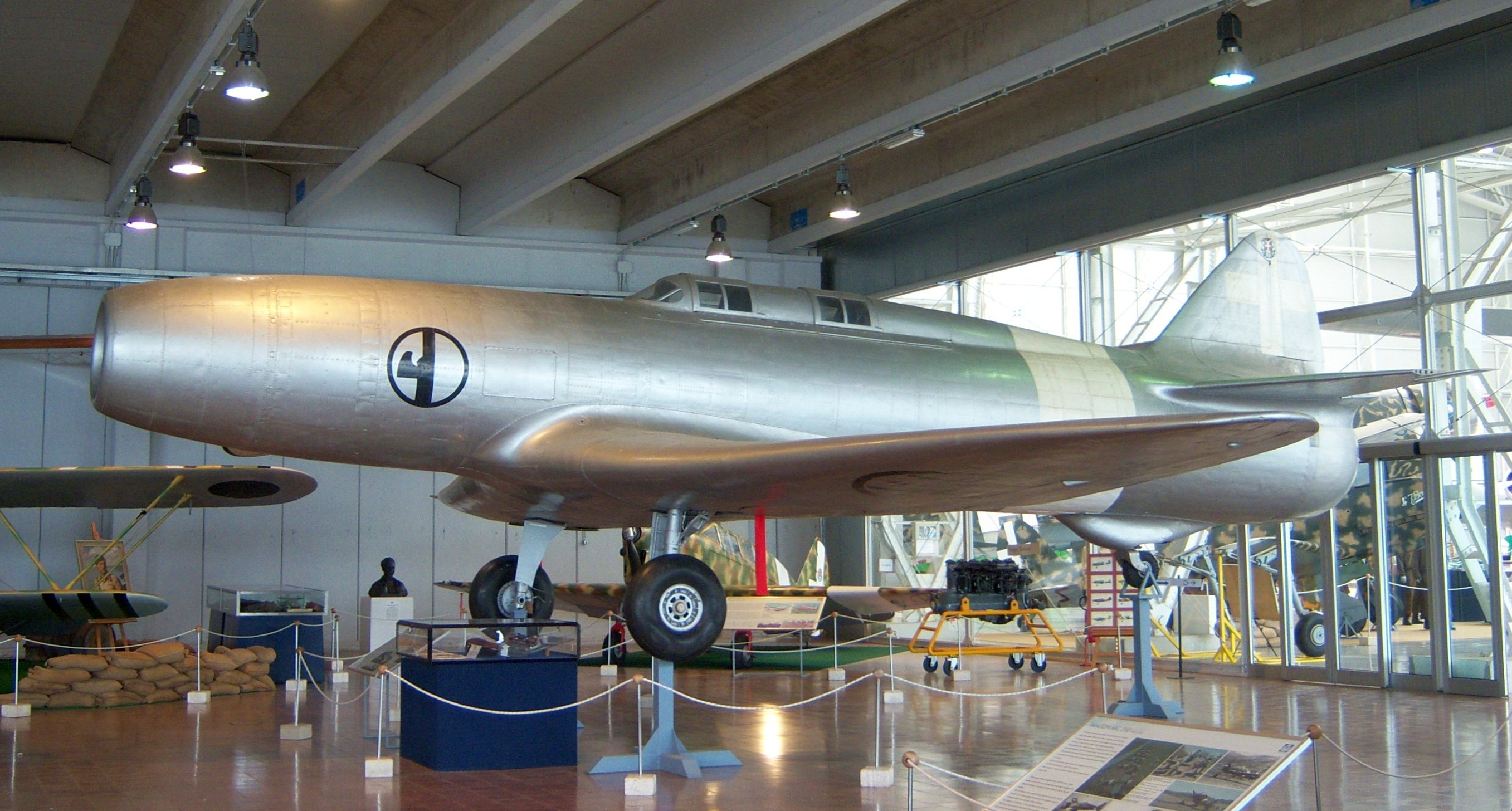
Campini-Caproni C.C.2 in the Italian Air Force Museum.

- Gianni Caproni Museum of Aeronautics
- Italian Air Force Museum, Vigna di Valle, Bracciano
- Museo Aeroportuale Cameri Air Base Museum, Cameri
- Museo Agusta, Cascina Costa
- Museo dell'Aeronautica Gianni Caproni, Trento
- Museo dell'Aria e dello Spazio, Castello di San Pelagio
- Museo Nazionale della Scienza e della Tecnologia "Leonardo da Vinci", Milan
- Museum of Engines and Mechanisms, Palermo
- Parco Tematico & Museo dell'Aviazione, Rimini
- Volandia, Milan-Malpensa Airport

== Japan ==
Tokorozawa Aviation Museum in Kōkūkōen Park. Japan's first airfield can be seen in the grassy area lined with bushes with the museum behind

- Aichi Museum of Flight, Nagoya, Aichi
- Bihoro Aviation Park, Bihoro, Hokkaido
- Hamamatsu Air Park (Hamamatsu Air Base), Hamamatsu, Shizuoka
- Hirosawa Aviation Museum, Chikusei, Ibaraki
- Ishikawa Aviation Plaza, Komatsu, Ishikawa
- Kakamigahara Air and Space Museum, Kakamigahara, Gifu
- Kanoya Air Base Museum, Kanoya, Kagoshima
- Kawaguchiko Motor Museum, Narusawa, Yamanashi
- Misawa Aviation & Science Museum, Misawa, Aomori
- Modern Transportation Museum, Osaka – closed
- Museum of Aeronautical Science, Shibayama, Chiba
- Shuubudai Museum, Iruma Air Base
- Tokorozawa Aviation Museum, Tokorozawa, Saitama

== Laos ==
- Lao People's Army History Museum, Vientiane

== Latvia ==
- Riga Aviation Museum

== Lebanon ==
- Lebanon Air Force Museum, Rayak

== Lithuania ==
- Įstra Aviation Museum, Paįstrys
- Lithuanian Aviation Museum, Kaunas

== Malaysia ==
- Malaysia Air Force Museum, Kuala Lumpur

== Malta ==
- Malta Aviation Museum, Ta' Qali

== Mexico ==
- Museo del Concorde, Ciudad Juárez, Chihuahua
- Mexican Air Force Museum

== Nepal ==
- Aircraft Museum Dhangadhi, Dhangadhi
- Aircraft Museum Kathmandu, Kathmandu

== Netherlands ==
- Aviodrome, Lelystad Airport, Lelystad
- Crash Luchtoorlog- en Verzetsmuseum, Aalsmeerderbrug
- Gyrocopter Aviation Historisch Museum, Midden-Zeeland Airport, Middelburg
- Luchtvaart & Oorlogs Museum Texel, De Cocksdorp
- Militaire Luchtvaart Museum, Soesterberg – closed
- Nationaal Militair Museum, Soesterberg
- Nederlands Transport Museum, Nieuw-Vennep
- Overloon War Museum, Overloon
- Space Expo, Noordwijk
- Stichting Koninklijke Luchtmacht Historische Vlucht, Gilze-Rijen Air Base, Breda
- Vliegend Museum Seppe, Seppe Airport, Hoeven
- VroegeVogels, Lelystad Airport
- Wings of Liberation, Best

== New Zealand ==
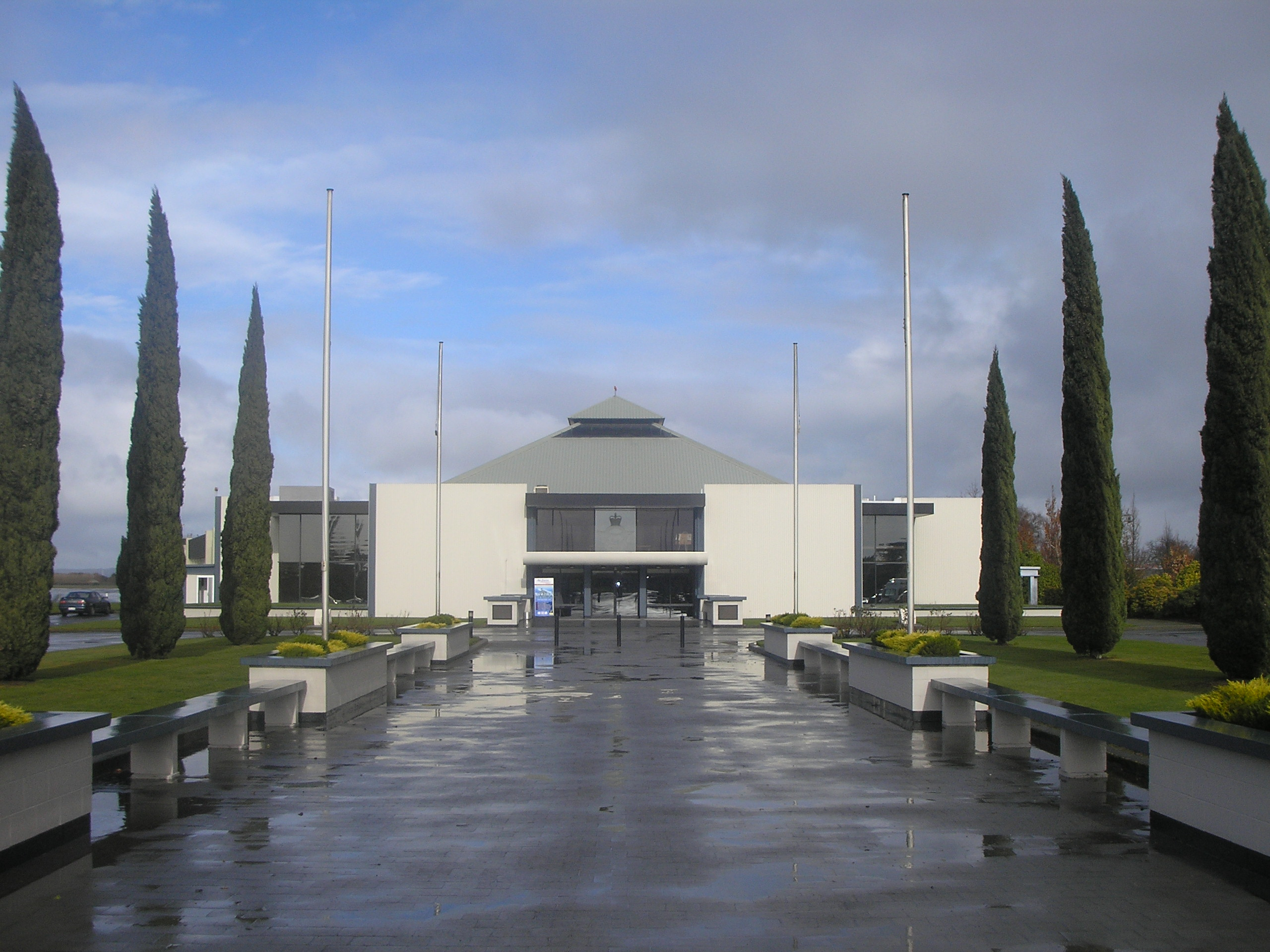
Air Force Museum of New Zealand, Christchurch

- Air Force Museum of New Zealand, Christchurch
- Ashburton Aviation Museum, Ashburton
- Classic Flyers Museum, Tauranga Airport, Mount Maunganui
- New Zealand Fighter Pilots Museum, Wanaka Airport
- Museum of Transport and Technology, Auckland
- Omaka Aviation Heritage Centre, Blenheim, New Zealand
- Warbirds and Wheels, Wanaka

== Nigeria ==
- Nigerian War Museum

== Norway ==
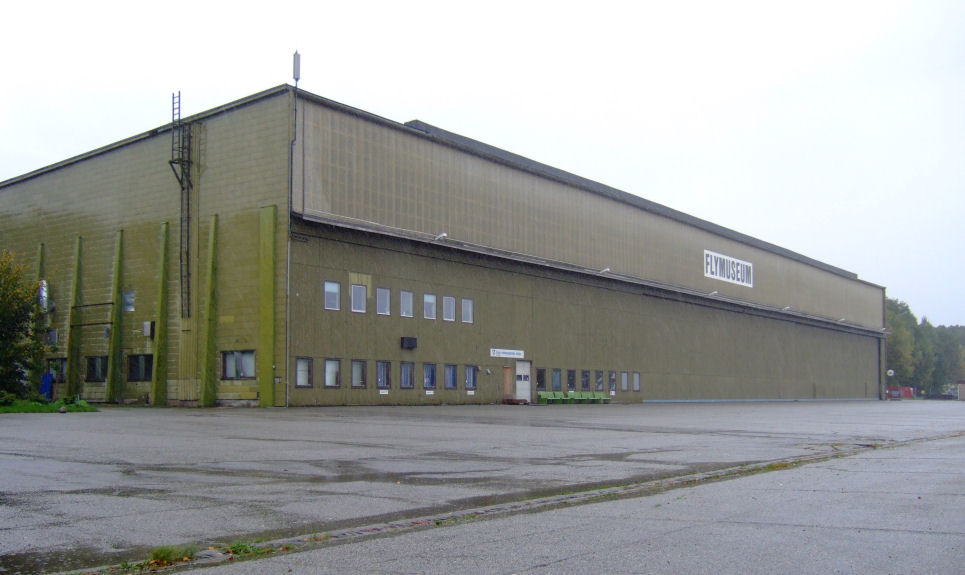
Flyhistorisk Museum, Sola

- Flyhistorisk Museum, Sola, Stavanger
- Norsk Teknisk Museum, Oslo
- Norwegian Armed Forces Aircraft Collection, Gardermoen
- Norwegian Aviation Museum, Bodø
- Spitsbergen Airship Museum

== Pakistan ==
- Pakistan Air Force Museum, Karachi

== Peru ==
- Museo Aeronáutico del Perú, Lima

== Philippines ==
- Philippine Air Force Aerospace Museum,Pasay
- Philippine Airline Museum, Pasay

== Poland ==
Aerospace museums

- Polish Aviation Museum, Kraków
- Polish Air Force Museum, Dęblin

Other museums with aerospace exhibits:

- Polish Army Museum, Warsaw (large collection)
  - Museum of Polish Military Technology, Warsaw (large collection)

== Portugal ==
- Museu do Ar, Alverca and Sintra
- Museu Aero Fénix, Santarém and Alverca
- Navy Museum, Lisbon

== Romania ==
- National Museum of Romanian Aviation, Bucharest
- National Military Museum, Bucharest

== Russia ==
- Central Air Force Museum, Monino
- Central Armed Forces Museum, Moscow
- Central House of Aviation and Cosmonautics DOSAAF of Russia, Moscow
- Gagarin Museum of Aviation and Cosmonautics History, Izhevsk
- Kurgan Aviation Museum, Kurgan
- Long Range Aviation Museum, Ryazan
- Memorial Museum of Cosmonautics, Moscow
- Memorial Museum of V.P. Chkalov, Chkalov
- Museum of History and Labor Glory Ukhtomskogo helicopter plant named after N.I. Kamov, Lyubertsy, Moscow Oblast
- Museum of Naval Aviation of Northern Fleet, Safonovo, Murmansk Oblast
- Museum of the History of aviation engine and repair, Gatchina, Leningrad Oblast
- Museum of Stalingrad battle, Volgograd
- Museum of Military Transport Aviation, Ivanovo
- Perm Aviation Museum, Perm
- RKK Energiya museum, Korolyov, Moscow Oblast
- Taganrog Aviation Museum, Taganrog
- Technical Museum of Vadim Zadorozhny, Krasnogorsky District, Moscow Oblast
- Torzok Aviation Museum, Torzok
- Tsiolkovsky State Museum of the History of Cosmonautics, Kaluga
- Ulyanovsk Aircraft Museum, Ulyanovsk
- UMMC Museum Complex, Verkhnyaya Pyshma

== Saudi Arabia ==
- Saqr Al Jazeera Aviation Museum, Riyadh

== Serbia ==
- Aeronautical Museum

== Singapore ==
- Singapore Air Force Museum, Paya Lebar

== Slovakia ==
- Museum of Aviation, Košice
- Vojenske Historicke Muzeum, Piešťany

== Slovenia ==
- Park of Military History, Pivka

== South Africa ==
- Pioneers of Aviation Museum, Kimberley, Northern Cape
- South African Air Force Museum, Pretoria, Port Elizabeth and Cape Town
- South African Airways Museum, Gauteng

== South Korea ==
- Jeju Aerospace Museum, Jeju Island
- KAI Aerospace Museum, Sacheon
- National Aviation Museum of Korea, Gimpo
- War Memorial of Korea, Seoul

== Spain ==
- Elder Museum of Science and Technology, Las Palmas
- Fundación Infante d´Orleans, Madrid
- Museo de Aeropuertos y Transporte Aéreo, Málaga
- Museo del Aire (Aeronautics and Astronautics Museum of Spain), Cuatro Vientos
- Parc Aeronàutic de Catalunya, Sabadell, Barcelona

== Sri Lanka ==
- Sri Lanka Air Force Museum, Ratmalana

== Sweden ==
- Arlanda Flygsamlingar, Stockholm Arlanda Airport
- Aeroseum, Gothenburg City Airport, Gothenburg
- Ängelholms Flygmuseum, Ängelholm
- F 15 Flygmuseum, Söderhamn
- Flygmuseet F 21, Luleå
- Flygvapenmuseum, Linköping
- Gotlands försvarsmuseum, Visby
- Optand Teknikland, Östersund
- Svedinos Bil- och Flygmuseum, Ugglarp
- Västerås Flygmuseum, Västerås

== Switzerland ==
- Clin d'Ailes, Payerne
- Flieger Flab Museum, Dübendorf
- Fliegermuseum, Altenrhein
- Swiss Museum of Transport, Lucerne

== Taiwan ==
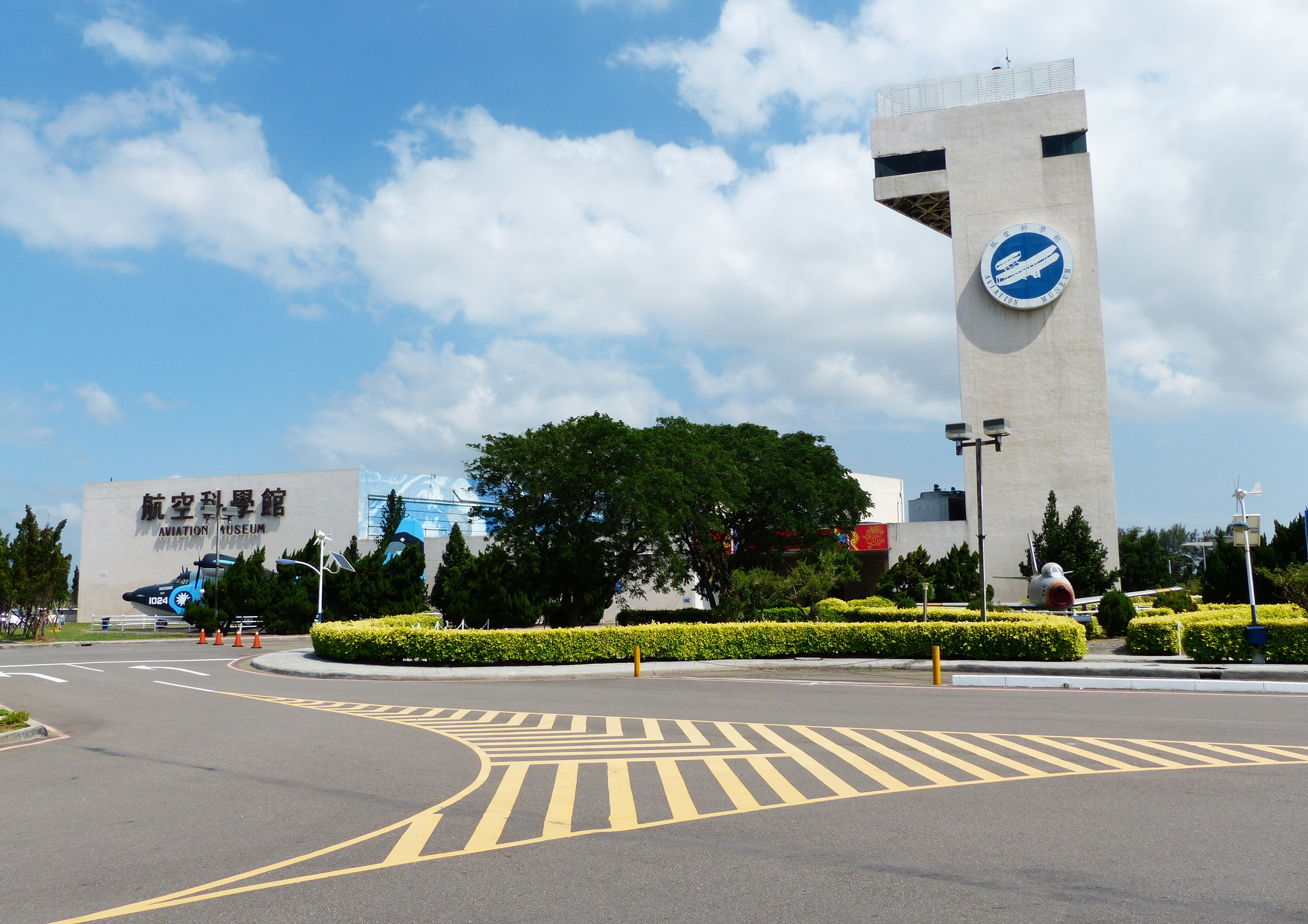
Chung Cheng Aviation Museum, Taoyuan City

- Chung Cheng Aviation Museum, Taoyuan – closed
- Republic of China Air Force Museum, Kaohsiung

== Thailand ==
- Royal Thai Air Force Museum, Bangkok

== Turkey ==
- Ankara Aviation Museum, Ankara
- Eskişehir Aviation Museum, Eskişehir
- Istanbul Aeronautics Museum, Istanbul
- Kutahya Aviation Museum, Kutahya
- M.S.Ö. Air & Space Museum, Sivrihisar
- Rahmi M. Koç Museum, Istanbul

== Ukraine ==
- Aviation Technical Museum, Luhansk
- Boguslaev Museum of Technology, Zaporizhzhia
- Konotop Aviation Museum, Konotop
- Museum of the Air Force of the Armed Forces of Ukraine, Vinnytsia
- Museum of the Antonov Company History, Kyiv
- Museum of Space Exploration, Pereiaslav
- Poltava Museum of Long-Range and Strategic Aviation, Poltava
- Sergei Pavlovich Korolyov Museum of Cosmonautics, Zhytomyr
- Ukraine State Aviation Museum, Kyiv
- Voronovytskyi Museum of the History of Aviation and Cosmonautics, Voronovitsa

== United Arab Emirates ==
- Al Mahatta Museum, Sharjah

== United Kingdom ==
=== England ===
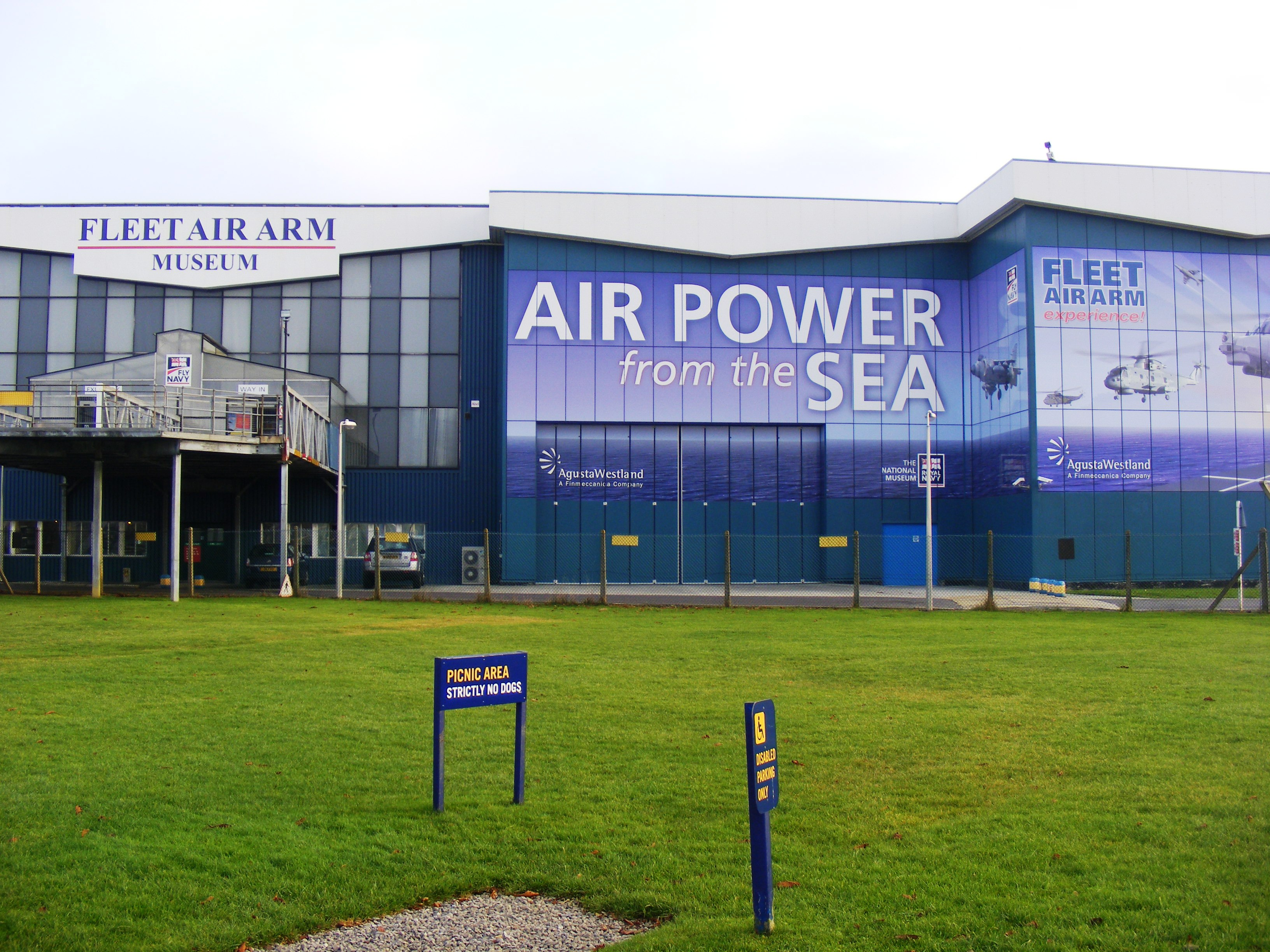
Fleet Air Arm Museum

- Aeropark, East Midlands Airport, Castle Donington, Leicestershire
- Aerospace Bristol, Filton, Gloucestershire
- Army Flying Museum, Middle Wallop, Hampshire
- Avro Heritage Museum, Woodford, Greater Manchester
- Battle of Britain Memorial Flight, RAF Coningsby, Lincolnshire
- Bentwaters Cold War Museum, Woodbridge, Suffolk
- Bournemouth Aviation Museum, Hurn, Dorset
- Boscombe Down Aviation Collection, Old Sarum, Wiltshire
- Brooklands Museum, Weybridge, Surrey
- City of Norwich Aviation Museum, Norwich International Airport, Norfolk
- Cornwall Aviation Heritage Centre, Newquay, Cornwall – closed
- Cranwell Aviation Heritage Museum, North Rauceby, Lincolnshire
- Croydon Airport Visitor Centre, Croydon, Greater London
- de Havilland Aircraft Museum, London Colney, Hertfordshire
- Farnborough Air Sciences Trust, Farnborough, Hampshire
- Fleet Air Arm Museum, Yeovilton, Somerset
- Gatwick Aviation Museum, Charlwood, Surrey
- Gliding Heritage Centre, Lasham Airfield, Hampshire
- Imperial War Museum Duxford, Cambridge, Cambridgeshire
- Jet Age Museum, Gloucester
- Kent Battle of Britain Museum, Folkestone, Kent
- Lashenden Air Warfare Museum, Headcorn, Kent
- Lincolnshire Aviation Heritage Centre, East Kirkby, Lincolnshire
- Midland Air Museum, Coventry, Warwickshire
- Museum of Berkshire Aviation, Woodley, Berkshire
- Newark Air Museum, Nottinghamshire
- Norfolk and Suffolk Aviation Museum, Flixton, Suffolk
- North East Land, Sea and Air Museums, Sunderland, Tyne and Wear
- North Lincolnshire Aviation Heritage Centre, Hibaldstow, Lincolnshire
- RAF Biggin Hill Museum & Chapel, Biggin Hill, Kent
- RAF Bircham Newton Heritage Centre, Kings Lynn, Norfolk
- RAF Burtonwood Heritage Centre, Warrington, Cheshire
- RAF Coltishall Heritage Centre, Scottow, Norfolk
- RAF Hornchurch Heritage Centre, Hornchurch, London
- RAF Ingham Heritage Centre, Fillingham, Lincolnshire
- RAF Manston History Museum, Manston, Kent
- RAF Marham Aviation Heritage Centre, Kings Lynn, Norfolk
- RAF Regiment Heritage Centre, Thetford, Norfolk
- RAF Scampton Heritage Centre, Scampton, Lincolnshire
- RAF Sculthorpe Heritage Centre, Wicken Green, Norfolk
- RAF Waddington Heritage Centre, Waddington, Lincolnshire
- Rolls-Royce Heritage Trust, Derby, Derbyshire
- Royal Air Force Museum London, Hendon, London
- Royal Air Force Museum Cosford, Cosford, Shropshire
- Science and Industry Museum, Manchester
- Science Museum, London SW7
- Shoreham Airport Visitor Centre, Shoreham Airport, West Sussex
- Shoreham Aircraft Museum, Shoreham, Kent
- Shuttleworth Collection, Old Warden, Bedfordshire
- Solent Sky, Southampton, Hampshire
- Solway Aviation Museum, Carlisle Lake District Airport, Cumbria
- South Yorkshire Aircraft Museum, Doncaster, South Yorkshire
- Sywell Aviation Museum, Northamptonshire
- Tangmere Military Aviation Museum, Tangmere, West Sussex
- The Helicopter Museum, Weston-super-Mare, Somerset
- Trenchard Museum, RAF Halton, Wendover, Buckinghamshire
- Thinktank, Birmingham Science Museum, Birmingham, West Midlands
- Wings Museum, Balcombe, West Sussex
- Yorkshire Air Museum, Elvington, North Yorkshire

=== Isle of Man ===
- Manx Aviation and Military Museum, Castletown

=== Northern Ireland ===
- Ulster Aviation Society, Lisburn
- Ulster Folk and Transport Museum, Belfast

=== Scotland ===
- Dumfries and Galloway Aviation Museum, Dumfries
- Montrose Air Station Museum, Angus
- Morayvia, Kinloss
- National Museum of Flight, East Fortune, East Lothian
- Rolls-Royce Heritage Trust, Inchinnan, Renfrewshire

=== Wales ===
- Caernarfon Airworld Aviation Museum, Caernarfon, Gwynedd
- South Wales Aviation Museum, St Athan, Vale of Glamorgan

== United States ==
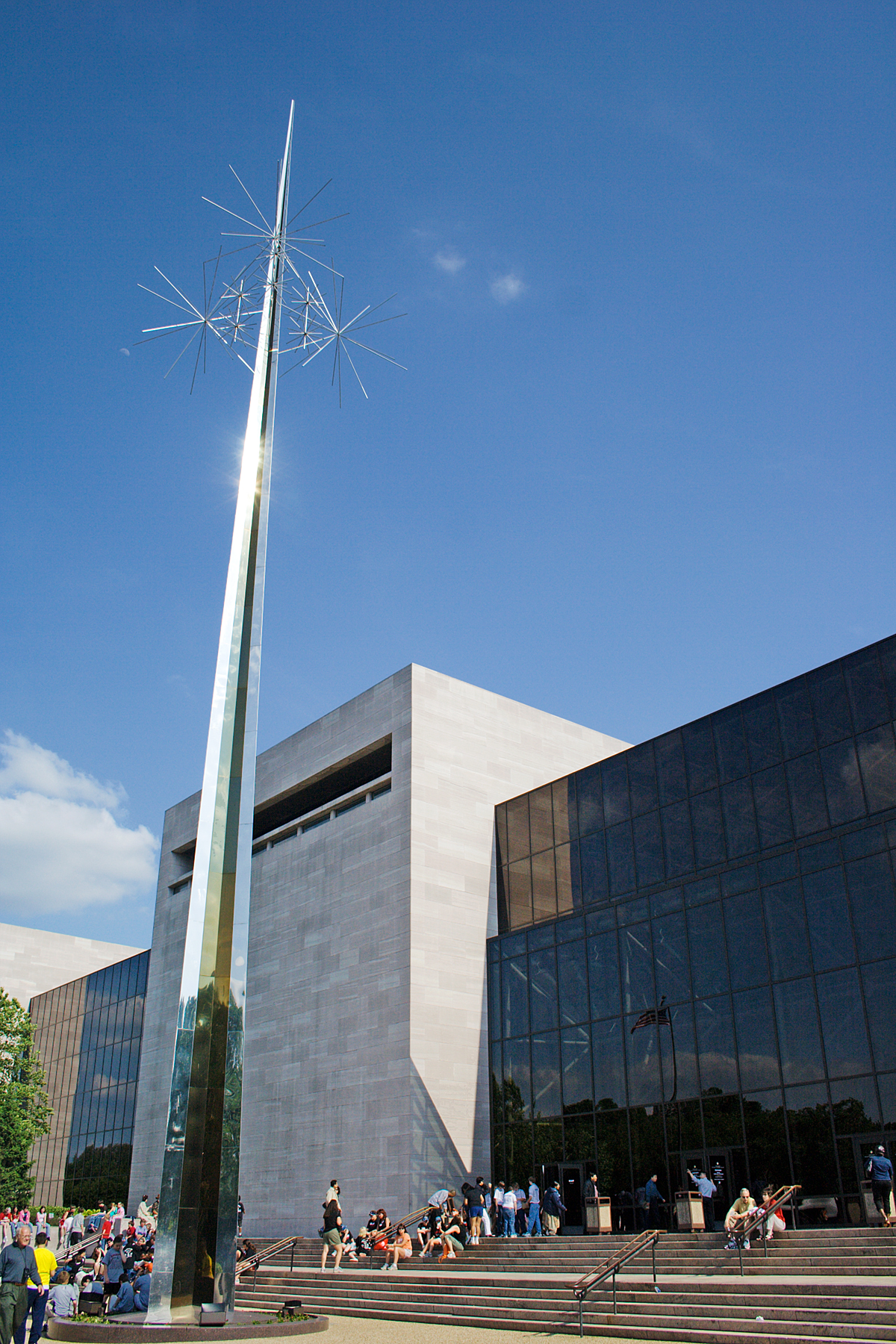
Smithsonian Air and Space Museum, Washington, D.C.

=== Alabama ===
- Battleship Memorial Park, Mobile
- Southern Museum of Flight, Birmingham
- Tuskegee Airmen National Historic Site, Tuskegee
- United States Space & Rocket Center, Huntsville
- United States Army Aviation Museum, Daleville

=== Alaska ===
- Alaska Aviation Museum, Anchorage
- Museum of Alaska Transportation & Industry, Wasilla
- Pioneer Air Museum, Fairbanks

=== Arkansas ===
- Arkansas Air & Military Museum, Fayetteville
- Aviation Cadet World, Eureka Springs
- Wings of Honor Museum, Walnut Ridge

=== Arizona ===
- CAF Airbase Arizona, Mesa
- Champlin Fighter Museum, Mesa – closed
- Lauridsen Aviation Museum, Buckeye
- Pima Air & Space Museum, Tucson
- Titan Missile Museum, Sahuarita
- Wingspan Air Heritage Foundation, Mesa

=== California ===
- Aerospace Museum of California, Sacramento
- Air Force Flight Test Museum, Edwards Air Force Base
- Alameda Naval Air Museum, Alameda
- Allen Airways Flying Museum, El Cajon
- Aviation Museum of Santa Paula, Santa Paula
- Blackbird Airpark, Palmdale
- Boron Aerospace Museum, Boron
- CAF Southern California Wing Museum, Camarillo
- California Science Center, Los Angeles
- Castle Air Museum, Atwater
- Chico Air Museum, Chico
- China Lake Museum, Ridgecrest
- Classic Rotors Museum, Ramona
- Dryden Flight Research Center Visitor Facility, Edwards Air Force Base near Palmdale
- Estrella Warbird Museum, Paso Robles
- Flight Path Learning Center & Museum, Los Angeles
- Flying Leatherneck Aviation Museum, Irvine
- Gillespie Field Annex, San Diego Air and Space Museum, El Cajon
- Golden Age Flight Museum, Tehachapi
- Hiller Aviation Museum, San Carlos
- Joe Davies Heritage Airpark, Palmdale
- Lyon Air Museum, Santa Ana
- March Field Air Museum, Riverside
- Milestones of Flight Museum, Lancaster – closed
- Minter Field Air Museum, Shafter
- Moffett Field Museum, Mountain View
- Museum of Flying, Santa Monica
- NASA Ames Exploration Center, Mountain View
- North Bay Air Museum, Sonoma
- Oakland Aviation Museum, Oakland
- Pacific Coast Air Museum, Santa Rosa
- Palm Springs Air Museum, Palm Springs
- Planes of Fame, Chino
- Point Mugu Missile Park, Navy Base Ventura County
- Ronald Reagan Presidential Library, Simi Valley
- Rowland Freedom Center, Vacaville
- San Diego Air & Space Museum, San Diego
- Santa Maria Museum of Flight, Santa Maria
- Space and Missile Heritage Center, Vandenberg Space Force Base
- Stockton Field Aviation Museum, Stockton
- Travis Air Force Base Aviation Museum, Fairfield
- USS Hornet Sea, Air & Space Museum, Alameda
- USS Midway Museum, San Diego
- Warbirds West Air Museum, El Cajon – closed
- Western Museum of Flight, Torrance
- Wings of History Museum, San Martin
- Yanks Air Museum, Chino
- Yanks Air Museum Annex, Greenfield

=== Colorado ===
- CAF Rocky Mountain Wing Museum, Grand Junction
- National Museum of World War II Aviation, Colorado Springs
- Peterson Air and Space Museum, Colorado Springs
- Pueblo Weisbrod Aircraft Museum, Pueblo
- Vintage Aero Flying Museum, Hudson
- Wings Over the Rockies Air and Space Museum, Denver

=== Connecticut ===
- Connecticut Air and Space Center, Stratford
- National Helicopter Museum, Stratford
- New England Air Museum, Windsor Locks
- Pratt & Whitney Hangar Museum, East Hartford

=== Delaware ===
- Air Mobility Command Museum, Dover
- Bellanca Airfield Museum, New Castle
- Delaware Aviation Museum, Georgetown

=== Florida ===
- Air Force Armament Museum, Valparaiso
- American Space Museum, Titusville
- Cape Canaveral Space Force Museum, Cape Canaveral Space Force Station
- DeLand Naval Air Station Museum, Deland
- EAA Chapter 1241 Air Museum, Marathon
- Fantasy of Flight, Polk City
- Florida Air Museum, Lakeland
- Flying Tigers Warbird Air Museum, Kissimmee
- Kennedy Space Center Visitor Complex, Merritt Island
- Kissimmee Air Museum, Kissimmee
- National Naval Aviation Museum, Pensacola
- Sands Space History Center, Cape Canaveral Space Force Station
- United States Astronaut Hall of Fame, Merritt Island
- Valiant Air Command Warbird Museum, Titusville
- Wings of Dreams Aviation Museum, Keystone Heights
- Wings Over Miami Air Museum, Miami

=== Georgia ===
- Army Aviation Heritage Foundation and Flying Museum, Hampton
- Aviation History & Technology Center, Marietta
- CAF Airbase Georgia, Peachtree City
- Candler Field Museum, Williamson – closed
- Delta Flight Museum, Atlanta
- Museum of Aviation, Warner Robins
- Museum of Flight, Dallas
- National Museum of Commercial Aviation, Forest Park – closed
- National Museum of the Mighty Eighth Air Force, Pooler
- World Aircraft Museum, Calhoun – closed
- World War II Flight Training Museum, Douglas

=== Hawaii ===
- Naval Air Museum Barbers Point, Kapolei – closed
- Pearl Harbor Aviation Museum, Honolulu

=== Idaho ===
- Bird Aviation Museum and Invention Center, Sagle
- Idaho Military History Museum, Boise
- Legacy Flight Museum, Rexburg
- Spirit of Flight Center, Nampa
- Warhawk Air Museum, Nampa

=== Illinois ===
- Air Classics Museum of Aviation, Sugar Grove
- Air Combat Museum, Springfield
- Frasca Air Museum, Urbana
- Greater St. Louis Air & Space Museum, Cahokia Heights – closed
- Heritage in Flight Museum, Lincoln
- Illinois Aviation Museum, Bolingbrook
- Museum of Science and Industry, Chicago
- Naval Air Station Glenview Museum, Glenview
- Octave Chanute Aerospace Museum, Rantoul – closed
- Poplar Grove Vintage Wings and Wheels Museum, Poplar Grove
- Prairie Aviation Museum, Bloomington
- Russell Military Museum, Zion
- Warbird Heritage Foundation, Waukegan
- World Aerospace Museum, Quincy – closed

=== Indiana ===
- Atterbury-Bakalar Air Museum, Columbus
- Freeman Army Airfield Museum, Seymour
- Grissom Air Museum, Peru
- Hoosier Air Museum, Auburn – closed
- Lawrence D. Bell Aircraft Museum, Mentone
- Indiana Aviation Museum, Valparaiso – closed
- Indiana Military Museum, Vincennes
- National Model Aviation Museum, Muncie
- National American Huey History Museum, Peru
- Northern Indiana Aviation Museum, Goshen, Indiana – closed
- Rolls-Royce Heritage Trust, Allison Branch, Indianapolis

=== Iowa ===
- Airpower Museum, Blakesburg
- Iowa Aviation Museum, Greenfield
- Iowa Aviation Heritage Museum, Ankeny
- Mid America Museum of Aviation & Transportation, Sioux City
- National Balloon Museum, Indianola, Iowa

=== Kansas ===
- Amelia Earhart Hangar Museum, Atchison
- American Flight Museum, Topeka
- B-29 Doc Hangar, Education and Visitors Center, Wichita
- Combat Air Museum, Topeka
- Cosmosphere, Hutchinson
- Emil W. Roesky, Jr., Memorial Aviation Heritage Museum, Coffeyville
- Kansas Aviation Museum, Wichita
- Mid-America Air Museum, Liberal

=== Kentucky ===
- Aviation Heritage Park, Bowling Green
- Aviation Museum of Kentucky, Lexington

=== Louisiana ===
- Barksdale Global Power Museum, Bossier City
- Chennault Aviation and Military Museum, Monroe
- National World War II Museum, New Orleans
- Southern Heritage Air Museum, Tallulah
- Wedell-Williams Aviation & Cypress Sawmill Museum, Patterson

=== Maine ===
- Brunswick Naval Aviation Museum, Brunswick
- Loring Air Museum, Limestone
- Maine Air Museum, Bangor
- Owls Head Transportation Museum, Owls Head

=== Maryland ===
- College Park Aviation Museum, College Park
- Glenn L. Martin Maryland Aviation Museum, Middle River
- Hagerstown Aviation Museum, Hagerstown
- Massey Air Museum, Massey
- Patuxent River Naval Air Museum, Lexington Park

=== Massachusetts ===
- Collings Foundation, Stow
- Massachusetts Air and Space Museum, Hyannis
- Shea Naval Aviation Museum, Weymouth
- Westfield Aviation Museum, Westfield

=== Michigan ===
- Air Zoo, Portage
- K. I. Sawyer Heritage Air Museum, Gwinn
- Michigan Flight Museum, Belleville
- Saginaw Valley Air Museum, Saginaw
- Selfridge Military Air Museum, Mount Clemens
- The Henry Ford, Dearborn
- Warbirds of Glory Museum, New Hudson
- Wurtsmith Air Museum, Oscoda

=== Minnesota ===
- American Wings Air Museum, Blaine – closed
- CAF Minnesota Wing Museum, Inver Grove Heights
- Fagen Fighters WWII Museum, Granite Falls
- Golden Wings Flying Museum, Blaine – closed
- Minnesota Air National Guard Museum, Minneapolis
- Northwest Airlines History Center Museum, Bloomington
- Polar Aviation Museum, Blaine – closed
- Wings of the North Air Museum, Eden Prairie

=== Mississippi ===
- Mississippi Aviation Heritage Museum, Gulfport
- National Agricultural Aviation Museum, Jackson

=== Missouri ===
- Airline History Museum, Kansas City
- Freedom of Flight Museum, Webb City
- Historic Aircraft Restoration Museum, St. Louis
- James S. McDonnell Prologue Room, St. Louis
- National Museum of Transportation, St. Louis
- Nicholas-Beazley Aviation Museum, Marshall
- TWA Museum, Kansas City, Missouri

=== Montana ===
- Malmstrom Museum, Great Falls
- Museum of Mountain Flying, Missoula
- Stonehenge Air Museum, Fortine

=== Nebraska ===
- Strategic Air Command & Aerospace Museum, Ashland

=== Nevada ===
- American Museum of Aviation/Museum of Hollywood Aviation, Las Vegas
- Cactus Air Force Wings and Wheels Museum, Carson City
- Thunderbirds Museum, Las Vegas

=== New Hampshire ===
- Aviation Museum of New Hampshire, Londonderry
- McAuliffe-Shepard Discovery Center, Concord

=== New Jersey ===
- Air Victory Museum, Lumberton
- Aviation Hall of Fame and Museum of New Jersey, Teterboro
- Millville Army Air Field Museum, Millville
- Naval Air Station Wildwood Aviation Museum, Cape May

=== New Mexico ===
- Anderson Abruzzo Albuquerque International Balloon Museum, Albuquerque
- New Mexico Museum of Space History, Alamogordo
- National Museum of Nuclear Science & History, Albuquerque
- Walker Aviation Museum, Roswell
- US Southwest Soaring Museum, Moriarty
- War Eagles Air Museum, Santa Teresa
- Western New Mexico Aviation Heritage Museum, Grants

=== New York ===
- American Airpower Museum, East Farmingdale
- Cradle of Aviation Museum, Garden City
- Empire State Aerosciences Museum, Glenville
- Glenn H. Curtiss Museum, Hammondsport
- Historic Aircraft Restoration Project, New York
- Intrepid Museum, New York
- Lucile M. Wright Air Museum, Jamestown
- National Soaring Museum, Elmira
- National Warplane Museum, Geneseo
- Niagara Aerospace Museum, Niagara Falls
- Old Rhinebeck Aerodrome, Rhinebeck
- Wings of Eagles Discovery Center, Elmira

=== North Carolina ===
- 82nd Airborne Division War Memorial Museum, Fayetteville
- Dare County Airport Museum, Manteo
- Havelock Tourist & Event Center, Havelock
- Hickory Aviation Museum, Hickory
- James Rogers McConnell Air Museum, Carthage
- Museum of Life and Science, Durham
- North Carolina Aviation Museum and Hall of Fame, Asheboro
- Sullenberger Aviation Museum, Charlotte
- Wright Brothers National Memorial, Kill Devil Hills
- US Army Airborne & Special Operations Museum, Fayetteville

=== North Dakota ===
- Fargo Air Museum, Fargo
- Dakota Territory Air Museum, Minot
- Ronald Reagan Minuteman Missile State Historic Site, Cooperstown

=== Ohio ===
- Armstrong Air and Space Museum, Wapakoneta
- Butler County Warbirds, Middletow
- Carillon Historical Park, Dayton
- Cincinnati Aviation Heritage Society & Museum, Cincinnati – closed
- Champaign Aviation Museum, Urbana
- Crawford Auto-Aviation Museum, Cleveland
- Dayton Aviation Heritage National Historical Park, Dayton
- Ernie Hall Aviation Museum, Warren
- Historical Aircraft Squadron, Lancaster
- Liberty Aviation Museum, Port Clinton
- MAPS Air Museum, Canton
- Motts Military Museum, Groveport
- NASA Glenn Research Center, Cleveland
- National Museum of the United States Air Force, Dayton
- National Aviation Hall of Fame, Dayton
- Ohio Air & Space Hall of Fame and Learning Center, Columbus – planned
- Ohio History of Flight Museum, Columbus – closed
- Tri-State Warbird Museum, Batavia
- WACO Air Museum, Troy

=== Oklahoma ===
- Ninety-Nines Museum of Women Pilots, Oklahoma City
- Oklahoma Museum of Flying, Bethany
- Science Museum Oklahoma, Oklahoma City
- Stafford Air & Space Museum, Weatherford
- The Caldwell Collection, El Reno
- Tulsa Air and Space Museum & Planetarium, Tulsa

=== Oregon ===
- Classic Aircraft Aviation Museum, Hillsboro
- Erickson Aircraft Collection, Madras
- North American Aerospace Museum, McMinnville
- Oregon Air and Space Museum, Eugene
- Tillamook Air Museum, Tillamook
- Western Antique Aeroplane & Automobile Museum, Hood River

=== Pennsylvania ===
- Air Heritage Aviation Museum, Beaver Falls
- Allied Air Force, Allentown – closed
- American Helicopter Museum & Education Center, West Chester
- Eagles Mere Air Museum, Eagles Mere
- Golden Age Air Museum, Bethel
- KLBE Air Museum, Latrobe
- Mid-Atlantic Air Museum, Reading
- Piper Aviation Museum, Lock Haven
- Wings of Freedom Aviation Museum, Horsham

=== Rhode Island ===
- Quonset Air Museum, North Kingstown – closed

=== South Carolina ===
- Florence Air & Missile Museum, Florence – closed
- Patriots Point, Charleston

=== South Dakota ===
- Minuteman Missile National Historic Site, Wall
- South Dakota Air and Space Museum, Box Elder

=== Tennessee ===
- Beechcraft Heritage Museum, Tullahoma
- Don F. Pratt Museum, Clarksville
- Swift Museum, Athens
- Tennessee Museum of Aviation, Sevierville

=== Texas ===
- 1940 Air Terminal Museum, Houston
- Aviation Museum of Texas, Uvalde
- Aviation Unmanned Vehicle Museum, Caddo Mills
- B-36 Peacemaker Museum, Fort Worth
- Cavanaugh Flight Museum, Addison – closed
- Cold War Air Museum, Lancaster
- Combat Jets Flying Museum, Houston – closed
- American Airlines C.R. Smith Museum, Fort Worth
- Flight of the Phoenix Aviation Museum, Gilmer
- Fort Worth Aviation Museum, Fort Worth
- Freedom Museum USA, Pampa
- Frontiers of Flight Museum, Dallas
- Hangar 25 Air Museum, Big Spring
- Historic Aviation Memorial Museum, Tyler
- Lone Star Flight Museum, Houston
- Mid America Flight Museum, Mount Pleasant
- Midland Army Air Field Museum, Midland
- Museum of Aerospace Medicine, San Antonio – closed
- National Aviation Education Center, Dallas
- National WASP WWII Museum, Sweetwater
- No. 1 British Flying Training School Museum, Terrell
- Pate Museum of Transportation, Cresson – closed
- Perrin Air Force Base Historical Museum, Denison
- Pioneer Flight Museum, Kingsbury
- Silent Wings Museum, Lubbock
- Space Center Houston, Houston
- Texas Air Museum, Slaton
- Texas Air Museum - Stinson Chapter, San Antonio
- Texas Air & Space Museum, Amarillo
- Texas Flying Legends Museum, Houston – closed
- Texas Military Forces Museum, Austin
- USAF Airman Heritage Museum, San Antonio
- USS Lexington Museum on the Bay, Corpus Christi
- Vietnam War Flight Museum, Houston
- Vintage Flying Museum, Fort Worth

=== Utah ===
- Commemorative Air Force Utah Wing Museum, Heber City
- Hill Aerospace Museum, Ogden
- Historic Wendover Airfield, Wendover
- Vintage Aviation Museum, Spanish Fork – planned
- Western Sky Aviation Warbird Museum, St. George

=== Vermont ===
- Experimental Balloon and Airship Museum, Thetford

=== Virginia ===
- Air Power Park, Hampton
- Aviation Historical Park, Virginia Beach
- Military Aviation Museum, Virginia Beach
- Steven F. Udvar-Hazy Center, National Air and Space Museum, Chantilly
- Science Museum of Virginia, Richmond
- Shannon Air Museum, Fredericksburg
- Virginia Air and Space Center, Hampton
- Virginia Aviation Museum, Richmond – closed
- Virginia Museum of Transportation, Roanoke
- Wallops Flight Facility Visitor Center, Wallops Island

=== Washington ===
- Flying Heritage & Combat Armor Museum, Everett
- Future of Flight Aviation Center & Boeing Tour, Mukilteo
- Gig Harbor Vintage Aero Museum, Gig Harbor
- Heritage Flight Museum, Burlington
- Historic Flight Foundation, Spokane
- McAllister Museum of Aviation, Yakima
- Museum of Flight, Seattle
- North Cascades Vintage Aircraft Museum, Concrete – closed
- Olympic Flight Museum, Olympia
- Pacific Northwest Naval Air Museum, Oak Harbor
- Pasco Aviation Museum, Pasco
- Pearson Air Museum, Vancouver
- Port Townsend Aero Museum, Port Townsend

=== Washington, D.C. ===
- National Air and Space Museum, Washington, D.C.

=== Wisconsin ===
- Aviation Heritage Center of Wisconsin, Sheboygan Falls
- EAA Aviation Museum, Oshkosh
- Great Lakes Air Museum, Waukesha – planned
- Kelch Aviation Museum, Brodhead

=== Wyoming ===
- Callair Museum, Afton
- Good Aviation Veterans Museum, Casper
- Museum of Flight and Aerial Firefighting, Greybull

== Uruguay ==
- Colonel Jaime Meregalli Aeronautical Museum

== Venezuela ==
- Aeronautics Museum of Maracay

== Vietnam ==
- B-52 Victory Museum, Hanoi
- Museum of Air Force and Air Defense Force, Hanoi
- Vietnam Military History Museum, Hanoi
- Vietnam People's Air Force Museum, Hanoi
- Vietnam People's Air Force Museum, Ho Chi Minh City
- War Remnants Museum, Ho Chi Minh City

== Zimbabwe ==
- Gweru Military Museum, Gweru

== See also ==
- List of airport museums in the United States
- List of transport museums
- List of United States Air Force museums
- Airports for antique aircraft
