= War Museum Cambodia =

Museum in Siem Reap, Cambodia

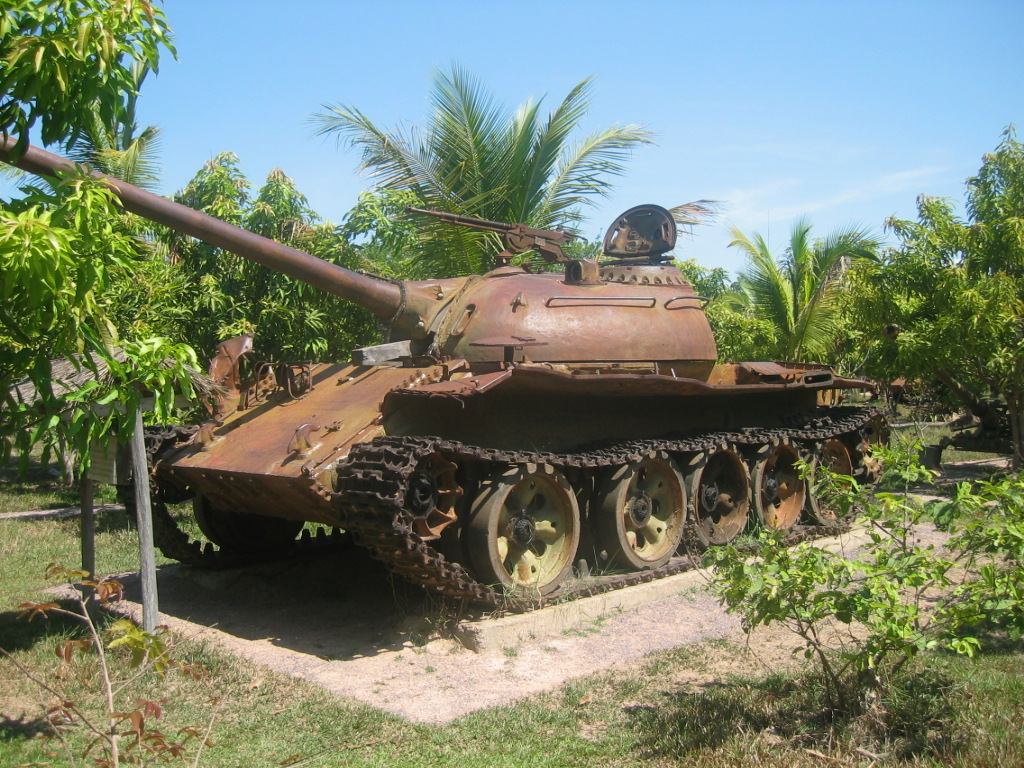
A partially-ruined T-54 main battle tank exhibited at the War Museum, Siem Reap

The War Museum Cambodia is located at Siem Reap in Cambodia, near National Highway No. 6 between the city of Siem Reap and the International Airport. The purpose of this museum is to keep the memory of the civil war in the history of Cambodia alive and to preserve the unique collection for posterity.

== History ==
2001 – Start

In February 2001 the Siem Reap War Museum was built on more than 2 hectares of land, just off National Road 6 between the airport and the city center of Siem Reap.

2008 – Visits drop off

For 12 years the Siem Reap War Museum was neglected and deteriorating rapidly. The museum was facing a battle to stay open in the face of mass desertion by tourists: visitor numbers had dwindled to about 20 a day.

2013 – New beginning

In 2013 a new general manager (Mr R.S. Esselaar) was appointed and the name of the museum was changed from Siem Reap War Museum into War Museum Cambodia. Although the museum was badly damaged by a powerful small tornado on 18 May 2015, over the years many improvements were made and new visitor records were achieved.

2016 – Rebuilding

In 2016 the rebuilding of the whole museum had started, beginning with the new Landmine House in the back of the museum which was finally opened in 2018.

== Collection ==
The War Museum Cambodia has a unique collection of weaponry, mostly located outside below a mango tree plantation. The collection was gathered since 1999 from areas where fighting took place; like Anlong Veng, Siem Reap and Odor Meanchey. It is a mix of Chinese, U.S. and Soviet hardware, but mostly Russian tanks and assault weapons. Some of these weapons have even seen action during World War II.

The museums collection was partly equipment which was sold for scrap metal prices. For a scrap-metal tank $300 to $400 would be paid. Competition from scrap dealers was not the only problem the museum faced as it gathered its collection: most of the machinery was very heavy and it was difficult to gain access to dense jungle areas to remove tanks, guns and personnel carriers.

Over the years the collection was supplemented by Western private individuals like military collector Geoffrey Oldham, furthermore some artifacts were given to the museum by the General Manager (Mr R.S. Esselaar) who found some of these artifacts during visits to several remote villages.

To preserve the unique collection for posterity Project Preservation was launched in 2015. Certain artifacts were brought back in the original state, other artifacts were restored.

There is a vast array of vehicles, artillery and other equipment on display. You can see Russian tanks (T-54 and T-55), a MiG-19 jet fighter aircraft, a large Mil Mi-8 helicopter, a 85-mm field artillery gun and a D-44 divisional gun. Many of the vehicles have battle damage. There are also many assault rifles, like the ubiquitous AK-47, landmines, claymore anti personnel mines, etc. There is a broad range of uniforms, flags as well as rare photographs from the war period on display.

=== List of items on display ===
==== Aircraft ====
- Shenyang F-6
- Mil Mi-8

==== Tanks ====
- T-54
- T-55

== See also ==
- List of aerospace museums
