= Flight of the Phoenix Aviation Museum =

- Location within Texas
- Established: 1994
- Location: Gilmer, Texas
- Coordinates: 32.7003°N 94.9470°W
- Type: Aviation museum
- Founder: Steve Dean
- Website: www.flightofthephoenix.org

The Flight of the Phoenix Aviation Museum is an aviation museum located at Gilmer Municipal Airport in Gilmer, Texas.

== History ==
The museum was founded by Steve Dean, the owner of Dean Lumber Company, in 1994. The 6,000 sq ft (560 m^{2}) museum hangar was originally built mainly to house the company's aircraft and provide an example of how its products could be used.

A T-37 was added to the museum in 2010. The following year, it planned to purchase an F-100F. In 2013, a L-26C that was used as an Air Force One was flown to the museum.

== Exhibits ==
Exhibits at the museum include a Link Trainer.

== Collection ==
- Aero Commander L-26C
- Beechcraft D18S
- Cessna T-37B Tweet
- de Havilland DH.82 Tiger Moth
- Great Lakes Sport Trainer
- North American T-6G Texan
- Piper PA-12 Super Cruiser
- Stearman PT-17

== Events ==
The museum holds an annual Veterans Day airshow.

== Programs ==
The museum offers rides in three of its aircraft.

== See also ==
- List of aviation museums
