= Minter Field Air Museum =

- Location within California
- Location: Shafter, California
- Coordinates: 35.5031°N 119.1823°W
- Type: Aviation museum
- Website: www.minterfieldairmuseum.com

The Minter Field Air Museum is an aviation museum located at the Shafter Airport in Shafter, California focused on the history of Minter Field Army Airfield.

== History ==
The museum acquired a B-25 in 1977. It opened five years later.

The museum attempted to save the Blue Moon auditorium in 2007. In December of that year, it broke ground on a new hangar.

The museum building received a new roof in March 2021 and was repainted in October 2023.

== Exhibits ==
Exhibits at the museum include original copies of the Japanese surrender documents.

== Collection ==
=== Aircraft ===
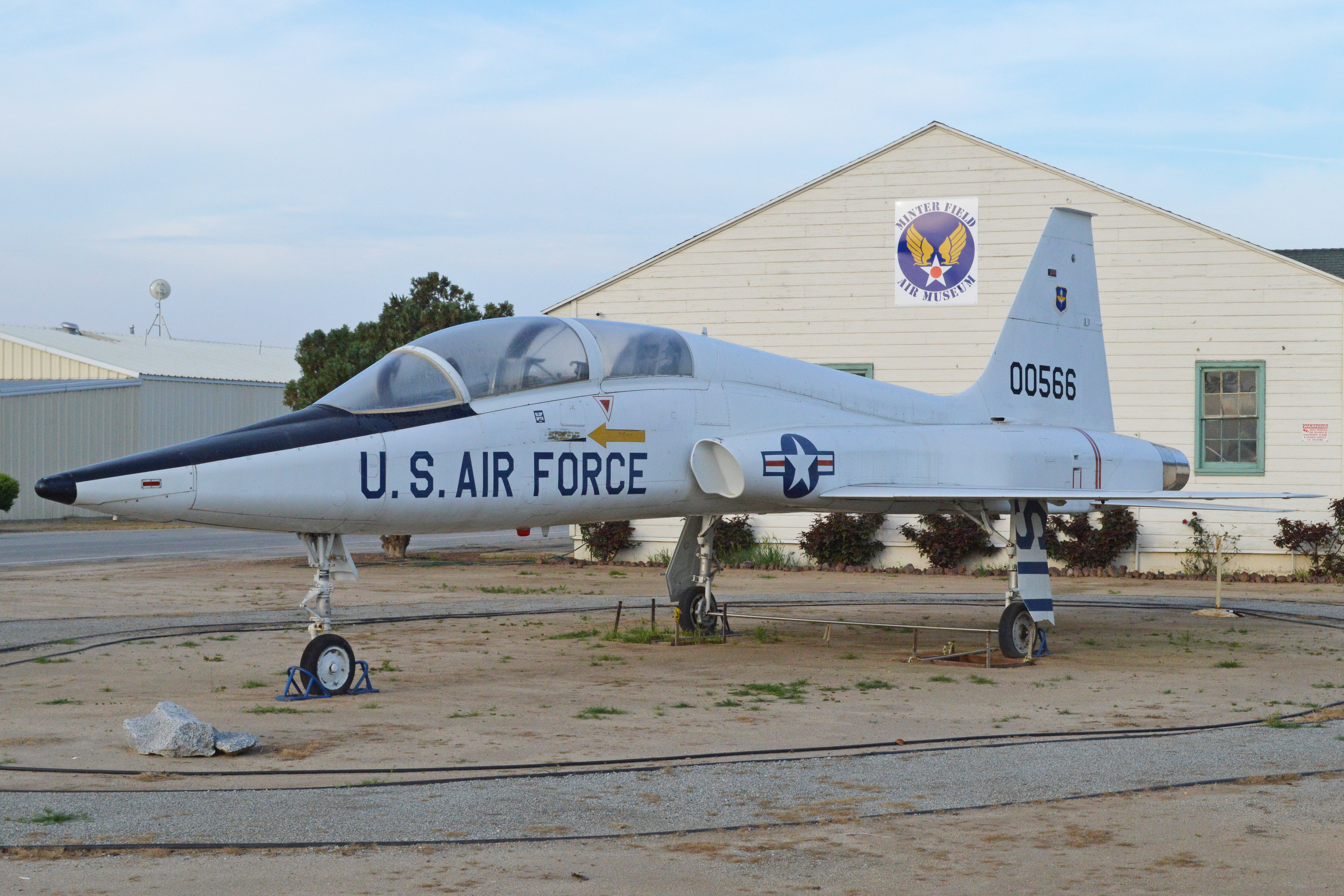
Northrop T-38A Talon

- Aeronca L-3B Grasshopper
- Bell AH-1 Cobra
- Fokker Dr.I – replica
- Hughes OH-6 Cayuse
- Lockheed TV-2
- Northrop T-38A Talon
- Vultee BT-13 Valiant

=== Ground vehicles ===
- 1940 Plymouth staff car
- 1941 Harley Davidson motorcycle
- General Motors firetruck
- Searchlight
- Willys MB

== Events ==
The museum holds an annual Wings and Wheels event. It previously held an annual Warbirds in Action Air Show.

== See also ==
- List of aviation museums
