= Shea Naval Aviation Museum =

- Location within Massachusetts
- Location: Weymouth, Massachusetts
- Coordinates: 42.1588°N 70.9413°W
- Type: Aviation museum
- Website: www.anapatriotsquadron.com/shea-memorial-grove.htm

The Shea Naval Aviation Museum is an aviation museum located in Weymouth, Massachusetts focused on the history of Naval Air Station South Weymouth and Naval Air Station Squantum.

== History ==
After Naval Air Station South Weymouth closed in 1997, the Patriot Squadron of the Association of Naval Aviation created a committee to establish a military heritage museum at the Union Point real estate development on the site of the old base. That year the Navy dedicated the Shea Memorial Grove, named after Lieutenant Commander John J. Shea, consisting of a park with a Douglas A-4B Skyhawk mounted on a pedestal, and appointed the ANA Patriot Squadron to watch over it after the Navy abandoned the base. ANA Patriot Squadron members cosmetically restored the aircraft in 2011 and in 2025.

In October 2011, after previously requiring appointments scheduled in advance, the ANA Patriot Squadron opened the Shea Naval Aviation Museum to the general public once a month in the former base gymnasium, the Shea Fitness Center. The museum installed 100 memorial bricks in the grove in October 2013. In 2015, the museum was given a documentary about the history of the base by the organization redeveloping the former base at that time. However, in June 2017 the ANA Patriot Squadron was forced to close the museum and vacate the building so that it could be renovated.

In June 2025 the ANA Patriot Squadron reopened the Shea Naval Aviation Museum at a new location, in the former base hobby shop office building at 194 Memorial Grove Avenue. The museum is presently open from 9 AM to noon on the second Saturday of the month, from 9 AM to 11 AM on the last Saturday of the month, and on other occasions by appointment. Admission is free and all are welcome.

== Exhibits ==
Exhibits at the museum include a sensor operator’s station from a P-3, an instrument panel from an A-4, Navy and Marine Corps uniforms, squadron insignia patches, historic photographs, model aircraft, plaques and signs, and many other artifacts associated with both bases.

== Collection ==
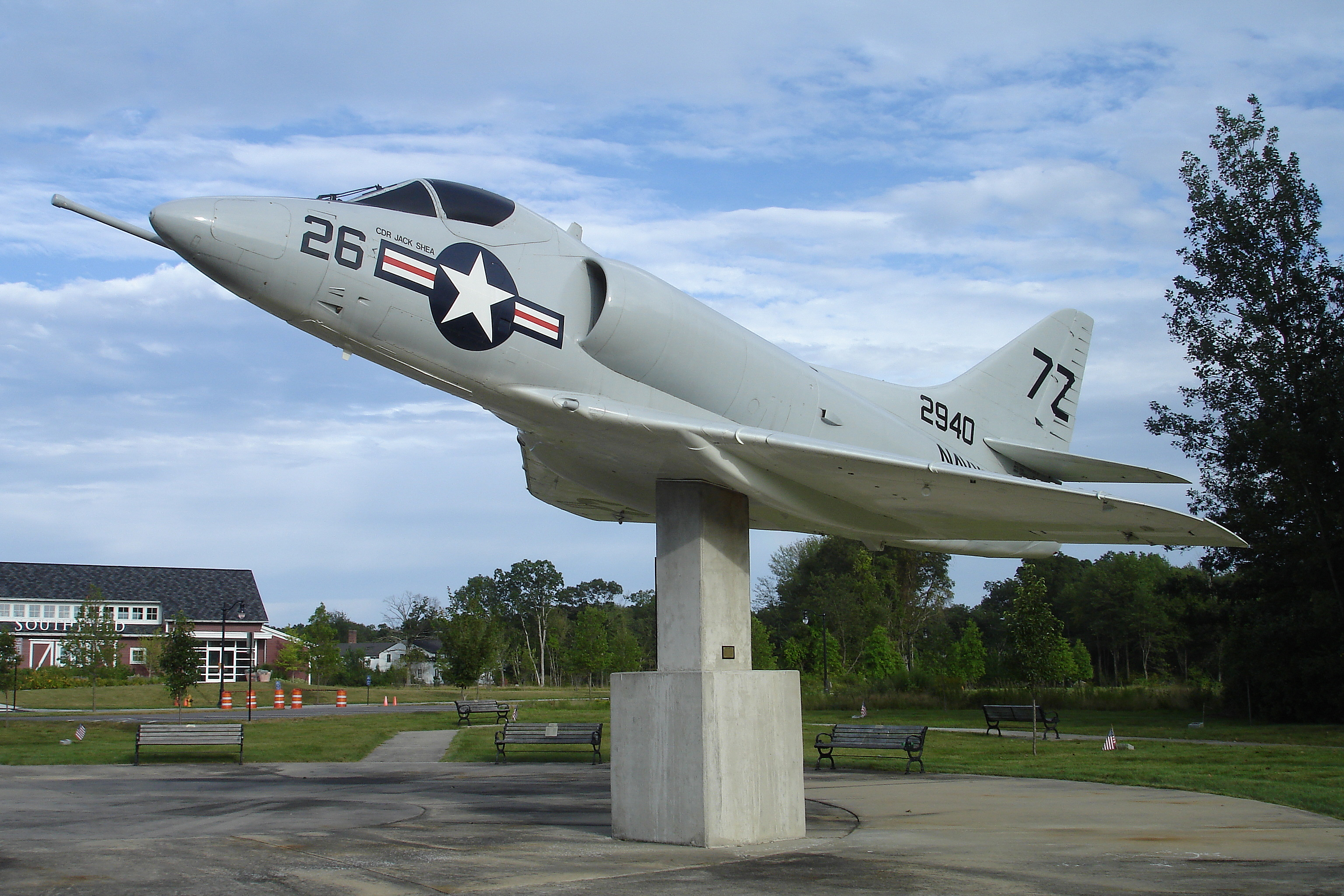
Douglas A-4B Skyhawk

- Douglas A-4B Skyhawk
- Grumman C-1A Trader – cockpit only

== See also ==
- List of aviation museums
