= Museo del Concorde =

Former aerospace museum in Ciudad Juárez, Mexico

- Museo del Concorde
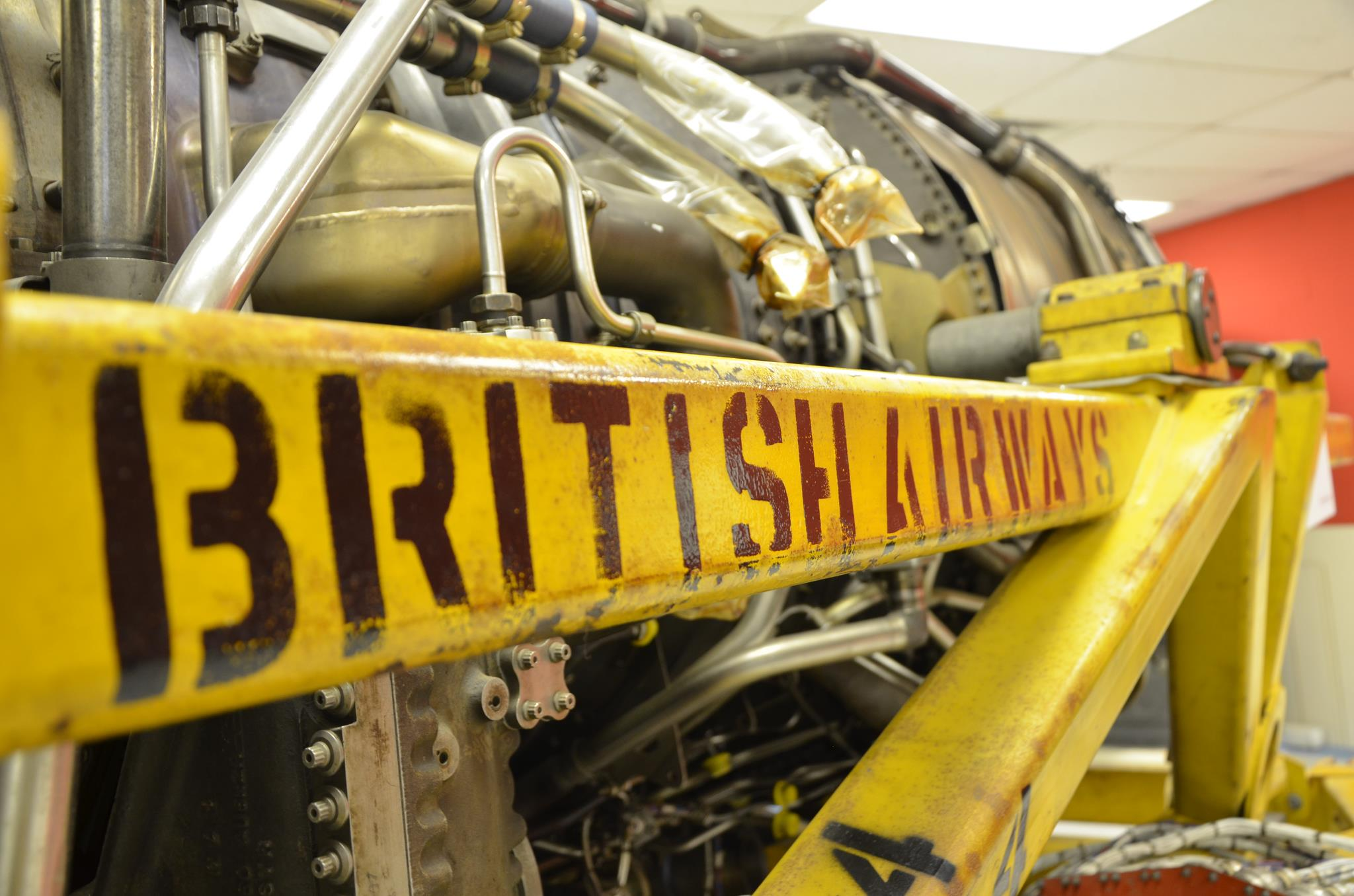
- Rolls-Royce/Snecma Olympus 593 engine
- Location: Ciudad Juárez
- Type: Aerospace
- Key holdings: Concorde
- Website: www.museodelconcorde.com,

The Museo del Concorde is a museum located in Ciudad Juárez, Chihuahua, Mexico dedicated to display parts of the Franco-British supersonic airliner Concorde, which was retired in 2003.

== History ==
In 2004, many original components used for maintenance and operation of the Concorde were acquired through the Dovebid agency and transported by ABELS.

The aircraft components housed at El Museo del Concorde weigh more than 10 tonnes. They were brought from Birmingham, England, to Houston, Texas, by water, which took 30 days. They were then brought to Ciudad Juárez in three trucks.

== Objectives ==
The museum's objectives are to provide information on the Concorde, and also to preserve its memory not just as a simple aircraft, but as a complex piece of engineering.

== Exhibition ==
The museum houses over 200 pieces, including a Rolls-Royce/Snecma Olympus 593 engine, a Snecma twin intake, control columns, seats and the left landing gear.

== See also ==
- List of aerospace museums
