= Rowland Freedom Center =

- The lobby of the Rowland Freedom Center

- Location within California
- Established: June 1998
- Location: Vacaville, California
- Coordinates: 38°22′40″N 121°57′42″W
- Type: Military museum
- Founder: Herm Rowland
- Website: rowlandfreedomcenter.org

The Rowland Freedom Center is an aviation and military museum located at the Nut Tree Airport in Vacaville, California.

== History ==
The museum was previously known as the Jimmy Doolittle Air & Space Museum and the Center for Freedom and Flight before its current name was adopted in 2020.

== Exhibits ==
Exhibits at the museum include flight simulators, a Pearl Harbor Display, including - courtesy of the US Navy - an actual artifact from the USS Arizona which you can touch. There are also displays about early aviation, California pioneers, air racing, women in aviation, the mechanics of flight.

== Collection ==
=== Aircraft ===
- Bell UH1 Huey
- Gonzales No. 1 Tractor Biplane
- Nakajima B5N2
- Naval Aircraft Factory N3N 'Yellow Peril'
- Ryan STA
- North American P-51D Mustang

=== Ground vehicles ===
- Autocar M2A1 Half-Track
- 1945 Willy's Jeep

=== Simulators ===
- Microsoft Flight Simulator
- KC-10A Flight Training Device (FTD)

== Events ==
The museum hosts numerous special events throughout the year, including 12 Planes of Christmas (early December), Planes Trains and Automobiles (September) and a regular veteran-focused "Cup Of Joe" meeting the first Saturday of each month.

== See also ==
- List of aerospace museums
