= Aviation Historical Park =

Aviation museum in Virginia Beach, Virginia

Coordinates: 36°48′27.3″N 76°1′13.8″W

Aviation Historical Park is an outdoor aviation museum just inside the main gate of Naval Air Station Oceana in Virginia Beach, Virginia. It is open for visitors on a tour of the base, which is open to military and DOD employees. Aircraft on display represent those historically in use at the air station.

Aircraft in the collection include:

- Douglas XAD-1 (Skyraider)
- Douglas A-4F (Skyhawk)
- Grumman KA-6D (Intruder)
- Douglas F4D-1 (Skyray)
- Grumman F11F-1 (Tiger)
- Grumman F9F-2 (Panther)
- McDonnell F2H-4 (Banshee)
- North American FJ-3 (Fury)
- Grumman F-14A (Tomcat)
- McDonnell-Douglas F-4B (Phantom II)
- McDonnell-Douglas FA-18A (Hornet)
- Vought F-8E (Crusader)

== See also ==
- List of aerospace museums
