= Emil W. Roesky, Jr., Memorial Aviation Heritage Museum =

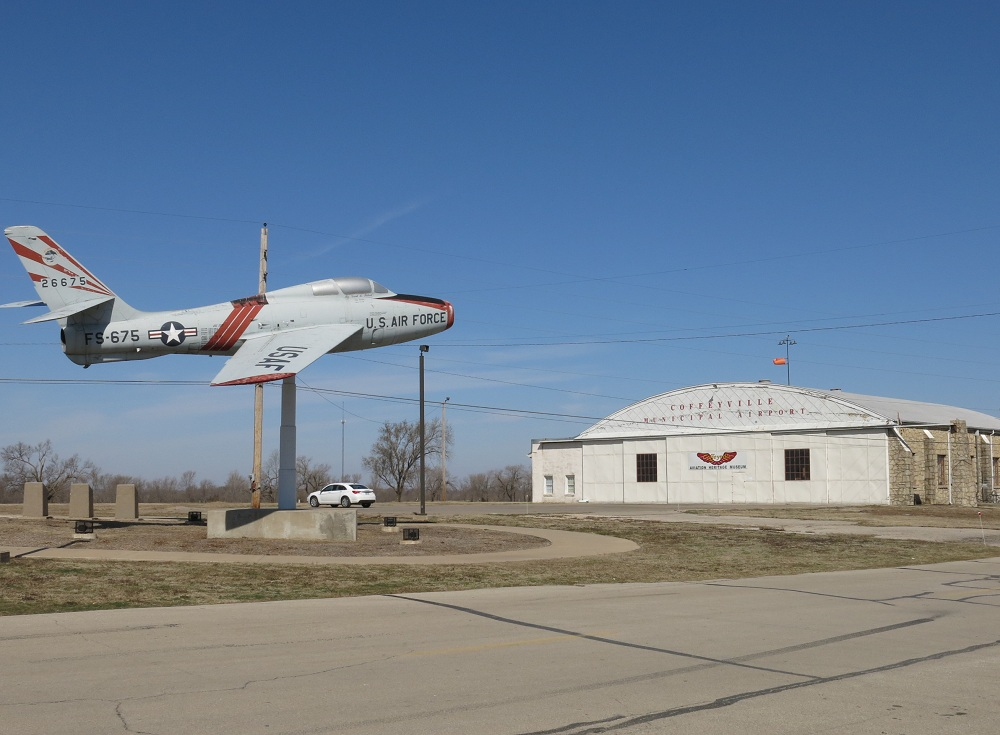
- F-84F and the museum hangar

- Location within Kansas
- Former name: Coffeyville Aviation Heritage Museum
- Established: 1992
- Location: Coffeyville, Kansas
- Coordinates: 37.0655°N 95.6402°W
- Type: Aviation museum
- Website: www.coffeyville.com/314/Aviation-Heritage-Museum

The Emil W. Roesky, Jr., Memorial Aviation Heritage Museum is an aviation museum located in Coffeyville, Kansas.

== History ==
The museum is named for Emil W. Roesky, Jr., the manager and long time tour guide. It celebrated its 30th anniversary in 2022.

== Facilities ==
The museum is located in a 1933-built hangar at Pfister Park, the location of the former Big Hill Airport.

== Exhibits ==
Exhibits include a display about the Funk Aircraft Company, including the first Funk engine, and memorabilia from Coffeyville Army Air Field.

== Collection ==
- Brock KB-2
- Funk B
- Funk B-75-L
- Funk B-85-C
- Mitchell U-2 Superwing
- Republic F-84F Thunderstreak
