= Civil Aviation Museum (Armenia) =

Armenian museum

Coordinates: 40.152458°N 44.398169°E

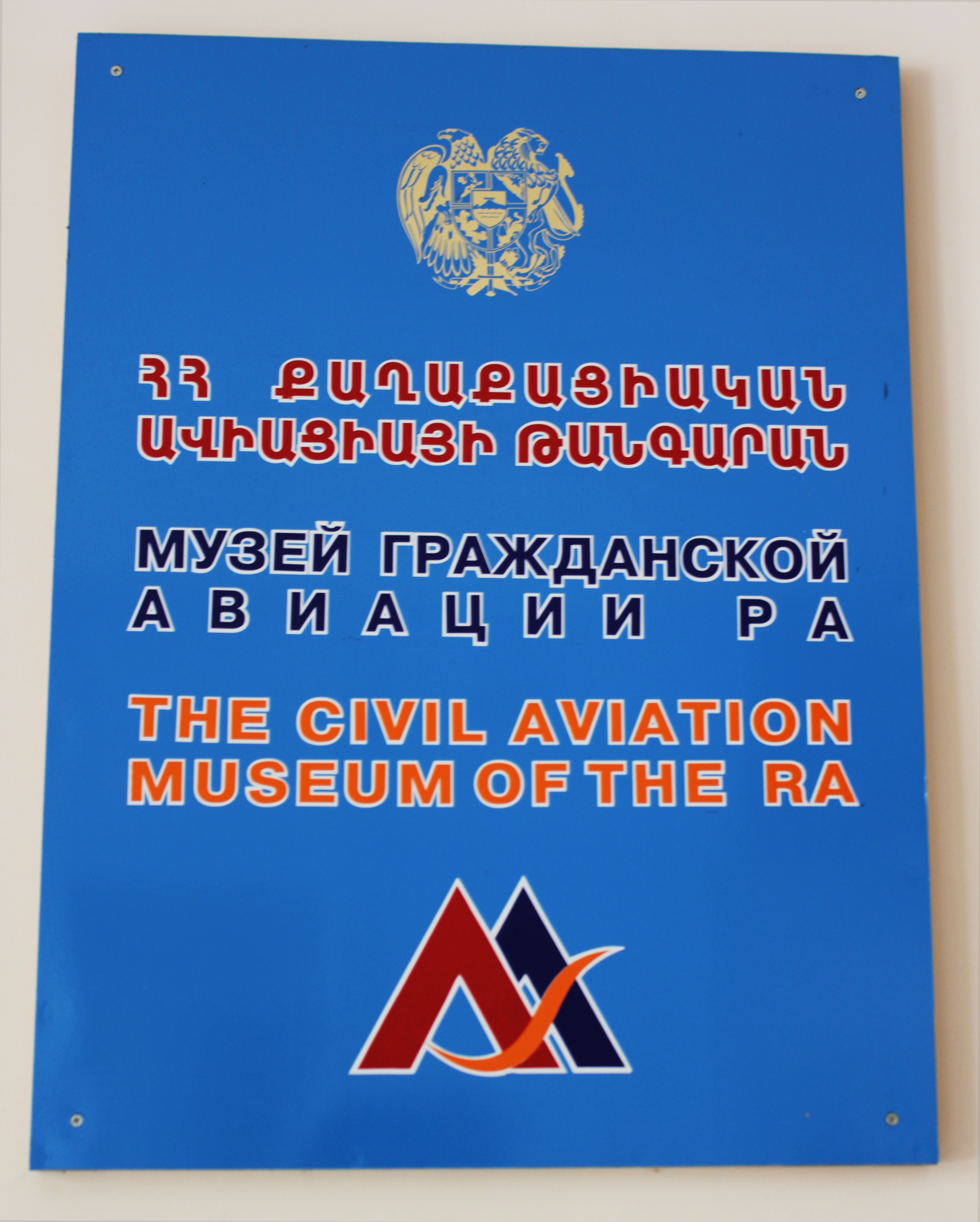
The signboard of the Civil Aviation Museum of Armenia

The Civil Aviation Museum of Armenia (Armenian: Հայկական ավիացիայի պատմության թանգարան) was founded in 1998, on the 65th anniversary of civil aviation in Armenia. Located in Zvartnots, Armenia, the museum contains documents, collections, photographs, books and other valuable items that reflect the history of civil aviation.

== History ==
The History Museum of Aviation was founded in 1998 under the initiative of former pilot, first-class master of sports Razmik Gasparyan. The background begins with the creation of Civil Aviation on 30 September 1933, when executed on a first-Tbilisi-Yerevan flights. Gharibjanyan was the first director. In 1999, the museum was included in the information-based aviation museums in the catalog published in France.

== Exhibition ==
The museum presents the history of aviation from 1902 onwards. Presents the first flight of the pilots who were serving in the French, American, Russian and other air forces of Armenia and the Republic of Armenia, Armenia's famous pilots. The museum has a unique collection of photos represented by a number of small pieces of aircraft, the air forces of different dresses, famous pilots, the aviation-related literature. Created as part of the Great Patriotic War, the pilots, the participants of the Artsakh Liberation War, in 1988, stands on the Yugoslavian plane crashed near Echmiadzin. The civil aviation authorities are represented in the respective stands. The museum also displays pilots' uniforms. There is also a museum of Armenian scientists who have contributed to the development of cosmicism and aviation.

== Address ==
The museum is located in the building of the General Administration of Civil Aviation at Zvartnots International Airport.

== Gallery ==
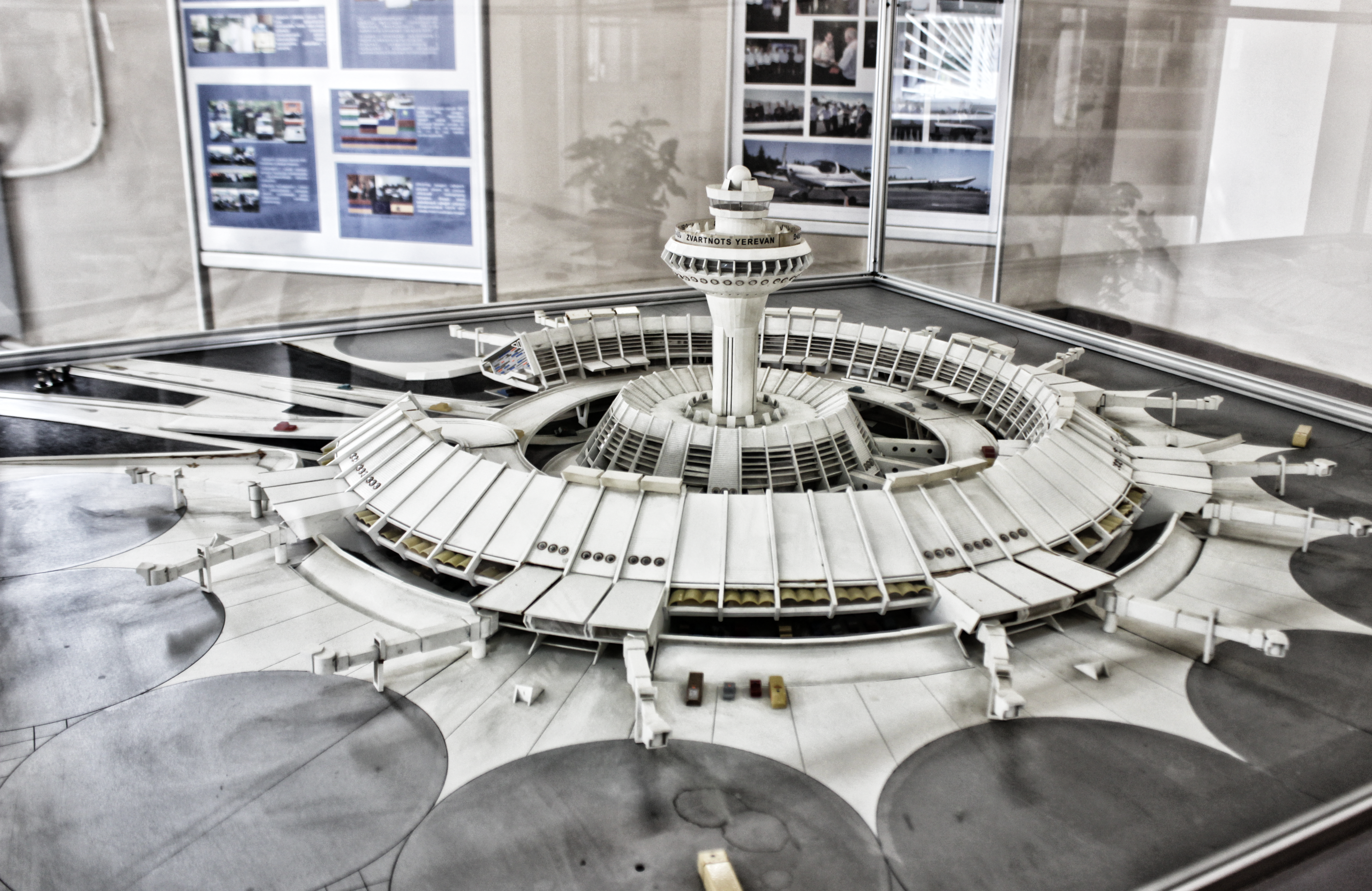
Old airport building model

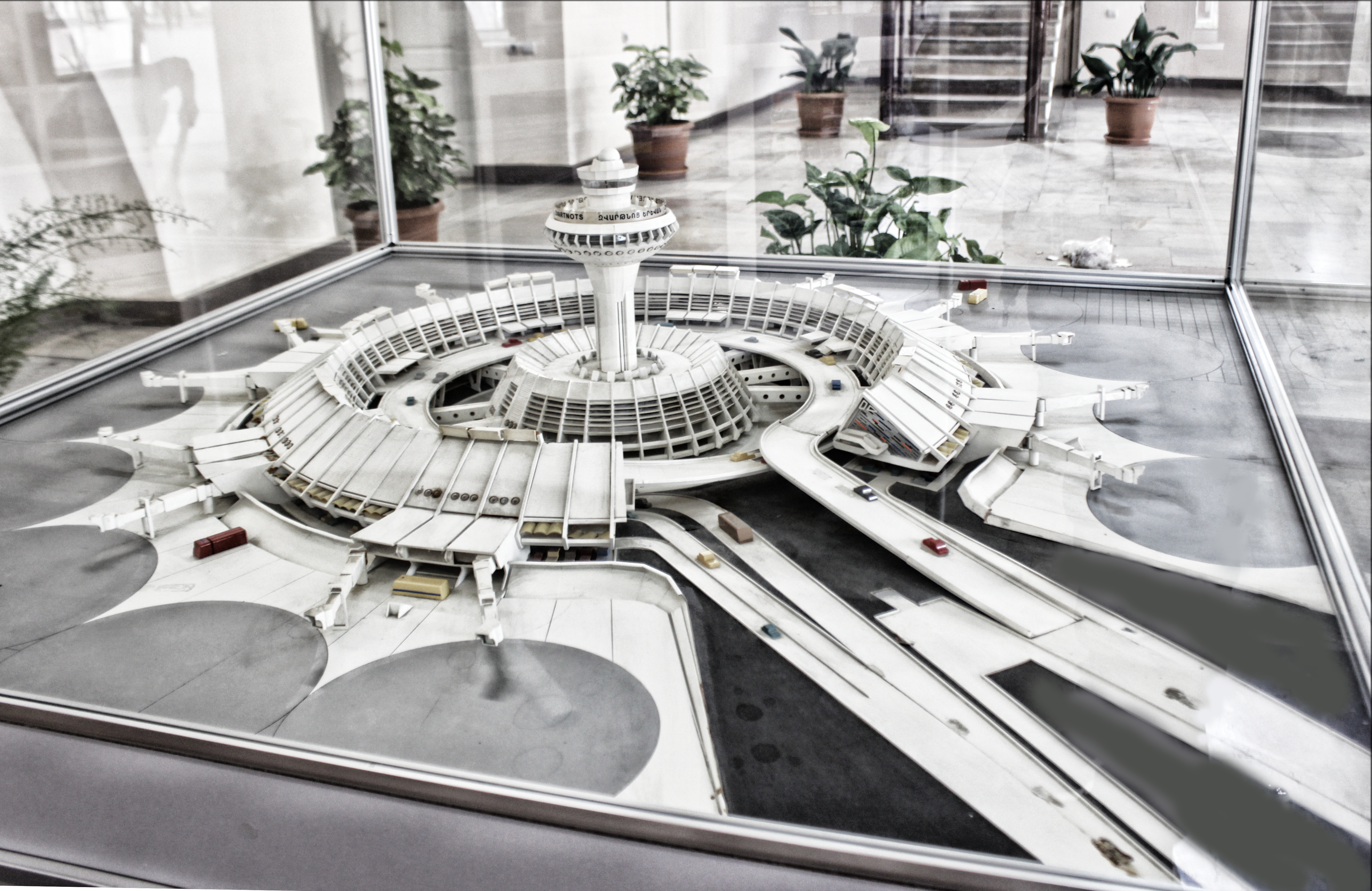
Old airport building model

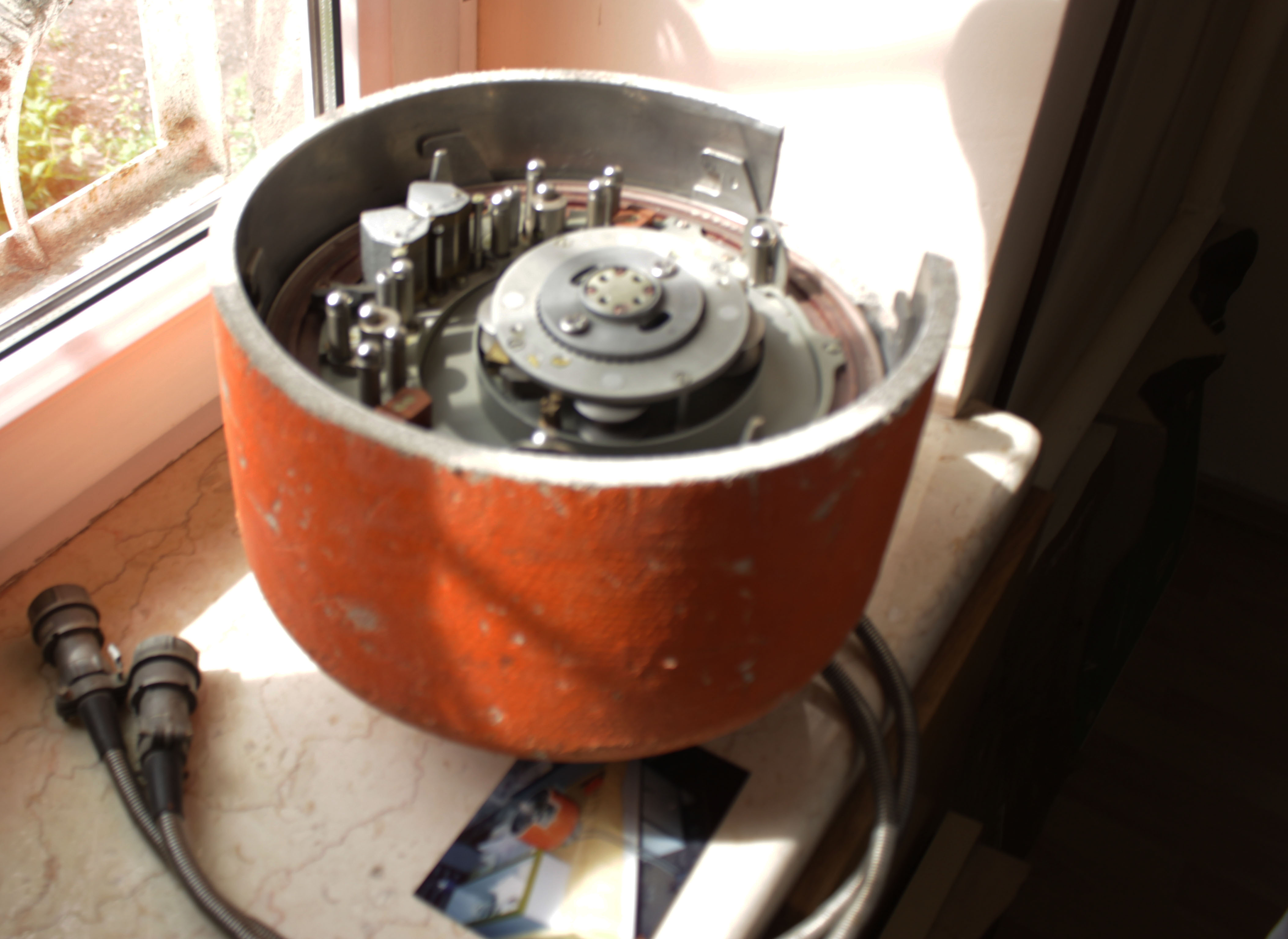
The museum's exhibits, a recording device - "Black Box"

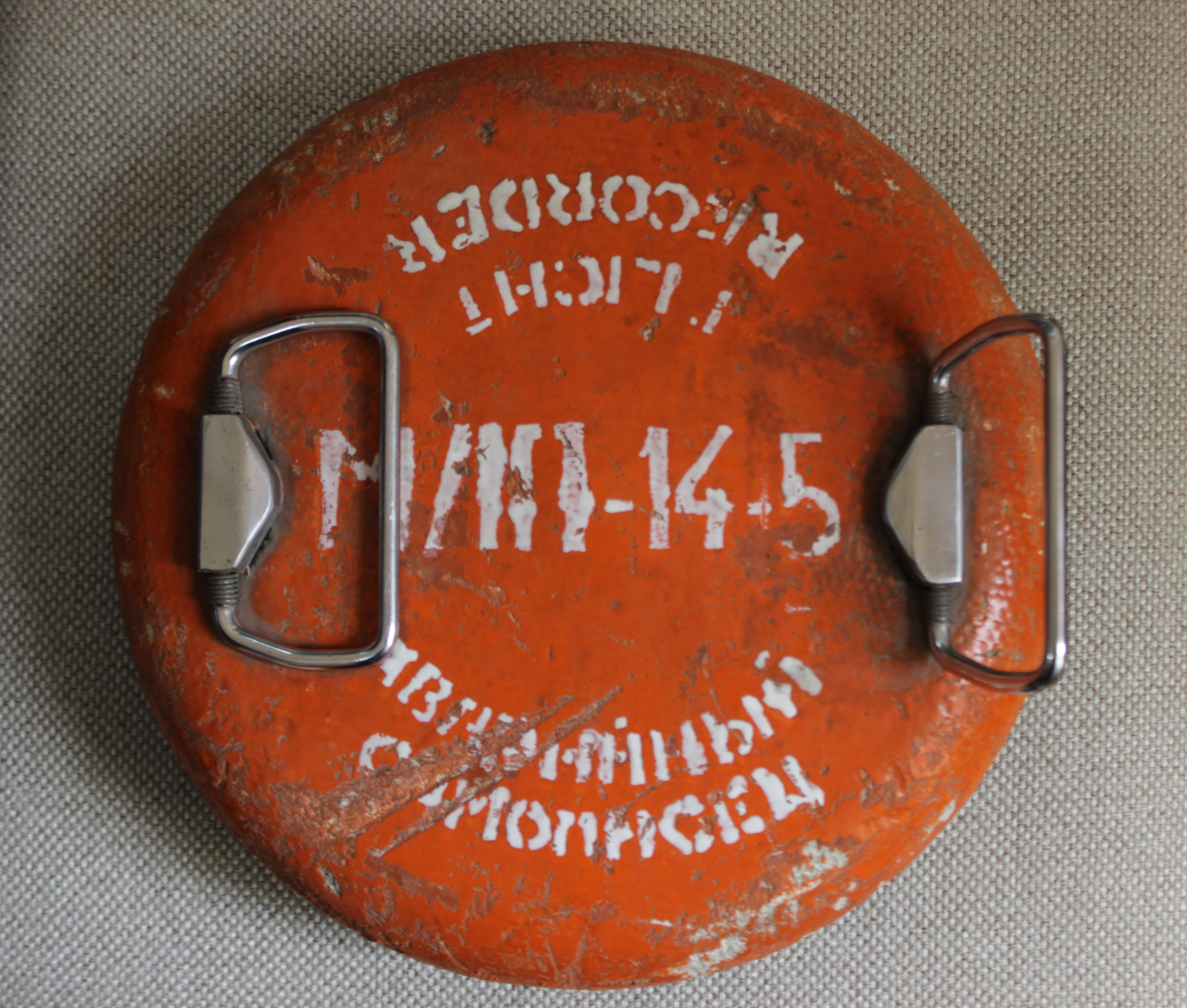
The museum's exhibits, a recording device - "Black Box"

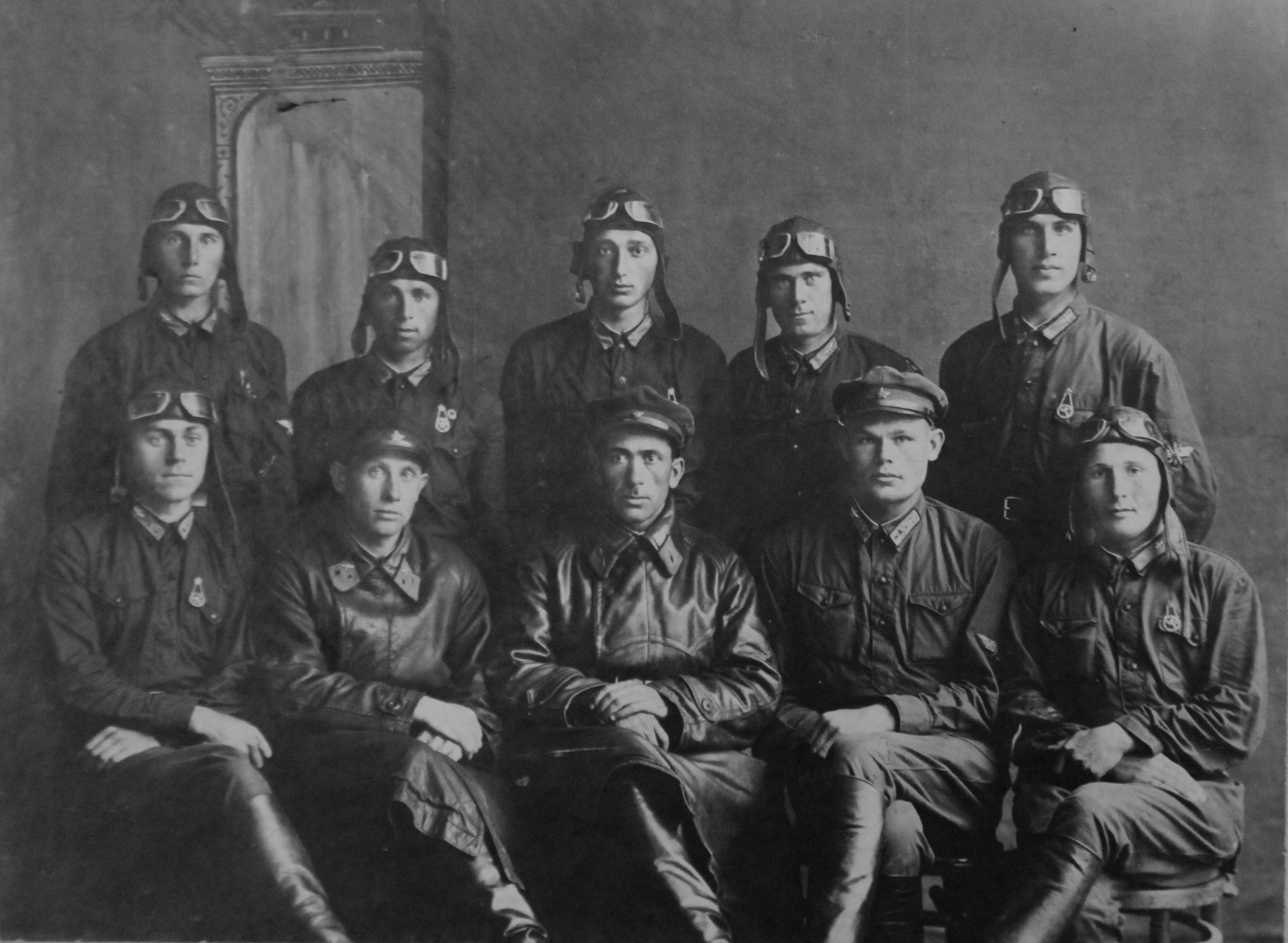
Armenian aviators group photos (museum)
