= Cold War Air Museum =

- Location within Texas
- Location: Lancaster, Texas
- Coordinates: 32.5797°N 96.7237°W
- Type: Aviation museum
- Director: Pete Coz
- President: Bruce Stringfellow
- Website: web.archive.org/web/20081203123453/http://www.coldwarairmuseum.org

The Cold War Air Museum was an aviation museum located at the Lancaster Regional Airport in Lancaster, Texas focused on the Cold War and Eastern Bloc aircraft.

== History ==
The museum lost a trademark lawsuit against the Cold War Museum in 2009.

== Facility ==
The museum was located in a 45,000 sq ft (4,200 m^{2}) hangar.

== Collection ==
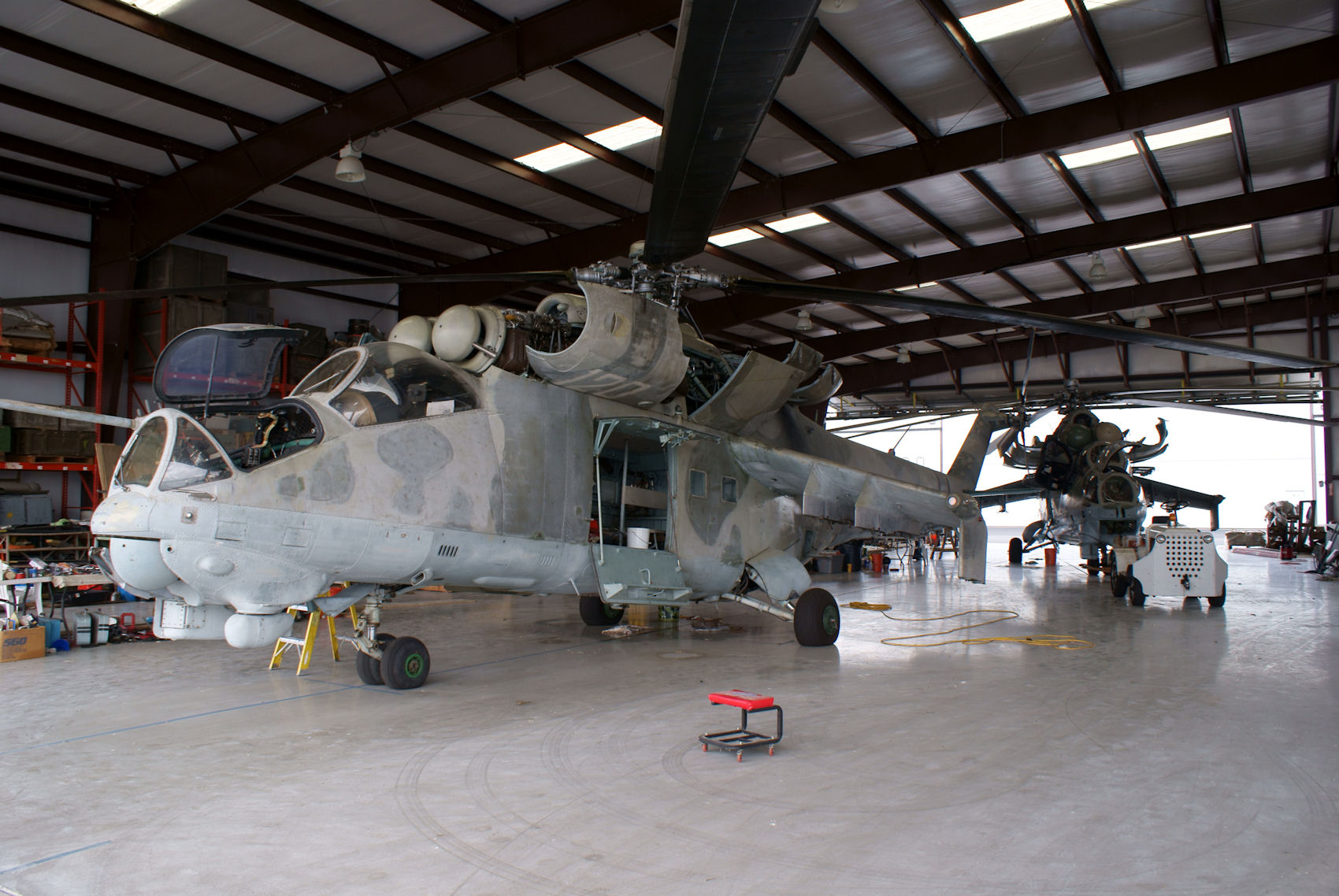
Mil Mi-24Ds at the museum

- Antonov An-2
- Aero L-29 Delfín
- Aero L-29 Delfín
- Aero L-29 Delfín
- Aero L-29 Delfín
- Aero L-29 Delfín
- Aero L-29 Delfín
- Aero L-29 Delfín
- Bell AH-1S Cobra
- Bell UH-1B Iroquois
- Fouga CM.170 Magister
- Hughes TH-55 Osage
- Mikoyan-Gurevich MiG-21
- Mil Mi-2
- Mil Mi-2
- Mil Mi-2
- Mil Mi-24
- Mil Mi-24
- Nanchang CJ-6A
- Nanchang CJ-6A
