= Loring Military Heritage Center =

Coordinates: 46°56′32.10″N 67°54′19.22″W

The Loring Military Heritage Center, near Limestone, Maine and named for pilot Charles J. Loring, Jr., was founded in 2005 by prior service military personnel and civilians who lived in the area. The museum was founded to preserve the rich history of the base, and the memories of the people who served there.

The museum recently completed an addition in 2011. This addition was funded by various fundraisers that the Loring Military Heritage Center put on as well as grants from the Maine Community Grant Foundation. The large addition houses many artifacts from the former runway as well as a KC135 Jet Engine.

== History ==
Loring Air Force Base, was an active service facility from 1953 to 1994. Prior to its dedication, it was known as Limestone Air Force Base, due to its being located in Limestone, Maine. Limestone Air Force Base was eventually renamed Loring Air Force Base in honor of Charles J. Loring, Jr., a Maine native and Medal of Honor recipient, who perished during the Korean War after crashing his plane into a gun emplacement, saving the lives of his fellow airmen. The indoor museum opened in 2006 within the base's old bank. The Loring Redevelopment Authority approved the center alongside an expansion of the Loring Defense Finance and Accounting Service. Current funding is obtained through donations, membership, gift shop sales, and admissions.

In 2007, the center expressed interest in acquiring a missile from the local American Legion chapter in Presque Isle, in order to restore it. The museum helped to also catalog artifacts from the base's former heating plant, which took two tries to demolish it In August 2012, the Center hosted the base's first official reunion. The reunion proved to be a success as 700+ people from as far as Alaska attended the event.

2014 saw the Center host a second reunion at Loring. This event saw many more prior Loring Veterans, Civilians, Families and interested people come out to enjoy the weekend. Many former base areas were opened to allow visitors a chance to see, what Loring was all about. A dinner dance on Saturday hosted by the Center which brought together 110 people who shared stories about the Center and life at Loring A.F.B. On Sunday a driving tour was held at the former Weapons Storage Area.

== Displays ==
The museum contains an AGM-28 Hound Dog missile, various mementos from the base's history, and other displays. The missile also has been painted in authentic markings which it would have carried when it was stationed at Loring. Additionally, the center contains mementos from the base's former Central Heat Plant, which was demolished in 2011. According to the center, this was done because many people were interested in seeing the plant's history preserved.
