= North Bay Air Museum =

- Location within California
- Location: Sonoma, California
- Coordinates: 38.2241°N 122.4564°W
- Type: Aviation museum
- Founder: Chris Prevost
- Website: www.northbayairmuseum.org

The North Bay Air Museum is an aviation museum located at Sonoma Valley Airport in Sonoma, California.

== History ==
=== Background ===
Chris Prevost became interested in aviation after visiting the Sonoma Valley Airport on a field trip. In 1984, he took over the Vintage Aircraft Company, which had been founded in 1975, and began offering rides in Stearman biplanes. Eventually, he became co-owner of the airport in 2002 and bought it outright in 2008. The following year he flew a P-40 that had been purchased as a wreck from New Zealand and under restoration since 2004.

=== Establishment ===
Prevost began planning for the California Aviation Heritage Museum in June 2010.

== Collection ==
- Aviat Husky
- Beechcraft D18S
- Christen Eagle
- Curtiss P-40N Warhawk – on loan
- de Havilland Canada DHC-1 Chipmunk
- North American P-51D Mustang – on loan
- Piper L-4B Grasshopper
- Pipistrel Virus

== Programs ==
The museum offers rides in two aircraft on loan to it.
