= B-29 Doc Hangar, Education and Visitors Center =

- The museum in 2026

- Location within Kansas
- Location: Wichita, Kansas
- Coordinates: 37.6613°N 97.4229°W
- Type: Aviation museum
- Website: www.b29doc.com

The B-29 Doc Hangar, Education and Visitors Center is an aviation museum located at the Eisenhower National Airport in Wichita, Kansas.

== History ==
=== Background ===
After sitting at bombing range at Naval Air Weapons Station China Lake for 42 years, Doc was recovered in 1998 by a team led by Tony Mazzolini. The group Doc's Friends was started in 2013 to support the effort and, following 3 years of work, the airplane flew again in 2016.

=== Establishment ===
The group unveiled plans for a 32,000 sq ft (3,000 m^{2}) building in July 2017 and broke ground September. Doc was moved into the hangar in November 2018 and it opened to the public on 26 January 2019.

== Facilities ==
The facility is made up of a 24,000 sq ft (2,200 m^{2}) hangar and the 8,000 sq ft (740 m^{2}) John E. Turner Family Education & Visitors Center.

== Collection ==
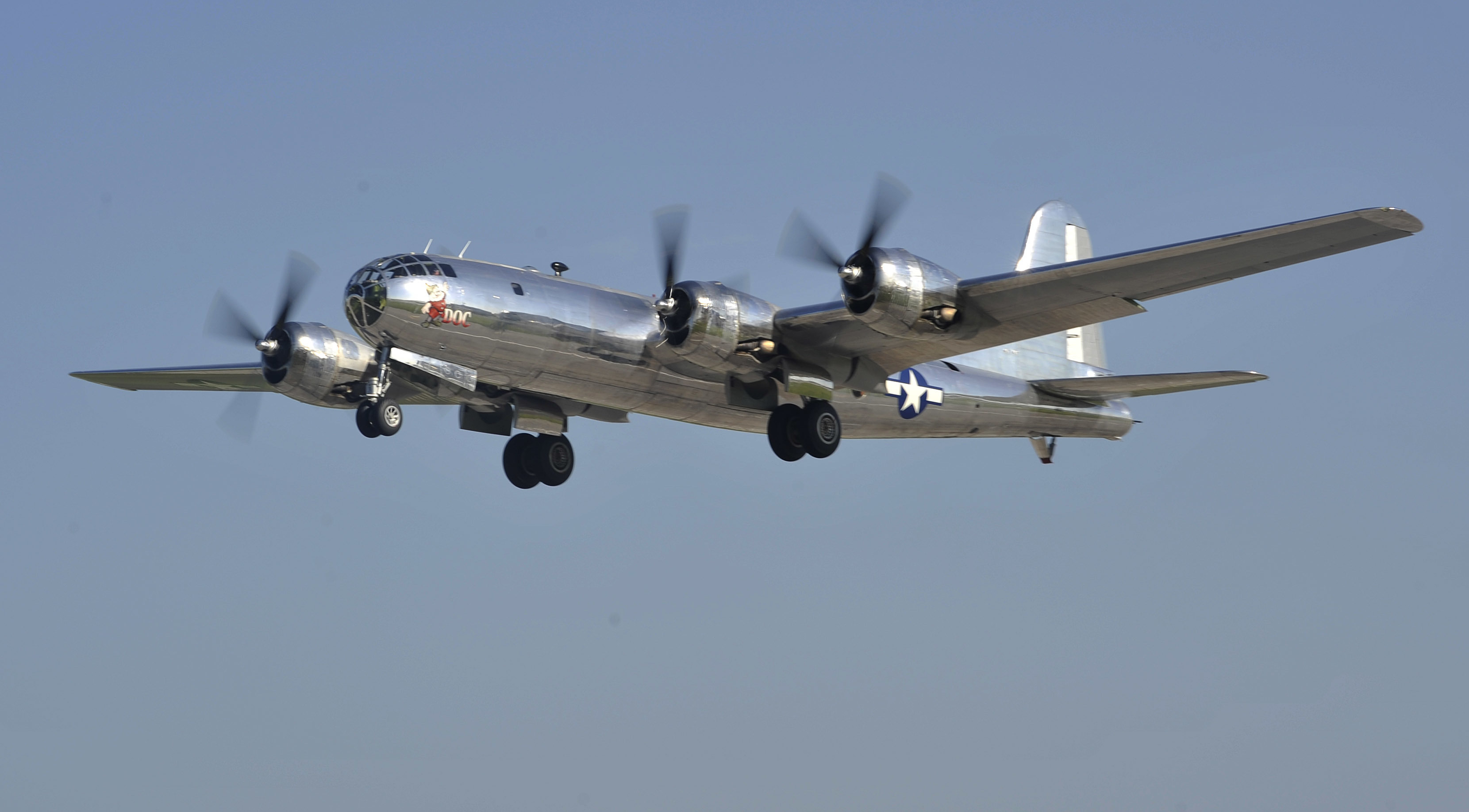
The museum's B-29 at McConnell Air Force Base in 2016

- Boeing B-29 Superfortress 44-69972 "Doc"

== Programs ==
The museum tours Doc around the United States during the spring and summer. During this tour it offers rides on the aircraft.
