= Zeppelin Museum Zeppelinheim =

Coordinates: 50.0349°N 8.6145°E

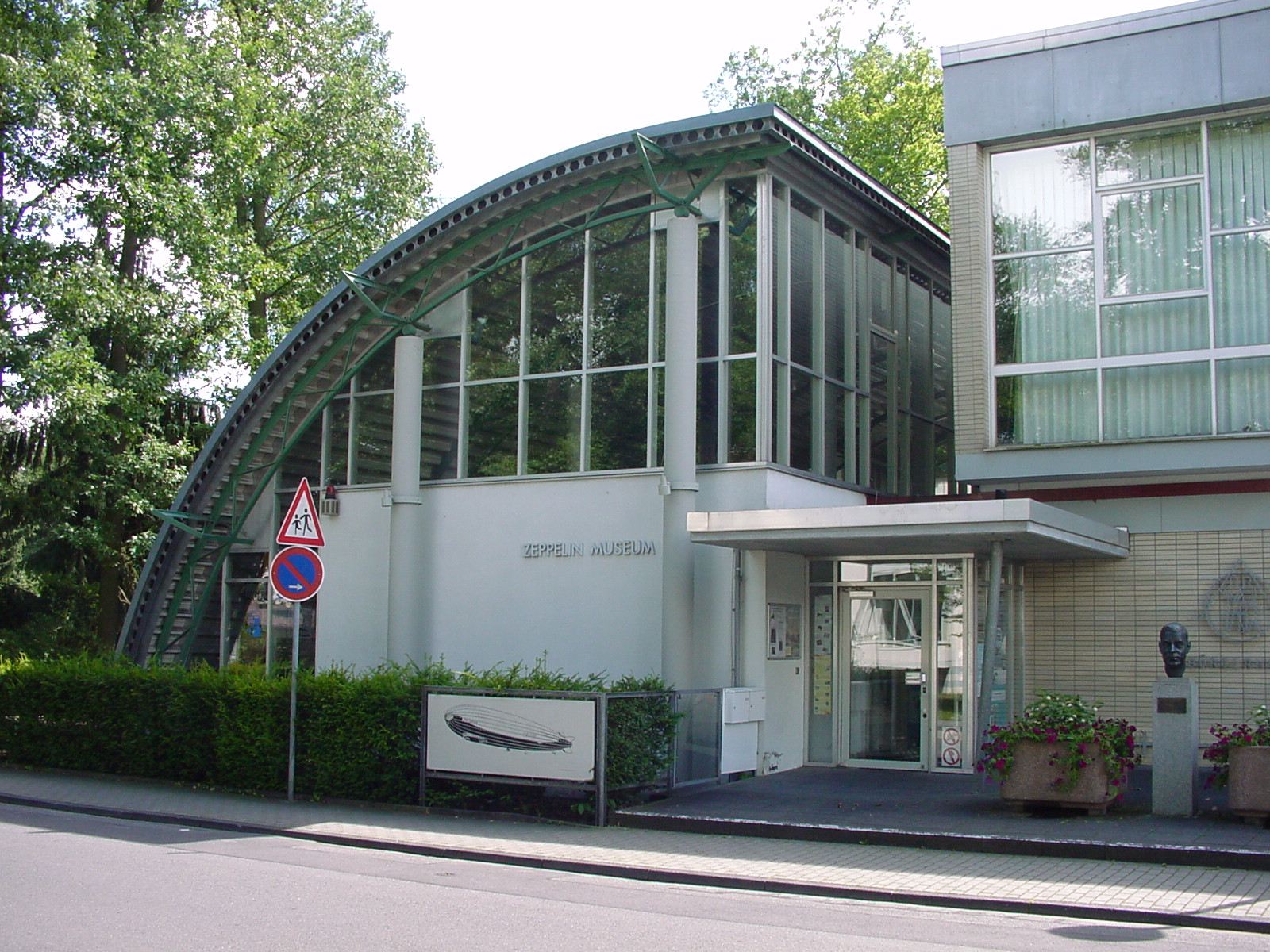
Museum entrance

Zeppelin Museum Zeppelinheim is located in Neu-Isenburg near Frankfurt am Main. The design of the museum building, constructed in 1988, resembles a quarter section of the hull of the LZ 10. The transport airships Graf Zeppelin and Hindenburg, as well as the second Graf Zeppelin (LZ 130), were based near the present site of the museum, on a site later occupied by the Rhein-Main Air Base.

== Virtual Museum ==
The Zeppelin Museum Zeppelinheim offers a virtual tour available in English, German, and French.

- Virtual Zeppelin Museum Zeppelinheim
