= Swift Museum =

- Location within Tennessee
- Established: 2008
- Location: Athens, Tennessee
- Coordinates: 35.3967°N 84.5583°W
- Type: Aviation museum
- Founder: Charlie Nelson
- Website: www.swiftmuseumfoundation.org/museum

The Swift Museum is an aviation museum located at the McMinn County Airport in Athens, Tennessee.

== History ==
=== Background ===
The Swift Museum Foundation was established by Charlie Nelson in 1968. In the early 1980s, it purchased the Globe Swift type certificate and production tooling from Univair.

It acquired the first production Swift in 2007.

=== Museum construction ===
The foundation announced plans for a 10,000 sq ft (930 m^{2}) hangar in April 2008. This would allow the museum to consolidate aircraft that had been stored in multiple buildings around the airport. After five years, ground was broken on the first phase, a 3,200 sq ft (300 m^{2}) office and parts storage building, in March 2013, and it was completed later that year.

After signing a new lease with the airport that expanded the size of its parcel in 2015, the second phase, a 6,400 sq ft (590 m^{2}) hangar, opened the following year.

The third phase, a 3,200 sq ft (300 m^{2}) expansion for additional parts, was finished in time for the 50th anniversary of the foundation in October 2018. In the meantime, the museum had worked with AirCorps Library to digitize its collection of drawings and manuals.

The sole LoPresti Fury was donated to the museum in 2019.

== Collection ==
- Globe GC-1A Swift
- Globe GC-1B Swift
- Johnson Rocket 125
- Temco T-35 Buckaroo
- Temco T-35 Buckaroo

== Events ==
The museum holds an annual fly-in.
