= James Rogers McConnell Air Museum =

- Location within North Carolina
- Established: 2013
- Location: Carthage, North Carolina
- Coordinates: 35.3366°N 79.4375°W
- Type: Aviation museum
- Founder: Roland Gilliam
- Website: www.moorecountyairmuseum.org

The James Rogers McConnell Air Museum is an aviation museum located at the Gilliam-McConnell Airfield in Carthage, North Carolina focused on aviation in World War I.

== History ==
=== Background ===
Roland Gilliam purchased 120 acres (0.49 km^{2}) acres near Carthage, North Carolina and began building Gilliam-McConnell Airfield in 1989. (Note: The airport was sold to Dr. Rick Hilliard in 2021.) The airport was completed in 1994 when the 2,500 ft (760 m) runway was paved. It was followed by the construction of several houses and the opening of a restaurant in 2008. (Note: The restaurant was set up in a building salvaged from Sandhills Community College.)

=== Establishment ===
After learning about James Rogers McConnell, a North Carolina pilot killed in World War I, Gilliam was motivated to establish the museum in Fall 2013. It opened ten years later on 23 September 2023.

The museum received a donation of over 2,500 model airplanes in 2019.

== Exhibits ==
An airport beacon is on display at the museum.

== Collection ==
- Aero Commander 500
- Curtis P-40 Warhawk – replica
- Grumman OV-1 Mohawk
- Nieuport XI – 7/8 scale replica
- Royal Aircraft Factory S.E.5a – 7/8 scale replica
