= List of surviving Consolidated PBY Catalinas =

PBY Catalina Survivors identifies Catalinas on display, and includes aircraft designations, status, serial numbers, locations and additional information. The Consolidated PBY Catalina was a twin-engined American flying boat of the 1930s and 1940s, designed by Consolidated Aircraft Co. Several variants were built at five US and Canadian manufacturing plants.

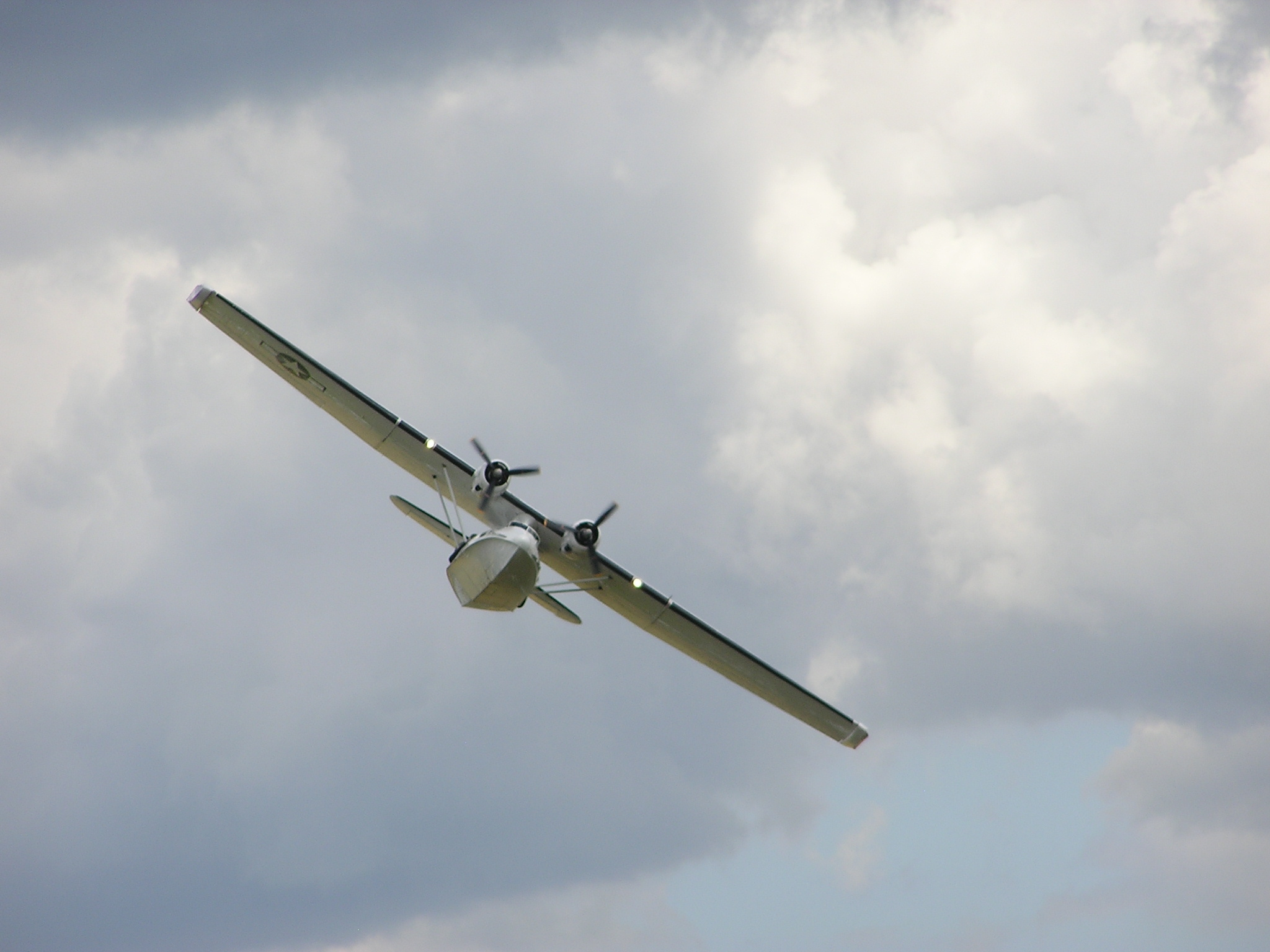
Surviving Canso A G-PBYA at Duxford Flying Legends 2007

== Surviving aircraft ==
These complete examples of Catalinas have been preserved or restored to various levels including markings, nose art, original or representative paint schemes, and are on display at museums or at military bases, or are active aircraft potentially viewable at air events.

By default, 5-digit numeric serials known as Bureau Numbers (BuNo) are as issued by the US Navy Bureau of Aeronautics (BuAer), presented here without the imaginary "BuNo" prefix. 4-digit serials in the form 9xxx, and 5-digit serials in the form 1xxxx are as issued to Royal Canadian Air Force aircraft.

Status Codes:

D = Display
A = Airworthy
S = Stored
R = Under restoration

Designation	Original serial	Displayed identity	Status	Current location				Notes
Designation	Original serial	Displayed identity	Status	Owner/airport	Town	Region	Country	Notes
PBY-5A	2459	16-218 (MLD)	A	Collings Foundation	Stow	Massachusetts	United States	Under restoration to original configuration
PBY-5A	5021	CF-HFL	R	Atlantic Canada Aviation Museum	Halifax	Nova Scotia	Canada	
PBY-5A	8109	48382 (RNoAF)	D	Flyhistorisk Museum, Sola	Stavanger	Rogaland	Norway	ex Royal Danish Airforce
PBY-5	8272	A24-46 (RAAF)	S	Whaleworld	Albany	Western Australia	Australia	
PBY-5	8317	8317	D	National Naval Aviation Museum (NAS Pensacola)	Pensacola	Florida	United States	
PBY-5A	33966	N3936A	D	Kermit Weeks, Fantasy of Flight	Polk City	Florida	United States	
PBY-5A	33968	N84857	D	Pacific Northwest Naval Air Museum	Oak Harbor	Washington	United States	
PBY-5A	33993	434033 (USAAF)	D	McChord Air Museum (McChord Field)	Lakewood	Washington	United States	
PBY-5A	34027	N9505C	R	Yanks Air Museum		California	United States	Removed from Ephrata, WA in 2024
PB2B-2	44248	VH-ASA	D	The Powerhouse Museum	Sydney	New South Wales	Australia	
PBY-5A	46456	46456	R	Historic Aircraft Restoration Project (Floyd Bennett Field)	New York City	New York	United States	N4582T
PBY-5A	46457	46457	D	Rescue Museum (Kirtland AFB)	Albuquerque	New Mexico	United States	
PBY-5A	46522	46522	A	Erickson Aircraft Collection	Madras	Oregon	United States	N2172N
PBY-5A	46539	PB-505 (AURI)	D	Dirgantara Mandala Museum (Adisucipto International Airport)	Yogyakarta	Java	Indonesia	
PBY-5A	46582	6582 (USN)	D	Naval Air Station Jacksonville Collection	Jacksonville	Florida	United States	
PBY-5A	46590	N68756	S	Mark Pilkington	Midland	Texas	United States	
PBY-5A	46595	4433879 (USAAF)	D	National Museum of the United States Air Force (Wright-Patterson AFB)	Dayton	Ohio	United States	
PBY-5A	46596	DR.1-1 (SPAF)	D	Museo del Aire	Madrid	Community of Madrid	Spain	
PBY-5A	46602	46602	D	National Naval Aviation Museum (NAS Pensacola)	Pensacola	Florida	United States	
PBY-5A	46624	N9502C	D	Aviation Heritage Museum	Perth	Western Australia	Australia	
PBY-6A	46643	6552 (FAB)	D	Brazilian Air Force (Belém Air Base)	Belém	Pará	Brazil	
PBY-6A	46644	VH-EAX	A	Qantas Founders Museum (Longreach Airport)	Longreach	Queensland	Australia	
PBY-6A (PBY-5A tail)	46645	FP535 (RAF)	D	Norwegian Aviation Museum (Bodø Airport)	Bodø	Nordland	Norway	
PBY-6A (PBY-5A tail)	46655	C-FIZU	D	Government of Newfoundland and Labrador	St. Anthony	Newfoundland and Labrador	Canada	
PBY-6A	46662	N4NC	A	Liberty Aviation Museum	Port Clinton	Ohio	United States	
PBY-6A	46665	VH-CAT	R	The Catalina Flying Memorial Ltd. (Bankstown Airport)	City of Bankstown	New South Wales	Australia	
PBY-6A	46679	A24-362 (RAAF)	A	Historical Aircraft Restoration Society	Illawarra Regional Airport	New South Wales	Australia	VH-PBZ
PBY-5A	48287	N287	R	Cavanaugh Air LLC	Addison	Texas	United States	
PBY-5A	48294	N9521C	A	Training Services Inc TA (Military Aviation Museum)	Virginia Beach	Virginia	United States	
PBY-5A	48317	16-212	R	MLD	Soesterberg	Utrecht	Netherlands	
PBY-5A	48334	N74821	D	Classic Flyers Museum	Tauranga	Bay of Plenty Region	New Zealand	
PBY-5A	48352	A24-88	R	Australian National Aviation Museum (Moorabbin Airport)	Melbourne	Victoria	Australia	
PBY-5A	48375	N96UC	R	World's Greatest Aircraft Collection	Polk City	Florida	United States	
PBY-5A	48406	48406	D	San Diego Air & Space Museum (Balboa Park)	San Diego	California	United States	
PBY-5A	48412	N7238Z	R	Rathmines Catalina Memorial Park Association	City of Lake Macquarie	New South Wales	Australia	under restoration for static display
PBY-5A	48423	JV928	R	Tunison Foundation, Inc.	Wappingers Falls	New York	United States	N423RS, shipped to St Lucie County Airport, Fort Pierce, Florida on 25 January 2015 from UK. Relocated to New York for restoration to airworthiness in multi-step move from 2022-2023.
PBY-5A	48426	48426	R	Carmacks Commercial Corp (Palm Springs Air Museum)	Palm Springs	California	United States	N31235, currently under restoration
PBY-6A	63993	L-866 (RDAF)	D	Royal Air Force Museum Cosford	Cosford	Shropshire	United Kingdom	
PBY-6A	64017	N285RA	R	Israeli Air Force Museum (Hatzerim Airbase)	Beersheba	Southern District	Israel	
PBY-6A	64035	L-861 (RDAF)	D	Danish Aviation Museum	Helsingør	North Zealand	Denmark	
PBY-6A	64054	HK-2115P	S	Privat	Cloppenburg	Lower Saxony	Germany	
PBY-6A (PBY-5A tail)	64064	EC-FMC	R	John Sterling	Ocaña	Province of Toledo	Spain	
PBY-6A	64072	N7057C	R	American Airpower Museum	Farmingdale	New York	United States	
PBY-6A	64092	N324FA	R	Commemorative Air Force (CAF)	Superior	Wisconsin	United States	
PBY-6A	64097	N7179Y	R	Commemorative Air Force (CAF)	Superior	Wisconsin	United States	
PBY-6A	64107	N9825Z	R	Frederick C Peterson	Moses Lake	Washington	United States	
OA-10A	44-33954	N57875	R	Alaska Aviation Heritage Museum	Anchorage	Alaska	United States	
OA-10A	44-33972	N483CV	R	Flying Cat Aviation	Sanford	Maine	United States	
OA-10A	44-34009	405 (FACh)	D	Museo Nacional Aeronáutico y del Espacio	Santiago	Santiago Province	Chile	
OA-10A	44-34037	N2763A	R	C F Nichols, Yanks Air Museum	Chino	California	United States	
OA-10A	44-34081	VH-SBV	D	Air Force Museum of New Zealand (Wigram Aerodrome)	Christchurch	Canterbury	New Zealand	ex-Cathay Pacific VR-HDH and built for USAAF as Canadian-Vickers OA-10A Canso
OA-10A	44-34085	CC-CDT	A	Ibero Chilena de Aviación	Santiago	Santiago Province	Chile	
OA-10A	44-34094	E1497 (RCAF)	D	The Town of Botwood	Botwood	Newfoundland and Labrador	Canada	
28-5AMC/Canso A	9742	N68740	D	Pima Air & Space Museum	Tucson	Arizona	United States	
28-5AMC/Canso A	9746	N5PY	R	Ron Ruble	Aurora	Oregon	United States	Bird Innovator, civilian experimental with 4 engines.
28-5AMC/Canso A	9750	N206M	R	Black Cat Aviation	Greybull	Wyoming	United States	
Canso A	9752	6527 (FAB)	D	Museu Aeroespacial (Afonsos Air Force Base)	Rio de Janeiro	Rio de Janeiro	Brazil	
Canso A	9767	N9767	A	Soaring by the Sea, LLC	Eugene	Oregon	United States	Originally RCAF; "Princess of the Stars"
Canso A	9810	47001 (SwAF)	D	Swedish Air Force Museum (Malmen Airbase)	Linköping	Östergötland County	Sweden	
Canso A	9815	C-FNJB	R	Evergreen Aviation & Space Museum	McMinnville	Oregon	United States	
Canso A	9830	C-FPQK	D	Fondation Aerovision Quebec/Quebec Air & Space Museum	Saint-Hubert	Quebec	Canada	
Canso A	9837	C-FCRP	D	North Atlantic Aviation Museum	Gander	Newfoundland and Labrador	Canada	
Canso A	9838	N4934H	D	Historic Aviation Memorial Museum	Tyler	Texas	United States	
Canso A	11005	433915 (USAAF)	A	Catalina Aircraft Ltd (Duxford Aerodrome)	Duxford	Cambridgeshire	United Kingdom	G-PBYA
Canso A	11024	C-FUAW	A	Pacific Flying Boats	North Saanich	British Columbia	Canada	
Canso A	11042	31-P-5 (USN)	A	Athenian Airlift Services	Athens	Attica	Greece	5B-PBY
Canso A	11047	N413PB	D	Hans Lauridsen	Buckeye	Arizona	United States	Aircraft significantly damaged. Update: As of October 2023 the aircraft appears to be undergoing scrapping due to the extensive damage.
Canso A	11054	NZ4017 (RNZAF)	A	The New Zealand Catalina Preservation Society	Auckland	Auckland Region	New Zealand	ZK-PBY
Canso A	11060	A24-104 (RAAF)	D	RAAF Museum (RAAF Williams)	Melbourne	Victoria	Australia	
Canso A	11074	N222FT	A	Wilson C Edwards	Big Spring	Texas	United States	
Canso A	11084	9754 (RCAF)	A	Canadian Warplane Heritage Museum (John C. Munro Hamilton International Airport)	Hamilton	Ontario	Canada	C-FPQL
Canso A	11087	11087 (RCAF)	D	Canada Aviation and Space Museum (Ottawa/Rockcliffe Airport)	Ottawa	Ontario	Canada	
Canso A	11088	C-FPQM	A	Exploits Valley Air Services	Gander	Newfoundland and Labrador	Canada	
Canso A	11089	N427CV	A	National Museum of World War II Aviation	Colorado Springs	Colorado	United States	
Canso A	11091	C-FNJC	D	Government of Newfoundland and Labrador	Goose Bay	Newfoundland and Labrador	Canada	
Canso A	11093	CF-NJL	S^{[A]}	David Dorosh / Gananoque Airport	Gananoque	Ontario	Canada	
Canso A	11094	C-FNJE	A	Fairview Aircraft Restoration Society (FARS)	Fairview	Alberta	Canada	
Catalina I	FP216 (RAF)	(none)	D	National Naval Aviation Museum (NAS Pensacola)	Pensacola	Florida	United States	Fuselage only with port side skin removed.
PBY-5A	53602	53602 (FAE)	D	Museo Aeronáutico de la Fuerza Aérea (Old Mariscal Sucre International Airport)	Quito	Pichincha Province	Ecuador	
PBY-5	2305	A24-30 (RAAF)	D	Catalina Memorial Park (Lake Boga Flying Boat Base)	Lake Boga	Victoria	Australia	

^{A} May be Airworthy.
