= Forrest Bird =

American physician

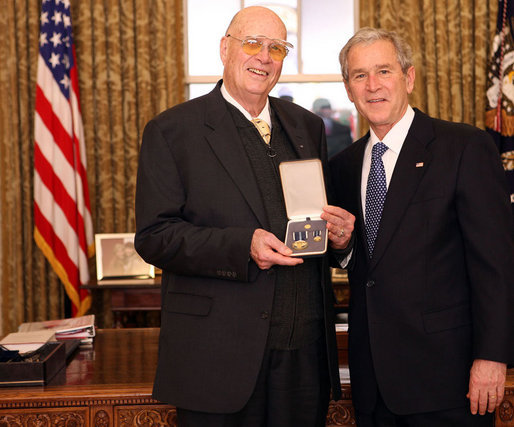
- Forrest Bird (left) receiving the Presidential Citizens Medal from President George W. Bush (right) in 2008
- Born: June 9, 1921; Stoughton, Massachusetts
- Died: August 2, 2015 (aged 94); Sagle, Idaho
- Education: Northrop University (ScD); Pontifícia Universidade Católica de Campinas (MD)
- Known for: Bird Universal Medical Respirator (1958)
- Spouses: Mary Moran (m.1945); Dominique Deckers (m. 1988); Pamela Riddle (m. 1999)
- Children: Catherine Bird
- Awards: National Inventors Hall of Fame; Presidential Citizens Medal; National Medal of Technology and Innovation (2009)
- Scientific career
- Fields: Pulmonology, Intensive Care
- Academic advisors: Andre Cournad

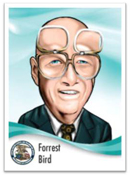
USPTO trading card featuring Bird.

Forrest Morton Bird (June 9, 1921 – August 2, 2015) was an American aviator, inventor, and biomedical engineer. He is best known for having created some of the first reliable mass-produced mechanical ventilators for acute and chronic cardiopulmonary care.

== Biography ==
Bird was born in Stoughton, Massachusetts. Bird became a pilot at an early age with his father's encouragement. By age 14, he flew his first solo fight.

By age 16 he was working to obtain multiple major pilot certifications. Bird enlisted with the United States Army Air Corps, and entered active duty in 1941 as a technical air training officer due to his advanced qualifications. This rank, combined with the onset of World War II, gave him the opportunity to pilot almost every aircraft in service, including early jet aircraft and helicopters.

The newest models of aircraft were capable of exceeding altitudes at which humans can breathe, even with 100% oxygen supplementation, introducing the risk of hypoxia. Bird discovered an oxygen regulator in a crashed German bomber he was ferrying to the U.S. for study seemed to contain a pressure breathing circuit. He took the oxygen regulator home, studied it, and made it more functional. It became the standard design for high-altitude oxygen regulators for most military aircraft until recent time. Bird studied medicine " ... to understand the human body and its stress in flight". This led to him developing efficient respirators and ventilators. In 1957 he released the Bird Mark 7 ventilator, the first mass-produced ventilator.

In 1967, Bird developed the Bird Innovator, a conversion of the Consolidated PBY Catalina amphibian aircraft, the aircraft being based at Palm Springs until 1976. His company was Bird Oxygen Breathing Equipment Inc, later renamed Bird Corporation.

Bird resided in Sagle, Idaho, close to the Canada–US border which is where his home, production facilities, museum and ranch were located. Bird collected and restored old planes, old cars, and motorcycles.

Forrest and Pamela Bird opened the Bird Aviation Museum and Invention Center in July 2007, with aviator Patty Wagstaff cutting a ceremonial ribbon at the end of the runway while flying. The Bird's are the founders and owners of the museum, which showcases Bird's various aircraft and inventions. On December 10, 2008, Bird received the Presidential Citizens Medal from President George Bush. The United States honored him for his groundbreaking contributions and for his work to keep America at the forefront of discovery. On October 7, 2009, President Barack Obama awarded Bird the National Medal of Technology and Innovation, a recognition of his "outstanding contributions to the promotion of technology for the improvement of the economic, environmental or social well-being of the United States."

Bird died at the age of 94 of natural causes at his Sagle, Idaho home on August 2, 2015.

== Mechanical ventilators ==
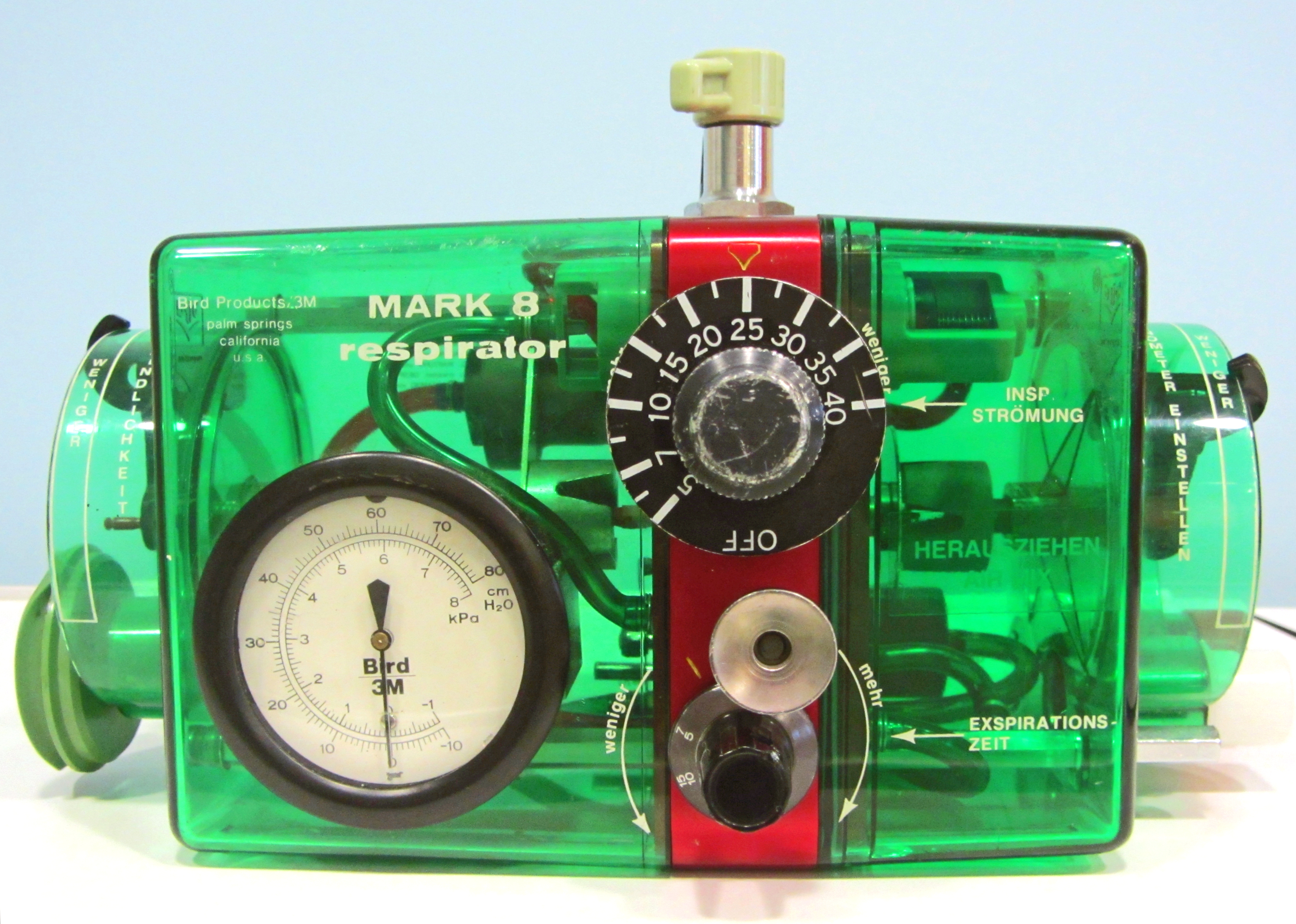
Bird Mark 8 ventilator

=== The first "Bird" units ===
All of Bird's ventilators were contained in transparent plastic cases. Bird's rationale for see-through encasements for his machines was a stroke of genius: he thought if people could see the inner workings of mechanical devices, they would understand them better, and be able to use, fix, and apply them better in the real world. Bird created a car unit which was tested on seriously ill patients with limited success. His first prototype consisted of strawberry shortcake tins and a doorknob. Most of these first units were sold to the Army, in the original format of tins and the doorknob. Further revision resulted in the 1955 release of the "Bird Universal Medical Respirator" (sold as the Bird Mark 7 Respirator and informally called the "Bird"), a small green box that became familiar to hospital patients soon after its introduction. The Bird Mark 8 added the capabilities of NEEP (Negative End Expiratory Pressure). This was frequently used to power a set of fluidic servos (sort of relays.) He subsequently made a ventilator for infants, nicknamed the "Babybird". This device was one of several devices that appeared on the market designed to effectively ventilate small children and infants. These devices played a significant role in reducing the rate of breathing-related infant mortality from 70% to 10%. The Bird Mark 7 Respirator is still in use around the world. In addition, he produced the Fluid Control Device.

=== Accolades ===
Bird was awarded the Lifetime Scientific Achievement Award in 1985 by the American Association for the Advancement of Science (AAAS), receiving a second award in September 2005. He continued to contribute to the field of pulmonary science by participating in the development of the VDR, a ventilator that permits management of the most challenging patients including ARDS, trauma and inhalation injury. In 1995, Bird was inducted into the National Inventors Hall of Fame. He was named "Inventor of the Week" by MIT in February 2001. The American Respiratory Care Foundation names one of its annual awards after Bird.

=== History of Bird Corp. ===
- 1965: First factory assembly line rolls out a medical respirator for home health, the Mark III.
- 1971: Bird introduces first infant ventilator.
- 1978: Bird sells his namesake company to 3M, which took it public.
- 1984: 3M sells Bird Products to the management group of a competitor, Bird Medical Technologies Inc.
- 1987: The Bird 6400ST is released, the first new-generation ventilator.
- 1990: Bird Medical Technologies goes public, and is traded on NASDAQ under the ticker, BMTI.
- 1992: Bird Medical, reporting $36.5 million in sales in 1991, lays off 21 of 211 workers, citing poor economic conditions and falling sales. Despite the downturn, construction of its new, 120,000-square-foot (11,000 m^{2}) building at 1100 Bird Center Drive, its present site, continues.
- 1995: Thermo Electron Corp., which acquired Bird in a $67 million buyout of Bird stock, moves a Riverside-based subsidiary into the Palm Springs location. That year, Bird is inducted into the National Inventors Hall of Fame.
- 2002: Through acquisition and consolidation, the venture becomes a part of VIASYS Respiratory Care.
- 2009: Cardinal Health Inc., a Fortune 20 company based in Dublin, Ohio, that was spun off from its parent company to the wholly owned subsidiary, CareFusion Corp. The year before, Cardinal Health relocated three sister companies to the Palm Springs operation: Bear Medical of Riverside, SensorMedics Corp. of Yorba Linda and EME Medical of Brighton, England.
