= Pacific Northwest Naval Air Museum =

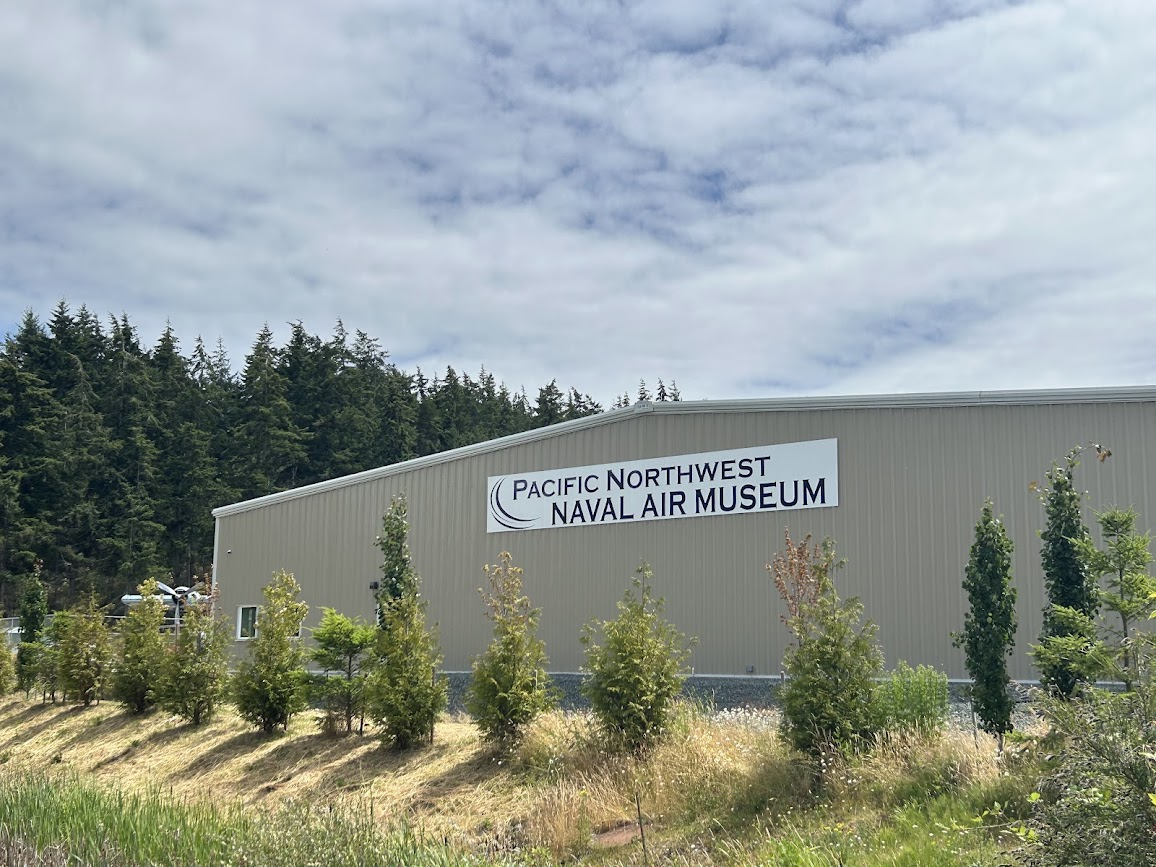
- Museum exterior with the PBY visible at left

- Location within Washington (state)
- Established: 2004
- Location: 545 Ault Field Road; Bldg D Oak Harbor, Washington
- Coordinates: 48°19′29″N 122°38′37″W
- Type: Aviation museum
- Director: Barry Meldrum
- President: Judy Lewis
- Website: www.pnwnam.org

The Pacific Northwest Naval Air Museum is an aviation museum located in Oak Harbor, Washington, United States, focused on the history of Naval Air Station Whidbey Island.

== History ==
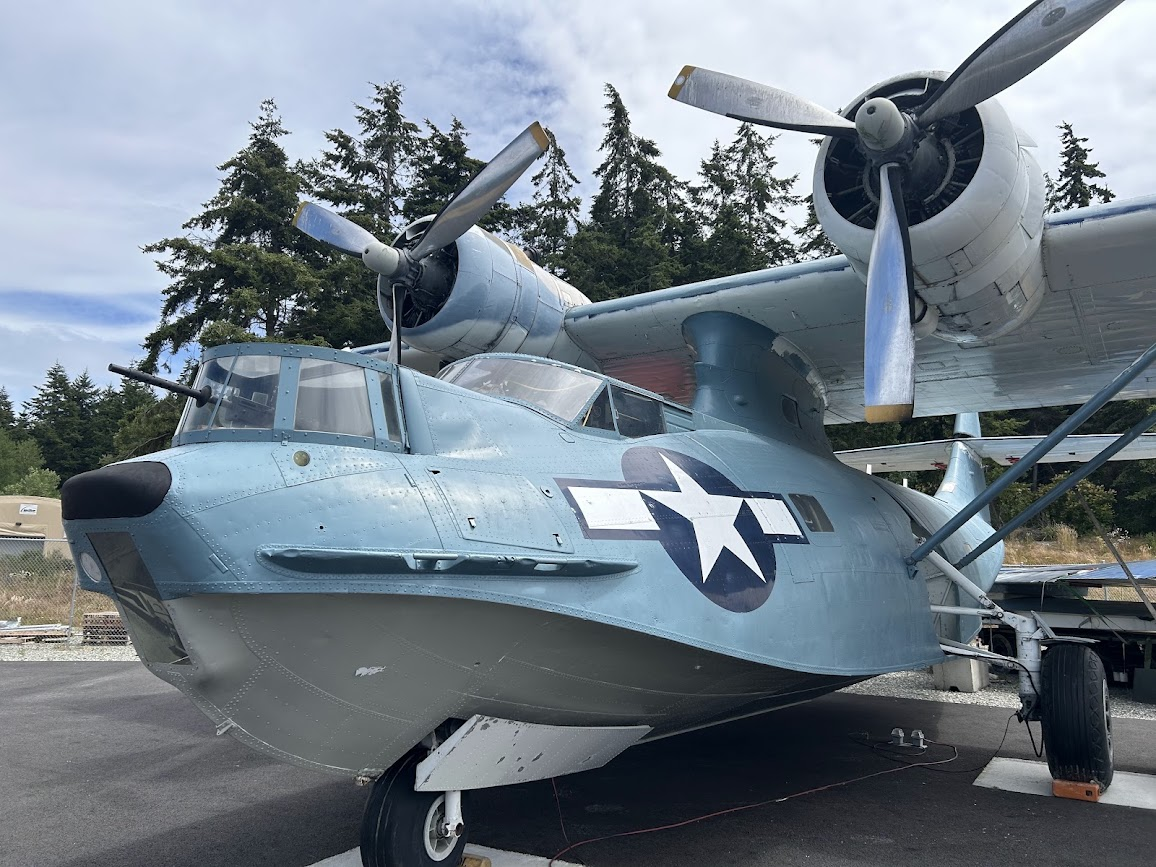
PBY Catalina in the PNWNAM collection

=== Background ===
On September 22, 1998, a group of 14 World War II veterans and their wives met at the Chief Petty Officer Club at NAS Whidbey Island. There they decided to form an organization and the following year they established the PBY Memorial Association.

The group began an attempt to purchase a PBY in 2002, but it was eventually unsuccessful. In the meantime, it began work on a documentary about the history of Oak Harbor. The group changed its name to the PBY Memorial Foundation in 2003.

=== Establishment ===
The PBY-Naval Air Museum opened in an abandoned gas station in 2004.

=== Move to NAS Whidbey Island ===
The museum moved into Building 12 on NAS Whidbey Island in February 2008. (Note: The building was renamed Simard Hall in 2010.) The site was less than ideal as security restrictions limited access. In 2010, the museum was finally able to purchase a PBY (BuNo 33968) and it was moved to the base that June. Plans to acquire a Douglas A-3 Skywarrior were cancelled in 2012.

=== Move to Oak Harbor ===
After its lease with the base ended, the museum was forced to move to a 4,500 sq ft (420 m^{2}) former furniture store in downtown Oak Harbor in 2014, where it opened on July 25. The PBY was towed to a parking lot across the street from the new location in January 2015, where it opened to the public three months later The following year it opened a display about navy hospital corpsmen.

The museum began efforts to move what was possibly the last remaining Homoja Hut in 2018 after it was threatened by development.

The museum changed its name to Pacific Northwest Naval Air Museum by June 2020.

Construction on a new facility to house the PBY began in August 2023. In preparation for the move, plans were made to restore the aircraft in March 2024.

== Facilities ==
The Gene Guthrie Memorial Library is located at the museum.

== Exhibits ==
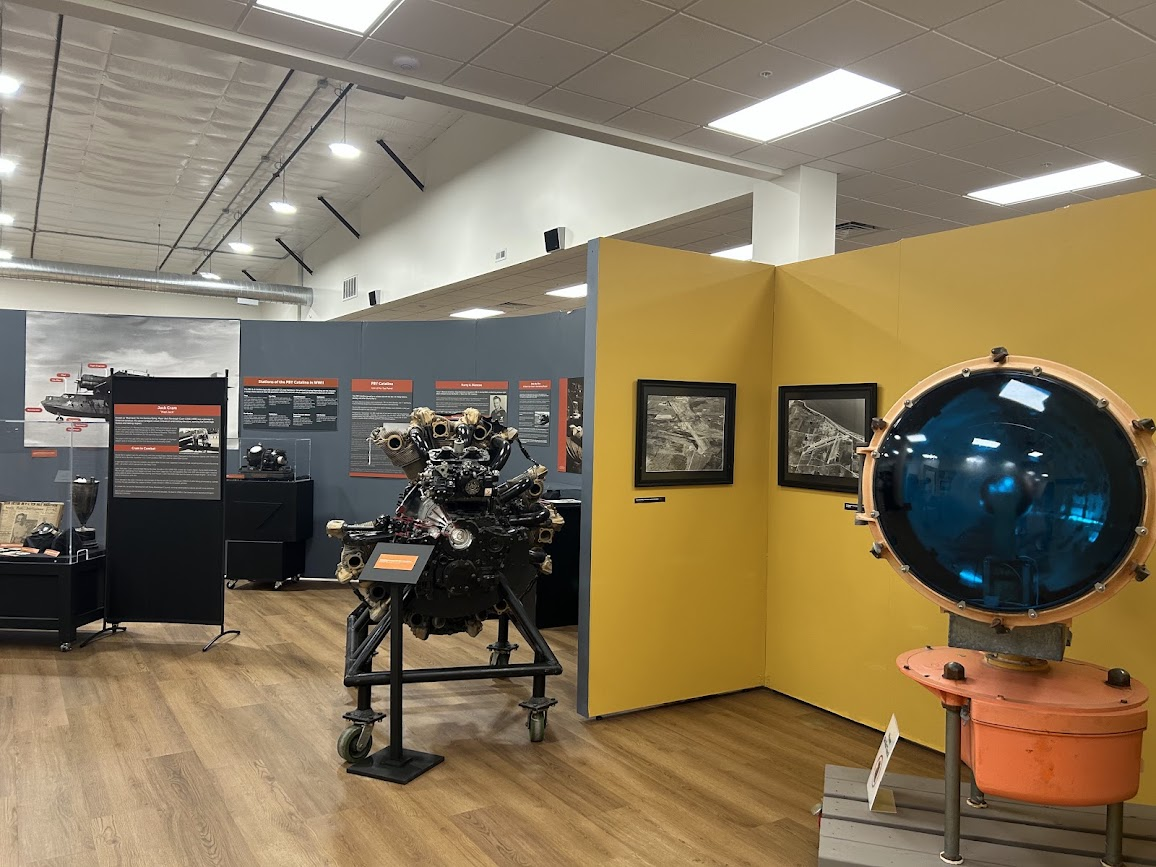
Signal light and PBY exhibits

The museum has 11 display areas, which include a PBY maintenance shop, a MiG-21 tail, Mk-82 bombs, collections on the Korean, Vietnam, Gulf, Afghanistan, and Iraq wars, and an MIA memorial. Exhibits at the museum cover naval and local history, including content about Whidbey Island’s Indigenous and settlement history. Interactive exhibits at the museum include two flight simulators, a night-vision room, and a nose turret from a PBY that visitors may enter. The organization owns a scale model of a Nimitz-class aircraft carrier that it takes to parades. It also has an EA-6B service trainer.

- Consolidated PBY-5A Catalina

== Events ==
The museum holds an annual community luncheon.

== See also ==
- Brunswick Naval Aviation Museum
- List of aviation museums
