= Brunswick Naval Aviation Museum =

- Location within Maine
- Established: 2009
- Location: Brunswick, Maine
- Coordinates: 43.8975°N 69.9280°W
- Type: Military aviation museum
- Website: www.bnamuseum.org

The Brunswick Naval Aviation Museum is a military aviation museum located at Brunswick Executive Airport in Brunswick, Maine focused on the history of Naval Air Station Brunswick.

== History ==
The museum was established in 2009 and opened in the former base chapel in 2011. It purchased the building in December 2015.

Following restoration work, a Lockheed P-3 Orion at the airport was rededicated in 2020. As a result of encroaching commercial development, the museum began fundraising to move the other airplane on display at the airport, a Lockheed P-2 Neptune, a half-mile closer to the museum in May 2022. It began restoring the airplane in the summer of 2023.

Meanwhile, the first phase of renovations to the museum, the replacement of a brick wall with windows and installation of an entrance walkway, began in May 2023. The new entrance is intended to be dedicated in September 2023 as part of a reunion of Naval Air Station Brunswick personnel.

The restoration of the P-2 was completed in July 2025.

== See also ==
- List of aviation museums
- Pacific Northwest Naval Air Museum
