= Bird Innovator =

American executive amphibious airplane

Innovator
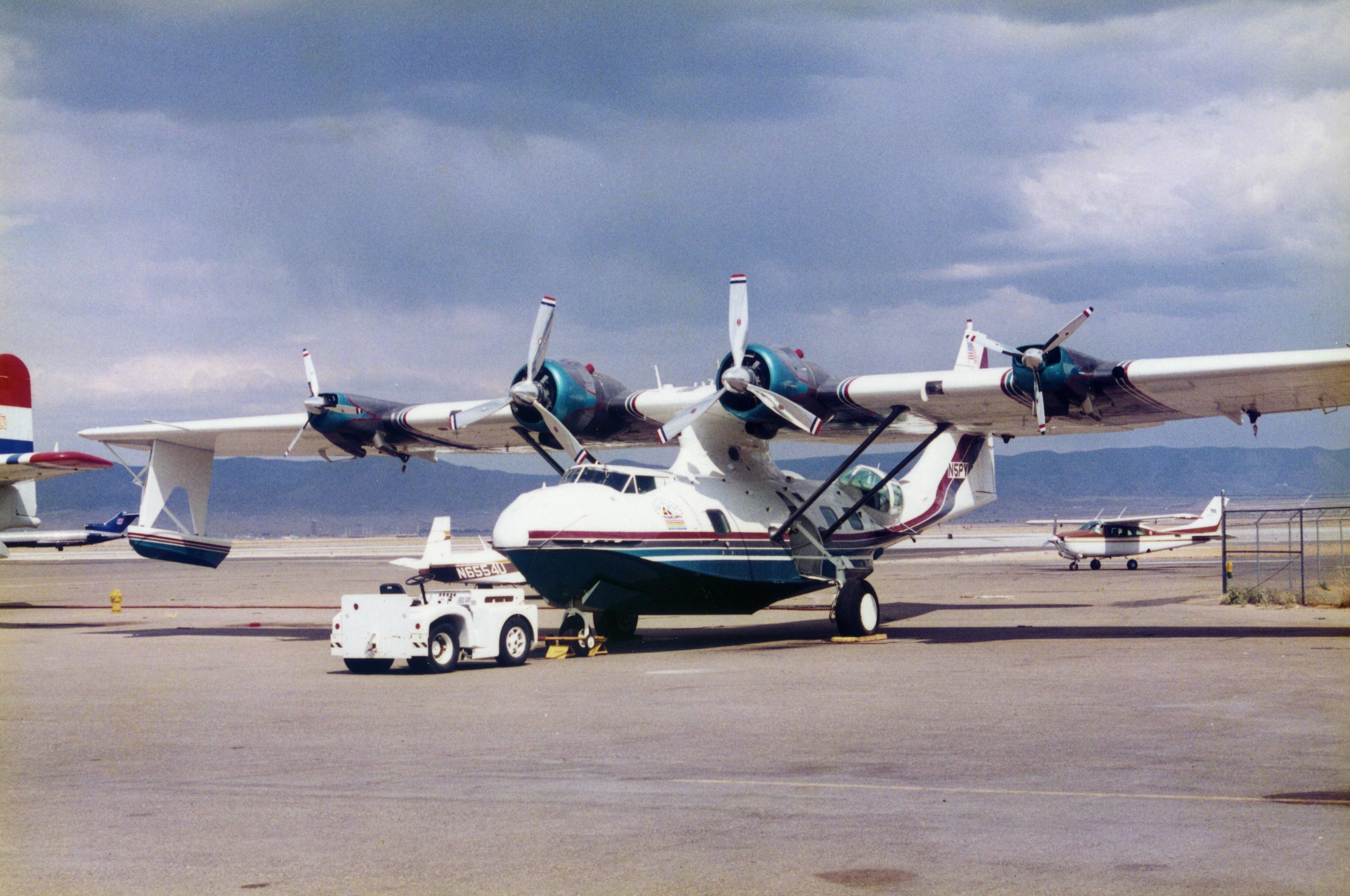

General information
- Type: Executive amphibian
- Manufacturer: Bird Corporation
- Designer: Forrest Bird
- Number built: 1

History
- First flight: 1967
- Developed from: PBY Catalina

The Bird Innovator was an American four-engined executive amphibious airplane modified from a Consolidated PBY Catalina by the Bird Corporation.

== Design and development ==
During the late 1960s Forrest Bird and his Bird Corporation developed a conversion for the PBY Catalina to improve performance.

The Catalina was modified by adding two 340 hp (254 kW) Lycoming GSO-480-B2D6 engines positioned outboard of the original Pratt & Whitney radials to increase range and performance. These engines and cowlings had originally been installed on the McKinnon four engine Grumman Goose. When they were removed by McKinnon to convert the Goose to twin turboprop power, they were purchased by Bird for his PBY Innovator conversion. Engineering for the Innovator conversion was performed by Spectro Engineering of Los Angeles.

The wing attach fittings were strengthened and fuel capacity increased by adding fuel bladders to the outer wing panels. The engineer's controls were previously moved to the cockpit by Southern California Air Service during their "Landseaair" conversion to allow operation without a Flight Engineer. Propeller control for the two Lycomings was electrical. The Lycoming's propellers were fully reversible, distinctly improving the handling dexterity on the water. The main engine propellers were controlled by the standard mechanical linkage. The larger "Super Cat" rudder and increased power main engines (1830–94) had been installed at an earlier time. The angle of incidence of the wing and horizontal surfaces were not modified during the conversion.

The effect of the extra engines exceeded expectations, such that it was capable of a cruising speed of 152 mph (244 km/h) on four engines, and of maintaining 124 mph with one of the main engines feathered. The original PBY cruised at about 125 mph. The downside of the Innovator conversion was the gross weight of the aircraft increased to over 29,000 lbs. This exceeded the 27,000 lbs maximum that the US Military considered safe for water operations.

== Operational history ==
Only one Innovator was converted, a 28-5AMC Canso A (This was a Consolidated built aircraft. Built in November 1941 (under a contract for Canada), registration N5907, formerly RCAF serial number 9746, which was already used by Dr. Bird as a flying classroom/salesroom for medical equipment. Bird Corporation registered it as N81RD, and sold it in 1976, when its registration reverted to N5907. In the late 1970s, Pyramid Corporation purchased the Innovator and converted it to a camera platform to count whales along the west coast of the Americas. A plastic bubble with camera was installed in the nose and cameras were installed in the right blister and air stair door.

The Innovator was stored in Titusville, Florida at the end of this contract. While in storage a local law enforcement official decided that, since it was a large seaplane, it must have been used for illegal purposes and the aircraft was confiscated. Many years of lawsuits later, the Innovator was exonerated but time and the Florida sun had taken its toll. In the early 1990s, a New Mexico aircraft salesmen bought the Innovator, registered it as N5PY and spent the better part of a year restoring the aircraft to flying status. In 1997, during inspection, the new owners found an improper repair to the main keel truss from an earlier gear-up landing in the 1960s.

The extent of the damage, the previous attempt at repair and corrosion issues showed the need for a major IRAN (Inspect and repair as necessary) of the aircraft. At this time it was decided that, due to the extreme weight gain and aging complexity of the Innovator conversion, returning the aircraft to its original twin engine "Landseaire" condition was the safest and best option for the future preservation of the aircraft. As of 2013, restoration continues with the bow, pylon, and tail sections completely restored and a complete new keel truss, keelson, stringers, and bottom skins currently being installed; currently registered as N5PY.

== Specifications (Innovator) ==
Data from Jane's All the World's Aircraft 1970-71

General characteristics

- Crew: 2
- Length: 63 ft 10 in (19.46 m)
- Wingspan: 104 ft 0 in (31.7 m)
- Height: 20 ft 2 in (6.15 m)
- Wing area: 1,400 sq ft (130 m^{2})
- Aspect ratio: 7.73
- Gross weight: 29,000 lb (13,154 kg) +
- Fuel capacity: 1,750 US gal (1,457 imp gal; 6,624 L) main tank + 375 US gal (312 imp gal; 1,420 L) in 3x additional bladder wing tanks
- Powerplant: 2 × Pratt & Whitney R-1830-94 Twin Wasp 14-cylinder air-cooled radial piston engines, 1,350 hp (1,010 kW) each
- Powerplant: 2 × Lycoming GSO-480-B2D6 6-cylinder air-cooled horizontally-opposed piston engines, 340 hp (250 kW) each driving 3-bladed Hartzell 83XF-3A fully-feathering reversible-pitch propellers
- Propellers: 3-bladed Hamilton Standard constant-speed propellers

Performance

- Cruise speed: 174 kn (200 mph, 322 km/h) maximum

- 137 kn (158 mph; 254 km/h) at 34,000 lb (15,422 kg) gross weight and 5,000 ft (1,524 m)
- 132 kn (152 mph; 244 km/h) at 64% power and 11,000 ft (3,353 m)

- 125 kn (144 mph; 232 km/h) starboard auxiliary engine feathered
- 124 kn (143 mph; 230 km/h) port auxiliary engine feathered
- 112 kn (129 mph; 207 km/h) both auxiliary engines feathered
- 110 kn (127 mph; 204 km/h) starboard main engine feathered
- 108 kn (124 mph; 200 km/h) port main engine feathered

- Service ceiling: 15,000 ft (4,600 m) one main engine inoperative

10,000 ft (3,048 m) with both port engines inoperative

- Rate of climb: 750 ft/min (3.8 m/s) at 75% power at sea level
- Take-off run: 1,000 ft (305 m) at 34,000 lb (15,422 kg)
- Take-off at 85% power: < 2,000 ft (610 m) at 34,000 lb (15,422 kg)

== See also ==
- List of PBY Catalina survivors
- List of flying boats and floatplanes
