= Consolidated PBY Catalina =

American 1930s flying boat

Consolidated Model 28 / PBY Catalina
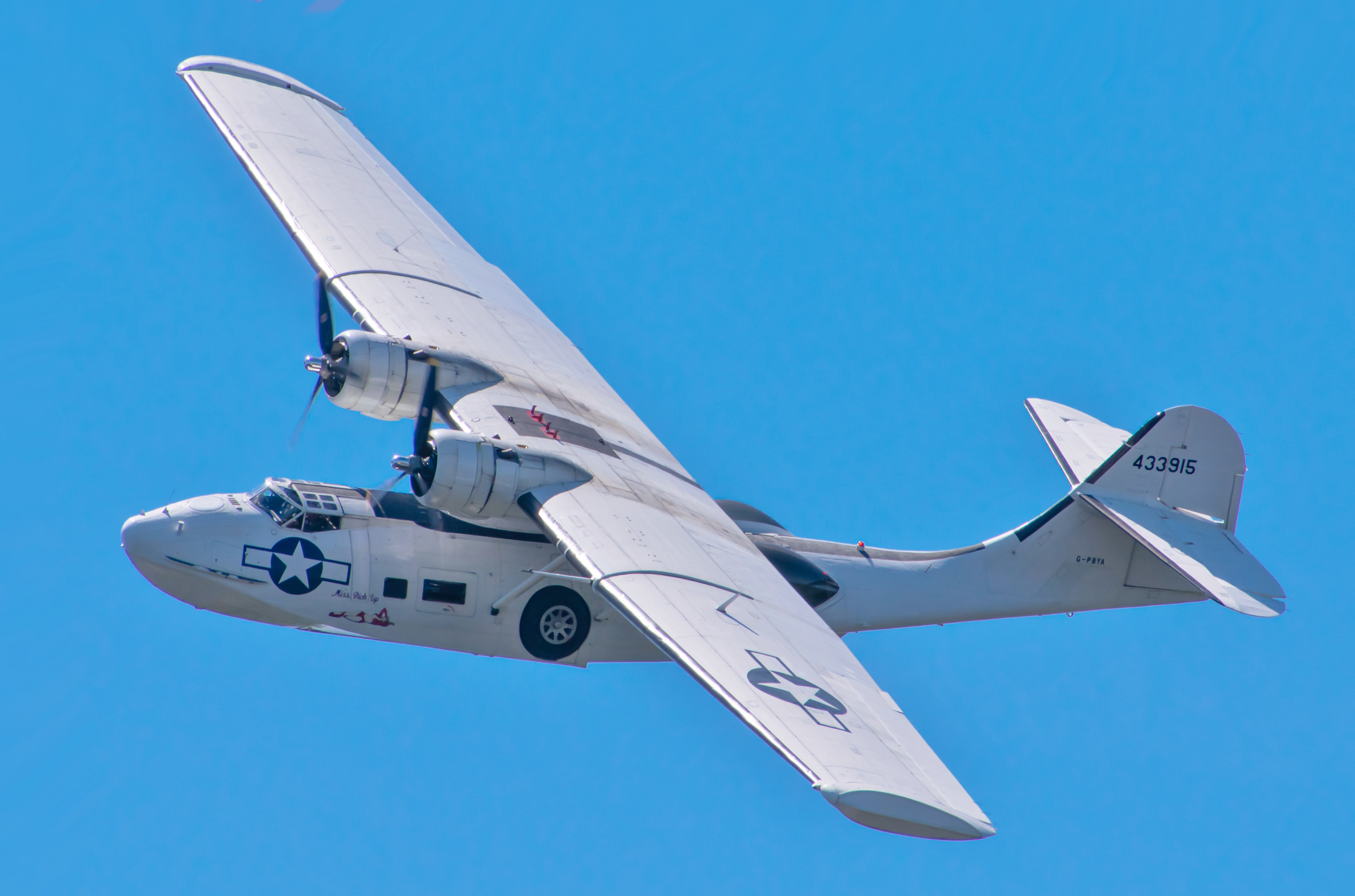
- A Canadian built Canso A representing a United States Army Air Forces OA-10 operated in the UK.

General information
- Type: Maritime patrol bomber, search and rescue seaplane
- National origin: United States
- Manufacturer: Consolidated Aircraft
- Built by: Boeing Canada (PB2B); Canadian Vickers (PBV); Consolidated Vultee (PB4); Naval Aircraft Factory (PBN); Soviet Gidrosamolet Transportnii factory at Taganrog (GST)
- Primary users: United States Navy United States Army Air Forces; Royal Air Force; Royal Canadian Air Force
- Number built: 3,308 (2,661 U.S.-built, 620 Canadian-built, 27 Soviet-built)

History
- Manufactured: 1936–1945
- Introduction date: October 1936, United States Navy
- First flight: 21 March 1935
- Retired: January 1957 (United States Navy Reserve); 1962 (Royal Canadian Air Force); 1982 (Brazilian Air Force)
- Variant: Bird Innovator

The Consolidated Model 28, more commonly known as the PBY Catalina (United States Navy designation), is an American flying boat and amphibious aircraft designed by Consolidated Aircraft in the 1930s and 1940s. In U.S. Army service, it was designated as the OA-10 and in Canadian service as the Canso, and it later received the NATO reporting name Mop. It was one of the most widely used seaplanes of World War II. Catalinas served with every branch of the United States Armed Forces as well as in the air forces and navies of many other nations.

The Catalina originated in 1933 through a United States Navy (USN) requirement for a patrol bomber seaplane capable of traversing substantial distances across open ocean to disrupt enemy supply lines. Consolidated responded with the Model 28, a prototype of which being ordered as the XP3Y-1. On 21 March 1935, the XP3Y-1 made its maiden flight; service trials commenced soon thereafter. It was rebuilt with more powerful engines and a new tail unit to become the XPBY-1. Production Catalinas were first delivered to the USN in October 1936; that same year, a first of several additional production orders was received. During the late 1930s, the type became a key element of the USN's long-distance logistics across the Pacific region. In 1939, production of the Catalina was restarted by Consolidated.

Throughout World War II, Catalinas were widely used across numerous theatres, including the North Atlantic, the South Atlantic, the Mediterranean Sea, the Philippines, the Dutch East Indies, Australia, and the Pacific Ocean. In one high-profile incident on 26 May 1941, an RAF Coastal Command Catalina located the German battleship Bismarck. On 10 December 1941, a U.S. Navy Catalina was credited with the first air-to-air "kill" of a Japanese aircraft. In June 1942, a Catalina patrol spotted the Japanese Combined Fleet approaching Midway Island, initiating the Battle of Midway. In the late 1940s, most of the flying boat models of the Catalina were withdrawn while the amphibian models would see longer service.

While considered to be obsolete during the Cold War, its role having been increasingly subsumed by a new generation of land-based aircraft, several operators elected to continue to make use of the type. In June 1952, a Swedish Air Force Catalina (Swedish designation "TP 47") was shot down by Soviet MiG 15 fighters over the Baltic Sea in what became known as the Catalina Affair. The last military-operated Catalina was withdrawn in the 1980s. Several ex-military Catalinas have been flown by civil operators, including for air racing.

== Design and development ==
=== Background ===
Development of the PBY Catalina can be traced back to the early 1930s, a time in which American dominance in the Pacific Ocean began to face competition from Imperial Japan. As part of its response to a potential conflict in this theatre, the United States Navy (USN) opted to invest considerable resources towards the development of long-range flying boats, which had the advantage of being able to land in any suitable waters. Naval doctrine of the 1930s and 1940s used flying boats in a wide variety of roles that today are handled by multiple special-purpose aircraft. In 1931, the service had procured both the Consolidated P2Y and Martin P3M to perform this role, however, both aircraft were relatively underpowered and hampered by inadequate range and limited payloads.

Accordingly, in October 1933, the USN contracted Consolidated, Martin, and Douglas to build competing prototypes to meet its needs for a new patrol bomber flying boat. These prototypes were designed to provide a relatively long operational range, which was intended to be used to locate and attack enemy transport ships across the sea to disrupt enemy supply lines. Both Consolidated and Douglas delivered single prototypes of their new designs, the XP3Y-1 and XP3D-1, respectively. The XP3Y-1 was an evolution of the company's earlier XPY-1 design, which had originally competed unsuccessfully for the P3M contract two years earlier and of the XP2Y design that the USN had authorized for a limited production run. Although the Douglas-built competitor proved to be a satisfactory design, the USN opted for Consolidated's proposal, largely due to its projected cost being only $90,000 per aircraft.

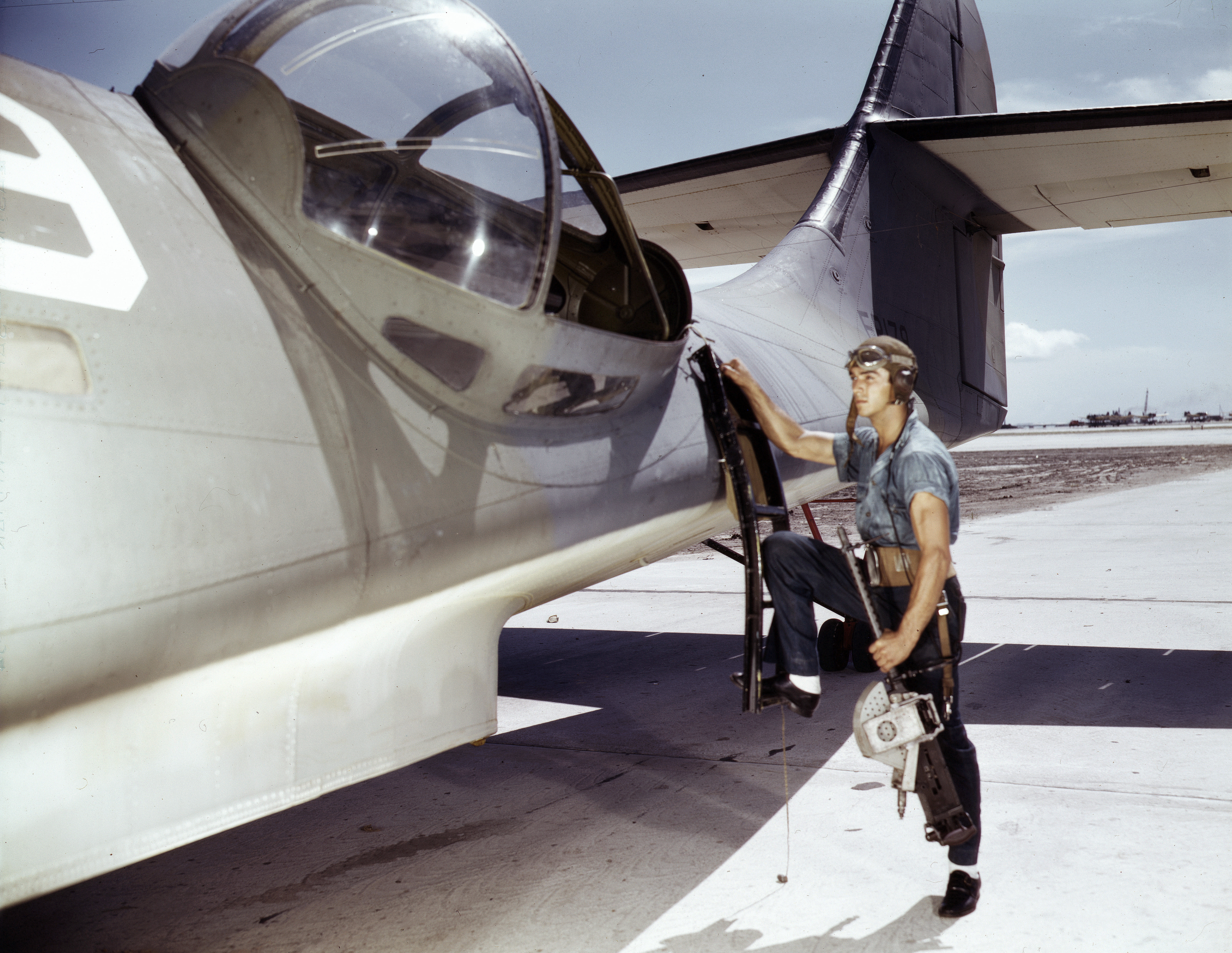
PBY waist gunner mounting port side gun blister (1942)

In terms of its general configuration, the XP3Y-1 (which received the internal designation of Model 28 from the company) featured a parasol wing with external bracing struts and mounted on a pylon over the fuselage. It was equipped with retractable stabilizing floats at its wingtip; when retracted in flight, these floats formed streamlined wingtips; Consolidated had licensed this feature from the British Saunders-Roe company. While its two-step hull design was broadly similar to that of the P2Y, the XP3Y-1 was provisioned with a cantilever cruciform tail unit in place of the earlier strut-braced twin tail arrangement. Furthermore, cleaner aerodynamics resulted in the XP3Y-1 possessing better performance to the firm's earlier designs. It featured all-metal construction and was covered by stressed-skin aluminum sheet, except for the ailerons and trailing edge of the wing, which were fabric covered instead.

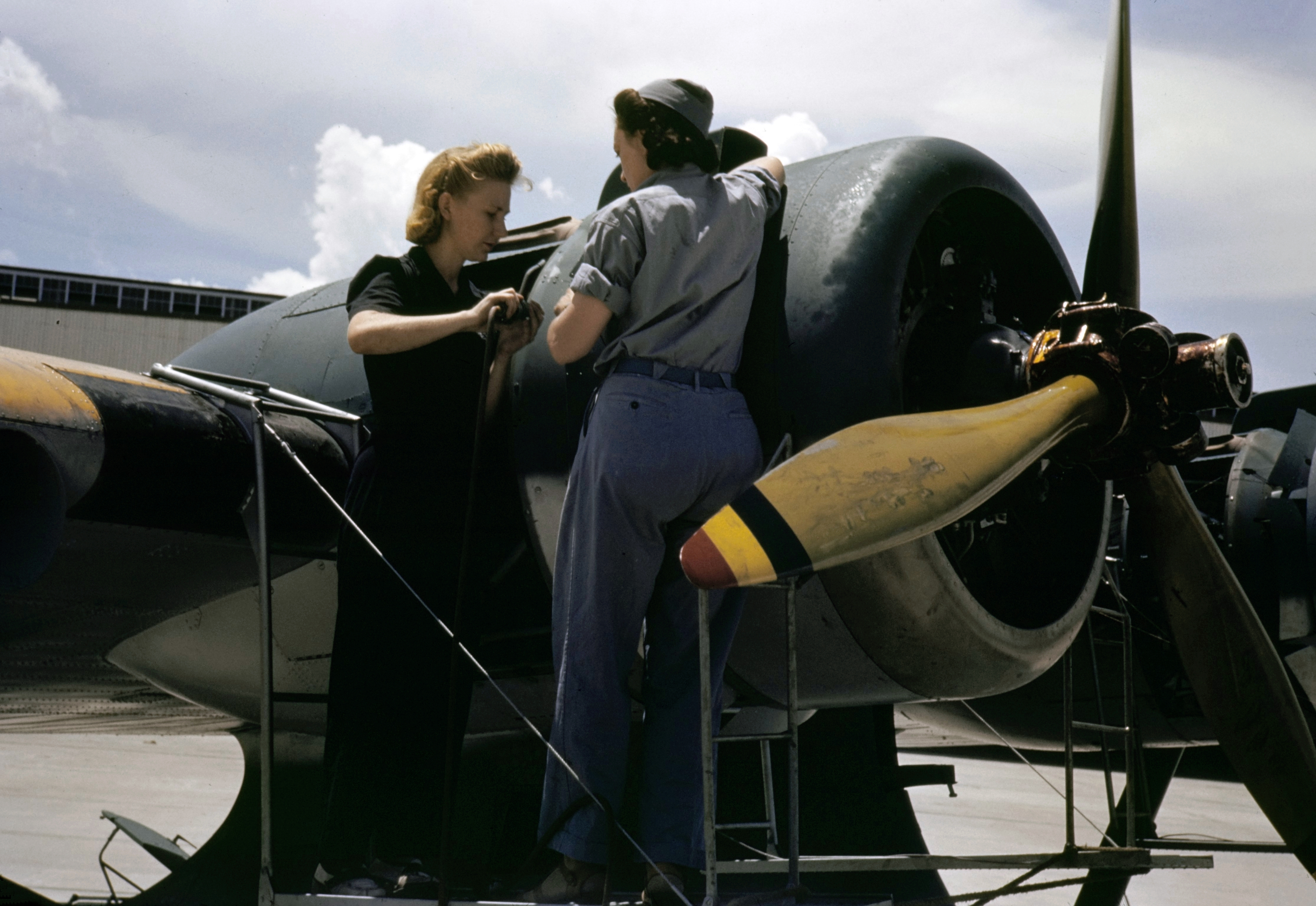
Two technicians servicing the Twin Wasp engine of a Catalina, August 1942

The XP3Y-1 was initially powered by a pair of 825 hp (615 kW) Pratt & Whitney R-1830-54 Twin Wasp radial engines mounted on the wing's leading edge. Armament comprised four .30 in (7.6 mm) Browning AN/M2 machine guns and up to 2,000 lb (910 kg) of bombs, the latter of which were carried underneath the wings. It was also provisioned with crew amenities, including a galley. Via the use of beaching gear, the type could be operated from both land and sea as required.

=== Into flight ===
On 21 March 1935, the XP3Y-1 conducted its maiden flight. Shortly thereafter, it was transferred to the USN for service trials. The XP3Y-1 demonstrated a significant performance improvement over previous patrol flying boats, leading to the service requesting further development to permit the prospective production aircraft to better perform the patrol bomber mission. Accordingly, in October 1935, the prototype was returned to Consolidated for modification, after which it was redesignated XPBY-1. Changes included the installation of 900 hp (670 kW) R-1830-64 engines and the implementation of redesigned vertical tail surfaces, which resolved a problem with the tail becoming submerged on takeoff, which had made lift-off impossible under some conditions. The XPBY-1 made its maiden flight on 19 May 1936, during which a record non-stop distance flight of 3,443 mi (2,992 nmi; 5,541 km) was achieved.

The XPBY-1 was delivered to VP-11F in October 1936. The second squadron to be equipped was VP-12, which received the first of its aircraft in early 1937. The second production order was placed on 25 July 1936. Over the next three years, the design was gradually developed further and successive models were introduced. In 1939, in spite of some assessors considering the type to be obsolete, Consolidated restarted the production line.

=== PBN Nomad ===
The Naval Aircraft Factory (NAF) performed significant modifications to the PBY design, many of which would have significantly interrupted deliveries had they been incorporated on the Consolidated production lines. The resulting aircraft, officially referred to as the PBN-1 Nomad, featured several key differences from the basic PBY. The most obvious upgrades were to the bow, which was sharpened and extended by two feet, and to the tail, which was enlarged and featured a new shape. Other improvements included larger fuel tanks to increase range by 50 percent and reinforced wings that permitting a 2,000 lb (908 kg) increase in gross takeoff weight. An auxiliary power unit was also installed, along with an improved electrical system, and the weapons were upgraded with continuous-feed mechanisms.

After the NAF transferred ownership via Project Zebra (1944–1945), 138 of the 156 PBN-1s produced served with the Soviet Navy. The remaining 18 were assigned to training units at NAS Whidbey Island and the Naval Air Facility in Newport, Rhode Island. Later, improvements found in the PBN, such as the larger tail, were incorporated into the amphibious PBY-6A.

=== Naming and designation ===
The aircraft eventually bore the name Catalina after Santa Catalina Island, California; the name was coined in November 1941, as the United Kingdom ordered their first 30 aircraft.

The designation "PBY" was determined in accordance with the U.S. Navy aircraft designation system of 1922; PB represented "Patrol Bomber" and Y was the code assigned to Consolidated Aircraft as its manufacturer. Catalinas built by other manufacturers for the U.S. Navy were designated according to different manufacturer codes, thus Canadian Vickers-built examples were designated PBV, Boeing Canada examples were PB2B (a Boeing PBB already existed), Consolidated Vultee examples were PB4 and NAF examples were PBN. In accordance with contemporary British naming practice of giving seaplanes service names after coastal port towns, Royal Canadian Air Force (RCAF) examples were named Canso, for the town of that name in Nova Scotia. The United States Army Air Forces and later the United States Air Force used the designation OA-10. U.S. Navy Catalinas used in the Pacific against the Japanese for night operations were painted black overall; as a result, these aircraft were sometimes referred to locally as "Black Cats".

=== Possible revival ===
In July 2023, a company called Catalina Aircraft, current holder of the type certificates for the Catalina, announced an intent to build the Next Generation Amphibious Aircraft (NGAA) Catalina II, a new aircraft on the basic design principles of the original Catalina, but using turboprop engines and other modern aviation tools. Deliveries were projected to commence by 2029. By 2026, the project was moving forward as the Catalina SPAR, being the overall aircraft title for multiple variants with separate names (e.g., Catalina Frigate for passenger/cargo, Catalina Kestrel for maritime patrol, and Catalina Condor for firefighting). In April 2026, the company was reportedly in the process of setting up a facility in Vero Beach, Florida to manufacture the Catalina II. Hong Kong-based company Pan American Airways System (PAAS) announced in July 2026 that they intend to order up to 46 Catalina II for luxury flights across Africa.

== Operational history ==
=== Pre-war activities ===
During the late 1930s, USN Catalinas started to semi-frequently fly non-stop between San Diego and Honolulu as well as between San Diego and Coco Solo, both routes being in excess of 2,500 miles. These flights, used to ferry personnel and equipment, reportedly carried in excess of 1,200 men prior to 1 January 1940.

=== Roles in World War II ===
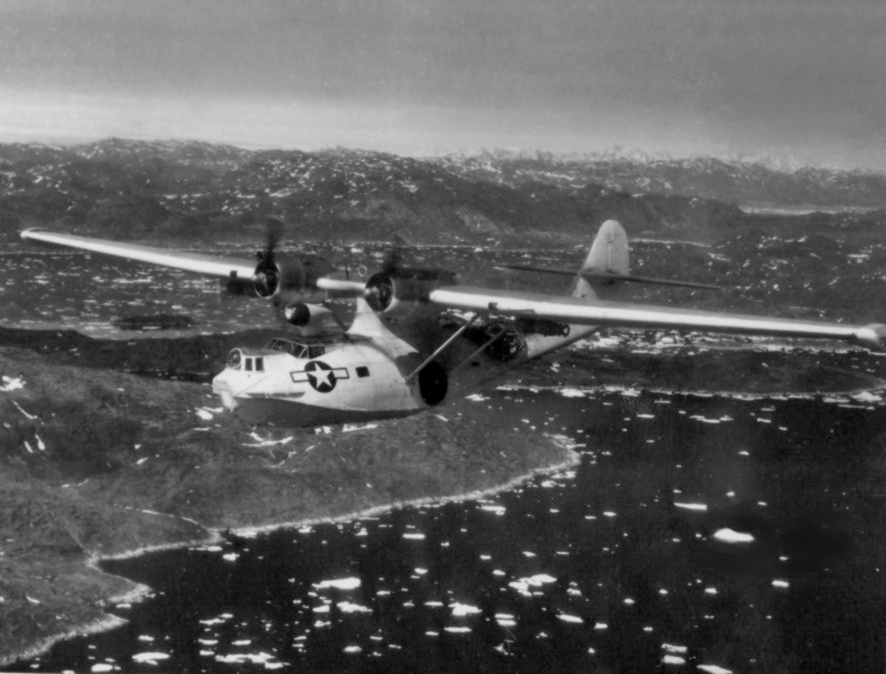
A radar-equipped PBY-5A from VP-6(CG) over Greenland, in 1945

The PBY was the most numerous aircraft of its kind in the conflict, with around 3,300 examples built. During World War II, PBYs were used in anti-submarine warfare, patrol bombing, convoy escort, search-and-rescue missions (especially air-sea rescue), and cargo transport. The type operated in nearly all operational theatres of World War II. The Catalina served with distinction and played a prominent and invaluable role in the war against Japan.

These patrol aircraft shared combat roles with land-based patrol bombers, while the long-range Consolidated LB-30 Liberator and the Consolidated Coronado were pressed into service to increase the all-important logistical strategic air-lift capability in the vast Pacific theater. The pairings allowed the Catalina to take on the role of eyes of the fleets at longer ranges than the floatplane scouts. Several different flying boats were adopted by the Navy, but the PBY was the most widely used and produced.

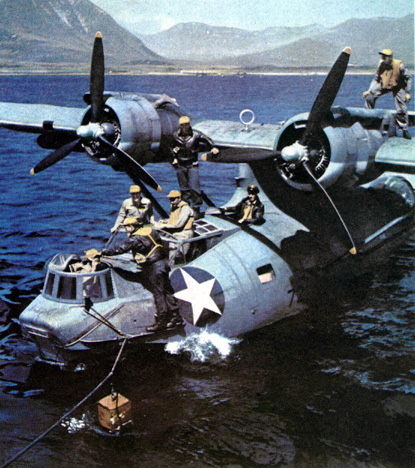
PBY riding at sea anchor

Although the Catalina was slow, Allied forces used the aircraft in a wide variety of roles for which it was never intended. PBYs are remembered for their rescue role, in which they saved the lives of hundreds of aircrew downed over water. Catalina airmen called their aircraft the "Cat" on combat missions and "Dumbo" in air-sea rescue service.

The Catalina scored the U.S. Navy's first credited air-to-air "kill" of a Japanese airplane in the Pacific War. On 10 December 1941, the Japanese attacked the Cavite Navy Yard in the Philippines, resulting in numerous U.S. ships and submarines being damaged or destroyed by bombs. While flying to safety during the raid on Cavite, Lieutenant Harmon T. Utter's PBY was attacked by three Japanese Mitsubishi A6M2 Zero carrier fighters; chief Boatswain Earl D. Payne, Utter's bow gunner, shot down one, thus scoring the U.S. Navy's first kill. Utter, as a commander, later co-ordinated the carrier air strikes that led to the destruction of the Japanese battleship Yamato.

The Catalina performed one of the first offensive operations against the Japanese by the U.S. On 27 December 1941, six Catalinas of Patrol Squadron 101 bombed Japanese shipping at Jolo Island against heavy fighter opposition, with four Catalinas lost.

==== Anti-submarine warfare ====
Catalinas were the most extensively used anti-submarine warfare (ASW) aircraft in both the Atlantic and Pacific theaters of World War II, and were also used in the Indian Ocean, flying from the Seychelles and from Ceylon. Their duties included escorting the Arctic convoys to Murmansk. Upon detecting an enemy submarine, Catalinas could deploy a combination of bombs and depth charges to attack the vessel.

By 1943, U-boats were well-armed with anti-aircraft guns and two Victoria Crosses were won by Catalina pilots pressing home their attacks on U-boats in the face of heavy fire: Flying Officer John Cruickshank of the RAF, in 1944, received the award for sinking what was believed to be U-347 (although now known to have been U-361) and in the same year, RCAF Flight Lieutenant David Hornell received the decoration posthumously for the sinking of U-1225. Their aircraft was damaged in the fight before it sank the U-boat, and Hornell (with two other crew) died from exposure. Catalinas destroyed 40 U-boats, but not without losses of their own. A Brazilian Catalina attacked and sank U-199 in Brazilian waters on 31 July 1943; subsequently, this aircraft was baptized as Arará, in memory of the merchant ship of that name, which had been sunk by another U-boat.

In addition to its use against the U-boat threat, the Catalina also engaged both Italian and Japanese submarines on occasion.

==== Maritime patrol ====
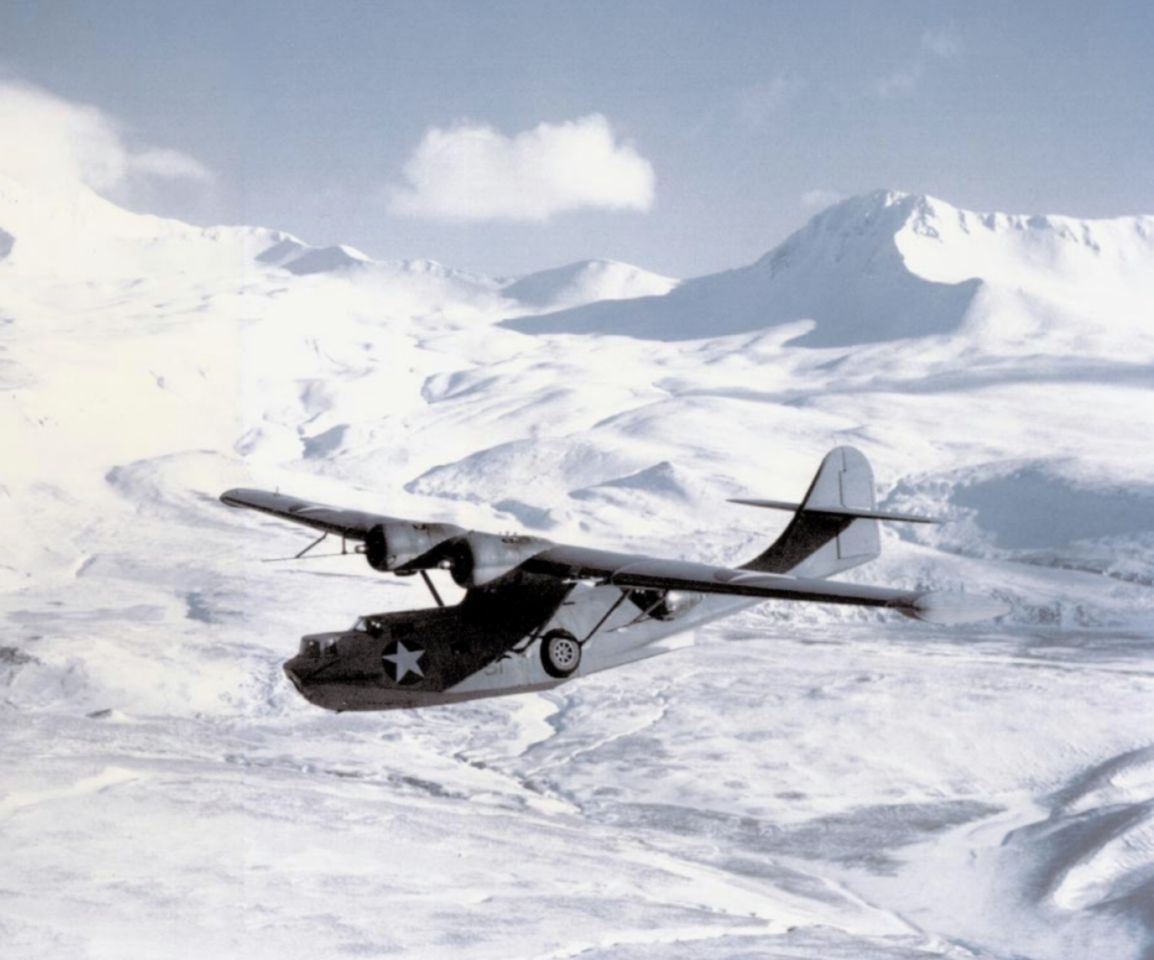
PBY-5A of VP-61 over the Aleutian Islands, 1943

In their role as patrol aircraft, Catalinas participated in some of the most notable naval engagements of World War II. The aircraft's parasol wing and large waist blisters provided excellent visibility, and combined with its long range and endurance, often made it well suited for the task.

An RAF Coastal Command Catalina flying from Castle Archdale Flying boat base, Lower Lough Erne, Northern Ireland, located the German battleship Bismarck on 26 May 1941, some 690 nmi (1,280 km; 790 mi) northwest of Brest. Bismarck was attempting to evade the Royal Navy and join up with other Kriegsmarine forces in Brest. While the Bismark's anti-aircraft guns were able to score several direct hits on the Catalina, these did not deal critical damage, and the crew were able to stay aloft while using its onboard radio set to communicate with other British assets. Accordingly, this sighting directly contributed to the destruction of the German battleship.

On 7 December 1941, before the Japanese amphibious landings on Kota Bharu, Malaya, their invasion force was approached by a Catalina flying boat of No. 205 Squadron RAF. The aircraft was shot down by five Nakajima Ki-27 fighters before it could radio its report to air headquarters in Singapore. Flying Officer Patrick Bedell, commanding the Catalina, and his seven crew members became the first Allied casualties in the war with Japan. Patrol Wing 10 of the U.S. Asiatic Fleet had 44 Catalinas under its command, but lost 41 within 90 days. Patrol Wing 10 also lost its main seaplane tender, USS Langley, to Japanese aircraft during the Dutch East Indies Campaign, while she was transporting 32 Curtiss P-40 Warhawk fighter planes.

In June 1942, a routine patrol spotted the Japanese Combined Fleet approaching Midway Island. The patrolling Catalinas were able to circle the fleet three times without being detected while signalling to alert the nearby USN fleet, beginning the Battle of Midway. Directly after the end of the battle, the type also spent the following four days patrolled the seas to spot downed pilots, resulting the rescue of 27 airmen.

Catalinas also provided useful reconnaissance during the Aleutian Islands campaign in mid-1943, being the first assets to spot the Japanese fleet and routinely reporting on its position.

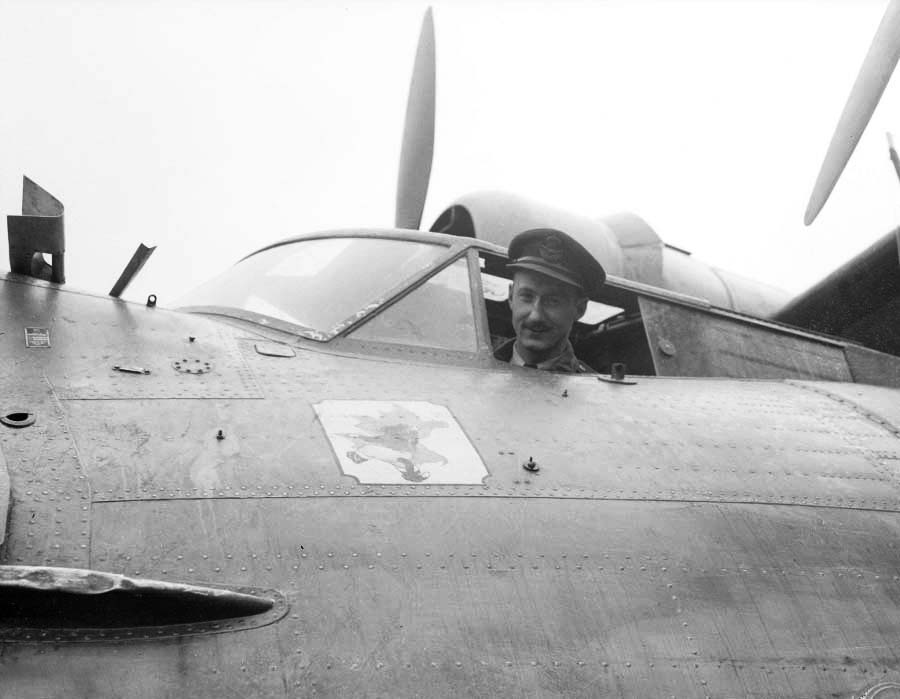
Squadron Leader Leonard Birchall aboard a Consolidated Catalina before being shot down and captured by the Japanese near Ceylon

A RCAF Canso flown by Squadron Leader L.J. Birchall foiled Japanese plans to destroy the Royal Navy's Indian Ocean fleet on 4 April 1942, when it detected the Japanese carrier fleet approaching Ceylon.

==== Night attack and naval interdiction ====
During the Battle of Midway, four U.S. Navy PBYs of Patrol Squadrons 24 and 51 made a night torpedo attack on the Japanese fleet on the night of 3–4 June 1942, scoring one hit, which damaged the fleet oiler Akebono Maru, the only successful American torpedo attack in the entire battle.

During the Guadalcanal campaign, some U.S. Navy PBYs were painted matte black and sent on night bombing, torpedoing, and strafing missions against Japanese supply vessels and warships, including conducting interdiction raids on the Tokyo Express. These PBYs were later called "Black Cats". Subsequently, special squadrons of Black Cats were formed, commencing in December 1942 with VP-12, with an additional 13 squadrons coming into service thereafter. (Note: Black Cat squadrons included then designated as VP-11, VP-12, VP-23, VP-24, VP-33, VP-34, VP-44, VP-52, VP-53, VP-54, VP-71, VP-81, VP-91, and VP-101.) Flying slowly at night, dipping to ship-mast height, the Black Cats bombed, strafed, and torpedoed all kinds of Japanese vessels, sinking or damaging thousands of tons of shipping. The Black Cats also performed bombing, strafing, and harassment regarding land-based Japanese installations, as well as conducting reconnaissance and search and rescue operations. The Black Cat squadrons continued to be active into 1944, with the PB4Y-2 beginning to come in service in greater numbers and replacing the PBYs, the last Black Cat squadrons returning to the U.S. in early 1945.

The Royal Australian Air Force (RAAF) also operated Catalinas as night raiders, with four squadrons Nos. 11, 20, 42, and 43 laying mines from 23 April 1943 until July 1945 in the southwest Pacific deep in Japanese-held waters, bottling up ports and shipping routes and forcing ships into deeper waters to become targets for U.S. submarines; they tied up the major strategic ports such as Balikpapan, which shipped 80% of Japanese oil supplies. In late 1944, their mining missions sometimes exceeded 20 hours in duration and were carried out from as low as 200 ft (61 m) in the dark. Operations included trapping the Japanese fleet in Manila Bay in assistance of General Douglas MacArthur's landing at Mindoro in the Philippines. RAAF Catalinas also operated out of Jinamoc in the Leyte Gulf, and mined ports on the Chinese coast from Hong Kong to as far north as Wenzhou. Both USN and RAAF Catalinas regularly mounted nuisance night-bombing raids on Japanese bases, with the RAAF claiming the slogan "The First and the Furthest". Targets of these raids included a major base at Rabaul. RAAF aircrews, like their U.S. Navy counterparts, employed "terror bombs", ranging from scrap metal and rocks to empty beer bottles with razor blades inserted into the necks, to produce high-pitched screams as they fell, keeping Japanese soldiers awake and scrambling for cover. A Catalina base was on Drimmie Head on the Gove Peninsula in the Northern Territory.

==== Search and rescue ====
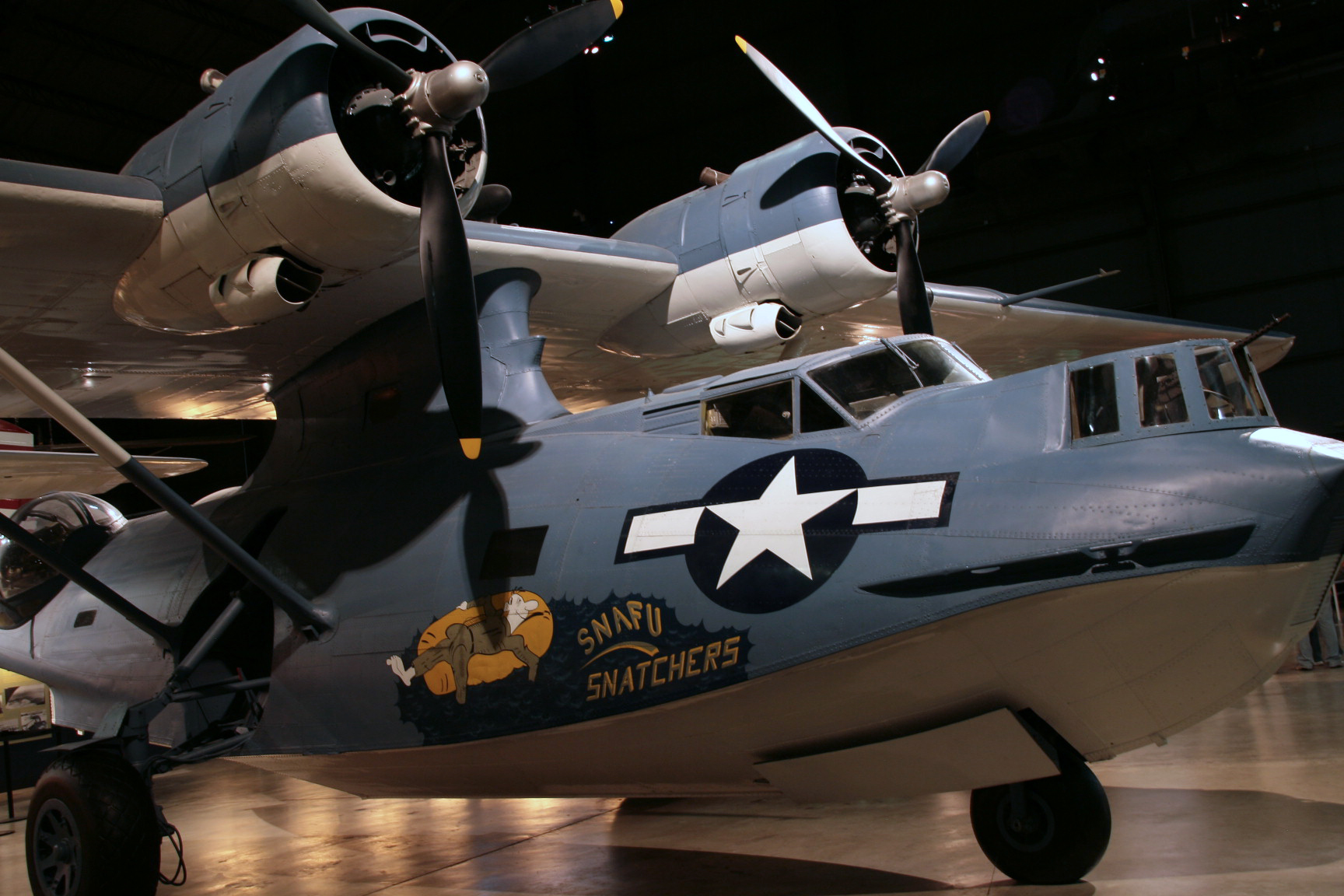
Search and Rescue OA-10 at the National Museum of the United States Air Force

Catalinas were employed by every branch of the U.S. military as rescue aircraft. A PBY piloted by LCDR Adrian Marks (USN) rescued 56 sailors in high seas from the heavy cruiser Indianapolis after the ship was sunk during World War II. With no more room inside, the crew tied sailors to the wings. The aircraft could not fly in this state; instead, it acted as a lifeboat, protecting the sailors from exposure and the risk of shark attack, until rescue ships arrived. Catalinas continued to function in the search-and-rescue role for decades after the end of the conflict.

==== Early commercial use ====
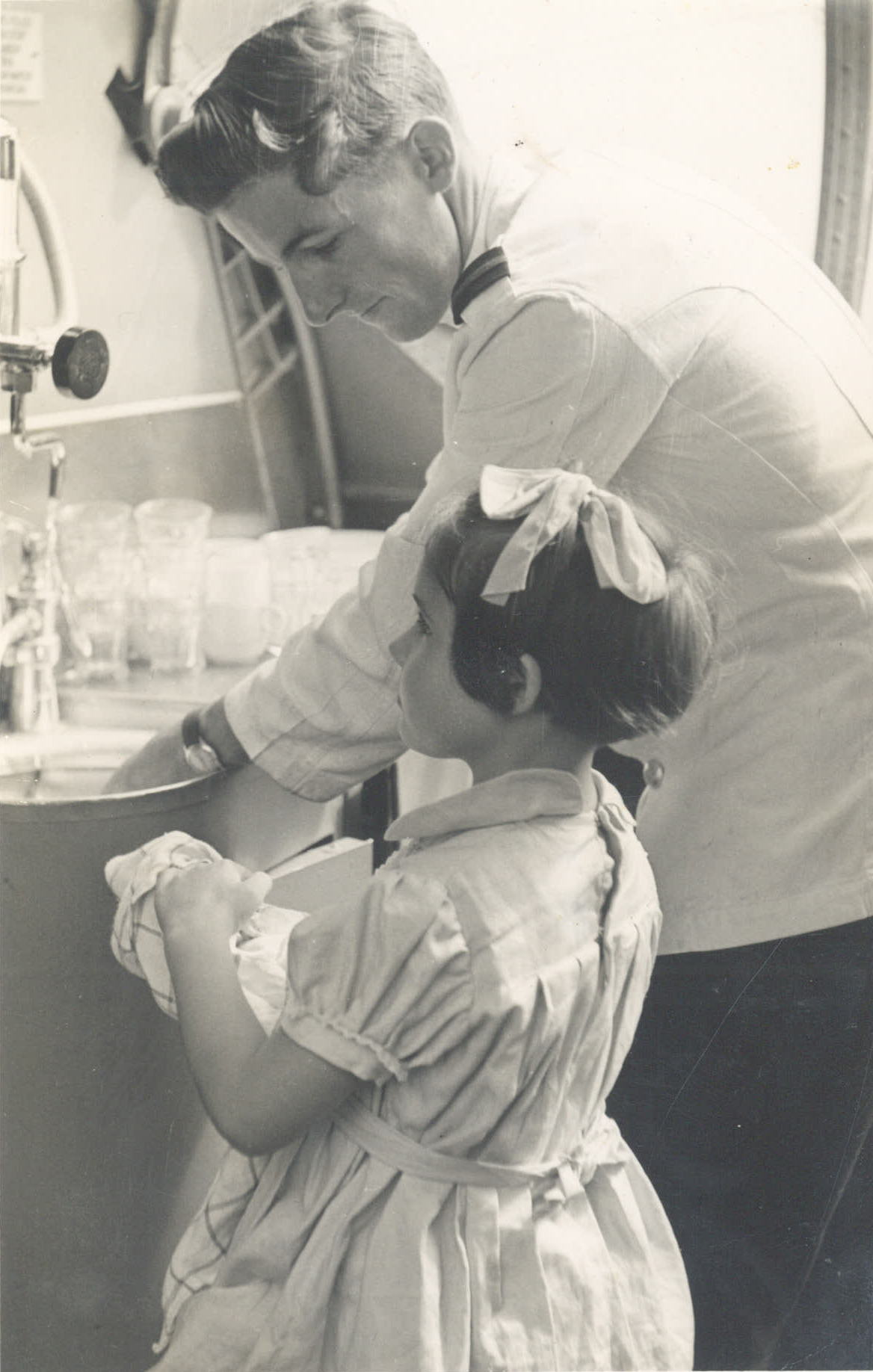
Flight steward Max White at work on board a commercial Qantas Empire Airways Catalina aircraft en route from Suva to Sydney in January 1949

Catalinas were also used for commercial air travel. For example, Qantas Empire Airways flew commercial passengers from Suva, Fiji, to Sydney, a journey of 2,060 miles (3,320 km), which in 1949 took two days. The longest commercial flights (in terms of time aloft) ever made in aviation history were the Qantas flights flown weekly from 29 June 1943 through July 1945 over the Indian Ocean, dubbed the Double Sunrise. Qantas offered nonstop service between Perth and Colombo, a distance of 3,592 nmi (4,134 mi; 6,652 km). As the Catalina typically cruised at 110 kn (130 mph; 200 km/h), this took 28 to 32 hours and was called the "flight of the double sunrise", since the passengers saw two sunrises during their nonstop journey. The flight was made in radio silence because of the possibility of Japanese attack and had a maximum payload of 1,000 lb (450 kg) or three passengers plus 143 lb (65 kg) of military and diplomatic mail.

=== Post-World War II employment ===
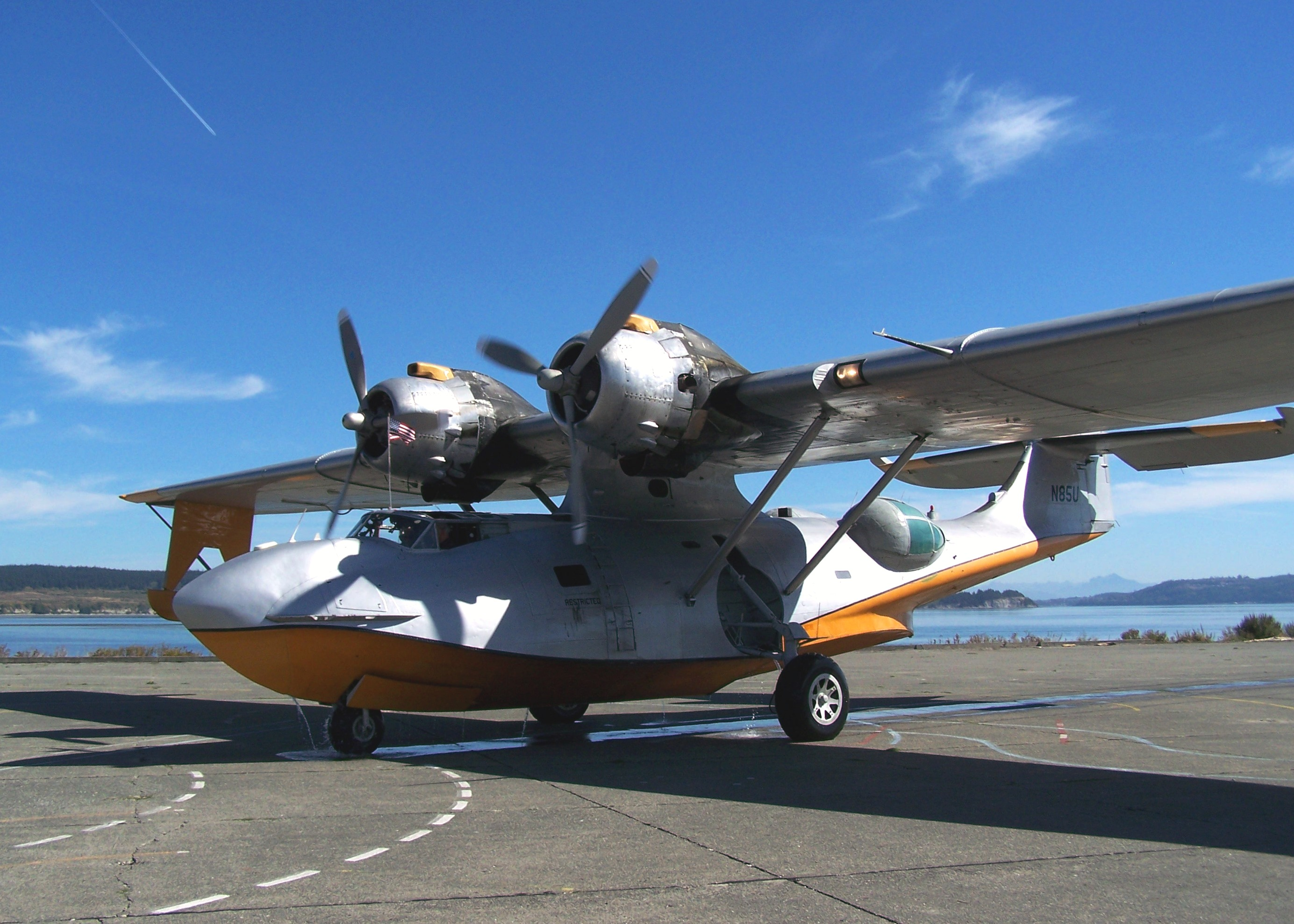
Civilian Catalina, modified for aerial firefighting, arrives at the Seaplane Base, NAS Whidbey Island, Oak Harbor, Washington, 18 September 2009

An Australian PBY named Frigate Bird II, an ex-RAAF aircraft, registered VH-ASA, made the first trans-Pacific flight across the South Pacific between Australia and Chile in 1951 by Sir Gordon Taylor, making numerous stops at islands along the way for refueling, meals, and overnight sleep of its crew, flown from Sydney to Quintero in Chile after making initial landfall at Valparaiso via Tahiti and Easter Island. One of six ordered by the RAAF was used as part of the air route across the Pacific from Sydney to Valparaiso, is in the collection of the Museum of Applied Arts and Sciences in Sydney.

With the end of the conflict, all of the flying boat versions of the Catalina were quickly retired from the U.S. Navy, but the amphibious versions remained in service for some years. The last Catalina in U.S. service was a PBY-6A operating with a Naval Reserve squadron, which was retired from use on 3 January 1957. The Catalina subsequently equipped the world's smaller armed services into the late 1960s in fairly substantial numbers.

The U.S. Air Force's Strategic Air Command used Catalinas (designated OA-10s) in service as scout aircraft in 1946 and 1947.

The Brazilian Air Force flew Catalinas in naval air-patrol missions against German submarines starting in 1943. The flying boats also carried out air-mail deliveries. In 1948, a transport squadron was formed and equipped with PBY-5As converted to the role of amphibious transports. The 1st Air Transport Squadron (ETA-1) was based in the port city of Belem and flew Catalinas and C-47s until 1982. Catalinas were convenient for supplying military detachments scattered along the Amazon. They reached places that were otherwise accessible only by helicopters. The ETA-1 insignia was a winged turtle with the motto, "Though slowly, I always get there". Today, the last Brazilian Catalina (a former RCAF one) is displayed at the Airspace Museum in Rio de Janeiro.

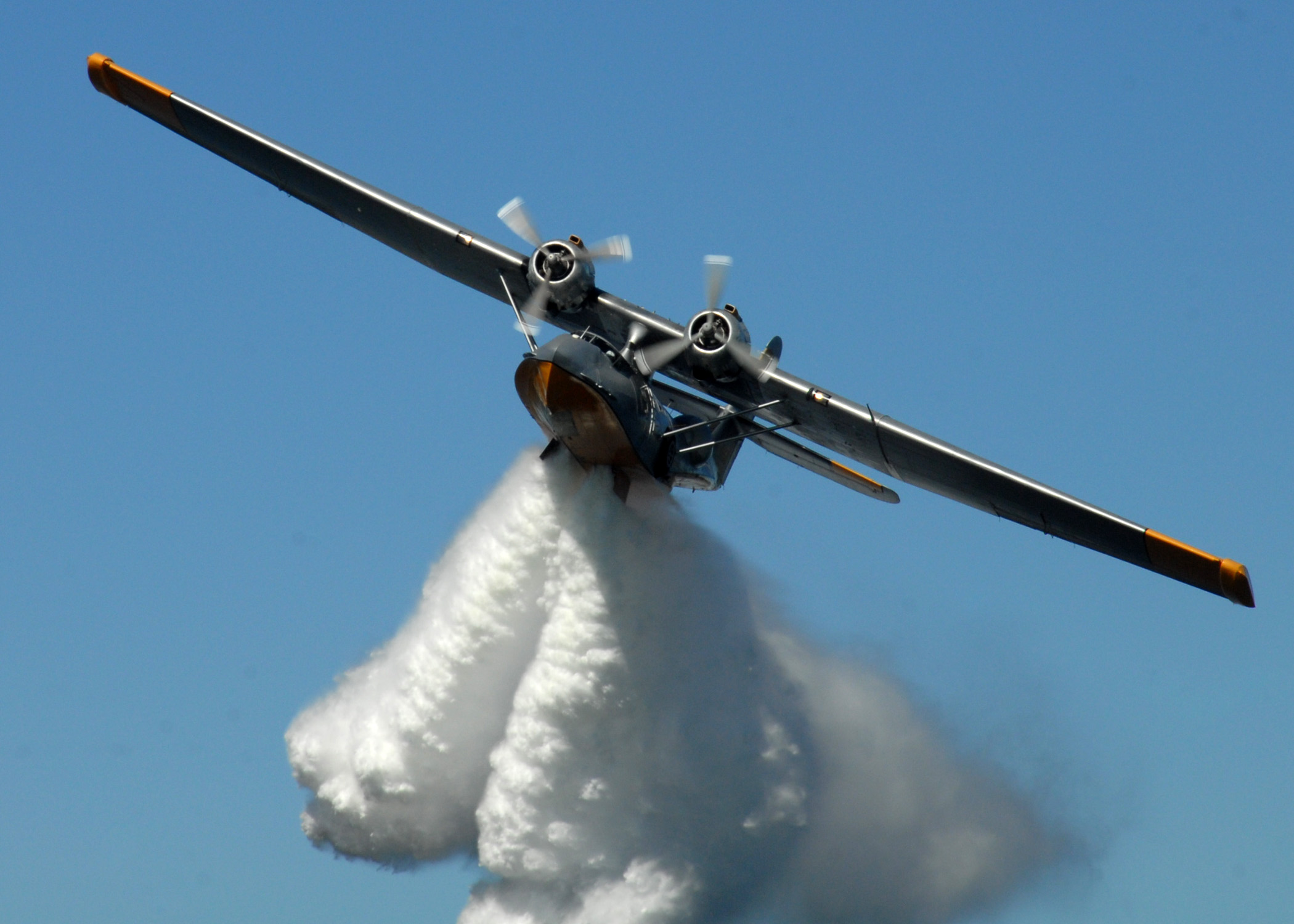
A PBY-6A Catalina drops a load of water from its bomb bay.

Oceanographer Jacques-Yves Cousteau used a PBY-6A (N101CS) to support his diving expeditions. His second son, Philippe, was killed in an accident in this aircraft that occurred on the Tagus River near Lisbon. The Catalina nosed over during a high-speed taxi run undertaken to check the hull for leakage following a water landing, which caused the aircraft to turn upside down and break up aft of the cockpit.

Air-race champion, stunt pilot, and airline operator Paul Mantz converted an unknown number of surplus Catalinas to flying yachts at his Orange County California hangar in the late 1940s and early 1950s.

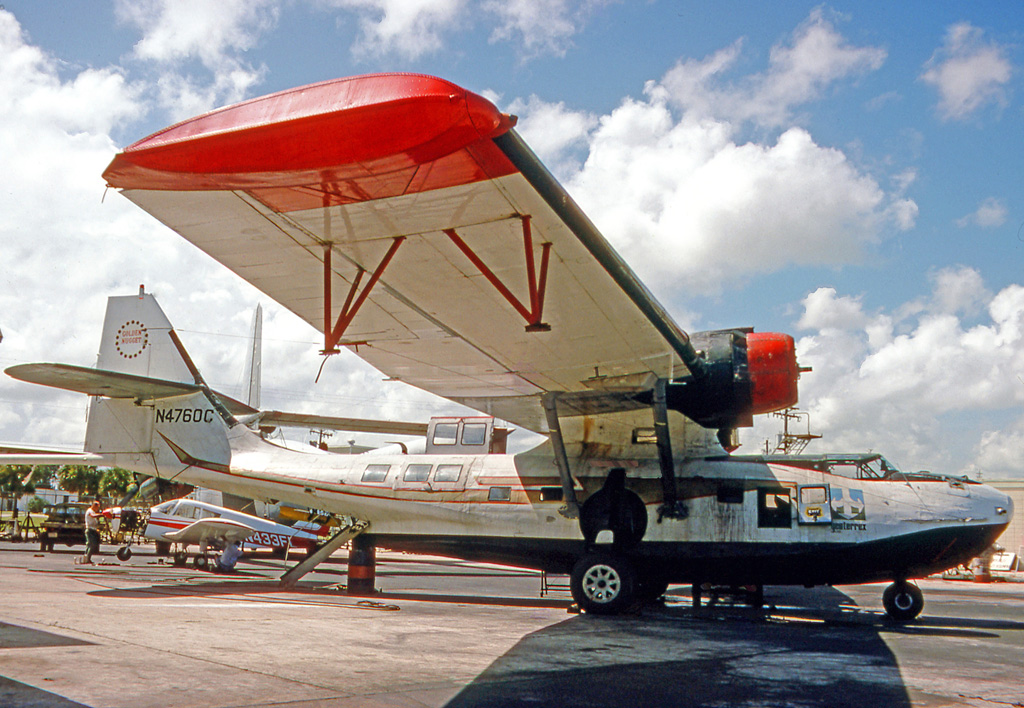
An OA-10A was converted by Steward-Davis Inc to their Super Cat standard. It is additionally fitted out for survey work for Geoterrex Inc

Steward-Davis converted several Catalinas to their Super Catalina standard (later known as Super Cat), which replaced the usual 1,200 hp (890 kW) Pratt & Whitney R-1830 Twin Wasp engines with Wright R-2600 Cyclone 14 engines of 1,700 hp (1,300 kW). A larger, squared-off rudder was installed to compensate for the increased yaw, which the more powerful engines could generate. The Super Catalina also had extra cabin windows and other alterations.

China Airlines, the official airline of the Republic of China (Taiwan), was founded with two Catalina amphibians.

=== Catalina affair ===
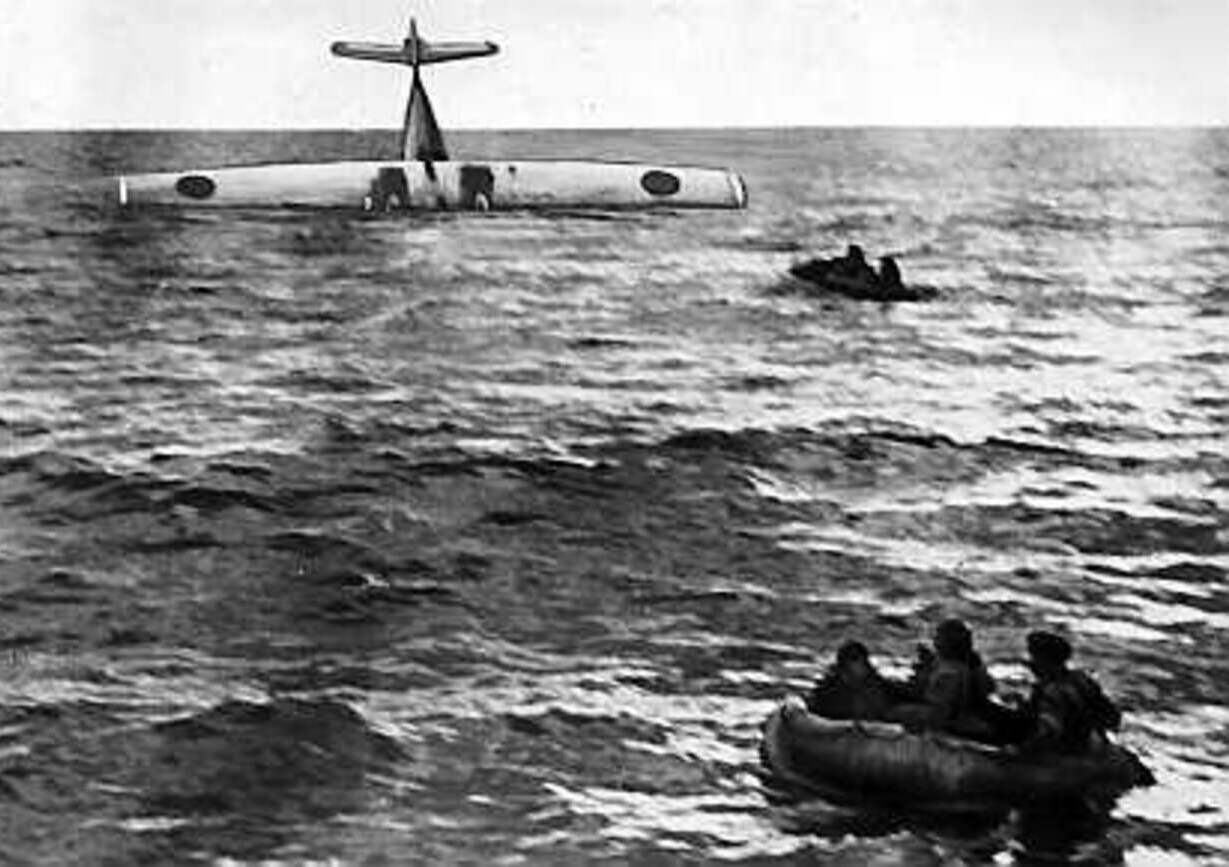
Swedish Catalina after being shot down by Soviet MiG-15 fighters in June 1952: The air crew was saved by a nearby ship.

The Catalina Affair is the name given to a Cold War incident in which a Swedish Air Force search-and-rescue/maritime patrol Catalina (Swedish designation "TP 47") was shot down by Soviet MiG 15 fighters over the Baltic Sea in June 1952 while investigating the disappearance of a Swedish Douglas DC-3 (later found to have been shot down by Soviet MiG-15s while on a signals intelligence mission; it was found in 2003 and raised 2004–2005).

== Variants ==
An estimated 4,051 Catalinas, Cansos, and GSTs of all versions were produced between June 1937 and May 1945 for the U.S. Navy, the United States Army Air Forces, the United States Coast Guard, Allied nations, and civilian customers.

Flying boats

Model 28
XP3Y-1 prototype
Model 28-1
PBY-1
Model 28-2
PBY-2
Model 28-3
PBY-3
Model 28-4
PBY-4
Model 28-5
PBY-5
Model 28-5MA
PBY-5 (MA = Market, Australia) for the Royal Australian Air Force
Model 28-5MC
PBY-5 (MC = Market, Canada) for the Royal Canadian Air Force
Model 28-5ME
PBY-5 (ME = Market, England) for the Royal Air Force
Model 28-5MN
PBY-5 (MN = Market, Netherlands) for the Royal Netherlands Fleet Air Arm
Model 28-6
PBY-6

Amphibians

Model 28-5A
PBY-5A (A = Amphibious)
Model 28-5AMC
PBY-5A (AMC = Amphibious, Market, Canada) for the Royal Canadian Air Force
Model 28-5AMN
PBY-5A (AMN = Amphibious, Market, Netherlands) for the Royal Netherlands Fleet Air Arm
Model 28-6A
PBY-6A (A = Amphibious)

=== US Navy ===
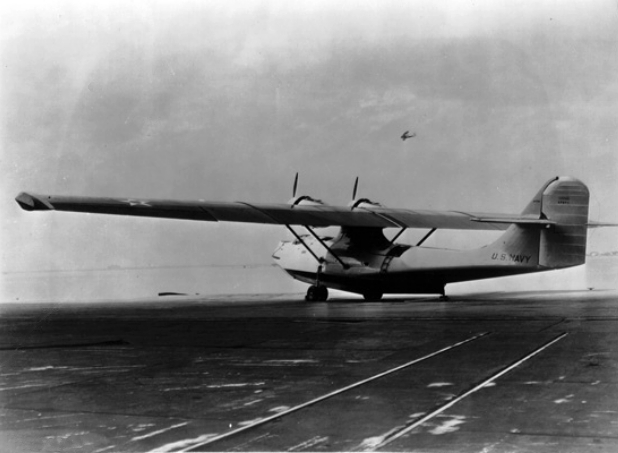
Prototype Model 28 XP3Y-1 flying boat, later modified and redesignated XPBY-1

XP3Y-1
Prototype Model 28 flying boat for the U.S. Navy, with two 825 hp (615 kW) Pratt & Whitney R-1830-54 Twin Wasp engines, later modified and redesignated XPBY-1, one built (USN Bureau No. 9459).
XPBY-1
The Model 28 XP3Y-1 prototype modified and redesignated for the United States Navy's "patrol bomber" role, re-engined with two 900 hp (670 kW) R-1830-64 engines, one built. Later fitted with a 48 feet (15 m) diameter ring to detonate magnetic sea mines. A 550 hp (410 kW) Ranger engine drove a generator to produce the magnetic field.
PBY-1
Initial production variant with two 900 hp (670 kW) R-1830-64 engines, 60 built.
PBY-2
Equipment changes and improved performance, 50 built.
PBY-3
Powered by two 1,000 hp (750 kW) R-1830-66 engines, 66 built.
PBY-4
Powered by two 1,050 hp (780 kW) R-1830-72 engines, 33 built (including one initial as a XPBY-4, which later became the XPBY-5A)
PBY-5 (Model 28-5)
Either two 1,200 hp (890 kW) R-1830-82 or −92 engines and provision for extra fuel tanks (with partial self-sealing protection). 683 built (plus one built at New Orleans), some aircraft to the RAF as the Catalina IVA and one to the United States Coast Guard. The PBY-5 was also built in the Soviet Union as the GST.
XPBY-5A
One PBY-4 converted into an amphibian and first flown in November 1939.

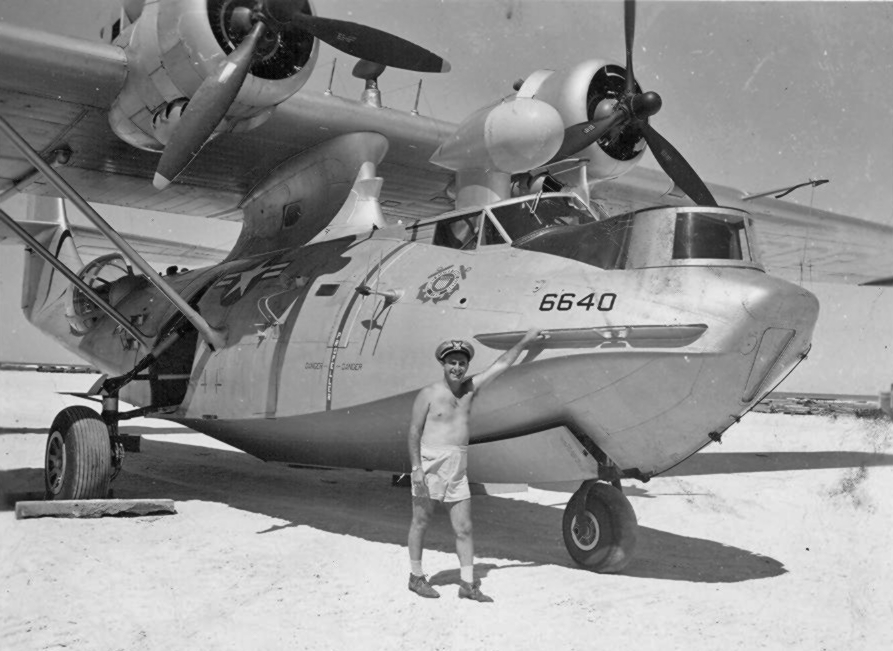
A United States Coast Guard PBY-5A at Tern Island in the northwestern Hawaiian archipelago in 1953

PBY-5A
Amphibious version of the PBY-5 with two 1,200 hp (890 kW) R-1830-92 engines, first batch (of 124) had one 0.3 in (7.6 mm) bow gun, the remainder had two bow guns; 803 built including diversions to the United States Army Air Forces, the RAF (as the Catalina IIIA) and one to the United States Coast Guard
PBY-5R
The XPBY-5A converted into a staff transport, with amphibious gear and nose turret removed and additional windows added.

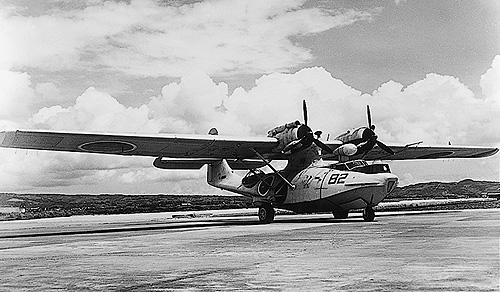
Japan Maritime Self-Defense Force PBY-6A

PBY-6A
Amphibious version with two 1,200 hp (890 kW) R-1830-92 engines and a taller fin and rudder. Radar scanner fitted above cockpit and two 0.3 in (7.6 mm) bow guns; 175 built including 21 transferred to the Soviet Navy
PBY-6AG
One PBY-6A used by the United States Coast Guard as a staff transport
PB2B-1
Boeing Canada built PBY-5 flying boat for the RAF and RCAF from 1942, 240 built
PB2B-1A
Boeing Canada built PBY-5A amphibious aircraft for the RCAF from 1943. 55 built.
PB2B-2
Boeing Canada version of the PBY-5 but with the taller PBN-1 fin, 67 built, most to the RAF as the Catalina VI
PB4-54
Consolidated Vultee version of the PBY-5A
PBN-1 Nomad
Naval Aircraft Factory version of the PBY-5 with major modification including a 2 ft (0.61 m) bow extension, modified hull lines and step, re-designed tip floats and tail surfaces and a revised electrical system. 155 were built for delivery to the RAF as the Catalina V although 138 were Lend-Leased to the Soviet Navy as the KM-1

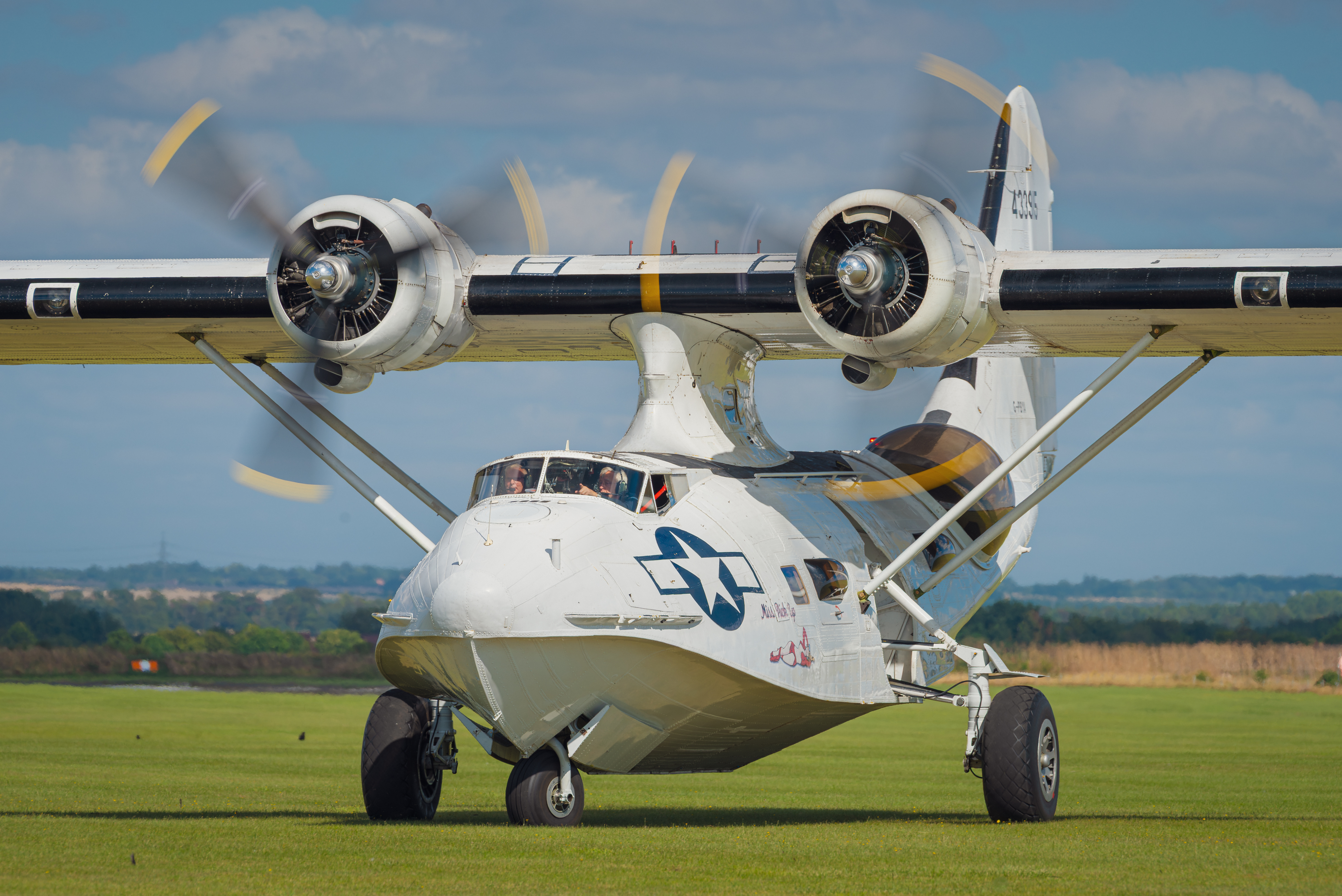
Canadian Vickers PBV-1A Canso (Catalina) "Miss Pick Up"

PBV-1A
Canadian Vickers built version of the PBY-5A, 380 built including 150 to the RCAF as the Canso "A" and the rest to the USAAF as the OA-10A.

=== United States Army Air Forces ===
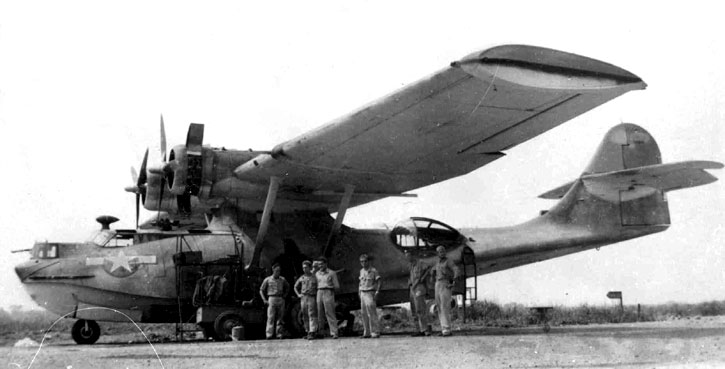
USAAF OA-10 with crew

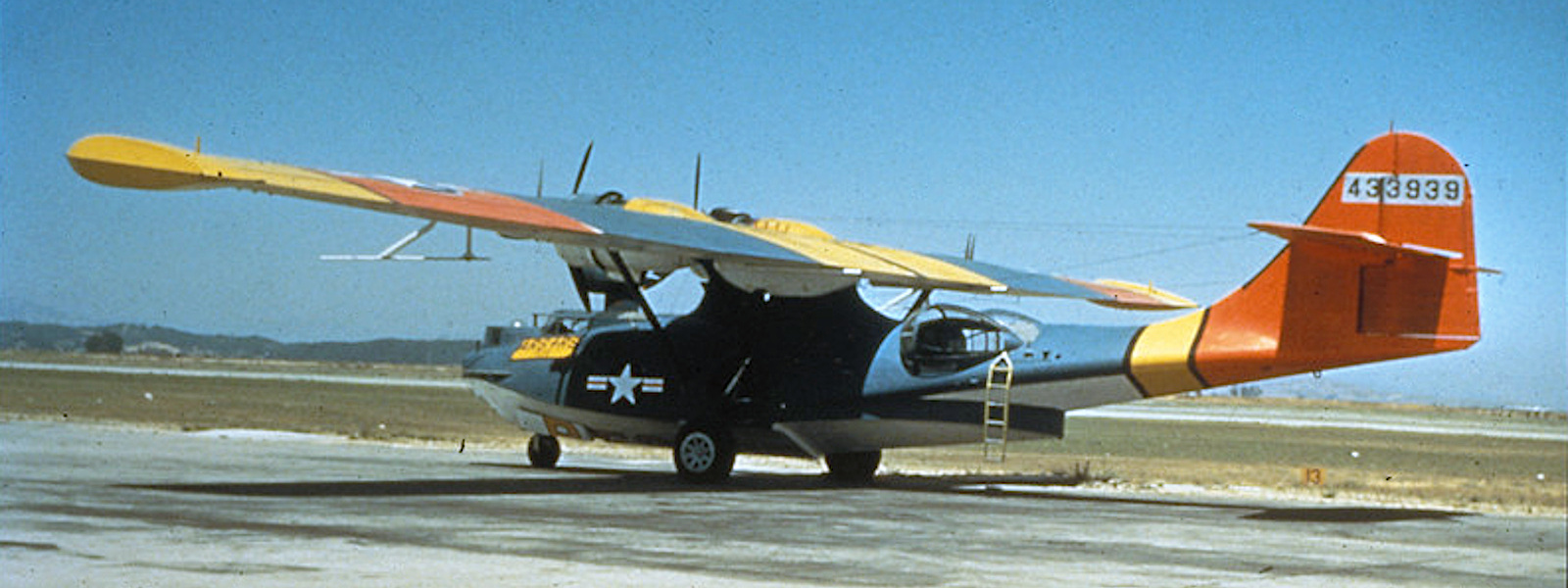
SA-10A, USAF 4th Rescue Group, Hamilton AFB, California, 1952. Sold in 1958 to Cuban Air Force as 191

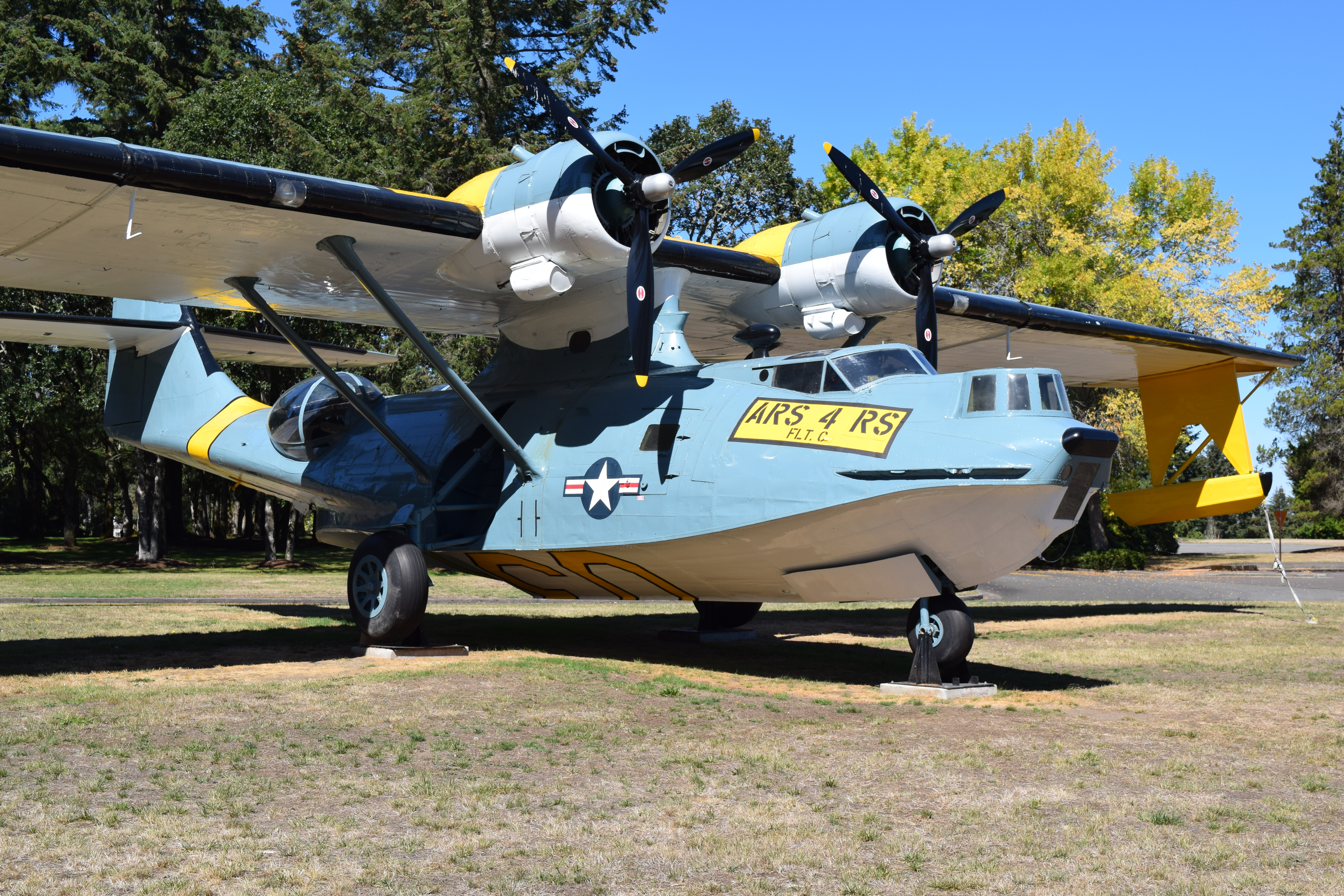
SA-10A painted to resemble an OA-10A

OA-10
USAAF designation for the PBY-5A (OA = observation/amphibian). 105 built (56 transferred from the US Navy). 58 surviving aircraft were redesignated to A-10 on 11 June 1948 (A = amphibian). Search and rescue versions were designated SA-10 (SA = search/amphibian).
OA-10A
USAAF designation for the PBV-1A. 230 transferred from the US Navy. Surviving aircraft were redesignated to A-10A on 11 June 1948. Search and rescue versions were designated SA-10A. Three additional aircraft were transferred from the US Navy in 1949 as SA-10As.
OA-10B
USAAF designation for the PBY-6A. 75 transferred from the US Navy. Surviving aircraft were redesignated to A-10B on 11 June 1948. Search and rescue versions were designated SA-10B.

=== Royal Air Force ===
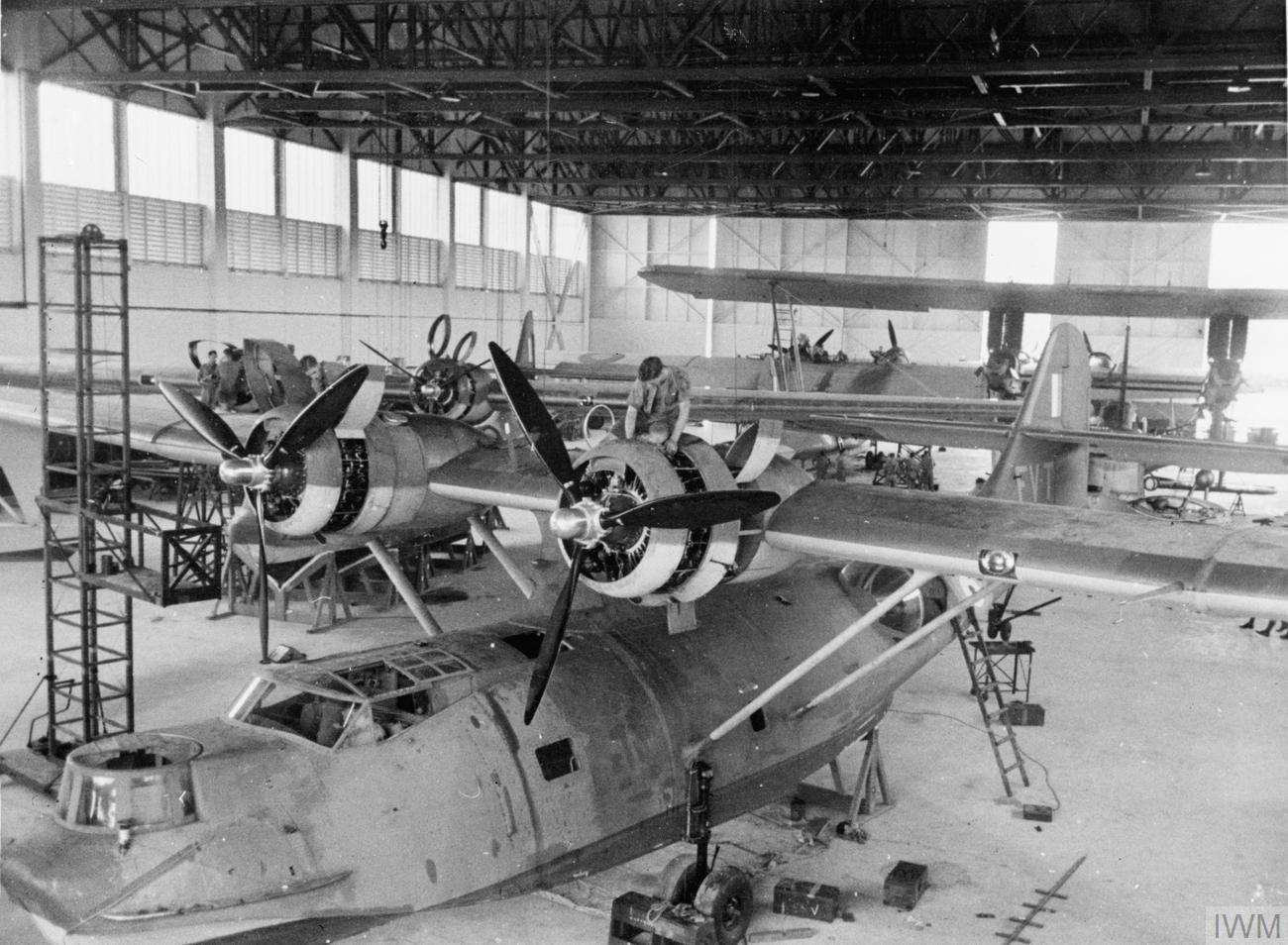
No. 205 Squadron RAF Catalina Is being serviced at RAF Seletar, Singapore

Catalina Mk. I
Direct purchase aircraft for the Royal Air Force, same as the PBY-5 with six 0.303 in (7.7 mm) guns (one in bow, four in waist blisters and one aft of the hull step) and powered by two 1,200 hp (890 kW) R-1830-S1C3-G engines, 109 built.
Catalina Mk. IA
Operated by the Royal Canadian Air Force as the Canso, 14 built.
Catalina Mk. IB
Lend-lease PBY-5Bs for the RAF, 225 aircraft built.
Catalina Mk. II
Equipment changes, six built.
Catalina Mk. IIA
Vickers-Canada built Catalina II for the RAF, 50 built.
Catalina Mk. IIB
PBY-5B for Canada, 8 built.
Catalina Mk. IIIA
Former U.S. Navy PBY-5As used by the RAF on the North Atlantic Ferry Service, 12 aircraft. These were the only amphibians that saw RAF service.
Catalina Mk. IVA
Lend-lease PBY-5s for the RAF, 93 aircraft.

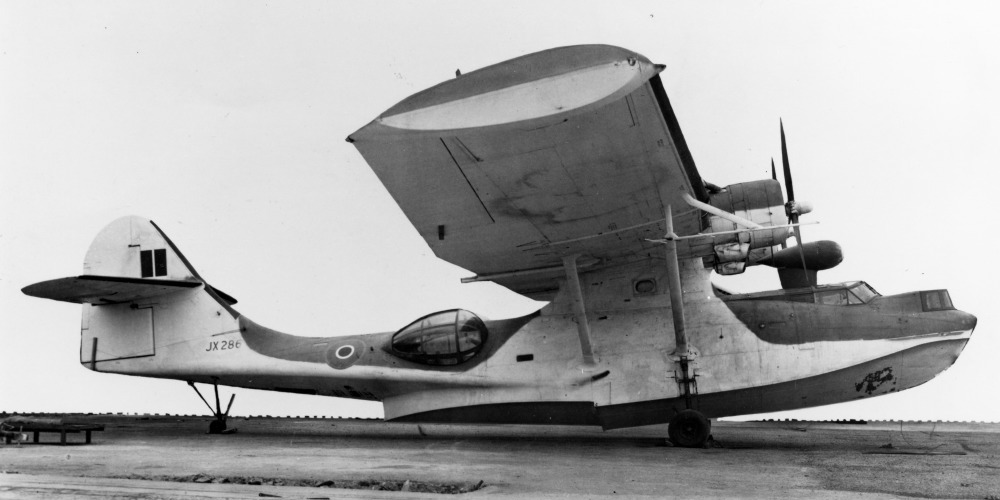
Boeing Canada built PB2B-1 in Canadian service as a Catalina IVB

Catalina Mk. IVB
Lend-lease PB2B-1s for the RAF, some to the Royal Australian Air Force.
Catalina Mk. V
PBN-1 orders for the RAF, cancelled.
Catalina Mk. VI
Lend-lease PB2B-2s for the RAF, some to the RAAF.

=== Royal Canadian Air Force ===
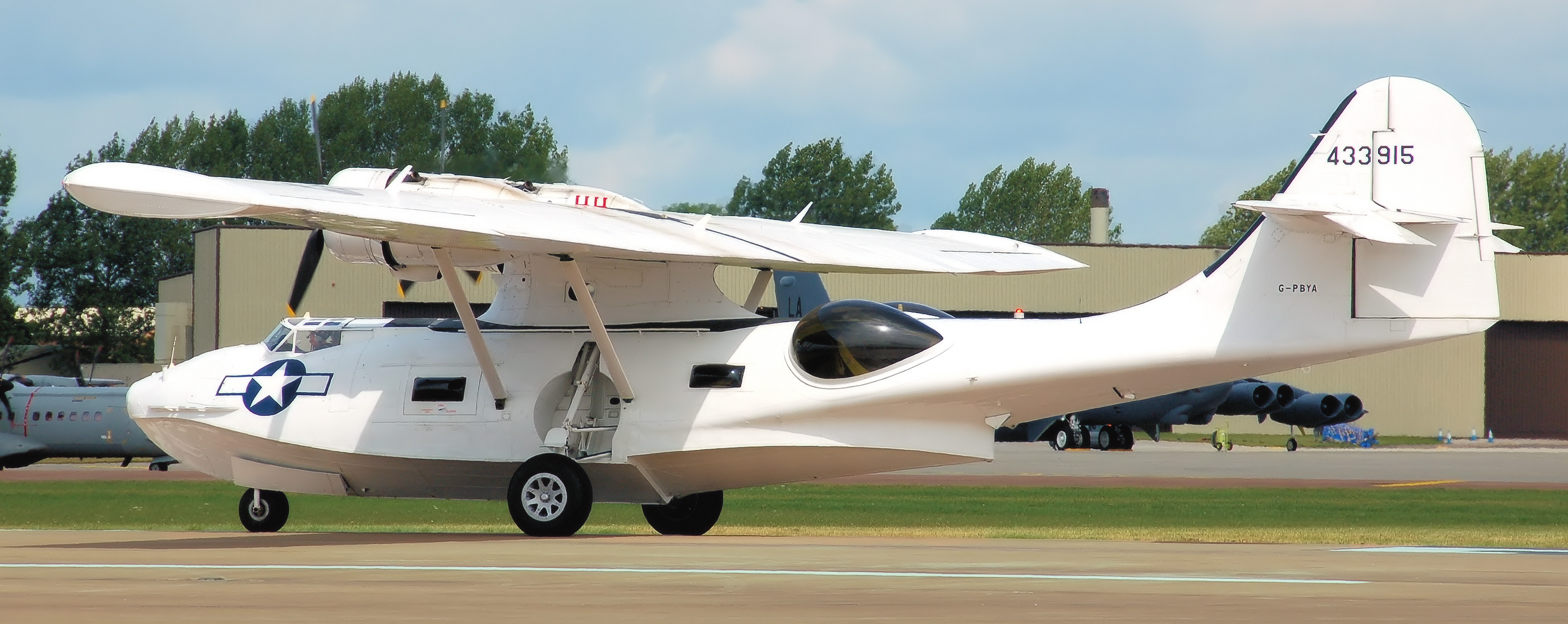
Restored ex-RCAF Canso A (PBV-1A) in US Navy colors, England, 2009

Canso
PB2B-1 flying boats for the RCAF. 17 built.
Canso A
PBV-1A and PB2B-1A amphibious aircraft produced for the RCAF (A = amphibious). 150 PBV-1A and 55 PB2B-1A built.
Canso 2F
Canso A rebuilt as unarmed cargo aircraft (F = freight). Some fitted with Rebecca transponding radar for navigation and some aircraft also carried LORAN.
Canso 2SR
Canso A rebuilt as unarmed search and rescue aircraft (SR = search/rescue). Some fitted with Rebecca transponding radar for navigation and some aircraft also carried LORAN.

=== Other users ===
GST (ГСТ)
Soviet designation for transport versions of the PBY-5 (ГСТ = гидросамолет транспортный, gydrosamoliot transportnyi, "transport seaplane").

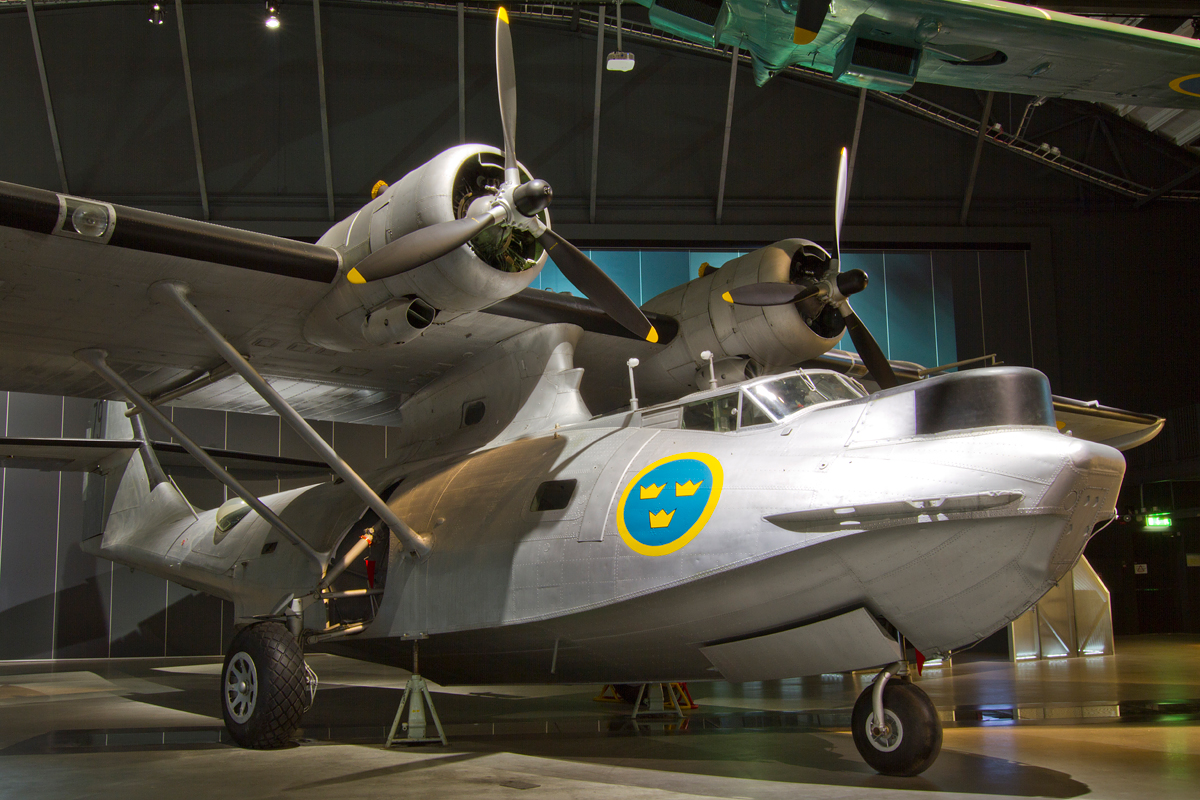
Swedish Air Force "TP 47" Catalina on display at the Swedish Air Force museum in Linköping, Sweden

TP 47
Swedish designation for three unarmed Consolidated Vultee PB4-54 amphibious aircraft used by the Swedish air force from 1946 to 1958 (TP = transport). These were modified with search radars in the nose turret during the early 1950s.
C-10
Brazilian Air Force designation for the PBY-5. Originally designated PA-10 and later CA-10 (not to be confused with civilian CA-10).
C-10A
Brazilian Air Force designation for the PBY-5A. Originally designated CA-10A.
CA-10
In the 1950s several civilian Catalinas were converted as CA-10 cargo transport aircraft, the name being derived from the USAF A-10 (C = cargo).
Steward-Davis Super Catalina ("Super Cat")
Catalina converted to use 1,700 hp (1,300 kW) Wright R-2600 Cyclone 14 engines, with enlarged rudder and other changes.

== Production ==
deliveries of production Consolidated variants to US Navy only
Model	Production period	Quantity
PBY-1	Sep 1936 – Jun 1937	60
PBY-2	May 1937 – Feb 1938	50
PBY-3	Nov 1936 – Aug 1938	66
PBY-4	May 1938 – Jun 1939	32
PBY-5	Sep 1940 – Jul 1943	684
PBY-5A	Oct 1941 – Jan 1945	802
PBY-6A	Jan 1945 – May 1945	175

== Operators ==
- Argentina
- Australia
- Brazil
- Canada
- Chile
- Colombia
- Cuba
- Denmark
- Dominican Republic
- Ecuador
- France
- Greece
- Iceland
- Indonesia
- Israel
- Japan
- Mexico
- Netherlands
- New Zealand
- Nicaragua
- Norway
- Paraguay
- Peru
- Philippines
- South Africa
- Spain
- Sweden
- Soviet Union
- Taiwan
- United Kingdom
- United States
- Uruguay

== Specifications (PBY-5A) ==
Consolidated PBY-5A Catalina drawing

Data from Encyclopedia of World Air Power, Jane's Fighting Aircraft of World War II, Handbook of Erection and Maintenance Instructions for Navy Model PBY-5 and PBY-5A Airplanes, PBY: The Catalina Flying Boat, and Quest for Performance.

General characteristics

- Crew: 8 — pilot, co-pilot, bow turret gunner, flight mechanic, radioman, navigator and two waist gunners
- Length: 63 ft 10 in (19.46 m)
- Wingspan: 104 ft (32 m)
- Height: 21 ft 1 in (6.43 m)
- Wing area: 1,400 sq ft (130 m^{2})
- Aspect ratio: 7.73
- Empty weight: 20,910 lb (9,485 kg)
- Max takeoff weight: 35,420 lb (16,066 kg)
- Fuel capacity: 1,850 US gal (7,000 L; 1,540 imp gal) with self-sealing liner
- Zero-lift drag coefficient: 0.0309
- Drag area: 43.26 ft^{2} (4.02 m^{2})
- Powerplant: 2 × Pratt & Whitney R-1830-92 Twin Wasp 14-cylinder air-cooled radial piston engines, 1,200 hp (890 kW) each
- Propellers: 3-bladed constant-speed propellers

Performance

- Maximum speed: 196 mph (315 km/h, 170 kn)
- Cruise speed: 125 mph (201 km/h, 109 kn)
- Range: 2,520 mi (4,060 km, 2,190 nmi)
- Service ceiling: 15,800 ft (4,800 m)
- Rate of climb: 1,000 ft/min (5.1 m/s)
- Lift-to-drag: 11.9
- Wing loading: 25.3 lb/sq ft (124 kg/m^{2})
- Power/mass: 0.067 hp/lb (0.110 kW/kg)

Armament

- Guns:

- 3 × .30 cal (7.62 mm) machine guns (two in nose turret, one in ventral hatch at tail)
- 2 × .50 cal (12.7 mm) machine guns (one in each waist blister)

- Bombs: 4,000 lb (1,814 kg) of bombs or depth charges under the wings; torpedo racks were also available

== See also ==
- The crash in Norway during Project ZEBRA in 1944

Related development

- Consolidated PB2Y Coronado

Aircraft of comparable role, configuration, and era

- Aichi H9A
- Blackburn Sydney
- Dornier Do 24
- Douglas XP3D
- Kawanishi H6K
- Latécoère 300
- Martin PBM Mariner

Related lists

- List of aircraft of World War II
- List of Consolidated PBY Catalina survivors
- List of flying boats
- List of PBY Catalina operators
