= List of surviving North American P-51 Mustangs =

This is a list of surviving North American P-51 Mustangs, including airworthy planes and planes on display.

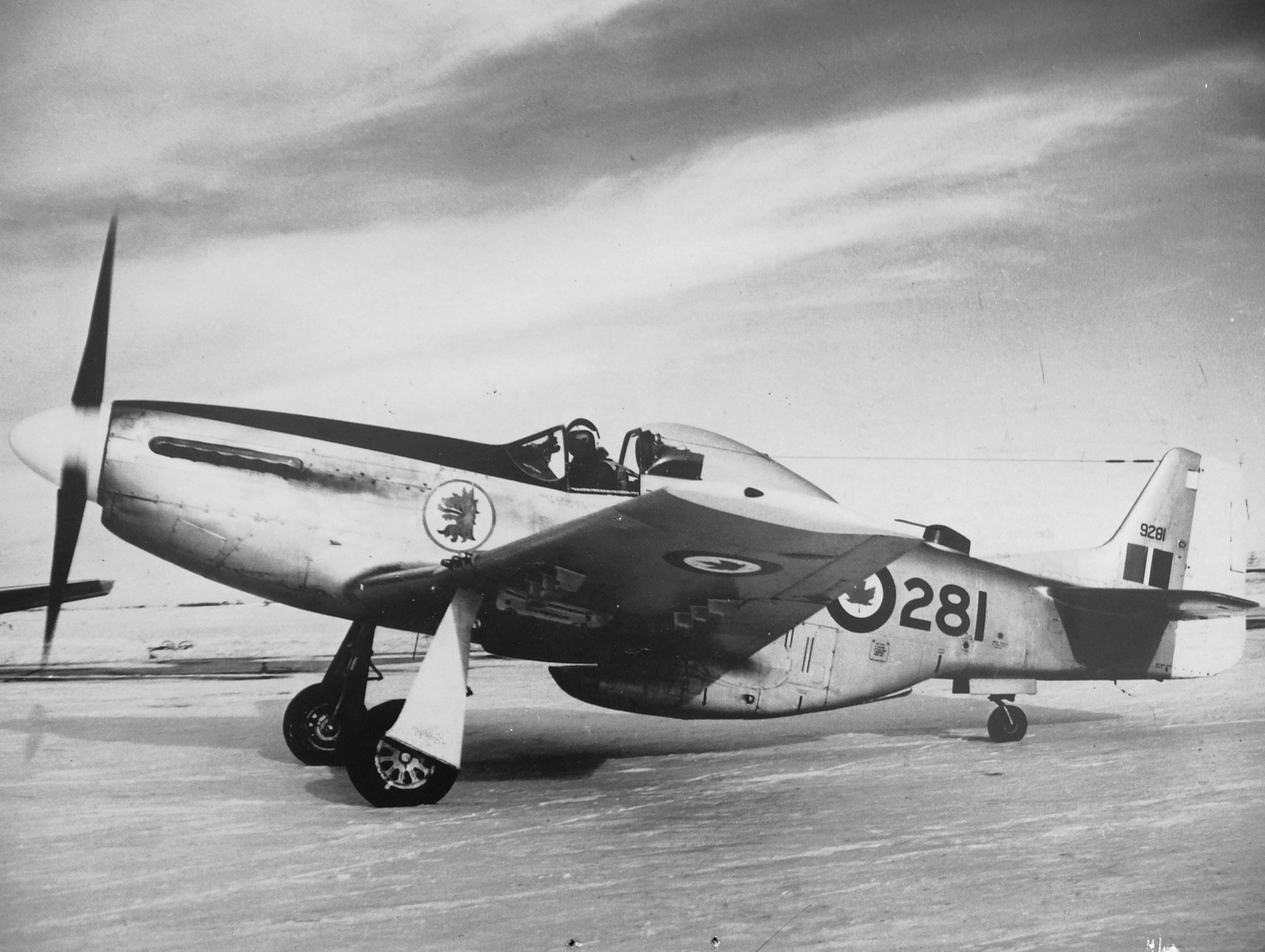
Lynn Garrison with RCAF 9281 – 44–73973, 403 Squadron, RCAF 1956. Subsequently, flown during 1969 Football War as FAS 407. Returned to America by Jerry Janes and flown as "Cottonmouth". Now owned by Fast Toys

== Surviving aircraft ==
=== Australia ===
Airworthy
CA-18 Mustang 21

- A68-104 - Robbie Eastgate, formerly owned by Bob Eastgate (d.2020) at Melbourne, Victoria; one of Australia's oldest operating warbirds, registered as VH-BOB, underwent a 15-year restoration, taking to the air again on 26 January 2023.
- A68-105 (painted as Mustang IV KH677/CV-P) – Judy Pay and Richard Hourigan at Tyabb, Victoria.
- A68-107 – Pay's Air Service in Scone, New South Wales.
- A68-110 (painted as P-51D A68-769) – Caboolture Warplane Museum in Caboolture, Queensland.
- A68-118 – Jeff Trappett in Morwell, Victoria.

CA-18 Mustang 23

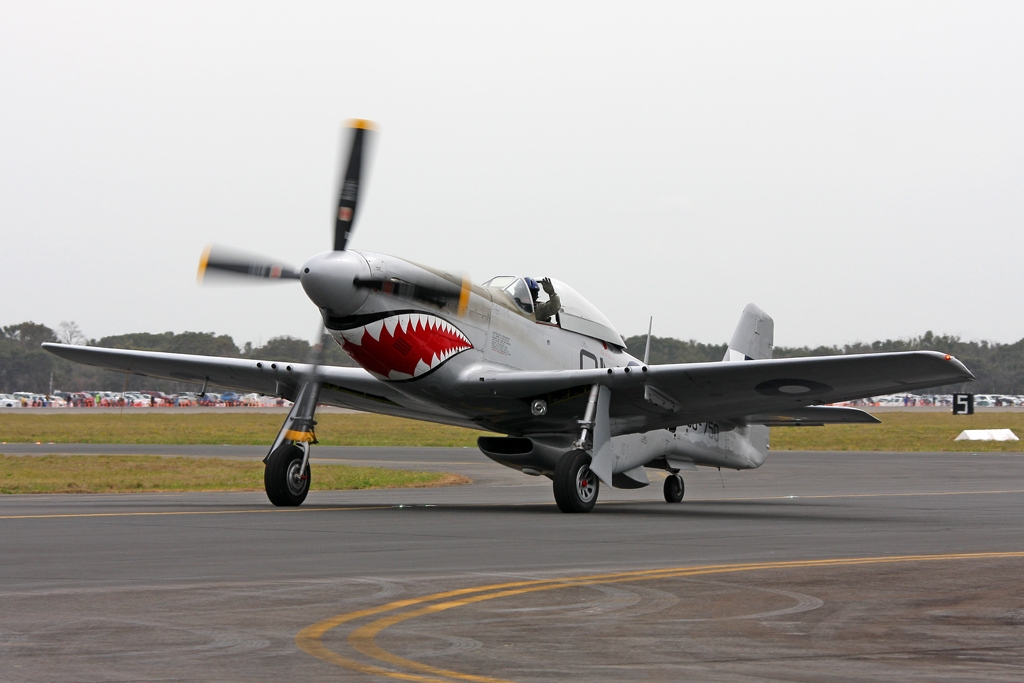
A68-107 at the RAAF Museum in 2010.

- A68-107 – "Duffy's Delight" with the Air Force Heritage Squadron, RAAF Base Point Cook.

CA-18 Mustang 22

- A68-199 – Peter Gill Tyabb, Victoria. Sold to Aerial Speed Icons Shellharbour Airport, New South Wales.

P-51D

- 45-11526 – VH-FST "The Flying Undertaker" Wylie Aviation in Perth, Western Australia.

Since 2016 owned by Bishopp Aviation, Queensland.

On display
P-51D

- A68-648 (44-13106) – Australian War Memorial in Canberra.

Under restoration
CA-17 Mustang 20

- A68-71 – Australian National Aviation Museum at Moorabbin, Victoria.

P-51D

- A68-750 (44-84489) – Peter N. Anderson in Sydney.

=== Austria ===
Airworthy

P-51D

- 44-74427 Nooky Booky IV - based at The Flying Bulls in Salzburg

=== Belgium ===
Airworthy

P-51D

- 45-11495 Little Rebel - privately owned and based at Brasschaat Airfield

=== Canada ===
Airworthy

P-51D

- 44-73210 – CanAm Investments in The Pas, Manitoba.
- 44-73463 – Michael Potter in Ottawa.

On display

P-51D

- 44-73347 – Canada Aviation and Space Museum in Rockcliffe, Ontario.

=== China ===
On display

P-51D

- 44-73920 – Military Museum of the Chinese People's Revolution in Beijing.

P-51K

- 44-12458 – People's Liberation Army Air Force Museum in Changping.

=== Czech Republic ===
Airworthy

P-51D

- 45-11540 Excalibur – sold by Jim Read to a private Czech owner.

=== Dominican Republic ===
On display

P-51D

- 44-72123 – San Isidro Air Force Base in Santo Domingo.

=== France ===
On display

P-51D

- 44-63871 – Musee de l'Air in Paris.

=== Germany ===
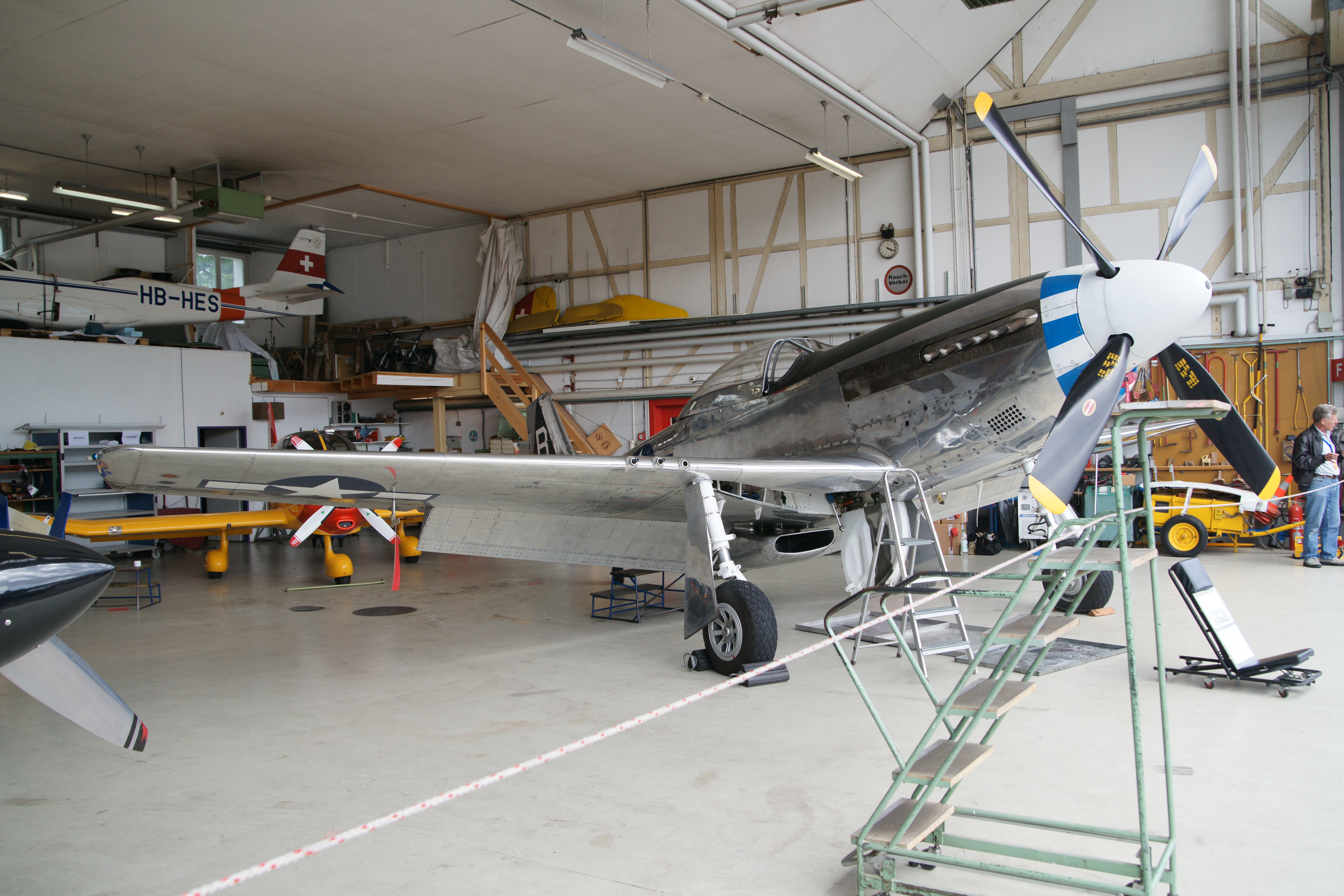
P-51D #44-72773 'Lucky Lady VII'

Airworthy

P-51D

- 44-72773 Lucky Lady VII (D-FPSI) – Christoph Nöthinger in Eschbach, Bremgarten Airfield (EDTG).
- 44-72811 – Stefan Bungarten at Eschbach, Bremgarten Airfield (EDTG).
- 44-73871 – Max Alpha Aviation in Eschbach, Bremgarten Airfield (EDTG).
- 44-73254 Louisiana Kid – Wilhelm Heinz near Bitz, Albstadt-Degerfeld Airfield (EDSA)

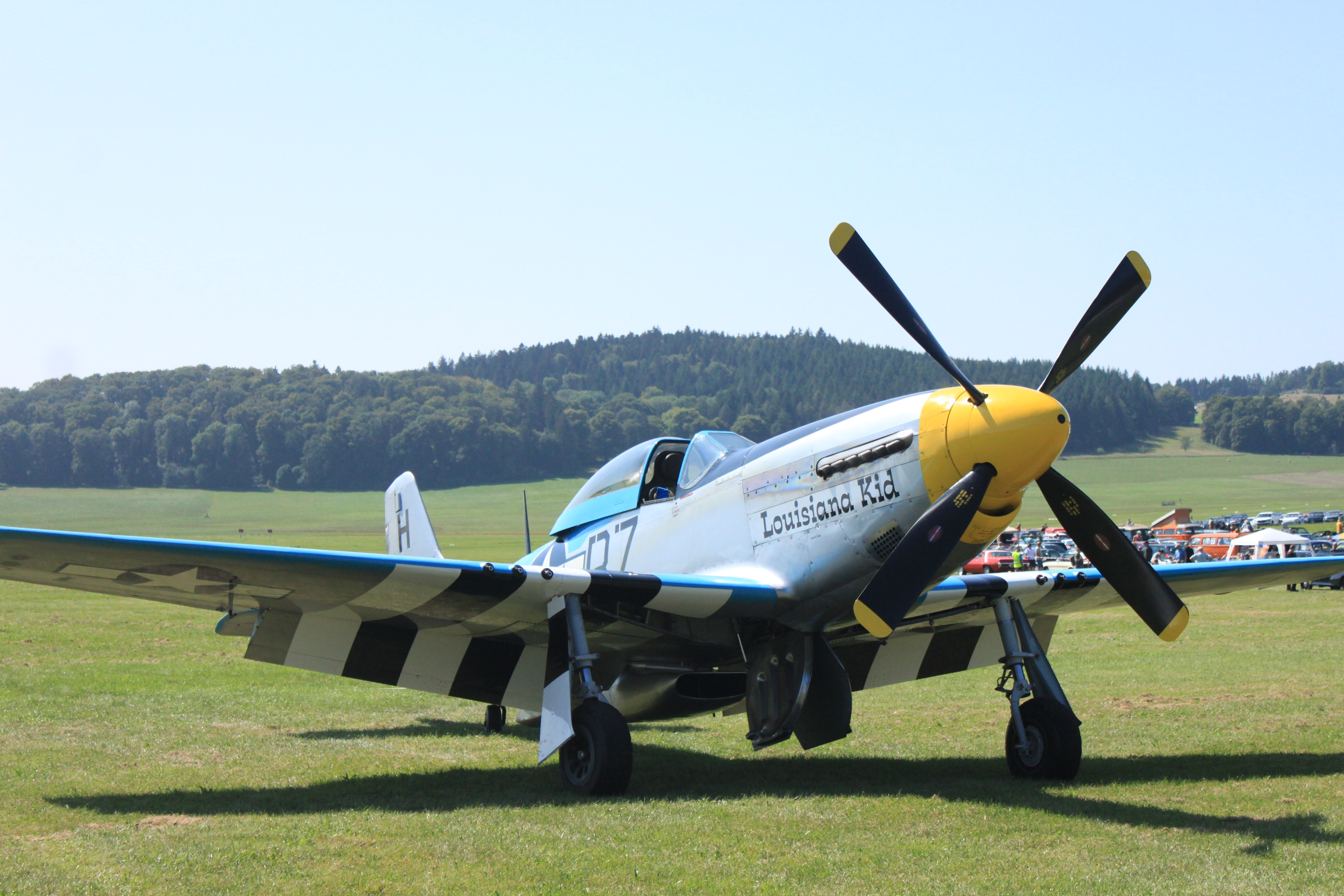
Louisiana Kid at Degerfeld during Fliegerfest 2024

=== Indonesia ===
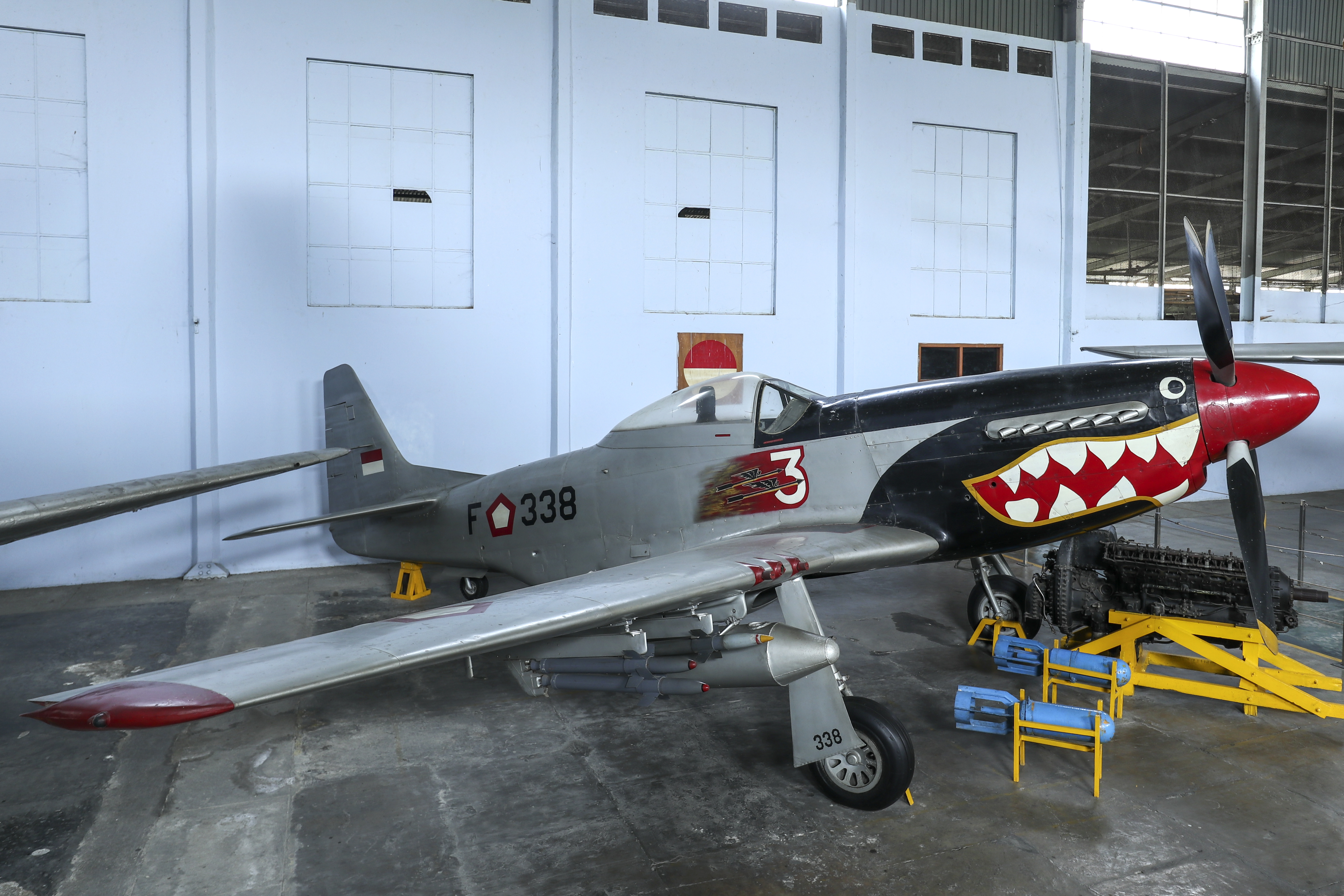
Indonesian Air Force P-51D Mustang at Dirgantara Mandala Museum, Yogyakarta

On display

P-51K

- 44-12752 / F-303 – Halim Perdanakusuma International Airport, East Jakarta, Jakarta.

P-51D

- 44-84801 / F-338 – The Indonesian Air Force HQ, East Jakarta, Jakarta.

Cavalier Mustang II

- 44-74229 / F-362 – The Indonesian Air Force HQ, East Jakarta, Jakarta.
- 44-84473 / F-347 – Satriamandala Museum, South Jakarta, Jakarta.
- Unknown / F-354 – Museum Palagan Ambarawa, Semarang Regency, Central Java. Painted in ML-KNIL livery.
- Unknown / F-361 – Dirgantara Mandala Museum, Sleman Regency, Special Region of Yogyakarta. Painted in Ignatius Dewanto's F-338 livery.
- Unknown / F-363 – Abdul Rachman Saleh Airbase, Malang, East Java.

=== Israel ===
On display

P-51D

- Israeli Defense Force s/n 18 (later, s/n 38) - The Israeli Air Force Museum Collection in Beer Sheva.
- Israeli Defense Force s/n 41 - The Israeli Air Force Museum Collection in Beer Sheva.

P-51K

- 44-11811 – The Israeli Air Force Museum Collection in Beer Sheva.

=== Italy ===
Airworthy

P-51D

- 44-73864 – private owner in Crocetta del Montello.

On display

P-51D

- 44-73444 – Italian Air Force Museum at Vigna di Valle Air Force Base.

=== Mexico ===
Airworthy

P-51D

- 44-72934 – Humberto Lobo in Monterey.

=== Netherlands ===
Airworthy

P-51D

- 44-74425 – 'Damn Yankee' Owner Tom van der Meulen at Oostwold Airport (EHOW).
- 44-74923 – 'Trusty Rusty' Owner 'Early Birds' foundation Lelystad Airport (EHLE).

On display

P-51K

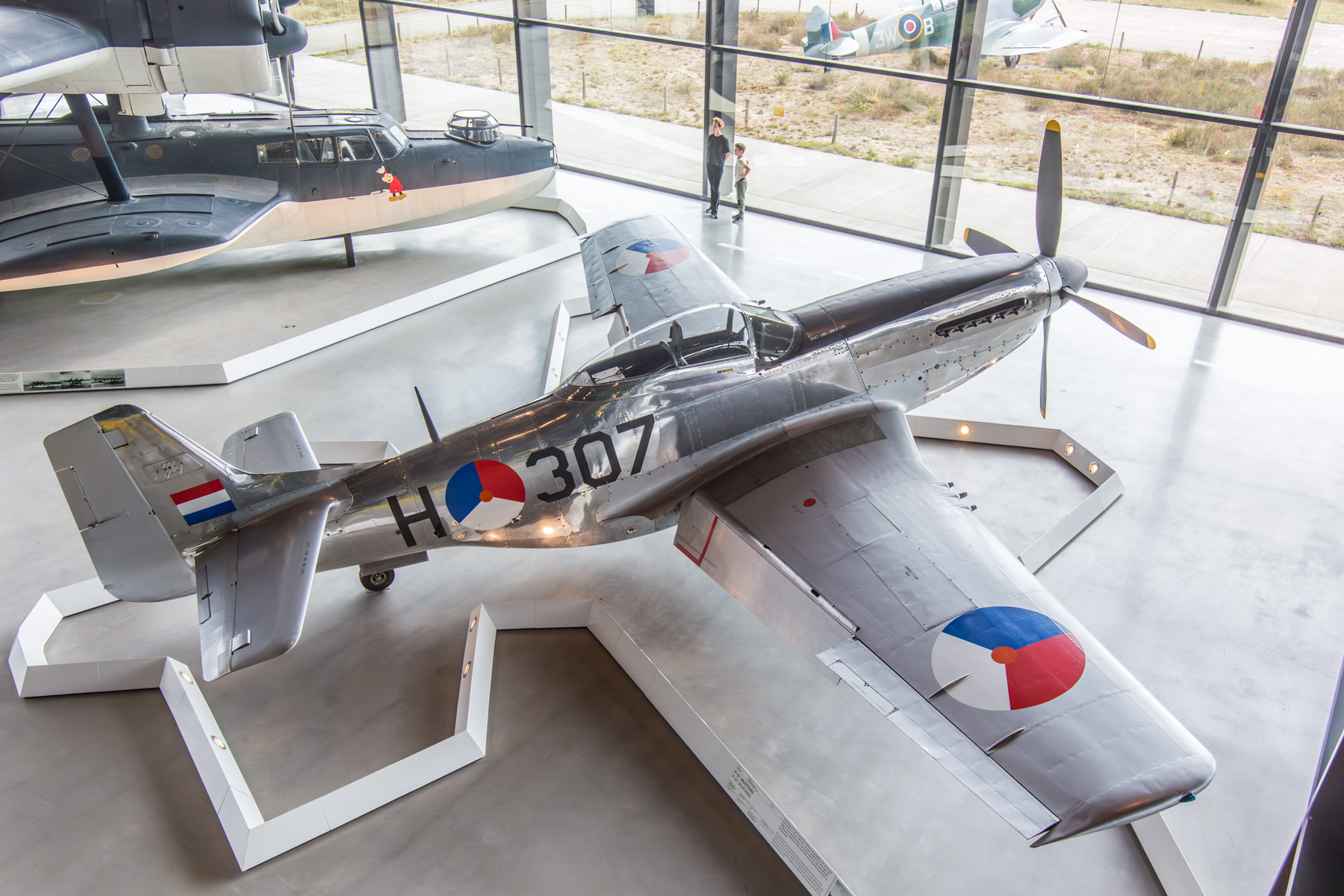
P-51K #44-12525 painted in Dutch East Indies markings, on display at the Nationaal Militair Museum

- 44-12125 – former USAAF plane painted in Dutch East Indies markings on display at The Nationaal Militair Museum in Soesterberg.

=== New Zealand ===
Airworthy

P-51D

- 45-11513 - NZ2423, Brendon Deere/Biggin Hill Trust, RNZAF Ohakea ex John Smith Collection, Mapua.
- 44-74829 – Graham Bethell, based at Ardmore, Auckland.

On display

Cavalier Mustang II

- 44-74827 – Former Indonesian Air Force plane painted in RNZAF markings on display at RNZAF Museum in Wigram Air Force Base.

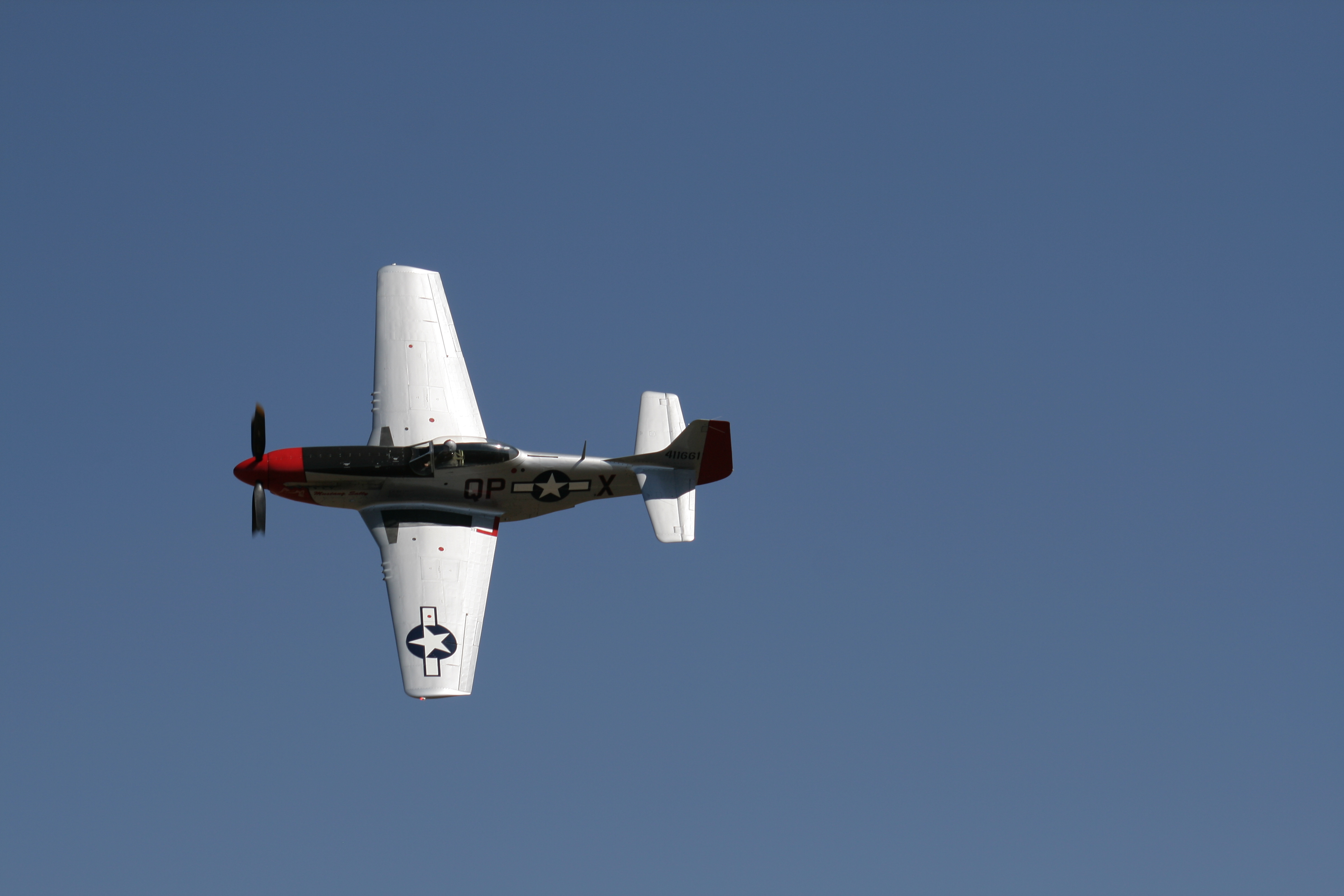
P-51D #44-74494 'Mustang Sally'

=== Philippines ===
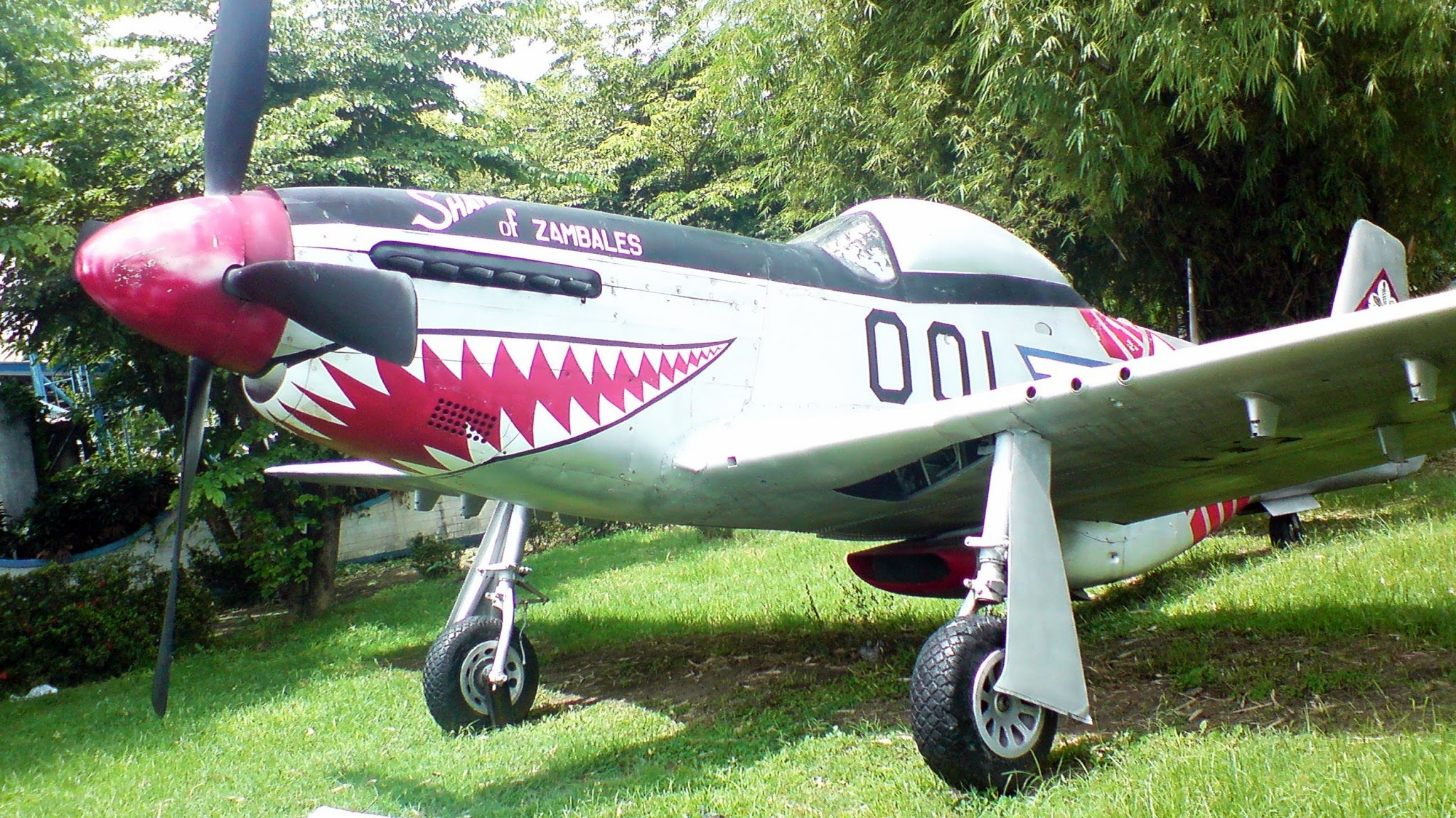
Philippine Air Force P-51D Mustang - Front-Left Side View

On display

P-51D

- 44-74627 - Cesar Basa Air Base.
- 3733/4823 - "Shark of Zambales"Philippine Air Force Aerospace MuseumPasay City.
- 475562 - Captain Jesus Z Singson’s "Red Knight" on display at Zamboanga International Airport. The aircraft had already been repainted, not completely accurately.

=== South Africa ===
Airworthy

P-51D

- 44-74494 - Mustang Sally - Rand Airport FAGM (Previously based in USA; "Mustang Sally", "Mangia Pane" & "Iron Ass")

Under restoration

P-51D

- 44-72202 – Patsy Dawn - SAAF Museum at Swartkop Air Force Base.

=== South Korea ===
On display

P-51D

- Jeju Aerospace Museum, Jeju Island
- KAI Aerospace Museum, Sacheon
- National Aviation Museum of Korea, Gimpo
- Korea Air Force Academy

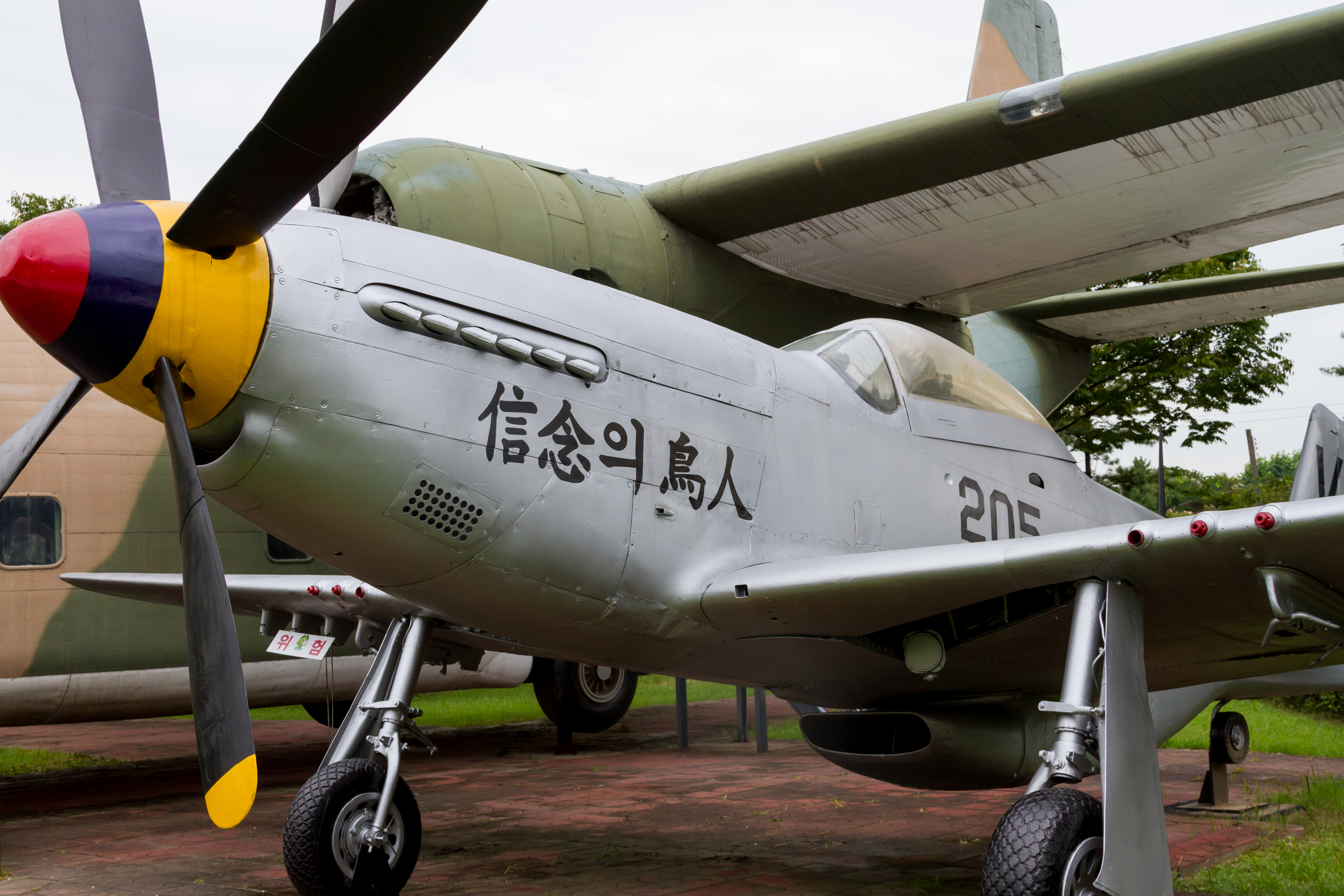
A P-51D Mustang on display at the War Memorial of Korea

- 44-73494 – War Memorial of Korea in Seoul.
- 44-84669 – War Memorial of Korea in Seoul.

=== Sweden ===
Airworthy

Cavalier Mustang II

- 44-10753 (adopted serial number, exact identity of a/c is unknown). Former Salvadoran Air Force FAS 405 – Biltema Nordic Services AB. Aircraft based in Ängelholm.

On display

P-51D

- 44-63992 Swedish Air Force number 26020 – Swedish Air Force Museum, Linköping.

P-51D

- 44-72112 Swedish Air Force number 26084 – wreckage salvaged from a moor near Vidsel in 1998. Restored and is now on display at Flygmuseet F21, Luleå.

=== Switzerland ===
On display

P-51D

- 44-73349 – Swiss Air Force Museum in Dubendorf.

=== Turkey ===
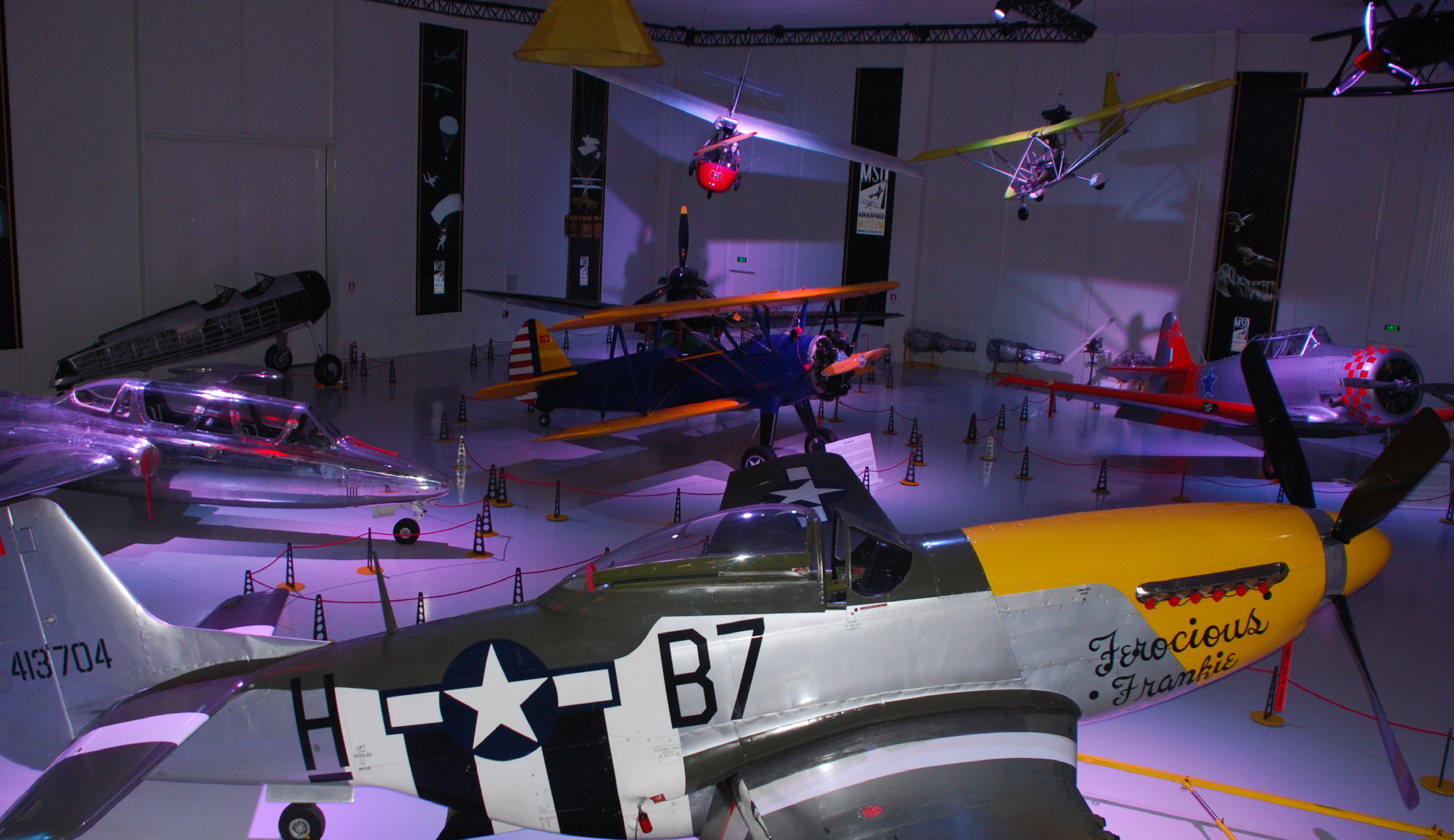
Ferocious Frankie in Eskisehir.

Airworthy

P-51D

- 44-13704 Ferocious Frankie – M.S.Ö. Air & Space Museum, Sivrihisar.

=== United Kingdom ===
Airworthy

P-51D

- 44-13521 Marinell – privately owned in North Weald, Essex.
- 44-72035 – Hangar 11 Collection in North Weald, Essex.
- 44-72216 – Robs Lamplough in Duxford and North Weald.
- 44-73149 – Old Flying Machine Company in Duxford.
- 44-73877 – Shaun Patrick, Sharkmouth Ltd., Goodwood.

On display

P-51D

- 44-14574 – East Essex Aviation Museum in Essex.
- 44-73979 – The Imperial War Museum in London.
- 44-74409 Donald – RAF Museum in Hendon.
- 44-73415 – RAF Museum Cosford.

Under restoration

P-51D

- 44-13954 – Mustang Restoration Group in Coventry.
- 44-14291 – Phil G. Earthey.
- 44-73098 – Aces High Ltd., Duxford.
- 44-73822 Lil Margaret – privately owned in Bungay, Norfolk.

Other

P-51D

- 45-11518 – Maurice Hammond in Eye, Suffolk. Airworthy until crashed at Hardwick, Norfolk on October 2, 2016.
- 44-84847 – Miss Velma, of The Fighter Collection, in Duxford. The aircraft experienced engine problems concluding an exhibit and force-landed short of the Duxford runway in a wheat field. The crew was unharmed; the aircraft received moderate damage. The aircraft is currently undergoing repairs to airworthy condition.

=== United States ===
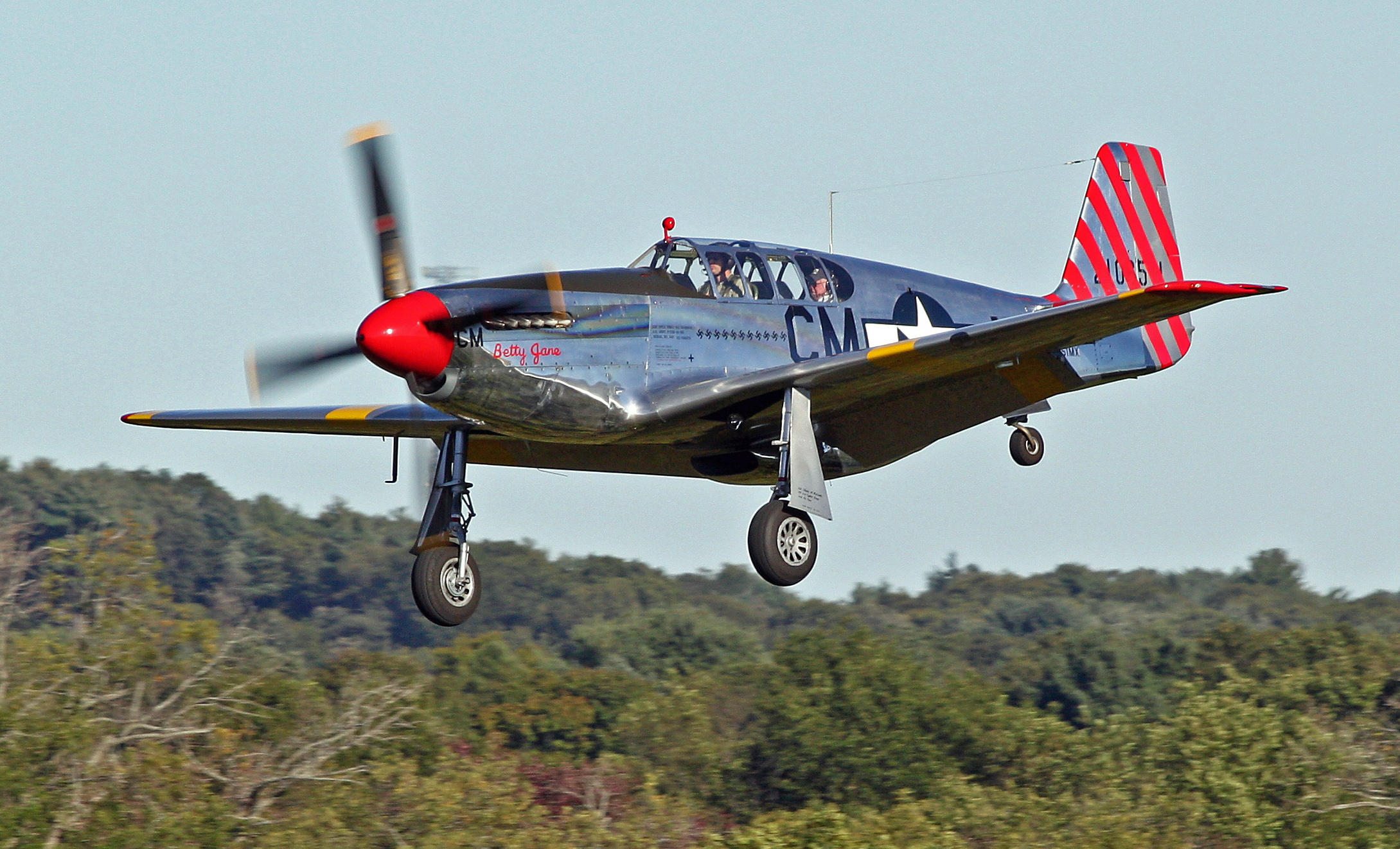
TP-51C #42-103293 "Betty Jane" appears at Airshows around the United States

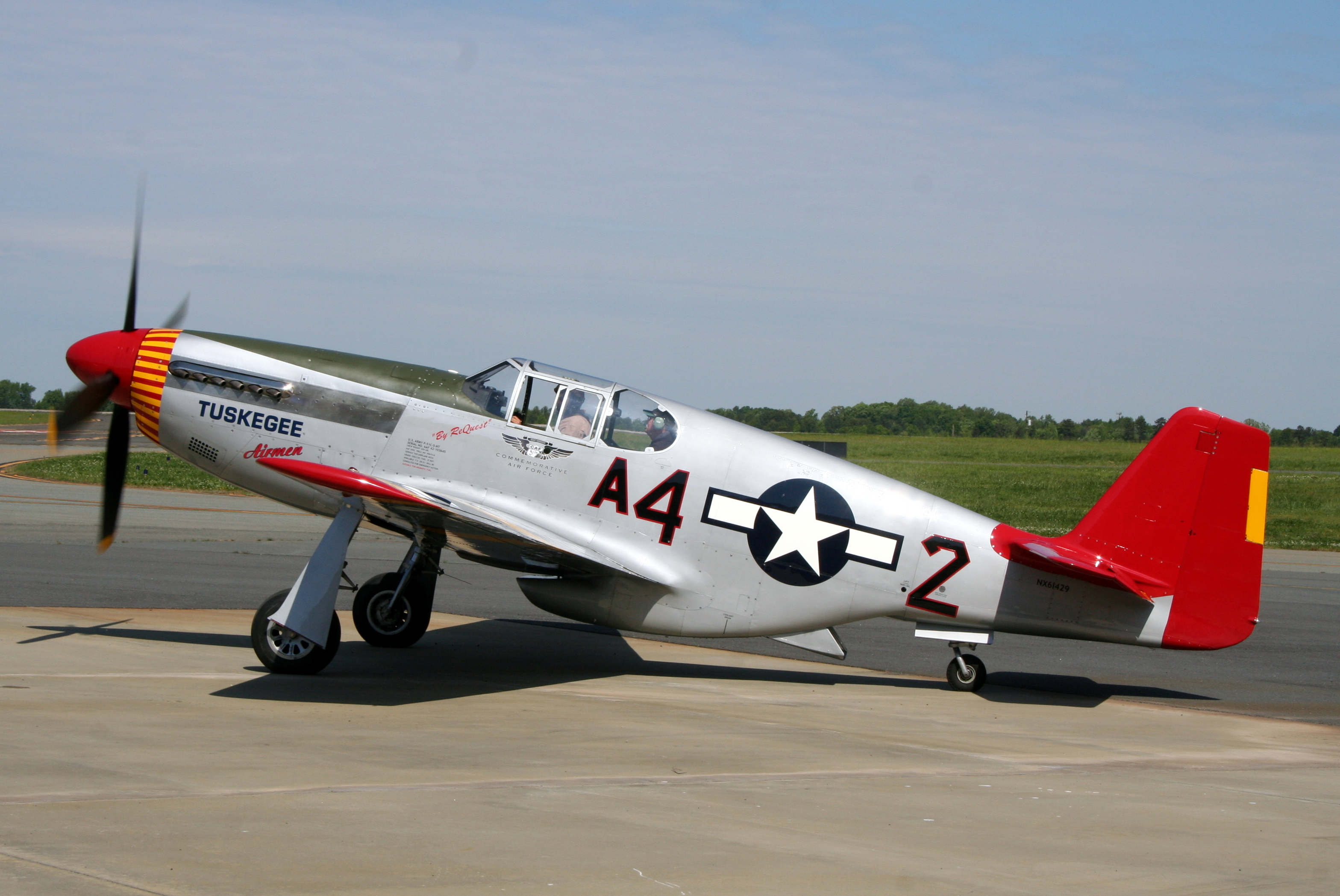
P-51C #42-103645 in Tuskegee Airmen livery as flown by Commemorative Air Force

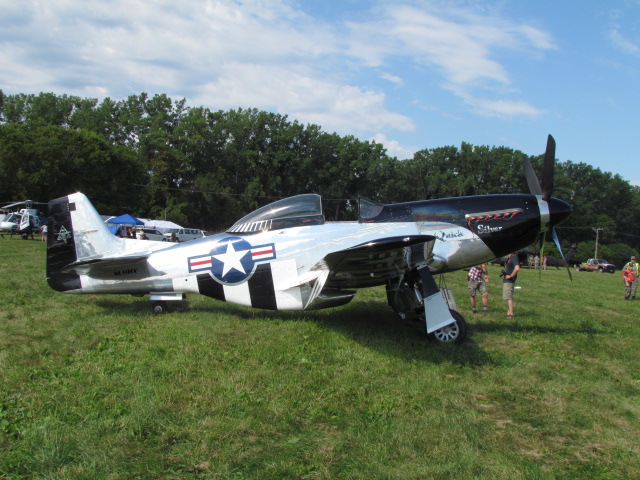
P-51D #45-11439 "Quicksilver" at the Geneseo (NY) Air Show, July 2017

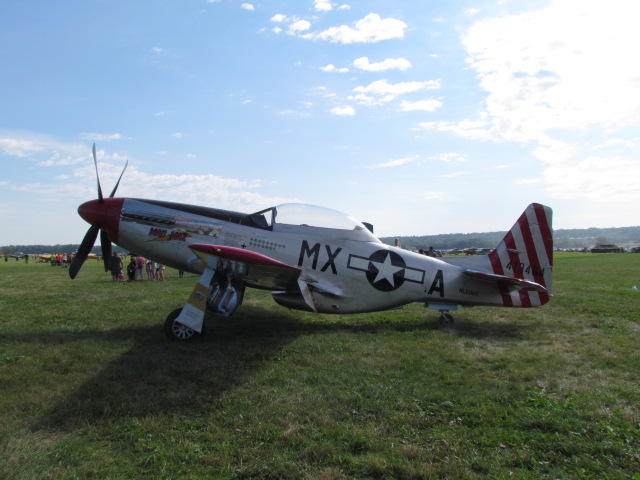
P-51D #45-11559 "Mad Max" at the Geneseo (NY) Air Show, July 2017

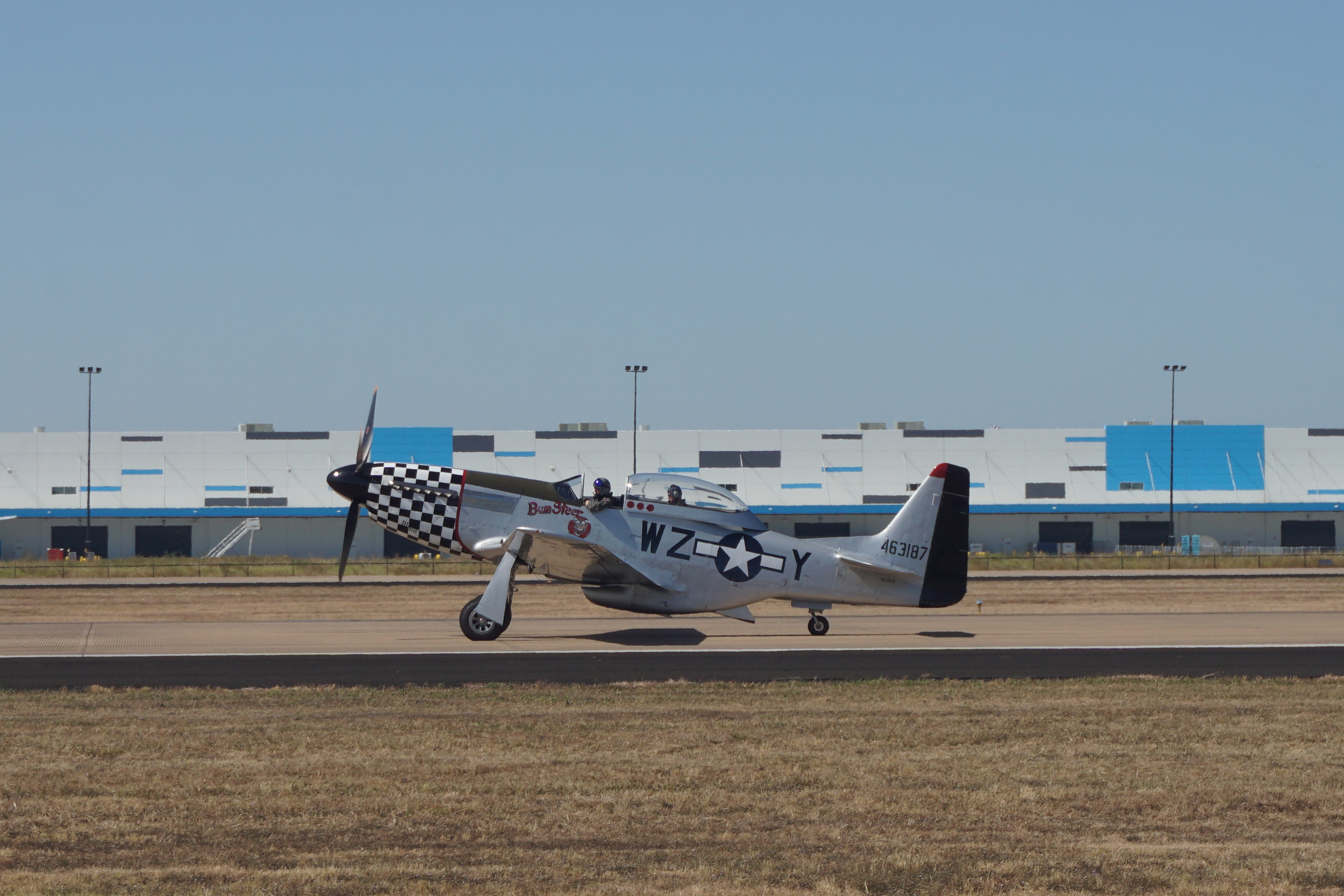
P-51D #67-14866 "Bum Steer" at the 2019 Fort Worth Alliance Air Show

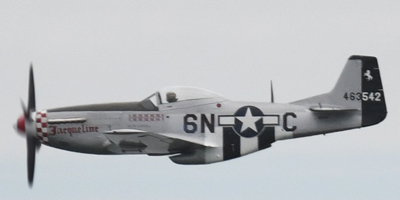
P-51D #44-63542 "Jacqueline" at the 2021 Bethpage Air Show

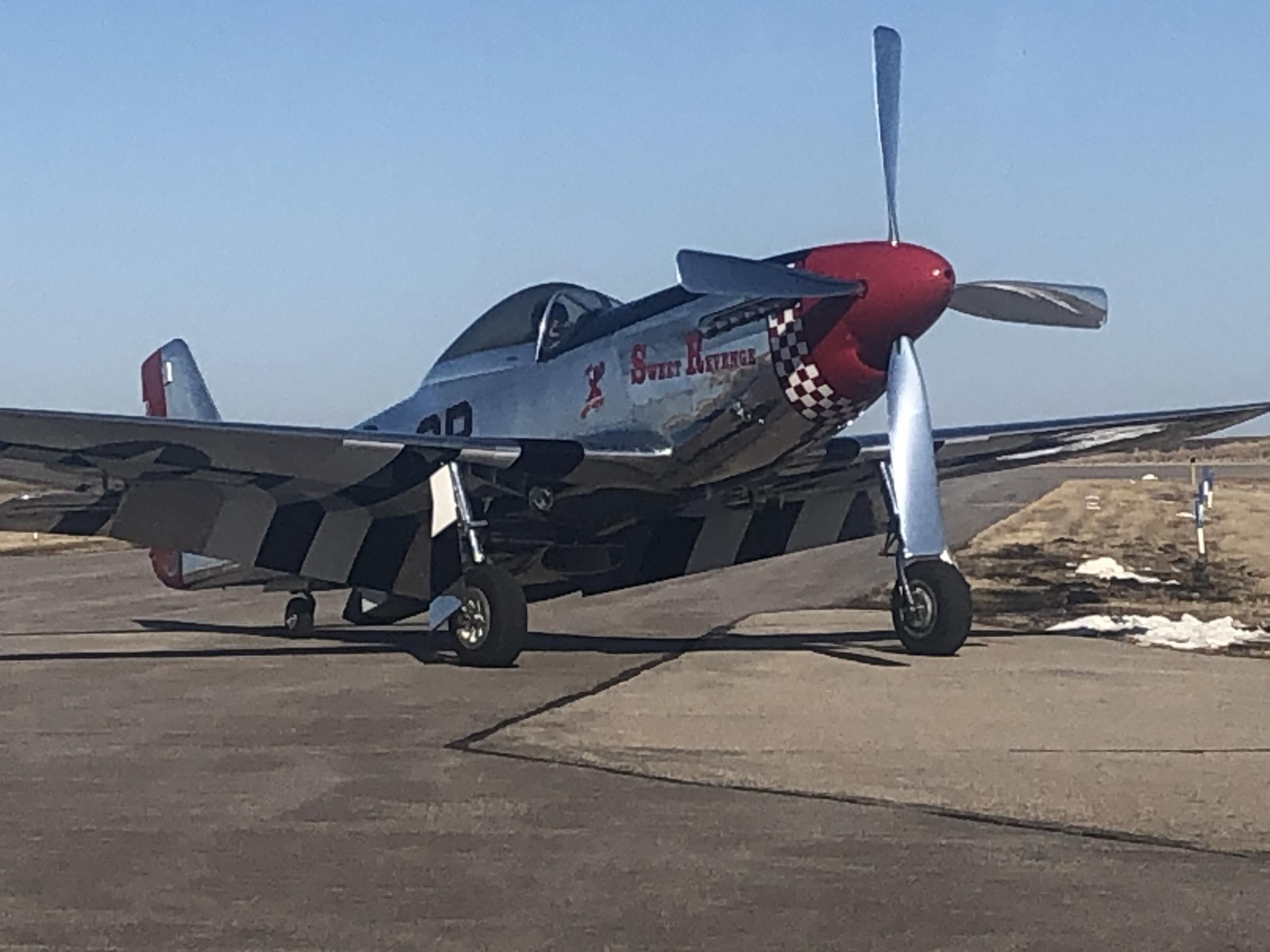
P-51D-12 #44-72051 'Sweet Revenge' taken at the Fagan Fighters WWII Museum in Granite falls Minnesota

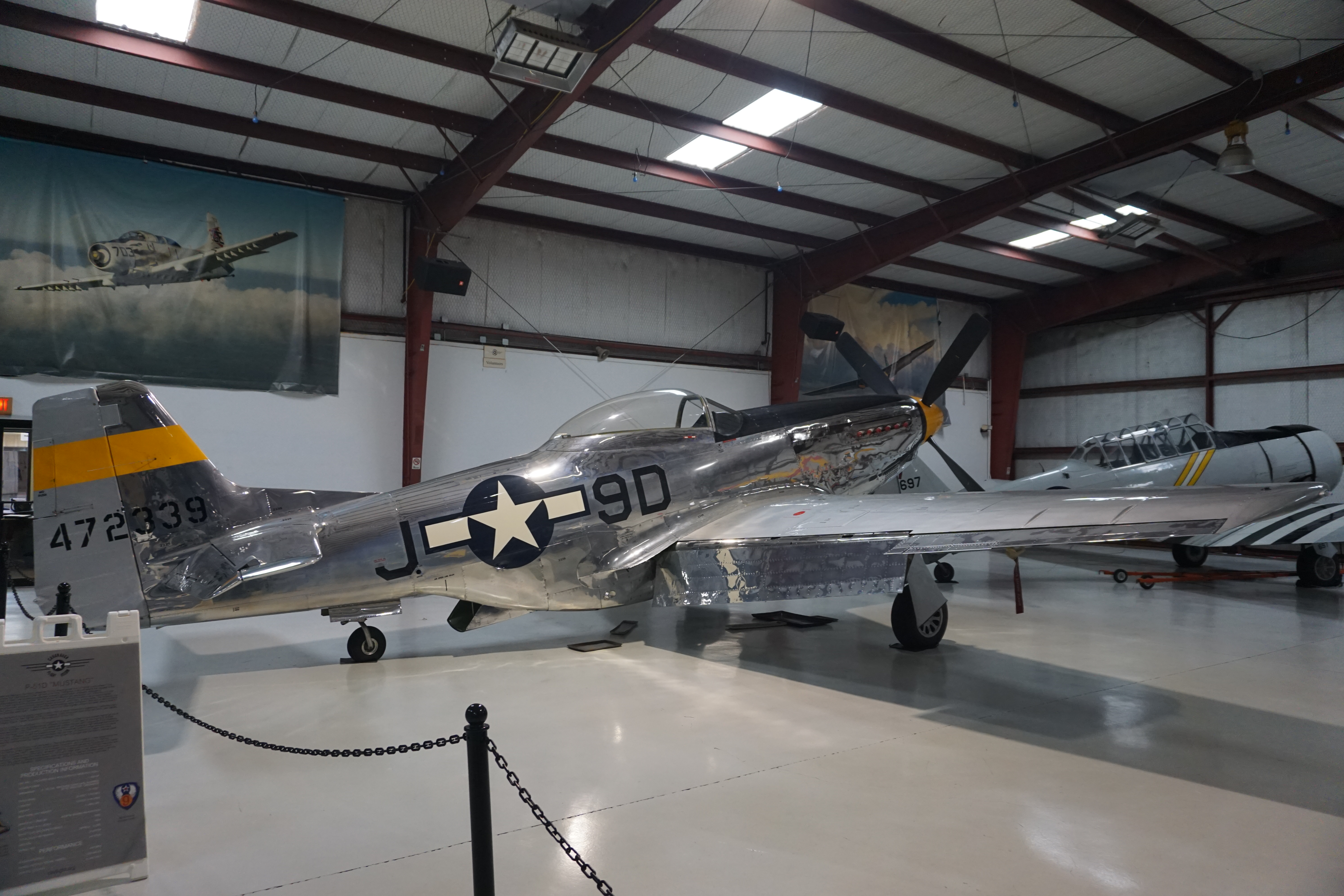
P-51D #44-72339 at the Cavanaugh Flight Museum

==== Airworthy ====
CA-17 Mustang 20

- A68-1 (painted as 44-15757 Jeannie Too) – privately owned in Troy, Alabama.
- A68-39 (painted as 44-14826) – based at Erickson Aircraft Collection in Madras, Oregon.

CA-18 Mustang 21

- A68-100 (painted as 44-14777 Flying Dutchman) – privately owned in Snellville, Georgia.

CA-18 Mustang 22

- A68-187 (painted as 44-74839 La Pistolera) – based at Lewis Air Legends in San Antonio, Texas.
- A68-198 (painted as 45-11483 Short-Fuse-Salle) – privately owned in Ozona, Texas.

CA-18 Mustang 23

- A68-175 (painted as 44-74950 Slender Tender Tall) – privately owned in Wilmington, Delaware.

Cavalier Mustang II

- 67-14866 Bum Steer – privately owned in Houston, Texas.
- 67-22579 Mormon Mustang – privately owned in Rexburg, Idaho.
- 67-22580 Six Shooter – privately owned in Ennis, Montana.
- 67-22581 Lou IV – based at the Mid America Flight Museum in Mount Pleasant, Texas.

P-51A

- 43-6006 (unnamed, painted as XP-51 41-039) – privately owned in Syracuse, Kansas.
- 43-6251 Mrs. Virginia – based at Planes of Fame in Chino, California.

P-51B

- 42-106602 Shillelaugh – Based at Dakota Territory Air Museum
- 42-106638 Impatient Virgin – based at Historic Flight Foundation in Spokane, Washington.
- 43-12252 Old Crow – privately owned (Jack Roush) in Livonia, Michigan.
- 43-24837 Berlin Express – privately owned in Houston, Texas.

P-51C

- 42-103645 Tuskegee Airmen – based at Commemorative Air Force (Red Tail Squadron) in South St. Paul, Minnesota.
- 42-103831 Ina the Macon Belle – based at Fantasy of Flight in Polk City, Florida.
- 43-24907 Lope's Hope 3rd – based at Dakota Territory Air Museum in Minot, North Dakota.
- 43-25057 Boise Bee – based at Warhawk Air Museum in Nampa, Idaho.
- 43-25147 Princess Elizabeth – privately owned in Houston, Texas.

TP-51C

- 42-103293 Betty Jane – based at Collings Foundation in Stow, Massachusetts.

P-51D

- 44-10755 Cottonmouth – privately owned in Bridgman, Michigan.
- 44-11153 Kimberly Kaye – privately owned in Pleasanton, California.
- 44-12858 Sonny Boy – privately owned in Edmonds, Washington.
- 44-13105 Strega – privately owned in Bakersfield, California.
- 44-13250 Ridge Runner III – privately owned in Blaine, Minnesota.
- 44-13253 Korbel Champagne Mustang, formerly Goldfinger – privately owned in Guerneville, California.
- 44-13257 Slender Tender & Tall – privately owned in Sarasota, Florida.
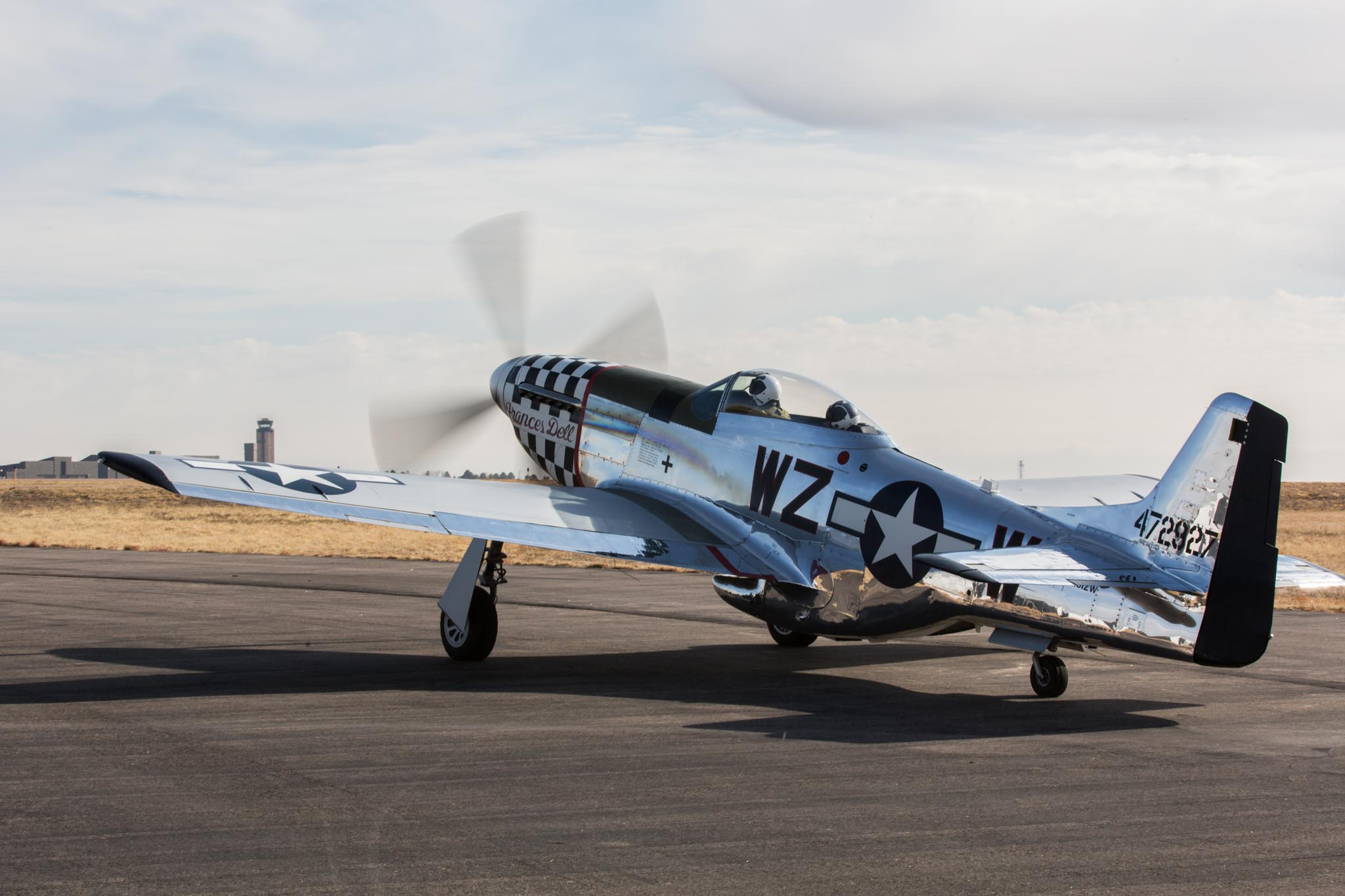
- P-51D #44-13903 Frances Dell departs the National Museum of WWII Aviation in Colorado Springs, CO
  44-13903 Frances Dell – privately owned in Louisville, Colorado.
- 44-14985 Millie G – privately owned in Tulsa, Oklahoma.
- 44-63350 Lou IV – privately owned in Wenatchee, Washington.
- 44-63473 Big Beautiful Doll – privately owned in Sacramento, California.
- 44-63476 KWITCHERBITCHEN – privately owned in Philadelphia, Pennsylvania.
- 44-63542 Jacqueline – previously privately owned in Carson City, Nevada. Now based at the American Airpower Museum in Republic Airport, Farmingdale, Long Island, New York since 2018.
- 44-63576 (unnamed) – privately owned in McMinnville, Oregon.
- 44-63577 Was That Too Fast – privately owned in Bentonville, Arkansas.
- 44-63663 Miss Marilyn II – privately owned in San Antonio, Texas.
- 44-63675 Sierra Sue II/ Gul Kalle – privately owned in Santa Ana, California.
- 44-63701 Grim Reaper – privately owned in San Jose, California.
- 44-63807 Daddy's Girl – privately owned in McClellan, California.
- 44-63864 Twilight Tear – based at Fagen Fighters WWII Museum in Granite Falls, Minnesota.
- 44-63865 Tempus Fugit - privately owned in Jonesboro, Arkansas.
- 44-63893 Glamorous Glen III – privately owned in Reno, Nevada.
- 44-64122 Kansas City Kitty – privately owned in Jefferson City, Missouri.
- 44-72051 Sweet Revenge – based at Fagen Fighters WWII Museum in Granite Falls, Minnesota.
- 44-72145 Petie 3rd – privately owned in Santa Barbara, California.
- 44-72192 Straw Boss 2 – based at California Warbirds in Hollister, California.
- 44-72339 The Brat III – based at the Cavanaugh Flight Museum in Denison, Texas. Removed from public display when the museum's former Addison, Texas, location closed on 1 January 2024.
- 44-72364 Upupa Epops – based at The Flying Heritage Collection in Everett, Washington.
- 44-72438 Hell-er Bust – privately owned in Boise, Idaho.
- 44-72483 Double Trouble Two – based at Military Aviation Museum in Pungo, Virginia.
- 44-72739 Man O War – based at Commemorative Air Force (Southern California Wing) Camarillo, California.
- 44-72777 Blondie – privately owned in Klamath, California.
- 44-72907 Red Dog XII – privately owned in Castro Valley, California.
- 44-72942 Petie 2nd – privately owned in Pewaukee, Wisconsin.
- 44-73029 Bald Eagle – privately owned in Philadelphia, Pennsylvania.
- 44-73079 Primo Branco – privately owned in Half Moon Bay, California.
- 44-73129 Merlin's Magic – privately owned in Danville, California.
- 44-73140 Petie 2nd – privately owned in New Iberia, Louisiana.
- 44-73142 E Pluribus Unum – privately owned in Port Orange, Florida.
- 44-73206 Hurry Home Honey – privately owned in Blowing Rock, North Carolina.

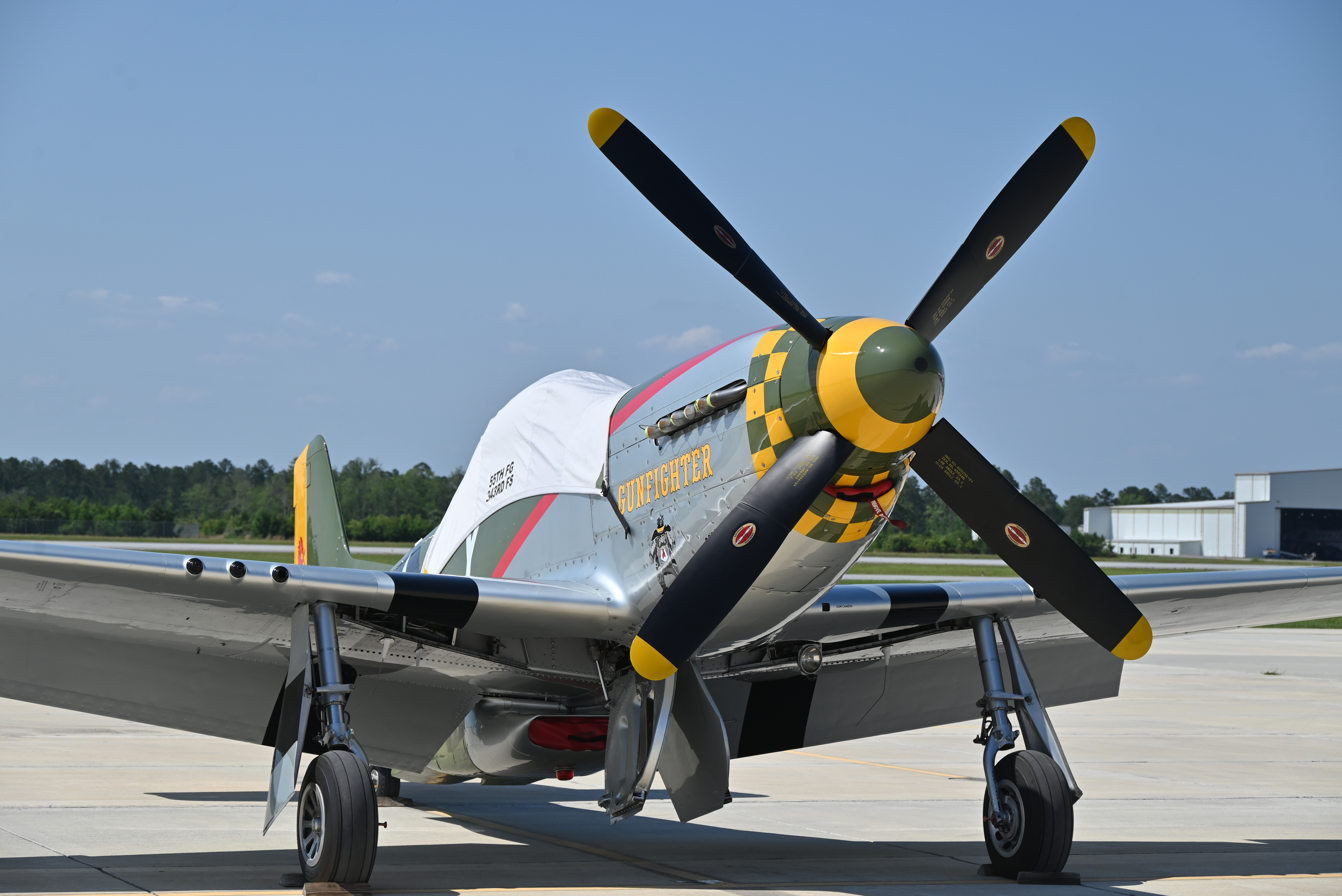
P-51D #44-73264 Gunfighter (Commemorative Air Force)

- 44-73264 Gunfighter – based at Commemorative Air Force (Gunfighter Sponsor Group) in Council Bluffs, Iowa.
- 44-73275 Never Miss – privately owned in Perth, New York.
- 44-73279 Sweet and Lovely – privately owned in Alva, Oklahoma.
- 44-73287 Worry Bird – based at Air Combat Museum in Springfield, Illinois.
- 44-73343 Live Bait – based at Lewis Air Legends in Houston, Texas.
- 44-73415 VooDoo – based at Planes of Fame in Chino, California.
- 44-73420 (unnamed) – based at Allied Fighters in Sun Valley, Idaho.
- 44-73436 American Beauty – based at Olympic Flight Museum in Olympia, Washington.
- 44-73454 This Is It – privately owned in New Castle, Delaware.
- 44-73543 Sweetie Face – privately owned in North Fort Myers, Florida.
- 44-73656 Moonbeam McSwine – based at Warbird Heritage Foundation in Waukegan, Illinois
- 44-73704 Weaver's Nude – privately owned in Los Altos, California.
- 44-73751 Miss Kandy – privately owned in Los Angeles, California.
- 44-73843 Old Red Nose – based at Commemorative Air Force (Dixie Wing) in Peachtree City, Georgia.
- 44-73856 Double Trouble Two – privately owned in Houston, Texas.
- 44-73990 Alabama Rammer Jammer – privately owned in Geiger, Alabama.
- 44-74008 Comfortably Numb – privately owned in Lodi, California.
- 44-74009 Ain't Missbehavin – privately owned in Shoal Creek, Alabama.
- 44-74012 (unnamed) – based at Stonehenge Air Museum in Lincoln County, Montana.
- 44-74202 Swamp Fox – privately owned in Concord, North Carolina.
- 44-74230 Gentleman Jim – privately owned (Jack Roush) in Livonia, Michigan.
- 44-74389 Speedball Alice – privately owned in Sebastopol, California.
- 44-74391 The Hun Hunter/Texas – privately owned in Houston, Texas.
- 44-74404 Dazzling Donna – privately owned in Kindred, North Dakota.
- 44-74423 Miss Van Nuys – privately owned in Los Angeles, California.
- 44-74458 Sizzlin' Liz – privately owned in Jacksonville, Florida.
- 44-74466 Barbara Jean – privately owned in Raymond, Nebraska.
- 44-74483 (unnamed) – privately owned in Vineburg, California.
- 44-74497 Little Witch – privately owned in Kissimmee, Florida.
- 44-74502 Crazy Horse 2 – privately owned in Kissimmee, Florida.
- 44-74506 Lady B – privately owned in Port Orange, Florida.
- 44-74524 Dakota Kid/Long Island Kid – based at Dakota Territory Air Museum in Minot, North Dakota.
- 44-74536 Miss America – based at Oklahoma Museum of Flying in Oklahoma City, Oklahoma.
- 44-74582 Crusader – privately owned in Denver, Colorado.
- 44-74602 (unnamed) – privately owned in Ione, California.
- 44-74739 Ole Yeller – based at Legacy Flight Museum in Rexburg, Idaho.
- 44-74774 Old Crow – privately owned in Wilmington, Delaware.
- 44-74832 Boomer – based at Fargo Air Museum in Fargo, North Dakota.
- 44-74865 My Sweet Mary Lou – privately owned in Provo, Utah.
- 44-74813 Cripes a Mighty – privately owned in Coshocton, Ohio.
- 44-74878 (unnamed) – privately owned in Indianapolis, Indiana.
- 44-74908 Bunny – based at Palm Springs Air Museum in Palm Springs, California.
- 44-74976 Obsession – privately owned in Port Orange, Florida.
- 44-74977 Charlotte's Chariot II – privately owned in Helena, Montana.
- 44-74996 Dago Red – privately owned in Kerman, California.
- 44-75009 Rosalie – privately owned in Carson City, Nevada.
- 44-75452 Happy Jack's Go Buggy – privately owned in San Antonio, Texas.
- 44-84390 Bardahl Special – privately owned in McKinleyville, California.
- 44-84410 Cincinnati Miss – based at Tri-State Warbird Museum in Batavia, Ohio.
- 44-84615 Blood Brother – privately owned in Sidney, Montana.
- 44-84655 Toulouse Nuts – based at the Collings Foundation in Stow, Massachusetts.This aircraft has two seats.
- 44-84658 The Friendly Ghost – based at War Eagles Air Museum in Santa Teresa, New Mexico.
- 44-84745 Crazy Horse – privately owned in Nashua, New Hampshire.
- 44-84753 Buzzin Cuzzin – privately owned in Holderness, New Hampshire.
- 44-84860 Lady Jo – privately owned in Cloverdale, California.
- 44-84864 (unnamed) – privately owned in Hayward, California.
- 44-84900 NACA 127 – privately owned in Las Vegas, Nevada.
- 44-84933 The Rebel – privately owned in Wellington, Florida.
- 44-84952 Sarah Jean – privately owned in Wilmington, Delaware.
- 44-84961 Wee Willy II – based at Planes of Fame in Chino, California.
- 45-11367 Angels Playmate – privately owned in Cheraw, South Carolina.
- 45-11391 Boo Man Choo – privately owned in Wilmington, Delaware.
- 45-11439 Quicksilver – privately owned in Maxwelton, West Virginia.
- 45-11471 Diamondback – privately owned in Boise, Idaho.
- 45-11495 Little Rebel – privately owned in Alva, Oklahoma.
- 45-11507 Cripes a Mighty 3rd – based at Fantasy of Flight in Polk City, Florida.
- 45-11525 Val Halla – based at Heritage Flight Museum in Eastsound, Washington.
- 45-11553 Shangri-La – privately owned in Montgomery, Texas.
- 45-11558 (unnamed) – privately owned in Los Angeles, California.
- 45-11559 Mad Max – privately owned in Little Falls, New Jersey.
- 45-11582 Dolly – based at Planes of Fame in Chino, California.
- 45-11586 Little Horse – based at Dakota Territory Air Museum in Minot, North Dakota.
- 45-11628 Ho Hun – privately owned in Mesa, Arizona.
- 45-11633 Lady Alice – privately owned in Wilmington, Delaware.
- 45-11636 Stang Evil – privately owned in Lakewood, Colorado.

P-51H

- 44-64314 (unnamed) – privately owned in Alamo, California.

P-51K

- 44-12016 Fragile but Agile – privately owned in Houston, Texas.
- 44-12840 Kiss Me Kate – privately owned by Tom Cruise via Valhalla Aviation Inc. in Los Angeles, California. Cruise personally flew the plane in the movie Top Gun: Maverick.
- 44-12852 Frenesi – privately owned in Houston, Texas.

==== On display ====
Cavalier Mustang II

- 68-15795 – Minnesota Air National Guard Museum in Minneapolis, Minnesota.

XP-51

- 41-038 Original XP-51 – EAA AirVenture Museum in Oshkosh, Wisconsin.

P-51A

- 43-6274 (unnamed) – Yanks Air Museum in Chino, California.

P-51C

- 44-10947 Excalibur III – Steven F. Udvar-Hazy Center of the National Air and Space Museum in Chantilly, Virginia.

P-51D

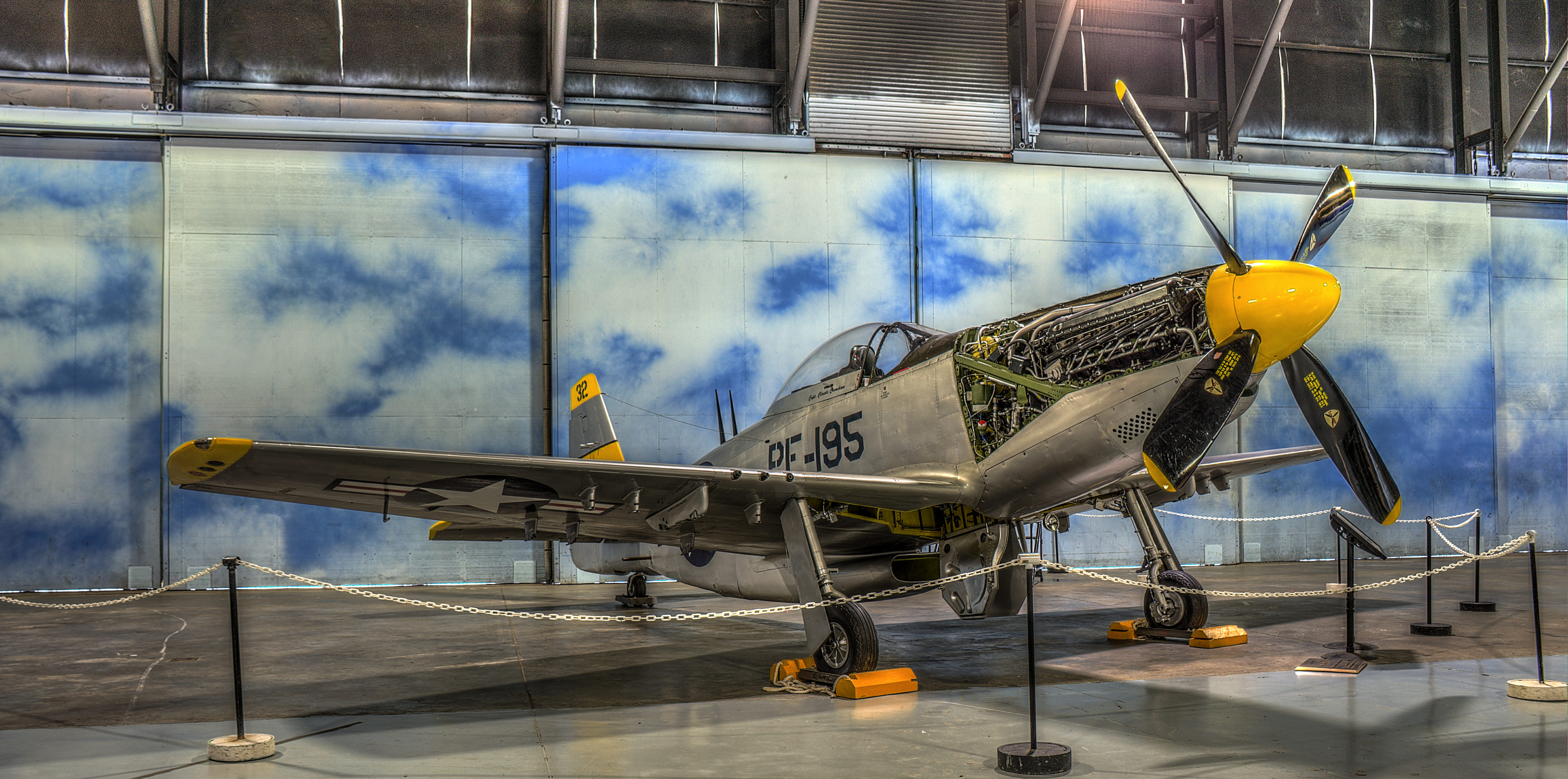
P-51H Louisiana Heatwave on display at the Museum of Aviation, Robins AFB

- serial number unknown Bunnie/Miss Kentucky State – National World War II Museum in New Orleans, Louisiana.
- serial number unknown Feeble Eagle – Museum of Flight in Seattle, Washington.
- serial number unknown – South Carolina Air National Guard Memorial Park, McEntire Air National Guard Station, South Carolina.
- assembled from multiple P-51 hulks/multiple serial numbers; marked as 44-13371 Audrey – Hill Aerospace Museum, Hill AFB, Utah.
- 44-13571 No unique name; painted as post-WW II Eglin Field armament evaluation aircraft- Air Force Armament Museum at Eglin AFB, Florida.
- 44-63272 Bad Angel – Pima Air & Space Museum, adjacent to Davis-Monthan AFB, Tucson, Arizona.
- 44-63615 Bunnie – Seymour Johnson AFB, North Carolina.
- 44-72948 Wham Bam – Charleston ANGB, West Virginia.
- 44-72989 (unnamed) – Volk Field ANGB, Wisconsin.
- 44-73683 Bunnie – San Diego Aerospace Museum in San Diego, California.
- 44-73972 (unnamed) – Fresno ANGB in Fresno, California.
- 44-74216 Derailer – Battleship Memorial Park in Mobile, Alabama.
- 44-74407 (unnamed) – Fargo ANGB/Hector Field in Fargo, North Dakota.
- 44-74910 Miss Judy – Yanks Air Museum in Chino, California.
- 44-74936 Shimmy IV – National Museum of the United States Air Force at Wright-Patterson AFB in Dayton, Ohio.

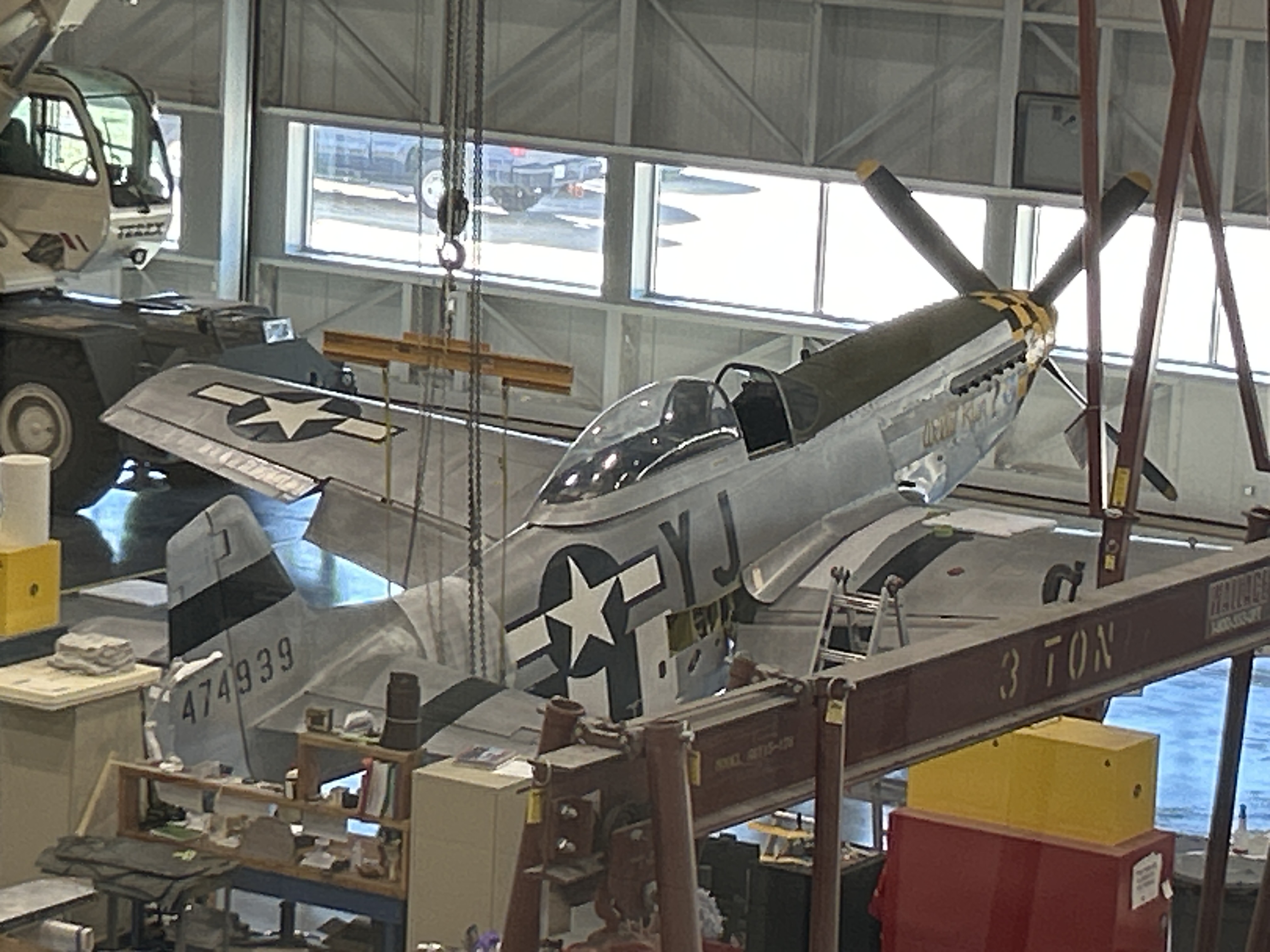
P-51D 44-74939 Willit Run? undergoing maintenance work at the Steven F. Udvar-Hazy Center in Chantilly, Virginia, 3 February 2024

- 44-74939 Willit Run? – National Air and Space Museum in Washington, DC.
- 44-75007 Paul I – EAA AirVenture Museum in Oshkosh, Wisconsin.

P-51H

- 44-64265 Louisiana Heatwave – Museum of Aviation, Robins Air Force Base in Warner Robins, Georgia. Formerly on display at Octave Chanute Aerospace Museum at the former Chanute AFB in Rantoul, Illinois.
- 44-64376 (unnamed) – Lackland AFB in Texas.

P-51K

- 44-12116 Second Fiddle – Crawford Auto-Aviation Museum in Cleveland, Ohio.

==== Under restoration or in storage ====
P-51A

- 43-6178 – in storage at Fantasy of Flight in Polk City, Florida.

P-51C

- 42-103740 – to airworthiness by The Oklahoma Museum of Flying in Oklahoma City, Oklahoma.

P-51D

- 44-63762 – to airworthiness by private owner in Camden, Delaware.
- 44-63791 – to airworthiness by private owner in Pensacola, Florida.
- 44-63889 Queen of Hearts – to airworthiness by private owner in Onalaska, Texas.
- 44-64005 Mary Mine – to airworthiness by private owner.fkis
- 44-72028 – to airworthiness by private owner in Camden, Delaware.
- 44-72059 – to airworthiness by private owner in Wilmington, Delaware.
- 44-72395 – to airworthiness by private owner in Camden, Delaware.
- 44-72400 – for static display by New England Air Museum in Windsor Locks, Connecticut.
- 44-72902 American Dreamer – in storage by private owner in West Hollywood, California.
- 44-72936 – to airworthiness by private owner in Encino, California.
- 44-72990 (unnamed) – in storage at US Army Aviation Museum at Fort Novosel, Alabama.
- 44-73081 – in storage by private owner in Hayward, California.
- 44-73163 – to airworthiness by private owner in Hot Springs, North Carolina.
- 44-73323 – to airworthiness by private owner in Encino, California.
- 44-73350 Archie – in storage by private owner in Belle, Missouri.
- 44-73437 – to airworthiness by private owner in Dover, Delaware.
- 44-73518 Precious Metal – to airworthiness by private owner in Hollywood, Florida.
- 44-74311 RCAF 9577 – in storage by private owner in San Martin, California.
- 44-74469 Red Dog – in storage by private owner in Chandler, Arizona.
- 44-74543 Geraldine – to airworthiness by private owner in Sierra Madre, California.
- 44-74960 – to airworthiness by private owner in Valparaiso, Indiana.
- 44-75024 – to airworthiness by War Eagles Air Museum in Santa Teresa, New Mexico.
- 44-77902 – in storage by private owner in Big Spring, Texas.
- 44-84850 Su Su – to airworthiness by private owner in La Mesa, California.
- 44-84896 – to airworthiness by private owner in Pensacola, Florida.
- 44-84962 – in storage by private owner in New Athens, Illinois.
- 45-11571 – in storage by private owner in Bandon, Oregon.

P-51H

- 44-64375 – to airworthiness by private owner in Blaine, Minnesota.

P-51K

- 44-11807 – to airworthiness by private owner in Fargo, North Dakota.
- 44-12118 – to airworthiness by private owner in Bemidji, Minnesota.
- 44-12140 – in storage by private owner in San Diego, California.

XP-51G

- 43-43335 - long term restoration, in

La Canada California

=== Venezuela ===
On display

P-51D

- 45-11458 – Museo Aeronautico at Maracay Air Force Base.
