= Golden Wings Flying Museum =

- Location within Minnesota
- Location: Blaine, Minnesota
- Coordinates: 45.129°N 93.214°W
- Type: Aviation museum
- Founder: Greg Herrick
- Curator: Craig Schiller
- Website: www.goldenwingsmuseum.com

The Golden Wings Flying Museum was an aviation museum located in Blaine, Minnesota.

== History ==
The museum was founded in 1996 by Greg Herrick in a former University of Minnesota hangar. (Note: Herrick was the founder of Zeos.)

In 1997, Herrick began a campaign to force the Federal Aviation Administration to make the blueprints of historic aircraft available to the public. This led to a lawsuit in 1999 that eventually resulted in the "Herrick Amendment" being passed as part of the FAA Air Transportation Modernization and Safety Improvement Act in 2012. (Note: See also Taylor v. Sturgell.)

Herrick organized a re-creation of the National Air Tour in 2003. Five of his aircraft took part.

The collection was put up for sale in 2015.

== Collection ==
=== Aircraft formerly on display ===
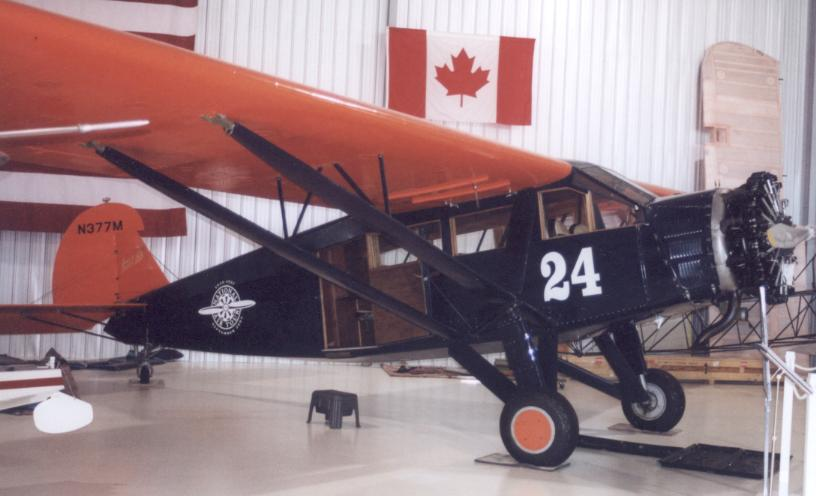
Travel Air 6000

- Aerocar
- Aeronca C-3
- Alliance A-1 Argo
- Arrow Sport M
- Avro Avian
- Boeing Stearman
- Buhl Sport Airsedan
- Bushmaster 2000
- Cunningham-Hall PT-6
- Fairchild FC-2W-2
- Fairchild PT-19A
- Fairchild PT-23
- Fairchild PT-26
- Fairchild PT-26
- Fleetwings Seabird
- Ford 4-AT-A Trimotor
- Interstate S-1A Cadet
- Kreutzer K-5 Air Coach
- Paramount Cabinaire
- Stearman C3B
- Stearman Model 6 Cloudboy
- Stinson SM-6000-A Airliner
- Stinson SM-6000-B Airliner
- Travel Air 6000-A
- Waco CUC-1

=== Aircraft formerly under restoration ===
- Bellanca 31-42 Senior Pacemaker
- Call-Air A-2
- Curtiss Fledgling
- Fairchild 45
- Fairchild 22 C7D
- Fairchild KR-34C
- Frankfort TG-1A
- Keystone-Loening K-84
- Spartan C2-60
- Stinson SM-1 Detroiter
- Stinson SM-7A

== See also ==
- American Wings Air Museum
