= Fagen Fighters WWII Museum =

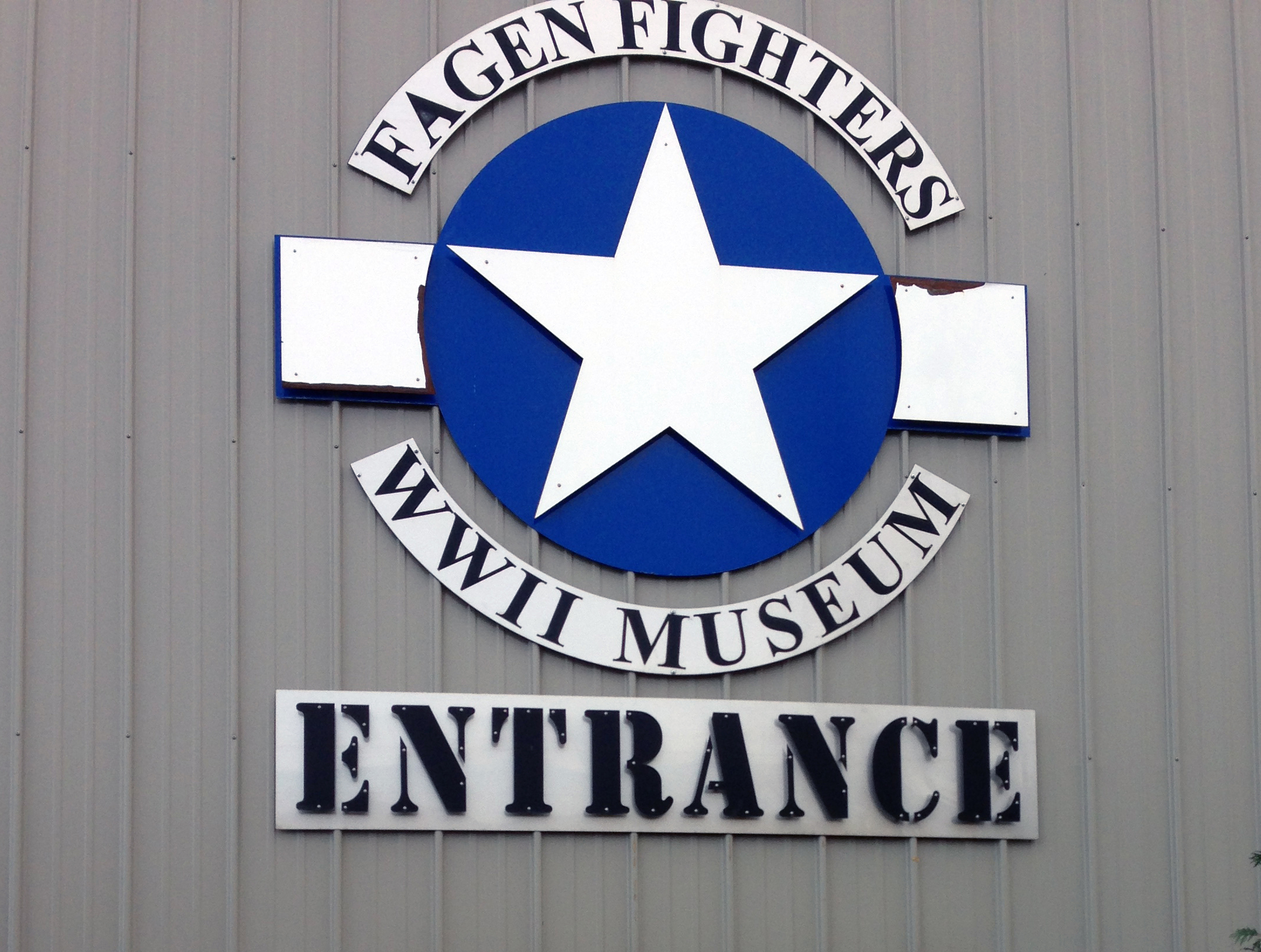

- Location within Minnesota
- Established: 2012
- Location: Granite Falls, Minnesota
- Coordinates: 44.7515°N 95.5580°W
- Type: Military aviation museum
- Founders: Diane Fagen; Ron Fagen
- Website: fagenfighterswwiimuseum.org

The Fagen Fighters WWII Museum is an aviation museum located in Granite Falls, Minnesota.

== History ==
Museum founder Ron Fagen bought his first warbird, a P-51, in 1994. Then, in 1998, he established Fagen Fighters Restoration. However, the museum itself was only founded in 2012.

In May 2016, the museum unveiled a boxcar used in the deportation of Jews during the Holocaust it had acquired from Georgenthal, Germany.

A tornado that struck the airport in July 2016 damaged a number of other buildings, but did not affect the museum.

In 2017, the museum purchased a collection of spare parts that belonged to collector Jay Wisler.

The museum opened a fourth hangar featuring U.S. Navy aircraft in December 2023.

In 2025, the museum acquired an A-24 from the Lone Star Flight Museum. Later that year it acquired a P-39.

== Facilities ==
The museum is made up of four display hangars, a restoration hangar, a reproduction Quonset hut, and a reproduction control tower.

== Collection ==
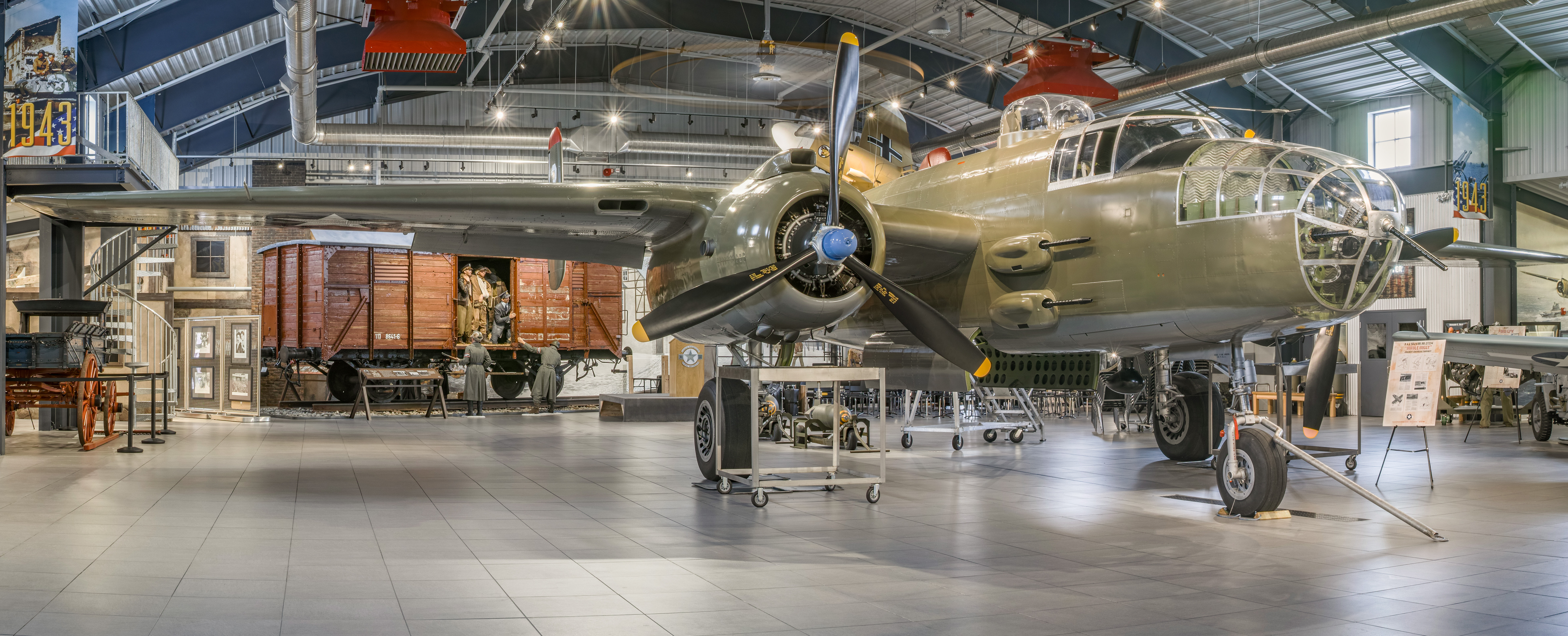
The museum's North American B-25J Mitchell "Paper Doll" with a recovered Holocaust rail car in the background

- Curtiss P-40K Warhawk
- Curtiss SB2C-5 Helldiver
- Eastern FM-2 Wildcat
- Fairchild PT-19A
- Fairchild PT-26A
- Grumman F6F-5 Hellcat
- Lockheed P-38J Lightning
- Mitsubishi A6M3 Zero
- North American B-25J Mitchell
- North American P-51D Mustang
- North American P-51D Mustang
- North American SNJ-4
- Republic P-47D Thunderbolt
- Ryan PT-22 Recruit
- Stinson L-5B Sentinel
- Vultee BT-13 Valiant
- Waco CG-4A

== See also ==
- American Wings Air Museum
- Dakota Territory Air Museum
- Fargo Air Museum
- List of aviation museums
- Wings of the North Air Museum
