= American Wings Air Museum =

- Location within Minnesota
- Established: 1985
- Dissolved: 2009
- Location: Blaine, Minnesota
- Coordinates: 45.1422°N 93.2172°W
- Type: Aviation museum
- Founder: Mike Langer
- Website: americanwings.org (Archived)

The American Wings Air Museum was an aviation museum located at Anoka County–Blaine Airport in Blaine, Minnesota.

== History ==
The American Wings Air Museum was co-founded by Mike Langer in 1985. Due to an increase in rent, the museum was forced to close in 2009.

The museum began disposing of its aircraft in September 2022.

== Collection ==
- Cessna L-19 Bird Dog
- Cessna T-41 Mescalero
- Grumman RV-1D Mohawk
- Grumman S2F-1 Tracker
- LTV TA-7C Corsair II
- Northrop F-5 Tiger II
- Sikorsky UH-34D Seahorse

== See also ==
- Dakota Territory Air Museum
- Fagen Fighters WWII Museum
- Fargo Air Museum
- Golden Wings Flying Museum
- Wings of the North Air Museum
