= Wings of the North Air Museum =

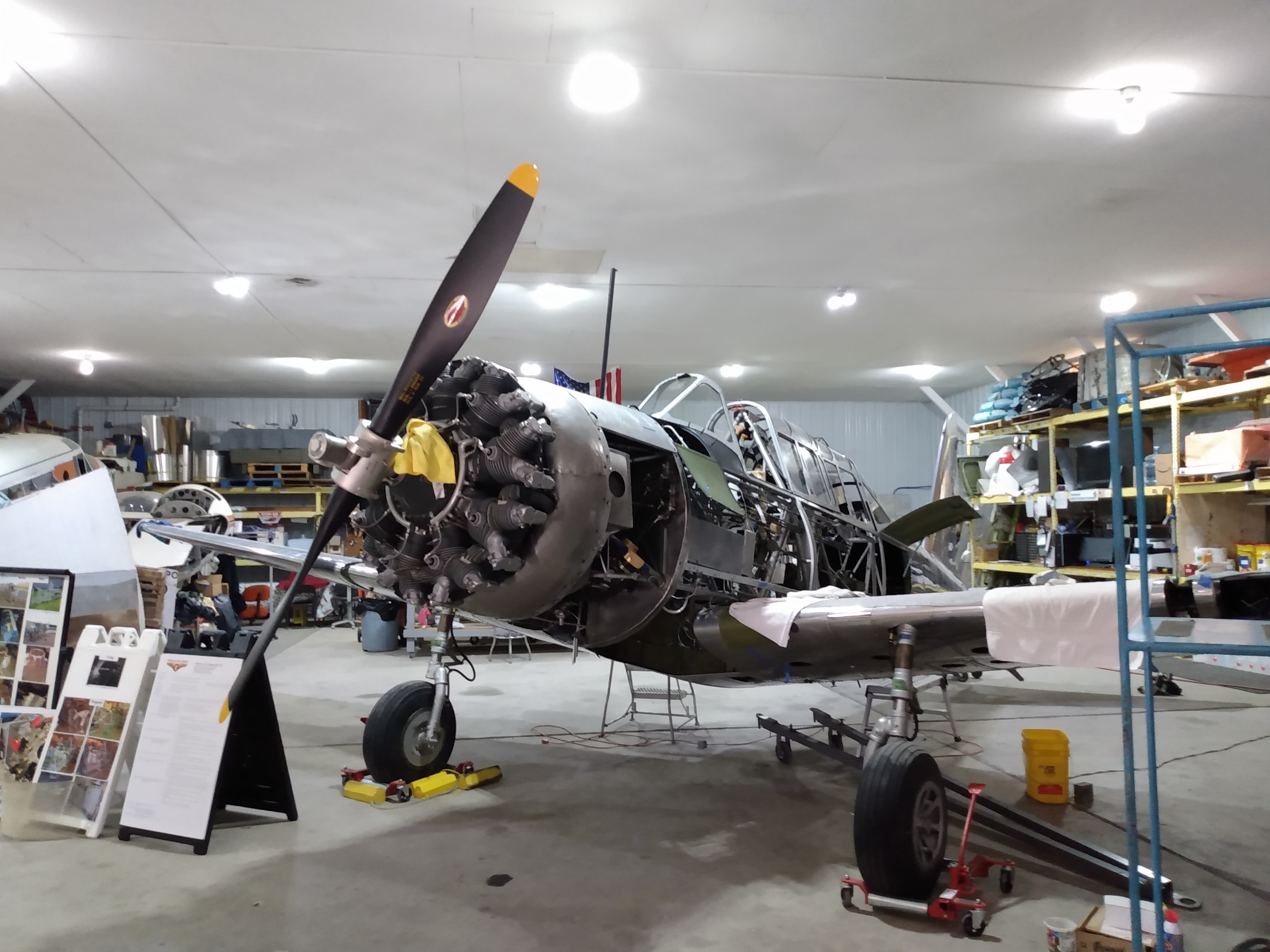

- Location within Minnesota
- Established: February 1998
- Location: Eden Prairie, Minnesota
- Coordinates: 44.8210°N 93.4573°W
- Type: Aviation museum
- President: Jack Larsen
- Website: wotn.org

The Wings of the North Air Museum is an aviation museum located at Flying Cloud Airport in Eden Prairie, Minnesota.

== History ==
The Wings of the North foundation was established in February 1998 after the Planes of Fame East Museum closed. Two months later, the group organized an airshow. Eventually named AirExpo, it was continued for 18 years despite lacking a permanent location. Although not used for display, the museum purchased Hangar 72D at Flying Cloud Airport for restoration and maintenance in December 2012. On 15 October 2016, a museum was opened on the south side of the airport, near the control tower. Later that year, it added a B-25 and P-40 to its collection. In 2021 the museum lost its lease to the facility. The museum reopened in a smaller hangar in the northwest corner of the airport on 9 September 2023.

== Collection ==
- Beechcraft AT-11 Kansan
- Boeing N2S-1
- Cessna L-19A Bird Dog
- Vultee BT-15 Valiant

== See also ==
- American Wings Air Museum
- Dakota Territory Air Museum
- Fagen Fighters WWII Museum
- Fargo Air Museum
