= Fargo Air Museum =

Coordinates: 46°54′21″N 96°48′15″W

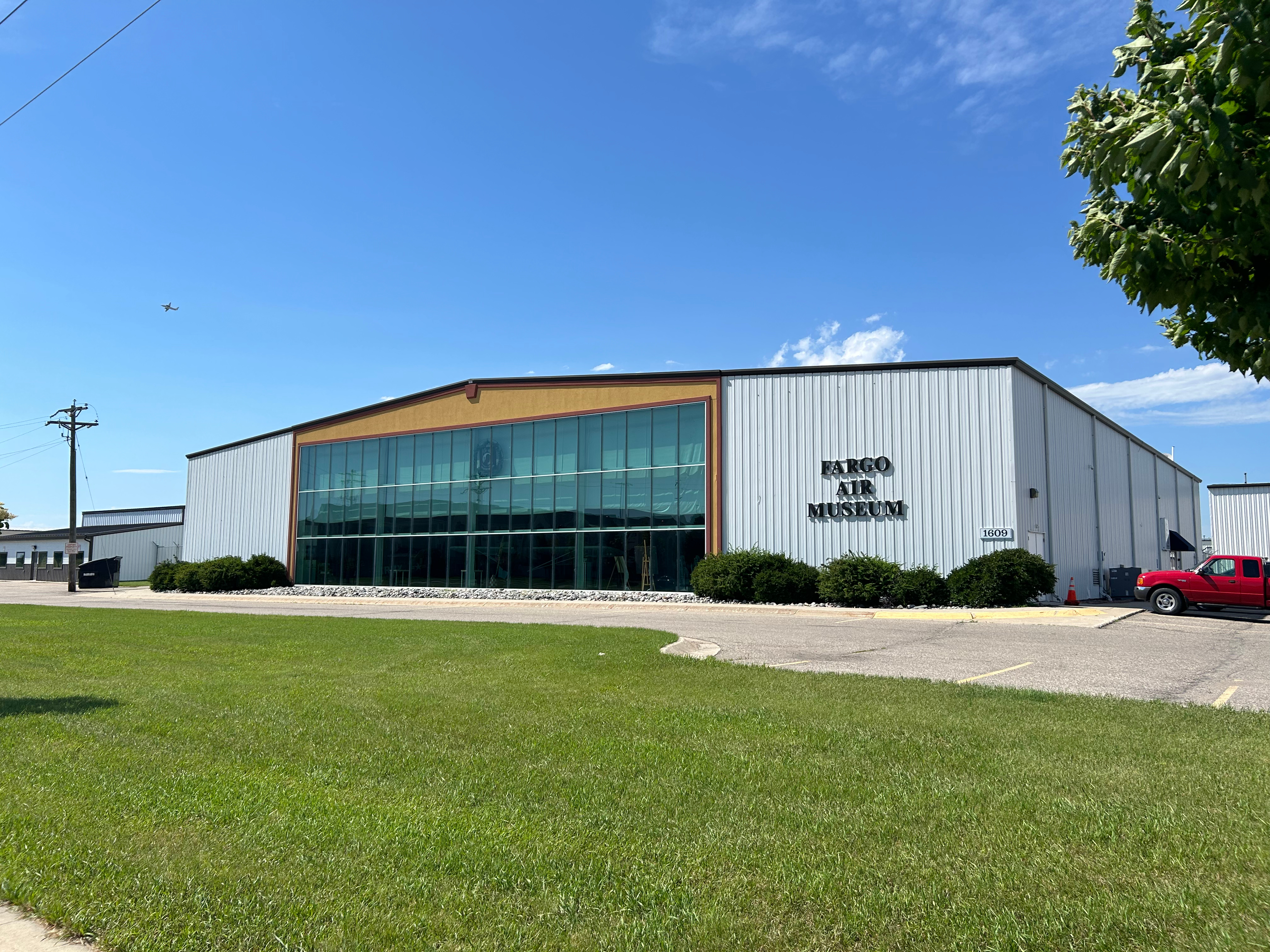
- Museum exterior
- Established: 2001
- Location: 1609 19th Ave N, Fargo, North Dakota 58102
- Type: Aviation museum
- Founders: Gerry Beck; Bob Odegaard; Major General Darrol Schroeder; Richard Harris Walstad
- Website: fargoairmuseum.org

The Fargo Air Museum is an aviation related museum in Fargo, North Dakota. It is located at Hector International Airport in the northern part of the city. The museum includes many historic aircraft of which 90% are in flying condition.

== History ==
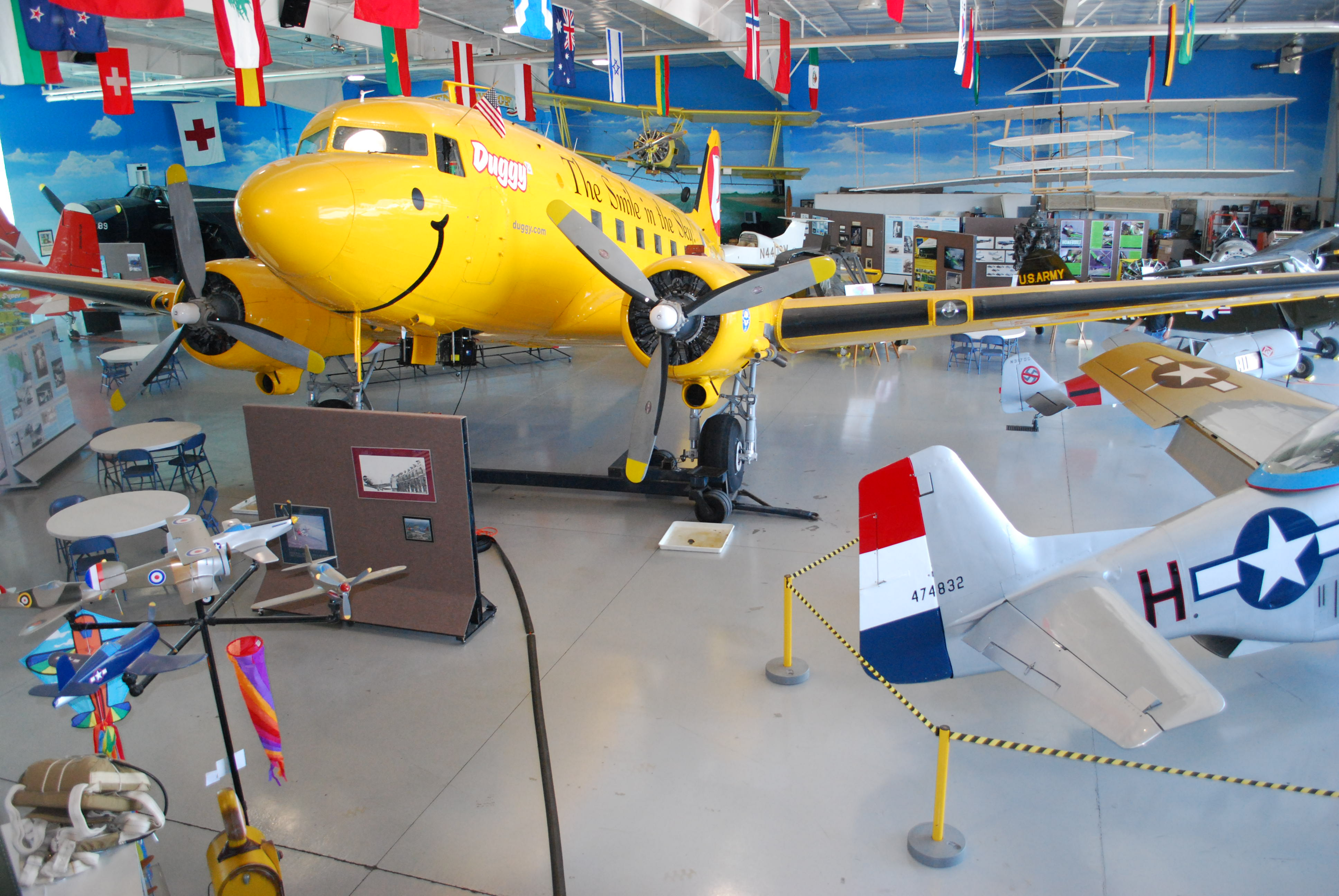
The inside of the Fargo Air Museum, 2008

The museum broke ground on a Beck-Odegaard Wing in August 2013. In 2016, the museum acquired a 1944 tractor that served as an aircraft tug at Naval Air Station Atlantic City during World War II.

The museum announced a partnership with North Dakota State University Archives in April 2022 to help preserve the museum's archives.

The museum opened a new exhibit about the early years of the North Dakota Air National Guard in January 2024.

An F-86H arrived at the museum in September 2024.

The museum opened new exhibits about World War I and the Blue Angels in August 2025.

== Aircraft on display ==
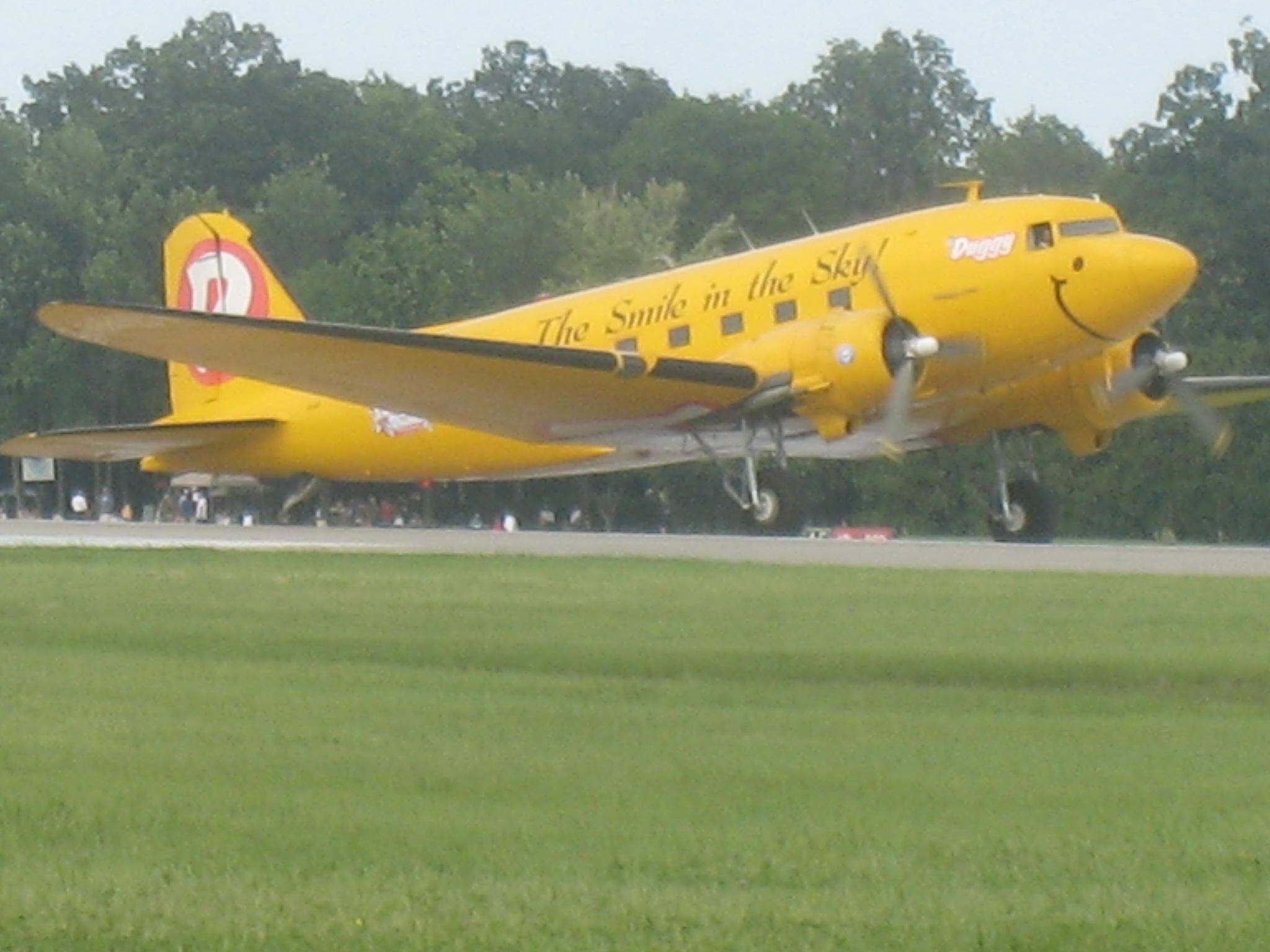
Photo of the Douglas DC-3 that is on display at the Fargo Air Museum.

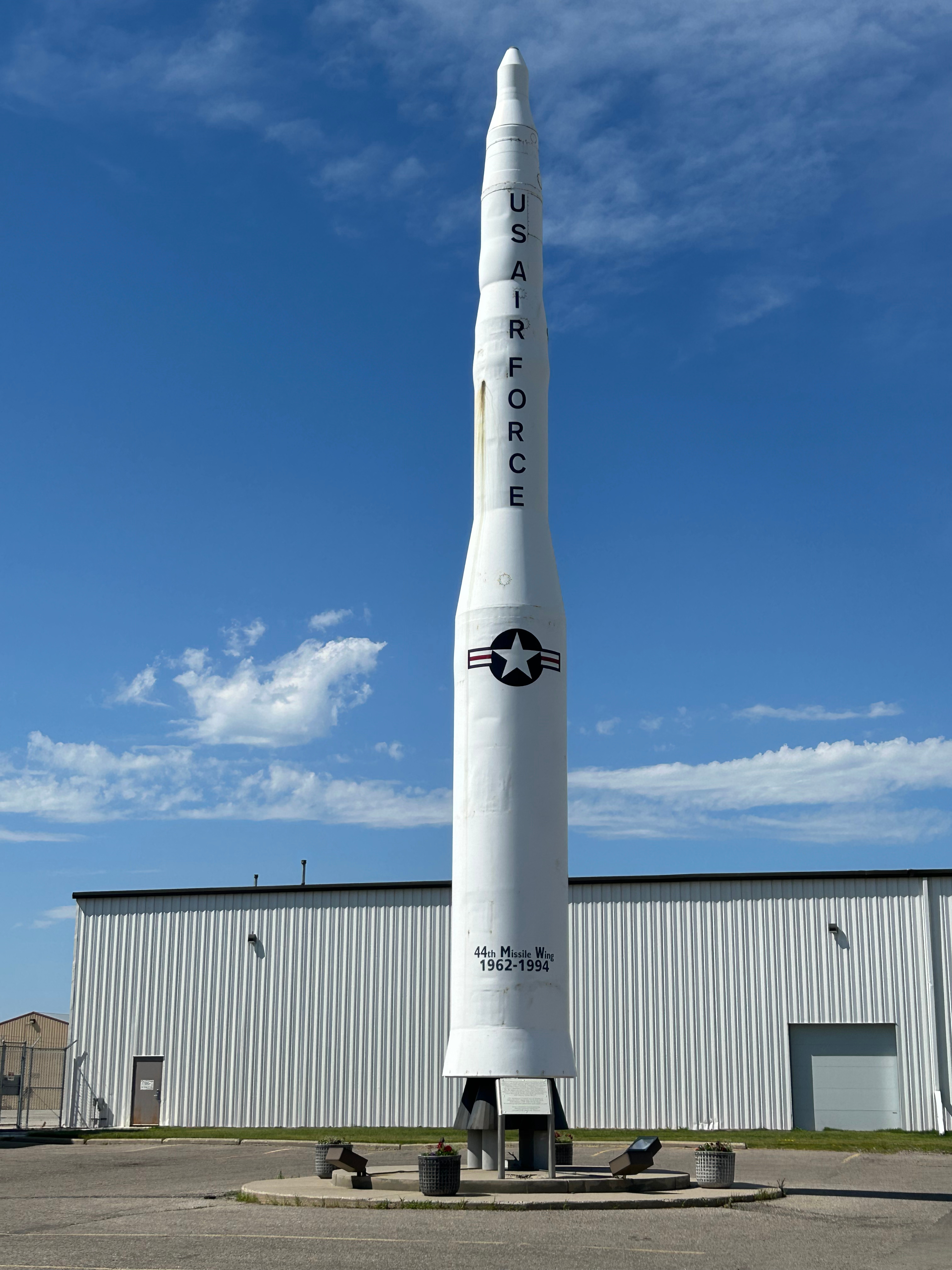
U.S. Air Force 44th Missile Wing missile on display outside the Fargo Air Museum.

=== Airworthy aircraft ===
- Aero L-39 Albatros
- Cessna O-1 Bird Dog
- Douglas DC-3 "Duggy"
- Fairchild PT-19
- Focke-Wulf Fw 190 – Half-scale model
- Lancair 360
- Meyer's Little Toot
- North American Harvard Mk IV
- North American P-51D Mustang
- Piper J-3 Cub
- Piper PA-46-350P Malibu Mirage
- Rearwin Skyranger
- Rutan Long-EZ
- Schleicher K7
- Taylorcraft L-2
- Velocity SE-FG

=== Static display aircraft ===
- Bell UH-1 Iroquois
- General Atomics MQ-1 Predator
- McDonnell F-101B Voodoo
- North American B-25 Mitchell – Under restoration
- Northrop Grumman RQ-4 Global Hawk – 1:1 Scale Model
- Pitts Special
- PZL TS-11 Iskra
- Standard J-1
- Vultee BT-13 Valiant – Under restoration
- Wright Flyer – Replica

== See also ==
- American Wings Air Museum
- Dakota Territory Air Museum
- Fagen Fighters WWII Museum
- Wings of the North Air Museum
- List of aviation museums
