= Dakota Territory Air Museum =

American aviation museum

- Location within North Dakota
- Established: 1986
- Location: Minot, North Dakota
- Coordinates: 48°16′18″N 101°17′22″W
- Type: Aviation museum
- Founders: Don Larson, Al Pietsch, and Warren Pietsch
- Director: Jenna Grindberg
- President: Larry Linrud
- Website: dakotaterritoryairmuseum.com

The Dakota Territory Air Museum is an aviation museum on North Hill in Minot, North Dakota near Minot International Airport. The mission of the Dakota Territory Air Museum is to be a historical aviation resource honoring the men, women and machines that have impacted the rich history of aviation through displays and events that educate, inspire and entertain people of all ages.

== History ==
The museum was founded in 1986 and the first museum building was built in 1988. Additions were added in 1990 and 1991. A new hangar, for the aircraft from the Texas Flying Legends Museum, was built in 2013.

The museum has held an annual sweepstakes since 1997 in which it gives away a light airplane.

In a cooperative venture with the Texas Flying Legends Museum in Houston, each spring, the collection of World War II warbirds was flown from Texas to the Dakota Territory Air Museum where they were typically on display from mid-May through July. When TFLM ceased operating in 2019, the aircraft from their collection were permanently moved to DTAM.

From 2014 to no later than May 2023, the museum hosted the Magic City Discovery Center, a children's museum, while it searched for a permanent location.

== Facilities ==
The museum consists of a main information room, outdoor displays, a restoration hangar, the Scott Nelson Gallery, the Texas Flying Legends hangar, Wright Flyer Hangar and the Oswin H. Elker Hangar.

== Collection ==
This is a partial list of airplanes on display at the museum. Displays change often as planes do go to air shows or other museums occasionally.

Military

- Convair QF-106A Delta Dart
- Douglas C-47A Skytrain
- Lockheed T-33A
- LTV A-7 Corsair II
- McDonnell Douglas F-15A Eagle

Owned by the Texas Flying Legends Museum

- Canadian Car and Foundry Harvard IV
- Curtiss P-40E Warhawk
- Curtiss P-40 Warhawk – under restoration to static display
- Douglas C-53 Skytrooper
- General Motors FM-2 Wildcat
- Interstate L-6 Cadet
- North American B-25J Mitchell Betty's Dream
- North American P-51C Mustang Lopes Hope 3rd
- North American P-51D Mustang Little Horse
- North American P-51D Mustang Dakota Kid II
- Supermarine Spitfire IXc Half Stork
- Goodyear FG-1D Corsair Whistling Death

Civilian

- Aeronca 7 Champion
- Arrow Model F
- Arrow Sport
- Beechcraft Expeditor 3NM
- Callair A-3
- Cessna 170
- Cessna 185
- Cessna 195
- Cessna T-50
- Christen Eagle II
- Curtiss Model D – replica
- Erco Ercoupe
- Evans VP-1 Volksplane
- Fairchild 24 C8C
- Garnet Even
- Hall Cherokee II
- Kaminskas Jungster I
- Learjet 24B
- Luscombe 8A
- Monocoupe 110
- Monocoupe 110 Special
- Mooney M20
- Piel Emeraude
- Pietenpol Aircamper
- Piper J-3 Cub
- Piper J-3 Cub
- RLU-1 Breezy
- Rotec Rally 2B
- RotorWay Exec
- Rutan VariEze
- Schweizer SGS 1-36 Sprite
- Stinson SR-5A Reliant
- Stolp Starduster Too
- Taylor J-2
- Taylorcraft BC-12D
- Taylorcraft GJ
- Wright Flyer – replica
- Waco GXE
- Waco QCF-2
- Waco UPF-7
- Waco VPF-7
- Wolf W-11 Boredom Fighter

== See also ==
- American Wings Air Museum
- Fagen Fighters WWII Museum
- Fargo Air Museum
- Wings of the North Air Museum
