= Maine Air Museum =

Aviation museum located at Bangor International Airport in Bangor, Maine

- Location within Maine
- Established: 1997
- Location: Bangor, Maine
- Coordinates: 44.8006°N 68.8100°W
- Type: Aviation museum
- Founder: Francis L. Boyle Jr.
- Website: www.maineairmuseum.com

The Maine Air Museum is an aviation museum located at Bangor International Airport in Bangor, Maine.

== History ==
The Maine Aviation Historical Society was founded in 1967 and reformed in 1990. The society began monthly discussions with the city of Bangor in 1997 and two years later took possession of a building at the airport. This was followed one month later by the acquisition of a Stinson 10A from the Quonset Air Museum. After several years of work, the Maine Air Museum held its grand opening on 14 June 2003.

In 2007, the museum opened new exhibits about aerial firefighting during the 1947 fires on Mount Desert Island and aerial navigation in World War II. It received a number of new exhibits in 2010, including two about the physics of flight and a rotating beacon that had been used at Bangor International Airport. The next year, it acquired the engine and propeller of the NC-4, the first airplane to cross the Atlantic Ocean. (Note: The parts had been removed when it was being repaired after a hangar fire.)

== Facilities ==
The museum is located in Building 98, a 7,000 sq ft (650 m^{2}) concrete structure with 11 ft (3.4 m) thick walls which was built in 1958 to assemble air-to-air missiles as part of Dow Air Force Base. A platform for viewing aircraft taking off and landing at the airport is attached to the side of the building.

== Exhibits ==
Exhibits at the museum include the airlines of Maine, military crash sites in the state, the disappearance of L'Oiseau Blanc and a 1920s aircraft mechanic's workshop. Another set of displays explain aerodynamic principles.

== Collection ==
=== Aircraft ===
- Bell UH-1H Iroquois
- Luscombe 8A
- RotorWay Scorpion
- Stinson 10A

=== Ground vehicles ===
- 1944 International crash truck

=== Other ===
- Link Trainer
- Pratt & Whitney J57
