= Hickory Aviation Museum =

- Location in North Carolina
- Established: 19 May 2007
- Location: Hickory, North Carolina, United States
- Coordinates: 35.742214°N 81.389360°W
- Type: Aviation museum
- Founders: Phil Hazel; Kregg Kirby; Kyle Kirby; Jim Trexler
- President: Jeff Wofford
- Curator: Kyle Kirby
- Website: hickoryaviationmuseum.org

Hickory Aviation Museum is an aviation museum at the Hickory Regional Airport in Hickory, North Carolina. It features a museum located in the former airport terminal with artifacts, a hangar with aircraft and outdoor exhibits of aircraft on the former airport ramp.

== History ==
The museum originated from the Sabre Society, which was formed in 1991 to restore a North American FJ-3 Fury on display at a ballpark in Taylorsville, North Carolina. From 1993 to 2004 the society hosted an airshow at the airport. The museum, co-founded by Kyle and Kregg Kirby, Jim Trexler and Phil Hazel, opened to the public on 19 May 2007.

In 2021, the museum announced it would receive an F4F on loan from the National Naval Aviation Museum.

In 2022, plans were announced for a new building located at Hickory Regional Airport. In addition to housing the museum's aircraft, it will also serve as a training facility for the Catawba Valley Community College. The new facility will cost a total of $22 Million, with $15 Million appropriated from the state budget and the remaining $7 Million from museum fundraising. Stipulations of the plan include relinquishing the spot the museum has within the commercial terminal should commercial operations return to Hickory Regional Airport. The museum broke ground on the new building on 26 October 2023.

The museum has received a number of aircraft on loan from the National Naval Aviation Museum, including a NU-1B in January 2024. This trend continued with the arrival of an AV-8B in July of that year. By July 2025, the museum had begun moving aircraft into the new 53,000 sq ft (4,900 m^{2}) structure. The new location opened on 16 May 2026.

== Collection ==
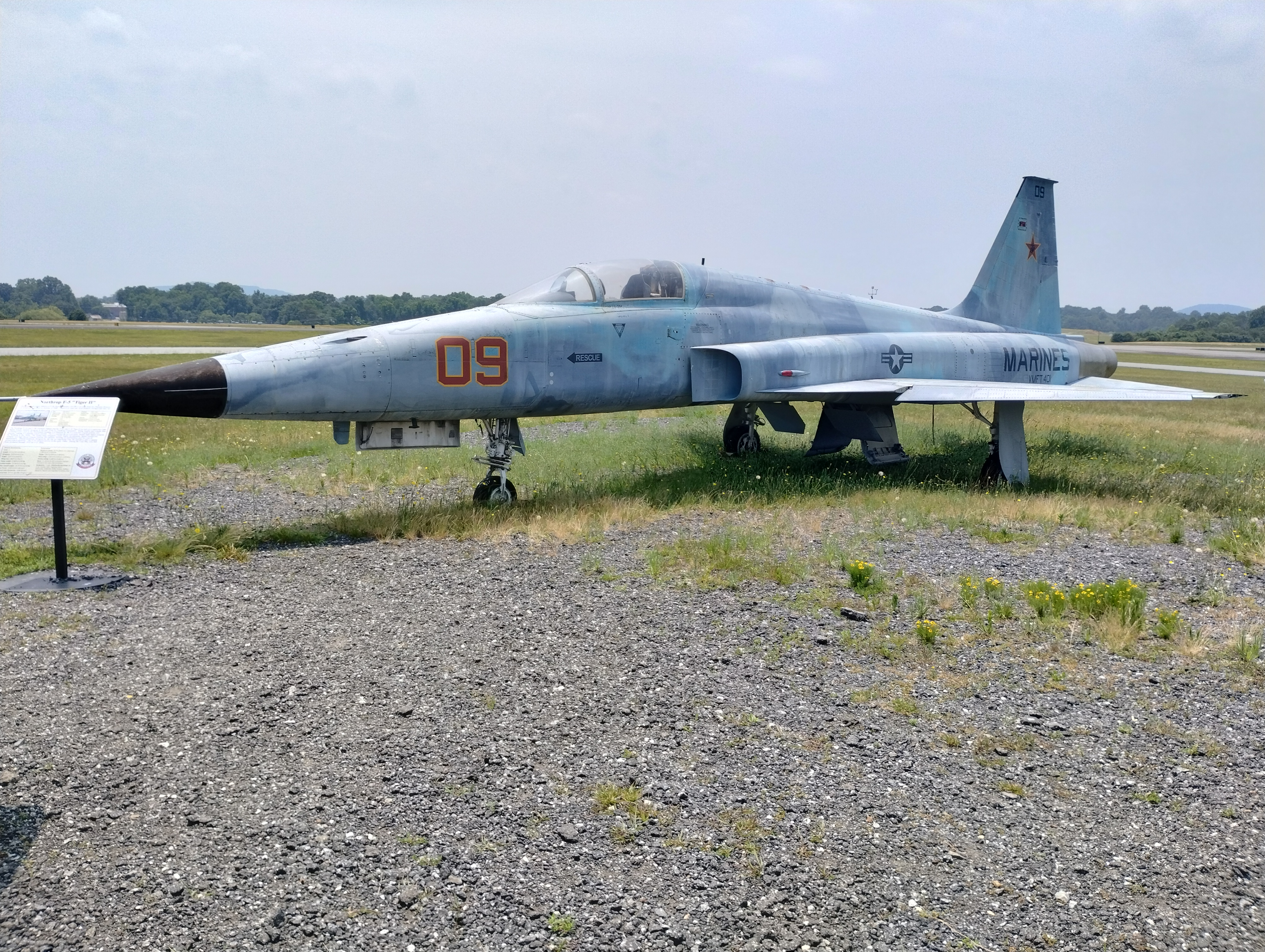
Northrop F-5E Tiger II

- Beechcraft T-34C Turbo Mentor
- Bell AH-1W SuperCobra
- Curtiss XF15C-1
- de Havilland Vampire
- Douglas A-4L Skyhawk
- Grumman A-6E Intruder
- Eastern FM-2 Wildcat
- Grumman F-9 Cougar
- Grumman F-14A Tomcat – cockpit
- Grumman F-14D Tomcat
- Grumman OV-1D Mohawk
- Gyrodyne YRON-1 Rotorcycle
- Hispano HA-200 Saeta
- Lockheed P-3C Orion
- Lockheed T-33A
- LTV A-7A Corsair II
- McDonnell F-101 Voodoo
- McDonnell Douglas AV-8B Harrier II
- McDonnell Douglas F-4B Phantom II
- McDonnell Douglas F/A-18A Hornet
- North American FJ-3M Fury
- North American T-2 Buckeye
- Northrop F-5E Tiger II
- Northrop Grumman EA-6B Prowler
- Republic F-105B Thunderchief
- Sikorsky SH-3H Sea King

== See also ==
- Carolinas Aviation Museum
- North Carolina Aviation Museum
- List of aerospace museums
