= Sikorsky SH-3 Sea King =

American anti-submarine helicopter

SH-3 Sea King
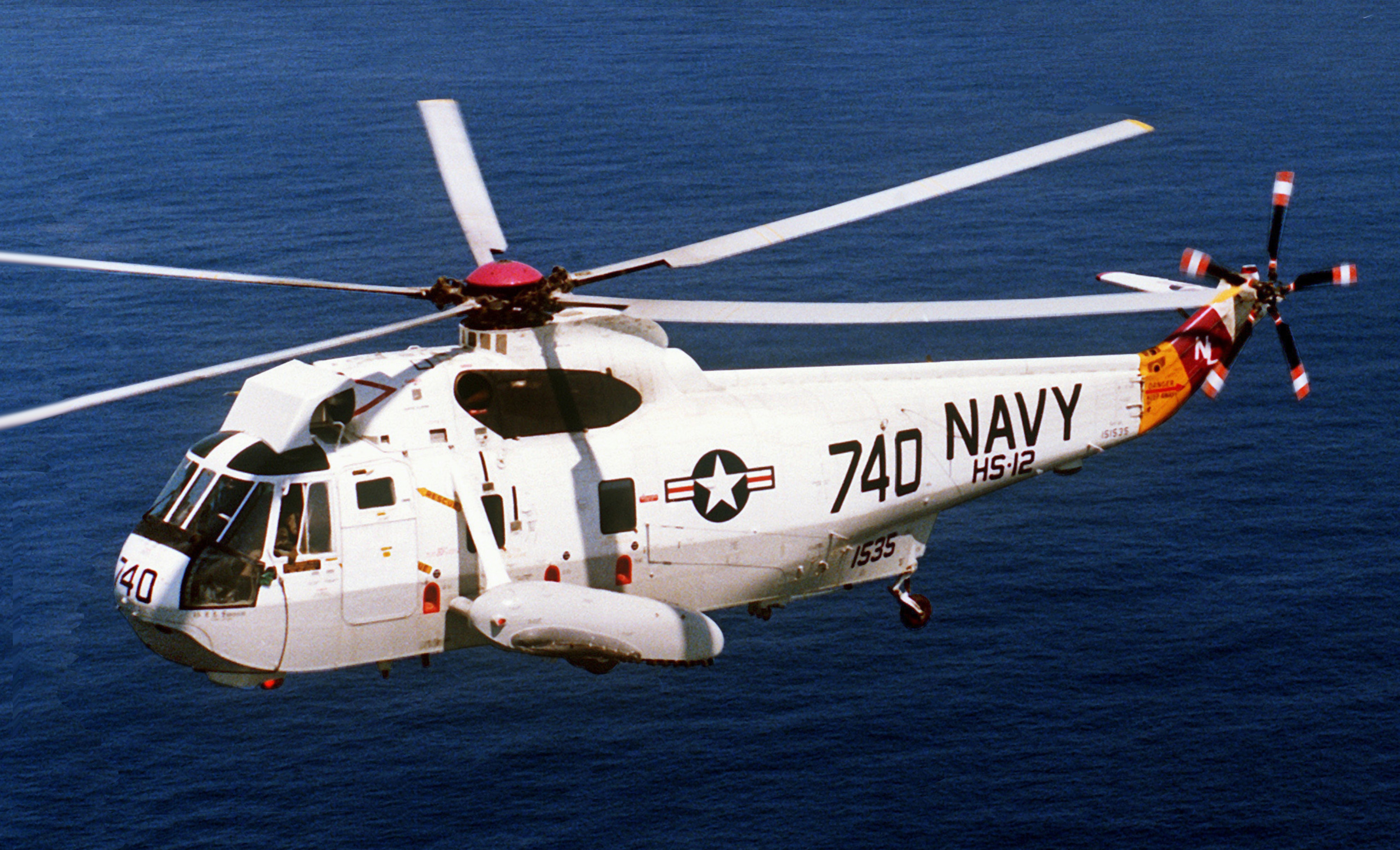
- A U.S. Navy SH-3H Sea King

General information
- Type: Anti-submarine warfare, search and rescue, transport and utility helicopter
- National origin: United States
- Manufacturer: Sikorsky Aircraft
- Status: In service
- Primary users: United States Navy (historical) Italian Navy (historical); Brazilian Navy (historical); Argentine Naval Aviation
- Number built: 1,300+

History
- Manufactured: 1959–1970s
- Introduction date: 1961
- First flight: 11 March 1959
- Retired: Retired by United States Navy in 2006
- Variants: Sikorsky S-61L/N; Sikorsky CH-124 Sea King; Westland Sea King
- Developed into: Sikorsky S-61R; Sikorsky S-67 Blackhawk

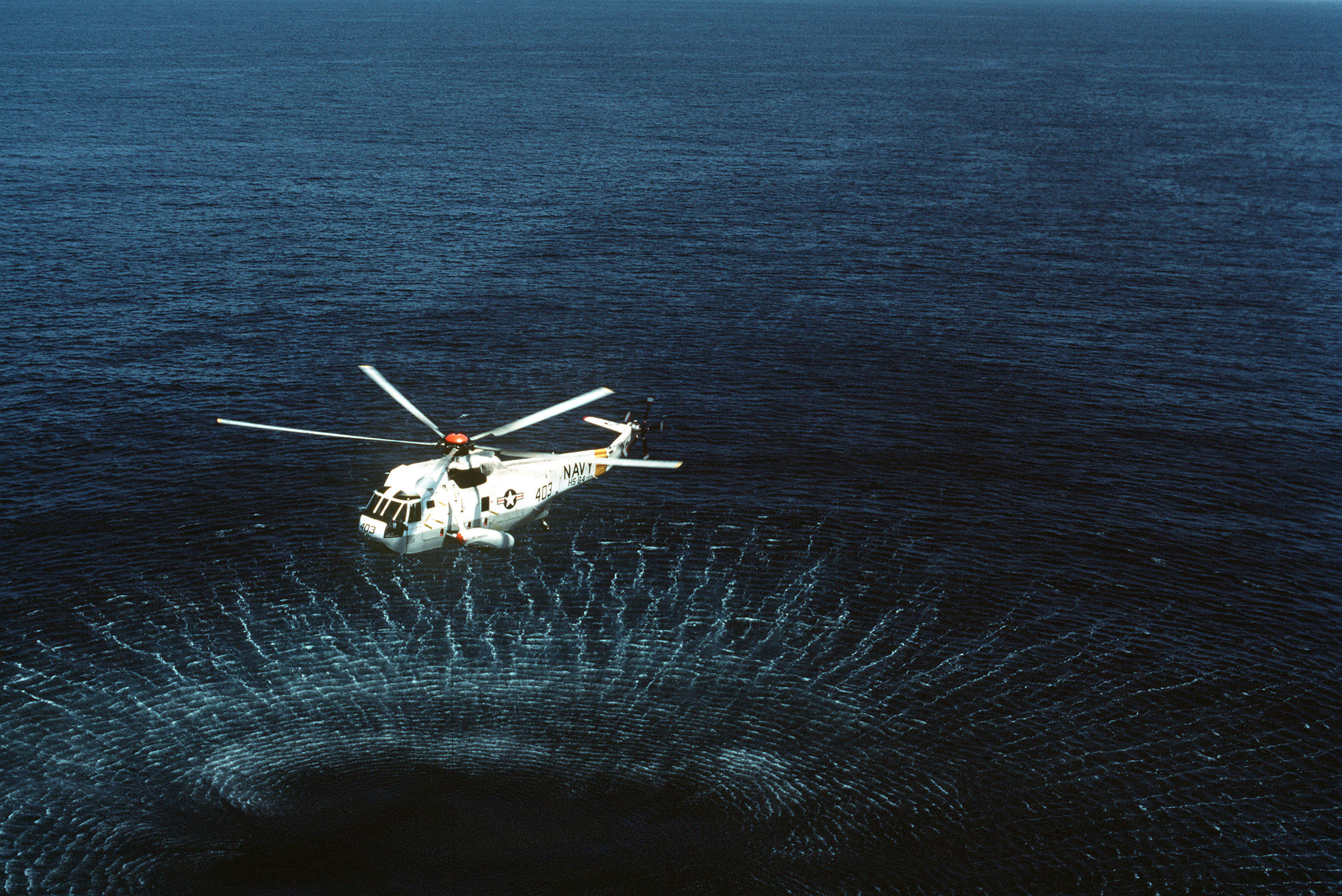
SH-3 Sea King dipping a sonar, 1983

The Sikorsky SH-3 Sea King (company designation S-61) is an American twin-engine anti-submarine warfare (ASW) helicopter designed and built by Sikorsky Aircraft. A landmark design, it was one of the first ASW rotorcraft to use turboshaft engines.

The Sea King has its origins in efforts by the United States Navy to counter the growing threat of Soviet submarines during the 1950s. Accordingly, the helicopter was specifically developed to deliver a capable ASW platform; in particular, it combined the roles of hunter and killer, which had previously been carried out by two separate helicopters. The Sea King was initially designated HSS-2, which was intended to imply a level of commonality to the earlier HSS-1; it was subsequently redesignated as the SH-3A during the early 1960s.

Introduced to service in 1961, it was operated by the United States Navy as a key ASW and utility asset for several decades prior to being replaced by the non-amphibious Sikorsky SH-60 Seahawk in the 1990s. In late 1961 and early 1962, a modified U.S. Navy HSS-2 Sea King was used to break the FAI 3 km, 100 km, 500 km, and 1000 km helicopter speed records. The Sea King also performed various other roles and missions such as search-and-rescue, transport, anti-shipping, medevac, plane guard, and airborne early warning operations.

The Sea King has also proved to be popular on the export market with foreign military customers, and has also been sold to civil operators as well. As of 2024, many examples of the type remain in service in nations around the world, although some major users have begun to retire the type. The Sea King has been built under license by Agusta in Italy, Mitsubishi in Japan, Canada by United Aircraft of Canada, and by Westland in the United Kingdom as the Westland Sea King. The major civil versions are the S-61L and S-61N. The S-61R was another important variant, which was the CH-3C/E Sea King, used by the U.S. Coast Guard as the HH-3F Pelican, and the Air Force's HH-3E Jolly Green Giant; this version had a ramp at the rear among other changes.

== Development ==
=== Origins ===
During the Cold War, the Soviet Navy built up a large and varied fleet of submarines which at one point was in excess of 200 operational submarines. The US Navy countered this threat by the improvement and development of various anti-submarine warfare (ASW) capabilities, which resulted in the development of the Sea King. During the late 1950s, the US Navy took advantage of recent aerospace advances, such as the turboshaft engine, by commissioning the development of a new large naval helicopter. Sikorsky received a request from the service to design a new turbine-powered helicopter that would be capable of performing the ASW mission. The specification included a dipping sonar, mission endurance of four hours, and the ability to support a weapons load of 380 kg (840 lb).

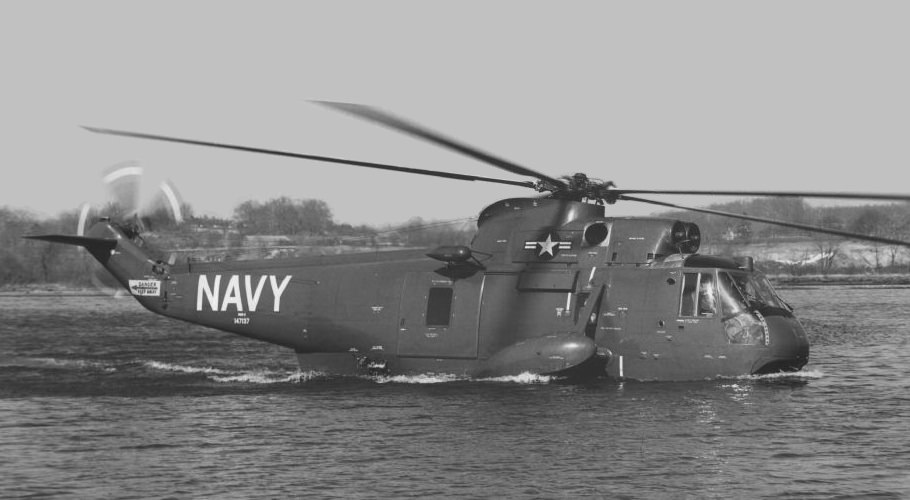
XHSS-2 Sea King prototype

In 1957, Sikorsky was awarded a contract to produce an all-weather amphibious helicopter for the US Navy. As per the earlier specification, this new rotorcraft was to excel at ASW; specifically, it would combine the roles of hunter and killer, as these two duties had previously been carried out by two separate helicopters. It was also the first helicopter to be procured under the US Navy's new weapon system concept, under which Sikorsky was responsible not only for the design and production of the airframe, but all major onboard systems, such as the sonar, navigational equipment, electronic devices, and support equipment. As such, the navigation suite for the rotorcraft was developed jointly by Sikorsky and the US Navy.

Key features of the emerging ASW helicopter included its amphibious hull, which enabled the rotorcraft to readily perform water landings, and its adoption of a twin-turboshaft engine arrangement that enabled it to be larger, heavier and better-equipped than had been possible with prior helicopters. The designation HSS-2 was applied, allegedly to imply a level of commonality to the earlier HSS-1, should political sentiment turn against the development of an entirely new rotorcraft. A total of ten prototypes were produced to support the development program.

=== Into flight ===
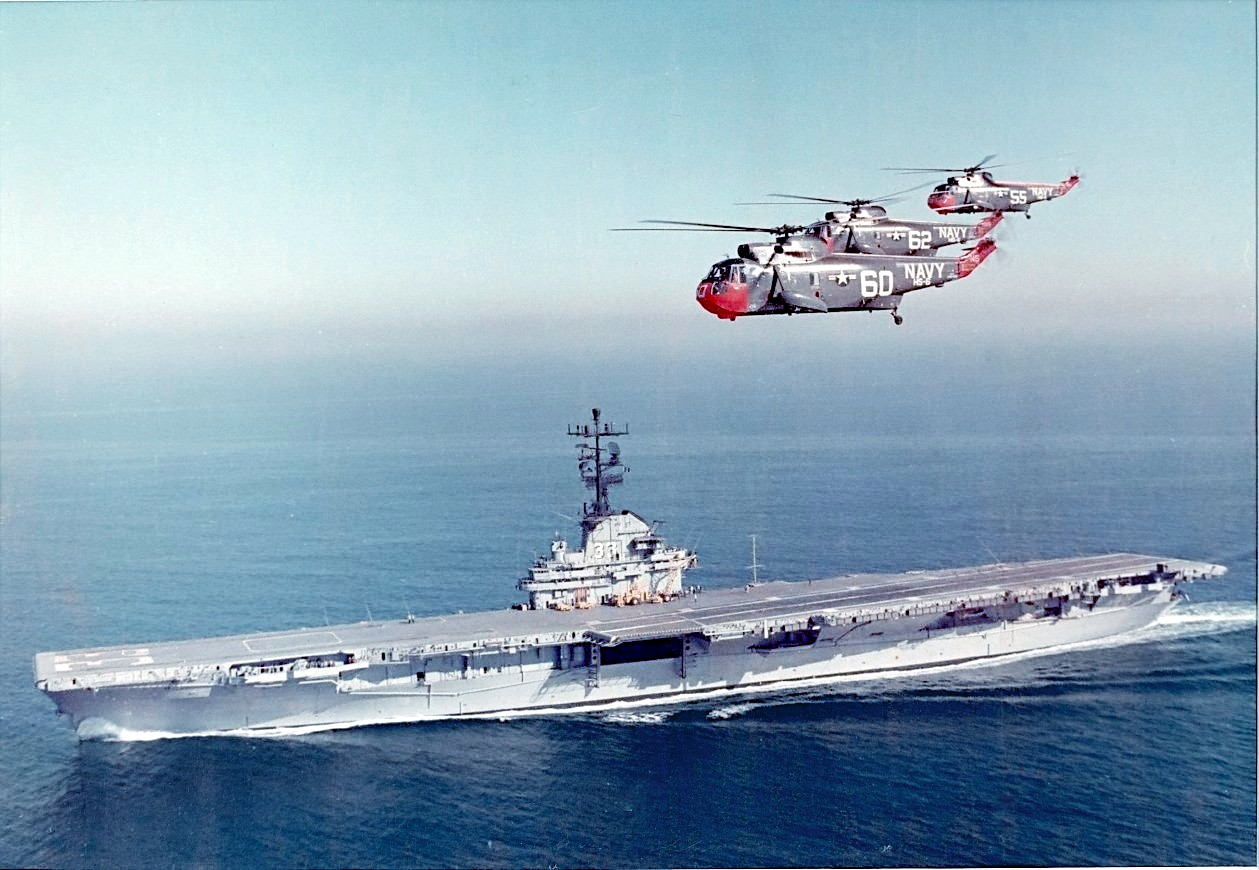
SH-3As of HS-6 above Kearsarge in the early 1960s

On 11 March 1959, the first prototype conducted its maiden flight. During early 1961, a pair of prototypes were stationed on board the aircraft carrier Lake Champlain to fulfill a demand for carrier suitability trials. These trials, which involved testing the folding mechanism of the main rotor blades and a series of takeoffs performed during winds of up to 50 mph (80 km/h), were completed successfully in mid-1961. Shortly after the completion of suitability trials, the US Navy formally accepted delivery of the first HSS-2 rotorcraft, which was subsequently re-designated as the SH-3A, in September 1961.

In late 1961 and early 1962, a modified US Navy HSS-2 Sea King was used to break the FAI 3 km, 100 km, 500 km and 1000 km helicopter speed records. This series of flights culminated on 5 February 1962 with the HSS-2 setting an absolute helicopter speed record of 210.6 mph (338.9 km/h). This record was broken by a modified French Sud-Aviation Super Frelon helicopter on 23 July 1963 with a speed of 217.77 mph (350.47 km/h).

=== Further developments ===
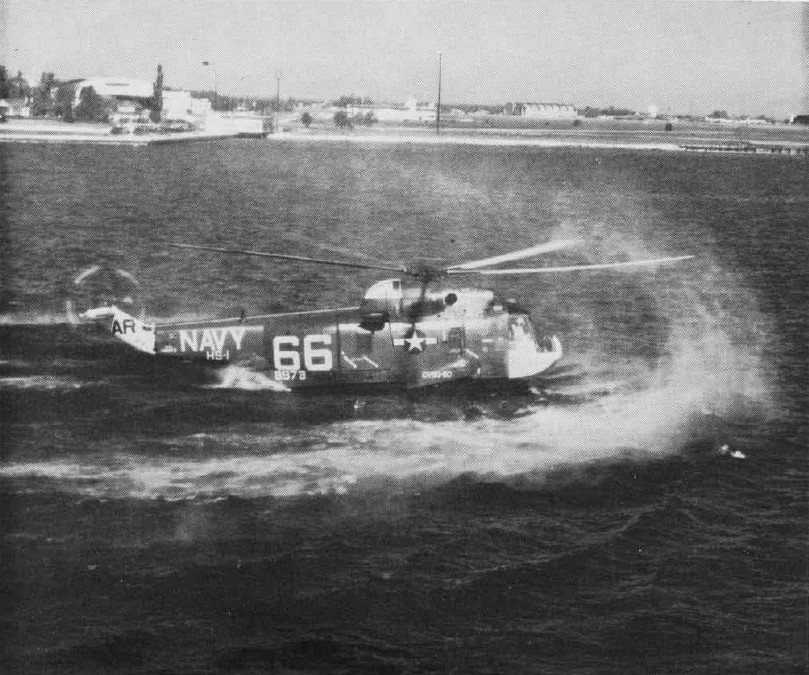
SH-3A landing on the sea in 1964

The base design of the Sea King had proved sound and several aspects were judged to be potentially useful for other operators, and Sikorsky elected to pursue the further development of the rotorcraft for other markets beyond the US Navy. One of the major variants of the Sea King to be produced was a model for civil operators, which was designated as the Sikorsky S-61L. The first operator of the S-61L was Los Angeles Airways, who introduced the type to service on 11 March 1962. Another noteworthy Sea King variant, the significant change this time being the adoption of a conventional fuselage, the Sikorsky S-61R, was also concurrently developed for transport and search and rescue (SAR) duties, this type being extensively operated by the U.S. Air Force and the U.S. Coast Guard.

In U.S. Navy service, the initial SH-3A model of the Sea King would be progressively converted into the improved SH-3D and SH-3H variants; these featured more powerful engines and improved sensors that gave the type greater operational capabilities as an ASW platform. It was also common for Sea Kings to be converted for non-ASW activities, these roles included minesweeping, combat search and rescue, and as a cargo/passenger utility transport. The aircrew on ASW-tasked Sea Kings were routinely trained to carry out these secondary roles as aircraft could often be quickly adapted to perform different missions in the face of operational needs.

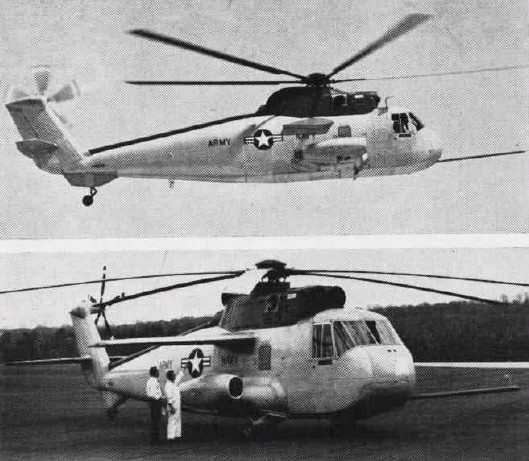
The NH-3A prototype, which tested outfitting a Sea King with fixed wings and jet engines

The NH-3A (S-61F) was an experimental high-speed compound helicopter based on the Sea King tested in the 1960s. Later modified with a tail rotor able to rotate 90° to serve as a pusher propeller; this helicopter demonstrated "Roto-Prop" pusher propeller for Sikorsky's S-66 design.

A minesweeper version of the Sea King for the U.S. Navy was made, with nine converted from SH-3A aircraft and then called the RH-3A.

In addition to those Sea Kings that were manufactured by Sikorsky, several license agreements were enacted with other firms to produce the type. These included the Japanese conglomerate Mitsubishi and the Italian aerospace company Agusta. Another licensee was the British helicopter manufacturer Westland Helicopters, which substantially redesigned the Sea King to produce various models of their own, collectively referred to as the Westland Sea King. In contrast to the US Navy's Sea Kings, the Westland Sea King was intended for greater operational autonomy. In total, Westland produced 330 Sea Kings; outside of its British-based operators, various export customers were found for the Westland Sea King. including the Indian Naval Air Arm, the German Navy, the Royal Australian Navy, and the Royal Norwegian Air Force.

While Sikorsky opted to terminate its own Sea King production line during the 1970s, the type has had a lengthy service life. In September 2009, it was reported that nearly 600 Sea Kings were believed to still be operational.

== Design ==
The Sikorsky SH-3 Sea King is a twin-engine medium-sized amphibious rotorcraft. Many of the features on board the Sea King represented a considerable advancement over preceding helicopters. In addition to being fully amphibious and capable of operating under all weather conditions, it is the first operational American helicopter to be able to simultaneously hunt and destroy submarines. Its twin-turboshaft powerplant layout gave the SH-3 a higher payload and greater reliability than previous anti-submarine helicopters. In the event of a single engine failing, the Sea King could continue flying on a single engine. The powerplant used on the Sea King is the General Electric T58-GE-8B, which was initially capable of generating up to 1,250 shp (930 kW) each.

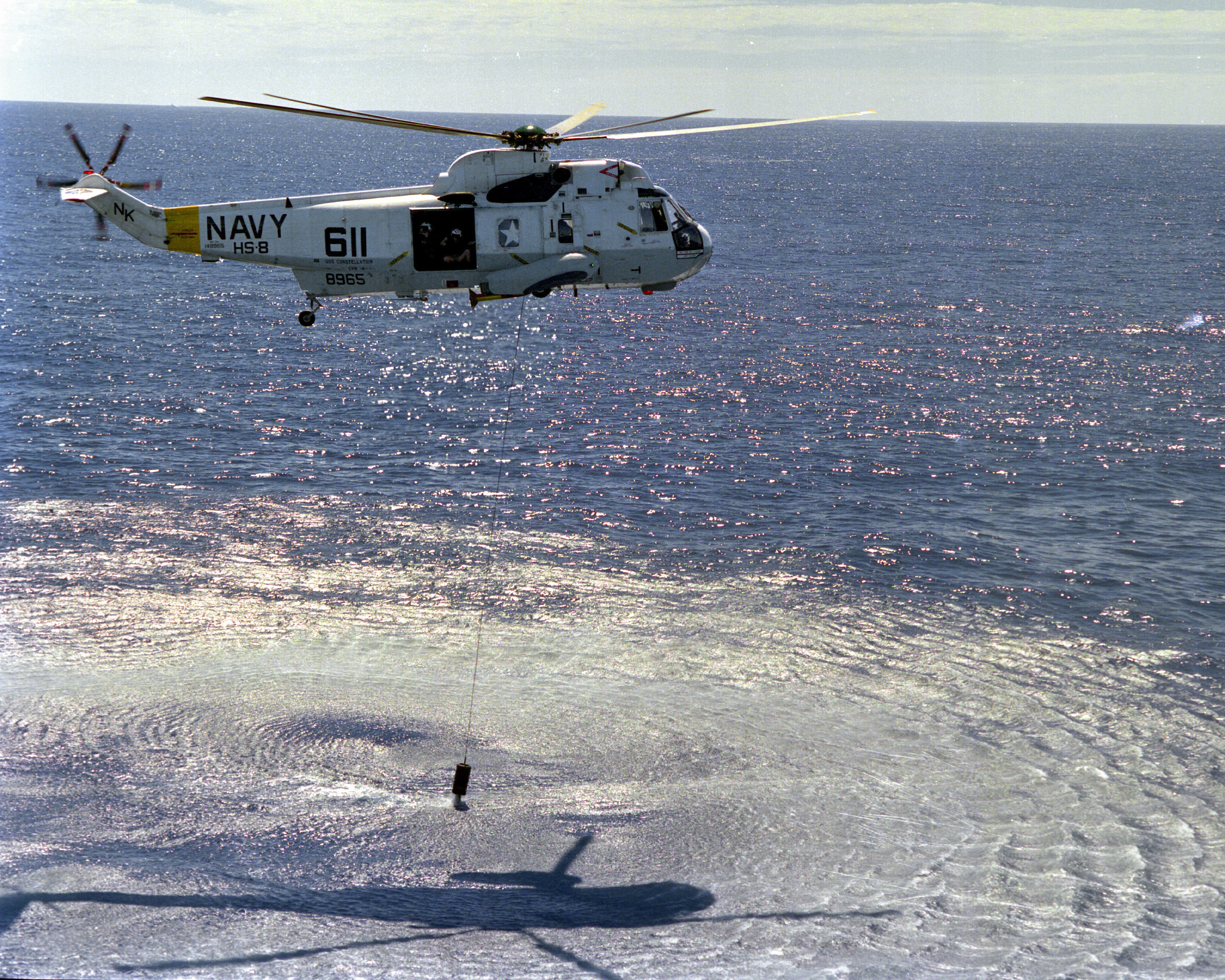
SH-3H deploying a dipping sonar, 1989

In normal operations, the Sea King typically would have a four-man crew on board; these being a pilot and copilot in the cockpit, and two aircrew stationed within the main cabin area. When conducting anti-submarine missions, the rear aircrew operated the aircraft's sensors and interpreted the generated data. For search-and-rescue missions, the Sea King's cabin could accommodate up to 22 survivors. In a medical layout, a maximum of nine stretchers plus two medical officers could be carried. In the troop transport role, up to 28 soldiers can be accommodated.

The Sea King features many design elements to support naval-orientated operations. The main rotor blades and the tail section can be folded via fully automated systems for storage on board ships. The adoption of an amphibious hull allowed a Sea King to conduct a water landing and, being completely watertight, would enable the rotorcraft to remaining floating for prolonged periods on the ocean's surface. Deployable airbags in the aircraft's sponsons added to the rotorcraft's stability and buoyancy, resisting pitching and rolling. The hull design is compatible with landing on challenging terrain, including ice, snow, swamp land, and tundra. Wheels are installed in the sponsons for land operations.

The armament fitted upon a Sea King could vary considerably. For anti-submarine missions, the aircraft could carry up to four torpedoes or four depth charges. For anti-ship duties, some models were outfitted to carry one or two missiles, typically Sea Eagles or Exocets. The Sea King could also be fitted to deploy the B57 nuclear bomb. ASW equipment used on Sea Kings has included the AQS-13A/B/E dipping sonar which included specialized computers for processing sonar and sonobuoy data, various models of sonobuoys, ARR-75 Sonobuoy Receivers, and the ASQ-81 magnetic anomaly detector. The commonly fitted AKT-22 data link enabled the rapid dissemination of sonar information to other friendly elements. Some later Sea King models featured the TACNAV digital navigation system (first generation GPS) and overhauled cockpit instrumentation for night vision compatibility.

== Operational history ==
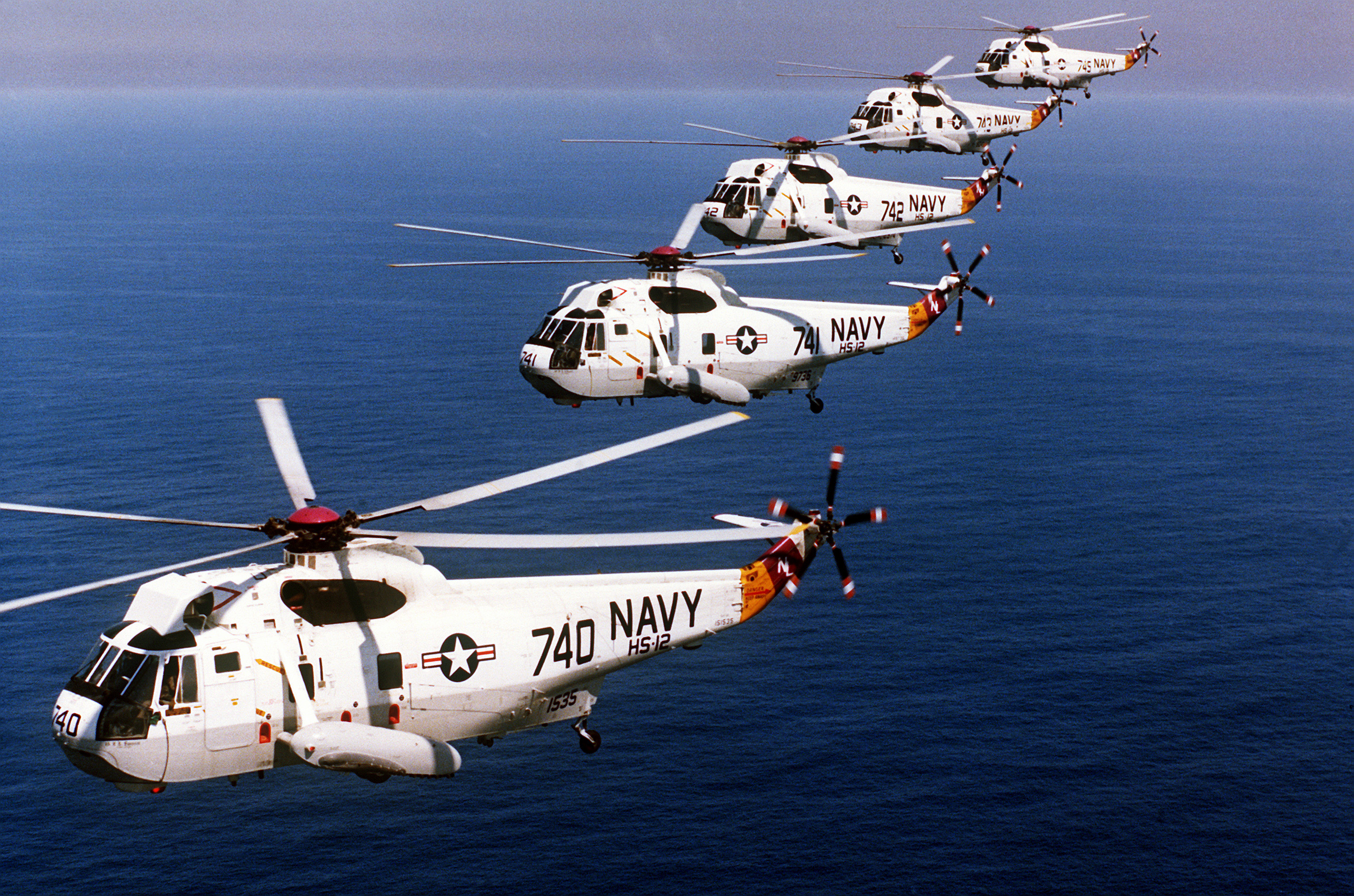
Helicopter Anti-Submarine Squadron HS-12 "Wyverns" flying SH-3H Sea Kings in formation, 1985

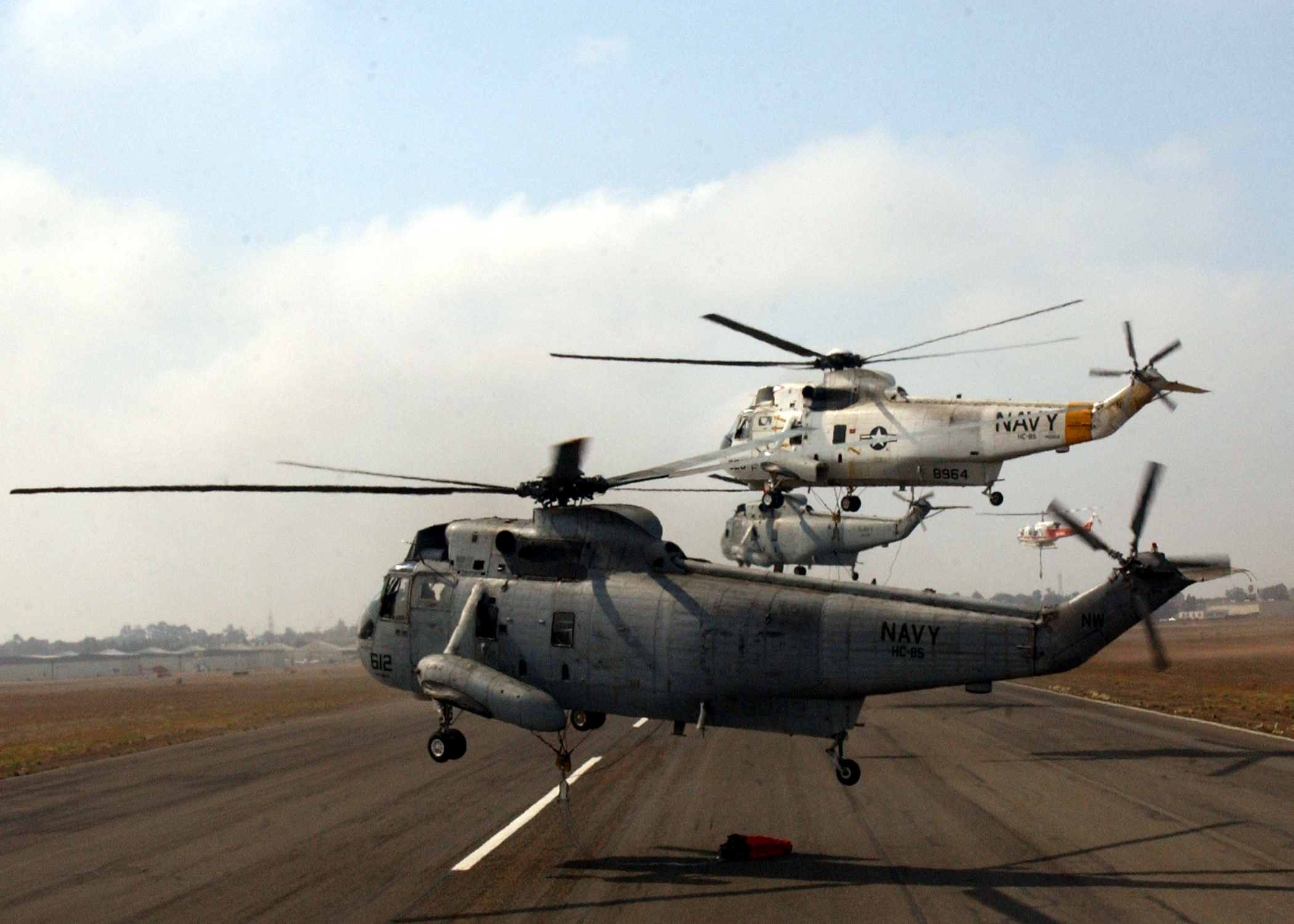
Several UH-3H Sea Kings taking flight to fight the Cedar Fire in San Diego, California, in 2003

During June 1961, the Sea King became operational with the US Navy as the HSS-2; at the time, it was not only the largest amphibious helicopter in the world, but was also the first all-weather rotorcraft to reach production status for the US Navy. When the unified aircraft designation system was introduced, the rotorcraft's designation was changed to SH-3A. It was used primarily for anti-submarine warfare: the largely involved the detection and tracking of Soviet submarines. In the event of open warfare breaking out between the two powers, Sea Kings would have been used to attack these submarines with the intent to sink them.

The Sea King was able to operate from the flight decks of many of the US Navy's vessels as well as shore bases. It could also operate from offshore platforms to extend their surveillance and strike ranges. The type was capable of conducting nighttime ASW operations, albeit these usually posed considerable difficulty for the flight crew.

The Sea King also performed various other roles and missions such as search-and-rescue, transport, anti-shipping and airborne early warning operations. Aircraft carriers would typically deploy Sea Kings to operate near the carrier as a plane guard, ready to rescue air crew who crashed during takeoff or landing. They were routinely used in a logistical capacity at sea, transferring personnel, mail, and other lighter cargoes between vessels.

The Royal Canadian Navy (RCN) became a major operator of the Sikorsky CH-124 Sea King following its introduction to service in 1963. It remained Canada's dominant maritime helicopter for over 50 years, finally being withdrawn in 2018. One notable innovation in Canadian operations, which was subsequently adopted by several other nations, was the use of a winch 'hauldown' landing and securing method, referred to as a 'Beartrap'. This device considerably increased the ability of Sea Kings to land in difficult conditions, such as on small flight decks or during poor weather conditions.

The Sea King was exported in large numbers to various nations, such as Brazil, Italy, Japan and the United Kingdom. Several operators have kept their Sea Kings in use for more than 50 years.

During the Vietnam War, SH-3s rescued the crews of downed aircraft at sea and over land, typically being equipped with self-sealing fuel tanks, multiple machine guns and heavy armor when performing such missions. Due to the type's greater range and the safety of having two engines, it was often used during rescue sorties into North Vietnam to retrieve downed aircrew. The Sea King was also used for medical evacuations and disaster relief efforts.

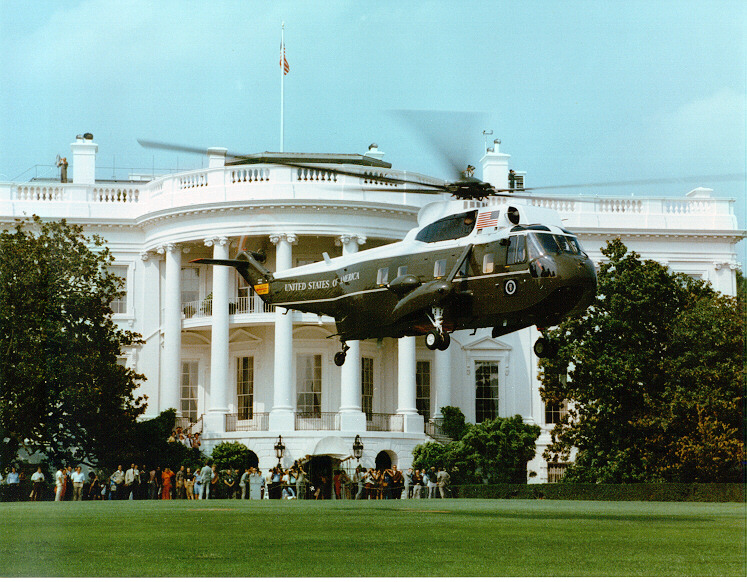
U.S. Marine Corps VH-3 Sea King, operating as Marine One, landing on the White House South Lawn

The SH-3 was the primary helicopter for retrieving crewed space capsules starting with Mercury-Atlas 7 in May 1962. Helicopter 66 was the primary recovery vehicle for Apollo missions 8 and 10 to 13. In February 1971, an SH-3A, operating from the amphibious assault ship USS New Orleans, recovered Apollo 14. A specialist search and rescue variant of the SH-3, the HH-3, also performed in this capacity.

From 5-7 October 1982, the Navy sent two of its SH-3H anti submarine variants to Chesapeake Bay, Virginia, to participate in testing of the Arapaho Containerized Aircraft Handling System aboard the modified container ship MA-257, Export Leader. Along with several other models of helicopters, the SH-3s conducted 178 day landings, some of which were conducted simultaneously. In addition, the SH-3s also partnered with a UH-1N to conduct 45 night landings, 15 of which included embarked British officers onboard the helicopters. Although these tests were largely successful, the Navy ultimately decided against continuing the program or putting it into service.

During the 1990s, the Sea King was replaced in the ASW and SAR roles by the U.S. Navy with the newer Sikorsky SH-60 Sea Hawk. However, the SH-3 continued to operate in reserve units in roles including logistical support, search and rescue, and transport. On 27 January 2006, the SH-3 was ceremonially retired at NAS Norfolk, Virginia, by Helicopter Combat Support Squadron 2 (HC-2). They have been replaced by increasingly advanced variants of the SH-60 Sea Hawk. In the early 21st century, following their drawdown in US service, there have been a number of initiatives to refurbish ex-military Sea Kings for continued operations; in addition to civil operators, nations such as Egypt and India acquired refurbished former US Sea Kings to supplement their own aging fleets.

Several Sea Kings were operated by the United States Marine Corps's HMX-1 unit flying as the official helicopters transporting the President of the United States with the call sign "Marine One." In 1992, the US Justice Department sued Sikorsky over allegations of overcharged component pricing and deliberately misleading US Navy negotiators. In 1997, the Justice Department issued further accusations against Sikorsky of willful overcharging on a contract to upgrade the Navy's Sea Kings. Since 2010, a replacement helicopter fleet for the Sea King was pending under the VXX program. In 2024, the VH-92 Patriot replaced the VH-3D as the Marine One helicopter except for White House flights because its more powerful rotor wash burnt and uprooted the South Lawn landing zone creating hazardous flying debris. In September 2026, the White House helipad was completed and the VH-3D was destined for retirement.

== Variants ==
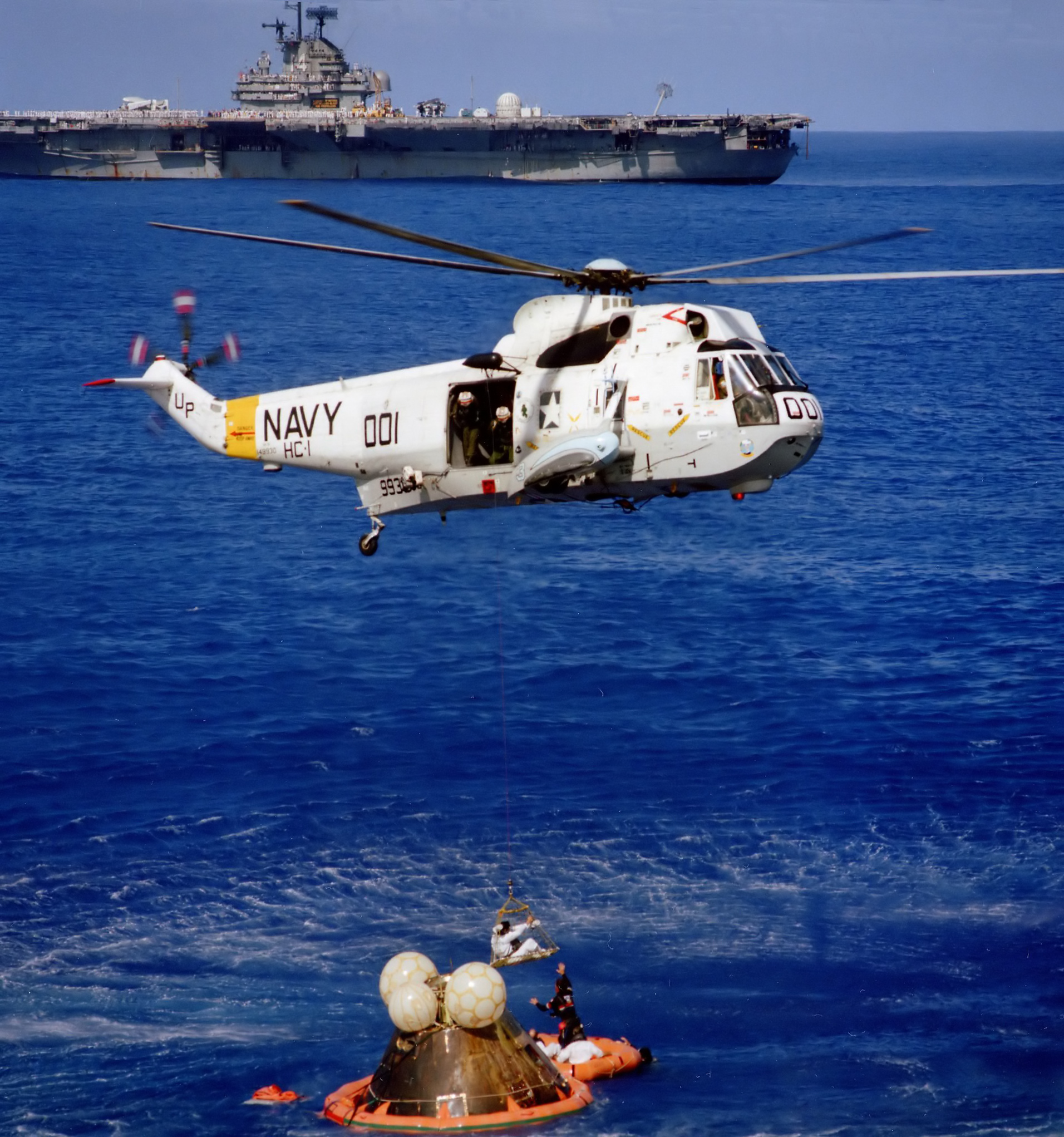
A SH-3G Sea King helps recover Apollo 17. Ticonderoga is in the background

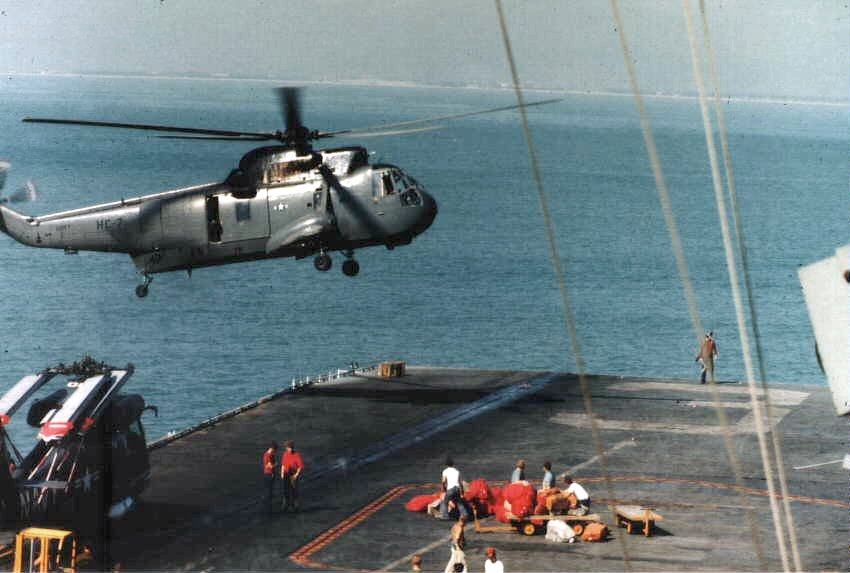
HH-3A on Bon Homme Richard

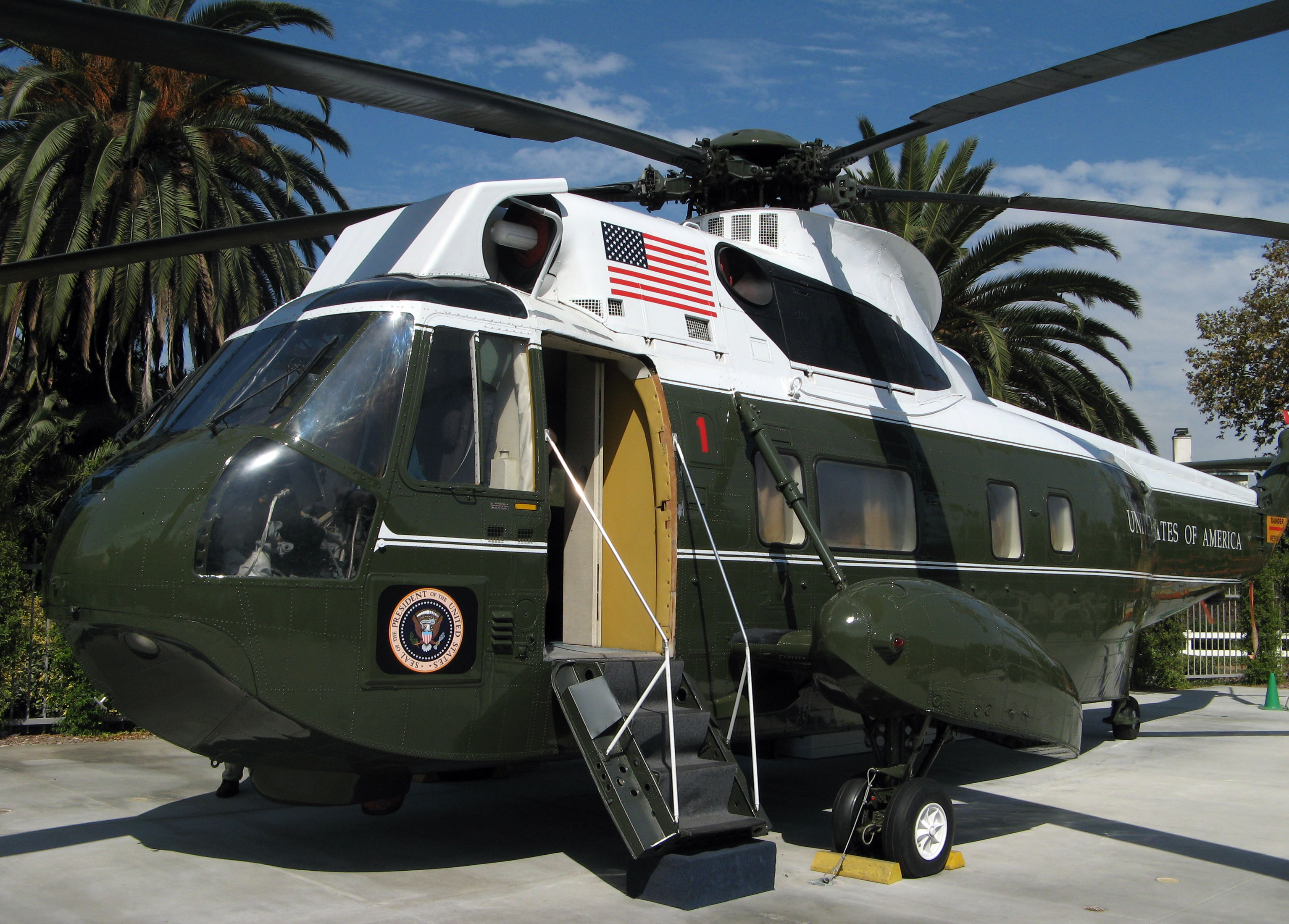
Army One, a VH-3A "Sea King" that served in the Presidential fleet from 1961 to 1976, on permanent display at the Nixon Library

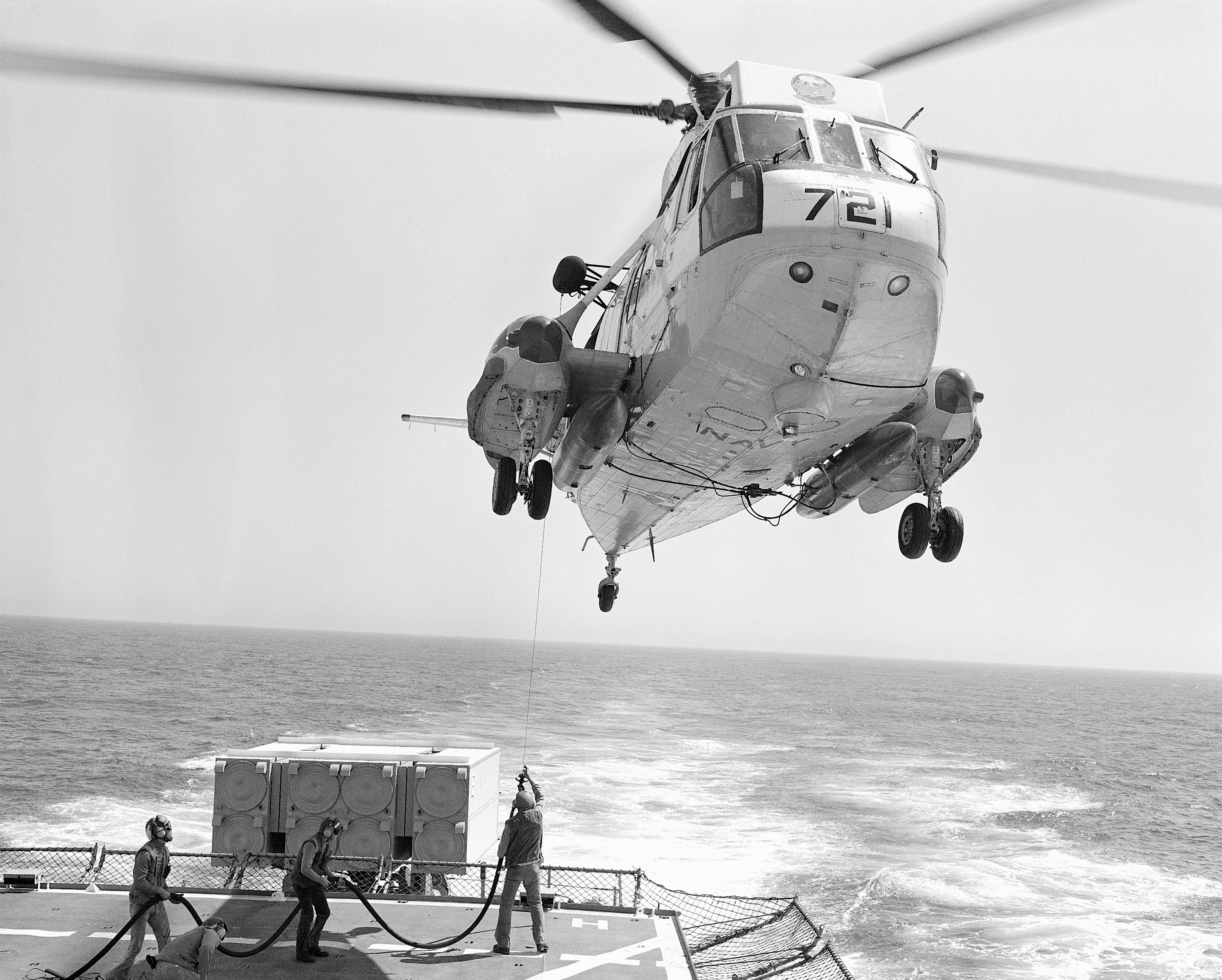
SH-3G in 1981

=== US military ===
XHSS-2
The only prototype of the H-3 Sea King.
YHSS-2
Pre-production S-61 aircraft, seven built for the U.S. Navy, re-designated YSH-3A in 1962.
HSS-2
Original designation of the Sea King. Changed to SH-3A by the 1962 United States Tri-Service aircraft designation system
SH-3A
Anti-submarine warfare helicopter for the U.S. Navy; 245 built. Originally designated HSS-2.
HH-3A
Combat search and rescue helicopter for the U.S. Navy. 12 converted from SH-3A.
CH-3A
Military transport version for the U.S. Air Force; three converted from SH-3As into CH-3A configuration; they later became CH-3Bs.
NH-3A (S-61F)
Experimental high-speed compound helicopter, with extensive streamlining, no floats, short wings carrying two turbojet engines for extra speed; one converted from SH-3A. Later modified with a tail rotor able to rotate 90° to serve as a pusher propeller; this helicopter demonstrated "Roto-Prop" pusher propeller for Sikorsky's S-66 design.
RH-3A
Minesweeper helicopter for the U.S. Navy. Nine converted from SH-3A aircraft.
VH-3A
VIP transport (Better known as Marine One or Army One 1957–76) helicopter for the U.S. Army and Marine Corps; originally designated HSS-2Z. Eight built, plus two SH-3A conversions rebuilt from damaged helicopters (one YHSS-2 and one SH-3A). The rest were returned to the U.S. Navy in 1975–76 and replaced by the VH-3D.
CH-3B
Military transport helicopter for the U.S. Air Force.
SH-3D
Anti-submarine warfare helicopter for the U.S. Navy. 73 built and two conversions from SH-3As.
VH-3D
VIP Presidential transport helicopter (better known as Marine One) for the U.S. Marine Corps, 11 built. It entered service in 1976.
SH-3G
Cargo, utility transport helicopter for the U.S. Navy. 105 conversions from SH-3A and SH-3D.
SH-3H
Upgrade of the SH-3G as an anti-submarine warfare (ASW) helicopter for the U.S. Navy. It included SH-3G features with improvements for ASW, anti-ship missile detection and other airframe improvements. 163 SH-3A/D/Gs were upgraded to SH-3H configuration.
SH-3H AEW
Airborne early warning version for the Spanish navy.
UH-3H
Cargo, utility transport version for the U.S. Navy; converted from SH-3H by removing ASW systems.

=== Sikorsky designations ===
S-61
Company designation for the Sea King.
S-61A
Export version for the Royal Danish Air Force. Wider pontoons without flotation bags, a 530-liter center tank instead of a dipping sonar and no automatic powered folding system.
S-61A-4 Nuri
Military transport, search and rescue helicopter for the Royal Malaysian Air Force. It can seat up to 31 combat troops. 38 built.
S-61A/AH
Utility helicopter for survey work and search and rescue in the Antarctic.
S-61B
Export version of the SH-3 anti-submarine warfare helicopter for the Japanese Maritime Self Defense Force.
S-61D-3
Export version for the Brazilian Navy.
S-61D-4
Export version for the Argentine Navy.
S-61NR
Search and rescue version for the Argentine Air Force.
S-61V
Company designation for the VH-3A. One built for Indonesia.

S-61L/N

Civil versions of the Sea King.
S-61R

The S-61R served in the United States Air Force as the CH-3C/E Sea King and the HH-3E Jolly Green Giant, and with the United States Coast Guard and the Italian Air Force as the HH-3F Sea King (more commonly referred to by the nickname "Pelican").

=== United Aircraft of Canada ===
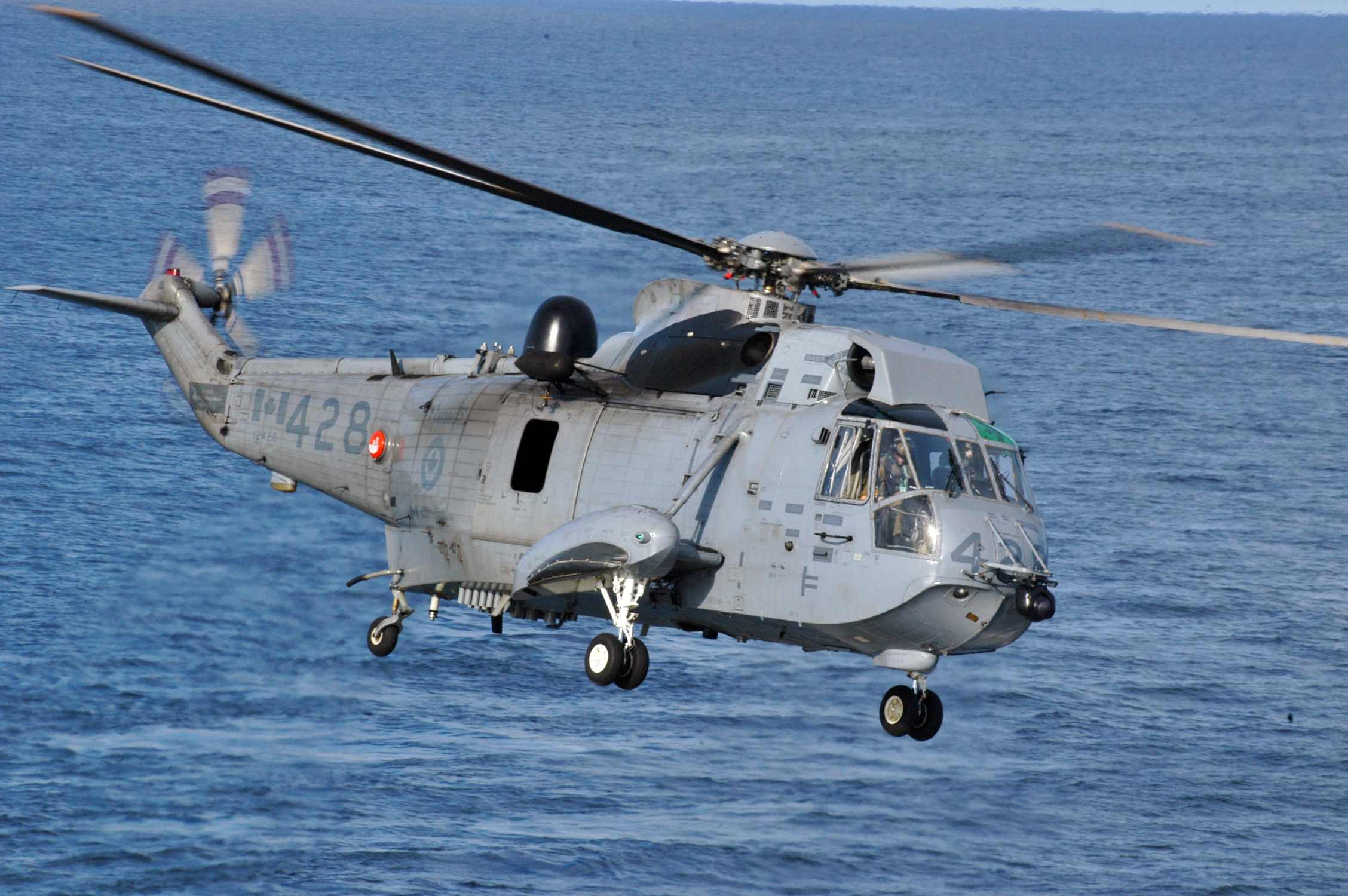
Canadian Sikorsky CH-124A Sea King

CH-124
Anti-submarine warfare helicopter for the Royal Canadian Navy (41 assembled by United Aircraft of Canada).
CH-124A
The Sea King Improvement Program (SKIP) added modernized avionics as well as improved safety features.
CH-124B
Alternate version of the CH-124A without a dipping sonar but formerly with a MAD sensor and additional storage for deployable stores. In 2006, the five aircraft of this variant were converted to support the Standing Contingency Task Force (SCTF), and were modified with additional troop seats, and frequency agile radios. Plans to add fast-rope capability, EAPSNIPS (Engine Air Particle Separator / Snow & Ice Particle Separator) did not come to fruition.
CH-124B2
Six CH-124Bs were upgraded to the CH-124B2 standard in 1991–1992. The revised CH-124B2 retained the sonobuoy processing gear to passively detect submarines but was also fitted with a towed-array sonar to supplement the ship's sonar. Since anti-submarine warfare is no longer a major priority within the Canadian Forces, the CH-124B2 were refitted again to become improvised troop carriers for the newly formed Standing Contingency Task Force.
CH-124C
One CH-124 operated by the Helicopter Operational Test and Evaluation Facility located at CFB Shearwater. Used for testing new gear, and when not testing new gear, it is deployable to any Canadian Forces ship requiring a helicopter.
CH-124U
Unofficial designation for four CH-124s that were modified for passenger/freight transport. One crashed in 1973, and the survivors were later refitted to become CH-124A's.

=== Westland ===
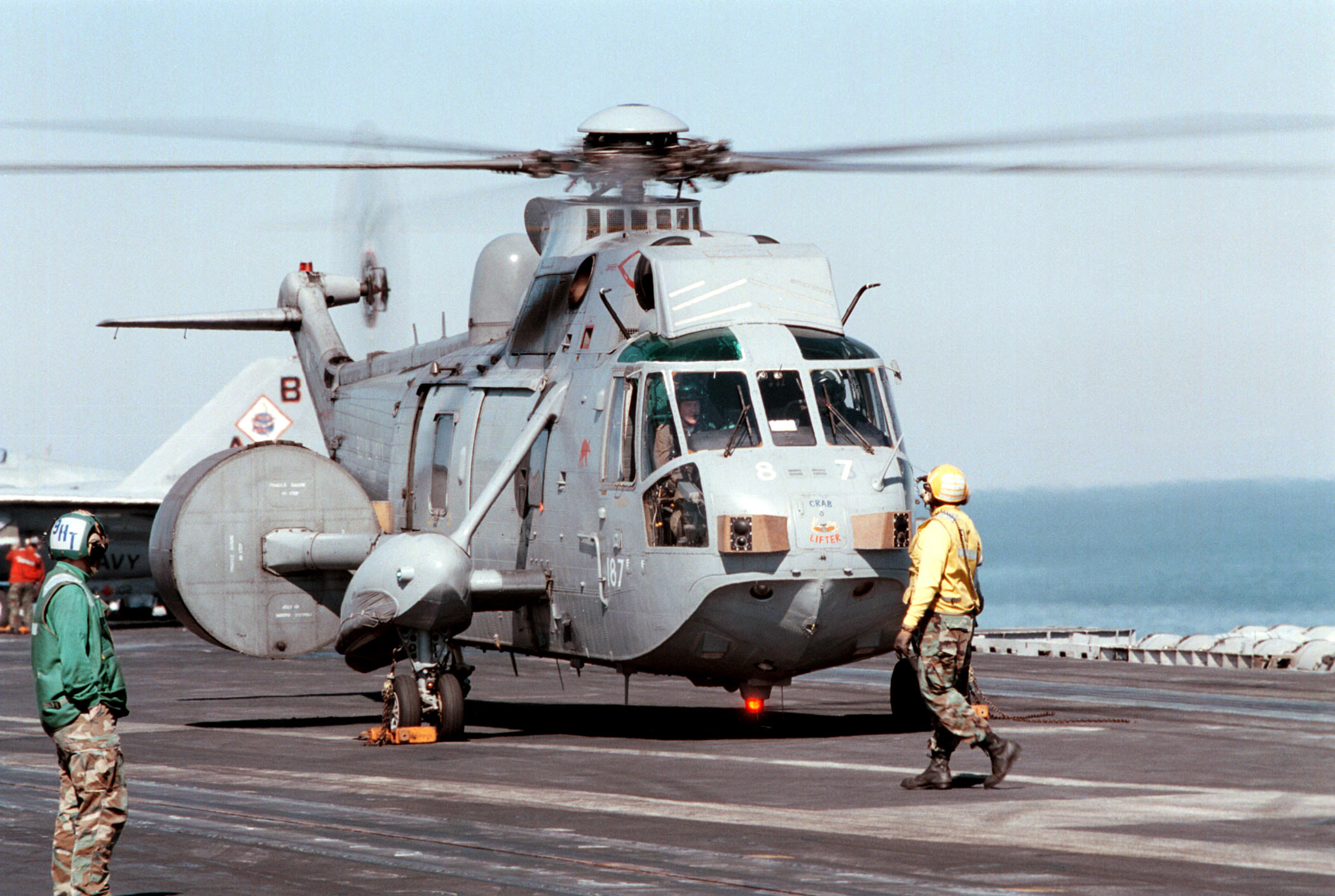
Westland Sea King AEW.2A of the Royal Navy in 1998

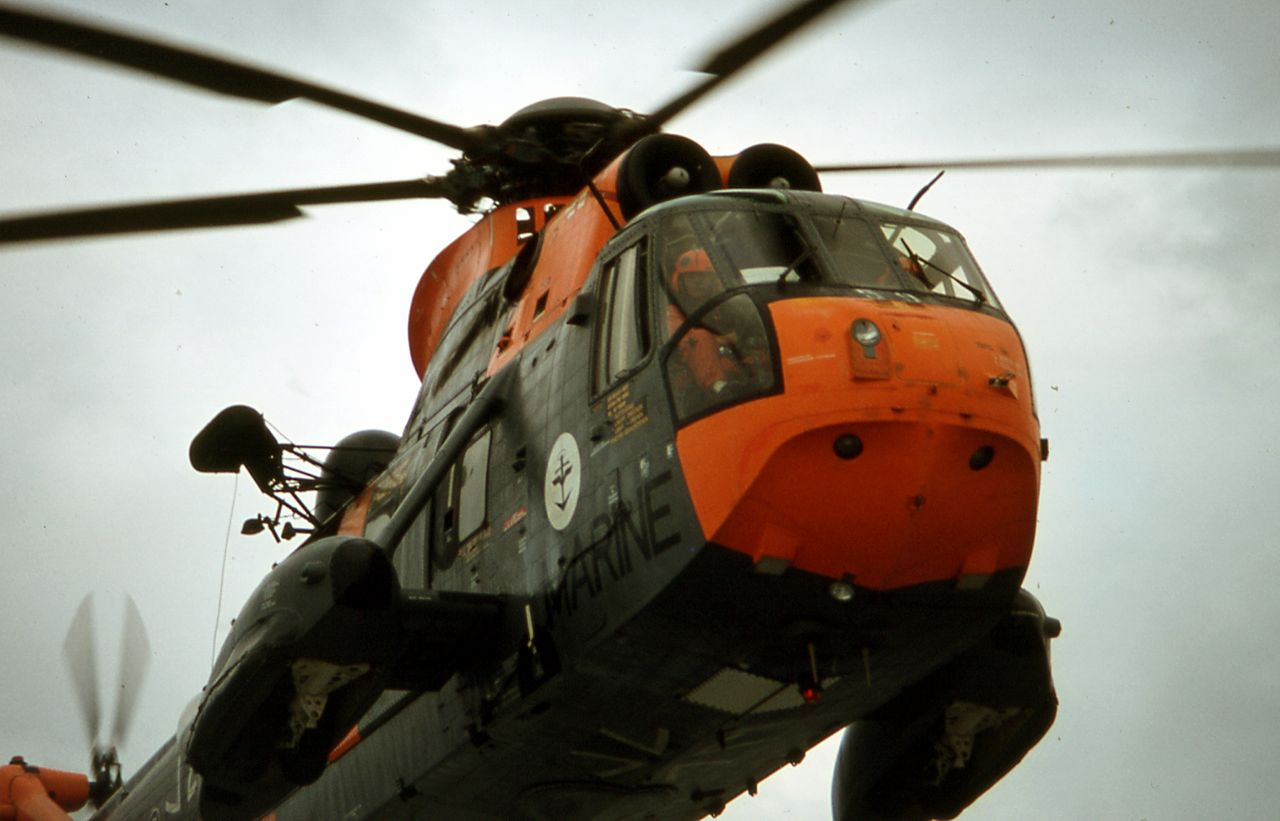
German Navy Sea King in 1980, made by Westland

The Westland Sea King variant was manufactured under license by Westland Helicopters Ltd in the United Kingdom, who developed a specially modified version for the Royal Navy. It is powered by a pair of Rolls-Royce Gnome turbines (license-built T58s), and has British avionics and ASW equipment. This variant first flew in 1969, and entered service the next year. It was until 2017 also used by the Royal Air Force in a search and rescue capacity, and has been sold to many countries around the world.

=== Agusta ===
AS-61
Company designation for the H-3 Sea King built under license in Italy by Agusta.
AS-61A-1
Italian export model for the Royal Malaysian Air Force.
AS-61A-4
Military transport, search and rescue helicopter.
AS-61N-1 Silver
License built model of the S-61N, with a shortened cabin.
AS-61R
version basing upon Sikorsky S-61R
AS-61VIP
VIP transport helicopter.
ASH-3A (SH-3G)
Utility transport helicopter
ASH-3D
Anti-submarine warfare helicopter. Flown by the Italian, Brazilian, Iranian, Peruvian and Argentinian navies.
ASH-3TS
VIP, executive transport mission helicopter. Also known as the ASH-3D/TS, the Italian Air Force operated 2 from 1975 until 2012.
ASH-3H
Anti-submarine warfare helicopter.

=== Mitsubishi ===
S-61A
License-built version of the S-61A as Search-and-Rescue and Utility helicopters for the Japan Maritime Self Defense Force. 18 built.
HSS-2
License-built version of the S-61B as an anti-submarine warfare helicopter for the Japan Maritime Self Defense Force. 55 built.
HSS-2A
License-built version of the S-61B (SH-3D) as an anti-submarine warfare helicopter for the Japan Maritime Self Defense Force. 28 built.
HSS-2B
License-built version of the S-61B (SH-3H) as an anti-submarine warfare helicopter for the Japan Maritime Self Defense Force. 23 built.

== Operators ==
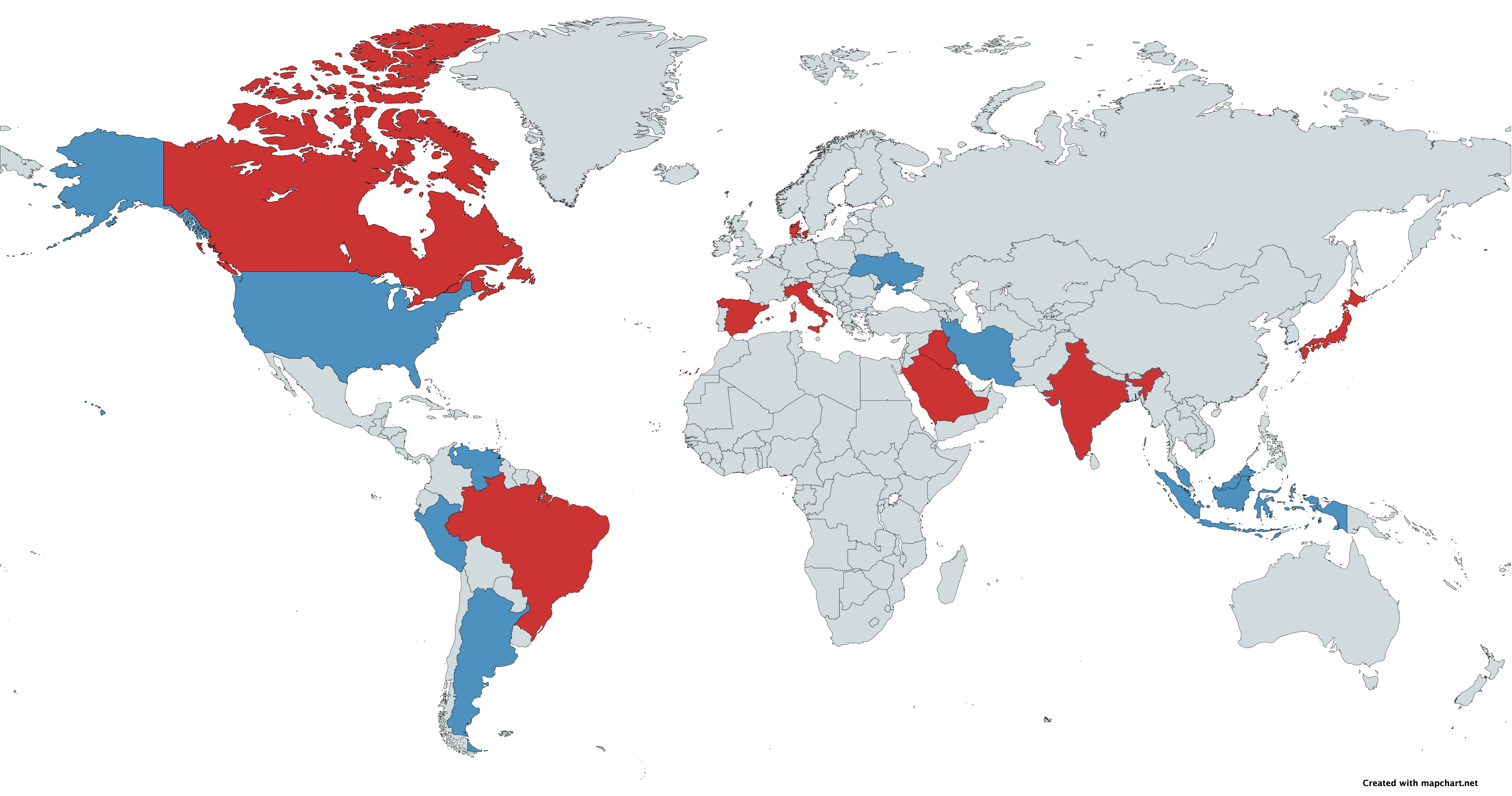
Map with current operators of the SH-3 in blue and former operators in red. This does not include the S-61R or Westland Sea King users

=== Current ===
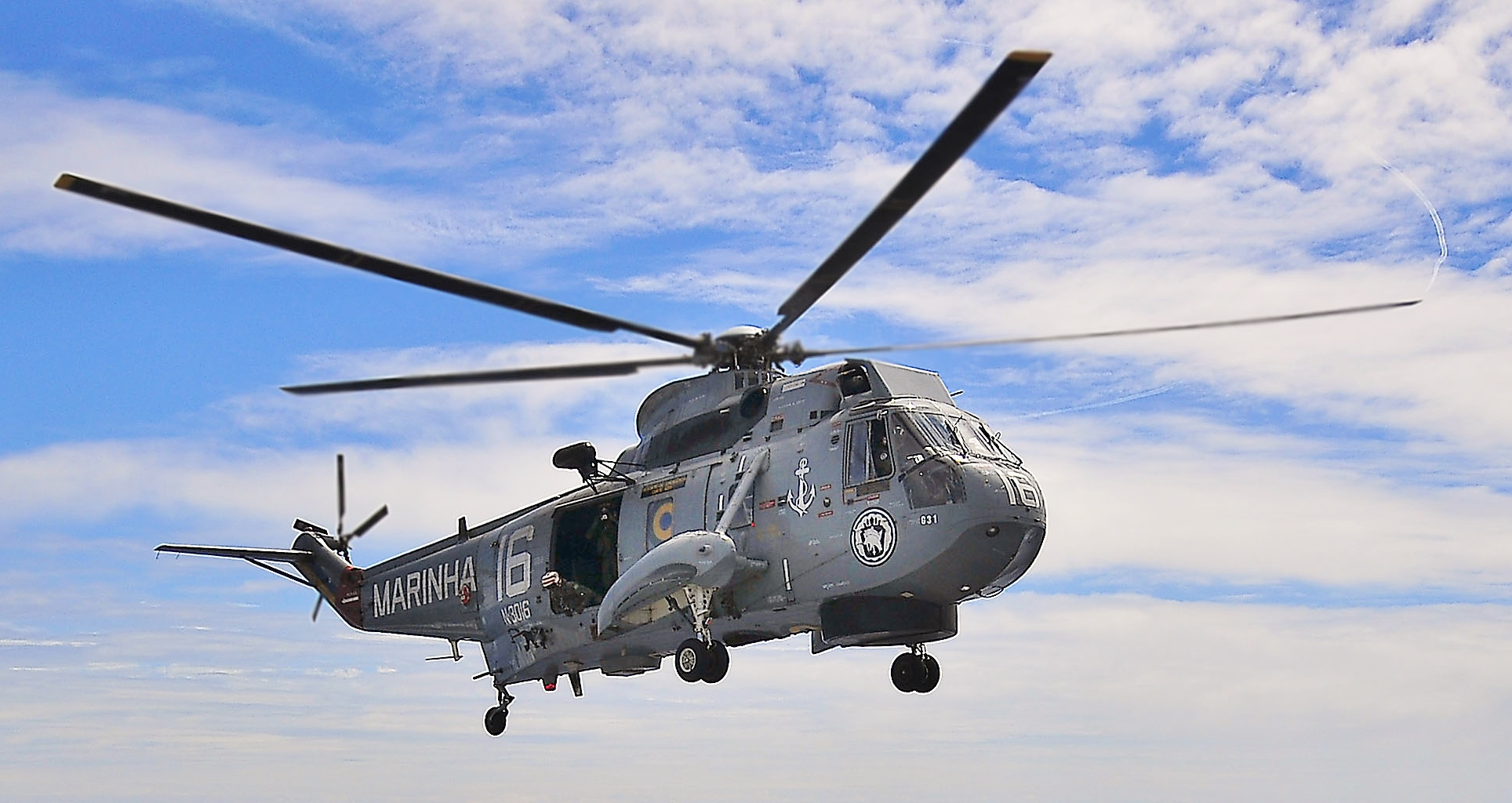
A Brazilian Sea King

Argentina

- Argentine Naval Aviation

Indonesia

- National Disaster Management Authority – An S-61A is leased from Cardig Air.

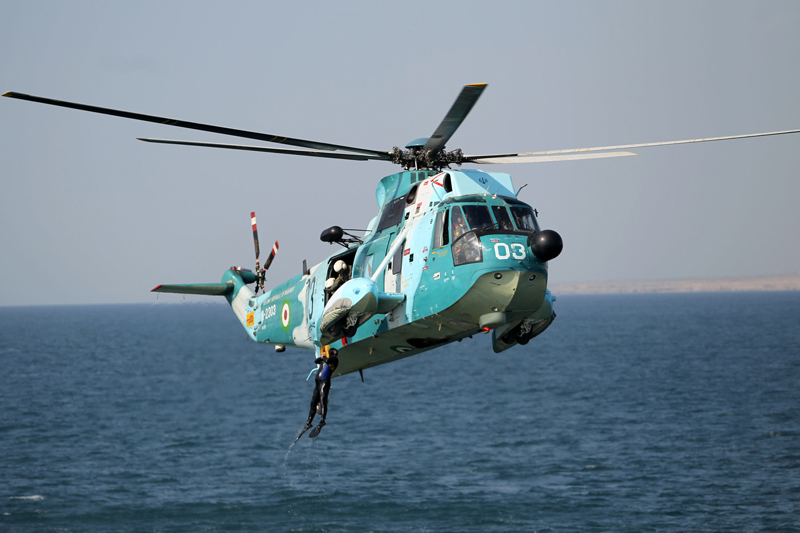
An Iranian Navy Sea King in 2012

Iran

- Iranian Navy

Peru

- Peruvian Navy
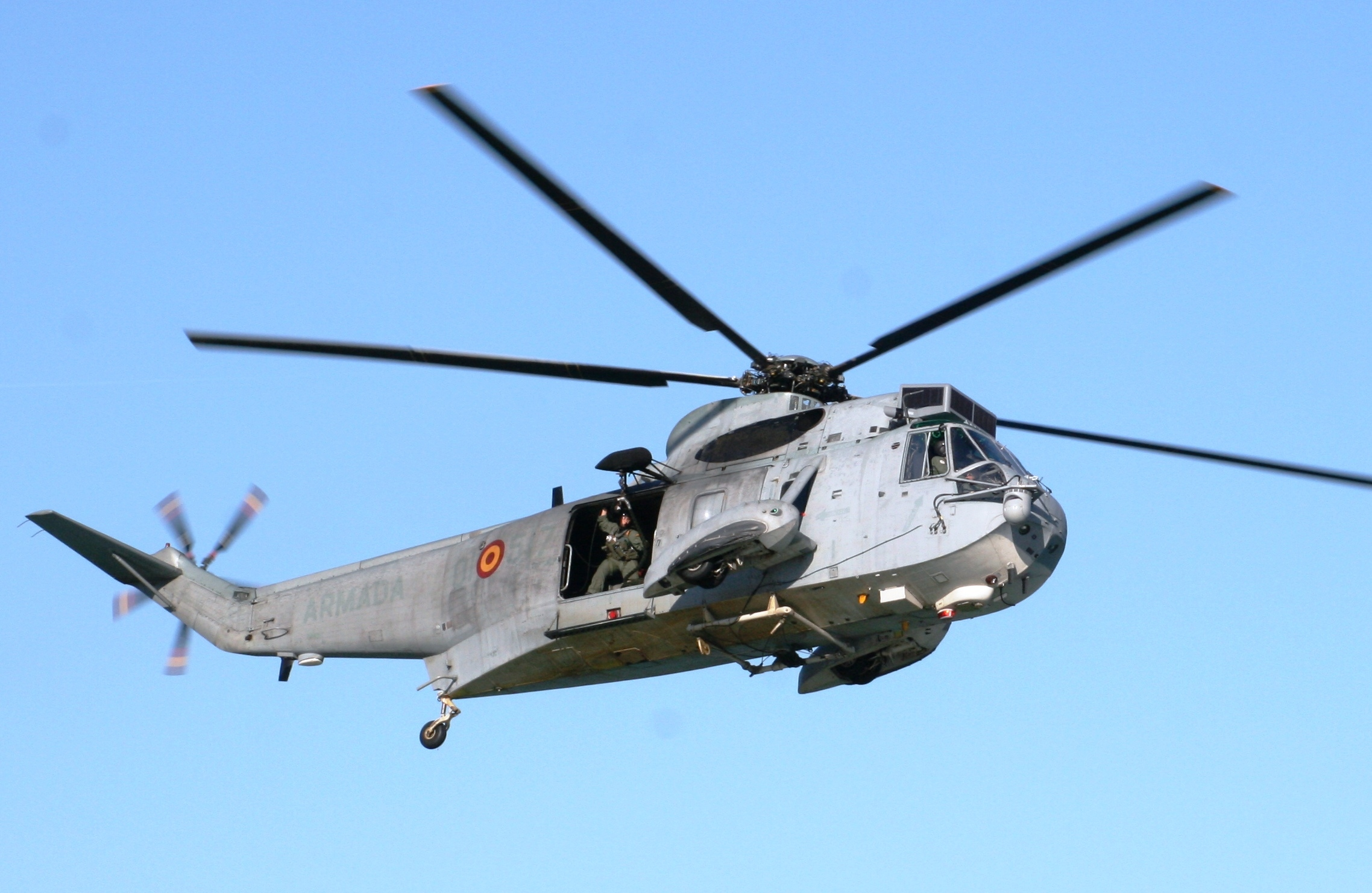
  A Spanish Navy SH-3H Sea King in 2009.

Ukraine

- Ukrainian Navy

United States

- United States Marine Corps
  - HMX-1

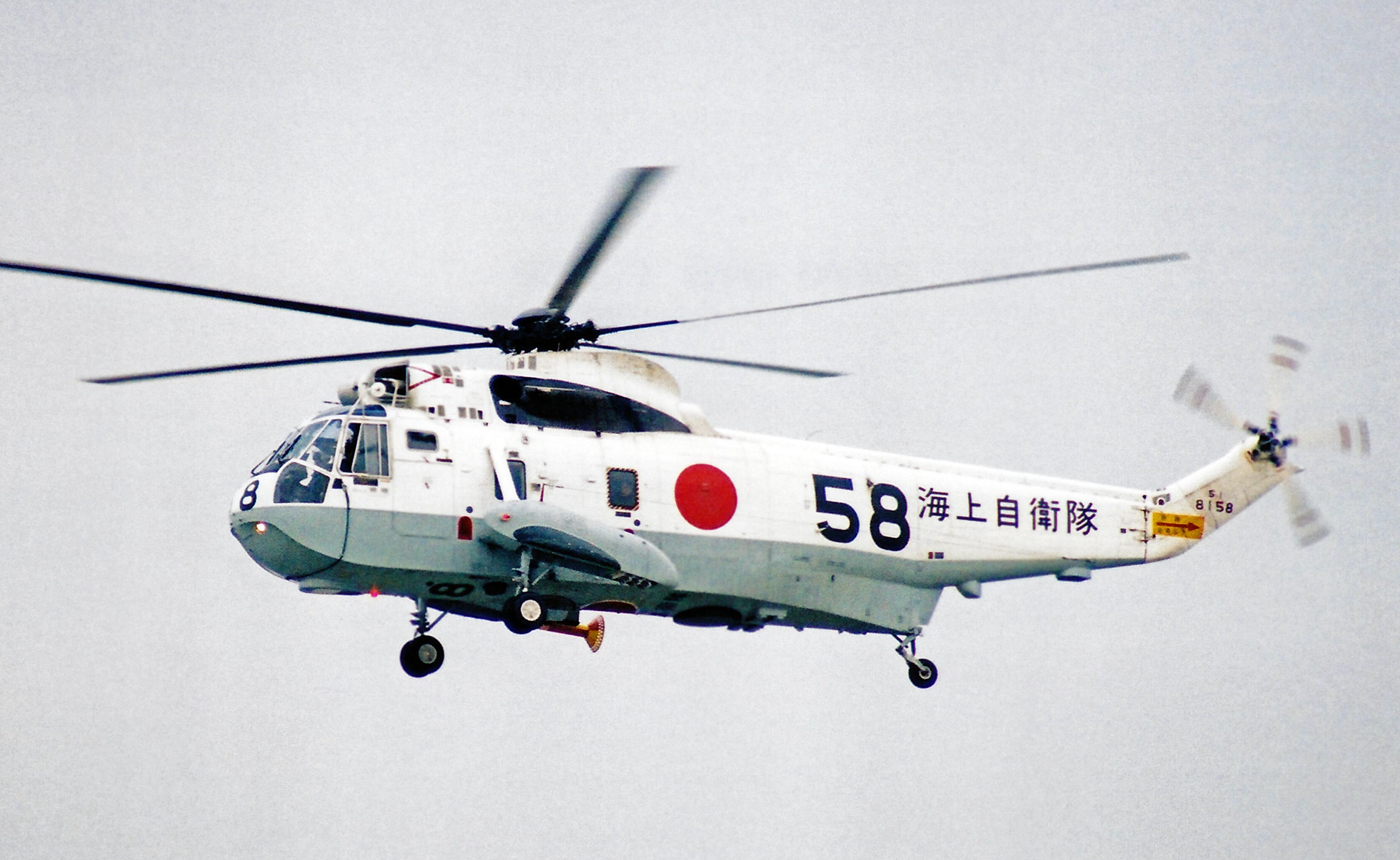
A Sikorsky S-61 of the Japan Maritime Self Defense Force

Venezuela

- Venezuelan Army

=== Former ===
Brazil

- Brazilian Navy

Canada

- Royal Canadian Navy – transferred to Air Command in 1968
- Royal Canadian Air Force (See: CH-124 Sea King) – retired in December 2018

Denmark

- Royal Danish Air Force

India

- Indian Navy – replaced by Westland Sea King Mk.42C at INAS 350 to serve onboard INS Jalashwa (L41).

Indonesia

- Indonesian Air Force – one S-61V as presidential helicopter

Iraq

- Iraqi Air Force

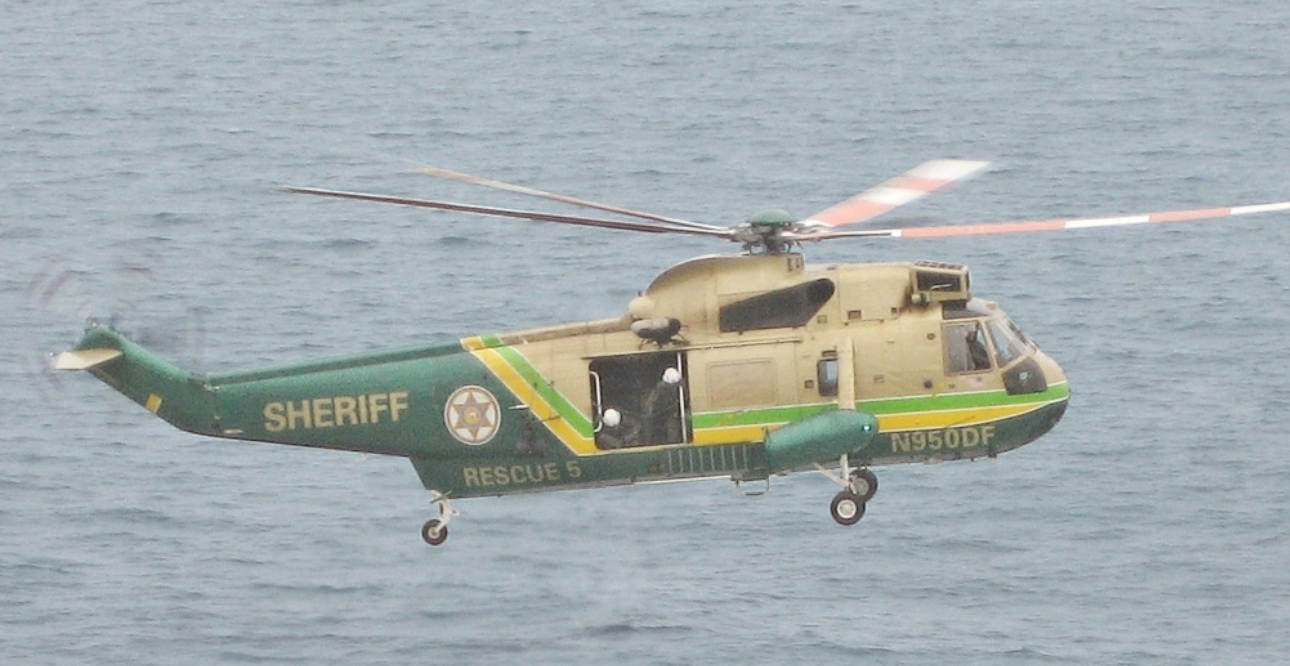
LASD's Rescue 5, flies offshore near Rancho Palos Verdes.

Italy

- Italian Air Force – retired in September 2014
- Italian Navy – retired in June 2013

Japan

- Japan Maritime Self Defense Force

Malaysia

- Royal Malaysian Air Force – some helicopter transferred to Malaysian Army Aviation
- Malaysian Army Aviation – ex-RMAF, was assigned to No. 882 Squadron.

Saudi Arabia

- Royal Saudi Air Force

Spain

- Spanish Navy

United States

- L.A. County Sheriff's Department
- United States Air Force
- United States Navy

== Aircraft on display ==
Argentina

- 0675 – S-61D-4 on static display at the Argentine Naval Aviation Museum in Bahia Blanca, Buenos Aires.

Brazil

- N-3009 – SH-3D on static display at the waterfront in São Pedro da Aldeia, Rio de Janeiro.
- N-3012 – SH-3D on static display at the Museu Oceanográfico da Univali in Balneário Piçarras, Santa Catarina.
- N-3017 – SH-3D on static display at the CENIPA in Brasília.
- N-3018 – SH-3D on static display at Centro Cultural da Marinha in Rio de Janeiro.

Denmark

- U-240 – S-61A on static display at the Danmarks Flymuseum in Skjern, Central Denmark..

India

- Saaras – UH-3H Sea king ASW preserved at beach road in Visakhapatnam.

United States

An SH-3 Sea King on display at the Patuxent River Naval Air Museum.

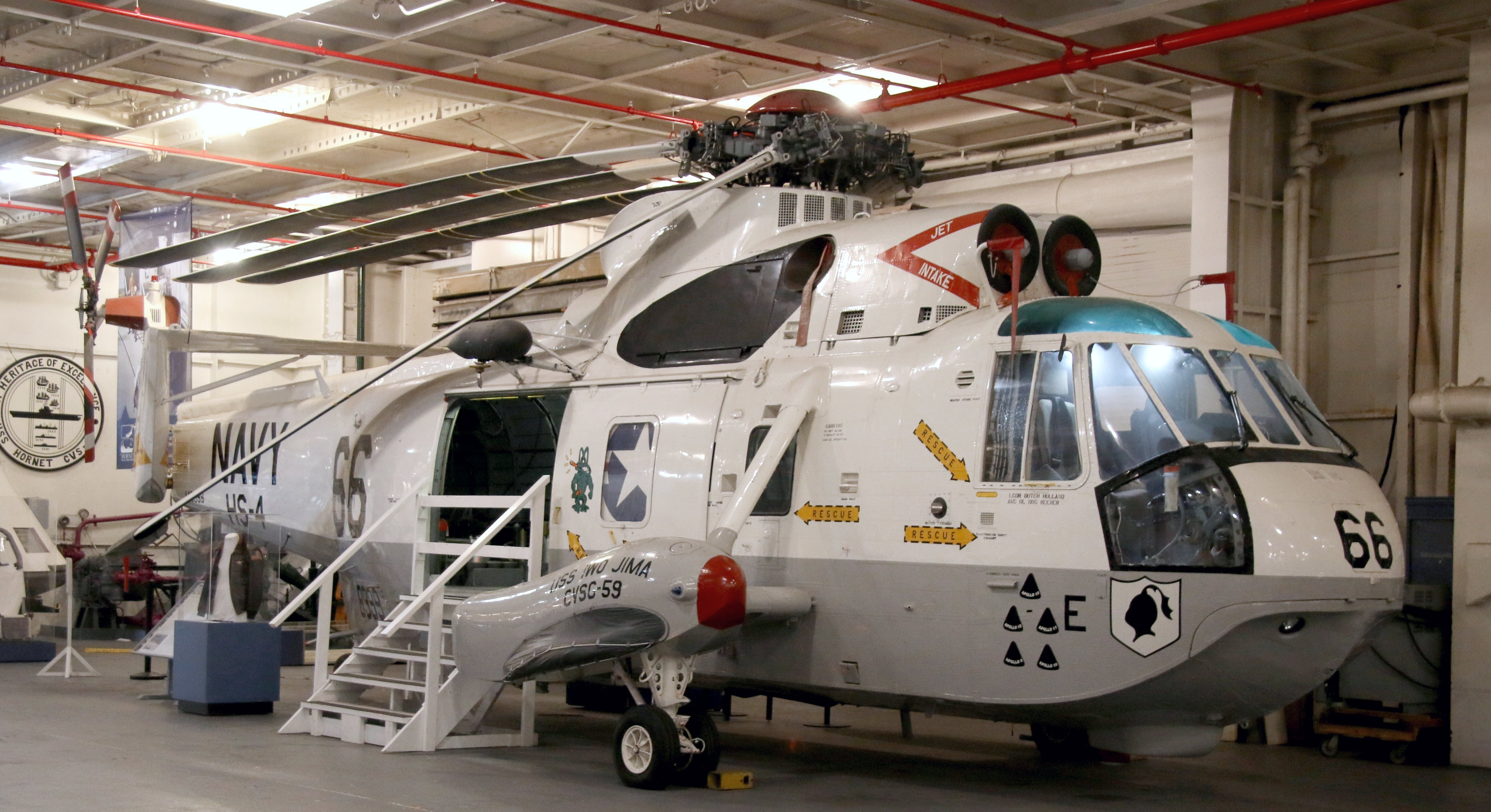
Sikorsky SH-3H Sea King at the Hornet Carrier museum in California.

- 147140 – HH-3A on static display at the Pacific Missile Range Facility in Kekaha, Hawaii.
- 148038 – UH-3A on static display at the Patuxent River Naval Air Museum in Lexington Park, Maryland.
- 148042 – UH-3H on static display at Naval Station Norfolk in Norfolk, Virginia.
- 148999 – SH-3H on static display at the USS Hornet Museum in Alameda, California.
- 149006 – UH-3H on static display at the Evergreen Aviation & Space Museum in McMinnville, Oregon. It is painted as Apollo 11 recovery helicopter.
- 149695 – SH-3G on static display at Naval Air Station Jacksonville in Jacksonville, Florida.
- 149711 – SH-3H on static display at the USS Midway Museum in San Diego, California.
- 149738 – SH-3H on static display at the Hickory Aviation Museum in Hickory, North Carolina. It was previously on display at the Quonset Air Museum in North Kingston, Rhode Island.
- 149932 – SH-3G on static display at Patriots Point in Charleston, South Carolina.
- 150611 – VH-3A on static display at the Ronald Reagan Presidential Library in Simi Valley, California.
- 150613 – VH-3A on static display at the National Naval Aviation Museum in Pensacola, Florida.
- 150617 – VH-3A on static display at the Richard Nixon Presidential Library and Museum in Yorba Linda, California.
- 151556 – HH-3A on static display at the American Helicopter Museum & Education Center in West Chester, Pennsylvania.
- 156484 – SH-3D on static display at the National Naval Aviation Museum in Pensacola, Florida.
- 156501 – SH-3H on static display at Aviation Heritage Park in Bowling Green, Kentucky.
- 159358 – VH-3D on static display at the George H.W. Bush Presidential Library and Museum in College Station, Texas.

== Specifications (SH-3D) ==
Orthographically projected diagram of the SH-3 Sea King

External videos
- SH-3 at NAS Oceana Airshow, 2004
- External and cockpit footage of Sea King start up and take off

Data from Jane's All the World's Aircraft 1979-80

General characteristics

- Crew: 2 flight crew + 2 sonar operators
- Capacity: (S-61A transport) 26 troops, or 15 stretchers, or 12 VIP passengers
- Length: 54 ft 9 in (16.69 m)
- Width: 16 ft 4 in (4.98 m) (rotors folded)
- Height: 16 ft 10 in (5.13 m) (tail rotor at high position)
- Empty weight: 11,865 lb (5,382 kg)
- Gross weight: 18,626 lb (8,449 kg) (ASW mission)
- Max takeoff weight: 21,500 lb (9,752 kg)
- Powerplant: 2 × General Electric T58-GE-10 turboshaft engines, 1,400 shp (1,044 kW) each (total power limited to 2,500 hp (1,864 kW) by main gearbox)
- Main rotor diameter: 62 ft 0 in (18.90 m)
- Main rotor area: 3,019 sq ft (280.5 m^{2})
- Blade section: NACA 0012

Performance

- Maximum speed: 144 kn (166 mph, 267 km/h)
- Cruise speed: 118 kn (136 mph, 219 km/h) for max range
- Range: 542 nmi (625 mi, 1,005 km) with max fuel, 10% reserves
- Service ceiling: 14,700 ft (4,480 m)
- Rate of climb: 2,200 ft/min (11.2 m/s) at sea level
- (All performance figures at weight of 20,500 lb (9,300 kg))

Armament

- Up to 840 lb (380 kg) of weapons total
- 2× Mk 46/44 anti-submarine torpedoes (SH-3H)
- Various sonobuoys and pyrotechnic devices
- B57 nuclear depth charge

== See also ==
Related development

- Sikorsky CH-124 Sea King
- Sikorsky S-61L/N
- Sikorsky S-61R
- Sikorsky HH-52 Seaguard
- Sikorsky S-67 Blackhawk
- Sikorsky S-72
- Westland Sea King

Aircraft of comparable role, configuration, and era

- Aérospatiale SA 321 Super Frelon
- Kaman SH-2 Seasprite
- Kamov Ka-25
- Mil Mi-14
- Sikorsky SH-60 Seahawk
- Westland Lynx

Related lists

- List of active United States military aircraft
