= Curtiss XF15C =

1945 prototype fighter aircraft model

XF15C
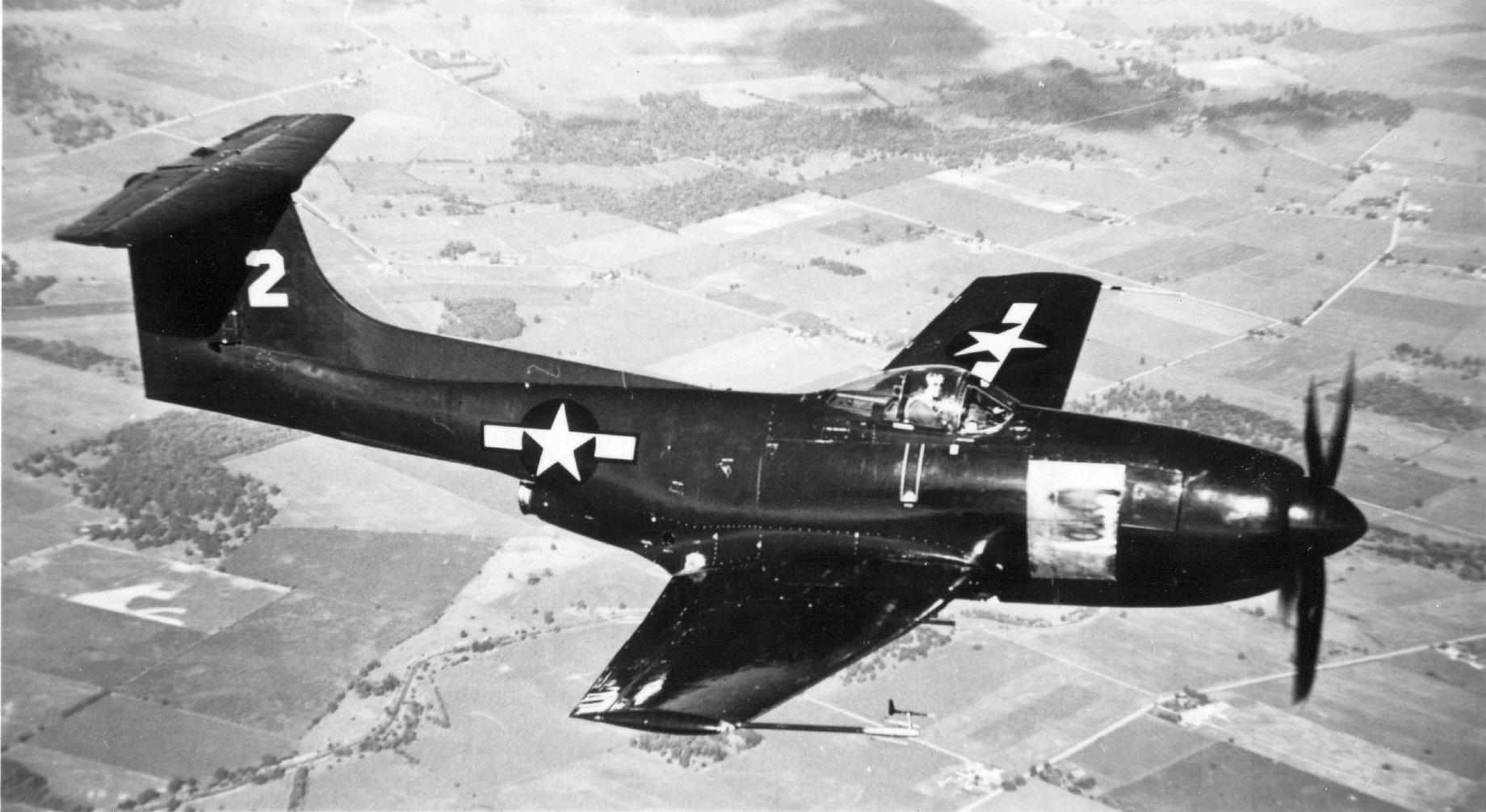
- A XF15C in flight

General information
- Type: Fighter
- National origin: United States
- Manufacturer: Curtiss Aeroplane and Motor Company
- Number built: 3 prototypes

History
- First flight: 27 February 1945

The Curtiss XF15C-1 is a mixed-propulsion (piston and jet-powered) fighter aircraft prototype of the 1940s. Designed and built by the Curtiss Aeroplane and Motor Company, it was one of two similar designs ordered by the United States Navy (USN) before pure-jet aircraft had demonstrated their ability to operate from aircraft carriers and the mixed-propulsion designs were abandoned. Only three prototypes were constructed, the first one having crashed in testing while the second was scrapped and the last survives to this day.

== Background ==
By 1943 the United States Navy became interested in the mixed-power concept for its shipborne fighters. Jet engines of that era had very slow throttle response, which presented a safety concern in the case of a missed approach on an aircraft carrier as the aircraft might not be able to throttle up quickly enough to keep flying after leaving the end of the deck. In addition the jet engine consumed a lot of fuel so a piston engine could provide power while cruising and extend the aircraft's range, while using the turbojet for combat. This led to orders for two mixed-propulsion fighters, the XF15C and the Ryan FR Fireball. The latter aircraft came first and was designed around a 1,425-horsepower (1,063 kW) Wright R-1820 Cyclone piston engine and a 1,600 pounds-force (7,100 N) General Electric J31 turbojet and was intended for use on escort carriers. The XF15C was a much larger aircraft intended to equip the Midway-class aircraft carriers for longer-range missions.

During this time, the Curtiss design team was focused on developing the XF14C, a high-altitude fighter intended to use the liquid-cooled, Lycoming XH-2470 Hyper engine or the Wright R-3350 Duplex-Cyclone radial engine, both of which were still under development. The Lycoming engine proved to be a failure and the high-priority Boeing B-29 Superfortress bomber absorbed the bulk of the Wright engines. By late 1943 Curtiss was convinced that investing more resources into the XF14C would be a waste of time and began to search for alternatives. They decided to compete for the mixed-power fighter role instead and began preliminary design work on a high-performance aircraft that could compete with the Grumman F6F Hellcat and the Vought F4U Corsair using a Pratt & Whitney R-2800 Double Wasp piston engine, and a 2,700-pound-force (12,000 N) Allis-Chalmers J36 turbojet. The Bureau of Aeronautics knew the XF14C program was at a dead end and was amenable to the idea. Curtiss submitted a preliminary proposal in December that was accepted. The bureau was willing to transfer the design team and assets from the XF14C program on that basis and would award a new contract for the XF15C if the final design was acceptable.

Curtiss delivered its final proposal on 1 February 1944; the aircraft's maximum speed with both engines operating was estimated as 485 miles per hour (781 km/h) and a sea-level rate of climb of 4,890 feet per minute (1,490 m/min). Both figures exceeded any aircraft already in service and the bureau issued a procurement directive for three prototypes and an additional airframe for static-load testing on 24 February. Formal contracts for the aircraft followed on 7 April.

== Development and description ==
The XF15C-1 was a single-seat, low-wing monoplane with tricycle landing gear. A 2,100-horsepower (1,600 kW) R-2800-34W radial was mounted in the fighter's nose while a 2,700 lbf (12,000 N) J36 turbojet was mounted in the rear fuselage. It was fed by ducts in each wing root which meant that the wing had to be relatively thick to house the ducts and the inward-retracting main landing gear. To simplify the fuel system, both engines used the same grade of avgas. Two self-sealing fuel tanks were housed in the fuselage, one of 165 US gallons (620 L; 137 imp gal) and the other of 211 US gallons (800 L; 176 imp gal). The cockpit was positioned just forward of the leading edge of the wing and the pilot was provided with a bubble canopy which gave him excellent visibility. The XF15C used a laminar flow airfoil as did the Ryan Fireball. The two-spar wings folded upwards for storage.

The Curtiss aircraft was intended to be armed with four 20-millimeter (0.8 in) autocannon with 200 rounds per gun. They would have been mounted in the center section of the wing, immediately outboard of the air intakes for the jet engine, but no guns were ever fitted to any of the three prototypes. Four 5-inch (127 mm) rockets could be carried under each outer wing panel and two hardpoints were provided under the center section for 1,000 lb (454 kg) bombs; only the right hardpoint was plumbed for a 150 US gal (570 L; 120 imp gal) drop tank. An armor plate was provided behind the pilot's seat and the forward portion of the canopy was made from bulletproof glass.

== Flight testing ==
The first prototype made its maiden flight on 28 February 1945 without the turbojet; the first flight with the jet installed was on 3 May. The aircraft made several trial flights to evaluate handling without the jet running, but it crashed on 8 May while on a landing approach, killing the pilot. The subsequent investigate determined that the XF15C had run out of fuel due to a stuck fuel gauge and a hard-to-see low fuel warning light. The second prototype flew for the first time on 9 July, and was followed by a third prototype in November.

A Curtiss engineer proposed installing a T-tail in June to allow aircraft to be parked closer together and to improve the aircraft's handling and aerodynamics, but both aircraft were completed in the original configuration, albeit fully equipped for carrier operations. The second prototype was transferred to the Naval Air Testing Center at Naval Air Station Patuxent River in October for preliminary evaluation. These revealed serious longitudinal, directional and lateral stability problems. The aircraft returned to the factory in December for further testing and the nose gear could not be lowered during a flight on 18 January 1946 which caused the prototype to make a crash landing that wrecked the propeller and lightly damaged the lower fuselage. Repairs took until 10 April.

However, by October 1946, the Navy had lost interest in the mixed-power concept and cancelled further development.

== Surviving aircraft ==
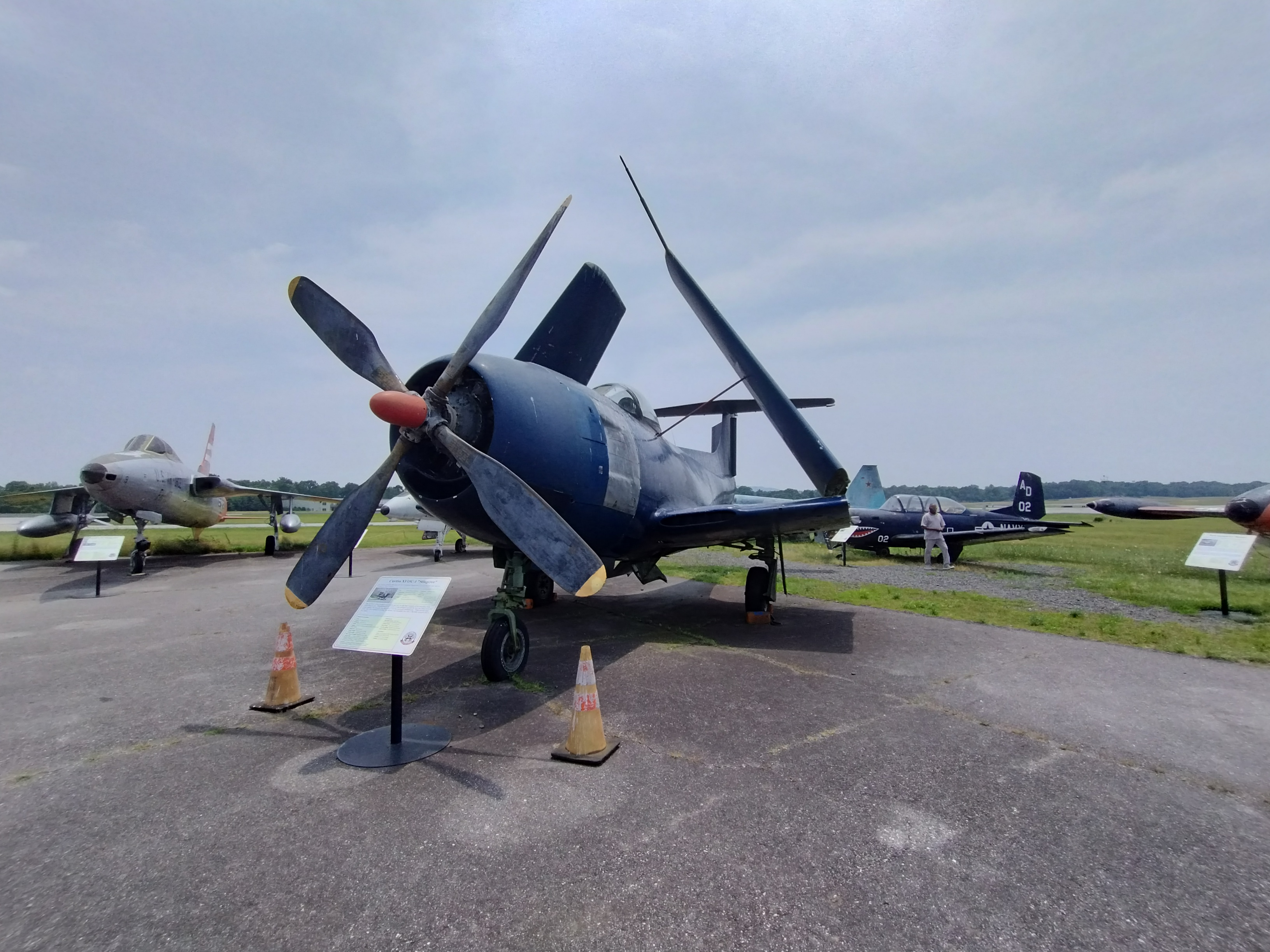
The Curtiss XF15C-1 at the Hickory Air Museum

=== XF15C-1 ===
Of the two remaining prototypes, one was scrapped around 1947, and the other remained in storage until it was released by the Navy for museum display. It was then located at the Bradley Air Museum, later renamed New England Air Museum in Windsor Locks, Connecticut at the Bradley International Airport. It was later relocated to the Quonset Air Museum in North Kingstown, Rhode Island. A part of the roof collapsed because of ice and snow in March 2014, and the museum closed. The sole survivor is now on static display at the Hickory Aviation Museum, in Hickory, North Carolina.

== Specifications (XF15C-1 with the original tail) ==
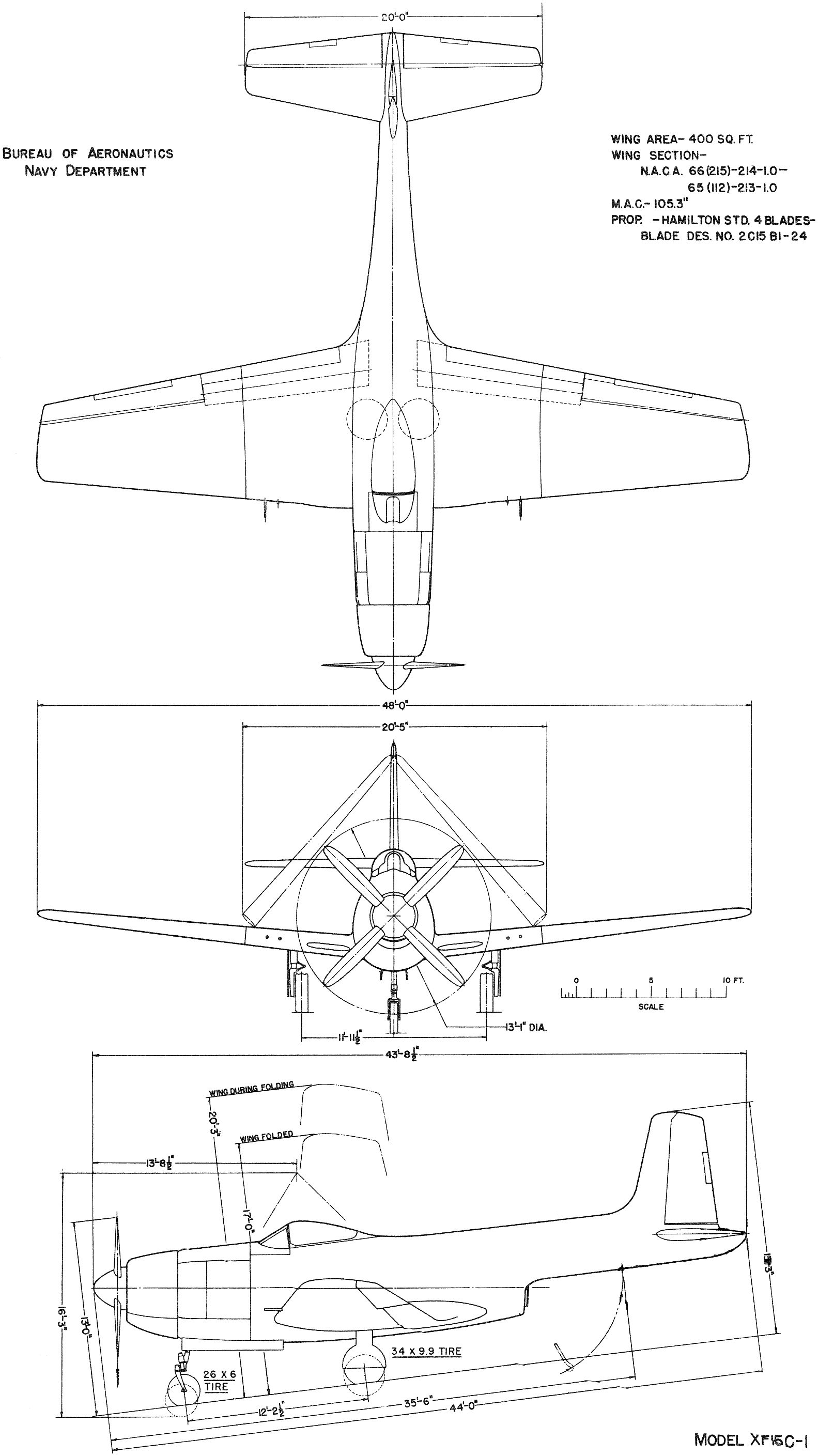
3-view line drawing of the Curtiss XF15C-1

Data from Curtiss Aircraft 1907–1947; Curtiss XF15C-1 "Stingaree"

General characteristics

- Crew: 1
- Length: 44 ft (13 m)
- Wingspan: 48 ft (15 m)
- Width: 20 ft 5 in (6.22 m) wings folded
- Height: 15 ft 3 in (4.65 m) wings spread; 17 ft (5.2 m) wings folded
- Wing area: 400 sq ft (37 m^{2})
- Empty weight: 12,648 lb (5,737 kg)
- Gross weight: 16,630 lb (7,543 kg)
- Max takeoff weight: 18,698 lb (8,481 kg) maximum overload
- Powerplant: 1 × Pratt & Whitney R-2800-34W Double Wasp 18-cyl. air-cooled radial piston engine, 2,100 hp (1,600 kW)
- Powerplant: 1 × Allis-Chalmers J36 centrifugal-flow turbojet, 2,700 lbf (12 kN) thrust
- Propellers: 4-bladed Hamilton Standard constant-speed propeller, 13 ft 1 in (3.99 m) diameter

Performance

- Maximum speed: 469 mph (755 km/h, 408 kn) both engines at 25,300 ft (7,700 m)
- Range: 1,385 mi (2,229 km, 1,204 nmi)
- Service ceiling: 41,800 ft (12,700 m)
- Rate of climb: 5,020 ft/min (25.5 m/s)

Armament

- Guns: 4 × wing-mounted 20 mm (0.8 in) cannon with 200 rpg
- Rockets: 8 × 5-inch (127 mm) rockets under wings
- Bombs: 2 × 1,000 lb (454 kg) bombs

== See also ==
Aircraft of comparable role, configuration, and era

- Ryan FR Fireball
- Mikoyan-Gurevich I-250
- Sukhoi Su-5

== Bibliography ==
- Andrews, Hal (1977). "End of a Line... The Last Curtiss Navy Fighter". Air Enthusiast (3): 98–108. ISSN 0143-5450.
- Bowers, Peter M. (1987) [1979]. Curtiss Aircraft 1907-1947. Naval Institute Press. ISBN 0-87021-152-8.
- Buttler, Tony (2024). American Experimental Fighters of WWII: The Pursuit of Excellence. Crécy Publishing. ISBN 978-1-80035-310-7.
- Bedford, Alan (May–June 1999). "Early American Carrier Jets: Evolving Jet Operations with the US Fleet, Part One". Air Enthusiast (81): 13–19. ISSN 0143-5450.
- Ginter, Steve (2024). Curtiss XF15C-1 "Stingaree". Naval Fighters. Vol. 119. Steve Ginter Books. ISBN 979-8-9899509-2-8.
- Green, William; Gordon Swanborough. The Complete Book of Fighters. Godalming, UK: Salamander Books. pp. 143–144.
