= Quonset Air Museum =

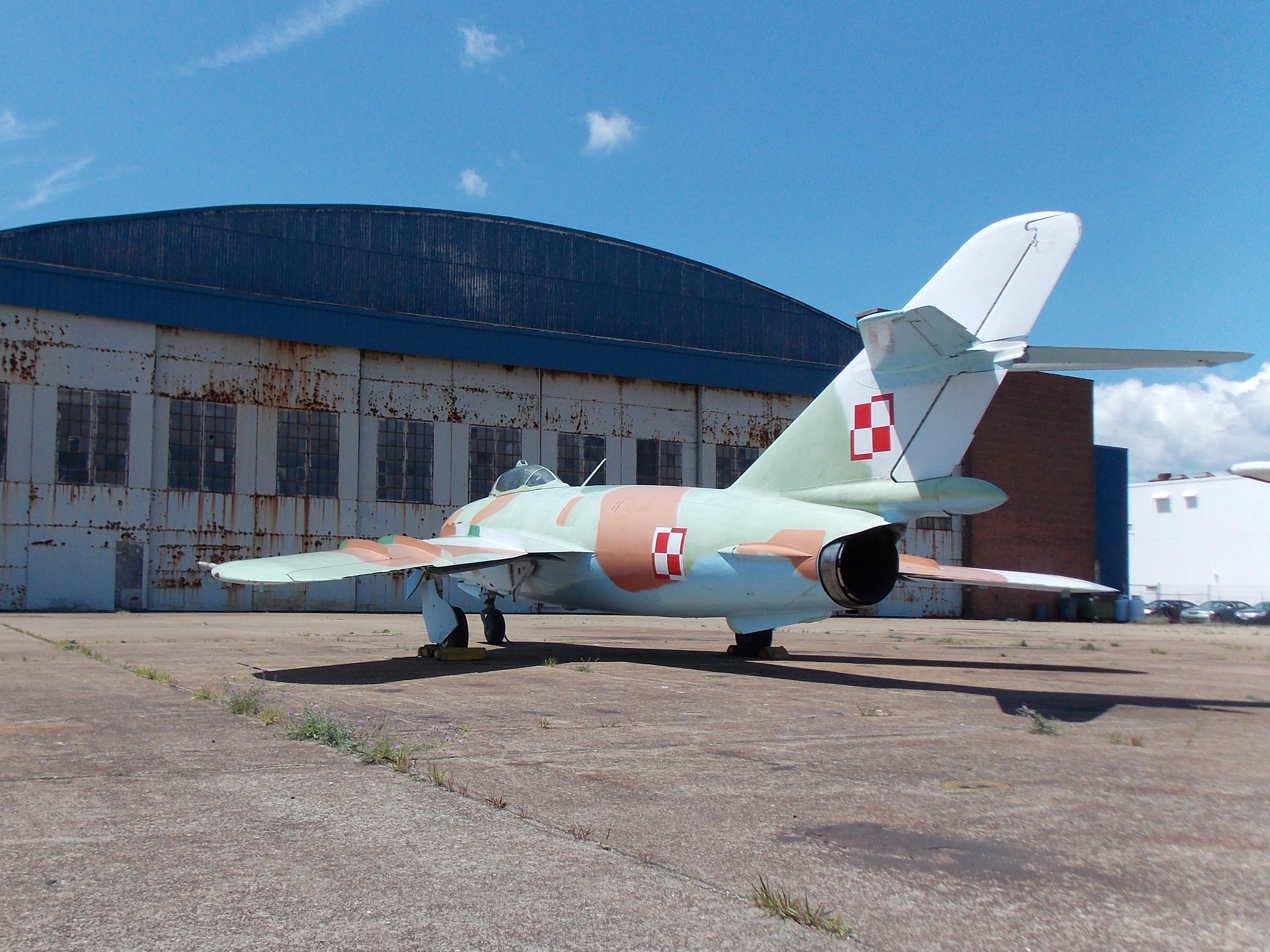
- MiG-17 on display at the Quonset Air Museum.

- Location within Rhode Island
- Established: 1992
- Dissolved: 2015
- Location: North Kingstown, Rhode Island
- Coordinates: 41.589°N 71.416°W
- Type: Aviation museum
- Founders: William E. Sheridan; Larry Webster
- President: David Payne
- Curator: David Payne
- Website: www.quonsetairmuseum.com

The Quonset Air Museum was an aviation museum located at Quonset Point Air National Guard Station in North Kingstown, Rhode Island. The museum originated as the "Rhode Island Aviation Heritage Association", founded by Robin Foote who became the initial chairman and president of the Quonset Air Museum.

The museum's collection included military vehicles, missiles, aircraft and over 5,000 smaller aviation artifacts. An extensive archive of books, magazines, manuals, photos, documents and blueprints was preserved within the museum.

Notable aircraft in the collection included the last surviving Curtiss XF15C mixed propulsion prototype and a twin tail C-1A Trader. This one of a kind aircraft had been fitted with twin tails and radome (but without associated electronics) to serve the aerodynamic prototype for the E-1 Tracer Electronic Counter Measure aircraft. This C-1A has the distinction of being the last aircraft to fly from Naval Air Station Quonset Point upon its closure in 1974.

== History ==
The museum recovered an F6F-5 Hellcat from Martha's Vineyard on 4 December 1993. It became the subject of a court battle after the U.S. Navy claimed that the aircraft had been salvaged without their permission. Eventually, a settlement was reached where the museum received the aircraft on loan from the Navy.

An Antonov An-2 at the museum was given to the Antonov Foundation in 2004. The following year David H. Payne Sr. became the museum president.

The museum occupied Painting Hangar #488 located at what was once the Naval Air Station Quonset Point. This 50,000 sq. ft. facility was one of only three existing specialized wood and brick hangars built during WWII. Heavy snowfall in March 2015 partially collapsed the building's roof and the hangar was condemned.

In January 2016, plans for a new museum were announced. The museum was originally supposed to leave by April 2, but it was given an extension. Later, in June, a $4 million request for state funding failed to materialize. On December 16, 2016, it was announced that the museum would not reopen. Although many aircraft in the collection have been transferred to other museums, the museum's P2V was scrapped in May 2018, as it was too large to move.

== Formerly on display ==
- Bell AH-1S Cobra 66-15317
- Bell OH-58A Kiowa 70-15117
- Bell UH-1 Huey 66-15083
- Curtiss XF15C 01215
- Douglas AD-5W Skyraider 135188
- Douglas A-4M Skyhawk, BuNo 158148
- Douglas F3D-2Q Skyknight 124620
- FV433 Abbot SPG
- General Motors TBM-3E Avenger 53914
- Grumman A-6E Intruder 155629
- Grumman C-1A Trader 136792
- Grumman F-14 Tomcat
- Grumman F6F Hellcat 3/4 scale hand built
- Grumman F6F Hellcat 70185
- Hughes OH-6 Cayuse
- Lockheed P2V Neptune 131427
- LTV A-7D Corsair II 75-0408
- M35 Recovery Truck
- McDonnell Douglas AV-8B Harrier II
- McDonnell Douglas F-4A Phantom II
- Mikoyan-Gurevich MiG-17F
- MIM-14 Nike-Hercules
- Sikorsky SH-3H Sea King 149738
- Silkworm missile
- Type 74 37 mm AA gun
- ZPU-4 Type 56 AA gun
