= First Flights with Neil Armstrong =

- Genre: Documentary
- Directed by: Neil Hollander
- Presented by: Neil Armstrong
- Country of origin: United States
- Original language: English
- No. of seasons: 3
- No. of episodes: 39

Production
- Executive producers: Mark H. Tuttle; Peter Maris
- Running time: 30 minutes per episode
- Production companies: PMT, Ltd.

Original release
- Network: A&E
- Release: September 1991

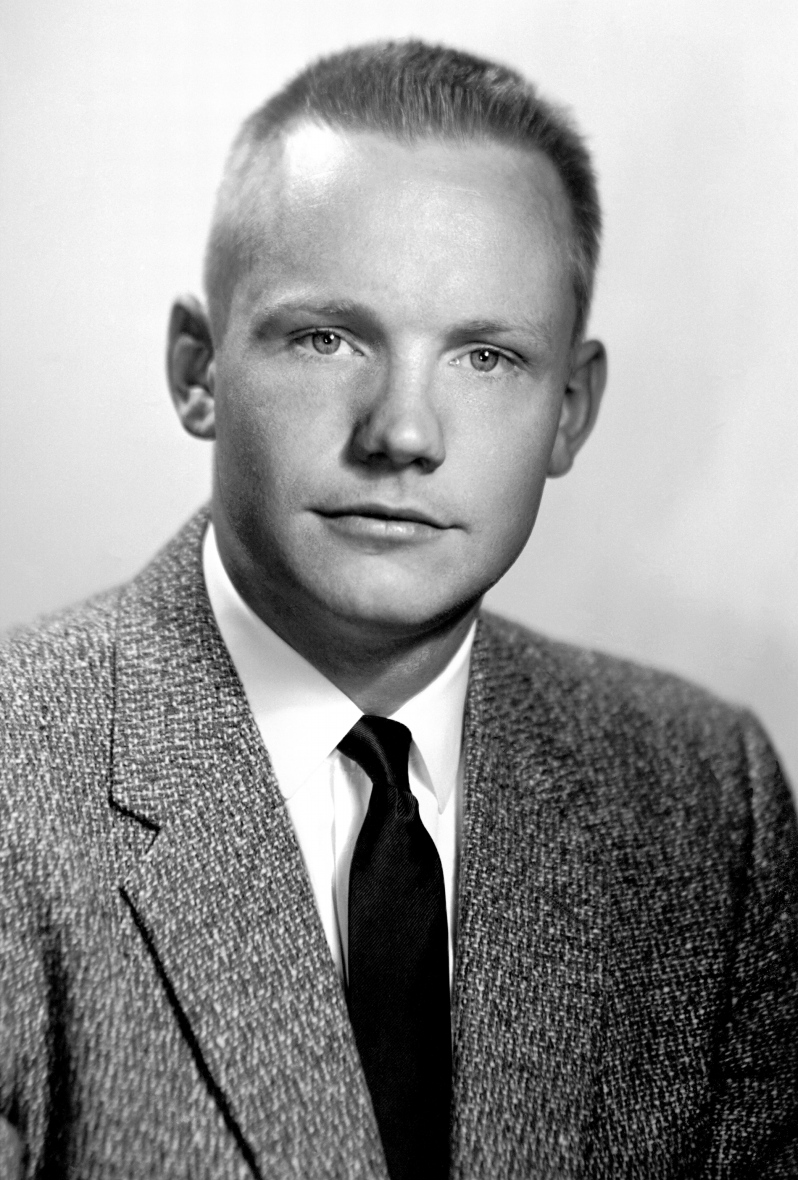
Armstrong, 26, as a test pilot

First Flights was a half-hour televised aviation history documentary series. The series premiered on September 25, 1991, on A&E Networks and ran for three seasons. It was hosted by former test pilot and astronaut Neil Armstrong, the first person to walk on the Moon.

The series initially aired Wednesdays at 9 p.m. on A&E in the U.S. The series focused on the technological history of aviation, from early balloons and gliders through war-time and mass commercial aviation, to experimental hypersonic flight at the edge of space. In the series, Neil Armstrong interviewed pilots and aerospace engineers. Archival footage and vintage aircraft were used to recreate historic takeoffs.

== Episodes ==
Episodes of First Flights with Neil Armstrong are listed below in the original A&E Networks broadcast order. Season 1 traces the development of aviation technology from balloons to early post-WWII jet aircraft. Season 2 continues the story of atmospheric flight to the edge of space in the 1990s. Neil Armstrong had previously flown several aircraft featured in Season 2 during his long career as a NASA experimental test pilot in Edwards, CA. Season 3 focuses on the development of particular technologies within the broader field of aviation.

=== Season 1 ===
No. overall	No. in season	Title	Original release date
1	1	"By The Seat of Their Pants"	September 25, 1991
This episode focuses on public spectacles and the development of improved fly machines during the pioneer era of aviation. Several of these early aircraft are demonstrated by Cole Palen at the Rhinebeck Aerodrome.: Featured Aircraft: Blériot XI (1909), Hanriot (1910), Curtiss Pusher Model D (1911).; More ...: Shooting Locations: Old Rhinebeck Aerodrome, Rhinebeck, NY; Planes of Fame Air Museum, Chino, CA; Featured Pilots: Cole Palen, John Barker; Archival Aircraft: Lilienthal gliders, Wright Glider, Wright Flyer, Voisin 1907 biplane, Curtiss Model D Headless Pusher; Aviators: Otto Lilienthal, Orville Wright, Wilbur Wright, Alberto Santos-Dumont, Louis Blériot, Glenn Curtiss, Baroness de Laroche, Henri Farman, Lincoln Beachey; Aircraft Companies: Hanriot Brothers, Curtiss; Engines: fan-type Anzani engine, Hall-Scott engine; Aviation Firsts: 1903–Wrights: first controlled crewed flight; 1906–Alberto Santos Dumont: first European flight; 1908–Henri Farman: flew first complete circle, first flight between two cities; 1909–Louis Blériot: crossed the English Channel; 1909–First international air competition, held at Rheims, France; 1910–French Baroness de Laroche: first woman to earn her pilot's license; 1910–Flights in Switzerland, Portugal, across Alps and Lake Geneva; 1910–first night flights and first radios introduced; 1911–Curtiss Pusher: First airplane flown off the deck of a ship
2	2	"Every Day a Better Design"	October 2, 1991
This episode examines the separation of aviators into two groups: engineers who designed and built aircraft and pilots who tried to fly them. Aviation during this period mostly offered sport for the rich and air shows for the public.: Featured Aircraft: Nieuport 11 (1914), Albatros D.V (replica), Caudron G.III (1914).; More ...: Shooting Locations: Old Rhinebeck Aerodrome, Rhinebeck, NY; Planes of Fame Air Museum, Chino, CA; Featured Pilots: Cole Palen, John Barker, and Gene DeMarco; Archival Aircraft: Blériot XI, Deperdussin Monocoque, Nieuport 17, Hanriot, Fokker D.VII, Morane-Saulnier, Fokker Spider, Fokker triplane; Aviators and Builders: Adolphe Pégoud, Louis Blériot, Lt. Peter Nesterov, Louis Béchereau, Claude Grahame-White, Orville Wright, Marcel Brindejonc des Moulinais, Roland Garros, Anthony Fokker, Hellmuth Hirth, Baron Manfred von Richehofen (the Red Baron); Aircraft Companies: Blériot Aircraft, Deperdussin, Nieuport, Fokker Aeroplanbau, Albatros-Werke; Engines and Components: Gnome rotary engine; Le Rhône rotary engine; ailerons; Aviation Firsts: 1913: First to cross the Mediterranean; first to link two continents 1913: First aerial loops – over Russia by Pyotr Nesterov and over France by Adolphe Pégoud
3	3	"Flying Aces, War in the Air"	October 9, 1991
During the First World War airplanes were used first for reconnaissance, later as a weapon.: Featured Aircraft: S.E.5a (replica), Sopwith 9700 1½ Strutter, Fokker Dr.I triplane (replica).; More ...: Shooting Locations: Old Rhinebeck Aerodrome, Rhinebeck, NY; Planes of Fame Air Museum, Chino, CA; Rialto Municipal Airport, Rialto, CA; Featured Pilots: Javier Arango and Chuck Wentworth.; Archival Aircraft: Dirigibles, Morane- Saulnier Bullet, Fokker Eindecker, Pfalz D.III, Albatros D.III, Spad, S.E.5 fighters, Sopwith Camel, Sopwith Pup; Aviators & Flight Squads: Roland Garros, Georges Guynemer, French Stork Squadron, Eddie Rickenbacker, 94th Aero Squadron, Albert Ball, James McCudden, Edward "Mick" Mannock, Charlie Meyers, Norman Macmillan; Builders & Aircraft Companies: Louis Béchereau, Armand Deperdussin, Royal Aircraft Factory (Great Britain), Anthony Fokker, Sopwith Aviation Company, Avro; Engines, Components, & Weapons: bullet deflectors, Spandau machine guns, V-8 Hispano-Suiza engine, 37mm Hotchkiss Cannon, dive brakes, variable-incidence tailplane, twin Vickers guns, airfoil
4	4	"Flying Entrepreneurs"	October 16, 1991
After the First World War, veteran pilots performed dogfighting aerobatics for spectators and barnstormers became went into business carrying mail and passengers.: Featured Aircraft: New Standard D-25, de Havilland Tiger Moth, Stearman PT-17.; More ...: Shooting Locations: Old Rhinebeck Aerodrome, Rhinebeck, NY; Planes of Fame Air Museum, Chino, CA; Rialto Municipal Airport, Rialto, CA; Featured Pilots: Cole Palen, John Barker, Javier Arango and Chuck Wentworth.; Archival Aircraft: Vickers Vimy, Douglas World Cruiser, Farman Goliath, Fokker T-2, Curtiss Jenny, Standard, DH-4: Aviators: Sir Ross Smith, Captain John Alcock, Lt. Brown, Charles Nungesser, François Coli, Lt. Erik Nelson, Lowell Smith, Geoffrey de Havilland, Lt. John Arthur Macready, Lt. Oakley G. Kelly, Carl Dixon, Walter Beech, Charles Lindbergh, Wiley Post, Roscoe Turner, Clyde Cessna, Ivan Gates, Johnny Miller, Dean Smith; Builders & Aircraft Companies: Charles Day, Farman Aviation Works, Geoffrey de Havilland, Avro, Bristol, Hawker, Stearman Aircraft, Standard Aircraft Corporation; Engine Companies: Daimler, Curtiss-Wright, Pratt & Whitney; Engines: Hall-Scott engine, de Havilland Gipsy, radial engine; Aviation Firsts: First England to Australia flight — Sir Ross Smith in a Vickers Vimy First non-stop flight across the Atlantic — Alcock & Brown First flight around the world — Nelson & Smith using Douglas World Cruisers First non-stop coast to coast U.S. mail service — 1923
5	5	"Bigger is Better"	October 23, 1991
This episode follows the inter-war development of commercial passenger travel, when luxurious flying boats were used at a time of few runways. Aircraft like the DC-3 helped to make commercial passenger travel viable.: Featured Aircraft: Waco QCF (Staggerwing), Consolidated PBY5a, Douglas DC-3.; More ...: Shooting Locations: Museum of Flying, Santa Monica, CA; Rialto Municipal Airport, Rialto, CA; Planes of Fame Air Museum, Chino, CA; Featured Pilots: Don Madonna, Richard Grigsby, Robert Franks, Steve Hinton, John Maloney, and Javier Arango; Archival Aircraft: Farman Goliath, Junkers Ju 52/3M, Fokker F.VII Trimotor, flying boats, Dornier Wal, Dornier Do X, Dornier Do 26, Short Empire flying boats, Savoia-Marchetti S.55, Sikorsky S-38, Fokker F.10, Douglas DC-1, Douglas DC-2, Douglas C-47; Aviators: Richard E. Byrd, Kingsford Smith, Charles Lindbergh, Roscoe Creed; Builders & Aircraft Companies: Hugo Junkers, Handley-Page, De Havilland, Anthony Fokker, Henry Ford, Walter Beech, Clyde Cessna, Weaver, Clayton Brukner , Elwood Junkin, Glenn Curtiss, Claude Dornier, Short Brothers, China Clipper, Consolidated PBY Catalina, Donald Douglas McDonnell-Douglas Aircraft; Airlines: Pan American World Airways, Trans World Airlines; Aviation Firsts: First flight over the North Pole — Richard E. Byrd First nonstop flight between Australia and the United States — Kingsford Smith First successful passenger aircraft built in America - Ford Trimotor "Tin Goose"
6	6	"Fighters Between the War"	October 30, 1991
Nazi Germany and Imperial Japan changed aerial warfare with new aircraft designs.: Featured Aircraft: North American Harvard Mark 6, Curtiss P-40 Warhawk.; More ...: Shooting Locations: Planes of Fame Air Museum, Chino, CA; Museum of Flying, Santa Monica, CA; Featured Pilots: Don Madonna, and John Maloney; Archival Aircraft: Hawker Hart Bomber, Hawker Fury, Me-109, Mitsubishi Type 96, Zero, BT-14, AT-6, P-38, P-51, SNJ; Aviators: Billy Mitchell, Hermann Göring, Hermann Steiner, Charles Lindbergh, 'Hap' Arnold; Builders & Aircraft Companies: Hawker Aircraft, Willy Messerschmitt, Mitsubishi; Engines: Pratt and Whitney 1340, Allison engines; Events: Sinking of the battleship Ostfriesland
7	7	"Testing Under Fire"	November 6, 1991
This episode looks at the German Luftwaffe with its Messerschmitt Bf 109, the British Spitfire and the Battle of Britain, and the U.S. entry into the Second World War with its P-38 Lightning.: Featured aircraft: Supermarine Mark 14 Spitfire, Lockheed P-38 Lightning; More ...: Shooting Location: Planes of Fame Air Museum, Chino, CA
8	8	"New Generation of Flyers"	November 13, 1991
This episode looks at developments leading up to the invasion of France, and how the P-51 Mustang and the P-47 Thunderbolt helped to change how people fought.: Featured Aircraft: North American P-51 Mustang, Republic P-47 Thunderbolt.; More ...: Shooting Location: Planes of Fame Air Museum, Chino, CA
9	9	"Air Battles at Sea"	November 20, 1991
This episode examines carrier-based aircraft during the Second World War by following the development of the Japanese Zero, the Grumman Hellcat, and the Corsair, and discusses how designers, separated by oceans, weighed weight, range, and maneuverability in their efforts to respond to each other's developments.: Featured Aircraft: Mitsubishi A6M Zero, Grumman F6F Hellcat, Vought F4U Corsair; More ...: Shooting Location: Planes of Fame Air Museum, Chino, CA.
10	10	"Air Forts of the War"	November 27, 1991
This episode looks at different approaches to bombing. The British Lancaster flew bombing missions at night to evade enemy fire. Americans added armor plating and 13 machine guns to the B-17 in order to fly in daylight, which reduced the craft's payload but afforded greater accuracy.: Featured aircraft: Boeing B-17 Flying Fortress, North American B-25 Mitchell, Grumman TBF Avenger; More ...: Shooting Locations: Planes of Fame Air Museum, Chino, CA; Rialto Municipal Airport, Rialto, CA; Aero Trader, Chino, CA.
11	11	"First Jets"	December 4, 1991
Germany and England developed jet-engine craft in the 1940s. The British Meteor was used to intercept Germany’s V-1 flying bombs, Germany’s Messerschmitt Me 262 had a limited range, and the American Shooting Star had an alarming accident rate until it was equipped with the British Goblin engine.: Featured aircraft: Lockheed T-33, North American T-28 Trojan.; More ...: Shooting Locations: Planes of Fame Air Museum, Chino, CA; Museum of Flying, Santa Monica, CA
12	12	"First to Fly"	December 11, 1991
Hot air balloons grew in size, culminating in huge pre-war dirigibles that remain the largest aircraft ever built.: Featured Aircraft: hot air balloon; Airship Industries Skyship 600 (Fuji blimp).; More ...: Shooting Locations: Chino, CA; Stone Mountain, Georgia; Long Beach, CA
13	13	"Workhorse of the Sky: The Turboprop"	December 18, 1991
A turboprop is a gas turbine engine, but instead of using the jet exhaust to push the aircraft, the turboprop engine drives propellers. Turboprops can make short take off and landings, and have been used for passenger transportation and long range air cargo and military transport.: Featured Aircraft: Fokker 50, Lockheed C-130 Hercules; More ...: Shooting Locations: Planes of Fame Air Museum, Chino, CA; Fokker Services, Hoeksteen, NL; Lockheed Martin Aeronautics, Marietta, GA

=== Season 2 ===
No. overall	No. in season	Title	Original release date
14	1	"The Helicopter: From Dreams to Reality"	March 4, 1992
The development of helicopters is chronicled from Da Vinci’s drawings, through Cierva and Pitcairn’s autogyros, to Sikorsky, Bell, and others whose post war helicopters vied for the civilian market. As a crop duster during an agricultural crisis, and in the Korean War, the helicopter proved to be a practical flying machine.: Featured Aircraft: Pitcairn Autogyro, Bell-47 & 47B, Aérospatiale Gazelle
15	2	"Airlines: Passengers Join the Jet Age"	March 11, 1992
After World War II, jet aircraft technology used for bombing and military transport was quickly applied to large passenger aircraft. Spared the wartime devastation of the aviation industry in Europe, Americans soon dominated the skies.: Featured Aircraft: Lockheed Constellation, Douglas DC-8
16	3	"The Big Bombers"	March 18, 1992
Born of a fear of communism and a vision to keep the peace with massive nuclear deterrence, the American Strategic Air Command possessed the largest, fastest piston engine bombers of the period. While designers and engineers struggled with structural challenges, pilots and crews struggled with the increasing complexity of flying these gigantic machines.: Featured Aircraft: Boeing B-29 Superfortress, Boeing B-52 Stratofortress
17	4	"Jet Fighters: Wings of Lightning"	March 25, 1992
The U.S. and Russia channeled massive funding into the development of fighters with fantastic speeds and high tech weapons, in which computers became crucial flying aids. Fighters were developed without guns, since they would be firing guided missiles beyond visual range. But before long a new generation of highly maneuverable dog-fighting jets was needed.: Featured Aircraft: McDonnell F-101 Voodoo, General Dynamics F-16 Fighting Falcon, McDonnell Douglas F-15 Eagle
18	5	"General Aviation: Barnstormers to Businessmen"	April 1, 1992
Flying for sport, business, agriculture and photographic survey, a fleet of mostly single engine light aircraft comprised a fast growing segment of aviation. The technological inventions in general aviation are usually not state of the art, but rather clever ways of using existing technology to make affordable aircraft for private owners.: Featured Aircraft: Beechcraft Bonanza, IAI Westwind business jet
19	6	"Supersonic Bombers: The Elusive Search"	April 8, 1992
At the height of the Cold War in the 1960s, the U.S. and Soviet Union raced to build huge supersonic bombers capable of delivering nuclear payloads. High costs and the accuracy of high speed cruise missiles changed priorities, and the U.S. bombers developed in the 1980s were subsonic: the low-flying, radar evading B-1B and the B-2 Stealth Bomber.: Featured Aircraft: North American XB-70 Valkyrie, General Dynamics F-111, B-1B
20	7	"Locusts of War"	April 15, 1992
Already proven effective in transport and rescue, the helicopter took on an offensive role in Vietnam. Modern helicopter gunships are equipped with high-tech systems including night vision and anti-tank weapons.: Featured Aircraft: Bell UH-1 Iroquois “Huey,” Bell AH-1 Cobra gunship, McDonnell Douglas AH-64 Apache
21	8	"Mass Transit in the Skies"	April 29, 1992
During the 1960s, the general population embraced air travel and larger aircraft were needed for the growing airlines. While jumbo jets ruled long-haul passenger transport, a whole spectrum of narrow body jets competed for the smaller routes.: Featured Aircraft: McDonnell Douglas MD-11, Fokker 100
22	9	"Flying Lite: Gliders and Ultralights"	May 6, 1992
Space age materials and modern aerodynamic designs come together in aircraft for those who find exhilaration flying low and slow – whether powered by small engines or sailing on air currents alone.: Featured Aircraft: Grob G109 motor glider, Grob G103a Twin II sailplane, Schweizer SGS 2-32 glider
23	10	"Attack Aircraft"	May 13, 1992
When a fighter or bomber strikes ground forces, it is acting as an attack aircraft. Many fighters can play this role, but recent wars have shown the value of dedicated attack aircraft, designed to hit hard and survive extensive battle damage.: Featured Aircraft: Douglas AD-6 Skyraider, A-7 Corsair, Fairchild Republic A-10 Thunderbolt II “Warthog,” Lockheed F-117 Nighthawk Stealth Fighter
24	11	"Higher than the Sky and Faster than the Eye"	May 20, 1992
From the earliest days of flight the military used aircraft to look behind enemy lines. After the top secret U-2 was shot down over Russia, Lockheed developed the SR-71. Flying at Mach 3 near the edge of space, it could outfly missiles.: Featured Aircraft: Lockheed U-2 version TR-1A, SR-71 Blackbird
25	12	"Experiments in Flight"	June 3, 1992
Chuck Yeager’s flight through the “sound barrier” in the X-1 set the stage for the U.S. experimental X-program, a systematic exploration of new ideas and obstacles in aviation. Pilots flew at the edge of technical knowledge in untried, untested aircraft.: Featured Aircraft: Grumman X-29
26	13	"Rocket Aircraft"	June 10, 1992
In the 1920s, aircraft designers began searching for ways to incorporate the powerful propulsion of rockets into their flying machines. Efforts to harness and control rocket propulsion resulted in many failures but also some dramatic successes.: Featured Aircraft: X-15, NASA Gulfstream jet modified as a Space Shuttle landing simulator

=== Season 3 ===
No. overall	No. in season	Title	Original release date
27	1	"Whirling Wings: Evolution of the Rotorhead"	September 8, 1993
From Cierva's breakthrough in autogyro design, to the state-of-the-art BK-117, the heart of the helicopter story has been the rotorhead. Early helicopters were complex, dangerous flying machines, prone to failure. For the men and women who took the controls, concentration and daring were essential.: Featured Aircraft: Pitcairn autogyro, German BK-117, Navy Seahawk
28	2	"Water Birds: Floatplanes and Flying Boats"	September 15, 1993
By the 1930s, flying boats – massive, airborne ocean liners – opened up global routes for passenger service, while the floatplanes entering the Schneider Trophy races were the fastest, most innovative flying machines in existence.: Featured Aircraft: Sikorsky VS-44 flying boat, Supermarine S.6 racing seaplane, de Havilland Canada DHC-2 Beaver floatplane, de Havilland Canada DHC-6 Twin Otter
29	3	"Jump to the Sky: Jet VTOL"	September 22, 1993
Conventional airplanes need large runways for takeoff and landing, a limitation that worried defense planners. As turbine engines became lighter, vertical take-off and landing (VTOL) aircraft became possible. These craft could take off and land vertically, yet fly with the speed of jets.: Featured Aircraft: Ryan X-13 Vertijet, Harrier V/STOL Jump Jet
30	4	"Tail First Flying: the Canard"	September 29, 1993
When the small tail surface wings which enable an airplane to go up or down are moved to the front, they are called canards. It is a technology as old as crewed flight — the Wrights used canards on their early airplanes. Canards were rarely used after the first World War until computer technology provided the control needed to make the technology feasible.: Featured Aircraft: Piaggio Avanti EVO, Curtiss-Wright XP-55 Ascender, North American Aviation XB-70 Valkyrie, Scaled Composites ARES
31	5	"First Around The World"	October 6, 1993
Many times in aviation history the ultimate test of aircraft and pilot was to fly around the world. Competition and showmanship always played a part, but in the end it was the mental and physical endurance of the men and women who climbed into the cockpit that made success possible.: Featured Aircraft: Douglas World Cruiser, Wiley Post's Lockheed Vega “Winnie May,” Lockheed Model 10 Electra, Rutan Voyager
32	6	"Flying Blind"	October 20, 1993
In the early days of flying, instrumentation was crude. A weighted silk stocking tied to a strut could help the pilot gauge his airspeed. Wartime challenged pilots to learn the techniques of blind flying. Today, pilots use orbiting satellites to pinpoint their position, and complex autopilots enable an aircraft to fly itself.: Featured Aircraft: Supermarine Spitfire, Boeing 747-400, Link Trainer
33	7	"Flying Wings"	October 27, 1993
In their quest for flight efficiency, some designers thought the ideal shape would be just a wing, nothing else, flying through the air. Though successful development of flying wings has often proved illusive, Northrop's designs proved feasibility, and the B-2 Stealth Bomber brought the configuration into production.: Featured Aircraft: Northrop N-1M "Jeep" flying wing, Northrop YB-35, Northrop YB-49, Northrop Grumman B-2 Spirit Stealth Bomber
34	8	"Flight Control: Wing Warping to Fly-by-Wire"	November 3, 1993
Two years after the first crewed flight, the Wrights mastered control sufficiently to fly the first circle – a major aviation advance that went almost unnoticed. By World War II, the first hydraulically boosted controls were invented, enabling pilots to fly aircraft weighing more than 100,000 pounds without the muscles of a co pilot. Once digital signals succeeded in maneuvering spacecraft, computerized fly-by-wire technology for aircraft was not far behind.: Featured Aircraft: Wright Flyer, Beachey Little Looper, F4U Corsair, Vought F-8 Crusader, Sikorsky S-76 Shadow helicopter
35	9	"Flash Of Glory: Aerial Combat Enters The Jet Age"	November 10, 1993
During WWII, the Germans introduced the Messerschmitt 262, and the British the Gloster Meteor. With these first operational jet fighters, a new era in aerial combat had begun. As jet met jet in the skies over Korea, the MiG-15 proved Russia to be a major power in jet aircraft development.: Featured Aircraft: German Messerschmitt Me 262, British Gloster Meteor, Russian Mikoyan-Gurevich MiG-15
36	10	"Flying The Mail"	November 17, 1993
Airmail pioneers demonstrated to a public already infatuated with flying, that airplanes had a bright commercial future. They led the way for the great commercial ventures that would one day span the globe. The variety of aircraft was dazzling, but conditions were harsh and pilots had to be hardy and brave to risk flying the mail.: Featured Aircraft: Bleriot, Douglas M-2 Mailplane, Pitcairn PA-6 & PA-7 Mailwings, Ford Trimotor Tin Goose
37	11	"Backyard Fliers: An Airplane In Every Garage"	November 24, 1993
In the 1920s when just about anyone could afford a car, interest grew in a safe, inexpensive airplane that anyone could fly. Convenience went a step further in roadable aircraft – vehicles that could travel the highways, then convert to an airplane for the rest of the journey. The airplane has never attained the practicality of the automobile for family travel, but modern aviation offers exciting opportunities for the amateur flyer.: Featured Aircraft: Ford Flying Flivver, Taylor Aerocar, kitbuilt pusher amphibian, Bede Jet Corp BD-10 kitbuilt jet, Rutan Model 61 LongEZ
38	12	"First In Speed: Air Racing"	December 1, 1993
From the early years of flight until the late 1930s, air racing was the single most important testing ground for engineering advancements. It provided a breathtaking combination of daredevil risk taking and technological innovation.: Featured Aircraft: Gee Bee Model R, P-51 Mustang, Stiletto racer
39	13	"Propellers: Wings With A Twist"	December 8, 1993
The Wright brothers realized that a propeller was a rotating wing – giving it a twist made it practical. By the mid 1930s, variable pitch and NACA research revolutionized propeller design. With the coming of the jet age, propellers fell out of favor for large aircraft. But designers soon realized that a fast turboprop with an advanced propeller could be more efficient than the best jetliners.: Featured Aircraft: Wright Flyer, scimitar prop Stiletto, NASA Gulfstream 2 propfan testbed

== Production ==
During pre-production, the series was titled Test Pilot and the actor Cliff Robertson, who had portrayed the astronaut Buzz Aldrin in Return to Earth, was cast to host the show. Robertson backed out after the filming of flying sequences and pilot interviews had begun in England, the Netherlands, and the United States. A&E agreed to allow the host to be changed, "as long as it was someone of at least the stature of Cliff Robertson." The show's producer obtained a list of astronauts and pilots from the Society of Experimental Test Pilots, and being "naive enough to ... start at the top," approached Armstrong, asking if he would be interested. "The fact that [the show's producer] ran his company out of a small Pennsylvania town and not New York or L.A. may have appealed to the wary Armstrong," Michael Cascio, who supervised the show at A&E, later recalled; Armstrong accepted. Amstrong disapproved of the show's title and, after considering other possibilities, including Thumbs Up!, the producers settled on First Flights.

When the show premiered in the fall of 1991, a television reviewer criticized Armstrong's limited involvement onscreen, and Armstrong agreed to a larger role, conducting discussions with pilots and historians, and flying the aircraft.

== Release ==
The series aired during prime time on A&E until 1993. After subsequently running on the History Channel, First Flights was syndicated to PBS stations across the United States and Canada. The series also appeared on Bridges TV. The series has been broadcast globally, including in the United Kingdom on Discovery Europe, the Netherlands on Evangelische Omroep, and various channels throughout the Middle East and North Africa. Columbia House and A&E Home Video marketed selected episodes on VHS. The complete series has been released by Amazon, where it is available to customers with an Amazon Prime subscription.

== Reception ==
Reviews for pre-released "advanced look" episodes were mixed. Jay Sharbutt, the senior television writer for The Associated Press, called the series "disappointing" because it did not give enough time to Armstrong. Reviews of subsequent episodes and the second season were positive. Brian Taves (fr) described the series as "an exemplary history of aviation. ...The selection and use of the historical footage is ideal and edited with unusual skill." "The show was an immersive experience with Armstrong looking at — and ultimately trying out — historic aircraft that were risky to fly," Michael Cascio, who supervised the show at A&E, later wrote. "It had the same appeal, in a milder form, as later docureality shows [and] helped establish and embellish a programming template that populated Discovery, History and National Geographic in the years to come."
