= Johnny Miller (aviator) =

American aviator, autogyro pioneer, and airline pilot

Johnny M Miller
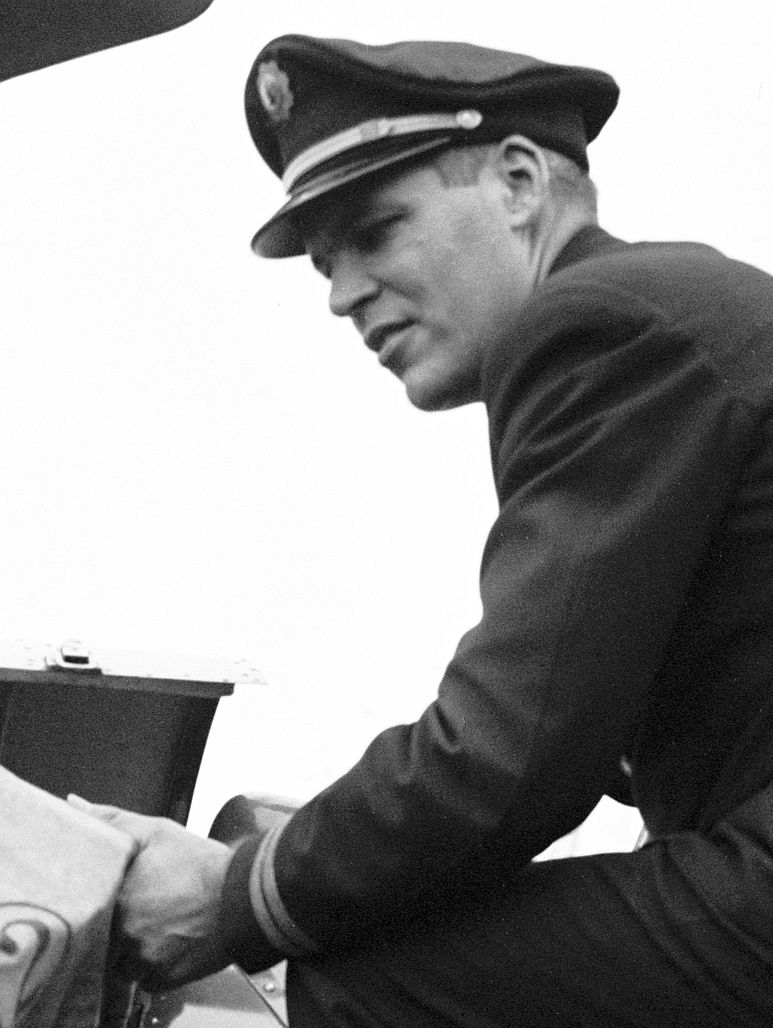
- Johnny Miller in 1939
- Born: John MacDonald Miller; 15 December 1905; Poughkeepsie, New York, U.S.
- Died: 23 June 2008 (aged 102); Vassar Brothers Medical Center, Poughkeepsie, New York, U.S.
- Resting place: Poughkeepsie Rural Cemetery
- Education: Pratt Institute of Technology
- Known for: Barnstorming; autogyro pioneer; test pilot; airline pilot; oldest active US pilot
- Spouses: Katherine North Sague; Edith Mead
- Relatives: Lee Miller (sister)
- Aviation career
- First flight: 1922; Curtiss JN-4 Jenny
- Famous flights: First US transcontinental autogyro flight First US rotorcraft scheduled mail service
- Air force: US Marine Corps
- Rank: Lieutenant

John MacDonald Miller (15 December 1905 − 23 June 2008) was a barnstorming pilot, the first person to make a US transcontinental flight in a rotorcraft, the first to land a rotorcraft on the roof of a building, and the first to fly a scheduled US mail rotorcraft service. He was also a test pilot and airline captain. He became the oldest active pilot in the US, making his first flight on his 18th birthday and ending at the age of 101. He died aged 102.

== Early life ==
John Miller was the first child of Theodore and Florence MacDonald Miller of Poughkeepsie, New York. He had a sister, photo-reporter Elizabeth "Lee" and brother, Erik. Theodore Miller was the manager of the De Laval Cream Separator Company, one of the largest businesses in the area, and Johnny attended a local preparatory school, Oakwood Friends School.

At the age of four Miller saw Glen Curtiss fly from a field opposite his father's farm as one of two permitted refuelling stops during his successful attempt to win the New York World newspaper prize of $10,000 for a flight from Albany to New York City, and decided to become a pilot. In 1915 Miller met and talked to famous aviator Ruth Law and sat in the cockpit of her Wright Model B aircraft. He studied Horatio Barber's flying instruction book Aerobatics given to him by an uncle.

Miller took his first flight in a Curtiss JN-4 Jenny in the summer of 1922 at Asbury Park, New Jersey.

== Barnstorming ==
In 1923 a barnstorming pilot, Sloan "Swanee" Taylor, gave pleasure flights in a decrepit Jenny from a field near his home, and the 17-year-old Miller, who was working in a machine shop during school holidays, helped him with maintenance and repairs. The aircraft was actually the Canadian version of the Jenny, a Canuck, but was modified with larger wings, giving slower take-offs and landings. It was previously owned by Ruth Law, and had a brand new engine. At the end of the season, Taylor gave Miller a 5-minute ride, then gave him the Jenny, saying that it would be cheaper to buy a new aircraft rather than repair this one. After doing a lot of repairs to it himself, Miller practised on the ground for a few weeks, and on his 18th birthday found himself rapidly approaching a stone wall, so rather than crashing into it, he applied more power and took off. After around an hour's flying, exploring the effect of the controls, he eventually managed a reasonable landing, whereupon a local farmer who had been watching him, asked him if he gave rides. Miller said yes, and took him up for a handful of change, and on landing two other passers-by asked for rides, which he also did, charging $5 a flight, the amount painted on the side of the aircraft. Miller did some more pleasure flights, then at Christmas he took it to a local barn and with the help of friends did extensive repairs. By the summer of 1924 he had finished, did more flights, mainly with the friends, and then sold it before starting college.

Miller made the trip to Roosevelt Field on 20 May 1927 to watch Charles Lindbergh take off on his pioneering transatlantic flight. A month later he graduated from a mechanical engineering course at Pratt Institute of Technology in 1927, gained his A&P (airframe and powerplant) licence (no. 2906) and then worked for a while as a mechanic with Gates Flying Circus. He gained his transport pilot's licence (no. 5945) in 1928 with the Curtiss School of Flight at Mineola, Long Island, New York, and did more barnstorming and pleasure flights with his four-passenger Standard J-1 which he had rebuilt over six months from a near-wreck. He started air racing in a Travel Air 2000.

In 1927 the mayor of Poughkeepsie, John Kelsey Sague (later to become Miller's father-in-law), established Poughkeepsie Airport at Red Oaks Mill to the south-east of the town, which in 1931 Miller took over and ran. He established his company, Giro Flyers Ltd in the hangar there. His main business was repair and maintenance of the aircraft, many of them New Standard models, used by bootleggers to bring alcohol in from Canada. Miller's interest in this lucrative business carried on until the end of prohibition in 1933, but the airport carried on until it was closed in 1938. (Note: It was here that a young Cole Palen first became interested in aviation, taking his first aircraft ride in 1935. He went on to found Old Rhinebeck Aerodrome, famous for its collection of antique aircraft and airshows. In later years Miller would be a regular visitor to Old Rhinebeck, but never flew any of their aircraft.) (Note: A larger airport capable of handling the airliners of the day had been established in 1932 just two miles to the south. This was New Hackensack Field, later called Dutchess County Airport, now known as Hudson Valley Regional Airport.)

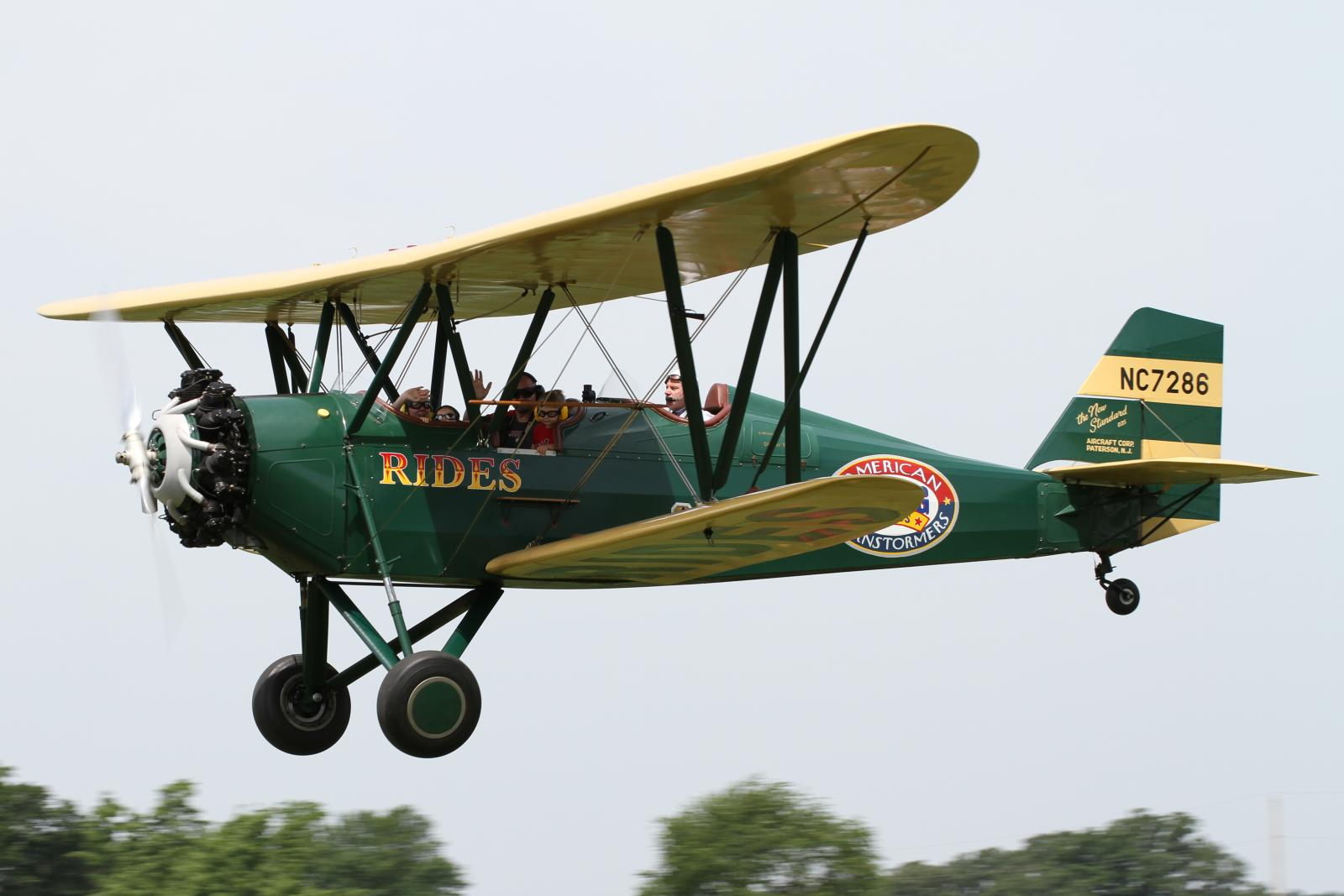
A New Standard D-25 with four passengers in the front cockpit

In 1931 he acquired New Standard D-24 c/n102 registered NC193E. Its fuselage had been damaged when Anthony Fokker wrecked a line of parked aircraft while landing his Express aircraft at Teterboro Airport,. It was powered by a 180 hp (134 kW) Hispano-Suiza E engine. Miller rebuilt it with a 220 hp (164 kW) Wright J-5 engine, turning it into a D-25. Assisted by efficient ground crew to marshal the passengers and refuel the aircraft, he would do up to 350 short flights (less than a minute each) a day. While doing aerobatics in the New Standard, Marine Corps officers saw him and invited him to join the Reserve at Pensacola, Florida, and he served for a while at Quantico, Virginia, as a qualified naval aviator. Miller sold the D-25 in 1935.

== Autogyros ==
=== Pitcairn ===
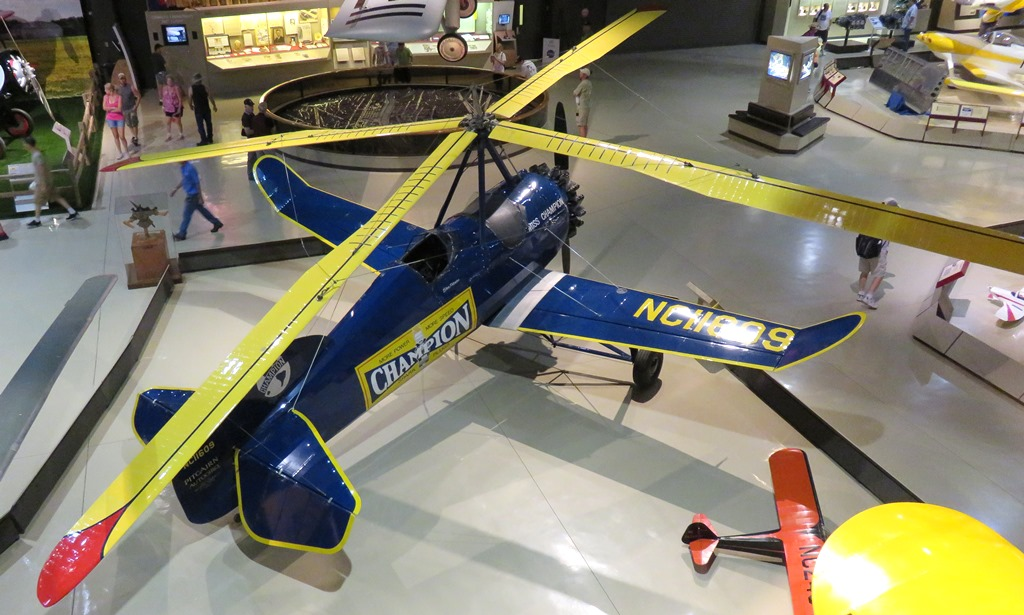
A Pitcairn PCA-2, 'Miss Champion', NC11609, at the EAA Museum, Oshkosh, Wisconsin

In 1923 Miller read about the progress that Juan de la Cierva was making with autogyros in Madrid. Miller wrote to him, and received two letters in return, explaining how autogyros work. In 1929 Cierva had visited the US and sold the licence for his designs to Harold Pitcairn, forming the Pitcairn-Cierva Autogiro Company. Miller's correspondence had continued, and he visited Pitcairn, soon ordering a PCA-2, becoming the first private individual in the US to purchase an autogyro, at a cost of $15,000 (equivalent to $317,600 in 2025).

He then formulated a plan to perform the first transcontinental autogyro flight, which he soon discovered would be in competition with Amelia Earhart, whose Pitcairn autogyro was sponsored by the Beech-Nut food company, then well known for its chewing gum. Miller realised that Pitcairn was keen for the famous Earhart to get her aircraft first to ensure maximum publicity, but Miller arranged to learn to fly a similar machine at Pitcairn's plant before his own aircraft was ready. This enabled him to do detailed training and planning before the long-distance flight, and to set off before Earhart was ready to undertake her flight, for which she was evidently under-prepared. He did practice flights at the Pitcairn plant at Willow Grove, Pennsylvania, between 9 and 12 May 1931, making 110 practice landings with a total of 5.5 hours of flying logged.

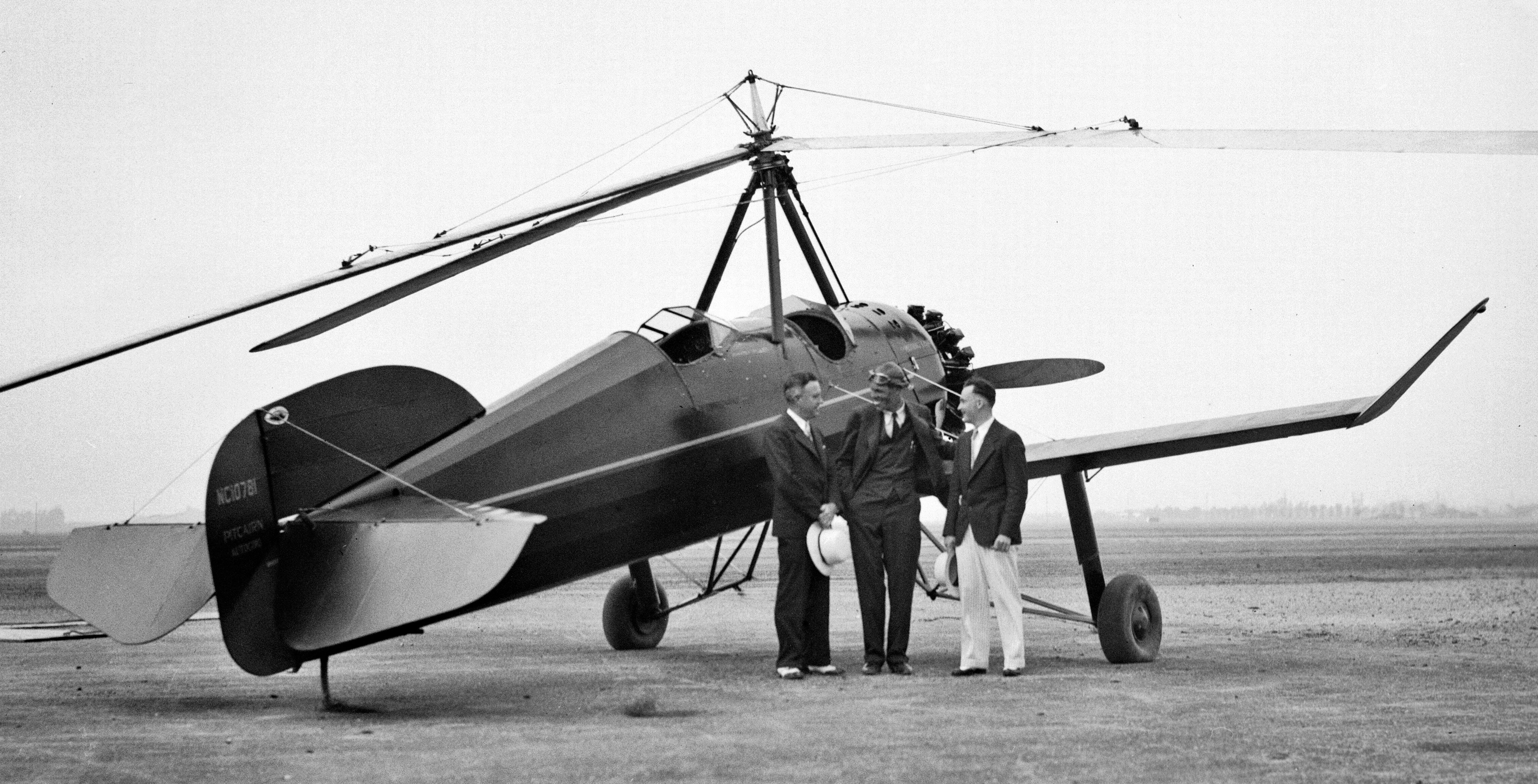
Miller (center) with Missing Link, 1931

Miller took delivery of his new machine, a black PCA-2 c/n B-13, (Note: Miller ordered his aircraft before Beech-Nut ordered theirs, but Earhart was superstitious, so the factory switched the data plates so that Earhart received B-12 and Miller got B-13.) registered NC10781, which he named Missing Link (Note: David S. Ingalls, the Navy's only WWI ace and Assistant Secretary of the Navy for Aeronautics published an article in Fortune Magazine entitled 'Autogiros – Missing Link' asserting that 'Inventor Juan de la Cierva and Impresario Pitcairn offer the most promising new flying machine in the thirty-year history of aviation.') on 12 May 1931. Two days later, on 14 May, he transferred it to his newly formed company, Giro Flyers, Ltd. On the same day he set off from Willow Grove (Note: Some accounts say that he started out from Poughkeepsie.) on his transcontinental flight. He stopped off at the Omaha Air Races, where he did 14 demonstration flights, finally reaching Naval Air Station San Diego, now Naval Air Station North Island, on 28 May. He had spent 43.8 hours in the air and had no mechanical problems with the aircraft. His flight set a record which lasted 72 years, when it was broken by Andrew Keech in his Herron-Keech Little Wing LW-5 on 3 October 2003.

While he was in San Diego, Miller demonstrated the PCA-2 to the military at the North Island, Coronado, base, including giving passenger flights to two admirals. These were the first ever autogyro flights on the west coast of the US. Fêted by oil companies and film star Mary Pickford, his departure was delayed until 21 June, when he started the return flight to Willow Grove, arriving on 1 July. When Pitcairn mechanics inspected the aircraft, all that was needed was an oil change.

Earhart flew her PCA-2. NC10780, setting out from Newark Metropolitan Airport on 28 May and after an unhurried journey with many publicity stops reached Oakland, California on 6 June. She and her sponsor were extremely disappointed to learn that Miller had beaten her, and resolved to try to beat his west-to-east performance. However, she crashed at Abilene, Texas during the attempt, finishing her journey by train but still garnering more publicity than Miller.

Miller carried on over the next four years demonstrating the autogyro at air races, and air shows, and developed the skill of looping it, becoming the first person to loop a rotorcraft (though not the first person to demonstrate it publicly). He incorporated the manoeuvre into his displays, often adding a roll at the top. He was being paid $1,000 per display. In the 1932 Cleveland National Air Races he was performing a mock dogfight against a modified Curtiss Pusher and on landing, his autogyro was hit by the Curtiss as it overflew him, probably the result of a strong wind on the fragile biplane. (Note: Some accounts say that the Curtiss was sucked into the downdraught from the autogyro, but unlike helicopters, autogyros do not produce a downdraught, so this explanation is unlikely.) Miller and his passenger were unharmed, but the Curtiss pilot, his friend Al Wilson, died two days later of his injuries. The autogyro was damaged and was grounded for 27 days waiting for new rotors and a rudder. There is film of the crash.

On 26 January 1934 he was banner-towing in the PCA-2. He took off from Newark for a flight around Manhattan. The engine stopped over North Arlington, New Jersey and he landed safely in a cemetery, fixed the engine and took off from among the gravestones.

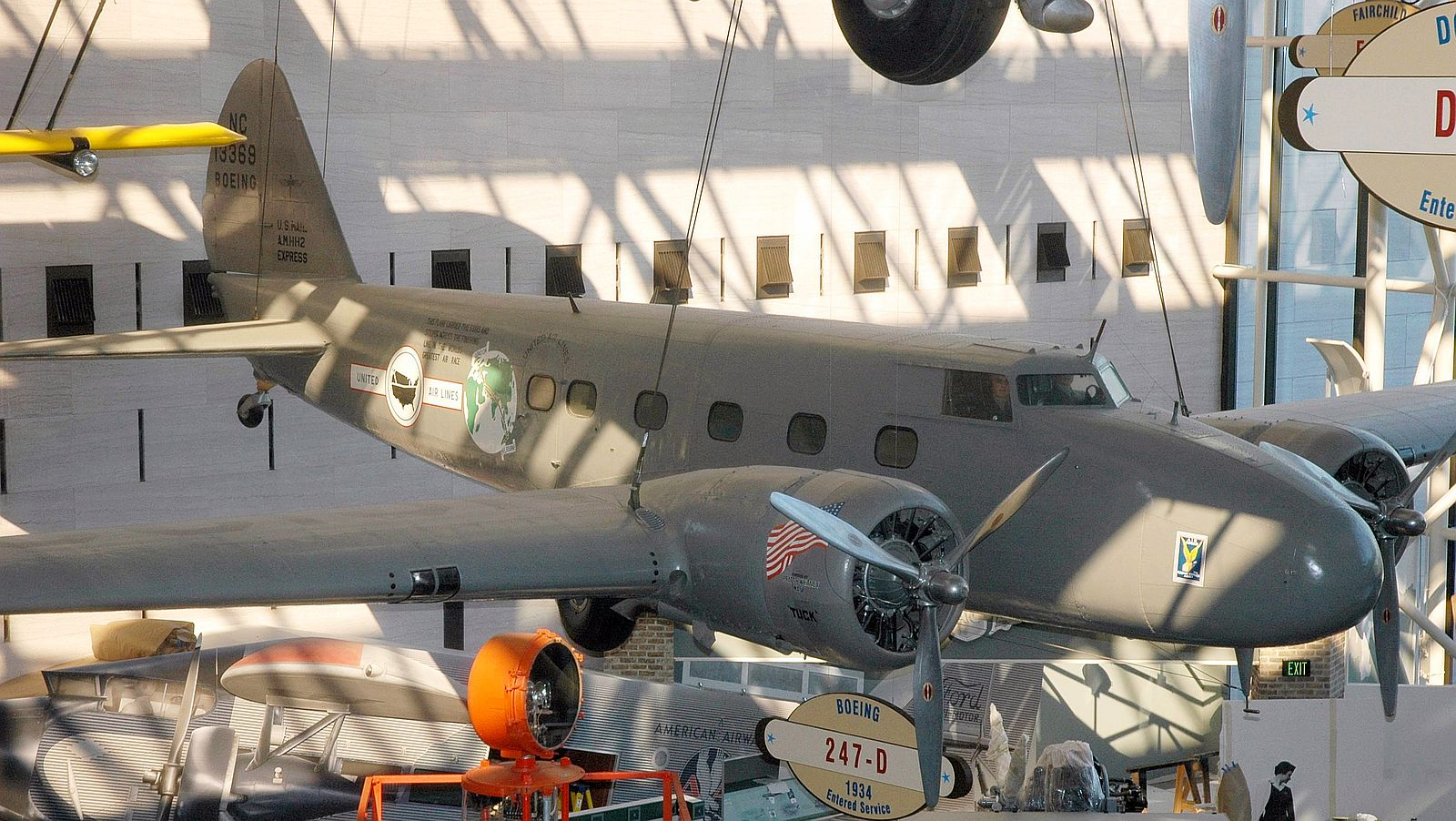
United Air Lines Boeing 247D NC13369 on display in the NASM

In 1936 he joined United Air Lines as a Boeing 247D co-pilot flying the Cheyenne to Salt Lake City and New York to Chicago routes. He flew with United for around 18 months, and was about to be promoted to captain when he was contacted by W. Wallace Kellett.

=== Kellett ===
Kellett had obtained a licence to produce Pitcairn autogyros, and asked Miller to be the test pilot for his new wingless version, the two-seat KD-1. The D in the name stood for Direct control, meaning that the rotor was responsible for all aerodynamic control, so that ailerons (and therefore the wings), elevators and indeed airspeed were no longer required. Other test pilots had declined to fly it, fearing for the safety of the aircraft, but Miller, thoroughly understanding the principles involved, was convinced that the radical new design would be safe, and accepted Kellett's offer. The testing went well, Miller even becoming the first pilot to dive an autogyro – the advancing rotors went near-supersonic and caused severe problems for Miller, but he survived, shaken but unscathed, and the aircraft sustained only minor damage, mainly to the rotor blades. The inspector who had asked for this test then declined to pass the aircraft but Miller told him that any aircraft subject to that level of abuse where it and the pilot both survived was obviously worthy of a certificate, and the inspector agreed.

This success emboldened Kellett and Miller to lobby Washington to enable regular autogyro mail services to start, and an act was passed on 15 April 1938. Remarkably, the act released rotary-winged aircraft from most of the safety provisions that applied to fixed-wing aircraft, mainly on account of their ability to land safely almost anywhere in the event of an emergency. This exemption largely continues into the 21st century.

Kellett then approached several airlines to bid on mail contracts for an autogyro service. At first only TWA was interested, but Miller thought that they just wanted the publicity. He made two demonstration flights for them between the Chicago postal facility and Chicago Municipal Airport (now Midway Airport), but TWA then rejected the idea.

Kellett and Miller then approached Eddie Rickenbacker of Eastern Air Lines with a view to using Kellett autogyros to fly the mail between the main post office in Philadelphia and the nearby Camden Central Airport in New Jersey, a distance of just under six miles, crossing the Delaware River and saving a considerable amount of time. Rickenbacker was very enthusiastic and agreed to run a one-year trial. He offered Miller the job as chief pilot of the operation. To Kellett's surprise, Miller asked for twice the amount that Kellett was paying him, and Rickenbacker agreed, even offering to take him on as a regular pilot if the mail service ended.

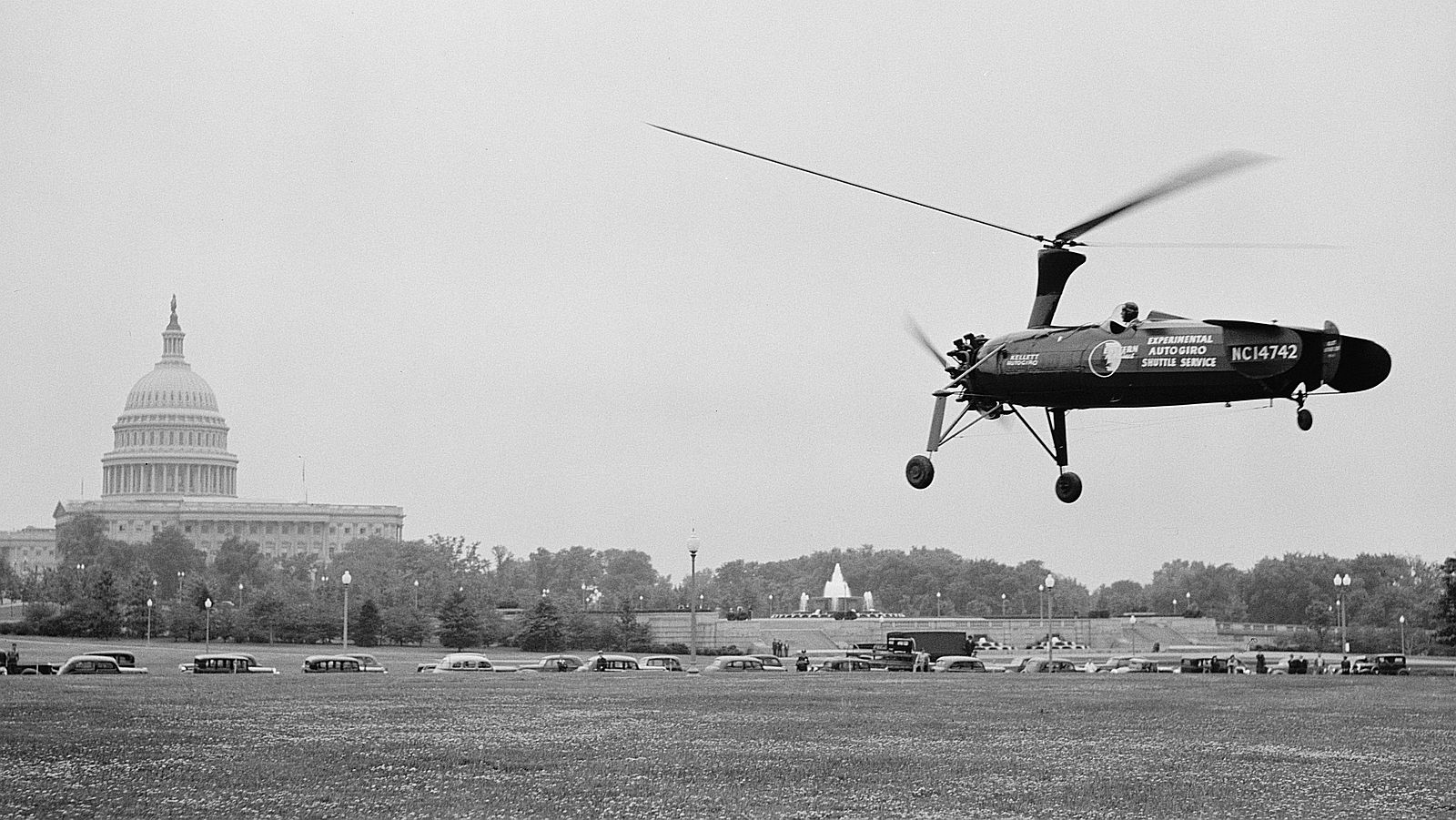
Johnny Miller flying into Washington in the KD-1A on 19 May 1938

On 19 May 1938, on behalf of Eastern Air Lines, Miller made a demonstration mail flight in the prototype KD-1, now modified into a KD-1A with a mail compartment in place of the front cockpit, from the Bethesda, Maryland, postal station to a temporary post office tent outside the main DC post office (now the National Postal Museum), as well as a trip from the DC post office to Washington Hoover airport. Kellett then designed a new version, the KD-1B, with a canopy enclosing the rear, pilot's seat, a radio, blind-flying instruments, a landing light and other changes to Eastern's requirements.

Eddie Rickenbacker hands a mailbag to KD-1B pilot Johnny Miller at the start of the airmail service

The Eastern Air Lines mail service, no AM2001, started on 6 June 1939. after Miller had done several practice flights, mainly to get used to the often severe turbulence experienced on the roof of the post office. The new KD-1B was used, with the KD-1A held as a backup. A reserve pilot was recruited after Miller had to take two weeks off with influenza. This was John "Skipp" Lukens, the Pitcairn test pilot who had checked Miller out before he took delivery of his PCA-2. The service, the world's first rotary-wing mail service, and the first to use the roof of a building, ran five return flights a day, six days a week, with Miller doing the majority of the flying. and was a complete success, exceeding regularity expectations. There was only one minor incident when the autogyro, piloted by Lukens, was blown over by a 55 mph (89 km/h) wind on the post office roof while taxiing. Some debris from damaged rotor blades fell into the street below, leading to false reports that the autogyro itself had crashed. Miller repaired the damage himself. There was also one precautionary landing in a vacant lot by Lukens due to suspected carburettor icing. After a short wait, he took off again without further problems. The contract was completed on 5 June 1940 but was not renewed, so Miller then joined Eastern as a fixed-wing pilot.

== Later career ==
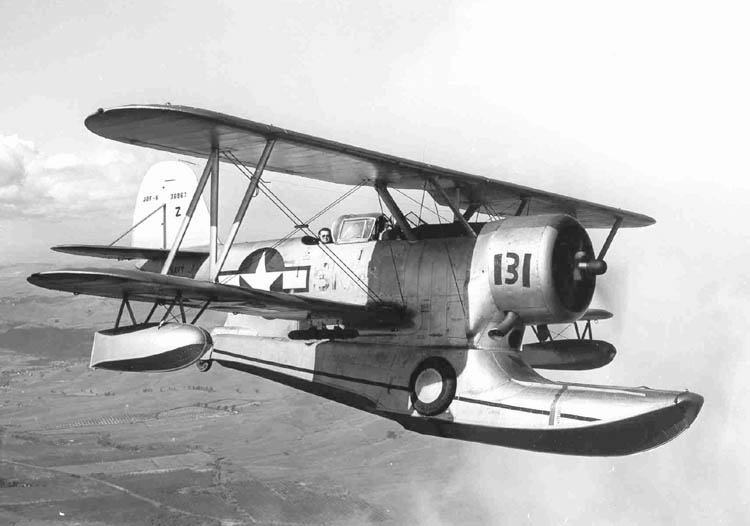
Grumman (Columbia) J2F-6 Duck of the type test flown by Miller

With Eastern Air Lines, he flew the Douglas DC-2 and DC-3. He also formed Miller's Machine Works, and on his days off, he manufactured small parts for the Columbia Aircraft Corporation, who had started producing Grumman J2F-6 Ducks at their Valley Stream plant on Long Island. In late 1941, as he was a reservist but too old for combat duty, he was invited to become their chief test pilot. In 1946 he also tested both prototypes of the unsuccessful Duck replacement, the monoplane Columbia XJL-1. Returning to Eastern, over the next 25 years he went on to fly the Douglas DC-4, DC-6, DC-7, Lockheed Constellation and Electra, and the DC-8.

For the latter part of his career he commuted daily in his Beech V35A Bonanza N19WC from Poughkeepsie to whichever New York airport he was scheduled to fly from – he claimed that he was the only airline pilot in the area to do that.

Miller left Eastern Air Lines in 1965 with over 35,000 hours in his logbooks. Miller has stated that he retired a little early (Eastern had compulsory retirement at age 60) because he was tired of returning late at night to a cold, dark, empty house. In reality he was either fired or asked to leave.

Miller then bought a three-passenger version of the Bell 47G helicopter which he flew on contract work, often for the police until 1971 when they bought their own helicopter. He tried to interest a local hospital in getting a heliport, but they didn't like the idea, and he then retired from commercial aviation.

In 1967 he was a founding director of the American Bonanza Society. He was also a member of the United Flying Octogenarians club (UFO), and a Charter member of the Quiet Birdmen.

In 2001, the 70th anniversary of his transcontinental autogyro flight, he made the trip again, now aged 94, in his Bonanza. A more leisurely affair, he stopped off at the EAA AirVenture show at Oshkosh, Wisconsin, and various other places. and reached his target, Gillespie Field outside San Diego. The return trip involved just two fuel stops, and the whole journey took 35.5 hours of flying.

He continued to fly his Bonanza and latterly a Turbo Baron from Poughkeepsie until he finally gave up his license in 2006. For a few years before this the FAA insisted that he flew with a safety pilot, but Miller gave them strict instructions to never touch the controls. He had been the US's oldest pilot.

He wrote a book called Flying Stories: A Chronicle of Aviation History from Jennys to Jets by the Pilot Who Flew Through It All, published in 2002. He used 'jennys2jets' as his email address. Miller took his first glider flight in 2006 aged 100 and liked it so much he went up for another.

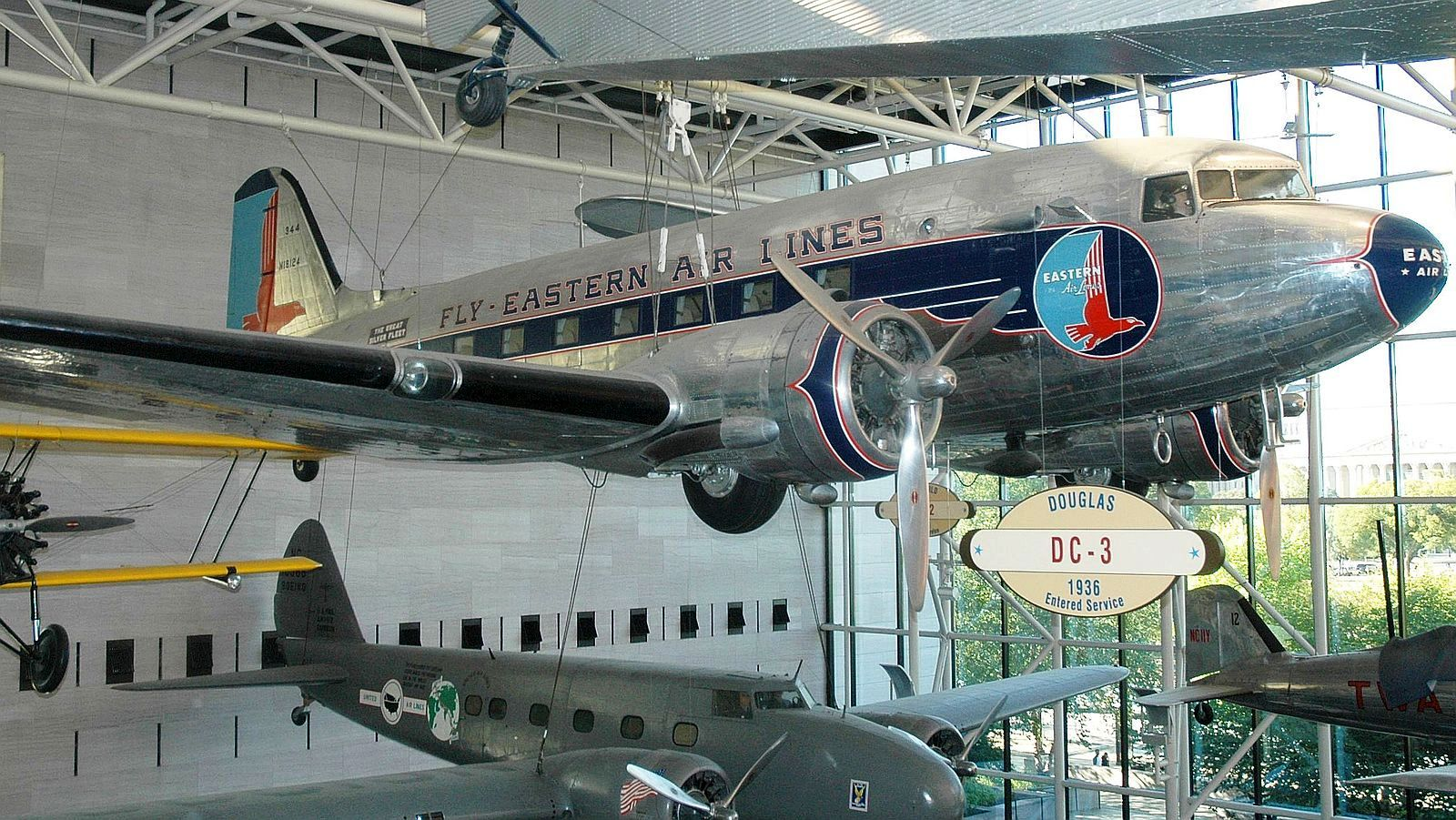
Eastern Air Lines Douglas DC-3 NC18124 in the NASM

Miller received the Sikorsky Award for his part in the evolution of the helicopter, a Certificate of Honour from the National Aeronautic Association for his contributions to aviation, and had been made an honorary fellow of the Society of Experimental Test Pilots for having “promoted the moral obligation of the test pilot to the safety of the aerospace world”.

Two aircraft flown by Miller are on display at the National Air and Space Museum (NASM) on Washington Mall: Boeing 247D NC13369 of United Air Lines and Douglas DC-3 NC18124 of Eastern Air Lines. The two flying prototypes of the Columbia XJL-1 that he tested are also in museums, one at Pima Air Museum, Arizona, and the other at the Yanks Air Museum, California.

== Personal life ==
Miller married Katherine North Sague on 18 June 1933. They had three children, Patricia, Joanne and John Sague Miller. Katherine died on 2 July 1963. Three years later he married Dr Edith Mead, who died on 18 April 1991.

In the 1960s he started cross-dressing, adopting the persona of Felicity Chandelle. (Note: Chandelle is the name of a standard flying technique for performing a climbing 180° turn.) He was arrested in New York City in March 1964, charged with vagrancy and being disguised in public. His sentence was two days imprisonment, suspended. Appeals were rejected by both the New York Court of Appeals and the US Supreme Court. Eastern Airlines subsequently fired Miller for having 'signalled homosexuality'.

Miller claimed never to have consumed alcohol, coffee or tobacco, and never took prescription drugs, except in his final days. He ate a lot of fruit and seafood, and never had butter on his bread, asking “Who the hell needs a lubricant to eat bread? Chew it.” He exercised through hill walking.

Johnny Miller died on 23 June 2008, aged 102, of natural causes at Vassar Brothers Medical Center, Poughkeepsie. His last words, to his nephew, were "I guess my flying days are over". He had requested that his body be donated to medical research through the Anatomy Gifts Registry.
