= New Standard =

New Standard may refer to:

== Aviation ==
- New Standard Aircraft Company, a company based in the United States that operated from 1927 to 1931
  - New Standard D-25, an agricultural and joy-riding aircraft
  - New Standard D-29, a trainer aircraft

== Media ==
- The New Standard (newspaper), a free-distribution semi-monthly Jewish newspaper in Columbus, Ohio
- The NewStandard, an online news service that was discontinued in 2007
- The New Standard, the name by which the London Evening Standard was known between 1980 and 1985
- The New Standard, the name by which The Standard (Philippines) was briefly known in 2015–16

== Music ==
- The New Standard (Herbie Hancock album), a 1996 album by Herbie Hancock
- New Standards (Kenny G album), a 2021 album by Kenny G
- New Standards (John Pizzarelli album), a 1994 album by John Pizzarelli
- The New Standard (Jamie Saft album), a 2014 album by Jamie Saft, Steve Swallow and Bobby Previte
- New Standards (Malachi Thompson album), a 1993 album by Malachi Thompson
- The New Standards, a minimalist jazz trio formed in Minneapolis, Minnesota, in 2005
- New standard tuning, a tuning for the guitar that approximates all-fifths tuning

== Other ==
- Project 100,000 soldiers of low ability recruited for the Vietnam War
