= D29 =

D29, D-29 or D.29 may refer to:

- HMAS Perth (D29), a light cruiser which served with the Royal Australian Navy during World War II
- Brazilian destroyer Paraná (1961), formerly USS Cushing (DD-797), a destroyer transferred to the Brazilian Navy in 1961 and given penant number D29
- Brazilian destroyer Paraná (1989), formerly USS Sample (FF-1048), a frigate transferred to the Brazilian Navy in 1989 and given penant number D29
- ARA Piedra Buena (D-29), formerly USS Collett (DD-730), a destroyer sold to the Argentinian Navy in 1974
- New Standard D-29, a commercial pilot trainer aircraft produced in the United States between 1929 and 1930
- D29 road (Croatia), a state road
- LNER Class D29, a class of British steam locomotives
