= Cole Palen =

American aviator (1925–1993)

- Born: December 28, 1925; Pennsylvania
- Died: December 8, 1993 (aged 67); Florida
- Occupations: pilot, aircraft preservationist, founder of the Old Rhinebeck Aerodrome aviation museum in upstate New York
- Website: ColePalen.com at the Wayback Machine (archived July 21, 2011), Old Rhinebeck Aerodrome: Meet Cole Palen at the Wayback Machine (archived June 24, 2016)

Cole Palen (December 28, 1925 – December 8, 1993) was the founder of the Old Rhinebeck Aerodrome, a living museum of vintage aircraft from 1900-1937 located in Red Hook, New York. He became recognized for his work in the preservation of early aviation history. Palen's aerodrome boasts one of the finest collections of antique aircraft in the world including an original 1909 Bleriot XI (civil registration N60094), the oldest flying aircraft in the United States and the second oldest in the world. He also created many accurate flying replicas of historical aircraft. Many of these participate in the regular airshows which continue to take place at the Aerodrome.

== Early life ==
James Henry Cole Palen Jr., generally known as Cole Palen, was born in Pittsburgh, Pennsylvania but his parents soon moved to a chicken farm in upstate New York outside the town of Poughkeepsie. As a child, he developed an early fascination with aviation and delighted in building free-flight model airplanes. His schoolhouse was across the road from Poughkeepsie's Red Oaks Mill Airport. At the age of five, Palen discovered an aircraft starting crank in his parents' yard, and he returned it to its owner, Johnny Miller, the famous barnstorming pilot who managed the airport. The crank had fallen from Miller's plane during aerobatics practice. When he was 10, Gates Flying Circus visited the airport, and Palen took his first flight, a 50 cent ride in a New Standard D-25.

After graduating from high school in August 1944, Palen was drafted into the United States Army just in time take part in the Battle of the Bulge. On returning to the United States in 1946, he enrolled in the Roosevelt Aviation School at Roosevelt Field, Long Island, to train as a mechanic. After gaining his A&E licence in 1947 he learned to fly and bought a Piper Cub which he soon crashed after 70 flying hours. He discovered that one of the hangars at Roosevelt Field contained a small collection of dirty and disassembled World War I aircraft.

In 1951, Roosevelt Field closed and plans were laid for a shopping center to be built on the site, so the World War I aircraft were put up for sale. The Smithsonian had already acquired three of the aircraft so Cole quickly bid his life savings of, according to his friends, around $1,500 (equivalent to $18,600 in 2025) for the remainder. He became the owner of an Aeromarine 39B, Avro 504K, Curtiss Jenny, Sopwith Snipe, SPAD XIII and a Standard J-l. He was given just thirty days to remove the aircraft from Roosevelt Field, which required nine 200-mile round trips to the family home where they were stored in a barn which he rented from his father.

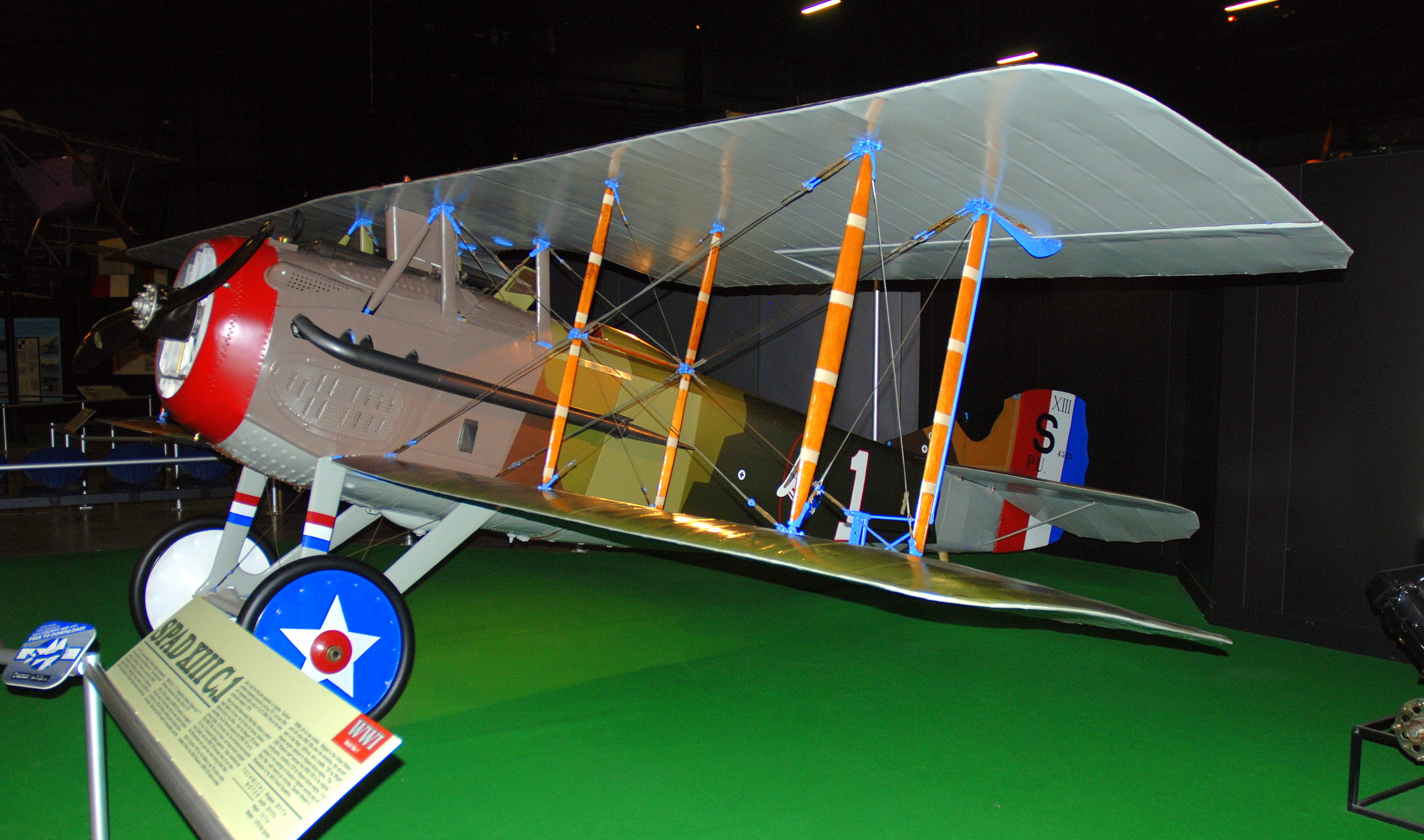
Palen's restored SPAD XIII, now at the USAF Museum

Palen and a group of friends then started to restore the aircraft, starting with the SPAD and its engine, and he continued to add other aircraft to this collection, including a Bleriot XI. He flew the aircraft at nearby Stormville Airport from where he once had to make a forced landing in the neighbouring prison's vegetable garden. In 1956 Palen met Frank Tallman, who would later co-found Tallmantz Aviation. Tallman told Palen that an opportunity had arisen to rent the SPAD and the Bleriot for use in a movie, Lafayette Escadrille, starring Tab Hunter, being shot in California. Palen seized the chance, and the money he made from the venture was to come in very useful.

== Old Rhinebeck Aerodrome ==
In 1959, Palen found a farm for sale near Rhinebeck, New York. This property included a small farmhouse in which an unsolved murder had taken place. Between his savings from his employment at Texaco (Note: Texaco Research Center's 'huge complex' was sited in Glenham, about 12 miles south of Poughkeepsie, from 1931 through 2003.) as a lab technician and earnings from the film deal, he was able to purchase the property by paying the back taxes owed on it. With the help of local youngsters and a bulldozer, he felled trees, cleared rocks and levelled, or at least smoothed, the land to create a 1,000 feet (300 m) long by 100 feet (30 m) wide runway in the forest, (Note: The runway is however far from flat, with the southern end dropping 16 feet (4.9 m) in the first 500 feet (150 m) thereafter rising gently for most of the remainder (ref Google Earth elevation profile).) and built replica period hangars from scrap materials. Palen collected aircraft spanning the period of the birth of aviation up to the start of World War II. He restored them and flew them regularly, and where surviving examples of early original aircraft did not exist, he built accurate reproductions powered by authentic, vintage-era engines. He also gathered a sizeable collection of veteran and vintage vehicles, mostly in working order.

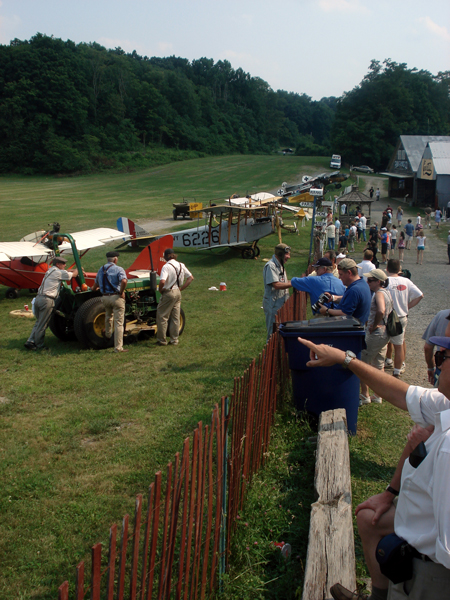
Airshow flightline showing the slope at the south end of the runway

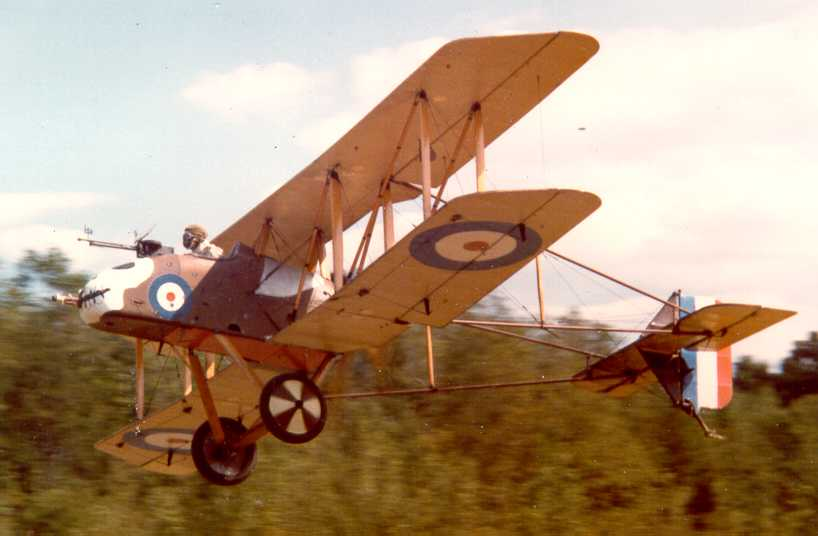
Royal Aircraft Factory F.E.8 replica built by Cole Palen flying at Old Rhinebeck

Palen had a strict philosophy regarding his aircraft; he believed that a plane was not truly a plane unless it could fly. By putting this philosophy into action, Palen made the Old Rhinebeck Aerodrome one of the few places in the world where the public could see aircraft from the dawn of aviation actually fly. Taking this a step further, Palen made both his original and reproduction aircraft as authentic as possible. Original drawings would be used for restoration and creation of accurate reproduction airframes, as well as the installation of original parts and engines into the machines so they would look, sound, and fly the same way they did for the pioneers of early aviation. Where original aircraft existed elsewhere, Palen would visit them, taking copious notes and photographs, and employing a special fuselage measuring clamp and rubbing paper for maximum accuracy. To this end he visited places including the Musee de l'Air in Paris and the Shuttleworth Collection in the U.K.

At first Palen lived alone in the Old Rhinebeck Aerodrome farmhouse, and would construct and repair some of his aircraft there. He made a little money hiring aircraft for advertisements. He also made appearances at airshows anywhere in the eastern US, flying to the closer ones, but trucking the aircraft to more distant shows, travelling as far as Florida where he did 11 shows in 1965.

During normal days at the airfield volunteers and friends working on the aircraft or grounds would often be outnumbered by spectators, so Palen put a "hat at the gate" where spectators would drop nickels and dimes. For the comfort of the visitors, Palen sold cold drinks to them at cost price: "We weren't trying to make a profit, we were just being hospitable", Palen said. Gradually word spread and in 1960 shows were developed. The first show attracted just 25 people, but they soon developed into regular events, held on the last Sunday of every month, They became scripted, with pilots and other volunteers in period costumes playing WW1 comedy characters, with Palen himself acting as "famous fighter pilot" Eloc Nelap (Cole Palen spelled backwards). He would also adopt the character of The Black Baron when flying the Fokker F.1 Triplane.

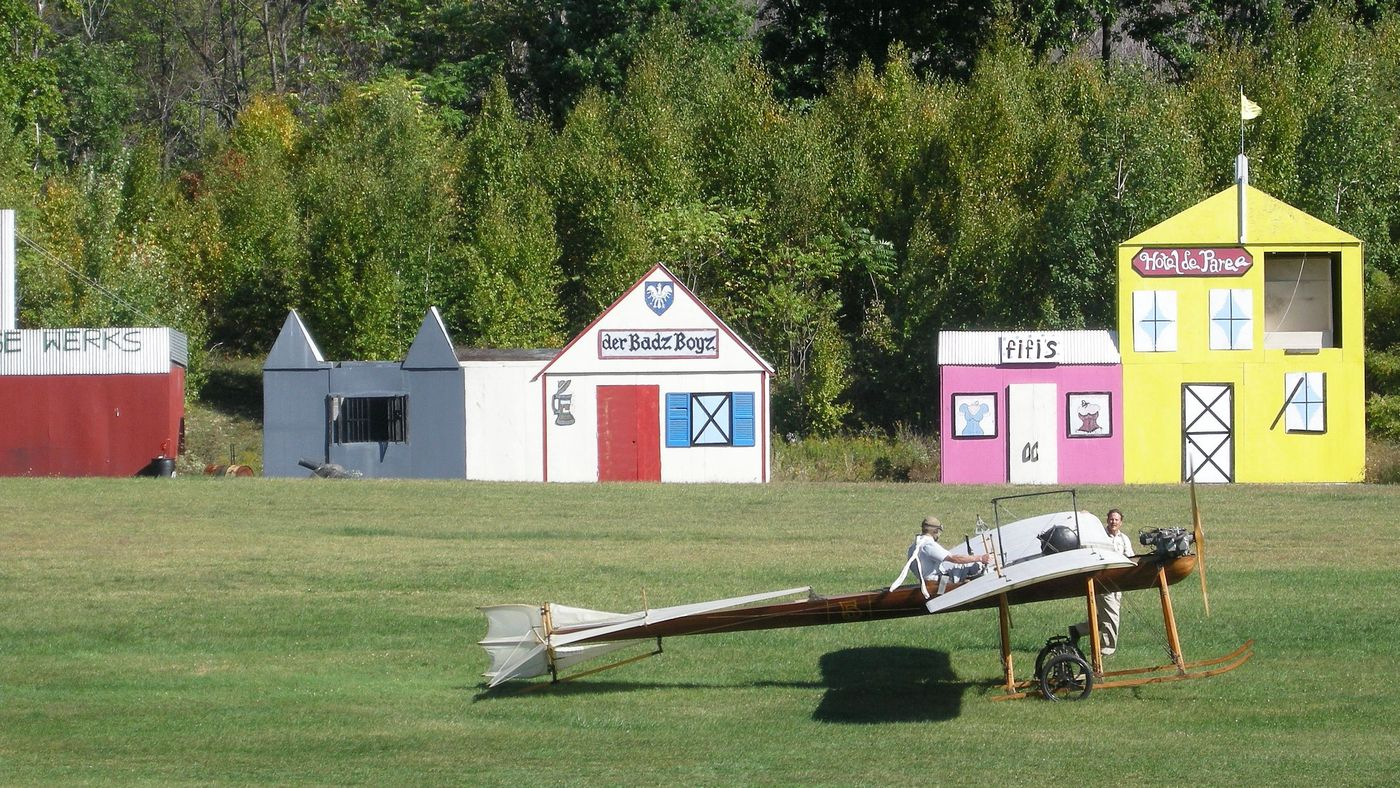
Palen and friends built this replica of a 1910 Hanriot, shown in front of 'the village'

As demand grew the schedule was changed to the present format of a show every Saturday and Sunday from mid-June through mid-October. The income allowed further buildings to be erected, including hangars across the road from the airfield to house a museum of many of his vehicles, engines and non-flying aircraft, plus "the Village", a row of fanciful WW1 European building facades to act as a backdrop for the flights and dogfights of the period aircraft.

Palen was involved with the 1965 British film Those Magnificent Men in Their Flying Machines, restoring and re-covering the Bleriot, and embarking on a 13-week road tour around the US promoting the film with flying displays. In return, Palen was given the replica Passat Ornithopter that had been built for the film. He was disappointed that he wasn't given a flying aircraft, but it remains as part of the museum collection.

In April 1965, Cole Palen flew his 1912 Thomas Pusher 100 miles (160 km) from Rhinebeck to New York City and after a three-day trip, appeared on the television game show I've Got a Secret. Palen was associated with several more movies, most notably in 1983, when he worked as a stunt double for Woody Allen in the film Zelig.

On 17 March 1967, Palen married Rita Weidner. Rita took over management of the Old Rhinebeck Aerodrome and brought some order to the administrative side of things, allowing him to add staff and buildings, grow the collection, and make plans for the future.

Palen was able to build up a respectable collection of model aircraft. He ran workshops for local kids, and would fly their models on the airfield. Occasional model contests were held, such as the 1968 Poughkeepsie IBM (Note: IBM has a very large presence in Poughkeepsie.) Radio Control Club meet, and continue to be held at the airfield, including the Cole and Rita Palen Annual Memorial Free-Flight Model Meet, which started in 2005.

Also in 1983, while Palen and his wife were in their second home in Palm Beach, Florida, the farmhouse burned down. It had been crammed full of aeronautical records, log books, parts, instruments and other treasures which were all lost, but Palen was philosophical about this, saying "what's gone is gone". The farmhouse was rebuilt on the site and survives near the airport's main entrance.

Palen had a workshop at the Florida home, and started to construct a replica of the Ryan NYP, Spirit of St. Louis, Charles Lindbergh's transatlantic aircraft. Having tack-welded the fuselage frame he returned to Old Rhinebeck, but on his next trip to Florida, discovered that a well-meaning friend had hired a welder to complete the job, completely ruining it. Palen had to scrap the project. However, on hearing of this, his staff and friends at Old Rhinebeck decided to restart the project. The resulting aircraft took 20 years to complete, partly because they went to enormous lengths to make it as accurate as possible. The Smithsonian, with whom Palen had a close relationship, provided identical cockpit instruments from their stores. It eventually flew on 5 December 2015, and still regularly flies at Old Rhinebeck.

== Death ==
Early in 1993, Palen suffered a stroke. Looking to the future, he decided to form the Rhinebeck Aerodrome Museum Foundation. The Foundation came into being during the course of the year under a board of directors to ensure the survival of the collection. Following the end of the 1993 season, Cole and Rita made their annual pilgrimage to Florida. Early that December, Rita suffered a slight stroke and was admitted to the hospital. It was at this time that Cole died of a heart attack in his sleep. Rita made an excellent recovery and continued with her husband's legacy until her death on August 12, 2002 at Rhinebeck.

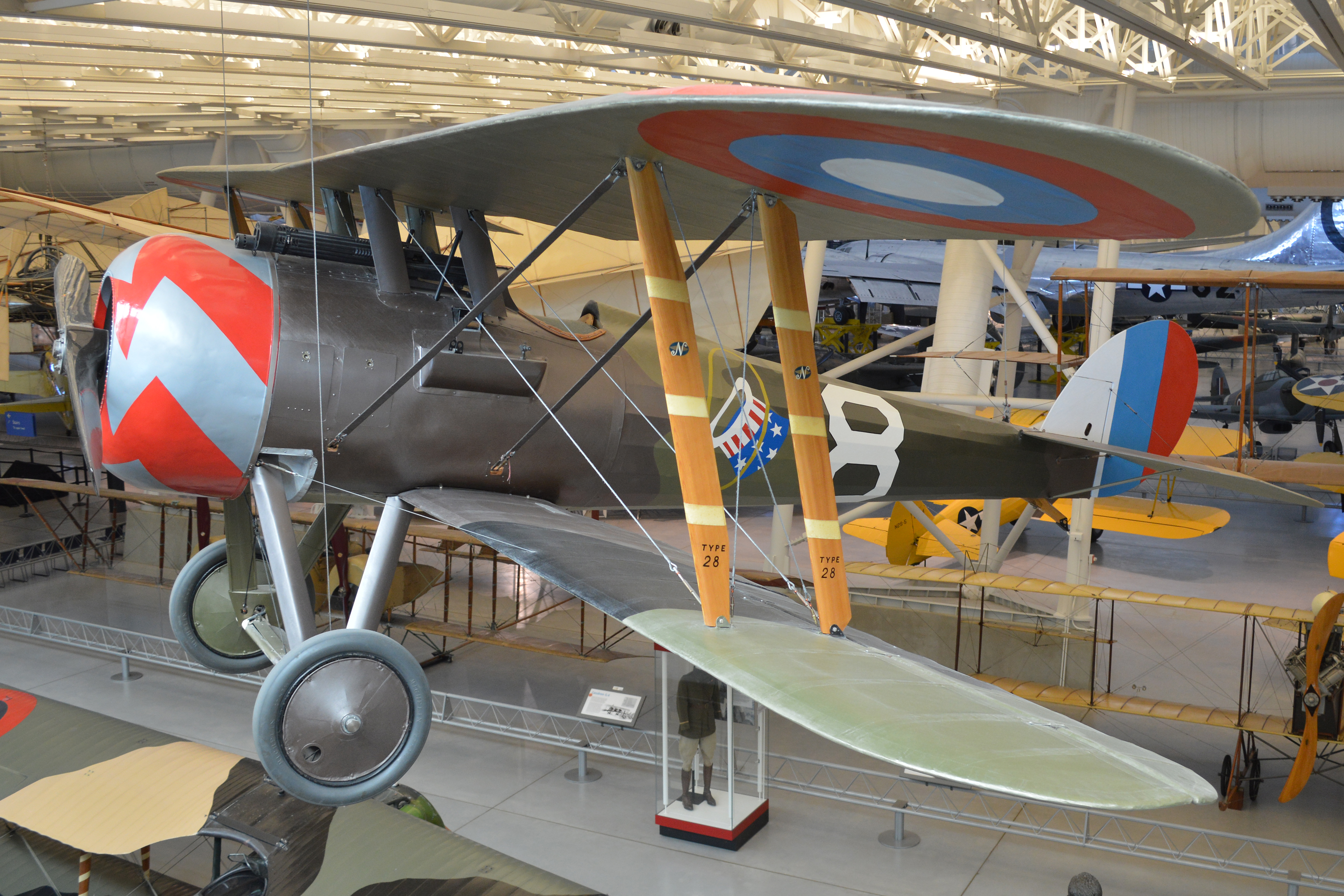
Palen restored and flew this Nieuport 28C.1 from 1958 to 1972. It went to the NASM 's Udvar-Hazy Center in 1984

In 1995, the Experimental Aircraft Association recognized Palen for his work by posthumously inducting him to the EAA's Vintage Aircraft Association Hall of Fame.

Several of the original World War I aircraft that Cole acquired and restored to airworthy condition are now on display in museums such as the United States Air Force Museum, Canada Aviation Museum, and the National Air and Space Museum (NASM).

A "delightful" biography of Cole Palen and the aerodrome was written by Palen's long-term friend and collaborator E. Gordon Bainbridge.

== Bibliography ==
- Bainbridge, E. Gordon (1977). The Old Rhinebeck Aerodrome: The story of Cole Palen and his 'living' aviation museum. Florida: Exposition Press. ISBN 0-682-48883-6.
- Vines, Mike (1998a). Return to Rhinebeck. Shrewsbury, England: Airlife Publishing. ISBN 1-85310-975-4.
