= Ivan R. Gates =

American aviator (1890–1932)

- Born: Ivan Rhuele Gates; January 15, 1890; Rockford, Michigan, U.S.
- Died: November 24, 1932 (aged 42); Manhattan, New York, U.S.
- Occupations: Barnstormer, entrepreneur
- Spouses: Azalene E. Demming; Clemence Bordenave Thompson; Hazel (maiden name ?)

Ivan Rhuele "Van" Gates (January 15, 1890 – November 24, 1932) was an American aviator and entrepreneur. While a member of the San Francisco Police Department, he is credited with being the first to transport a prisoner by air. He founded or co-founded the barnstorming Gates Flying Circus, which attained much success and fame in the 1920s. Later, he and designer Charles Healy Day established the Gates-Day Aircraft Company, subsequently renamed the New Standard Aircraft Company, to design and manufacture airplanes.

== Early life ==
Gates was born in Rockford, Michigan, to English-Scottish parents. His mother died when he was two. The family later moved to Detroit, where he attended high school for three years. At 18, he set out for California.

In 1910, he was a car salesman and car racer in San Francisco. That year, French aviator Louis Paulhan was on a tour of the United States, participating in airshows and competitions. The weather was bad on January 24, but Paulhan flew a Farman biplane for 12 minutes over Tanforan Racetrack after conditions marginally improved, showing Gates there was money to be made in aviation.

== Barnstormer, entrepreneur and policeman ==
He purchased a biplane from the Kansas City doctor who had built it, paying $2000. His Swiss aviator partner took one look at the flimsy airplane and left. Later, Gates took it for a ride and managed to rise to 20 feet (6.1 m) on his maiden flight. He obtained his pilot's license in 1911, qualifying him for membership in the Early Birds of Aviation.

Gates entered the 1915 American Grand Prize, driving a Renault, but was forced to withdraw before the start because the car was considered dangerous.

In late June 1917, he promoted and managed "Oakland's first Used Car Show", and Ivan R. Gates & Co. regularly advertised its used cars "truthfully represented" in the San Francisco Examiner.

On November 1, 1919, San Francisco Police officer Ivan R. Gates flew James Kelly, detained for carrying concealed weapons, from Alameda to San Francisco, delivering him to Chief of Police D. A. White. Kelly was afraid of flying, but was persuaded to go along by the assurance he would be given the minimum sentence of six months and parole in four. The feat made the news across the United States and Canada. Newspapers such as the Boston Globe stated it was the first time a prisoner had been transported by air.

Gates became a showman, founding or co-founding with Clyde Pangborn the Gates Flying Circus in 1921. It was the most spectacular of the barnstorming outfits in the 1920s, attracting in its heyday tens of thousands to a single show. A Time magazine article estimated it staged 2000 air meets in 44 states. It also toured Canada and Mexico. Among his pilots were "Upside-Down" Pangborn, Didier Masson and William S. Brock. Pangborn was the outfit's half-owner, chief pilot and operating manager. Gates had been Masson's manager in the 1910s. Gates himself did not fly much, accumulating only 600 hours overall. His car racing experience proved useful; for the stunts involving switching between an airplane and a car, he was the driver.

George Bruce was an advance man for the flying circus from 1924–27. Afterwards, he became a popular pulp writer. He encapsulated his Gates experience in two pieces of fiction. "Flying Circus" (Air Stories, December 1927), a short story, drew upon two actual GFC mishaps. Flying Circus, a 6-part serial in Argosy (Nov. 30, 1935–Jan. 4, 1936), fictionalized the entire history of the Gates Flying Circus, starting in 1919.

Accord to the Chicago Tribune, Gates felt the days of barnstorming were coming to an end, with aviation becoming more commonplace and the government adding ever more safety regulations, so on October 17, 1927, he teamed up with Charles Healy Day, designer of the Standard J airplane, to form the Gates-Day Aircraft Company to design and build aircraft and to operate the Gates Flying Circus. He eventually sold his interest in the company and formed the Gates Aircraft Corporation and the Gates Flying Service, the latter based at Holmes Airport in New York. The onset of the Great Depression drove the Gates-Day Aircraft Company, by then renamed the New Standard Aircraft Company, into bankruptcy in 1931, and Gates' new businesses also foundered.

== Personal life ==
In 1912, Gates married wealthy widow Azalene E. Deming. They divorced, with the final decree being obtained on November 17, 1916.

The following day, Gates married Clemence Bordenave Thompson, the young widow of millionaire stockbroker Frank H. Thompson and an aspiring opera singer. They separated in February 1919, and she sued for divorce in June 1921.

At the time of his death, he was married to Hazel, herself a pilot.

== Death ==
With his money and health gone, on November 24, 1932, the despondent 42-year-old committed suicide by jumping from his Manhattan apartment, despite the frantic attempts of his diminutive wife to stop him.

== Legacy ==
In 1976, he was inducted into the New Jersey Aviation Hall of Fame.

A collection of scrapbooks, photographs and documents is held by Wright State University. The Museum of Flight has a Gates Flying Circus collection.

== Bibliography ==
- Rhode, Bill (1970). Baling Wire, Chewing Gum, and Guts: The Story of the Gates Flying Circus. Kennikat Press. ISBN 9780804614245.
- Cleveland, Carl M. (1978). "Upside-Down" Pangborn: King of the Barnstormers. Aviation Book Company. ISBN 9780911721041.
