= New Standard D-29 =

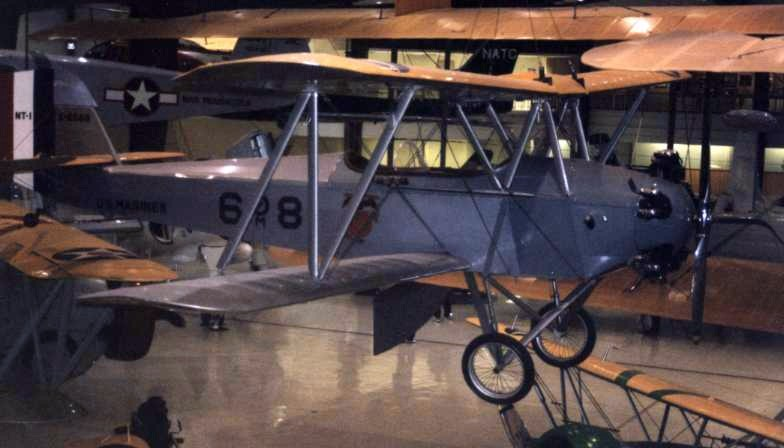
- A US Marine Corps NT-1 at the National Museum of Naval Aviation, at Pensacola, Florida (USA)

General information
- Type: Trainer
- National origin: United States
- Manufacturer: New Standard Aircraft Company
- Designer: Charles Healy Day
- Number built: 30+

History
- First flight: 1929

The New Standard D-29 is a trainer aircraft produced in the US from 1929 to 1930. It was a conventional biplane design with a fuselage constructed from duralumin members riveted and bolted together, and the wings were made with spruce spars and bass-wood and plywood built-up ribs. Deliberately built to be rugged and simple the D-29 was moderately successful, but had to compete with the Swallow TP.

== Variants ==
Data from: Aerofiles

D-29
initial version 85 hp Cirrus III engine, one built.
D-29A
production aircraft with 100 hp (75 kW) Kinner K-5. Six supplied to US Navy as the NT-1 trainer in 1930.(Note: The US Navy designation NT-2 does not refer to a version of the D-29, but to two New Standard D-25s captured from smugglers and used by the US Coast Guard).
D-29 Special
D-29A with Menasco B-4.
D-29S
Sport version with coupe cockpit (also known as D-25C).
D-31 Special
D-29A with Kinner B-5.
D-32 Special
three-seater D-29A with Wright J-6.
D-33 Special
three-seater D-29A with Kinner B-5.
NT-1
Six D-29A trainers supplied to the US Navy.

== Operators ==
United States

- United States Navy

== Specifications (D-29) ==
Data from U.S. Civil Aircraft Vol.2

General characteristics

- Crew: 2
- Length: 24 ft 11 in (7.59 m)
- Wingspan: 30 ft 0 in (9.14 m)
- Height: 9 ft 0 in (2.74 m)
- Wing area: 248 sq ft (23.0 m^{2})
- Empty weight: 1,097 lb (498 kg)
- Gross weight: 1,632 lb (740 kg)
- Powerplant: 1 × Cirrus III 4-cylinder air-cooled inline engine, 100 hp (75 kW)
- Propellers: 2-bladed fixed-pitch propeller

Performance

- Maximum speed: 88 mph (142 km/h, 76 kn)
- Cruise speed: 75 mph (121 km/h, 65 kn)
- Range: 300 mi (480 km, 260 nmi)
- Service ceiling: 10,000 ft (3,000 m)
- Rate of climb: 400 ft/min (2.0 m/s)

== See also ==
Aircraft of comparable role, configuration, and era

- Swallow TP
