= William S. Brock =

American aviation pioneer (1895–1932)

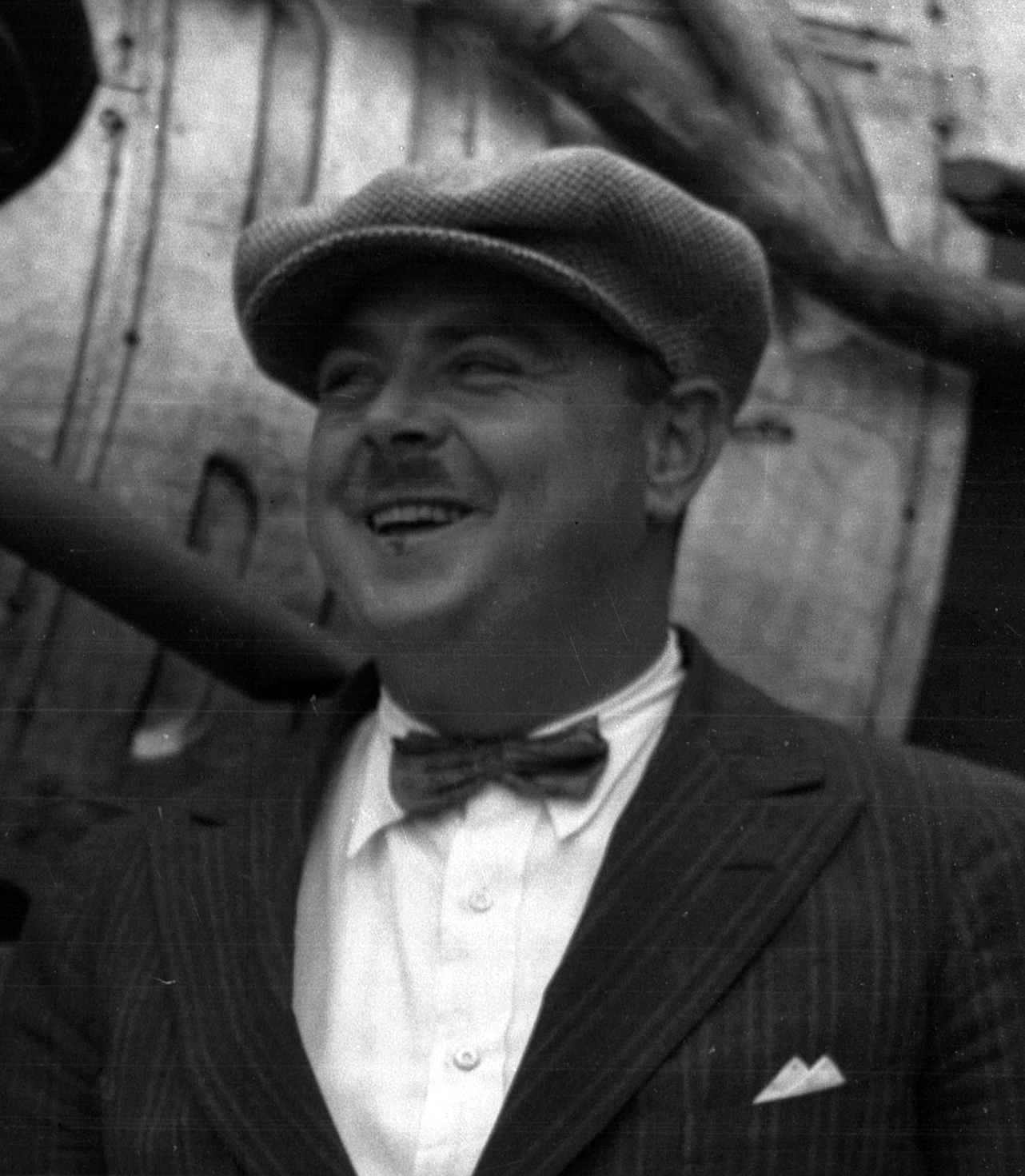
- Brock in 1928
- Born: 1895
- Died: November 13, 1932 (aged 36–37); Chicago, Illinois, U.S.
- Spouse: Violet Harrison (m. 1915)

William S. Brock Sr. (1895 – November 13, 1932) was an aviation pioneer. With Edward F. Schlee he made the eighth non-stop crossing of the Atlantic Ocean.

== Biography ==
He was born in 1895. He married Violet Harrison January 23, 1915, in Rochester, New York, and had as their son, William S. Brock Jr. In 1927, he and Edward F. Schlee planned to fly around the world in their airplane "Pride of Detroit". He died on November 13, 1932, at Presbyterian Hospital in Chicago, Illinois, of cancer.

== Legacy ==
The airplane "Pride of Detroit" is in the Henry Ford Museum in Dearborn, Michigan.
