= Old Rhinebeck Aerodrome =

Coordinates: 41.969816°N 73.864346°W

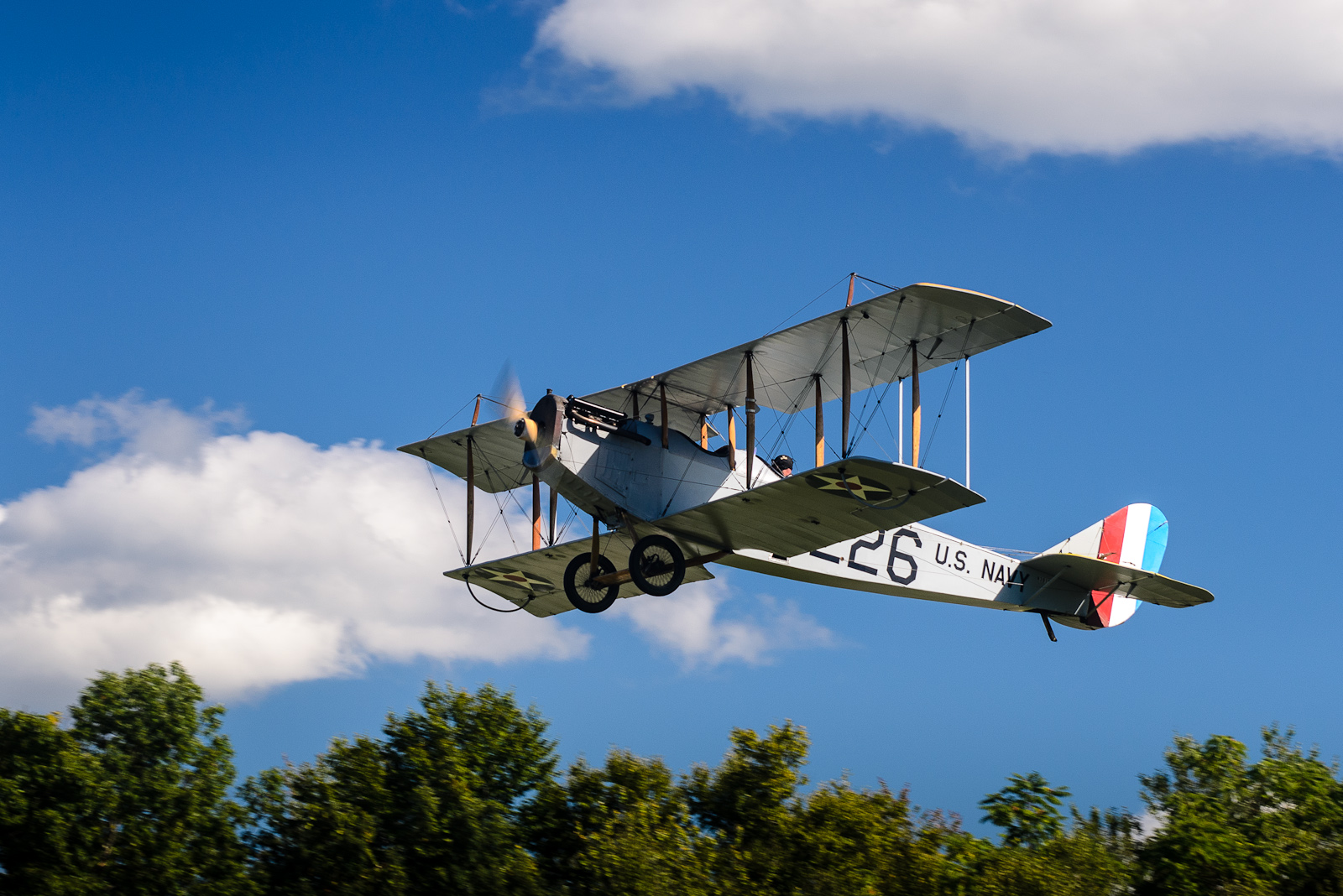
- Curtiss JN-4H Navy trainer in 2012

- Location within New York
- Established: 1958 • First air show in 1960
- Location: 9 Norton Rd. Red Hook, NY 12571
- Type: Living aviation museum
- Collections: Pioneer Era aircraft WW I aircraft Golden Age (1919-39) aircraft
- Founder: Cole Palen
- Public transit access: Rhinecliff-Kingston (Amtrak station)
- Website: www.oldrhinebeck.org

The Old Rhinebeck Aerodrome is a living museum in Red Hook, New York, located on the Rhinebeck town border. Founded in 1958, it owns many examples of airworthy aircraft from the pioneer era of aviation, World War I, and the Golden Age of Aviation between the world wars. It also holds a collection of roadworthy antique automobiles.

== History ==
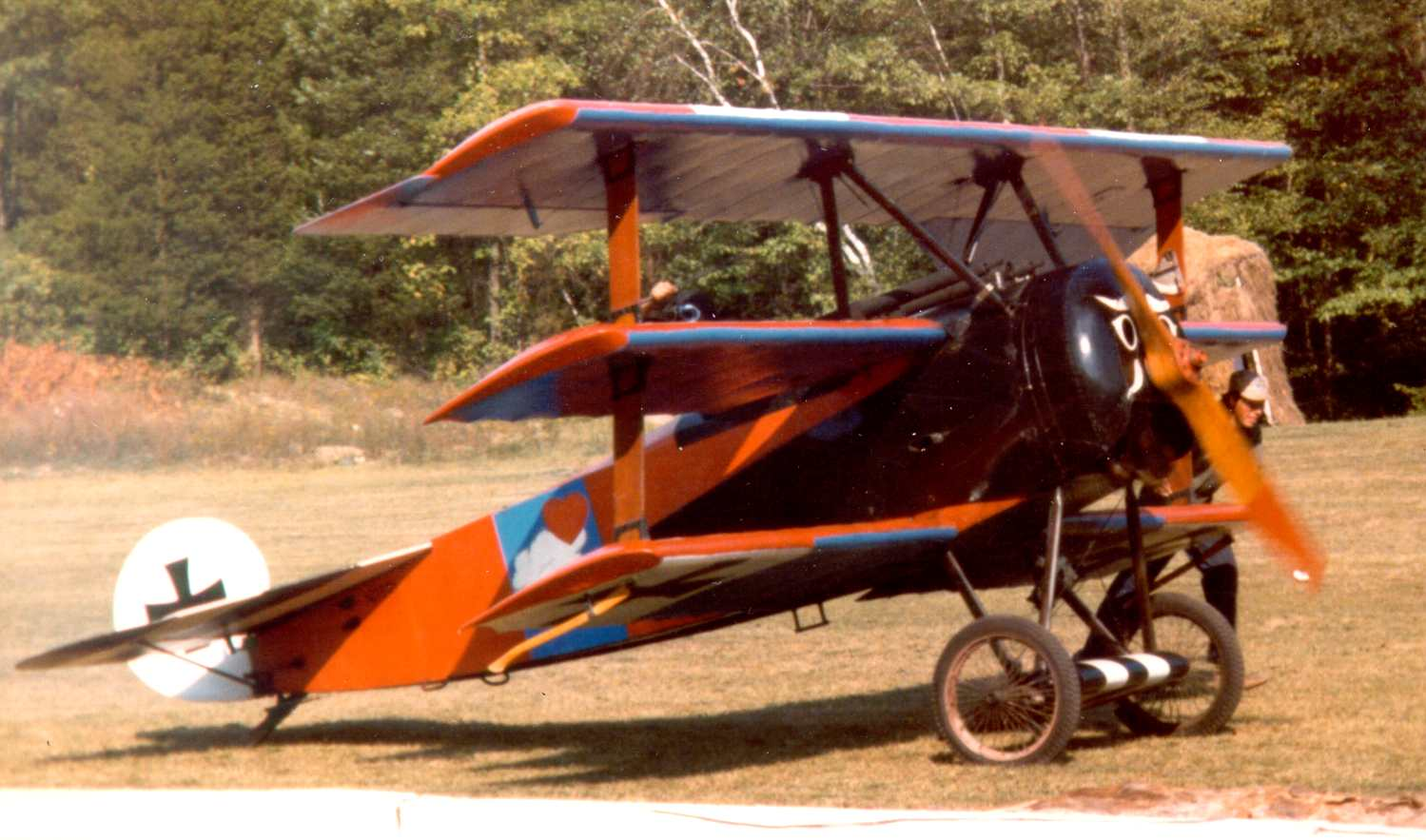
Cole Palen's N3221 rotary-powered Dr.I reproduction

In 1951, aviation enthusiast Cole Palen purchased six World War I-era aircraft from a museum at Roosevelt Field on Long Island. He founded the aerodrome in 1958, partially inspired by the Shuttleworth Collection in England. Palen collected aircraft "spanning from 1900 up to the start of World War II," restoring and regularly flying them at airshows as his alter-ego, the "Black Baron of Rhinebeck." These airshows continue today from mid-June through mid-October, and biplane rides are available before and after events. The first air show took place in 1960, and the aerodrome was "officially incorporated in 1966."

When Palen died in 1993, the non-profit Rhinebeck Aerodrome Museum assumed ownership. The museum is chartered by the New York State Board of Regents.

At Rhinebeck on August 17, 2008, around 4 p.m. during the performance of a simulated dogfight at the aerodrome, Vincent Nasta of Wading River, New York died of injuries sustained when his plane crashed in to a heavily wooded area 1000 feet from the runway and performance area. The aircraft being used was part of the aerodrome's World War I collection and was reported to be a reproduction French Nieuport 24, obtained from a New Zealand facility. It was the first fatality during an airshow at the facility.

The museum's gift shop and model collection were destroyed in a fire on 20 August 2015.

The museum proposed to replace two deteriorated pole aircraft hangars with a new 6,000 sq ft (560 m^{2}) steel hangar in November 2020.

By 2023, the museum had begun replacing some of its older infrastructure. This included a new 6,400 sq ft (590 m^{2}) hangar completed by that April. It received approval for three additional projects in April 2024, including a new entrance and a hangar to replace two older ones.

Brian T. Coughlin, a museum board member, was killed on 5 October 2024, when the museum's replica Fokker D.VIII crashed at the south end of the runway.

A proposal for a phased expansion of the museum was met with opposition from nearby residents in May 2026. It called for the demolition of approximately 14,000-square-foot (1,300 m^{2}) of buildings and their replacement with 66,000-square-foot (6,100 m^{2}) of new structures. Residents expressed concerns about recent aircraft accidents and that the expansion would change the character of the museum. Specifically, whether it could lead to increased commercialization that may negative affects on the surrounding area. The museum responded that no spectators or residents have ever been injured by an accident and the development was necessary to care for the aircraft. It also cited over 150 letters of support it received from aviators and historians around the county. After a second public hearing in June, the town planning board voted to postpone action on the plan until early August.

== Facilities ==
The museum consists of a number of buildings, including the Avro, Number 1 and Roosevelt Field Hangars.

== Aircraft ==
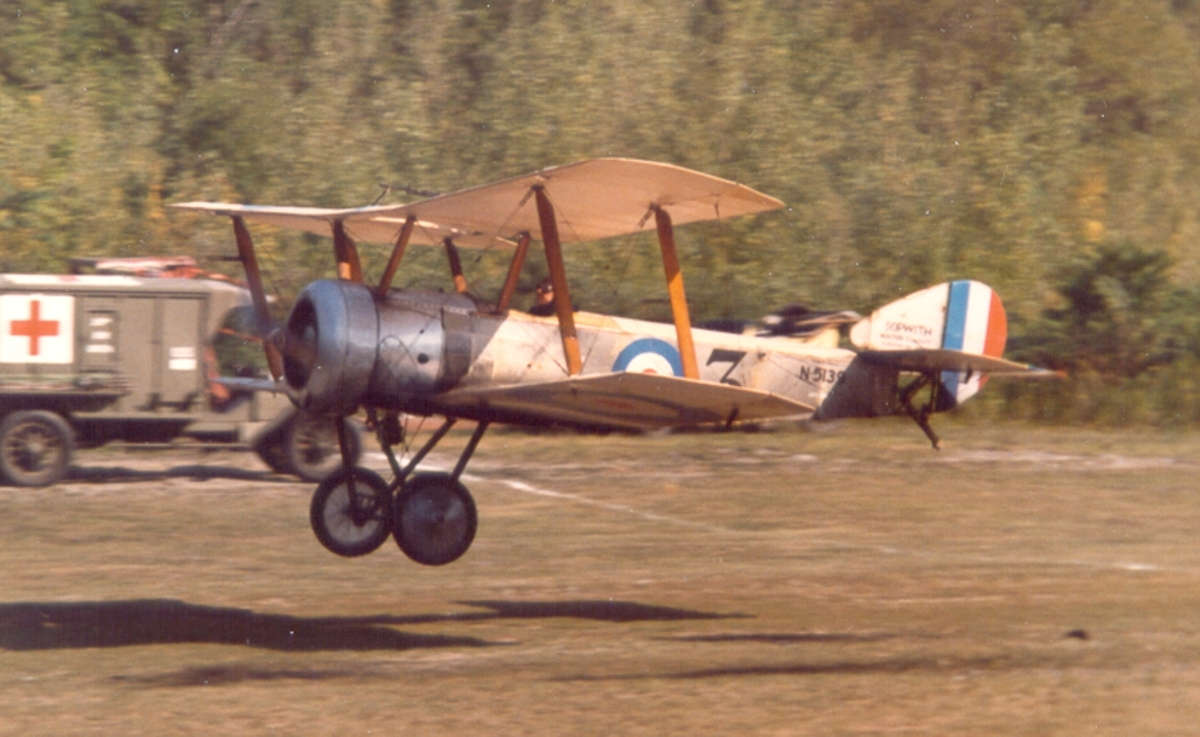
Richard King's reproduction Sopwith Pup, now at Owls Head Transportation Museum in Maine.

Old Rhinebeck Aerodrome features numerous aircraft ranging from Wright-era reconstructions to biplanes and monoplanes of the 1930s. Among Palen's earliest additions to the museum in the mid-1960s was a Fokker Triplane reproduction, powered with a vintage Le Rhône 9J 110 hp rotary engine. It was built by Cole Palen for flight in his weekend airshows as early as 1967 and actively flown (mostly by Cole Palen) in the weekend airshows at Old Rhinebeck until the late 1980s. This aircraft, and a pair of Dr.I reproductions, each powered by radial engines, were flown for nearly two decades by Palen. Both Cole's first rotary-engined reproduction and the second of the stationary radial-powered reproductions are now on static display. One of these is on loan at the New England Air Museum with the Le Rhône engine.

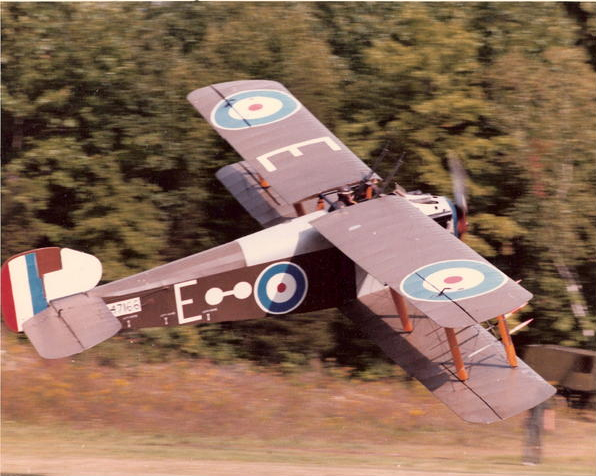
ORA's Dolphin in one of the weekend airshows, mid-1980s

The Allied opponent for Palen's triplane in the early years was mostly provided by a Sopwith Pup. It was begun in May 1964 and first flown three years later (May 1967) by his friend Richard King, the co-founder with Palen of the aerodrome, who flew his authentic 80-hp Le Rhône 9C-powered Pup reproduction in Old Rhinebeck's weekend airshows for many years. He finally retired the aircraft in the 1980s from active flying and eventually sold the aircraft in 1992 to the Owls Head Transportation Museum in Maine. It has returned and flies regularly,

In 1971 a replica was produced of the 1910 Short S.29 using a 60 hp ENV V-8 engine. An accurate Sopwith Dolphin reproduction was built by Palen, the first known airworthy reproduction of the Dolphin ever known to have been attempted. Powered by a vintage direct-drive Hispano-Suiza V-8 engine, this aircraft regularly flew at Palen's weekend air shows from 1980 onward. In September 1990, the aircraft's engine suffered a fuel pump failure, resulting in a crash landing into the trees surrounding the Old Rhinebeck museum's airstrip. The aircraft never directly struck the ground in the crash, and largely remained suspended in the tree canopy after the accident. There was little damage to the reproduction Dolphin's airframe and no injuries to the pilot. The Dolphin was placed on static display until November 2007, when Old Rhinebeck Aerodrome began restoring it to flying condition. When completed, the aircraft will once again be painted in the markings of No. 19 Squadron.

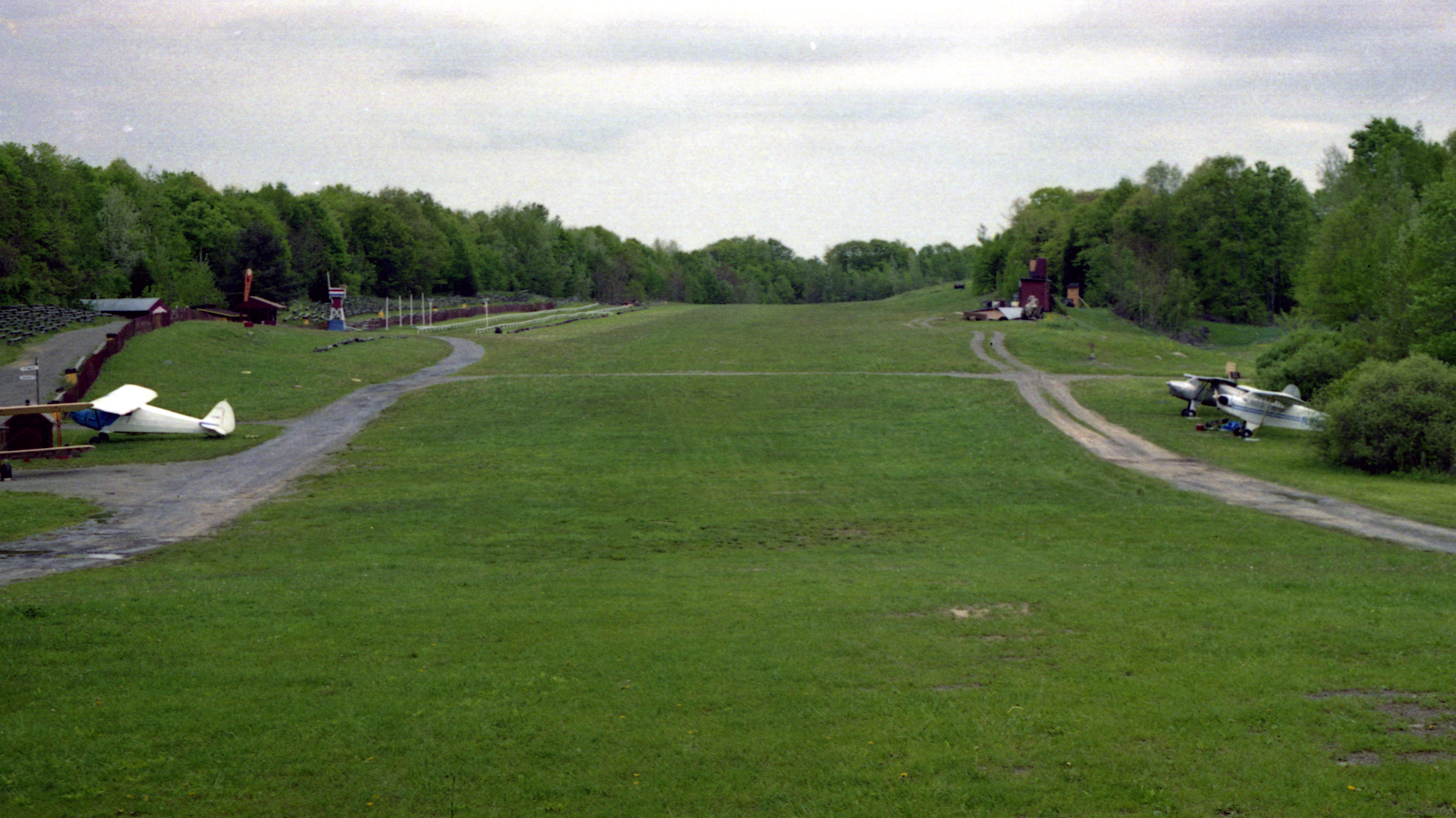
Runway at Old Rhinebeck in 1991

Another German aircraft in the collection is an Albatros D.Va reproduction, which in 2015 was finished in the colors of Eduard Ritter von Schleich. It is powered by a modified six-cylinder "uprighted" Fairchild Ranger engine, fitted after the original liquid-cooled Mercedes D.II engine sheared its crankshaft.

The collection also includes a restored 1909 Bleriot XI (including an original three cylinder Anzani radial engine) that is believed to be the second oldest airworthy aircraft in the world

In 2016 an accurate reproduction of the Spirit of St. Louis was added to the collection following a 20-year building process and first test flight in December 2015.

Old Rhinebeck Aerodrome has had two airworthy Fokker D.VIII reproductions, each powered with a restored Gnome 9N Monosoupape rotary engine, both built by Brian Coughlin of New York state. These have since been sold, to Javier Arango in California for his private collection of reproduction WW I aircraft and to Kermit Weeks' Fantasy of Flight living aviation museum in Florida. One of the Coughlin DVIII Fokkers returned to the Aerodrome in 2016.

== Events ==
Early aerodrome shows "led to a philosophy" of not merely showing the aircraft in their "natural environment," but also offering an "entertaining day out" for families. The aerodrome "allows families to take self-guided tours and get up close to airplanes and artifacts in the collection." There is also a "ground show melodrama" based on a Perils of Pauline parody, with characters including "Trudy Truelove, Sir Percy Goodfellow, Pierre Loop de Loop, and the evil Black Baron of Rhinebeck," said to be especially enjoyable for children.

Several vintage auto club and vintage aircraft type-specific events occur at the aerodrome. The event schedule has also included radio-controlled scale aircraft fly-in events for scale models of 1903–1939 era planes, an era also covered by the museum's own full scale aircraft. These events have occurred since 1966, with at least one aeromodeling event held each year in early September following the Labor Day holiday, in co-operation with a local Academy of Model Aeronautics-chartered RC model aircraft club. Entrants come from places as distant as Canada and Florida.
