= New Standard Aircraft Company =

- Industry: Aerospace
- Founded: 1927
- Headquarters: Paterson, New Jersey
- Key people: Ivan R. Gates, co-founder; Charles H. Day, co-founder, president
- Products: General aviation aircraft
- Subsidiaries: New Standard Flying Services

The New Standard Aircraft Company was an airplane manufacturing company based in the United States. It operated from 1927 until 1931.

== Corporate history ==
The company was originally formed as the Gates-Day Aircraft Company on October 17, 1927, in Paterson, New Jersey. The founders were Ivan R. Gates (owner of the famous Gates Flying Circus) and Charles H. Day (an aviation engineer with the Standard Aircraft Corporation). The company initially updated the Standard Aircraft Corporation's Standard J-1 United States Army aircraft trainer and then sold it on the civilian market. The firm built a number of biplanes on the J-1 model, including the Gates-Day D-25, GD-23, and GD-24.

Day left the company in April 1928, and Charles L. Augur became its new president. With more stable finances, the company changed its name to the New Standard Aircraft Company on December 29, 1928. The company at one time considered merging with six other, unnamed aviation firms to form a much larger manufacturing concern, but this plan was never acted on. The company continued to develop a large line of aircraft, but the onset of the Great Depression left it significantly weakened. Day returned to the firm as president in 1930, but sold his financial interest in the company in the spring of 1931. The company went bankrupt later that year.

Despondent over the collapse of his company, Gates committed suicide on November 24, 1932.

== Aircraft developed ==
- Gates-Day GD-24 – precursor to New Standard D series; three were built
- New Standard D-24 – production version of GD-24; four were built and two were converted from GD-24s
- New Standard D-25 – five-seat "joy-rider"
  - New Standard D-25A – 225 hp Wright J-6
  - New Standard D-25B – 300 hp Wright J-6 crop-duster produced by White Aircraft Co. in 1940
  - New Standard D-25C – alternative designation of D-29S
  - New Standard D-25X – modified D-25; construction number 203
  - New Standard NT-2
- New Standard D-26 – three-seat business/executive transport
  - New Standard D-26A & D-26B – D-26 with 225 hp Wright J6
- New Standard D-27 – single seat mail/cargo carrier
  - New Standard D-27A – D-27 with night flying equipment
- New Standard D-28 – floatplane conversion of D-26
- New Standard D-29 – initial version 85 hp Cirrus Mk3 engine, 1 built.
  - New Standard D-29A – production aircraft with 100 hp Kinner K-5
    - New Standard NT-1 – Six New Standard D-29As supplied to the United States Navy as the NT-1 trainer in 1930.
  - New Standard D-29 Special – D-29A with Menasco B-4.
  - New Standard D-29 S – Sport version with coupe cockpit (also known as D-25C).
- New Standard D-30 – floatplane modified D-25
- New Standard D-31 Special – D-29A with Kinner B-5.
- New Standard D-32 Special – 3 seater D-29A with Wright J-6.
- New Standard D-33 Special – 3 seater D-29A with Kinner B-5.
