= New Standard D-25 =

American airplane

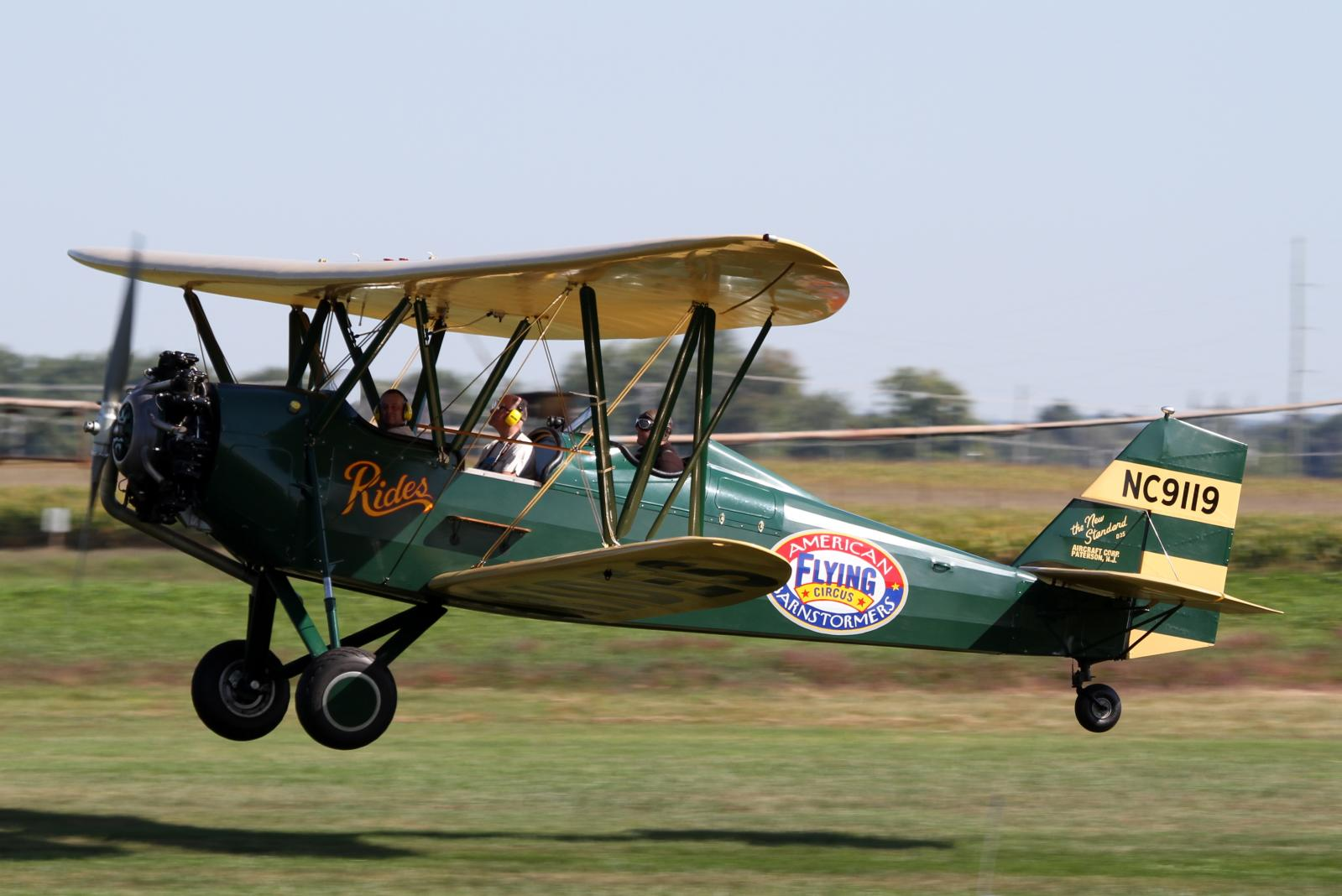

General information
- Type: Joy-rider, Barnstormer, Crop-Sprayer, Mail Carrier
- National origin: USA
- Manufacturer: New Standard Aircraft Company
- Designer: Charles Healy Day
- Number built: 45

History
- First flight: 1929
- Developed from: Gates-Day GD-24

The New Standard D-25 was a five-seat agricultural and joy-riding aircraft produced in the US from 1928.

== Development ==
Designed by Charles H. Day, the D-25 was developed from his four-passenger D-24 which was equipped with a 180 hp (134 kW) Hispano-Suiza E eight-cylinder radial engine and built in Paterson, New Jersey. This was underpowered, and production switched to a 220 hp (164 kW) Wright J-5 engine, the new model being renamed the D-25. It received its type certificate (No.108) in February 1929. The retail price was $9,750. Some of the existing D-24s were converted to D-25 specification, including one by its owner, famous barnstormer Johnny Miller.

== Construction ==
The D-25 was constructed primarily from Duralumin and wood. Duralumin stringers were used for the fuselage, with duralumin sheets riveted onto them. Unlike the fuselage, the wings were mostly of wood, with a main spar made of spruce, basswood for the stringers, and plywood for reinforcement, along with fabric coverings for the wing area and control surfaces. The D series was quite distinctive in having sesquiplane wings with the upper wing, of much bigger span and chord, supported on tall cabane and interplane struts.

== Operational use ==
Seating for four passengers was provided in the open front cockpit, described as "chummy", with the pilot in the single seat open rear cockpit. Variations in seating arrangement reflected the role of the different variants. The rugged structure gave the New Standard Ds a long-life, leading to the respectable number that survived the abuse of joy-riding, mail carrying and crop dusting for many years. New Standard ceased trading in 1930 but production restarted with around nine being built from 1933 through 1937, most of these being used for crop dusting.

Two D-25As that had been confiscated from smugglers were acquired by the US Coast Guard in 1935, designated NT-2.

== Variants ==
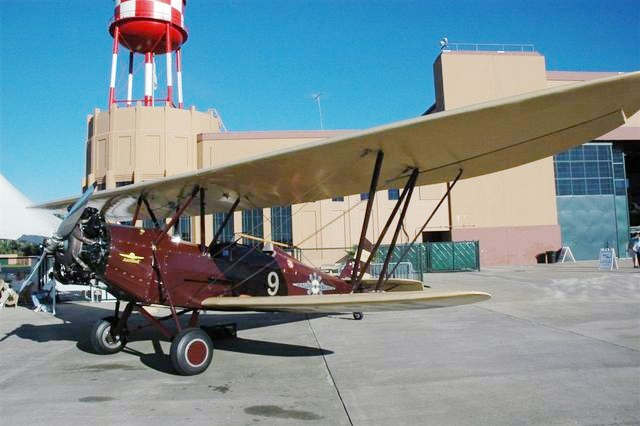
1929 New Standard D-25 of Waldo Wright's Flying Service at Fantasy of Flight

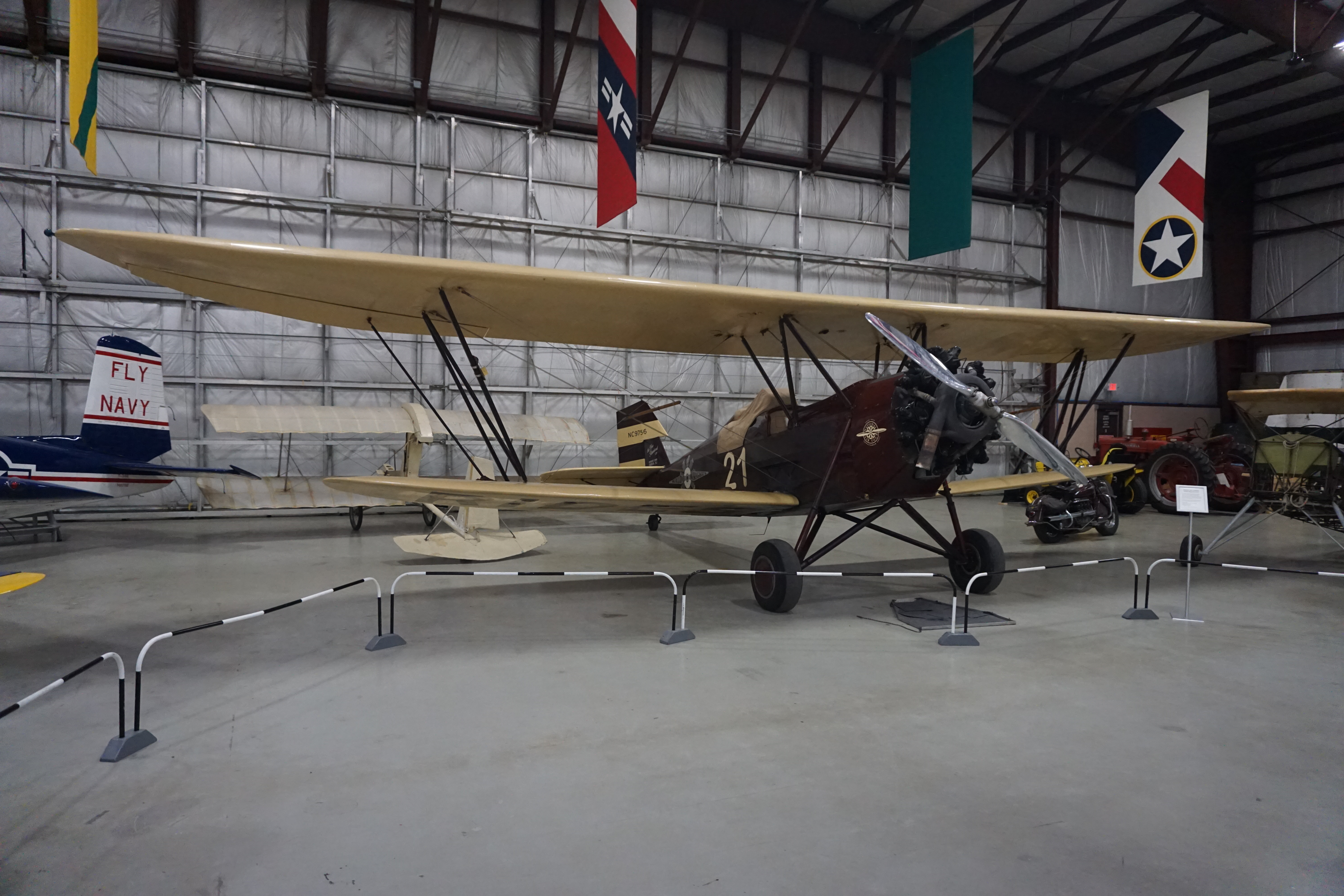
New Standard D-25A at the Air Zoo

- Gates-Day GD-24 - precursor to New Standard D series 3 built.
- New Standard D-24 - production version of GD-24 4 built + 2 converted from GD-24.
- New Standard D-25 - 5-seat "joy-rider"
  - New Standard D-25A - 225 hp Wright J-6
  - New Standard D-25B - 300 hp Wright J-6 crop-duster produced by White Aircraft Co. 1940
  - New Standard D-25C - alternative designation of D-29S
  - New Standard D-25X - modified D-25 construction number 203.
  - New Standard NT-2 - 2 x D-25 impounded from whiskey smugglers, donated to US Coast Guard.
- New Standard D-26 - 3-seat business/executive transport.
  - New Standard D-26A & D-26B - D-26 with 225 hp Wright J-6.
- New Standard D-27 - single seat mail/cargo carrier
  - New Standard D-27A - D-27 with night flying equipment
- New Standard D-28 - floatplane conversion of D-26
- New Standard D-30 - floatplane modified D-25
- New Standard D-25 - New production of modified D-25As

== Operators ==
United States

- Alaskan Airways (D-25)
- Clifford Ball Inc. (D-27)
- Goodfolk & O'Tymes Biplane Rides (D-25)
- Cole Palen's Old Rhinebeck Aerodrome (2 D-25s, N176H active, N19157 undergoing restoration
- United States Coast Guard

== Specifications (D-25) ==
Data from Rhinebeck's Joyrider

General characteristics

- Crew: 1
- Capacity: 4
- Length: 26 ft 6 in (8.08 m)
- Wingspan: 45 ft 0 in (13.72 m)
- Height: 10 ft 2 in (3.10 m)
- Wing area: 350 sq ft (32.5 m^{2})
- Empty weight: 2,010 lb (914 kg)
- Gross weight: 3,400 lb (1,550 kg)
- Powerplant: 1 × Wright J-5 , 220 hp (160 kW)

Performance

- Maximum speed: 110 mph (176 km/h, 96 kn)
- Cruise speed: 95 mph (153 km/h, 83 kn)
- Range: 480 mi (773 km, 420 nmi)
- Service ceiling: 20,000 ft (6,100 m)
- Rate of climb: 1,000 ft/min (5.1 m/s)

== See also ==
Aircraft of comparable role, configuration, and era

- Pitcairn Mailwing
- Spartan C-3
