= Aviation in Florida =

Aviation in a US state

- Aviation in the United States
- Florida State Flag

Airports
- Commercial – primary: 20
- Commercial – non-primary: 22
- General aviation: 58
- Other public-use airports: 29
- Military and other airports: 24

First flight
- Balloon - 1878; Heavier-than-air - 1914

The first aeronautical event in Florida was presented on January 28, 1878, when a balloon flew over Jacksonville. Florida has since hosted four major aviation events.

== Events ==
- January 1914 - St. Petersburg-Tampa Airboat Line becomes the first airline in the world using heavier-than-air vehicles.
- December 1916 - Navy takes delivery of its first airship, the DN-1
- April 1, 1926 - Florida Airways starts Commercial Air Mail (CAM) Service.
- Sun 'n Fun air show started in 1974.

== Aircraft manufacturers ==
- Comp Air - Merritt Island, Florida
- Piper Aircraft - Vero Beach
- Progressive Aerodyne - Tavares, Florida

== Aerospace ==
- Florida Institute of Technology
- Embry–Riddle Aeronautical University

== Airports ==
- List of airports in Florida

== Commercial service ==
- Air Florida based in Florida from 1971 to 1984
- Red Arrow Flying Service - Chalk's Ocean Airways - Chalk's International Airlines founded in Miami in 1917.
- National Airlines founded in 1934.

== Organizations ==
- Florida Aviation Association - Founded in 1936 in Orlando
- Space Florida

== Government and military ==
- Florida Department of Transportation
- The National Oceanic and Atmospheric Administration bases its aircraft at the Aircraft Operations Center in Lakeland.

== Museums ==
- Air Force Armament Museum, Valparaiso, Florida
- Air Force Space and Missile Museum, Cape Canaveral Space Force Station
- Airport Museum (Melbourne, Florida)
- DeLand Naval Air Station Museum, DeLand, Florida
- Fantasy of Flight, Polk City, Florida
- Florida Air Museum, Lakeland, Florida
- Kennedy Space Center Visitor Complex, Merritt Island, Florida
- Kissimmee Air Museum
- National Naval Aviation Museum, Pensacola, Florida
- United States Astronaut Hall of Fame, south of Titusville, Florida
- US Space Walk of Fame, Titusville, Florida
- Valiant Air Command Warbird Museum, Titusville, Florida
- Wings of Dreams Aviation Museum, Keystone Heights, Florida
- Wings Over Miami, Tamiami Airport, Miami
