= Brown Aircraft Co. =

American aircraft manufacturer

- Type: Aircraft design and manufacture
- Founded: 1931
- Defunct: 1945
- Fate: ceased operations 1945
- Headquarters: Montebello, California,
- Key people: Lawrence W. Brown
- Products: racing and personal aircraft

The Brown Aircraft Co was an American aircraft manufacturer of the 1930s and 1940s.

== History ==
During 1926 Lawrence W. Brown established a small aircraft modification and design operation at Clover Field Santa Monica, California. His initial project was to modify a Thomas-Morse S-4 as a parasol monoplane with a 90 h.p. Curtiss OX-5 engine. In 1929 he built a similar two-seat aircraft powered by a 260 h.p. Menasco-Salmson engine.

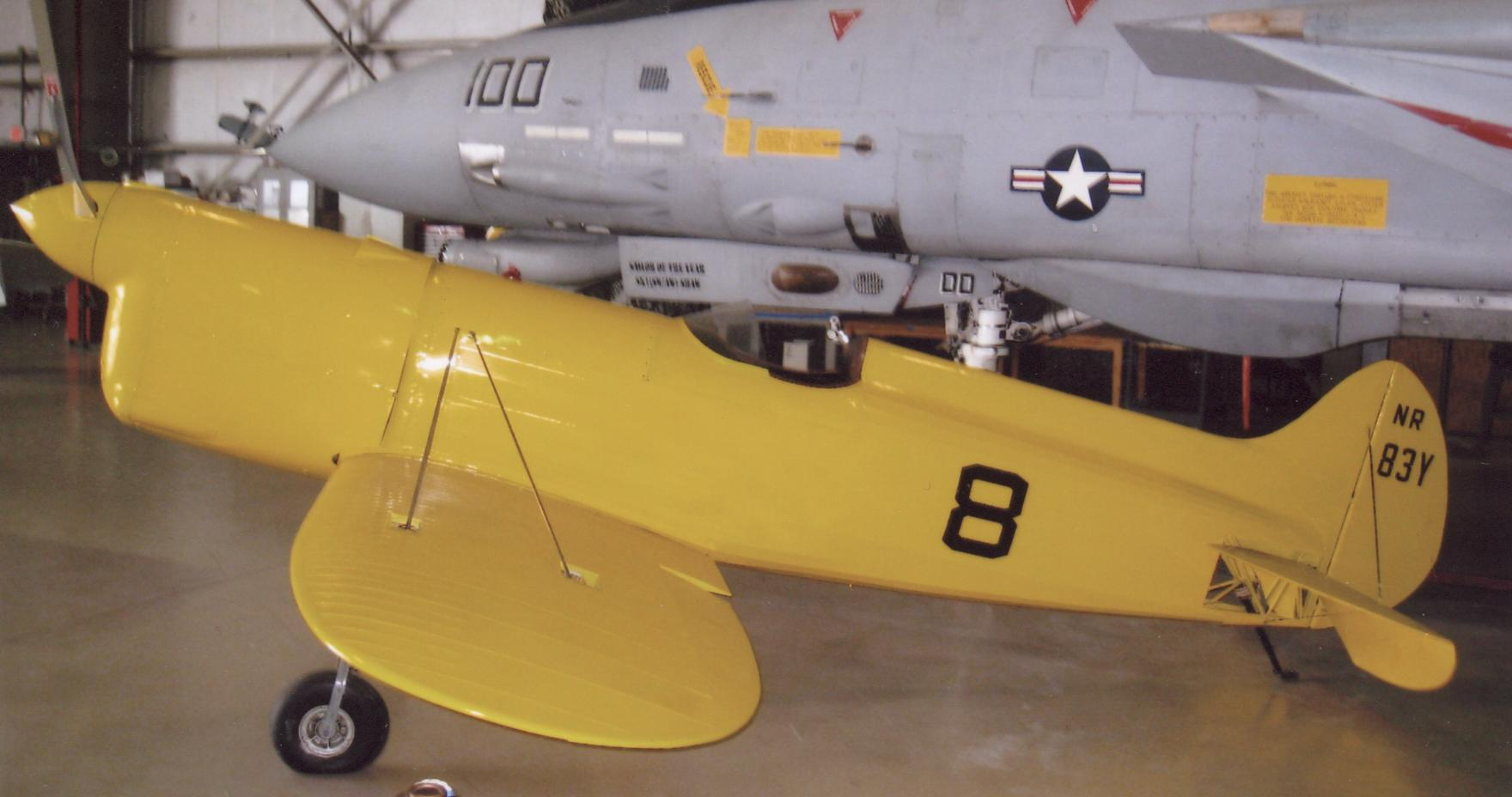
The Brown B-1 Racer displayed in the Wings Over Miami air museum in April 2009

In 1931, Brown moved to Montebello, California and established the Brown Aircraft Co.. From 1933 he built a series of small low-wing racing monoplanes and these competed in the major air racing meetings held in the United States. Postwar he built the L-20 Brownie, a high-wing monoplane intended for operation by private pilots, but on Brown's death on 25 December 1945, the firm's activities ceased. The sole surviving original aircraft built by the firm is the Brown B-1 Racer which is preserved in the Wings over Miami aircraft museum at Tamiami Airport near Miami.

== Aircraft ==
B-1 Racer
1 built 1933, crashed but rebuilt in 1947 and preserved.
B-2 Racer "Miss Los Angeles"
1 built 1934, 160 hp (119 kW) Menasco B6 engine, raced by Roy Minor and Marion McKeen. Crashed 1939, restored with wider-span wings but destroyed in 1938, pilot Lee Williams killed. This airplane was named the Miss Los Angeles. A replica built by Ed Marquart and Bill Turner, renowned replicator of Golden Age racers, is currently part of the collection at Fantasy of Flight in Polk City, Florida.
B-3
1 built 1936, improved B-2 with closed cockpit and 290 hp (216 kW) Menasco D-6, maximum speed 225 mph.
B-3 Super Sport
1 built 1935 with two seats and supercharged Menasco engine, maximum speed 200 mph.
L-20 Brownie
1 built 1945. Single-seat open-cockpit high parasol-wing aircraft with 25 hp (19 kW) Haines M-2 pusher engine. Intended for use by private pilots. Development ceased after Brown's death.
