= Brown B-1 Racer =

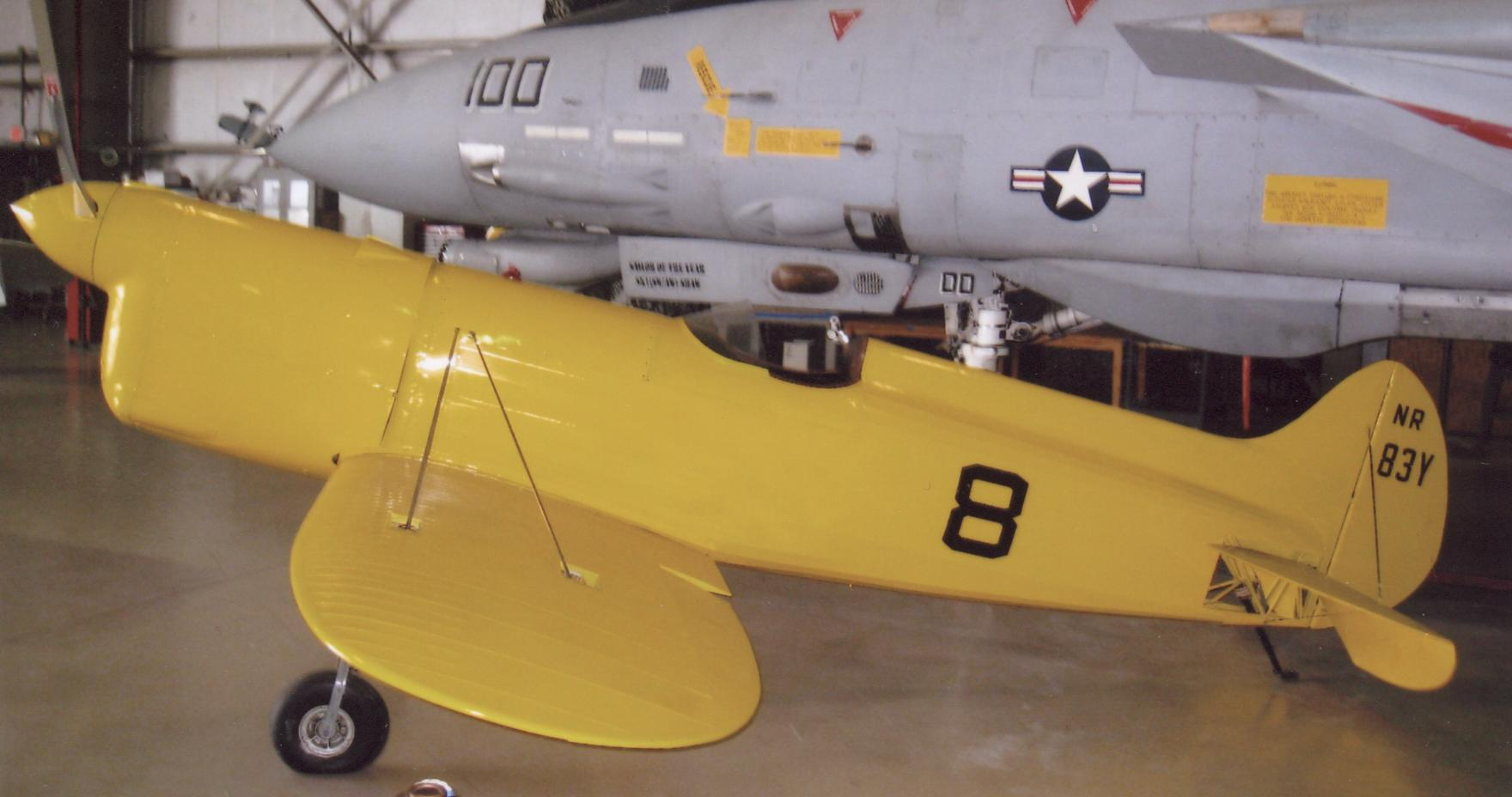
- The B-1 Racer as restored postwar on display in the Wings over Miami aviation museum at Tamiami Airport, near Miami

General information
- Type: Racing aircraft
- National origin: United States
- Manufacturer: Brown Aircraft Co.
- Designer: Dan Holloway
- Status: preserved in a museum
- Primary user: racing pilots
- Number built: 1

History
- Introduction date: 1933
- First flight: 1933
- Retired: circa 1948
- Variants: Brown B-2 Racer; Brown B-3

The Brown B-1 Racer was an American-built small monoplane racing aircraft of the 1930s.

== Design and development ==
The B-1 Racer was built in 1933 by the Brown Aircraft Co. of Montebello, California, which had been founded by Lawrence W. Brown, previously of Clover Field, Santa Monica, California.

The B-1 was designed by Dean Holloway and was intended for competitive flying at the hands of Ralph Bushey. The diminutive aircraft was a low-winged monoplane with an open single-person cockpit and a fixed tail-skid undercarriage.

== Operational history ==
Ralph Bushey raced the aircraft NR83Y in several prewar competitions in the United States, but the aircraft was damaged in a crash after the engine fell out during the race. It was rebuilt in 1947 with a removable closed cabin and powered by an 85 hp (63 kW) Continental C-85 engine.

The aircraft continued to compete as a "midget racer", named Suzie Jayne.

The B-1 was withdrawn from flying in the late 1940s, and is currently owned by Kermit Weeks. The aircraft was on public display at the Fantasy of Flight in Polk City, Florida, alongside the Brown B-2 replica.

== Specifications (as rebuilt in 1947) ==
Data from Aerofiles.com

General characteristics

- Crew: 1
- Length: 16 ft 0 in (4.88 m)
- Wingspan: 18 ft 9 in (5.72 m)
- Powerplant: 1 × Continental C-85 , 85 hp (63 kW)
