= White WW-1 Der Jäger D.IX =

American homebuilt biplane

WW-1 Der Jäger D.IX
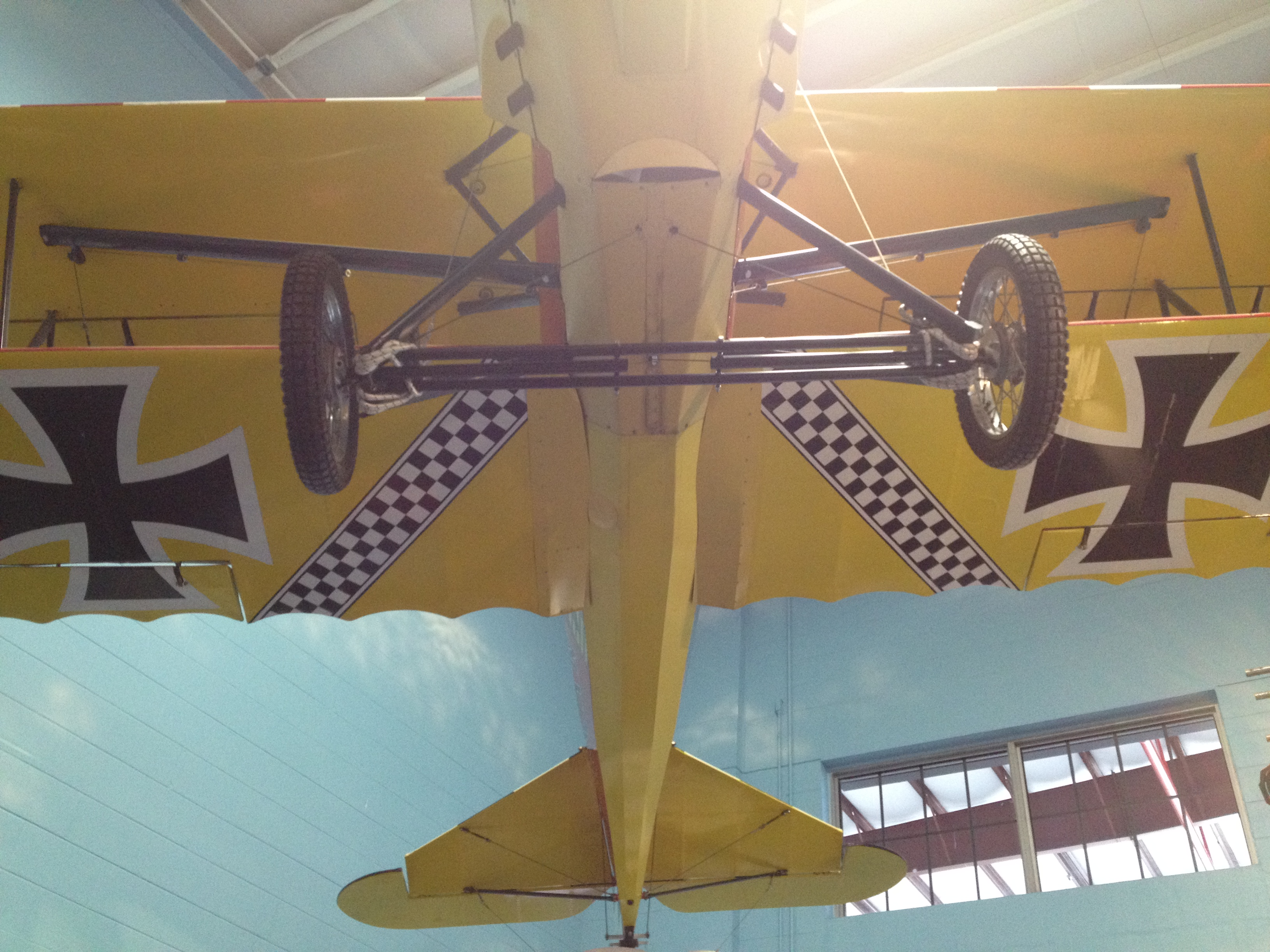
- Kermit Weeks Der Jager

General information
- Type: Homebuilt aircraft
- National origin: United States
- Manufacturer: Stolp/White Aircraft
- Designer: Louis Stolp, Marshal White

History
- Developed from: Stolp SA-500 Starlet

The White WW-1 Der Jäger D.IX also called the Stolp-White WW-1 Der Jäger D.IX/69 is an American homebuilt biplane.

== Design and development ==
The WW-1 Der Jäger D.IX is a single seated, single engine, biplane with conventional landing gear. It is based on the Stolp SA-500 Starlet design. The fuselage is welded steel tubing and wings use spruce wood spars with aircraft fabric covering used throughout. The wings are covered using a scalloped trailing edge pattern.

== Operational history ==
Kermit Weeks built a Der Jäger D.IX as his first homebuilt aircraft. His aircraft is on display at the Fantasy of Flight museum in Florida.

== Specifications (White WW-1 Der Jäger D.IX) ==
Data from EAA

General characteristics

- Crew: 1
- Length: 17 ft (5.2 m)
- Wingspan: 20 ft (6.1 m)
- Wing area: 123 sq ft (11.4 m^{2})
- Empty weight: 620 lb (281 kg)
- Powerplant: 1 × Lycoming O-235C horizontally opposed piston aircraft engine, 100 hp (75 kW)
- Propellers: 2-bladed

Performance

== See also ==
Related development

- Stolp SA-500 Starlet

Aircraft of comparable role, configuration, and era Stolp Starduster
