= Stolp SA-500 Starlet =

American light aircraft

SA-500 Starlet
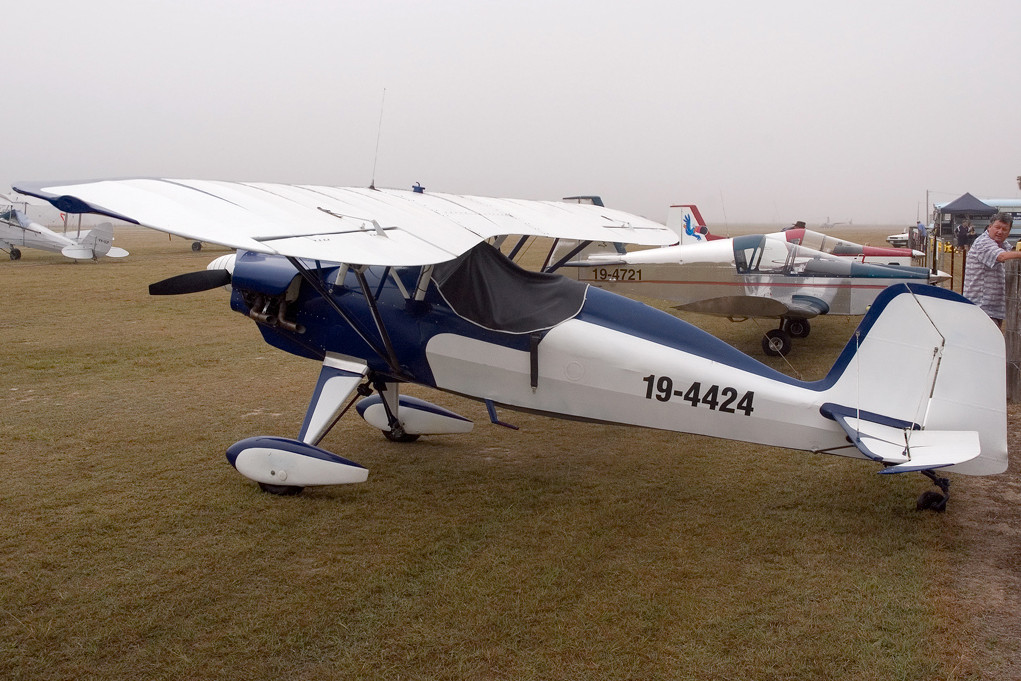

General information
- Type: Amateur-built aircraft
- National origin: United States
- Manufacturer: Aircraft Spruce & Specialty
- Designer: Lou Stolp
- Status: Plans available (2025)
- Number built: 35 (1998)

History
- Variant: White WW-1 Der Jäger D.IX

The Stolp SA-500 Starlet is an American amateur-built aircraft. The aircraft is supplied in the form of plans for amateur construction by Aircraft Spruce & Specialty of Corona, California.

== Design and development ==
The Starlet features a strut-braced parasol wing, a single-seat open cockpit with a windshield, fixed conventional landing gear and a single engine in tractor configuration.

The aircraft fuselage is made from welded 4130 steel tubing, while the wing is made from wood and covered in doped aircraft fabric. Its 25 ft (7.6 m) span wing employs a Clark YH airfoil, has an area of 83 sq ft (7.7 m^{2}). The recommended installed power is 65 to 125 hp (48 to 93 kW), and engines used include the 65 hp (48 kW) Volkswagen air-cooled engine, the 80 hp (60 kW) Rotax 912UL, 100 hp (75 kW) Subaru EA-81, Suzuki and small Continental Motors, Inc. powerplants.

The construction time is estimated to be 1400 hours.

== Operational history ==
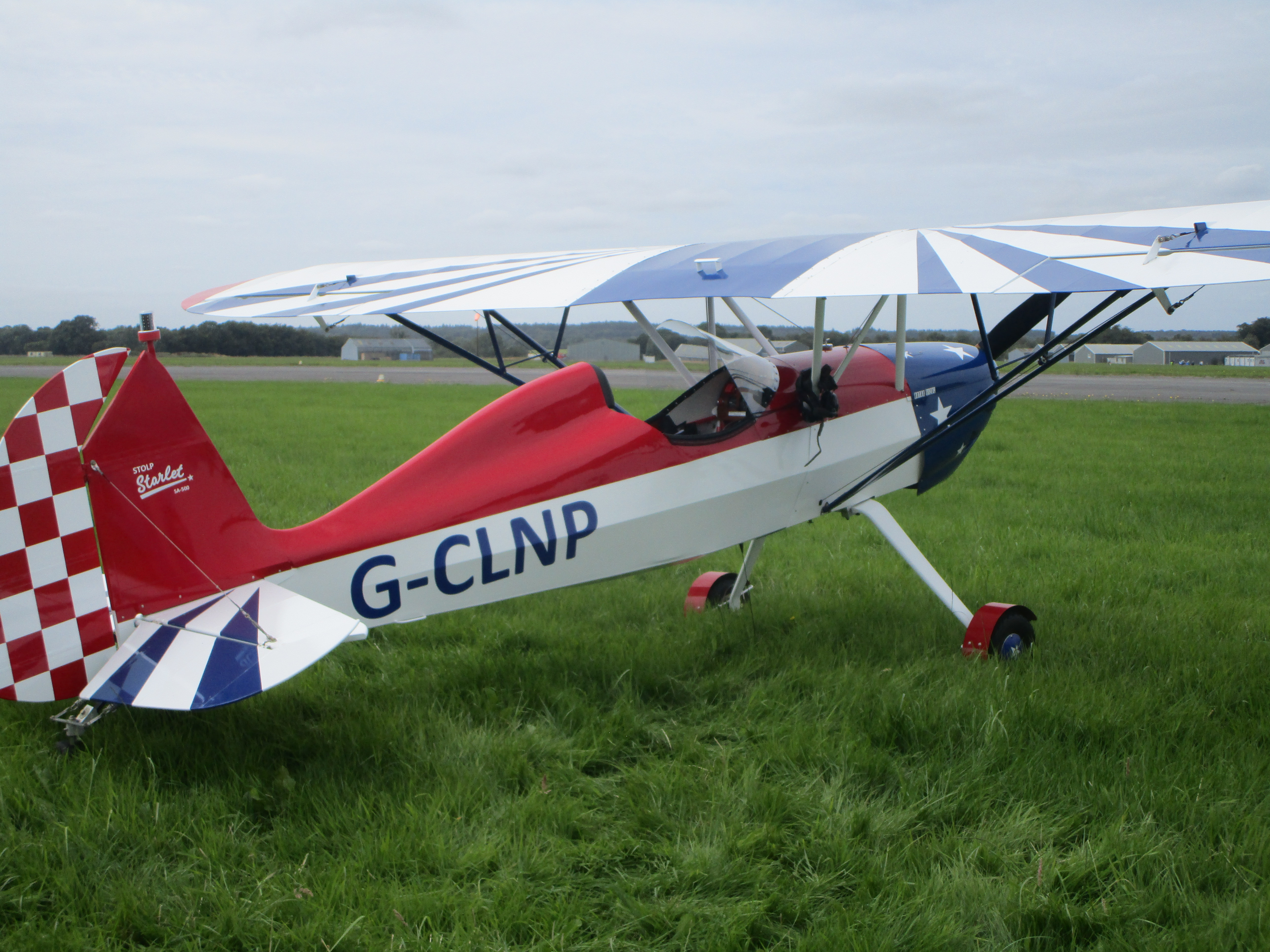
STOLP SA-500 Starlet G-CLNP parked on the grass at Dunkeswell Aerodrome

By 1998, the company reported that 35 aircraft were completed and flying.

== Variants ==
- White WW-1 Der Jäger D.IX A modification to appear as a World War I fighter.

== Specifications (SA-500 Starlet) ==
Data from Bayerl and Aircraft Spruce & Specialty

General characteristics

- Crew: one
- Wingspan: 25 ft (7.6 m)
- Wing area: 83 sq ft (7.7 m^{2})
- Empty weight: 500 lb (227 kg)
- Gross weight: 1,000 lb (454 kg)
- Fuel capacity: 22 U.S. gallons (83 L; 18 imp gal)
- Powerplant: 1 × Volkswagen air-cooled engine four cylinder, air-cooled, 1500 cc four stroke aircraft engine, 65 hp (48 kW)
- Propellers: 2-bladed wooden

Performance

- Maximum speed: 130 mph (210 km/h, 110 kn)
- Cruise speed: 105 mph (169 km/h, 91 kn)
- Range: 630 mi (1,010 km, 550 nmi)
- Wing loading: 12.0 lb/sq ft (59 kg/m^{2})
