= Brown B-2 Racer =

- Brown B-3, c. 1935

General information
- Type: Single-seat touring monoplane; air racer
- National origin: United States
- Manufacturer: Lawrence Brown Aircraft Company
- Designer: Lawrence W. Brown
- Number built: 1

History
- Introduction date: 1934
- First flight: 1934
- Retired: 1939
- Developed from: Brown B-1 Racer
- Variant: Brown B-3

The Brown B-2 Racer was an American-built small monoplane racing aircraft built in 1934.

== Design and development ==
The B-2 Racer was built in 1934 by the Brown Aircraft Co. of Montebello, California, which had been founded by Lawrence W. Brown, previously of Clover Field, Santa Monica, California.

The aircraft, dubbed "Miss Los Angeles" was designed for competitive flying. The low-winged monoplane was designed with a minimal cross-section to reduce drag. It had an open single-person cockpit and a fixed tail-skid undercarriage like its predecessor, the B-1.

== Operational history ==
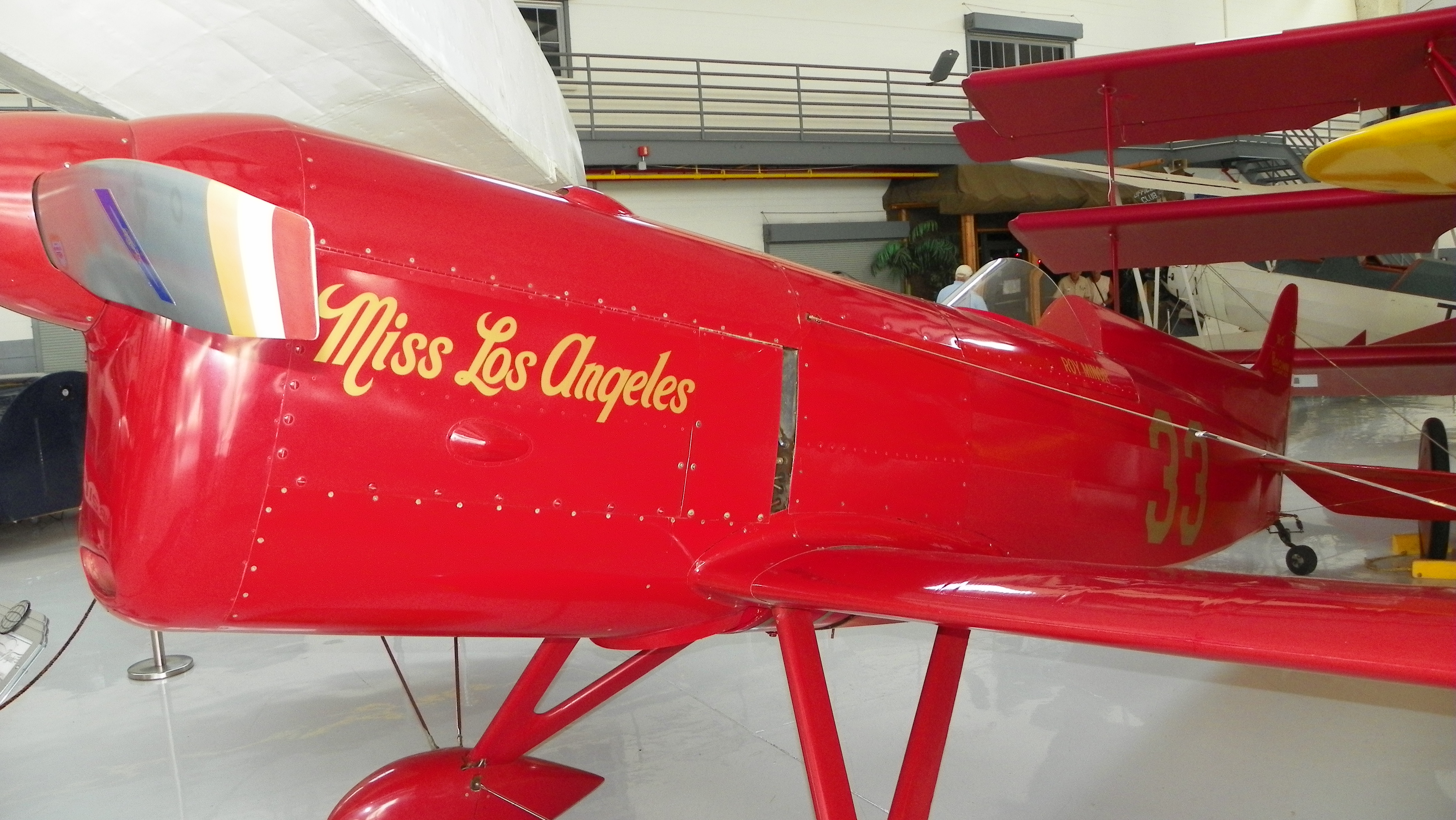
Miss Los Angeles Replica at Fantasy of Flight.

"Miss Los Angeles" made her debut at the 1934 National Air Races fully decked out in a distinctive scarlet paint with lettering and accents in gold leaf. Entered in the inaugural three-race Greve Trophy competition and flown by Roy Minor, she took first place in speed with 213.257 mph. Shortly thereafter "Miss Los Angeles" turned up at the Thompson Trophy race as the only "new" competitor and flew smartly for a second-place trophy.

The B-2 participated in the 1935 National Air Races flown by Marion McKeen, but could manage no better than fifth place for the Greve Trophy. McKeen piloted the plane again in the 1936 and 1937 races, finishing fifth each year.

"Miss Los Angeles" was absent from the 1938 racing season due to crash damage, but turned up at the National Air Races in 1939 with a cantilevered wing of a 21-foot span and retractable landing gear. These modifications were undone when it was determined they were ineffective. During the Greve Trophy races, pilot Lee Williams experienced an engine failure while turning into the scatter pylon, stalled and crashed fatally.

A replica built by Ed Marquart for Bill Turner, renowned replicator of Golden Age racers is currently part of the collection at Fantasy of Flight in Polk City, Florida.

== Specifications ==
Data from Aerofiles.com

General characteristics

- Crew: 1
- Length: 19 ft 10 in (6.04 m)
- Wingspan: 19 ft 3 in (5.87 m)
- Powerplant: 1 × Menasco B-6 , 160 hp (120 kW)

Performance

- Maximum speed: 230.465 mph (370.897 km/h, 200.269 kn)

== See also ==
- Miles & Atwood Special - Earlier design by Lawrence Brown
