= Wings Over Miami Air Museum =

Wings Over Miami

- Location within Florida
- Established: 2001
- Location: Miami Executive Airport, Miami-Dade County, Florida, United States
- Coordinates: 25.64813°N 80.432394°W
- Type: Aviation Museum
- Website: www.wingsovermiamiairmuseum.com

Wings Over Miami is a flying aviation museum of historically significant aircraft, located at Miami Executive Airport in Miami-Dade County, Florida, United States, 13 mi (21 km) southwest of the central business district of Miami.

== History ==
The museum was conceived as a replacement for the Weeks Air Museum which had been located at the airport, but which was moved to Polk County, Florida after having its facility and almost all of its aircraft damaged by Hurricane Andrew in 1992.

The departure of the Weeks collection left an aviation historical deficit in the Miami area. In 2001 four military and classic plane enthusiasts decided to create a new museum to use the facility. The new museum's board was made up of its founders: Walter Orth, Larry Ploucha, Vincent Tirado and Tom Righetti. They agreed from the start that Wings Over Miami would be a flying museum, meaning that aircraft from the collection would be airworthy and would be flown regularly.

The aircraft collection that was assembled included representation from a broad range of aviation history, including vintage aircraft, World War II and the Cold War.

== Aircraft ==
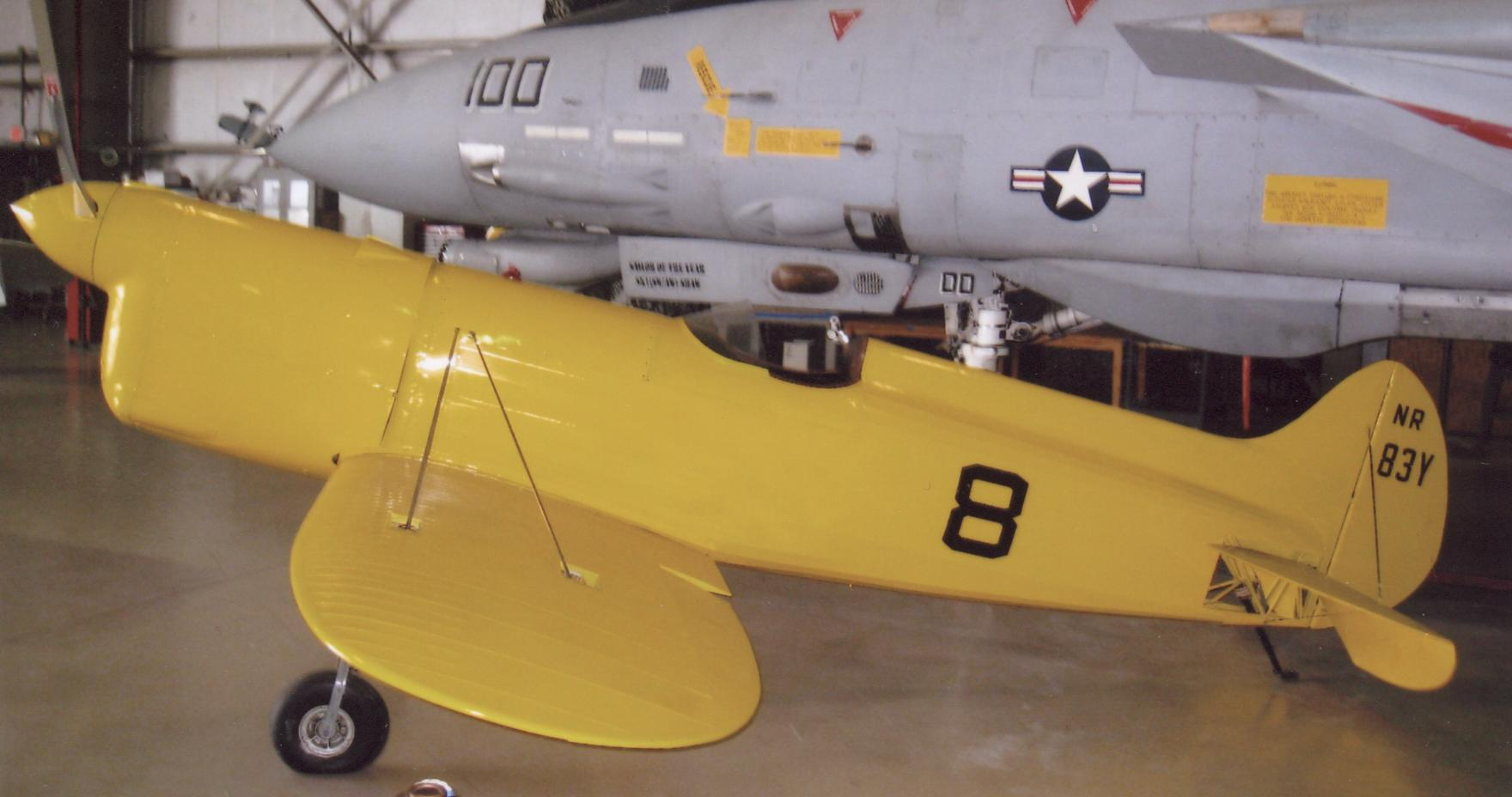
Brown B-1 Racer at Wings Over Miami

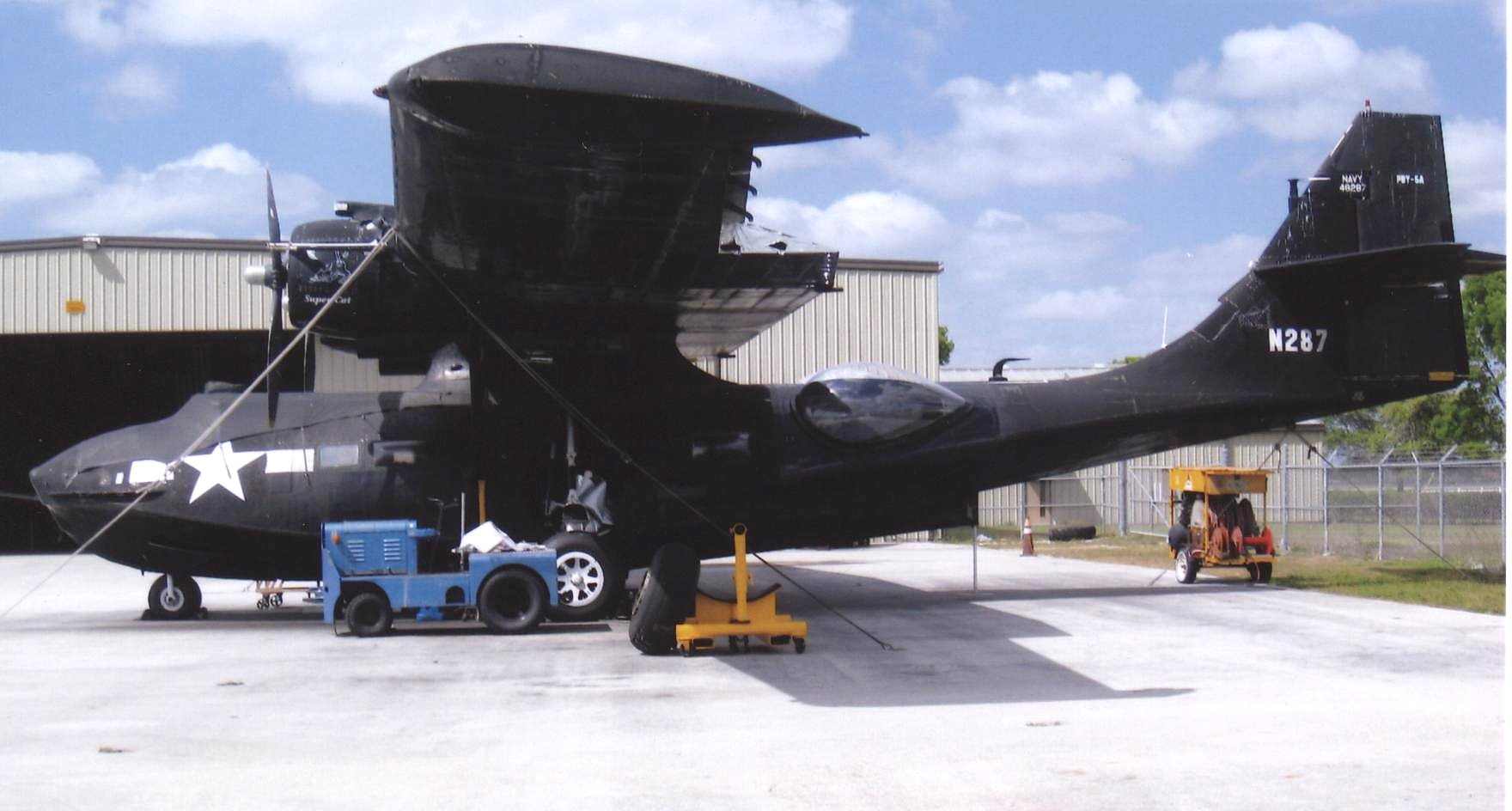
Consolidated PBY-5A Catalina in US Navy markings at the museum

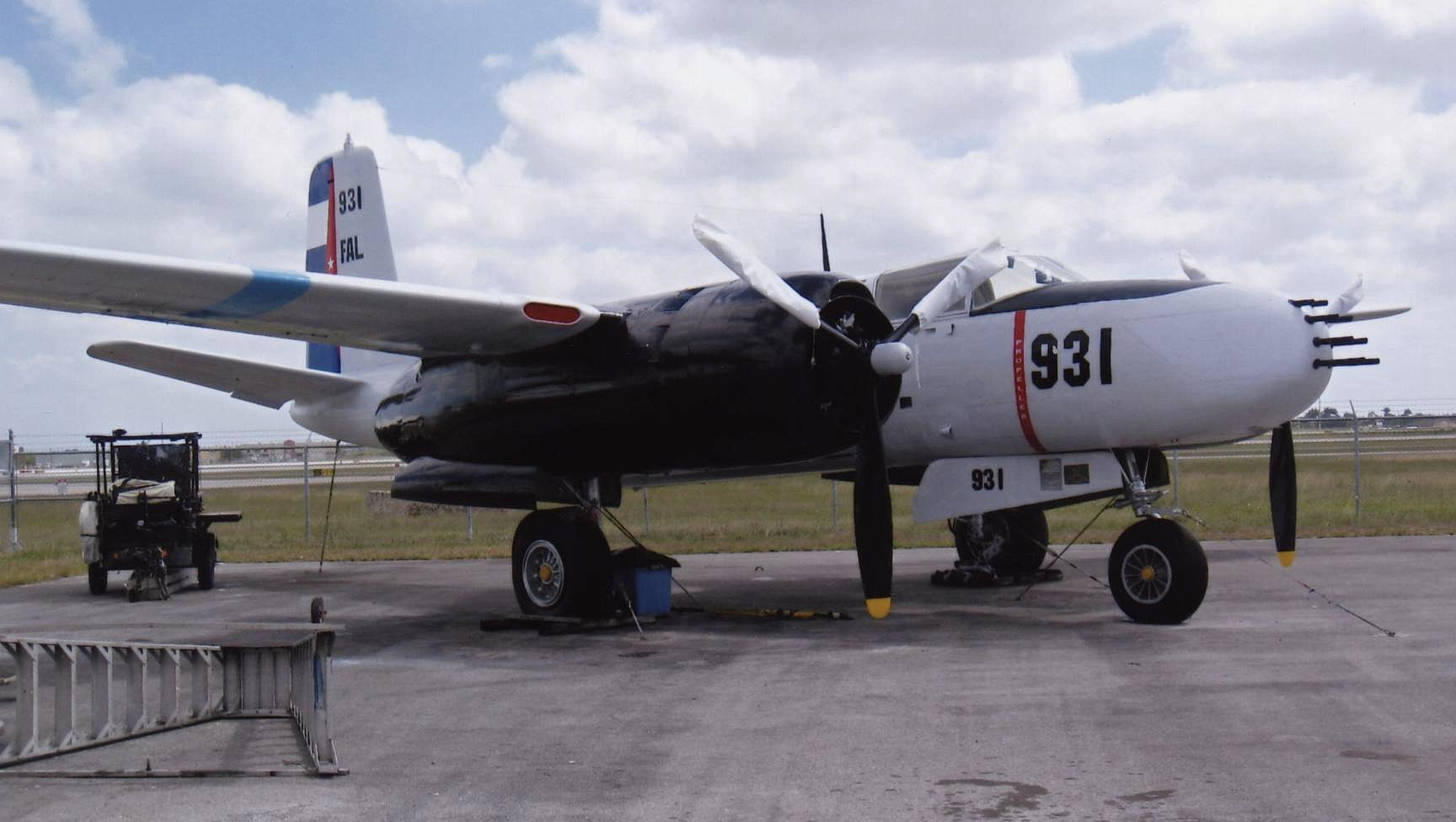
Douglas A-26C Invader in false Cuban Air Force markings

The museum collection includes:

- Aero L29-R Delfín
- Aero L-39C Albatros
- Brown B-1 Racer
- Consolidated PBY-5A Catalina
- Douglas A-26C Invader
- Douglas C-117D
- Grumman F-14D Tomcat
- Ikarus Aero 3-A
- Ryan PT-22
- Nanchang CJ-6A
- North American AT-6D Texan
- North American T-28 Trojan
- North American SNJ-6
- Schweizer SGS 1-26
- Yakovlev Yak-52
