= Brown B-3 =

- Brown B-3, c. 1942

General information
- Type: Single-seat touring monoplane; air racer
- National origin: United States
- Manufacturer: Lawrence Brown Aircraft Company
- Designer: Lawrence W. Brown
- Number built: 1

History
- First flight: 1936
- Developed from: Brown B-2

The Brown B-3 was a 1930s American single-seat touring monoplane and air racer built by the Lawrence Brown Aircraft Company. Only one aircraft was built.

== Design and development ==
The B-3 was based on earlier B-2 Miss Los Angeles single-seat racing monoplane. For the day, some advanced features were included such as Handley Page leading edge slots and single-slotted ailerons and flaps on the wing trailing edge. The B-3 was powered by a 290-horsepower (219 kW) Menasco C6S-4 Super Buccaneer inline piston engine. A proposed two seat-variant, the Brown B-3 Super Sport had two seats in tandem under an enclosed cockpit. No orders were received, and the project died.

Brown B-3 (Metropolitan Airport)

== Operational history ==
Intended as a long-distance racer as well as a touring aircraft, only one Brown B-3 (NX266Y) was built and sold to Dr. Ross Sutherland from Los Angeles. On October 10, 1943, the aircraft was destroyed in a hangar fire at Van Nuys Airport, then known as the Metropolitan Airport.

The Brown B-3 is featured in Flight for Freedom (1943) as the racing aircraft flown by the lead character. The B-3 is featured as a prototype fighter aircraft in Flight Lieutenant (1942) and crashes out of shot in the final scene. The B-3 can also be seen sitting on the ramp during the scene of Humphrey Bogart's famous goodbye in the film Casablanca (1942).

== Specifications ==
Data from

General characteristics

- Crew: 1
- Capacity: 1
- Length: 25 ft 11 in (7.89 m)
- Wingspan: 31 ft 11 in (9.72 m)
- Height: 8 ft 0 in (2.44 m)
- Wing area: 150.0 sq ft (13.94 m^{2})
- Empty weight: 1,850 lb (839 kg)
- Max takeoff weight: 2,650 lb (1,202 kg)
- Powerplant: 1 × Menasco C6S-4 Super Buccaneer inline piston engine, 290 hp (220 kW)
- Propellers: 2-bladed Hamilton Standard

Performance

- Maximum speed: 205 mph (330 km/h, 178 kn)
- Cruise speed: 190 mph (310 km/h, 170 kn)
- Range: 600 mi (966 km, 522 nmi)
- Service ceiling: 18,000 ft (5,486 m)
- Rate of climb: 1,200 ft/min (6.1 m/s)
