= Kermit Weeks =

American pilot and aircraft collector

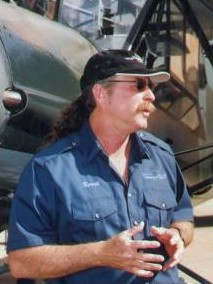
- Born: July 14, 1953 (age 73); Salt Lake City, Utah, U.S.
- Known for: Aerobatics, author
- Spouse: Teresa Blazina
- Relatives: Lewis George Weeks

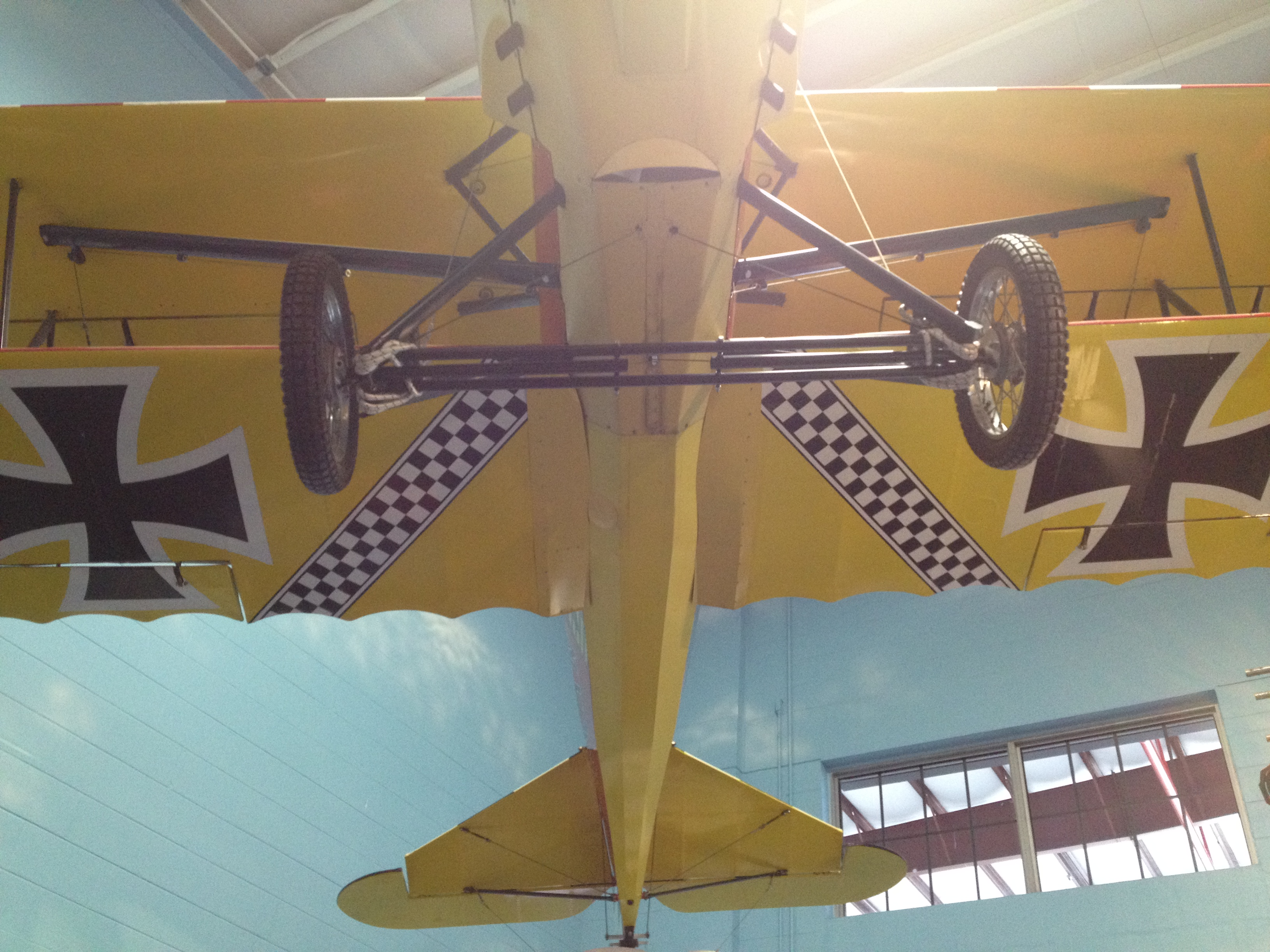
Weeks' first homebuilt aircraft, the Der Jager D-IX

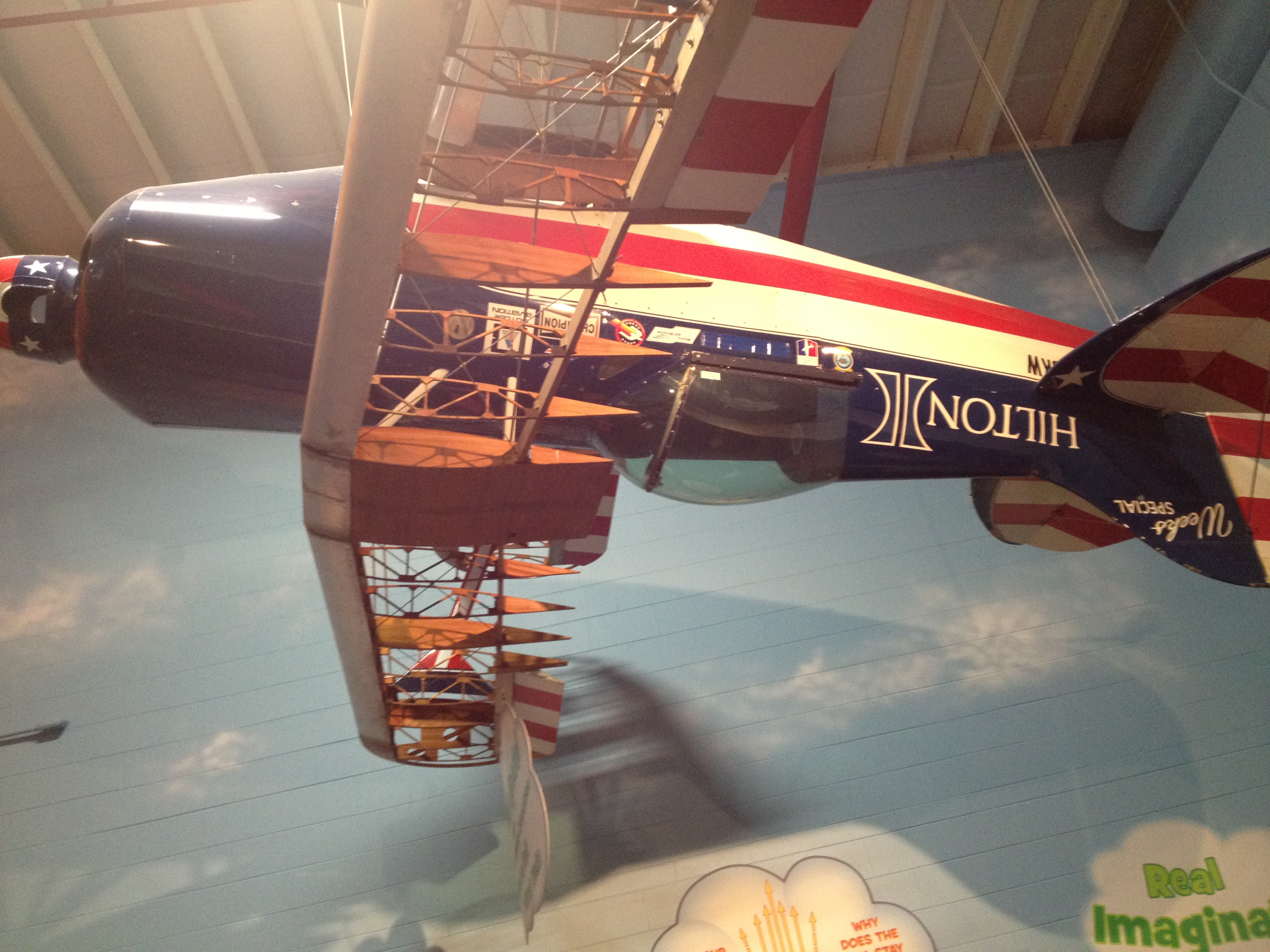
Weeks' first self-designed and built aircraft, the Weeks Special

Kermit Weeks (born July 14, 1953) is an American aviation enthusiast, pilot, and aircraft collector. He has competed in aerobatics, designed aircraft, and promoted aviation and vintage aircraft restoration.

Oil and gas royalties from the Weeks Royalty, derived from his grandfather Lewis George Weeks' work, provide Weeks with the funds, capital, and resources to pursue the preservation of historic aircraft.

== Life and career ==
Weeks and his family moved to Miami, Florida when he was 14, and he began flying model aircraft and competing on the high school gymnastics team. At 17, with only model airplane flying experience, he began building his own home-built Der Jager D-IX (a biplane powered by a four-cylinder Lycoming O-320 engine). During his final year of high school Weeks spent almost all his spare time building his airplane; he finished it in about four years, and test flew it at age 21.

Weeks later learned to fly. He eventually purchased a Pitts S-2A in order to fly in aerobatic competition. In 1973 Weeks began entering aerobatic flying competitions while pursuing an aeronautical engineering degree at Miami-Dade Junior College, the University of Florida, and Purdue University.

By 1977 Weeks had built the "Weeks Special," an aerobatic aircraft of his own design, and qualified for the United States Aerobatics Team. In 1978 he was a runner-up among 61 competitors worldwide, earning three Silver medals and one Bronze medal in the FAI World Aerobatic Championships staged in Czechoslovakia. Over the span of a dozen years, he placed in the top three in the world five times and won a total of 20 medals in World Aerobatics Championship competition. He has twice won the United States National Aerobatics Championship and has won several Invitational Masters Championships in worldwide competitions.

During the late 1970s, Weeks began to acquire, restore, and preserve vintage aircraft. By 1985 he had accumulated enough vintage aircraft to start the Weeks Air Museum in Miami. A non-profit facility, it housed much of his private collection and historic aircraft owned by the museum. Weeks then acquired a 250 acres (100 ha) site near Polk City, Florida, 20 mi (30 km) southwest of Walt Disney World, for an aviation-themed attraction called Fantasy of Flight.

In 1992, as development plans finalized for Fantasy of Flight, Hurricane Andrew struck the Miami area, virtually destroying the Weeks Air Museum facility and seriously damaging most of the vintage aircraft within it. Some of the collection, including a Grumman F4F Wildcat, P-51C Mustang, AT-6 Texan, and a recently repaired Stinson L-1 Vigilant, have been restored and are now displayed and flown at Fantasy of Flight, which opened in 1995.

In 2008 Weeks published a children's book, All of Life Is a School, featuring airplane characters. In 2009 he won a bronze Independent Publisher Book Award for the book. He followed it up with "The Spirit of Lindy" in September 2012.

In 2012 Weeks was awarded the Lloyd P. Nolen Lifetime Achievement in Aviation Award by the Wings Over Houston Airshow. In 2010 he won the Freedom of Flight Award by Bob Hoover. In 2008 Weeks was inducted into the Florida Aviation Hall of Fame, and in 2006 was named a "Living Legend of Aviation."

In 2017 Weeks started producing and selling 'Naked in Jamaica', a Jamaican styled Rum, and retailing blackberries grown at his property in Florida.

== Aircraft collection ==
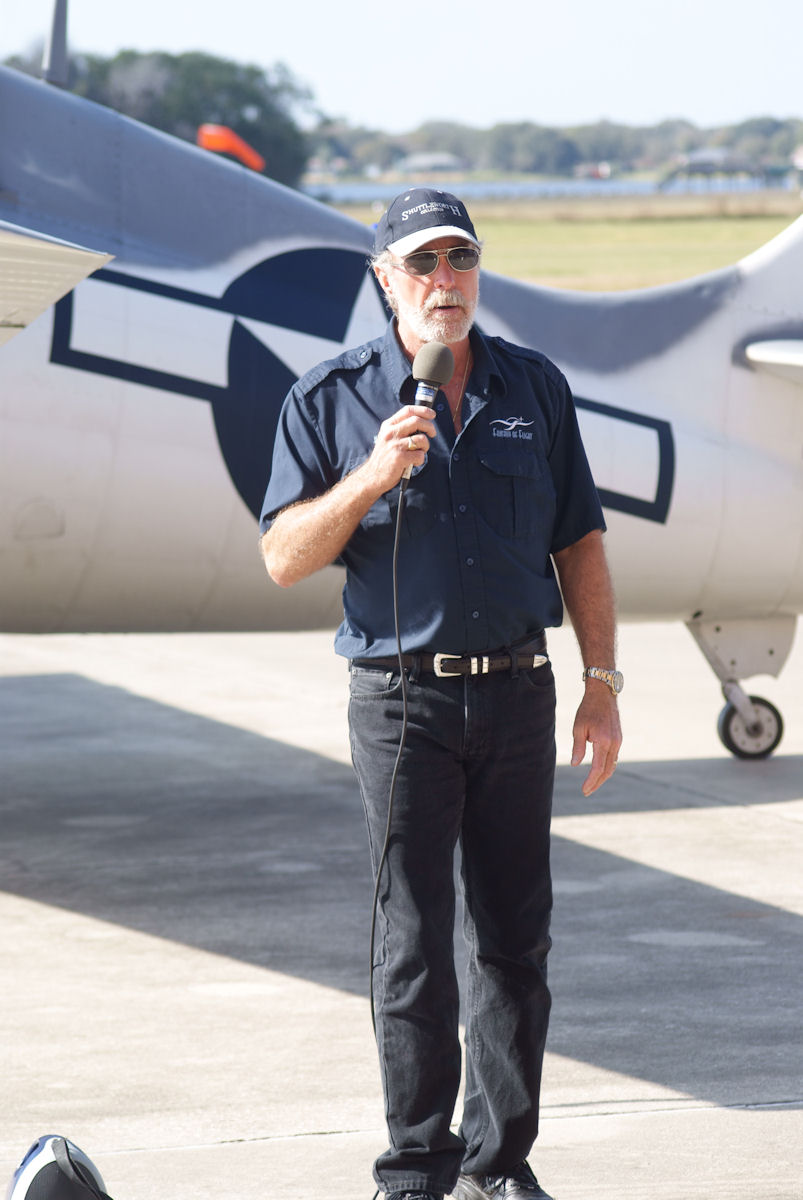
Weeks at Fantasy of Flight in 2013

Weeks maintains one of the largest private collections of flight-worthy historic aircraft in the world, most of which are at his Fantasy of Flight facility in Polk City, Florida. The collection contains over 140 civilian and military planes including rare originals as well as reproductions of historic aircraft, such as the Spirit of St. Louis.

Another replica in Weeks' collection is the Gee Bee Model Z, a racing plane originally built in 1931 and destroyed the same year during a world speed record attempt. It was involved in the opening scene of the 1991 film The Rocketeer.

Weeks owns one of the four remaining original P-51C Mustangs in the world. In addition, Weeks also owns a P-51D Mustang which came later in the war. Both the P-51C and P-51D frequently fly together, most notably during the event dubbed Mustangs and Mustangs which takes place every April where the P-51s and a number of antique Ford Mustangs are exhibited side by side. Weeks is rebuilding an Allison powered Mustang P-51A.

Other original aircraft in the collection include a Short Sunderland flying boat. One of the seven Sunderland aircraft in existence, it is the only one that is reported to be maintained in airworthy condition, as well as the only airworthy 4 engine passenger flying boat. Weeks purchased the Sunderland in England in February 1993 and after a five-month restoration it was flown to the U.S., making stops in Ireland, Iceland, and Canada before arriving at the 1993 EAA AirVenture Oshkosh event. Following the show it was flown to Fantasy of Flight and regularly flew for the following years. However, since 1996 it has remained in the display hangar.

Also on display is one of six existing Martin B-26 Marauder medium bombers from WWII. This aircraft was acquired in the mid-1990s and flown to the museum shortly afterward, and it has remained the only airworthy B-26 since the 1995 crash of the Commemorative Air Force's example that occurred in Midland, Texas. Among the Collection is also a Curtis P-40 Warhawk (TP-40N trainer variant). It is one of only a few airworthy, dual control P-40s. It makes frequent appearances at surrounding air shows and has been featured in the films Death Race and Tora! Tora! Tora!.

Weeks is also known to have owned the largest number of Grumman J2F Duck aircraft since the U.S Navy, having purchased four of the rare aircraft; two have since been sold while one is frequently flown by Weeks, including amphibious water landings. The 4th aircraft is currently under restoration at the museum and Weeks hopes to fly both JF2 Ducks side by side in the near future. A Ford Trimotor, an early civil transport aircraft used by commercial airlines in the 1930s is also part of the collection; it has been used in films including the 1930 TWA promotional film, Coast to Coast in 48 Hours, appearing on screen with Amelia Earhart, and the 1984 adventure film, Indiana Jones and the Temple of Doom, in which the plane is shown being piloted by Harrison Ford as Indiana Jones. Weeks has purchased the Sikorsky S-38 replica, Osa's Ark. This aircraft is the only S-38 that still flies and was featured in the 2004 film, The Aviator.

Most of the aircraft are functional and able to be flown; Weeks has stated that every aircraft in his collection has been flown by him, is being flown currently, or will be flown in the future.

== Personal life ==
Kermit's brother, Chris, was killed in a helicopter crash in the Everglades on January 27, 1979.

In May 2000, Weeks married Teresa Blazina in Sedona, Arizona.

Weeks is spiritual and has described having out-of-body experiences.
