= Fantasy of Flight =

Aviation museum in Polk City, Florida, USA

- The logo for the attraction.

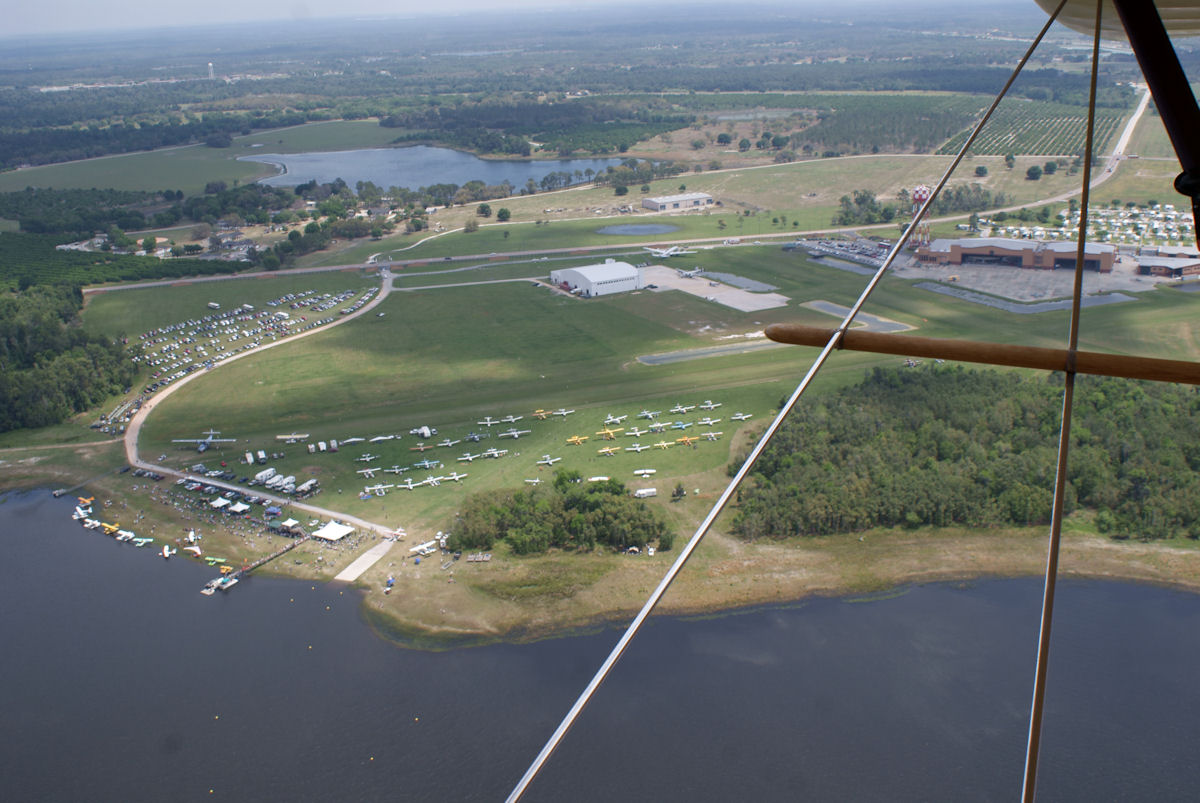

- Location within Florida Location within the United States
- Former name: Weeks Air Museum
- Established: 1981; 45 years ago
- Location: Polk City, Florida
- Coordinates: 28.171192°N 81.808787°W
- Type: Aviation museum
- Founder: Kermit Weeks
- Website: www.fantasyofflight.com

Fantasy of Flight is an aviation museum in Polk City, Florida.

== History ==
=== Establishment ===
The Weeks Air Museum was incorporated in 1981, but only began to grow significantly in 1985 with Kermit Weeks's purchase of 36 aircraft from the Tallmantz Aviation collection. It opened in March 1987 at Tamiami Executive Airport near Kendall, Florida.

=== Move to Polk City ===
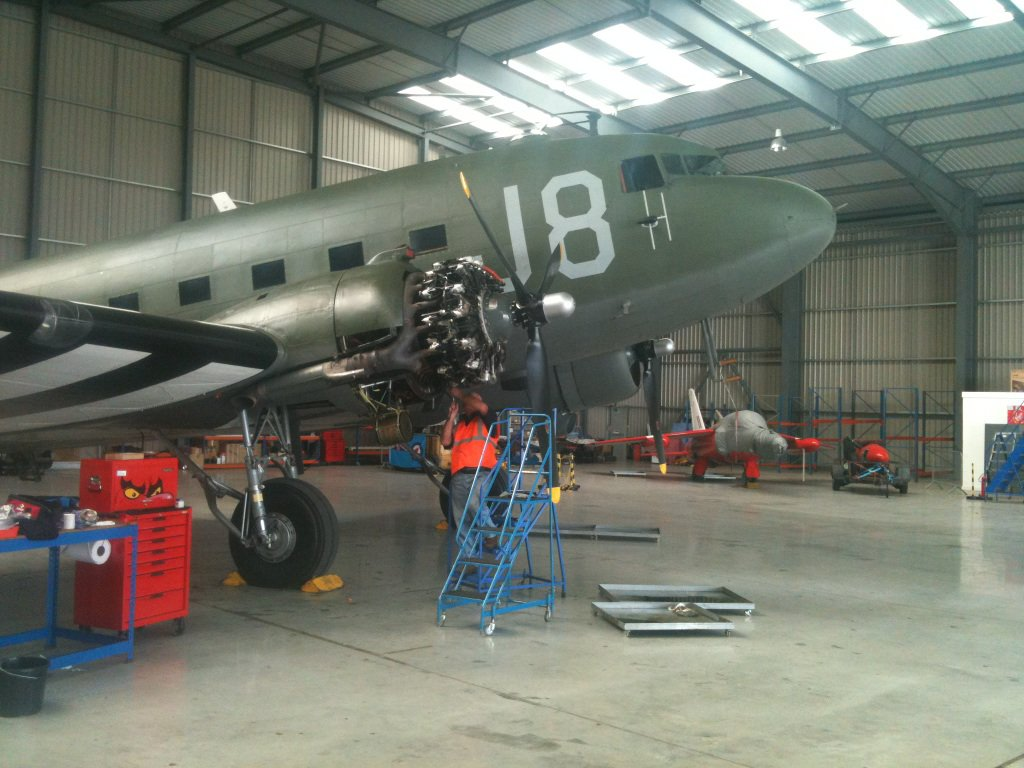
Crews work to solve an oil leak on N1944A prior to departure from England

By mid-1992, plans for a new aviation-themed attraction in Polk City, Florida had been finalized. (Note: Weeks sought a new location that could accommodate seaplanes.) However, that August, the Kendall facility was severely damaged by Hurricane Andrew. The hangar collapsed and many of the aircraft inside and outside were severely damaged. After rebuilding, the museum reopened at the same location in July 1994. This was followed by the opening of the new location, named Fantasy of Flight, on 19 October 1995.

Plans announced in 2005 called for the museum and surrounding area to be developed into a regional tourist attraction called "Orlampa". It would feature themed "villages" focused on different periods of aviation history. However, it suffered from being too far from established theme parks. By the following December, the facility had opened the Orlampa Conference Center.

The last of the aircraft were moved to the new location in May 2009. (Note: The vacant hangar would later be taken over by another aviation museum, Wings Over Miami, circa 2001.)

Starting in February 2011 and running through at least October, the museum held a six part symposium called Legends and Legacies featuring veterans from World War II.

In the summer of 2011, Kermit Weeks and a crew from Fantasy of Flight flew to Cotswold Airport in the United Kingdom to evaluate a Douglas C-47 Skytrain for possible purchase. The aircraft had flown sorties during the D-Day invasion and Operation Market Garden. At the end of July, Weeks went forward with the purchase. Following minor repairs, the plane, registration number N1944A, was flown back to the United States by Weeks and his crew. The aircraft arrived at the EAA AirVenture Museum in August 2011, where it was placed on temporary display. After several months, it was flown to Fantasy of Flight, where it landed on 2 May 2012.

By December 2013, the museum began building a reproduction of a Benoist XIV flying boat to commemorate the hundredth anniversary of the first scheduled commercial airline flight.

=== Partial closing ===
On March 4, 2014, Fantasy of Flight announced that it would close to the public after April 6, 2014, but continue to stage private events. It further announced that it would reopen to the public in late 2014 as a scaled-down museum, with reduced admission prices, while it simultaneously begin to design and build the main facility into more of a destination attraction that would appeal to a wider audience rather than just aviation aficionados. To accomplish this, it had been talking with a former senior vice president of Universal Resorts Worldwide since 2013. Following the announcement, the museum experienced an increased number of visitors.

On January 30, 2015, it opened an exhibition with a small selection of aircraft while the facility is upgraded for a future reopening.

By mid-2020 the facility was struggling to attract visitors.

As it was in need of restoration, the museum took down the DC-3 that had been mounted next to I-4 in 2024.

The museum broke ground on a new hangar on 6 November 2025.

== Facility ==
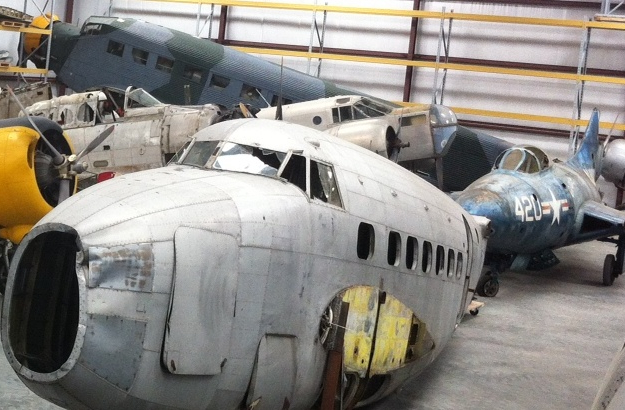
General view of Golden Hill Building 1 opened to the public in the summer of 2012

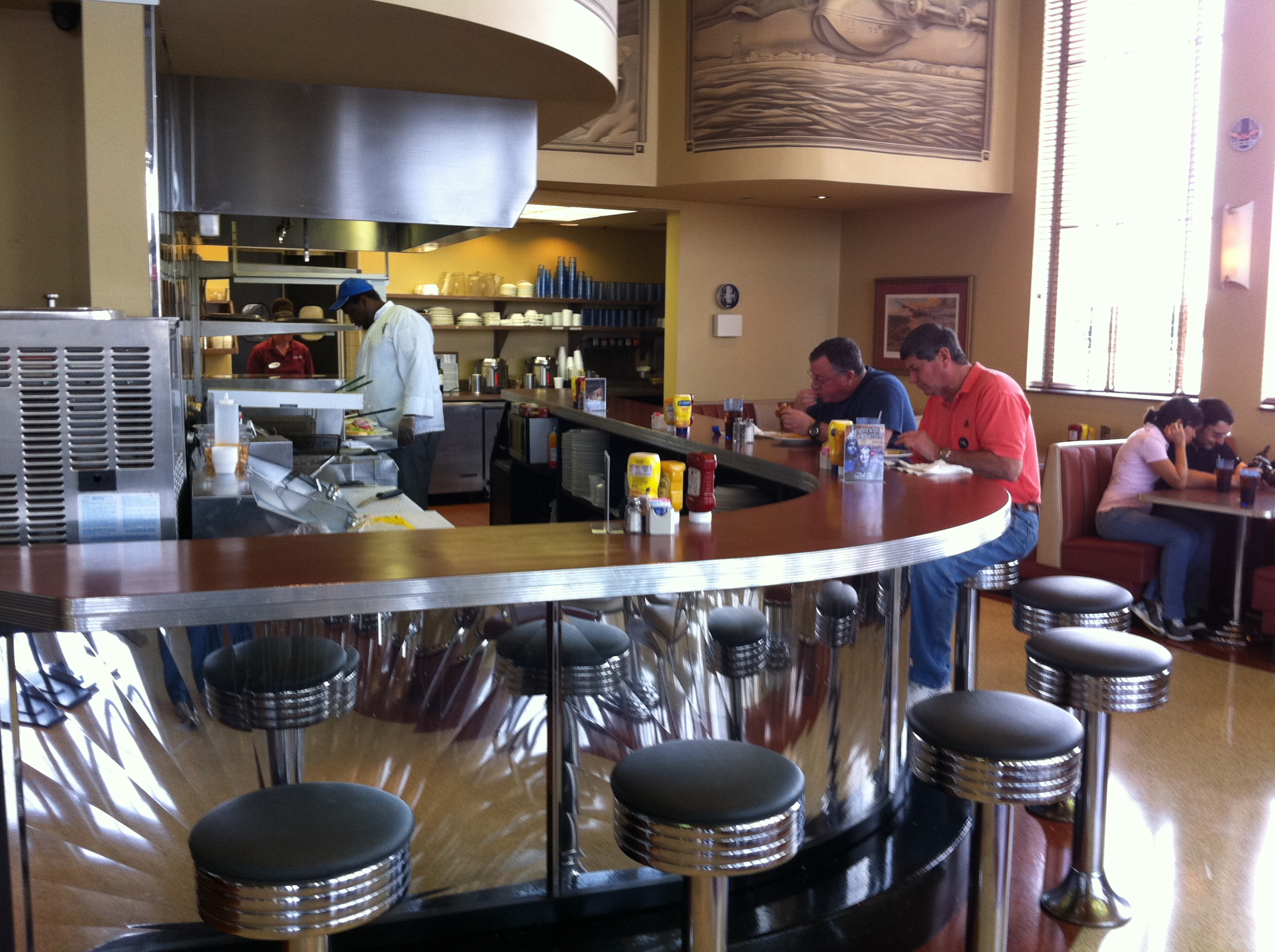
Patrons at the Compass Rose

The facility's main buildings consist of the two large "North" and "South" hangars – a combined 42,000 sq ft (3,900 m^{2}) – where aircraft are displayed, the restoration shops, an immersion environment, the gift shop, and the Compass Rose, an Art Deco diner. Across from the entrance are a ropes course and zip line amusements.

Adjoining the hangars there is a tarmac and two grass runways. On the north side of the runways are a maintenance hangar and conference facility. A "back lot" to the south of the main complex contains warehouses and storage and additional restoration facilities. Storage facilities located across Broadway Blvd are accessible to the public via a guided tour. The adjacent Lake Agnes permits seaplane operations, with a designated landing/takeoff area on 18/36 and a ramp to the taxiway.

=== Golden Hill Storage Facility ===
For years Fantasy of Flight has maintained a storage building opposite the main property on the north side of Broadway Boulevard where aircraft awaiting restoration were stored. In late 2011, work began on a second building to double the storage space with the intention of spreading out the stored items a bit and opening the buildings to the public on a limited basis. Finally, in June 2011 preparations were sufficient to open one building for a special preview over the Father's Day holiday. The response to the limited, self-guided experience was positive, and the building joined the attraction's public programming in the summer of 2012, with the second building scheduled to open shortly thereafter.

The buildings are known by Fantasy of Flight as the "Golden Hill" facility as a tongue in cheek reference to the Paul E. Garber Preservation, Restoration, and Storage Facility of the National Air and Space Museum which is nicknamed "Silver Hill" by the NASM staff. The museum offers tours of the facility, which is accessible via over-the-road trolley operated from the main parking lot in the mornings. The facility closes at midday due to the lack of air conditioning in the steel buildings which can get hot in the Florida sun.

=== Compass Rose Diner ===
Adjacent to the attraction's lobby is an Art Deco themed restaurant called "The Compass Rose Diner" which features the characteristics of diners associated with airports during the 1930s and early 1940s. The restaurant features tall windows, multi-hued terrazzo floors, and the curved architectural lines associated with the Art Deco period. The diner was open to the public and served a short-order menu similar to that of lunch counters popularized during the pre-World War II era. When the main facility was closed to the public in 2014, the diner was closed and much of its equipment sold off, though the space itself is still available as part of the venue's rental offerings.

=== Airport ===
Orlampa Inc Airport
- IATA: none; ICAO: none; FAA LID: FA08

Summary
- Elevation AMSL: 139 ft (42 m)

Map
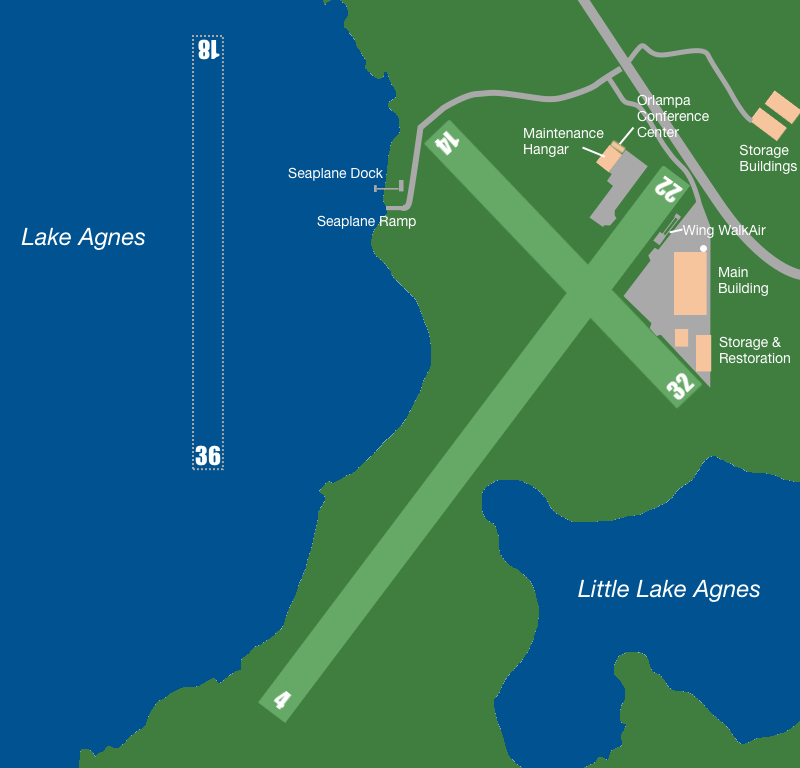
- General layout

Runways
Direction	Length		Surface
Direction	ft	m	Surface
4/22	5,090	1,551	turf
14/32	2,500	762	turf
- Source: AirNav

The airfield is officially known as the "Orlampa Inc. Airport" and uses the airport identifier "FA08." The field sits at an estimated elevation of 129 feet (39 meters). It is designated as private use only and special permission is needed to land there. The field is generally closed to all non-company traffic. The airfield consists of two turf runways: runway 4/22 (5,090 ft × 125 ft / 1,551 m × 38 m) and runway 14/32 (2,500 ft × 100 ft / 762 m × 30 m). The airfield appears as "Orlampa" on the Jacksonville sectional chart. The name "Orlampa" was originated by Kermit Weeks based on the airfield being approximately midway between the cities of Orlando and Tampa.

== Exhibits ==
=== Immersion environments ===
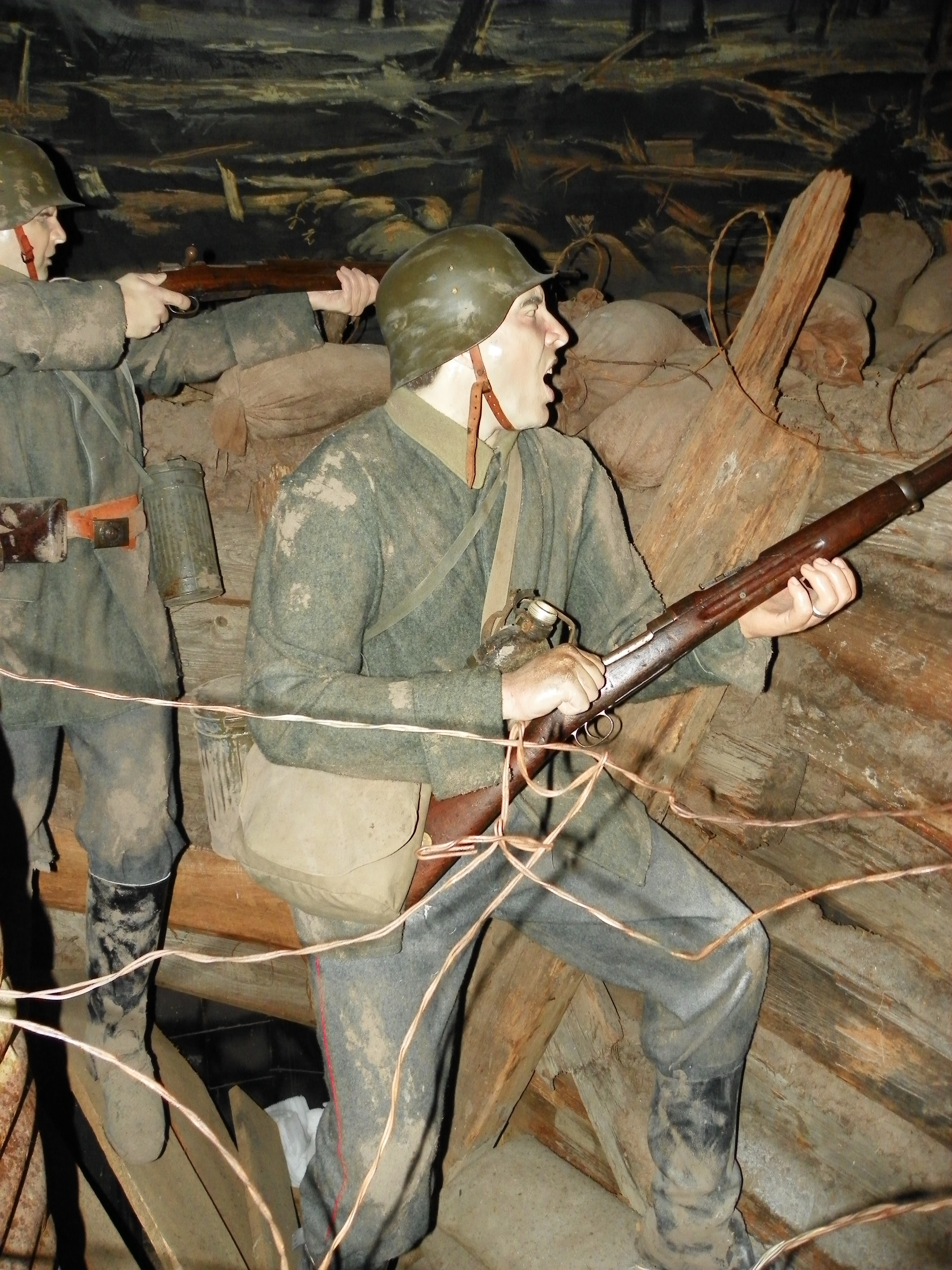
WWI Immersion Experience

The immersion environments are part of the main facility now closed to the public, but are available as part of the facilities which can be rented for events. Visitors walk through several immersion environments as they enter the attraction. From the lobby, guests walk into the interior of a World War II-era Douglas C-47 Skytrain complete with lighting and sound effects as if the aircraft were conducting paratrooper operations. Guests pass a seated paratrooper in full kit and move forward toward the Jumpmaster figure standing at the open side hatch. Over the hatch blinks a red "Ready" light which switches to a green "Jump" light as the guest approaches the hatch. Through the hatch is the entry to the attraction.

Other immersion environments include a "sensation of flight" simulator, followed by a celebration of the early days of flight. Then, a passage covered by heavy shrapnel-resistant curtains leads visitors into a full-scale representation of the trench warfare of World War I, complete with aircraft overhead.

The final immersion display includes the collection's Boeing B-17 Flying Fortress housed in a large darkened room staged to appear as a winter evening at RAF Horham, home of the 95th Bombardment Group (Heavy) during World War II. The full-scale diorama, complete with ground vehicles, outbuildings, and landscaping, represents a maintenance area and one of the B-17's engine cowlings and propellers are removed to maintenance stands in front of the aircraft. Guests can enter the plane via the aft side hatch in the tail, walk through the bomb bay, visit the cockpit, and exit near the nose of the aircraft.

=== Douglas DC-3 attraction sign ===
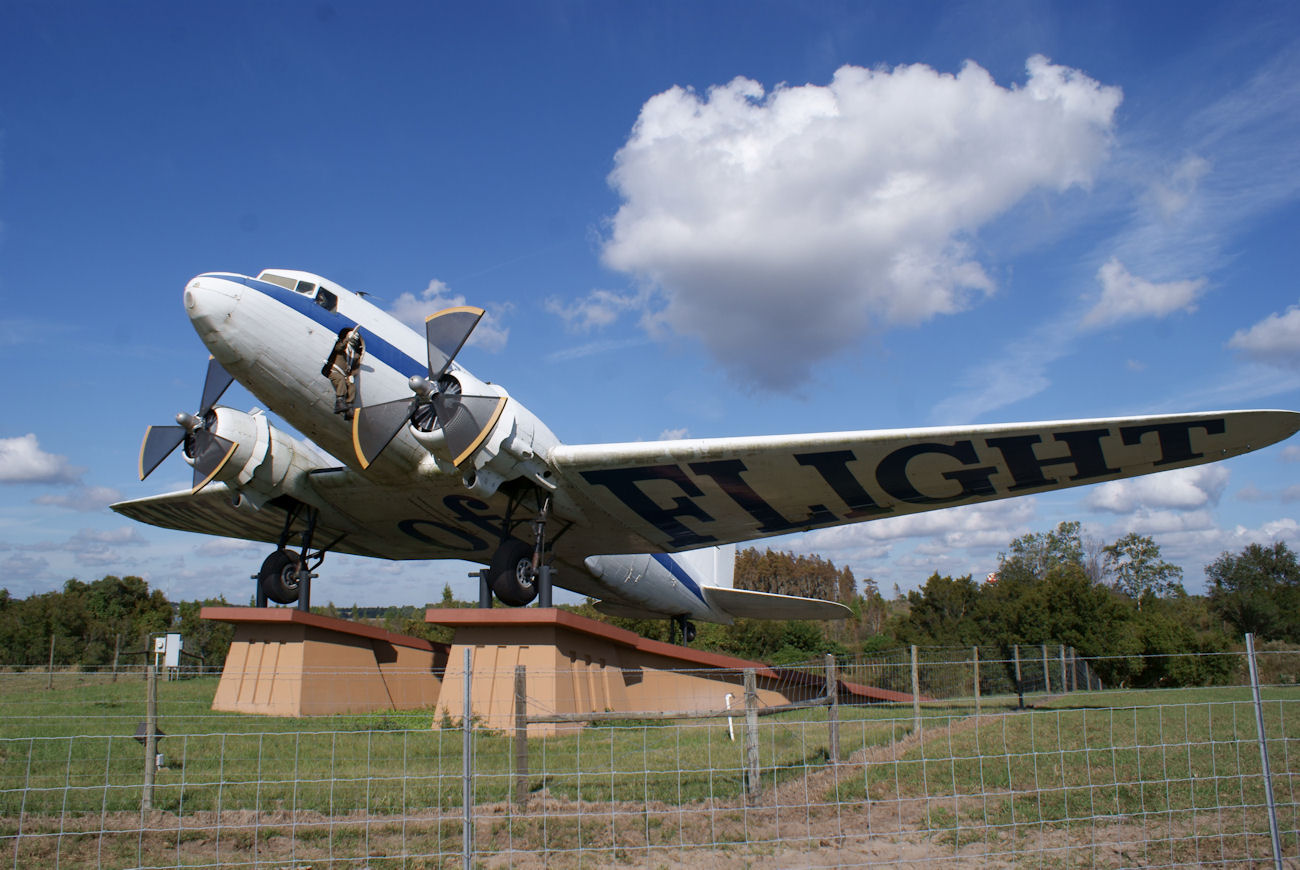
DC-3 attraction sign

Standing along the side of Interstate 4 near the exit for Fantasy of Flight is a Douglas DC-3 painted with the attraction's name to get the attention of passers by. The aircraft itself is not part of the collection and was, in fact, specifically purchased for its intended purpose as an attraction sign. The airframe is far too corroded to make restoration of the DC-3 feasible. The aircraft was displayed for a period of time in a 'crashed' position, nose down in the ground with a mannequin hanging from the tail wheel, apparently a 'man' evacuating the aircraft with a parachute. The mannequin was dressed up for certain occasions around the year, including Santa Claus for Christmas; Uncle Sam for Independence Day; and a Pilgrim for Thanksgiving.

The aircraft in this crashed position received a mixture of criticism and compliments. Some people claimed that the display made the aircraft look bad and set a bad example to airline passengers without an aviation background, while others found the position of the aircraft comical and many enjoyed guessing what the mannequin would be dressed as next. The aircraft was in an upright position with the mannequin seated in the opened cockpit hatch on the left hand side until 2018, when the mannequin was stolen. In 2024, the plane was removed.

== Collection ==
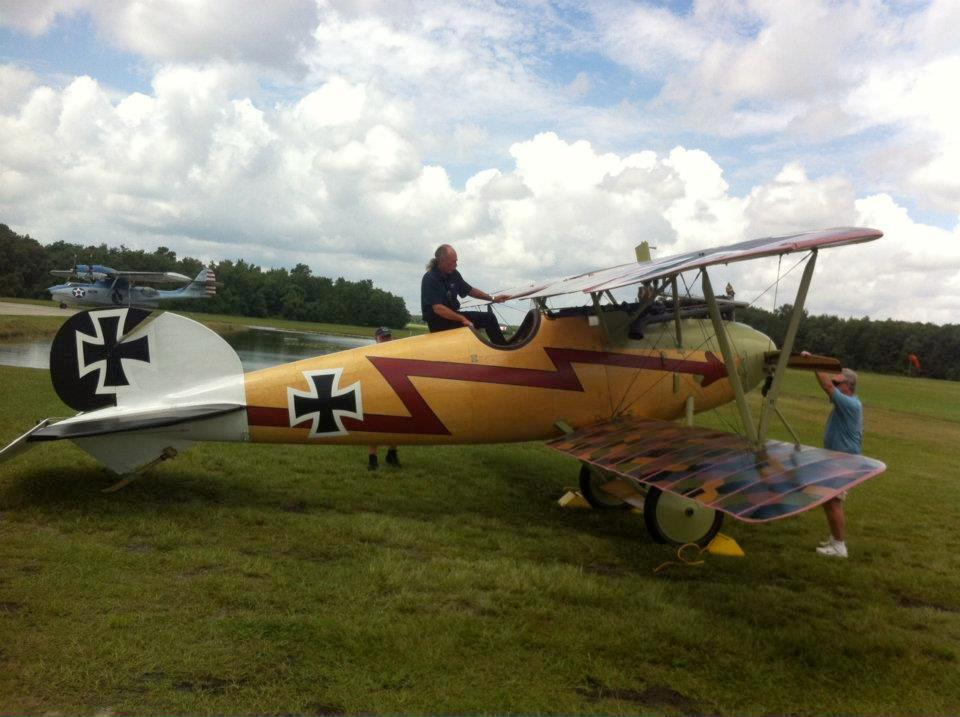
Kermit Weeks boards the museum's Albatros D.Va for its first flight

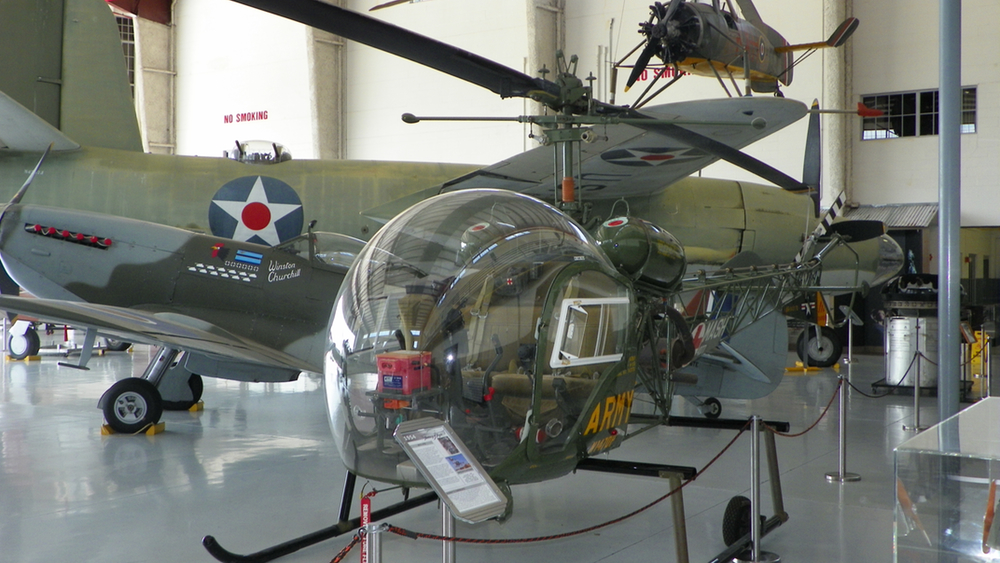
The museum's Bell 47G displayed in the foreground, Supermarine Spitfire Mk.16 behind, Cierva C.30A autogyro in the upper right and B-26 in the background

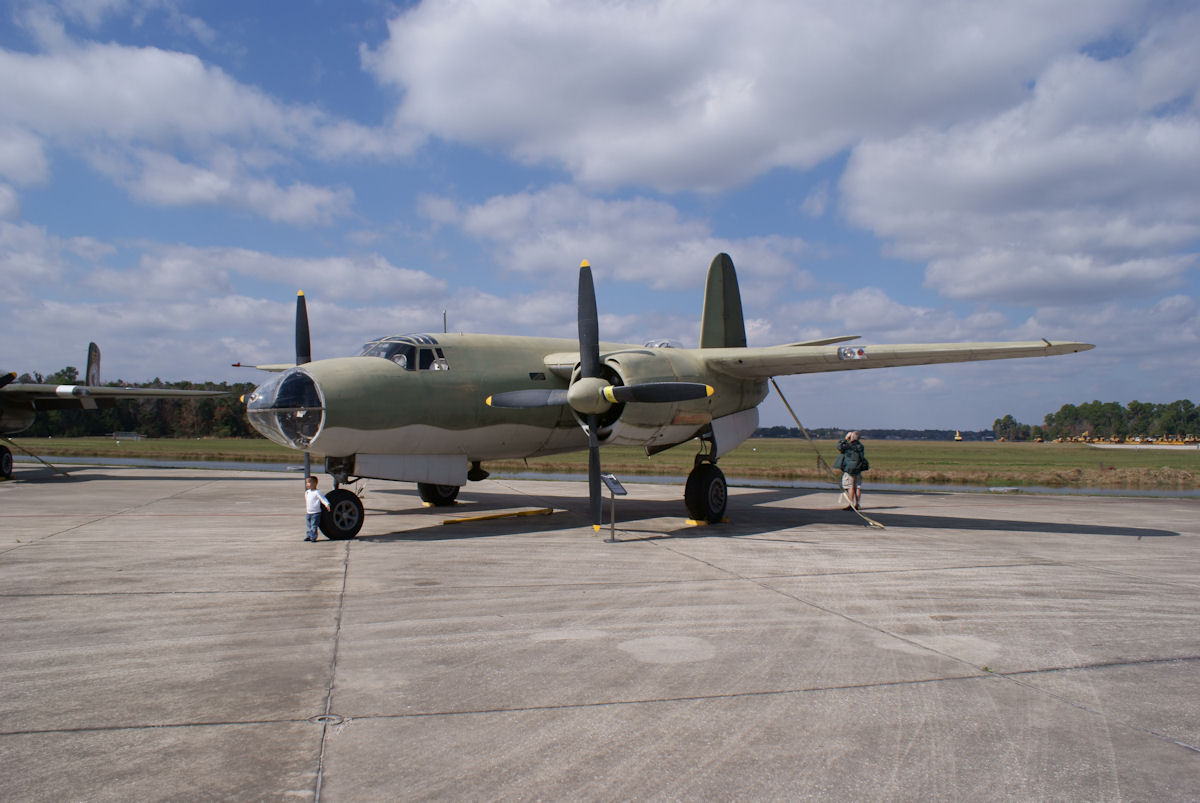
The museum's Martin B-26 Marauder

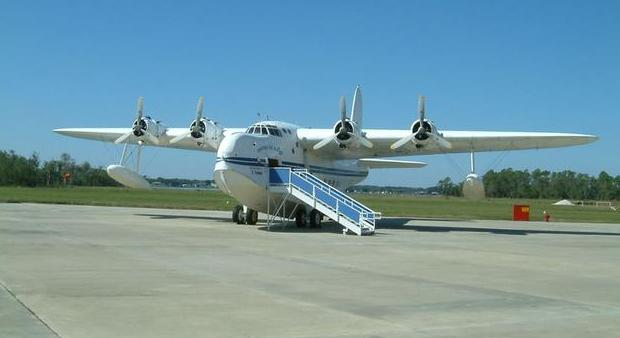
The museum's Short Sandringham

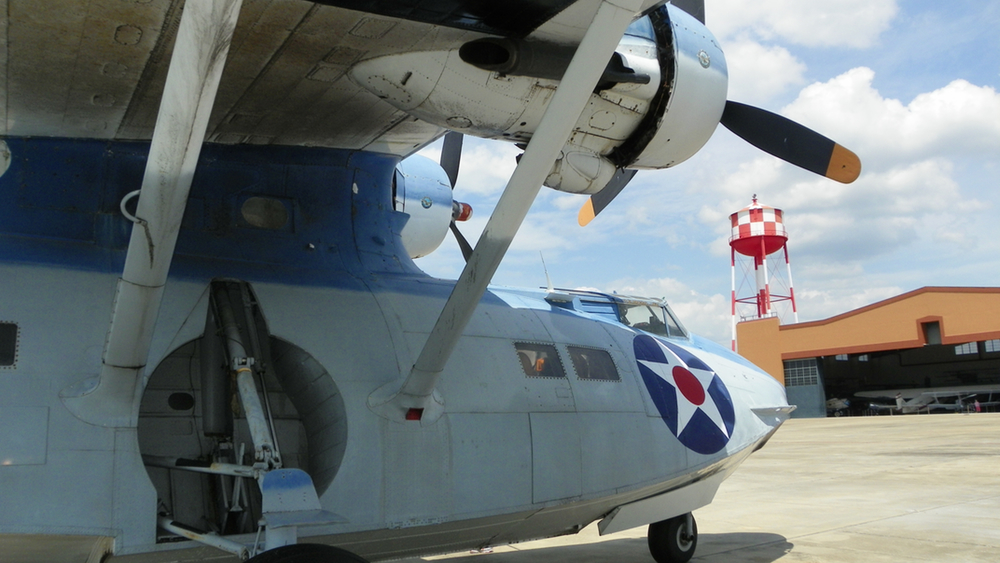
The museum's Consolidated PBY Catalina with the main building and North Hangar in the background

- Airco DH-4B
- Airco DH-4BM
- Albatros D.Va – reproduction
- Antonov An-2
- Antonov An-2
- Avro Cadet
- Avro Lancaster Mk. 10AR KB976 – stored
- Bachem Ba 349 Natter – reproduction
- Barber Valkyrie – reproduction
- Beechcraft AT-11 Kansan
- Beechcraft Model 17 Staggerwing N52962 – displayed at the Florida Air Museum at Lakeland Linder International Airport.
- Beechcraft SNB-1
- Bell 47G
- Bell P-39K Airacobra – under restoration offsite
- Bell RP-63C Kingcobra
- Benoist XIV – reproduction
- Boeing 100 – under restoration offsite
- Boeing B-17G Flying Fortress 44-83542
- Boeing B-17G Flying Fortress 44-83525 "Suzy Q" – stored
- Boeing P2B-1S Superfortress BuNo 84029 "Fertile Myrtle"
- Brown B-2 Racer – reproduction
- Bücker Bü 131 Jungmann
- Bücker Bü 133 Jungmeister
- Bücker Bü 181 Bestmann
- CAC CA-13 Boomerang – stored
- CAC CA-13 Boomerang – stored
- CAC CA-16 Wirraway
- CASA 352L
- Cierva C.30A
- Columbia J2F-6 Duck – stored
- Consolidated B-24J Liberator "Joe"
- Consolidated PBY-5A Catalina
- Consolidated PBY Catalina – stored
- Curtiss JN-4D N2404
- Curtiss Headless Pusher – reproduction
- Curtiss TP-40N Warhawk
- Curtiss Robin NC8313
- Curtiss-Wright CW-19
- Curtiss-Wright CW-22
- Curtiss-Wright Junior N10967
- de Havilland Mosquito B.35 RS712 – on long-term loan at EAA AirVenture Museum in Oshkosh, Wisconsin.
- de Havilland Vampire FB.6 – stored
- Douglas A-24B Banshee 42-54643 – stored
- Douglas RB-26C Invader
- Douglas B-23 Dragon – stored
- Douglas C-47 Skytrain
- Douglas DC-3 – Used for advertising alongside the Interstate 4.
- EKW C-36 – stored
- EKW C-36 – stored
- Fairey Swordfish Mk IV – stored
- Focke-Wulf Fw 44 Stieglitz
- Fokker D.VII – reproduction, under construction offsite
- Fokker D.VIII – reproduction
- Fokker Dr.I – reproduction
- Ford 5-AT Trimotor N9651 – The "City of Philadelphia"
- General Motors FM-2 Wildcat
- General Motors TBM-3E Avenger
- Gloster Meteor Mk IV – stored
- Goodyear FG-1D Corsair
- Granville Gee Bee Model R-2 Super Sportster – reproduction
- Granville Gee Bee Model Y Senior Sportster – reproduction
- Granville Gee Bee Model Z Super Sportster – reproduction
- Grumman F3F-2
- Grumman F6F-3 Hellcat – stored
- Grumman F7F-3 Tigercat – stored
- Grumman F9F-2B Panther – stored
- Grumman G-44 Widgeon – displayed at Florida Air Museum at Lakeland Linder International Airport.
- Grumman J2F Duck
- Hawker Sea Fury FB.11
- Hawker Tempest II – under restoration
- Hawker Tempest V EJ693 – under restoration
- Herring-Curtiss Pusher
- Hiller Hornet
- Howard DGA-5 – reproduction
- Kawasaki Ki-61 Hien – stored
- Laird Super Solution – reproduction
- Lavochkin La-11 – stored
- Lindstrand 105A N69FF
- Lockheed L-1649A Starliner N974R
- Lockheed P-38L Lightning 44-26761 – stored
- Lockheed Vega 5A/5C NC105W – under restoration offsite
- Martin 4-0-4 N40415 – stored outside
- Martin B-26 Marauder
- Messerschmitt Bf 108 – under restoration
- Messerschmitt Bf 109 – under restoration offsite
- Mitsubishi A6M5 Zero – stored
- Morane-Saulnier AI
- Morane/Brock Monoplane
- Morane-Saulnier MS.500
- Nieuport 17 – reproduction
- Nord SV.4
- North American AT-6D Texan
- North American B-25J Mitchell
- North American P-51A Mustang – stored
- North American P-51C Mustang N1204
- North American P-51D Mustang N921
- Piper L-4J Grasshopper
- Pitcairn PA-18
- Polikarpov I-16
- Polikarpov Po-2
- Republic P-47D Thunderbolt
- Ryan NYP N211NX – reproduction
- Santos-Dumont Demoiselle
- Savoia-Marchetti S.56
- Seversky P-35A – under restoration
- Shenyang J-2 – stored
- Short Sandringham
- Sikorsky S-38 – under restoration offsite
- Sikorsky S-39 NC50V – "Spirit of Igor"
- Sikorsky S-43
- Sikorsky S-55
- Sopwith 7F.1 Snipe – reproduction
- Sopwith Pup – reproduction
- Sopwith Pup – reproduction
- Spirit of Peace – Capsule displayed at the Florida Air Museum
- Standard E-1
- Standard J-1
- Stinson Airliner NC11170
- Stinson L-1 Vigilant
- Supermarine Spitfire Mk XIV MV262 – stored
- Supermarine Spitfire Mk XVI N476TE
- Thomas-Morse Scout
- Travel Air 4000 NC174V
- Tupolev Tu-2S – stored
- Tupolev Tu-2S – stored
- Tupolev Tu-2S – stored
- UTVA Aero 3
- V-1 flying bomb – reproduction
- Vought F4U-4 Corsair
- Vought OS2U Kingfisher – under restoration offsite
- Vultee BT-15 – under restoration
- Westland Lysander
- Weeks S1-WS Solution N300KW – aerobatic aircraft designed and built by Kermit Weeks, stored.
- Weeks S-1W Special N69KW
- White WW-1 Der Jäger D.IX N30KW

== Events ==
Starting in 1995, the museum held an annual Wings & Strings Music Festival. Starting in 2007 it also held an annual event called Roar n' Soar.

== Programs ==
Waldo Wright's Flying Service formerly offered airplane rides for sale from the Fantasy of Flight field during parts of the year and operated a Boeing PT-17 Stearman and a New Standard D-25. The Stearman was used for 30 minute long 'hands-on experience' flights, in which the customer took control of the aircraft at some point during the flight. The D-25 was used for 15 minute barnstorming flights, in which up to four customers sat in the forward open cockpit of the aircraft as a qualified pilot flies the aircraft.

== See also ==
- List of aviation museums
