= Miami Executive Airport =

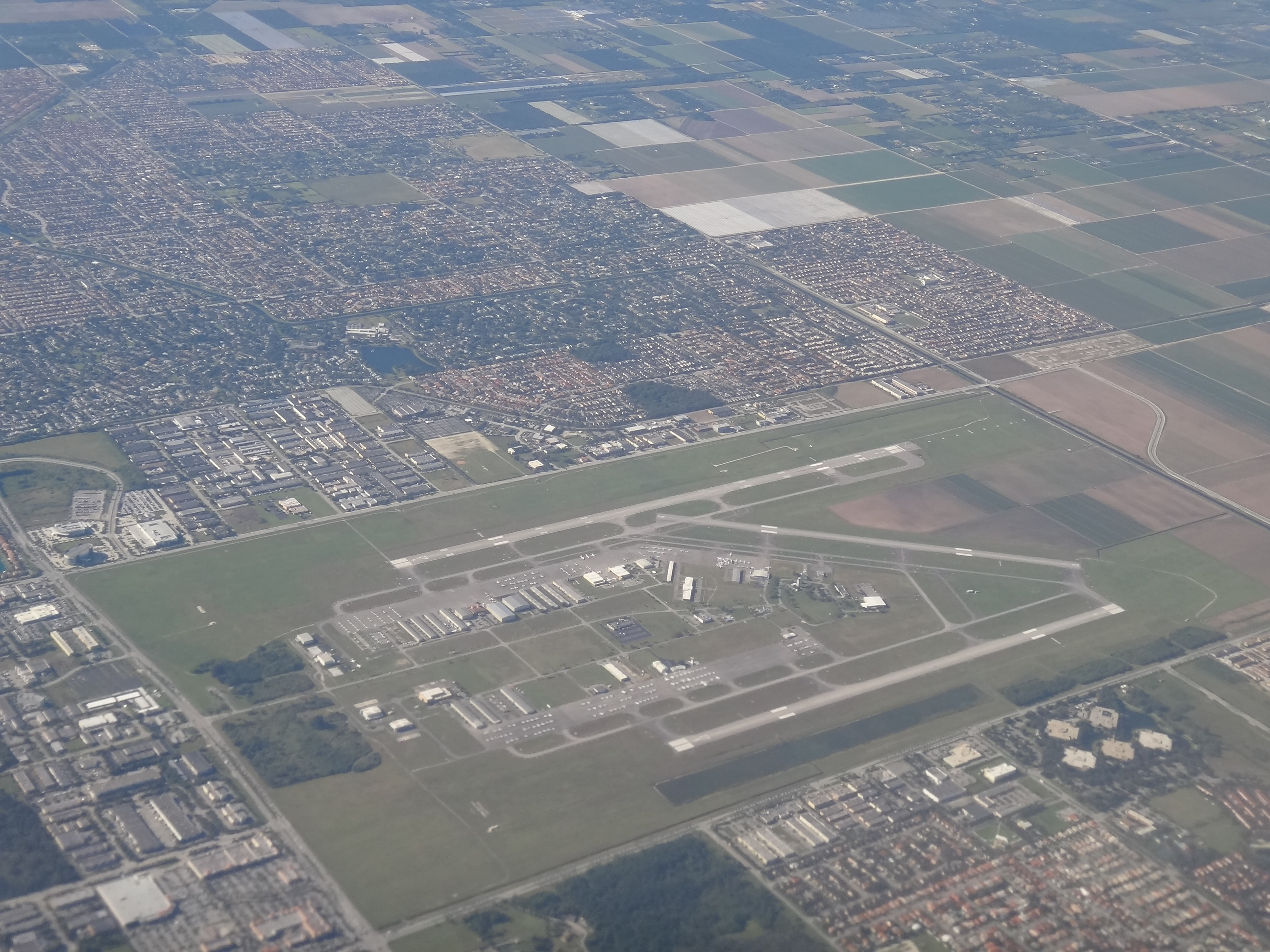
- Aerial view of Miami Executive Airport
- IATA: TMB; ICAO: KTMB; FAA LID: TMB

Summary
- Airport type: Public
- Owner: Miami-Dade County
- Operator: Miami-Dade Aviation Department (MDAD)
- Serves: Miami, Florida
- Location: Miami-Dade County, Florida
- Elevation AMSL: 10 ft (3.0 m)
- Coordinates: 25°38′52″N 080°25′58″W
- Website: www.miami-airport.com/...

Map
- Interactive map of Miami Executive Airport

Runways
Direction	Length		Surface
Direction	ft	m	Surface
9L/27R	5,003	1,525	Asphalt
9R/27L	6,000	1,829	Asphalt
13/31	4,001	1,220	Asphalt

Statistics (2023)
- Aircraft operations: 272,797
- Based aircraft: 135
- Source: Federal Aviation Administration

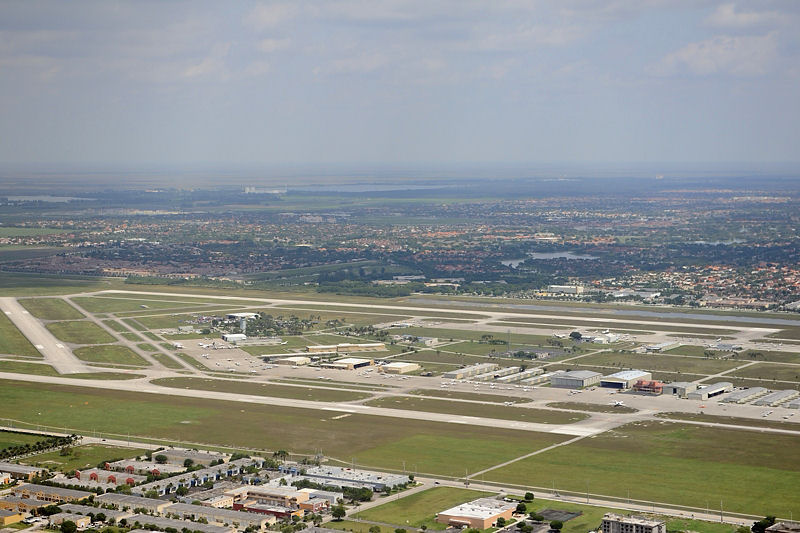
Miami Executive Airport

Miami Executive Airport, formerly known until 2014 as Kendall-Tamiami Executive Airport, (IATA: TMB, ICAO: KTMB, FAA LID: TMB) is a public airport in unincorporated Miami-Dade County, Florida, 15 miles (24 km) southwest of Downtown Miami. Operated by the Miami-Dade Aviation Department, the airport is one of Florida's busiest general aviation facilities. It supports corporate, recreational, flight training, and government aviation operations.

Miami Executive Airport airport opened on November 18, 1967, replacing the original Tamiami Airport, which was located near the Tamiami Trail. The relocation was prompted by the growth of the surrounding area and the proximity to the flight path to Miami International Airport, which necessitated the move to the southwest, near the community of Kendall. The site of the former Tamiami Airport is now home to Florida International University. 450 aircraft are based there, mostly single-engine light aircraft.

The airport serves as a port of entry, with U.S. Customs personnel available. Although not certified for airline use, Miami Executive Airport has become a hub for corporate aviation in recent years.

== History ==
The airport opened in 1967, replacing an eponymous airfield to the north which closed due to its proximity to Miami International Airport. When built, the airport also had a seaplane runway which is still visible on the north side of the airfield. The airport was renamed from Kendall-Tamiami Executive Airport to Miami Executive Airport on October 7, 2014, by the Miami-Dade County Commission. All secondary airports in Miami-Dade County were rebranded to include the name "Miami."

In 2025, private jet operator flyExclusive announced plans to launch luxury commuter services out of Miami Executive Airport to destinations around South Florida, the Bahamas, and the Caribbean. The operator used Cessna Caravans on the routes.

In 2026, the airport was named as a potential site for local aviation leaders to expand as a reliever to the Miami International Airport. While MIA is nearing capacity, studies have found it is time to start developing new commercial aviation options so that projects are complete by the time MIA is at capacity.

== Facilities and aircraft ==
=== Facilities ===
The airport covers 1,380 acres (558 ha) and has three asphalt runways:

- 9L/27R: 5,003 x 150 ft (1,525 x 46 m)
- 9R/27L: 6,000 x 150 ft (1,829 x 46 m)
- 13/31: 4,001 x 150 ft (1,220 x 46 m)

==== Runway 9R/27L extension ====
A request for $1-million was added to the 2007 Miami-Dade Federal Legislative Package to extend runway 9R/27L 550 feet to the east and 1,798 feet to the west to "...allow aircraft to increase their fuel and/or cargo load and ... allow for the accommodation of nearly 100 percent of midsize jet aircraft under wet runway conditions."

=== Aircraft ===
In the year ending 3 May 2018, the airport had 194,111 aircraft operations, average 531 per day: 99% general aviation, 1% air taxi and <1% military. 135 aircraft were based at the airport: 104 single-engine and 17 multi-engine airplanes, 6 helicopters, 5 jets, and 3 gliders.

== Services ==
The airport serves as the primary airbase for the Miami-Dade Police Aviation Unit and is also home to the Miami-Dade College's aviation programs. Additionally The Wings Over Miami aviation museum is located at the airport.

It is the base for the Tamiami Composite Squadron (SER-FL-355), a local unit of the Civil Air Patrol(United States Air Force Auxiliary), which is tasked with aerial and ground search and rescue missions.

Fire protection at the airport is provided by station 24 of the Miami-Dade Fire Rescue Department

== Ohio University all-season test facility ==
Ohio University Avionics Engineering Center operates a controversial avionics test facility on Runway 9L, the north runway at Miami Executive Airport. This facility was used in 2007–8 to certify the steep approach landing system on the Embraer ERJ-170 and ERJ-190 transport category jet airliners. Embraer conducted this testing and software development in order to meet stringent requirements and approval to land at London City Airport, an airport in central London, England. The test facility was under intense scrutiny due to numerous controversial test flights involving the challenging development and modifications to the fly-by-wire flight control systems in these advanced aircraft.

Testing of experimental aircraft over congested areas such as Kendall is prohibited by the FAA. Media coverage in the Miami Herald and Kendall Gazette about the safety issues led the Kendall Federation of Homeowners Associations to call for a meeting to discuss the problem.

== Incidents and accidents ==
- On November 29, 1978, a Convair CV-240 crashed when the trainee pilot lost control during a simulated engine failure at V2 speed during takeoff. The aircraft touched down left of the runway and wound up in a canal, catching fire and killing one of the two people on board.
- On February 11, 2015, a Beechcraft 1900C operated by Aeropanamericano, C.A., experienced an engine failure after takeoff from Miami Executive Airport and attempted to return but crashed, killing all four people on board.

== See also ==
- List of airports in Florida
