= Barnstorming =

Aircraft pilots performing stunts to entertain

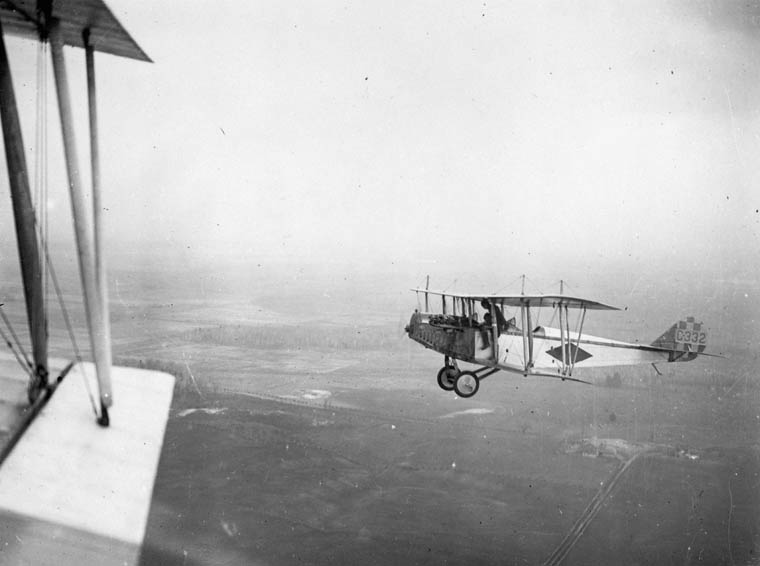
A Curtiss JN-4 "Jenny" over central Ontario, Canada, c. 1918

Barnstorming was a form of entertainment in which stunt pilots performed tricks individually or in groups that were called flying circuses. Devised to "impress people with the skill of pilots and the sturdiness of planes", it became popular in the United States during the Roaring Twenties.

Barnstormers were pilots who flew throughout the country to sell airplane rides and perform stunts. Charles Lindbergh first began flying as a barnstormer. Barnstorming was the first major form of civil aviation in the history of manned flight.

== History ==
=== Background ===
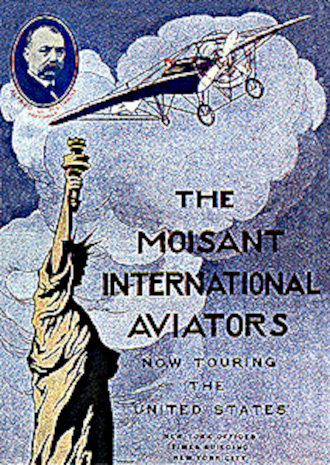
An advertising poster for the early flying exhibition team, the Moisant International Aviators

The Wright brothers and Glenn Curtiss had early flying exhibition teams, with solo flyers like Lincoln Beachey and Didier Masson also popular before World War I, but barnstorming did not become a formal phenomenon until the 1920s. The first barnstormer, taught to fly by Curtiss in 1909, was one Charles Foster Willard, who is also credited as the first to be shot down in an airplane when an annoyed farmer fired a squirrel gun and broke his propeller.

During World War I, the United States manufactured a significant number of Curtiss JN-4 "Jenny" biplanes to train its military aviators, and almost every American airman learned to fly using the plane. After the war the U.S. federal government sold off the surplus material, including the Jennys, for a fraction of their initial value (they had cost the government $5,000 each, but were being sold for as low as $200). This allowed many servicemen who already knew how to fly the JN-4s to purchase their own planes. The similar-looking Standard J-1 biplane was also available.

At the same time, numerous aircraft manufacturing companies sprang up, most failing after building only a handful of planes. Many of these were reliable and even advanced designs which suffered from the failure of the aviation market to expand as expected, and a number of these found their way into the only active markets—mail carrying, barnstorming, and smuggling. Sometimes a plane and its owner would drift between the three activities as opportunity presented.

Combined with the lack of Federal Aviation Regulations at the time, these factors allowed barnstorming to flourish.

=== Growth and heyday ===
==== Flying circuses ====
Although barnstormers often worked alone or in very small teams, some also organized large "flying circuses" with multiple planes and stunt people. These acts employed promoters to book shows in towns ahead of time. They were the largest and most organized of all of the barnstorming acts. Well-known circuses included the Five Blackbirds (an African American flying group), the Flying Aces Air Circus, the 13 Black Cats, Mabel Cody’s Flying Circus, the Inman Brothers Flying Circus, and the Marie Meyer Flying Circus. Perhaps the largest and most successful of these was the Gates Flying Circus, which attracted in its heyday tens of thousands to a single show. A Time magazine article estimated it staged 2000 air meets in 44 states.

==== Women and minorities ====
Barnstorming was performed not only by former military men, but also by women, minorities, and minority women. For example, on July 18, 1915, Katherine Stinson became the first woman in the world to perform a loop. Bessie Coleman, an African-American woman, "not only thrilled audiences with her skills as a barnstormer, but she also became a role model for women and African Americans. Her very presence in the air threatened prevailing contemporary stereotypes. She also fought segregation when she could by using her influence as a celebrity."

=== Charles Lindbergh, before his fame ===
Charles Lindbergh engaged in barnstorming in his early years, with the Marie Meyer Flying Circus and others, making a marginal living; Errold Bahl hired him as an assistant, and as a promotional stunt, Lindbergh "volunteered to climb out onto the wing and wave to the crowds below", a performance known as "wing walking". During a barnstorming tour in Minnesota and Wisconsin in 1923, he made the "decision to pursue further formal instruction with the U.S. Army Air Service".

=== Regulation and decline ===
The sensational journalism and economic prosperity that marked the Jazz Age in the United States allowed barnstormers to publicize aviation and eventually contributed to bringing about regulation and control. In 1925, the U.S. government began regulating aviation, when it passed the Contract Air Mail Act, which allowed the U.S. Post Office to hire private airlines to deliver mail with payments made based on the weight of the mail. The following year, President Calvin Coolidge signed the Air Commerce Act, which shifted the management of air routes to a new branch in the Department of Commerce, which was also responsible for "licensing of planes and pilots, establishing safety regulations, and general promotion".

Barnstorming "seemed to be founded on bravado, with 'one-upmanship' a major incentive". By 1927, competition among barnstormers resulted in their performing increasingly dangerous tricks, and a rash of highly publicized accidents led to new safety regulations, which led to the demise of barnstorming. Spurred by a perceived need to protect the public and in response to political pressure by local pilots upset at barnstormers competing for local customers, the federal government enacted laws to regulate a fledgling civil aviation sector.

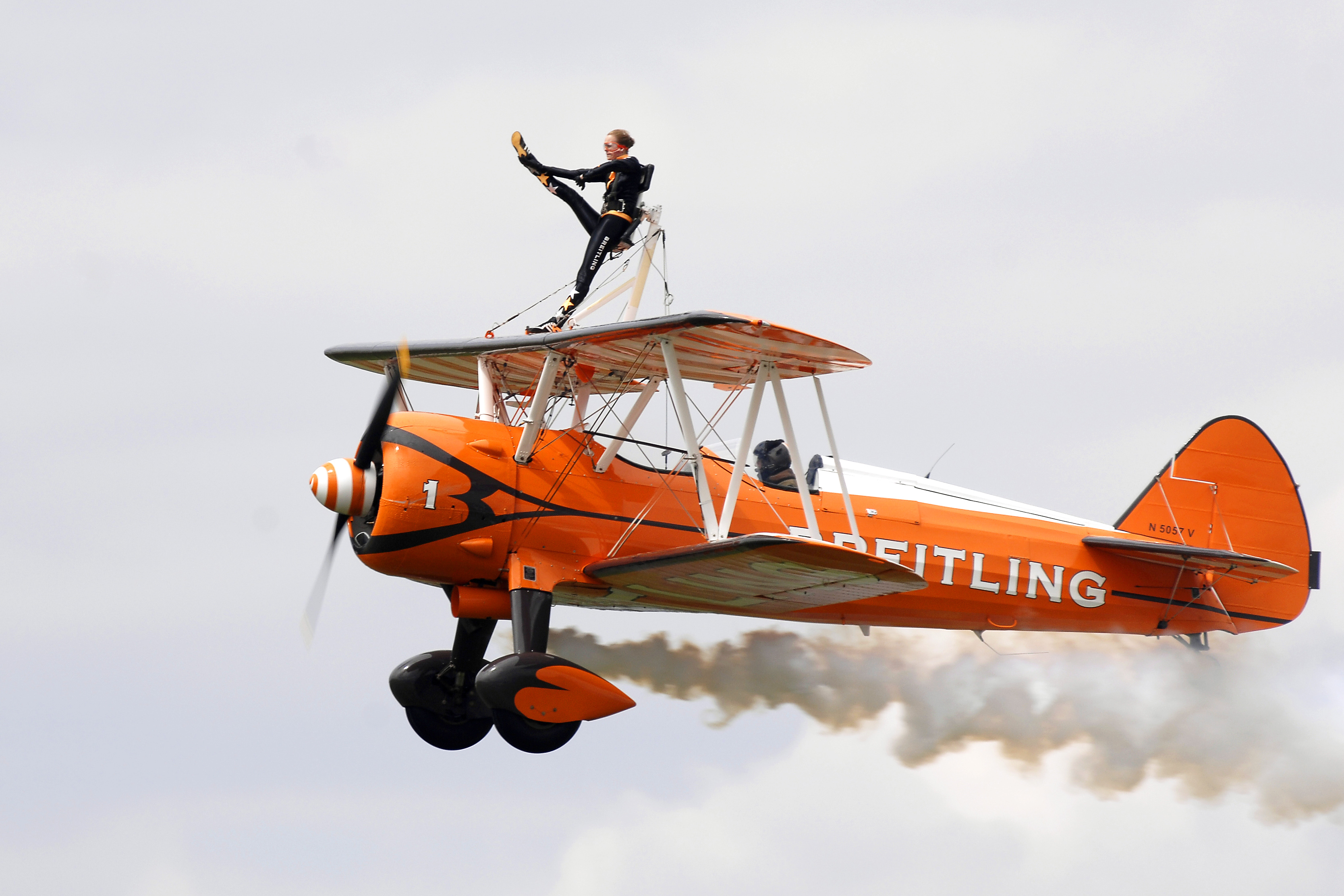
Breitling Wingwalkers

The laws included safety standards and specifications that were virtually impossible for barnstormers to meet, such as the minimum altitude at which certain tricks could be performed (making it harder for spectators to see what was happening). The military also stopped selling Jennys in the late 1920s. This made it too difficult for barnstormers to make a living. Clyde Pangborn, who was the pilot of the two-man aviation team who were the first to cross the Pacific Ocean nonstop in 1931, ended his barnstorming career in 1931. Some pilots, however, continued to wander the country giving rides as late as fall 1941.

== Performances ==
=== Planning ===
"Barnstorming season" ran from early spring until after the harvest and county fairs in the fall. Most barnstorming shows started with a pilot, or team of pilots flying over a small rural town to attract local attention. They would then land at a local farm (hence the term "barnstorming") and negotiate for the use of a field as a temporary runway from which to stage an air show and offer airplane rides. After obtaining a base of operation, the pilot or group of aviators would "buzz" the village and drop flyers. In some towns the arrival of a barnstormer or an aerial troupe would lead to a town-wide shutdown as people attended the show.

=== Stunts ===
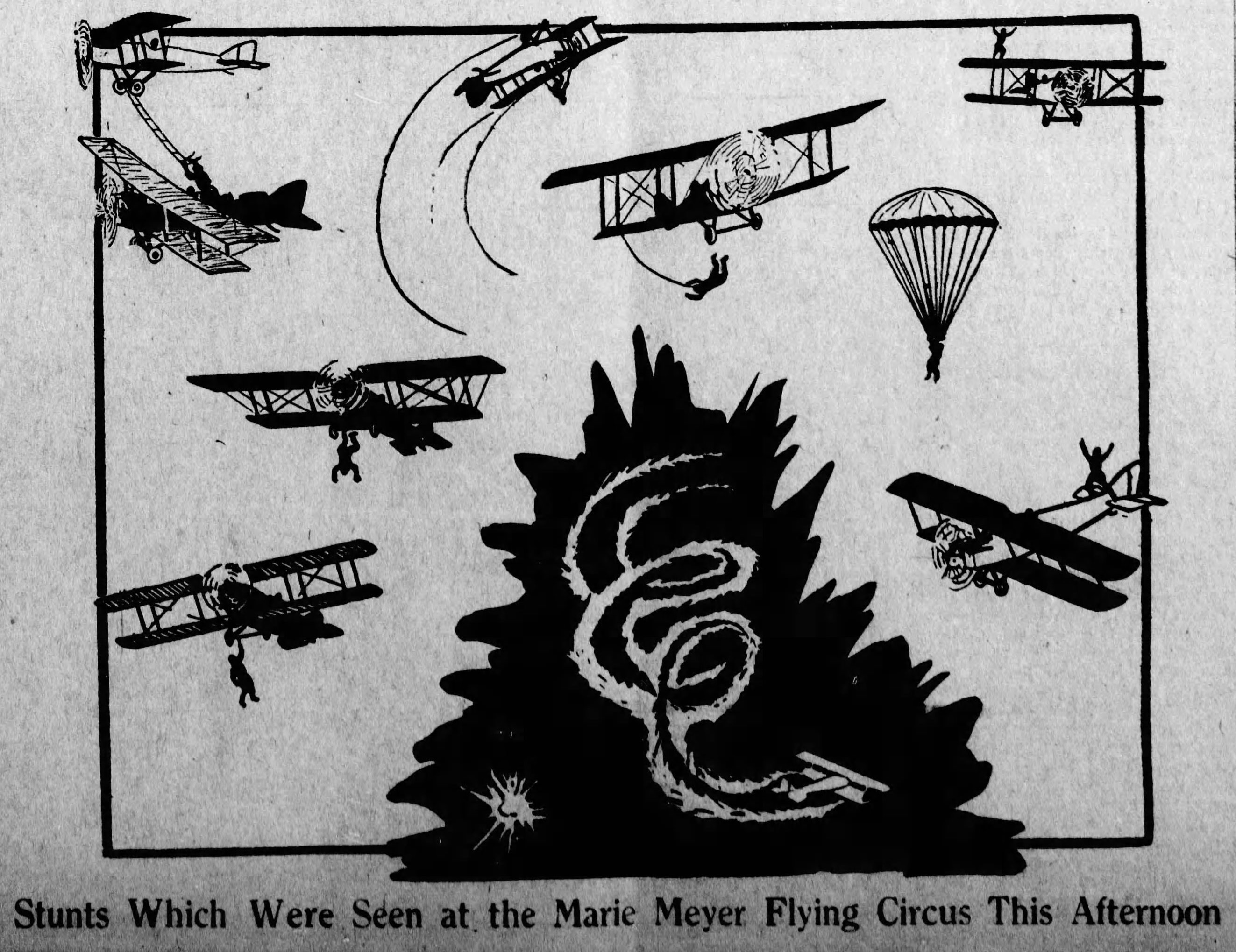
Stunts which were seen at the Marie Meyer Flying Circus, 1924

Barnstormers performed a variety of stunts, with some specializing as stunt pilots or aerialists. Stunt pilots performed a variety of aerobatic maneuvers, including spins, dives, loop-the-loops and barrel rolls. Meanwhile, aerialists performed feats of wing walking, stunt parachuting, midair plane transfers, or even playing tennis, target shooting, and dancing on the plane's wings.

=== Business ===
Barnstormers offered plane rides for a small fee. Lindbergh, for example, charged five dollars for a 15-minute ride in his plane. However exciting and glamorous, it was not an easy way to make a steady living. To make ends meet, the barnstormers—including Charles Lindbergh—often had to moonlight as flying instructors, handymen, gas station attendants, etc. Barnstormers often traded plane rides for room and board, both for commercial lodging and in private homes.

== Notable barnstormers ==
- Jimmie Angel
- Pancho Barnes
- Lincoln Beachey
- Lillian Boyer
- Jerrie Cobb
- Alan Cobham
- Bessie Coleman
- Doug Davis
- Roland Garros
- Tex Johnston
- Hubert Julian
- William Carpenter Lambert
- Charles Lindbergh
- Didier Masson
- Marie Meyer
- John Moisant
- Clyde Pangborn
- Louis Paulhan
- Adolphe Pégoud
- Wiley Post
- Harriet Quimby
- Tex Rankin
- Abraham Whalomie Raygorodsky
- René Simon
- Slonnie Sloniger
- Dean Smith
- Roscoe Turner
- Ernst Udet
- Richard Bach

== In popular culture ==
=== Literature ===
- William Faulkner's 1935 novel Pylon tells the story of a group of barnstormers.
- Nevil Shute's 1951 novel Round the Bend gives a detailed account of the activities of Alan Cobham's National Aviation Day. Archive sources show that Shute, in research for writing the book, wrote to Cobham to check details.
- Many of Richard Bach's novels feature modern barnstormers as protagonists, or otherwise incorporate barnstorming.
- Philip Jose Farmer's 1982 book A Barnstormer in Oz featured a barnstorming pilot named Hank Stover.

=== Film and television ===
- The Tarnished Angels (1957) – melodrama by Douglas Sirk based on the Faulkner novel about barnstorming
- Those Magnificent Men in Their Flying Machines (1965) – comedy about the "pioneer era" (1903–1914) of air racing and barnstorming in Europe
- The Gypsy Moths (1969) – American drama film directed by John Frankenheimer starring Burt Lancaster and Deborah Kerr, based on the novel of the same name by James William Drought
- Ace Eli and Rodger of the Skies (1973) – based on a story by Steven Spielberg starring Cliff Robertson as a Jenny pilot who barnstorms with his young son
- The Great Waldo Pepper (1975)
- Nothing by Chance (1975) – documentary by Hugh Downs about the biplanes that barnstormed across America in the 1920s
- Days of Heaven (1978) – movie by Terrence Mallick in which a barnstorming troupe visits a farm and performs
- The MTV show Nitro Circus features Travis Pastrana, Jolene Van Vugt, and Erik Roner wing-walking on a biplane without chutes or harnesses

=== Video games ===
- In 1982, Activision produced a Barnstorming game cartridge for the Atari 2600.
- In RollerCoaster Tycoon 2, the "Barnstorming Roller Coaster" has coaster cars that are replica biplanes.
- In RollerCoaster Tycoon 3's Wild! Expansion Pack, a "Barn Stormer" ride can be built.
- In Kentucky Route Zero, the small town surrounding 5 dogwood drive was established and lived in by a troupe of barnstormers.

=== Music ===
- "The Immelmann Turn" by Al Stewart, a song set in the 1920s barnstorming era which refers to an aerobatic maneuver of the same name
- "Barn Storming" by State Radio

== See also ==
- Air show
- Historic Aircraft Restoration Museum
- United States government role in civil aviation
