= National Aviation =

National Aviation may refer to:

- Civil aviation authority, also known as a national aviation authority, the government statutory authority in each country that oversees the approval and regulation of civil aviation
- National Aviation Academy (NAA), an aviation maintenance training school located in Clearwater, Florida
- Aviación Nacional (Nationalist Aviation), the air force established by the army in revolt in the Spanish Civil War
- National Aviation Hall of Fame, located at the National Museum of the United States Air Force
- National Aviation University, a university located in Kyiv, Ukraine
- National Aviation Day, a United States national observation
- National Aviation Company of India Limited (NACIL)
- National Aviation Facilities Experimental Center (NAFEC)
- Australian National Aviation Museum, at the Moorabbin Airport in Melbourne
- China National Aviation Corporation
- Rantoul National Aviation Center, a public airport located in Rantoul, Illinois
