= List of Alpha Eta Rho chapters =

Alpha Eta Rho is a coed international professional college aviation fraternity. In the following list of chapters, active chapters are indicated in bold and inactive chapters and institutions are in italics.

Chapter	Charter date and range	Institution	Location	Status	Ref.
**Alpha**	April 10, 1929	University of Southern California	Los Angeles, California	Active	
Beta (Original)	November 25, 1936 – 19xx ?	University of California, Los Angeles	Los Angeles, California	Inactive, Reassigned	
Gamma (Original)	1936–1942	Northwestern University	Evanston, Illinois	Inactive, Reassigned	
Delta (Original)	1939–1942	San Diego State University	San Diego, California	Inactive, Reassigned	
Epsilon	December 5, 1939 – 1942	Duke University	Durham, North Carolina	Inactive	
Zeta (Original)	1940–1942	Pasadena Junior College	Pasadena, California	Inactive, Reassigned	
**Eta**	April 27, 1940	San Jose State University	San Jose, California	Active	
Theta (Original) ?	194x ?–1942 ?	North Carolina State University	Raleigh, North Carolina	Inactive, Reassigned	(Note: It has not yet been confirmed if this group was ever chartered.)
Iota (Original)	1946–19xx ?	University of Southern California, Santa Maria	Santa Maria, California	Inactive, Reassigned	
Kappa	March 1949–1965	University of Denver	Denver, Colorado	Inactive	
Lambda	1950–19xx ?	Northrop Aeronautical Institute	Inglewood, California	Inactive	(Note: Northrop Aeronautical Institute became the Northrop Institute of Technology in 1953. It was renamed Northrop University in 1971. The university closed in August 1993.)
Mu	1950–1952	University of California, Riverside	Riverside, California	Inactive	
**Nu**	May 18, 1950	Mt. San Antonio College	Walnut, California	Active	
Xi	December 17, 1957 – xxxx ?	San Bernardino Valley College	San Bernardino, California	Inactive	
Omicron (Original)	April 24, 1954 – 19xx ?	American University	Washington, D.C.	Inactive	
**Pi**	March 17, 1950	Parks College of Aviation, Engineering and Technology, Saint Louis University	St. Louis, Missouri	Active	
Rho	1950–19xx ?	University of Tennessee	Knoxville, Tennessee	Inactive	
Sigma (Original)	April 4, 1951 – 19xx ?	Los Angeles City College	Los Angeles, California	Inactive, Reassigned	
**Chi**	February 24, 1954	University of Illinois Urbana-Champaign	Urbana, Illinois	Active	
Tau	February 18, 1956 – 20xx ?	College of San Mateo	San Mateo, California	Inactive	
Alpha Rho	February 1956–1965	Norwich University	Northfield, Vermont	Inactive	
Upsilon				Inactive ?	
**Phi**	January 8, 1957	Farmingdale State College	East Farmingdale, New York	Active	
**Phi Kappa**	January 8, 1957	St. Francis College	Brooklyn, New York	Active	
Psi	1957–1965	Stephens College	Columbia, Missouri	Inactive	
Omega	November 1960–xxxx ?	Seoul National University	Seoul, South Korea	Inactive	(Note: Baird's 20th edition indicates that this is a national chapter.)
Pi Rho (Original)	Fall 1961–196x ?; October 2, 1963 – April 1965	Embry–Riddle Aeronautical University	Miami, Florida	Moved	(Note: The chapter went inactive but reformed in 1963. When the college relocated from Miami to Daytona Beach in 1965, the fraternity moved with it.)
**Beta (Second)**	November 20, 1962	Purdue University	West Lafayette, Indiana	Active	
**Sigma (Second)**	October 10, 1963	Southern Illinois University Carbondale	Carbondale, Illinois	Active	
Epsilon Rho	April 1965 – November 15, 1971	Embry–Riddle Aeronautical University	Daytona Beach, Florida	Inactive	(Note: When the college closed in Miami campus in 1965, the fraternity followed the school to the Daytona Beach campus. In 1971, the chapter voted to become a colony of Lambda Chi Alpha, a social fraternity.)
**Gamma (Second)**	November 1, 1966	Auburn University	Auburn, Alabama	Active	
**Delta (Second)**	November 16, 1966	University of North Dakota	Grand Forks, North Dakota	Active	
**Theta (Second)**	April 8, 1967	Western Michigan University	Kalamazoo, Michigan	Active	
**Kappa Alpha**	January 17, 1968	Kent State University	Kent, Ohio	Active	
**Beta Gamma**	May 14, 1968	Bowling Green State University	Bowling Green, Ohio	Active	
**Omicron (Second)**	May 14, 1968	Southeastern Oklahoma State University	Durant, Oklahoma	Active	
**Phi Lambda Upsilon**	May 27, 1968	Utah State University	Logan, Utah	Active	
**Omicron Psi**	December 2, 1968	University of Louisiana at Monroe	Monroe, Louisiana	Active	
**Zeta (Second)**	December 18, 1968	Dowling College	Oakdale, New York	Active	
**Lambda Rho**	February 16, 1969	Lewis University	Romeoville, Illinois	Active	
Pi Epsilon	March 28, 1969 – xxxx ?	St. Petersburg Junior College	Clearwater, Florida	Inactive	
Delta Alpha	March 31, 1969 – xxxx ?	Cochise College	Cochise County, Arizona	Inactive	
**Sigma Nu**	May 27, 1969	Cypress College	Cypress, California	Active	
Omicron Pi	1969–xxxx ?	Northeast Louisiana University	Monroe, Louisiana	Inactive	
**Lambda Tau**	March 24, 1970	Louisiana Tech University	Ruston, Louisiana	Active	
Alpha Iota	April 12, 1970 – xxxx ?	Drake University	Des Moines, Iowa	Inactive	
Kappa Rho	May 21, 1970 – xxxx ?	Johnson County Community College	Overland Park, Kansas	Inactive	
**Alpha Sigma**	May 23, 1970	Arizona State University	Tempe, Arizona	Active	
**Alpha Delta**	May 24, 1970	Wilmington University	Wilmington Manor, Delaware	Active	
**Iota Rho**	May 25, 1970	Indiana State University	Terre Haute, Indiana	Active	
Iota (Second)	1970 ?–xxxx ?	Ricks College	Rexburg, Idaho	Inactive	
**Mu Tau**	November 1, 1970	Middle Tennessee State University	Murfreesboro, Tennessee	Active	
Delta Chi	November 6, 1970 – 1980	Boise State University	Boise, Idaho	Inactive	
**Sigma Phi**	November 8, 1970	Metropolitan State University of Denver	Denver, Colorado	Active	
Epsilon Chi	November 1970–xxxx ?	Southwest Missouri State University	Springfield, Missouri	Inactive	
Kappa Tau	November 15, 1970 – xxxx ?	Gateway Technical College	Kenosha, Wisconsin	Inactive	(Note: This chapter was chartered at Kenosha Technical Institute, which merged to become the Tri-County Technical Institute in 1971. In 1972, the school's name changed to Gateway Technical Institute.)
**Tau Sigma**	November 9, 1970	Tennessee State University	Nashville, Tennessee	Active	
Alpha Phi	February 17, 1971 – c. 2015	Community College of Beaver County	Beaver County, Pennsylvania	Inactive	
**Alpha Alpha**	April 20, 1971	University of Alaska Anchorage	Anchorage, Alaska	Active	
**Alpha Pi**	November 14, 1971	Texas State Technical Institute	Waco, Texas	Active	
Sigma Rho	February 18, 1972 – xxxx ?	Orange Coast College	Costa Mesa, California	Inactive	
**Delta Pi**	April 25, 1972	Northwestern State University	Natchitoches, Louisiana	Active	
Mu Delta	June 27, 1973 – xxxx ?	Miami Dade Community College North Campus	Westview, Florida	Inactive	
**Delta Phi**	October 25, 1973	Mercer County Community College	Trenton, New Jersey	Active	
Pi Alpha	April 29, 1974 – xxxx ?	Palomar College	San Diego County, California	Inactive	
**Beta Sigma**	May 3, 1974	Vincennes University	Vincennes, Indiana	Active	
**Sigma Alpha**	June 10, 1974	Florida Institute of Technology	Melbourne, Florida	Active	
**Chi Sigma**	December 7, 1975	Chattanooga State Community College	Chattanooga, Tennessee	Active	
**Upsilon Delta**	November 10, 1976	University of Dubuque	Dubuque, Iowa	Active	
**Lambda Pi**	September 28, 1978	University of Central Missouri	Warrensburg, Missouri	Active	
Upsilon Alpha	1979–1981; March 27, 1984 – xxxx ?	Westminster College	Salt Lake City, Utah	Inactive	
**Nu Gamma**	March 23, 1979	Miami Dade College	Homestead, Florida	Active	
**Pi Rho**	April 5, 1979	Embry–Riddle Aeronautical University	Prescott, Arizona	Active	
**Chi Rho**	February 4, 1980	Central Washington University	Ellensburg, Washington	Active	
Tau Rho	March 7, 1980 – xxxx ?	Volunteer State Community College	Gallatin, Tennessee	Inactive	
**Eta Pi**	May 9, 1980	Broward College South Campus	Pembroke Pines, Florida	Active	
Delta Tau	February 13, 1981 – xxxx ?	Delaware Technical Community College	Dover, Delaware	Inactive	
**Omicron Sigma Upsilon**	February 15, 1983	Ohio State University	Columbus, Ohio	Active	
Delta Nu	April 13, 1983 – xxxx ?	Wichita State University	Wichita, Kansas	Inactive	
**Phi Beta Sigma**	September 17, 1983	Bridgewater State University	Bridgewater, Massachusetts	Active	
Chi Alpha	November 15, 1983 – xxxx ?	Salem-Teikyo University	Salem, West Virginia	Inactive	
**Beta Beta**	December 7, 1983	Henderson State University	Arkadelphia, Arkansas	Active	
**Delta Delta**	March 4, 1984	San Jacinto College	Greater Houston, Texas	Active	
Gamma Sigma	May 8, 1984 – xxxx ?	Georgia State University	Atlanta, Georgia	Inactive	
**Delta Psi**	May 15, 1985	Delta State University	Cleveland, Mississippi	Active	
**Eta Kappa Upsilon**	September 6, 1985	Eastern Kentucky University	Richmond, Kentucky	Active	
Epsilon Omega	January 13, 1986 – xxxx ?	Western Oklahoma State College	Altus, Oklahoma	Inactive	
Nu Alpha	March 8, 1986 – xxxx ?	Southern Illinois University	San Diego, California	Inactive	
Beta Rho	January 13, 1986 – xxxx ?	Lynn University	Boca Raton, Florida	Inactive	
**Lambda Psi**	November 14, 1986	Jacksonville University	Jacksonville, Florida	Active	
**Omicron Upsilon**	May 1, 1987	Ohio University	Athens, Ohio	Active	
**Sigma Chi Upsilon**	January 27, 1989	St. Cloud State University	St. Cloud, Minnesota	Active	
**Sigma Delta**	May 5, 1990	Daniel Webster College	Nashua, New Hampshire	Active	
**Sigma Beta Chi**	January 11, 1991	Spartan College of Aeronautics and Technology	Tulsa, Oklahoma	Active	
**Sigma Chi**	April 14, 1991	Eastern Michigan University	Ypsilanti, Michigan	Active	
Beta Delta	May 11, 1991 – xxxx ?	Navarro College	Corsicana, Texas	Inactive	
**Chi Omicron**	October 7, 1991	College of the Ozarks	Point Lookout, Missouri	Active	
**Delta Sigma**	February 23, 1992 –19xx; September 4, 2026	Delaware State University	Dover, Delaware	Active	
**Xi Tau**	October 31, 1992	Central Texas College	Killeen, Texas	Active	
**Kappa Nu**	December 11, 1992 –xxxx ?; 2022	University of Nebraska at Kearney	Kearney, Nebraska	Active	
**Epsilon Tau**	January 28, 1994	Ivy Tech Community College of Indiana	Columbus and Fort Wayne, Indiana	Active	
**Upsilon Nu Omicron**	October 28, 1994	University of Nebraska Omaha	Omaha, Nebraska	Active	
**Mu Alpha Chi**	November 9, 1994	Fairmont State University	Fairmont, West Virginia	Active	
Alpha Omega	December 2, 1995 – xxxx ?	Texas Southern University	Houston, Texas	Inactive	
Rho Alpha	April 18, 1996 – xxxx ?	Rocky Mountain College	Billings, Montana	Inactive	
**Omicron Gamma**	November 11, 1996	Hampton University	Hampton, Virginia	Active	
**Epsilon Alpha**	November 27, 1996	Shasta College	Redding, California	Active	
**Kappa Sigma Upsilon**	January 21, 1999	Kansas State University	Salina, Kansas	Active	
**Beta Epsilon**	May 7, 1999	San Juan College	Farmington, New Mexico	Active	
Omicron Sigma Tau	May 10, 1999 – xxxx ?	Oklahoma State University–Tulsa	Tulsa, Oklahoma	Inactive	
**Mu Kappa Tau**	November 9, 1999	Minnesota State University, Mankato	Mankato, Minnesota	Active	
**Alpha Chi**	November 13, 1999	Averett University	Danville, Virginia	Active	
**Mu Eta Sigma**	December 9, 1999	University of Maryland Eastern Shore	Princess Anne, Maryland	Active	
Nu Chi Iota	August 25, 2001 – 20xx ?	North Central Institute	Clarksville, Tennessee	Inactive	
**Sigma Delta Sigma**	March 1, 2002	South Dakota State University	Brookings, South Dakota	Active	
Beta Epsilon Alpha	June 8, 2003 – 20xx ?	University of Cincinnati	Cincinnati, Ohio	Inactive	
**Mu Iota Alpha**	April 29, 2004	Florida Memorial University	Miami Gardens, Florida	Active	
**Upsilon Mu**	March 1, 2005	University of Minnesota Crookston	Crookston, Minnesota	Active	
Nu Sigma Phi	December 11, 2006 – 20xx ?	North Shore Community College	Danvers, Massachusetts	Inactive	
**Sigma Xi Omega**	April 24, 2008	Vaughn College of Aeronautics and Technology	New York City, New York	Active	
**Eta Gamma**	April 6, 2009	Middle Georgia State University	Macon, Georgia	Active	
**Epsilon Nu**	December 1, 2010	Utah Valley University	Orem, Utah	Active	
**Psi Nu Tau**	August 6, 2011	University of North Texas	Denton, Texas	Active	
**Pi Iota Chi**	April 8, 2012	Oklahoma State University–Stillwater	Stillwater, Oklahoma	Active	
Omega Phi Gamma	April 26, 2013 – 20xx ?	Arkansas State University Mid-South	West Memphis, Arkansas	Inactive	
**Sigma Delta Chi**	September 2016	San Diego Christian College	Santee, California	Active	
**Alpha Sigma Psi**	January 18, 2018	California Aeronautical University	Bakersfield, California	Active	
**Upsilon Zeta**	February 2020	Elizabeth City State University	Elizabeth City, North Carolina	Active	
**Tau Beta Chi**	September 2020	National Aviation Academy Tampa Bay Campus	Clearwater, Florida	Active	
**Mu Chi**	2022	Cape Cod Community College	West Barnstable, Massachusetts	Active	
**Alpha Mu Tau**	2014– 20xx ?; 2022	MIAT College of Technology	Canton, Michigan	Active	
Alpha Epsilon		Northwestern Michigan College	Traverse City, Michigan	Inactive	
**Beta Chi**		University of Oklahoma	Norman, Oklahoma	Active	
**Gamma Theta Chi**		Guilford Technical Community College	Greensboro, North Carolina	Active	
Nu Eta		University of New Haven	West Haven, Connecticut	Inactive	
Omicron Delta		Wallace State Community College	Hanceville, Alabama	Inactive	
Upsilon Sigma Nu		United States Naval Academy	Annapolis, Maryland	Inactive	
		Bainbridge State College	Bainbridge, Georgia	Inactive	
		Davis College	Toledo, Ohio	Inactive	
		Hawthorne College	Antrim, New Hampshire	Inactive	
		Lehigh Carbon Community College	Schnecksville, Pennsylvania	Inactive	
		Northeastern University	Boston, Massachusetts	Inactive	
		Northwest Arkansas Community College	Bentonville, Arkansas	Inactive	
		Ohlone College	Fremont, California	Inactive	
	19xx ?–1973	Parsons College	Fairfield, Iowa	Inactive	(Note: Chapter went defunct when the college closed.)
		Pepperdine University	Malibu, California	Inactive	
		Richard J. Daley College	Chicago, Illinois	Inactive	
		Riverside City College	Riverside, California	Inactive	
		San Diego Mesa College	San Diego, California	Inactive	
		Seward County Community College	Liberal, Kansas	Inactive	
		Swinburne University of Technology Hawthorn Campus	Hawthorn, Victoria, Australia	Inactive	
		Thaddeus Stevens College of Technology	Lancaster, Pennsylvania	Inactive	
		University of Albuquerque	Albuquerque, New Mexico	Inactive	
		University of Arizona	Tucson, Arizona	Inactive	
		University of Maryland, College Park	College Park, Maryland	Inactive	
		University of South Alabama	Mobile, Alabama	Inactive	
		Woodbury College	Montpelier, Vermont	Inactive	
