= Bon MacDougall =

Canadian racing driver (1901–1970)

- Born: Ronald Griffith MacDougall; August 4, 1901 Winnipeg, Manitoba, Canada
- Died: December 11, 1970 (aged 69) Sun City, California, U.S.

Champ Car career
- 1 race run over 1 year
- First race: 1926 Indianapolis 500 (Indianapolis)
Wins	Podiums	Poles
0	0	0

Ronald Griffith "Bon" MacDougall (August 4, 1901 – December 11, 1970) was a Canadian racing driver and a founding member of the 13 Black Cats aerial stunt group, established in 1924.

== Biography ==
One day in Los Angeles, an airshow was scheduled at the Burdette Airport and School of Aviation. When the performers did not show up, MacDougall, a part-owner of the airport, persuaded Spider Matlock and Ken Nichols, two friends who had come to watch the show, to help him. According to Nichols, after five minutes of instruction, the pair performed as wing walkers, with MacDougall flying the airplane. The burgeoning field of aviation reached Hollywood, and stunt pilots were needed. In 1924, MacDougall, Nichols and Matlock formed a group called the Black Cats, later renamed the 13 Black Cats, to perform aerial stunts for movies. Each of the Black Cats was supposed to have a name that was 13 letters long, which is how MacDougall acquired the nickname "Bon". The group lasted five years, but eventually succumbed to increased safety regulations and cut-rate competition.

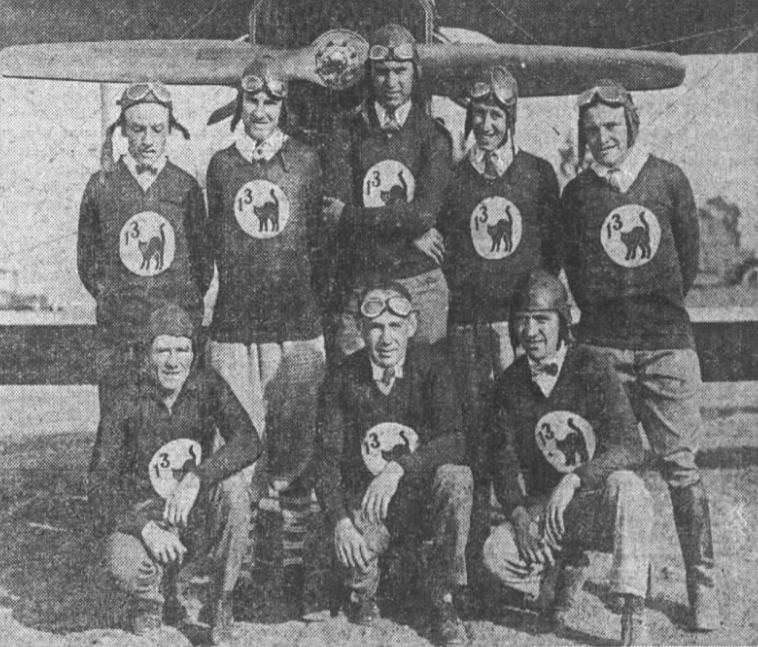
13 Black Cats, circa 1925; MacDougall is standing in the back row, second from left

MacDougall competed in the 1926 Indianapolis 500, driving a Miller car. He completed 19 laps before retiring due to a water leak. MacDougall won $512 in that race.

According to the Internet Pinball Database, MacDougall designed five pinball games for the Pacific Amusement Manufacturing Company of Chicago and Bally Manufacturing Corporation in 1934 and 1935. He received several patents for pinball game features during this period.

MacDougall became a US citizen in 1940.

== Motorsports career results ==
=== Indianapolis 500 results ===
Year	Car	Start	Qual	Rank	Finish	Laps	Led	Retired
1926	34	9	105.180	9	26	19	0	Valve
Totals						19	0	

Starts	1
Poles	0
Front Row	0
Wins	0
Top 5	0
Top 10	0
Retired	1

== See also ==
- List of Canadians in Champ Car
