= Spider Matlock =

American stuntman and stunt pilot

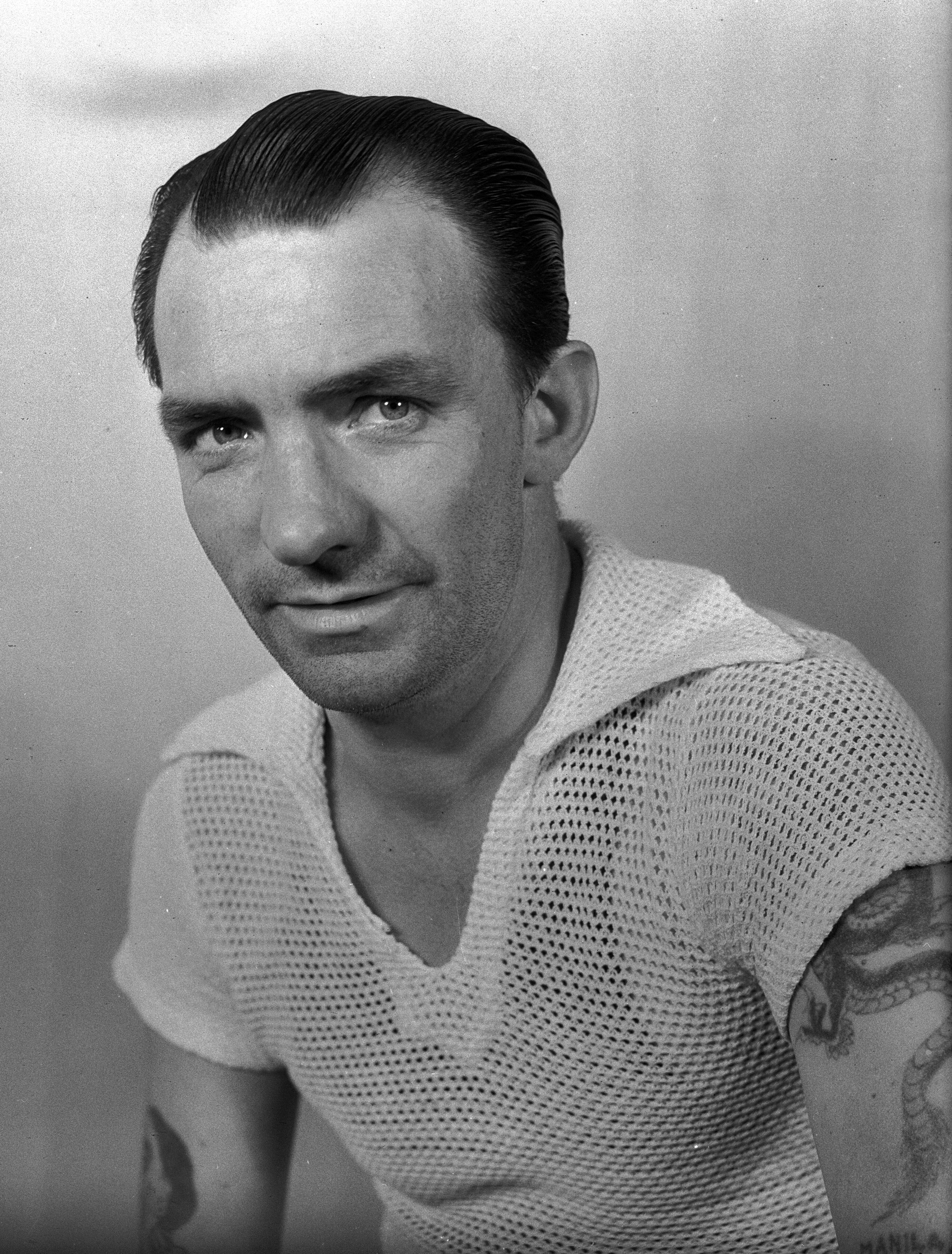
Matlock in 1935

William Earnest "Spider" Matlock (June 30, 1901, St. Joseph, Missouri – January 27, 1936) was an American stuntman, stunt pilot, car racing promoter, driver and mechanic.

== Stunt flying ==
One day, an airshow was scheduled at the Burdette Air Port and School of Aviation in Los Angeles. When the performers did not show up, Ronald MacDougall, a part-owner of the airport, persuaded Matlock (a student at the aviation school) and Ken Nichols to help him. After five minutes of instruction (according to Nichols), the pair performed as wing walkers, with MacDougall flying the airplane.

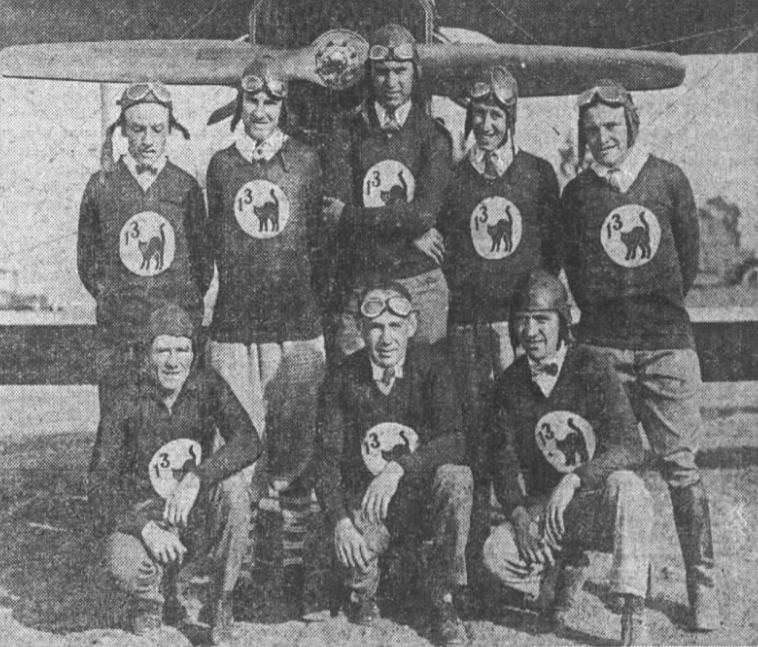
Some of the 13 Black Cats, circa 1925. Matlock is in the front row, kneeling on the far right.

The burgeoning field of aviation reached Hollywood, and stunt pilots were needed. In 1924, MacDougall, Nichols and Matlock, formed a group called the Black Cats, later renamed the 13 Black Cats, to set standards and rates for aerial stunts for movies. Each of the Black Cats was supposed to have a name that was 13 letters long, which is how Matlock acquired the nickname "Spider", MacDougall got "Bon" and Nichols "Fronty". Among other things, they charged $1500 to blow up an airplane in mid-air. Matlock was once asked to do just that at 2,000 feet (610 m) by a newsreel company. Something went wrong; explosives had been rigged on the wings with a switch with a 30-second delay, but went off prematurely before Matlock could parachute to safety. Fortunately, he survived.

As the 1920s came to a close, the 13 Black Cats succumbed to increased safety regulations and cut-rate competition.

== Auto racing ==
Matlock also participated in auto racing, becoming "a promoter, driver and starter in California 'outlaw' racing circles". He was the riding mechanic for winning 1930 Indianapolis 500 driver Billy Arnold. They also teamed together for the 1931 and 1932 races, but crashed both times while leading, in the 162nd and 59th laps, respectively. The first time, Matlock was flung 200 feet (61 m), but landed on some grass and only suffered a collarbone broken in three places. The second time, he was badly injured, with a skull fracture and many broken bones (a collarbone, six ribs, a shoulder, pelvis and hip), but was back racing in six weeks, only to break his nose and a thumb in yet another racing crash. He also teamed with Ernie Triplett in the 1933 Indianapolis 500.

He was scheduled to compete as a driver in the 1936 race for Ford, but his luck finally ran out. He and driver Al Gordon crashed at Ascot Speedway in Los Angeles on January 26, 1936; Gordon died that day, while Matlock succumbed the following day.

He appeared as himself (uncredited) in the 1932 auto racing film The Crowd Roars, starring James Cagney.
