= Gladys Ingle =

American pilot wing walker (1899–1981)

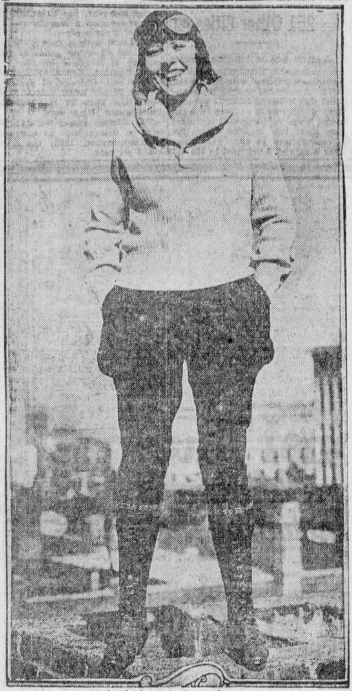
- Ingle in 1923
- Born: March 28, 1899; Walla Walla, Washington, US
- Died: October 27, 1981 (aged 82); Arroyo Grande, California, US
- Occupations: Pilot; wing walker
- Known for: Wing walking

Gladys Ingle (March 28, 1899 – October 27, 1981) was an American pilot, a wing walker and a member of the aerial stunt team the 13 Black Cats.

Ingle was the fourth licensed woman pilot from the United States. She began performing jumps from balloons for the C.P.O. Aerial Circus in 1921. By 1922, she had begun doing stunts involving airplanes. Through her performances in the 1920s and 1930s, she became world-renowned for her aerobatics and wing walking.

== Early life ==
On March 28, 1899, Gladys Ingle was born in Walla Walla, Washington. She had two brothers and one sister. In 1929, she said as a child growing up in Oregon she walked on fences and created stilts so tall that she had to mount them from the roof of her home. She then began racing motorcycles, before moving to Southern California.

== Career ==
Gladys Ingle changing a wheel in mid-air

Ingle was the fourth woman to earn a pilot license. In 1921, she and her sister Ann both performed as members of the C.P.O. Aerial Circus, parachuting out of balloons. In 1922, she performed her first stunt involving an airplane when she and her sister performed an airplane parachute race jumping from separate planes.

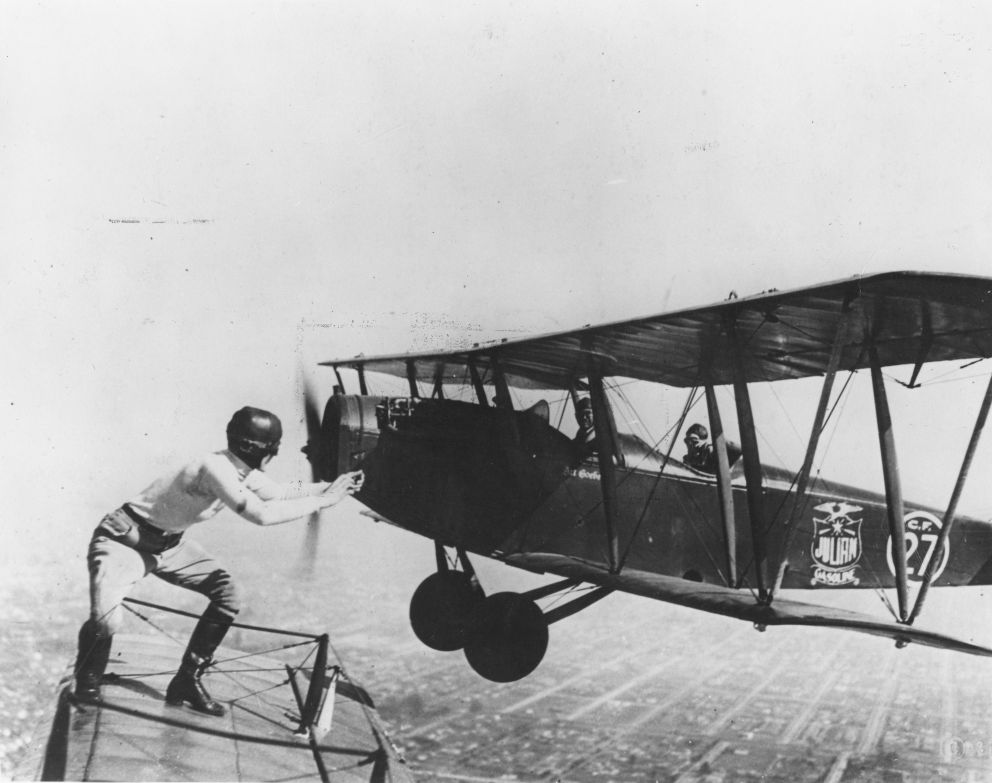
Gladys Ingle is preparing to move from Bon MacDougall's Jenny to Art Goebel's aircraft mid-air

Gladys Ingle became the only female member of the 13 Black Cats. She performed in aerial stunts during the 1920s and 1930s. She was renowned for her stunts and wing walking. Some of her stunts included moving from plane to plane in mid-air, and flying on the wing of a plane while it passed under a bridge. One of Ingle's stunts involved replacing a wheel in mid-air. When a wheel would fall off an airplane mid flight, Ingle would strap a spare wheel on her back and be flown to a rendezvous with the stricken plane. In mid-air, she would climb from the first plane to the top of the upper wing of the second plane and transfer to the bottom wing of the plane in distress. She would then climb down to the landing gear and install the wheel. This was filmed on at least one occasion.

In another stunt, she would shoot arrows at targets while wing walking. When asked if she ever got scared, she said, "Nothing to it at all, nothing to it." She was involved in several forced landings and plane crashes. One of her most daring stunts was to stand on the wing of an aircraft while it "looped the loop".

In 1928, The San Bernardino County Sun reported that Ingle doubled for movie stars and appeared in films. In her career, she successfully transferred from the wing of one aircraft to the wing of another in mid-air more than 300 times.

== Personal life and legacy ==
Ingle made her home in Southern California. In 1981, she moved to Arroyo Grande, California, to live with her daughter Bonnie. She died at her daughter's home on October 27, 1981.

Pictures and films of Gladys Ingle exist in aviation museums and at the Smithsonian Air & Space Museum.
