= Lillian Boyer =

American wing walker (1901–1989)

Lillian Amelia Boyer
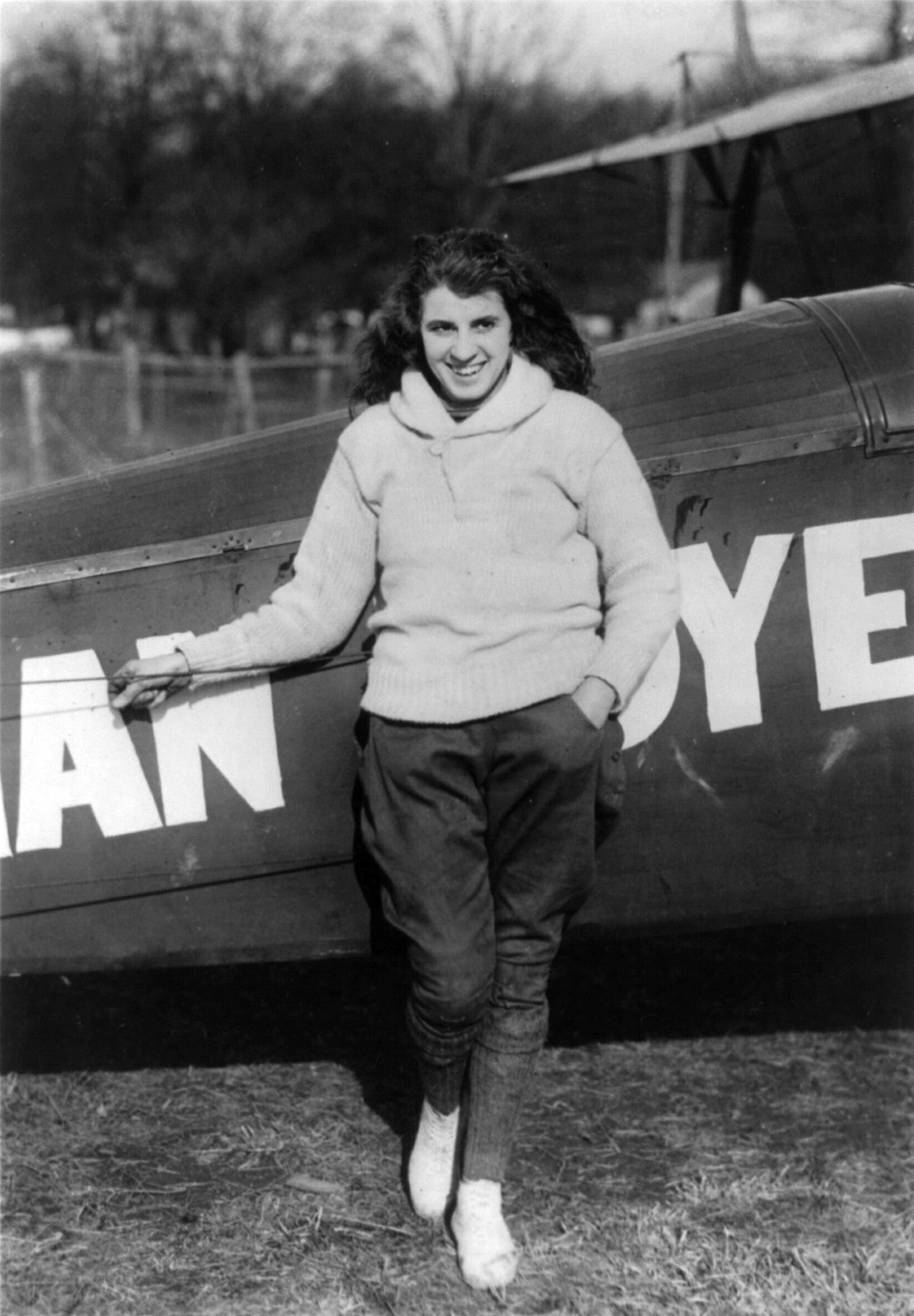
- Lillian Boyer in 1922

Personal information
- Nationality: American
- Born: January 15, 1901 Hooper, Nebraska
- Died: February 1, 1989 (aged 88) Steuben, Wisconsin

Sport
- Sport: Wing walking, airplane stunts

Lillian Boyer (January 15, 1901 – February 1, 1989) was an American wing walker who performed numerous aerial stunts that included wing walking, automobile-to-airplane transfers, and parachute jumps between 1921 and 1929.

== Wing walking career ==
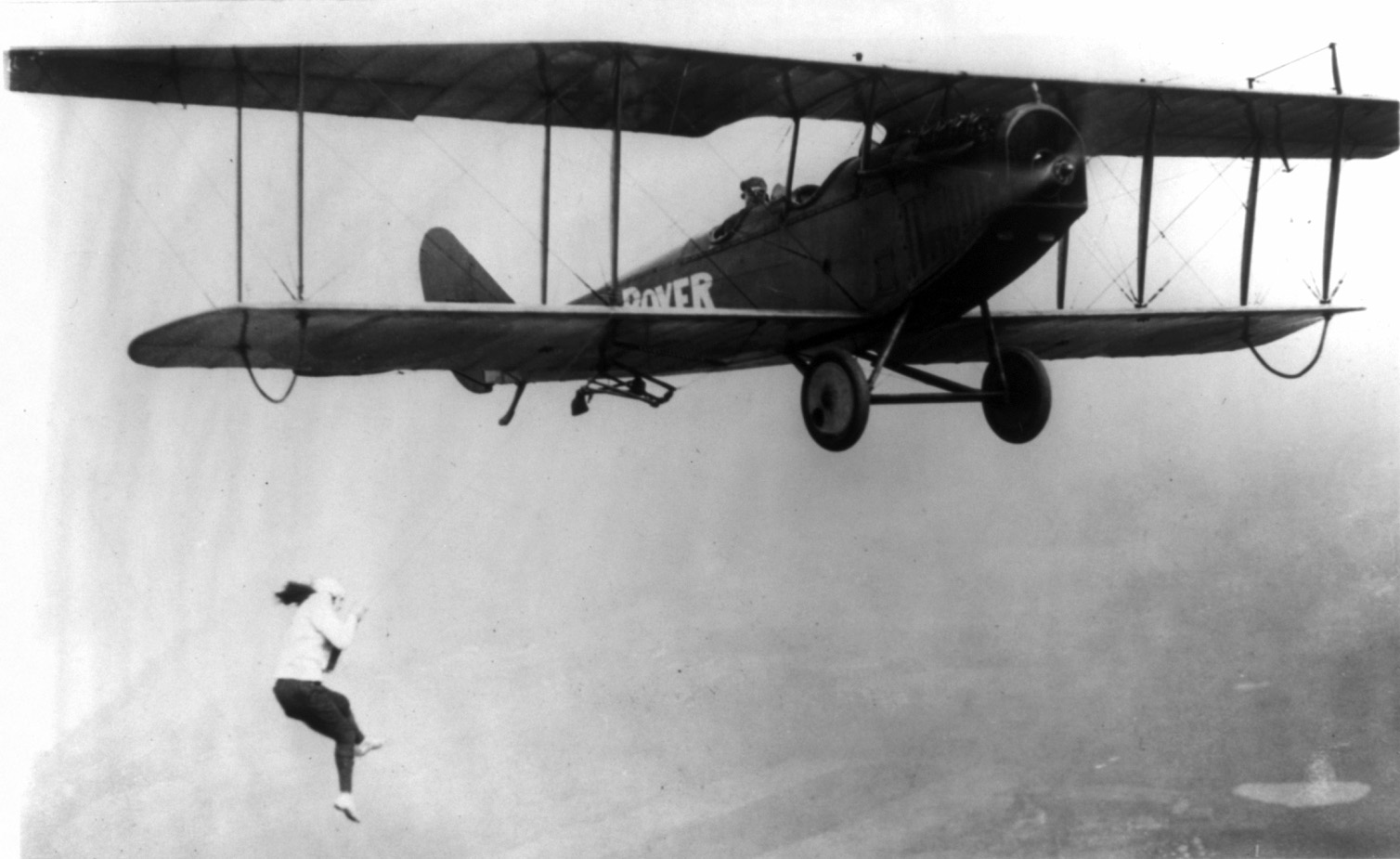
Performing a stunt called the "breakaway"

Working as a restaurant waitress but eager to fly in an airplane, in 1921 Lillian Boyer was invited by two restaurant customers to take an airplane ride. On her second flight, she climbed out on the wing thus beginning her career as an aerial performer.

In December 1921, she began five months of training with pilot Lt. Billy Brock, former World War I pilot and barnstormer.

She performed daring stunts and achieved great public acclaim. She was the first woman to change from a speeding automobile to an airplane. According to a 1922 Milwaukee newspaper, she was "without doubt the greatest thrill-producer since the days of the gladiators.”

In 1929, due to federal regulations on low flying and unsafe planes, she and many other barnstormers were forced into retirement.

Her performances included 352 shows in 41 US states and Canada, most of them consisting of wing-walking; 143 automobile-to-plane changes; and 37 parachute jumps (13 of which were done into Lake Erie).

== Later life ==
Boyer's final stunt was on September 8, 1928, in Bethany, Missouri. After losing the last of her money in the stock market crash, she worked as a hat-check girl, where she reconnected with childhood acquaintance Ernest Werner. In 1937, they married, and they moved to Los Angeles in 1944. Lillian Werner moved to San Diego in 1976 where she passed in February 1989.

== See also ==
- Air Commerce Act, 1926
