= 13 Black Cats =

Group of stunt performers

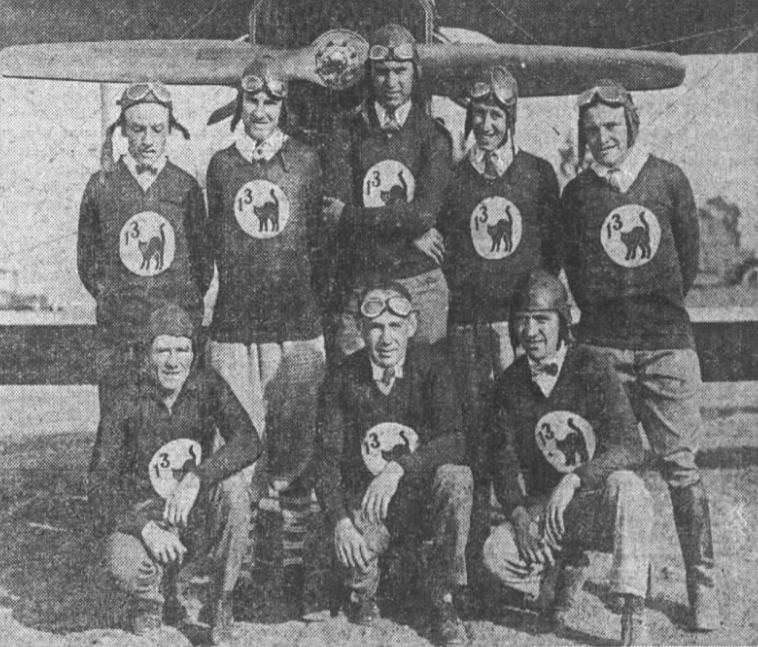
13 Black Cats, circa 1925. Front (left to right): McClelland, Greenwald, Matlock. Back (left to right): Johnson, MacDougall, Goebel, Nichols, Richter.

The 13 Black Cats, also known as the 13 Flying Black Cats or simply the Black Cats, was a 1920s group of Los Angeles–based performers who would do stunts, primarily using airplanes and also including motorcycles and automobiles, for a set price. Examples included upside-down flying for $100 and blowing up an airplane in mid-air for $1500. They performed at airshows and in movies and were featured in newsreels of the era. The group's advertising used the tagline "If a Black Cat can't do it—It can't be done."

== History ==
On its founding in 1924, the group had 13 members, led by Ronald "Bon" MacDougall (1901–1970), and was based at Burdette Airport—of which MacDougall was a part-owner, and where some of them worked or learned to fly—at Western Avenue and 102nd Street in Los Angeles, California. The group disbanded in 1929 due to competition from cut-rate pilots.

The uniform of the Black Cats was a black sweater which was adorned on the front with a cat and a number 13 patch. The members had their name on the back. The logo of the group was a black cat turned sideways with an arched back standing on a fence with a full moon visible.

== Members ==
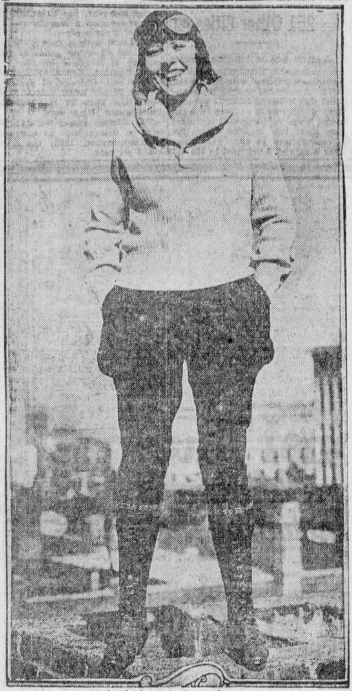
Gladys Ingle in 1923

Members of the group were supposed to have a name that was 13 letters long; some of those who did not satisfy this requirement acquired nicknames. Membership varied, but included the following:

- "Loot" Barber, so nicknamed because he was a lieutenant in the United States Army Reserve, according to Howard Batt
- Howard Batt (1900–1988)
- Reginald Denny (1891–1967), British actor
- Art Goebel (1895–1973)
- Sam Greenwald
- Gladys Ingle (1899–1981), a wing walker
- Al Johnson
- Bon MacDougall (1901–1970)
- William "Spider" Matlock (1901–1936)
- George "Slim" Maves
- Heard "Herd" McClellan
- Kenneth "Fronty" Nichols (1902–1975)
- Freddy Osborne
- Jerry Phillips
- Paul E. Richter (1896–1949)
- Ivan Unger

Goebel won the deadly 1927 Dole Air Race from Oakland, California, to Honolulu, Hawaii, which claimed 10 lives before, during, and after the race.

One of Ingle's notable stunts was going to the rescue of an airplane which had "lost" a wheel while in the air. She would strap a spare on her back, rendezvous with the "stricken" airplane, climb to the top of the upper wing of the second airplane and transfer to the bottom wing of the airplane in distress. She would then climb down to the landing gear and install the wheel. The stunt was captured in a newsreel (see External links below). Another stunt was pretending to play tennis on the top wing.

Matlock was also a car racer and riding mechanic; he was killed in a crash in a race at Legion Ascot Speedway.

Richter was later a co-founder of Standard Air Lines and executive vice president of Trans World Airlines (TWA).
