= Abraham Raygorodsky =

Ukrainian-American aviation pioneer

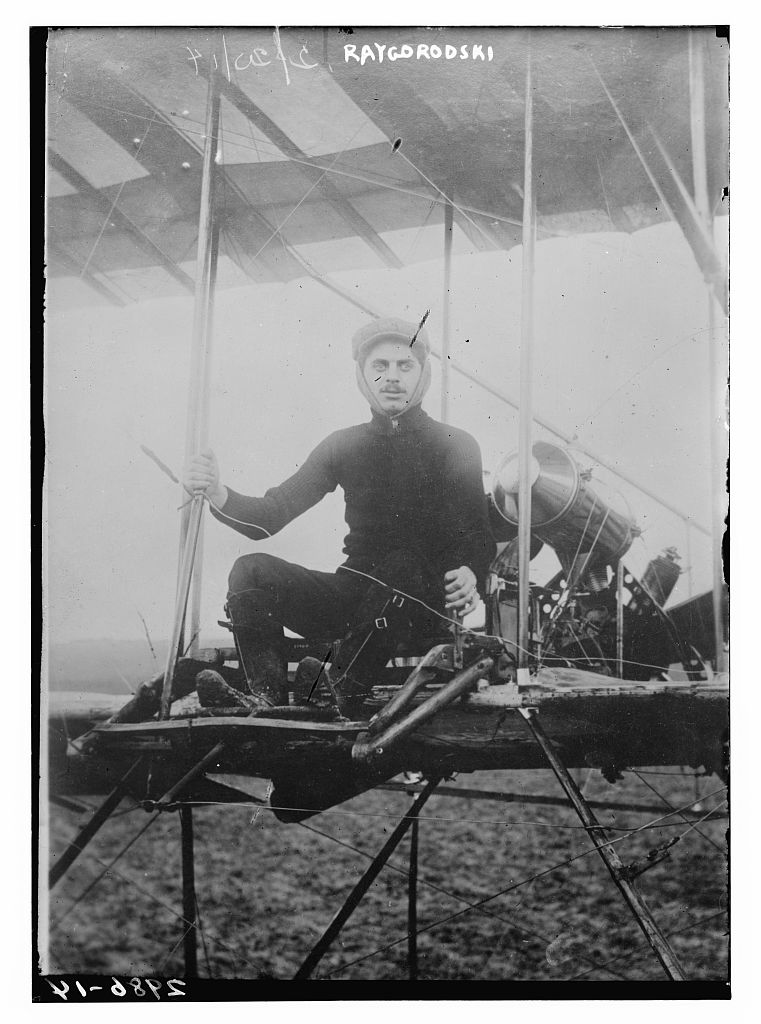

Abraham Wladimir Raygorodsky (Ukrainian: Авраам Володимирович Райгородський; June 4, 1884 – ?), nicknamed Aviator Ray, was a Ukrainian-American aviation pioneer.

== Biography ==
Raygorodsky was born into a Jewish family in 1884 in Haisyn in central Ukraine, then in the Russian Empire. He trained at the Farman flying school in Paris and received his pilot's certificate from the Aero Club of France around 1910. He immigrated to the United States in 1911 and became a citizen in 1919. In 1914, he attempted to win a $50,000 prize from Alfred Harmsworth, 1st Viscount Northcliffe. His Daily Mail aviation prize was for the first transatlantic flight.

In 1916, Raygorodsky announced that his Bridgeport, Connecticut-based company, International Aerial Navigation Co., was going to manufacture planes for $50,000 each, including "aerial ferries" planned for fights from Boston to New York.
