= Wing walking =

Aerial barnstorming daredevil stunt

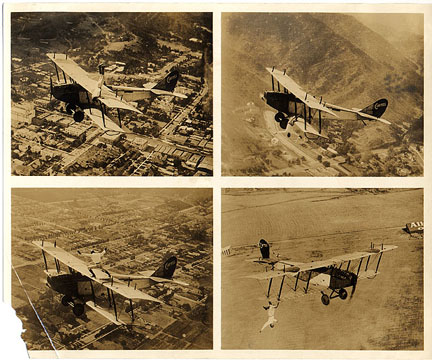
Locklear with his Curtiss JN-4D, c. 1919–1920

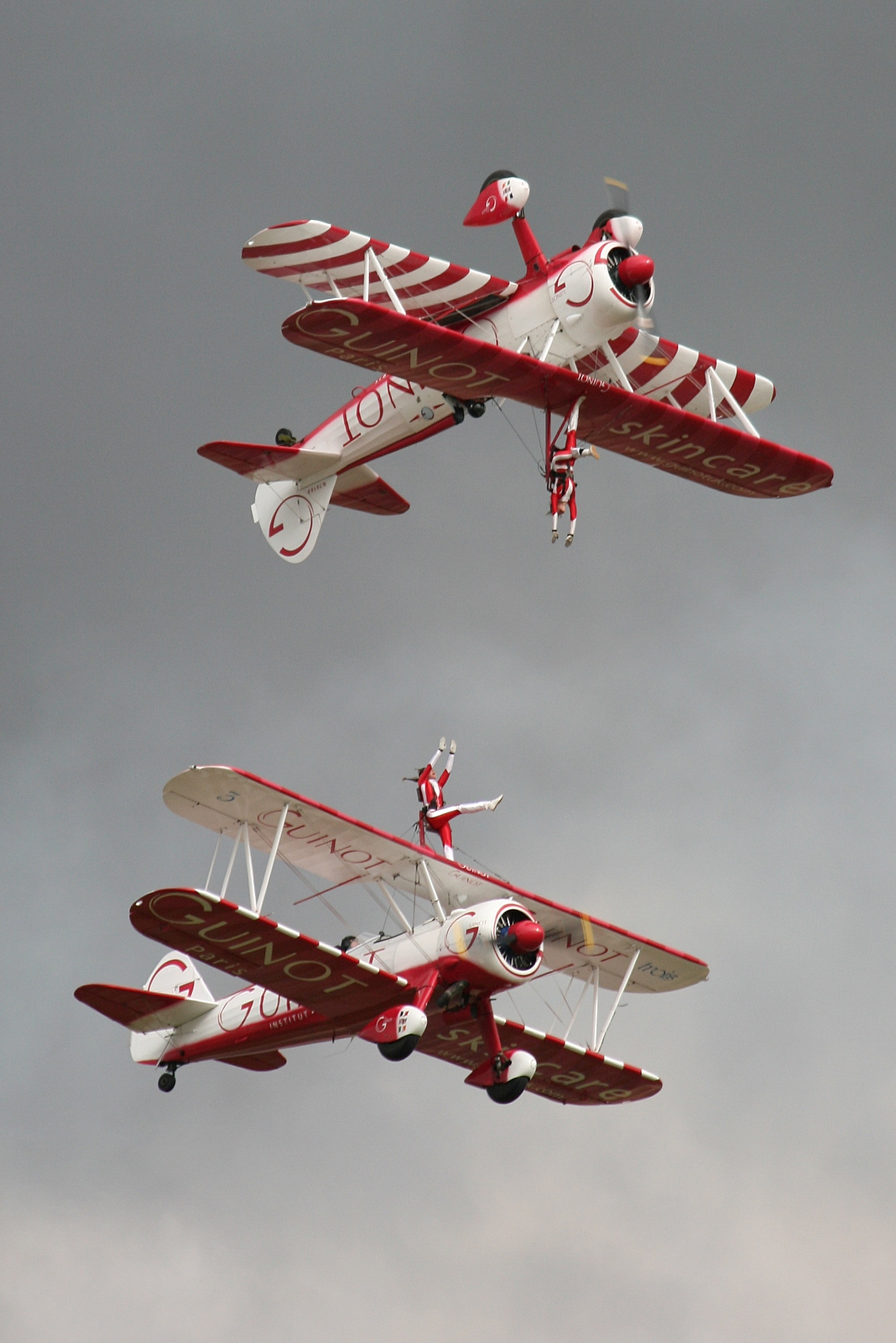
Team Guinot at the 2008 'Flying Legends' air show in Duxford, UK

Wing walking is the act of moving along the wings of an aeroplane (most commonly a biplane) during flight, sometimes transferring between planes. It originated as a daredevil stunt in the aerial barnstorming shows of the 1920s, and became the subject of several Hollywood movies. An early exponent was Ormer Locklear, who was killed performing a dive on film. Charles Lindbergh began his aviation career as a wing walker.

== Early development ==
The earliest known instance of standing on the wing of a powered aircraft was an experimental flight in England involving a biplane built by Colonel Samuel Franklin Cody on 14 January 1911. At Laffan's Plain, Cody took his two stepsons for a flight, with them standing on the lower wing. In August 1913, Commandant Felix locked the controls of his "Nieuport-Dunne" biplane over France and climbed out along the lower wing, leaving the plane to fly itself.

An early wing walker who performed daring stunts was American Ormer Locklear. In November 1918, Locklear performed at Barron Field, Texas, with the first public performance of his daredevil wing-walking stunts. Wing walking was seen as an extreme form of barnstorming, and wing walkers would regularly take up the challenge of outdoing one another. They admitted (or rather proclaimed proudly) that the point of their trade was to make money on the audience's prospect of seeing someone risk death.

Among the many aerialists to become popular were Tiny Broderick, Gladys Ingle, Eddie Angel, Virginia Angel, Mayme Carson, Clyde Pangborn, Lillian Boyer, Jack Shack, Al Wilson, Fronty Nichols, Spider Matlock, Gladys Roy, Ivan Unger, Jessie Woods, Bonnie Rowe, Charles Lindbergh, and Mabel Cody (niece of Buffalo Bill Cody, no relation to S.F. Cody).

Eight wing walkers died in a relatively short period during the infancy of wing walking.

Variations on wing walking became common, with such stunts as doing handstands, hanging by one's teeth, and transferring from one plane to another. A 1931 article on wing-walking on inverted aircraft touted the practical aspect of performing inflight landing-gear inspection or maintenance. Eventually wing walkers began making transfers between a ground vehicle, such as a car, a boat, or a train, to the plane. Other variations included free-falls ending with a last-minute parachute opening.

Charles Lindbergh, whose career in flight began with wing walking, was well known for stunts involving parachutes. The first African-American woman granted an international pilot license, Bessie Coleman, also engaged in stunts using parachutes. Another successful woman in this profession was Lillian Boyer, who performed hundreds of wing-walking exhibitions, automobile-to-plane changes, and parachute jumps.

Eighteen-year-old Elrey Borge Jeppesen, known today for having developed air navigation manuals and charts, joined Tex Rankin's Flying Circus around 1925; one of his jobs was wing walking.

When the stock market crash of 1929 occurred, many prominent flying circuses such as the Gates Flying Circus folded.

In 1936, the practice effectively ended in the United States when the U.S. government banned wing walking below 1,500 feet (460 m). People had difficulty seeing stunts above that height.

== Modern practice ==
In the 1970s, stunt men and women had restrictions that included being attached to the upper wing center section. Wing walking continues to be practiced by various performers.

On November 14, 1981, in an event organized by Martin Caidin, nineteen skydivers set an unofficial wing-walking world record by standing on the left wing of a Junkers Ju 52 aircraft in flight.

In 2000, Indian actor Akshay Kumar performed a wing-walking stunt for the film Khiladi 420.

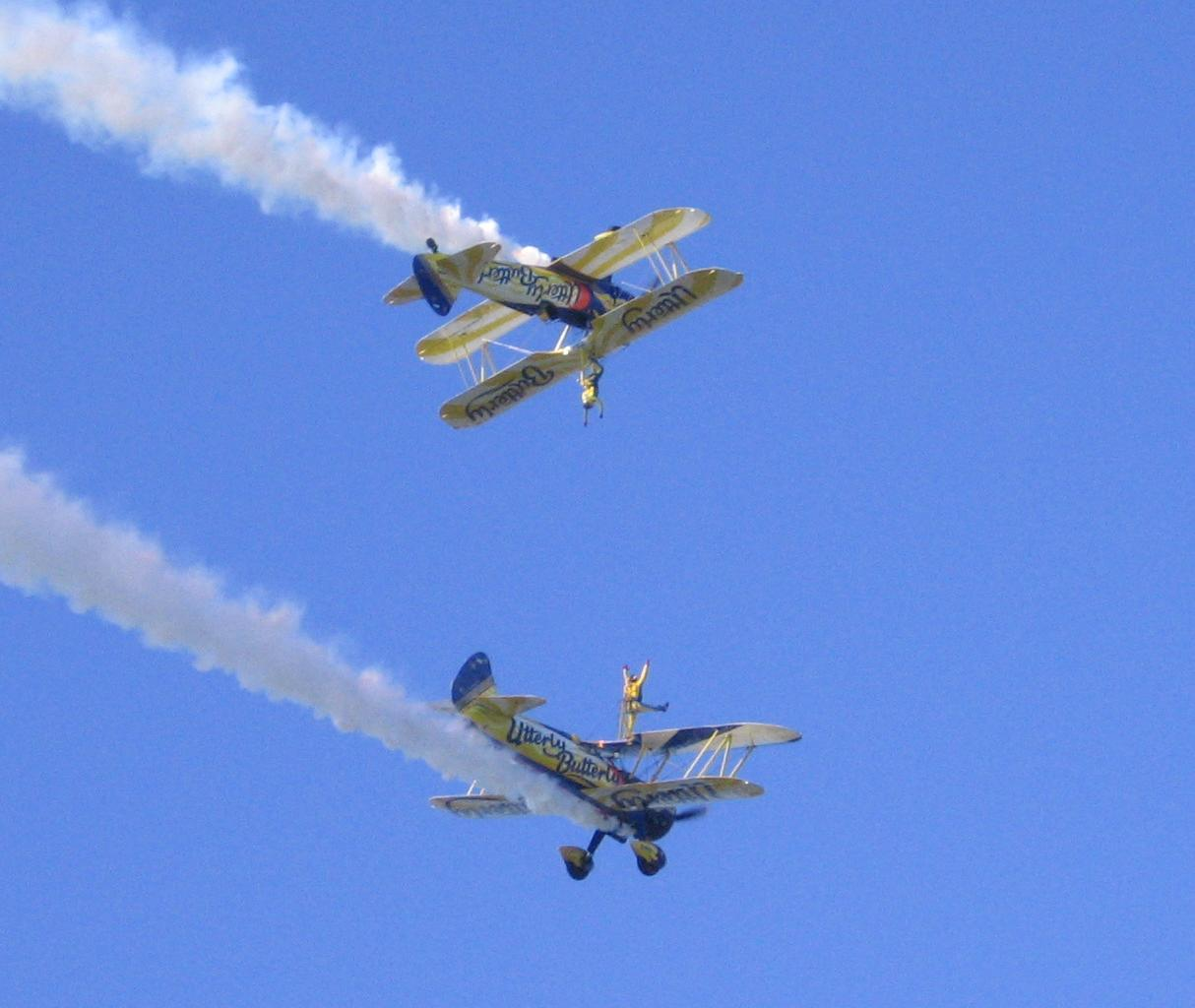
The UK Utterly Butterly display team perform wing walking with their Boeing Stearmans in 2006.

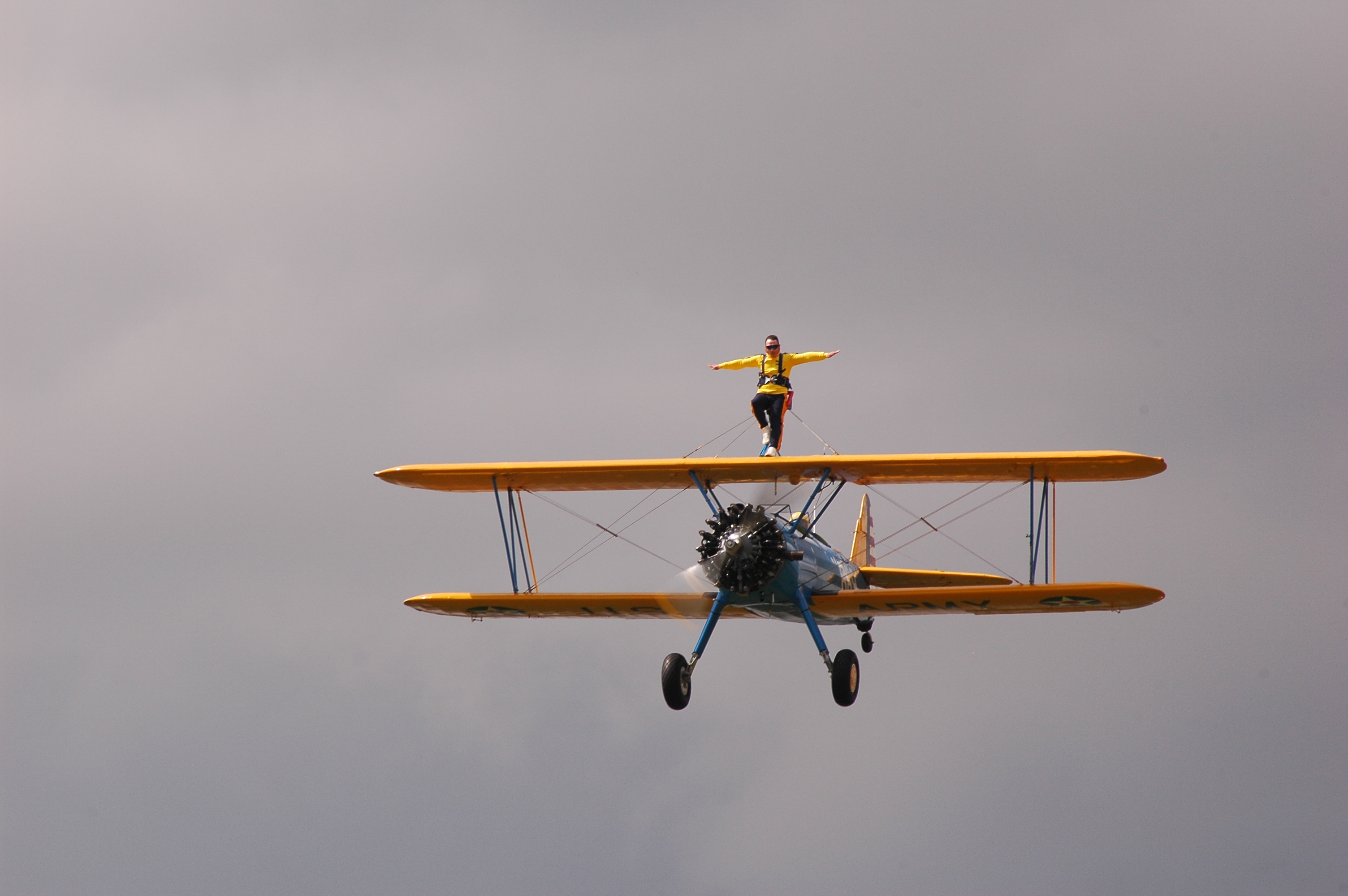
Stuntman John Thomas performing wing walking

Two wing walkers during an air show

== See also ==
- Aerobatic maneuver
- Aerobatics
