= National Aviation Academy =

American technical school focused on aviation maintenance

Coordinates: 27°53′41.3″N 82°43′16.5″W

- Motto: Training Aviation Maintenance Technicians
- Type: Private for-profit technical school
- Campus: Urban
- Website: www.naa.edu

National Aviation Academy (NAA) is a private for-profit technical school focused on aviation maintenance with campuses in Concord, Massachusetts and Clearwater, Florida.

== Locations ==
NAA's Tampa Bay campus is in Clearwater, Florida, and functions as the main headquarters and teaching center. The shop/lab training hangar is at the St. Pete–Clearwater International Airport.

NAA's New England campus is in Concord, Massachusetts, and houses classrooms, offices and lab spaces for training. The training hangar is at Minute Man Air Field in Stow, Massachusetts. National Aviation Academy of New England is accredited by the Accrediting Commission of Career Schools and Colleges.
