= Standard J =

Biplane trainer aircraft produced 1916-1918

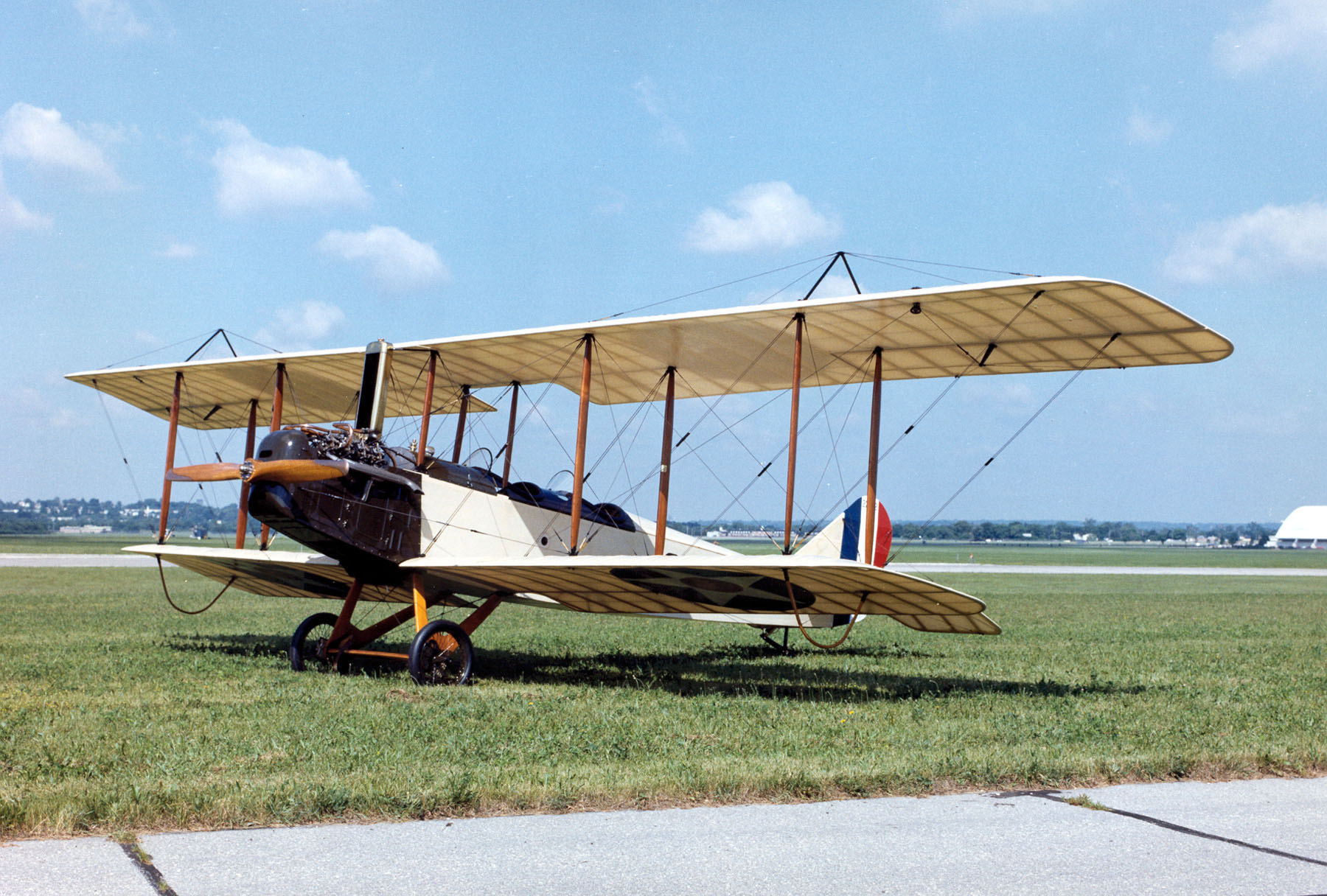

General information
- Type: Trainer
- National origin: United States
- Manufacturer: Standard Aircraft Corporation
- Designer: Charles Healy Day
- Number built: 1,600+

History
- First flight: 1916
- Developed from: Sloan H series

The Standard J is a two-seat basic trainer two-bay biplane produced in the United States from 1916 to 1918, powered by a four-cylinder inline Hall-Scott A-7a engine. It was constructed from wood with wire bracing and fabric covering. The J-1 was built as a stopgap to supplement the Curtiss JN-4 in production.

== Development ==
Charles Healy Day had designed the preceding Sloan H series of aircraft, and continued the line under the Standard Aero Corporation (later Standard Aircraft Corporation). Four companies, Standard, Dayton-Wright, Fisher Body, and Wright-Martin, delivered 1,601 J-1s between June 1917 and June 1918. The Standard J-1 can be differentiated from the Curtiss JN series by its slightly swept-back wing planform, triangular king posts above the upper wings, and the front legs of the landing gear which were mounted behind the lower wing's leading edge, just about where the forward wing spar of the lower wing panel attaches to the fuselage.

== Operational history ==
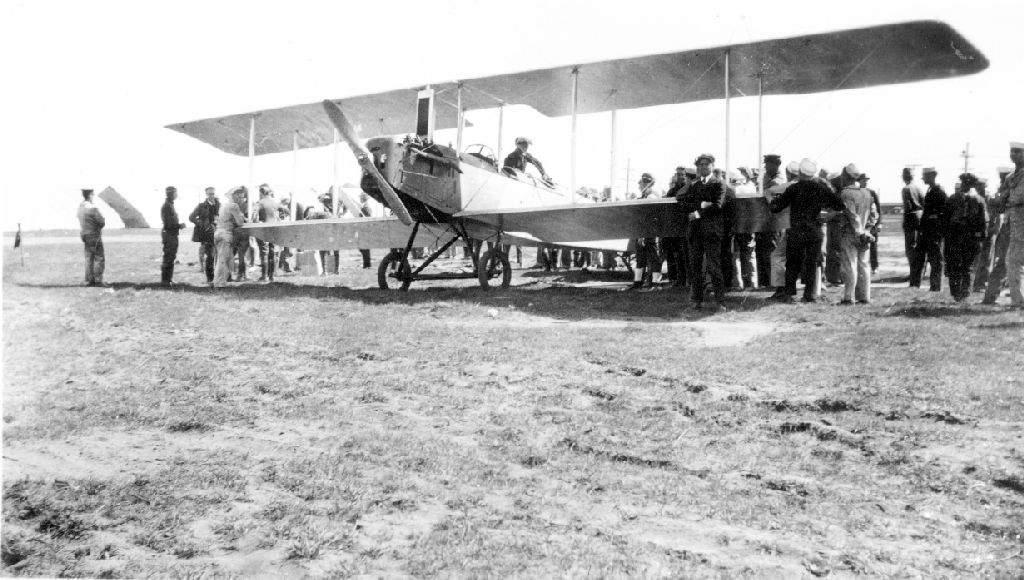
Standard J-1 providing joyrides.

Although produced in large numbers, its four-cylinder Hall-Scott A-7a engine was unreliable and vibrated badly. While JN-4 production outnumbered J-1s by about two to one in June 1918, fatalities in JN-4s versus J-1s numbered about seven to one due to the limited use of the J-1s. Few later production J-1s left their delivery crates.

In June 1918, all Standard J-1s were grounded, although training remained intensive. Sufficient JN-4s were available to meet training needs, and at $2,000 per aircraft it was not cost-effective to convert them to use Curtiss OX-5 engines. Contracts for 2,600+ JS-1s were canceled, and those not used for ground instruction by the US Army were sold as surplus or scrapped. Curtiss, which produced its competitor (the Curtiss JN) bought surplus J-1s which they modified with different powerplants, for resale.

In January. 1919 on the 1920 fiscal year Army Appropriation Bill hearings, it was described as:

We have no machine that is obsolete with the exception of the Standard J-1, which was discussed this morning. That plane would have never been built in this country for training purposes had it not been for the fact that we could not get enough Curtiss machines, that is the JN machine. The fact is that we knew the machinewas not a good machine, but it served its purpose, and we did a lot of training with that machine, but it became dangerous; it was over-surfaced. Then the four cylinder Hall-Scott motor vibrated so badly that the machine never worked satisfactorily. It was underpowered... we built it knowing that it was not satisfactory, but it was the only way we could get machines in use. It was put in storage, finally, because we had plenty of the Curtiss machines at that time.

— Colonel Bane, Head of Engineering Division, Air Service,

Many J-1s were flown by civilian flying schools, and for joy-riding and barnstorming operations, until they were worn out, or were forced into retirement by new air transport legislation in 1927 which banned passenger aircraft with wood structures due to a number of high-profile accidents.

== Variants ==
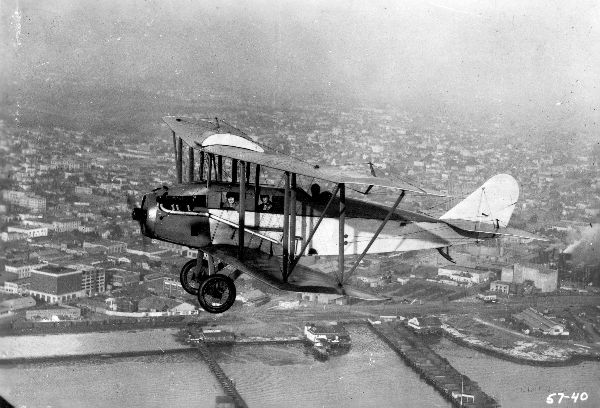
Standard J, modified with an enclosed cabin by T. Claude Ryan, in flight over San Diego

- Sloan H series: trainers and reconnaissance aircraft from 1913
- Standard H series: production by Standard of Sloan H-series
- Standard J: first Standard-designed variant
- Standard J-1: trainer for U.S. Army
- Standard SJ-1: J-1 with additional pair of forward wheels to prevent noseovers
- Standard JR-1: advanced trainer for US Army
- Standard JR-1B: mail carrier for US Post Office, modification of JR-1
- Standard E-4: redesignated JR-1B mailcarrier

=== War-surplus conversions ===
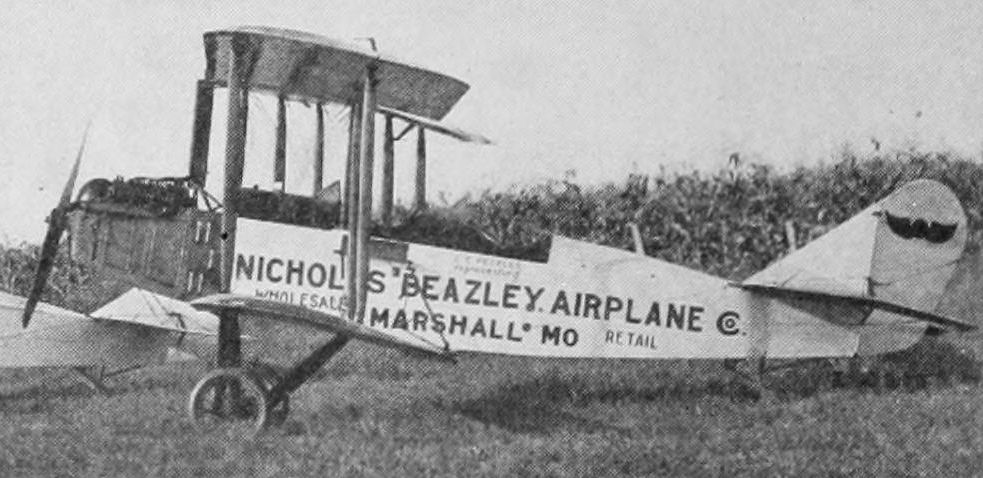
Nicholas-Beazley Standard photo from Aero Digest September 1926

- Aerial Engineering Corporation Standard 6W-3: Modification for a pilot and four passengers. Also known as the Mercury Standard 6
- Curtiss Night Mail: 1922 mailplane conversion of J-1 by Curtiss with new wings (about 6 converted)
- Lincoln Standard L.S.5: J-1 modified with an open cockpit for four passengers
- Nicholas-Beazley-Standard: J-1 aircraft modified by Nicholas-Beazley
- Ryan Standard: J-1 with a 180 hp Hispano Suiza engine and an enclosed cabin for four passengers fitted by the Ryan Flying Company (9 converted)
- Sikorsky Standard: civil trainer with Sikorsky-Gluhareff Parasol wing (also known as Standard SJ)
- Super Rhone Standard: Conversion of the original aircraft to take a 120 hp (89 kW) Super Rhone air-cooled radial engine. The first of these converted aircraft was used as a crop duster in Texas during 1925.

== Operators ==
United States

- United States Army Air Service
- United States Navy
- United States Post Office Department
- The San Diego—Los Angeles Airlines

== Surviving aircraft ==
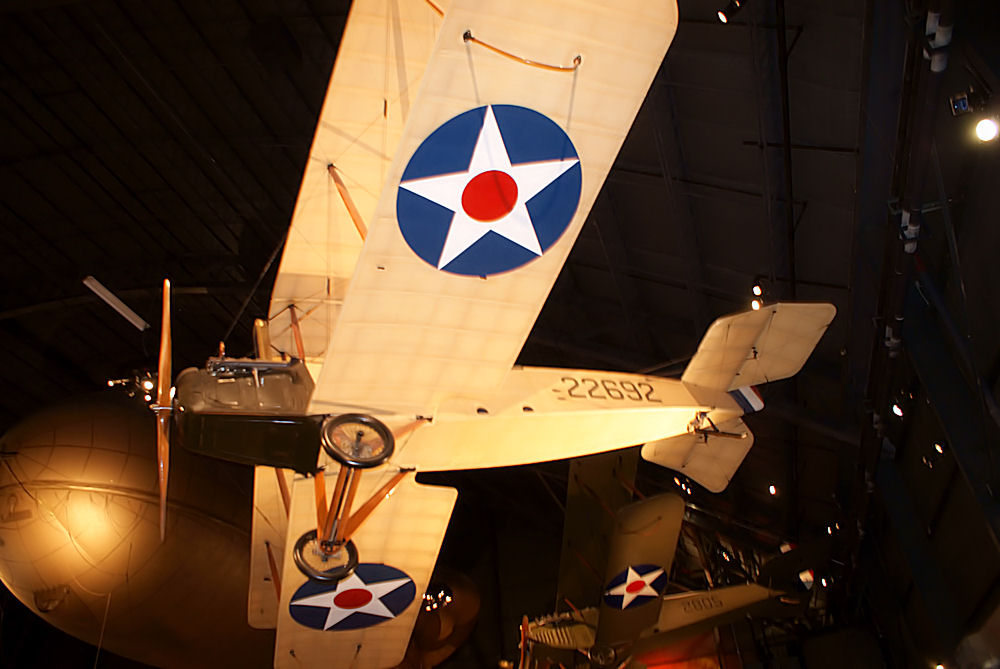
Standard J-1 at the USAF Museum, showing the wing sweepback

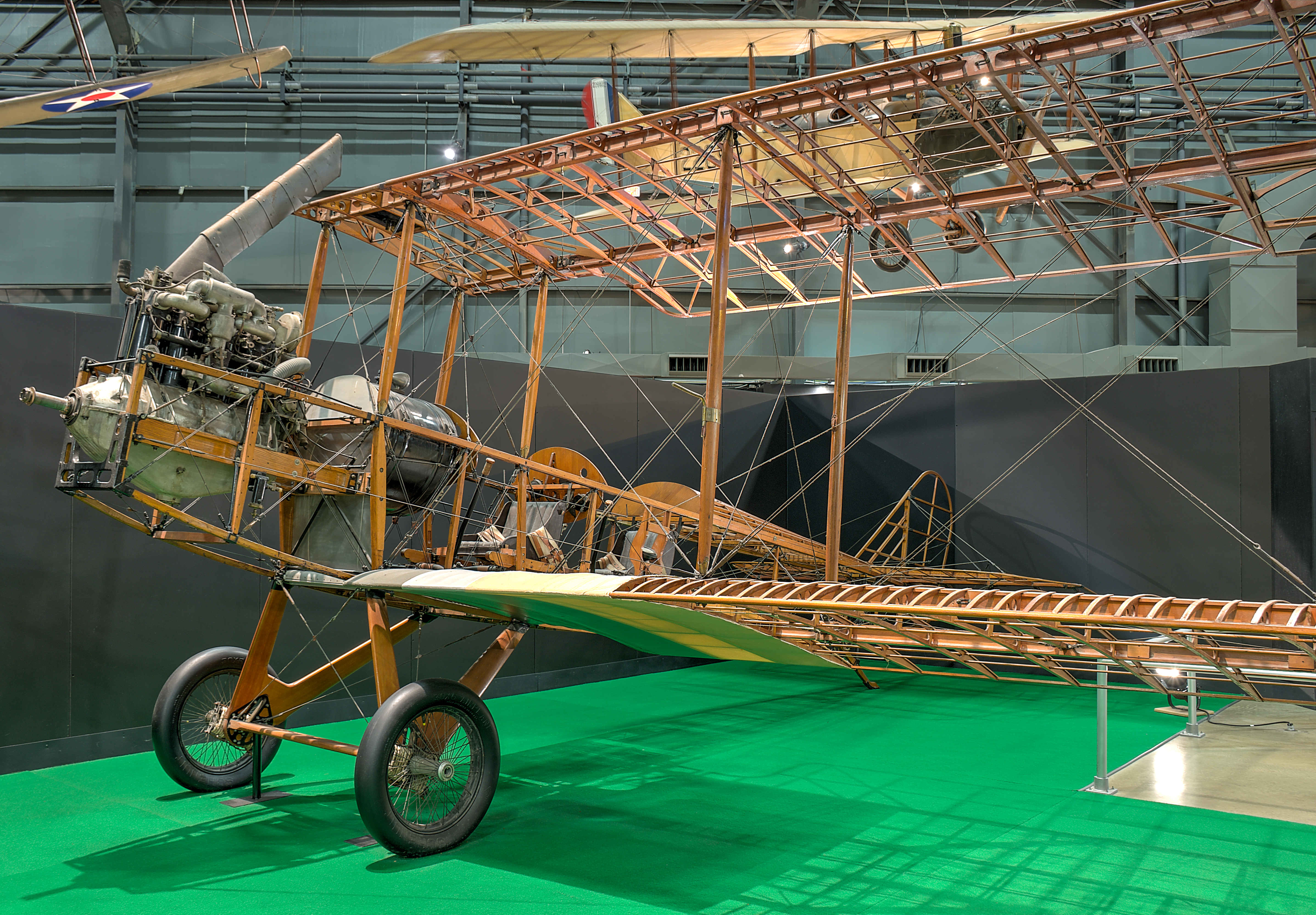
Standard J-1 (fabric covering removed) at the USAF Museum

Over a dozen J-1s are on display or being restored. Others projects are incomplete and awaiting restoration.

- 214 – J-1 on static display at the Yanks Air Museum in Chino, California.
- 581 – J-1 airworthy at the Owls Head Transportation Museum in Owls Head, Maine. It has a Hispano-Suiza V-8 engine installed.
- 1000 – J-1 airworthy with James F. Hammond of Yellow Springs, Ohio.
- 1141 – J-1 on static display at the National Museum of the United States Air Force in Dayton, Ohio. It is displayed without a right wing or fabric covering, has a Hall-Scott A-4A engine installed, and was donated by Robert Greiger in December 1962.
- 1582 – J-1 in storage at the Fantasy of Flight in Polk City, Florida. It is composite of two airframes.
- 1598 – J-1 on static display at the San Diego Aerospace Museum in San Diego, California.
- 1956 – J-1 airworthy at the EAA Aviation Museum in Oshkosh, Wisconsin. It has a Hispano-Suiza Model A engine installed.
- 2434 – J-1 on display at the Fargo Air Museum in Fargo, North Dakota. It is on loan from Bonanzaville, U.S.A. It has an OXX-6 engine installed.
- 2969 – J-1 airworthy with Walter C. Bowe of Sonoma, California. It is assembled from original components as a period kit.
- 41236 – J-1 on static display at the Glenn H. Curtiss Museum in Hammondsport, New York. It is on loan from the Henry Ford Museum.
- T-4595 – J-1 at the Historic Aircraft Restoration Museum in Creve Coeur, Missouri.
- T-4598 – J-1 airworthy with the Freeman Heritage Collection in Kingsbury, Texas.
- T-4732 – J-1 airworthy with C C Air Corp of Port Hueneme, California.
- J-1 on static display at the National Museum of the United States Air Force in Dayton, Ohio. It has an OXX-6 engine installed.
- J-1 on display at the National Aviation Museum of Korea

== Specifications (SJ) ==
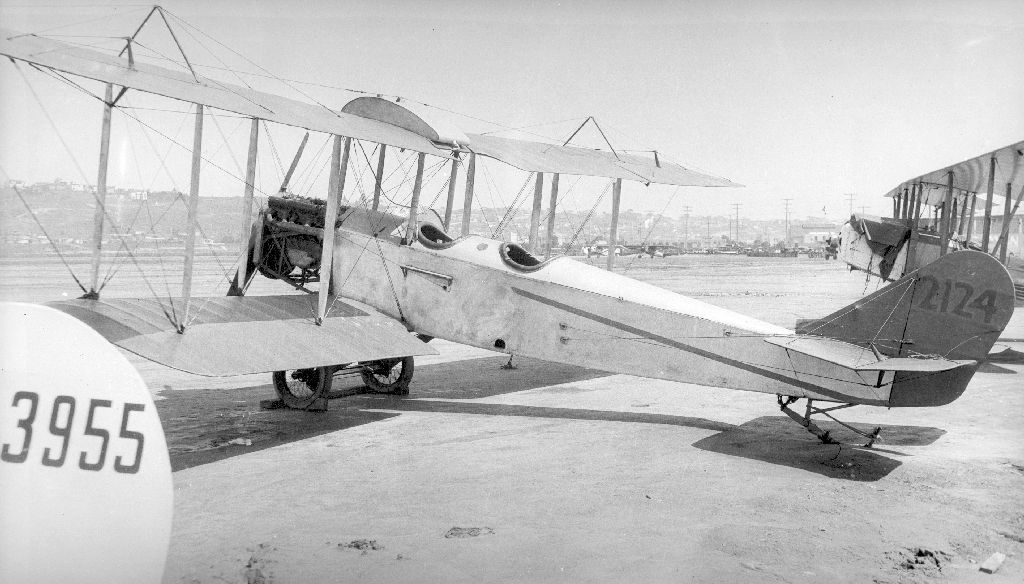
Standard J-1 with Hispano-Suiza engine

Data from The Standard Aero Corporation Model J Training Tractor

General characteristics

- Crew: 2
- Length: 26 ft 7 in (8.10 m)
- Upper wingspan: 43 ft 11 in (13.39 m)
- Lower wingspan: 32 ft (9.8 m)
- Height: 10 ft 10 in (3.30 m)
- Wing area: 429 sq ft (39.9 m^{2})
- Airfoil: R.A.F No 3
- Empty weight: 1,350 lb (612 kg)
- Gross weight: 1,950 lb (885 kg)
- Fuel capacity: 31 US gal (26 imp gal; 120 L)
- Powerplant: 1 × Hall-Scott A-7 water-cooled straight-4 engine, 100 hp (75 kW)

Performance

- Maximum speed: 68 mph (109 km/h, 59 kn)
- Stall speed: 37 mph (60 km/h, 32 kn)
- Range: 350 mi (560 km, 300 nmi)
- Time to altitude: 10 minutes to 2,600 ft (790 m)

== See also ==
Aircraft of comparable role, configuration, and era

- Airco DH.4
- Airco DH.6
- Albatros C.III
- Avro 504
- Caudron G.III
- Martin TT
- Nieuport 83

Related lists

- List of military aircraft of the United States
