= Bevo =

Bevo may refer to:

- Bevo (drink), a non-alcoholic malt beverage brewed in the United States
- Bevo (mascot), University of Texas at Austin mascot
- Bevo HC, Dutch handball club
- JetAfrica Swaziland (callsign BEVO), see List of airline codes
- Beverly Hills, New South Wales, Australia; nicknamed "Bevo"
- Bevo Howard (1914–1971), U.S. aviator
- Bevo LeBourveau (1896–1947), U.S. baseball player
- Bevo Francis (1932–2015), U.S. basketball player
- Bevo Nordmann (1939–2015), U.S. basketball player
- Jon Bevo, keyboardist for God Street Wine
