= Dick Merrill =

American aviator and actor (1894–1982)

- Born: February 1, 1894; Iuka, Mississippi, US
- Died: October 31, 1982 (aged 88); Elsinore, California, US
- Occupations: Aviator; Actor
- Spouse: Toby Wing

Henry Tyndall "Dick" Merrill (February 1, 1894 – October 31, 1982) was an early aviation pioneer. Among his feats he was the highest-paid air mail pilot, flew the first round-trip transatlantic flight in 1936, was Dwight D. Eisenhower's personal pilot during the 1952 presidential elections, set several speed records, and would go on to be Eastern Air Lines' most experienced pilot with over 36,000 hours until his retirement in 1961. In total, Merrill flew over 45,000 hours as pilot in command, covering over eight million miles.

At a time when record-breaking pilots were treated as celebrities, pioneer aviators like Dick Merrill gained a unique status. His most famous flight was a 1936 round-trip transatlantic flight that has gone down in the annals of flight as the "Ping Pong Flight." The following year, Merrill also completed the first commercial trans-Atlantic flight.

== Early years ==
Born February 1, 1894, at Iuka, Mississippi, "Dick" Merrill was born into a family that prided itself as being descended from the famous frontier pioneer, Daniel Boone. Although his full name was Henry Tyndall, the name "Dick" was a childhood moniker that stuck with him for life. Brought up as a devout Catholic, he was a teetotaler in an age when the "hard-drinking", "fun-loving" aerial adventurer was seen as the norm. Considered very easy-going yet serious, his one foible, however, was that he was an inveterate gambler throughout his life.

Merrill had from an early age been intrigued by the exploits of the first flyers, and when he enlisted in World War I, he began learning to fly while stationed in France but returned home to work on the Illinois Central Railroad as a fireman.

== Flying career ==
Merrill began his aviation career in earnest when he purchased a war-surplus Curtiss JN-4 Jenny in Columbus, Georgia, in 1920 for $600, flying it at air shows through the 1920s briefly appearing with the Ivan Gates Air Circus in the mid-1920s. He eventually turned this into a career as an air mail pilot, flying the Richmond to Atlanta night route. By 1930, Merrill held the record for flying the longest cumulative distance and became the highest-paid airmail pilot, earning $13,000 in 1930 at ten cents per mile. Eddie Rickenbacker later called him the "best commercial pilot" in the United States. Unlike some of his peers, Merrill was a deliberate and careful pilot, so well regarded that many celebrities (his friend Walter Winchell and even General Eisenhower during his 1952 presidential campaign) specifically requested him as a personal pilot. Merrill always would chalk up his successful flights more to luck than skill.

A later compatriot, Merton Meade, related an anecdote that summed up Merrill's flying "luck." "Dick often said he'd rather be lucky than good. When Eddie Rickenbacker owned Eastern he always insisted on Dick flying the airplane whenever he had to travel. Dick always told this story: 'But Captain, you've got a hundred pilots on the line better than me.' 'I know, Merrill, but you're the luckiest son of a bitch I've got, and I'd rather fly behind a lucky pilot than a good one any day!' Typical self-effacing comment by Dick… I doubt there ever WAS a better airline pilot than Dick Merrill."

=== The "Ping Pong Flight" ===
He had planned his transatlantic flight for some time but was unable to finance it on his pay as an Eastern Air Lines (EAL) pilot. Things changed when he met millionaire singer Harry Richman, famed for Puttin' on the Ritz. After taking in the singer's show in Miami, Merrill "planted" the idea for a round-trip flight of the Atlantic. He brazenly declared that they "take the plane to Europe… then we'll gas her up and fly her back. It's never been done."

Richman, who had recently gained his pilot's license, had been able to secure a Vultee V-1A capable of making the flight. The aircraft, NC13770, had originally been built for Lieutenant Colonel George R. Hutchinson's proposed all-freight New York-London-Moscow airline, which never started up. Since then it had served a number of pilots in various record setting flights; in 1935 Jimmy Doolittle used the aircraft to make a record 11-hour-59-minute transcontinental flight, and six weeks later Leland Andrews repeated the flight, then used it to set a long-distance speed record between Los Angeles and Mexico City.

Merrill and Richman extensively modified the Vultee V-1A for the flight. Using Eastern Air Lines mechanics, Merrill had extra fuel tanks installed and a 1,000 hp (750 kW) Wright Cyclone with a two-blade constant-speed prop fitted. The most modern equipment was sought out including the Hooven Radio Direction Finder (licensed to Bendix). It was Richman's idea to fill empty spaces in the wings and fuselage with 41,000 ping pong balls, which it was hoped would allow the aircraft to float if it was forced down in the ocean.

After modifications were carried out, they took off for London on September 2, 1936. The two aviators were a "odd couple" with Richman flamboyant while Merrill was always the studied professional. In a later interview, Merill revealed a peculiar predilection to perfume. When flying, he usually had a vial of Surrender or Evening in Paris in his pocket, stealing an occasional sniff over the Atlantic.

When they were 600 miles (970 km) off the coast of England, the pair ran into bad weather and eventually decided to put down in Llandilo (now spelled Llandeilo), Wales, about 175 miles (282 km) west of London. The flight took 18 hours and 36 minutes, the fastest Atlantic crossing to date. The next day Merrill and Richman completed their flight to London. While in England, Richman, ever the showman, christened the Vultee, the Lady Peace.

On September 14, they began the return flight from Southport, England. During the flight, while bucking headwinds, Richman decided to dump 500 gallons of fuel, leaving them with insufficient fuel to make New York City. Furious that Richman had panicked, Merrill was forced to put down on a soft bog at Musgrave Harbour in the Dominion of Newfoundland. After minor repairs and refueling, a week later they landed in New York. The usually easy-going relationship between the two pilots had been strained but they ended up as friends again.

The round-trip flight cost Richman $360,000, and is known in aviation history as the "Ping Pong Flight." Richman sold autographed ping pong balls from the flight for years after.

== Other flights ==
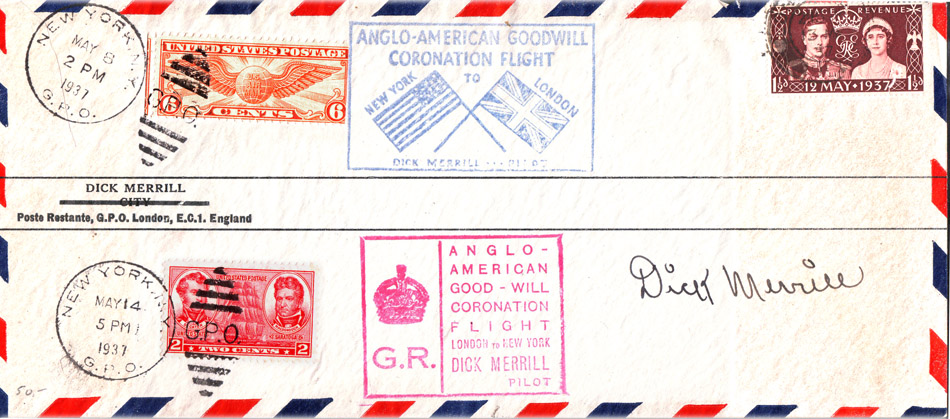
Cover flown by Dick Merrill on the Anglo-American Goodwill Coronation Flight, May 8–14, 1937

In 1937 Merrill was hired by Hearst Publishing to repeat the flight (co-piloted by 27-year-old Jack Lambie) in a Lockheed Model 10E Electra dubbed Daily Express. The flight from New York to London May 8–14, 1937, known as The "Anglo-American Goodwill Coronation Flight", was also recognized as the first commercial transatlantic round trip flight. Hearst wanted to scoop other American newspapers by acquiring photos of the May 10, 1937, coronation of King George VI after the abdication of his brother, King Edward VIII. Merrill carried photos (not newsreels, as often claimed) of the Hindenburg disaster, which occurred shortly before the flight. Hearst papers on both sides of the Atlantic published the first pictures of each event, and Merrill earned the Harmon Trophy for 1937 for his achievement. Footage from this flight was used to make the 1937 Monogram movie, Atlantic Flight.

Both Dick Merrill and Jack Lambie, his real-life "Coronation Flight" co-pilot and co-star in the film, received $2,500 for their roles in this movie. Dick had not taken the filming seriously but gladly accepted the windfall. Ever the inveterate gambler, Merrill blew his entire salary at Santa Anita the weekend after shooting wrapped.

Merrill made two more transatlantic flights, the last of these, on May 14, 1937, set the new record at 24 hours, 25 seconds.

== Private life ==
Now famous, Merrill thoroughly enjoyed his celebrity and loved the nightlife and hobnobbed with both the famous and infamous. Although earning a good salary, he habitually was broke due to gambling. He had become a fixture at the parties of the rich and famous, and it was at one of these that he met Toby Wing, a chorus girl who became a movie star, appearing in 52 features and shorts. The two married in Tijuana in 1938, but her parents objected to this sort of marriage, so they were married a second time at the home of Sidney Shannon, an early Eastern Air Lines investor. His marriage finally turned around his financial woes and he became devoted to his new wife. Merrill was 22 years Wing's senior, and shortly after their marriage she met Bob Hope who joked, "Toby it's nice to see you and I'm glad to see you brought your father along." According to Wing, Merrill never forgave Hope for the insult.

After a Broadway run, Toby retired from show business the next year, and the couple moved to Miami, where Merrill flew the Eastern Air Lines Miami to New York runs with occasional flights to South America.

== World War II ==
Merrill was too old to be commissioned during World War II, and instead signed on as a civilian pilot and flew the China-Burma-India (CBI) "Hump" in DC-3/C-47 Skytrains and C-46 Commandos. "Flying the Hump" (over the Himalaya Mountains) to transport desperately needed supplies to troops in China from bases in India and Burma, was extremely dangerous. CBI crews faced severe adverse conditions at "the top of the world" coupled with unpredictable weather, lack of radio aids/direction finders and Japanese fighter opposition. On the ground, engineering and maintenance nightmares resulted due to a shortage of trained air and ground personnel and poorly equipped airfields that were often wiped out by monsoon rains.

== Later life ==
He returned to Eastern Air Lines after the war, becoming a senior pilot with the airline. In 1948, at 10,000 ft (3,000 m) off the Florida coast, Merrill's calm and skillful management of an in-flight emergency was evident when a propeller on an EAL Constellation tore through the fuselage and killed a steward instantly. Merrill was credited with saving the lives of 69 people on board. In 1953, he piloted an Eastern Airlines Super Constellation in an aviation promotional movie called Flying with Arthur Godfrey, with Godfrey as narrator. He would officially retire from Eastern Air Lines on October 3, 1961, after flying a Douglas DC-8 from New York to Miami. At retirement, he reputedly had flown the longest cumulative distance of any pilot in commercial aviation history, and ranked as the second most senior pilot with the airline after 36,650 hours flown over a period of 33 years.

Merrill continued flying for pleasure into his 80s, setting several additional records. In 1966 he flew his actor friend Arthur Godfrey in an around-the-world flight, set a speed record delivering a Lockheed L-1011 from California to Miami at an average 710 mph (1,140 km/h) ground speed in 1978, and flew the Concorde on one occasion. In 1970, he was awarded the FAI Gold Air Medal.

After retirement from active flying, Merrill managed the Shannon Air Museum in Fredericksburg, Virginia until his death in 1982. He is buried at Christ Church Kingston Parish Cemetery, Mathews, Virginia.

Wing would spend the remainder of her life actively promoting her husband's place in the annals of aviation history.

== See also ==
- Virginia Aviation Museum
- Eastern Air Lines
