= Standard E-1 =

1917 American fighter aircraft model

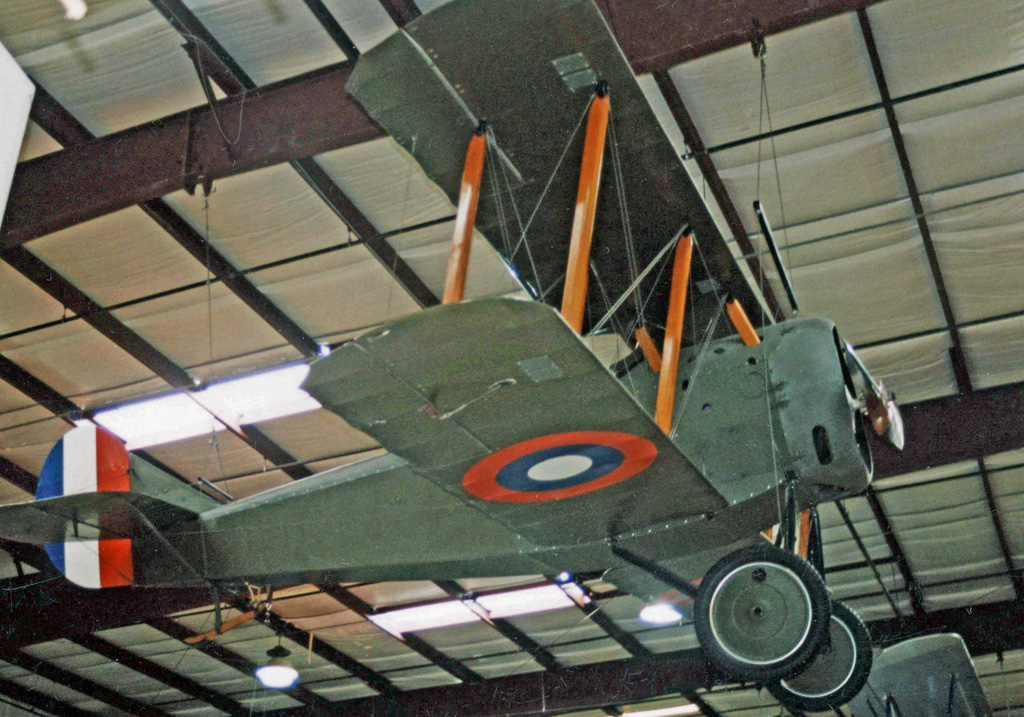
- Standard E-1 of 1919 displayed in the Virginia Aviation Museum at Richmond, Virginia in USAAS markings

General information
- Type: Military trainer
- National origin: United States of America
- Manufacturer: Standard Aircraft Corporation
- Primary user: United States Army Air Service
- Number built: 168

History
- First flight: 1917

The Standard E-1 was an early American Army fighter aircraft, tested in 1917. It was the only pursuit aircraft manufactured by the United States during World War I. It arrived late in World War I, and as a result saw more use in the months following the Armistice than those preceding it.

== Design and development ==
Built by the Standard Aircraft Corporation, the E-1 was an open-cockpit single-place tractor biplane, powered by an 80 hp (60 kW) Le Rhône or 100 hp (75 kW) Gnome rotary engine.

== Operational history ==
It proved unsuitable as a fighter, but 128 were bought as an advanced trainer. Of these, 30 were powered by the Gnome rotary engine of 100 horsepower and 98 were powered by the LeRhone C-9 rotary engine of 80 horsepower. After World War I, three were modified as RPVs.

== Operators ==
United States

- United States Army Air Service
- United States Navy - 10 aircraft received from the Army (A-4218 to A-4227)

== Surviving aircraft ==
- A late 1918 E-1 was on display at the National Museum of the United States Air Force in Dayton, Ohio for over 40 years. It was placed on indefinite loan to the Museum by J. B. Petty of Gastonia, North Carolina in 1959. After Mr. Petty passed on, the aircraft was sold at auction by his estate and eventually was obtained by Kermit Weeks and is now part of the collection at Fantasy of Flight in Polk City, Florida.
- A 1918 E-1 is on display at the Shannon Air Museum in Fredericksburg, Virginia. This airframe was found at a florist shop in Dayton, Ohio in the 1950s and restored for display.

== Specifications ==
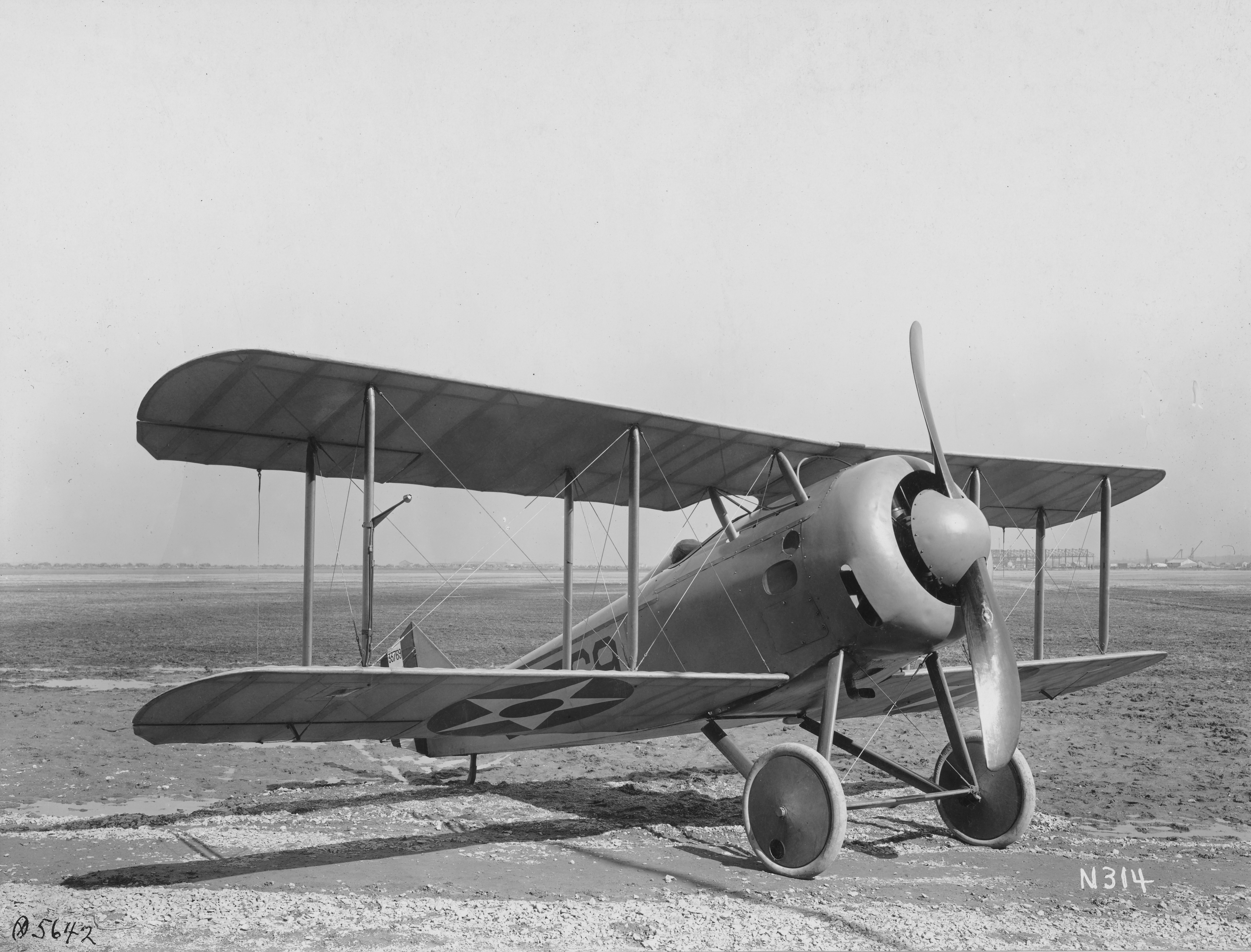
1918 photo of Standard E-1 serial number 33769

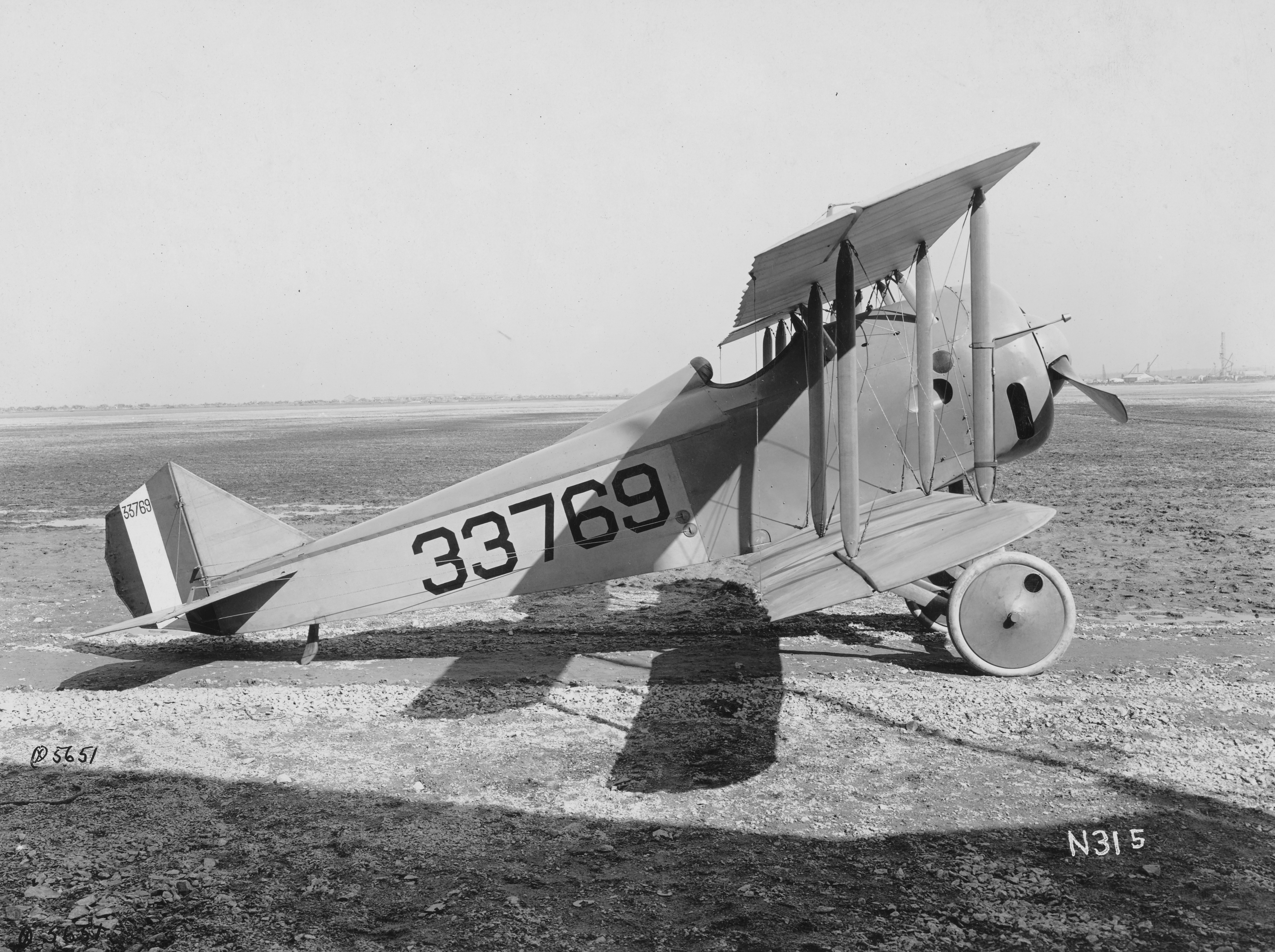
1918 photo of Standard E-1 serial number 33769

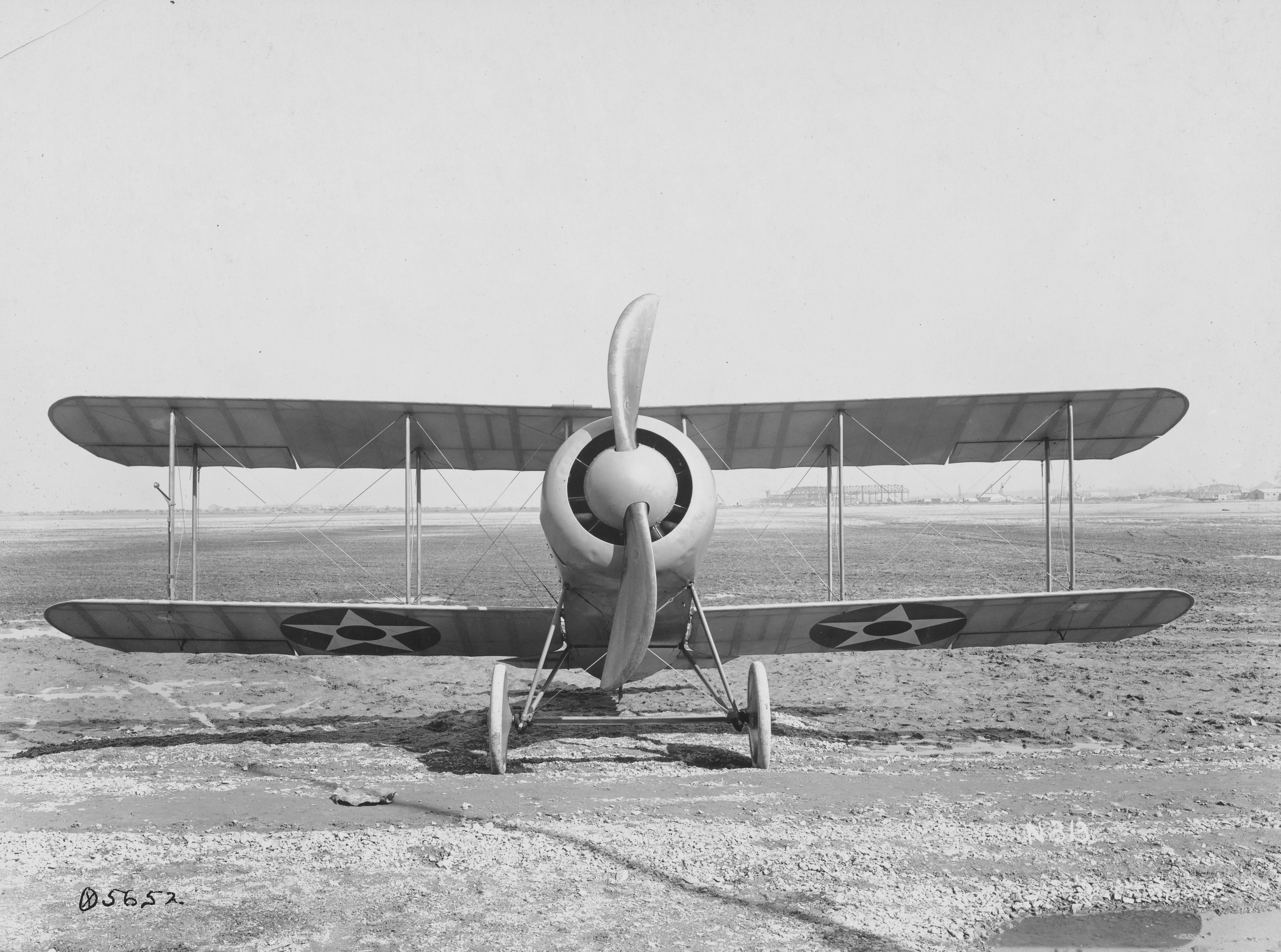
1918 photo of Standard E-1 serial number 33769

Data from The American Fighter

General characteristics

- Crew: One pilot
- Length: 18 ft 11 in (5.76 m)
- Wingspan: 24 ft 0 in (7.31 m)
- Height: 7 ft 10 in (2.38 m)
- Wing area: 153 sq ft (14.21 m^{2})
- Empty weight: 380 lb (838 kg)
- Gross weight: 1,140 lb (519 kg)
- Powerplant: 1 × Le Rhône rotary , 80 hp (60 kW)

Performance

- Maximum speed: 100 mph (160 km/h, 87 kn)
- Endurance: 2 hours
- Service ceiling: 14,800 ft (4,510 m)

== See also ==
Aircraft of comparable role, configuration, and era

- Thomas-Morse S-4

Related lists

- List of military aircraft of the United States
