= Standard Aircraft Corporation =

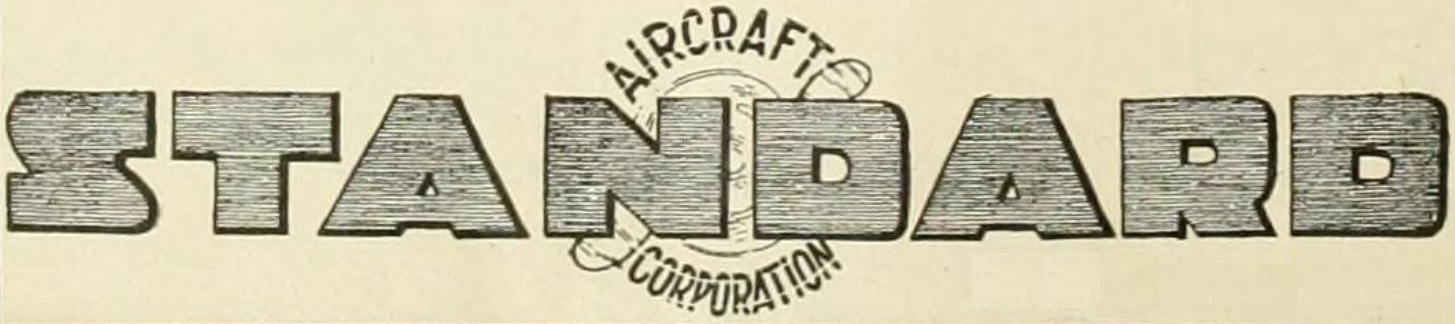

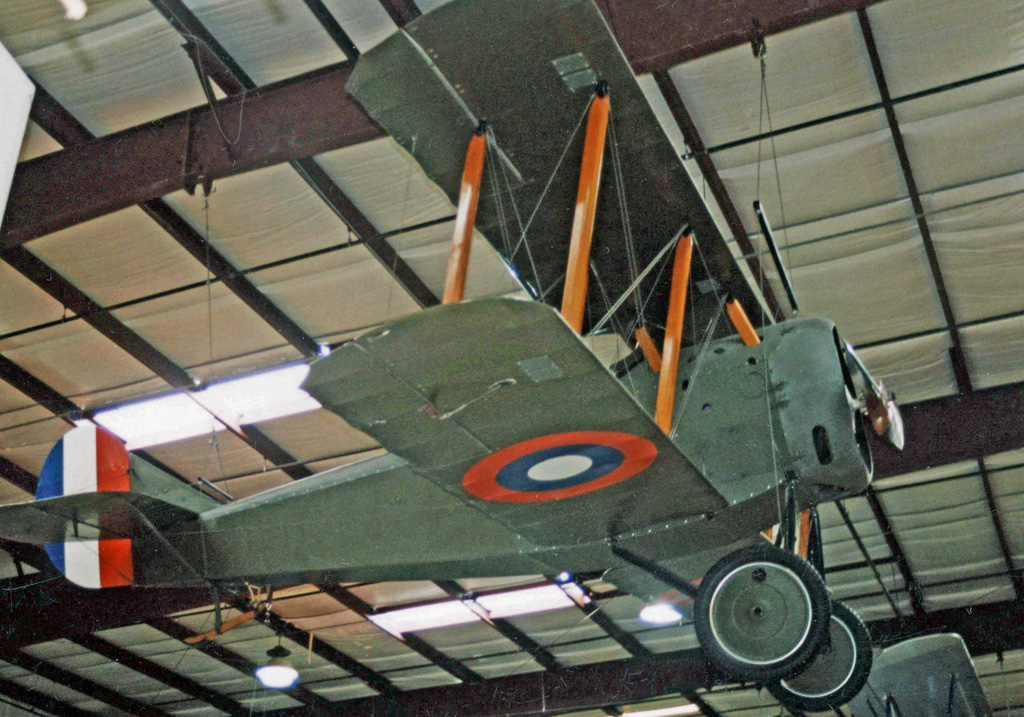
- Standard E-1 advanced training biplane of 1919 displayed at the Virginia Aviation Museum in USAAS markings
- Industry: Aerospace
- Founded: 1916
- Successor: New Standard Aircraft Company (Gates-Day Aircraft Company)
- Headquarters: Plainfield, New Jersey, United States

The Standard Aircraft Corporation was an American aircraft manufacturer, founded in Plainfield, New Jersey, in 1916.

Standard Aircraft anticipated American entry into World War I, despite an expressed policy of isolationism. The same year it was founded, Standard Aircraft became a very early supplier of aircraft to the U.S. Army Signal Corps (perhaps fifth or sixth ever).

The corporation supplied the Sloane H as the Standard H-2 and H-3 to the Army, and the float-equipped H-4H to the Navy, after the Sloane company was reorganised as the Standard Aircraft Co.

A more significant type was the Standard J series trainer, similar to the Curtiss JN-4, which began with the SJ prototype, followed by the production J-1 (or SJ-1), of which some 800 were built. They were badly hampered by the choice of engine, and attempts to cure the problems with subsequent designs were not successful. Only handfuls of JRs and JR-1Bs were built; some were also purchased by the Post Office.

Standard's last type was the E-1. Intended as a fighter, 100 served as advanced trainers, about half with a provision for fitting machineguns, as the M-Defense.

In 1918 the corporation had a large factory and airfield at Bayway, near the Elizabeth and Linden boundary. It was here that they assembled and tested 107 Handley Page O/400 bombers during 1918, mostly for shipment to Britain. They were powered by Liberty L-12 engines. A plan to fly them across the Atlantic was abandoned, and a further contract for 1,000 more O/400s was cancelled with the end of World War I.

Designer Charles Healy Day later teamed with barnstormer/showman Ivan Gates to design and build aircraft specifically for the civilian and military markets. They formed the Gates-Day Aircraft Company (later renamed the New Standard Aircraft Company) in 1927, and built a number of different aircraft—including the Gates-Day D-24 and the New Standard D-25.
