= National Aviation Museum of Korea =

- Location within South Korea
- Established: 2022
- Location: Gimpo, South Korea
- Coordinates: 37.557°N 126.809°E
- Type: Aviation museum
- Website: www.aviation.or.kr

The National Aviation Museum of Museum (Korean: 국립항공박물관) is an aerospace museum in Gimpo, South Korea.

== Aircraft on display ==
- Standard J-1
- North American LT-6G Mosquito
- North American F-51 Mustang
- North American F-86F Sabre
- KAI KC-100 Naraon
- KAI T-50 Golden Eagle
- KLA-100
- Bandi Ho
- TR-100
- Boeing 747 (cross section)
