= Lincoln Standard L.S.5 =

L.S.5
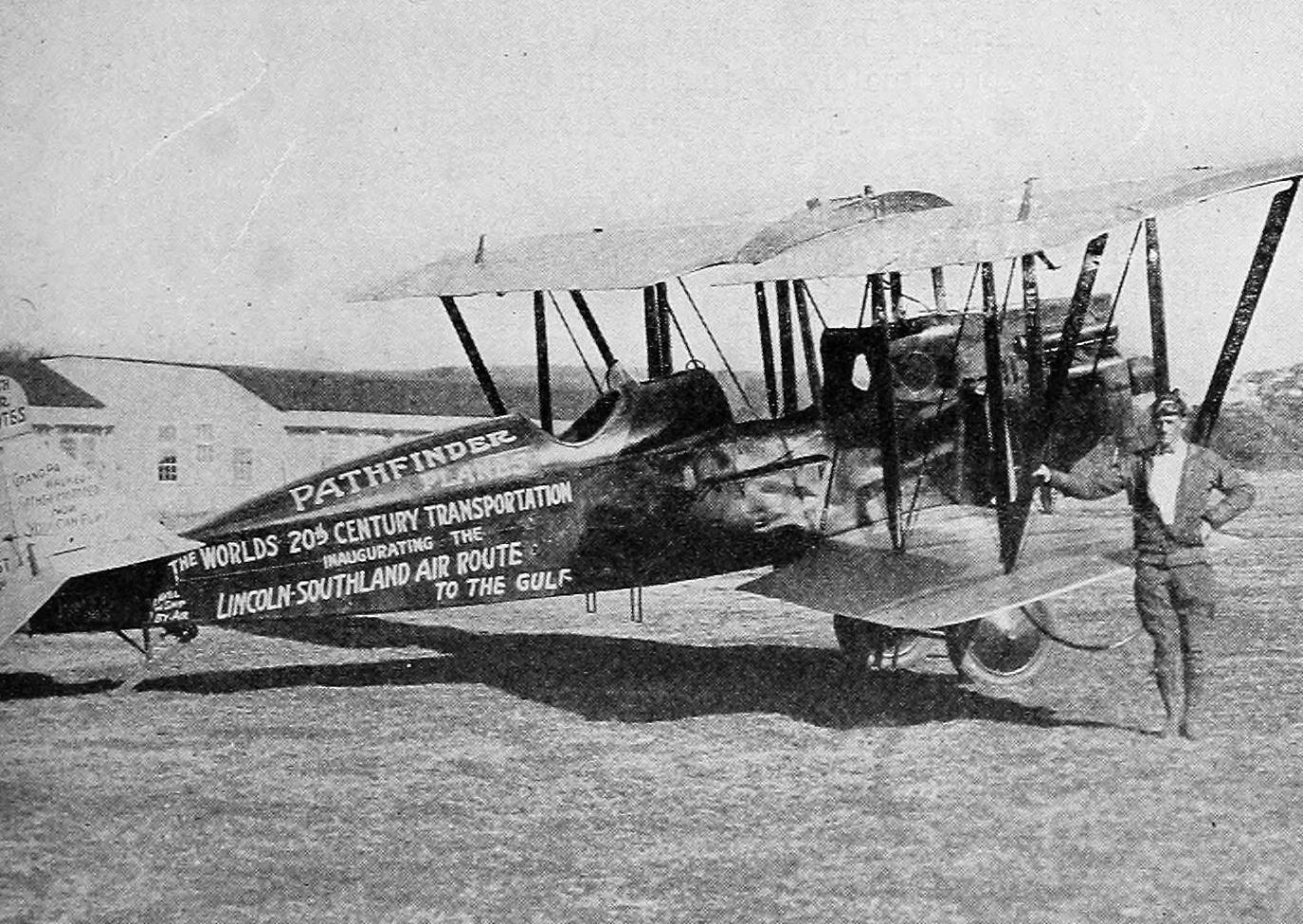

General information
- Type: Commercial Biplane
- National origin: United States
- Manufacturer: Lincoln-Page Aircraft Co.

History
- Introduction date: 1924
- Developed from: Standard J

The Lincoln Standard L.S.5 was a modification of the Standard J biplane to accommodate 5 passengers marketed by the Lincoln Aircraft Company (later the Lincoln-Page Aircraft Co.).

== Design and development ==
The L.S.5 was a modification to the Standard J biplane. The aircraft featured an engine upgrade to 150 hp (112 kW) from the original Curtiss OX-5 engine and a modification to the fuselage to seat four passengers in an unusually deep open cockpit layout with side-by-side configuration seating facing each other.

Mexican aviator Emilio Carranza purchased and flew a L.S.5, named "Excelsior", making flights that earned him the reputation of "The Lindbergh of Mexico" in 1927. It crashed on July 12, 1928, killing Carranza, on a return flight from New York.

== Specifications (L.S.5) ==
Data from Aerofiles La-Lin and SkyWays

General characteristics

- Crew: one
- Capacity: four passengers
- Upper wingspan: 44 ft 7 in (13.59 m)
- Lower wingspan: 32 ft (9.8 m)
- Airfoil: RAF 3
- Empty weight: 1,735 lb (787 kg)
- Gross weight: 2,922 lb (1,325 kg)
- Powerplant: 1 × Hispano-Suiza 8 V-8 water-cooled piston engine, 150 hp (110 kW)

Performance

- Maximum speed: 80.6 kn (92.8 mph, 149.3 km/h)
- Cruise speed: 75 kn (86 mph, 138 km/h)
- Stall speed: 30 kn (34 mph, 55 km/h)
- Range: 270 nmi (310 mi, 500 km)
- Service ceiling: 18,000 ft (5,500 m)
- Rate of climb: 520 ft/min (2.6 m/s)

== See also ==
Related development

- Standard J
