= Aerial Engineering Corporation Standard 6W-3 =

Standard 6W-3
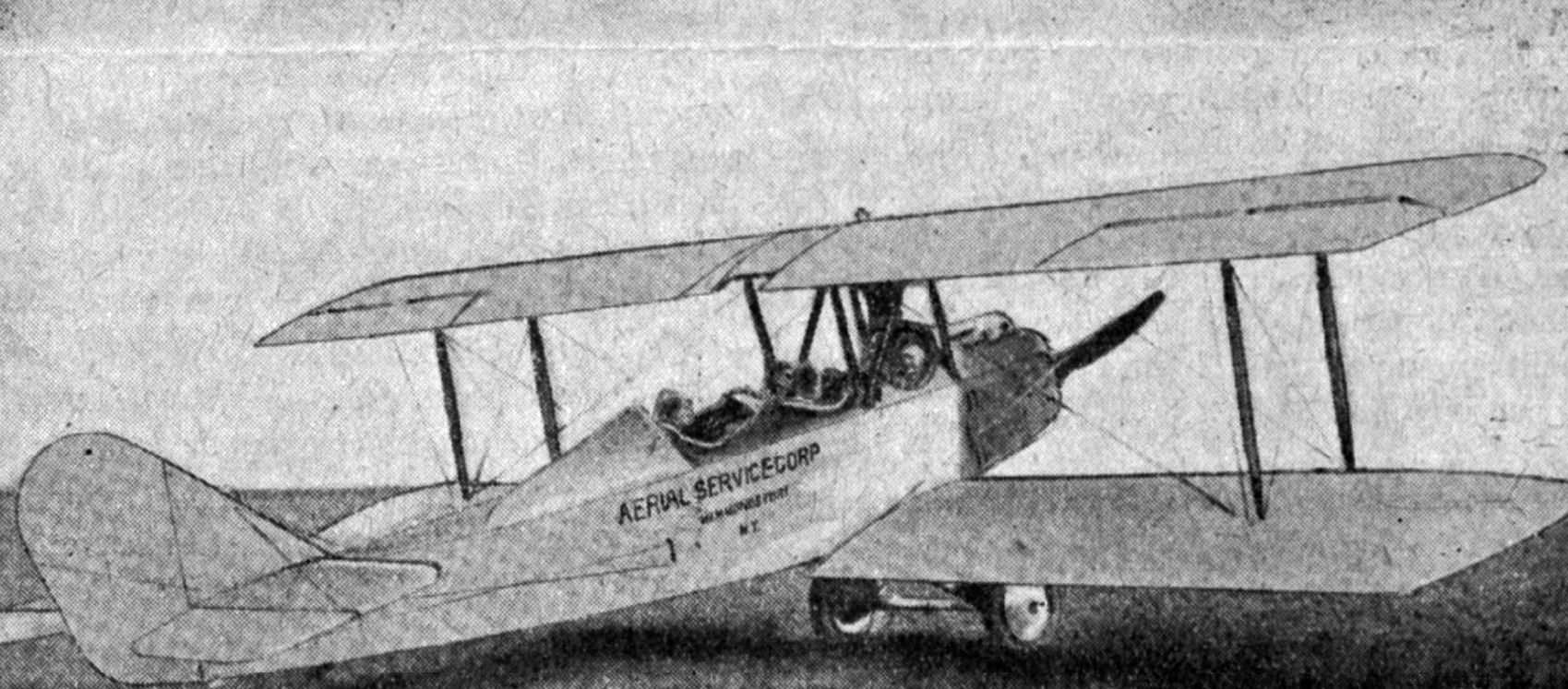

General information
- Type: Commercial transport aircraft
- National origin: United States
- Manufacturer: Aerial Engineering Corporation
- Designer: Harvey C. Mummert
- Number built: <10

History
- First flight: 1925

The Aerial Engineering Corporation Standard 6W-3 was a commercial transport modification of the US Standard J-1 biplane military trainer aircraft, with new wings, engine and accommodation for four passengers. First flown in 1925, it was built in small numbers.

== Design and development ==
The Standard J-1 military trainer had been built in large numbers at the end of World War I. With many surplus after the war, it was a natural choice for adaptation by several manufacturers. Ariel Service, with the experienced designer Harvey Mummert who was an early collaborator with Glenn Curtiss, produced the Mercury Standard 6W-3 by combining a completely new wing with a Standard J fuselage and empennage, modified to accommodate four passengers rather than a student and with a new and more powerful engine.

The Standard 6W-3 was a single bay biplane with constant chord, straight-edged wings swept at 5° and with a more modern, thicker airfoil than most of those used during WWI. Its upper wing was flat but the lower one had 1.5° of dihedral. There were balanced ailerons on the upper wing. Both wings were wooden structures based on twin spruce box spars with the lower wing attached to the lower fuselage longerons and the upper wing braced to it. without stagger, by a pair of vertical interplane struts on each side between the spars. The narrow centre section, where the chord was reduced to improve the pilot's upward field of view, was supported over the fuselage with pairs of N-form cabane struts.

Its modified Standard fuselage, with new longerons and covering, now housed a 120 kW (160 hp) six-cylinder, water-cooled inline Curtiss C-6 engine with a honeycomb radiator in front of it and a fuel tank in the upper wing. Immediately behind it a new, large, under-wing cockpit with seats for four passengers, two in aft-facing side-by-side seats and two more opposite them. The seats were easily replaceable, allowing the 6W-3 to act as a mailplane. The pilot was in a separate cockpit behind the passengers with a large fairing behind his head.

The empennage was conventional, with a low aspect ratio tailplane and generous elevators mounted on top of the fuselage. The fin was triangular, with a rounded rudder. The 6W-3 had conventional, fixed, tailskid landing gear with wheels on a single axle held by twin V-struts to the lower fuselage longerons. Rubber cord shock absorbers were fitted.

The first flight was in 1925. Fewer than ten were built.

== Specifications ==
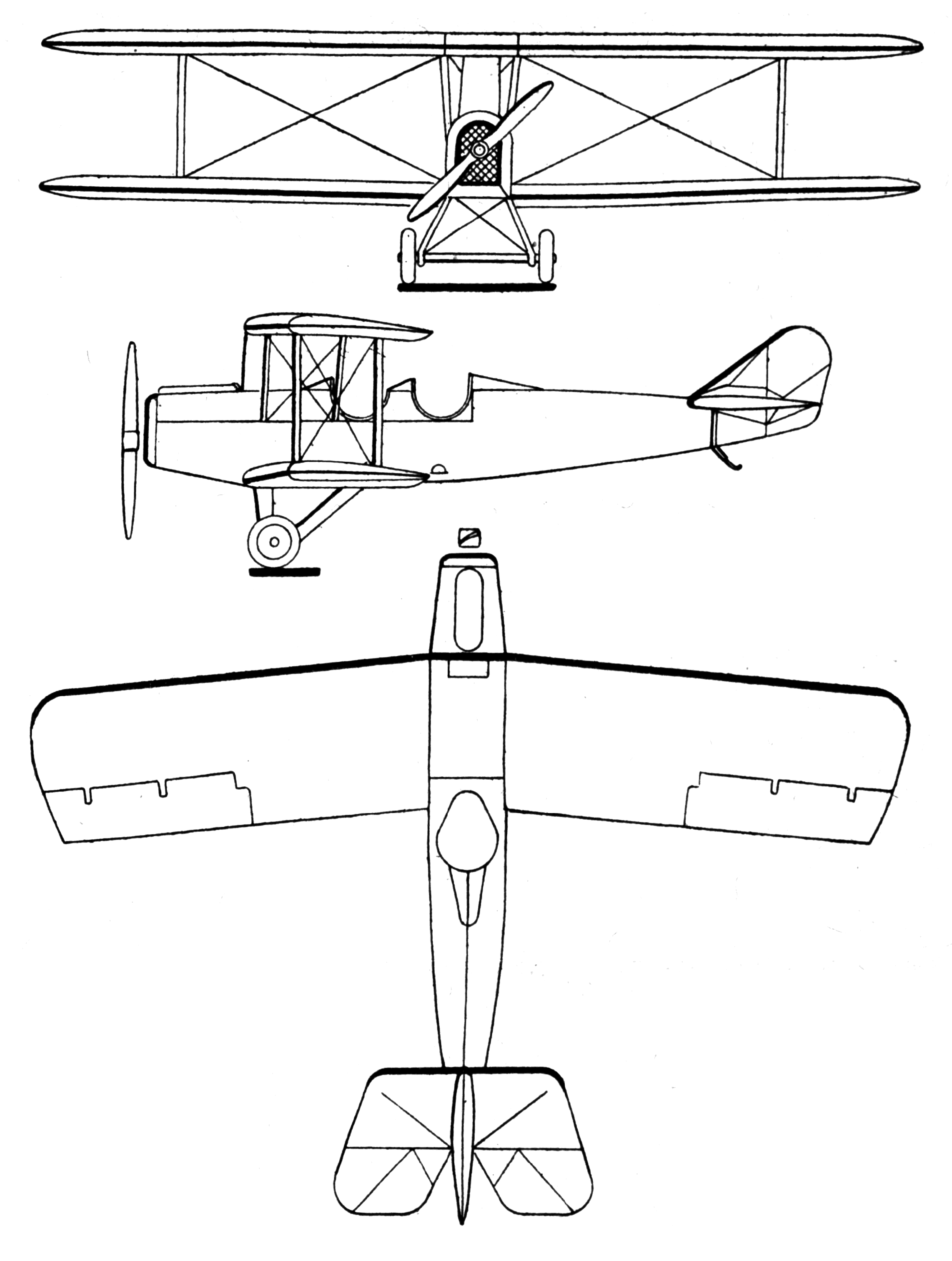
Mercury Standard 6W-3 3-view drawing from Les Ailes February 18,1926

Data from Les Ailes, February 1926

General characteristics

- Crew: One
- Capacity: four passengers
- Length: 8.20 m (26 ft 11 in)
- Wingspan: 10.57 m (34 ft 8 in)
- Height: 3.33 m (10 ft 11 in)
- Wing area: 33.85 m^{2} (364.4 sq ft)
- Airfoil: Clark Y
- Empty weight: 713 kg (1,572 lb)
- Gross weight: 1,198 kg (2,641 lb)
- Fuel capacity: 200 L (44 imp gal; 53 US gal)
- Powerplant: 1 × Curtiss C-6 water-cooled 6-cylinder inline, 120 kW (160 hp)
- Propellers: 2-bladed, 2.60 m (8 ft 6 in) diameter

Performance

- Maximum speed: 169 km/h (105 mph, 91 kn)
- Cruise speed: 145 km/h (90 mph, 78 kn)
- Stall speed: 73 km/h (45 mph, 39 kn) minimum speed
- Range: 580 km (360 mi, 310 nmi)
- Service ceiling: 4,575 m (15,010 ft)
