= Shannon Airport (Virginia) =

- IATA: EZF; ICAO: KEZF; FAA LID: EZF

Summary
- Airport type: Public
- Owner/Operator: Private
- Location: Fredericksburg, Virginia
- Elevation AMSL: 85 ft / 26 m
- Coordinates: 38°15′58″N 077°26′57″W
- Website: http://www.shannonezf.com/

Map
- Location of airport in Virginia / United States EZF (the United States)

Runways
Direction	Length		Surface
Direction	ft	m	Surface
06/24	2,999	914	Asphalt
15/33	1,300	396	Turf

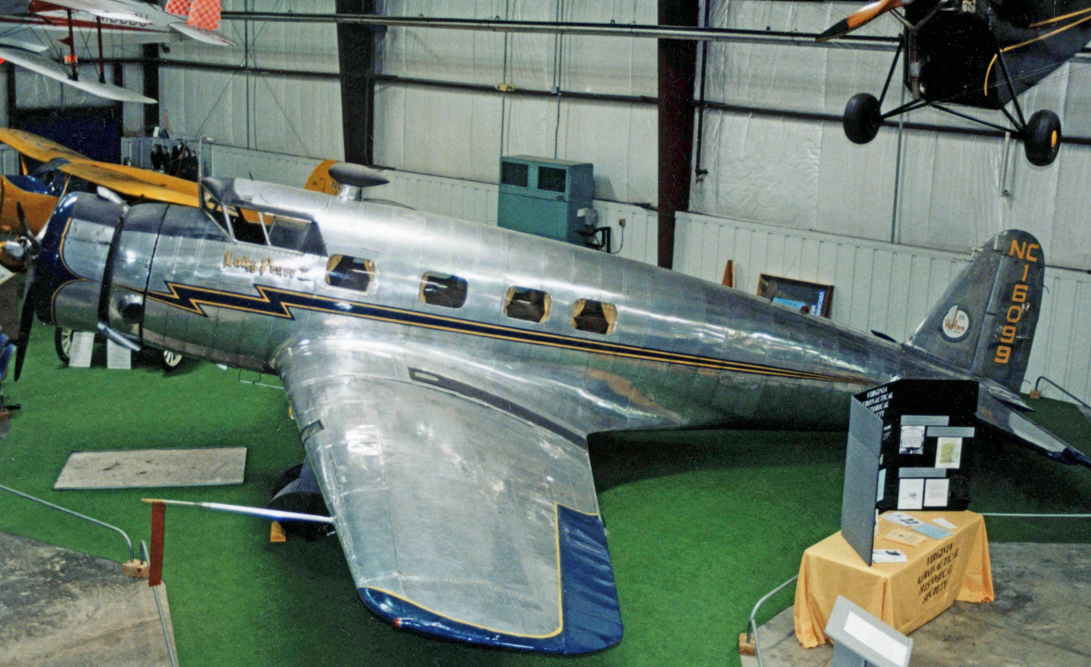
The Vultee V-1A at the Virginia Aviation Museum before its return to the Shannon Air Museum

Shannon Airport (ICAO: KEZF, FAA LID: EZF) is a public use airport located 2 mi (3.2 km) south of the City of Fredericksburg, Virginia, United States. It was opened in October 1950 by Sidney L. Shannon Jr in honor of his father, Sidney Shannon Sr, an early investor in Eastern Airlines.

== Facilities and aircraft ==
Shannon Airport covers 62 acres adjacent to the American Civil War battlefield at Slaughter Pen Farm. As of 2019, there are 85 single-engine General aviation aircraft, 5 multi-engine aircraft, 2 helicopters, 2 ultralights, and a single glider based on the field. The two runways, (grass, 15/33 and asphalt, 06/24), measure 1300' and 2999' respectively. The airport also has full fuel service as well as self serve (Jet A and 100LL), courtesy cars, a restaurant, gift shop, and a flight school.

== Civil War history ==
A major part of the Battle of Fredericksburg was fought where the airport now stands. A ditch at the end of what is now runway 24 became a key portion of the battle with hand-to-hand combat taking place before the Federal troops finally retreated. Artillery was situated where the terminal is, and artifacts such as buttons, musket balls and artillery shells were found when the taxiway was replaced. Many of these artifacts are currently on display at the Shannon Air Museum.

== Air Museum ==
Shannon Airport is home to the Shannon Air Museum, founded in 1976. The museum currently displays the last surviving Vultee V-1, along with other "Golden Age" aircraft such as the Pitcairn Mailwing, and Curtiss Robin.

The collection was relocated to Virginia Aviation Museum at Richmond International Airport upon Sid Shannon Jr.'s death in 1981. The Shannon Air Museum only reopened in June 2017 when volunteers were able to move the collection back, after the Virginia Aviation Museum (then a part of Science Museum of Virginia) had closed the previous year due to its building deteriorating.

Notable curators of the museum included Dick Merrill.

== Accidents and incidents ==
- 15 June 1980: During an airshow, Sgt. First Class Tom Johnson, a parachute jumper with the U.S. Army Golden Knights, fell over 10,000 feet to his death when both of his parachutes (main and reserve) failed to deploy.
- 29 September 2012: A Cessna 150M, registration number N66246, went into a 90-degree left bank immediately after takeoff and descended in a spiral, striking the ground and killing the pilot and the single passenger. The accident was attributed to "The pilot's failure to maintain airplane control during initial climb. Contributing to the accident was the pilot's impairment due to alcohol."
- 22 July 2013: A Cessna 172M, registration number N61954, pitched down into a near-vertical full-power descent from an altitude of approximately 3,000 feet (900 m) and struck the ground about 200 feet (60 m) northwest of the runway, killing the pilot and sole occupant. The pilot had recently been diagnosed with "severe recurrent major depression," and after a brief altercation with him before the flight, his fiancée had reported to local police that she believed he intended to kill himself. The accident was attributed to "The pilot's intentional descent into the ground to commit suicide."
- 12 August 2016: A Beechcraft T-42A, registration number N128VB, struck the ground during an attempted go-around after an unsuccessful landing attempt, substantially damaging the aircraft and killing all 6 occupants. Investigators found no significant anomalies in the aircraft and its engines. The accident was attributed to "The pilot(s) failure to maintain adequate airspeed during an attempted go-around, which resulted in an exceedance of the airplane's critical angle of attack and an aerodynamic stall."
