= Standard H-2 =

H-2
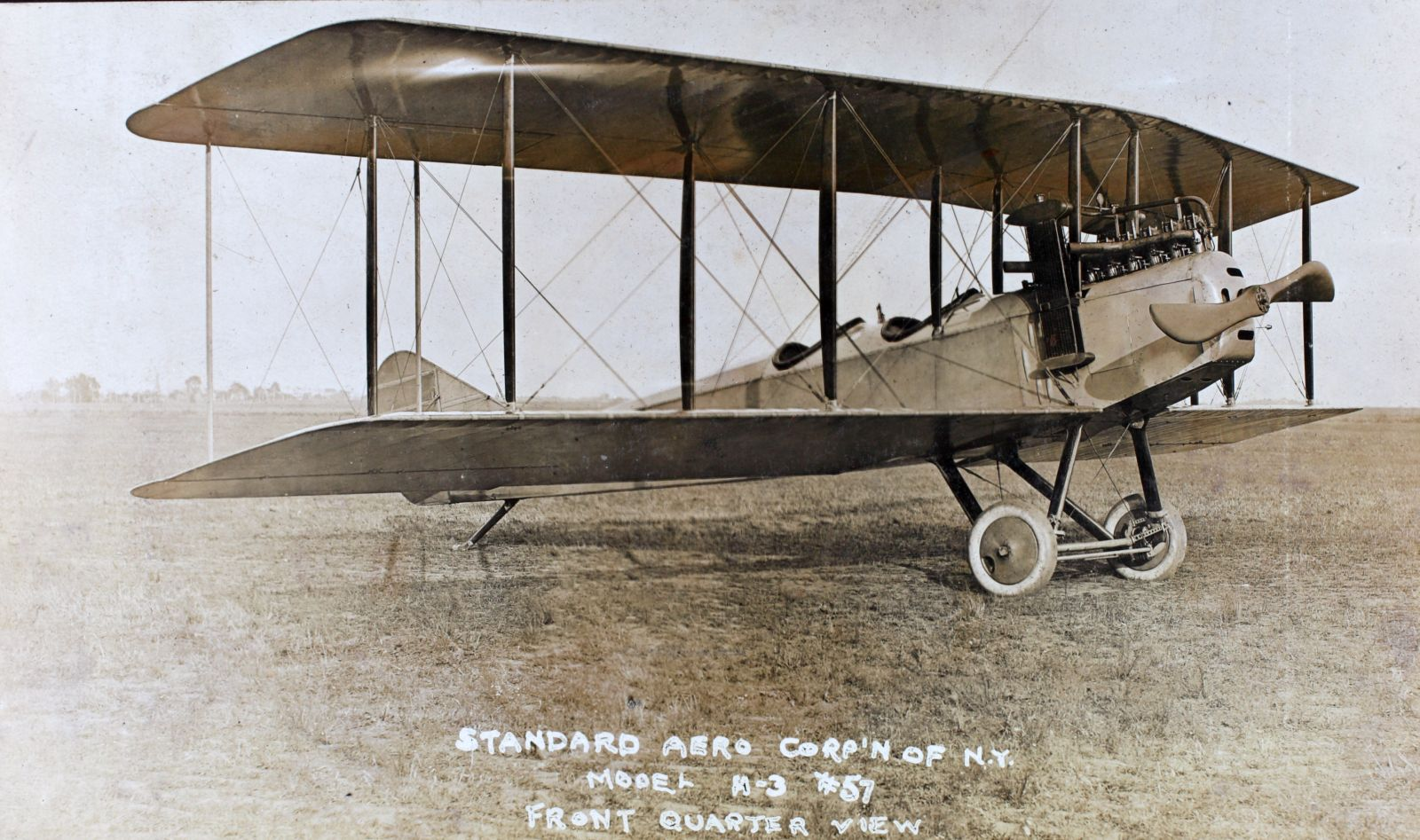
- Standard H-3

General information
- Type: Trainer
- National origin: United States
- Manufacturer: Standard Aircraft Corporation

The Standard H-2 was an early American Army reconnaissance aircraft, ordered in 1916. The H-2 was built by the Standard Aircraft Corporation, and previously known as the Sloane H-2. It was an open-cockpit three-place tractor biplane, powered by a 125 hp (90 kW) Hall-Scott A-5 engine. Only three were built.

An improved version, the H-3, with the same engine, earned an order for nine aircraft, while the Navy ordered three with floats as the H-4H.

Two Standard H-3s were sold by the US Army to Japan, where a further three were built by the Provisional Military Balloon Research Association (PMBRA) in 1917, powered by 150 hp (110 kW) Hall-Scott L-4 engines. They were used as trainers between May 1917 and March 1918, although they were considered dangerous.

== Operators ==
Japan

- Imperial Japanese Navy Air Service

United States

- United States Army
- United States Navy

== Specifications (H-3) ==
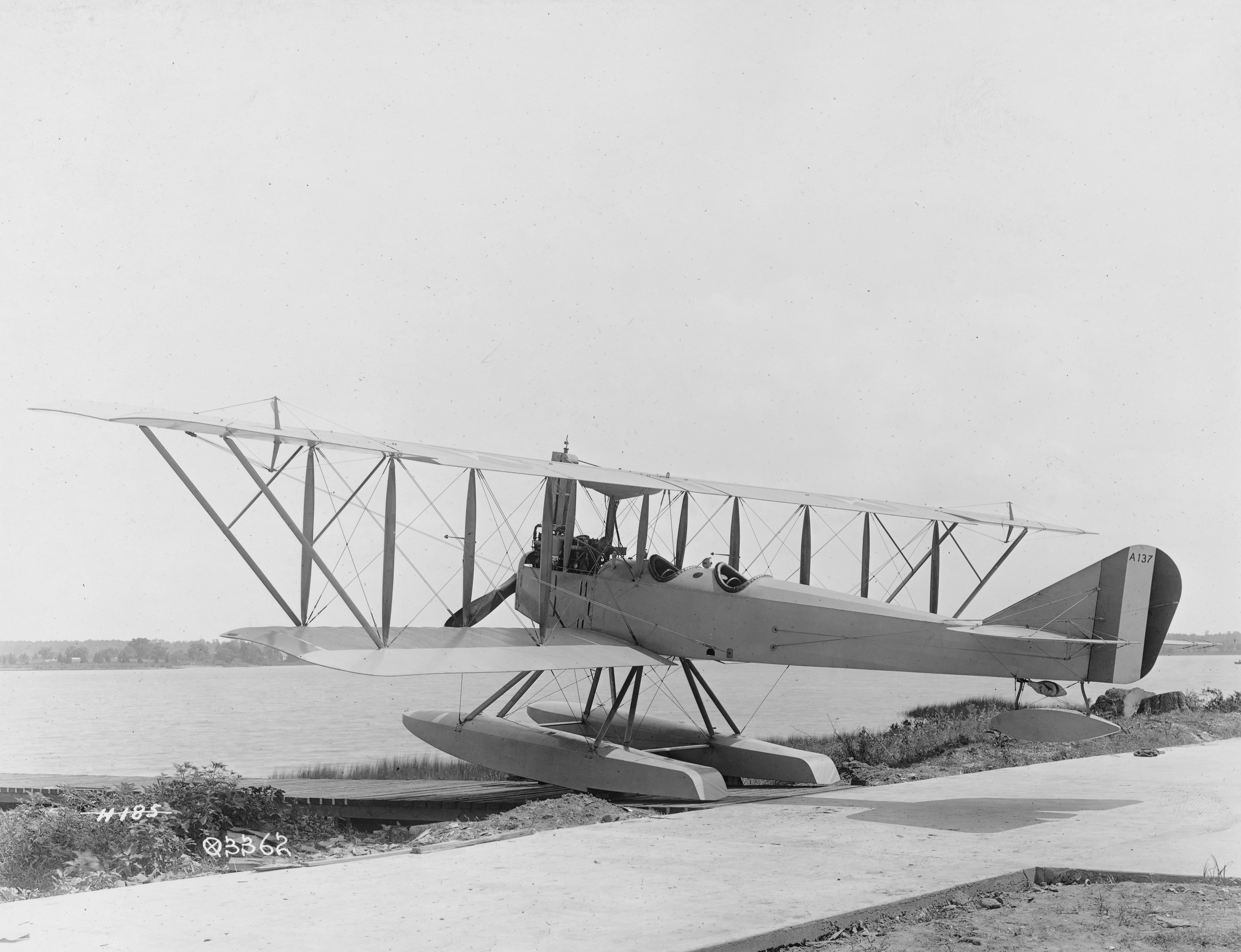
H-4H seaplane

Data from Course in Aerodynamics and Airplane Design: Part II–Section 1

General characteristics

- Crew: 2
- Length: 27 ft 0 in (8.23 m)
- Wingspan: 40 ft 1 in (12.22 m)
- Wing area: 532 sq ft (49.4 m^{2})
- Empty weight: 2,500 lb (1,134 kg)
- Gross weight: 3,300 lb (1,497 kg)
- Fuel capacity: 68 US gal (57 imp gal; 260 L)
- Powerplant: 1 × Hall-Scott A-5 straight-6, 135 hp (101 kW)

Performance

- Maximum speed: 84 mph (135 km/h, 73 kn)
- Stall speed: 46 mph (74 km/h, 40 kn)
- Endurance: 6 hr
- Time to altitude: 10 minutes to 3,400 ft (1,000 m)
