= Bevo Howard =

American aerobatic pilot (1914–1971)

- Born: 11 August 1914; Bath, South Carolina
- Died: July 17, 1971 (aged 56); Greenville, North Carolina
- Cause of death: Air crash
- Known for: Aerobatic flight

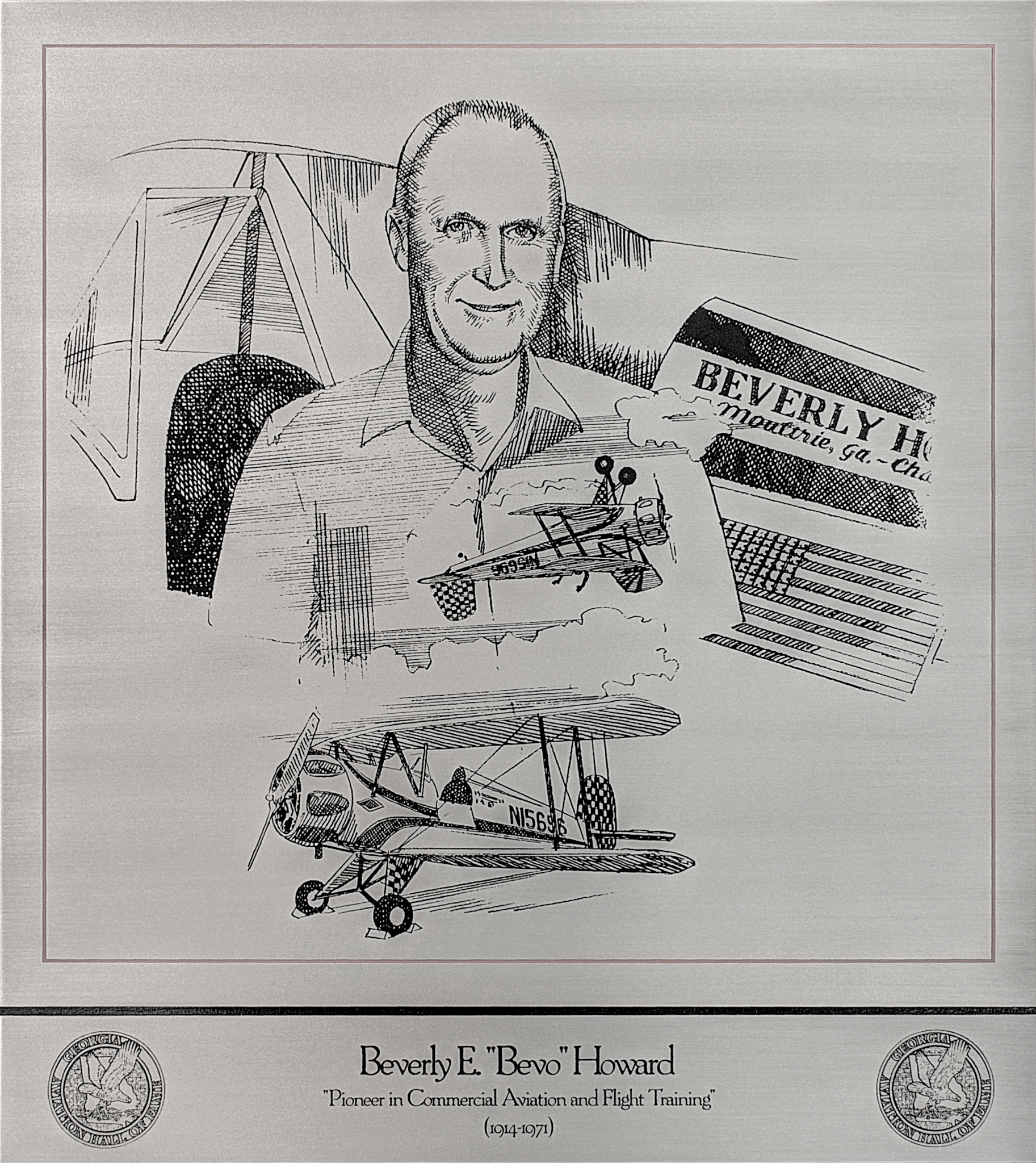
Plaque of Howard at the Georgia Aviation Hall of Fame

Beverly "Bevo" Howard (August 11, 1914, Bath, South Carolina – October 17, 1971, Greenville, North Carolina) was an American aerobatic pilot and aviation businessman.

== Life ==
Howard learned to fly in 1930 before the age of 16 by working as a lineboy for Hawthorne Flying Services in Augusta, Georgia. Shortly thereafter he purchased the struggling company and flew DC-2s for Delta Air Lines and Eastern Airlines in order to support Hawthorne. He became the youngest pilot to receive an Airline Transport Rating before the regulations increased the age limit to 21.

During the Second World War, he operated a primary flight training school for the United States Army Air Forces at Orangeburg, South Carolina. Over 6000 pilots, including 2000 French Air Force students, were trained at his school.

At Orangeburg, he presented and demonstrated to the Army Air Corps the concept of using Piper Cubs as forward artillery observer aircraft, which could be operated out of unimproved farm fields close to the front lines, which was adopted and used with large success throughout World War II.

After the war, Howard continued to train US Air Force and foreign pilots from Europe and the Middle East including training foreign pilots in P-51 Mustangs.

The civilian Aviation Services run by Hawthorne overexpanded across North and South Carolina and were eventually consolidated into a single location on the municipal airport at Charleston, South Carolina, which he ran until his death in 1971.

A school run by his Hawthorne Aviation at Moultrie, Georgia trained approximately 10,000 pilots from 32 countries in 10 years. In addition to the Spence Air Base school in Moultrie, Hawthorne operated a number of both Air Force and Army contract schools across the Southeastern United States, notably at Fort Rucker, Alabama and Fort Campbell, Kentucky.

Howard began air show flying in 1933. In 1938, he became the first pilot to fly an outside loop in a light plane, flying a 37½ horsepower Piper Cub. He went on to win the National Lightplane Aerobatic Championships in three consecutive years from 1939 to 1941, and eventually became one of the best known air show pilots in the country. Since his primary occupation was running the many aspects of his company (Hawthorne Aviation), flying airshows became an avocation and he flew many exhibitions for charity or cost such as the show where he was killed.

On October 17, 1971, while performing at an air show in Greenville, North Carolina, he struck a tree while flying his Bücker Bü 133 Jungmeister. One wing was knocked off the airplane, and Howard was killed instantly when it struck the ground.

His red and white checkered biplane, rebuilt after the crash to non-flying condition, is now in the National Air and Space Museum of the Smithsonian Institution. A Bücker Bü 133C Jungmeister, marked as his aircraft is also displayed at the Virginia Aviation Museum at Richmond International Airport, Virginia.
