= Virginia Aviation Museum =

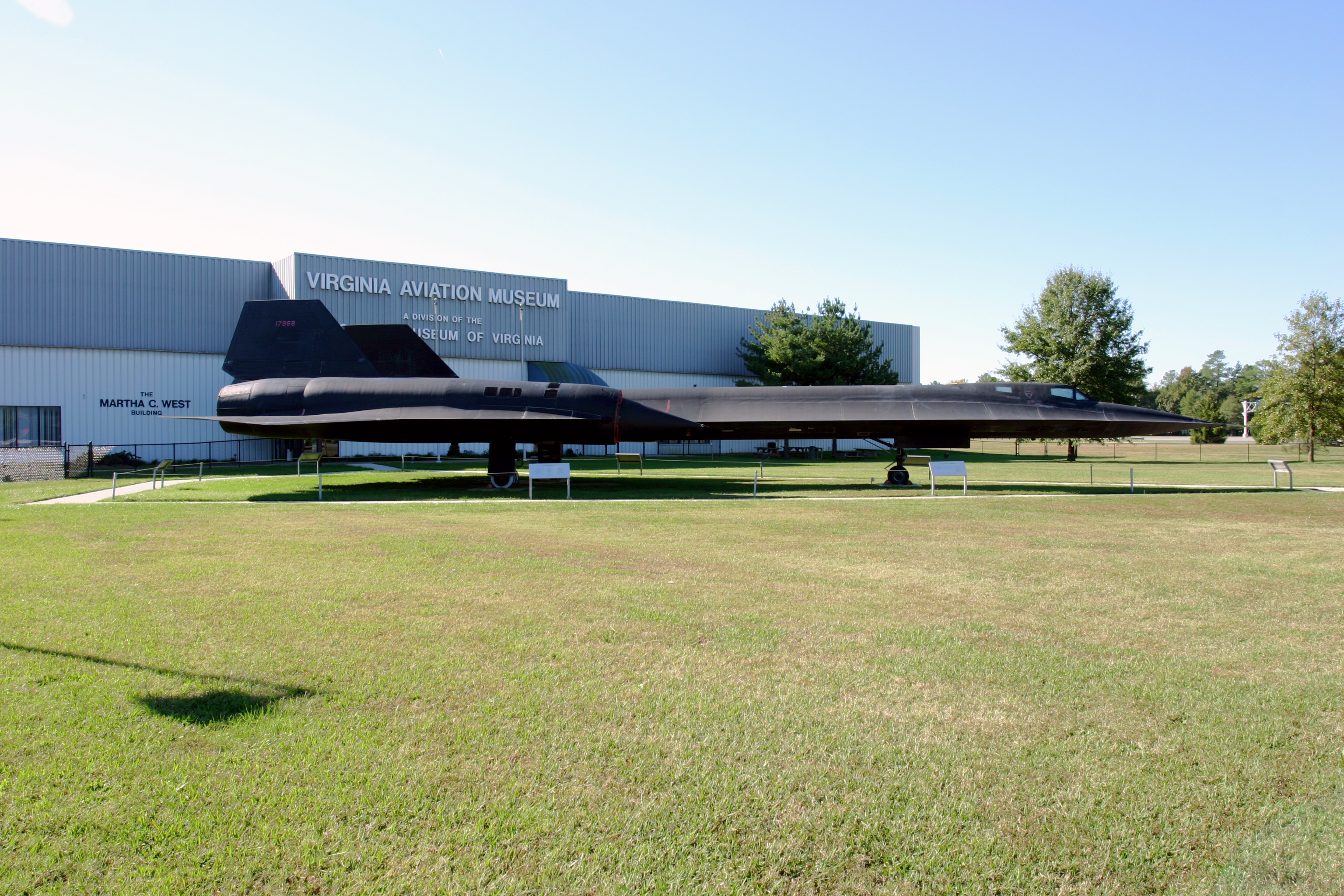
- The SR-71 Blackbird in front of the museum
- Established: 1986
- Dissolved: June 30, 2016
- Location: 5701 Huntsman Road, Sandston, Virginia
- Coordinates: 37°31′1″N 77°20′2.8″W
- Type: Aviation Museum
- Director: Edward Andrews
- Website: Virginia Aviation Museum

The Virginia Aviation Museum was an aviation museum in unincorporated Henrico County, Virginia, adjacent to Richmond International Airport (formerly "Richard Evelyn Byrd Flying Field"). Erected in 1986, the museum housed a collection of some thirty-four airframes, both owned and on-loan, ranging from reproductions of Wright Brothers kite gliders to the still state-of-the-art SR-71 Blackbird. It was a subsidiary of the Science Museum of Virginia.

The museum was housed in the Martha C. West Building, a hangar named after Martha C. West, a pioneering aviator and the first president of the Richmond Women’s Flying Club. This building was originally planned to be a temporary storage facility until the actual museum building finished construction. That never happened and the museum closed June 30, 2016 after issues with the roof and climate control became insurmountable, issuing a terse statement stating "[the building had] reached the end of its useful life."

The SR-71 was moved to the Science Museum of Virginia where it is on display. The Shannon collection (acquired in 1981 when Sidney Shannon Jr died) was returned to Shannon Air Museum the year after closure. This collection includes the Pitcairn Mailwing and the Vultee V-1, among others.

== Exhibits and artifacts ==
=== WWI and Golden Age of Aviation ===
- SPAD S.VII, B9913, built 1917 by Mann Egerton from United Kingdom - one of 19 that went to Rockwell Field Pursuit Gunnery School, San Diego, California in 1918 (later NAS North Island).
- Standard E-1, no registration or serial, built 1918, rescued from barn near Dayton, Ohio in 1950s and restored.
- Curtiss JN-4D, Signal Corps 2975, c/n 450, built 1918, on loan from Ken Hyde from Warrenton, Virginia.
- Pitcairn PA-5 Mailwing, NC3835, c/n 9, built 1927 - in Eastern Air Transport markings, on loan from the Science Museum of Virginia.
- Bellanca CH-400 Skyrocket, NX237, c/n 187, built 1928 as a CH-300 Pacemaker, salvaged from a glacier in 1976 and converted to CH-400 and marked as "Columbia", the original of which was destroyed in a hangar fire.
- Travel Air 2000, NC6282, c/n 721, built 1927.
- Fairchild FC-2W2, NX8006, c/n 140, built 1928, "Stars And Stripes" - Richard Evelyn Byrd's Arctic exploration aircraft, on loan from the National Air and Space Museum.
- Heath Super Parasol, N1926, c/n 31919, built 1928, donated by Dr. E. C. Garber, Fayetteville, North Carolina.
- Pietenpol Air Camper and Sky Scout, N9040N, c/n 410, Ford-powered homebuilt, 1928, built and donated by Charles F. Duff.
- Brunner-Winkle Bird BK, c/n 2025, built 1929, on loan from Dolph Overton.
- Curtiss-Robertson J-1D Robin, NC532N, c/n 733, built 1929, restored by Francis Clore.
- Fleet Model 1, NC766V, c/n 347, built August 1930 - marked as USAAC YPT-6.
- Aeronca C-2N Razor Back, N11417, c/n 151, originally built 1932 as C-1 Clipped Wing Cadet, converted 1932 to C-2N; rebuilt 1962.
- Taylor E-2 Cub, NC12628, c/n 33, built 1932.
- Aeronca C-3 NC14640, c/n 426, built 1935, donated by Kenneth Brugh from Greensboro, North Carolina.
- Waco YOC, NC17740, c/n 4279, built 1935, on loan from the Virginia Aeronautical Historical Society - once owned by Hollywood artist Walter Matthew Jeffries who designed the Starship Enterprise.
- Curtiss-Wright A-14D Speedwing, NC12329, built 1936, on loan from Allen H. Watkins.

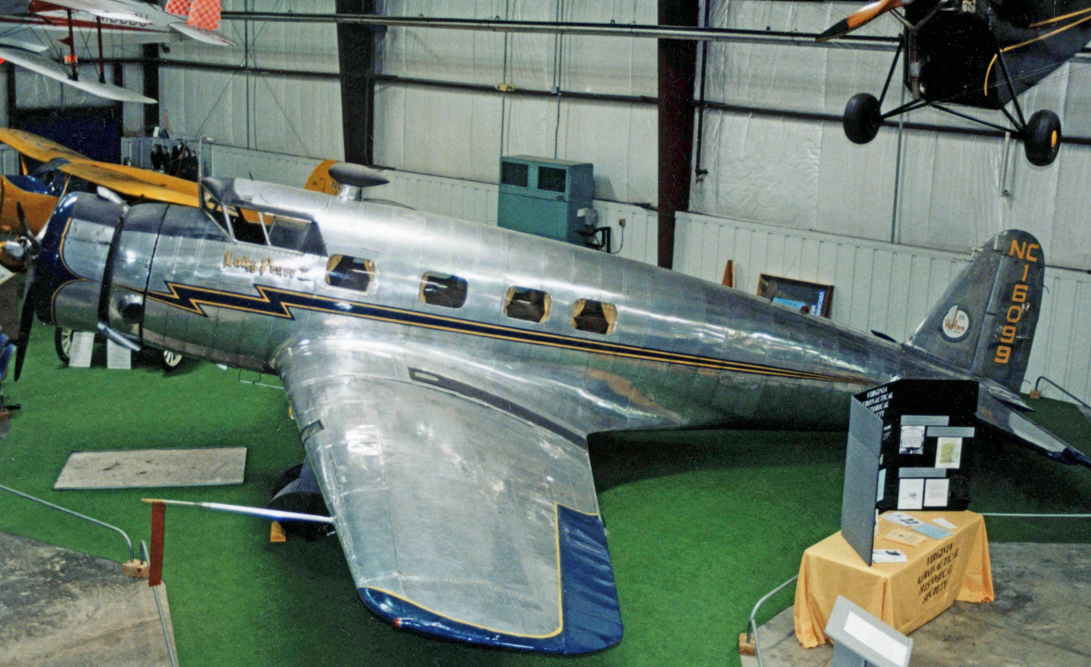
The Vultee V-1A Special at the museum. It has since been returned to Shannon Air Museum.

- Vultee V-1AD Special, NC16099, c/n 25, built 1936, "Lady Peace II" - once owned by publisher William Randolph Hearst, only one known in existence.
- Fairchild 24-G, N19123, c/n 2983, built August 1937.
- Stinson SR-10G Reliant, NC21135, c/n 5903, built 1937 for American Airlines - on loan from the Science Museum of Virginia.
- Waco EGC-8, c/n 5062, built for by R. G. LeTourneau, 1938, one of seven total sold - now owned by David Tyndall from Mechanicsville, Virginia - undergoing restoration in the museum shop.
- Bücker Bü 133C Jungmeister, N133BU, c/n 251, built 1941 - marked as aircraft of Beverly "Bevo" Howard.
- Piper J-3 Cub, N42535, c/n 14812, built 1943.

=== Modern ===
- Grumman F-14 Tomcat
- Douglas A-4 Skyhawk
- Lockheed SR-71 Blackbird
- LTV A-7D Corsair II

== See also ==
- List of aerospace museums
- Virginia Air and Space Center
