= Colorado Authors Hall of Fame =

Coordinates: 38.9972°N 105.5478°W

- Location: Denver, Colorado
- Country: United States
- First award: 2019
- Website: Colorado Authors Hall of Fame

The Colorado Authors Hall of Fame is an award for authors from Colorado who are connected to Colorado or use Colorado in their written works. It "celebrates the accomplishments of living and past authors connected to Colorado." It is a volunteer-run 501(c)(3) nonprofit organization.

Their mission is to "honor and promote the works of outstanding published authors from all genres and generations to ensure their legacies will not be lost."

M. L. Hanson and Judith Briles created the Colorado Authors Hall of Fame in 2014; the first inductees were honored in 2019. They present awards every other year, in 2019, 2021 and 2023. There are three sections for the awards: for living authors, deceased authors, and support awards.

The organization also provides Aspiring Authors Scholarships, awarded in even-numbered years.

== Inductees ==
Colorado Authors Hall of Fame
Name	Image	Birth–Death	Year
Marilyn Van Derbur Atler		(born 1937)	2019
Rex Burns		(born 1935)	2019
Margaret Coel		(born 1937)	2019
John Dunning		(1942–2023)	2019
John Fielder		(1950–2023)	2019
W. C. Jameson		(born 1942)	2019
Jerry Jenkins		(born 1949)	2019
Stephen King		(born 1947)	2019
Ann Parker			2019
Dom Testa			2019
Helen Thorpe		(born 1963)	2019
Jill Tietjen		(born 1954)	2019
Kris Tualla			2019
Connie Willis		(born 1945)	2019
Mary Taylor Young			2019
Madeleine Albright		(1937–2022)	2019
Clive Cussler		(1931–2020)	2019
Sybil Downing		(1930–2011)	2019
George Cory Franklin		(1872–1962)	2019
Louis L'Amour		(1908–1988)	2019
Minnie Reynolds		(1865–1936)	2019
Ann Haymond Zwinger		(1925–2014)	2019
Joyce Meskis		(1942–2022)	2019
Kevin J. Anderson		(born 1962)	2021
Penny Rafferty Hamilton		(born 1948)	2021dalla
Justin Matott			2021
Sandra Dallas		(born 1939)	2021
Carol Fenster		(born 1935)	2021
W. Michael Gear		(born 1955)	2021
Charlotte Hinger			2021
Manuel Ramos			2021
Patricia Raybon			2021
Richard Weissman			2021
Flint Whitlock			2021
"Avi" Edward Wortis		(born 1937)	2021
Robert Heinlein		(1907–1988)	2021
James Michener		(1907–1997)	2021
John Edward Williams		(1922–1994)	2021
Hannah Marie Wormington		(1914–1994)	2021
Sue Lubeck		(1933–2021)	2021
Jeanne Abrams		(born 1951)	2023
Kathleen O'Neal Gear		(born 1954)	2023
Temple Grandin		(born 1947)	2023
Bill Hamilton			2023
Peter Heller		(born 1959)	2023
Mary Kelly			2023
Patricia Nelson Limerick		(born 1951)	2023
Thomas Jacob Noel		(born 1945)	2023
Linda Wommack			2023
Philip Yancey		(born 1949)	2023
Abelardo "Lalo" Delgado		(1931–2004)	2023
John Denver		(1943–1997)	2023

== See also ==
- List of Colorado-related lists
