= Bertling =

Bertling is a surname. Notable people with the surname include:

- Anthonij Ewoud Jan Bertling (1860–1945), Dutch politician
- Berit Bertling (born 1966), Norwegian novelist
- Karin Bertling (born 1937), Swedish actress
- Lina Bertling Tjernberg (née Bertling, born 1973), Swedish electrical engineer
