= Raybon =

Raybon is both a given name and a surname. Notable people with the name include:

- Israel Raybon (born 1973), American football player
- Marty Raybon (born 1959), American musician
- Patricia Raybon, American journalist
- Raybon Kan (born 1966), New Zealand comedian and newspaper columnist
