= William Alexander Hamilton, III =

American aviator

William A. "Bill" Hamilton
- Born: March 22, 1935; Pauls Valley, Oklahoma, U.S.
- Education: University of Oklahoma (BS); US Naval War College; George Washington University (MA); University of Nebraska–Lincoln (PhD)
- Spouse: Penny Rafferty Hamilton
- Awards: Colorado Aviation Hall of Fame; Colorado Authors Hall of Fame; Oklahoma University Army ROTC Hall of Fame; Oklahoma Military Hall of Fame; Nebraska Aviation Hall of Fame; Oklahoma Journalism Hall of Fame
- Military Service
- Branch: U.S. Army
- Commands: D Co. 2nd/5th Cavalry, 1st Air Cavalry Division
- Awards: Purple Heart; Bronze Star; Silver Star Medal

William A. "Bill" Hamilton is an American journalist, novelist, former newspaper editor, military historian, linguist, retired military officer, aviator, and co-holder of a world aviation speed record. After a highly decorated military career, he became an aviator, businessman and journalist – serving for 19 years as a featured commentator for USA Today. He has been inducted into the Oklahoma University Army ROTC Hall of Fame, Oklahoma Military Hall of Fame, Colorado Aviation Hall of Fame, Nebraska Aviation Hall of Fame, Oklahoma Journalism Hall of Fame, and the Colorado Authors Hall of Fame.

== Early life and education ==
Bill Hamilton was born on March 22, 1935, in Pauls Valley, Oklahoma. He had one brother. As a teenager, he was a paperboy for The Anadarko Daily News. During high school, he served as a page in the Oklahoma House of Representatives and was elected chief page in the Oklahoma Senate. He was elected Governor of Oklahoma's Boys’ State. Hamilton graduated from Anadarko High School and matriculated at the University of Oklahoma where he signed up for four years of Army Reserve Officers’ Training Corps. Bill graduated in 1957 with a degree in Government and was commissioned in the United States Army.

== Military career ==
Hamilton served in Vietnam and Cambodia and was awarded a Bronze Star Medal with "V" Device for his heroism in Vietnam and a Silver Star Medal for his gallantry in Cambodia. In Vietnam, he commanded Delta Company, 2d Battalion, 5th Cavalry. In Cambodia, he was operations officer for the 2nd Battalion of the 5th Cavalry. Between tours of duty in Vietnam, he was attached to the 19th U.S. Air Force and Chuck Yeager’s 4th Tactical Fighter Wing. He flew as the "guy-in-the-back" in the F-4 Phantom fighter.

He then attended the Naval War College where he was a Distinguished Graduate. He also earned his master's degree in international affairs from George Washington University during this time.

While serving in Europe, he commanded an airborne infantry battalion and an armored cavalry squadron. Upon his retirement from the military after 21 years, he began his civilian career.

== Military Awards and Medals ==
- Bronze Star Medal with "V" Device
- Silver Star Medal
- Legion of Merit
- Bronze Star (4)
- Purple Heart
- Air Medals (20)
- Distinguished Flying Cross
- Army Commendation Medal with "V" Device
- Air Force Commendation Medal
- Combat Infantry Badge
- Vietnamese Cross of Gallantry
- Vietnamese Medal of Honor

== Life after Military Service ==
After Hamilton's military service, the governor of Nebraska hired him as his aide and interpreter during a trade mission to Germany. After leaving state government, he taught history at Nebraska Wesleyan University. During that time, he was hired to write a weekly column on national and international affairs for SUN Newspapers. He also earned his PhD from the University of Nebraska–Lincoln in 1978. Subsequently, he and his wife bought The Capital Times of Lincoln, Nebraska where they served as co-editors. Later, he spent 19 years writing editorials for USA Today. They sold their interest in the Capital Times and moved to Grand County, Colorado in 1992.

In 1987, the Aircraft Owners and Pilots Association (AOPA) hired Hamilton as the regional representative to serve members in North Dakota, South Dakota, Nebraska and Kansas. Later, Colorado and Wyoming were added to his portfolio. He worked for AOPA for 24 years. Hamilton and his wife Penny Rafferty Hamilton co-hold a World Aviation Speed Record from Lincoln to New Orleans set in 1991.

In 1989, Hamilton was appointed to the Nebraska Aeronautics Commission. He was instrumental in the establishment of the Nebraska Aviation Council and the annual Nebraska Aviation Symposium. Dedicated to safe flying, he was also instrumental in the installation of weather-information kiosks at public airports across Nebraska.

In Colorado, Hamilton worked with former governor Bill Owens to establish 12 automated weather observation stations and rescued the Granby and Kremmling airports from closure. Later, he co-led the effort to name the Granby air field for Emily Howell Warner. He worked to establish the Colorado Division of Aeronautics, the Colorado Aeronautical Board, and the Colorado Aviation Trust Fund.

== Civilian Honors and Awards ==
His awards include:

- Oklahoma University Army ROTC Hall of Fame, 2008
- Oklahoma Military Hall of Fame, 2018
- Colorado Aviation Hall of Fame, 2008
- Nebraska Aviation Hall of Fame, 2017
- Oklahoma Journalism Hall of Fame, 2014
- Colorado Authors Hall of Fame, 2023
- Delta Upsilon Social Fraternity, Distinguished Alumnus Award, 2002
- Valley Forge Freedoms Foundation Award
- North Dakota, Outstanding Service to Aviation Award
- University of Nebraska–Lincoln, Alumni Achievement Award, 2015

== Personal life ==
Hamilton married Penny Rafferty Hamilton in 1971. He was three children from a previous marriage.

== Bibliography ==
- Formula for Failure in Vietnam: The Folly of Limited Warfare. McFarland Books. 2019. ISBN 9781476679945.
- The Wit and Wisdom of William Hamilton: The Sage of Sheepdog Hill. Pegasus Imprimis Press. 2017. ISBN 9780692949276.
- War During Peace: A Strategy for Defeat. Pegasus Imprimis Press. 2021. ISBN 9781476679945.
