= Jill Tietjen =

American electrical engineer

Jill S. Tietjen P.E.
- Born: Karen Jill Stein; 1954 (age 71–72); Newport News, Virginia, U.S.
- Education: University of Virginia (BS); University of North Carolina at Charlotte (MBA)
- Engineering career
- Discipline: Electrical engineering
- Awards: Colorado Women's Hall of Fame, 2010; Colorado Authors Hall of Fame, 2019; National Academy of Construction, 2022

Jill S. Tietjen (born 1954) is an American electrical engineer, consultant, women's advocate, author, and speaker. She is the president and CEO of Technically Speaking, Inc., an electric utilities consulting firm which she founded in Greenwood Village, Colorado, in 2000. She has written or co-authored fourteen books and more than 100 technical papers. A strong advocate for the participation of women and girls in the STEM fields, she establishes scholarships for women in engineering and technology, and nominates women for awards and halls of fame. She was inducted into the Colorado Women's Hall of Fame in 2010 and the Colorado Authors Hall of Fame in 2019, and elected to the National Academy of Construction in 2022.

== Early life and education ==
She was born Karen Jill Stein in Newport News, Virginia, in 1954. She is the oldest of four children. Her father, a PhD in engineering, worked at NASA.

She graduated from Hampton High School and entered the third class opened to women at the University of Virginia, in 1972. She graduated in 1976 with a major in applied mathematics and minor in electrical engineering. She was one of the first 10 women to graduate in engineering from that university. She began working at Duke Power Company in Charlotte, North Carolina, and went on to earn her MBA at the University of North Carolina at Charlotte in 1979.

== Career ==
After five years as a planning engineer with Duke Power, she moved to Denver, Colorado, in 1981 to become a planning analyst for Mobil Oil Corporation in the company's mining and coal division. As the energy business took a downturn in 1983, the following year she entered consulting work for electric utilities as assistant vice president of Stone & Webster Management Consultants in Greenwood Village, a position she held from 1984 to 1992. From 1992 to 1995 she was a principal with RCG/Hagler Bailly in Boulder, managing utility planning. She returned to Stone & Webster to run their Denver office from 1995 to 1997. During the latter period, she served as an expert witness for electric utilities before Federal and state regulatory commissions.

From 1997 to 2000, Tietjen turned to women's education as director of the Women in Engineering Program at the University of Colorado Boulder. Between 1997 and 2008 she was an accreditor for engineering programs nationwide, including those on behalf of the Institute of Electrical and Electronics Engineers (IEEE).

In 2000 she formed her own company, Technically Speaking, Inc., to provide consulting services to electric utilities. From 2001 to 2008 she worked as a senior engineer at McNeil Technologies, and from 2003 to 2005 as a senior management consultant at R. W. Beck.

== Women's advocate ==
Tietjen is a strong advocate for the participation of women and girls in the STEM fields. She mentors women and girls considering careers in engineering and technology, and has endowed scholarships for women in technology fields at the University of Virginia, the University of North Carolina at Charlotte, and the University of Colorado Boulder, as well as through the Society of Women Engineers. With an eye to supplying more role models for women, she regularly nominates candidates for awards and halls of fame in the engineering and technology fields. Her first nomination was for computer scientist Grace Hopper, who invented one of the first compiler related tools in 1952. In 1991 Hopper received the National Medal of Technology. Tietjen accepted the award on Hopper's behalf from President George H. W. Bush at a ceremony in the White House Rose Garden. Tietjen has nominated more than 30 inductees to the National Women's Hall of Fame across all fields of endeavor.

== Writing and speaking ==
Tietjen is an editor for the Springer Women in Engineering and Science series, and authored the series' introductory volume. She was a blogger for The Huffington Post from 2014 to 2018, writing about women's historical achievements.

Tietjen received training in public speaking in her first job at the Duke Power Company. She gave presentations on nuclear power for that company, and later used her speaking skills to deliver expert testimony for electric utilities before Federal and state regulatory commissions. She is also a motivational speaker on the topics of "women in engineering, historical women in engineering and science, and leadership".

== Memberships and affiliations ==
Tietjen was elected to the national board of the Society of Women Engineers in 1988 and served as its national president from 1991 to 1992. She was the first woman on the board of directors of the Rocky Mountain Electrical League, as well as that group's first woman president.

She was board chair of the Girl Scouts – Mile Hi Council from 1999 to 2007, and joined the board of the National Women's Hall of Fame from 2009 to 2014; in 2015 she was appointed CEO.

Tietjen is an Outside Director of the Georgia Transmission Corporation. She served as an Outside Director of Merrick & Company from 2010 to 2021. Since 2008, she is a trustee of the University of Virginia School of Engineering and Applied Science.

== Awards and honors ==
Tietjen has been listed in Who's Who in Engineering, Who's Who in Science and Engineering, and Who's Who in Technology. She was inducted into the Colorado Women's Hall of Fame in 2010 and the Colorado Authors' Hall of Fame in 2019. She was elected to the National Academy of Construction in 2022.

== Personal life ==
In 1976 she married her first husband, a fellow engineering student whom she met at the University of Virginia, becoming known as Jill S. Baylor. They divorced in 1994. She was married to David Tietjen from 1996 to 2024. She resides in Centennial, Colorado.

== Bibliography ==
- Women in the National Inventors Hall of Fame: The First 50 Years. Springer Nature. 2024. ISBN 9783031755255. (with Lauren Busch and Ilene Busch-Vishniac)
- Duty Calls: Lessons Learned from an Unexpected Life of Service. Fulcrum Publishing. 2024. ISBN 9781682754474. (with Antonia C. Novello)
- Women in Power: Research and Development Advances in Electric Power Systems. Springer Nature. 2023. ISBN 9783031297236. (with Marija D. Ilic, Lina Bertling Tjernberg, and Noel N. Schulz)
- Women in Renewable Energy. Springer Nature. 2023. ISBN 9783031285431. (with Katherine T. Wang)
- Over, Under, Around, And Through: How Hall of Famers Surmount Obstacles. Fulcrum Publishing. 2022. ISBN 978-1682753354. (with Elinor Miller Greenberg)
- Women in Infrastructure. Springer Nature. 2022. ISBN 978-3030928209. (with Peggy Layne)
- Scientific Women: Re-visioning Women's Scientific Achievements and Impacts. Springer Nature. 2020. ISBN 978-3030514457.
- Hollywood: Her Story, An Illustrated History of Women and the Movies. Rowman & Littlefield. 2019. ISBN 9781493037063. (with Barbara Bridges)
- Engineering Women: Re-visioning Women's Scientific Achievements and Impacts. Springer. 2016. ISBN 978-3319408002.
- Women in Engineering Book 9: Recognizing and Taking Advantage of Opportunities. IEEE USA. 2016.
- Inspiring Women of the National Women's Hall of Fame. National Women's Hall of Fame. 2015. ISBN 978-0986179105. (with Jillaine Newman and Merrill Amos)
- Her Story: A Timeline of the Women Who Changed America. Harper Collins. 2013. ISBN 978-0062041463. (with Charlotte. S. Waisman)
- Setting the Record Straight: The History and Evolution of Women's Professional Achievement in Accounting. White Apple Press. 2005. (with Betty Reynolds)
- Keys to Engineering Success. Prentice Hall. 2001. (with Kristy Schloss)
- Setting the Record Straight: An Introduction to the History and Evolution of Women's Professional Achievement. White Apple Press. 2001. ISBN 0964484951. (with Betty Reynolds)
- Setting the Record Straight: The History and Evolution of Women's Professional Achievement in Engineering. White Apple Press. 2001. (with Betty Reynolds)
- Women Engineering Legends 1952-1976: Society of Women Engineers Achievement Award Recipients. Springer Cham. 2025. ISBN 978-3-032-00223-5 (with Cecilia Craig, Holly Teig, Debra Kimberling, Janet Williams, Vicki Johnson)
