= William Hamilton =

William Hamilton may refer to:

== Academics ==
- Robert William Hamilton Jr. (1930–2011), known as Bill, American hyperbaric physiologist
- William Hamilton (university principal) (1669–1732), principal of the University of Edinburgh
- William Hamilton (surgeon) (died 1717), surgeon in the British East India Company
- Sir William Hamilton, 9th Baronet (1788–1856), Scottish metaphysician
- William B. Hamilton (1929–2012), Canadian historian
- Sir William Rowan Hamilton (1805–1865), Irish mathematician, physicist, and astronomer
- William Edwin Hamilton (1834–1902), son of William Rowan and publisher of his Elements of Quaternions (1866)
- William Hamilton (geologist) (1805–1867), English geologist
- William F. Hamilton (physician) (1893–1964), American physician
- William F. Hamilton (professor) (born 1941), professorship of management and technology
- William Hamilton (theologian) (1924–2012), American theologian
- W. D. Hamilton (1936–2000), British evolutionary biologist and geneticist
- Bill Hamilton (agricultural scientist) (1909–1992), New Zealand agricultural scientist and scientific administrator
- Willie Hamilton (doctor) (born 1958), expert in cancer diagnosis
- William Baskerville Hamilton (1908–1972), American historian

== Artists ==
- William Hamilton (painter) (1751–1801), English painter
- William Hamilton (cartoonist) (1939–2016), American cartoonist associated with The New Yorker

== Businessmen ==
- William Anthony Hamilton, founder of American computer company Inslaw
- William Hamilton (lumber baron) (died 1822), lumber merchant and political figure in Upper Canada
- Bill Hamilton (engineer) (1899–1978), New Zealand engineer and inventor
- William Hamilton and Company, British shipbuilding firm

== Criminals ==
- William Hamilton (criminal), criminal who shot at Queen Victoria in 1849
- Billy Ray Hamilton (1949–2007), American murderer

== Poets ==
- William Hamilton (comic poet) (1665–1751), Scottish poet
- William Hamilton (Jacobite poet) (1704–1754), Scottish poet associated with the Jacobite movement
- William Hamilton (British Army officer) (c. 1896–1917), poet and soldier from Victoria Barracks, Windsor

== Politics ==
=== Australasia ===
- William Hamilton (Australian politician) (1858–1920), Queensland politician
- William John Warburton Hamilton (1825–1883), administrator, explorer, and politician in New Zealand

=== Canada ===
- William Ernest Hamilton (1902–1985), Ontario politician
- William McLean Hamilton (1919–1989), Canadian politician

=== Ireland ===
- William Hamilton (died 1760), member of parliament for Londonderry City (Parliament of Ireland constituency)
- William Hamilton (died 1762), member of parliament for Strabane (Parliament of Ireland constituency)

=== United States ===
- William S. Hamilton (1797–1850), son of Alexander Hamilton, well-known miner, politician, and commander
- William W. Hamilton (1810–1866), English-born American politician from Iowa
- William D. Hamilton (Illinois politician) (in office 1850-1852), Illinois state representative
- William Hamilton (abolitionist) (1773–1836), abolitionist and orator
- William Hamilton (Flint politician) (died 1878), American politician
- William T. Hamilton (1820–1888), governor of Maryland (1880–1884)
- William J. Hamilton (1932–2019), American politician
- Bill Hamilton (West Virginia politician) (born 1950), American state legislator in West Virginia
- G. William Hamilton (1933-2022), American politician and businessman

=== United Kingdom ===
- William Hamilton (Lord Chancellor) (died 1307), Lord Chancellor of England
- Sir William Hamilton of Sanquhar (c. 1510–1570), pursemaster for James V
- William Hamilton, 2nd Duke of Hamilton (1616–1651), Scottish nobleman
- William Hamilton, Duke of Hamilton (1635–1694), Scottish nobleman
- William Gerard Hamilton (1729–1796), English statesman
- Sir William Hamilton (diplomat) (1730–1803), Scottish diplomat and husband of Emma Hamilton
- William Hamilton, 11th Duke of Hamilton (1811–1863), Scottish nobleman
- William Douglas-Hamilton, 12th Duke of Hamilton (1845–1895), Scottish nobleman
- Willie Hamilton (1917–2000), British Labour MP
- Lord William Hamilton (1700s–1734), member of parliament for Lanarkshire

== Sportspeople ==
- William Hamilton (cricketer) (1859–1914), Irish cricketer and footballer
- William Hamilton (cyclist) (1930–2017), Canadian Olympic cyclist
- William Hamilton (footballer) (1903–?), Scottish footballer
- Billy Hamilton (baseball, born 1866) (1866–1940), 19th century American Major League baseball player
- Billy Hamilton (baseball, born 1990) (born 1990), 21st century American Major League baseball player
- William Hamilton (tennis player) (1869–1943), Irish tennis player
- William Hamilton (sprinter) (1883–1955), 1908 Olympic gold medalist
- William Hamilton (sport shooter) (1884–1939), Canadian Olympic shooter
- William Hamilton (equestrian) (1921–2007), Swedish Olympic equestrian
- Willie Hamilton (footballer, born 1938) (1938–1976), Scottish footballer
- Willie Hamilton (footballer, born 1889) (1889–1921), Scottish footballer
- Bill Hamilton (rugby league) (born 1945), Australian rugby league footballer
- Billy Hamilton (footballer) (born 1957), Northern Irish footballer
- Pud Hamilton (William Hamilton, 1874–1965), Canadian ice hockey player
- William Hamilton (rugby union), Irish international rugby union player

== Others ==
- William Hamilton (antiquarian) (died 1724), Scottish topographer and genealogist, grandfather of William Gerard Hamilton
- William DaShawn Hamilton (1992– c. 1998), an American child whose skeletal remains were found under suspicious circumstances
- William Richard Hamilton (1777–1859), English antiquarian and traveler
- William Peter Hamilton (1867–1929), Wall Street Journal editor
- William Hamilton (film editor) (1893–1942), film editor
- Bill Hamilton, bassist for the Canadian band Silverstein
- William Hamilton (physician) (1758–1790), Scottish physician and botanist
- William Hamilton (Irish minister) (1755–1797), Irish Protestant minister, geologist, meteorologist and antiquarian
- William Thomas Hamilton (frontiersman) (1822–1908), English-born American frontiersman and author
- William Hamilton (actor), Irish stage actor of the eighteenth century
- William Hamilton (priest), Archdeacon of Armagh from 1700 to 1730
- William G. Hamilton (1932–2022), American physician
- Bill Hamilton (journalist), Washington editor for The New York Times
- Billy "Harp" Hamilton (born 1952), American singer, songwriter and harmonica-guitar player
- William Alexander Hamilton, III (born 1935), American writer, military officer and aviator
