= Colorado 1870–2000 =

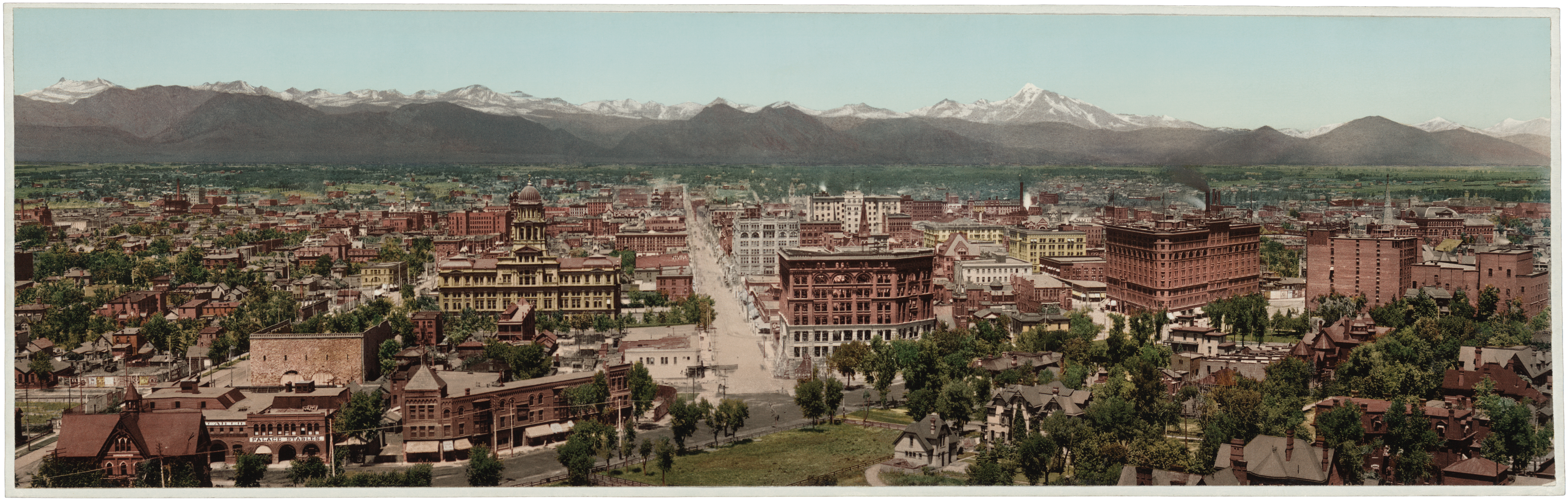
Denver, Colorado 1898. Photographer: William Henry Jackson. (example of Colorado photographs)

Colorado 1870–2000 is a pictorial history of frontier Colorado consisting of repeat photography by photographers William Henry Jackson and John Fielder. This book is also a collaboration with the Colorado Historical Society.

== Jackson - Nineteenth Century ==
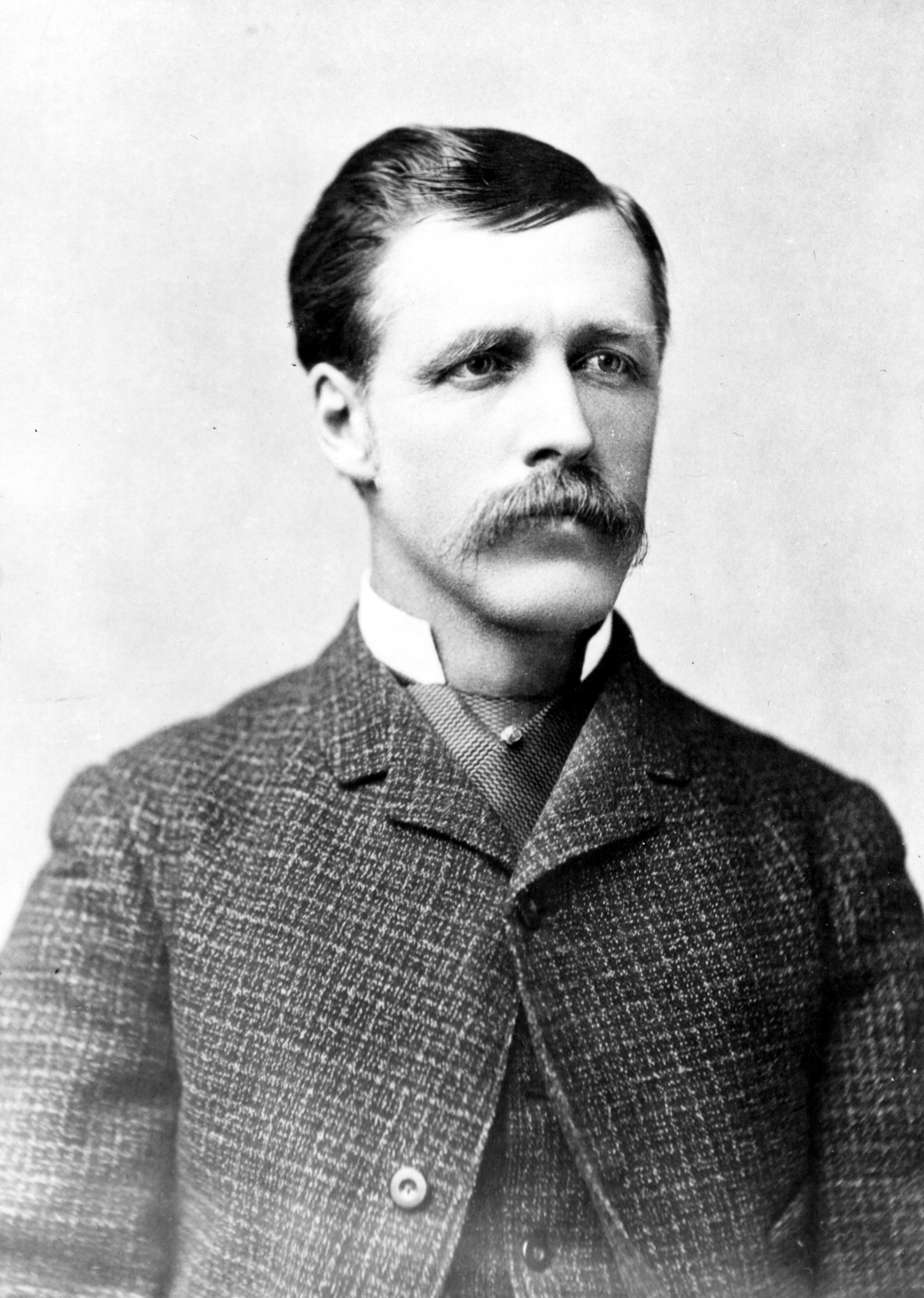
William Henry Jackson

Jackson started photographing Colorado for the Hayden Survey to map the West in 1870. Jackson owned his own photography studio in Denver, which enabled him to make contacts with railroad companies. Jackson traveled all over the Colorado territory and later, the state of Colorado, for over 30 years. He even climbed Rocky Mountains peaks that are over 14,000 feet high in to capture his photographs for the survey. Jackson's photographs also depict various Colorado geological characteristics such as boulders and creeks. Due to the lack of railroads, Jackson did not photograph the eastern plains and northwestern Colorado. Jackson later sold his business and the negatives from his photos to a photography company in Detroit when Colorado's economy declined in the late 1890s.

== Fielder - Twentieth Century ==
Fielder has a long history of being a nature photographer, with his focus primarily on landscapes and nature of Colorado. Fielder had his own collection of old photographs which gave him the idea to follow in the footsteps of another historical photographer of Colorado landscapes. Fielder worked with the Colorado Historical Society which had a large collection of Jackson's photographs taken a century earlier. The historical society liked Fielder's concept to rephotograph the areas of Colorado that Jackson had traveled to and worked in collaboration with Fielder for the project. Jackson took thousands of photographs throughout his Colorado travels so it was an enormous challenge for Fielder to narrow down 300 photos that he would rephotograph from 1997-1998. Fielder used Jackson's pictures to assist him with finding the location from Jackson's pictures, which often was a challenge since some geological landmarks changed over a century. Fielder photographed the same landmarks and scenery that Jackson using the same lighting and the same view as Jackson, only a century later. Fielder states that he could not find evidence left behind by Jackson of the spots where he took his photos, although other local photographers found imprints in the ground from Jackson's equipment. Colorado 1870-2000 is an easily recognizable hardcover brown volume of 156 Jackson-Fielder photographs. It was published in 1999 under Westcliffe Publishers, Fielder's own publishing company.

== Awards ==
Colorado 1870-2000 became a success with Colorado residents and is most widely known as Colorado Then and Now. It won the Colorado Humanitaries Colorado Book Award for non-fiction of Colorado/West in 1999. It was also named as Colorado's Tourism Website as one of the "10 Top Colorado History Reads.

== Related works ==
Colorado 1870-2000 Revisited, published in 2001, was a companion book to the original book providing additional information and history about the images. This book was a collaboration between Fielder and Thomas Noel. The final book of the Fielder-Jackson, Colorado 1870-2000 II was released in 2005. It contains the remaining photos that Fielder took on his quest to rephotograph Jackson.

Several other then and now books on Colorado have been published by various authors, many predating Fielder's work. Robert L. Brown produced three then and now books on Colorado ghost towns in the 1960s and early 1970s. Grant Collier retraced the steps of his great-great-grandfather, the pioneer photographer Joseph Collier, in his book Colorado: Yesterday & Today. More recently, Sandra Forty produced the book Colorado Past and Present.
