= Briles =

Briles is a surname. Notable people with the name include:

- Art Briles (born 1955), American football player and coach
- Herschel F. Briles (1914–1994), US Army soldier
- James E. Briles (1926–1992), American politician
- Judith Briles, American author
- Kendal Briles (born 1982), American football player and coach
- Nelson Briles (1943–2005), American baseball player
