= Penny Rafferty Hamilton =

American aviator

- Born: Penny Rafferty; February 18, 1948 (age 78); Pennsylvania, US
- Education: AA dental hygiene education, Temple University, 1968, BA, education, Columbia College, 1976; MS, adult and continuing education, University of Nebraska–Lincoln, PhD, communications, University of Nebraska–Lincoln
- Known for: Teaching Women to Fly Research Project (2008–2010)
- Spouse: William Alexander Hamilton III.
- Awards: Colorado Aviation Hall of Fame, 2011; Colorado Women's Hall of Fame, 2014; Colorado Authors' Hall of Fame, 2021
- Website: pennyhamilton.com

Penny Rafferty Hamilton (born February 18, 1948) is an American retired pilot, aviation educator, writer, and photographer. She is noted for her two-year study of women in aviation, the Teaching Women to Fly Research Project, which identified barriers to women training as pilots and presented 101 strategies to increase the participation of women in aviation. She also interests children in aviation, giving talks in schools and libraries as the character "Penny the Pilot". She and her husband jointly hold a World Aviation Speed Record set in 1991. In addition to writing for aviation magazines, she has published books on the history of Granby, Colorado, where she resided from 1989-2024. She was inducted into the Colorado Aviation Hall of Fame in 2011, the Colorado Women's Hall of Fame in 2014, and the Colorado Authors Hall of Fame in 2021.

== Early life, education, and career ==
Penny Rafferty was born on February 18, 1948, in Pennsylvania. She earned an associate of arts degree in dental hygiene education from Temple University in 1968 and her bachelor's degree in education from Columbia College in 1976.

She began working as a dental hygienist in a preventative dental clinic which she managed in Rhode Island, where she met her husband, a career military officer. Together they lived in different locations in the US and abroad, including Germany. Upon his retirement in 1979, they settled in Nebraska. They both attended the University of Nebraska–Lincoln, where she earned a master's degree in adult and continuing education and a PhD in communications. She submitted her thesis on "The Dental Hygienist: The First Half-Century, 1913 to 1963".

Hamilton worked as a professor of communications at the University of Nebraska–Lincoln while writing an advice column for the Sun Newspapers chain. She also hosted a radio program, and appeared weekly on television. Later she and her husband purchased a newspaper and opened a management consultancy and public relations business called Advanced Research Institute. One of their clients was the Aircraft Owners and Pilots Association.

== Aviation activities ==
Hamilton became interested in flying after serving as a navigation and radio controller for her husband. She received her pilot's license in 1988. On October 22, 1991, the couple flew from Lincoln, Nebraska to New Orleans, Louisiana, at a speed of 179.92 miles per hour (289.55 km/h), completing the trip in 4 hours and 39 minutes. They set a World Aviation Speed Record for their weight class, which still stands. The record was verified by the Fédération Aéronautique Internationale and the National Aeronautic Association. She retired from flying in 2007.

With an estimated 6 percent of licensed pilots in the US being women (in the UK the figure is less than 9 percent), Hamilton decided to promote the idea of flying to women and girls. Her first initiative was to interest children in aviation by giving talks in schools and library groups. She appears as the character "Penny the Pilot", dressing up in the vintage flying gear of famed woman aviator Amelia Earhart. In 2009, she received the 7 Everyday Hero Award from The Denver Channel for this initiative, and was similarly honored with the Federal Aviation Administration's Central Region Aviation Education Champion Award.

Hamilton solicited a grant from the Wolf Aviation Fund to launch the Teaching Women to Fly Research Project in 2008. This two-year study queried women flight students and pilots, and male flight instructors, to identify what prevented women from pursuing flight training. Hamilton identified ten barriers to women entering the field, including: lack of money, a perceived indifference to women students on the part of flight training schools, lack of continuity as flight instructors leave their jobs and new ones take over the class, communication difficulties between women and male flight instructors, lack of female role models, unfamiliarity with mechanical systems, lack of experience with reading maps, lack of female mentorship, and lack of emotional support from friends and family. She also proposed 101 strategies to overcome these barriers, among them: "the creation of low-interest loan programs for women in colleges and universities, web-based support communities for female pilots, and developing female friendly flight training to emphasize different learning styles and strengths". The study led to the compilation of a textbook titled Absent Aviators: Gender Issues in Aviation (Ashgate, 2014), to which Hamilton contributed a chapter, and to a planned flight instructors communication manual.

Hamilton was a co-founder of the Emily Warner Field Aviation Museum, which opened in July 2015 in the former Rocky Mountain Airways terminal in the Grand County Airport. From 2018-2024, she volunteered as the team leader at the museum on behalf of the Grand County Historical Association. She was also the volunteer director of the Colorado Airport History Preservation Project. In Idaho, she volunteers for several aviation organizations.

== Writing ==
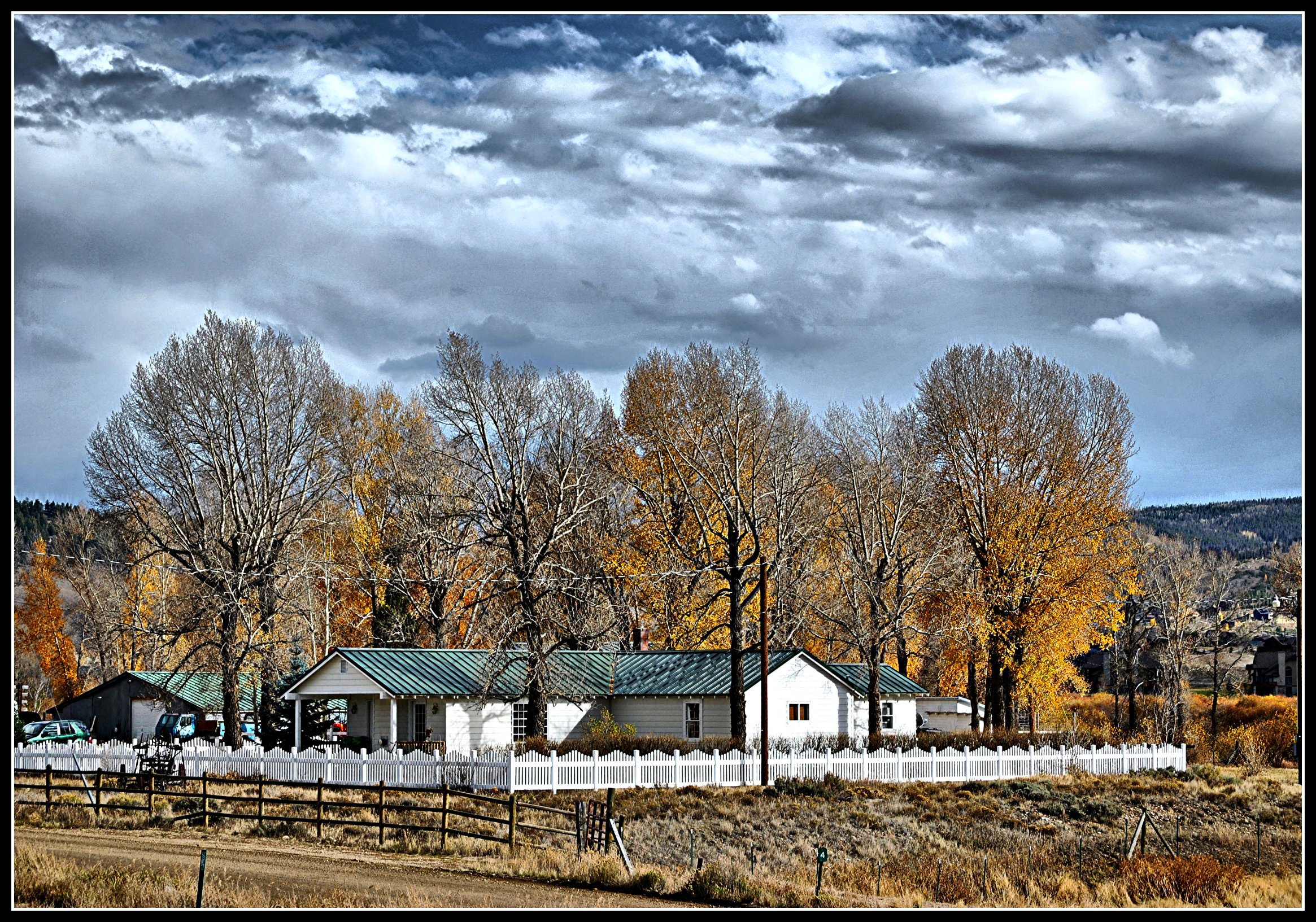
Granby, Colorado

Hamilton is a frequent contributor to aviation magazines, and has written two flight instruction manuals for women pilots. She also writes articles on the history of Grand County and the town of Granby, where she resided from 1989-2024. She wrote and photographed a history of Around Granby for Arcadia Publishing's "Images of America" series, a local history book called Granby, Then & Now: A quick history (2005), and a book for young children, A to Z: Your Grand County History Alphabet (2017). She wrote the national aviation career and history book called "America's Amazing Airports" in 2019. Hamilton's book Inspiring Words for Sky and Space Women: Advice from Historic and Contemporary Trailblazers was published in 2020. Her book 101 Trailblazing Women of Air and Space: Aviators and Astronauts was published in 2021. She wrote Grand County for the "Images of America" series for Arcadia Publishing in 2023.

== Memberships ==
Hamilton was a member of the Aircraft Owners and Pilots Association, for which she served as an Airport Support Network Volunteer from 1997-2022. She was previously a member of the Colorado Pilots Association, the Colorado Aviation Historical Society, the Spirit of Flight Center, the Wings Over the Rockies Air and Space Museum, the National and Colorado 99s, and Women in Aviation International.

== Awards and honors ==
In 1994, a new holding intersection in the US aeronautical system, located at an altitude of 15,500 feet above sea level and west of Corona Pass, Colorado, was named for her by the Federal Aviation Administration.

In 2011, Hamilton received a Lifetime Achievement Award from the Greater Granby Area Chamber of Commerce. In 2012 she received the National Aviation Journalist Award from the National Association of State Aviation Officials. That year, she was the national winner of the Eli Lilly Oncology on Canvas award with her oil on canvas art titled "Oncology Odyssey." In 2013, she was honored with the Columbia College Distinguished Alumni Award for "outstanding regional and national career recognition". In 2015, Hamilton was awarded the University of Nebraska Alumni Achievement Award. In 2019, she was named Grand County, Colorado, Citizen of the Year.

She was inducted into the Colorado Aviation Hall of Fame in 2011 and the Colorado Women's Hall of Fame in 2014. In 2013, her name was engraved on a plaque in the International Forest of Friendship in Atchison, Kansas. Hamilton is featured on the cover of the 2014 book Absent Aviators: Gender Issues in Aviation.

In 2018, she was featured in a 30-minute documentary segment of the inaugural edition of the Rocky Mountain PBS series Great Colorado Women, which profiles inductees into the Colorado Women's Hall of Fame.

She was inducted into the Colorado Authors Hall of Fame in 2021.

== Personal life ==
In 1971, she married William Alexander Hamilton, III (born 1935), a career military officer. His postings took the couple to Washington, D.C., Germany and other locales; after his retirement in 1978, they settled in Nebraska. He has written a syndicated column since 1982. The couple lived in Granby, Colorado, from 1989-2024. They now reside in Meridian/Boise, Idaho.

In 2015, Hamilton was diagnosed with breast cancer for the second time, having survived a previous diagnosis in 2007.

== Bibliography ==
=== Books ===
- A to Z: Your Grand County History Alphabet. Grand County Historical Association. 2017. ISBN 978-0692833216.
- Around Granby. Arcadia Publishing. 2013. ISBN 978-1-4671-3045-5.
- Granby, Then & Now: A quick history. Greater Granby Chamber of Commerce. 2005. ISBN 978-1599752730.
- America's Amazing Airports: Connecting Communities to the World. Independently Published. 2019. ISBN 9781699237656.
- Inspiring Words for Sky and Space Women: Advice from Historic and Contemporary Trailblazers. Mountaintop Legacy Press. 2020. ISBN 9780578789996.
- Trailblazing Women of Air and Space: Aviators and Astronauts. Mountaintop Legacy Press. 2021. ISBN 9780578322377.
- Grand County. Arcadia Publishing. 2023. ISBN 9781467108973.

=== Selected articles ===
- "What's in a Name?: A guide to Grand County's historic namesakes". Ski-Hi News. December 4, 2018.
- "Life Changer – The Horrific Story of FedEx Flight 705". State Aviation Journal. October 30, 2011.
- "Majestic Scenery and Great Golf Beckoning Pilots to Beautiful Grand County, Colorado". SW Aviator. January 2004.
- "Lessons Learned in Our Family's Alzheimer's Odyssey" (PDF). AFA Care Quarterly: 4–5. Fall 2017.
