= John Fielder =

American photographer and conservationist (1950–2023)

- Born: August 2, 1950
- Died: August 11, 2023 (aged 73)
- Occupation: photographer

John Fielder (August 2, 1950 – August 11, 2023) was an American landscape photographer, nature writer, the publisher of over 40 books, and a conservationist. He was nationally known for his landscape photography, scenic calendars (which have been published for over 30 years) and for his many coffee table books and travel guides—including Colorado's best-selling Colorado 1870–2000, in which he matched the same scenes of classic photographs taken in the 19th century by photographer William Henry Jackson.

== Biography ==
John Fielder was born on August 2, 1950. A Washington, DC, native, Fielder moved to Colorado upon graduation from Duke University, where he studied accounting. After working eight years for department stores, he turned his photography hobby into a profession.

Fielder married his wife, Virginia, in 1978. The couple became parents of three children.

Fielder won the Colorado Book Award three times, in 1996, 1997, and 2000. His photos were published in more than 50 books.

In January 2023, Fielder released the entirety of his over 5,000 photographs into the public domain, with History Colorado as caretaker.

Fielder worked to promote the protection of Colorado open space and wild lands. His photography influenced people and legislation, including the Colorado Wilderness Act of 1993, and earned him recognition, including the Sierra Club's Ansel Adams Award in 1993, and in 2011, the Aldo Leopold Foundation's first Achievement Award given to an individual. He was an original governor-appointed member of the lottery-related board of Great Outdoors Colorado, and spoke to thousands of people each year to rally support for land use and environmental issues.

John Fielder died from pancreatic cancer on August 11, 2023, at the age of 73.

== Posthumous recognition ==
On January 24, 2026, Amber McReynolds, Chair of the Board of Governors of the United States Postal Service, and Colorado Governor Jared Polis unveiled the Colorado statehood sesquicentennial postage stamp at the History Colorado Center in Denver. The forever stamp was designed by USPS art director Derry Noyes and features a photograph of 13,826-foot (4,214 m) Jagged Mountain in the Weminuche Wilderness by Colorado nature photographer John Fielder.

== Exhibitions ==
- Colorado History Museum: Colorado 1870-2000, then and now, II, September 2005-April 2006, Denver, Colorado
- The Wildlife Experience, permanent exhibit, Parker, Colorado

== Awards ==
- Ansel Adams Award for Conservation Photography, 1993
- Colorado Book Award, 1996, 1997, 2000
- National Outdoor Book Award (Design and Artistic Merit), Mountain Ranges of Colorado, 2005
- National Outdoor Book Award (Outdoor Adventure Guidebook), Colorado's Continental Divide Trail, 1998

== Published works ==
- Colorado's Highest: The History of Naming the 14,000-Foot Peaks (coauthored with Jeri L. Norgren), Silverthorne, Colo.: John Fielder Publishing, ISBN 1-73444-292-1.
- Colorado 1870-2000 (2000) Boulder, Colo.: Westcliffe Publishers ISBN 1-56579-347-1.
- Colorado 1870-2000 II (2005) Boulder, Colo.: Westcliffe Publishers, ISBN 1-56579-566-0.
- Colorado 1870-2000 Revisited (2001), coauthored with Thomas J. Noel, Boulder, Colo.: Big Earth Publishing, ISBN 1-56579-389-7, ISBN 978-1-56579-389-7.
- Mountain Ranges of Colorado Boulder, Colo.: Westcliffe Publishers, ISBN 1-56579-496-6.
- To Walk in Wilderness (coauthored with T.A. Barron), Boulder, Colo.: Westcliffe Publishers, ISBN 1-56579-038-3.
- Along the Colorado Trail (coauthored with M. John Fayhee), Boulder, Colo.: Westcliffe Publishers, ISBN 1-56579-010-3.
- Colorado: Lost Places and Forgotten Words Boulder, Colo.: Westcliffe Publishers, ISBN 0-942394-88-7
- John Fielder's Best of Colorado Boulder, Colo.: Westcliffe Publishers, ISBN 1-56579-429-X.
- The Complete Guide to Colorado's Wilderness Areas (coauthored with Mark Pearson)
- A Colorado Winter Boulder, Colo.: Westcliffe Publishers, ISBN 1-56579-289-0.
- Photographing the Landscape Boulder, Colo.: Westcliffe Publishers, ISBN 1-56579-228-9.

== See also ==
- List of Colorado state symbols
- List of mountain peaks of Colorado
