= William Henry Jackson =

American photographer and painter (1843–1942)

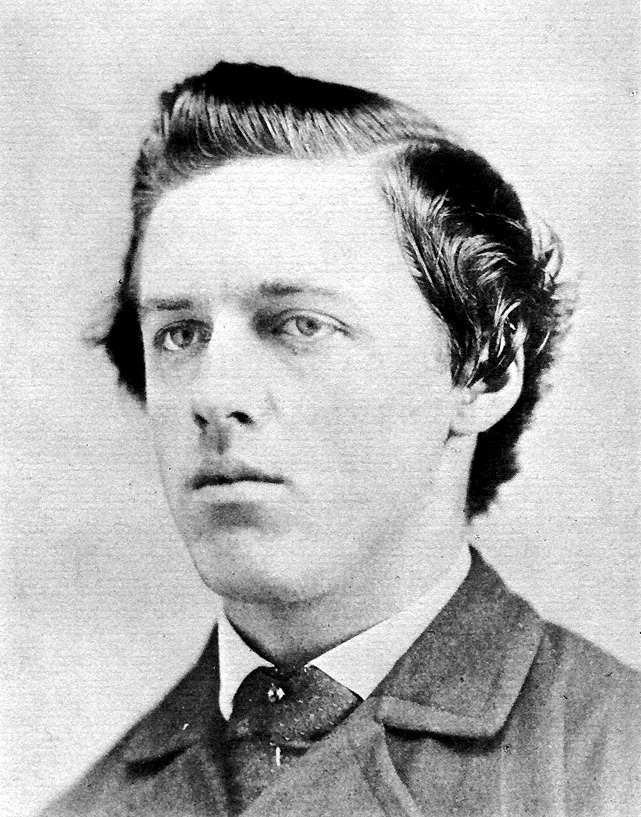
- Jackson in 1862
- Born: April 4, 1843; Keeseville, New York, U.S.
- Died: June 30, 1942 (aged 99); New York City, U.S.
- Resting place: Arlington National Cemetery, Arlington, Virginia
- Occupations: Photographer; Painter
- Known for: "Mountain of the Holy Cross" photo

William Henry Jackson (April 4, 1843 – June 30, 1942) was an American photographer, Civil War veteran, painter, and an explorer famous for his images of the American West. He was a great-great nephew of Samuel Wilson, the progenitor of America's national symbol Uncle Sam. He was the great-grandfather of cartoonist Bill Griffith, creator of Zippy the Pinhead comics.

== Early life ==
Jackson was born in Keeseville, New York, on April 4, 1843, the first of seven children born to George Hallock Jackson and Harriet Maria Allen. Harriet, a talented water-colorist, was a graduate of the Troy Female Seminary, later the Emma Willard School. Painting was William's passion from a young age. By age 19, he had become a skillful, talented artist of American pre-Civil War visual arts. Orson Squire Fowler wrote that Jackson was "excellent as a painter".

After his childhood in Troy, New York, and Rutland, Vermont, Jackson enlisted in October 1862 as a 19-year-old private in Company K of the 12th Vermont Infantry of the Union Army. Jackson spent much of his free time sketching drawings of his friends and various scenes of Army camp life that he sent home to his family as his way of letting them know he was safe. He served in the American Civil War for nine months including one major battle, the Battle of Gettysburg. Jackson spent most of his tour on garrison duty and helped guard a supply train during the engagement. His regiment mustered out on July 14, 1863. Jackson then returned to Rutland, where he worked as an artistic painter in post-Civil War American society. Having broken his engagement to Miss Carolina Eastman, he left Vermont for the American West.

In 1866 Jackson boarded a Union Pacific Railroad train and traveled until it reached the end of the line at that time, about one hundred miles west of Omaha, Nebraska, where he then joined a wagon train heading west to Great Salt Lake as a bullwhacker, on the Oregon Trail. In 1867 along with his brother Edward Jackson he settled down in Omaha and entered the photography business. On ventures that often lasted for several days, Jackson acted as a "missionary to the Indians" around the Omaha region, and it was there that Jackson made his now famous photographs of the American Indians: Osages, Otoes, Pawnees, Winnebagoes and Omahas.

== Career as photographer ==
=== Union Pacific expedition ===
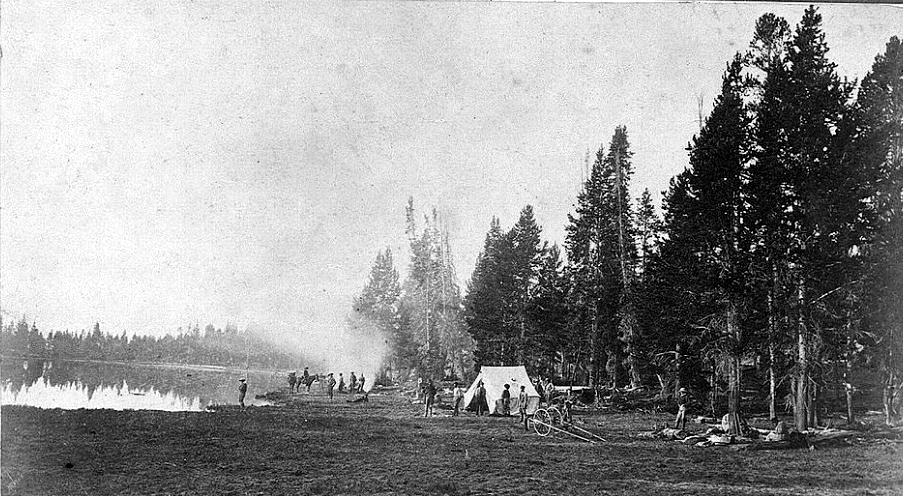
Survey Camp, Yellowstone National Park, 1871. Photo by William Henry Jackson

In 1869 Jackson won a commission from the Union Pacific to document the scenery along the various railroad routes for promotional purposes. When his work was discovered by Ferdinand Hayden, who was organizing a geologic survey to explore the Yellowstone River region, he was asked to join the expedition.

The following year, he got a last-minute invitation to join the 1870 U.S. government survey (predecessor of U.S. Geological Survey) of the Yellowstone River and Rocky Mountains led by Ferdinand Hayden. He also was a member of the Hayden Geological Survey of 1871 which led to the creation of Yellowstone National Park. Painter Thomas Moran was also part of the expedition, and the two artists worked closely together to document the Yellowstone region. Hayden's surveys (usually accompanied by a small detachment of the U.S. Cavalry) were annual multidisciplinary expeditions meant to chart the largely unexplored west, observe flora (plants), fauna (animals), and geological conditions (geology), and identify likely navigational routes, so as official photographer for the survey, Jackson was in a position to capture the first photographs of legendary landmarks of the West. These photographs played an important role in convincing Congress in 1872 to establish Yellowstone National Park, the first national park of the U.S. His involvement with Hayden's survey established his reputation as one of the most accomplished explorers of the American continent. Among Hayden's party were Jackson, Moran, geologist George Allen, mineralogist Albert Peale, topographical artist Henry Elliot, botanists, and other scientists who collected numerous wildlife specimens and other natural data.

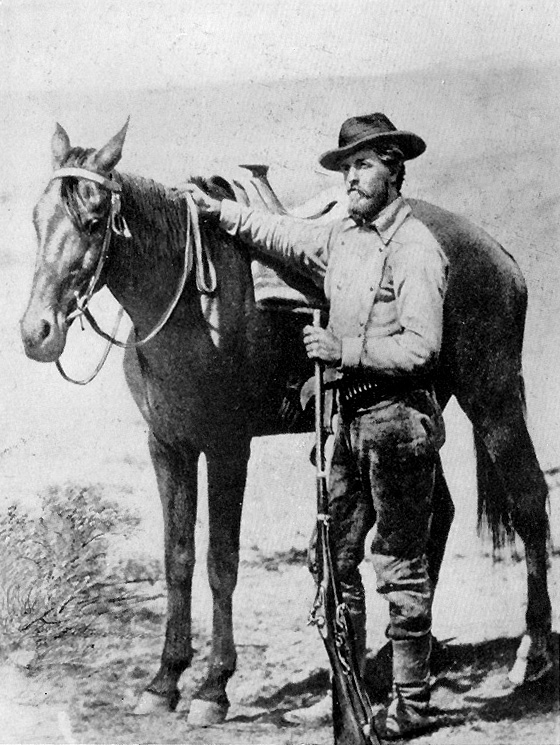
William Henry Jackson, as a member of the U. S. Geological Survey exploring the Teton country in 1872

Jackson worked in multiple camera and plate sizes, under conditions that were often incredibly difficult. His photography was based on the collodion process invented in 1848 and published in 1851 by Frederick Scott Archer. Jackson traveled with as many as three camera-types—a stereographic camera (for stereoscope cards), a "whole-plate" or 8x10" plate-size camera, and one even larger, as large as 18x22". These cameras required fragile, heavy glass plates (photographic plates), which had to be coated, exposed, and developed onsite, before the wet-collodion emulsion dried. Without light metering equipment or sure emulsion speeds, exposure times required inspired guesswork, between five seconds and twenty minutes depending on light conditions.

Preparing, exposing, developing, fixing, washing then drying a single image could take the better part of an hour. Washing the plates in 160 °F hot spring water cut the drying time by more than half, while using water from snow melted and warmed in his hands slowed down the processing substantially. His photographic division of 5 to 7 men carried photographic equipment on the backs of mules and rifles on their shoulders. Jackson's life experience (for example his military service, and his peaceful dealings with Indians) was welcomed. The weight of the glass plates and the portable darkroom limited the number of possible exposures on any one trip, and these images were taken in primitive, roadless, and physically challenging conditions. Once when the mule lost its footing, Jackson lost a month's work, having to return to untracked Rocky Mountain landscapes to remake the pictures, one of which was his celebrated view of the Mount of the Holy Cross.

Despite the delays and setbacks Jackson returned with conclusive photographic evidence of the various western landmarks that had previously seemed only a fantastic myth: the Tetons, Old Faithful and the rest of the Yellowstone region, Colorado's Rockies and the Mount of the Holy Cross, and the uncooperative Ute Indians. Jackson's photographs of Yellowstone helped convince the U.S. Congress to make it the first national park in March 1872.

=== Work in Colorado ===
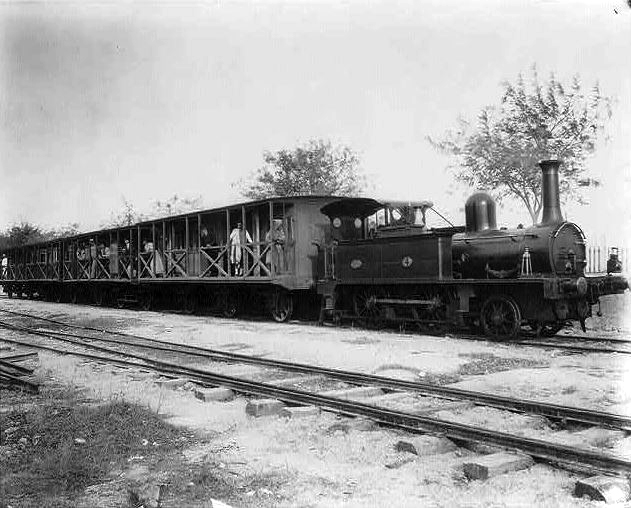
Photo by W.H. Jackson Railway train of the Italian Line, Marsa, 1894

Jackson exhibited photographs and clay models of Ancestral Puebloan dwellings at Mesa Verde in Colorado in the 1876 Centennial Exposition in Philadelphia. He continued traveling on the Hayden Surveys until the last one in 1878. He later established a studio in Denver, Colorado, and produced a huge inventory of national and international views. He incorporated himself as W.H. Jackson Photograph and Publishing Company in 1883. Commissioned to photograph for western state exhibitions at the World's Columbian Exposition of 1893 in Chicago, he eventually produced a final portfolio of views of the just-shuttered "White City" for Director of Works and architect Daniel Burnham. The Denver Public Library has about 3,000 of Jackson's photographs in its collection, which include many photographs of picturesque Colorado landscapes and railroad scenes.

=== Railroad line commissions ===
From 1890 to 1892 Jackson produced photographs for several railroad lines (including the Baltimore and Ohio (B&O) and the New York Central) using 18 x 22-inch glass plate negatives. The B&O used his photographs in their exhibit at the World's Columbian Exposition.

=== World's Transportation Commission ===
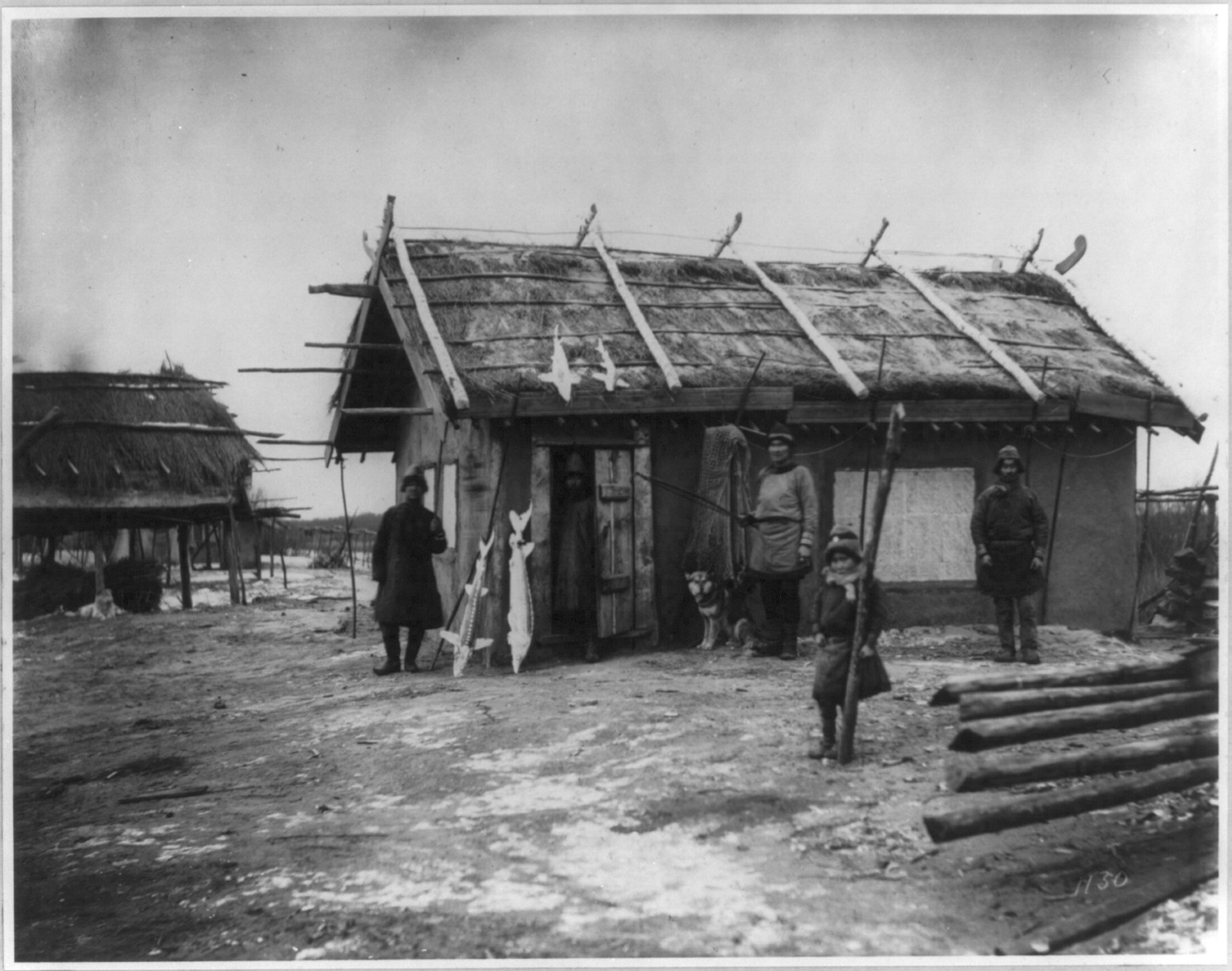
Goldi village along the Amur River, north of Khabarovsk in southeastern Russia, 1895

From 1894 to 1896 Jackson was a member and photographer for the World's Transportation Commission, organized by Joseph Gladding Pangborn, a publisher for the Railroad. The purpose of the trip was to document traditional and novel forms of transportation internationally, though many photographs did incorporate the local environment and people.

Commission members left New York on September 25, 1894, and traveled across the world. They visited North Africa, the Middle East, India and Australia, then moved on to East Asia, Russia, Europe, East Africa, then finally South and Central America before returning home to the US. Jackson produced more than 900 photographs for the commission, which are now part of a collection on display at the Library of Congress.

== Career as a painter ==
Jackson was a prodigy as a painter in his youth, and during his lifetime produced many paintings of the American west. Jackson's mother was also an accomplished painter of water colors, and he credited her for her encouragement with his success as a painter. His first job as an artist was in 1858. He was hired as a retoucher for a photography studio in Troy, New York, where he worked for two years. Scotts Bluff National Monument in Nebraska houses the largest collection of William Henry Jackson paintings in the world. During the last decade of his life Jackson returned to illustrating.

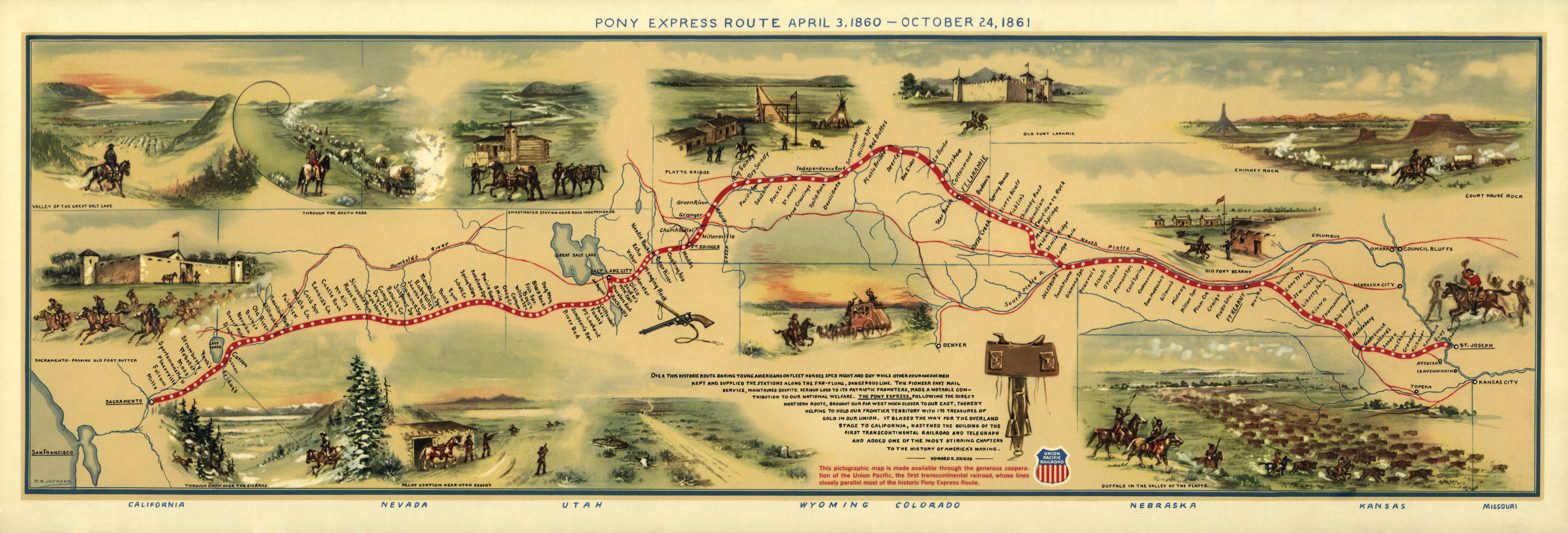
Map of Pony Express Route in 1860, created by William Henry Jackson c. 1935 (Courtesy Library of Congress)

== Career as publisher ==
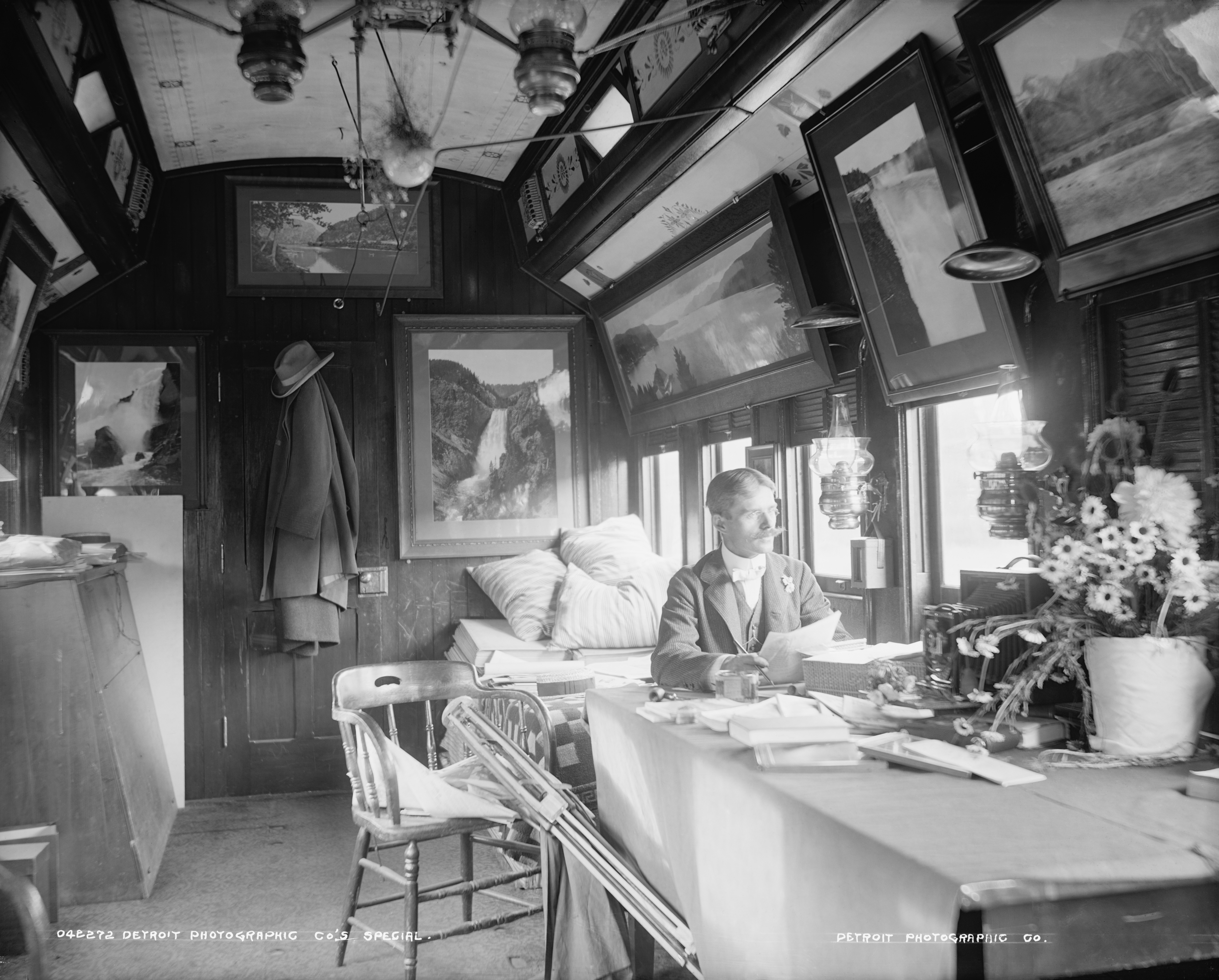
Jackson aboard the Detroit Photographic Co. Special train, 1902.

Thrust into financial exigencies by the Panic of 1893, Jackson accepted a commission by Marshall Field to travel the world photographing and gathering specimens for a vast new museum in Chicago; his pictures and reports were published by Harper's Weekly magazine. He returned to Denver and shifted into publishing; in 1897 he sold his entire stock of negatives and his own services to the Detroit Publishing Company (formerly called the Detroit Photographic Company, owned by William A. Livingstone), after the company had acquired the exclusive ownership and rights to the photochrom process in America. Jackson joined the company in 1898 as president – just when the Spanish–American War gained the nation's fervent interest – bringing with him an estimated 10,000 negatives which provided the core of the company's photographic archives, from which they produced pictures ranging from postcards to mammoth-plate panoramas.

In 1903, Jackson became the plant manager, thus leaving him with less time to travel and take photographs. In 1905 or 1906, the company changed its name from the Detroit Photographic Co. to the Detroit Publishing Co.

In the 1910s, the publishing firm expanded its inventory to include photographic copies of works of art, which were popular educational tools as well as inexpensive home decor.

During its height, the Detroit Publishing Company drew upon 40,000 negatives for its publishing effort, and had sales of seven million prints annually. Traveling salesmen, mail order catalogues, and a few retail stores aggressively sold the company's products. The company maintained outlets in Detroit, New York, Los Angeles, London, and Zurich, and also sold their images at popular tourist spots and through the mail. At the height of its success, the company employed some forty artisans and a dozen or more traveling salesmen. In a typical year they would publish an estimated seven million prints.

With the declining sale of photographs and postcards during World War I, and the introduction of new and cheaper printing methods used by competing firms, the Detroit Publishing Company went into receivership in 1924, and in 1932 the company's assets were liquidated.

Today, Jackson's Detroit photographs are housed at the U.S. Library of Congress. This collection of photographs includes more than 25,000 glass negatives and transparencies along with some 300 color photolithograph prints, mostly of the eastern United States. The Jackson/Detroit collection also includes a small group that includes some 900 Mammoth Plate photographs that were taken along several railroad lines in the United States and Mexico in the 1880s and 1890s. The collection also includes views of California, Wyoming and the Canadian Rocky Mountains.

In 1936 Edsel Ford, backed by his father Henry Ford, bought Jackson's 40,000 negatives from Livingstone's estate for "The Edison Institute", known today as The Henry Ford in Dearborn, Michigan. Eventually, Jackson's negatives were divided between the Colorado Historical Society (views west of the Mississippi), and the Library of Congress Prints and Photographs Division (all other views).

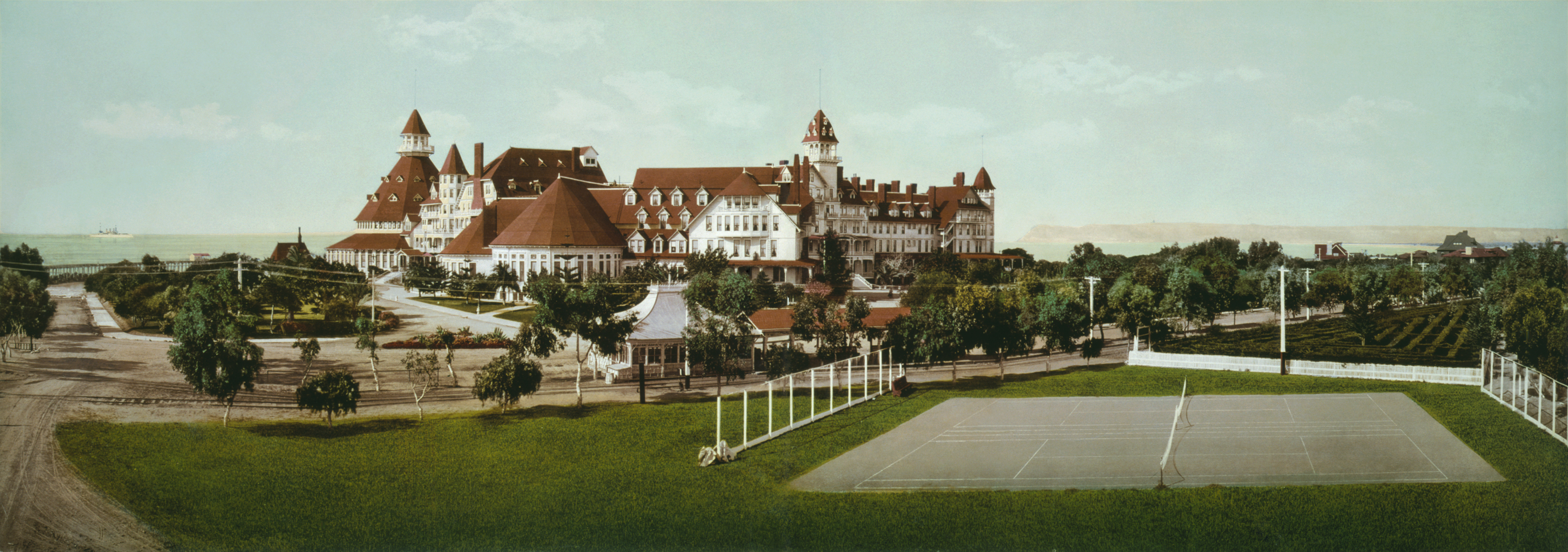
Restored photochrom print of Hotel del Coronado in Coronado, California, by William Henry Jackson for the Detroit Publishing Company, c. 1900.

== Later life ==
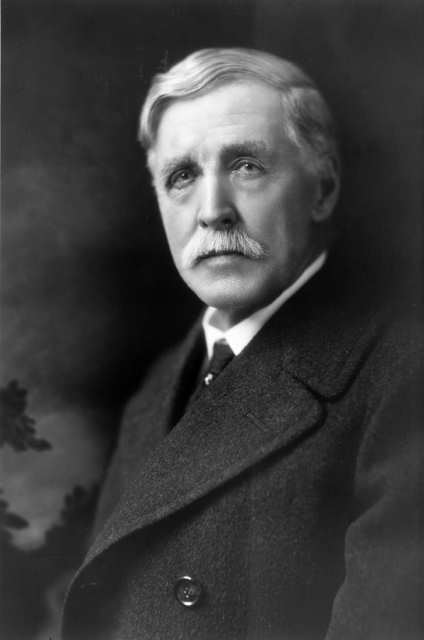
Jackson in later life

Jackson moved to Washington, D.C., in 1924, and produced murals of the Old West for the new U.S. Department of the Interior building. He also acted as a technical advisor for the filming of Gone with the Wind.

William Henry Jackson also attended the 75th anniversary commemoration and the 1938 Gettysburg reunion, in July 1938.

In 1942, Jackson died at the age of 99 in New York City. He was honored by the Explorers Club for his 80,000 photographs of the American West. He was also memorialized by the Adventurers' Club of New York, of which he was an active member. The SS William H Jackson steamship was in active service in 1945. Recognized as one of the last surviving Civil War veterans, he was buried at Arlington National Cemetery.

Mount Jackson el. 8,231 feet (2,509 m) just north of the Madison River, in the Gallatin Range of Yellowstone National Park is named in honor of Jackson.

In 1982 Jackson was inducted into the International Photography Hall of Fame and Museum.

== Gallery ==
Media related to William Henry Jackson at Wikimedia Commons

Works of William Henry Jackson
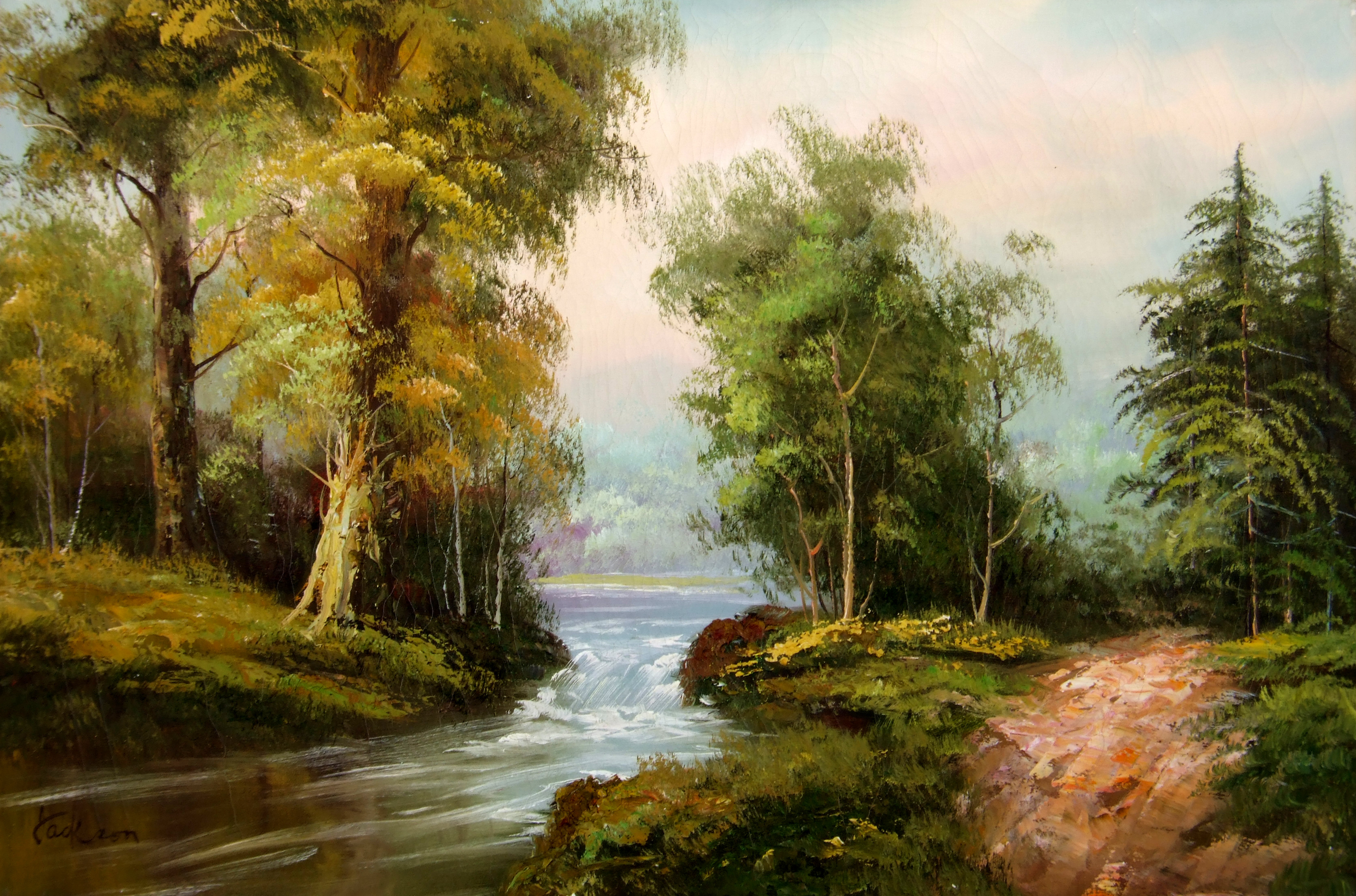
Muddy Pond, Rutland VT, 1861. Oil painting, 36' x 24', Vermont.

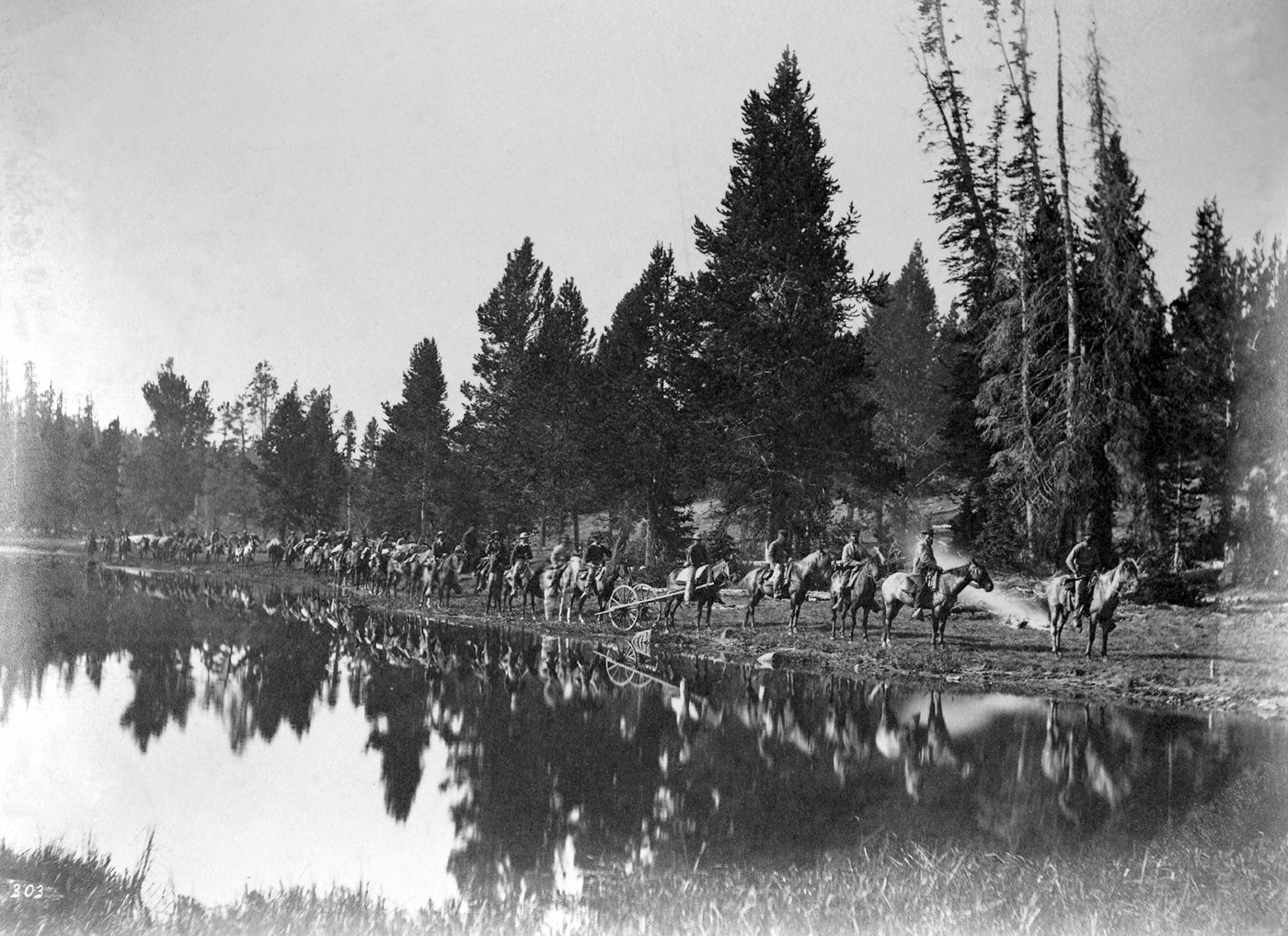
F.V. Hayden Expedition, Wyoming.

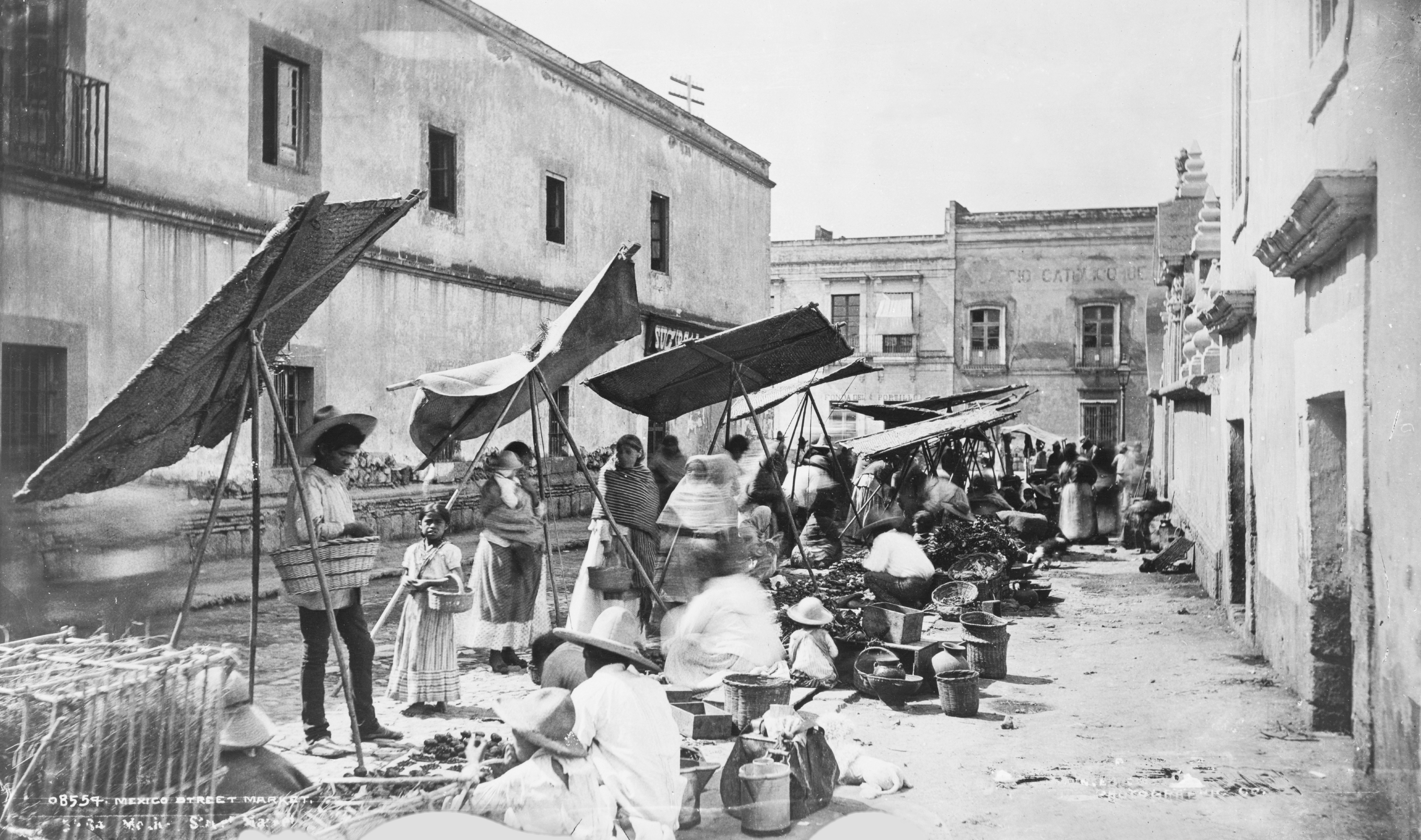
A street market in Mexico City, 1884–1885.

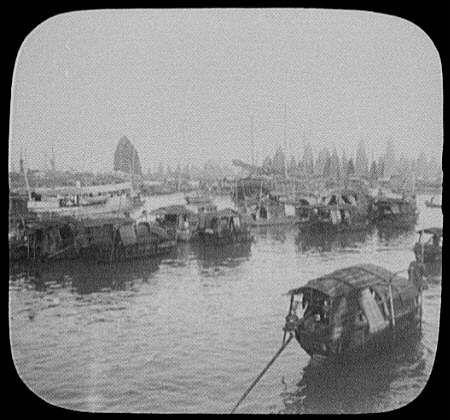
Canton harbor crowded with sampans.

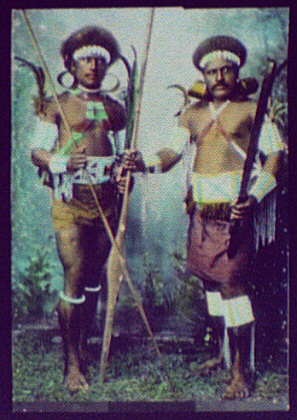
Solomon Islands warriors, 1895.

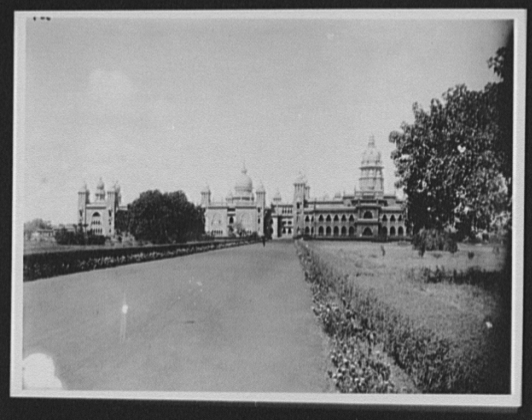
Madras, India, 1895.

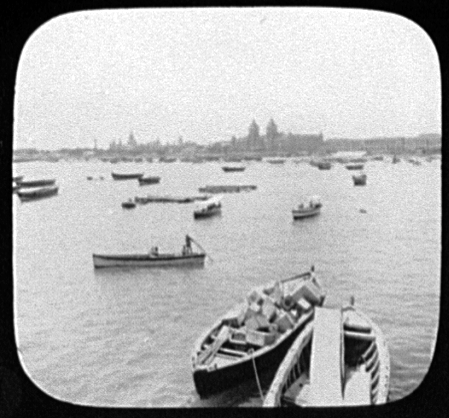
Harbor in Madras, India, 1895.

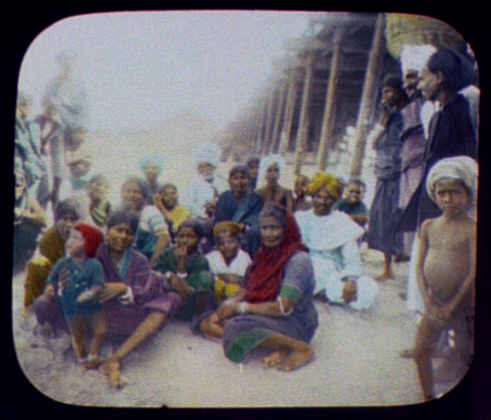
Group of Tamil natives at the pier, 1895.

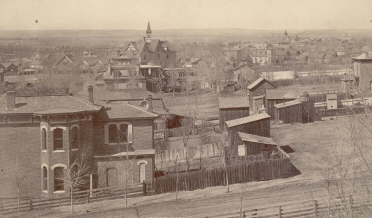
Denver, Colorado, 1885.

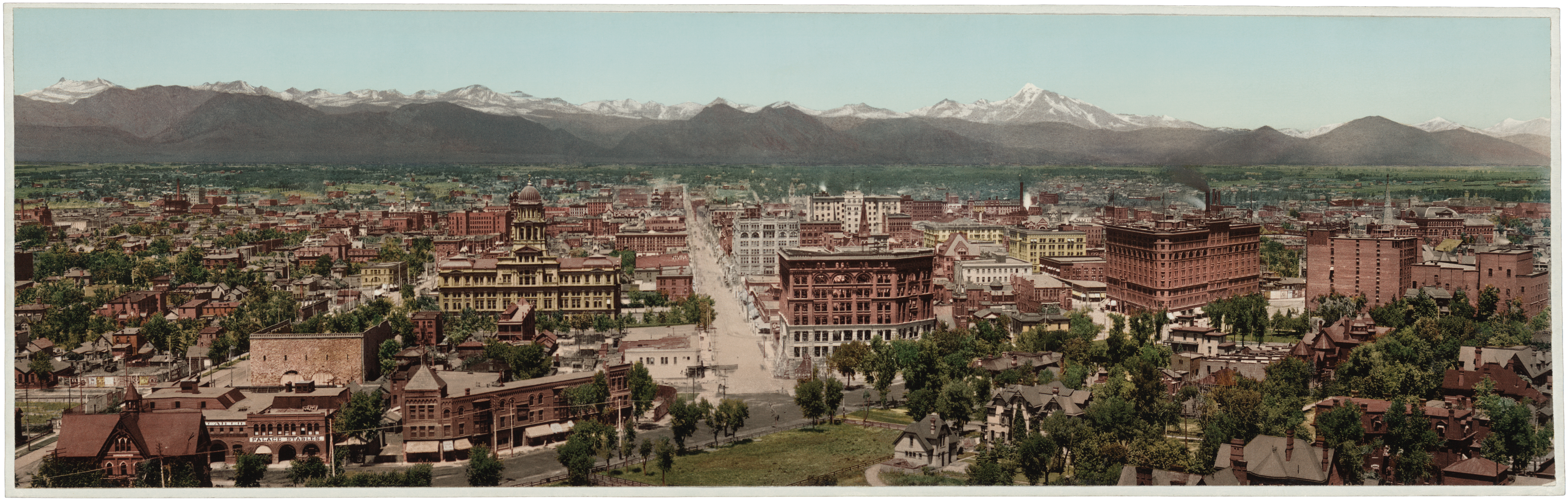
Denver, Colorado, 1898.

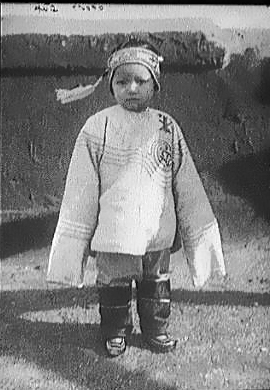
Chinese American child in embroidered jacket, 1900.

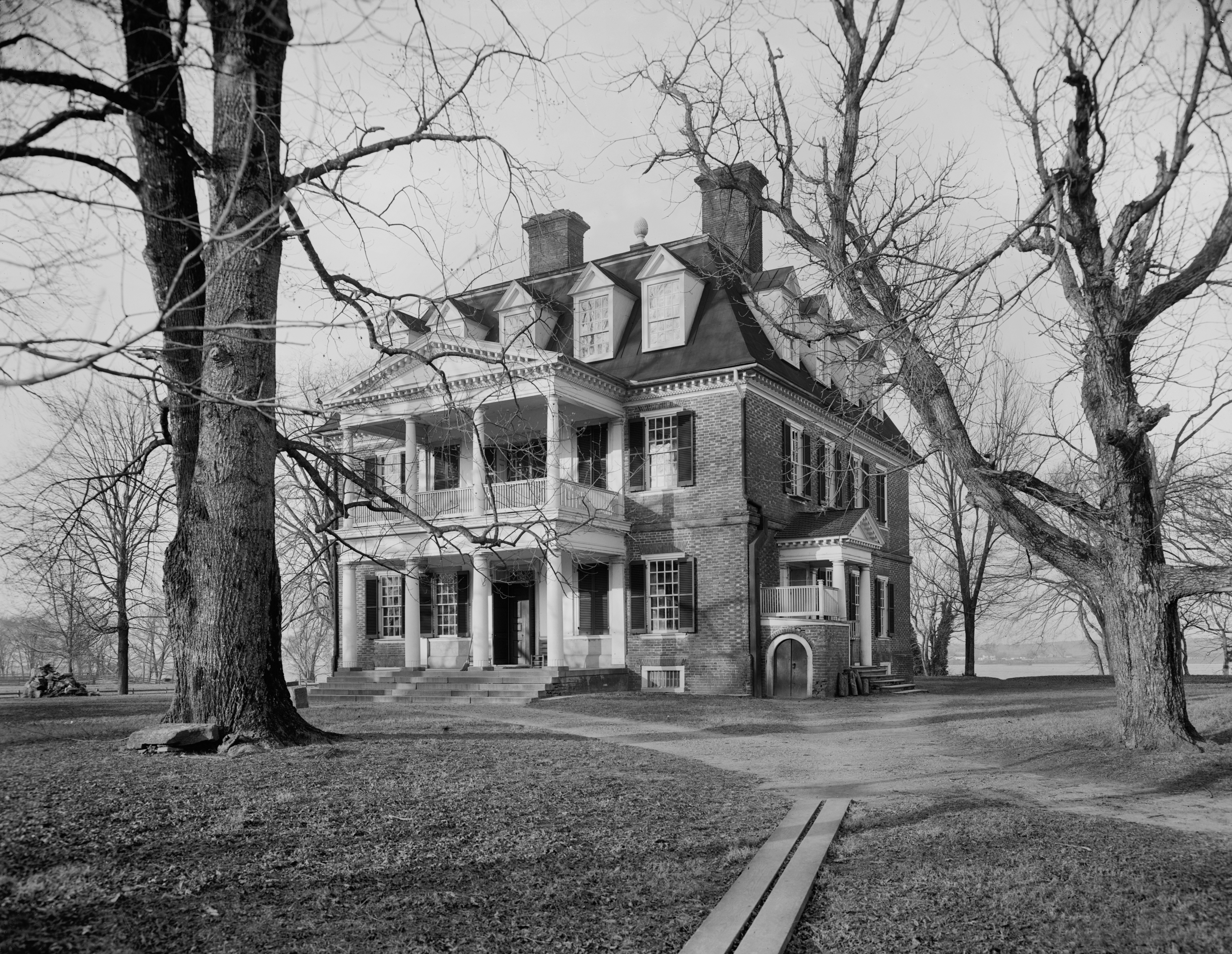
Shirley Plantation, James River, Virginia, 1900–1906.

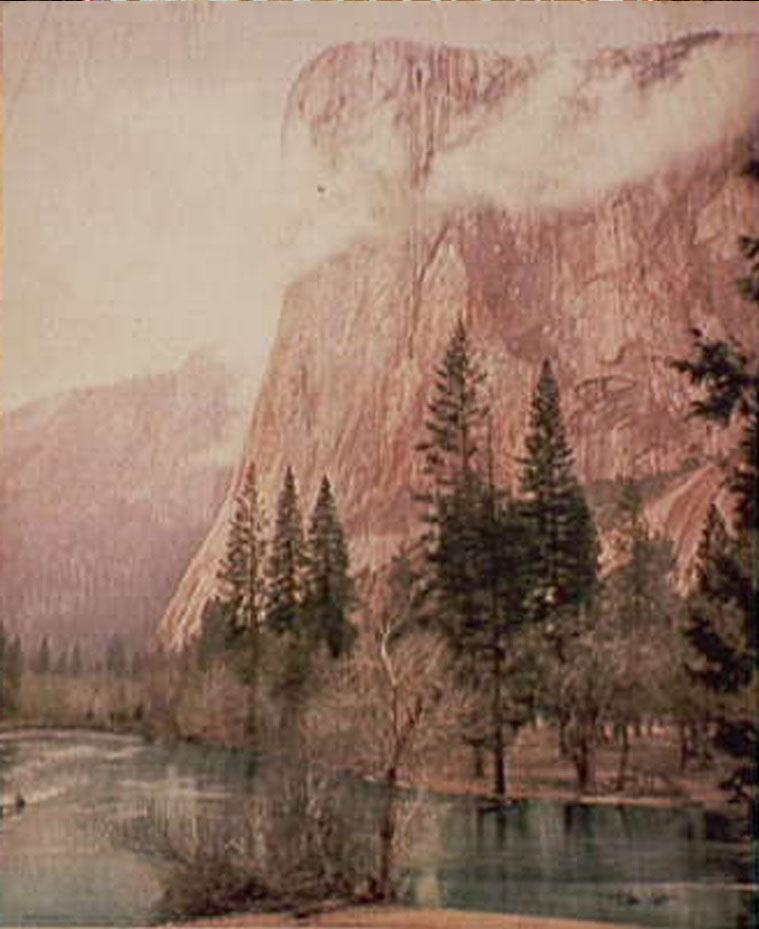
1899 photograph of El Capitan.

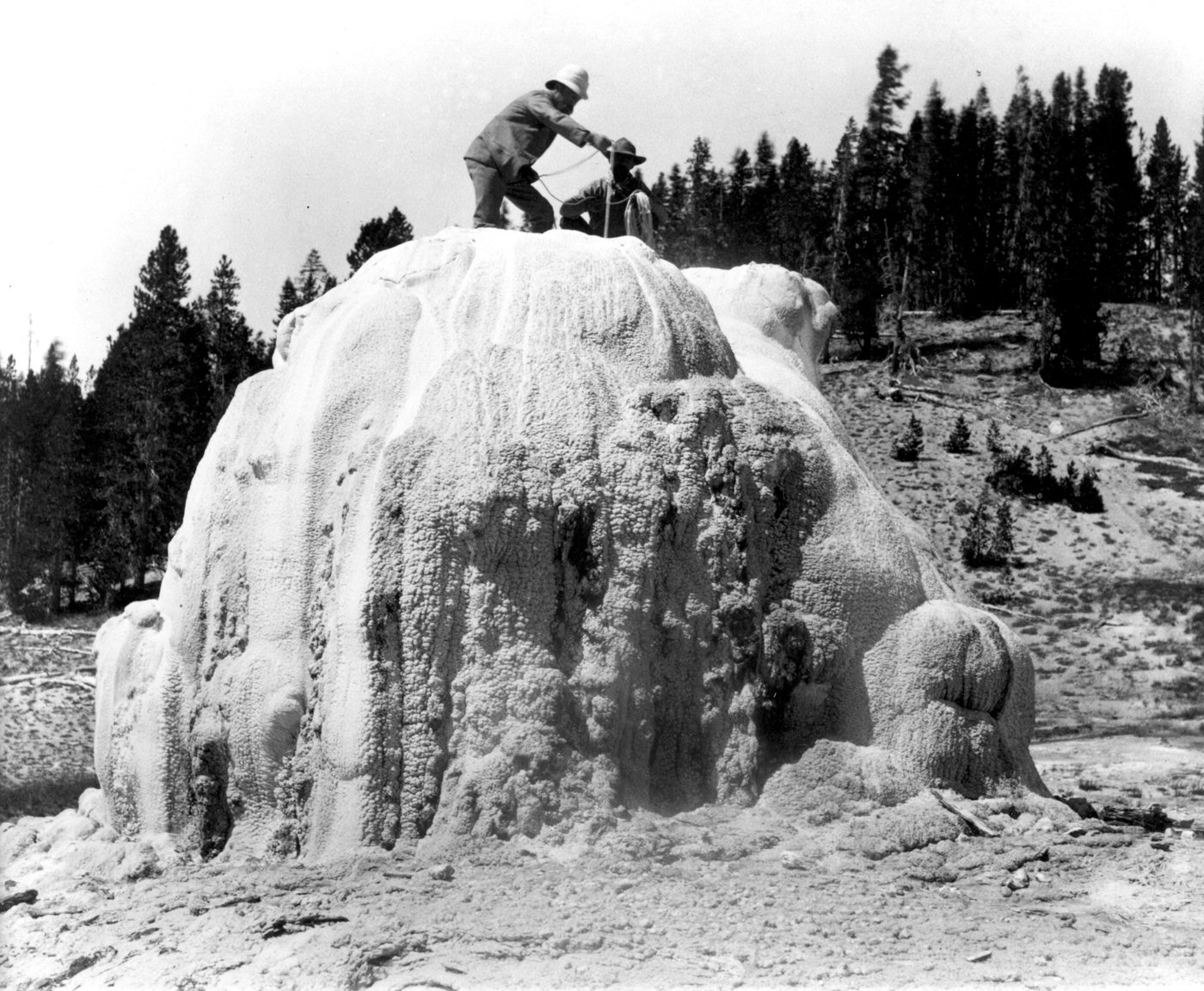
Lone Star Geyser, Yellowstone, 1878.

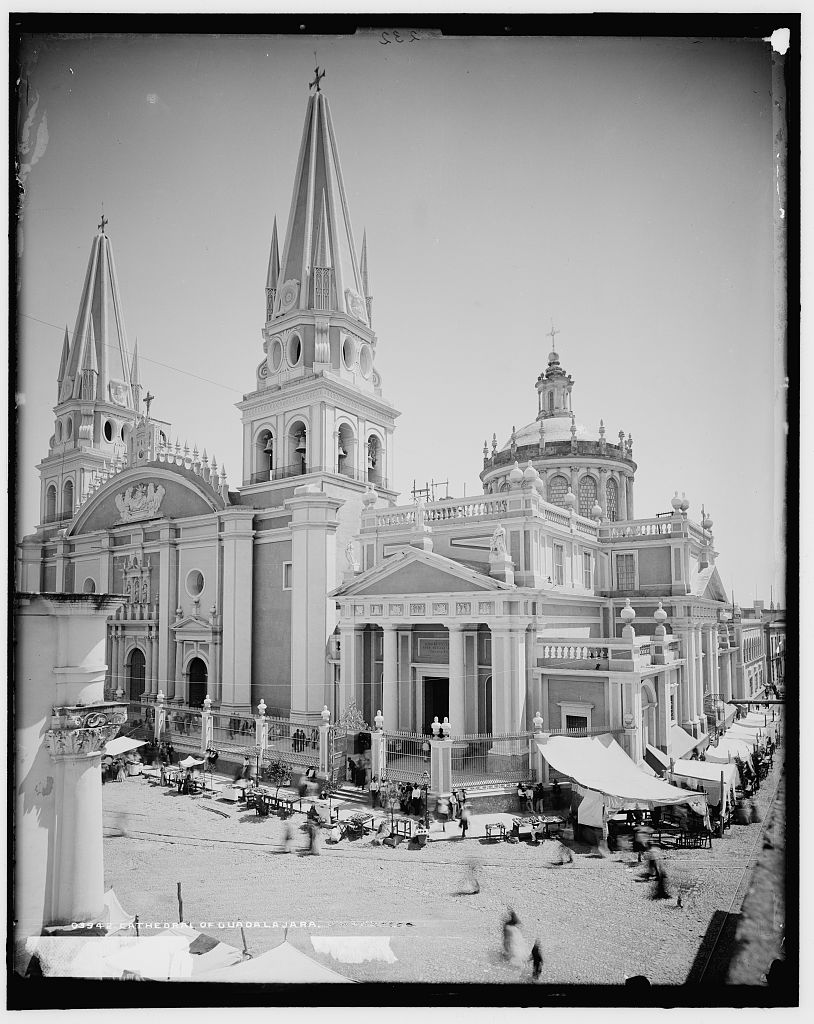
Guadalajara Cathedral

== See also ==
- Adventurers' Club of New York
- Hovenweep National Monument
- Colorado 1870–2000
