= Berit Bertling =

Norwegian novelist (born 1966)

- Born: 1966 (age 59–60); Trondheim, Norway
- Other name: Berit Bertling Cappelen
- Occupation: Novelist

Berit Bertling Cappelen (born 1966) is a Norwegian novelist. She lives in Oslo. She was twice denied admittance to the Norwegian Authors' Association.

== Works ==
Olwyns saga series

1. Forrådt, Cappelen, 2004
2. Jomfrurov, Cappelen, 2004
3. Dødskysset, Cappelen, 2004
4. Skyggespill, Cappelen, 2005
5. Fortapt, Cappelen, 2005
6. Maktbegjær, Cappelen, 2005
7. Flukt, Cappelen, 2005
8. Fare, Cappelen, 2005
9. Sverdslag, Cappelen, 2005
10. Ravnetid, Cappelen, 2006

Solsiden saga,

1. Sort diamant, Cappelen, 2005
2. Isdronning, Cappelen, 2005
3. Purpursommerfugl, Cappelen, 2005
4. Kråkesølv, Cappelen, 2005
5. Snøroser, Cappelen, 2006
6. Fløyelsløgner, Cappelen, 2006
7. Gnistregn, Cappelen, 2006
8. Blonde dager, Cappelen, 2006
9. Fremtidsminner, Cappelen, 2006
10. Stjernestøv, Cappelen, 2006
- Milla og stallkrigen, Aschehoug, 2009, ISBN 978-82-03-25157-3
- Milla og midnattsmysteriet, Aschehoug, 2009, ISBN 978-82-03-25155-9
