= Judith Briles =

American businessman

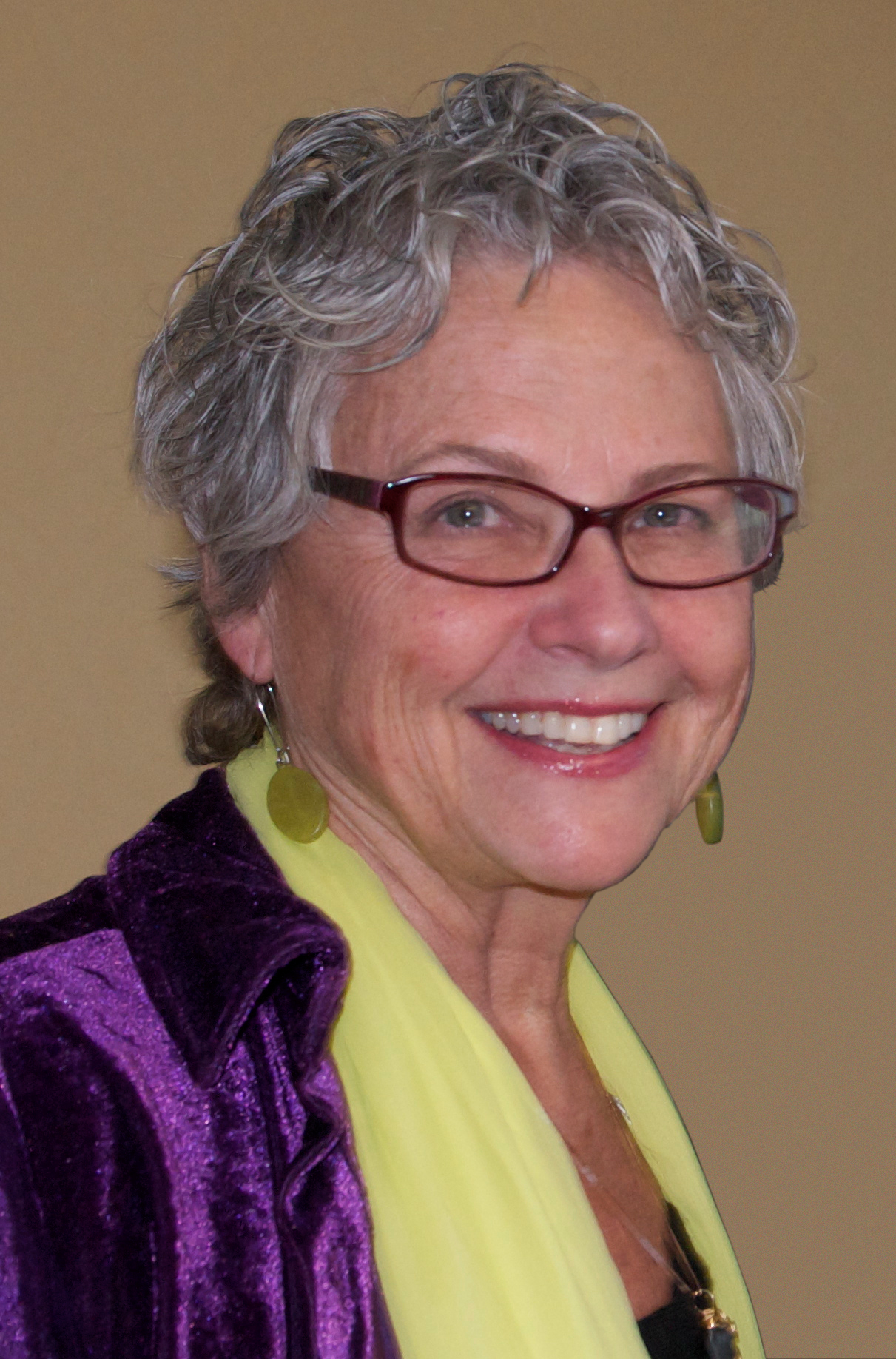
- Book Publishing Expert – Inspirational Book Coach
- Born: Los Angeles, California
- Education: Pepperdine University; Nova SE University
- Occupations: Author, publishing expert
- Employer: The Book Shepherd
- Known for: author and publishing advocate
- Website: TheBookShepherd.com

Judith Briles is an author of fiction and nonfiction. She is the CEO of Mile High Press, a book publishing consultant known as The Book Shepherd, podcaster, and professional speaker focused in the fields of book publishing, conflict resolution, and personal finance.

She is best known for being The Book Shepherd and the founder of AuthorYOU, the co-founder of Mile High Press, and was CW2 Denver's financial expert in the mid-2000s. Briles has been referred to as " The Book Shepherd" and is an advocate for author's rights, works with clients globally and leads the Book Publishing and Speaking Unplugged bootcamps. In 2019, She launched the Colorado Authors Hall of Fame. In 2025, She was named an Author Laureate by American Book Fest.

== Background ==
Briles has earned both masters and doctorate of Business Administration degrees. In 2004, she was named the Woman of Distinction by the Girl Scouts of the United States of America.

== Career ==
Briles is a Book Publishing Expert and Inspirational Book Coach. She is the founder of Mile High Press, Ltd., an independent press, The Briles Group, Inc., a former Colorado-based research, training and consulting firm, and The Book Shepherd, Inc. She is the President of The Book Shepherd, a consulting and implementation firm that works with authors and small publishers that was created in 2000 educating and assisting authors globally in the creation and successful publication of their books. In 2009, she founded AuthorU, a nonprofit 501(c)6 membership organization for authors. She founded the 501(c)3 Colorado Authors Hall of Fame with its first induction to twenty-one authors in September 2019.

Briles is an author of over forty-eight books, earning over sixty book awards, including her publishing series that features the latest titles in 2025: The Author's Walk, How to Avoid Book Publishing Blunders. How to Create a Million Dollar Speech, Snappy Sassy Salty Success for Authors and Writers, How to Create Crowdfunding Success for Authors and Writers, Cooking with Judith, The Secret Journey, The Secret Hamlet, The Secret Rise, When Gods Says NO plus ''How to Create a $1,000,000 Speech, AuthorYOU-Creating and Building Your Author and Book Platforms, The CrowdFunding Guide for Authors & Writers, How to Avoid 101 Book Publishing Blunders Bloopers & Boo-Boos, How to Create a $1,000,000 Speech and Snappy Sassy Salty-Wise Words for Authors & Writers. Show Me About Book Publishing with Rick Frishman and John Kremer, The Confidence Factor and Stabotage. She also travels internationally as a motivational speaker.

Her pioneering work on women and sabotage, specifically on how and why women undermine other women and the toxic workplace has been featured in The Wall Street Journal, Time, People, USA Today, Self, McCalls, Working Woman, Family Circle, The Washington Post, Newsweek and The New York Times. She is a frequent guest on national television and radio and has appeared on programs including CNN, CNNfn, Oprah, John Gray, Joan Rivers, Donahue, MSNBC and Good Morning America.

== Select bibliography ==
- Briles, Judith (1987). Woman to Woman: From Sabotage to Support. Far Hills, NJ: New Horizons Press. pp. 298 pages. ISBN 978-0882821719.
- Briles, Judith (2000). Smart-Money Moves for Kids. Denver, CO: Mile High Press. pp. 316 pages. ISBN 978-1885331038.
- Briles, Judith (2005). Money Smarts: Personal Financial Success in 30 Days!. Denver, CO: Mile High Press. pp. 288 pages. ISBN 978-1885331199.
- Briles, Judith (2008). Zapping Conflict in the Health Care Workplace. Denver, CO: Mile High Press. pp. 414 pages. ISBN 978-1885331083.
- Briles, Judith (2008). The Confidence Factor: Cosmic Gooses Lay Golden Eggs. Denver, CO: Mile High Press. pp. 176 pages. ISBN 978-1885331090.
- Briles, Judith (2008). Stabotage!: How to Deal with the Pit Bulls, Skunks, Snakes, Scorpions & Slugs in the Health Care Workplace. Denver, CO: Mile High Press. pp. 192 pages. ISBN 978-1885331304.
- Briles, Judith (2013). Author YOU-Creating and Building Your Author and Book Platforms. Denver, CO: Mile High Press. pp. 232 pages. ISBN 978-1885331410.
- Briles, Judith (2014). Snappy Sassy Salty: Wise Words for Authors & Writers. Denver, CO: Mile High Press, pp 144 pages. ISBN 978-1885331496.
- Briles, Judith (2015). The Crowdfunding Guide for Authors & Writers. Denver, CO: Mile High Press, pp 92 pages. ISBN 978-1885331571.
- Briles, Judith (2016). How to Avoid 1010 Book Publishing Blunders, Bloopers & Boo-Boos. Denver, CO: Mile High Press, pp 328 pages. ISBN 978-1885331601.
- Briles, Judith (2018). How to Create a $1,000,000 Speech. Denver, CO: Mile High Press, pp 298 pages. ISBN 978-1885331670.
- Briles, Judith (2019). When God Says NO: Revealing the YES When Adversity and Loss Are Present. Denver, CO: Mile High Press, pp 264 pages. ISBN 978-1885331731.
