= Patricia Raybon =

American author and journalist

Patricia Raybon is an American author and journalist. Her essays have been published in The New York Times Magazine, Newsweek, USA Today, USA Weekend, Chicago Tribune, The Denver Post, and Rocky Mountain News, and reprinted in several college textbooks. She previously taught journalism at the University of Colorado Boulder.

== Literary career ==
Raybon's first book was My First White Friend: Confessions on Race, Love, and Forgiveness, published by Viking in 1996. She describes her experiences growing up in a predominantly white suburb of Denver and reflects on the intersection of faith and racial healing in her life. Publishers Weekly commented that the "confessional has the intimate voice of hard-won honesty", and while a reviewer for Kirkus Reviews felt that certain aspects of the book were not fully explored, they praised it as "a universal testament to the power of reaching out and moving on". The book received a Christopher Award in 1997.

In her 2005 book I Told the Mountain to Move, published by Tyndale, Raybon recounts her relationship with prayer throughout her life, contained in a series of 24 lessons. It received praise from Publishers Weekly, which described it as "a powerful and personal book about prayer". With her daughter Alana, she co-authored Undivided: A Muslim Daughter, Her Christian Mother, Their Path to Peace, published by Thomas Nelson in 2015. The book describes Alana's conversion to Islam, the ensuing estrangement between Alana and Patricia, and their eventual reconciliation.

In 2021, Raybon's novel All That Is Secret was published by Tyndale. The story centers on Annalee Spain, a Black woman in the 1920s who investigates her father's murder in Denver. In a review for The Denver Post, Sandra Dallas described Annalee's character as "a welcome addition to a genre that is dominated by white women and hard-boiled men". All That Is Secret received the 2022 Christy Award in the First Novel category. The second novel in the Annalee Spain series, Double the Lies, is set to be published by Tyndale in February 2023.
