= Emily Howell Warner =

American aviator (1939–2020)

- Warner, c. early 1970s
- Born: Emily Joyce Hanrahan; October 30, 1939; Denver, Colorado, U.S.
- Died: July 3, 2020 (aged 80); Littleton, Colorado, U.S.
- Known for: First U.S. woman airline captain
- Spouses: Stanley Howell (m. 1963; div. 1965) Julius Warner (m. 1976; died 2012)
- Children: 1

Emily Joyce Howell Warner (née Hanrahan; October 30, 1939 – July 3, 2020) was an American airline pilot and the first woman captain of a scheduled U.S. airline.

In 1973, Warner was the first woman pilot to be hired by a scheduled U.S. airline since Helen Richey was hired as a co-pilot in 1934. In 1976 Warner was the first woman to become a U.S. airline captain. Her career has been recognized by multiple halls of fame, including the National Aviation Hall of Fame and National Women’s Hall of Fame. Her pilot’s uniform is on display at the Smithsonian's National Air and Space Museum.

In addition to piloting, Warner was a flight school manager in Denver, Colorado. She was a flight instructor and FAA designated flight examiner holding multiple ratings. She flew more than 21,000 flight hours and performed more than 3,000 check rides and evaluations over her career. Warner died in 2020 from complications of a fall and Alzheimer's disease.

== Early life ==
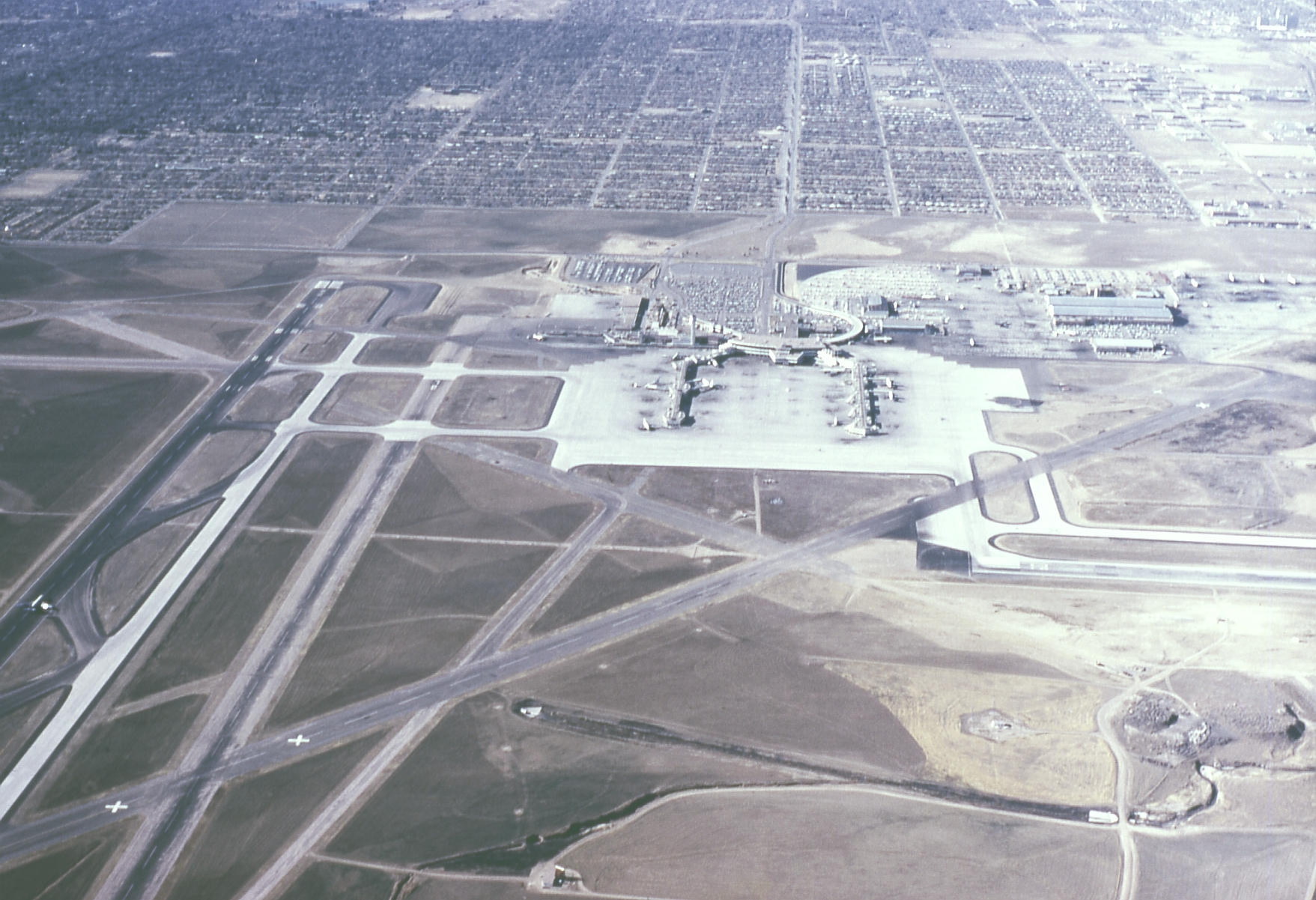
Stapleton Airport as seen from the air in 1966. This is where Howell Warner took flying lessons and was her base of employment for decades.

Emily Howell Warner was born on October 30, 1939, to Emily Violet Boyd and John W. Hanrahan. She attended Holy Family High School in Colorado. Warner was interested in airplanes as a child. After graduating high school she looked into becoming a flight attendant.

At seventeen, she decided on a career in piloting after her first trip on an airplane. She was allowed to sit in the cockpit of a plane flying her home after a trip away from Denver. Warner said, “The pilot could see how excited I was and he encouraged me to take flying lessons. I replied: ‘Can girls do that?’” She started flying in 1958, after getting the approval of her parents for lessons. The lessons cost thirteen dollars per week; at that time she had a thirty-eight dollar per week paycheck. She sometimes worked fourteen hours a day, with a morning flight, a full-time office job, and an evening flight. She obtained her private pilot license and got a job as a flying traffic reporter within a year.

== Clinton Aviation years ==
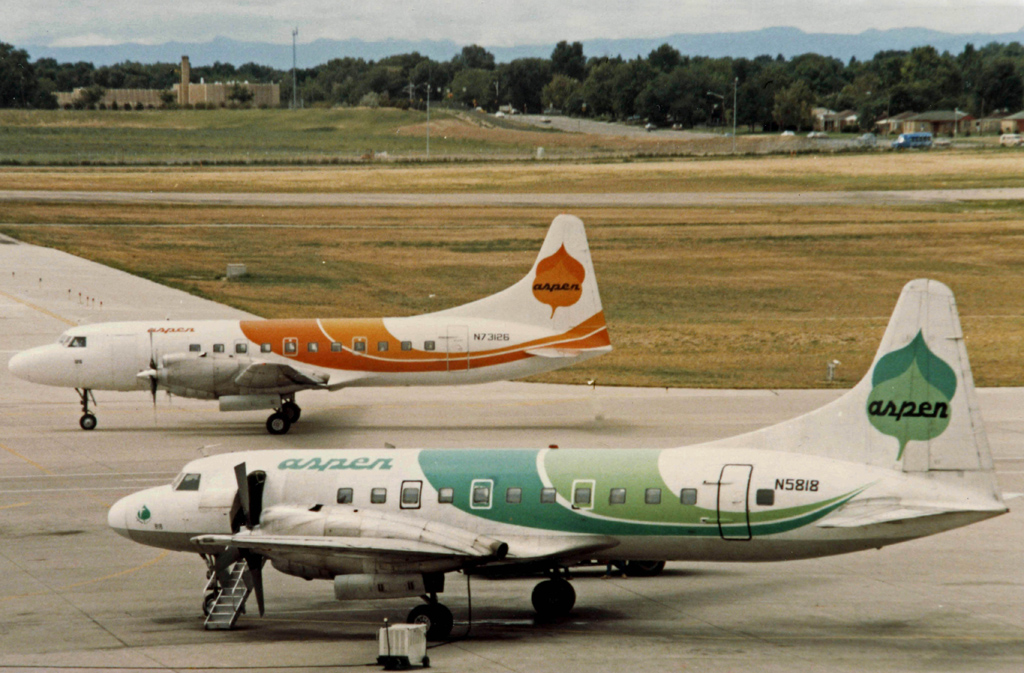
Two Convair 580s (here belonging to Aspen Airways) at Stapleton Airport in 1986. This is one of the models of aircraft Emily Howell Warner began flying at Clinton Aviation.

She took a job as a receptionist for Clinton Aviation Company in Denver, Colorado to pay for her instruction. She worked there as a flight instructor after obtaining additional certificates as a commercial pilot and flight instructor, and instrument and multiengine ratings. She worked extra maintenance flights, such as delivering airplane parts or planes, in order to build her hours. She also flew with a reporter to provide traffic reports.

From 1945 to 1968, Clinton Aviation Company operated at Stapleton Airport and was the first company in the US to sell Cessna airplanes. It was founded by Lou Clinton and Grant Robertson. Warner initially flew for Clinton Aviation as a first officer on Convair 580s and de Havilland Twin Otters. In 1966, United Air Lines contracted a test pilot program with Clinton Aviation, and Emily served as one of three flight instructors for the program. She was later promoted to flight school manager and chief pilot. She became the first woman to be appointed a designated FAA Pilot Examiner.

In 1968, she began applying for a position at Frontier Airlines as well as Continental Airlines and United Airlines. Lou Clinton wrote letters recommending her. She would renew her applications multiple times over a five-year period. In late 1972, a fellow flight instructor said he was hired by Frontier Airlines, strengthening Warner's resolve. At this point, Warner had been active in the aviation industry for more than twelve years. She had accrued more than 3,500 flight hours as a pilot and 7,000 hours as a flight instructor. Students she had trained were being hired with 1,500 to 2,000 hours of flying time. A friend who worked with Frontier introduced her to the vice president of flight operations there and Warner persisted in canvassing Frontier for a position.

== Frontier Airlines and aviation firsts ==
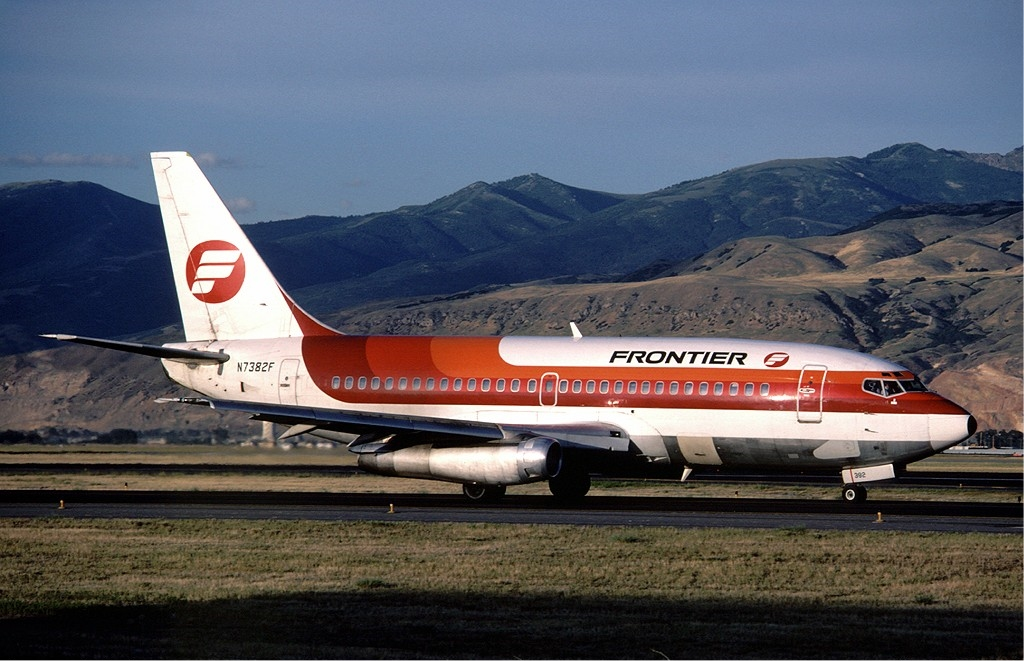
Warner flew Boeing 737-200s for Frontier Airlines such as the one pictured here

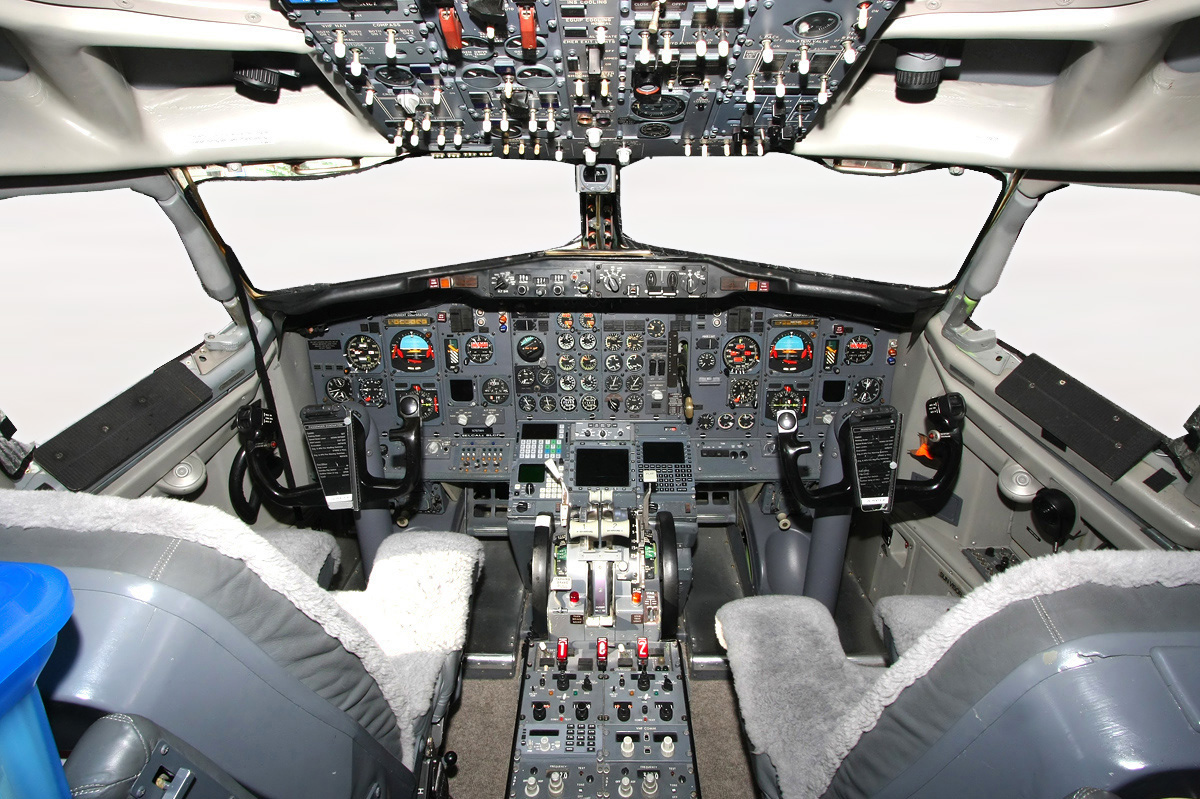
The flight deck of a Boeing 737-200.

On January 29, 1973, Frontier Airlines hired her. It was fifteen years after her first plane flight. This marked an opening for American women in one of the last sex-segregated occupations in the civilian aviation industry. When Warner was hired there were no other women working as pilots for the major commercial airlines. By 1978, there were about 300 female commercial pilots in the United States.

On February 6, 1973, Howell Warner served for the first time as second officer on a Frontier Airlines Boeing 737. The flight departed from Denver's Stapleton Airport for Las Vegas. Within six months, she was promoted to first officer. In 1974, she became the first woman member of the Air Line Pilots Association (ALPA).

Three years later she became the first woman to earn her captain's wings. In 1976, she became the first woman US airline captain, flying a Twin Otter.

Howell Warner continued to fly with Frontier until 1986. Warner stayed on when People Express purchased Frontier and then itself was purchased by Continental Airlines. After a short time flying for Continental Airlines, she left to become captain of a Boeing 727 for UPS Airlines. She also flew a DC-8 for United Parcel Service. In 1986, she commanded an all-female flight crew.

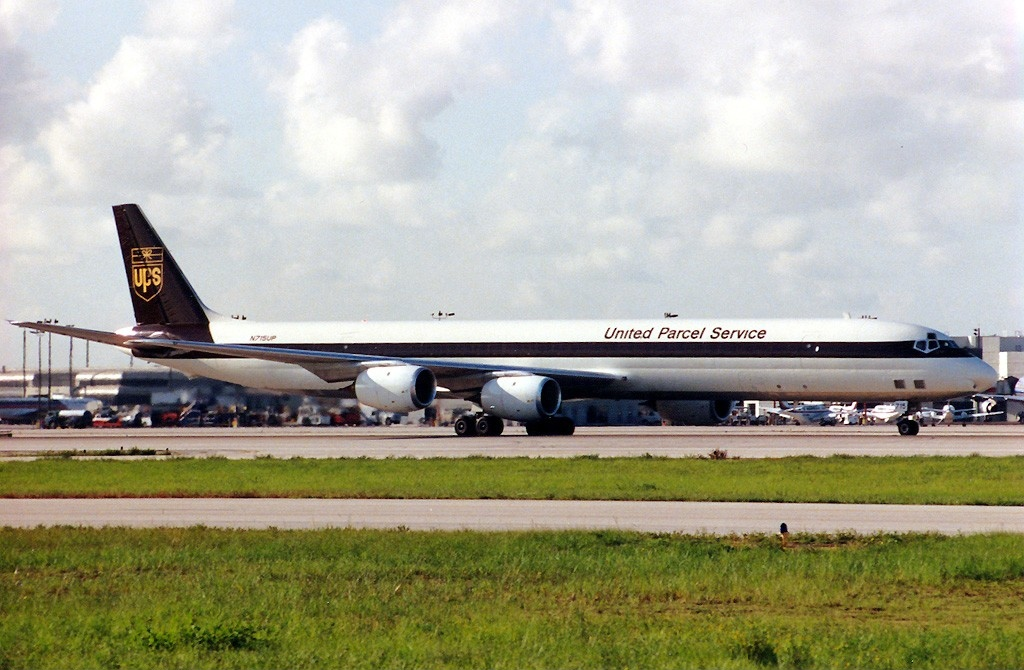
Warner flew DC-8s for UPS Airlines

In 1990, she left UPS Airlines to become a Federal Aviation Administration examiner. She was the FAA Aircrew Program Manager, assigned to United Airlines' Boeing 737 Fleet.

== Awards and honors ==
- She earned the Amelia Earhart Award in 1973 as outstanding woman in US aviation.
- She was a featured speaker for the United Nations' International Women's Year.
- Her pilot's uniform hangs in the Smithsonian Institution's Air and Space Museum in Washington, D.C.
- In 1974 she was the first woman given membership in the Air Line Pilots Association.
- In 1983 she was inducted into the Colorado Aviation Hall of Fame.
- In 1992, Warner was inducted into the Women in Aviation International Pioneer Hall of Fame.
- Her name was installed in the International Forest of Friendship in 1993.
- The Emily Howell Warner Aviation Education Resource Center was established in the Granby Public Library in 1994.
- Colorado Senate Resolution 94-29: Honoring Capt. Emily Warner for her achievements in aviation history in 1994.
- She was inducted into the Colorado Wings over the Rockies Museum in 2000.
- She was a 2001 inductee into the National Women's Hall of Fame.
- She was inducted into the Colorado Women's Hall of Fame in 2002.
- Warner was inducted into the National Aviation Hall of Fame in 2014.

== Works ==
- McGuire, Jerry; Warner, Emily Howell (1979), Learning how to fly an airplane, TAB Books, ISBN 978-0-8306-9827-1
