= Lina Bertling Tjernberg =

Swedish electrical engineer

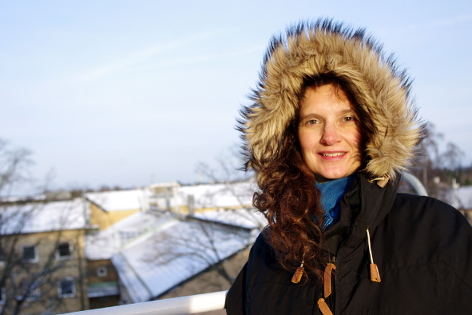
Tjernberg in 2016

Lina Bertling Tjernberg (formerly Lina Margarita Bertling; born 1973) is a Swedish electrical engineer, a professor in the Division of Electric Power and Energy Systems of the KTH Royal Institute of Technology in Stockholm, and deputy head of the institute's School of Electrical Engineering and Computer Science. Her research concerns the reliability, maintenance, and asset management of power infrastructure over its lifetime.

== Education and career ==
Tjernberg was born in 1973 in Huddinge Municipality, part of the Stockholm urban area. After studying vehicle engineering at KTH and earning a master's degree in 1997, she switched to electrical power engineering, still at KTH. She received a licenciate in 1999 and completed her Ph.D. in 2002. In 2008 she received a docent degree, the Swedish equivalent of a habilitation.

Beginning in 2002 she was an associate professor at KTH, on leave for 2002–2003 to be a postdoctoral researcher at the University of Toronto. In 2007 she also became director of research for the Swedish national grid. In 2009 she moved from KTH to Chalmers University to become Professor of Sustainable Electric Power Systems, and in 2013 she returned to KTH as Professor of Power Grid Technology. She became deputy head of the school in 2024.

== Book ==
Tjernberg is the author of Infrastructure Asset Management with Power System Applications (CRC Press, 2018).

== Recognition ==
Tjernberg was a distinguished lecturer of the IEEE Power Engineering Society in 2016, and of the IEEE Reliability Society in 2024. She was named as a Fellow of the Royal Swedish Academy of Engineering Sciences in 2022. She was named to the 2026 class of IEEE Fellows, "for contributions to predictive maintenance models for power system reliability".
