= Thomas Noel (historian) =

American historian (born 1945)

Thomas Jacob Noel (born 6 May 1945 in Boston, Massachusetts), often introduced in media interviews as Dr. Colorado, is an American historian specializing in the history of the Rocky Mountain West, and especially of the state of Colorado. He is a professor of history at the University of Colorado at Denver, where he teaches classes in the history of the American West, Colorado, Denver, historic preservation, mining and railroads, national parks, and Western art and architecture. He is the co-author or author of more than fifty books, numerous articles, and newspaper columns. He is the director of the Center for Colorado Studies at the Denver Public Library. The center provides many resources for students including Colorado books, book reviews, short-documentaries, as well as Native American, Hispanic, and other resource guides.

Noel won a Colorado Book Award in 1997 among numerous other awards. Noel leads walking, railroading, and motor-coach tours for various groups including The Colorado Historical Society and The Smithsonian. He chaired the Denver Landmark Preservation Commission and served as a National Register reviewer for Colorado.

== Biography ==
Born in Boston on May 6, 1945, Noel is a graduate of the University of Denver (B.A. history and M.A. library science). He received an M.A. and Ph.D. in history from the University of Colorado Boulder. His mother (a psychiatrist) and grandmother (a teacher) also received their graduate degree from the University of Colorado Boulder. His early work experience included part-time jobs such as a Christmas card salesman, gardener, paperboy, bus boy, soda jerk, pool hall attendant, life guard, swim instructor, library page, writer, dude ranch roustabout, Colorado Historical Society tour guide, and photo librarian.

Noel wrote long-running newspaper columns on western history for the Sunday Rocky Mountain News and The Sunday Denver Post. He television work includes roles as a historical consultant, "talking head", and narrator for The Discovery Channel, The History Channel, The Travel Channel, and local Denver stations. He regularly appears as "Dr. Colorado" on Colorado & Company on Channel 9 (NBC television) in Denver.

His many awards and prizes have come from, among others: The American Institute of Architects, The American Association of State and Local History, the City of Denver, The Old House Society, The Colorado Center for the Book, The Frank Waters Prize, The Angie DeBow Prize and The National Science Foundation.

== Books ==
- Leonard, Stephen J. & Thomas J. Noel. A Short History of Denver. Carson City: Univ. of Nevada Press, 2016. xvii+211 p. index. selected bibliography. photos. timeline. paperback $21.95.
- Noel, Thomas J. & Nicholas J. Wharton. Denver Landmarks & Historic Districts. Boulder: University Press of Colorado, 2016. xvi + 197 p. index. bibliography. appendices. Photos. drawings. maps. paperback. $29.95.
- Noel, Thomas J. The University Club of Denver. Denver: University Club of Denver, 2016. 151 p. index, sources, photos, drawings. $49.00.
- Noel, Thomas J. & Craig Leavitt. Herndon Davis: Painting Colorado History, 1901 – 1962. Boulder: University Press of Colorado, 2016. 296 pages, 173 color images. Index, bibliography. 9 x 12 paperback $34.95
- Noel, Thomas J. Colorado: A Historical Atlas. Norman: University of Oklahoma Press, 2015. xii + ,368 p. index, 112 color maps, 109 color illustrations, 7 charts, bibliography. $39.95 hardback.
- Thomas J. Noel with Jane C. Harper & Craig W. Leavitt. Colorado Newspapers: A History & Inventory, 1859-2000. Denver: Colorado Press Association Founder & Center for Colorado & The West at the Auraria Library, 2014. xv + 432 p. bibliography, appendices, photos, drawings. paperback $49.95. 1,000 copies printed
- Anschutz, Philip F., William J. Convery & Thomas J. Noel. Out Where The West Begins: Profiles, Visions & Strategies of Early Western Business Leaders. Denver: Cloud Camp Press, Inc., 2015. 392 p., index, chapter sources, color paintings, B & w photos. hardback. (Distributed by U. Of Oklahoma Press)
- Noel, Thomas J., Craig W. Leavitt with Diane B. Wunnicke. A History of the Hilltop Heritage Conservation Overlay District in Denver Colorado. Denver: Center for Colorado & The West at the Auraria Library, 2013. 92 p. index. endnotes. color & b & w photos. maps. paperback. $5.00.
- Abbott, Carl, Stephen J. Leonard & Thomas J. Noel. Colorado: A History of the Centennial State. Niwot: University Press of Colorado, 2013. fifth, heavily revised edition. xvi + 553p. index. bibliography. endnotes. 125 photos, maps, drawings. biographies. Officials. Statistics and symbols. 6" x 9 1/4" hardback & paperback. $29.95This thorough survey emphasizes the state's 20th century urbanization, environmental issues, multi-culturalism and boosterism.
- Noel, Thomas J. University of Colorado Hospital: A History. Denver: University of Colorado Hospital Foundation, 2013. 155 p. index. Sources. color & b & w images. 9 ½ x 12 ½’ hardback. $50.
- Gallagher, Dennis, Thomas Jacob Noel & James Patrick Walsh. Irish Denver. Charleston, SC: Arcadia Publishing, 2012. (Images of America Series) 128 p., index, bibliography, b + w photos and drawings, 6 ½” x 9 ¼”Paperback. $21.99.
- Noel, Thomas J. & Debra B. Faulkner. The Colorado Story. Layton, Utah: Gibbs Smith Education, 2011. xvii + 238 p. Index. Glossary. Maps. color and black and white images. 10” x 11” hardback. $44.95
- Mile High Tourism: Denver's Convention & Visitor History (2010), with Debra Faulkner.
- Showtime: Denver's Performing Arts & Convention Centers (2008), with Amy Zimmer.
- A Guide to Colorado Historic Places (2007) Boulder, Colo.: Westcliffe Publishers.
- Colorado: A History of the Centennial State (2005) with Carl Abbot and Stephen J. Leonard, Boulder, Colo.: Univ. Press of Colorado, ISBN 978-0-87081-800-4.
- Riding High: Colorado Ranchers & 100 years of the National Western Stockshow (2005) Golden, Colo.: Fulcrum Publishing, ISBN 978-1-55591-562-9.
- Sacred Stones: Colorado's Red Rock Park & Amphitheatre (City & County of Denver, 2004)
- Buildings of Colorado (1997) New York: Oxford Univ. Press.
- Colorado: A Liquid History & Tavern Guide to the Highest State (1999) Golden, Colo.: Fulcrum Publishing, ISBN 978-1-55591-260-4.
- Historical Atlas of Colorado (1993) Norman, Okla.: Oklahoma Univ. Press, ISBN 978-0-8061-2591-6.
- Denver: Mining Camp to Metropolis (1990) Boulder, Colo.: Univ. Press of Colorado, with Stephen J. Leonard, ISBN 978-0-87081-240-8.
- Colorado 1870-2000 Revisited (2001), with John Fielder, Boulder, Colo.: Big Earth Publishing, ISBN 1-56579-389-7, ISBN 978-1-56579-389-7.
- The City and the Saloon (1996) Boulder, Colo.: Univ. Press of Colorado, ISBN 978-0-87081-426-6.
- Honest John Shafroth (2003) Boulder, Colo.: Univ. Press of Colorado, ISBN 978-0-942576-43-6.
- Lowry: Military Base to New Urban Community (2002) with Chuck Woodward, Denver, Colo.: Historic Denver, Inc., ISBN 0-914248-31-6.
- The Park Hill Neighborhood (2002) with William J. Hansen, Denver, Colo.: Historic Denver, Inc., ISBN 0-914248-33-2.
- The Colorado Almanac: Facts about Colorado with Nuggets of Knowledge from Dr. Colorado (2001) Portland, Ore.: West Winds Press/Graphic Arts Center Publishing, ISBN 978-1-55868-598-7.
- Fort Collins & Larimer County: An Illustrated History (2001) with Ron Sladek, Carlsbad, Calif.: Heritage Mediae Corp. & Historic Fort Collins.
- A Pikes Peak Partnership: The Penroses and the Tutts (2000) with Cathleen M. Norman, Boulder: University Press of Colorado.
- The Montclair Neighborhood (1999) with William J. Hanson, Denver, Colo.: Historic Denver, Inc.
- Boulder County: An Illustrated History (1999) with Dan W. Corson, Boulder: Historic Boulder, Inc.
