= Clan Stirling =

Lowland Scottish clan

- Crest: Issuing out of an antique coronet Or a hart's head couped Azure
- Motto: Gang Forward

Profile
- Region: Lowlands
- District: East Dunbartonshire Stirlingshire Perthshire

Chief
- Francis Stirling of Cadder
- Chief of the Name and Arms of Stirling
- Seat: Oakley Street, London SW3
- Historic seat: Cadder House
Clan branches
Stirling of Cadder (chiefs)
Stirling of Glorat
Stirling of Keir
Stirling of Garden
Stirling of Faskine
Rival clans
Clan Kincaid

Clan Stirling is a Scottish clan of the Scottish Lowlands.

== History ==
=== Origins of the clan ===
The Scottish town of Stirling and Stirling Castle lie at the crossroads of Scotland and this could account for the derivation of the name which means place of strife.

Appearing in a charter of David I of Scotland in around 1147 is Thoraldus who held the lands of Cadder. His descendant was Alexander de Strivelyn, fifth Laird of Cadder who died in 1304.

=== Wars of Scottish Independence ===
During the Wars of Scottish Independence Alexander's heir, Sir John de Strivelyn, was killed at the Battle of Halidon Hill in 1333.

=== 15th and 16th centuries ===
The grandson of Sir John de Strivelyn was Sir William who had two sons. The succession passed through his eldest son, also called William, for four generations. After this it passed to a grandson of the second son, Sir John de Strivelyn, third Laird of Cragernard. Sir John was the governor of the royal Dumbarton Castle and sheriff of Dunbartonshire. James I of Scotland appointed him as Comptroller of the Royal Household and armour bearer. He was knighted in 1430. His son, William, acquired from the Earl of Lennox the lands of Glorat. William also held Dumbarton Castle and this appointment passed to his son, George, who defended it for the Crown between 1534 and 1547. George fought at the Battle of Pinkie Cleugh and died of wounds received there.

In 1581 Malcom Kincaid of Clan Kincaid was killed by a Stirling of Glovat (Glorat).

=== 17th century and civil war ===
George's great grandson was Sir Mungo Stirling of Glorat who was a staunch supporter of Charles I. In recognition of his bravery Charles knighted Sir Mungo. Sir Mungo's son was George Stirling who was created a Baronet of Nova Scotia in 1666.

The Stirlings of Keir had acquired the lands of Keir in Perthshire in the mid 15th century when Prince James, son of James II of Scotland rebelled against his father and Sir William Stirling of Keir was one of his supporters. Sir William Stirling's descendant, Sir Archibald Stirling of Keir was a prominent lawyer who supported the king during the Scottish Civil War and on the Restoration of the monarchy in 1660. The Stirling of Garden branch of the clan descend from this Sir Archibald Stirling. He was also appointed to the Supreme Court with the title Lord Garden. His third son, James Stirling (1692 – 1770), was a prominent mathematician.

=== 18th century and Jacobite risings ===
During both the Jacobite rising of 1715 and the Jacobite rising of 1745 the Stirling Lairds of Keir fought for the Stuarts. James Stirling of Keir was tried for high treason after the "Gathering of Brig o' Turk" in support of James Stuart's abortive invasion of 1708, but acquitted. His estates were forfeited for his part in the rising of 1715 but they were later restored.

Walter Stirling of Faskine served in the Royal Navy and was appointed commander-in-chief of the fleet by George III of Great Britain. The Stirling of Faksine branch of the clan claimed descent from a nephew of William the Lion but they were in fact a collateral branch of the Stirlings of Cadder.

James Stirling of Drumpellier fought in the war against America in 1812 and was later made Governor of Western Australia.

=== Modern history ===
The Stirling family's historic connection with Dumbarton Castle continued into the twentieth century when in 1927 Sir George Stirling of Glorat was appointed keeper of the castle. Stirling of Garden was Lord Lieutenant of Stirling and Falkirk (until 2005).

Sir David Stirling of the Stirling of Keir branch of the clan was the founder of the British special forces regiment, the Special Air Service during World War II, alongside his brother Bill Stirling of Keir.

== Clan chief ==
The current chief of Clan Stirling is Francis Stirling of Cadder, Chief of the Name and Arms of Stirling.

== Clan castles ==
- Cadder Estate was the ancient seat of the chiefs of Clan Stirling.
- Drumpellier House
- Keir House
- Dumbarton Castle, several chiefs of Clan Stirling from the 15th century onwards have been sheriffs of Dunbarton.
- Glorat House, Home to the Stirlings of Glorat

== Spelling variations ==
Note: Clan Stirling has no recognized septs.

Spelling variations of the name Stirling include (among others):

Staereling, Stairline, Stairling, Starlin, Starling, Stairlink, Sterline, Sterling, Sterlink, Sterlline, Sterlling, Sterllink, Steuline, Steuling, Steulink, Stewline, Stewling, Stewlink, Stirine, Stiring, Stirink, Stirline, Stirling, Stirlink, Strifelan, Strifeland, Strifelane, Strifelant, Strifelen, Strifelend, Strifelent, Strifelind, Strifelint, Strifelyn, Strifelynd, Striffelan, Striffeland, Striffelane, Striffelant, Striffelen, Striffelend, Striffelent, Striffelind, Striffelint, Striffelyn, Striffelynd, Strivelan, Striveland, Strivelane, Strivelant, Strivelen, Strivelend, Strivelent, Strivelind, Strivelint, Strivelyn, Strivelynd, Sturline, Sturling, Sturlink, Styrline, Styrling, Styrlink.

== See also ==
- Scottish clan
- Stirling baronets
