= William Stirling-Hamilton =

William Stirling-Hamilton may refer to:

- Sir William Hamilton, 9th Baronet (1788–1856)
- Sir William Stirling-Hamilton, 10th Baronet (1830–1913) of the Stirling-Hamilton Baronets
- Sir William Stirling-Hamilton, 11th Baronet (1868–1946) of the Stirling-Hamilton Baronets

== See also ==
- Stirling-Hamilton Baronets
- William Stirling (disambiguation)
- William Hamilton (disambiguation)
