= General Stirling =

General Stirling may refer to:

- Archibald Stirling (British Army officer) (1867–1931), British Army brigadier general
- Sir Thomas Stirling, 5th Baronet (1733–1808), British Army general
- William Stirling (British Army officer, born 1835) (1835–1906), British Army general
- William Stirling (British Army officer, born 1907) (1907–1973), British Army general

== See also ==
- William Alexander, Lord Stirling (1726−1783), Continental Army major general
