= Slogan (heraldry) =

Heraldic motto in Scottish heraldry

The slogan CREAG AN TUIRC appears on the crest badge of a member of Clan MacLaren.

Arms of Brady Brim-DeForest, Baron of Balvaird with the motto above the crest and war cry or slogan below.

A slogan is used in Scottish heraldry as a heraldic motto or a secondary motto. It usually appears above the crest on a coat of arms, though sometimes it appears as a secondary motto beneath the shield. The word slogan dates from 1513. It is a variant of the earlier slogorn, which was an Anglicisation of the Scottish Gaelic sluagh-ghairm (sluagh "army", "host" + gairm "cry"). In other regions it is called a war-cry.

== Mottoes and heraldry ==
There are several possible origins for mottoes used in heraldry, and slogans may have originated from battle cries or war cries. There are several notable heraldic mottoes which are thought to originate from a war cries. For example, the Royal coat of arms of the United Kingdom contains the motto DIEU ET MON DROIT ("God and my right") which has been thought to originated as a war cry, as has the motto MONTJOYE SAINT-DENIS which appeared on the former French coat of arms. (Note: This motto is a reference to the oriflamme, the royal standard banner of the kings of France, which was kept in the Basilique Saint-Denis.) Several mottoes found in Irish heraldry, which end in a boo, are also thought to have originated as war cries. Examples of such Irish mottoes are CROM A BOO of the Fitzgerald earls of Leinster; and SHANET A BOO of the Fitzgerald earls of Desmond.

Not all slogans are based on war cries. Many slogans pertaining to Scottish clan chiefs have been registered relatively recently at the Court of the Lord Lyon. Sometimes slogans are merely a name, such as A HOME A HOME A HOME of the Homes, others refer to a rallying point for the clan, like CRUACHAN of the Campbells, some slogans refer to a prominent clansman like the Maclean Fear eile airson Eachuinn ("Another for Hector"). In at least one case, a patron saint is used as a slogan, as in St Bennet and Set On of the Setons. The arms of Grant use two slogans (or mottoes): CRAIG ELACHAIDH, which appears above the crest; and STANDFAST, which appears beneath on a scroll beneath the shield. Sometimes a clan chief's slogan appears on his crest badge and in consequence on the crest badges worn by his clan members. In some cases the chief's slogan also appears on his standard, guidon and pinsel.

== Slogans ==
Slogans officially recorded at the Court of the Lord Lyon as incident to the chief's Arms. Also rendered in all-caps.

| Clan or title | Slogan | Notes |
|---|---|---|
| Anstruther | CASTLE DREEL | |
| Arthur | EISD O EISD | (from Scottish Gaelic: "Listen o listen") Appears in the second compartment of the current chief's Arms. |
| Barclay | TOWIE BARCLAY | |
| Borthwick | A BORTHWICK | |
| Bruce | FUIMUS | Latin: "We have been". |
| Buchanan | Clar Innis | An island in Loch Lomond. |
| Buchan | AUCHMACOY | Refers to the clan seat in Auchmacoy. |
| Cameron | Chlanna nan con thigibh a' so 's gheibh sibh feòil | (from Scottish Gaelic: "Sons of the hounds come here and get flesh") |
| Campbell | CRUACHAN | Previously thought to refer to Ben Cruachan near Loch Awe. The slogan actually refers to a farm on the west coast of Loch Awe, opposite Innischonnell Castle. |
| Colquhoun | CNOC EALACHAIN | Refers to a mountain near Rossdhu, former seat of the chiefs of the clan. |
| Cranstoun | COREHOUSE | Refers to the clan seat in Corehouse. |
| Donnachaidh | GARG 'N UAIR DHUISGEAR | (from Scottish Gaelic: "Fierce when roused") |
| Drummond | GANG WARILY | |
| Farquharson | CÀRN NA CUIMHNE | (from Scottish Gaelic: "Cairn of remembrance") |
| Forbes | Lònach | A mountain in Strathdon. |
| Forsyth | INSTAURATOR RUINAE | Latin: "A repairer of ruin" |
| Fraser | A' Mhor-fhaiche | (from Scottish Gaelic: "Restorer of Ruins") |
| Fraser | Caistel Dhùm | Castle Downie. |
| Gordon | AN GORDONACH | (from Scottish Gaelic: "A Gordon") |
| Grant | CRAIG ELACHAIDH | (from Scottish Gaelic: "The rock of alarm") |
| Gregor | ARD-COILLE | (from Scottish Gaelic: "Height of the wood", or "High wood") |
| Grierson | LAG | |
| Hannay | SORBIE | |
| Hay | THE HAY | |
| Henderson | FORDELL | |
| Highlanders in general | Albanich! | |
| Johnstone | LOCHWOOD | |
| Keith | A KEITH | |
| Kerr | Sero Sed Serio | Latin: Late but in earnest |
| Kincaid | A KINCAID | |
| King of Scotland | St. Andrew! | |
| Lamont | ARDLAMONT | |
| Lennox | THE LENNOX | |
| Leslie | BALLINBREICH | |
| Lumsden | A LUMSDEN | |
| Macdonald | FRAOCH EILEAN | (from Scottish Gaelic: "The Heathery Isle") The slogan appears on a compartment in the current chief's Arms. The slogan refers to an island in the Sound of Islay. |
| Macdonald of Clanranald | DH' AINDEOIN CO THEIREADH E | (from Scottish Gaelic: "Gainsay who dare") The slogan appears on a compartment in the current chief's Arms. |
| Macdonell of Glengarry | CRAGAN AN FHITHICH | (from Scottish Gaelic: "The raven's rock") The slogan appears in an Escroll over the Arms of the current chief. |
| MacDonald of Keppoch | DIA 'S NAOMH AINDREA | (from Scottish Gaelic: "God and St. Andrew") The slogan appears as a second motto in a lower Escroll on the current chief's Arms. |
| MacDougall | Buaidh no Bàs | (from Scottish Gaelic: "Victory or Death") |
| Macfarlane | Loch Slòigh | (from Scottish Gaelic: "The loch of the host") |
| Macgillivray | Dunmaghlas | The name of the chief's castle. |
| Mackay | BRATACH BAN MHIC AOIDH | (from Scottish Gaelic: "The white banner of The Mackay") |
| Mackenzie | Tulach Ard | (from Scottish Gaelic: "The High Hillock") |
| Mackinnon | Cuimhnich bàs Ailpein | (from Scottish Gaelic: "Remember the death of Alpin") |
| Mackintosh | LOCH MÒIGH | Loch Moy, a loch near the seat of the clan chiefs. |
| MacLaren | Creag an Tuirc | (from Scottish Gaelic: "The boar's rock") |
| Maclean | Bàs no Beatha | (from Scottish Gaelic: "Death or life") |
| Maclean | Fear eile airson Eachuinn | (from Scottish Gaelic: "Another for Hector") |
| MacLennan | Druim nan deur | (from Scottish Gaelic: "The ridge of tears") |
| MacMillan | CHNAP | (from Scottish Gaelic: "Knap") |
| Macnab | BOVAIN | The old Macnab duthus. |
| Macnaghten | Frechelan | A castle on Loch Awe. |
| MacNeil | Buaidh no Bàs | (from Scottish Gaelic: "Victory or Death") |
| Macpherson | CREAG AN DHUIBH | (from Scottish Gaelic: "The black rock") Located near Cluny. |
| Macquarrie | An t-Arm breac dearg | (from Scottish Gaelic: "The Red Speckled (or spotted) Army") |
| Macrae | Sgurr Uaran | A mountain in Kintail near Loch Duich. It is one of the "Five Sisters of Kintail". |
| Matheson | Acha 'n dà thernaidh | (from Scottish Gaelic: "The Field of the Two Declivities") |
| Menzies | Geal is Dearg a suas | (from Scottish Gaelic: "Up with the Red and White") |
| Morrison | DUN EISTEIN | Dùn Èistean, sometimes Anglicised as "Hugh's Castle". The slogan appears on the chief's Arms (on a compartment below the shield). |
| Munro | CASTEAL FÓLAIS NA THEINE | (from Scottish Gaelic: "Foulis Castle on fire") |
| Murray | Furth fortune and fill the fetters | (from Scots: "go forth against your enemies, have good fortune, and return with captives") |
| Stewart of Appin | Creag-an-Sgairbh | (from Scottish Gaelic: "The Cormorant's Rock") A rock in Appin. |
| Sutherland | Ceann na Drochaide Bige | A bridge at Dunrobin. |
