= William Stirling =

William Stirling may refer to:

- Sir William Stirling-Maxwell, 9th Baronet (1818–1878), Scottish historical writer
- William Stirling (footballer) (died 1914), Scottish footballer of the late 19th-century
- William Stirling (physiologist) (1851–1932), Scottish professor of physiology
- William Stirling (British Army officer, born 1835) (1835–1906), British general
- William Stirling (British Army officer, born 1907) (1907–1973), British general
- Bill Stirling (British Army officer), SAS officer and brother of David Stirling
- William George Stirling, colonial administrator, artist, sculptor, and criminologist
- William George Stirling (physicist), 2018 winner of President's Medal of the IOP

== See also ==
- Bill Stirling (disambiguation)
- William Sterling (disambiguation)
- William Stirling-Hamilton (disambiguation)
