= Charles Lever =

Irish novelist and raconteur (1806–1872)

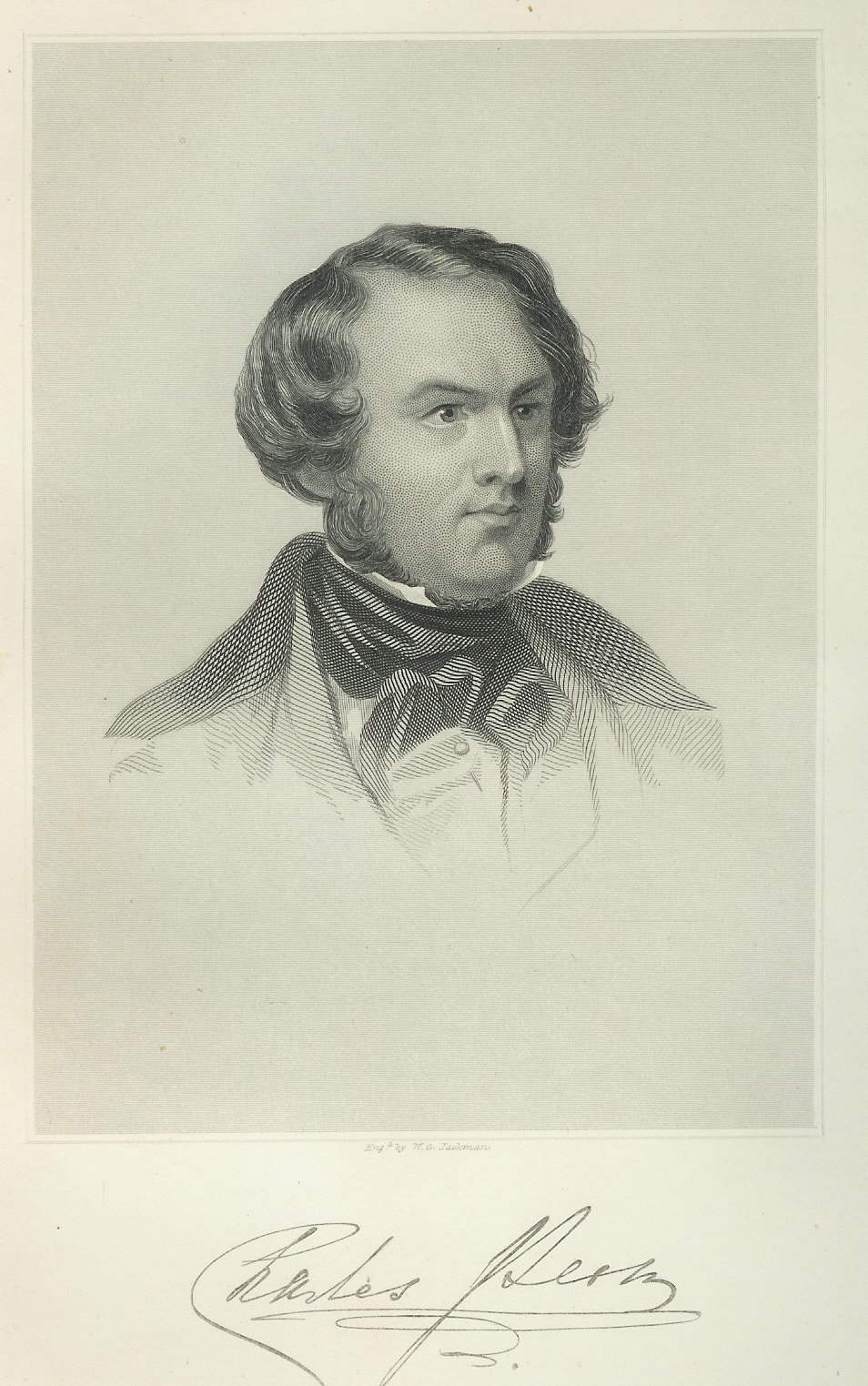
- Lever in 1858
- Born: Charles James Lever; 31 August 1806; Dublin, Ireland
- Died: 1 June 1872 (aged 65); Trieste, Austria-Hungary (now in Italy)
- Education: Trinity College, Dublin
- Occupations: Novelist, raconteur
- Spouse: Catherine Baker (m. 1833–1870)

Charles James Lever (31 August 1806 – 1 June 1872) was an Irish novelist and raconteur, whose novels, according to Anthony Trollope, were just like his conversation.

== Biography ==
=== Early life ===
Lever was born in Amiens Street, Dublin, the second son of James Lever, an architect and builder, and was educated in private schools. His escapades at Trinity College, Dublin (1823–1828), where he took the degree in medicine in 1831, are drawn on for the plots of some of his novels. The character Frank Webber in the novel Charles O'Malley was based on a college friend, Robert Boyle, who later became a clergyman. Lever and Boyle earned pocket-money singing ballads of their own composing in the streets of Dublin and played many other pranks which Lever embellished in the novels O'Malley, Con Cregan and Lord Kilgobbin. Before seriously embarking upon his medical studies, Lever visited Canada as an unqualified surgeon on an emigrant ship, and has drawn upon some of his experiences in Con Cregan, Arthur O'Leary and Roland Cashel. Arriving in Canada, he journeyed into the backwoods, where he was affiliated to a tribe of Native Americans but had to flee because his life was in danger, as later his character Bagenal Daly did in his novel The Knight of Gwynne.

Back in Europe, he pretended he was a student from the University of Göttingen and travelled to the University of Jena (where he saw Goethe), and then to Vienna. He loved German student life, and several of his songs, such as "The Pope He Loved a Merry Life", are based on student-song models. His medical degree earned him an appointment to the Board of Health in County Clare and then as a dispensary doctor in Portstewart, County Londonderry, but his conduct as a country doctor earned him the censure of the authorities.

=== Career ===
In 1833 he married his first love, Catherine Baker, and in February 1837, after varied experiences, he began publishing The Confessions of Harry Lorrequer in the recently established Dublin University Magazine. During the previous seven years, the popular taste had turned toward the "service novel", examples of which include Frank Mildmay (1829) by Frederick Marryat, Tom Cringle's Log (1829) by Michael Scott, The Subaltern (1825) by George Robert Gleig, Cyril Thornton (1827) by Thomas Hamilton, Stories of Waterloo (1833) by William Hamilton Maxwell, Ben Brace (1840) by Frederick Chamier and The Bivouac (1837), also by Maxwell. Lever had met William Hamilton Maxwell, the titular founder of the genre. Before Harry Lorrequer appeared in volume form (1839), Lever had settled - on the strength of a slight diplomatic connection - as a fashionable physician in Brussels (Hertogstraat 16).

Lorrequer was merely a string of Irish and other stories - good, bad and indifferent, but mostly rollicking. Lever, who strung together his anecdotes late at night after the serious business of his day, was astonished at its success. "If this sort of thing amuses them, I can go on forever." Brussels was indeed a superb place for the observation of half-pay officers, such as Major Monsoon (Commissioner Meade), Captain Bubbleton and the like, who terrorised the taverns of the place with their endless Peninsular stories, and of English society a little damaged, which it became the speciality of Lever to depict. He sketched with a free hand, wrote, as he lived, from hand to mouth, and the chief difficulty he experienced was that of getting rid of his characters who "hung about him like those tiresome people who never can make up their minds to bid you good night". Lever had never taken part in a battle himself, but his next three books, Charles O'Malley (1841), Jack Hinton (1843), and Tom Burke of Ours (1844), written under the spur of the writer's chronic extravagance, contain some splendid military writing and some of the most animated battle-pieces on record. In pages of O'Malley and Tom Burke Lever anticipates not a few of the best effects of Marbot, Thibaut, Lejeune, Griois, Seruzier, Burgoyne and the like. His account of the Douro need hardly fear comparison, it has been said, with Napier's. Condemned by the critics, Lever had completely won the general reader - from the Iron Duke himself downwards.

In 1842 he returned to Dublin to edit the Dublin University Magazine, and gathered round him a typical coterie of Irish wits (including one or two hornets) such as the O'Suilivans, Archer Butler, William Carleton, Sir William Wilde, Canon Hayman, DF McCarthy, McGlashan, Dr Kencaly and many others. In June 1842 he welcomed at Templeogue, four miles southwest of Dublin, the author of the Snob Papers on his Irish tour (the Sketch Book was, later, dedicated to Lever). Thackeray recognised the fund of Irish sadness beneath the surface merriment. "The author's character is not humour but sentiment. The spirits are mostly artificial, the fond is sadness, as appears to me to be that of most Irish writing and people." The Waterloo episode in Thackeray's Vanity Fair (1847–1848) was in part an outcome of the talk between the two novelists. But the "Galway pace", the display he found it necessary to maintain at Templeogue, the stable full of horses, the cards, the friends to entertain, the quarrels to compose and the enormous rapidity with which he had to complete Tom Burke, The O'Donoghue and Arthur O'Leary (1845) made his native land an impossible place for Lever to continue in. Templeogue would soon have proved another Abbotsford.

Thackeray suggested London, but Lever required a new field of literary observation and anecdote. His creative inspiration exhausted, he decided to renew it on the continent. In 1845 he resigned his editorship and went back to Brussels, whence he started upon an unlimited tour of central Europe in a family coach. Now and again he halted for a few months, and entertained to the limit of his resources in some ducal castle or other which he hired for an off-season. Thus at Riedenburg, near Bregenz, in August 1846, he entertained Charles Dickens and his wife and other well-known people. Dickens would later publish Lever's novel A Day's Ride in serial in his weekly journal All the Year Round, running parallel to Great Expectations for part of its run from 1860 to 1861. Like his own Daltons or Dodd Family Abroad he travelled continentally, from Karlsruhe to Como, from Como to Florence, from Florence to the Baths of Lucca and so on, and his letters home are the litany of the literary remittance-man, his ambition now limited to driving a pair of novels abreast without a diminution of his standard price for serial work ("twenty pounds a sheet"). In the Knight of Gwynne, a story of the Union (1847), The Confessions of Con Cregan (1849), Roland Cashel (1850) and Maurice Tiernay (1852) we still have traces of his old manner; but he was beginning to lose his original joy in composition. His innate sadness began to cloud the animal joyousness of his temperament. Formerly he had written for the happy world which is young and curly and merry; now he grew fat and bald and grave. "After 38 or so what has life to offer but one universal declension. Let the crew pump as hard as they like, the leak gains every hour." His son, Charles Sidney Lever, died in 1863 and is buried in Florence's English Cemetery.

=== Later life ===
Depressed in spirit as Lever was, his wit was unextinguished; he was still the delight of the salons with his stories, and in 1867, after a few years' experience of a similar kind at Spezia, he was cheered by a letter from Lord Derby offering him the more lucrative consulship of Trieste. "Here is six hundred a year for doing nothing, and you are just the man to do it." The six hundred could not atone to Lever for the lassitude of prolonged exile. Trieste, at first "all that I could desire", became with characteristic abruptness "detestable and damnable". "Nothing to eat, nothing to drink, no one to speak to." "Of all the dreary places it has been my lot to sojourn in this is the worst" (some references to Trieste will be found in That Boy of Norcott's, 1869). He could never be alone and was almost morbidly dependent upon literary encouragement. Fortunately, like Scott, he had unscrupulous friends who assured him that his last efforts were his best. They include The Fortunes of Glencore (1857), Tony Butler (1865), Luttrell of Arran (1865), Sir Brooke Fosbrooke (1866), Lord Kilgobbin (1872) and the table-talk of Cornelius O'Dowd, originally contributed to Blackwood's.

His depression, partly due to incipient heart disease, partly to the growing conviction that he was the victim of literary and critical conspiracy, was confirmed by the death of his wife (23 April 1870), to whom he was tenderly attached. He visited Ireland in the following year and seemed alternately in high and low spirits. Death had already given him one or two runaway knocks, and, after his return to Trieste, he failed gradually, dying suddenly, however, and almost painlessly, from heart failure on 1 June 1872 at his home, Villa Gasteiger. His daughters, one of whom, Sydney, is believed to have been the real author of A Rent in a Cloud (1869), were well provided for.

== Assessments ==
Trollope praised Lever's novels highly when he said that they were just like his conversation. He was a born raconteur, and had in perfection that easy flow of light description which without tedium or hurry leads up to the point of the good stories of which in earlier days his supply seemed inexhaustible. With little respect for unity of action or conventional novel structure, his brightest books, such as Lorrequer, O'Malley and Tom Burke, are in fact little more than recitals of scenes in the life of a particular "hero", unconnected by any continuous intrigue. The type of character he depicted is for the most part elementary. His women are mostly roués, romps or Xanthippes; his heroes have too much of the Pickle temper about them and fall an easy prey to the serious attacks of Poe or to the more playful gibes of Thackeray in Phil Fogarty or Bret Harte in Terence Denville. This last is a perfect bit of burlesque. Terence exchanges nineteen shots with the Hon. Captain Henry Somerset in the glen. "At each fire I shot away a button from his uniform. As my last bullet shot off the last button from his sleeve, I remarked quietly, 'You seem now, my lord, to be almost as ragged as the gentry you sneered at,' and rode haughtily away." And yet these careless sketches contain such haunting creations as Frank Webber, Major Monsoon and Micky Free, "the Sam Weller of Ireland".

According to the Encyclopædia Britannica Eleventh Edition:

Superior, it is sometimes claimed, in construction and style, the later books lack the panache of Lever's untamed youth. Where else shall we find the equals of the military scenes in O'Malley and Tom Burke, or the military episodes in Jack Hinton, Arthur O'Leary (the story of Aubuisson) or Maurice Tiernay (nothing he ever did is finer than the chapter introducing "A remnant of Fontenoy")? It is here that his true genius lies, even more than in his talent for conviviality and fun, which makes an early copy of an early Lever (with Phiz's illustrations) seem literally to exhale an atmosphere of past and present entertainment. It is here that he is a true romancist, not for boys only, but also for men. Lever's lack of artistry and of sympathy with the deeper traits of the Irish character have been stumbling-blocks to his reputation among the critics. Except to some extent in The Martins of Cro' Martin (1856) it may be admitted that his portraits of Irish are drawn too exclusively from the type, depicted in Sir Jonah Barrington's Memoirs and already well known on the English stage. He certainly had no deliberate intention of "lowering the national character". Quite the reverse. Yet his posthumous reputation seems to have suffered in consequence, in spite of all his Gallic sympathies and not unsuccessful endeavours to apotheosize the "Irish Brigade".

A library edition of the novels in 37 volumes appeared from 1897 to 1899 under the superintendence of Lever's daughter, Julie Kate Neville. Henry Hawley Smart is said to have taken Lever's work as one of his models when he set out on his career as a sporting novelist. Eugene O'Neill lists Lever as one of the authors represented on the family bookshelf in Long Day's Journey into Night, along with Shakespeare, Nietzsche, Gibbon, et al.

== Select bibliography ==
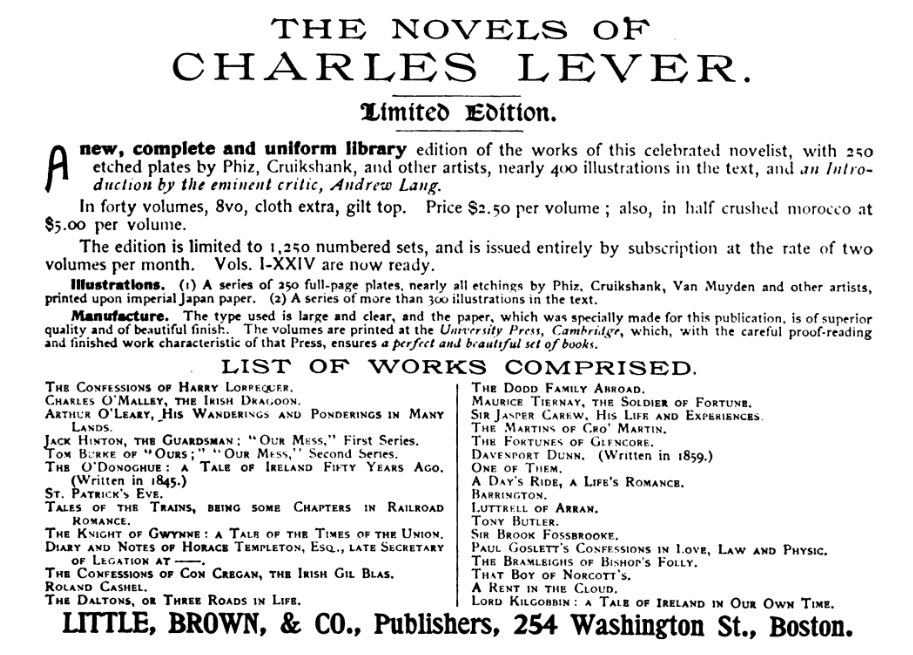
Advertisement for The Novels of Charles Lever in the Feb. 1895 edition of The Bookman (New York City)

- The Confessions of Harry Lorrequer Dublin, W. Curry, (1839)
- Charles O'Malley, the Irish Dragoon Dublin, William Curry, Jun. and Co. (1841)
- Jack Hinton, the Guardsman (1843)
- Tom Burke of "Ours" Dublin, William Curry, Jun. and Co. (1844)
- The O'Donoghue: a tale of Ireland fifty years ago Dublin, W. Curry, (1845)
- Nuts and Nutcrackers. London, W. S. Orr, (1845)
- Arthur O'Leary: His wanderings and ponderings in many lands London, H. Colburn, (1845)
- The Knight of Gwynne; a tale of the time of the union London, Chapman and Hall, (1847)
- Confessions of Con Cregan: the Irish Gil Blas London, W. S. Orr, (1849)
- Roland Cashel London, Chapman and Hall, (1850)
- The Daltons, or, Three roads in life London, Chapman and Hall, (1852)
- The Dodd Family Abroad London, Chapman and Hall, (1854)
- The Martins of Cro'Martin London, Chapman and Hall, (1856)
- The Fortunes of Glencore London, Chapman and Hall, (1857)
- Davenport Dunn : a man of our day London, Chapman and Hall, (1859)
- One of Them London, Chapman and Hall, (1861)
- Barrington London, Chapman and Hall, (1863)
- A Day's Ride: A Life of Romance (1864)
- Luttrell of Arran London, Chapman and Hall, (1865)
- Sir Brook Fossbrooke Edinburgh, W. Blackwood, (1866)
- The Bramleighs of Bishop's Folly Vol. 1, London Smith, Elder and Co. (1868)
- A Rent in a Cloud London, Chapman & Hall, (1869)
- That Boy of Norcott's London, Smith, Elder, (1869)
- Lord Kilgobbin New York, Harper & Bros., (1872)
- The Bramleighs of Bishop's Folly London, Chapman and Hall, (1872)
- Tony Butler(1896)
- Sir Jasper Carew: His Life and Experiences (1904)

== See also ==
- Stage Irish
