= 71st Regiment of Foot, Fraser's Highlanders =

- Active: 1775–1786
- Country: Kingdom of Great Britain
- Branch: British Army
- Type: Infantry
- Size: One battalion (two battalions 1775–1783)
- Engagements: American Revolutionary War

The 71st Regiment of Foot was a British Army regiment of infantry raised in 1775, during the American Revolutionary War and unofficially known as Fraser's Highlanders. It was disbanded in 1786.

== History ==
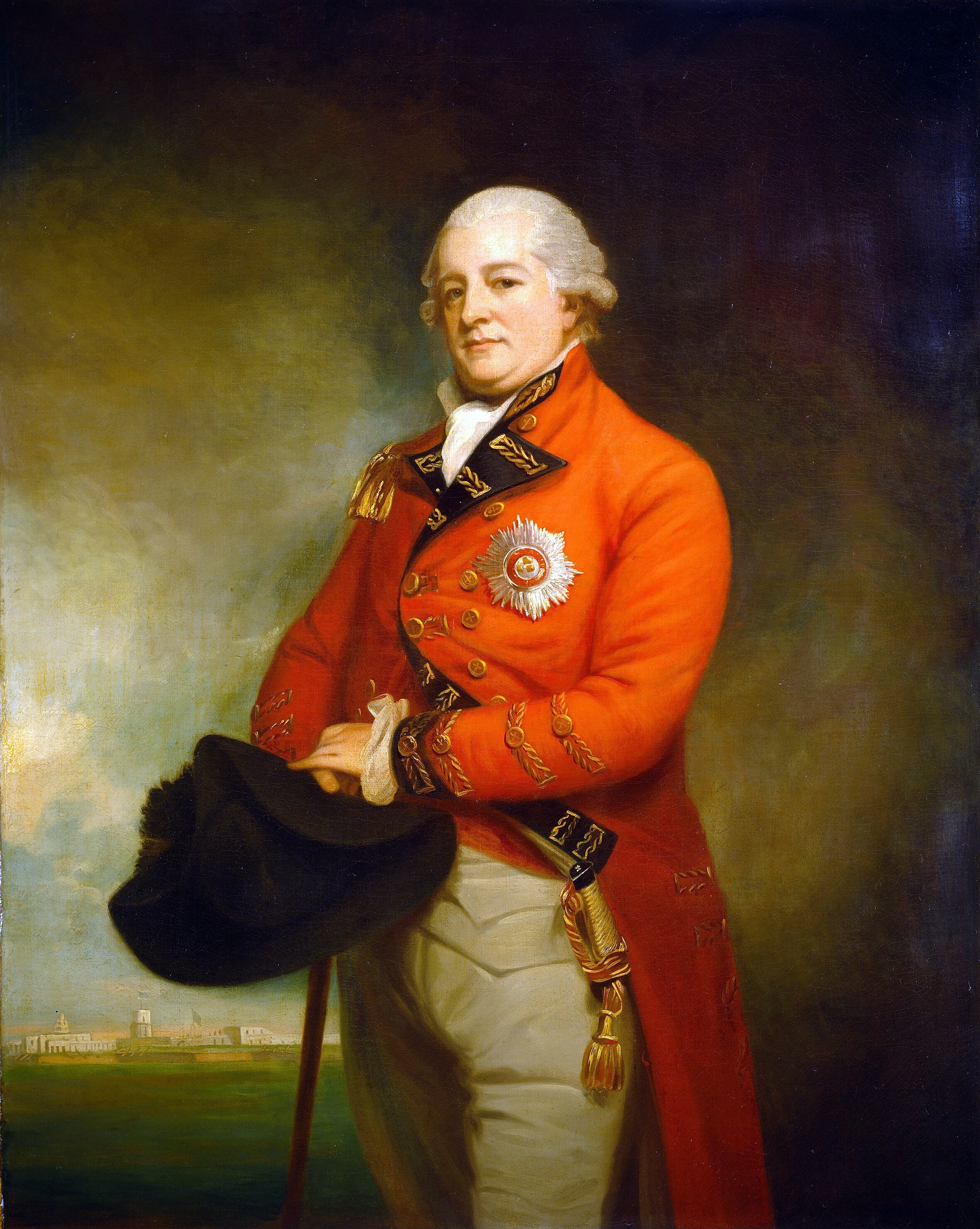
Lieutenant-Colonel Archibald Campbell who led the regiment to success at the Capture of Savannah in December 1778, by George Romney

=== Formation ===
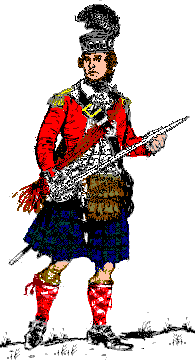
An officer of the 71st Regiment, 1776

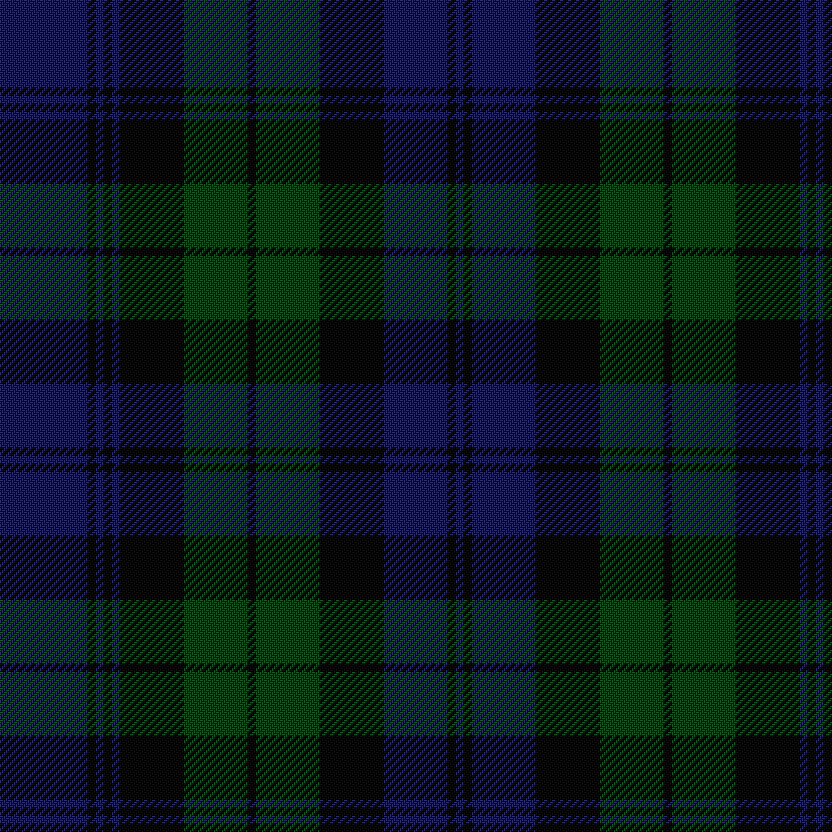
The Black Watch tartan worn by the regiment

The regiment was raised at Inverness, Stirling, and Glasgow by Lieutenant-General Simon Fraser of Lovat as the 71st Regiment of Foot in 1775. It was intended for service in the American Revolutionary War and was well received in Glasgow:

Their conduct was so laudable and exemplary as to gain the affections of the inhabitants, between whom and the soldiers the greatest cordiality prevailed.

The regiment embarked for North America in April 1776. During the journey some of the troops of the Cameron clan mutinied when they heard they would not be commanded by Captain Cameron of Lochiel but settled down when they heard that their commander was Captain Cameron of Fassifern. The ship arrived in New York City in July 1776 and the regiment was attacked by American troops on arrival at Boston Harbor.

=== Operations ===
The 71st Regiment of Foot joined General William Howe at Staten Island and was ordered into combat almost immediately. The grenadiers were commanded by Lieutenant Colonel Charles Stewart and the other companies were placed under the command of Brigadier Sir William Erskine. The regiment first saw action at the Battle of Long Island in August 1776; the British forces were successful and only three soldiers from the regiment were killed and only 11 wounded.

The next operation for the 71st Regiment was at the Battle of Fort Washington in November 1776 followed by the Battle of Fort Lee later that month. The regiment went on to take part in the Philadelphia Campaign and saw action at the Battle of Brandywine in September 1777. A detachment of 71st Regiment under Captain Colin MacKenzie supported General John Burgoyne's operations along the Hudson River including the capture of Forts Clinton and Montgomery in October 1777.

The regiment also took part in actions in the Southern theatre and fought under Lieutenant-Colonel Archibald Campbell at the Capture of Savannah in December 1778. At Savannah, Campbell ordered Sir James Baird to take a group of infantry and flank the Americans, while he arrayed his troops just out of view: the Americans were unaware they had been flanked, were routed and abandoned the city. The regiment, now under the command of Lieutenant Colonel John Maitland, went on take part in the Battle of Brier Creek in March 1779; at Brier Creek the 1st Battalion of the regiment attacked the Americans at the front while the 2nd Battalion attacked them from the rear: again the Americans were routed.

After that the regiment took part in the Siege of Savannah in September 1779: during this action the regiment successfully defended the city. The regiment was also present at the Siege of Charleston in March 1780, the Battle of Camden in August 1780 and the Battle of Cowpens in January 1781. It next fought at the Battle of Guilford Court House in March 1781 where one officer of the 71st Regiment claimed that "one half of the Highlanders dropped on that spot." The regiment's last action was at the Siege of Yorktown in September 1781.

=== Reorganisation ===
On 30 April 1782, the War Office notified Sir Guy Carleton, Commander in Chief of British forces in North America, that due to the death of Lieutenant General Fraser, the two battalions of the 71st were to be formed into two distinct units, the 71st Regiment under the command of Colonel Thomas Stirling of the 42nd Regiment, and the Second 71st Regiment under the command of the Earl of Balcarres who was appointed a Lieutenant Colonel Commandant. The latter unit was to be augmented by recruits to be raised in the Highlands of Scotland. All private men currently serving in both battalions in America, whether prisoners of war or not, were to be appointed to the new 71st Regiment, as were additional companies at Newfoundland, while additional companies in Britain were to be attached to the Second 71st. The newly organized 71st, consisting of 12 companies, was to continue in service in America, while the commissioned and non-commissioned officers of the Second 71st were to set sail for Britain at the first opportunity.

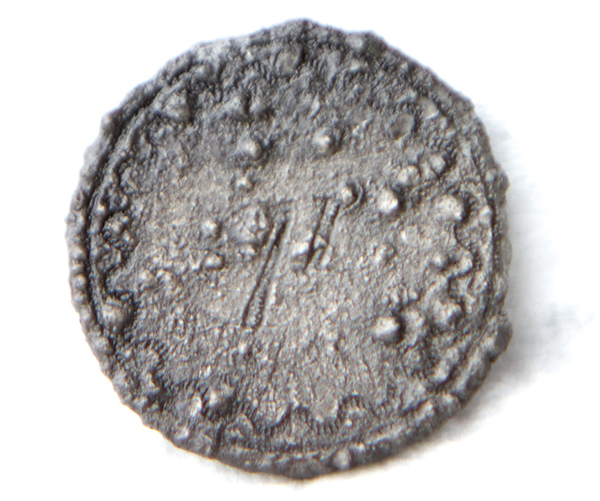
A pewter button from the uniform of a non-officer member of Fraser's Highlanders, recovered by archaeologists from the 1782 Storm Wreck

The two new 71st companies remained in South Carolina until the final evacuation of Charleston on 18 December 1782. The officers of the Second 71st set sail for England in the 203-ton ship Moor, while the remaining men of the 71st Regiment, numbering only 189, were to sail on the 319-ton ship Sally bound for Jamaica. Some of the ships leaving Charleston were bound for St. Augustine, Florida, and it appears likely that at least one member of the 71st was shipwrecked at that port, as archaeologists from the Lighthouse Archaeological Maritime Program have discovered a pewter button from a 71st Regiment uniform on a shipwreck site that appears to date to the 1782 evacuation of Charleston. The regiment was disbanded in Scotland in 1786.

== Uniform ==
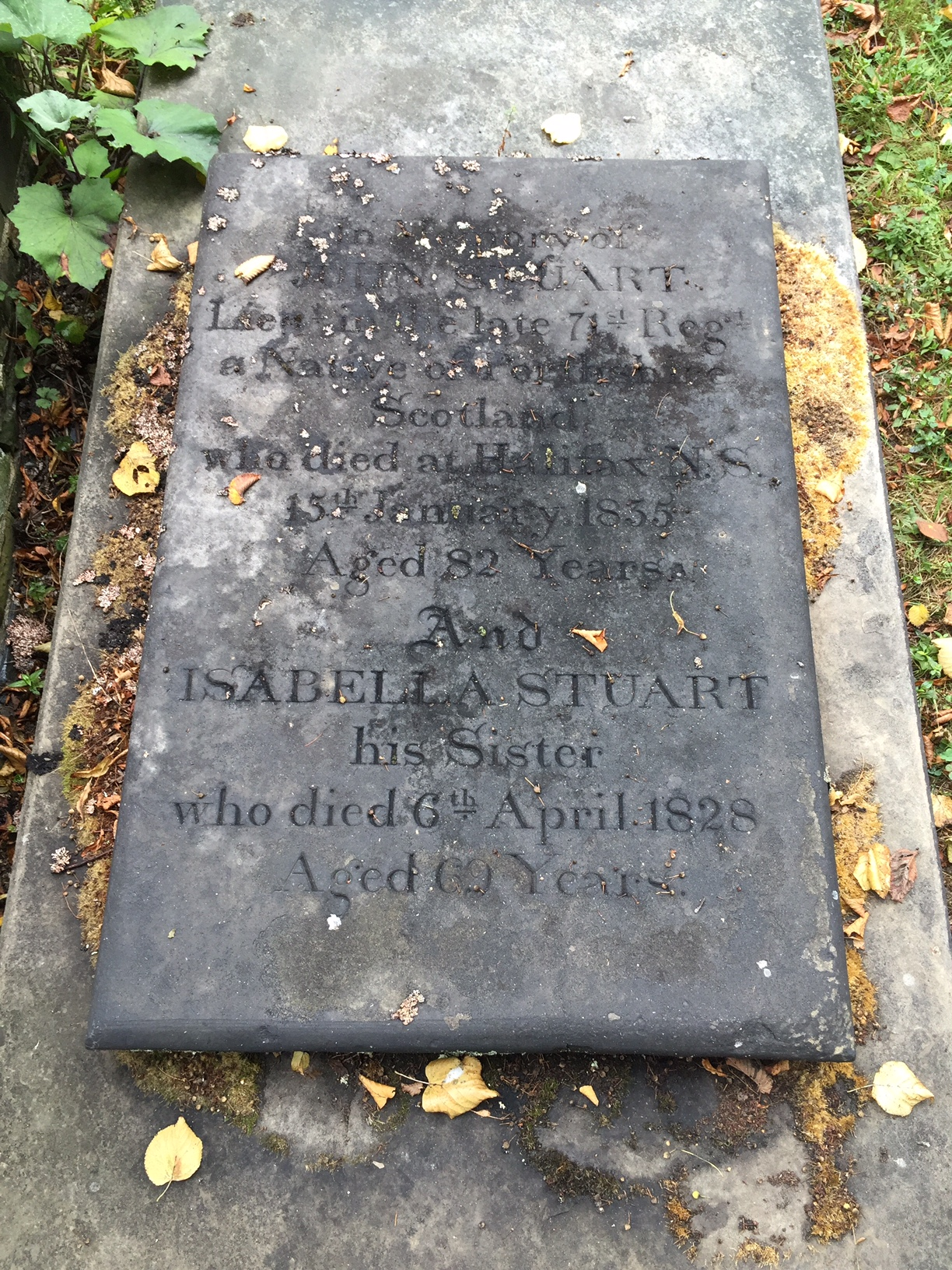
Lt. John Stuart, 71st Regiment, d. 1835 Old Burying Ground (Halifax, Nova Scotia)

The regiment's beating orders called for a uniform very similar to the 42nd Regiment of Foot. It included a diced bonnet, short red coat with white facings (collar, lapels, and cuffs) and white lace with a red worm, a Government Sett kilt, and diced hose. The kilt and hose were typically only worn while in garrison. In the field, the regiment wore the standard British Army gaitered trousers. In the summer, they were made of linen. In the winter, they commonly wore brown wool trousers, though in the winter of 1779/1780, they wore tartan trousers made from their old kilts. While issued swords and sword belts, the swords were left in storage and the sword belt was used to carry the bayonets. Accoutrements included an 18-round cartridge box worn around the stomach, as well as a pouch worn over the shoulder.

== Colonels ==
Colonels of the regiment were:

=== 71st Regiment of (Highland) Foot (Fraser's Highlanders) (1775–1786) ===
- 1775–1782: Lt-Gen. Hon. Simon Fraser of Lovat
- 1782–1786: Major-Gen. Thomas Stirling

== See also ==
- 78th Fraser Highlanders, an earlier regiment also raised by Simon Fraser of Lovat but for the French and Indian War
- Seventy-First High School, a high school in Fayetteville, North Carolina, named for the regiment

== Sources ==
- Keltie, John (1875). A history of the Scottish Highlands, Highland clans and Highland regiments, with an account of the Gaelic language, literature and music by Thomas Maclauchlan, and an essay on Highland scenery. William Mackenzie.
- Troiani, Don (1998). Troiani's Soldiers in America, 1754–1865. Stackpole. ISBN 978-0811705196.
