= Stirling baronets of Ardoch (1666) =

Escutcheon of the Stirling baronets of Ardoch

The Stirling baronetcy of Ardoch, parish of Muthill, was created on 2 May 1666 in the Baronetage of Nova Scotia for Henry Stirling. It was extinct in 1808 on the death of the 5th Baronet.

== Stirling baronets, of Ardoch (1666) ==
- Sir Henry Stirling, 1st Baronet (died 1669)
- Sir William Stirling, 2nd Baronet (died 1702)
- Sir Henry Stirling, 3rd Baronet (1688–1753)
- Sir William Stirling, 4th Baronet (c. 1730–1799)
- Sir Thomas Stirling, 5th Baronet (1733–1808). A major-general of the American Revolutionary War, he was a son of the 3rd Baronet and his wife Anne Gordon, daughter of the naval officer Thomas Gordon.
