= Muiravonside Country Park =

Country park in Falkirk, Scotland

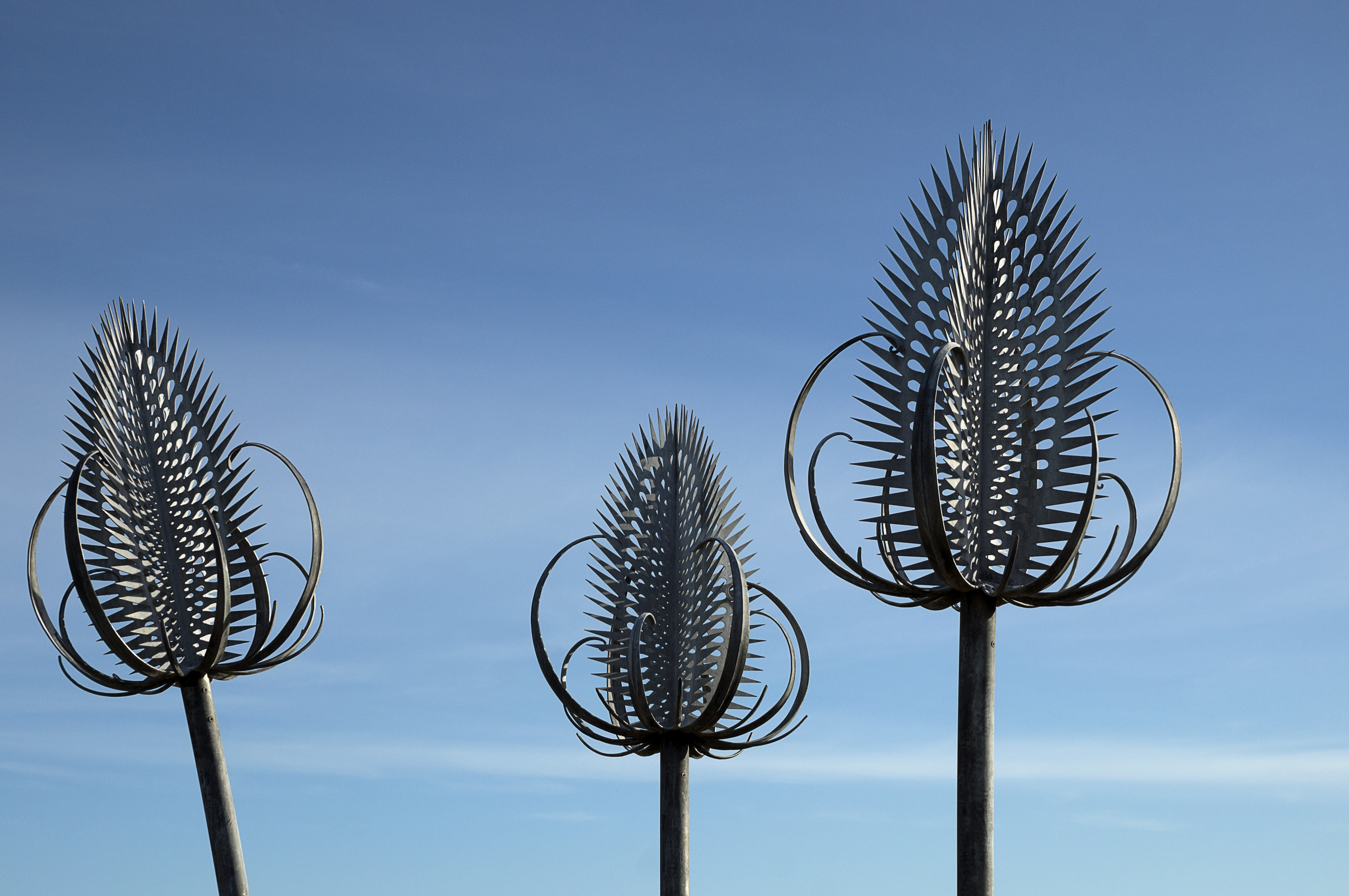
- Three Teasels sculpture
- Interactive map of Muiravonside Country Park
- Type: Country park
- Location: south-east corner of Falkirk (council area)
- Nearest town: Linlithgow
- Coordinates: 55.96044°N 3.656731°W
- Area: 170 acres (69 ha)
- Created: 1977
- Operator: Falkirk Council
- Open: All year

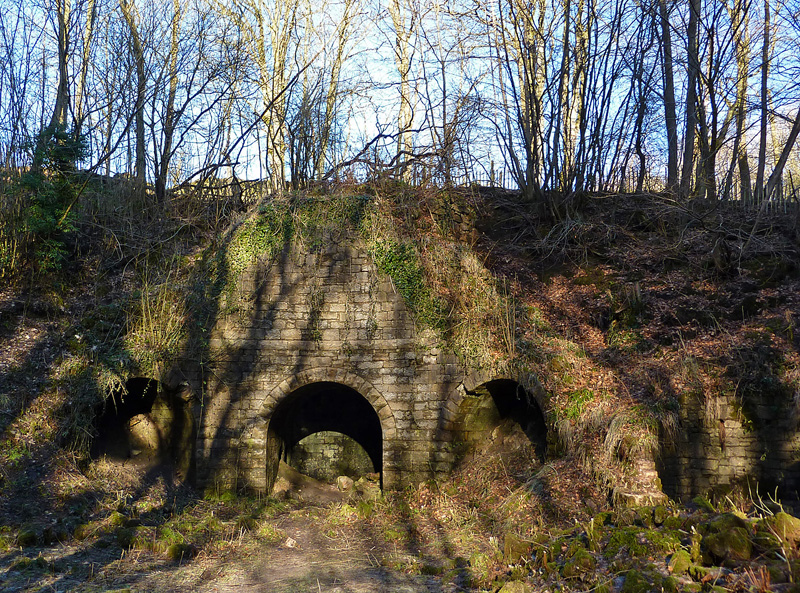
A Lime kiln in Muiravonside Country Park

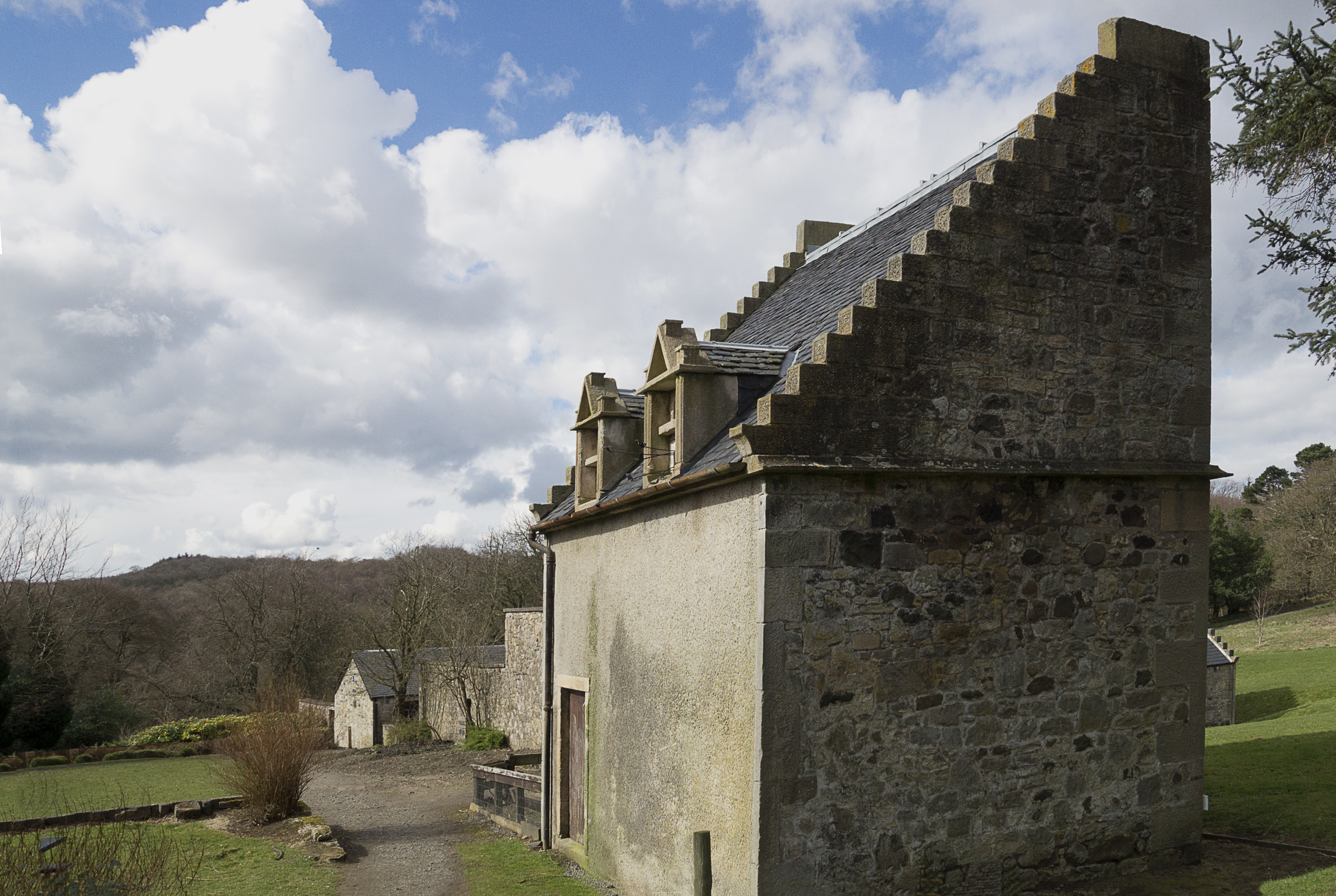
Dovecot (Scots:Doocot) at Muiravonside Country Park

Muiravonside Country Park is 170 acres of woodland and parkland open to the public all year round with marked trails, picnic sites and a play area. It is situated in the south-east corner of Falkirk (council area), approximately 1 mile (1.6 km) south of Maddiston, 2 miles (3.2 km) south-east of Linlithgow and about 4 miles (6.4 km) north of Armadale and Bathgate. It was once the grounds of Muiravonside House and the country estate owned by the Stirling family of Falkirk.

== Description ==
The park forms part of the River Avon Heritage Trail past the historic Avon Aqueduct and relics of industry and farming, including a Lime Kiln, hydro-powered sawmill and restored listed 17th-century doocot. The old Home Farm now forms the visitor centre, which was closed for renewal but is now open. The Newparks Farm has been transformed into an animal attraction with many breeds of animals and birds. Over 90 species of bird have been recorded at the park.

In 2016, a Heritage Lottery grant and money from a nearby landfill site allowed the park to expand and improve its trails, with the introduction of seven specially commissioned sculptures.

== History ==
Reginald Prat de Tindale gave the estate to his daughter, Margaretta, upon her marriage to Richard de Miville in 1189. The hub of the estate was the, now ruined, Anglo-Norman 'Maiden Castle' located just outside the country park. Around this time the land is referred to as "Murgunessete" or 'the abode of Morgan'.

In 1471, the estate came into the Ross family by marriage. Sir John Ross fell at the Battle of Flodden in 1513, who was heir to the estate. the estate stayed in the Ross family, during which time the first Muiravonside House was built in 1609. This was extended in the 18th and 19th centuries.

=== McLeods ===
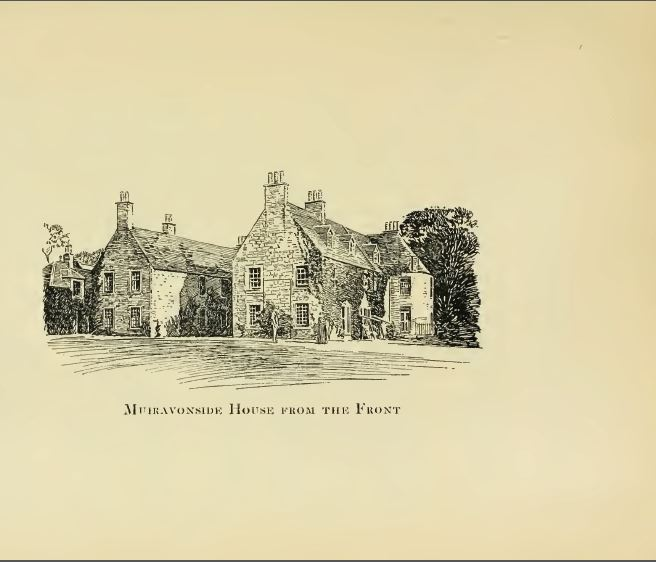
Muiravonside House

In 1724, the estate was sold to John MacLeod, an Edinburgh advocate. This family had a long history of supporting the return of the Stuarts to the throne, Alexander McLeod, who stayed at Muiravonside, was one of Bonnie Prince Charlie's aide de camp. Leading up to the Jacobite rising of 1745 these Jacobite sympathisers were amongst those plotting the return of the Stuarts. Also involved was a leading Scottish advocate and friend of the Macleods, Lord Grange, whose wife, Rachel Chiesley, threatened to expose his Jacobite sympathies and his plot for the crown. After being abducted on 22 January 1732, she was held at Muiravonside house temporarily, before being incarcerated in various remote locations on the western isles of Scotland, including the Monarch Isles, Skye and the Hirta, an island of St Kilda.

=== Stirlings ===
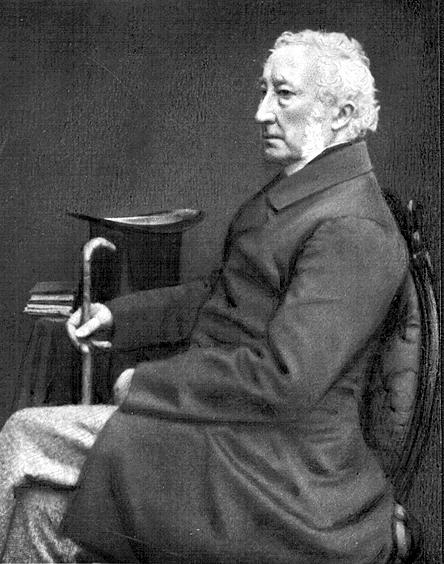
Charles Stirling died at Muiravonside in 1867

In 1835, the estate was sold to Charles Stirling, whose sixteen children included General Sir William Stirling K.C.B. This was a time of agricultural improvement in Scotland and Sir Charles Stirling aimed to make the estate as self-sufficient as possible. He built the lime kilns, that can still be seen on the estate, and his own clay drain works. He turned an old grain mill into a sawmill and oversaw the Muiravonside Coalfield, which had been operating since the 18th century. Charles was not the first to marry his cousin and Charles married Charlotte Dorothea Stirling who was the daughter of the late Vice-Admiral Sir Charles Stirling in 1835. They had four sons and three daughters. When Charles died in 1867 at Muiravonside, the estate went to his eldest son Andrew who was a lawyer.

During World War I, 11 British soldiers were billeted in the house, which was, by then, partially let out. Thomas Willing Stirling, last of the Stirlings to be buried in the family burial ground on the estate died in 1930, the estate went to his eldest son Sir Arthur Charles Stirling, who remained there until his death on 21 February 1967. It was his intention, having no male heir, the estate should go to his sister. However Stirling's cousin, Sir Norman Charles Stirling objected on the grounds of entail, which resulted in long and protracted court proceedings. Ten years later the case, Stirling TRS vs Stirling, was settled in favour of Sir Arthur Charles will, by then the house was ruined. A considerable amount of money would be needed to make the estate again viable. The new owner being of considerable age and with no intimate concern for the estate, sold part of the estate to what was then Falkirk District Council in 1977. The once grand house was deemed unsafe and it was demolished as part of the estate's restoration as Falkirk's first country park in the 1970s.

In 1980, the Countryside Ranger Service began its mission to educate and to provide information as well as to maintain the park's woodland and its walks. This has included helping with the installation of sculptures around the park. The sculptures are funded by the operators of a local landfill site.
