= William Hamilton Maxwell =

Scots-Irish novelist (1792–1850)

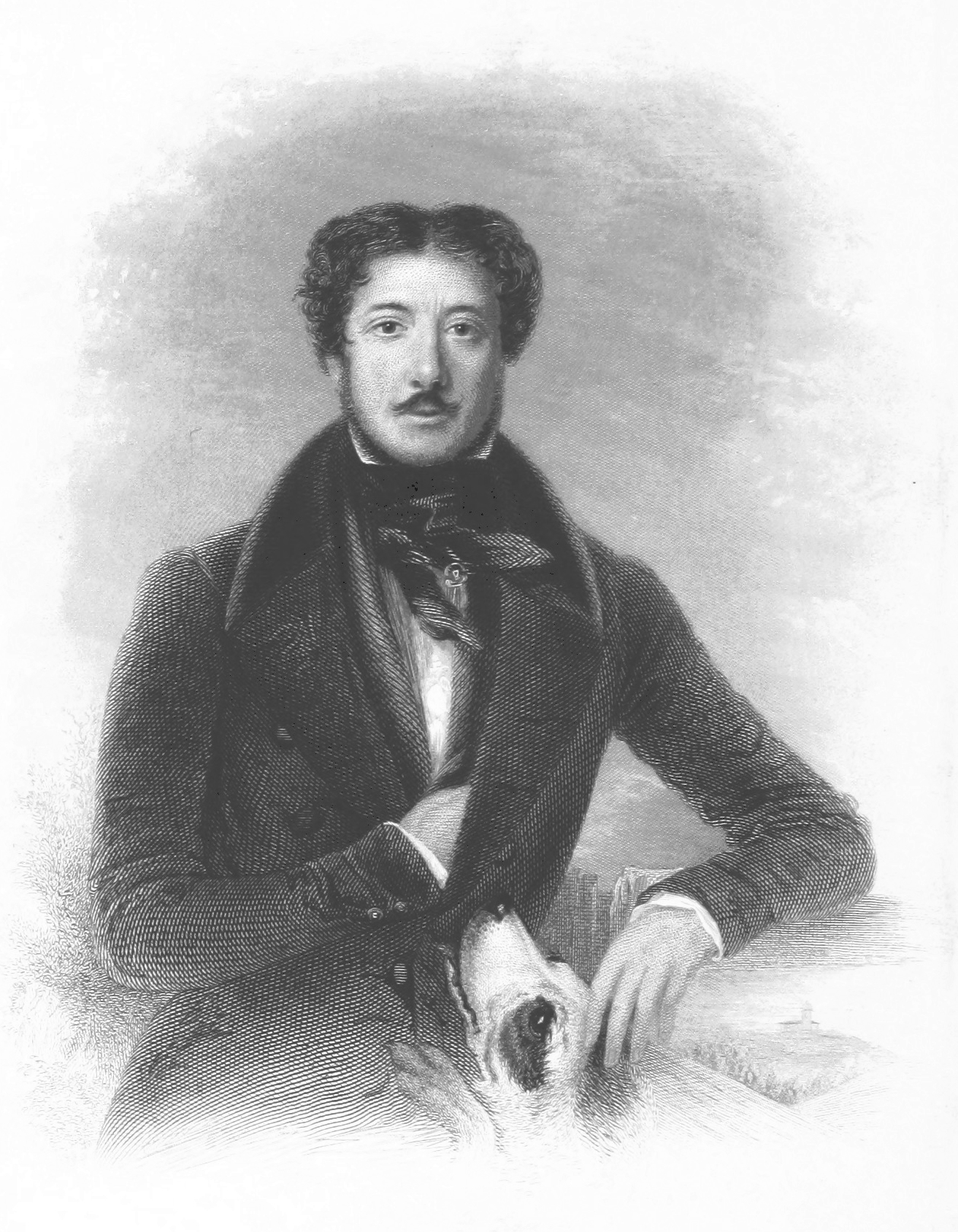
- 1844 portrait
- Born: 30 June 1792; Newry, County Down
- Died: 29 December 1850 (aged 58); Musselburgh, Scotland

William Hamilton Maxwell (30 June 1792 – 29 December 1850) was an Irish novelist, historian and clergyman.

== Biography ==
=== Early life and career ===
Maxwell William Hamilton, son of merchant James Maxwell and his wife, a daughter of William Hamilton, was born on 30 June 1792, in Market Street, Newry, County Down. Educated at David Henderson's Newry school and also Trinity College, Dublin, where he commenced his tertiary learning. He claimed to have entered the British Army and seen service in the Peninsular War and the Battle of Waterloo, but this is generally believed to be untrue. Compelled by circumstances, he pursued a path in holy orders. After his ordination in 1813, he was first assigned to the humble curacy of Clonallon, overlooking Carlingford Bay. Afterwards he took orders, but was deprived of his living for non-residence.

His novels, O'Hara (1825), and Stories from Waterloo (1834) started the school of rollicking military fiction, which culminated in the novels of Charles Lever. Maxwell also wrote a Life of the Duke of Wellington (1839–1841), and a History of the Irish Rebellion of 1798 (1845) - written in a spirit hostile to the rebels, and accompanied with similarly hostile illustrations by George Cruikshank.

Maxwell married Mary Dobbin, daughter of Thomas Dobbin.

=== Death ===
On 29 December 1850, William Hamilton Maxwell died in Musselburgh, Scotland. He was fifty-five years old.

== Publications ==
- Stories of waterloo : and other tales (1829)
- Wild Sports of the West. With Legendary Tales, and Local Sketches (1832)
- The Field Book, or Sports and pastimes of the United Kingdom compiled from the best authorities ancient and modern (1833)
- Captain Blake of the Rifles; or, My Life (1836)
- The Bivouac; Or, Stories of the Peninsular War (1837)
- Life of the Duke of Wellington (1839)
- History of the Irish rebellion in 1798 (1845)
- Hill-side and border sketches: with legends of the Cheviots and the Lammermuir (1847)
- The Fortunes of Hector O'Halloran, And His Man Mark Antony O'Toole (1853)
- Life, Military and Civil, of the Duke of Wellington (1865)
- The Victories of Wellington and the British Armies (1891)
