= Wilhelm Esser =

German philosopher and classical philologist (1798–1854)

- Born: February 21, 1798; Düren, Holy Roman Empire
- Died: 1854 (aged 55–56)
- Education: University of Münster
- Occupations: Philosopher and educator
- Known for: System der Logik

Wilhelm Esser (1798–1854) was a German academic, logician, and philosopher. His works focused on logic, psychology, and moral philosophy. Esser is also identified as a post-Kantian logician.

== Biography ==
Esser was born on February 21, 1798, in Düren, Germany. He received his primary education in this North Rhine-Westphalian town, studying science under a Jesuit priest at Ratheim before attending a gymnasium at his hometown. In 1814, he moved to Cologne, where he studied philology, philosophy, and theology. He then moved to Münster to continue his studies.

After completing his education, Esser was contracted to work as an associate professor at the University of Münster in 1823. He was later promoted to a full professor of philosophy.

Esser died in 1854.

== Works ==
=== Logic ===
Kantian thought served as the basis of some of Esser's works on logic. In System der Logik, where he argued that logic is not a branch of psychology and that a formulation of logic requires a single psychological fact, he recognized Kant's role in reshaping logical theory. Like Krug, who was also a post-Kantian logician, Esser held that there should be four fundamental laws of logic. These are:

1. All that is identical to an object must be attributed to it.
2. To every object must be denied all that is opposed [Gegentheil] to it.
3. To every fully determinate object every possible mark either belongs or does not.
4. If one of two opposing marks should be affirmed or denied of an object, then there must be a sufficient ground on account of which this is attributed or denied it.

Esser's conceptualization of the above laws was distinguished from those by Wilhelm Traugott Krug on account of the differences in their formulation. Esser's notions were mainly concerned with the marks that belong to or don't belong to an object.

Esser's work on logic influenced the theories of thinkers such as Sir William Hamilton, who extensively drew from Esser's notion of the sense or quality of "necessary" in his definition of logic. As interpreted by Hamilton, Esser's view held that the necessity of a form of thought is contradistinguished from contingency due to its subjective nature so that a necessary form of thought is determined or necessitated by the nature of thinking itself. He also outlined his interpretation of “clearness”. While Hamilton view it as a property of concepts, where a concept is said to be clear “when the degree of consciousness is such as to enable us to distinguish it as a whole from others”, Esser maintained that if the object thought through the concept is sufficiently distinguished, then it is a clear one.

=== Universal law ===
Esser described the laws of thought as "certain fundamental convictions which mind, absolutely identical to itself, grasping itself in its reality and causality, builds initially on itself and then, subsequently, also transfers to any other reality." According to him, if a form of thought is necessary and universal, then it is a law. He then defined a universal law as that which applies to "all cases without exception, and from which a deviation is ever, and everywhere, impossible, or at least, unallowed."

== Publications ==
- System of logic, Elberfeld 1823.
- Moral philosophy, Coppenrath, Münster 1827.
- Memorandum to Georg Hermes, DüMont-Schauberg, Cologne 1832.
- Franz von Fürstenberg’s life and work, Deiters, Münster 1842.
- Psychology, 2 volumes, Cazin, Münster, 1854.
