= Stirling baronets of Glorat (1666) =

The Stirling baronetcy of Glorat in Stirlingshire was created on 30 April 1666 in the Baronetage of Nova Scotia for George Stirling, son of the Royalist Mungo Stirling of the Wars of the Three Kingdoms.

The title is marked "dormant" on the Official Roll of the Baronetage.

== Stirling baronets, of Glorat (1666) ==
- Sir George Stirling, 1st Baronet (died c. 1680)
- Sir Mungo Stirling, 2nd Baronet (died 1712)
- Sir James Stirling, 3rd Baronet (died 1771)
- Sir Alexander Stirling, 4th Baronet (died 1791)
- Sir John Stirling, 5th Baronet (died 1818)
- Sir Samuel Stirling, 6th Baronet (1783–1858)
- Sir Samuel Home Stirling, 7th Baronet (1830–1861)
- Sir Charles Elphinstone Fleming Stirling, 8th Baronet (1831–1910)
- Colonel Sir George Murray Home Stirling, 9th Baronet (1869–1949), Lord Lieutenant of Stirlingshire 1936–1949. He survived his two sons, leaving three daughters.
