= William Sterling =

William Sterling may refer to:

- William T. Sterling (1808–1903), American politician and pioneer from Wisconsin
- William Sterling (director), Australian producer and director
- William E. Sterling (1927–2005), suffragan bishop of the Episcopal Diocese of Texas

== See also ==
- William Stirling (disambiguation)
