= William Hamilton (physician) =

William Hamilton FRSE (31 July 1758 – 13 March 1790) was a Scottish physician and botanist. He was one of the founding members of the Royal Society of Edinburgh in 1783.

== Life ==
He was born in Glasgow on 31 July 1758, the son of Isabel Anderson, daughter of William Anderson, who taught ecclesiastical history at Glasgow University from 1721 to 1752, and Prof Thomas Hamilton (died 1782), professor of anatomy and botany at the University of Glasgow.

He attended Glasgow Grammar School, then the University of Glasgow graduating with an MA in 1775. He then studied medicine, first at the University of Edinburgh and then from 1777 in London under Prof William Hunter, acting as Hunter’s demonstrator in his dissecting rooms.

In 1780 he returned to Glasgow to take over his ailing father’s anatomy classes. When his father died in 1782, he was granted his professorship in anatomy and botany. He continued in this role until his death, also practising at the Glasgow Royal Infirmary in obstetrics.

In 1789 he visited Tuscany, probably on health grounds. His son Thomas was born there. He died on 13 March 1790.

== Family ==
In 1783 he married Elizabeth Stirling. Their children included Thomas Hamilton and Sir William Hamilton, 9th Baronet of Preston
