= Glorat House =

Coordinates: 55.974°N 4.1785°W

Glorat House is a 19th-century mansion house in East Dunbartonshire, Scotland. It is located in Milton of Campsie, in the former county of Stirlingshire. The house is a category B listed building.

Glorat was the home of the Stirling family of Glorat, created baronets in 1680. A tower house stood on the site in 1510. In the 17th century the tower was replaced by a larger house: a lintel survives dated 1625 and bearing the initials MS for Mungo Stirling. The house was extensively rebuilt in the Scots Baronial style in 1869, though some 17th-century masonry remains. In 1879 a tower was added. The 60-hectare (150-acre) gardens were laid out in the first half of the 19th century.
