= Stirling-Hamilton baronets =

Baronetcy in the Baronetage of Nova Scotia

Escutcheon of the Stirling-Hamilton baronets of Preston, Haddington

The Hamilton baronetcy of Preston, Haddingtonshire was created in the Baronetage of Nova Scotia on 5 November 1673, for William Hamilton, eldest son of Sir Thomas Hamilton, of Preston and Fingalton, by his second wife, Anne Hamilton, of Preston. He married in 1670 Rachel Nicolson of Cockburnpath, but left no male issue, sold his estates, and died c.1690, having left Scotland for the Netherlands. The title passed to his brother Robert, 2nd Baronet. On his death, the title was regarded as dormant, until legal cases in the 19th century saw it revived, and imputed to successors. The name was changed to Stirling-Hamilton in 1889.

== Stirling-Hamilton baronets, of Preston, Haddington (1673) ==
- Sir William Hamilton, 1st Baronet (c. 1645–c. 1690)
- Sir Robert Hamilton, 2nd Baronet (1650–1701)
- Sir Robert Hamilton, 3rd Baronet (died c. 1720)
- Sir William Hamilton, 4th Baronet (6 March 1681 – 25 May 1749)
- Sir Robert Hamilton, 5th Baronet (1714–1756)
- Sir William Hamilton, 6th Baronet (1748–1756)
- Sir John Hamilton, 7th Baronet (c. 1750 – 1778)
- Sir Robert Hamilton, 8th Baronet (1754 – 8 June 1799)
- Sir William Stirling Hamilton, 9th Baronet (1788 – 6 May 1856)
- Sir William Stirling-Hamilton, 10th Baronet (17 September 1830 – 26 September 1913)
- Sir William Stirling-Hamilton, 11th Baronet (4 December 1868 – 7 October 1946)
- Sir Robert William Stirling-Hamilton, 12th Baronet (5 April 1903 – 14 February 1982)
- Sir Bruce Stirling-Hamilton, 13th Baronet (5 August 1940 – 17 September 1989)
- Sir Malcolm William Bruce Stirling-Hamilton, 14th Baronet (born 6 August 1979)

== See also ==
- Hamilton baronets
- Stirling baronets
