= Sir Thomas Stirling, 5th Baronet =

British army officer (1733–1808)

General Sir Thomas Stirling Bt
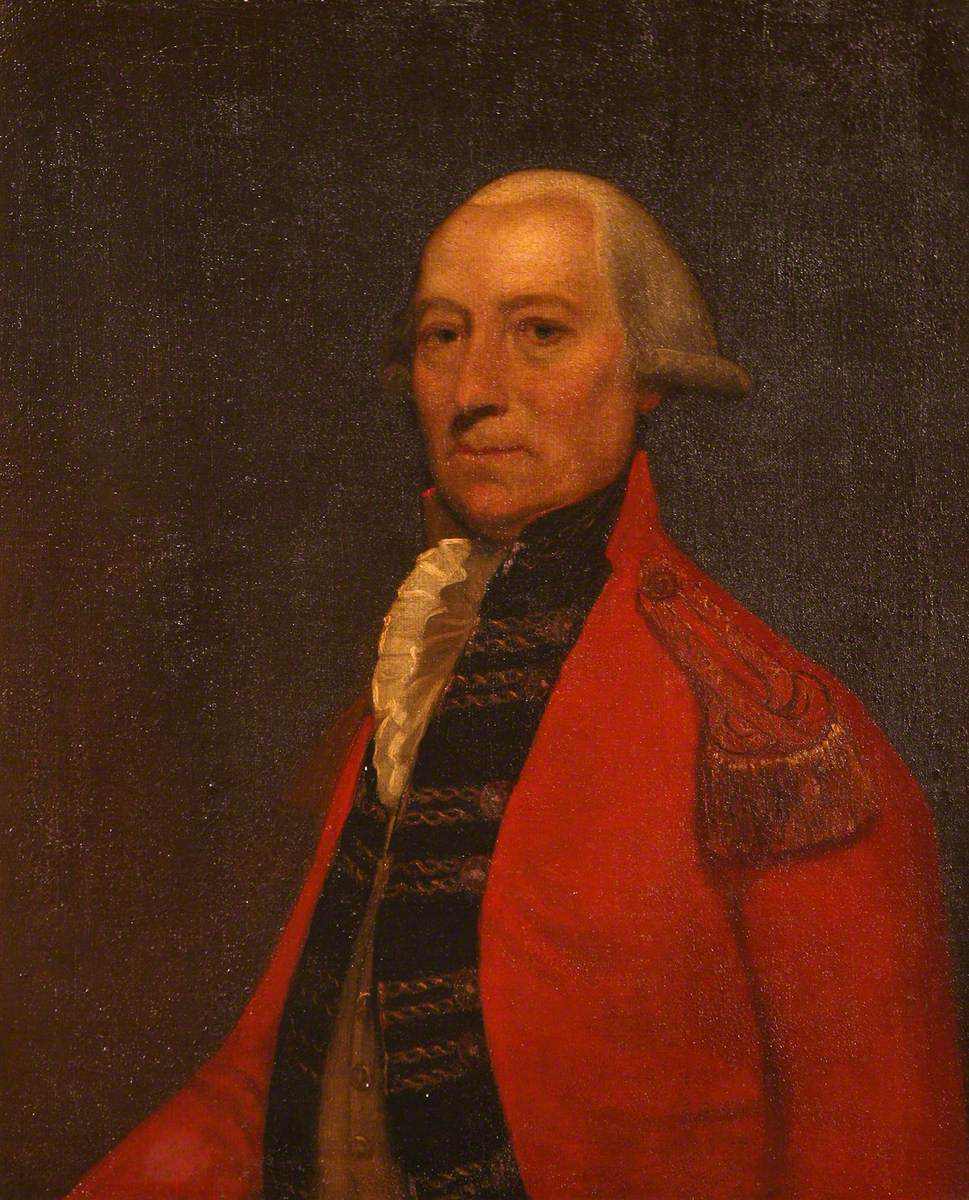
- Portrait attributed to Benjamin Marshall
- Born: 8 October 1733; Perthshire, Scotland
- Died: 8 May 1808 (aged 74); Perthshire, Scotland
- Military career
- Allegiance: Dutch Republic; Great Britain; United Kingdom
- Branch: Dutch States Army; British Army
- Rank: General
- Unit: Scots Brigade
- Commands: 42nd Regiment of Foot; 71st Regiment of Foot; 41st Regiment of Foot
- Conflicts: French and Indian War; Seven Years' War; Invasion of Martinique (1759); Siege of Havana; American War of Independence; Battle of Fort Washington; Battle of Springfield (WIA)

General Sir Thomas Stirling, 5th Baronet (8 October 1733 – 8 May 1808) was a British army officer who served in the French and Indian War, Seven Years' War and American War of Independence.

== Early life ==
Thomas Stirling was born on 8 October 1733 in Perthshire, Scotland, a scion of the Stirling baronets of Ardoch. He was the second son of Sir Henry Stirling, 3rd Baronet and his wife Anne.

== Military career ==
Stirling was commissioned into the Dutch States Army's Scots Brigade on 11 October 1747 and served in the brigade for a decade for transferring to the British Army as a captain in the 42nd Regiment of Foot, having raised a regimental company which he was placed in command of. In 1758 he was sent to North America and served in the French and Indian War. Stirling participated in the conquest of Canada as well as the invasion of Martinique in 1759 and siege of Havana in 1762. Following the war's end in 1763, in October 1765 he left Fort Pitt and travelled to Fort de Chartres and took possession of the Illinois Country for the British Crown.

In 1767 Stirling returned to Britain with his regiment where he was promoted to major on 12 December 1770 and lieutenant colonel on 7 September 1771. Following the outbreak of the American War of Independence in 1775 he expanded his regiment from 350 to 1,200 men in five months and was sent with it to North America in 1776. Following his arrival Stirling commanded his regiment at the Battle of Fort Washington on 16 November. On 16 February he was promoted to colonel and appointed as an aide-de-camp to George III, and on the night of 25 February Stirling led 1,000 British troops from the 33rd and 42nd Regiments of Foot (along with light infantry of the foot guards) on a raid against a Continental Army outpost at Elizabethtown, New Jersey to capture the governor of New Jersey William Livingston, who lived just outside the town. Stirling's force surprised the outpost and captured a quantity of supplies along with several prisoners, though Livingston evaded capture and nearby American forces quickly rallied and drove the raiding party back to their boats by the morning of 26 February.

Stirling and his troops were thanked in the British general orders and on 23 June 1780 he commanded a brigade at the Battle of Springfield, where Stirling was shot in the thigh. He refused to allow his leg to be amputated as this would prevent him from seeing future active service, though the injury ultimately resulted in just that. Stirling was appointed as colonel of the 71st Regiment of Foot on 13 February 1782 and on 20 November was promoted to major general. On 13 January 1790 he was appointed as colonel of the 41st (Welch) Regiment of Foot and was promoted to lieutenant-general on 3 May 1796 and again to general on 1 January 1801.

== Later life and death ==
In 1794 Stirling bought the estate of Strowan in Perthshire. Following the death of his elder brother William on 26 July 1799 he succeeded to his baronetcy of Ardoch which became extinct upon the latter's death. Stirling died unmarried at Strowan on 8 May 1808, leaving his property to his sister's son, Thomas Graham of Airth, with reversion to Graham's second son, who took the additional name of Stirling.

Baronetage of Nova Scotia
Preceded by William Stirling	Baronet (of Ardoch); 1799–1808	Extinct
