= Thomas Hamilton (writer) =

British Army officer and writer

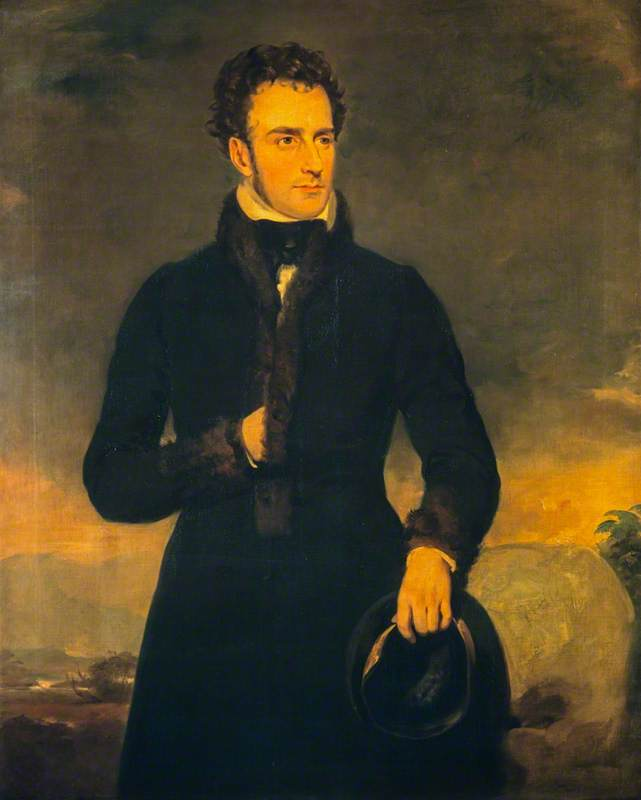
Portrait of Hamilton by John Watson Gordon

Captain Thomas Hamilton FRSE (1789 – 7 December 1842) was a British Army officer and writer.

== Life ==
He was born in Pisa, Tuscany, the second son of William Hamilton, professor of anatomy and botany at Glasgow. He was the younger brother of metaphysician Sir William Hamilton. Their father died a few months after Thomas was born.

After preliminary education at Glasgow, he was placed in 1801 as a pupil with the Rev. Dr. Home, in Chiswick, England, and some months later with the Rev. Dr. Scott, Hounslow, also in England. For several months in 1803, he was with Dr. Sommers at Mid Calder, Midlothian, preparatory to entering Glasgow University, where he matriculated the following November. He studied there for three years, proving himself an able if not very diligent student. His close college companion, of whom he saw little in later life, was Michael Scott, the author of Tom Cringle's Log.

Hamilton's bias was towards the joining the British Army, and in 1810, after fully showing his incapacity for business in Glasgow and Liverpool, he got a commission in the 29th Regiment of Foot. Twice on active service in the Peninsula, he received a serious wound in the thigh from a musket bullet at the Battle of Albuera. He was also in Nova Scotia and New Brunswick with his regiment, which at length was sent to France as part of the army of occupation.

About 1818, Hamilton retired, as a captain, on half-pay, fixing his headquarters at Edinburgh. He became a valued member of the Blackwood's Magazine writers. He was specially complimented in the song of personalities in the Noctes Ambrosianae for February 1826 (Noctes, i. 89). James Hogg in his Autobiography credits him with a considerable share in some of the "ploys" led by John Gibson Lockhart.

Hamilton married in 1820 Annette Montgomery Campbell, daughter of late Archibald Montgomery Campbell, Esq, of Upper Wimpole Street, private Secretary to Governor Campbell, and for several summers he and his wife lived at Lockhart's cottage of Chiefs wood, near Abbotsford House, Sir Walter Scott finding them very congenial neighbours and friends. In 1829, Captain and Mrs. Hamilton went to Italy, and at the end of the year Mrs. Hamilton died and was buried at Florence.

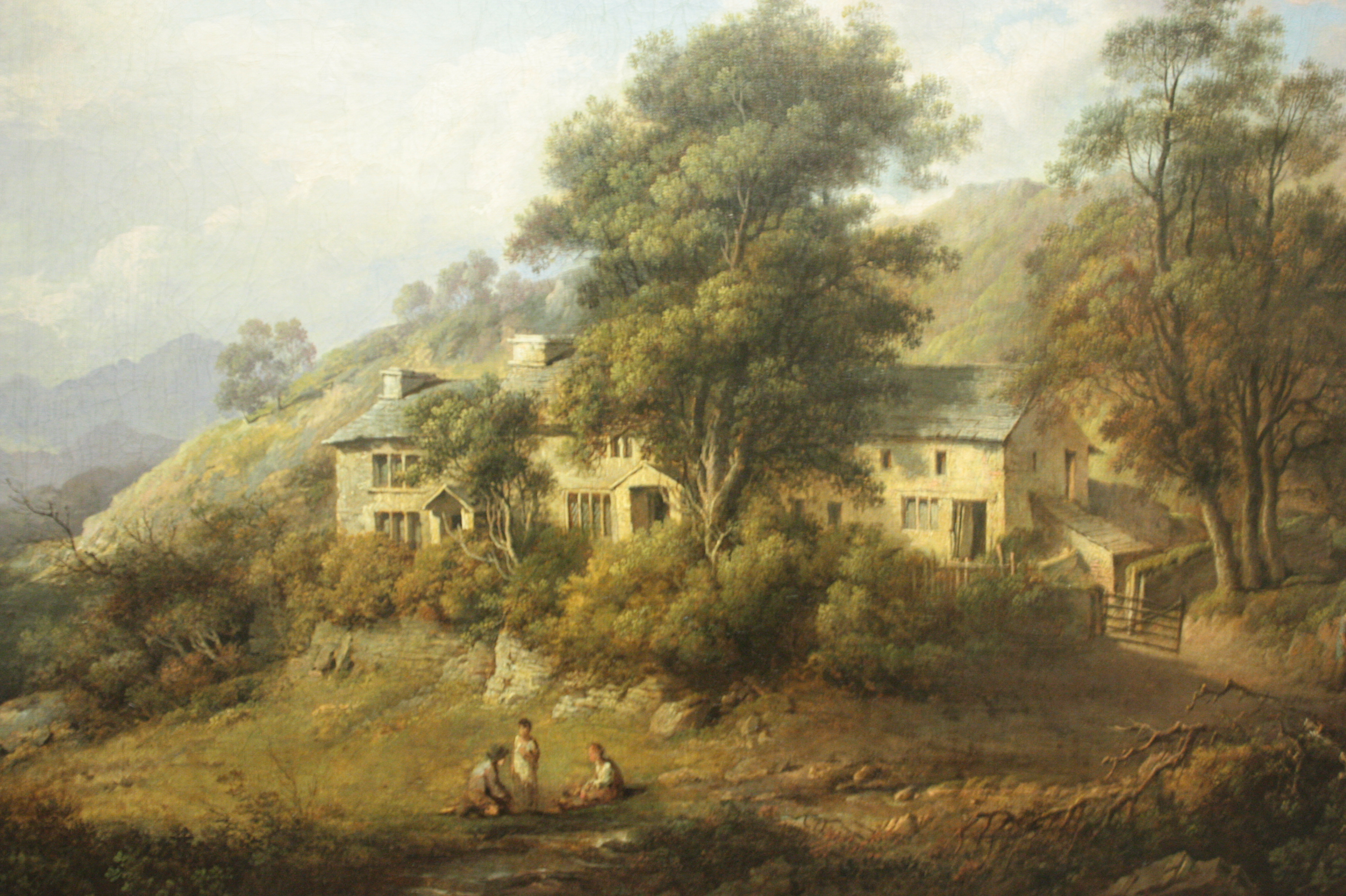
Hamilton's house, Elleray painted by Alexander Nasmyth (1808)

Some time after his return, Hamilton visited America, bringing back materials for a book on the Americans. Marrying a second time, the widow of Sir Robert Townsend Farquhar, bart., governor of the Mauritius, he settled at John Wilson's former house, Elleray, and saw much of Wordsworth, whom he was one of the first Scotsmen to appreciate. Visiting the continent with his wife, Hamilton was seized with paralysis at Florence, and he died at Pisa of a second attack 7 December 1842. He was buried at Florence beside his first wife.

== Works ==
Hamilton's novel Cyril Thornton appeared in 1827. It is partly autobiographical, with Hamilton's early impressions of Scottish university life and Glasgow citizens when he could call Govan "a pretty and rural village", and his military experiences. The book went through three editions in the author's lifetime, and was one of Blackwood's Standard Novels.

In 1829, Hamilton published Annals of the Peninsular Campaign. His Men and Manners in America appeared in 1833.

Craig Lamont has placed Thomas Hamilton within a "Glasgow School" of early nineteenth century Scottish novelists, along with John Galt and Michael Scott.
