= Clan Lennox =

Lowland Scottish clan

- Crest: Two broadswords in saltire behind a swan's head and neck all Proper.
- Motto: I'll defend

Profile
- Plant badge: A rose slipped Gules

Chief
- Edward Lennox of that Ilk and Woodhead,
- Baron of Antermony, Chief of the Name and Arms of Lennox.
- Seat: Leintwardine, UK
- Historic seat: Lennox Castle
Allied clans
Clan Kincaid (18th century)
Rival clans
Clan Kincaid (16th century)

Clan Lennox is a Lowland Scottish clan. The clan chiefs were the original Earls of Lennox, although this title went via an heiress to other noble families in the fifteenth and sixteenth centuries. The chiefship of the clan then went to the Lennox of Woodehead branch.

== History ==
=== Origins of the clan ===
The ancient earldom of Lennox once covered the whole of Dunbartonshire, as well large parts of Perthshire, Renfrewshire and Stirlingshire. In Scottish Gaelic, Leven-ach means a smooth stream. The ancient Celtic Mormaers of Levenax became the Earls of Lennox. The origins of the earldom, that had been established by the twelfth century, are disputed. One theory is that a Saxon baron named Arkyll received from Malcolm III of Scotland lands in Dunbartonshire and Stirlingshire. Also that Arkyll married a Scottish heiress and had a son who was Ailín I, Earl of Lennox. Other historians have said that the earldom of Lennox was conferred to David, Earl of Huntington from his older brother, William the Lion and that the Lennox family was not established until after the reign of William.

=== Wars of Scottish Independence ===
By the end of the thirteenth century, the Earls of Lennox were amongst the most powerful nobles in Scotland. Malcolm, 5th Earl of Lennox supported Robert the Bruce's claim to the Scottish Crown. Malcolm led his Lennox men into England and besieged Carlisle in 1296. Malcolm also swore fealty to Edward I of England, appearing on the Ragman Rolls, but he was later one of the mainstays of Robert the Bruce in the struggle for Scottish independence.

=== 15th and 16th centuries ===
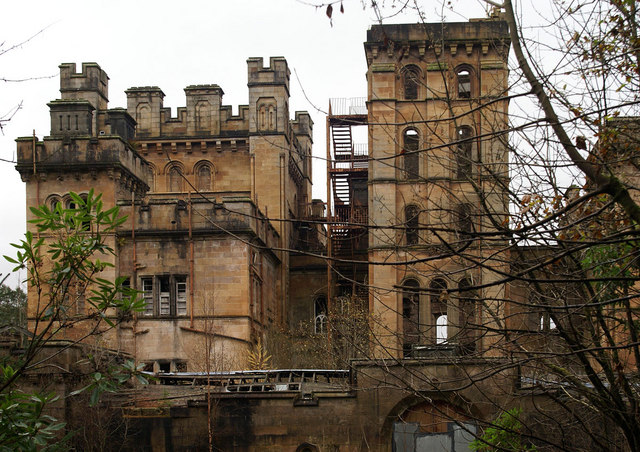
Lennox Castle, historic seat of the Earls of Lennox and later the Lennoxes of Woodehead, chiefs of Clan Lennox.

Malcolm's son was present at the coronation of Robert II of Scotland but he died two years later without male issue, and so the earldom passed through his daughter, Margaret, Countess of Lennox, to Walter de Fasselane. Margaret and her husband resigned the title to the Crown but it was re-granted to their son, Duncan, Earl of Lennox.

Duncan, Earl of Lennox's daughter was Isabella, Countess of Lennox who married Murdoch Stewart, Duke of Albany. When James I of Scotland returned from captivity in England, Lennox became a victim of king's hatred to all those connected with Albany's father who had murdered the king's brother and presided over Scotland into disorder. The Earl of Lennox was beheaded aged eighty in May 1425. The widowed Isabella of Lennox was imprisoned in Tantallon Castle along with her son, Walter de Levenax but he was later transferred to the Bass Rock. Upon release, Isabella was allowed to return to her island residence of Inchmurrin on Loch Lomond.

After this the succession to the title of Earl of Lennox was disputed and passed to several different noble families. Isabella, Countess of Lennox had two sisters, Margaret and Elizabeth, who both left descendants who claimed the vast estates. From Margaret Lennox descend the Menteiths of Rusky and from Elizabeth Lennox descend the Stewarts of Darnley. In 1488 John Stewart, Lord Darnley assumed the title of Earl of Lennox. His son was Matthew Stewart, the second Stewart Earl of Lennox who was killed at the Battle of Flodden in 1513. The title remained with Stewarts of Darnley until Henry Stuart, Lord Darnley, husband of Mary, Queen of Scots was murdered in 1567 and Mary herself was executed in 1587. The Earl of Lennox title then went to the young James VI of Scotland, which he later granted to his uncle, Charles Stuart. The title later passed to Esmé Stewart who was created Duke of Lennox in 1581. It later passed to Charles II of England and from him to his illegitimate son, Charles Lennox, 1st Duke of Richmond.

==== Lennoxes of Woodhead ====
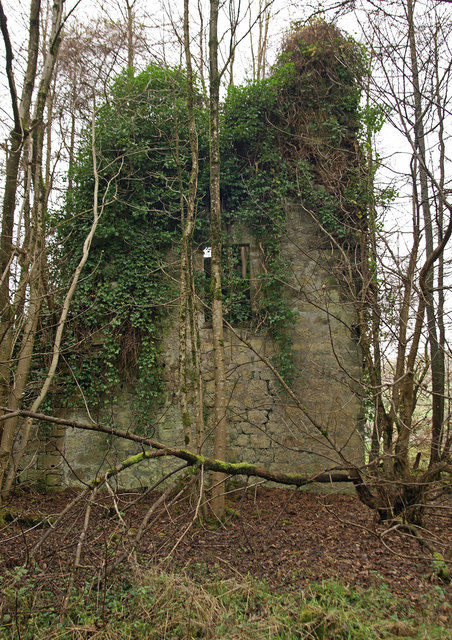
Woodhead Castle, seat of the Lennox of Balcorrach and Woodhead branch of the clan.

A branch of the Clan Lennox, the Lennoxes of Woodhead, feuded with the Clan Kincaid in the 1570s. The feud has been commented by some historians as remarkable because it was due to a marriage with the Lennox family that the Kincaid name was later re-established as an independent clan in the twentieth century.

=== 19th century and restored chiefship ===
In the 19th century the Lennox of Woodhead family who resided at Lennox Castle claimed the right to succeed to the title and honours of the ancient Earls of Lennox. Although their claim to the earldom in the peerage was not established, they were officially recognised as chiefs of the family name of Lennox. The Lennoxes of Woodhead sold Lennox Castle in 1927 to the city of Glasgow and their seat became Downton Castle, near Ludlow, England. This was sold to a Greek Owner in 1979. The Lennox family sold all of their ancestral lands in the mid-1980s. They are the present chiefs of Clan Lennox.

== Clan chief ==
- Chief: Edward Lennox of that Ilk and Woodhead, Chief of the Name and Arms of Lennox.
- Arms: Argent, a saltire between four roses Gules.

== Clan society ==
By constitution dated 31 May 2017, the Lennox clan chief organized his clan into a society known simply as "Clan Lennox," and he appointed officers and an international council of commissioners. The executive administrative officer of the clan is titled the Clan Chamberlain. The first chamberlain is Gordon Lennox, a solicitor from Glasgow, Scotland. The clan's website is https://clanlennox.org .

== Clan castles ==
Castles that have belonged to the Clan Lennox have included amongst others:

- Antermony Castle, near Milton of Campsie, is the site of a castle that was originally held by the Flemmings but later passed to the Lennox family.
- Balcorrach Castle, near Milngavie, Dunbartonshire is the site of a castle that was held by a branch of the Lennox family who descended from Donald, son of Duncan, 8th Earl of Lennox.
- Balloch Castle, in Dunbartonshire, was held by the original Earls of Lennox until 1425 when it passed to the Stewarts of Darnley who were made Earls of Lennox.
- Woodhead Castle, near Milngavie, Dunbartonshire, was held by the Lennox of Balcorrach branch of the clan in 1572. Woodhead Castle was left a ruin when nearby Lennox Castle was built in 1840. The latter was sold to the city of Glasgow in 1927 and the family moved to England.

== Tartan ==
Tartan image	Notes
	Lennox tartan or Lennox District tartan: reproduced from a lost sixteenth century portrait of the Countess of Lennox. The Lennox District tartan was reproduced from two known copies of a lost portrait dating from the sixteenth century, which was claimed to be of the Countess of Lennox (mother of Henry Stuart, Lord Darnley who married Mary, Queen of Scots). The tartan was reproduced by D. W. Stewart in his book Old and Rare Scottish Tartans published in 1893. Scottish Tartans World Register #935

== See also ==
- Earl of Lennox
- Duke of Lennox
- Scottish clan
