= Bill Stirling =

Bill Stirling may refer to:

- Bill Stirling (cricketer) (1891–1971), Australian cricketer
- Bill Stirling (British Army officer) (1911–1983), commanding officer of 2SAS during WWII
