= John Stuart (Nova Scotia politician) =

Nova Scotian politician (1752–1835)

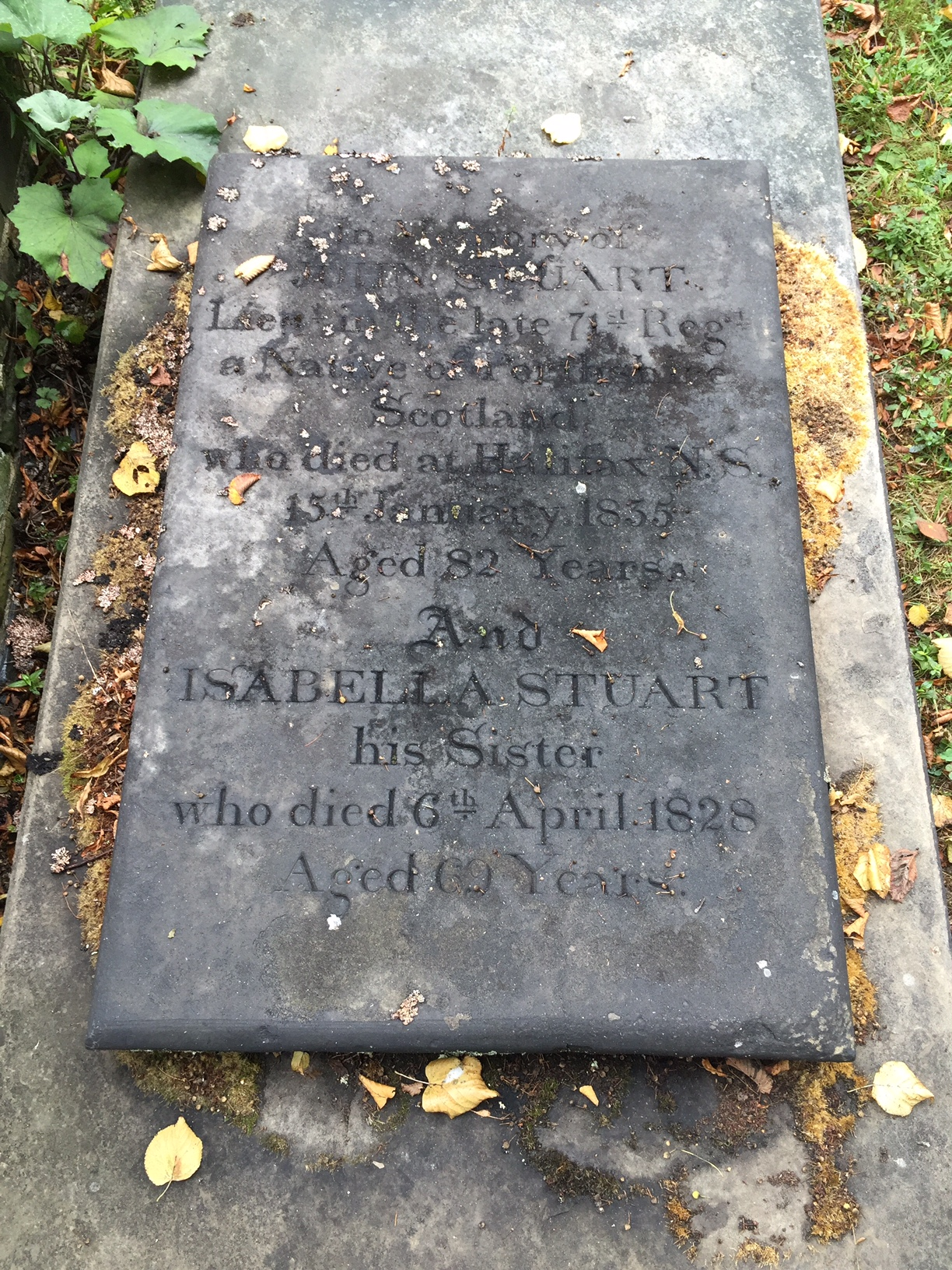
John Stewart, Old Burying Ground (Halifax, Nova Scotia)

John Stuart (1752 – January 15, 1835) was a Scottish-born lawyer and political figure in Nova Scotia. He represented Sydney County in the Legislative Assembly of Nova Scotia from 1793 to 1799.

He was born in Perthshire and served as a lieutenant in the 71st (Highland) Regiment of Foot. In 1784, he settled in Guysborough. Stuart served as custos rotulorum and sheriff for Sydney County. He also served as registrar of deeds. Stuart died in Halifax. He is buried in the Old Burying Ground (Halifax, Nova Scotia).
