= Michael Scott (Scottish author) =

British author (1789–1835)

Michael Scott (30 October 1789 – 7 November 1835) was a Scottish author and autobiographer who wrote under the pseudonym Tom Cringle.

== Life and work ==
Scott was born in Scotland at Cowlairs, near Glasgow, the son of a Glasgow merchant.

In 1806 he went to Jamaica, first managing some estates, and afterwards joining a business firm in Kingston. The latter post necessitated his making frequent journeys, on the incidents of which he based his best known book, Tom Cringle's Log.

I don't like Americans; I never did, and never shall like them. ... I have no wish to eat with them, drink with them, deal with, or consort with them in any way; but let me tell the whole truth, nor fight with them, were it not for the laurels to be acquired, by overcoming an enemy so brave, determined, and alert, and in every way so worthy of one's steel, as they have always proved.

— Michael Scott, on Americans after the War of 1812

In 1822 he left Jamaica and settled in Glasgow, where he engaged in business. Tom Cringle's Log began to appear serially in Blackwood's Magazine in 1829. Scott's second story, The Cruise of the Midge, was also first published serially in Blackwood's in 1834–1835. The first appearance in book-form of each story was in Paris in 1834. Both stories - "interesting autobiographical portraits of jamaica in the 1820s, written by a perceptive and sympathetic, but transient observer" - were originally published anonymously, and their authorship was not known till after Scott's death at Glasgow. Craig Lamont has placed Michael Scott within a 'Glasgow School' of early nineteenth century Scottish novelists, along with John Galt and Thomas Hamilton.
