= Stirling baronets =

Set index for Stirling baronets

There have been four baronetcies created for the surname Stirling, two in the Baronetage of Nova Scotia and two in the Baronetage of Great Britain. As of 2026, three of the baronetcies are extinct and one is dormant.

- Stirling baronets of Glorat (1666)
- Stirling baronets of Ardoch (1666)
- Stirling baronets of Mansfield (1792)
- Stirling baronets of Faskine (1800)

== See also ==
- Stirling-Hamilton baronets
