= Glorat =

Coordinates: 55.974°N 4.178°W

Glorat is a place and estate in the parish of Campsie in East Dunbartonshire, Scotland.

== History ==
A towerhouse was built at Glorat in the 16th century and Glorat House was built in the 17th century by Mungo Stirling.

Evidence of a mill and coal mining exist in the area.
