= Clan Kincaid =

Scottish clan

- Motto: This I'll Defend

Chief
- Madam Arabella Kincaid
- Of Kincaid
- Historic seat: Kincaid House; Lennox House
Allied clans
Clan Lennox (18th century)
Rival clans
Clan Lennox (16th century)
Clan Stirling (16th century)

Clan Kincaid is a Scottish clan.

== Origins of the clan ==
The chiefs of Clan Kincaid are said to be descended from several families including the ancient Earls of Lennox, the Galbraiths of Buthernock, the Grahames and also the Comyn Lords of Badenoch. The name Kincaid appears to have been of territorial origin. One explanation is that it comes from ceann-cadha that is Scottish Gaelic for the steep place or pass. Another translation is that it might mean of the head of the rock. Yet another possibility is that it means the head of the battle, ceann-catha, possibly referring to an achievement in the family history.

In 1238 an early reference to the name is found when Alexander II of Scotland granted the lands of Kincade to Maldouen, third Earl of Lennox. In the same year the Earl of Lennox granted the lands to Sir William Galbraith, 4th chief of Galbraith. The Galbraith's main castle was originally at Craigmaddie, but when the line ended in three sisters the estate was separated. One of the sisters married a Logan in 1280 and they received the lands of Kyncade by a charter from the fourth Earl of Lennox. The family then took their surname from the property, of which the spelling was then different. The Kyncade lands consisted of thirty thousand acres, extending from the River Kelvin to the River Glazert.

== Wars of Scottish Independence ==
One member of the Kincaid family distinguished himself by gallant conduct against the English forces of Edward I of England and in 1296 successfully recaptured Edinburgh Castle. The Laird of Kincaid then held the office of constable of Edinburgh Castle until about 1314. In reference to this honorable feat, during the reign of Robert the Bruce the castle was added to the Kincaid shield as an honorable augmentation to his armorial bearings.

== 16th century and clan conflicts ==
The Kincaid family increased their landholdings in the east of the country from the late sixteenth century onwards. This included the estate of Craiglockhart, near Edinburgh that the Kincaids gained from an adventurous marriage. They later also added the estate of Bantaskin near Falkirk, the Blackness Castle near Linlithgow and the fields of Warriston that is now a suburb of Edinburgh.

Malcolm Kincaid lost his left arm in a clan skirmish in 1563. He was later also involved in a feud with the Clan Lennox of Woodhead in the 1570s. The same Malcolm Kincaid was killed in 1581 by a Stirling of Glovat. The feud with the Clan Lennox has been commented by some historians as remarkable because it was due to a marriage with the Lennox family that the Kincaid name was later re-established as an independent clan in the twentieth century.

In 1600 John Kincaid of Warriston was murdered by one of his grooms who had been in league with his wife. The groom was forced to confess and while Lady Kincaid was beheaded, the groom was broken on the wheel.

== 17th century and civil war ==
During the Scottish Civil War of the seventeenth century the Kincaids fought on the royalist side. However they largely campaigned in Ireland. The family suffered as a result of supporting the royalists and many of the name Kincaid emigrated to North America.

== 18th century and Jacobite risings ==
During the Jacobite rising of 1715 the Kincaids supported the exiled Stuarts and following the rising David Kincaid left Scotland and settled in Virginia. During the Jacobite rising of 1745 four sons of Alexander Kincaid, who was Lord Provost of Edinburgh and the King's Printer, fought a rearguard action after the Battle of Culloden. They were taken prisoner but managed to escape, taking a ship to America, and also settling in Virginia.

The principal line of Kincaids married into the Lennox family at the end of the eighteenth century. Over the next two centuries the two families were almost synonymous but the Kincaids have now re-established themselves as an independent family.

== The modern Kincaids of Kincaid ==
On 2 June 1959, Alwyne Cecil Peareth Kincaid-Lennox petitioned the Lord Lyon King of Arms to succeed to the coat of arms of his great-great-grandfather, John Kincaid of Kincaid, who had matriculated his Arms and Supporters on 29 July 1808. This John Kincaid of Kincaid married secondly Cecilia Lennox of Woodhead and their son, John Lennox Kincaid, became the legal representative of both the Kincaid and Lennox families upon the death of John Kincaid of Kincaid on 7 February 1832. John Lennox Kincaid Lennox had his coat of arms, the impaled arms of Lennox and Kincaid, matriculated on 12 June 1833. John Lennox Kincaid Lennox died without male heirs and the Kincaid of Kincaid name and coat of arms became dormant. Alwyne Cecil Peareth Kincaid-Lennox's petition was granted and he was recognised as chief of the name of Kincaid by the Lord Lyon King of Arms on 1 July 1959. He took on the name Alwyne Cecil Kincaid of Kincaid and began participating in activities to promote Kincaid as a new Scottish Clan.

Alwyne Cecil Kincaid of Kincaid died on 3 September 1983, and was succeeded by his niece, Heather Veronica Peareth Kincaid Lennox who then became Heather Veronica Kincaid of Kincaid. She matriculated her coat of arms on 16 August 1988. Madame Heather Veronica Kincaid of Kincaid was born in Glasgow, Scotland on 10 March 1918 and was the only child of William Mandeville Peareth Kincaid-Lennox and Eva St. Clair Donald. She was twice married; first to Lieutenant-Commander Denis Arthur Hawker Hornell and secondly to William Henry Allen (Hal) Edghill. Her only child, Denis Peareth Hornell, succeeded to the chiefship of Clan Lennox and became Denis Peareth Hornell Lennox of that Ilk. Madame Heather Veronica Kincaid of Kincaid died on 2 August 1999 in Shropshire, England.

Madame Heather Veronica Kincaid of Kincaid was succeeded by her granddaughter, Arabella Jane Kincaid Lennox. She matriculated her coat of arms on 26 January 2001 and assumed the name Arabella Jane Kincaid of Kincaid. She was married to Major Giles Vivian Inglis-Jones and they have five children. Arabella Jane Kincaid of Kincaid is represented by the Clan Kincaid Organization based in the United States.

== Castles ==
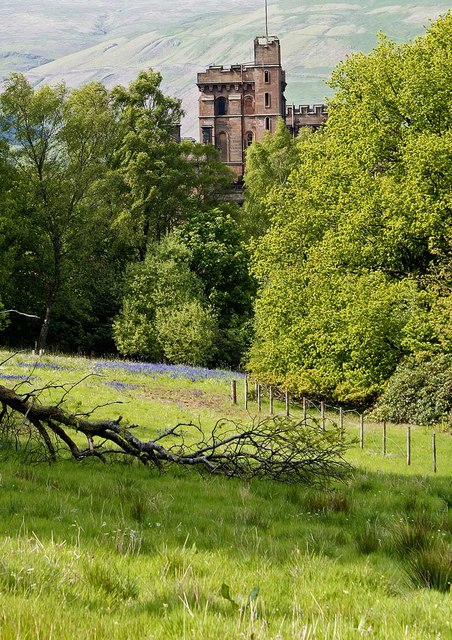
Lennox Castle (2008)

The Kincaids erected a tower or peel at the end of the thirteenth century when they obtained their lands. Nothing remains of this today, but a house was built in 1690, enlarged during the eighteenth century and rebuilt in 1812.

Kincaid House is located on the old Kincaid lands in what is now Milton of Campsie, East Dunbartonshire in the Central Lowlands. It was the ancestral home of the Kincaids of that Ilk, with the oldest part of the house dating back to 1690. The current style of the house was designed by architect David Hamilton for John Kincaid of that Ilk in 1812. His son and heir, John Lennox Kincaid Lennox, had Hamilton design and build Lennox Castle on the ancient Lennox of Woodhead estate in the Parish of Campsie, about a mile and half west of Lennoxtown, between 1837 and 1841. The family moved there and Kincaid House was sold in 1921. It was eventually converted into a hotel and remains in use as such today.

Lennox Castle was sold in 1927, and for some time after that was used as a mental hospital, as well as a maternity hospital. The last patients left the hospital in 2002, and Lennox Castle remained empty until it was severely damaged by fire on 19 May 2008. Part of the former castle grounds is now the site of Celtic Football Club's training facility (Lennoxtown Training Centre), while other parts towards Lennoxtown have become a long-term residential development to be completed in several phases, known as Campsie Village.

== Fictional Kincaids ==
- Kincade is the groundsman in the 50th anniversary James Bond film Skyfall starring Daniel Craig. Albert Finney portrays the Scottish groundkeeper of Bond's family home.
