= Sir William Hamilton, 9th Baronet =

Scottish metaphysician (1788–1856)

Sir William Hamilton Bt FRSE
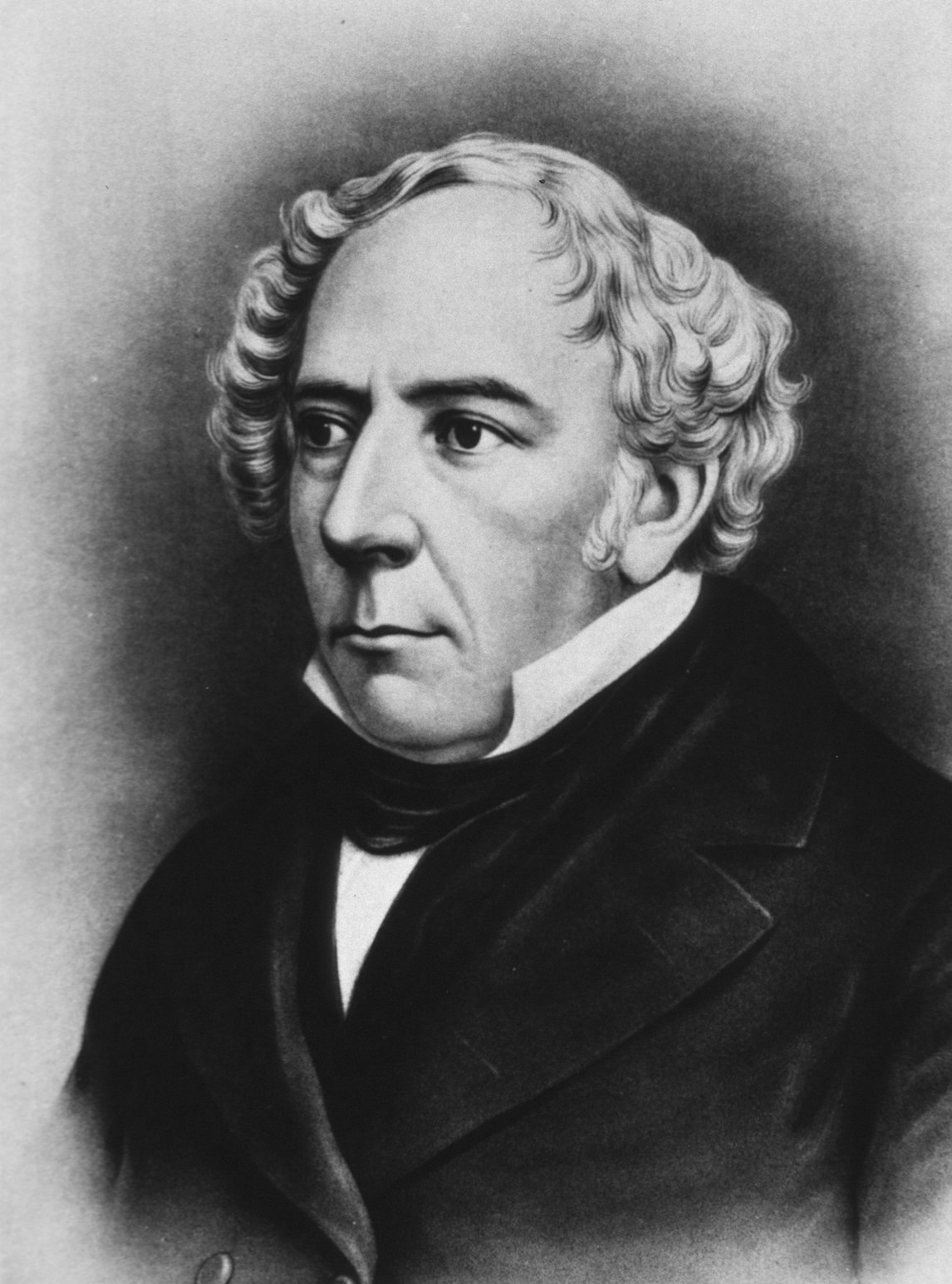
- Born: 8 March 1788; Glasgow, Scotland
- Died: 6 May 1856 (aged 68); Edinburgh, Scotland

Education
- Education: Balliol College, Oxford

Philosophical work
- Era: 19th-century philosophy
- Region: Western philosophy
- School: Scottish common sense realism
- Institutions: University of Edinburgh
- Main interests: Metaphysics, logic
- Notable ideas: Philosophy of the conditioned Quantification of the predicate

Signature
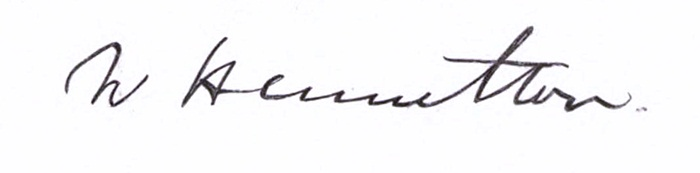

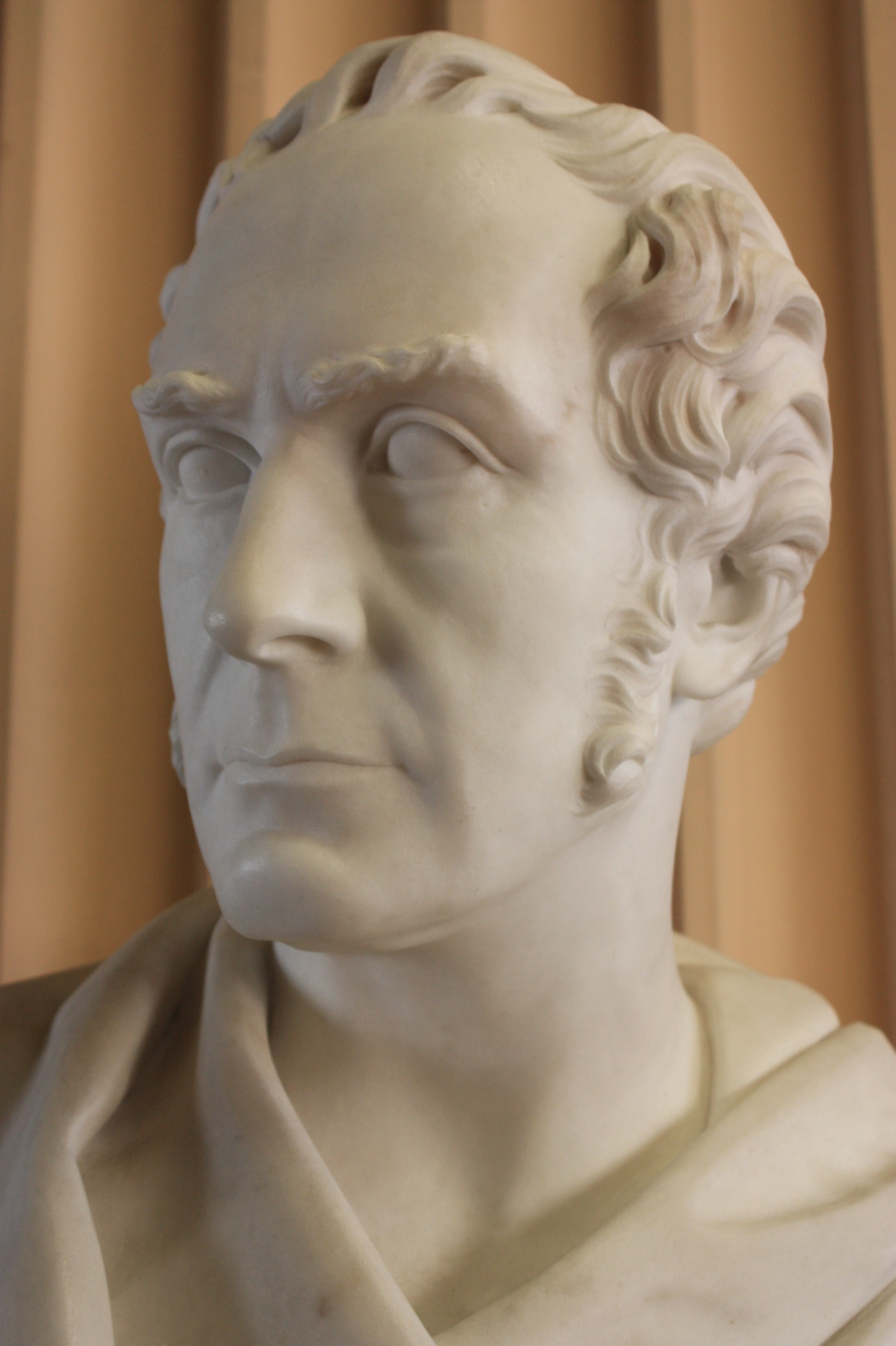
Bust of Sir William Hamilton, by William Brodie, Old College, University of Edinburgh

Sir William Hamilton, 9th Baronet (8 March 1788 – 6 May 1856) was a Scottish philosopher. He is often referred to as William Stirling-Hamilton (of Preston), in reference to his mother, Elizabeth Stirling.

== Early life ==
Hamilton was born in rooms at the University of Glasgow. He was from an academic family: his father, William Hamilton, had in 1781, on the recommendation of William Hunter, been appointed to succeed his own father, Thomas Hamilton, as Regius Professor of Anatomy, Glasgow; he died in 1790, aged 32. William Hamilton and his younger brother, Thomas Hamilton, were brought up by their mother.

Hamilton received his early education at Glasgow Grammar School, except for two years, which he spent in a private school at Chiswick in Kent, and in 1807 went as a Snell Exhibitioner to Balliol College, Oxford. He obtained a first class in literis humanioribus and took his BA in 1811 (MA 1814). He had intended to enter the medical profession, but soon after leaving Oxford, he gave up this idea, and in 1813, he became a member of the Scottish bar as a qualified advocate.

Hamilton's life continued to be that of a student while gradually forming his philosophic system. Investigation enabled him to make good his claim to represent the ancient family of Hamilton of Preston, and in 1816, he took up its baronetcy, which had been in abeyance since the death of Sir Robert Hamilton of Preston (1650–1701).

== Early time as a philosopher ==
Two visits to Germany in 1817 and 1820 led to William's taking up the study of German and, later on, contemporary German philosophy, which was almost entirely neglected in British universities. In 1820, he was a candidate for the chair of moral philosophy in the University of Edinburgh, which had fallen vacant on the death of Thomas Brown, colleague of Dugald Stewart, and Stewart's consequent resignation; however, he was defeated on political grounds by John Wilson (1785–1854), the "Christopher North" of Blackwood's Magazine. In 1821, he was appointed professor of civil history and delivered several courses of lectures on the history of modern Europe and the history of literature. The salary was £100 a year, derived from a local beer tax, and was discontinued after a time. No pupils were compelled to attend; the class dwindled, and Hamilton gave it up when the salary ceased. In January 1827, his mother, to whom he had been devoted, died. In March 1828, he married his cousin, Janet Marshall.

Around this time, he moved to live in a recently built townhouse at 11 Manor Place, in Edinburgh's west end.

== Publications ==
William Hamilton started his literary career in 1829 with the essay "Philosophy of the Unconditioned".

In 1829, his career of authorship began with the appearance of the well-known essay on the "Philosophy of the Unconditioned" (a critique of Victor Cousin's Cours de philosophie)–the first of a series of articles he contributed to the Edinburgh Review. He was elected in 1836 to the University of Edinburgh chair of logic and metaphysics, and from this time dates the influence which, during the next 20 years, he exerted over the thought of the younger generation in Scotland. Much about the same time, he began the preparation of an annotated edition of Thomas Reid's works, intending to annex a number of dissertations to it. However, before this design had been carried out, he was struck, in 1844, with paralysis of the right side which seriously crippled his bodily powers, though it left his mind unimpaired.

The edition of Reid appeared in 1846, but with only seven of the intended dissertations, one unfinished. At his death, he had still not completed the work; notes on the subjects to be discussed were found among his manuscripts. Considerably earlier, he had formed his logic theory, the leading principles indicated in the prospectus of "an essay on a new analytic of logical forms" prefixed to his edition of Reid. But the elaboration of the scheme in its details and applications continued during the next few years to occupy much of his leisure. Out of this arose a sharp controversy with Augustus De Morgan. The essay did not appear, but the results of the labour gone through are contained in the appendices to his Lectures on Logic. Hamilton also drew from the works of Wilhelm Esser in his explanation of laws in the language of agency. For instance, he cited Esser's definition of universal law to explain the sense or "quality" of "necessary".

Hamilton also prepared extensive materials for a publication, which he designed based on the personal history, influence, and opinions of Martin Luther. Here he advanced so far as to have planned and partly carried out the arrangement of the work, but it did not go further and remains in manuscript. In 1852–1853, the first and second editions of his Discussions in Philosophy, Literature and Education appeared, a reprint, with large additions, of his contributions to the Edinburgh Review. Soon after, his general health began to fail. Assisted by his devoted wife, he persevered in literary labour, and during 1854–1855, he brought out nine volumes of a new edition of Stewart's works. The only remaining volume was to have contained a memoir of Stewart, but this he did not live to write. Hamilton was elected a Foreign Honorary Member of the American Academy of Arts and Sciences in 1855. He taught his class for the last time in the winter of 1855–1856. Shortly after the close of the session, he was taken ill and died in Edinburgh.

== Death ==
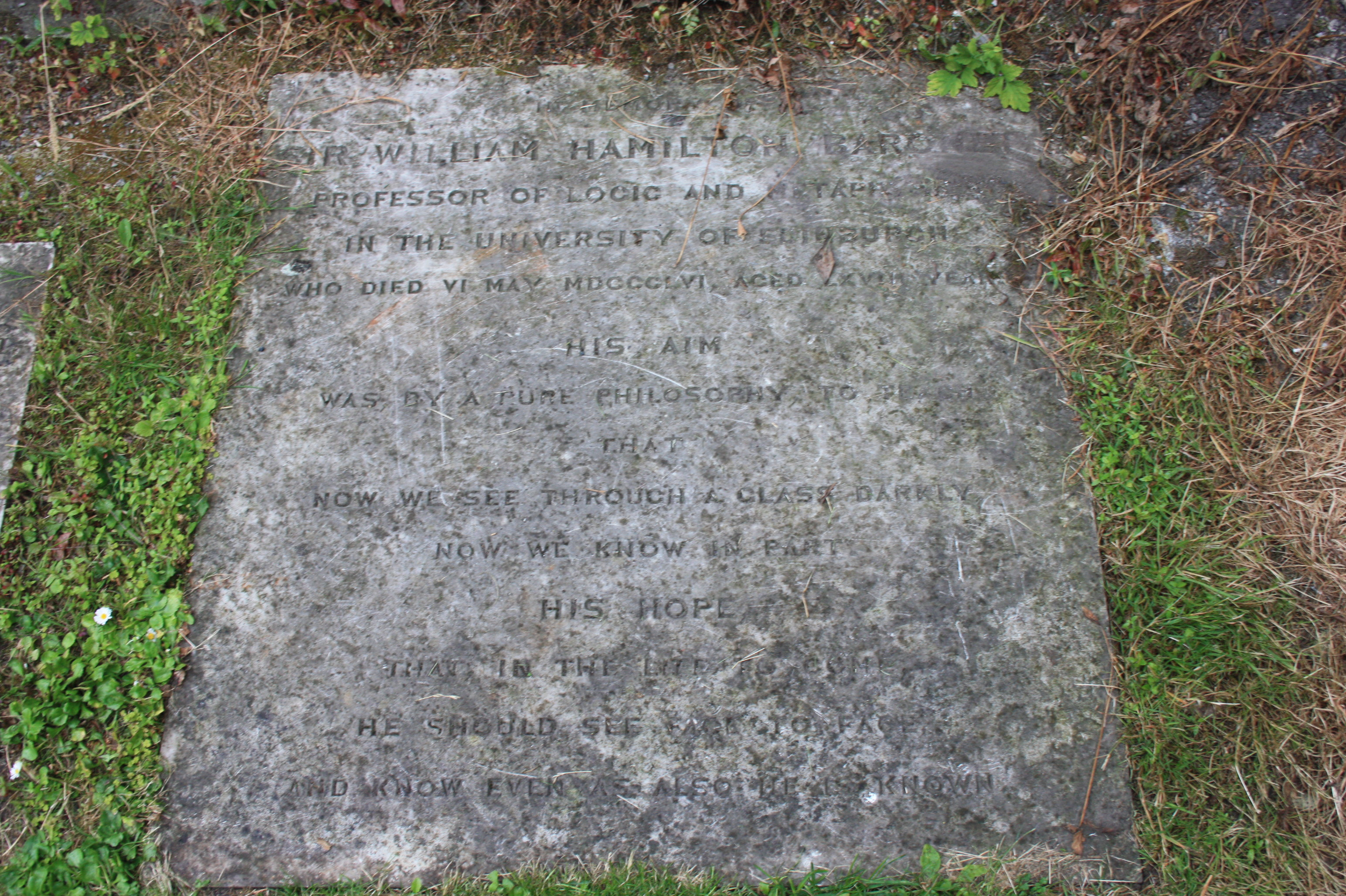
The grave of Sir William Hamilton, St John's Church, Princes Street

He died on 6 May 1856 and was buried in St John's Episcopal Churchyard at the east end of Princes Street in Edinburgh. The stone is not in its original location and is used to edge the enclosure at the east end of the church.

He had married Janet, the daughter of Hubert Marshall, and was succeeded by his son Sir William Stirling-Hamilton, 10th Baronet, a general in the British Army.

== Place in thought ==
In 1840, the University of Leyden granted him an honorary Doctor of Divinity (DD), a rarity for persons outside the clergy.

Hamilton's positive contribution to the progress of thought is comparatively slight, but he stimulated a spirit of criticism in his pupils by insisting on the great importance of psychology as opposed to the older metaphysical method, and by his recognition of the importance of German philosophy, especially that of Immanuel Kant. His most important work was "Philosophy of the Unconditioned," in which he developed his so-called "philosophy of the conditioned," the view that the human mind can know only the conditioned, not the unconditioned or infinite as such. The basis of his argument is the thesis, "To think is to condition." Deeply impressed with Kant's antithesis between subject and object, the knowing and the known, Hamilton laid down the principle that every object is known only in virtue of its relations to other objects. From this, it follows that limitless time, space, power, etc., are inconceivable. The fact, however, that all thought seems to demand the idea of the infinite or absolute provides a sphere for faith, which is thus the specific faculty of theology. It is a weakness characteristic of the human mind that it cannot conceive any phenomenon without a beginning: hence the conception of the causal relation, according to which every phenomenon has its cause in preceding phenomena, and its effect in subsequent phenomena. The causal concept is, therefore, only one of the ordinary necessary forms of the cognitive consciousness, limited, as we have seen, by being confined to that which is relative.

As regards the problem of the nature of objectivity, Hamilton accepts the evidence of consciousness as to the separate existence of the object: "the root of our nature cannot be a lie." Due to this assumption, Hamilton's philosophy becomes a "natural realism." In fact, his whole position is a strange compound of Kant and Reid. Its chief practical corollary is the denial of philosophy as a method of attaining absolute knowledge and its relegation to the academic sphere of mental training. Hamilton presents the transition from philosophy to theology, i.e., to the sphere of faith, under the analogous relation between the mind and the body. As the mind is to the body, so is the unconditioned Absolute or God to the world of the conditioned. Consciousness, itself a conditioned phenomenon, must derive from or depend on some different thing before or behind material phenomena. Hamilton does not explain how it comes about that God, who in the terms of the analogy bears to the conditioned mind the relation which the conditioned mind bears to its objects, can be unconditioned. God can be regarded only as related to consciousness, and insofar as it is, therefore, not absolute or unconditioned. Thus, the very principles of Hamilton's philosophy are apparently violated in his theological argument.

Hamilton regarded logic as a purely formal science; it seemed to him an unscientific mixing of heterogeneous elements to treat as parts of the same science the formal and the material conditions of knowledge. He was quite ready to allow that on this view logic cannot be used as a means of discovering or guaranteeing facts, even the most general, and expressly asserted that it has to do, not with the objective validity, but only with the mutual relations, of judgments. He further held that induction and deduction are correlative processes of formal logic, each resting on the necessities of thought and deriving thence its several laws. The only logical laws he recognised were the three axioms of identity, noncontradiction, and excluded middle, which he regarded as several phases of one general condition of the possibility of existence and, therefore, of thought. He considered the law of reason and consequence not as different, but merely as expressing metaphysically what these express logically. He added as a postulate—which in his theory was of importance--"that logic be allowed to state explicitly what is thought implicitly." in logic, Hamilton is known chiefly as the inventor of the doctrine of the "quantification of the predicate," i.e. that the judgment "All A is B " should really mean "All A is all B," whereas the ordinary universal proposition should be stated "All A is some B." This view, which Stanley Jevons supported, is fundamentally at fault since it implies that the predicate is thought of in its extension; in point of fact when a judgment is made, e.g., about men, that they are mortal ("All men are mortal"), the intention is to attribute a quality (i.e. the predicate is used in connotation). In other words, we are not considering the question "What kind are men among the various things which must die?" (as implied in the form "all men are some mortals") but "what is the fact about men?" We are not stating a mere identity (see further, e.g., H. W. B. Joseph, Introduction to Logic, 1906, pp. 198ff.).

The philosopher to whom, above all others, Hamilton professed allegiance was Aristotle. His works were the object of his profound and constant study and supplied the mould in which his philosophy was cast. With the commentators on the Aristotelian writings, ancient, medieval, and modern, he was also familiar with the scholastic philosophy he studied with care and appreciation at a time when it had hardly yet begun to attract attention in his country. His wide reading enabled him to trace many a doctrine to the writings of forgotten thinkers, and nothing gave him greater pleasure than to draw forth such from their obscurity and to give due acknowledgment, even if it chanced to be of the prior possession of a view or argument that he had thought out for himself. He was a diligent, if not always a sympathetic, student of modern German philosophy. How profoundly Kant modified his thinking is evident from the tenor of his speculations; nor was this less the case because, on fundamental points, he came to widely different conclusions.

Hamilton was more than a philosopher; his knowledge and interests embraced all subjects related to the human mind. He studied anatomy and physiology. He was also well-read in ancient and modern literature, particularly interested in the 16th and 17th centuries. Among his literary projects were editions of the works of George Buchanan and Julius Caesar Scaliger. His general scholarship found expression in his library, which became part of the library of the University of Glasgow.

He also may have influenced subsequent philosophy as the inspiration for a critique by John Stuart Mill, who wrote An Examination of Sir William Hamilton’s Philosophy (1865), which resulted in perhaps the clearest statements ever of the idea of matter as the permanent possibility of sensation.

== Education ==
His chief practical interest was in education, an interest which he manifested as a teacher and writer, and which had led him long before he was either to study the subject, both theoretical and historical. He thence adopted views on the ends and methods of education that, when afterwards carried out or advocated by him, met with general recognition. Still, in one of his articles, he also expressed an unfavourable view of the study of mathematics as a mental gymnastic, which excited much opposition but which he never saw reason to alter. As a teacher, he was zealous and successful, and his writings on university organisation and reform had a decisive practical effect at the time of their appearance, and contain much that is of permanent value.

== Last works ==
His posthumous works are his Lectures on Metaphysics and Logic (1860), 4 vols., edited by H. L. Mansel, Oxford, and John Veitch (Metaphysics; Logic); and Additional Notes to Reid's Works, from Sir W. Hamilton's Manuscripts., under the editorship of H. L. Mansel, D.D. (1862). A Memoir of Sir W. Hamilton, by Veitch, appeared in 1869.

== Sources ==
Baronetage of Nova Scotia
Preceded by Robert Hamilton	Baronet (of Preston); 1799–1856	Succeeded by William Stirling-Hamilton
