= William Stirling (British Army officer, born 1835) =

British Army general (1835–1906)

General Sir William Stirling KCB
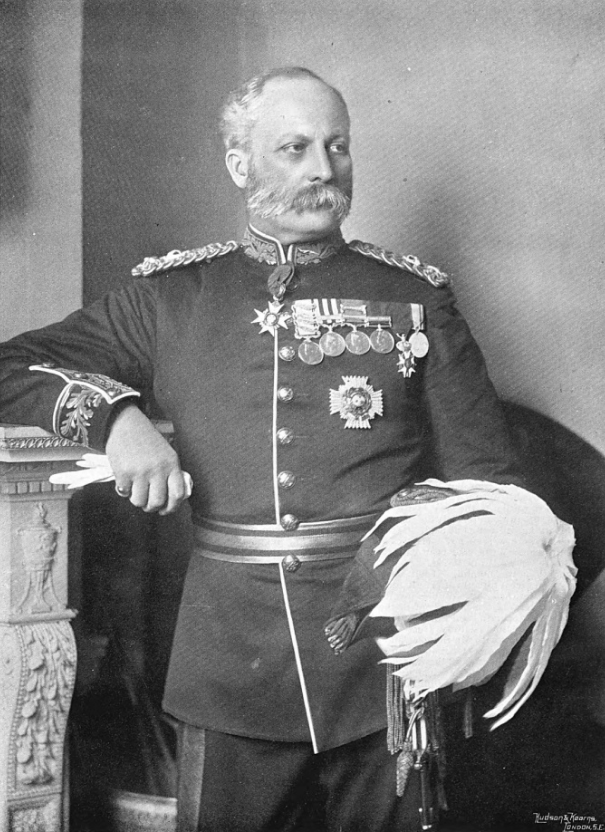
- Stirling c.1898
- Born: 4 August 1835; Muiravonside
- Died: 11 April 1906 (aged 70); Ochiltree
- Burial place: Cheriton Road Cemetery, Folkstone
- Military career
- Branch: British Army
- Rank: General
- Unit: Royal Artillery
- Conflicts: Crimean War; Second Opium War; Second Anglo-Afghan War
- Awards: Knight Commander of the Order of the Bath

General Sir William Stirling KCB (4 August 1835 – 11 April 1906) was a British Army officer who served as Governor of the Royal Military Academy, Woolwich and Lieutenant of the Tower of London.

== Military career ==
Stirling was born in 1835 to Charles Stirling (1789–1867), a wealthy cotton merchant, and his wife Charlotte Dorothea Stirling (1800-1862). His parents were first cousins, being both grandchildren of Captain Sir Walter Stirling. They were also more distantly related through their shared patrilineal descent from John Stirling (1640-1709), a Merchant Burgess of Glasgow, whose descendants were prominent in business and in the Navy: his father was a younger brother of Admiral Sir James Stirling, while his mother was a daughter of Vice-Admiral Charles Stirling.

His father had bought an estate at Muiravonside and he had twelve children including William who was the third son.

Educated at Edinburgh Academy and the Royal Military Academy, Woolwich, Stirling was commissioned into the Royal Artillery and saw action at the Battle of Alma, at the Battle of Balaclava and at the Battle of Inkerman as well as the Siege of Sevastopol during the Crimean War. He took part in the expedition to China during the Second Opium War in 1860, and saw action again during the Second Anglo-Afghan War in 1878. Stirling became assistant adjutant and quartermaster general, Woolwich District in 1880, Commander Royal Artillery for Southern District in 1885 and Governor of the Royal Military Academy, Woolwich in 1890. In 1893 he was made a Knight Commander of the Order of the Bath in the 1893 Birthday Honours list. He went on to be Lieutenant of the Tower of London in 1900 and was promoted to full general on 5 January 1902, shortly before his retirement in August that year.

The grounds of Stirling's childhood home at Muiravonside near Falkirk are in public ownership and are open as Muiravonside Country Park.
