= Pueblo Historical Aircraft Society =

Military aircraft collection in Colorado

The Pueblo Historical Aircraft Society (PHAS), Pueblo, Colorado hosts a large collection of military aircraft in Colorado, United States through the operation of the Weisbrod Museum and the International B-24 Memorial Museum, together as the Pueblo Weisbrod Aircraft Museum.

The Society is a volunteer group of ex-military and civilian personnel who manage and operate the aircraft display as well as repairing and restoring the aircraft. The Society is open to all who wish to help preserve the aviation history in Pueblo County and Pueblo, Colorado.

== See also ==
- CAF Rocky Mountain Wing Museum, Grand Junction, CO
- Colorado Aviation Historical Society, Denver, CO
- Peterson Air and Space Museum, Colorado Springs, CO
- Pueblo Weisbrod Aircraft Museum (combined Weisbrod and B-24 International Museums), Pueblo, CO
- Spirit of Flight Center, Lafayette, CO
- Vintage Aero Flying Museum, Hudson, CO
- Wings Over the Rockies Air and Space Museum, Denver, CO
- List of aviation historical societies
