= List of surviving Grumman TBF Avengers =

== Surviving aircraft ==
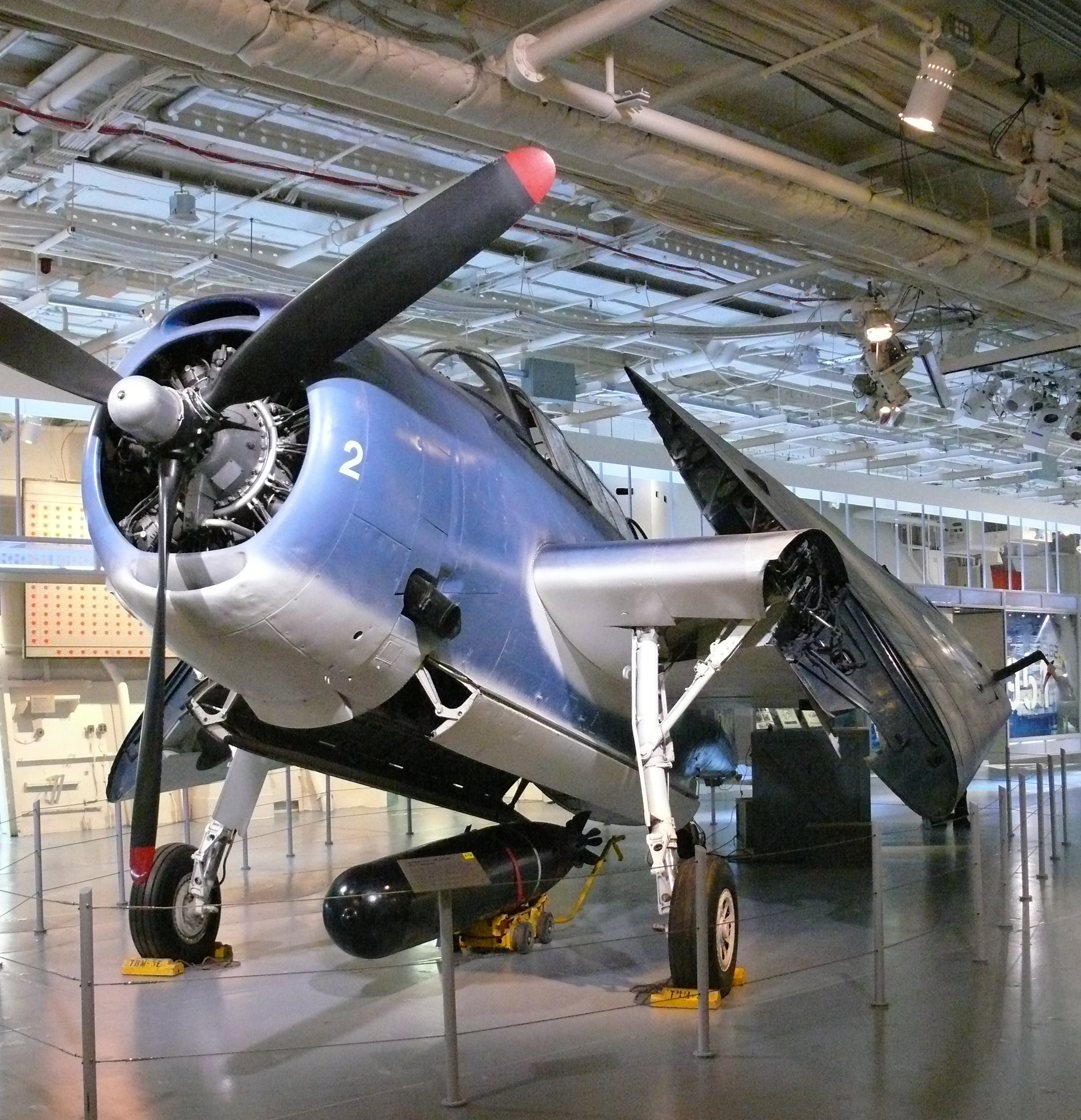
An Avenger in the Intrepid Sea-Air-Space Museum

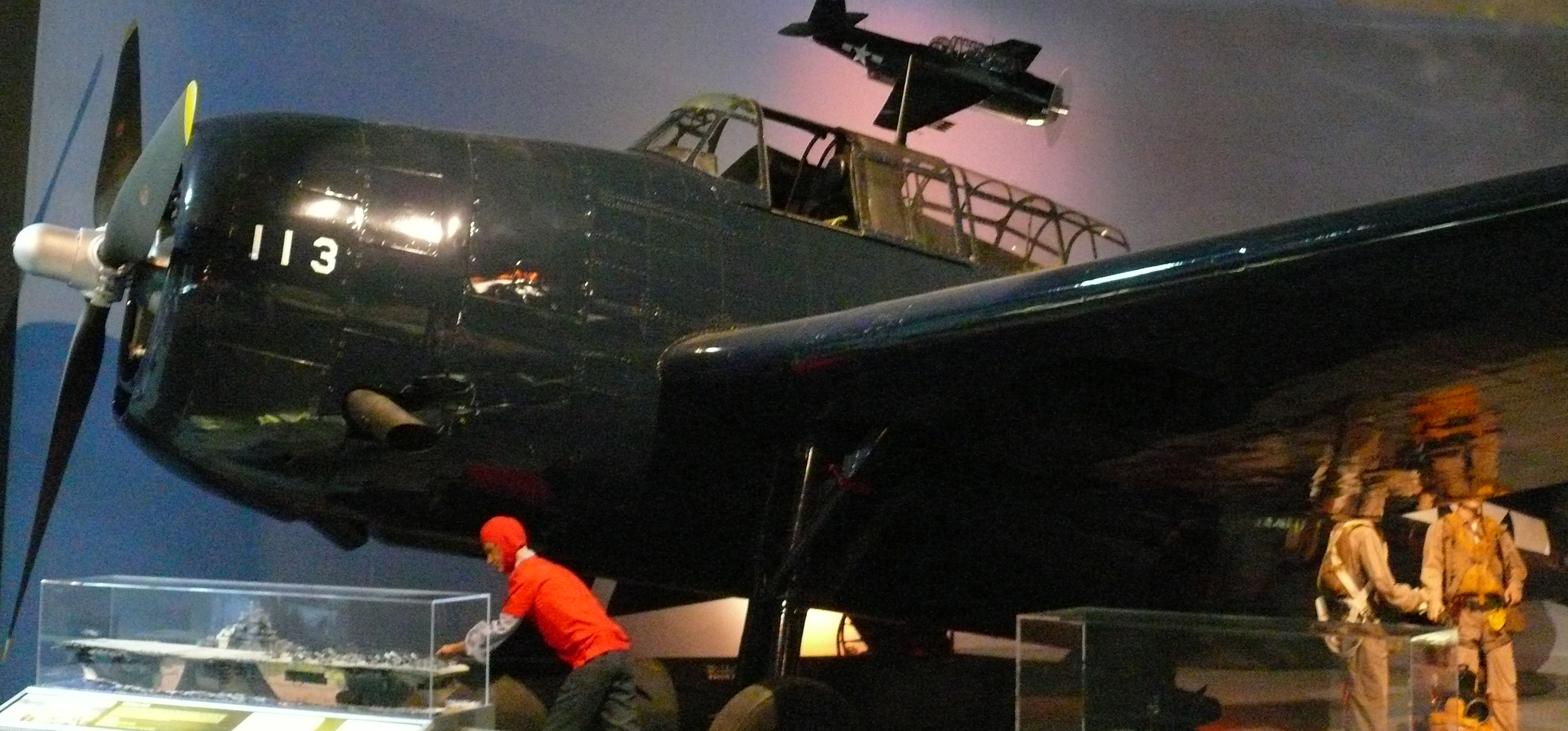
An Avenger in the Cradle of Aviation Museum

=== Australia ===
Airworthy

TBM-3

- 53857 - Bennet Aviation Pty Limited in Redhead, New South Wales.

=== Canada ===
Airworthy

TBM-3

- 53610 - Shearwater Aviation Museum in Dartmouth, Nova Scotia.
- 53858 - Canadian Warplane Heritage Museum in Hamilton, Ontario.
- 69361 - Reynolds-Alberta Museum in Wetaskiwin, Alberta.

On display

TBM-3

- 53607 - Atlantic Canada Aviation Museum in Halifax, Nova Scotia.
- 85733 - Central New Brunswick Woodsmen's Museum in Boiestown, New Brunswick.
- 85861 - Shearwater Aviation Museum in Dartmouth, Nova Scotia.

In storage

TBM-3

- 91171 - James Wilson in British Columbia.

=== France ===
Airworthy

TBM-3

- 85869 - AMPAA in Etampes.

=== Israel ===
On display

TBM-3

- 69355 - Israeli Air Force Museum.

Under restoration

TBM-3

- 85506 - under restoration by Ben Ami in Tel Aviv.

=== New Zealand ===
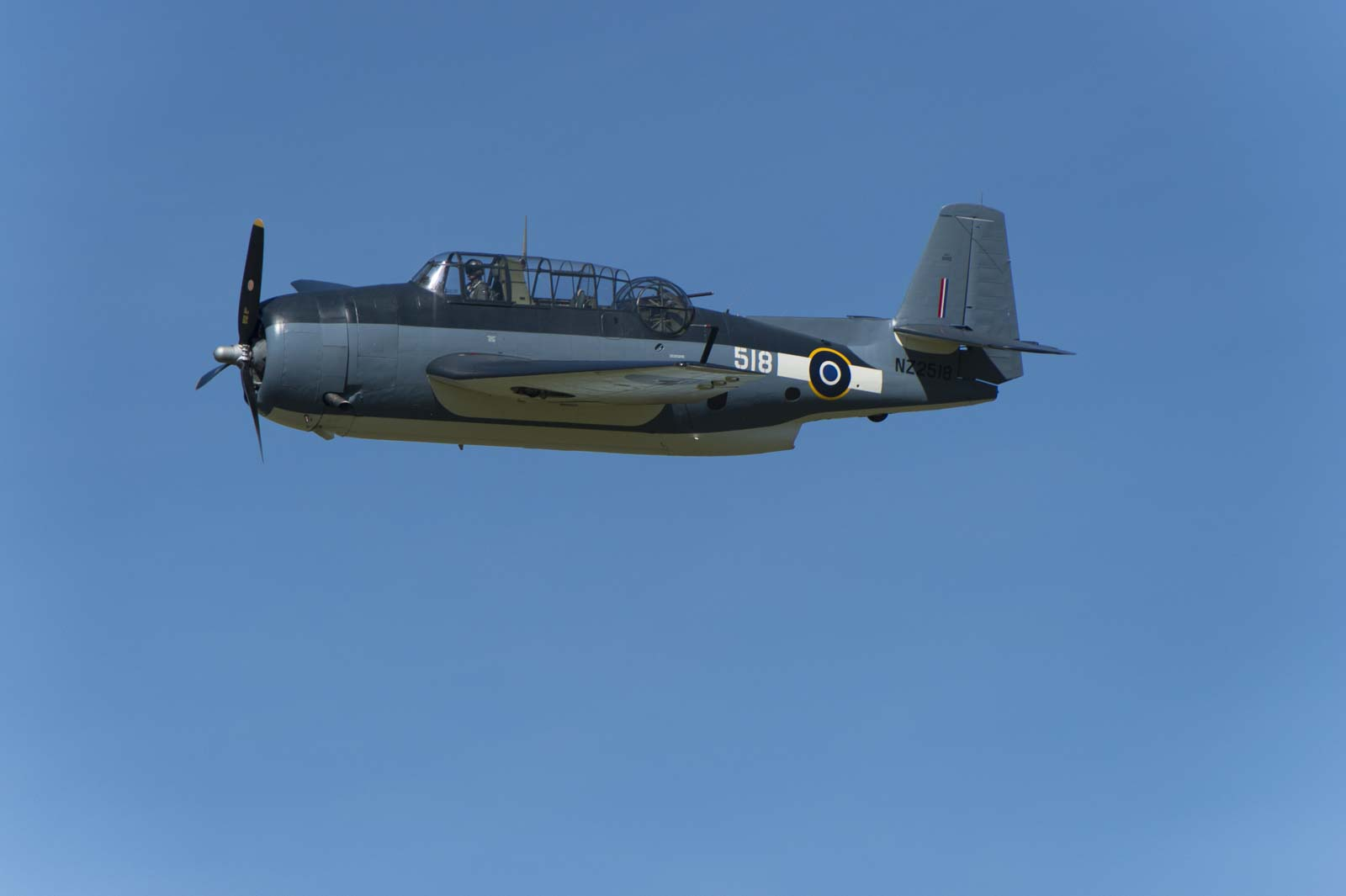
TBM-3 NZ2518

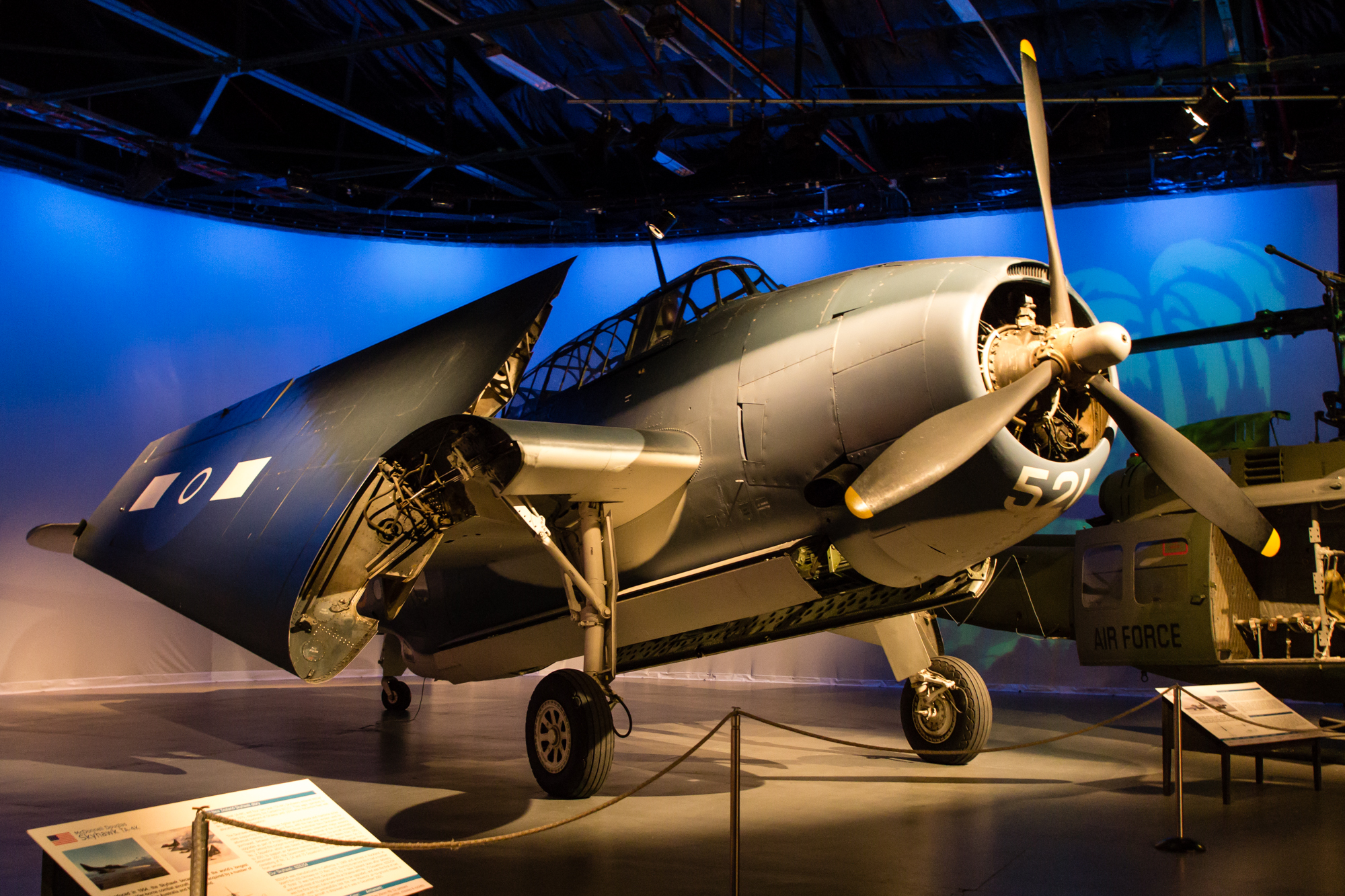
TBF-1 NZ2504

Airworthy

TBM-3

- 91110 - Brendon Deere, based at RNZAF Base Ohakea, painted as NZ2518 "Plonky" (build number 47733).

On display

TBF-1

- 24336 - RNZAF serial NZ2504, RNZAF Museum in Wigram, New Zealand, painted in its original colours as RNZAF serial NZ2504.
- 24337 - RNZAF serial NZ2505, Classic Flyers, Mount Maunganui, on loan from Gisborne Aviation Preservation Society in Gisborne, New Zealand.
- 47859 - RNZAF serial NZ2527, Museum of Transport and Technology, Western Springs, Auckland.

Under restoration

TBF-1

- 48016 - RNZAF serial NZ2539, being restored by Classic Flyers, Mount Maunganui.

=== United Kingdom ===
On display

TBM-3

- 69327 - This aircraft is planned to be displayed at the Battle of the Atlantic Story, a museum in Birkenhead that will also display the German submarine U-534.
- XB446 - Fleet Air Arm Museum in Yeovilton.

=== United States ===
Airworthy

TBM-3

- 69325 - privately owned in Camden, Tennessee.
- 69329 - privately owned in Wilmington, Delaware.
- 69459 - based at the War Eagles Air Museum in Santa Teresa, New Mexico.

TBM-3E

- 53119 - privately owned in Orange, California.
- 53139 - based at the National Museum of World War II Aviation in Colorado Springs, Colorado.
- 53353 - based at the Commemorative Air Force (Missouri Wing) in Portage Des Sioux, Missouri.
- 53420 - based at the Tri-State Warbird Museum in Batavia, Ohio.
- 53454 - based at the Military Aviation Museum in Virginia Beach, Virginia.
- 53503 - based at the CAF Rocky Mountain Wing Museum in Grand Junction, Colorado.
- 53575 - based at the Lone Star Flight Museum in Houston, Texas.
- 53638 - based at the Mid-Atlantic Air Museum in Reading, Pennsylvania.
- 53768 - privately owned in Joliet, Illinois.
- 53785 - based at the Palm Springs Air Museum in Palm Springs, California.
- 53787 - based at the Catcus Air Force Wings and Wheels Museum in Carson City, Nevada.
- 53818 - privately owned in Bloomington, Minnesota.
- 53829 - privately owned in West Fargo, North Dakota.
- 53835 - privately owned in Greenwich, Connecticut.

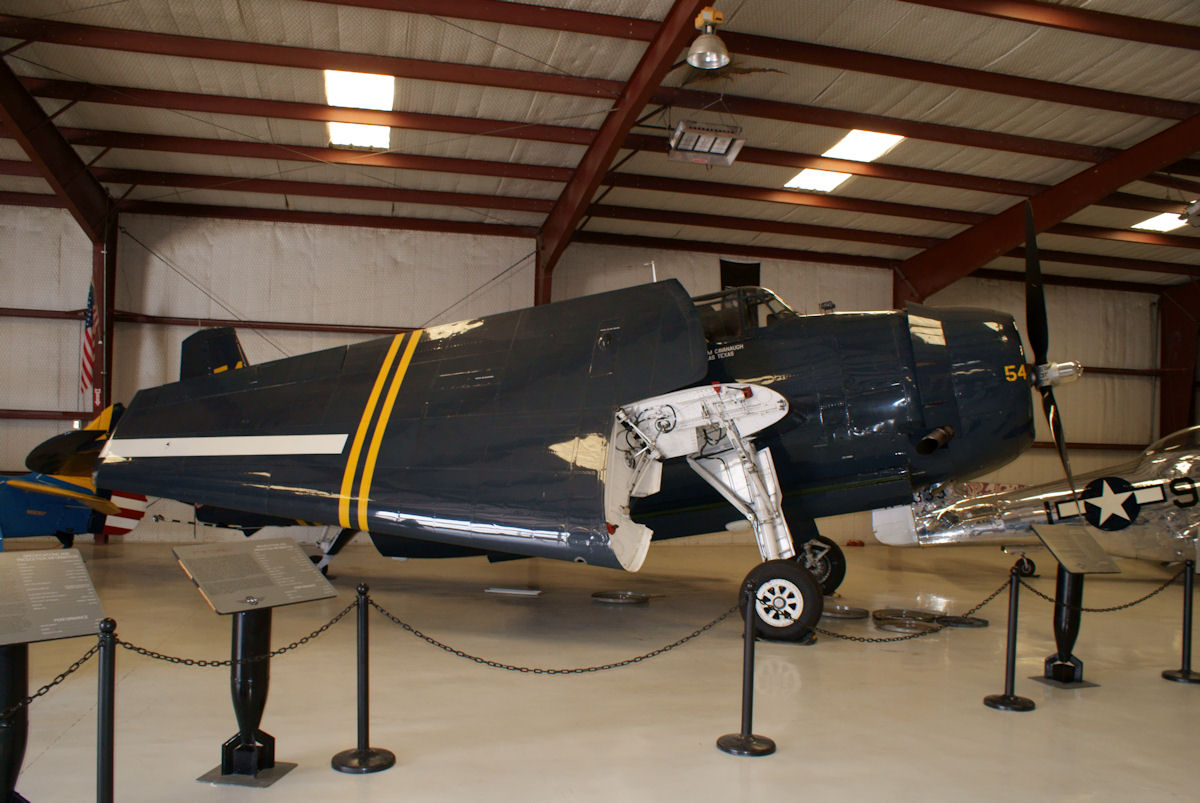
TBM-3E at the Cavanaugh Flight Museum

- 85460 - based at the NAS Wildwood Aviation Museum in Cape May County, New Jersey.
- 85632 - privately owned in Peru, Illinois.
- 85650 - privately owned in Pawcatuck, Connecticut.
- 85794 - based at the Lauridsen Aviation Museum in Buckeye, Arizona.
- 85849 - Erickson Aircraft Collection in Beaverton, Oregon.
- 85882 - privately owned in Latham, New York.
- 85886 - based at the American Airpower Museum in Farmingdale, New York.
- 85938 - based at the Mid America Flight Museum in Mount Pleasant, Texas.
- 85983 - privately owned in Wilmington, Delaware.
- 86180 - based at the NAS Wildwood Aviation Museum in Cape May County, New Jersey.
- 86280 - based at the Cavanaugh Flight Museum in Addison, Texas. Removed from public display when the museum indefinitely closed on 1 January 2024. To be moved to North Texas Regional Airport in Denison, Texas.
- 91264 - based at the Planes of Fame in Chino, California.
- 91388 - privately owned in Danbury, Connecticut.
- 91426 - based at the Commemorative Air Force (Capital Wing) in Brandy Station, Virginia.
- 91436 - based at the Liberty Aviation Museum in Port Clinton, Ohio.
- 91453 - privately owned in Fort Valley, Virginia.
- 91521 - privately owned in Huntington, Indiana.
- 91726 - privately owned in Jackson, Mississippi.
- 91733 - based at the Collings Foundation in Stow, Massachusetts.

On display

TBM-3

- 69374 - National World War II Museum in New Orleans, LA and was restored by Rolando X Gutierrez, Flyboys Aeroworks, LLC in San Diego, California.
- 69375 - USS Hornet (CV-12) museum in Alameda, California.
- 69472 - Pima Air & Space Museum in Tucson, Arizona.

TBM-3E

- 53200 - Museum of Mountain Flying at the Missoula International Airport in Missoula, Montana.
- 53229 - George Bush Presidential Library in College Station, Texas.
- 53403 - National Museum of the Pacific War at the Pacific Combat Zone in Fredericksburg, Texas. It is on loan from the National Museum of Naval Aviation in Pensacola, Florida.
- 53593 - National Naval Aviation Museum at Naval Air Station Pensacola, Florida.
- 53804 - USS Lexington (CV-16) museum in Corpus Christi, Texas.
- 53842 - USS Yorktown (CV-10) at the Patriot's Point Naval and Maritime Museum in Charleston, South Carolina.
- 53726 - Flying Leatherneck Aviation Museum in Miramar, California.
- 85890 - National Museum of the Marine Corps in Triangle, Virginia.
- 85957 - USS Midway Museum in San Diego, California. It is on loan from Sidney Summers in San Diego, California.
- 86123 - Mid-America Air Museum in Liberal, Kansas.
- 91586 - Cradle of Aviation Museum, Garden City, Long Island, New York. It is on loan from the Friends For Long Island's Heritage in Huntington, New York, sponsored by Mrs. William T. Schwendler.
- 91664 - NAS Jacksonville in Jacksonville, Florida.
- 91752 - Wings of Eagles Discovery Center in Horseheads, New York.

Under restoration or in storage

TBF-1

- 01741 - for static display at the DeLand Naval Air Station Museum at the former Naval Air Station DeLand (now the DeLand Municipal Airport) in DeLand, Florida.
- 05997 - for static display at the Yanks Air Museum in Chino, California.
- 24085 - in storage at the Paul Garber Facility of the National Air and Space Museum in Silver Hill, Maryland.

TBM-3E

- 53914 - for static display at Commemorative Air Force (Airbase Arizona) in Mesa, Arizona.
- 85597 - to airworthiness at Fagen Fighters WWII Museum in Granite Falls, Minnesota.
- 85715 - in storage by private owner in Holts Summit, Missouri.
- 91598 - in storage at the Fantasy of Flight in Polk City, Florida.

TBM-3U

- 91188 - based at the Valiant Air Command Warbird Museum in Titusville, Florida. Damaged after a shallow water ditching in Florida during Warbirds on Parade display.
