= Peterson Air and Space Museum =

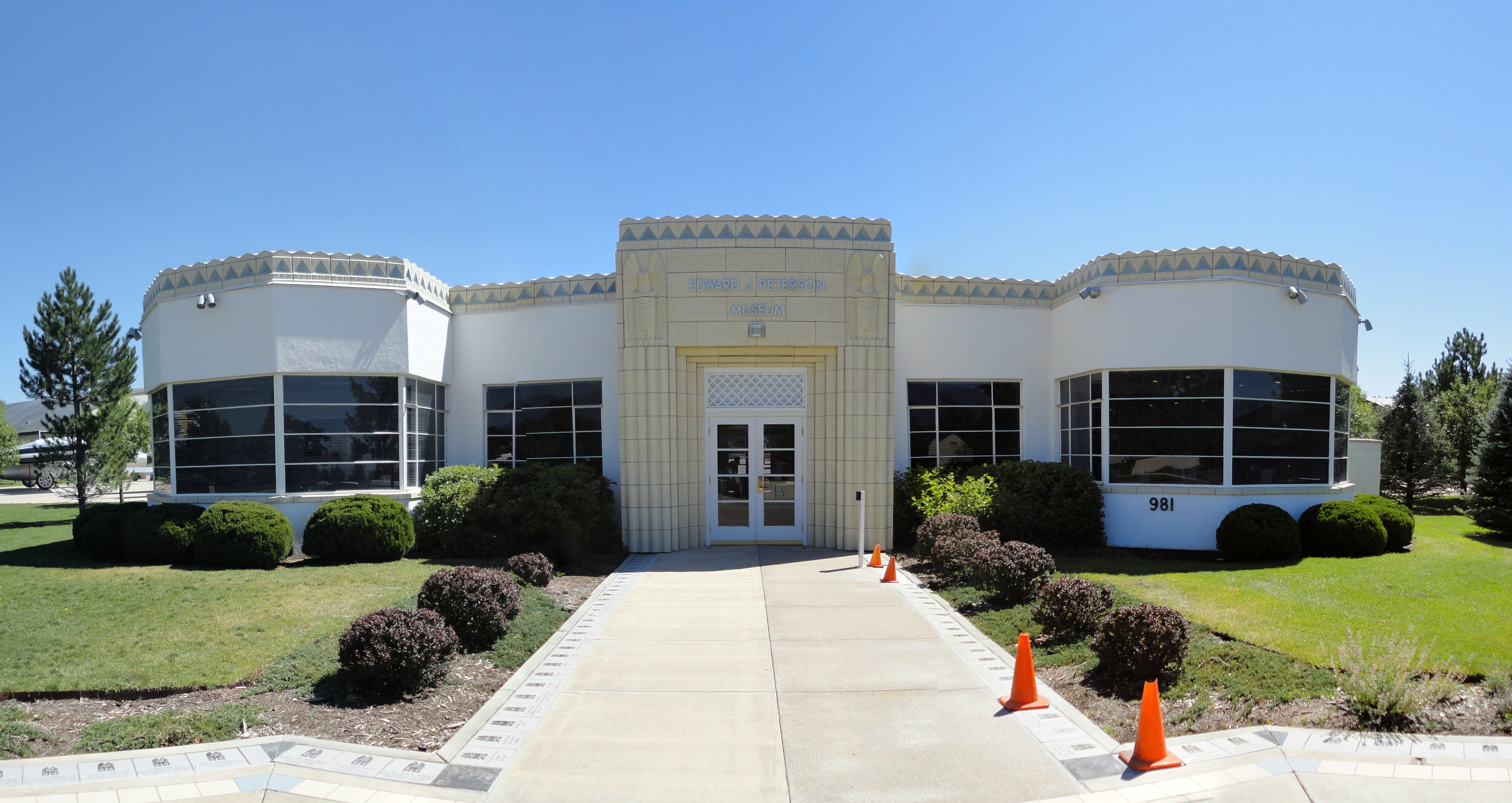
- Terminal building

- Location within Colorado
- Established: 1982
- Location: Peterson Space Force Base, Colorado Springs, Colorado
- Type: Military aerospace museum
- Website: petemuseum.org
- Colorado Springs Airport
- U.S. National Register of Historic Places
- U.S. Historic district
- Coordinates: 38°49′22″N 104°42′07″W
- Area: 8.3 acres (3.4 ha)
- Built: 1942
- Architectural style: Art Deco, Moderne
- NRHP reference No.: 90001296
- Added to NRHP: November 15, 1996

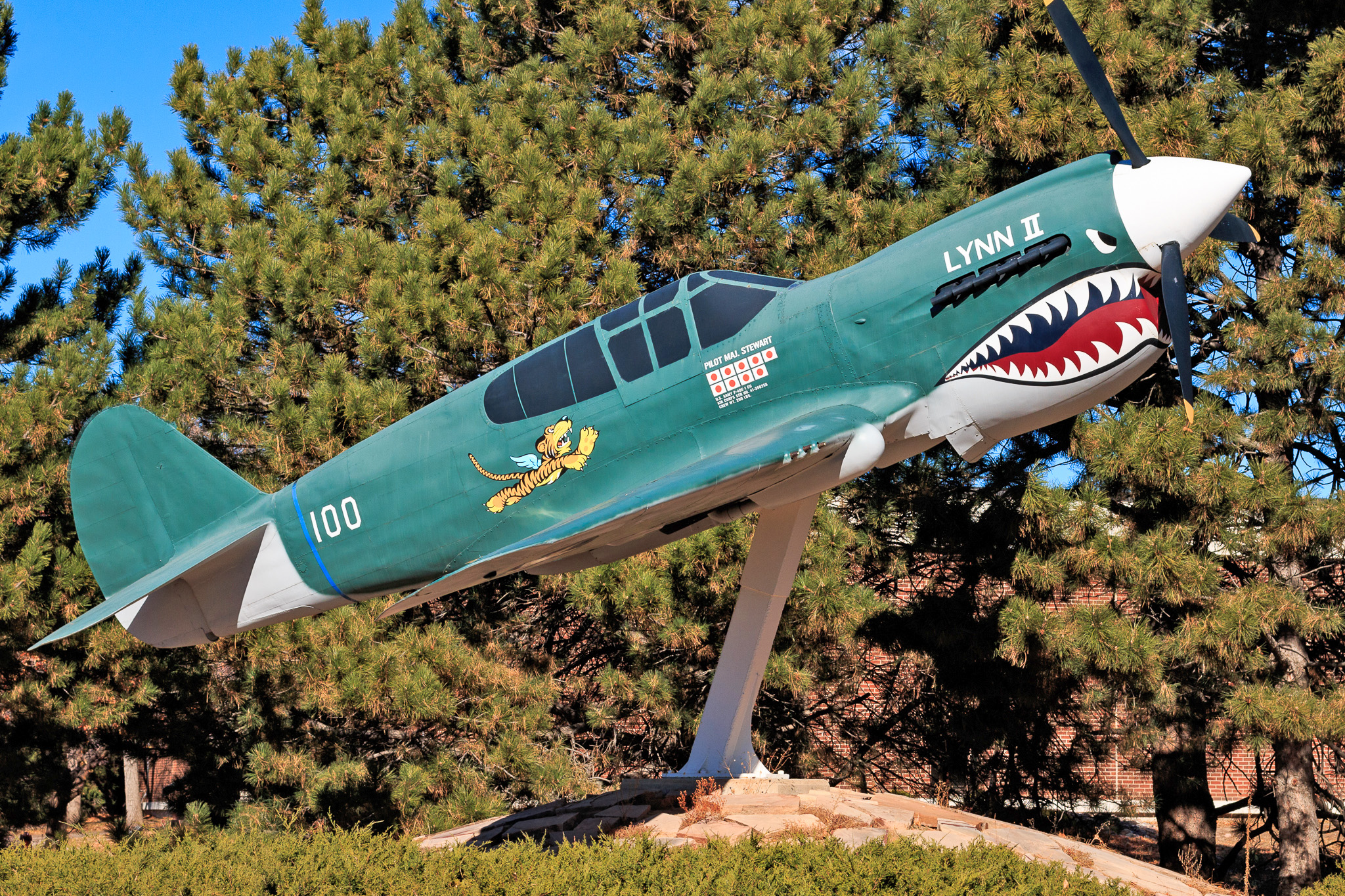
P-40 Replica outside the entrance to the museum

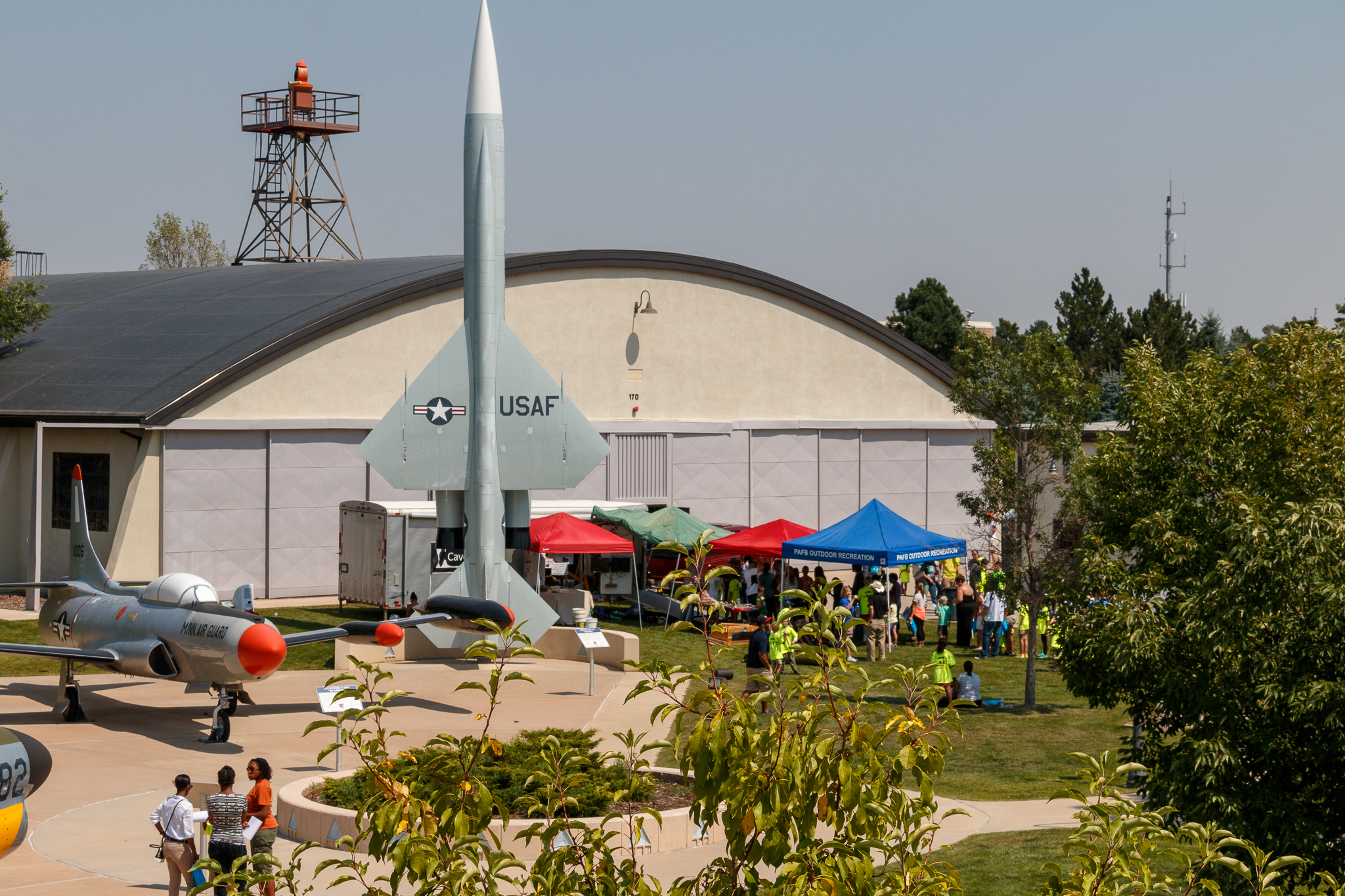
The PASM Air Park area by the City Hangar during the Science, Technology, Engineering, and Math (STEM) August 2015

Peterson Air and Space Museum is an aviation museum located at Peterson Space Force Base, Colorado Springs, Colorado focused on the history of the Air Defense Command, Aerospace Defense Command and Air Force Space Command.

== History ==
The museum grew from the North American Aerospace Defense Command Visitor Center established by Col. Donald Parson in 1975.

== Exhibits ==
The main entrance of the museum is through the original terminal building for the Colorado Springs Airport, built in 1941 for the Colorado Springs Municipal Airport. This building houses a small number of exhibits mainly focusing on the base's World War II history as a training ground for the 14th Photographic Reconnaissance Squadron, including a tribute to 1st Lt. Edward J. Peterson, for whom the base was named after a fatal crash. The building also houses an introductory screening room and museum store.

The rear exit of the building leads to the Air Park, where the majority of the museum's aircraft are on display. Of these, the EC-121 Warning Star is the only one open for tours. Nearby is a Medal of Honor memorial. There are two hangars also in the courtyard that have been converted into museum buildings. One was formerly used by the Broadmoor hotel for aircraft storage and transportation of clientele, and is now used as an archival and administrative building for museum personnel; this building is not open to the public, but a proposal has been put forward to convert it into more exhibit space. The other was used for public transportation by the original municipal airport and currently houses the majority of exhibits on the museum grounds. These exhibits include:

- Displays on the air warning mission of the Air Defense Command during the Cold War: Semi-Automatic Ground Environment
- Displays on the missile warning mission of NORAD during the Cold War: Ballistic Missile Early Warning System
- Decommissioned computer equipment from the Cheyenne Mountain Complex
- A Peacekeeper payload shroud
- A Mk. 21 re-entry vehicle for a thermonuclear weapon
- A training simulator for a Peacekeeper missile launch control center
- An exhibit related to the 460th Space Wing, featuring a Vela satellite and a mock-up of a Defense Support Program satellite.
- Space Control displays including interactive kiosks on the role of the space and missile warning missions of Air Force Space Command
- Nuclear Hotline Telephone Dating to the Cold War which started the NORAD Tracks Santa Program.

== Aircraft on display ==
- Avro CF-100 Canuck 100779
- Convair F-102A Delta Dagger 56-1109
- Convair F-106A Delta Dart 59-0134
- Curtiss P-40E Warhawk – replica
- Lockheed EC-121T Warning Star 52-3425
- Lockheed F-94C Starfire 50-1006
- Lockheed F-104C Starfighter 56-0936
- Lockheed T-33A 57-0713
- Martin EB-57E Canberra 55-4279
- McDonnell CF-101B Voodoo 101044
- McDonnell F-101B Voodoo 58-0274
- McDonnell F-4C Phantom II 64-0799
- McDonnell Douglas CF-188 Hornet 188723
- McDonnell Douglas F-15A Eagle 76-0024
- North American F-86L Sabre 53-0782
- Northrop F-89J Scorpion 52-1941
- Republic P-47N Thunderbolt 44-89425

== Other items on display ==
- CIM-10 Bomarc supersonic ramjet missile
- AIR-2 Genie nuclear air-to-air rocket

== See also ==
- CAF Rocky Mountain Wing Museum, Grand Junction, CO
- Colorado Aviation Historical Society, Denver, CO
- Pueblo Historical Aircraft Society, Pueblo, CO
- Pueblo Weisbrod Aircraft Museum, Pueblo, CO
- Spirit of Flight Center, Lafayette, CO
- Vintage Aero Flying Museum, Platte Valley Airpark Hudson, CO
- Wings Over the Rockies Air and Space Museum, Denver, CO

Related lists

- National Register of Historic Places listings in El Paso County, Colorado
- List of aerospace museums
