= Vintage Aero Flying Museum =

Aviation museum in Colorado, United States

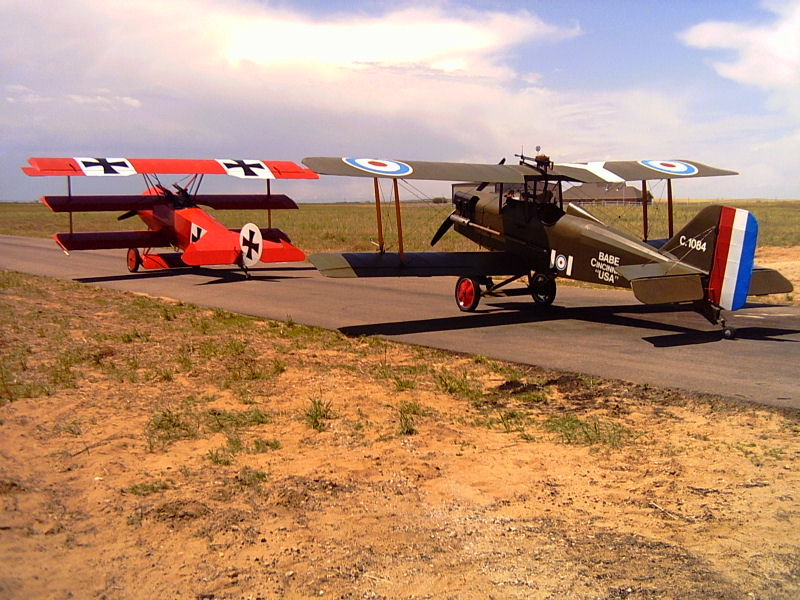
- VAFM's Fokker Dr.1 and SE.5 taxiing at Platte Valley Airpark
- Established: 1997
- Location: Platte Valley Airpark; Fort Lupton, Colorado
- Coordinates: 40°06′09″N 104°41′52″W
- Type: Aviation
- Director: Andy Parks (owner)
- Curator: Andy Parks
- Website: Vintage Aero Flying Museum

Vintage Aero Flying Museum (VAFM), formally LaFayette Escadrille Flying Museum, is Colorado's international aviation museum at Platte Valley Airpark, 4 miles (6.4 km) northwest of Hudson, Colorado and 40 miles (64 km) northeast of Denver, Colorado.

Andy Parks, son of the last World War I Lafayette Escadrille member who 'flew west', James Parks (Note: In 1983 during this late L.E. reunion that the surviving members of the Corps made Dr. James Parks an Honorary Member #9 of the Corp.), maintains the legacy and history of the LaFayette Escadrille pilots. The collection of each of these pilots' original uniforms and memorabilia is on display in custom cabinets in a secured hangar of World War I aircraft. There is no other collection of this magnitude in the world today. The Parks have created a museum in a rural setting, much like a French rural World War I air field.

VAFM is a 501(c)(3) non-profit organization and its foundation was created by James Parks in 1984 as a historical and educational foundation.

== Flying aircraft on display ==
- 1917 Fokker Dr.I (replica)
- 1918 Fokker D.VII
- 1918 Fokker D.VIII
- 1917 Sopwith Pup
- 1917 SE5a
- 1939 Vultee BT-13 Valiant
- Mullicoupe by Younkin/Dake (Mulicoupe is a combination of a Monocoupe 90 and a MrMulligan)

== See also ==
Museums

- CAF Rocky Mountain Wing Museum, Grand Junction, CO
- Colorado Aviation Historical Society Old Lowry AFB Campus, Denver, CO
- Peterson Air and Space Museum Peterson AFB, Colorado Springs, CO
- Pueblo Historical Aircraft Society Pueblo Airport, Pueblo, CO
- Pueblo Weisbrod Aircraft Museum Pueblo Airport, Pueblo, CO
- Spirit of Flight Center Lafayette, CO
- Wings Over the Rockies Air and Space Museum Old Lowry AFB Campus, Denver, CO

Lists

- List of airport museums in the United States
- List of American Aero Squadrons
