= Colorado Aviation Hall of Fame =

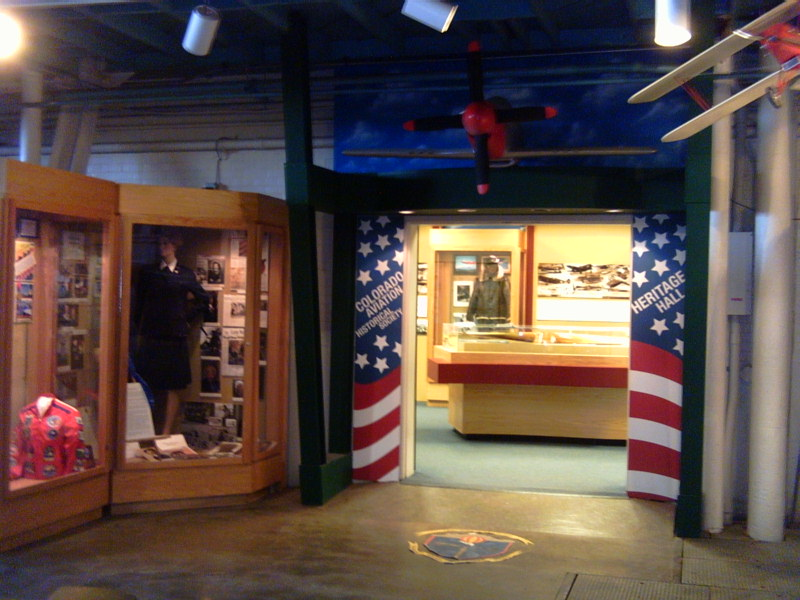
CAHS Heritage Hall, Wings Museum

The Colorado Aviation Hall of Fame was established by the Colorado Aviation Historical Society (CAHS) in Denver, Colorado, US, on November 11, 1969, for the State of Colorado. The original and first ten Colorado aviation pioneers were inducted into the Hall on that date. Guest speaker for the event was author Ernest K. Gann. The Hall of Fame is part of the Society's Heritage Hall in the Wings Over the Rockies Air and Space Museum, Denver, Colorado.

Originally, to be considered for the Hall of Fame, ones' pioneering activities were to be completed before November 11, 1918. Subsequently, the cut-off date was changed to 1935, then eliminated. Aviation pioneering including development of airports, air mail routes, flying training facilities, flight management and mapping, aviation and aerospace manufacturing and maintenance, aviation weather tracking and forecasting, teaching and educating, advancements in aviation business, and military achievements. These are some of the activities that challenged Colorado aviators and aviation business persons.

In the first 25 years of the Hall of Fame, over 160 Coloradans and organizations have been inducted and so honored.

== Pioneers of southern Colorado ==
CAHS Southern Pioneers featured at the Pueblo Weisbrod Aircraft Museum

CAHS has highlighted the history of its Hall Of Fame Laureates from Southern Colorado with an exhibit of photos and biographies.

== Original ten inductees of 1969 ==
1. Ivy Baldwin^{Bio}
2. Allan F. Bonnalie
3. Ira Boyd "Bumps" Humphreys - See Grant-Humphreys Mansion.
4. Albert E. Humphreys
5. Will D. "Billy" Parker
6. Chriss J. Peterson
7. Reginald Sinclaire
8. George W. Thompson
9. Frank A. Van Dersarl
10. Jerry Cox Vasconcells, World War I Ace

List of current inductees

- Complete list

== See also ==
- North American aviation halls of fame
- National Aviation Hall of Fame
