= Ivy Baldwin =

American balloonist and aeronaut

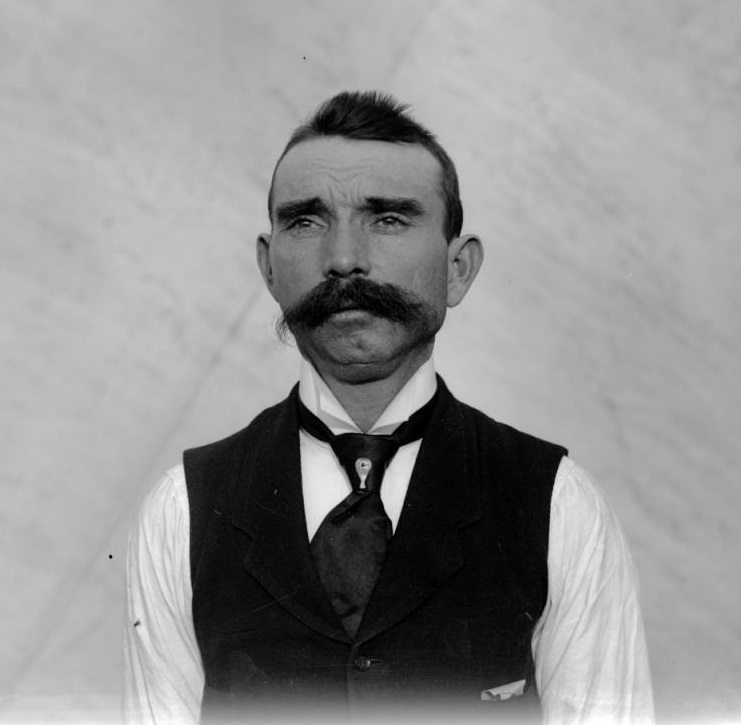
- Baldwin in 1894
- Born: William Ivy; July 31, 1866; Houston, Texas, U.S.
- Died: October 8, 1953 (aged 87); Eldorado Canyon State Park, Boulder County, Colorado, U.S.
- Occupation: Pilot
- Known for: Circumnavigation

Ivy Baldwin was born William Ivy on July 31, 1866 in Houston, Texas. He changed his name in later years to Ivy Baldwin so that he could be billed as one of "The Baldwin Brothers". Baldwin was an American balloonist, aeronaut and high-wire performer. He is credited with being the first aviator to be shot down during wartime in the U.S. during the Spanish–American War.

== Biography ==
In 1877, he performed in Thayer Dollar Circus as a tightrope walker. He later joined with Thomas and Sam Baldwin—billed as "The Baldwin Brothers"—performing high wire acts as well as balloon ascensions and parachuting. The Baldwin Brothers performed using handmade balloons filled with hot air which would ascend to 2500 feet as Ivy Baldwin performed acrobatics and would parachute to the ground. He became a solo performer in 1893.

Baldwin joined the U.S. Army Signal Corps the following year as a sergeant, piloting and maintaining their demonstration balloon. In 1898, during the Spanish-American War, Baldwin was the pilot of the hot air balloon that gave U.S. troops location information of Spanish snipers before the Battle of San Juan Hill. The balloon was shot down on June 30, 1898, and landed in the Aguadores River. Baldwin was later honorably discharged. Returning to performance, he dubbed himself "the air hero of the late War" and sold fragments of the destroyed balloon.

From 1890 to 1907, Baldwin spent many summers at Denver's Elitch Gardens amusement park, where he made balloon ascents on Saturdays and Sundays, sometimes performing stunts on a trapeze as he ascended. In 1902, for the first time, Ivy Baldwin parachuted to the earth from the balloon. Mary Elitch Long, the owner of the gardens, was quoted as saying: "Mr. Long and I were the first passengers to soar into the Colorado sky. I must confess there were some apprehensive gasps as the starting whistle blew, but our fears soon gave place to a feeling of power and security as we ascended... From the great height of fifteen hundred feet, all Denver and its environs of mountains and plains lay spread before our entranced vision."

Ivy Baldwin lived many years in Eldorado Canyon, in Boulder County, Colorado. He celebrated his 82nd birthday by tightrope walking 125 feet above South Boulder Creek, a crossing he'd made 80 times in 40 years. Baldwin died at home in his sleep on Oct. 8, 1953, at the age of 87.

=== Halls of fame ===
He was the first inductee to the Colorado Aviation Hall of Fame in 1969, along with 9 other early Colorado aviators. They stated that since his early years he had “a sincere urge to get into the air, one way or the other.” The ceremony noted that he was also "the first person to fly a powered 'air craft' in the State of Colorado" since he had made a brief flight "in a self-designed and self-built powered dirigible-type balloon".

He was selected to be in the Nevada Aerospace Hall of Fame for being "the first person to successfully fly an airplane in the State of Nevada." which he accomplished on June 23, 1910.

== See also ==
Original ten 1969 Colorado Aviation Hall of Fame Laureates

- Ivy Baldwin
- Allan F. Bonnalie
- Ira Boyd "Bumps" Humphreys
- Albert E. Humphreys
- Will D. "Billy" Parker
- Chriss J. Peterson
- Reginald Sinclaire
- George W. Thompson
- Frank A. Van Dersarl
- Jerry Cox Vasconcells
