= Jerry Cox Vasconcells =

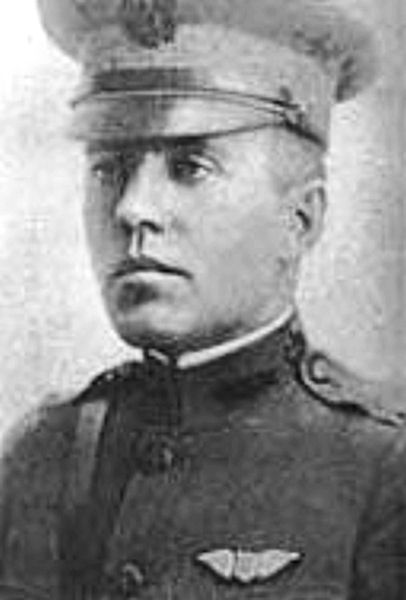
- Captain Jerry Cox Vasconcells, 27th Aero Squadron, Commander, 185th Aero Squadron
- Born: December 3, 1892; Lyons, Kansas, United States
- Died: April 17, 1950 (aged 57); Denver, Colorado, USA
- Military career
- Allegiance: United States
- Branch: Air Service, United States Army
- Rank: Captain
- Unit: 27th Aero Squadron
- Commands: 185th Aero Squadron
- Conflicts: World War I
- Awards: French Croix de Guerre

Captain Jerry Cox Vasconcells (December 3, 1892 – April 17, 1950) was a World War I flying ace credited with six aerial victories. Vasconcells was inducted into the Colorado Aviation Hall of Fame in its first ceremony of 1969.

== Biography ==
=== Early years ===
Jerry Vasconcells was born in Lyons, Kansas on December 3, 1892. He attended East High School, in Denver, Colorado, attended Dartmouth College, and then graduated from the University of Denver Law School.

=== Military service ===
Vasconcells joined the U.S. Army Air Corps at the onset of World War I, and was sent to France in 1917 to fly combat. While flying the SPAD biplane in combat, he was shot down, but with skilled flying he landed in "no man's land" and was rescued by Allied soldiers. He became an "ace" with a score of six airplanes and two balloons. He was awarded the French Croix de Guerre and other honors from both the French and American governments. Vasconcells was a flight commander for the 27th Aero Squadron of the 1st Pursuit Group, American Expeditionary Forces (AEF) in 1918, and by war's end he was in command of the 185th Aero Squadron, the first night pursuit squadron of the AEF. Jerry Vasconcells was Colorado's only ace of the war.

Vasconcells' military career included associations with other renown aviators, including Capt. Eddie Rickenbacker, Gen. Billy Mitchell and Frank Luke. In 1919, he acquired a Military Aviator flight rating and was promoted to major. Upon returning to the United States, he had numerous health issues relating to his military flying.

=== Commercial businesses ===
He and Mayor Benjamin F. Stapleton established Denver's Municipal Airfield with scheduled commercial flight service. During his commercial aviation career in Denver, he served two terms as chairman of the Colorado Aeronautics Commission, and helped organize the first Colorado Air Meet in 1921. Jerry helped to create and organize the Quiet Birdmen Association.

He died at his home in Denver in 1950.

== See also ==
- List of World War I flying aces from the United States

Original ten 1969 Colorado Aviation Hall of Fame Laureates

- Ivy Baldwin
- Allan F. Bonnalie
- Ira Boyd "Bumps" Humphreys
- Albert E. Humphreys
- Will D. "Billy" Parker
- Chriss J. Peterson
- Reginald Sinclaire
- George W. Thompson
- Frank A. Van Dersarl
- Jerry Cox Vasconcells
- List of current Hall of Fame Laureates

== Bibliography ==
- American Aces of World War I. Norman Franks, Harry Dempsey. Osprey Publishing, 2001. ISBN 1-84176-375-6, ISBN 978-1-84176-375-0.
- Terror of the Autumn Skies: The True Story of Frank Luke, America's Rogue Ace of World War I, 2008, by Blaine L. Pardoe, Skyhorse Publishing, New York, New York; ISBN 978-1-60239-252-6
