= General Motors TBM-3E Avenger No. 86180 =

- TBM-3E Avenger Torpedo Bomber
- U.S. National Register of Historic Places
- New Jersey Register of Historic Places
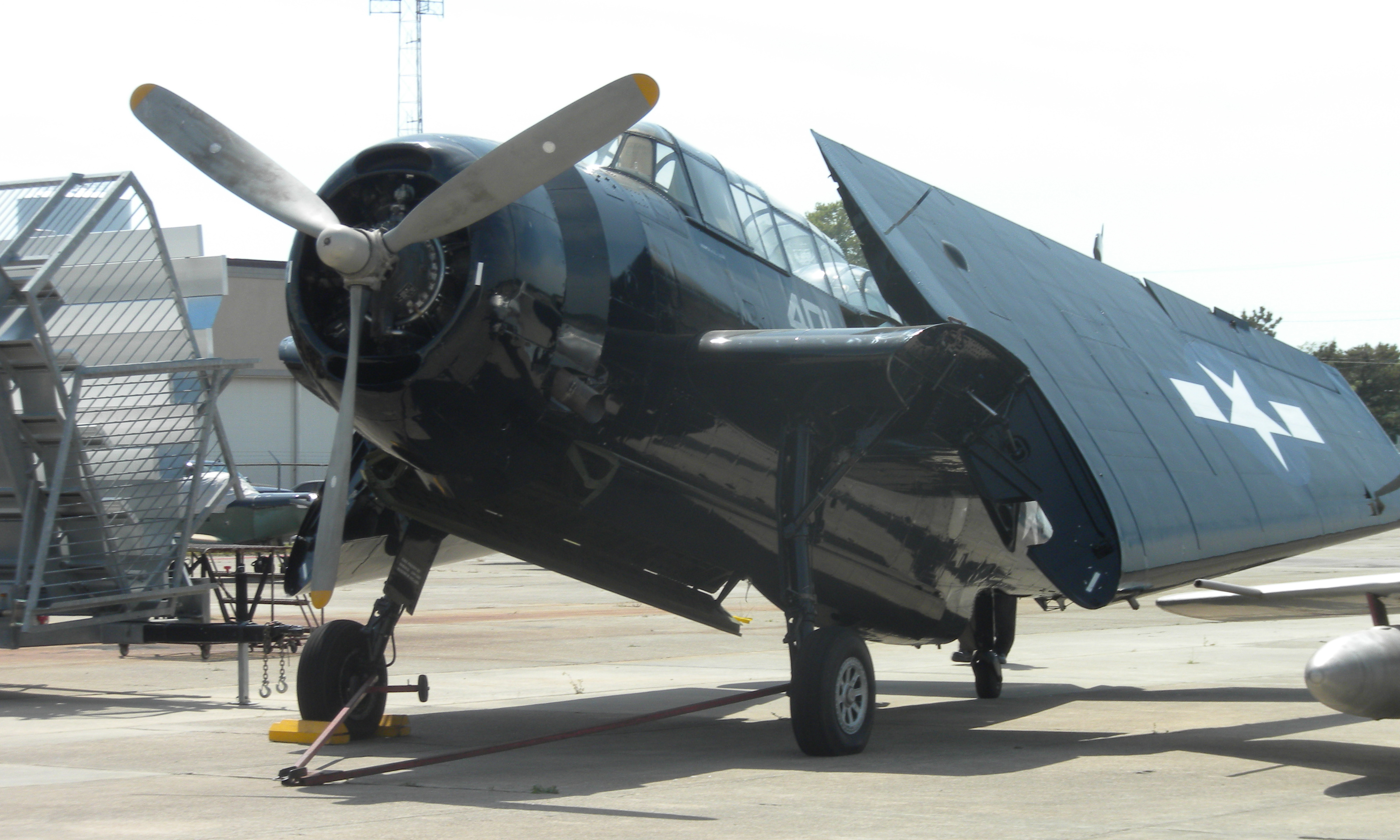

- Location within Cape May County, New Jersey Location within New Jersey Location within the United States
- Location: 500 Forrestal Road, Cape May Airport, Lower Township, New Jersey
- Coordinates: 39°0′17″N 74°54′36″W
- Built: 1945
- Architect: General Motors/Eastern Aircraft Div.
- NRHP reference No.: 03000019
- NJRHP No.: 4116

Significant dates
- Added to NRHP: February 11, 2003
- Designated NJRHP: December 19, 2002

General Motors TBM-3E Avenger No. 86180 is a surviving TBM Avenger torpedo bomber located at the Naval Air Station Wildwood Aviation Museum in Lower Township, Cape May County, New Jersey, United States. The plane, a variant of the Grumman-designed Avenger, was built by General Motors in 1945. Listed as TBM-3E Avenger Torpedo Bomber, it was added to the National Register of Historic Places on February 11, 2003, for its significance in military history.

== See also ==
- List of surviving Grumman TBF Avengers
- National Register of Historic Places listings in Cape May County, New Jersey
