= George Thompson (aviator) =

George W. Thompson
- Born: April 3, 1888 near Sharon Springs, Kansas
- Died: August 21, 1912 (aged 24); Lamar, Colorado
- Known for: Early self-taught aviator.

George W. Thompson (April 3, 1888 – August 21, 1912) was a self-taught aviator, and is one of the first Coloradan flyers. He was born near Sharon Springs, Kansas. Thompson built a Mathewson biplane, a Curtiss design, and soloed it on January 4, 1911.

== Biography ==
His early career was working for the Mathewson Auto Company, Denver, Colorado. The company name later became the Mathewson Aeroplane Company. Thompson made several flights on his first flying day, and in the first year, about 100 flights during 1911. He was known to travel with his aircraft throughout Colorado and also in Wyoming, especially at county fairs with aerial shows. Thompson made the first flight ever in Wyoming using a Mathewson plane for the Independence Day celebration in Gillette, Wyoming in 1911.

In his short life, he built and flew nine "headless biplanes". He also helped to organize the American Federation of Aviators, and served as president in 1911-1912.

Thompson's primary flights took place at the Sable airstrip, a primitive airfield and auto racing track, located between the Fitzsimons Hospital and the Rocky Mountain Arsenal, the area of the old Stapleton Airport. For some of his Colorado travels, he disassembled his aircraft and shipped it in a boxcar to his destination.

George Thompson made a number of early contributions to Colorado aviation, but his life was cut short at the age of 24 by a crash at the Prowers County Fair at Lamar, Colorado on August 21, 1912. According to the Colorado Aviation Historical Society, during a flight, he hit a treetop, was thrown out and fell about 40 feet (12 m) to the ground, with the aircraft falling upon him. The New York Times gave a different account, reporting that his airplane "was tipped over by a light breeze" at a height of 200 feet (61 m); Thompson jumped, but was fatally crushed by his machine. The Denver Post stated he lost control of his Mathewson biplane at an altitude of 200 feet after he "struck an air pocket" and hit the tree on the way down.

His headstone at Olinger Crown Hill Cemetery in Wheat Ridge, Colorado are engraved with the words "George W. Thompson, Colorado's First Aviator".

=== Colorado Hall of Fame ===
Thompson was inducted into the Colorado Aviation Hall of Fame in its first ceremony of 1969.

== See also ==
Original ten 1969 Colorado Aviation Hall of Fame Laureates

- Ivy Baldwin
- Allan F. Bonnalie
- Ira Boyd "Bumps" Humphreys
- Albert E. Humphreys
- Will D. "Billy" Parker
- Chriss J. Peterson
- Reginald Sinclaire
- George W. Thompson
- Frank A. Van Dersarl
- Jerry Cox Vasconcells
- List of current Hall of Fame Laureates
