= Wings Over the Rockies Air and Space Museum =

Aerospace museum in Denver, Colorado, USA

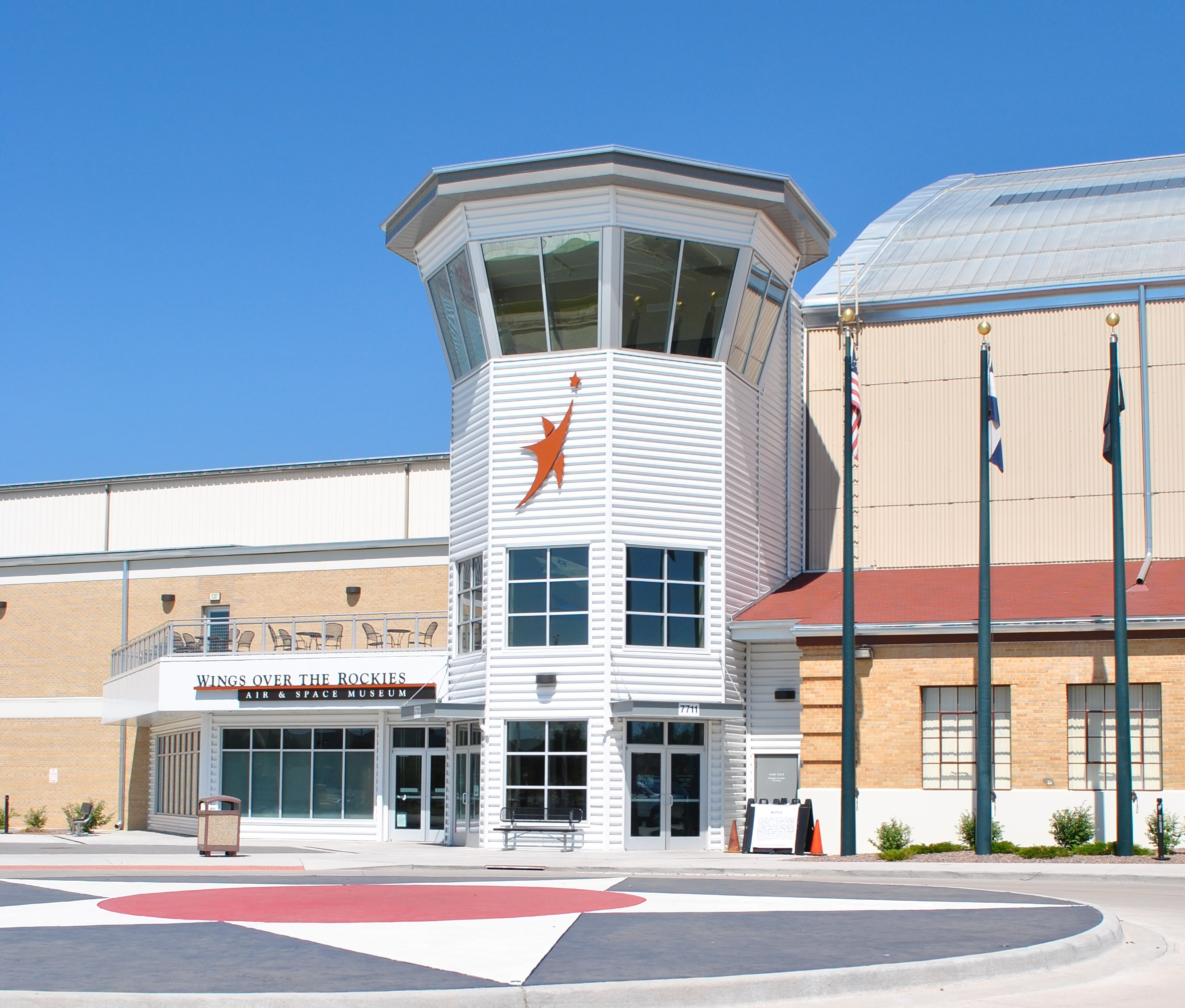

- Location within Colorado
- Former name: The Lowry Heritage Museum (1984-1994)
- Established: 1 December 1994
- Location: 7711 E. Academy Blvd Denver, Colorado, U.S. Lowry Campus (formerly Lowry Air Force Base)
- Coordinates: 39.7210°N 104.8957°W
- Type: Aerospace museum
- Collections: Lowry Air Force Base history Colorado aerospace history
- CEO: David Dickerson
- Curator: Stewart Bailey
- Public transit access: Regional Transportation District
- Parking: On-site (no charge)
- Website: wingsmuseum.org

The Wings Over the Rockies Air and Space Museum (WOTR) is located on the former Lowry Air Force Base in Denver, Colorado, United States. The museum preserves the history of Lowry AFB's operations from 1938 to 1994 in its collections, archives, and research library.

== History ==
From 1937 to 1994 Lowry Air Force Base, located on the eastern edge of Denver, was primarily a technical training center. It graduated more than 1.1 million enlisted members and officers in skills ranging from armament to photography, aiding the country's war efforts in World War II, the Korean War, the Vietnam War and the Cold War. From the 1980s Lowry Air Force Base remained one of Colorado's largest employers, with approximately 10,000 military and civilian men and women, providing an economic impact approaching $1 billion annually.

In 1994, the United States Air Force transferred Hangar 1 to a group of volunteers, who established Wings Over the Rockies Air and Space Museum. The museum includes more than 182,000 square feet of hangar space and 50 aircraft, spanning nearly half a century of air and space flight.

In 1997, the Colorado State Legislature passed House Bill 1269 that made Wings Over the Rockies Air and Space Museum Colorado's official air and space museum, and the site of the Colorado Aviation Historical Society's Colorado Aviation Hall of Fame.

== Facilities ==
"Exploration of Flight" is a 15-acre (6.1 ha) campus located at Centennial Airport that serves as the second location of Wings Over the Rockies. It houses future-focused aviation and space galleries and exhibits.

== Exhibits ==
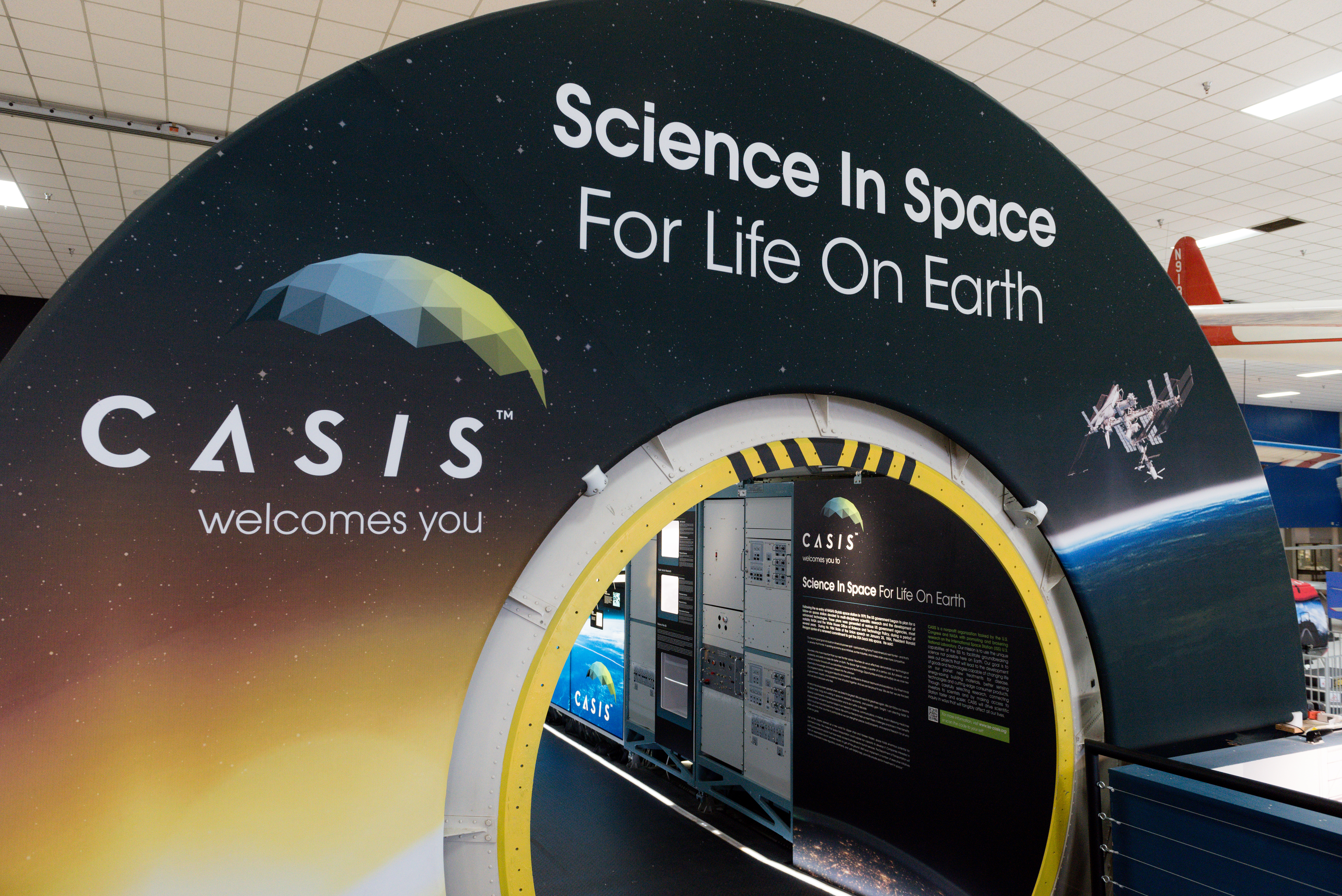
Casis - Science in Space

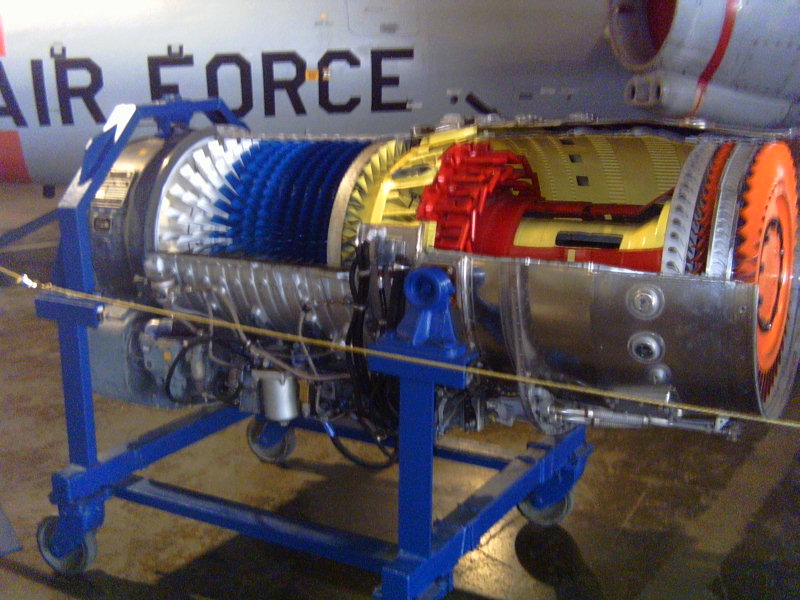
Westinghouse J46-WE-8 cutaway engine

- Space Station Freedom command module mockup built by Martin Marietta with CASIS' Science in Space Exhibit of the ISS
- U.S. NASA Astronauts with Colorado connections.
- Aircraft engine collection on display, both propeller and jet engines
- Nuclear weapons collection on display
- The Aviator Uniform Collection Exhibit Room.
- The Cold War Exhibit.
- The History of Avionics Exhibit Room.
- The Colorado Air National Guard Heritage Exhibit Room with Buckley Field and Buckley Air Force Base exhibits.
- The Colorado Aviation Historical Society's Heritage Hall featuring the Colorado Aviation Hall of Fame.
- Rocky Mountain Airways Flight 217 Memorial.
- Former United Airlines DC-10 and Boeing 727-200 cockpits
- Lucasfilm X-Wing Starfighter: a 3/4 scale replica built to promote the re-release of the first three Star Wars films in 1997.
- MaxFlight: a 360° full-motion flight simulator.

== Collection ==
=== Military ===
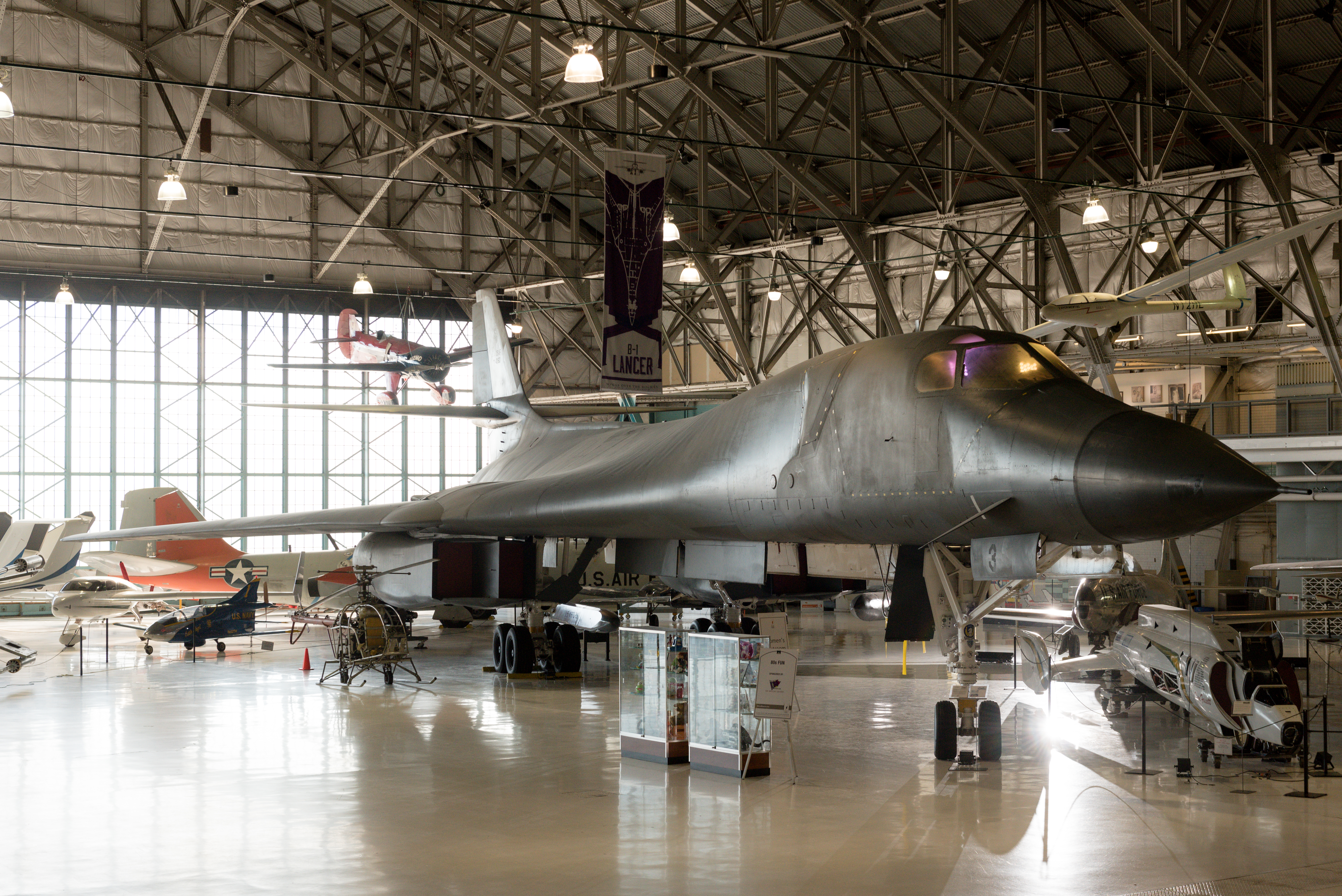
B-1A Lancer

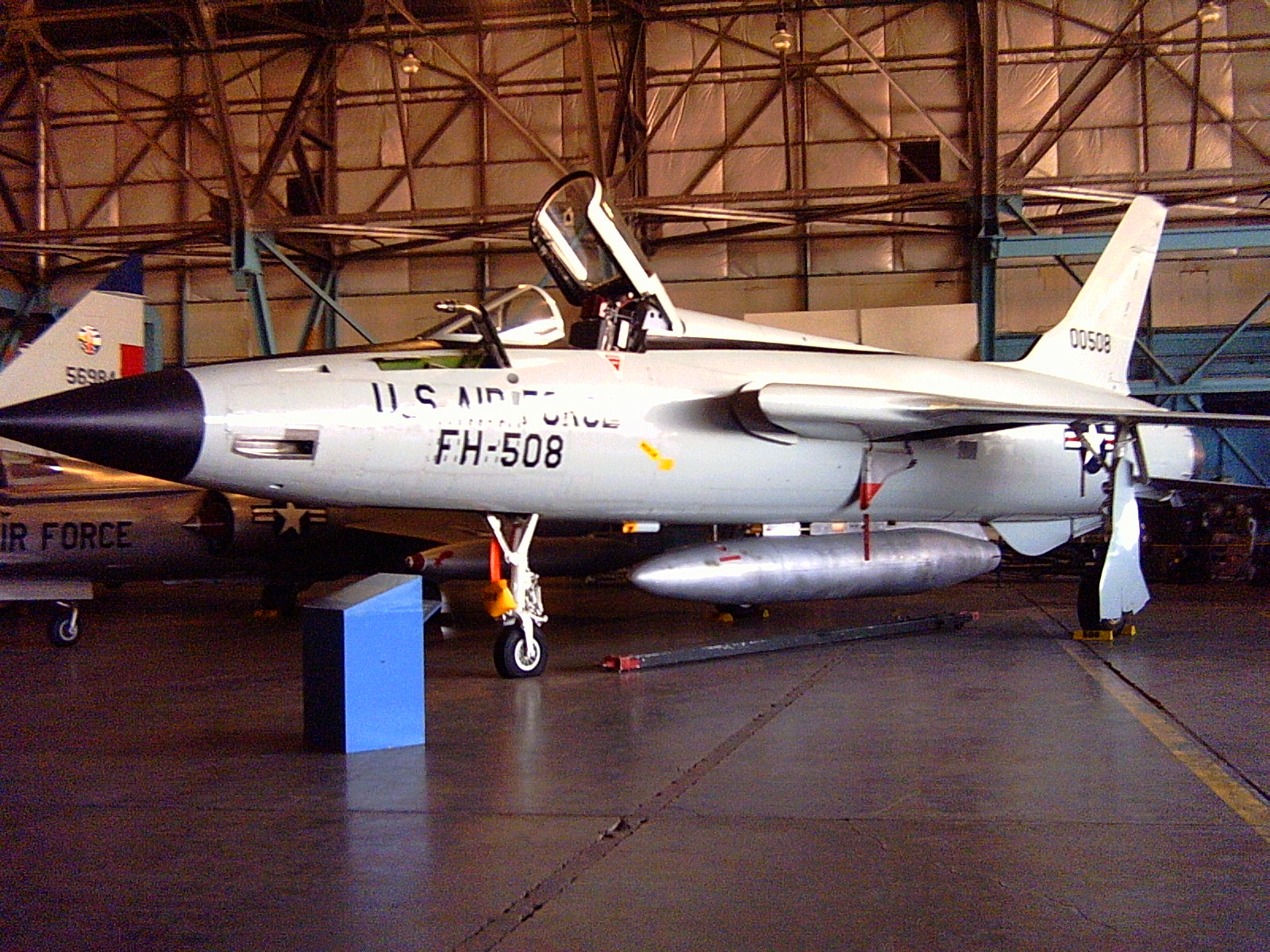
Republic F-105D 60-0508 Thunderchief, formerly with 49th TFW

- Beechcraft UC-45 Expeditor 42-37496
- Boeing GB-52B Stratofortress 52-0005
- Cessna U-3 57-5894
- Convair F-102A Delta Dagger 56-0984
- Douglas B-18A Bolo 39-25
- General Dynamics FB-111A 68-0287
- Grumman F-14A Tomcat 159829
- Lockheed F-104C Starfighter 56-0910
- Lockheed T-33A 56-1710
- LTV A-7D Corsair II 73-0996 "Speedwell"
- Martin EB-57E Canberra 55-4293
- McDonnell F-101B Voodoo 58-0271
- McDonnell Douglas F-4E Phantom II 66-0286 "Julie"
- North American F-86H Sabre 53-1308
- North American F-100D Super Sabre 56-3417
- Northrop Grumman EA-6B Prowler
- Republic F-105D Thunderchief 60-0508
- Republic RF-84K Thunderflash 52-7266
- Rockwell B-1A 74-0160
- Schweizer TG-4 92-1541
- Mikoyan-Gurevich MiG-23 MLD
- Bell UH-1 Iroquois

=== Civilian ===
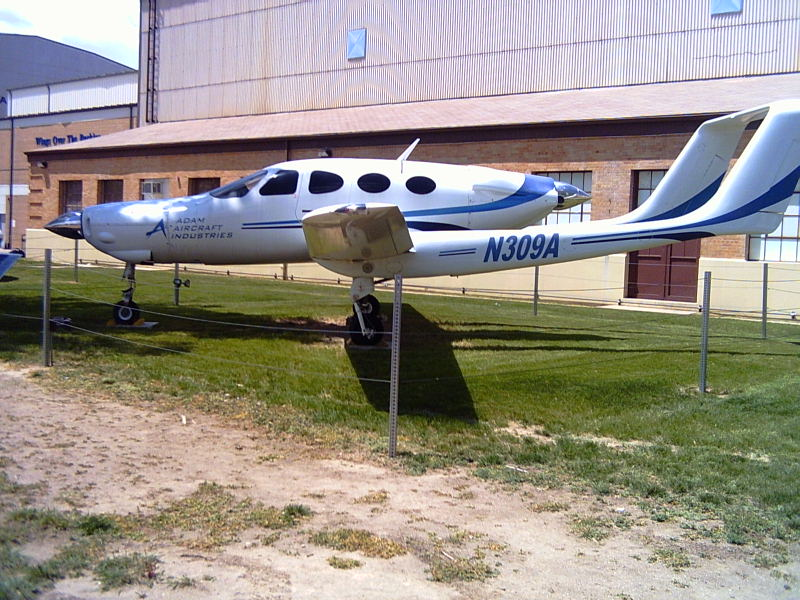
Adam M309 twin engine. May 2007, current on display inside.

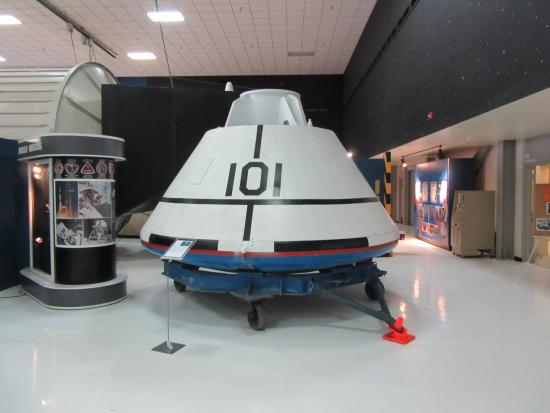
The McDonnell Apollo Boilerplate BP-1101A Capsule was used by NASA to test touchdown for the Apollo program.

- Aerospatiale AS316 Alouette III
- Alexander Eaglerock
- Adam M-309 (No. N309A)
- Aviat Special (No. N15JB)
- Ball-Bartoe Jetwing
- Christen Eagle II (No. N6LA)
- HL-20 Personnel Launch System on loan
- Learjet 24 (No. N241JA). donated by Lynn Krogh of International Jet
- Murray Model T homebuilt helicopter, 1st to register in Colo. (No. N7222)
- Piper J3C-65 Cub (No. N42427)
- Rand Robinson KR-1 (No. N60BV)
- Schweizer SGS 1-24 Brigadoon, on loan from National Soaring Museum (No. N91888)
- Sky Star Aircraft Corp Kitfox
- Aerosport Woody Pusher (No. N393EA)

=== Space ===
- McDonnell Apollo Boilerplate BP-1101A (No. 101), on loan from Smithsonian
- HL-20 Personnel Launch System "Dream Chaser" on loan
- Centaur Upper Stage

== Programs ==
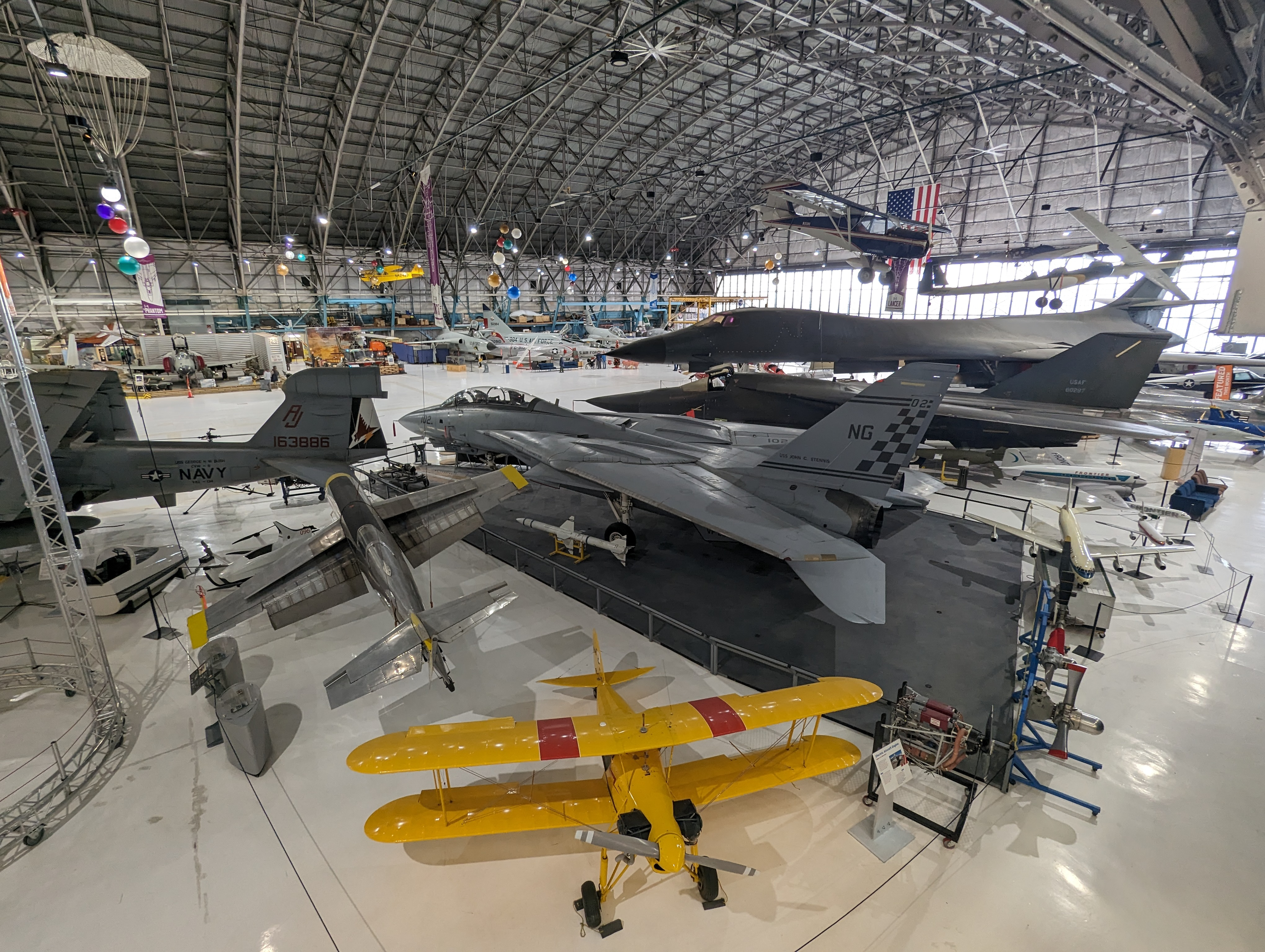
Wings Over the Rockies in 2023

Wings Aerospace Pathways offers instruction to middle and high school students on aviation and engineering through hands-on aerospace-themed STEM experiences.

- Pilot Pathway offers Young Eagles, a program created by the Experimental Aircraft Association, to introduce students ages 8 to 17 to aviation by giving them their first free ride in an airplane. The program also includes the ground school workshop, which offers basic pilot training. Wings Over the Rockies flight training scholarships are provided by the James C. Ray Foundation for Colorado students ages 15 to 18.
- Drone Pilot Pathway includes an introductory drone flight course and visual line of sight (VLOS) training to earn a Part 107 Remote Pilot Certificate, which allows an operator to fly drones commercially. Field training is also offered.

The Teacher Flight Program encourages STEM Colorado teachers to become Teacher Envoys and provides a free, 20-minute flight.

The Technical Research Library contains over 15,000 book titles on aviation and aerospace and 800 titles covering ballooning, aviation and aerospace in English and other languages. Extensive documents about Lowry Air Force Base history include over 1,000 digital photos of the base. The library also has vintage airline tables, seat magazines and a collection of rare NASA documents.

The museum produces a television show, "Behind the Wings", that airs on Rocky Mountain PBS. It teaches museum visitors and viewers about the history, innovation and future of aviation.

== See also ==
- CAF Rocky Mountain Wing Museum, Grand Junction, Colorado
- Colorado Aviation Historical Society, Denver, Colorado
- Peterson Air and Space Museum, Colorado Springs, Colorado
- Pueblo Historical Aircraft Society, Pueblo, Colorado
- Pueblo Weisbrod Aircraft Museum, Pueblo, Colorado
- Spirit of Flight Center, Lafayette, Colorado
- Vintage Aero Flying Museum, Hudson, Colorado

Related lists

- List of aerospace museums
