= Allan F. Bonnalie =

Early aeroplane builder

Allan F. Bonnallie
- Born: September 29, 1893; Denver, Colorado
- Died: January 29, 1981 (aged 93); Denver, Colorado
- Occupation: aviator
- Known for: Early self-taught aviator, WWI aviator, and airline instructor.

Allan F. Bonnalie (1893–1981) was an early aeroplane builder and aviator in Colorado, multi-medal recipient of World War I in 3 branches of military and created a comprehensive crew training program for United Airlines Flight Training Center, Denver.

Bonnalie was inducted into the Colorado Aviation Hall of Fame in 1969.

== Biography ==
As a child, Bonnalie was so interested in aviation, about 1908, he built a glider patterned after the Wright Flyer plane model. The second plane was flown many times by himself and others. Bonnalie's first powered flight was in 1912 in a plane he designed and flew. His biography was published on Amazon as "A Lifetime In Aviation" by Wayne Lundberg.

=== Military service ===
In 1917, he enlisted in the Aviation Section of the Army Signal Corps and attended the School of Military Aeronautics at the University of California. Prior to WWI, he had a total time in the air of not more than two hours in five or six different planes. In August 1917, he was sent to England, where he was attached to the Royal Flying Corp and participated in air raids against the enemy. Account of his heroism was included in the classic book "War Birds" by E.W. Springs.

In the military, he won the Distinguished Service Order, British, and the Distinguished Service Cross, USA. His ranks in the military: First Lieutenant in the Signal Corps, Lieutenant in the US Navy Reserve (USNR), a Lieutenant Commander in the Navy and Rear Admiral in the USNR in 1953. He was authorized to wear the wings of the Army, Navy, and Britain's RAF.

=== Commercial aviation ===
Bonnalie hired with United Airlines (UAL) from 1929 to 1958, Denver. He later became general manager of Lamsa Airlines, a UAL subsidiary in Mexico. He returned to Denver to manage the United Airlines Flight Training Center and developed a comprehensive crew training program using electronic flight simulators, both at Denver and Chicago, Il.

=== Hall of fame ===
Bonnalie was inducted into the Colorado Aviation Hall of Fame in 1969, the first Hall of Fame along with 9 other Colorado early aviators.

== See also ==
Original ten 1969 Colorado Aviation Hall of Fame Laureates

- Ivy Baldwin
- Allan F. Bonnalie
- Ira Boyd "Bumps" Humphreys
- Albert E. Humphreys
- Will D. "Billy" Parker
- Chriss J. Peterson
- Reginald Sinclaire
- George W. Thompson
- Frank A. Van Dersarl
- Jerry Cox Vasconcells
- List of current Hall of Fame Laureates
