= Spirit of Flight Center =

Idaho aviation history organization

- Established: 2005
- Location: Nampa, ID
- Coordinates: 43.5852°N 116.5188°W
- Type: Aviation
- Director: Gordon R. Page
- Curator: Gordon R. Page
- Website: www.spiritofflight.org, www.warbirdrecovery.com

The Spirit of Flight Center (SOF) is operated by the nonprofit Spirit of Flight Foundation, a 501(C)(3) organization based in Nampa, Idaho. The Spirit of Flight collection, founded by Gordon R. Page, displays limited exhibits on modern and historic aviation, and features aviation history from 1935 to 1975, both military and general aviation. Featured is a Messerschmitt Bf 109 F fighter from Russia. Also on display at SOF is a full-sized bronze statue of Amelia Earhart. SOF is located at the Nampa Municipal Airport, which allows for pilots to fly into the facility.

The Spirit of Flight Center is associated with Air Assets International and exhibits aircraft and artifacts that have been recovered by Warbird Recovery. The TV series Chasing Planes was filmed at SOF and features the museum collection.

== Mission ==
SOF was established to acquire, restore, preserve, and display aviation history to honor all American veterans and aviators, to educate the general public of the significance of aviation, and to inspire future generations to participate and learn about modern and historic aviation.

In 2009, SOF placed a record-setting Learjet 24D on long-term loan to Redstone College of Denver to help students advance their aviation careers.

In 2019, SOF announced that it would focus on its mobile air museum program called History on the Road to bring the world-class collection to larger events. As part of the focus, Living History Flight Experiences are being added by the Spirit of Flight.

== Warbird Recovery ==
The SOF has an aircraft recovery program for international recovery and restoration of rare and historic military aircraft. In 1993, the program started by finding parts of U.S. and Japanese military aircraft in Russia which were recovered and brought to the U.S. The book Warbird Recovery is available to tell that story.

== Other Colorado and Idaho museums ==
- Warhawk Air Museum, Nampa, ID
- CAF Rocky Mountain Wing Museum, Grand Junction, CO
- Colorado Aviation Historical Society, Old Lowry AFB Campus, Denver, CO
- Peterson Air and Space Museum, Peterson AFB, Colorado Springs, CO
- Pueblo Historical Aircraft Society, Pueblo Airport, Pueblo, CO
- Pueblo Weisbrod Aircraft Museum, Pueblo Airport, Pueblo, CO
- Vintage Aero Flying Museum, Platte Valley Airpark, Hudson, CO
- Wings Over the Rockies Air and Space Museum, Old Lowry AFB Campus, Denver, CO
- The National Museum of World War II Aviation, Colorado Springs, CO
