= Colorado Aviation Historical Society =

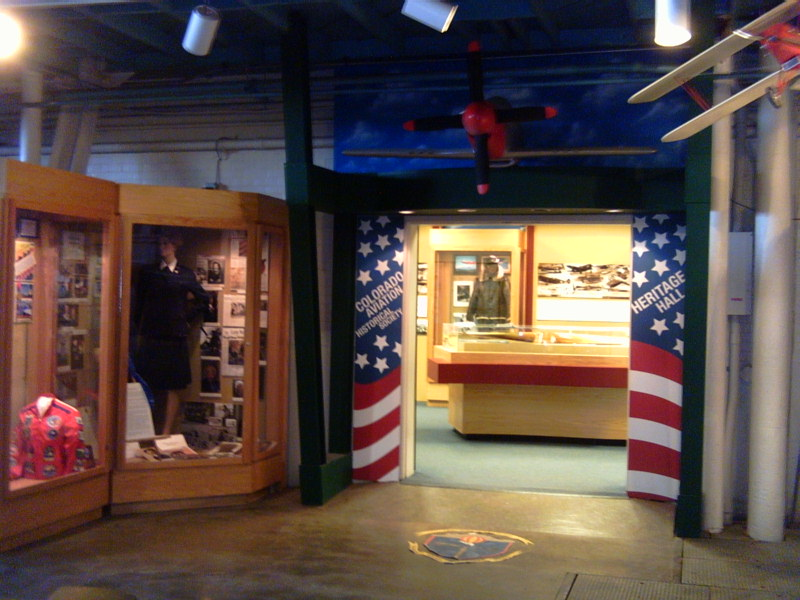
Entrance to CAHS' Heritage Hall, Wings Museum, Denver, CO

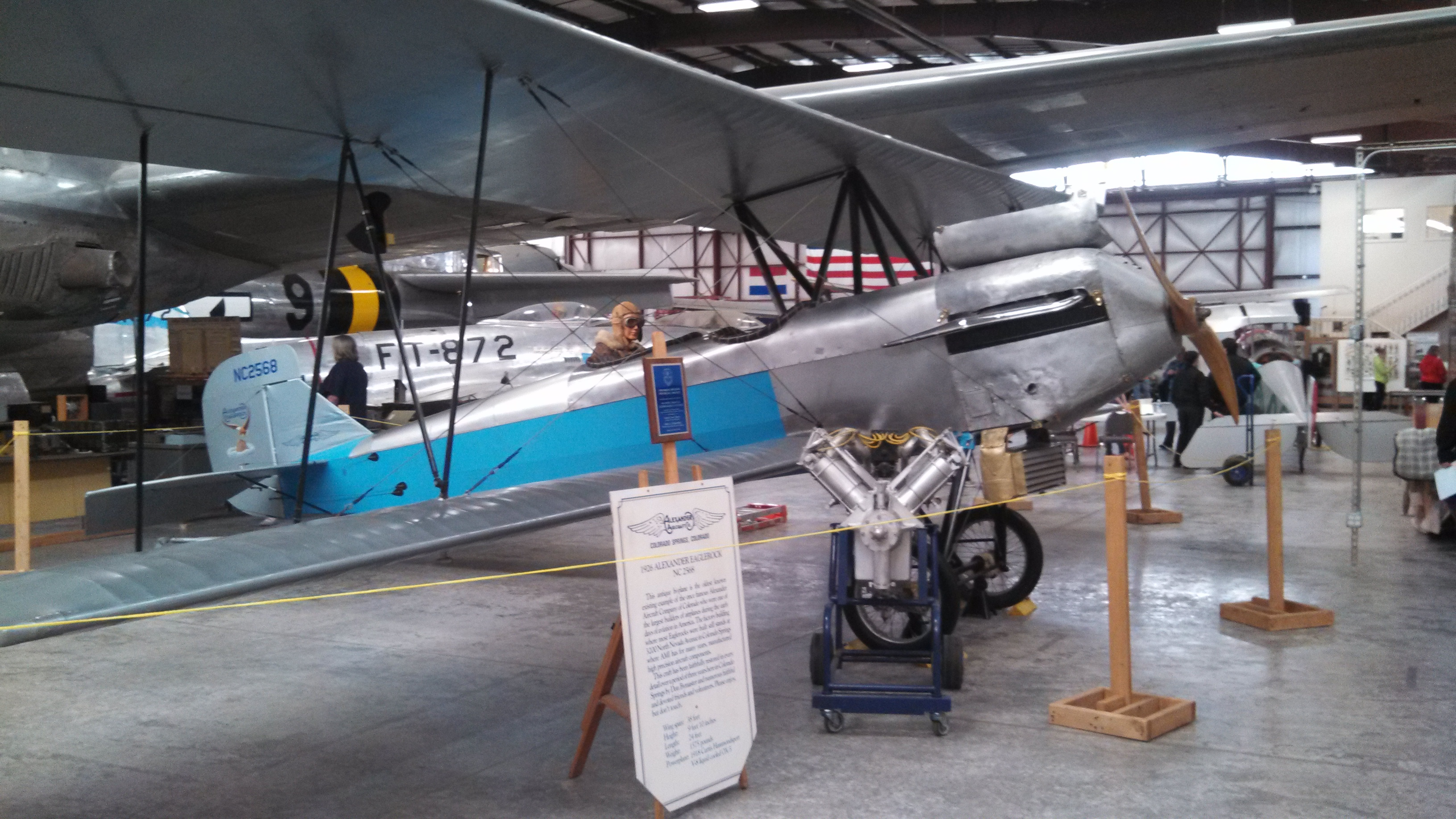
CAHS's Alexander Eaglerock 24,(NC2568), "Longwing" on display at Pueblo Weisbrod Aircraft Museum, Pueblo, Colorado, 2013

The Colorado Aviation Historical Society (CAHS) is located at the Wings Over the Rockies Air and Space Museum Old Lowry AFB Campus, Denver, CO and was founded in 1966. The Society acquires, restores, preserves and provides for public display, aircraft and other objects, documents, items and things of present or historical interest or value in connection with the development and history of aviation in the State of Colorado. CAHS hosts many aviation events and participates in many of Colorado's air shows and fly-ins. The Society has regular membership meetings and publishes a quarterly history journal. The Society owns an Alexander Eaglerock Model 24 Long Wings airplane which is on display at the Wings Over the Rockies Air and Space Museum. The Society also owns a Steen Skybolt aerobatic biplane which is on display at the Pueblo Weisbrod Aircraft Museum Pueblo Airport, Pueblo, CO.

== Colorado Aviation Hall of Fame ==
The CAHS honors the State's historic aviators and conducts the nomination process for induction into the Colorado Aviation Hall of Fame. The Hall of Fame is part of the Heritage Hall Exhibit Room located in the Wings Over the Rockies Air and Space Museum. Exhibits are rotated periodically and depict such history as the Colorado Air National Guard, general aviation, women in aviation, timeline of aviation history, and Colorado civil and commercial aviation. The induction ceremony is held during CAHS's annual banquet.

== Aviation Archaeology Program ==
CAHS' flagship program is the Aviation Archaeology (AvAr) Program. The Program was designed in 2005 and its inaugural class was held in 2006. The rudiments of aviation archaeology training subjects include preliminary project research of accident reports, federal/state laws, simple orienteering, site documentation and investigation. AvAr Program members visit aircraft crash sites, old missiles facilities, former aircraft manufacturing facilities, abandoned airfields and airstrips. There are over 800 military aircraft crash sites in Colorado.

== See also ==
- CAF Rocky Mountain Wing Museum, Grand Junction, CO
- Peterson Air and Space Museum Peterson AFB, Colorado Springs, CO
- Pueblo Historical Aircraft Society Pueblo Airport, Pueblo, CO
- Pueblo Weisbrod Aircraft Museum Pueblo Airport, Pueblo, CO
- Spirit of Flight Center Lafayette, CO
- Vintage Aero Flying Museum Platte Valley Airpark, Hudson, CO
- Wings Over the Rockies Air and Space Museum Old Lowry AFB Campus, Denver, CO
- List of aviation historical societies
- List of airports in Colorado
