= Science Spectrum =

Coordinates: 33°31′43″N 101°52′36″W

- Established: 1989
- Location: Lubbock, Texas
- Type: Science Museum
- Website: ScienceSpectrum

The Science Spectrum is a science and technology museum and aquarium in Lubbock, Texas. It is a 501-C3 nonprofit educational corporation and a member of the Association of Science and Technology Centers.

Sign and front entrance

The Spectrum features over 250 interactive exhibits, live science shows and the only aquarium in West Texas. It also contains the Omni Theater, a 160-degree domed screen movie theater.

== History ==
In 1984, a group of Lubbock residents started visiting science museums across the U.S. and Canada with the aim of establishing one in Lubbock. In 1986, a board of directors was formed and the Science Spectrum was incorporated. The Spectrum opened on February 11, 1989.

== Logo ==
The logo of the Science Spectrum is the prism.
