= Frank A. Van Dersarl =

Self-taught pilot and aircraft builder

- Born: August 13, 1895; Denver, Colorado
- Died: Denver, Colorado
- Occupation: aviator
- Known for: Early self-taught aviator, WWI aviator, and airline instructor.

Frank August Van Dersarl (1895 – 1983) was a self-taught pilot and aircraft builder of early aviation the Colorado. Van Dersarl owned an aviation company, and taught flying; also owned the Denver Union Airport.

== Biography ==
=== Early years ===
At the age of 12, Van Dersarl started assembling, with help from his brothers, a Louis Bleriot aeroplane from plans purchased from France. He flew his Bleriot XI airplane on August 10, 1911 at Sable Airstrip located in Aurora, Colorado at the junction of Sable Blvd. and the Union Pacific railroad tracks. Sable Airstrip was known for a favored location for early flyers and auto racers. During these young years Van Dersarl also built and flew a glider, which was built from a booklet ordered from a London company. It crashed on its first flight.

=== Career ===
Van Dersarl worked for Mountain Flyers Company as General Manager and Chief Pilot; plus giving aviation demonstrations, entertaining flights and exhibitions. They did stunts, flew with fireworks, did aerial photography and sold rides.

In 1921, Van Dersarl founded Rocky Mountain Airlines. For seven years Van Dersarl ran The Denver Post Airshows and was the owner of the Vamp Aircraft Company. At one time, Van Dersarl and his brothers employed Charles A. Lindbergh in their Denver enterprise.

In 1930, Van Dersarl owned and ran the first aircraft school in Denver for 3 years and also was the Chief of the Curtiss-Wright Denver branch. He built the first Mooney airplane. He constructed a total of about 46 airplanes. In later years, he worked on the Boeing B-29 program. Frank also owned and operated the Denver Union Airport, but the depression put an end to this enterprise.

During WWII, he worked at the Denver Opportunity School and trained hundreds of workers and mechanics for the aviation industry. After the war, and until his retirement in 1967, he worked for the Colorado State Highway Department.

=== Hall of fame ===
Frank Van Dersarl was nominated and inducted into the Colorado Aviation Hall of Fame in 1969, along with 9 other early Colorado aviators. His brother, Jules Van Dersarl also inducted in 1971 for his aviation contributions.

Van Dersarl died January 1983 in Denver, Colorado.

== Aircraft built ==
- Van Dersarl's Bleriot is on display at the National Air and Space Museum in Chantilly, VA. It was successfully restored and flown by Javier Arrango in 2012.
- In 1931, Van Dersarl designed, built, and flew an unnamed biplane to 13,000 feet, with a speed of 28 miles per hour; claimed to take-off within 10 feet.

== See also ==
Original ten 1969 Colorado Aviation Hall of Fame Laureates

- Ivy Baldwin
- Allan F. Bonnalie
- Ira Boyd "Bumps" Humphreys
- Albert E. Humphreys
- Will D. "Billy" Parker
- Chriss J. Peterson
- Reginald Sinclaire
- George W. Thompson
- Jerry Cox Vasconcells
