= Platte Valley Airpark =

- IATA: none; ICAO: none; FAA LID: 18V

Summary
- Airport type: Public
- Owner: 18V Management
- Operator: Erin Shoffit
- Location: Hudson, Colorado
- Elevation AMSL: 4,965 ft / 1,513 m
- Coordinates: 40°6′0″N 104°42′4″W
- Website: www.plattevalleyairpark.com
- Interactive map of Platte Valley Airpark

Runways
Direction	Length		Surface
Direction	ft	m	Surface
15/33	4,100	1,250	Asphalt
9/27	2,500	762	Turf/gravel

Statistics (2005)
- Aircraft operations: 4,100
- Based aircraft: 100
- Source: Federal Aviation Administration

Platte Valley Airpark (FAA LID: 18V) is a public-use airport three miles northwest of Hudson, in Weld County, Colorado, United States. It is privately owned by Platte Valley Airpark Ltd. and is 40 miles (64 km) northeast of Denver.

== Facilities ==
Platte Valley Airpark covers 237 acres (96 ha) and has two runways:

- 15/33: 4,100 x 40 ft (1,250 x 12 m): asphalt
- 9/27: 2,500 x 90 ft (762 x 27 m): turf/gravel

In 2005 the airport had 4,100 aircraft operations, average 11 per day: 98% general aviation and 2% military. 78 aircraft are based at this airport: 96% single engine and 4% multi-engine.

== Data ==
=== Navigation ===
- VOR 114.7 (MILE HIGH) .... GPS no .... ILS no

=== Runway ===
- Lights MIRL .... VGSI none .... App Lgts none .... Taxiway dirt soft when wet

=== Communication ===
- CTAF/UNICOM 122.9 .... Lights 122.9 and 5 clicks

=== Services ===
- TSNT Storage hangars and tiedowns
- Fuel 100LL, MOGAS, and self-service, 24-hour credit card
- Aircraft and hangar rentals
- Instructional services

== Accidents and incidents ==
On September 18, 2022, a Sonex airplane that took off from the air-park with one person, its pilot, collided in Boulder County with a Cessna 172 that had taken off from the Rocky Mountain Airport with two persons on board, its pilot in-training and a teacher pilot. Both airplanes crashed and were destroyed on impact, killing all three people on board them.

== See also ==
- Vintage Aero Flying Museum
- Local Commemorative Air Force unit
- List of airports in Colorado
