= List of airport museums in the United States =

This is a list of airport museums in the United States. These are museums that are located inside an airport terminal building, NOT those that are located simply at an airport.

== By state ==
=== Arizona ===
- Phoenix Airport Museum at the Phoenix Sky Harbor International Airport, Phoenix

=== Arkansas ===
- Fort Smith Air Museum at Fort Smith Regional Airport, Fort Smith

=== California ===
- Aviation Museum of Santa Paula at the Santa Paula Airport, Santa Paula
- SFO Museum at the San Francisco International Airport, San Francisco
- Flight Path Museum & Learning Center at Los Angeles International Airport Imperial Terminal, Los Angeles, California

=== Florida ===
- Airport Museum at the Melbourne International Airport, Melbourne

=== Illinois ===
- Butch O'Hare Exhibit at O'Hare International Airport, Chicago, Illinois

=== Indiana ===
- Greater Fort Wayne Aviation Museum at Fort Wayne International Airport, Fort Wayne, Indiana

=== Maryland ===
- College Park Aviation Museum at the College Park Airport, College Park

=== Mississippi ===
- Greenville Air Force Base Museum at the Greenville Mid-Delta Airport, Greenville, Mississippi

=== Nevada ===
- Howard W. Cannon Aviation Museum at the McCarran International Airport, Paradise

=== New Mexico ===
- Walker Aviation Museum at Roswell International Air Center, Roswell, New Mexico

=== North Carolina ===
- Dare County Regional Airport Museum at the Dare County Regional Airport, Manteo

=== Ohio ===
- International Women's Air & Space Museum at the Burke Lakefront Airport, Cleveland

=== Virginia ===
- Ronald Reagan Washington National Airport Exhibit Hall at Ronald Reagan Washington National Airport, Arlington, Virginia

=== Wisconsin ===
- Mitchell Gallery of Flight at the Milwaukee Mitchell International Airport, Milwaukee

== See also ==
- List of aerospace museums
- List of museums in the United States
