= Pueblo Weisbrod Aircraft Museum =

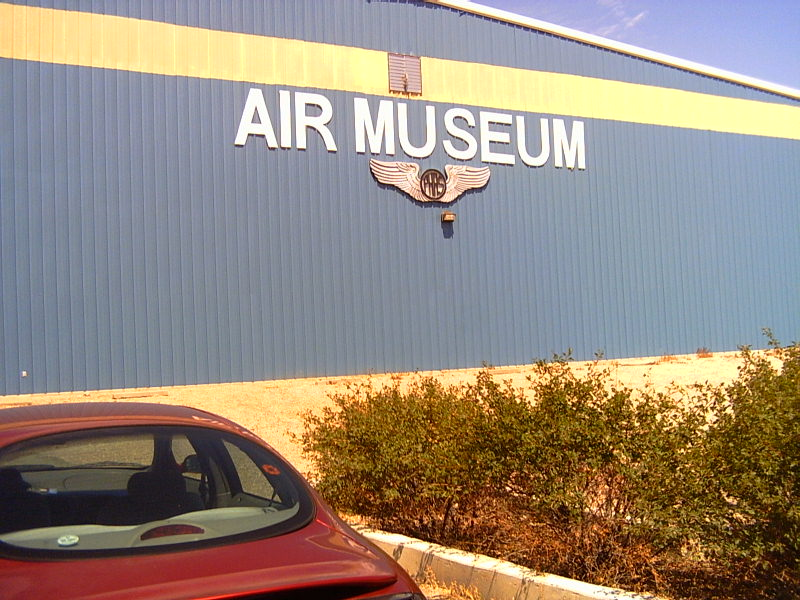

- Location within Colorado
- Established: mid-1970s
- Location: 31001 Magnuson Ave. Pueblo, Colorado
- Coordinates: 38.281882°N 104.498449°W
- Type: Aviation museum
- Founder: Fred Weisbrod
- Website: pwam.org

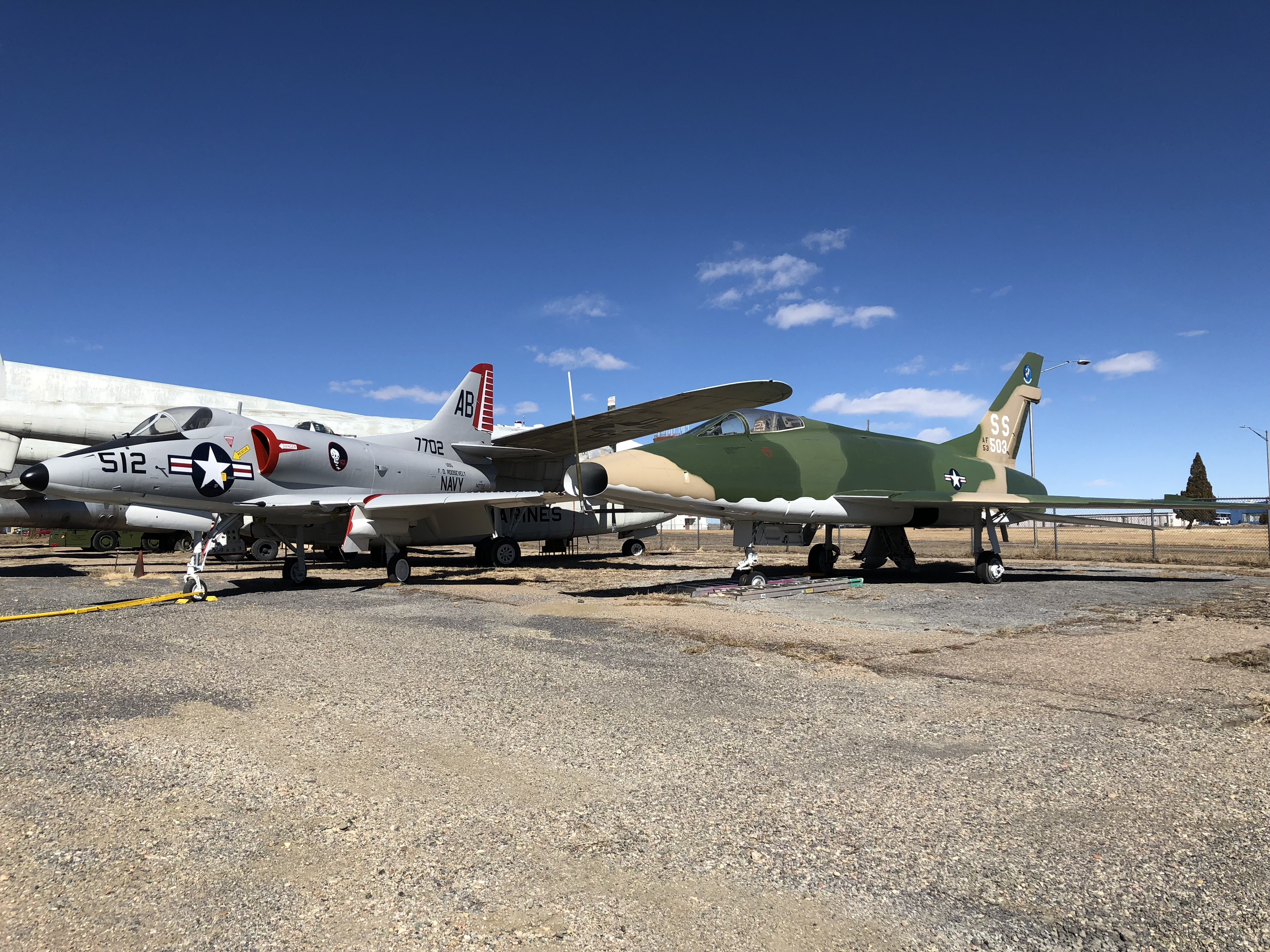
The museum's Douglas A-4C Skyhawk and North American F-100D Super Sabre.

The Pueblo Weisbrod Aircraft Museum is a non-profit aviation museum located in Southern Colorado. It was founded in the mid-1970s by former Pueblo City Manager Fred Weisbrod. The museum is made up of two hangars that were built in 2005 and 2011. The hangars house several of the museum's aircraft along with thousands of artifacts dating from World War I to modern day. PWAM is home to the International B-24 Memorial Museum and the Southern Colorado Space Museum and Learning Center. There are several historic military vehicles in the museum's collection, many of which are still in operational condition. The museum is located six miles east of Pueblo, Colorado on US Highway 50 at the Pueblo Memorial Airport, occupying space on what was the Pueblo Army Air Base during World War II. It is managed and maintained by the Pueblo Historical Aircraft Society.

The museum's collection includes around forty military and civilian aircraft, as well as several military vehicles. The museum hosts periodic open cockpit days and fly ins at the neighboring Pueblo Memorial Airport. PWAM houses an extensive collection of books and research material in the museum's library. The museum is run by a volunteer staff of men and women who provide tours, run the gift shop and do aircraft restoration and maintenance.

== History ==
The museum was founded by a group of aviation enthusiasts in the 1980s. In 2008, the museum requested funding from the county for the building of an additional hangar.

The museum acquired an F-14 by October 2026.

== Aircraft on display ==
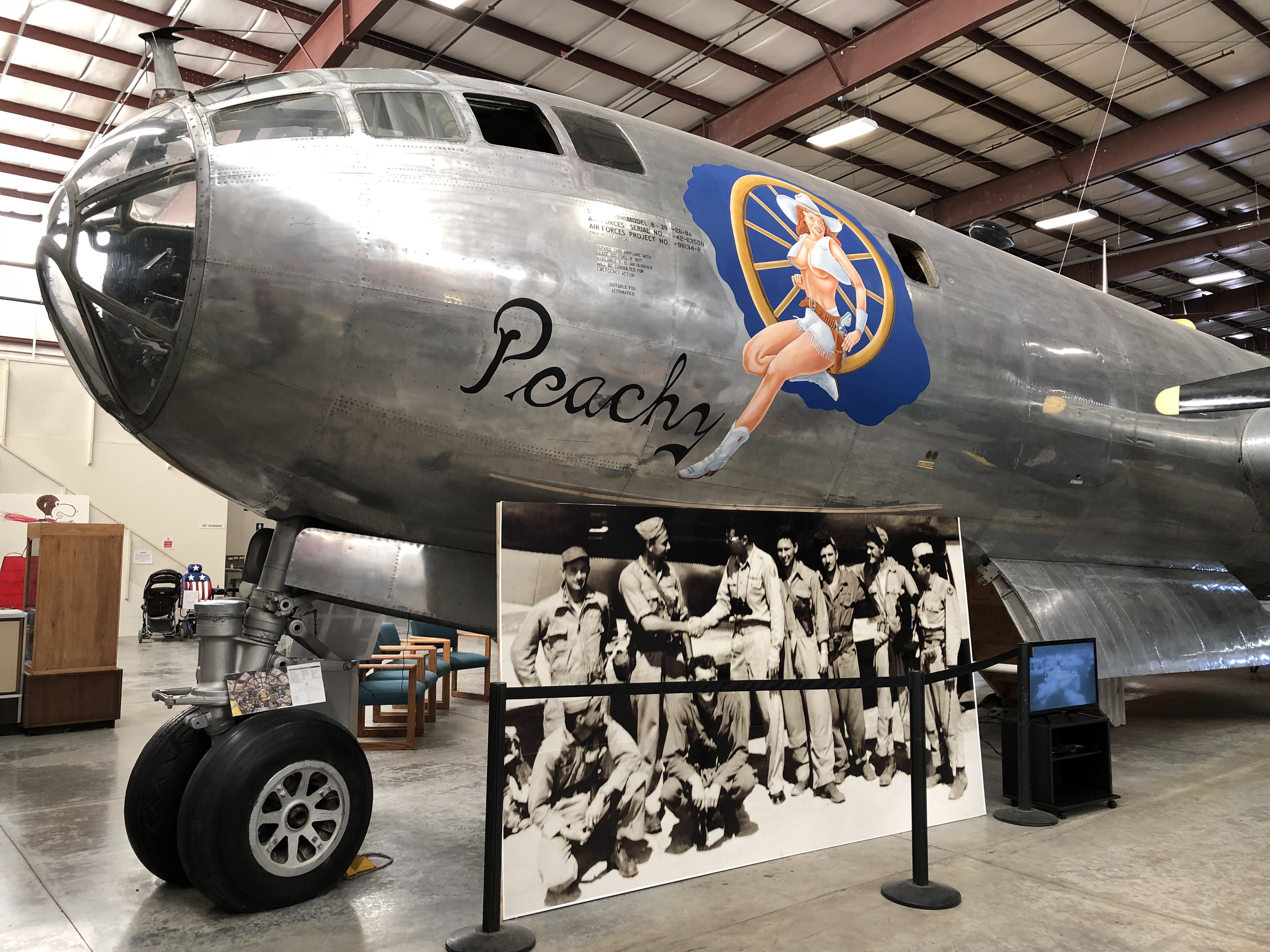
B-29 Superfortress "Peachy" displayed in Hangar One.

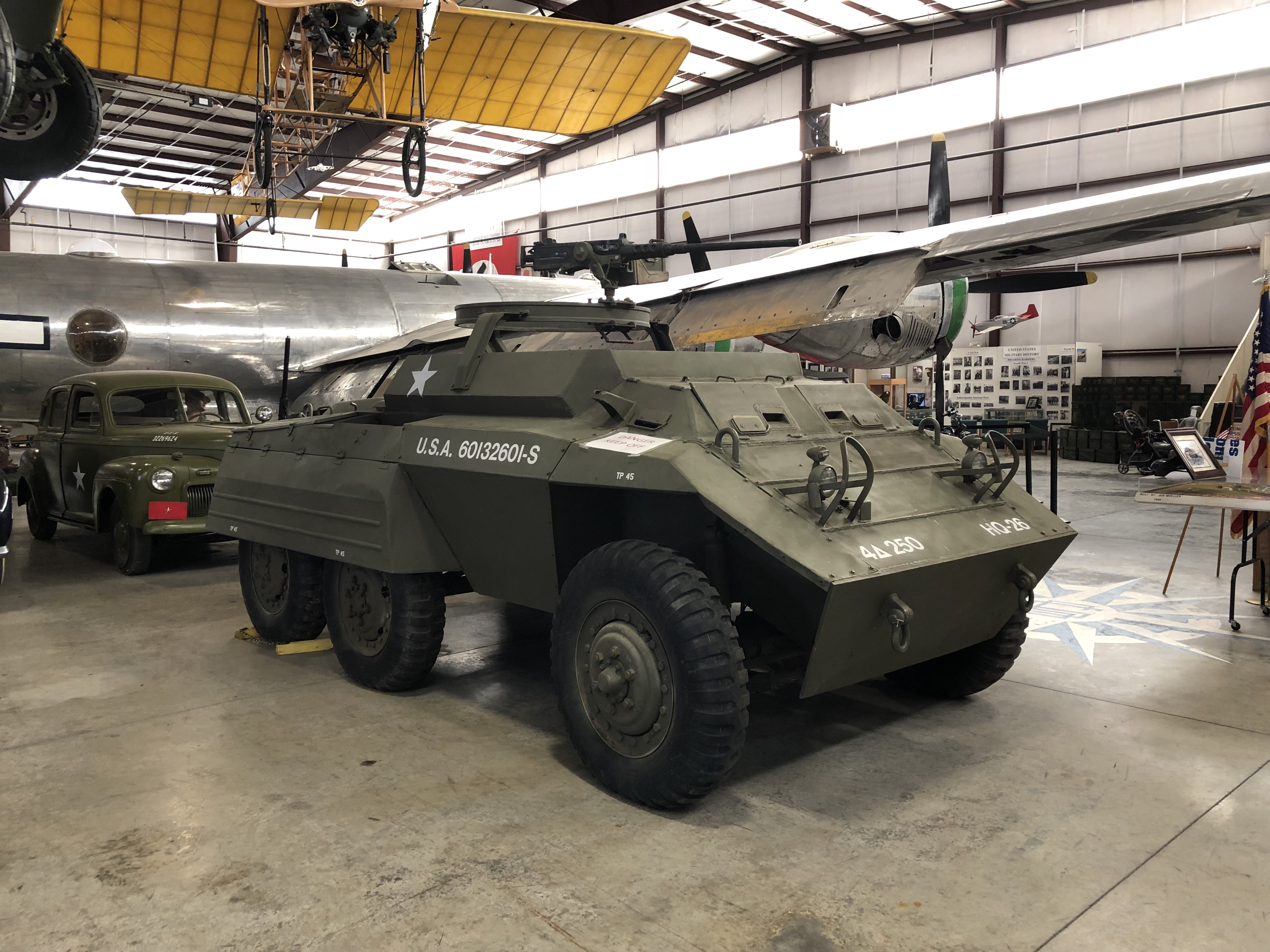
Along with its extensive aircraft collection, PWAM also possesses several historic military vehicles. The museum's M20 is located in Hangar One.

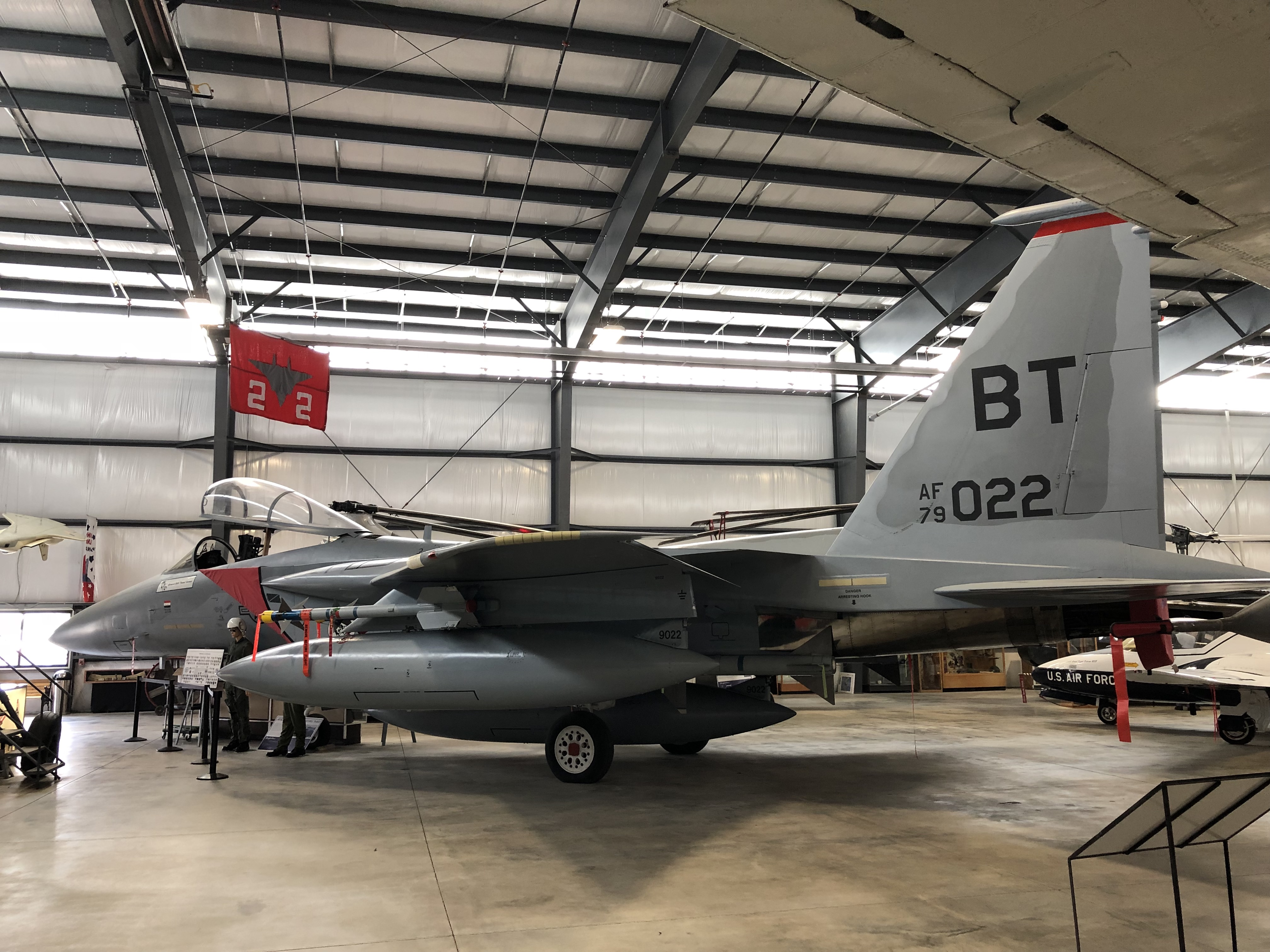
The museum's F-15C Eagle, AF Serial Number 79-0022, downed an Iraqi MiG-23 on 28 January 1991.

=== Military aircraft ===
- Beechcraft T-34 Mentor 144018
- Bell OH-13E Sioux
- Bell UH-1D Iroquois 72-21508
- Bell UH-1M Iroquois 65-9484
- Bell OH-58A Kiowa 69-16271
- Boeing-Stearman PT-13D Kaydet 75-5943
- Boeing B-29 Superfortress 44-62022
- Boeing NB-47E Stratojet 532104
- Boeing B-52F Stratofortress – nose section
- Cessna T-37B Tweet 67-22253
- Convair HC-131A Samaritan 5794
- Douglas R4D-5 17217
- Douglas A-26C Invader 44-35892
- Douglas F-6A Skyray 134936
- Douglas A-4C Skyhawk 147702
- Fairchild C-119 Flying Boxcar 131688
- General Dynamics F-16A Fighting Falcon 80-0499
- Grumman F9F-8 Cougar 138876
- Grumman F11F Tiger 141853
- Lockheed F-80C Shooting Star 49-1872
- Lockheed YF-104 Starfighter 55-2967
- Lockheed SP-2E Neptune 128402
- Lockheed TV-2 SeaStar 137936
- Lockheed C-130E Hercules – nose section 70-1259
- McDonnell Douglas F-15C Eagle 79-0022 – This aircraft shot down an Iraqi MiG-23 during Operation Desert Storm on 28 January 1991.
- McDonnell Douglas F-4D Phantom II – nose section and flight simulator
- North American F-86D Sabre 52-3653
- North American F-100D Super Sabre 55-3503
- North American T-28C Trojan 140064
- North American RA-5C Vigilante 151629
- Piasecki CH-21B Workhorse 53-4347
- PZL-Mielec Lim-2
- PZL-Mielec Lim-6
- Republic F-84C Thunderjet 47-1562
- Royal Aircraft Factory S.E.5 – 7/8 scale replica
- Sikorsky SH-34J Seabat 148002
- SPAD S.XIII – 1/2 scale replica
- Supermarine Spitfire I – replica
- Vought F-8A Crusader

=== Civilian aircraft ===
- Alexander Eaglerock – on loan from the Colorado Aviation Historical Society
- Bleriot XI – replica
- Learjet 25
- Piper J-3 Cub
- Steen Skybolt

== See also ==
- CAF Rocky Mountain Wing Museum, Grand Junction, CO
- Colorado Aviation Historical Society Denver, CO
- Pueblo Historical Aircraft Society Pueblo Airport, Pueblo, CO
- Peterson Air and Space Museum Peterson AFB, Colorado Springs, CO
- Spirit of Flight Center Lafayette, CO
- Vintage Aero Flying Museum Platte Valley Airpark, Husdon, CO
- Wings Over the Rockies Air and Space Museum Old Lowry AFB Campus, Denver, CO

Related lists

- List of aerospace museums
