= CAF Rocky Mountain Wing Museum =

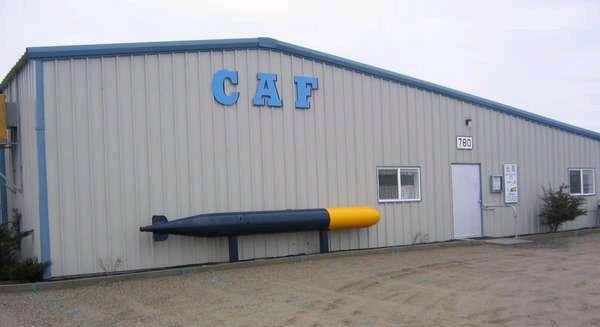
- Established: 1981
- Location: 780 Heritage Way; Grand Junction, Colorado
- Coordinates: 39°07′04″N 108°31′31″W
- Type: Aviation museum
- Website: www.rockymountainwingcaf.org

CAF Rocky Mountain Wing (RMW) Museum is one of 75 local detachments of the national Commemorative Air Force (CAF) non-profit aviation association dedicated to Honoring American Military Aviation through Flight, Exhibit and Remembrance.

The Museum is located at the Grand Junction Regional Airport, Colorado, and contains artifacts and exhibits from World War II, Korean, and Vietnam wars. In addition they operate two aircraft which are part of the CAF's fleet of over 170 vintage warbirds. These two examples happen to be both the largest and smallest of single engine aircraft used by American armed forces during WWII, namely a Grumman TBM Avenger and a Piper J-3 (Army L-4 or Navy NE-1) Grasshopper. Besides offering these as "hands-on" exhibits, the public may also schedule rides as a passenger in these aircraft either at the museum or at airshows where they are also exhibited.

The museum began operation in 1981 with final construction completed in 2000.

== Flying aircraft on display ==
=== TBM Avenger History ===
- TBM Avenger Aircraft N53503
- U.S. National Register of Historic Places
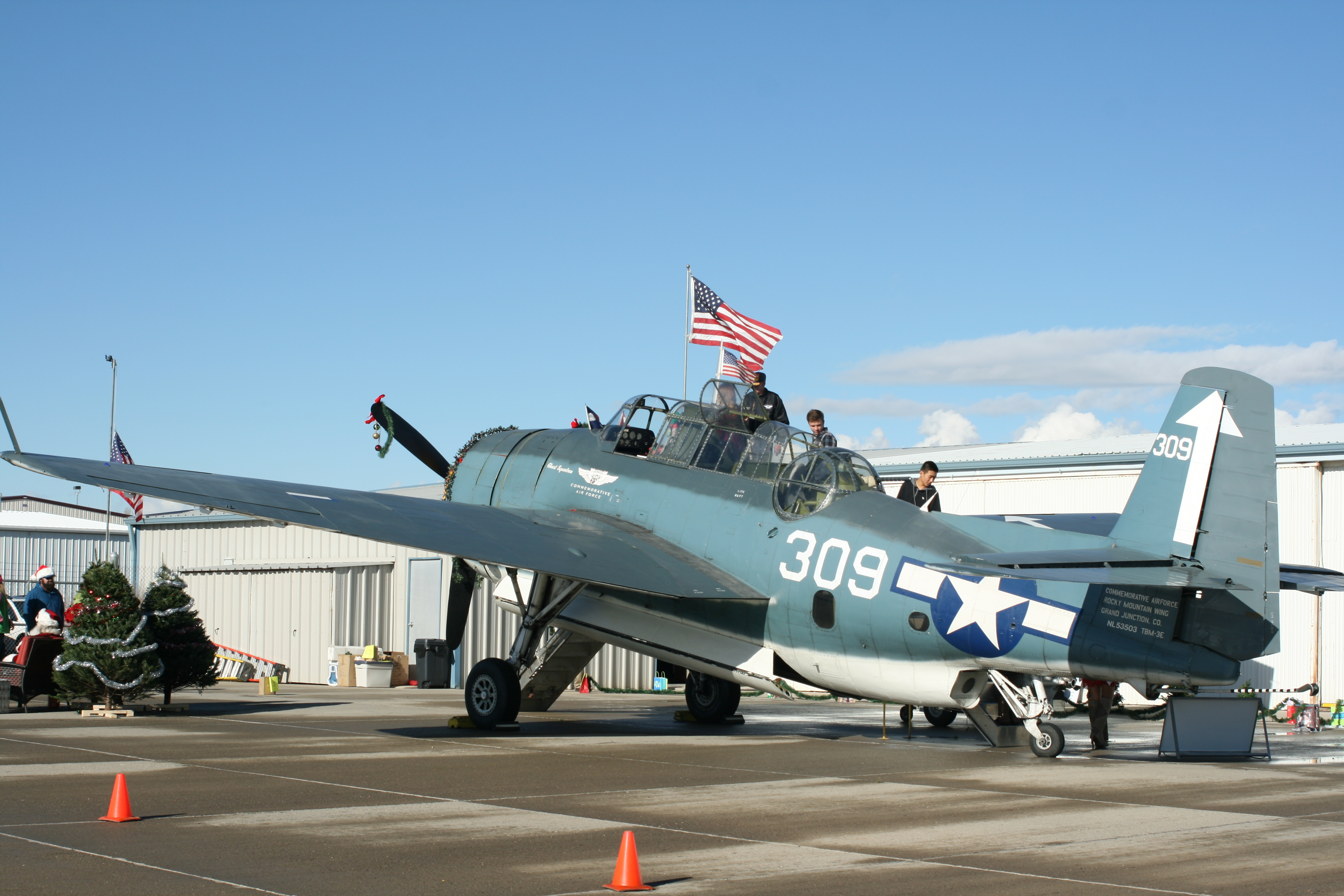
- Location: 780 Heritage Way,, Grand Junction, Colorado
- NRHP reference No.: 100001791
- Added to NRHP: November 13, 2017

TBM Avenger Aircraft N53503 is a Torpedo Bomber M model World War II single engine aircraft in flying condition which was listed on the National Register of Historic Places in 2017. It is 40 feet (12 m) long with 52 feet (16 m) wingspan (with wings folded, 16 feet (4.9 m)).

The original logbooks of the Museum's TBM Avenger BuNo 53503 show that it was accepted by the US Navy on June 1, 1945 at the Norfolk NAS and assigned to the VT-75 Squadron - the "Fish Hawks". It was transferred in 1947 to VT-82 Squadron - the "Devil's Diplomats" and Naval Air Reserve Training at Los Alamitos in southern California.

In 1950 it was lend/leased to the Royal Canadian Navy with only 546 total hours flown. TBM 53503 flew in the RCN 881 Squadron from the carrier HMCS Magnificent (CVL 21) as a sub hunter. After her RCN military career ended in 1958, TBM 53503 was an aerial insecticide applicator from 1963 to 1970 for the Simsbury Flying Service in Simsbury, CT as N6583D. Acquired by the CAF in 1970 where she was painted as VT-10's "white 82" with a tri-color Navy scheme for the CV-10 Yorktown, but still lacked the characteristic dorsal gun turret. She flew with the CAF Ghost Squadron until 1981 in this configuration. During this time, her movie debut can be seen in the first five minutes of the movie Close Encounters of the Third Kind as directed by Steven Spielburg.

From 1981 until 1985, the Avenger sat outside in Arizona waiting for her next duty assignment and in desperate need of repair and maintenance on various systems. On January 17, 1985 TBM 53503 was officially assigned to the CAF Rocky Mountain Wing.

By July 1989, she was once again "ready for duty" - complete with the installation of the dorsal gun turret, and a new paint scheme - that of a TBM assigned to VT-84, also known as the "Wolf Gang" squadron, aboard the USS Bunker Hill (CV-17). This squadron was the first to attack Tokyo on February 16 & 17, 1945 and the colorful yellow cowling was adopted to enhance identification as "friendly" when returning to the fleet from their raid.

=== Piper J-3 Grasshopper ===
This versatile aircraft was first known as the Taylor Cub in 1930. Later as the Piper J-3 Cub it became the most prolific trainer in the world. There were 14,125 civilian built plus 5,703 for military use. The military version was known as "Grasshopper" and had the designation L-4 in the Army Air Corps and NE-1 in the Navy. Beyond basic flight training use the Grasshopper was used for military liaison scouting, coastal patrol and medevac.

== See also ==
- Colorado Aviation Historical Society Denver, CO
- Peterson Air and Space Museum Peterson AFB, Colorado Springs, CO
- Pueblo Weisbrod Aircraft Museum Pueblo Airport, Pueblo, CO
- Spirit of Flight Center Lafayette, CO
- Vintage Aero Flying Museum Platte Valley Airpark, Husdon, CO
- Wings Over the Rockies Air and Space Museum Old Lowry AFB Campus, Denver, CO

Related lists

- List of aerospace museums
