= Malcolm Davies =

Malcolm Davies may refer to:

- Malcolm Davies (classicist)
- Malcolm Davies (rugby)

== See also ==
- Malcolm Davis, American ornithologist
