= Carmela Gutiérrez de Gambra =

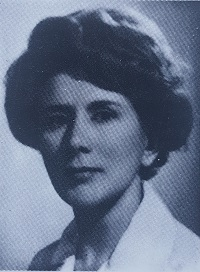
- Born: María del Carmen Gutiérrez Sánchez; 1921
- Died: 31 July 1984 (aged 62–63); Madrid, Spain
- Occupations: scholar; translator; writer; Christian feminist
- Spouse: Rafael Gambra Ciudad
- Children: 3
- Writing career
- Pen name: Miguel Arazuri; André Ronsac; Clara San Miguel; Alice Norton; Enid Colman
- Genre: romance novels

Carmela Gutiérrez de Gambra (née, María del Carmen Gutiérrez Sánchez; 1921 - Madrid, 31 July 1984), was a Spanish scholar, translator, writer, and Christian feminist. Between 1948 and 1971, she was author of more than 40 novels. Most of these were romance novels using the pseudonyms of Miguel Arazuri, André Ronsac, Clara San Miguel, Alice Norton, and Enid Colman. Her husband was the traditionalist teacher, writer and philosopher Rafael Gambra Ciudad.

== Biography ==
María del Carmen Gutiérrez Sánchez was born in 1921. Her nickname was "Carmela", a name with which she even signed some of her translations.

She was a professor of Geography and History at the Ramiro de Maeztu Institute in Madrid, a profession that she combined with her career as a translator of French and English. She was also the author of mainly romantic novels, under the pseudonyms of Miguel Arazuri, André Ronsac, Clara San Miguel, Alice Norton and Enid Colman. She werote some 30 novels, some of them forming part of a wider entity.

Gutierrez was also the founder and manager of Fundación Stella, an independent radio station.

She married Rafael Gambra Ciudad, and the couple had three children, Andrés, José Miguel and Irene, all of them becoming teachers. Of their two sons, Andrés Gambra Gutiérrez is professor of medieval history and the university official, while José Miguel Gambra Gutiérrez is scholar in philosophy, both in Madrid. The two are active Traditionalists, the latter leading the sixtinos Carlists since 2010.

== Selected works ==
=== As Miguel Arazuri ===
- Tesoro escondido (1948)
- Los apuros de Tica (1949)
- El segundo piso (1957)
- La puerta de Adán (1957)
- Irene (1958)
- La rata blanca (1959)
- Para que nunca lo sepas (1959)
- Yo soy el malo (1959)
- Águeda (1960)
- No vale descansar (1960)
- Dale fuego al chaparral (1961)
- El hipócrita (1961)
- Se necesita un culpable (1961)
- Ella, él y cinco millones (1962)
- La mentira (1963)
- Me acuerdo de Ana (1963)
- Todo menos el amor (1963)
- La hechizada (1964)
- La bruja (1965)
- El jardín de las mentiras (1968)
- Rapsodia en miedo (1968)
- La paloma negra (1970)
- La mujer de Roque Bravo (1970)
- El cuarto mandamiento (1971)

==== Marcos series ====
1. Marcos I (1962)
2. Marcos II (1962)

==== El hombre de la boina blanca series ====
1. Dulce Isabel (1964)
2. El bandolero (1964)
3. Estrellas negras (1965)

==== La deuda series ====
1. Nieves (1965)
2. Claudia (1965)
3. Alba (1965)

==== El hijo de Juan Osorio series ====
1. El hijo de Juan Osorio. Tomo I (1967)
2. El hijo de Juan Osorio. Tomo II (1967)

=== As André Ronsac ===
- 3 llamadas telefónicas (1953)
- Con alma prestada (1954)
- Aunque duela… (1956)
- Amor a primera vista (1961)

=== As Clara San Miguel ===
- ¡Quiero ser guapa…! (1964)
- La segunda novia (1964)

=== As Alice Norton ===
- Mi corazón como cebo (1964)

=== As Enid Coleman ===
- Piel de pantera (1966)
