= Charles H. Kahn =

American philosopher and classicist (1928–2023)

Charles H. Kahn (May 29, 1928 – March 5, 2023) was a classicist and professor emeritus of philosophy at the University of Pennsylvania. His work focused on early Greek philosophy, up to the times of Plato. His 1960 monograph on Anaximander was still as of 2020 the most important reference work on the subject, and his 1979 edition of the Heraclitus fragments likewise remained the most widely cited English translation of Heraclitus, more or less representing the standard interpretation of that work.

== Work ==
Charles H. Kahn presented in 1965 to the Society for Ancient Greek Philosophy at its meeting with the Eastern Division of the American Philosophical Association a notable work under the title “The Greek Verb ‘To Be’ and the Problem of Being”. It was printed the following year in Foundations of Language. and became the topic of a book published in 1973 and reprinted later. He also wrote historical studies on Anaximander and the Pythagoreans. A collection of his various essays has been published by the Oxford University Press in 2009.

=== Reflections ===
In Greek philosophy, Kahn identified predication as one of the three concepts - along with truth and reality - that ontology connected. His work on Why Existence does not Emerge as a Distinct Concept in Greek Philosophy is remarked 24 years after its appearance by Allan Back in his book on Aristotle's Theory of Predication. Kahn sees that Aristotle does not isolate existence as a separate topic or as a "central and implicit theme" of his philosophy. Aristotle, says Kahn, starts "from the reality of the world." For Back, Kahn treats as anachronism any distinction of "the 'is' of predication" from "the 'is' of existence".

In terms of the nature of Being, Kahn maintains that notions in the contemporary analytical philosophy appear to form a heterogeneous bundle with no focal concept of "be" to hold them together. On the other hand, he cited medieval philosophy for its introduction of interrelated conceptions of existence and creation, which established a particular view, which involved a superadding of a matter to a form instead of further forming or reforming a matter that already stands in relation to a form.

Kahn's work on Plato and the Socratic Dialogue presents the Platonic dialogues as collectively constituting a meaningful philosophical program. He argued for psychagogia (leading of the soul) to conduct the reader from one dialogue to another.

== Awards ==
Kahn has twice been the recipient of an award by the American Council of Learned Societies and twice been the recipient of an award by the National Endowment for the Humanities.

Kahn won a Guggenheim Foundation award in 1979/80 and in 2000 he was elected Fellow of the American Academy of Arts and Sciences.

In 2009, Kahn was feted with a Festschrift, the collected papers of which were gathered into a celebratory volume of this author of whom it is said that "in these subject areas (Presocratics and Plato) that the distinction of his scholarship has come to be regarded as virtually unrivaled".

In 2014, Kahn was the inaugural winner of the Werner Jaeger Award, given by the German Gesellschaft für antike Philosophie.

== See also ==
- Sisyphus fragment

== Bibliography ==
- Kahn, Charles H. (1960). Anaximander and the Origins of Greek Cosmology. Hackett.
- Kahn, Charles H. (1973). The verb "be" in ancient Greek. Hackett. (Rev. 2nd ed. in 2003)
- Kahn, Charles H. (1979). The Art and Thought of Heraclitus: An Edition of the Fragments with Translation and Commentary. Cambridge: Cambridge University Press.
- Kahn, Charles H. (1996). Plato and the Socratic Dialogue: The Philosophical Use of a Literary Form. Cambridge University Press.
- Kahn, Charles H. (2001). Pythagoras and the Pythagoreans: A Brief History. Hackett.
- Kahn, Charles H. (2009). Essays on Being. Oxford University Press.
- Kahn, Charles H. (2013). Plato and the Post-Socratic Dialogue. Cambridge University Press.
