= Sisyphus fragment =

Historical fragment of Greek verse

The Sisyphus fragment is a fragment from Classical Attic drama which is thought to contain an early argument for atheism, claiming that a clever man invented "the fear of the gods" in order to frighten people into behaving morally.

The fragment was preserved in the works of the Pyrrhonist philosopher Sextus Empiricus. In antiquity, its authorship was disputed and is attributed in one tradition to Euripides, in another Critias, but the fragment indicates clear intellectual influences that are less under dispute. This includes the thought of Democritus, as Charles H. Kahn has argued. Like the Sisyphus fragment, Democritus wrote that early humans believed in the gods through fear of natural celestial phenomena:

And there are some who have supposed that we have arrived at the conception of Gods from those events in the world which are marvelous; which opinion seems to have been held by Democritus, who says—“For when the men of old time beheld the disasters in the heavens, such as thunderings and lightnings, and thunderbolts and collisions between stars, and eclipses of sun and moon, they were affrighted, imagining the Gods to be the causes of these things.”

== Text ==
The Greek text is conserved in Sextus Empiricus Against the Physicists Book 1 Section 54 (Note: Greek text. ἦν χρόνος ὅτ᾽ ἦν ἄτακτος ἀνθρώπων βίος καὶ θηριώδης ἰσχύος θ᾽ ὑπηρέτης, ὅτ᾽ οὐδὲν ἆθλον οὔτε τοῖς ἐσθλοῖσιν ἦν οὔτ᾽ αὖ κόλασμα τοῖς κακοῖς ἐγίγνετο. κἄπειτά μοι δοκοῦσιν ἅνθρωποι νόμους 5 θέσθαι κολαστάς, ἵνα δίκη τύραννος ᾖ <x_ᴗ_x> τήν θ᾽ ὕβριν δούλην ἔχῃ· ἐζημιοῦτο δ᾽ εἴ τις ἐξαμαρτάνοι. ἔπειτ᾽ ἐπειδὴ τἀμφανῆ μὲν οἱ νόμοι ἀπεῖργον αὐτοὺς ἔργα μὴ πράσσειν βίᾳ, 10 λάθρᾳ δ᾽ ἔπρασσον, τηνικαῦτά μοι δοκεῖ <πρῶτον> πυκνός τις καὶ σοφὸς γνώμην ἀνήρ <θεῶν> δέος θνητοῖσιν ἐξευρεῖν, ὅπως εἴη τι δεῖμα τοῖς κακοῖσι, κἂν λάθρᾳ πράσσωσιν ἢ λέγωσιν ἢ φρονῶσί <τι>. 15 ἐντεῦθεν οὖν τὸ θεῖον εἰσηγήσατο, ὡς ἔστι δαίμων ἀφθίτῳ θάλλων βίῳ νόῳ τ᾽ ἀκούων καὶ βλέπων, φρονῶν τε καὶ προσέχων τε ταῦτα καὶ φύσιν θείαν φορῶν, ὃς πᾶν {μὲν} τὸ λεχθὲν ἐν βροτοῖς ἀκού<σ>εται, 20 <τὸ> δρώμενον δὲ πᾶν ἰδεῖν δυνήσεται. ἐὰν δὲ σὺν σιγῇ τι βουλεύῃς κακόν, τοῦτ᾽ οὐχὶ λήσει τοὺς θεούς· τὸ γὰρ φρονοῦν ἔνεστι. τ<οισύτ>ους δε τοὺς λόγους λέγων διδαγμάτων ἥδιστον εἰσηγήσατο 25 ψευδεῖ καλύψας τὴν ἀλήθειαν λόγῳ. <ν>αίει<ν> δ᾽ ἔφασκε τοὺς θεοὺς ἐνταῦθ᾽ ἵνα μάλιστ᾽ἂ<ν>1 ἐξέπληξεν ἀνθρώπους ἄγων, ὅθεν περ ἔγνω τοὺς φόβους ὄντας βροτοῖς καὶ τὰς ὀνήσεις τῷ ταλαιπώρῳ βίῳ, 30 ἐκ τῆς ὕπερθε περιφορᾶς, ἵν᾽ ἀστραπάς κατεῖδον οὔσας, δεινὰ δὲ κτυπήματα βροντῆς τό τ᾽ ἀστερωπὸν οὐρανοῦ δέμας, Χρόνου καλὸν ποίκιλμα, τέκτονος σοφοῦ, ὅθεν τε λαμπρὸς ἀστέρος στείχει μύδρος 35 ὅ θ᾽ ὑγρὸς εἰς γῆν ὄμβρος ἐκπορεύεται. τοίους πέριξ ἔστησεν ἀνθρώποις φόβους, δι᾽ οὓς καλῶς τε τῷ λόγῳ κατῴκισεν τὸν δαίμον᾽ οὗτος ἐν πρέποντι χωρίῳ, τὴν ἀνομίαν τε τοῖς νόμοις κατέσβεσεν 40 … οὕτω δὲ πρῶτον οἴομαι πεῖσαί τινα θνητοὺς νομίζειν δαιμόνων εἶναι γένος.)

Several English versions exist. That by R. G. Bury runs:-

A time there was when anarchy did rule
The lives of men, which then were like the beasts,
Enslaved by force; nor was there then reward
For good men, nor for wicked punishment.
Next, as I deem, did men establish laws
For punishment, that Justice might be lord
Of all mankind, and Insolence enchain'd;
And whosoe'r did sin was penalized.
Next, as the laws did hold men back from deeds
Of open violence, but still such deeds
Were done in secret,—then, as I maintain,
Some shrewd man first, a man in counsel wise,
Discovered unto men the fear of Gods,
Thereby to frighten sinners should they sin
E'en secretly in deed, or word, or thought.
Hence was it that he brought in Deity
Telling how God enjoys an endless life,
Hears with his mind and sees, and taketh thought
And heeds things, and his nature is divine,
So that he hearkens to men's every word
And has the power to see men's every act.
E'en if you plan in silence some ill deed,
The Gods will surely mark it; for in them
Wisdom resides. So, speaking words like these
Most cunning doctrine did he introduce,
The truth concealing under speech untrue.
The place he spoke of as the God's abode
Was that whereby he could affright men most,—
The place from which, he knew, both terrors came
And easements unto men of toilsome life—
To wit the vault above, wherein do dwell
The lightnings, he beheld, and awesome claps
Of thunder, and the starry face of heaven,
Fair-spangled by that cunning craftsman Time,—
Whence, too, the meteor's glowing mass doth speed
And liquid rain descends upon the earth.
Such were the fears wherewith he hedged men round,
And so to God he gave a fitting home,
By this his speech, and in a fitting place,
And thus extinguished lawlessness by laws.

And, after proceeding a little further, he adds—

Thus first did some man, as I deem, persuade
Men to suppose the race of Gods exists.

== Authorship ==
The authorship of the fragment, which survives in the writings of Sextus Empiricus, is vigorously debated. Modern classical scholarship accepted the attribution to Critias on the basis of a hypothesis first advanced by Ulrich von Wilamowitz-Moellendorff in 1875, and thereafter Hermann Diels, Johann August Nauck, and Bruno Snell, endorsed this ascription for which there is but one source in antiquity. In 1977, Albrecht Dihle in a major paper challenged this ascription and assigned the work to Euripides, arguing that the fragment comes from the latter's satyr play of this name, produced in 415 BCE. Since Dihle published his article, the authorship of the fragment has divided modern scholars. Scholars that advocate Euripidean authorship include Charles H. Kahn, Ruth Scodel, Martin Ostwald, Jan Bremmer and Harvey Yunis. However, Critias authorship was argued by Walter Burkert, (Note: Apropos Dihle's proposal he writes that Dihle 'overlooks the testimony of Epicurus 27.2.8.') and other scholars that advocate for the same authorship include Dana Sutton, Marek Winiarczyk, Malcolm Davies, Dirk Obbink, Tim Whitmarsh and Martin Cropp.

One source in antiquity ascribed the passage to Critias, one of the thirty oligarchs who ruled Athens in the immediate aftermath of the city-state's defeat in the Peloponesian War: two attribute it, or lines in it, to Euripides. Sextus Empiricus assigned these verses to Critias without however indicating which of his works. Both the Stoic logician Chrysippus and the doxographer Aëtius cited Euripides as the author, specifying that it was taken from that author's lost play Sisyphus. In modern times, Wilamowitz came down strongly for the view that it was written by Critias, a disciple of Socrates, and dated it, as forming the coda of a tetralogy, following three tragedies by Critias -Peirithous, Rhadumunthus and Tennes -, which he argued was written sometime after his return from exile in 411. The view that it was written by Euripides frequently identifies it as belonging to the Sisyphus, the satyr play capping his 415 trilogy: Alexandros, Palamedes and The Trojan Women, though Jan N. Bremmer suggests another lost play by Euripides; his Autolykos would be a more attractive candidate as the original source.

A major issue in discussing authorship of the passage hinges on the question whether the speaker's views reflect those of a historic atheist, or whether the lines are simply a dramatic mise en scène of an atheistic outlook, and therefore not one entertained by its author. Dihle argued that there was no evidence in the surviving fragments of Kritias that he was an atheist, except for the testimony of Sextus Empiricus and Plutarch, a point Burkert challenged in the revised English version of his book on Greek Religion by citing the testimony of a fragment of Epicurus from Bk.11 of his work On Nature.

== Style ==
The fragment is composed of 42 iambic trimeters. The topic concerns the mythical figure of Sisyphus. Style plays an important function in the authorship question: if we take it as expressing the view of the sophist Critias, the cynical deconstruction of religion would appear to harmonize perfectly with the character of that historical person, – 'that brilliant but sinister figure in the politics and letters of the end of the fifth century' – who gained a reputation for ruthless unscrupulousness. But were it to pertain to the genre of the satyr play, then we would not expect a straightforward exposition of a theory but rather a parody of it, a tone lacking in the surviving fragment.

== Interpretations ==
W. K. C. Guthrie stated that the Sisyphus fragment is 'the first occurrence in history of the theory of religion as a political invention to ensure good behaviour,' an approach which was subsequently adopted by the Hellenistic historian Polybius in his 40 volume history of Rome's emergence as an empire. Karl Popper in his The Open Society and its Enemies noted a 'striking' similarity between the passage ascribed to Critias, and the views Plato, Critias's nephew, developed in his two dialogues, the Republic and the Laws regarding the Noble lie.

== Sources ==
- Bremmer, Jan N. (2006). "Atheism in Antiquity". In Martin, Michael (ed.). The Cambridge Companion to Atheism. Cambridge University Press. pp. 11–26. ISBN 978-1-139-00118-2.
- Burkert, Walter (1985). Greek Religion: Archaic and Classical. Harvard University Press. ISBN 978-0-674-36281-9.
- Collard, Christopher; Cropp, Martin, eds. (2009). Euripides. Fragments: Oedipus-Chrysippus. Other Fragments. Loeb Classical Library. Vol. 506. Harvard University Press. pp. 670–678.
- Cropp, Martin (2020). Lamari, A.; Montanari, F. (eds.). Fragmentation in Ancient Greek Drama. De Gruyter. pp. 235–256.
- Davies, Malcolm (1989). "Sisyphus and the invention of religion ('Critias' TrGF 1 (43) F 19 = B 25 DK)". Bulletin of the Institute of Classical Studies. 36 (36): 16–32. doi:10.1111/j.2041-5370.1989.tb00560.x. JSTOR 43693889.
- Dihle, Albrecht (1977). "Das Satyrspiel "Sisyphos"". Hermes. 105 (1): 28–42. JSTOR 4475993.
- Guthrie, W. K. C. (1969). A History of Greek Philosophy. Vol. 3. Cambridge University Press.
- Kahn, Charles H. (1997). "Greek Religion and Philosophy in the Sisyphus Fragment". Phronesis. 42 (3): 247–262. doi:10.1163/15685289760518153. JSTOR 4182561.
- Lovejoy, Arthur Oncken; Boas, George (1935). Primitivism and Related Ideas in Antiquity. Vol. 1 (2nd ed.). Octagon Books.
- Miller, James F.; Woodruff, Paul B.. (2000). "Introduction". In Miller, James F.; Woodruff, Paul B. (eds.). Reason and Religion in Socratic Philosophy. Oxford University Press. pp. 3–11. ISBN 978-0-195-13322-6.
- Popper, Karl (1966) [First published 1945]. The Open Society and Its Enemies: The Spell of Plato. Vol. 1 (5th ed.). Routledge.
- Sextus Empiricus (1936). Bury, R. G. (ed.). Sextus Empiricus. Vol. 3. Harvard University Press William Heinemann.
- Whitmarsh, Tim (2014). "Atheistic Aesthetics: The Sisyphus Fragment, Poetics and the Creativity of Drama". Proceedings of the Cambridge Philological Society. 60: 109–126.
- Wilamowitz-Moellendorff, Ulrich von (1875). Analecta Euripidea. Borntraeger.
