= Rafael Gambra Ciudad =

Spanish philosopher (1920–2004)

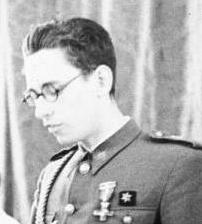
- Gambra in 1939
- Born: 21 July 1920; Madrid, Spain
- Died: 13 January 2004 (aged 83); Madrid, Spain

Philosophical work
- Era: 20th-century philosophy
- Region: Western philosophy: Spanish philosophy
- School: Carlism; Traditionalism
- Main interests: Political philosophy

Rafael Gambra Ciudad (21 July 1920 – 13 January 2004) was a Spanish philosopher, a secondary education official, a Carlist politician and a soldier. In philosophy he is considered key representative of late Traditionalism; his works fall also into theory of state and politics. He is best known as author of books focusing on secularisation of Western European culture in the consumer society era. As a politician he is acknowledged as a theorist rather than as an active protagonist, though after 2001 he briefly headed one of the Carlist branches.

== Family and youth ==
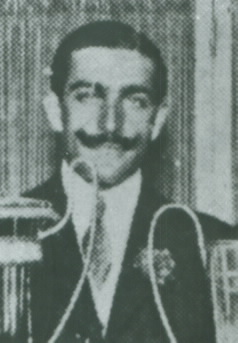
José Ciudad, maternal grandfather

Rafael's paternal ancestors for generations have been related to Valle de Roncal; until today Casa Gambra and Casa Sanz are iconic mansions of the area. The Gambras made their name fighting the French in 1809. Rafael's grandfather, Pedro Francisco Gambra Barrena (died 1930), married descendant to a distinguished Carlist military Sanz family; himself he rose to high positions in Ministry of Economy. His son and Rafael's father, Eduardo Gambra Sanz (1878-1964), became an architect. Key Gambra's works are offices of Sociedad Gran Peña along the Gran Vía and refurbishment of Palacio del Marqués de Miraflores, marked by attempt to re-capture the splendor of historical Spanish architecture. In 1915 he married Rafaela Ciudad Villalón (died 1947), born in Seville though raised in Madrid. She came from a distinguished family of civil servants; her father José Ciudad Aurioles in the early 20th century was a Cortes deputy, until the early 1920s a longtime senator, and in 1917-1923 served as President of Tribunal Supremo. The couple had only one child.

Born and raised in Madrid, Rafael spent much of his childhood in Valle de Roncal and later cherished his Navarrese heritage; in historiography he is referred to as a navarro rather than as a madrileño, sometimes dubbed "maestro navarro", "arquetipo navarro", "buen navarro" or "vasco-navarro roncalés". He was brought up in profoundly Catholic ambience; politically his father sympathized with Carlism and his mother, though coming from a Liberal family, also displayed a conservative penchant. He was first educated at the Madrid Marianist Colegio del Pilar; already during his schoolboy years he was attracted to letters and read books while his colleagues played football; during his early adolescent years he was engaged in Asociación Católica Nacional de Propagandistas.

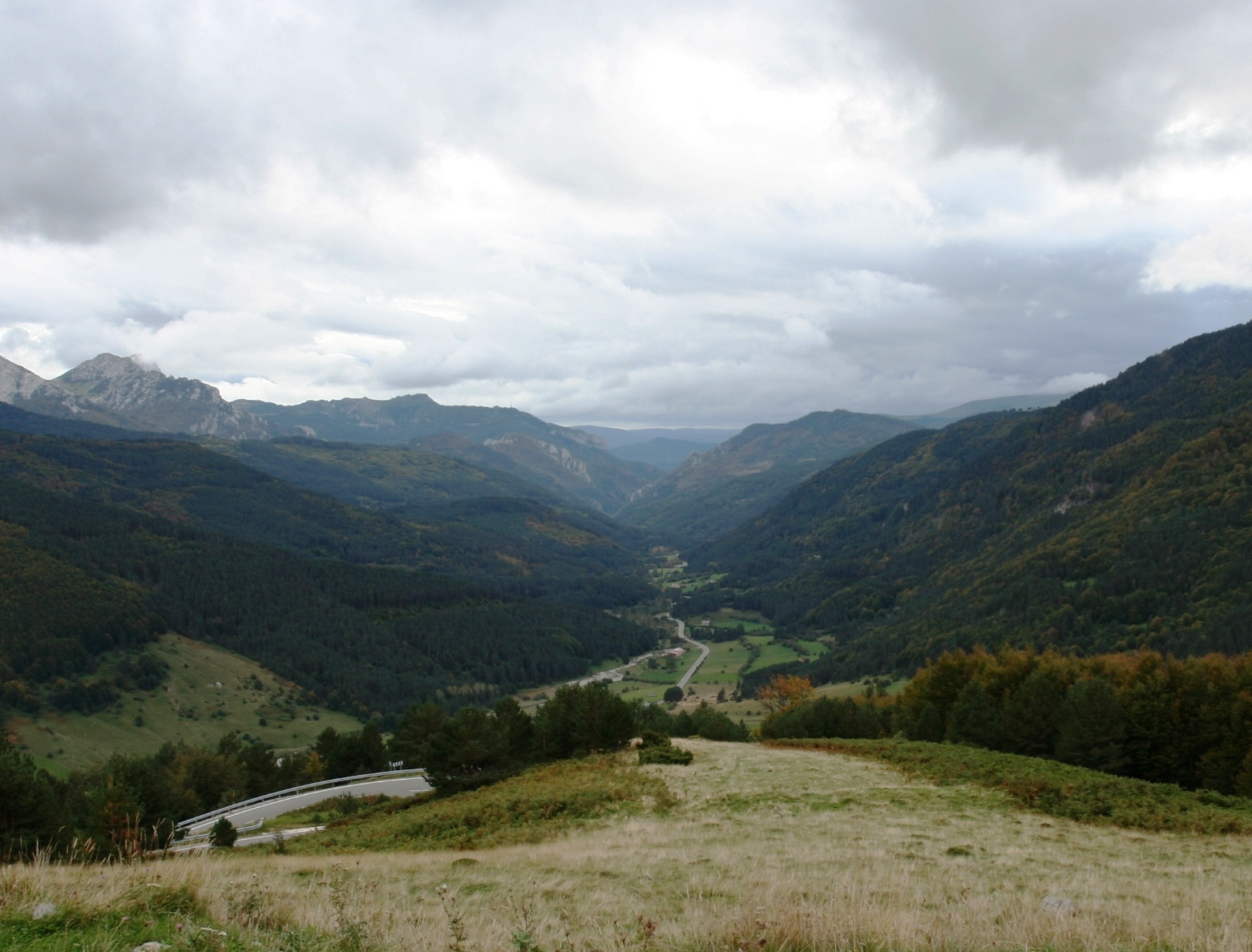
Valle de Roncal, view from upper part of the Belagua section

In July 1936 the Gambras were spending their summer holidays in Roncal, where they were caught by the military coup. As a 16-year-old Rafael volunteered to the Requeté unit of Tercio de Abárzurza, in few days time taking positions at Alto de León pass and attempting to break through Sierra de Guadarrama. José Ulíbarri, the Catholic parish priest from Úgar and temporary commander of the unit, remained Gambra's friend and sort of mentor for life. He spent the next 2 years at the stationary frontline in the Sierra, until in July 1938 he left to attend alférez provisional training. In February 1939 he was seconded to Tercio del Alcázar, commanding a platoon in the 4. Infantry Company. Having reached Lliria at the moment of Nationalist victory, he was decorated with many military awards.

Rafael Gambra was married to María del Carmen Gutiérrez Sánchez (1921-1984), translator, scholar and as Miguel Arazuri author of fairly popular novels. She was also the founder and manager of Fundación Stella, an independent radio venture. The couple had three children. Of their two sons, Andrés Gambra Gutiérrez is professor of medieval history and the university official, while José Miguel Gambra Gutiérrez is scholar in philosophy, both in Madrid. The two are active Traditionalists, the latter leading the sixtinos Carlists since 2010.

== Scholarship ==
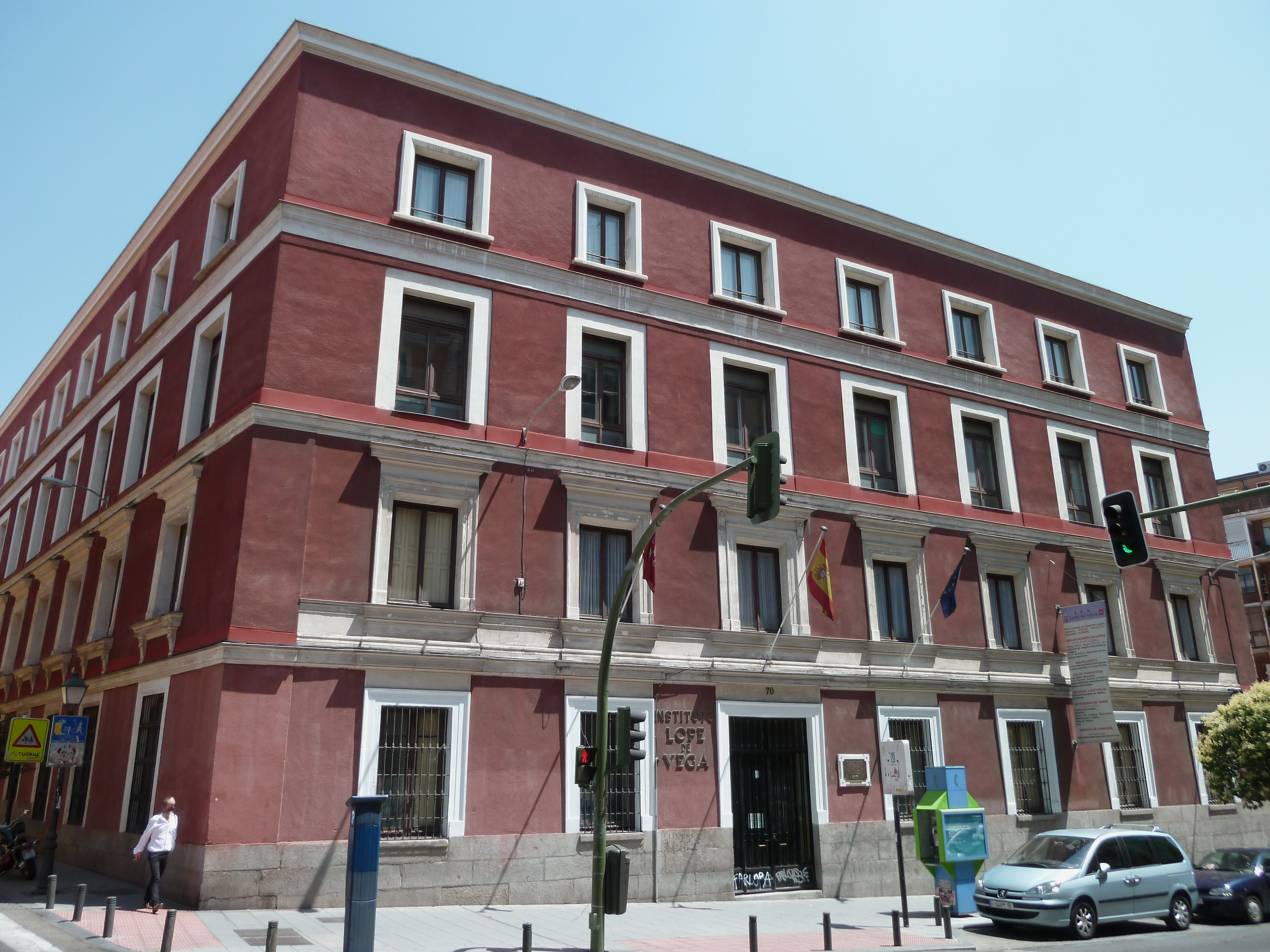
Instituto Lope de Vega, Madrid

In 1939 Gambra enrolled at the faculty of letters and philosophy at Universidad Central. Influenced by Manuel García Morente and Salvador Minguijón Adrián, he graduated in 1942. One year later he entered Cuerpo de Catedráticos Numerarios de Institutos Nacionales de Enseñanza Media. Promoted to Inspector Nacional de Enseñanzas Medias, in 1945 Gambra obtained his PhD laurels as Doctor en Filosofía, his thesis dedicated to post-Hegelian approach to historiographic methodology. The work, promoted by Juan Zaragüeta y Bengoechea, boiled down to highly critical review centred on Marx and Feuerbach and was published in 1946.

Already in the early 1940s Gambra assumed teaching at the Madrid Academia Vazquez de Mella, a semi-official Carlist educational and cultural enterprise; he was giving lectures on Traditionalist theory of philosophy, state and politics. In 1943 he moved to Pamplona, where he was employed by Instituto Príncipe de Viana, a cultural outpost of Carlism managed by the provincial authorities. During the next 12 years Gambra served in the Institute as professor of philosophy, in the early 1950s apparently hoping to join a would-be Universidad del País Vasco-Navarro, a high-education establishment advocated at the time. However, when Universidad de Navarra materialized as a private Opus Dei enterprise in 1952, Gambra did not enlist; he rejected also an opportunity to pursue research and possibly scholarship in England. In the mid-1950s he returned to the capital, engaged in governmental attempt to re-shape the secondary education structures. He assumed teaching in newly created "centros modelos de segunda enseñanza", first in Instituto Miguel de Cervantes and in the mid-1960s moving to Instituto Nacional de Enseñanza Media Lope de Vega, becoming its vicedirector later on. As education official he was anxious to prevent "erosión de la espiritualidad", and in the early 1960s he opposed technocratic changes, proposed and eventually introduced in education. He co-operated also with Universidad Complutense, particularly with the associated San Pablo CEU college, run by ACdP. Gambra continued collaborating with CEU from the mid-1960s to 1994, also after San Pablo had formally separated from Complutense and became an independent university.

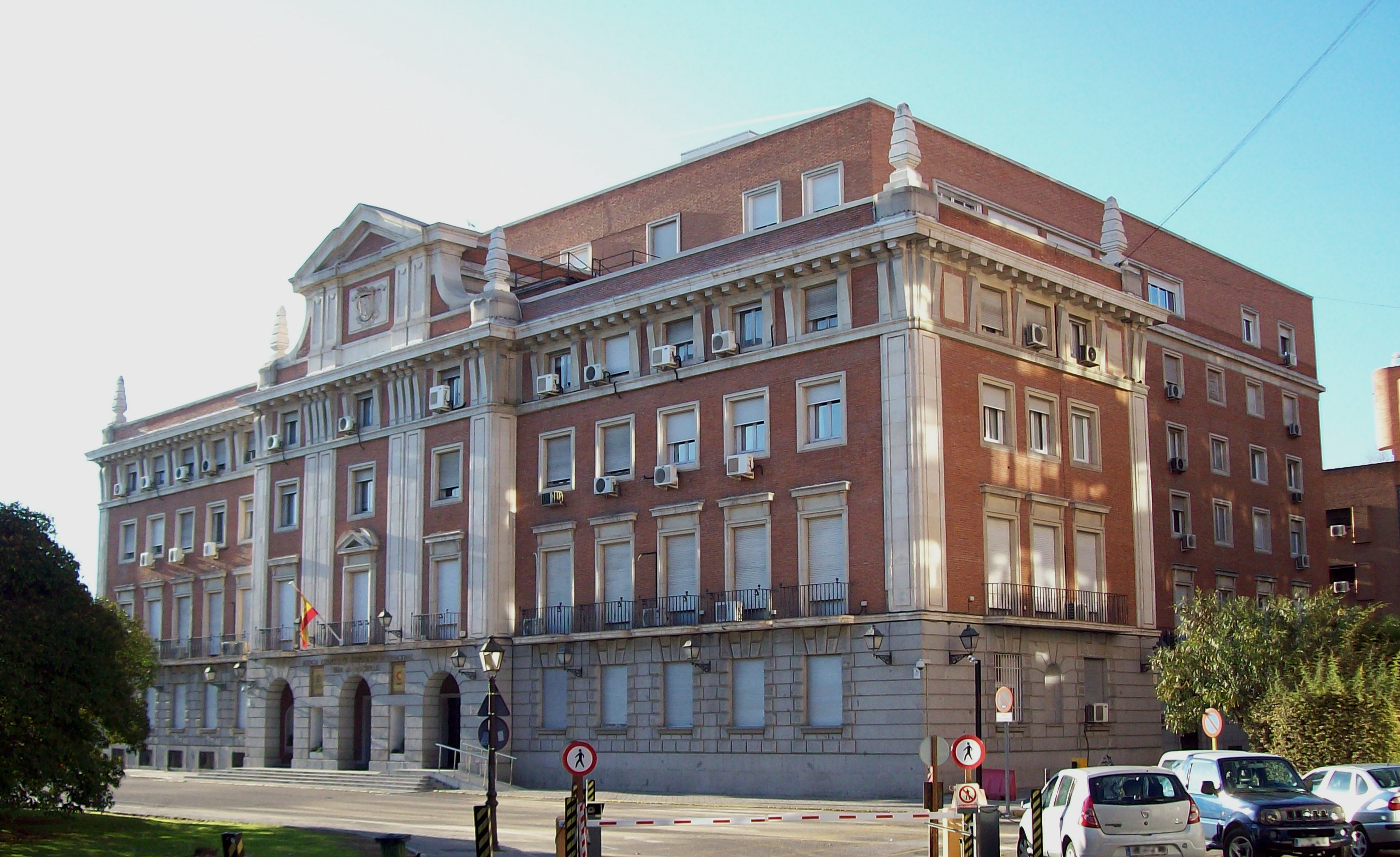
Instituto de Cultura Hispánica

Apart from professional engagements, Gambra continued his teaching career also with a number of semi-scholarly institutions. Until the early 1960s Gambra was giving lectures at Ateneo de Madrid, at that time led by Florentino Pérez Embid, and Instituto de Cultura Hispánica, an establishment created by Francoist authorities to cultivate the Latin American link. In the press referred to as "catedrático", he was active in once-off conferences, also beyond Madrid, and in periodical Catholic cultural-scientific initiatives, like Conversaciones Intelectuales de El Paular or sessions organized by Hermandad Sacerdotal. In the mid-1960s he commenced engagement in Madrid-based Centro de Estudios Históricos y Políticos General Zumalacárregui, a think-tank set up to disseminate Traditionalist thought and counter progressist designs on Carlism. In the late 1960s he stood as a recognized authority, at least within the Traditionalist realm. He continued giving lectures in the 1980s, as late as 1989 and 1992. In 1998 he celebrated 50 years of teaching.

== Thought ==
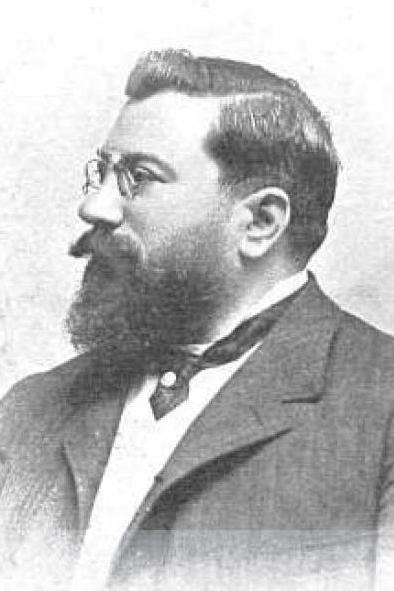
Juan Vázquez de Mella

In terms of general inspiration Gambra is broadly defined as fitting within the Platonic tradition but indebted mostly to St. Thomas Aquinas and occasionally referred to as member of the neo-scholastic school. His views on Christianity were influenced by Gustave Thibon, Etienne Gilson, Romano Guardini and partially Max Scheler. He is also often referred to as embracing philosophic threads of Albert Camus and other French existentialists, while in theory of politics and state following Alexis de Tocqueville, Karl von Vogelsang and especially Juan Vázquez de Mella.

The principal thread of Gambra's thought is repudiation of rationalism-based civilization and promotion of a Traditionalist outlook. Human life is understood as commitment to divine order and human identity as spanned between own self and community belonging. A man is perceived primarily as a social – not autonomous – being, expressed mostly by his role in society; similarly, life is about contributing to common good, incompatible with individualism or liberalism. The society itself is governed by nature, animality and rationality, though religion as a transcendent factor is indispensable element of social equation. Such a polity is best expressed as a "society of duties", united by common purpose and religious inspiration. As he believed a public organization not based on accepted orthodoxy can never be stable, leading to mere co-existence rather than community, Gambra advocated public embracement of the doctrine with respect for privately held heterodoxy.

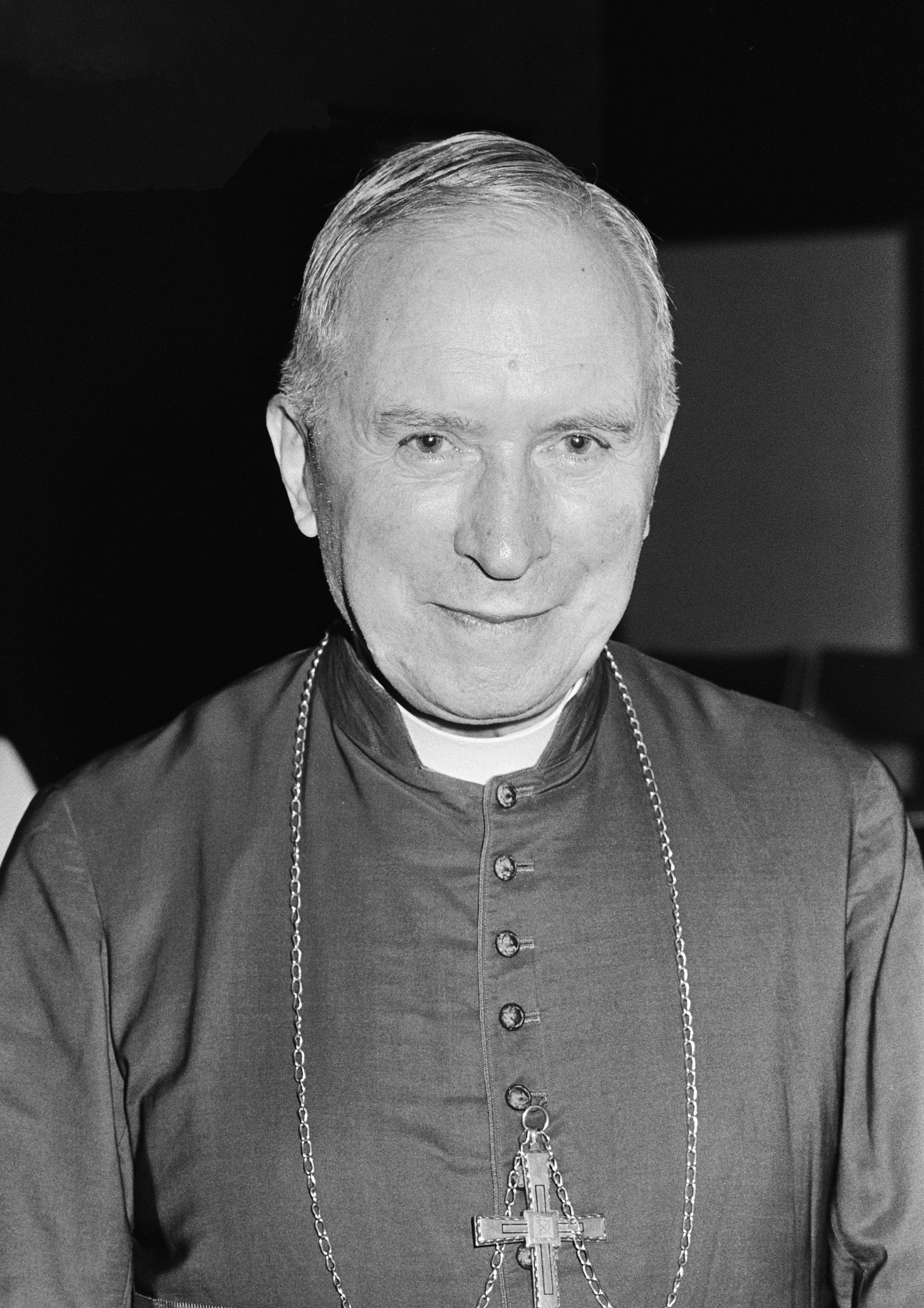
Marcel Lefebvre C.S.Sp., picture from 1981

According to Gambra social self of a human is best expressed by tradition, viewed as accumulated and irreversible evolution that provides a principle governing historical societies and incompatible with revolutionary patterns of change. In case of Spain the tradition is embodied in hereditary monarchy as opposed to elective heads of state, federative structure as opposed to unitary nation states, organic representation as opposed to corruption-prone and individual-centred parliamentarian democracy, Catholic orthodoxy as opposed to secular or neutral regime and generally withdrawn admin structures as opposed to modern, omnipotent state. Politically the guardian of such a tradition was Carlism, not merely political grouping or romantic sentiment but rather the very essence of Spanish self.

Recurring thread of Gambra's thought, by some considered its key component, was confronting modern format of religiosity. He held Maritain and Teilhard de Chardin responsible for undermining Christianity and turning it into a "new humanist religion", admitting defeat in 150-year-old struggle against secular Revolution. Fiercely critical of Vaticanum II he considered Dignitatis humanae incompatible with tradition, the innovative effort of Vatican producing demolition of Christianity and reduction of Catholic integrity to mere "Christian inspiration". Indeed, he is often referred to as an Integrist. Faced with progressist stance of the Church, Gambra started assuming anti-clerical positions from the far-right perspective. He often combined his critique with onslaught on European idea, considered a euphemism denoting a militant, anti-Christian ideology, and opposed its implementation in Spain. He was not that much anti-democratic as rather opposing deification of democracy, and especially the central if not exclusive position it claimed within public space.

== Works ==
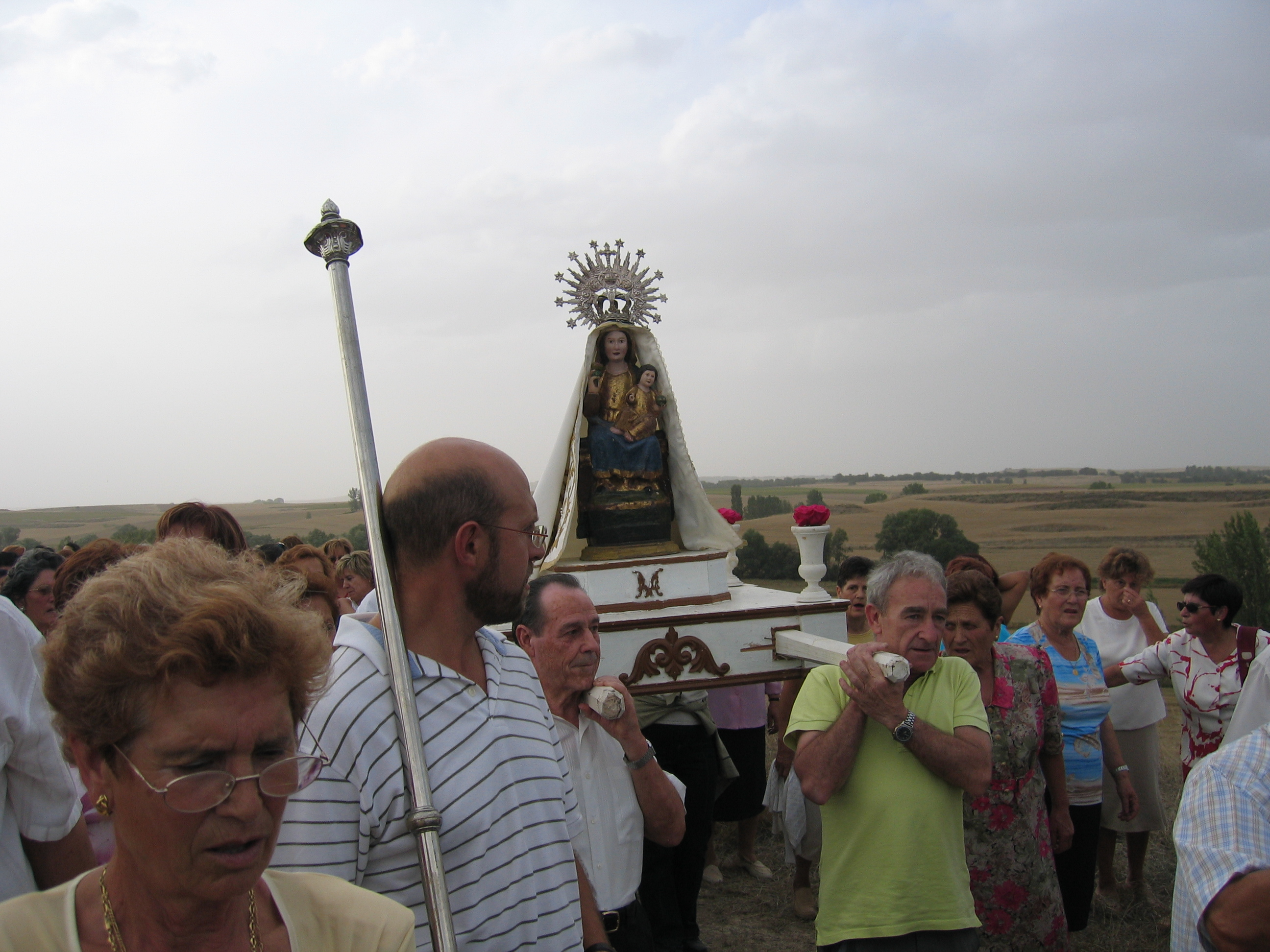
Romería, Spain

Most popular Gambra's works were textbooks in history of philosophy: Historia sencilla de la filosofía (1961) and Curso elemental de filosofía (1962); tailored for the beginners, they were reprinted in countless editions and served as immensely popular introductions to philosophy for generations of Spanish students until the early 21st century. The first edition of Curso was nominally co-authored by Gustavo Bueno; in the subsequent re-runs the publisher dropped Bueno, who after the fall of Francoism claimed that the result of his own labor had been merely re-edited by Gambra. In 1970 these works were supplemented by La filosofía católica en el siglo XX.

Gambra's view on theory of society and state was laid out in three works: his PhD dissertation La interpretación materialista de la historia (1946), La monarquía social y representativa en el pensamiento tradicional (1954) and Eso que llaman estado (1958). La monarquía, together with almost simultaneously published similar work of Elías de Tejada, became a cornerstone of Traditionalist theoretical vision, while Eso que llaman was widely discussed in the press of the era; both earned Gambra prestigious standing in scholarly discourse.

The works which made most impact among the wide public were 4 books focusing on contemporary culture: La unidad religiosa y el derrotismo católico (1965), El silencio de Dios (1967), Tradición o mimetismo (1976) and El lenguaje y los mitos (1983). The first two centred on secularization of Western polities; they confronted Christian-Democratic vision and Vatican II alike, explored roots of perceived cultural decline, tried to re-define tradition versus progress and strove to demonstrate how multifold advances of the last centuries have given man a false sense of mastery. Tradición turned dramatically out of tune with the transición spirit, withdrawn by the editor and distributed by the author himself. Finally, El lenguaje deconstructed modern communication; its objective was to prove that the progressist tide manipulated the language and turned it from means of communication into means of promoting cultural revolution.

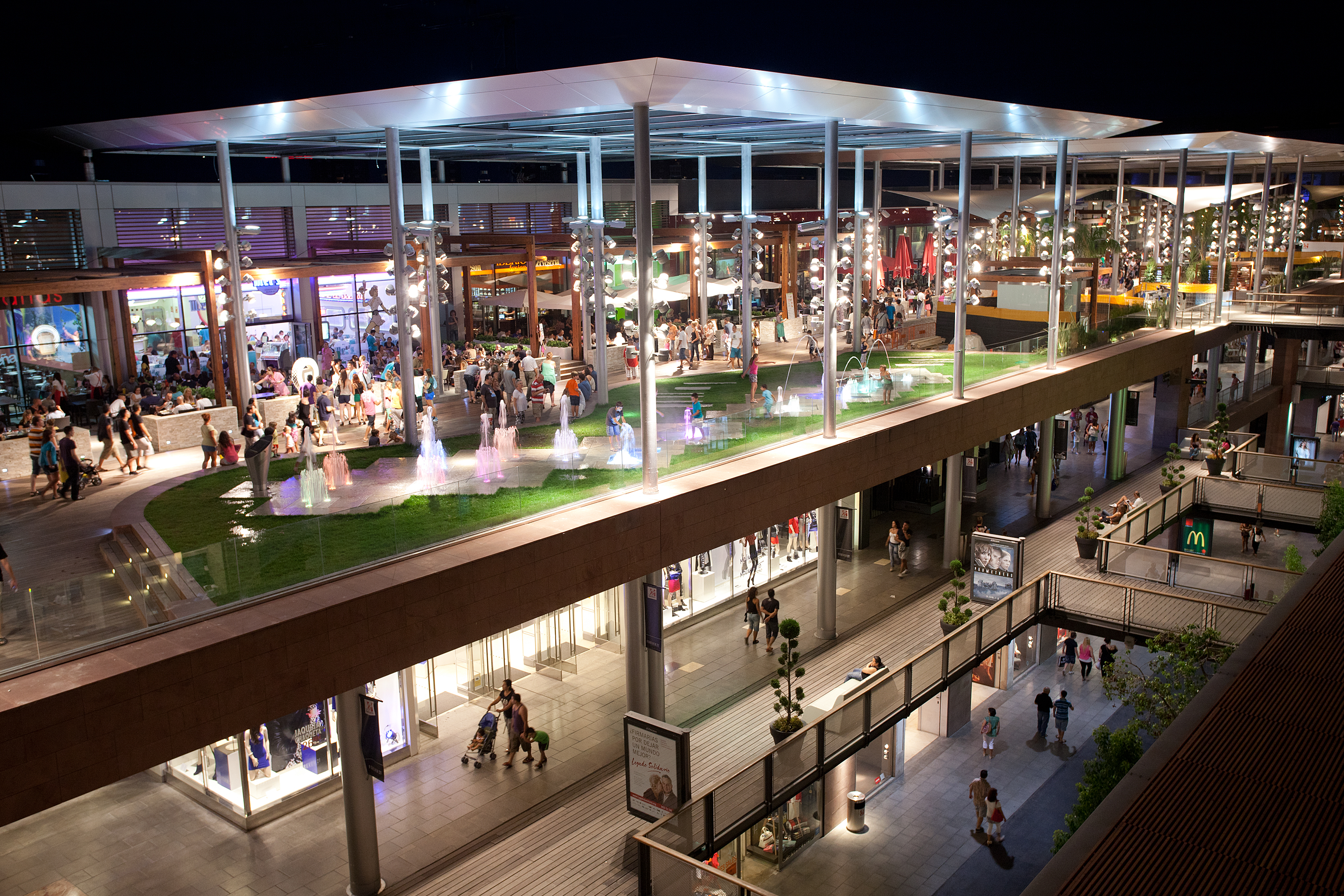
shopping mall, Spain

Apart from translations, booklets, compilations and single though some of them original historical attempts, most of 775 titles in digitalized version of Gambra's writings, released in 2002, are contributions to reviews and daily press. Since the 1940s Gambra was moderately engaged in Calvo Serrer directed Arbor. Later he switched to La Ciudad Católica, turned into Verbo, unofficial review of the Spanish Integrists, contributing also to other Catholic titles like Tradición Católica or conservative ones like Ateneo. He supplied a number of Carlist reviews and bulletins: Siempre p'alante, La Santa Causa, Montejurra and Azada y Asta, gradually eradicated from the last two by their progressist management. Through many decades he was key author of El Pensamiento Navarro. During late Francoism and afterwards he collaborated with El Alcázar and Fuerza Nueva. In the 1990s and later he appeared in nationwide press mostly as author of letters to the editor; his last item identified is from 2003. In the 1950s he engaged in private Carlist ventures Editorial Cálamo and Ediciones Montejurra.

== Carlist: confronting Franco ==
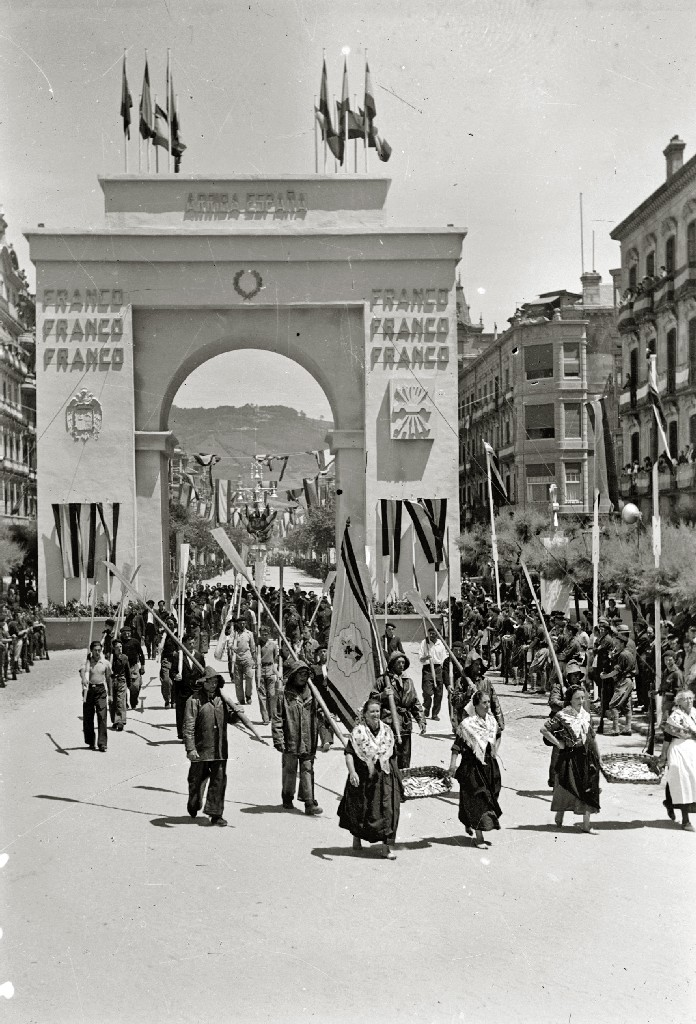
early Francoism

Released from the Carlist Requeté unit, during academic years in Madrid Gambra engaged in the Traditionalist Academia Vázquez de Mella. In the increasingly fragmented realm of post-war Carlism, headed by vacillating and hardly contactable regent Don Javier, he seemed leaning towards a candidature of Dom Duarte Nuño; the two had an amicable interview in 1941, but the young Gambra stayed within the limits of loyalty to the regent and eventually abandoned his pro-Braganza penchant, converted to supporter of the Borbón-Parmas. Having moved to Navarre in 1943 he assisted the French monarchists from fleeing the Nazi terror across the Pyrenees into Spain. In the late 1940s he gained weight within Navarrese Carlism; in the early 1950s he was already listed among "dirigentes locales" who "tenían en el país vasconavarro una indudable influencia"; in 1953 he formally entered Junta Provincial.

Since emergence of pro-Francoist Carloctavista branch in the mid-1940s Gambra was increasingly anxious about protracted regency of Don Javier. Uncompromising towards another collaborative branch, the Rodeznistas, in the early 1950s he concluded that Don Javier should reinvigorate the movement by terminating the regency and declaring his own claim to the throne. When this eventually happened in 1952, Gambra was co-author of Acto de Barcelona, a proclamation issued by the pretender and viewed also as major re-definition of the Carlist dynastical reading. Books on Traditionalist monarchy established his firm position as a recognized party theorist. In 1954 he entered sub-commission of culture within Comisión de Cultura y Propaganda of the Carlist executive, Junta Nacional.

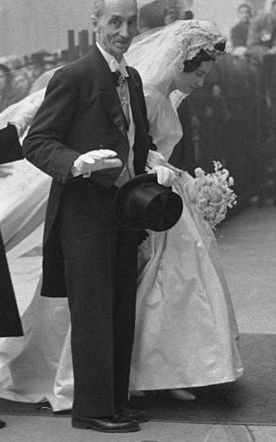
Don Javier, 1960

When discussing the mid-1950s some authors count him among the immovilistas, non-collaborative followers of Manuel Fal, while others scholars suggest he charged Fal with lack of intransigence and together with other Navarros like the Baleztena brothers he opposed him from even more anti-Francoist positions. Once Carlism changed its strategy towards cautious rapprochement, Gambra stuck to his guns and lambasted the official collaborationist path of the new leader, José María Valiente.

Uneasy about continuous vacillation of Don Javier, Gambra was cautiously supportive of inviting his son Don Carlos Hugo into the Spanish politics; he first met him in 1955 and though perplexed by unfamiliarity of the francophone prince with the Spanish affairs, it was Gambra who introduced him at the 1957 Carlist gathering at Montejurra. In the late 1950s Gambra appreciated his energetic style and focus on dynastic loyalty; he also liked young personalities from Don Carlos Hugo's entourage, especially Ramón Massó, a former Gambra's disciple from Academia Vázquez de Mella. Appreciating him as a young Catalan easily communicating with the crowd, at the turn of the decades Gambra collaborated with Massó and others; he did not realize that they exploited Mellist and federalist threads but considered him a rotten reactionary and approached his teaching highly selectively. It was only in the early 1960s that Gambra realized that Huguistas tried to outsmart the Traditionalists; having failed to prevent their increased presence in the party structures, around 1963 Gambra dissociated himself from Carlohuguismo to launch an openly confrontational bid.

== Carlist: confronting Progress ==
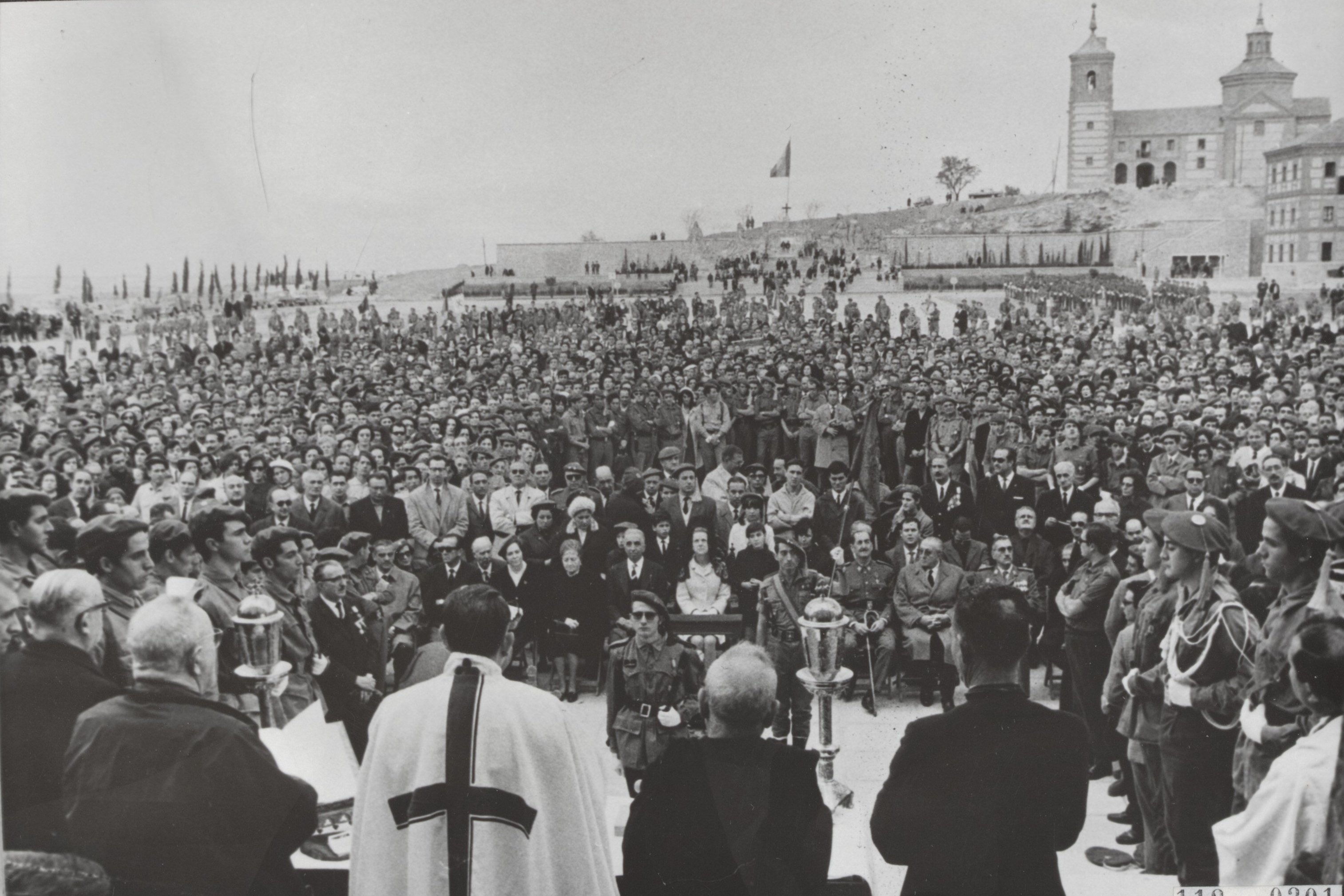
Carlist meeting, 1966

In 1963 Gambra co-founded Centro de Estudios Históricos y Políticos General Zumalacárregui; though affiliated with Movimiento Nacional, it was intended as a think-tank disseminating Traditionalism and countering progressist vision of the Huguistas. Apart from publications and minor events, its activity climaxed in two Congresos de Estudios Tradicionalistas, staged in 1964 and 1968. As supporters of Don Carlos Hugo were gaining momentum, Gambra was leaning towards rapprochement among all Carlist branches separated from the party during the last 20 years: Rodeznistas, Carloctavistas, Sivattistas and the recently expulsed politicians like José Luis Zamanillo or Francisco Elías de Tejada. Parking dynastical issues, they were supposed to be united by loyalty to Traditionalist principles and opposition to socialist penchant. The plan did not work out until the early 1970s, it is until emergence of ephemeral structure styled as ex-Requeté organization.

Gambra's efforts of the time were mostly about further refinement of Traditionalist thought in specialized reviews and conferences; they climaxed in ¿Qué es el carlismo? (1971), concise lecture of the doctrine co-authored with de Tejada and Puy Muñoz. Also in the mid-1970s he was very engaged in propaganda war with the Huguistas. The latter lambasted his accord with "ultra-fascist line" of El Pensamiento Navarro and his "posición ultramontana"; Gambra mobilized Traditionalists to challenge progressist grip on Carlism and prior to the 1976 Montejurra gathering, which effectively produced fatal casualties, called for "asistencia masiva de los verdaderos tradicionalistas, que acallará gestos y voces, 'declaraciones' y 'manifiestos', sencillamente inadmisibles, intolerables".

During final years of Francoism and during transición Gambra, always opposed to Falangism and Francoism, neared the post-Francoist búnker when confronting the change; voicing against the 1978 constitution, he sided with Blas Piñar's Fuerza Nueva until the party was dissolved in 1982. Embittered by ongoing change he tried to confront it in newspapers; he compared the setting of late transición to that of the mid-1930s, when Spain was struggling infected with deadly political viruses. He remained on the sidelines of politics; when mushrooming Traditionalist grouplets united in Comunión Tradicionalista Carlista in 1986 Gambra focused rather on youth Carlist organizations, his spotlight on cultural heritage and education. His objective was to promote Traditionalist values in the increasingly secular, modern consumer Spanish society.

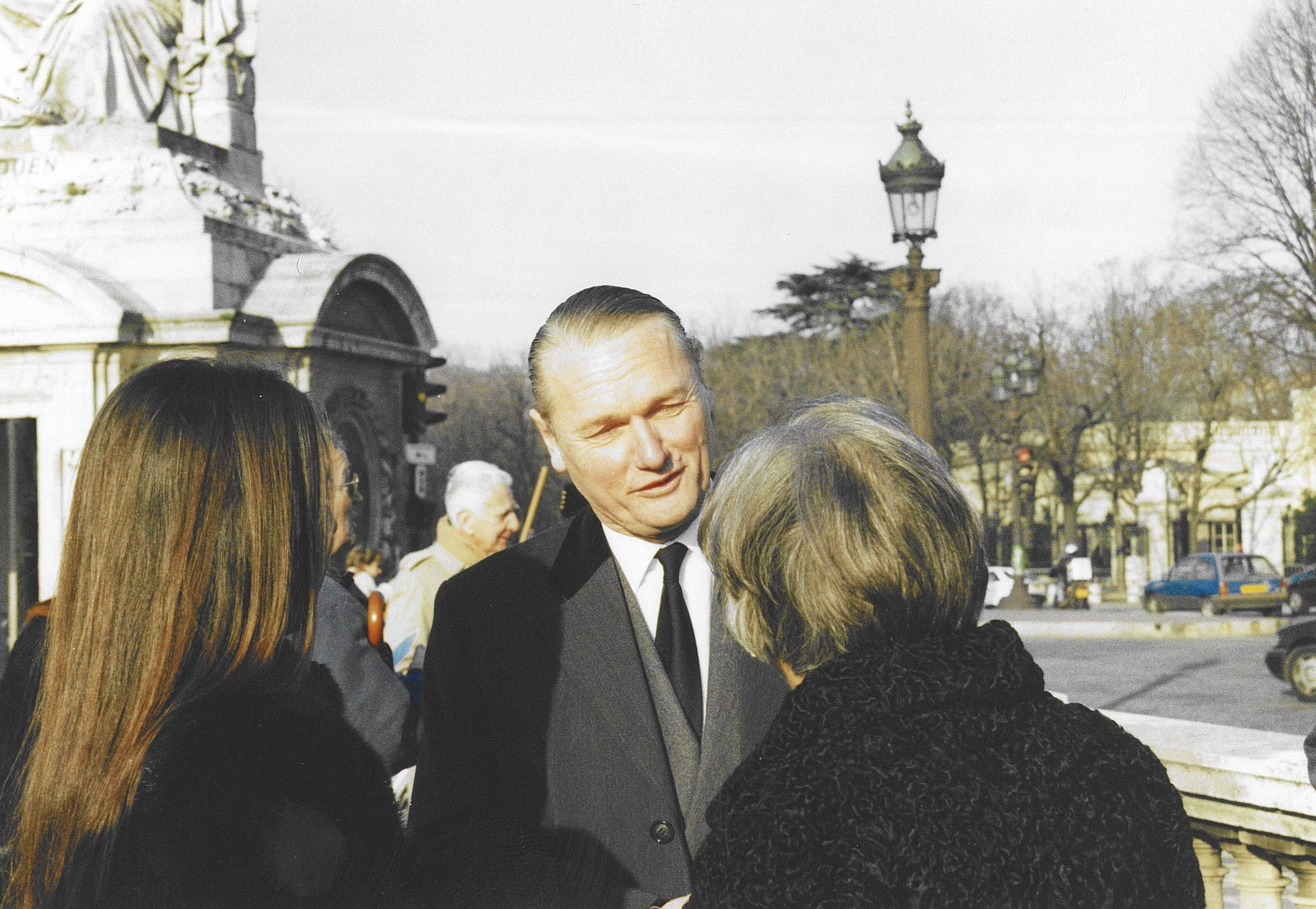
Don Sixto, 1999

In the late 1980s and the early 1990s Gambra was considered supreme authority on theory of Traditionalism. This was acknowledged during homage celebrations organized in 1998, though formal recognition came 3 years later. In 2001 Don Sixto, the younger son of Don Javier styled as Abanderado de la Tradición (though falling short either of claiming the throne or even claiming the Carlist regency) nominated Gambra chief of his Secretaría Política. Not all the Traditionalists recognized Gambra's authority; the Carloctavistas and Comunión Tradicionalista Carlista - not admitting allegiance to any dynastical line - dissociated themselves from the nomination. Assuming political leadership of the sixtinos Carlists, the 81-year-old considered his elevation another cross to bear, though as an octogenarian Gambra remained fairly active; his last public appearance took place during the Cerro de los Ángeles feast in 2002.

== Reception and legacy ==
Carlist standard

Gambra emerged as a notable Traditionalist theorist in the mid-1950s. In the late 1960s he was already a recognized authority within the movement and beyond, with first homage sessions organized in 1968; at that time his books on culture and Christianity earned him name also among wider national audience. With the commencing transición of the late 1970s his works went out of fashion up to the point of withdrawing them from bookstores. Following the 1983 publication of El lenguaje y los mitos he started to disappear from public discourse, publishing either in specialized reviews or partisan press titles. Within Traditionalism he grew to an iconic figure, honored by 1998 homage session and a monograph by Miguel Ayuso, published the same year. Though he gained a number of prizes, all of them were awarded by conservative institutions. His 2004 death was noted by some though not all nationwide newspapers and acknowledged by monographic issue of Anales de Fundación Francisco Elías de Tejada.

Taxonomy of Gambra's work is unclear. Today he is usually vaguely referred to as "thinker", an application used also by the Spanish press during his lifetime, alternating with "publicista", "catedrático", "profesor" or "ensayista". When it comes to detailed designation his work is usually classified as philosophy, though some see it as part of historiography or political science. In general Spanish encyclopedias he usually merits very brief notes. Some philosophy-dedicated dictionaries ignore him, some just mention his name and in few he is treated at length. In some manuals he appears in entries dealing with Traditionalism, though featured as a secondary theorist who failed to provide original contribution and was rather a renovator of earlier thought. As a historian by some he is denied sound credentials, counted among pseudo-scientific "historiografia neotradicionalista", others challenge this approach. As education official he is considered opponent of modernising technocratic changes. He is sometimes counted among members of "generación de 1948".

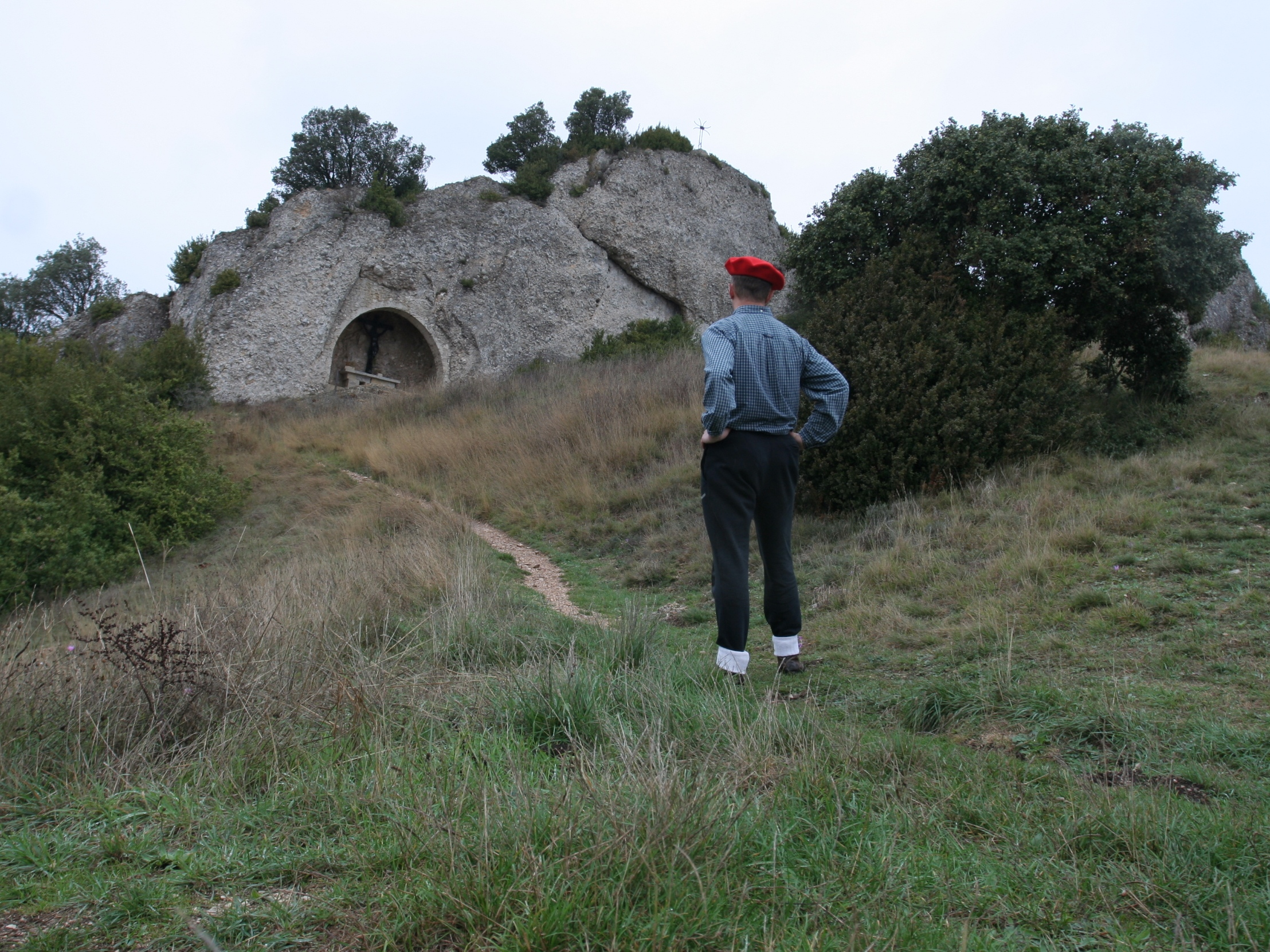
Montejurra, 2014

Within Traditionalism Gambra remains one of the all-time greats. His opus is applauded as grand contribution, a synthesis and a holistic "cosmovisión católica y española", though few authors consider his input an update rather than an original contribution. Gambra's followers see him as "pensador tradicionalista contemporáneo más importante", "esencia del tradicionalismo" or even "el más grande y el más fiel filósofo español de la segunda mitad del siglo XX", himself and counter-revolution being one and the same thing. However, also within the Traditionalist realm he found some of his concepts – especially his intransigence - challenged, like in case of a 2003 polemics with Alvaro d'Ors. During the 2014 conference on Traditionalism Gambra was dedicated one paper and featured prominently in a number of others; apart from that, both his sons acted as speakers. In the 2015 synthesis of Traditionalist thought he is the second – after Elías de Tejada - most featured author. Some of Gambra's essay books are being re-published, especially El Silencio de Dios enjoyed a number of editions and was translated into French and English. A new book was released posthumously.

== See also ==
- Carlism
- Traditionalism (Spain)
- Integrism (Spain)
- Francisco Elías de Tejada y Spínola
- José Miguel Gambra Gutiérrez
