= José Miguel Gambra Gutiérrez =

Spanish Carlist politician, philosopher

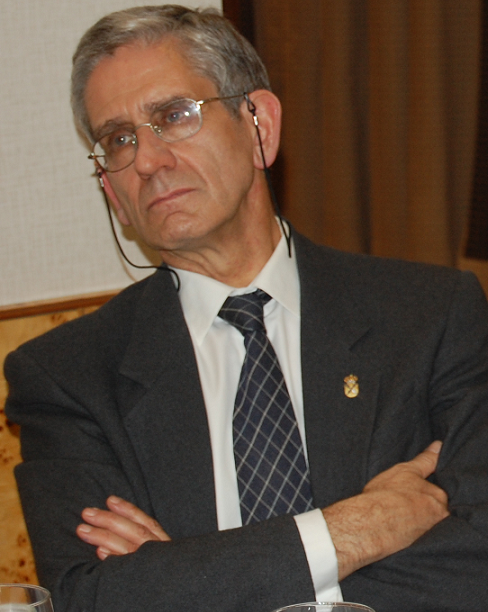
- Born: 1950 (age 75–76); Pamplona, Spain
- Education: philosopher
- Occupation: academic
- Known for: academic, politician
- Political party: Carlism

José Miguel Gambra Gutiérrez (born 1950) is a Spanish philosopher and politician. He is known mostly as the expert in logic and in the theory of predicates; since the 1980s he has been holding various teaching positions at Facultad de Filosofía of Universidad Complutense in Madrid. He is also recognized as a theorist of political and social science; Gambra advances the Traditionalist vision of state and society. In politics he adheres to the Carlist cause. In 2010-2021 he was leading one of two Traditionalist organisations in Spain, Comunión Tradicionalista.

== Family and youth ==
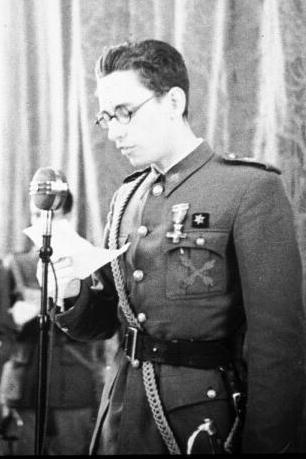
father

Gambra's paternal ancestors for generations have been related to Valle del Roncal; they made their name fighting the French in 1809. His great-grandfather Pedro Francisco Gambra Barrena rose to high positions in Ministry of Economy. His son and Gambra's paternal grandfather Eduardo Gambra Sanz (1878–1964) was an architect; his key works are offices of Sociedad Gran Peña along the Madrid Gran Via and the Omnia building at Plaza de Colón, marked by attempt to re-capture the splendor of historical Spanish architecture. His wife and Gambra's paternal grandmother Rafaela Ciudad Villalón was daughter to José Ciudad Aurioles, a deputy, senator, and President of Tribunal Supremo. Their son and Gambra's father, Rafael Gambra Ciudad (1920–2004), served as adolescent requeté during the Civil War, first in Tercio de Abárzurza and then in Tercio del Alcázar. In the Francoist Spain he made his name as a Catholic philosopher and writer; he denounced secularization of the new consumer society and remained highly skeptical about religious change triggered by Vaticanum II. Gambra Ciudad is considered one of the greatest Traditionalist theorists of all time; since 2001 he was leading the branch of Carlism loyal to Sixto de Borbón.

Gambra Ciudad was married to María del Carmen Gutiérrez Sánchez (1921–1984), translator, scholar and as Miguel Arazuri the author of numerous novels, popular especially in the 1950s and the 1960s. She was also the founder and manager of Fundación Stella, an independent radio venture. Except the turn of the 1940s and 1950s, when the couple resided in Pamplona, they lived in Madrid. They had three children, Andrés, Irene and José Miguel. None of the sources consulted provides information on José's early education; since in the mid-1950s the family moved from Pamplona to Madrid, most likely he frequented schools in the Spanish capital. He then entered an unspecified university and at the turn of the 1960s and 1970s studied philosophy; it is not clear when exactly he graduated.

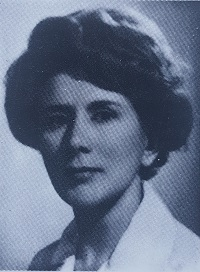
mother

At unspecified time though probably in the 1970s Gambra married María de las Mercedes Mariné Sánz. None of the sources consulted provides any information either on her or her family and it is not clear whether the two were distantly connected by virtue of their relationship to the Sanz family. They have 8 children. Olalla Gambra Mariné is a scholar of history of art; she specializes in Christian iconography and was related to Universidad San Pablo-CEU de Madrid. Paula is involved in female Carlist organization Margaritas and was its Jefa Nacional; in 2007 she unsuccessfully ran for the Madrid ayuntamiento on a Catholic list. Her sister María ran for the Senate in 2008 and also failed. Sons are not known as public figures; one is a lawyer while others hold junior business positions. Among other relatives the best known one is Gambra's brother Andrés Gambra Gutiérrez; he serves as professor of medieval history and is the university official at Universidad San Pablo-CEU. Their sister Irene works as a librarian at Complutense.

== Academic career ==
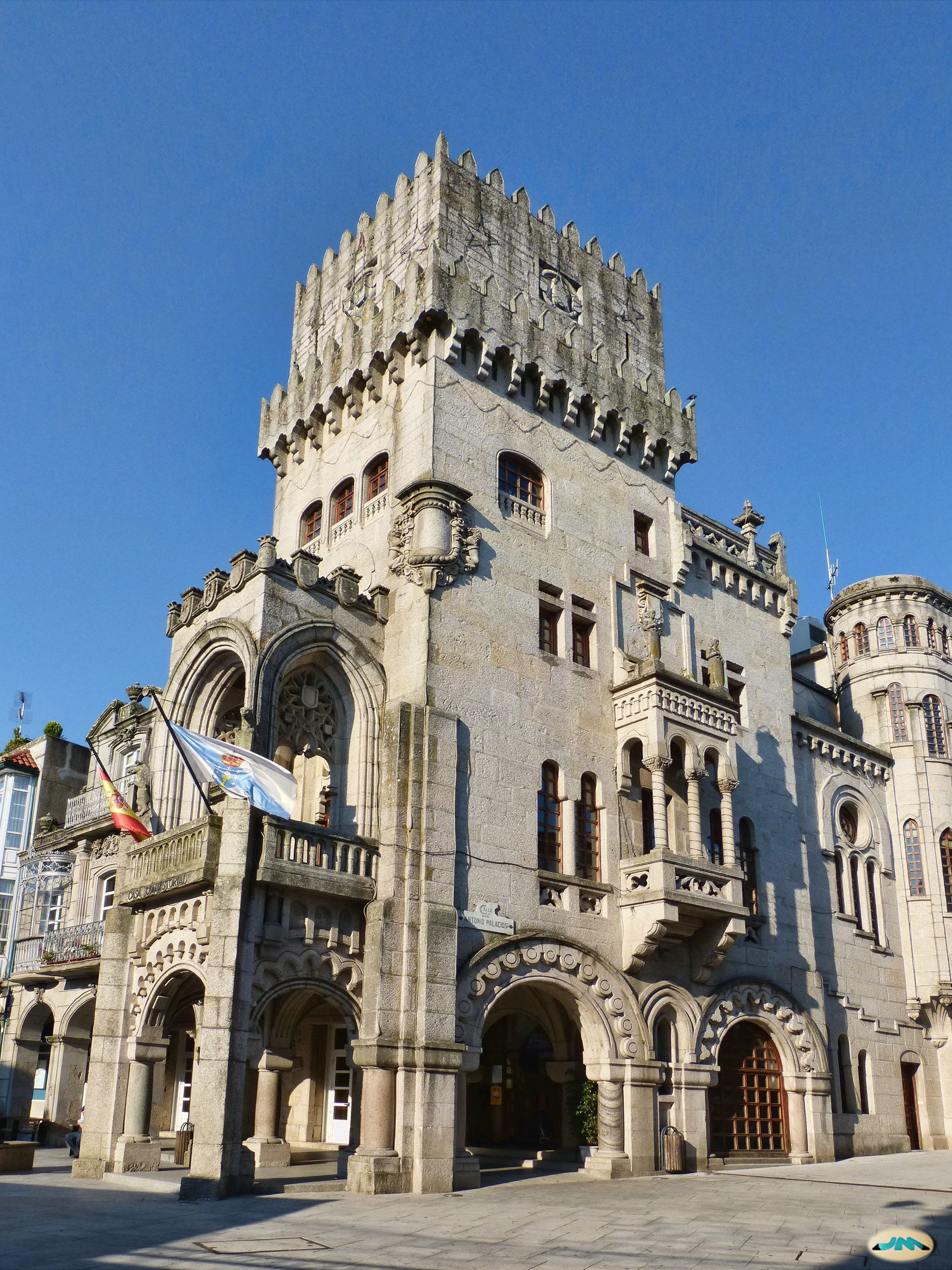
Porriño

Following graduation Gambra commenced doctoral research at Universidad Complutense in Madrid. In the mid-1970s he applied for membership in Cuerpo de Catedráticos de Enseñanza Media and in 1975 he was included on the list of aspirantes a las oposiciones a cátedras de Filosofía, Griego, Latin de Institutos Nacionales de Enseñanza Media, the pool of secondary school teachers. Gambra passed appropriate exams in the turno libre mode and in 1976 he was confirmed as a teacher of philosophy in Instituto Nacional de Bachillerato de Porriño, a public secondary school in Galicia. It is not clear whether and if yes how long he was teaching in Porriño. He completed his doctoral research with a thesis titled La doctrina de la analogía en la obra de Santiago María Ramírez: hermenéutica tomista y nuevas aportaciones. Written under the guidance of Leopoldo Eulogio Palacios, it was dedicated to philosophical theory of a renowned Spanish theologian, the one which Gambra knew personally as a friend to his father. The dissertation was accepted at Complutense and earned Gambra the PhD laurels in 1977.

Becoming eligible to junior post of assistant professor, in 1978 Gambra applied for entry into Cuerpo de Profesores Adjuntos de Universidad; he was targeting the Lógica section within the Filosofía y Letras faculty. He was included on the list of 20 applicants who competed for 6 vacant positions but it is not clear whether he was successful. However, some time at the turn of the 1970s and the 1980s Gambra obtained an academic position; in 1982 and by virtue of "concurso de traslado", which is normally applied to academics changing posts, he was admitted to Adjuncia de Lógica at Facultad de Filosofía y Letras at Universidad Complutense. He continued as professor adjunto in Madrid for a few years.

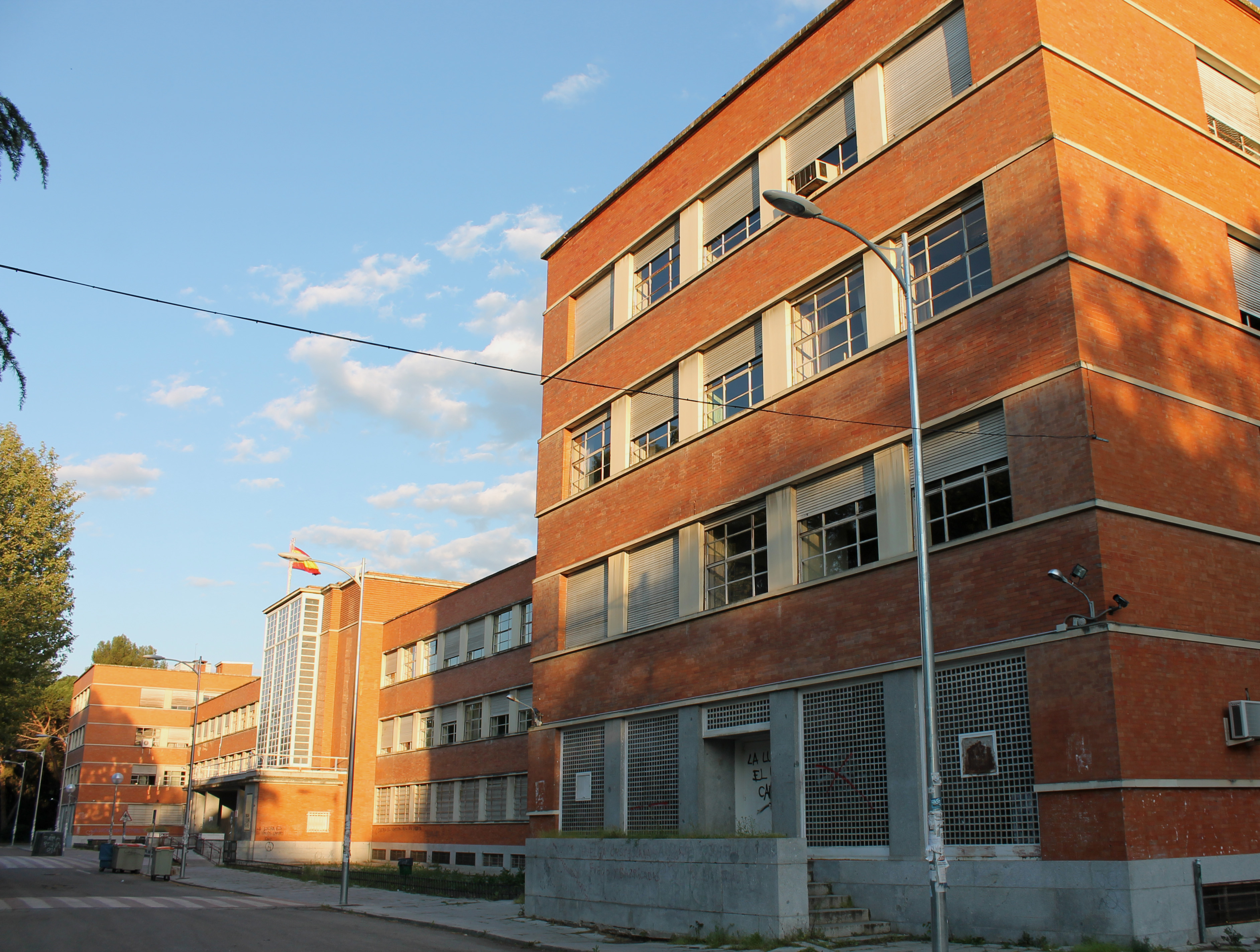
Faculty of Philosophy, Complutense

In 1986 latest Gambra made a further step in his academic career and was nominated professor titular at the Complutense, thus becoming a tenured full-time associate professor. During the following decades he was related to Departamento de Lógica y Filosofía de la Ciencia. It is not sure whether at any time he assumed directorship of the unit, though he became regular member of numerous academic bodies which inspected applications to Cuerpo de Funcionarios Docentes. He continued as professor titular during the 1990s and 2000s. In 2018 he was nominated to catedrático, the highest academic university rank in Spain. During the evaluation process his "valoración global" figure was calculated as 90,4. His area of competence was specified as Lógica y Filosofía de la Ciencia at department of Lógica y Filosofía Teórica, within Facultad de Filosofía. Though he already reached the retirement age, Gambra is still performing teaching role at the Logic and Philosophy of Science Department.

== Philosopher ==
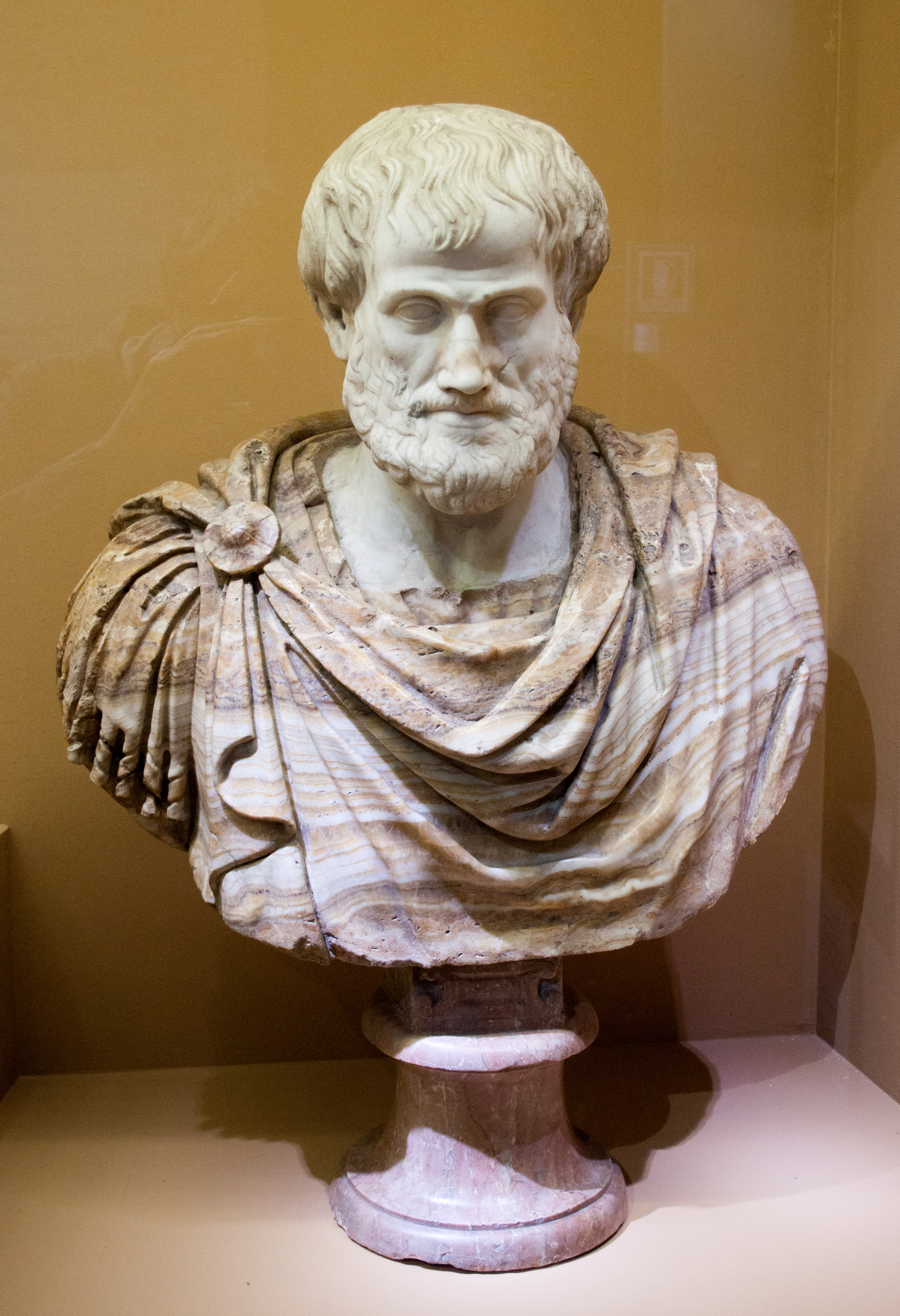
Aristotle

Gambra wrote a number of works which border philosophical reflection and are related to political theory, sociology and ethics. His scientific focus, however, has always been on philosophy. Throughout the entire academic career he has been specializing in logic. It was so largely because during his formative university years Gambra was highly influenced by Palacios, the Thomist logician who at the time served as head of Department of Logic at Complutense and who turned his academic master. In terms of detailed research Gambra's focus is on 5 major topics: mathematical logic, theory of analogy, theory of argumentation (fallacious reasoning in particular), substance theory (accidental property in particular) and Aristotelian logic; most are interwinned, like accident and predicates. Currently his lines of investigation officially listed at the Complutense web page are named as "Historia de la Lógica Medieval", "Estudios sobre el Organon de Aristóteles", "Filosofía de la matemática", and "Teoría de la argumentación y del razonamiento falaz".

Gambra's interest in mathematical logic is related to works of Aristotle, Walter Burley, Gottlob Frege, David Hilbert and Pierre Thibaud. His particular focus is on questions related to the theory of predicates, explored mostly in works written during the 1980s and 1990s. The theory of analogy was chronologically the first investigated as subject of Gambra's PhD dissertation (1977) and it has been analysed during the following 25 years. Initially Gambra inspected the issue as discussed by Santiago María Ramírez; later on his inquiry targeted Juan de Santo Tomás, Jacques Maritain and Aristotle. The theory of substance and accident earned Gambra's works written between 1993 and 2017; apart from the usual Aristotelian opus they were dedicated to Boethius and numerous medieval thinkers, in particular Petrus Hispanus. Fallacious reasoning as part of argumentation theory comes up repeatedly in various Gambra's works, but it is inspected also in few dedicated studies. Aristotle's thought has been analysed in detail in terms of his understanding of a metaphor, denotation, dialectics, predicates and other concepts; however, Gambra also offered a general analysis of the Stagirite's logic.

logical diagram (sample)

Most popular Gambra's philosophical works are books co-authored with Manuel Oriol Salgado and dedicated to the Aristotelian logic: Lógica aristotélica (2008) and Ejercicios de lógica aristotélica (2008); they are formatted as textbooks intended for students of philosophy. His original PhD dissertation has been revised and published as La analogía en general: síntesis tomista de Santiago M. Ramírez (2002). Gambra has also translated from French into Spanish La logique de Charles Sanders Peirce. De l'algèbre aux graphes by Pierre Thibaud. He fathered some 50 minor pieces, published either as contributions to joint-work volumes or in specialized reviews, like Anuario filosófico, Ciudad de Díos, Convivia, Philosophica, Philosophica Malacitana, Philosophie Antique, Revista de filosofía, Thémata, Tópicos, or Verbo. Most have been published in Spanish, though few are available in French or in English.

== Theorist of Traditionalism ==
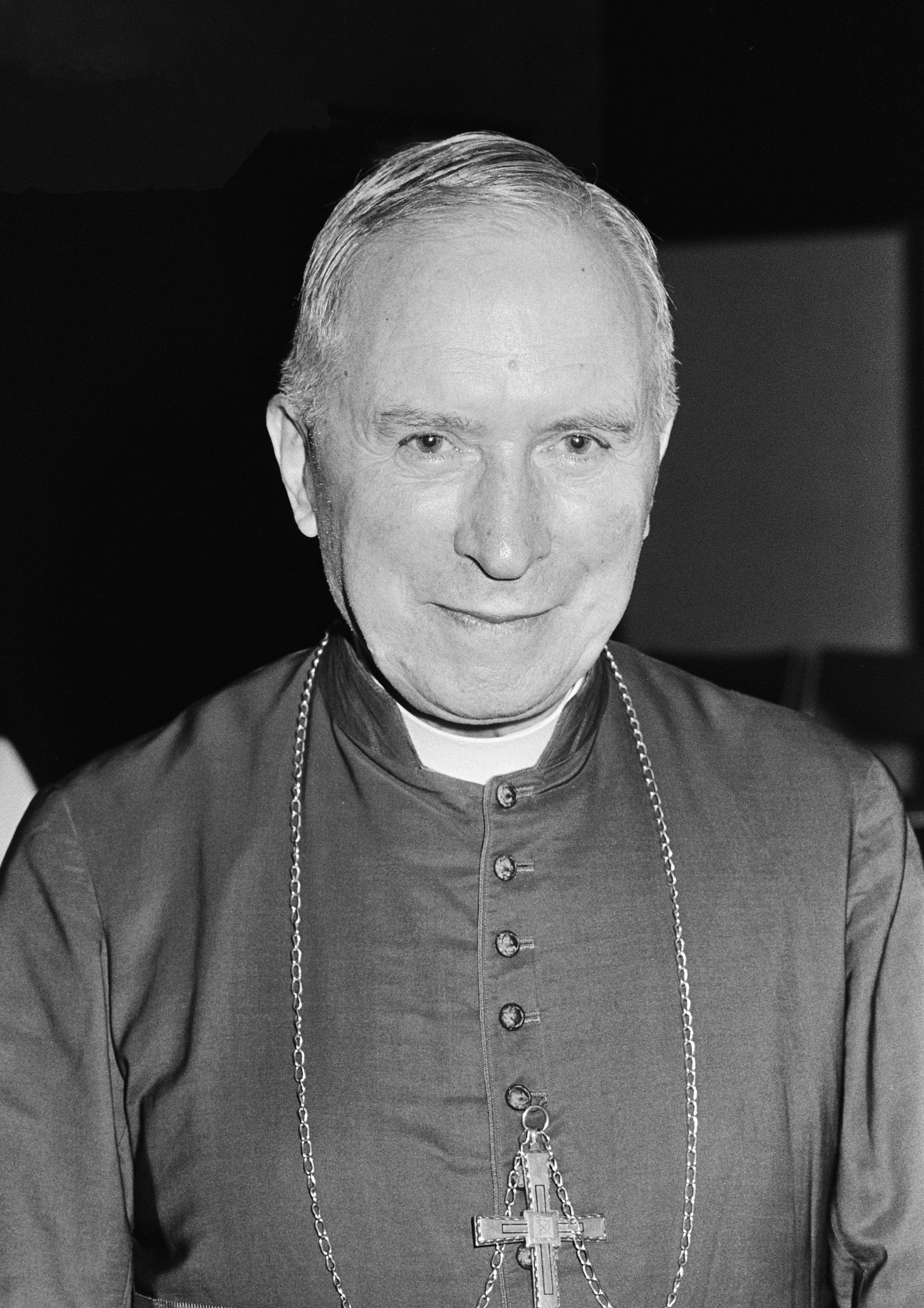
Marcel Lefebvre

Having a Carlist thinker and politician as his father and a Carlist novelist as his mother, Gambra inherited the Traditionalist outlook from both parents. Initially this mindset was calibrated along religious rather than political lines, especially that in the aftermath of the Second Vatican Council Gambra Ciudad adopted an increasingly skeptical position towards the changes advanced by papacy. In the mid-1970s it soon took shape of support for archbishop Marcel Lefebvre and his refusal to accept the conclusions of Vaticanum II. Gambra Gutiérrez first translated from French Lefebvre's pamphlet J'accuse le Concile! (1978), and then published a compilation of his works combined with extensive and highly sympathetic commentary and introduction: Monseñor Lefebvre: vida y pensamiento de un obispo católico (1980). Throughout later decades in numerous minor works he formulated his vision of Catholicism in modern world, not infrequently skeptical about the teaching of John Paul II. When outlining the conflict between personalismo of Maritain and divinismo of Palacios he decidedly sided with the latter. Gambra also attempted to challenge Maritain-derived personalist vision of human rights, human dignity and human identity; instead he offered their redefinition in line with traditional Catholic thinking. From Traditionalist positions he confronted the concept of religiously neutral public space and advocated Catholic engagement in politics. Gambra tried to put his idea into practice; in 2007 he was running in elections for a seat in the Madrid town hall. Together with his daughter, they formed part of a lay Catholic list named Tercio Católico de Acción Política; the bid ended in failure.

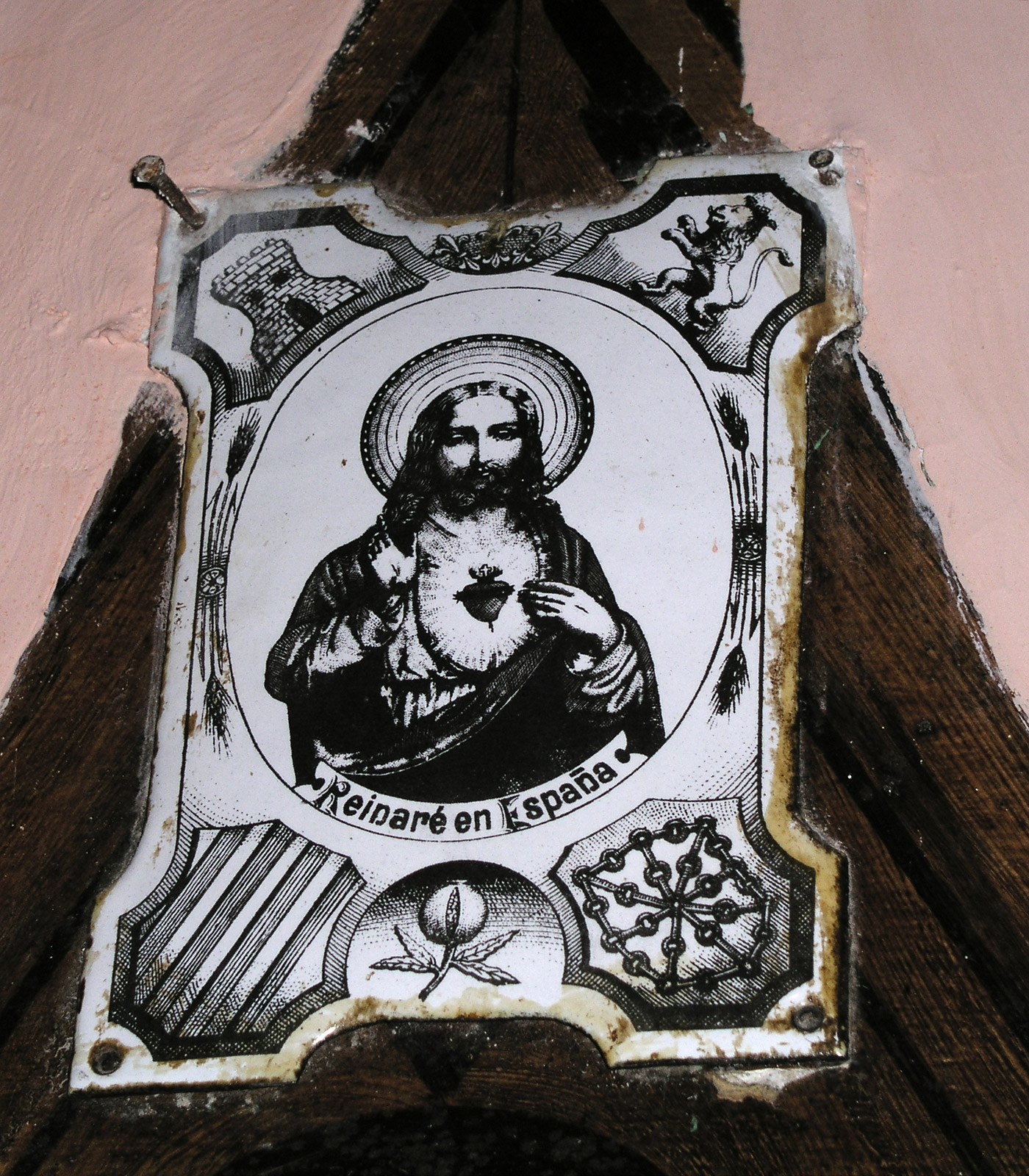
Reinaré en España

In 2019 Gambra published his opus magnum in terms of Traditionalist political theory, La sociedad tradicional y sus enemigos. The book was developed from a series of lectures, delivered during few previous years to members of Hermandad de Madrid, the youth branch of FSSPX; it is organized as a series of brief essays dealing with specific topics, grouped into 8 chapters. The lecture departs from the Popper's notion of open society, but proceeds to dismantle it. According to Gambra, Popper's bipolar division into liberal/totalitarian and conservative/progressive is untenable, as doctrines counted into both groups are in fact based on the same, revolutionary premises. Societies trapped into this false alternative grow desperate seeking solutions to malaise haunting modern communities – like "depravity of global capitalism", "culture of death", "increasingly proud crime" – but find recipes which are only partial and usually aggravate the crisis. Gambra presents Traditionalism as the only complete solution. He repudiates theories which present it as sort of Amish-like attempt to reproduce the past; instead, he presents it as the drive to reinstate traditional principles – i.e. these derived from the Revelation – in the light of present circumstances. Apart from trademark Traditionalist onslaught on liberalism the lecture contains also a new, somewhat veiled thread: warning against populist recipes advanced in Spain in the late 2010s. In some of his explicit writings Gambra concluded that eventually, parties like Vox would lead to "reproduction of the same democratic and secular despotism that we suffer from". In 2025 Gambra published another collection of essays, Escritos políticos.

== Carlist ==
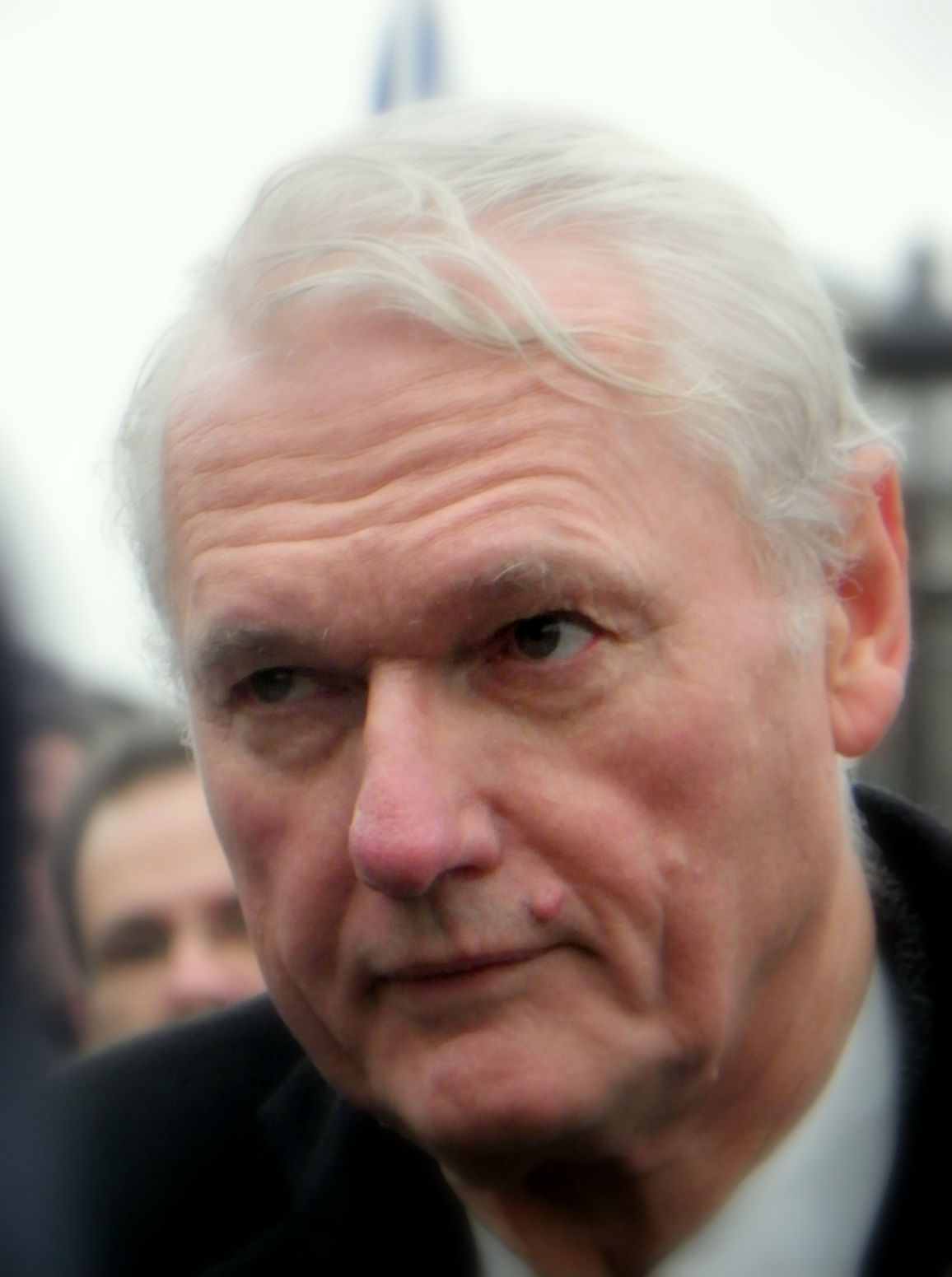
Don Sixto

Initially Gambra's public engagements were related to the lay Catholic movement and there is no information on his activity in Carlist political structures. He engrossed in buildup of a Traditionalist youth club in Madrid, which in the early post-Francoist period materialized as Círculo Cultural Antonio Molle Lazo. Gambra remained its moving spirit during the following 25 years and assumed its presidency; he excelled as organizer and protagonist of various classes and lectures. He assumed executive roles also in two nationwide cultural think-tanks flavored with Traditionalism: Fundación Elías de Tejada and Consejo de Estudios Hispánicos Felipe II. In terms of political allegiances Gambra followed his father, who in 2001 assumed leadership of Communión Tradicionalista; the organization seceded from the Carlist umbrella organization CTC and declared dynastical loyalty to Sixto Enrique de Borbón. Gambra Gutiérrez rose to high political roles in the party only after death of his father in 2004; in 2007 he entered Secretariato Político. He was among co-organizers of the 2008 Carlist Congress and delivered "the most important doctrinal lecture". In 2009 he was awarded Orden de la Legitimidad Proscrita. In 2010 Gambra replaced Miguel Ayuso as the leader of CT, appointed both head of Secretaría Política and Jefe Delegado.

Gambra's ascent confirmed rigid position of CT versus CTC. Already when assuming the post he declared that "only CT ... maintains the Carlist doctrine in its integrity". In 2012 he launched a frontal onslaught against CTC; Gambra denied its Traditionalist credentials, dubbed it "neocarlismo parroquial" and diagnosed that its leaders were more than happy to dilute non-negotiable principles in search of alliances. He lambasted also the carlohuguista pretender Carlos Javier as a ridicule figure interested mostly in getting front-page coverage of gossip magazines; the progressist Partido Carlista was dubbed “false" and having nothing to do with genuine Carlism. Gambra's vision of the party strategy was this of a long-term endurance based on doctrinal consistency, discipline, cultural work, no-compromise stand and proud boasting of the Traditionalist identity.

Carlist standard

During Gambra's tenure CT is firmly positioned as the party of protest which contests the Spanish political regime. It does not participate in elections, declares the electoral process false and calls for abstentionism, be it on the municipal, regional, or general level. Low turnout at the polls is usually declared the Traditionalist success. The party activity is focused on cultural agenda: official and semi-official websites or profiles in social media, public ceremonies held locally, formative classes or courses. Gambra himself is active as a lecturer and pundit, e.g. at Coloquios Fuego y Raya, Complutense Comunera or at other social media platforms. Occasionally he sends out letters to public media, e.g. protesting left-wing anti-religious violence at Complutense in 2011, clarifying Carlist position versus Catalanist separatism in 2017, or voicing about removal of Franco's remnants from Valle de los Caídos in 2019. In 2020 Gambra suffered an infarction, but he recovered shortly and resumed his public activity. In October 2021 Gambra resigned as jefe of Secretaría Politica and as Jefe Delegado.

== See also ==
- Traditionalism
- Carlism
- Rafael Gambra Ciudad

== Footnotes ==
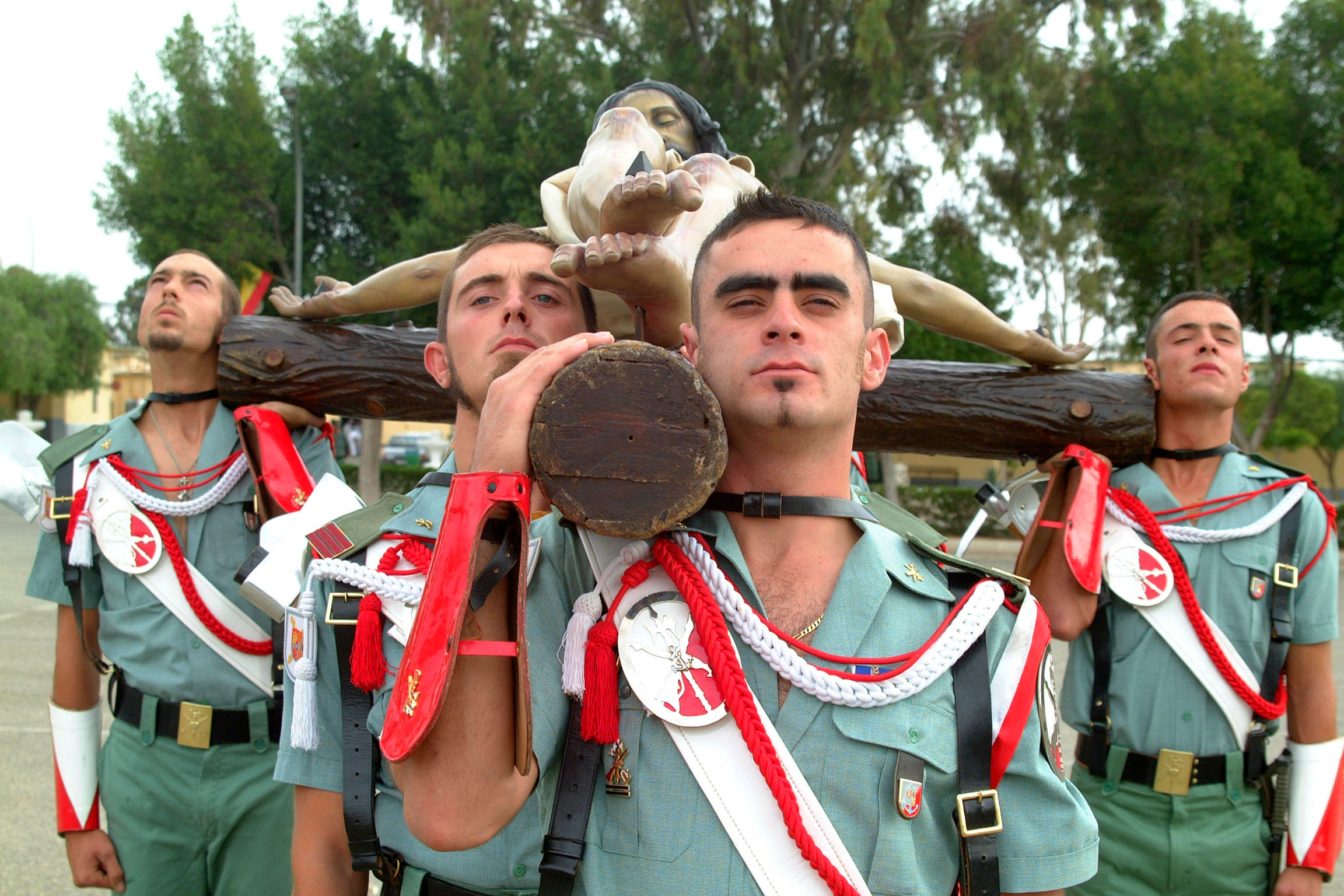
