= Malcolm Davies (classicist) =

British classicist

- Education: St. John's College, Oxford

Malcolm Davies is a British classicist and textual critic of Ancient Greek literature, and is emeritus Research Fellow in Classics at St John's College, Oxford. He specialises in the Greek epic cycle, Greek lyric poetry and Greek tragedy, and has edited texts from various ancient Greek poets.

== Selected published works ==
- 2021 - Lesser and Anonymous Fragments of Greek Lyric Poetry: A Commentary (Oxford)
- 2019 - The Cypria (Harvard)
- 2015 - The Theban Epics (Harvard)
- 2014 - Stesichorus: The Poems (Cambridge, with Patrick Finglass)
- 1991 - Poetarum Melicorum Fragmenta, Volume I (Oxford)
- 1991 - Sophocles: Trachiniae (Oxford)
- 1989 - The Greek Epic Cycle (Bloomsbury)
- 1988 - Epicorum Graecorum Fragmenta (Göttingen)

== See also ==
Sisyphus fragment
