= Psychagogy =

Psychagogy, originally a spiritual concept, refers to the guidance of the soul. It is recognized as one of the antecedents and components of modern psychology. In its contemporary context, psychagogy is a psycho-therapeutic method that influences behavior by encouraging the pursuit of meaningful life goals.

European psychagogy's beginnings can be traced back to the time of Socrates and Plato. Psychagogic methods were implemented by such groups as the Stoics, Epicureans, and Cynics. The method was also eventually adopted by Paul the Apostle, James, as well as other early Christian thinkers. Enduring well into the 20th century, psychagogy began to influence and be influenced by other psychological disciplines. Eventually the term psychagogy itself largely died out during the 1970s and 1980s, however the concept continues to be practiced through modalities like cognitive behavioral therapy, life coaching and pastoral counseling.

== Etymology ==
The word comes from the Greek ψυχαγωγία from ψυχή "soul" and ἄγω "lead"; so it literally means "soul guidance".

== History ==
=== Ancient Greek psychagogy ===
The psychagogy of Ancient Greece, also known as maieutic psychagogy, involved Socrates (or another advanced teacher) helping a participant to “give birth” to new ideas, goals, plans, etc. Because these were claimed to have been latent within the participant, the teacher was described as a figurative midwife.

- Maieutic: from midwife, one who helps in the delivery of new life
- Psychagogy: from Greek, psûchê (soul) and agogê (transport)

Within the ancient Greek tradition, psychagogy was viewed as the art of influencing the soul by the means of rhetoric. Plato believed that the human soul possesses latent knowledge, which could be brought out and elucidated by a specific type of discourse which he called dialectic: a bringing to birth from the depths of a person's higher being. He believed that a higher consciousness was needed in order to do this, and the result would bring forth a literal enlightenment and a furthered understanding of human nature.

Dialectic is the only philosophical process which seeks for wisdom by anagogically uplifting our Intellectual foundations so that our Higher Self ascends to the Origin.

— Plato, Republic, 533d

Plato also believed that only a prepared student can be involved in this process, and that the only way to prepare a student was to have them learn by doing. The process of maieutic psychagogy cannot be transmitted through writing, since it requires that a person actually experience the dynamically unfolding procedure. Dialectic took place in public areas as well as private ones, as can be seen in many of Plato's works (such as Phaedo, Meno, Phaedrus and Theaetetus). Socrates is often recorded in these works as using the process of dialectic to bring the ideas of others into being, acting as a sort of soul guide (also known as a psychagogue). In Plato's Theaetetus Socrates equates himself to a midwife, helping to bring the thoughts of others to light through his words. The term was used in Plato's Phaedrus (261a and 271c).

Additionally, key to ancient Greek philosophy was the idea of living life well and becoming the best that a person can be. This idea can be summed up by the term eudaimonia (human flourishing). Psychagogy was one practice philosophers would use to encourage people to strive toward such a goal. Although this end goal may have differed slightly between the Stoics, Epicureans, and Cynics, each group included the use of psychagogic methods in their guiding of others.

Greco-Roman philosophers often practiced psychogogy by asking people to drop their thoughts of traditional wisdom, and to ignore reputation, wealth and luxury.

The term was also used by the ancient Greeks to describe plays intended to teach civilians higher concepts. If the play had no higher teachings but still captivating it was considered "entertainment". (Entertainment is about someone coming into and controlling your mind Εnter] - from Latin intrō, from intrā (“inside”) [-tain] - from Latin sub- + teneo ("hold, grasp, possess, occupy, control") e.g. sustain, obtain. [-ment] - from Latin mēns (“the mind”).)

=== Early Christian psychagogy ===
It is thought that the idea of psychagogy was taken up by the Apostle Paul of Tarsus and early Christian thinkers, who relied on psychagogic techniques in writing the New Testament. However, psychagogy in Early Christianity took on a flavor of its own, differing slightly from the form of psychagogy that was familiar to the ancient Greeks.

Psychagogy in the Early Christian sense, while retaining its use of rhetoric, placed a special emphasis on the emotions. Paul especially used this tactic while writing his epistles. He wrote these letters to new members of the Christian faith, often encouraging them toward virtue and to become mature and complete. Paul used psychagogy in order to do so effectively, fashioning his words to fit the needs of the community. Paul presented his words gently, unlike most Cynics who were known to speak critically and aggressively. Psychagogy around this time was widespread and was recognized by most all religious and philosophical groups. Considering this, it makes sense that psychagogy would have been taught in many philosophical schools, which was perhaps how Paul learned to use such language to influence the mindset and behaviors of his audience.

One such group that recognized and applied psychagogic methods were those who led monastic lifestyles. Paul Dilley, an assistant professor of religious studies at the University of Iowa, has extensively studied this topic. Much of his research is summarized in his book Care of the Other in Ancient Monasticism: A Cultural History of Ascetic Guidance. In it, he argues that monastic psychagogy is based on the fundamental concept of a struggle for identity, a battle against hostile forces which challenge disciples' progress in virtue and salvation. He describes the two fundamental ascetic exercises, which recent converts began to practice immediately: the recitation of scripture and the fear of God, a complex sense of shame, guilt, and aversion to pain which could be mobilized to combat temptation. These exercises were learned both through individual effort, and the often harsh chastisement, both physical and verbal, of one's teacher. This style of psychagogy is similar to Plato's in that it involves a teacher in order to properly convey the techniques. Dilley states that the war with thoughts and emotions is definitely one of the most distinctive aspects of Christian psychagogy, and is connected to the importance of teachers and their emotional support, for the progress of disciples, until they are qualified to instruct others.

=== 20th century psychagogy ===
Psychagogy maintained its association with ethical and moral self-improvement, and during the 1920s psychagogic methods were assimilated into the work of hypnosis, psychoanalysis, and psychotherapy. The International Institute for Psychagogy and Psychotherapy was founded in 1924 by Charles Baudouin, a Swiss psychoanalyst. In turn, psychagogy was influenced by other psychological fields such as social psychology, developmental psychology, and depth psychology. Due to the additional effect of special education and social work on the field during the 1950s and 1960s, psychagogy and its practitioners found their way to the specialized role of working with emotionally disturbed adolescents.

In 1955, Rational Emotive Behavior Therapy (REBT) was developed by Albert Ellis, an American psychologist. Heavily influenced by psychagogic methods, REBT is an evidence-based psychotherapy that promotes goal achievement and well-being by first resolving negative emotions and behaviors. Ellis' work was extended by American psychiatrist Aaron Beck through his development of cognitive therapy. The work of Ellis, Beck and their students became known as cognitive behavioral therapy (CBT), which became a very common form of psychotherapy.

As CBT became more known and practiced, the term psychagogy fell out of use during the 1970s and 1980s.

=== Psychagogy today ===
Although the term itself is no longer common, psychagogy's influence on modern day psychology can be seen mostly within the context of pastoral counseling and cognitive behavioral therapy. Like those previously labeled "psychagogues", pastoral counselors and practitioners of CBT exhibit the same kind of care, gentleness, and encouragement in the interest of helping their patients to alter maladaptive thoughts and behaviors (or in other words, changing negative patterns of thinking and behaving to more positive ways of thinking and behaving in response to a given stimulus). These are the people "guiding souls" today.

== See also ==
- Cognitive behavioral therapy
- Life coaching
- Pastoral counseling
