= Predication (philosophy) =

Concept in metaphysics

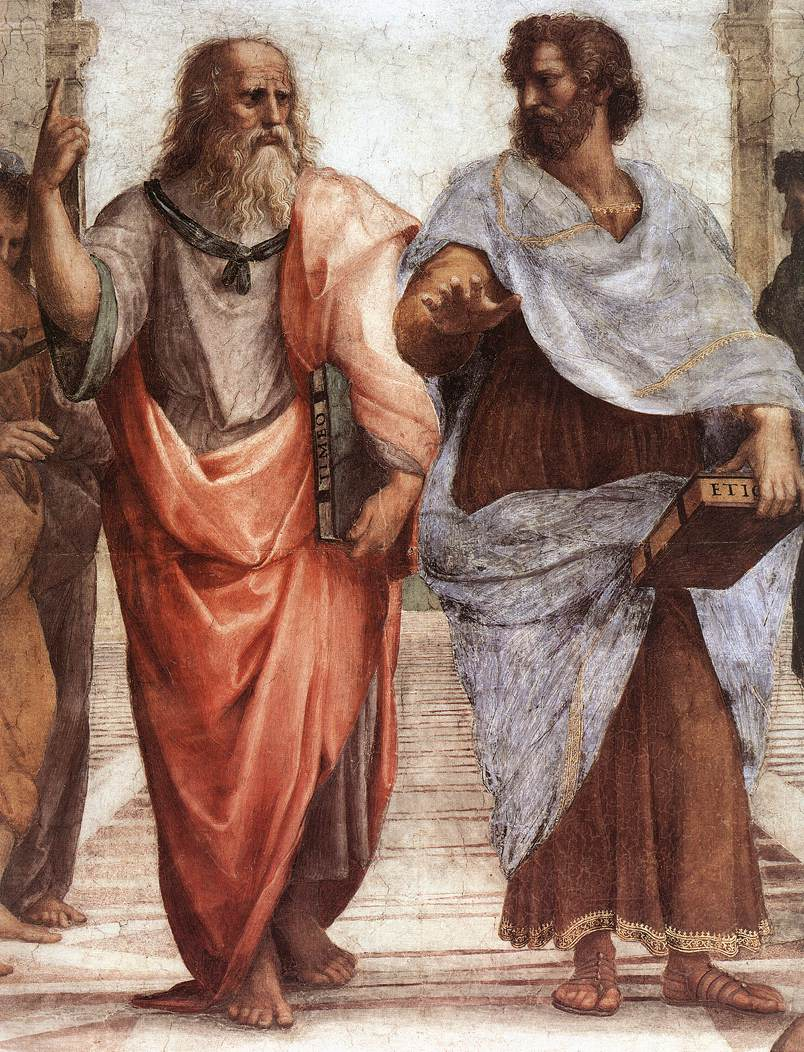
Plato and Aristotle used predication to address the problem of universals.

In philosophy, predication is an act of judgement where one term is subsumed under another. A comprehensive conceptualization describes it as the understanding of the relation expressed by a predicative structure primordially (i.e. both originally and primarily) through the opposition between particular and general or the one and the many.

Predication is also associated or used interchangeably with the concept of attribution where both terms pertain to the way judgment and ideas acquire a new property in the second operation of the mind (or the mental operation of judging).

== Background ==
Predication emerged when ancient philosophers began exploring reality and the two entities into which it is divided: properties and the things that bear them. These thinkers investigated what the division between thing and property amounted to. It was argued that the relationship resembled the logical analysis of a sentence wherein the division of subject and predicate arises spontaneously. It was Aristotle who posited that the division between subject and predicate is fundamental and that there is no truth unless a property is "predicated of" something. In Plato's works, predication is demonstrated in the analysis of desire. He stated through Socrates that the type of dominant excess gives its name to the one who has it, in the way that drunkenness gives its name to a drunkard. Here, predication confirms the reality of this form of excess on the being who partakes in it. Pythagoreans also touched on predication in explaining how number is the essence of everything. They hold that a number has an independent reality, arguing that substances such as fire and water were not the real essences of the things of which they are predicated. In describing Greek philosophy, Charles Kahn identified predication as one of the three concepts – along with truth and reality – that ontology connected.

It is suggested that predication is equivalent to the German concept of Aussage. In Grundlagen, for instance, Gottlob Frege used this term to state that a statement of a number contains a predication about a concept. As a counterpart of Aussage, predication also appeared in J. C. A. Heyse's Deutsche Grammatik (1814), which influenced the development of the Japanese notion of predication called chinjutsu. This concept was developed by the Japanese logician Yamada Yoshio, who used it to establish the study of modality. Chinjutsu would later be explored by other Japanese logicians such as Takeo Miyake, Minoru Watanabe, and Motoki Tokieda.

== Theories ==
In the philosophy of language, predication is distinguished from the linguistic predication with the notion that a predicable is a metaphysical item and is ontologically predicated of its predicand, usually its subject. The subjects are also distinguished: in linguistic predication, a subject is a grammatical item while in philosophy, it is an item in the ontology. The Aristotelian conceptualization of predication, for instance, focused on the metaphysical configurations that underlie sentences. There are scholars who note that Aristotle's thought on the subject can be distinguished in two levels: ontological (where predicates pertain to things); and, logical (where predicates are something that is said of things). Like Plato, Aristotle used predication to address the problem of universals.

In Fregean semantics, predication is described as the relation where "an argument saturates an open position in the function, cf. the simplified formula". In Abū’l-Barakāt al-Baghdādī’s scientific philosophy, predication is the judgment of the existence of a thing towards a thing. It does not constitute a judgment of the world while judgment is the assumption of the predication. It is also considered a completed notion.

According to Willard Van Orman Quine, predication involves the act of connecting singular terms in a referential position and general terms in a predicative position where, in the composed sentence, both terms have different roles. He maintained that predicates do not name, stand for, or rely on the existence of abstract entities (e.g. properties, relations, sets). The way he linked predicates to the things of which they can be predicated is not seen as a full account of the role of the predicates but this allowed his notion to avoid a regress.

Gilles Deleuze maintained that predication is not attribution since substance is not a subject of attribute. In his description of the schema of attribution, Deleuze maintained that the predicate is above all relation and event, not attribute. He drew from Gottfried Wilhelm Leibniz' conceptualization of the event, which holds that "the predicate is a verb, and that the verb is irreducible to the copula and to the attribute." The thinker posited that "the world itself is an event and, as an incorporeal (=virtual) predicate, the world must be included in every subject." He maintained that everything has a reason, examining causality by identifying an event as that which happens to a thing with or without cause or reason.

The German philosopher Gottlob Frege also developed his own theory of predication, which held that we can discern first-level predications in a simple proposition in the same way we can identify linguistic functions of a certain kind – one that yield the proposition as value once applied as arguments to one or more constituent names. His conceptual notation, which is taken to mean as universal language, stressed the distinctions between objects and properties or concepts. He maintained that different configurations are necessary for us to speak about objects due to its role in the consideration of the relationship between our language and the objects themselves.

The modern conceptualization of predication describes predication as the foundation or the condition of possibility of sense where sense is approached as belonging to thought and to the ways thought relates to things.

== Classifications ==
Aristotle said that predication can be kath hauto when the predicated universal identifies the subject as what it is, marking this type as de re necessary. It is distinguished from kata sumbebekos predication, which is concerned with how-predication or when the predicated universal merely modifies or characterizes a subject that is antecedently identified as what it is by another universal.

St. Thomas Aquinas explained that attribution or predication may be essential/substantial (per se) or accidental (per accidens). It is per se if the predicate refers to something that belongs to the subject by definition while it is per accidens when a property is attributed to something that is not its own subject. Aquinas also proposed other types of predication such as negative and affirmative, categorical and hypothetical, in necessary and contingent matter, and universal and particular, among others.

E. J. Lowe also proposed two types of predication: dispositional and occurrent. The former describes an object's belonging to a kind possessing some property, while the latter describes an object's possessing a trope of some property. A third type was also proposed, but it is a dispositional variant to express a law of nature.

In so-called "Pauline predication"—named (by Sandra Peterson, in a 1973 paper) (Note: In fact, Peterson seems to have initially developed the idea in an unpublished 1965 manuscript, which was to eventually become the 1973 paper; by that time, Gregory Vlastos had preceded her by a year or more in making published use of the term—though he nevertheless credited Peterson with its coining (in a footnote to one of the two papers in which he introduced his own—and somewhat distinct—interpretation).) for Paul's usage in 1 Corinthians 13, wherein he writes statements such as "Charity [...] is kind"—a property is not predicated literally of its bearer (as in a statement such as "charity is, itself, kind"), but rather distributively, of its bearer's instances (e.g., "whoever is charitable is kind"); or, sometimes, in a causative or explanatory way thereof ("charity is that which makes charitable people kind").

== Applications ==
In addressing the problem of universals, Aristotle established a kind of predication where universal terms are involved in a relation of predication, provided some facts that are expressed by ordinary sentences hold. It is also argued that the particular instantiates or participates in the universal; hence, universals may be needed for the predication of relations.

Predication is also used to explain the indeterminacy of mass terms. When mass terms are treated as predicates, indeterminacy is demonstrated when the terms are applied to a combination of quantities by being portions of such combinations as well as to quantities that are qualified in other ways.

In Pauline theology, Paul the Apostle employed predication to explain the qualities of God. He maintained, for instance, that "form" is a predication of God and it also serves as a predication of "Christ Jesus". Paul argued that God has a form and Jesus exists in this form.

== See also ==
- Categorical proposition (the logical form in which predication gets expressed)
- Logical predication
