= Hamilton (surname) =

Hamilton is a surname, and may refer to:

== A ==
- Aaron Hamilton (born 1978/9), Australian cricket coach
- Adam Hamilton (New Zealand politician) (1880–1952), New Zealand politician.
- Adam Hamilton (musician), American music producer, songwriter and session musician
- Adam Hamilton (pastor) (born 1964), American United Methodist Church minister
- Adolf Ludvig Hamilton (1747–1802), Swedish politician and count
- Adrian Hamilton (born 1987), American football player
- Agnes Hamilton (1868–1961), American social worker
- Agnes Sillars Hamilton (c.1794–1870), Scottish reformer and phrenologist
- Al Hamilton (born 1946), Canadian ice hockey player
- Al Hamilton (journalist), British journalist
- Alastair Hamilton (born 1941), English historian
- Alan King-Hamilton (1904–2010), British barrister and judge
- A. E. Hamilton (Albert Edwin Hamilton) (1873–1962), South Australian company director
- Aldís Amah Hamilton (born 1991), Icelandic actress
- Alex Hamilton (basketball) (born 1993), American basketball player
- Alex Hamilton (footballer, born 1936) (1936–1993), Scottish footballer
- Alex Hamilton (footballer, born 1937) (1937–2009), Scottish footballer
- Alexander Hamilton (1755 or 1757–1804), American Founding Father
- Alexander Hamilton Jr. (1786–1875), American colonel and lawyer, son of the Founding Father
- Alexander Hamilton Jr. (1816–1889), New York City lawyer, Civil War aide-de-camp, grandson of the Founding Father
- Alexander Hamilton of Innerwick (fl.1568), supporter of Mary, Queen of Scots
- Alexander Hamilton of Mirretoun (died 1579), Scottish soldier who fought for Mary, Queen of Scots
- Alexander Hamilton (artist) (born 1950), Scottish artist and publisher
- Alexander Hamilton (Australian politician) (1816–1869), member of the New South Wales Legislative Assembly
- Alexander Hamilton (bishop) (1915–2001), Bishop of Jarrow in the Church of England
- Alexander Hamilton (British Army officer) (c.1765–1838), British soldier of the Napoleonic Wars
- Alexander Hamilton (footballer, born 1865) (1865–?), Scottish footballer
- Alexander Hamilton (general) (1815–1907), American Civil War general
- Alexander Hamilton (linguist) (1762–1824), British Sanskrit scholar
- Alexander Hamilton (Maryland doctor) (1712–1756), Scottish-born doctor and writer in colonial Maryland
- Alexander Hamilton (of Ballincrieff) (1684–1763), Scottish politician
- Alexander Hamilton (priest) (1847–1928), American Episcopalian priest
- Alexander Hamilton (sailor) (before 1688 – after 1733), Scottish sea captain
- Alexander Hamilton (Scottish physician) (1739–1802), co-founder of the Royal Society of Edinburgh
- Alexander Hamilton (Virginia lawyer) (1851–1916), American lawyer and railroad executive
- Alexander Greenlaw Hamilton (1852–1941), Australian biologist
- Alexander James Hamilton (born 1967), British environmental artist
- Alexander Morgan Hamilton (1903–1970), American philanthropist and civil servant
- Alexander R. Hamilton (born 1967), British physicist
- Alexander Hamilton, 10th Lord Belhaven and Stenton (1840–1920), Scottish politician
- Alexander Hamilton, 10th Duke of Hamilton (1767–1852), Scottish politician
- Alexandra Hamilton, Duchess of Abercorn (1946–2018), British peeress and philanthropist
- Alfred Douglas-Hamilton, 13th Duke of Hamilton (1862–1940), Scottish nobleman and sailor
- Alfred Starr Hamilton (1914–2005), American poet
- Alice Hamilton (1869–1970), American medical researcher
- Alistair Hamilton (Alexander Macdonald Hamilton) (1925–2012), President of the Law Society of Scotland
- Allan Hamilton (born 1950), American physician
- Allan McLane Hamilton (1848–1919), American psychiatrist
- Allen Hamilton (1798–1864), Irish-American official and founder of Fort Wayne, Indiana
- Allison Janae Hamilton (born 1984), American artist
- Alma Mary Hamilton (1878–1862), American educator
- Alvin Hamilton (1912–2004), Canadian politician
- Alwyn Hamilton, Canadian author of Rebel of the Sands
- Amaka Agugua-Hamilton (born 1983), American basketball coach
- Amanda Hamilton (born 1974), Scottish nutritionist and television presenter
- Andrea Hamilton (born 1968), Peruvian conceptual artist and photographer
- Andrew Hamilton of Goslington (died 1592), Scottish landowner
- Andrew Hamilton, Lord Redhouse (c. 1565–1634), Scottish landowner and Senator of the College of Justice
- Andrew Hamilton (canoeist), British canoeist
- Andrew Hamilton (footballer, born 1873) (1873–1929), Scottish footballer
- Andrew Hamilton (footballer, born 1882) (1882–1915), Scottish footballer
- Andrew Hamilton (lawyer) (1676–1741), Scottish lawyer in colonial North America
- Andrew Hamilton (New Jersey governor) (died 1703), colonial governor of New Jersey
- Andrew Hamilton (priest) (died 1754), Anglican priest in Ireland
- Andrew Hamilton (rugby league) (born 1971), Australian rugby league footballer
- Andrew Hamilton (rugby union) (1893–1975), Scottish rugby union footballer
- Andrew Jackson Hamilton (1815–1875), American politician and provisional governor of Texas
- Andrew D. Hamilton (born 1952), British chemist
- Andrew H. Hamilton (1834–1895), American politician
- Sir Andrew Hamilton, 10th Baronet (born 1953), English cricketer
- Andy Hamilton (born 1954), British entertainer
- Andy Hamilton (American football) (born 1950), American football player
- Andy Hamilton (author) (born 1974), British author
- Andy Hamilton (darts player) (born 1967), British darts player
- Andy Hamilton (jazz saxophonist) (1918–2012), British jazz saxophonist
- Andy Hamilton (pop saxophonist) (born 1953), British pop saxophonist
- Angelica Hamilton (1784–1857), daughter of Alexander Hamilton and Eliza Schuyler Hamilton
- Angus Douglas-Hamilton, 15th Duke of Hamilton (1938–2010), Scottish nobleman
- Angus Douglas-Hamilton (1863–1915), Scottish recipient of the Victoria Cross
- Anitra Hamilton, American politician from West Virginia
- Ann Hamilton (artist) (born 1956), American artist
- Ann Hamilton (British actress) (born 1939), English actress
- Ann Lewis Hamilton, American television writer
- Ann Mary Hamilton (fl. 1811), English gothic and romantic novelist
- Anna Hamilton (1864–1935), French medical doctor
- Anna J. Hamilton (1860–1922), American educator and journalist
- Anna Sanborn Hamilton (1848–1927), co-founder, president, League of American Pen Women
- Lord Anne Hamilton (1709–1748), son of James Hamilton, 4th Duke of Hamilton
- Lady Anne Hamilton (1766–1846), Scottish courtier and writer, friend of Queen Caroline
- Anne Hamilton, Countess of Huntly (c.1535 – in or after 1574), daughter of James Hamilton, Duke of Chatellerault
- Anne Hamilton, 2nd Countess of Ruglen (1698–1748), suo jure Scottish peeress
- Anne Hamilton, 3rd Duchess of Hamilton (1631–1716), Scottish peeress, daughter of Sir James Hamilton, 1st Duke of Hamilton
- Anne Hamilton, Duchess of Hamilton (1720–1771), third wife of James Hamilton, 5th Duke of Hamilton
- Anne Hamilton-Byrne (1921–2019), Australian yoga teacher and cult leader
- Annette Hamilton (born 1945), Australian cultural anthropologist
- Annette Abigael Hamilton (1806–1879), Norwegian fairy-tale collector and author
- Annie Hamilton, American actress
- Annie Isabella Hamilton (1866–1941), Canadian physician
- Anthea Hamilton (born 1978), British artist
- Anthony Hamilton (Archdeacon of Colchester) (1739–1812), English Anglican cleric
- Anthony Hamilton (archdeacon of Taunton) (1778–1851), English Anglican cleric
- Anthony Hamilton (athlete) (born 1969), British paralympic athlete
- Anthony Hamilton (fighter) (born 1980), American mixed martial artist
- Anthony Hamilton (musician) (born 1971), American R&B/soul singer-songwriter and record producer
- Anthony Hamilton (racing manager) (born 1960), Grenada-born British racing-car manager, father of Lewis Hamilton
- Anthony Hamilton (singer) (born 1971), American singer
- Anthony Hamilton (snooker player) (born 1971), English snooker player
- Anthony Hamilton (soccer) (born 1985), American soccer player
- Anthony Hamilton-Smith, 3rd Baron Colwyn (1942–2024), English peer and dental surgeon
- Antoine Hamilton (Anthony Hamilton) (c.1645–1720), French classical author
- Antonio Hamilton (born 1993), American footballer
- Antony Hamilton (1952–1995), Australian actor
- Arch Hamilton (1915–1999), Australian rules footballer
- Lord Archibald Hamilton (1673–1754), Scottish Royal Navy officer, politician and colonial administrator
- Lord Archibald Hamilton (1769–1827), son of the above, Member of Parliament for Lanarkshire
- Archibald Hamilton (bishop) (c.1580–1659), Anglican archbishop of Cashel
- Archibald Hamilton (1790–1815), officer in the United States Navy
- A. M. Hamilton (Archibald Milne Hamilton) (1898–1972), New Zealand civil engineer
- Archibald Sillars Hamilton (died 1884), phrenologist in colonial Australia
- Sir Archibald Hamilton, 5th Baronet (1876–1939), British convert to Islam
- Archibald Hamilton, 9th Duke of Hamilton (1740–1819), Scottish peer and politician
- Archie Hamilton (born 1941), British politician
- Archie Hamilton (DJ), British DJ, producer and label owner
- Argus Hamilton, American comedian
- Arlan Hamilton (born 1980), American investor and author
- Arnie Hamilton (born 1948), Canadian politician
- Art Hamilton (born 1948), American politician from Arizona
- Arthur Hamilton (1926–2025), American songwriter
- Arthur Hamilton, Lord Hamilton (born 1942), Scottish judge
- Lord Arthur Hamilton (1883–1914), British Army officer and courtier
- Arthur Hamilton (badminton) (born 1905), Irish badminton player
- Arthur Andrew Hamilton (1855–1929), Australian botanist
- Arthur Francis Hamilton (1880–1965), officer of the Indian Medical Service and professor of obstetrics and gynaecology
- Arthur Hamilton, Lord Hamilton (born 1942), Scottish judge
- Ashley Hamilton (born 1974), American actor
- Ashley Hamilton (basketball) (born 1988), British basketball player
- Augustus Hamilton (1853–1913), English-New Zealand biologist and ethnologist
- Austin Hamilton (born 1997), Swedish sprinter

== B ==
- Barbara Hamilton (actress) (1926–1996), Canadian actress
- Barbara Hamilton (courtier) (died 1558), Scottish aristocrat
- Barbara Hamilton (drag racer), American drag racer
- Barbara Hamilton (judge), Canadian judge from Manitoba
- Barbara Hamilton, 14th Baroness Dudley (1907–2002), British noblewoman
- Barry Hamilton (born 1991), Irish Gaelic footballer and sports scientist
- Basil Hamilton (1696–1742), Scottish Jacobite
- Lord Basil Hamilton (1671–1701), Scottish nobleman, drowned trying to save his servant
- Becca Hamilton (born 1990), American curler
- Ben Hamilton (born 1977), American football player
- Bengt Hamilton (1892–1979), Swedish-American pediatrician
- Bernie Hamilton (1928–2008), American actor
- Beth Hamilton (born 1980), Canadian curler
- Bethany Hamilton (born 1990), American surfer and writer
- Betnijah Laney-Hamilton (born 1993), American basketball player
- Bettina Hamilton, Australian film producer
- Betty Hamilton (1904–1994), British Trotskyist
- Big John Hamilton (actor) (1916–1984), American restauranteur and actor
- Big John Hamilton (vocalist), American vocalist
- Bill Hamilton (agricultural scientist) (1909–1992), New Zealand agricultural scientist and administrator
- Bill Hamilton (engineer) (1899–1978), New Zealand engineer and inventor
- Bill Hamilton (journalist), American journalist for The New York Times
- Bill Hamilton (rugby league) (born 1945), Australian rugby league footballer
- Bill Hamilton (West Virginia politician) (born 1950), American politician
- Billy "Harp" Hamilton (born 1952), American singer, songwriter and musician
- Billy Hamilton (baseball, born 1866) (1866–1940), 19th century American baseball player
- Billy Hamilton (baseball, born 1990) (born 1990), 21st century American baseball player
- Billy Hamilton (footballer) (born 1957), Northern Irish footballer
- Billy Ray Hamilton (died 2007), American convicted murderer
- Björn Hamilton (born 1945), Swedish engineer, politician and count
- Blake Hamilton (born 1994), American basketball player
- Blayney Hamilton (1872–1946), Irish cricketer
- Bob Hamilton (1916–1990), American golfer
- Bob "Bones" Hamilton (1912–1996), American football player
- Bob Hamilton (basketball, born 1941), American college basketball coach
- Bobby Hamilton (1957–2007), American stock car racing driver
- Bobby Hamilton Jr. (born 1978), American stock car racing driver
- Bobby Hamilton (American football) (born 1971), American football player
- Bobby Hamilton (footballer) (1924–1999), English footballer
- Brad Hamilton (born 1989), Jamaican swimmer
- Bradley Hamilton (born 1992), English footballer
- Brandon Hamilton (born 1972), Canadian football player
- Brandon Blue Hamilton (born 1987), American record producer
- Brian Hamilton (actor) (born 1964), American actor
- Brian Hamilton (businessman), American entrepreneur and philanthropist
- Brian Hamilton (fencer) (born 1937), Irish fencer
- Brian Hamilton (footballer) (born 1967), Scottish footballer
- Bruce Hamilton (British Army officer) (1857–1936), British general
- Bruce Hamilton (cricketer) (1932–2020), New Zealand cricketer
- Bruce Hamilton (ice hockey) (born 1957), Canadian ice hockey executive
- Bruce Hamilton (public servant) (1911–1989), Australian public servant
- Bruce Hamilton (ophthalmologist) (1901–1968), Australian ophthalmologist
- Bruce Hamilton (rugby union) (born 1923), Australian rugby union footballer
- Bruce Hamilton (writer) (1900–1974), English novelist
- Brutus Hamilton (1900–1970), American athlete
- Bryan Hamilton (born 1946), Northern Irish football player
- Bryan Willis Hamilton (born 1983), American Krishna Consciousness Movement teacher, music producer and composer
- Bryce Hamilton (born 2000), American basketball player

== C ==
- Caleb Hamilton (born 1995), American baseball player
- Cameron Hamilton (born 1986), American business executive and government official
- Caragh Hamilton (born 1996), Northern Irish footballer
- Carey Hamilton (born 1971/2), American politician from Indiana
- Caroline Frances Hamilton (1861–1944), American physician and medical missionary
- Carl B. Hamilton (born 1946), Swedish economist, politician and count
- Carl L. Hamilton (1888–1946), American businessman
- Carl-Jan Hamilton (1916–2007), Swedish equestrian
- Carol Hamilton (born 1935), American poet from Oklahoma
- Carol Hamilton (curler), Scottish curler
- Carolyn Hamilton (born 1951), England barrister who specialises in children's rights
- Carolyn Hamilton (historian), South Africa anthropologist and historian
- Carolyn Scott-Hamilton (born 1976), American nutritionist
- Carrick Hamilton (born 1881), Scottish footballer
- Carrie Hamilton (1963–2002), American actress
- Chad Hamilton (born 1991), American football player
- Charles Hamilton, Lord Binning (1697–1732), Scottish politician
- Charles Hamilton (died 1710) (before 1640 – 1710), Irish Member of Parliament
- Charles Hamilton (bishop) (1834–1919), Anglican bishop of Ottawa
- Charles Hamilton (female husband) (c.1721–1724), woman who married while living as a man
- Charles Hamilton (handwriting expert) (1913–1996), American paleographer
- Charles Hamilton (MP, born 1704) (1704–1786), British Member of Parliament
- Charles Hamilton (orientalist) (1752/3–1792), British East India Company soldier and translator
- Charles Hamilton (rapper) (born 1987), American rapper
- Charles Hamilton (writer) (1876–1961), English author who wrote as Frank Richards
- Charles Edward Hamilton (1844–1919), Canadian politician
- C. F. Hamilton (Charles Frederick Hamilton) (1879–1933), Canadian intelligence officer and newspaper journalist
- Charles Hadley Hamilton (1850–1915), American lawyer, businessman and politician from Wisconsin, son of Charles Smith Hamilton
- Charles Iain Hamilton, British naval historian in South Africa
- Charles James Hamilton (1855–1937), member of the Canadian House of Commons
- Charles Mann Hamilton (1874–1942), American politician from New York
- Charles McGill Hamilton (1878–1952), Canadian farmer and political figure in Saskatchewan
- Charles Memorial Hamilton (1840–1875), American politician from Florida
- Charles Powell Hamilton (1747–1825), Royal Navy admiral
- Charles Smith Hamilton (1822–1891), Union Army general of the American Civil War
- Charles K. Hamilton (1885–1914), early American aviator
- Charles R. Hamilton, United States Army general
- Charles S. Hamilton (admiral) (born 1952), United States Navy admiral
- Charles S. Hamilton (philatelist) (1882–1968), United States Army colonel and philatelist
- Charles V. Hamilton (Charles Vernon Hamilton) (1929–2023), American political scientist and civil rights leader
- Sir Charles Hamilton, 1st Baronet (1845–1928), British businessman and Member of Parliament
- Sir Charles Hamilton, 2nd Baronet, of Marlborough House (1767–1849), governor of the colony of Newfoundland
- Charles Hamilton, Count of Arran (1691–1754) (1691–1754), British soldier
- Charles Hamilton, 5th Earl of Abercorn (died 1701), Scottish peer
- Charles Hamilton, 5th Earl of Haddington (1650–1685), Scottish nobleman
- Charles Hamilton, 8th Earl of Haddington (1753–1828), Scottish nobleman
- Cheryl Hamilton (born 1949 or 1950), American gymnastics judge
- Chico Hamilton (1921–2013), American jazz band leader
- Chris Hamilton (cyclist) (born 1995), Australian road cyclist
- Chris Hamilton (footballer, born 1987), Scottish footballer
- Chris Hamilton (footballer, born 2001), Scottish footballer
- Christine Hamilton (born 1949), English television personality, wife of Neil Hamilton
- CJ Hamilton (footballer) (Christopher Nathan Hamilton) (born 1995), Irish soccer player
- Chuck Hamilton (1939–2023), Canadian ice hockey player
- Cicely Hamilton (1872–1952), English actress and writer
- Claire Hamilton (born 1989), Scottish curler
- Clarence Hamilton (1833–1894), Canadian merchant and political figure in Quebec
- Clark Hamilton (1899–1980), American politician from Idaho
- Clark Hamilton (ice hockey) (1955–2022), Canadian-American ice hockey player
- Claud Hamilton of Cochno, Scottish landowner of the 16th century
- Claud Hamilton of Shawfield (died 1614), Scottish landowner
- Claud Hamilton of the Fort of Toome (died 1640), Scottish constable in County Antrim
- Lord Claud Hamilton (1787–1808), British nobleman and politician, son of the 1st Marquess of Abercorn
- Lord Claud Hamilton (1813–1884), British nobleman and politician, son of James Hamilton, Viscount Hamilton
- Lord Claud Hamilton (1843–1925), British politician and railway director, son of the 1st Duke of Abercorn
- Lord Claud Hamilton (1889–1975), British soldier and courtier, son of the 2nd Duke of Abercorn
- Claud Hamilton, 2nd Baron Hamilton of Strabane (c.1605–1638), Irish nobleman
- Claud Hamilton, 4th Earl of Abercorn (1659–1691), Irish and Scottish peer
- Claud Hamilton, 1st Lord Paisley (1546–1621), Scottish politician
- Clayton Hamilton (baseball) (born 1982), American baseball pitcher
- Clayton Hamilton (critic) (1881–1946), American drama critic
- Clive Hamilton (born 1953), Australian public intellectual and academic
- Clyde H. Hamilton (Clyde Henry Hamilton) (1934–2020), American judge
- Cobi Hamilton (born 1990), American football player
- Colin Hamilton (curler), Scottish curler
- Colin Hamilton (footballer) (born 1992), Scottish footballer
- Colin Hamilton (pentathlete) (born 1966), Australian modern pentathlete
- Conrad Hamilton (born 1974), American football player
- Constance Hamilton (1862–1945), Canadian official and activist
- Cooper Hamilton (born 2003), Australian rules footballer
- Cornelius S. Hamilton (1821–1867), American lawyer and politician from Ohio
- Cosmo Hamilton (1870–1942), English playwright and novelist
- Craig Hamilton (born 1979), Scottish rugby union footballer
- Craig Hamilton-Parker (born 1954), British psychic
- Curtis Hamilton (American football) (born 1985), American football player and actor
- Curtis Hamilton (ice hockey) (born 1991) American-Canadian ice hockey player
- Cuthbert Hamilton (1885–1959), British artist
- Cynthia Hamilton (born 2004), Australian rules footballer
- Cyril Hamilton (1909–1941), English cricketer
- CJ Hamilton (footballer) (born 1995), English footballer
- C. J. Hamilton (author) (1841–1935), English author

== D ==
- DaeSean Hamilton (born 1995), American football player
- Dale Hamilton (1919–1994), American basketball player
- Dan Hamilton (musician) (1946–1994), American musician and singer
- Dan Hamilton (politician) (born 1976), American politician from South Carolina
- Dana Hamilton (born 1950), American hammered dulcimer player
- Daniel Hamilton (basketball) (born 1995), American basketball player
- Daniel Hamilton (businessman) (1860–1939), Scottish co-operator in West Bengal
- Daniel Hamilton (Canadian politician) (1892–1965), politician in Manitoba, Canada
- Daniel W. Hamilton (lawyer), American lawyer and professor of law
- Daniel W. Hamilton (politician) (1861–1936), American politician from Iowa
- Dale E. Hamilton (1909–2002), American athlete and college coach
- Darden Hamilton (born 1956), American politician from Arizona
- Darius Hamilton (born 1993), American football player
- Darrell Hamilton (born 1965), American football player
- Darren Hamilton (born 1978), British boxer
- Darrick Hamilton, American economist and academic
- Darryl Hamilton (1964–2015), American baseball player
- Dave Hamilton (baseball) (born 1947), American baseball pitcher
- Dave Hamilton (musician) (1920–1994), American musician with The Funk Brothers, and record producer
- Davey Hamilton (born 1962), American race car driver
- Davey Hamilton Jr. (born 1997), American race car driver, son of the above
- David Hamilton of Cadzow (c.1333–c.1392), Scottish nobleman
- David Hamilton (architect), (1768–1843), Scottish architect
- David Hamilton (baseball), (born 1997), American baseball player
- David Hamilton (bishop) (died 1523), Scottish prelate
- David Hamilton (broadcaster) (born 1938), British broadcaster
- David Hamilton (British politician) (born 1950), Scottish Member of Parliament
- David Hamilton (businessman) (1923–2007), German-British clothing manufacturer and company director
- David Hamilton (Canadian politician) (born 1949), county administrator in Florida, and mayor in Ontario, Canada
- David Hamilton (Canadian producer), Canadian film producer
- David Hamilton (composer) (born 1955), New Zealand contemporary composer
- David Hamilton (diarist) (1663–1721), Scottish physician to Queen Anne
- David Hamilton (footballer) (born 1960), English footballer
- David Hamilton (judge) (born 1957), American judge
- David Hamilton (photographer) (1933–2016), British photographer and film director
- David Hamilton (psychologist) (born 1941), American social psychologist
- David Hamilton (tenor) (born 1960), Australian operatic tenor
- David Henry Hamilton (1843–1929), American farmer, businessman and politician from Texas
- David James Hamilton (1849–1909), Scottish pathologist
- David Osborne Hamilton (1893–1953), American poet
- Davie Hamilton (1882–1950), Scottish footballer
- DaVon Hamilton (born 1997), American football player
- Denis Hamilton (1918–1988), English newspaper editor
- Denise Hamilton, American crime novelist, journalist and anthology editor
- Dennis Hamilton (1944–2012), American basketball player
- Derek Hamilton (born 1958), Scottish football player
- Derreck Hamilton (born 1966), American basketball player
- Derrick Hamilton (born 1981), American football player
- Derrick Hamilton (basketball) (born 1966), American basketball player
- Des Hamilton (born 1976), English footballer
- Des Hamilton (casting director), Scottish casting director
- Devery Hamilton (born 1998), American football player
- Diana Hamilton (actress) (1898–1951), British stage actress and playwright
- Diana Hamilton (musician), Ghanaian gospel musician
- Diana Hamilton (writer) (died 2009), British writer of romance novels
- Diane Hamilton (1924–1991), American heiress; founder of Tradition Records
- Dianne Hamilton (1934–2021), American politician from New Mexico
- Don Hamilton (American football) (1887–1959), American football quarterback, baseball player and football referee
- Don Hamilton (lacrosse) (born 1937), Canadian box lacrosse goaltender and ice hockey goaltender
- Don Hamilton (sport shooter), American sports shooter
- Donald Hamilton (1916–2006), American writer
- Donald Cameron Hamilton (1883–1925), New Zealand rugby union footballer and cricketer
- Doreen Hamilton (1951–2022), Canadian politician
- Dorothy Cann Hamilton (1949–2016), founder of the International Culinary Center
- Dorrance Hill Hamilton (1928–2017), American heiress and philanthropist
- Doug Hamilton (chess player) (born 1941), Australian chess player
- Doug Hamilton (rower) (born 1958), Canadian rower
- Doug Hamilton (soccer) (1963–2006), president and general manager of the Los Angeles Galaxy
- Dougie Hamilton (born 1993), Canadian ice hockey player
- Douglas Hamilton (1818–1892), British Indian Army officer
- Douglas Hamilton (journalist) (1947–2012), Canadian-British foreign correspondent
- Douglas Hamilton, 8th Duke of Hamilton (1756–1799), Scottish peer
- Dudley Hamilton-Miller (1903–1984), English croquet player
- Duncan Hamilton (journalist) (born 1958), British author and newspaper journalist
- Duncan Hamilton (politician) (born 1973), Scottish politician
- Duncan Hamilton (racing driver) (1920–1994), British racing driver
- Duncan Hamilton (runner) (born 2000), American track and field athlete

== E ==
- Eamon Hamilton (born 1975), Canadian musician
- Earl Hamilton (1891–1968), American baseball pitcher
- Earl J. Hamilton (1899–1989), American historian
- Eaton Hamilton (born 1954), Canadian writer and poet
- Ed Hamilton (born 1947), American sculptor
- Ed Hamilton (American football) (1880–?), college football, basketball, and baseball player and coach
- Eddie Hamilton, British film editor
- Edith Hamilton (1867–1963), American educator and writer
- Edmond Hamilton (1904–1977), American science-fiction writer
- Edward Hamilton (Australian politician) (1831–?), Colonial Architect and member of the House of Assembly in South Australia
- Edward Hamilton (British Army officer) (1854–1944), British Army officer
- Edward Hamilton (homeopath) (1815–1903), British homeopath
- Edward Hamilton (pastoralist) (1809–1898), British pastoralist and politician in New South Wales
- Edward Hamilton (priest) (1819–1896), Church of Ireland cleric
- Edward Walter Hamilton (1847–1908), British political diarist and private secretary to William Ewart Gladstone
- Edward D. Hamilton (1801–1883), American attorney, military officer and politician of the Oregon Territory
- Edward L. Hamilton (1857–1923), American politician from Michigan
- Edward S. Hamilton (1917–2006), American World War II veteran and CIA operative
- Sir Edward Hamilton, 1st Baronet (1772–1851), Royal Navy admiral
- Edwin Hamilton (1885–1964), New Zealand politician
- Elaine Hamilton-O'Neal (1920–2010), American abstract painter
- Elery Hamilton-Smith (1929–2015), Australian interdisciplinary scholar and academic
- Elijah Hamilton (born 1998), American football player
- Eliza Hamilton Holly (1799–1859), daughter of Alexander Hamilton and Eliza Schuyler Hamilton
- Eliza Mary Hamilton (1807–1851), Irish poet
- Elizabeth Hamilton (fencer) (1918–2011), Canadian fencer
- Elizabeth Hamilton (writer) (1756 or 1758–1816), Scottish writer
- Elizabeth Schuyler Hamilton (1757–1854), American philanthropist, wife of Alexander Hamilton
- Elizabeth Hamilton, 1st Baroness Hamilton of Hameldon (1733–1790), Anglo-Irish courtier and society hostess
- Elizabeth Hamilton, Countess of Orkney (1657–1733), English courtier and mistress of William III
- Elizabeth Hamilton, Duchess of Hamilton (1757–1837), divorced wife of Douglas Hamilton, 8th Duke of Hamilton
- Ellen Hamilton (1889–1970), Swedish fencer
- Elsbeth Hamilton (1920–2025), British radio operator and social worker
- Elwood Hamilton (1883–1945), American judge
- Emily Hamilton (born 1971), British actress
- Emily Hamilton (politician) (born 1985), Australian politician
- Emma, Lady Hamilton (1761–1815), mistress of Lord Nelson
- Emma Hamilton (Australian actress) (born 1984), Australian actress
- Enid Hamilton-Fellows (1904–1985), English philanthropist, photojournalist and artist
- Eppie Hamilton (1900–?), American baseball player
- Eric Hamilton (American football) (born 1953), American football coach
- Eric Hamilton (bishop) (1890–1962), English Anglican bishop
- Eric Hamilton (cricketer) (1913–1943), South African Air Force officer and cricketer
- Erin Hamilton (born 1968), American singer
- Lord Ernest Hamilton (1858–1939), British politician
- Ernest Hamilton (lacrosse) (1883–1964), Canadian lacrosse player
- Esme Hamilton (born 1999), English golfer
- Estelle Brown Hamilton (1883–1933), American entrepreneur and educator
- Ethan Hamilton (born 1998), Scottish footballer
- Eugene Hamilton (American politician) (born 1941), American politician from Mississippi
- Eugene Hamilton (Kittitian politician) (born 1953), Kittitian politician
- Eugene Hamilton (physician) (1910–2005), American obstetrician, writer and medical researcher
- Eugene Lee-Hamilton (1845–1907), English poet
- Eva Hamilton (born 1954), Swedish journalist, CEO and countess
- Eva Henrietta Hamilton (1876–1960), Irish painter
- Eva McCall Hamilton (1871–1948), American politician from Michigan
- Ezra Hamilton (1833–1914), American gold miner

== F ==
- Fabian Hamilton (born 1955), British politician
- Faitalia Hamilton-Pama (born 1993), Samoan professional footballer
- Fannie Hopkins Hamilton (1882–1964) was an African-American dress maker and suffragist
- Filippa Hamilton (born 1985), Swedish-French fashion model
- Finley Hamilton (1886–1940), American politician from Kentucky
- Fiona Hamilton-Fairley (born 1963), English chef and cookery educator
- Forrest Hamilton (1931–2021), American basketball player
- Francis Alvin George Hamilton, Canadian politician
- Sir Francis Hamilton, 1st Baronet, of Killock (1606–1673), Irish landowner and politician
- Sir Francis Hamilton, 3rd Baronet (c.1640–1714), Anglo-Irish politician
- Francis Buchanan-Hamilton (1762–1829), Scottish physician and naturalist
- Frank Hamilton (American musician) (born 1934), American folk musician
- Frank Hamilton (British singer) (born 1985), English singer, songwriter and producer
- Frank Hamilton (rugby union) (1863–1901), South African rugby union footballer
- Frank Fletcher Hamilton (1921–2008), Canadian politician Frank from Saskatchewan
- Frank Hastings Hamilton (1813–1886), American surgeon
- Franklin Elmer Ellsworth Hamilton (1866–1918), American theologian; Bishop of the Methodist Episcopal Church
- Fred Hamilton (bridge) (born 1936), American bridge player
- Freddie Hamilton (born 1992), Canadian ice hockey player
- Frederic Hamilton (priest), archdeacon of Limerick
- Frederic C. Hamilton (1927–2016), American oilman and philanthropist
- Lord Frederick Hamilton (1856–1928), British politician, diplomat and author
- Frederick Hamilton (Donegal politician) (c.1663–1715), Irish Member of Parliament
- Frederick Hamilton (Londonderry politician) (died 1732), Irish Member of Parliament for Coleraine
- Frederick Hamilton (priest) (1728–1811), Anglican priest, archdeacon of Raphoe
- Frederick Hamilton (Royal Navy officer) (1856–1917), British admiral
- Frederick Hamilton (soldier) (c.1590–1647), Irish soldier of Scottish descent
- Frederick Orton Hamilton (1873–1945), American-New Zealand merchant
- Lord Frederick Spencer Hamilton (1856–1928), British politician
- Frederick William Hamilton (1815–1890), British Army officer
- Frederick W. Hamilton (1860–1940), American businessman and university president

== G ==
- Gabrielle Hamilton (actress) (1923–2014), British actress
- Gabrielle Hamilton (chef) (born 1966), American chef and author
- Garth Hamilton (born 1979), Australian politician
- Gary Hamilton (basketball) (born 1986), American basketball player
- Gary Hamilton (footballer, born 1965), Scottish footballer
- Gary Hamilton (footballer born 1980), footballer from Northern Ireland
- Gary Hamilton (kickboxer) (born 1980), Northern Ireland kickboxer
- Gary Hamilton (producer), Australian film producer
- Gary G. Hamilton, American television journalist
- Gavin Hamilton (archbishop of St Andrews) (died 1571), Scottish prelate
- Gavin Hamilton (bishop of Galloway) (1561–1612), Scottish prelate
- Gavin Hamilton (British Army officer) (1953–1982), SAS officer killed in Falklands War
- Gavin Hamilton (artist) (1723–1798), Scottish history painter
- Gavin Hamilton (cricketer) (born 1974), Scottish cricketer
- Gavin Hamilton (lawyer) (1751–1805), Scottish lawyer and patron of Robert Burns
- Gavin Hamilton, 2nd Baron Hamilton of Dalzell (1872–1952), British politician
- Gawen Hamilton (1698–1737), Scottish painter
- Gay Hamilton (born 1943), Scottish actress
- Gene Hamilton (announcer) (1910–2000), American radio announcer
- Gene Hamilton (lawyer), American lawyer and policymaker
- Geoff Hamilton (1936–1996), British gardener and broadcaster
- George Hamilton IV (1937–2014), American country music performer
- Lord George Hamilton (1845–1927), British politician
- George Hamilton of Greenlaw and Roscrea (died between 1631 and 1657), undertaker in the Plantation of Ulster
- George Hamilton (1699 moderator) (1635–1712), moderator of the General Assembly of the Church of Scotland
- George Hamilton (1805 moderator) (1757–1832), Church of Scotland minister and moderator of the General Assembly
- George Hamilton (actor) (born 1939), American actor
- George Hamilton (archdeacon) (1823–1905), British archdeacon of Lindisfarne and of Northumberland
- George Hamilton (Australian police officer) (1812–1883), settler and police officer in the colony of South Australia
- George Hamilton (broadcaster) (born 1951), Irish association football commentator
- George Hamilton (canon) (1718–1787), Scottish Anglican cleric, canon of Windsor
- George Hamilton (city founder) (1788–1836), Canadian politician and founder of Hamilton, Ontario
- George Hamilton (footballer) (1917–2001), Scottish footballer
- George Hamilton (Irish judge) (1732–1793), Irish politician, barrister and judge
- George Hamilton (lumber baron) (1781–1839), Canadian lumber baron in the Ottawa Valley
- George Hamilton (MP for Wells) (c.1697–1775), Anglo-Irish politician
- George Hamilton (musician) (1901–1957), American bandleader and songwriter, father of the actor George Hamilton
- George Hamilton (Northern Ireland police officer) (born 1967), Chief Constable of the Police Service of Northern Ireland
- George Alexander Hamilton (1802–1871), British politician and civil servant
- George Douglas Hamilton (1835–1911), New Zealand run holder and station manager
- George Ernest Hamilton (c.1800–1872), English civil engineer in South Australia
- George FitzGeorge Hamilton (1898–1918), British Army officer
- George Heard Hamilton (1910–2004), American art historian, academic and curator
- George Henry Hamilton (1875–1948), American banker
- George Rostrevor Hamilton (1888–1967), English poet and critic
- George Wellesley Hamilton (1846–1915), Canadian politician from Ontario
- George William Hamilton (1786–1857), planter and politician in Jamaica
- G. William Hamilton (George William Hamilton) (1933–2022), American politician and businessman
- Sir George Hamilton, 1st Baronet, of Donalong (c.1607–1679), Irish baronet
- Sir George Hamilton, 1st Baronet, of Ilford (1877–1947), British politician
- George Hamilton, 4th Baron Hamilton of Strabane (1636/7–1668), Irish peer
- George Hamilton, Comte d'Hamilton (died 1676), Irish soldier in French service
- George Hamilton, 3rd Earl of Abercorn (c. 1636 – bef. 1683), Scottish nobleman
- George Hamilton, 1st Earl of Orkney (1666–1737), British army officer and field marshal
- George Hamilton-Browne (1844–1916), British soldier, writer and impostor
- Gerald Hamilton (1890–1970), Irish memoirist, critic and internationalist
- Gerald Hamilton (architect) (1923–1999), Canadian architect in Vancouver
- Gerald Barrett-Hamilton (1871–1914), British natural historian
- Gia M. Hamilton (born 1978), American applied anthropologist
- Gigi Hamilton (born 1965), Swedish singer and songwriter
- Gilbert Hamilton (1869–1947), Swedish soldier
- Gilbert Hamilton of Glenarbuck (1744–1808), Scottish merchant
- Gilbert Hamilton (minister) (1715–1772), Scottish minister
- Gilbert Van Tassel Hamilton (1877–1943), American physician and writer
- Gilbert P. Hamilton (1890–1962), American film company executive and director
- Gillian Hamilton (born 1969), Canadian biathlete
- Gladstone Hamilton (1879–1961), Scottish footballer
- Gordon Hamilton (Australian footballer) (1920–1941), Australian rules footballer
- Gordon Hamilton (composer) (born 1982), Australian composer and conductor
- Gordon Hamilton (dancer) (1918–1959), Australian ballet dancer
- Gordon Hamilton (rugby union) (born 1964), Irish rugby union footballer
- Gordon Hamilton (scientist) (c.1966–2016), Scottish climate scientist who studied glaciers
- Grant E. Hamilton (1862–1926), American political cartoonist
- Grace Hamilton, known as Spice (musician), Jamaican dancehall artist
- Grace Hamilton (rugby) (born 1992), Australian rugby union and rugby league footballer
- Grace Towns Hamilton (1907–1992), American politician from Georgia
- Grace L. Hamilton (1894–1992), American artist
- Graham Hamilton (born 1944), British stage and television actor
- Graham Hamilton (swimmer) (1939–1989), Australian swimmer
- Green Polonius Hamilton (1867–1932), American educator and author
- Greg Hamilton, Canadian baseball player, coach and executive
- Greg Hamilton (footballer) (born 1968), Australian rules footballer
- Lady Grizel Louise Hamilton (1880–1976), Welsh and Scottish big game hunter
- Gustaf David Hamilton (1699–1788), Swedish count and soldier
- Gustaf Wathier Hamilton (1783–1835), Swedish count, jurist and official
- Gustav Hamilton (1650s–1691), Swedish-Anglo-Irish governor of Enniskillen
- Gustave Hamilton (1871–1951), Belgian film actor
- Gustavus Hamilton (painter) (1739-75), Irish painter
- Gustavus Hamilton, 1st Viscount Boyne (1642–1723), Irish soldier and politician
- Gustavus Hamilton, 2nd Viscount Boyne (1710–1746), Irish politician
- Gustavus Hamilton (politician) (c.1685–1735), Irish Member of Parliament
- Gustavus Hamilton, 2nd Viscount Boyne (1710–1746), Irish peer and politician
- Guy Hamilton (1922–2016), English film director
- Guy Hamilton (doctor) (1923–2010), Australian medical doctor and mental health services advocate

== H ==
- Hale Hamilton (1880–1942), American actor
- Hamilton Hamilton (1847–1928), English-born American painter
- Hamish Hamilton (director) (born 1966), British television and video director
- Hans Hamilton (c.1758–1822), Anglo-Irish politician
- Hans Hamilton, 2nd Baron HolmPatrick (1886–1942), Anglo-Irish soldier and peer
- Hans Hamilton, 4th Baron HolmPatrick (born 1955), British politician
- Sir Hans Hamilton, 1st Baronet (died 1682), Anglo-Irish politician
- Sir Hans Hamilton, 2nd Baronet (1643–1731), Anglo-Irish politician
- Harley Hamilton (1861–1933), American conductor, composer and violinist
- H. F. Hamilton (Harold Francis Hamilton) (died 1919), Canadian theologian and ecclesiastical historian
- Harold P. Hamilton (1924–2003), American college president and state government official
- Harry Hamilton (born 1962), American football player
- Harry Hamilton (politician) (fl.1889–1891), American politician from Washington State
- Hector Hamilton (died 1970), British architect in New York City
- Hedvig Hamilton (1870–1949), Swedish portrait painter
- Helen Hamilton (1874–1949), America lawyer from North Dakota
- Helen Morgan Hamilton (1896–1985), American army officer
- Henning Hamilton (1814–1886), Swedish politician, government official, author and count
- Henrietta Hamilton (1780–1857), English portrait miniaturist
- Henry Hamilton (colonial administrator) (c.1734–1796), British lieutenant-governor of Quebec and governor of Bermuda and Dominica
- Henry Hamilton (footballer) (1887–1938), English footballer
- Henry Hamilton (Irish politician) (1692–1743), Irish Member of Parliament
- Henry Hamilton (New York politician) (1788–1846), American lawyer and politician
- Henry Hamilton (playwright) (c.1854–1918), English playwright, lyricist and critic
- Henry Hamilton (priest) (1794–1880), English mathematician and cleric, Dean of Salisbury
- Henry Hamilton (winemaker), founder of a South Australian family winery
- Henry DeWitt Hamilton (1863–1942), adjutant general of the New York State Militia
- Henry Sidney Hamilton (1887–1976), Canadian Member of Parliament
- Sir Henry Hamilton, 1st Baronet (1710–1782), Anglo-Irish politician
- Henry Hamilton, 2nd Earl of Clanbrassil (c.1647–1675)
- Henrietta Hamilton (1780–1857), painter; wife of Sir Charles Hamilton
- Herbert Hamilton (1895–1918), British World War I flying ace
- Herbert Hamilton (footballer) (1906–1951), English footballer
- Sir Hew Hamilton-Dalrymple, 10th Baronet (1926–2018), British soldier
- Holly Hamilton, British journalist and presenter for the BBC
- Homer Hamilton (1913–1997), Canadian politician from Manitoba
- Horace Hamilton (1880–1971), British civil servant
- Hubert Hamilton (1861–1914), British general
- Hugh Hamilton (bishop) (1729–1805), mathematician, natural philosopher and Church of Ireland bishop
- Hugh Hamilton (mayor), New Zealand struck-off lawyer and convicted fraudster
- Hugh Hamilton (racing driver) (1905–1934), British racing driver
- Hugh Hamilton (rugby union) (1854–1930), Scotland international rugby union player
- Hugh Hamilton (sailor) (1830–1890), American Civil War sailor and Medal of Honor recipient
- Hugh Douglas Hamilton (c.1749–1808), Irish artist
- Hugh Hamilton, 1st Viscount of Glenawly (c. 1600–1678), Irish aristocrat, soldier in Swedish and English service
- Hugo Hamilton (writer) (born 1953), Irish writer
- Hugo E. G. Hamilton (1849–1928), Swedish politician
- Hugo Hamilton, Baron Hamilton (died 1724), Swedish military commander

== I ==
- Iain Hamilton (composer) (1922–2000), Scottish composer
- Iain Hamilton (journalist) (1920–1986), British magazine editor
- Ian Hamilton (advocate) (1925–2022), Scottish lawyer
- Ian Hamilton (baseball) (born 1995), American baseball pitcher
- Ian Hamilton (British Army officer) (1853–1947), British general
- Ian Hamilton (cricketer) (1906–1992), New Zealand cricketer
- Ian Hamilton (critic) (1938–2001), British critic, poet, literary magazine publisher and editor
- Ian Hamilton (footballer, born 1940) (1940–2021), English footballer
- Ian Hamilton (footballer, born 1950) (1950–2024), English footballer
- Ian Hamilton (footballer, born 1956), English footballer with Darlington, La Louvière and Liège
- Ian Hamilton (footballer, born 1967) (1967–2023), English footballer with West Bromwich Albion and Sheffield United
- Ian Hamilton (writer) (born 1946), Canadian author of mystery novels
- India Hamilton (c. 1879–1950), African-American educator
- Ion Hamilton, 1st Baron HolmPatrick (1839–1898), Anglo-Irish politician
- Isaac Hamilton (born 1994), American basketball player
- Isaac D. Hamilton (1804–1859), Texas Revolutionary soldier
- Isaac Miller Hamilton (1864–1952), American banker and politician from Illinois
- Israel Hamilton (1799–1843), American lawyer

== J ==
- Jacinta Hamilton (born 1983), Australian basketball player
- Jack Hamilton (baseball) (1938–2018), American baseball pitcher
- Jack Hamilton (footballer, born 1928) (1928–1990), Australian rules football player and administrator
- Jack Hamilton (footballer, born 1937), Australian rules footballer for South Melbourne
- Jack Hamilton (footballer, born 1994), Scottish football goalkeeper
- Jack Hamilton (footballer, born 2000), Scottish football player
- Jack Hamilton (sports executive) (1886–1976), Canadian sports executive
- Jackie Hamilton (1937–2003), British comedian
- Jackie Hamilton (ice hockey) (1925–1994), Canadian ice hockey player
- Jahmar Hamilton (born 1990), Anguillan cricketer
- Jakar Hamilton (born 1989), American football player
- Jake Hamilton (born 1979), American Christian singer and songwriter
- James Hamilton Jr. (1786–1857), American lawyer and politician from South Carolina
- James Hamilton of Cadzow (before 1397 – c.1440), 5th Laird of Cadzow
- James Hamilton of Finnart (died 1540), Scottish military engineer and architect
- James Hamilton (died 1771) (1685–1771), Irish Member of Parliament
- James Hamilton (American football) (born 1974), American football player
- James Hamilton (assassin) (died 1581), Scottish assassin
- James Hamilton (archdeacon of Raphoe) (1636–1689), Irish Anglican priest
- James Hamilton (attorney) (born 1938), American lawyer known for participation in the Watergate Committee
- James Hamilton (barrister) (born 1949), Irish barrister and director of public prosecutions in Ireland
- James Hamilton (bishop of Argyll) (died 1580), Scottish prelate
- James Hamilton (bishop of Galloway) (1610–1674), Scottish prelate
- James Hamilton (British Army officer, born 1777) (1777–1815), British army colonel
- James Hamilton (cricketer) (1843–1881), Australian cricketer
- James Hamilton (DJ and journalist) (1942–1996), British DJ and dance music columnist
- James Hamilton (English army officer) (died 1673), Irish courtier and soldier
- James Hamilton (footballer, born 1869) (1869–1951), Scottish football player
- James Hamilton (footballer, born 1884) (1884–?), English football player
- James Hamilton (footballer, born 1901) (1901–1975), Scottish football player
- James Hamilton (footballer, born 1904), English footballer for Crystal Palace
- James Hamilton (footballer, born 1906), Scottish footballer for Carlisle United and Rochdale
- James Hamilton (footballer, born 1955), Scottish footballer for Sunderland and Carlisle United
- James Hamilton (language teacher) (1769–1829), Irish proponent of the "Hamiltonian system" for teaching languages
- James Hamilton (minister, born 1600) (1600–1666), Scottish minister active in Ireland
- James Hamilton (minister, born 1814) (1814–1867), Scottish minister and author, primarily in London
- James Hamilton (painter) (fl.1640–1680), Scottish painter
- James Hamilton (Pennsylvania politician) (1710–1783), lawyer and administrator in colonial Pennsylvania, son of the lawyer Andrew Hamilton
- James Hamilton (photographer) (born 1946), American photographer
- James Hamilton (physician, born 1749) (1749–1835), Scottish physician
- James Hamilton (physician, born 1767) (1767–1839), Scottish physician
- James Hamilton (physicist) (1918–2000), Irish mathematician and theoretical physicist
- James Hamilton (priest, born 1748) (1748–1815), Irish priest and astronomer
- Jamie Hamilton (publisher) (1900–1988), Scottish-American book publisher and champion oarsman
- James Hamilton (Scottish politician) (1918–2005), Scottish politician
- James Hamilton (snowboarder) (born 1989), New Zealand snowboarder
- James Alexander Hamilton (1788–1878), acting United States secretary of state
- James Alexander Hamilton (music writer) (1785–1845), English compiler of musical instruction books
- James Arnot Hamilton (1923–2012), British aerospace engineer
- James de Courcy Hamilton (1860–1936), British Royal Navy officer and fire officer
- James Hans Hamilton (1810–1863), Anglo-Irish member of parliament
- James Harold Hamilton (1932–2009), American politician from Alabama
- James Inglis Hamilton (died 1803), British general
- James Kent Hamilton (1839–1918), American mayor of Toledo, Ohio
- James Whitelaw Hamilton (1860–1932), Scottish artist
- James A. Hamilton (1876–1950), American educator and politician from New York
- James D. Hamilton (born 1954), American econometrician
- James E. Hamilton (1935–2019), American politician from Oklahoma
- James G. C. Hamilton (1851– 1926), American sculptor
- James R. Hamilton (1938–2011), American politician from Georgia
- James M. Hamilton (James McClellan Hamilton) (1861–1940), American historian, economist and university president
- James P. Hamilton, American chemistry and entrepreneur
- James Hamilton, 3rd Baron Hamilton of Strabane (1633–1655), Irish nobleman
- James Hamilton, 4th Baron Hamilton of Dalzell (1938–2006), British politician
- Sir James Hamilton, 2nd Baronet, of Rosehall (1682–1750), Scottish Jacobite, Member of Parliament for Lanarkshire
- Sir James Hamilton, 2nd Baronet, of Woodbrook (1802–1876), British Member of Parliament
- James Hamilton, 1st Duke of Abercorn (1811–1885), twice served as Lord Lieutenant of Ireland
- James Hamilton, 2nd Duke of Abercorn (1838–1913), British nobleman and diplomat
- James Hamilton, 3rd Duke of Abercorn (1869–1953), first governor of Northern Ireland
- James Hamilton, 4th Duke of Abercorn (1904–1979), Northern Irish senator
- James Hamilton, 5th Duke of Abercorn (born 1934), Northern Irish politician
- James Hamilton, 1st Duke of Hamilton (1606–1649), heir to the throne of Scotland
- James Hamilton, 4th Duke of Hamilton (1658–1712), Scottish nobleman
- James Hamilton, 5th Duke of Hamilton (1703–1743), Scottish nobleman
- James Hamilton, 6th Duke of Hamilton (1724–1758), Scottish nobleman
- James Hamilton, 7th Duke of Hamilton (1755–1769), Scottish nobleman
- James Hamilton, Duke of Châtellerault (c.1516–1575), and 2nd Earl of Arran, Scottish nobleman
- James Hamilton, 1st Earl of Abercorn (1575–1618), Scottish diplomat
- James Hamilton, 2nd Earl of Abercorn (c.1604–c.1670), Scottish nobleman
- James Hamilton, 6th Earl of Abercorn (c.1661–1734), Scottish and Irish nobleman
- James Hamilton, 7th Earl of Abercorn (1686–1744), Scottish nobleman and amateur scientist
- James Hamilton, 8th Earl of Abercorn (1712–1789), Anglo-Irish peer
- James Hamilton, 1st Earl of Arran (c. 1475–1529), Scottish nobleman
- James Hamilton, 3rd Earl of Arran (1537–1609), Scottish nobleman
- James Hamilton, 1st Earl of Clanbrassil (first creation) (c.1618–1659), Anglo-Irish Royalist peer, soldier and politician
- James Hamilton, 1st Earl of Clanbrassil (second creation) (1694–1758), British politician
- James Hamilton, 2nd Earl of Clanbrassil (1730–1798), Irish peer
- James Hamilton, 1st Lord Hamilton (c.1415–1479), Scottish nobleman
- James Hamilton, Lord Paisley (died before 1670), eldest son of James Hamilton, 2nd Earl of Abercorn
- James Hamilton, Lord Pencaitland (1659–1729), Scottish judge
- James Hamilton, 2nd Marquess of Hamilton (1589–1625), 4th Earl of Arran, Scottish nobleman
- James Hamilton, 1st Viscount Claneboye (c.1560–1644), Ulster-Scot landowner and settler
- James Hamilton, Viscount Hamilton (1786–1814), British politician
- James Hamilton-Paterson (born 1941), British poet and novelist
- James Stevenson-Hamilton (1867–1957), nature reserve warden, founder of the Kruger National Park, South Africa
- Jamie Hamilton (footballer) (born 2002), Scottish footballer
- Jamie Hamilton (motorcyclist) (born 1991), Northern Irish motorcycle racer
- Jamie Hamilton (publisher) (1900–1988), British book publisher and rower
- Jamie Hamilton (rugby union) (born 1970), English rugby union footballer
- Jamie Lee Hamilton (1955–2019), Canadian politician
- Jan Hamilton, now Abigail Austen (born 1964), first officer in the British Army to complete gender reassignment from male to female
- Jane Hamilton (born 1957), American novelist
- Jane, Lady Archibald Hamilton (before 1704 – 1753), British noblewoman and courtier
- Jane Hamilton (actress) (1915–2004), American film actress
- Jane Hamilton (British noblewoman) (died 1753), British noblewoman
- Jane Eaton Hamilton (born 1954), Canadian short story writer, poet and photographer
- Jane Soley Hamilton (1805–1897), Canadian pioneer midwife in Nova Scotia
- Jane Hamilton-Merritt (born 1947), American academic, photojournalist and activist
- Janet Hamilton (1795–1873), Scottish poet
- Jean Constance Hamilton (born 1945), American judge
- Jeff Hamilton (baseball) (born 1964), American baseball player
- Jeff Hamilton (designer) (born 1955), Moroccan celebrity fashion designer
- Jeff Hamilton (drummer) (born 1953), American jazz drummer
- Jeff Hamilton (ice hockey) (born 1977), American ice hockey player
- Jeff Hamilton (skier) (1966–2023), American speed skier
- Jen Hamilton, American nurse, author, and social media personality
- Jeremiah Hamilton (died 1875), American businessman
- Jeremiah J. Hamilton (1838–1905), American political organizer in Texas
- Jesse Hamilton, American lawyer and politician from New York City
- Jesse A. Hamilton (born 1974), American journalist
- Jessie Hamilton (1865–1960), American artist
- Jim Hamilton (baseball) (1922–1977), American baseball player
- Jim Hamilton (footballer, born 1966), Scottish footballer (Arbroath, Stirling Albion, Dumbarton)
- Jim Hamilton (footballer, born 1976), Scottish footballer (Heart of Midlothian, Aberdeen, Dundee United, Motherwell)
- Jim Hamilton (ice hockey) (born 1957), Canadian ice hockey player
- Jim Hamilton (politician), American politician from Montana
- Jim Hamilton (rugby union) (born 1982), Scottish rugby union footballer
- Jimmy Hamilton (1917–1994), American jazz clarinetist and saxophonist
- Jimmy Hamilton (curler), Scottish curler
- Jimmy Hamilton (footballer, born 1904) (1904 – after 1939), English footballer
- Jimmy Hamilton (footballer, born 1906), Scottish footballer between 1926 and 1940
- Jimmy Hamilton (footballer, born 1954), Scottish footballer
- Jo Hamilton (interior designer) (born 1969), British interior designer
- Jo Hamilton (musician), British musician
- Jo Hamilton (politician) (1827–1904), California Attorney General
- Jo Hamilton (subpostmaster) (born 1957), British sub-postmaster and justice campaigner
- Joanne Hamilton, British parasitologist
- Jock Hamilton (A. John Hamilton, 1869–1931), Scottish footballer
- Jock Hamilton (footballer, born 1879) (John H. Hamilton, 1879–1925), Scottish footballer for Leith Athletic, Leeds City and Brentford
- Jody Hamilton (1938–2021), American professional wrestler, promoter and trainer
- Joe Hamilton (American football) (born 1977), American football player and coach
- Joe Hamilton (basketball) (born 1948), American basketball player
- Joe Hamilton (producer) (1929–1991), American television producer
- Joey Hamilton (born 1970), American baseball player
- Joel Hamilton (born 1980), American record producer, audio engineer and musician
- John Hamilton of Blair (c.1638–1690), Church of Scotland minister and bishop
- John Hamilton of Cadzow (before 1370 – c. 1402), Scottish nobleman and soldier
- John Hamilton, Lord Magdalens (1561–1632), Scottish judge
- John "Bugs" Hamilton (1911–1947), American trumpeter
- John Hamilton (died 1757), Member of the Irish Parliament for Dundalk and Carlow
- John Hamilton (1715–1796), Member of the Scottish Parliament
- John Hamilton (actor) (1887–1958), American actor
- John Hamilton (American Revolution) (died 1816), Loyalist military officer in the American Revolutionary War
- John Hamilton (archbishop of St Andrews) (1512–1571), Scottish politician and cleric
- John Hamilton (artist) (1919–1993), British army officer and artist
- John Hamilton (British Army officer) (1724–1802), British Army officer who served in North America
- John Hamilton (congressman) (1754–1837), American politician from Pennsylvania
- John Hamilton (controversialist) (c.1547–1611), Scottish Catholic controversialist
- John Hamilton (cricketer) (1855–1904), English cricketer
- John Hamilton (farmer) (1888–1930), Scottish sheep farmer in Patagonia and the Falkland Islands
- John Hamilton (footballer, born 1876) (1876–1947), Scottish footballer for FC Barcelona
- John Hamilton (footballer, born 1880) (1880 – after 1904), Scottish footballer for West Ham United
- John Hamilton (footballer, born 1891) (1891–1964), Australian rules footballer for Fitzroy
- John Hamilton (footballer, born 1946) (1946–2007), Australian rules footballer for Melbourne
- John Hamilton (gangster) or Jack Hamilton (1898–1934), Canadian murderer and bank-robber
- John Hamilton (Jacobite) (1651/52–1691), Irish military officer in the Williamite War
- John Hamilton (Kansas politician) (1892–1973), American politician and chairman of the Republican National Committee
- John Hamilton (Liverpool) (1922–2006), Leader of Liverpool City Council 1983–1986
- John Hamilton (Lord Provost) (1754–1829), Scottish merchant, Lord Provost of Glasgow
- John Hamilton (Loyalist) (died 1816), British Army officer
- John Hamilton (moderator) (1713–1780), minister of the Church of Scotland
- John Hamilton (New Jersey politician) (c.1681–1747), American politician
- John Hamilton (New Zealand politician) (1871–1940), New Zealand politician
- John Hamilton (Ontario politician) (1802–1882), Canadian Senator representing Ontario
- John Hamilton (painter) (fl.1765–1786), British painter
- John Hamilton (priest) (died 1756), Irish Anglican priest
- John Hamilton (Quebec politician) (1827–1888), Canadian Senator representing Quebec
- John Hamilton (Queensland politician) (1841–1916), member of the Queensland Legislative Assembly
- John Hamilton (RNZAF officer) (fl.1971–2006), Chief of the Royal New Zealand Air Force
- John Hamilton (Royal Navy officer) (1714–1755), British naval officer
- John Hamilton (Royal Navy officer, born 1910) (1910–1994), British admiral
- John Hamilton (Tasmanian politician) (1834–1924), member of Tasmanian House of Assembly 1891–1903
- John Hamilton (university chancellor) (1851–1939), Quebec merchant and chancellor of Bishop's University
- John Borden Hamilton (1913–2005), Canadian lawyer and politician
- John Brown Hamilton (1896–1973), Scottish recipient of the Victoria Cross
- John Church Hamilton (1792–1882), son of the American founding father Alexander Hamilton
- John Claude Hamilton (1854–1908), Scottish-Canadian politician
- John Fane Charles Hamilton (1829–1864), British naval officer, namesake of Hamilton, New Zealand
- John Graham Hamilton (1910–1994), British admiral
- John Marshall Hamilton (1847–1905), governor of Illinois
- John Maxwell Hamilton (born 1947), American journalist and academic
- John McLure Hamilton (1853–1936), Anglo-American artist
- John Patrick Hamilton (1896–1961), Australian recipient of the Victoria Cross
- John Randle Hamilton (born 1944), American diplomat
- John Robinson Hamilton (1808–1870), Canadian lawyer and political figure in Quebec
- John Ronald Hamilton (1871–1940), New Zealand politician
- John Taylor Hamilton (1843–1925), US Representative from Iowa
- John William Hamilton (1845–1934), American Bishop of the Methodist Episcopal Church
- John B. Hamilton (John Brown Hamilton) (1847–1898), American physician and soldier, United States Surgeon General
- J. C. Hamilton (John C. Hamilton) (1913–1991), American baseball player
- John F. Hamilton (1893–1967), American actor
- J. H. Hamilton (John H. Hamilton), American baseball player
- John H. Hamilton Jr. (1919–1986), American politician from Pennsylvania
- John M. Hamilton (1855–1916), American politician from West Virginia
- John R. Hamilton (architect) (John Robert Hamilton) (c.1823–1874), English architect
- John R. Hamilton (photographer) (1923–1997), American photographer
- John T. Hamilton (born 1963), American literary scholar and musician
- John Hamilton, 1st Baron Hamilton of Dalzell (1829–1900), Scottish soldier and politician
- John d'Henin Hamilton, 3rd Baron Hamilton of Dalzell (1911–1990), British soldier, peer and courtier
- Sir John Hamilton, 1st Baronet, of Dunamana (c.1740–1802), Anglo-Irish politician
- Sir John Hamilton, 1st Baronet, of Marlborough House (1726–1784), Royal Navy officer
- Sir John Hamilton, 1st Baronet, of Woodbrook (1755–1835), British and Portuguese general of the Napoleonic Wars
- John Hamilton, 4th Earl of Haddington (1626–1669), Scottish nobleman
- John Hamilton, 1st Lord Bargany (died 1658), Scottish peer
- John Hamilton, 1st Lord Belhaven and Stenton (died 1679), Scottish peer
- John Hamilton, 2nd Lord Bargany (c.1640–1693), Scottish peer and soldier
- John Hamilton, 2nd Lord Belhaven and Stenton (1656–1708), Scottish politician and critic of the 1707 Acts of Union
- John Hamilton, 1st Marquess of Abercorn (1756–1818), Anglo-Irish peer and politician
- John Hamilton, 1st Marquess of Hamilton (1540–1604), Scottish nobleman
- John Hamilton, 1st Viscount Sumner (1859–1934), British law lord
- John Agar-Hamilton (1895–1984), South African historian and Anglican priest
- Sir John Hamilton-Dalrymple, 5th Baronet (1780–1835), Scottish politician
- John Hamilton-Leslie, 9th Earl of Rothes (1679–1722), Scottish nobleman
- Johnny Hamilton (basketball) (born 1994), Trinidadian basketball player
- Johnny Hamilton (footballer, born 1935) (1935–2013), Scottish footballer for Heart of Midlothian
- Johnny Hamilton (footballer, born 1949) (1949–2015), Scottish footballer for Hibernian and Rangers
- Jon Hamilton, American radio science correspondent
- Jones S. Hamilton (1833–1907), American businessman, sheriff and politician from Mississippi
- Jordan Hamilton (basketball) (born 1990), American basketball player
- Jordan Hamilton (soccer) (born 1996), Canadian soccer player
- José Ignacio García Hamilton (1943–2009), Argentine writer
- Joseph "Jody" Hamilton (1885–1906), American mass murderer
- Joseph Hamilton (American football coach) (1919–2014), American football coach
- Joseph Hamilton (goalball) (born 1978), American goalball player
- Joseph Hamilton (politician) (born 1950s), Guyanese politician
- Joseph Hamilton (Wisconsin assemblyman) (1826–1912), American printer, newspaper editor and politician
- Joseph Gilbert Hamilton (1907–1957), American professor of medical physics and experimental medicine
- J. G. de Roulhac Hamilton (Joseph Grégoire de Roulhac Hamilton) (1878–1961), American historian
- Joseph B. Hamilton (1817–1902), American teacher, lawyer, judge and politician from Wisconsin
- Joseph H. Hamilton (born 1932), American physicist and academic
- Josh Hamilton (born 1981), American baseball player
- Josh Hamilton (actor) (born 1969), American actor
- Judd Hamilton, American musician and actor
- Judith Hamilton, Canadian theatre director
- Julian Hamilton (born 1976), Australian musician
- Julie Hamilton, Australian actress
- Justin Hamilton (basketball, born 1980), American basketball player
- Justin Hamilton (basketball, born 1990), American basketball player
- Justin Hamilton (comedian), Australian comedian, writer and radio host
- Justin Hamilton (defensive lineman) (born 1993), American football player
- Justin Hamilton (safety) (born 1982), American football player
- J. E. Hamilton (1852–1940), American industrialist in Wisconsin
- J. Hamilton-Holder (born 1912), Trinidadian politician

== K ==
- Karen Hamilton, American politician
- Katherine Hamilton (1863–1932), American suffragist
- Kathleen Hamilton, Duchess of Abercorn (1905–1990), British courtier
- Kathryn Hamilton, British theatre director
- Keith Hamilton (American football) (born 1971), American football player
- Keith Hamilton (politician) (born 1936), Australian politician
- Keith N. Hamilton, American writer and government official from Utah
- Kelly Hamilton (born 1949), American military pilot
- Kenneth Hamilton (born 1963), Scottish pianist
- Ker Baillie-Hamilton (1804–1889), British colonial administrator
- Kevan Hamilton (1934–2017), Australian rules footballer
- Kevin Hamilton (basketball) (born 1984), American basketball player
- Kevin Hamilton (politician) (born 1938), Australian politician
- Kim Hamilton (1932–2013), American actress
- Kipp Hamilton (1935–1981), American actress
- Kristen Hamilton (born 1992), American soccer player
- Kyle Hamilton (born 2001), American football player
- Kyle Hamilton (rower) (born 1978), Canadian rower
- Kyonte Hamilton (born 2002), American football player

== L ==
- LaDarius Hamilton (born 1998), American football player
- Laird Hamilton (born 1964), American big-wave surfer
- Lamont Hamilton (born 1984), American basketball player
- Lance Hamilton (born 1973), New Zealand cricketer
- Lannel Hamilton (born 1993), Trinidadian footballer
- Larry Hamilton (1931–1996), American professional wrestler
- Larry Hamilton (musician) (1951–2011), American blues singer and songwriter
- Laura Hamilton (born 1982), English television presenter and entrepreneur
- Laurell K. Hamilton (born 1963), American fantasy and romance writer
- Laurentine Hamilton (1826–1882), American cleric
- Lawrence Hamilton (born 1972), political theorist
- Lee Hamilton (1931–2026), American lawyer and politician from Indiana
- Lee Hamilton (sports), American sportscaster and radio talk show host
- Leigh Hamilton (1949–2012), New Zealand-American actress and gallerist
- Len Hamilton (1899–1987), Australian politician
- Leo Richard Hamilton (1927–2010), American politician from Wisconsin
- Leonard Hamilton (born 1948), American basketball coach
- Les Hamilton (born 1954), Canadian boxer
- Leslie Hamilton (died 1927, as appears), British flying ace of World War I
- Letitia Marion Hamilton (1878–1964), Irish landscape artist
- Lewis Hamilton (born 1985), British racing driver
- Lewis Hamilton (footballer) (born 1984), English footballer
- Lewis Hamilton (priest) (died 1743), Irish Anglican priest, Archdeacon of Elphin
- Lexi Hamilton (born 2000), Australian rules footballer
- Liam Hamilton (1928–2000), Irish judge and barrister
- Lillias Hamilton (1858–1925), English doctor and author
- Linda Hamilton (born 1956), American actress
- Linda Hamilton (soccer) (born 1969), American soccer player
- Lindsay Hamilton (born 1962), Scottish footballer
- Linley Hamilton (born 1965), Northern Irish musician, educator and broadcaster
- Lionel Hamilton, English theatre director and actor
- Lisa Hamilton, American poker player
- LisaGay Hamilton (born 1964), American actress
- Lloyd Hamilton (1891–1935), American silent film actor
- Lloyd Andrews Hamilton (1894–1918), American World War I flying ace
- Lois Hamilton (1943–1999), American model, author, actress, artist and aviator
- Louis Keppel Hamilton (1890–1957), Royal Navy officer
- Louis McLane Hamilton (1844–1868), Union Army cavalry officer in the American Civil War
- Louis McLane Hamilton (lieutenant) (1876–1911), United States Army officer
- Louisa Hamilton, Duchess of Abercorn (1812–1905), wife of James Hamilton, 1st Duke of Abercorn
- Lowell Hamilton (born 1966), American basketball player
- Lucas Hamilton (born 1996), Australian cyclist
- Lucille Hamilton (born 1969), Australian basketball player.
- Lucretia Breazeale Hamilton (1908–1986), American botanical illustrator
- Lucy Hamilton (cricketer) (born 2006), Australian cricketer
- Lucy Hamilton (musician), member of the No Wave band Mars
- Luke Hamilton (born 1992), Scottish rugby union footballer
- Lyn Hamilton (1944–2009), Canadian author
- Lynell Hamilton (born 1985), American football player and coach
- Lynley Hamilton (born 1959), Australian cricketer
- Lynn Hamilton (actress) (1930–2025), American actress
- Lynn Hamilton (basketball) (born 1962), née Polson, Canadian basketball player
- Lynn Hamilton (politician)
- Lynne Hamilton (born 1950), English singer

== M ==
- Maggie Hamilton (1867–1952), Scottish artist
- Mahlon Hamilton (1880–1960), American actor
- Malcolm Hamilton (American football) (born 1972), American football player
- Malcolm Hamilton (bishop) (died 1629), Church of Ireland Archbishop of Cashel
- Malcolm Hamilton (harpsichordist) (1932–2003), American harpsichordist
- Malyk Hamilton (born 1999), Canadian soccer player
- Marc Hamilton (1944–2022), French Canadian singer from Quebec
- Marci Hamilton (born 1957), American constitutional law scholar
- Marcus Hamilton (American football) (born 1984), American football player
- Margaret Hamilton (actress) (1902–1985), American film character actress
- Margaret Hamilton (educator) (1871–1969), American educator
- Margaret Hamilton (nurse) (1840–1922), American nurse in the Civil War
- Margaret Hamilton (publisher) (1941–2022), Australian publisher of children's literature
- Margaret Hamilton (software engineer) (1936–2026), American computer scientist
- Margaret Hamilton, Lady Belhaven and Stenton (before 1625 – c.1695), Scottish noblewoman
- Marguerite Hamilton (1920–1998), American author
- Marianne-Caroline Hamilton (1777–1861), Irish artist and memoirist
- Marjorie Hamilton (1898–1990), Canadian politician
- Mark Hamilton (baseball) (born 1984), American baseball player
- Mark Hamilton (bassist), Northern Irish bass guitarist
- Mark Hamilton (canoeist) (born 1958), American sprint canoer
- Mark Hamilton (doctor) (born 1970), Irish doctor and radio show host
- Mark Hamilton (guitarist), British lead guitarist
- Mark Hamilton (police officer), Northern Ireland police officer.
- Mark Hamilton (politician) (born 1956), American politician from Georgia
- Mark Hamilton (singer), Canadian indie rock musician with Woodpigeon
- Mark Hamilton (writer), publisher of Neo-Tech literature
- Mark R. Hamilton (born 945), American academic and university president
- Friar Mark Hamilton, Scottish Dominican and authorn]
- Martin D. Hamilton (Martin Davis Hamilton) (1855–1922), American politician from San Diego
- Martin Hamilton-Smith (born 1953), Australian politician
- Marvin Hamilton (born 1988), English footballer
- Lady Mary Hamilton (1736–1821), Scottish novelist
- Mary Hamilton, Duchess of Abercorn (1848–1929), British courtier
- Mary Hamilton (activist) (1935–2002), American activist in the Civil Rights Movement
- Mary Hamilton (equestrian) (born 1954), New Zealand equestrian
- Mary Hamilton (lady in waiting) (died 1719), Scottish courtier in Russia
- Mary Hamilton (politician) (1882–1966), Scottish politician
- Mary Barbara Hamilton, known professionally as Barbara Cartland, British novelist
- Mary Christian Dundas Hamilton (1850–1943), Scottish writer and poet
- Mary Lou Graham Hamilton, baseball player
- Mary Riter Hamilton (1867–1954), Canadian painter
- Mary Hamilton, Duchess of Abercorn (1848–1929), English aristocrat
- Marylin Hamilton (born 1949), American inventor, athlete and entrepreneur
- Masha Hamilton (born 1961), American journalist and novelist
- Mathilda Hamilton (1864–1935), Swedish missionary and entrepreneur
- Matt Hamilton (curler) (born 1989), American curler
- Matt Hamilton (racing driver) (born 1990), British racing driver
- Matthew Hamilton of Milnburn (died 1564), Scottish landowner and courtier
- Maurice Hamilton (1923–1976), Canadian politician from Ontario
- Mavis Hamilton (1911–1958), Irish badminton player
- Maximilian Reichsgraf von Hamilton (1714–1776), prince bishop of Olmütz (Olomouc)
- Max Hamilton (1912–1988), German-born British medical statistician
- Mel Hamilton (fl.1969), American college football player
- Melina Hamilton (born 1976), New Zealand pole vaulter
- Melinda Page Hamilton (born 1974), American actress
- Melissa Hamilton (born 1989), Northern Irish ballet dancer
- Melissa Hamilton (author), American chef and cookbook author
- Micah Hamilton (born 2003), English footballer
- Michael Hamilton (American football) (born 1973), American football player
- Michael Hamilton (politician) (1918–2000), British politician
- Maxwell M. Hamilton (Maxwell McGaughey Hamilton) (1896–1957), American diplomat
- Michelle Hamilton (born 1948), American model
- Mike Hamilton (athletic director) (born 1963), American athletics director
- Mike Hamilton (guitarist), American guitarist, singer and songwriter
- Milo Hamilton (1927–2015), American sportscaster
- Milton H. Hamilton Jr. (1932–2008), American politician from Tennessee
- Montgomerie Hamilton (1854–1930), Australian barrister, judge and rugby union footballer
- Morgan C. Hamilton (1809–1893), American politician
- Murray Hamilton (1923–1986), American actor
- Murray Hamilton (politician) (1918–2009), Australian politician

== N ==
- Natasha Hamilton (born 1982), English singer and member of Atomic Kitten
- Natasha Hamilton-Hart (born 1969), New Zealand business academic
- Neil Hamilton (actor) (1899–1984), American actor
- Neil Hamilton (politician) (born 1949), British politician
- Neil Hamilton (lawyer) (fl. late 20th century), American lawyer and author
- Neville Hamilton (1960–2009), English footballer and coach
- Newburgh Hamilton (1691–1761), Irish writer and librettist
- Nicholas Hamilton (born 2000), Australian actor and musician
- Nicholas Hamilton (footballer) (born 1996), Jamaican footballer
- Nick Patrick (referee) (born 1959), American professional wrestling referee
- Nicolas Hamilton (born 1992), British racing driver
- Nigel Hamilton (author) (born 1944), British-born biographer, academic and broadcaster
- Nigel Hamilton (civil servant) (born 1948), head of the Northern Ireland Civil Service
- Norah Hamilton (1873–1945), American artist
- Norman Hamilton (minister) (born 1946), Moderator of the Presbyterian Church in Ireland
- N. Gregory Hamilton (Norman Gregory Hamilton) (born 1945), American psychiatrist and author
- Norman R. Hamilton (1877–1964), American politician
- Normani Hamilton, known professionally as Normani (born 1996), American singer

== O ==
- Olivia Hamilton (field hockey) (born 2001), English field hockey player
- Olivia Hamilton (born 1987), American actress and producer
- Otho Hamilton (c.1690–1770), Scottish military officer and political figure in Nova Scotia
- Owen Hamilton (born 1959), Jamaican middle-distance runner

== P ==
- Page Hamilton (born 1960), American guitarist, singer and record producer
- Pamela Coke-Hamilton, Jamaican lawyer and trade expert
- Paris Hamilton (born 1981), American football player
- Patricia Hamilton (1937–2023), Canadian actress
- Patrick Hamilton of Kincavil (died 1520), Scottish nobleman
- Patrick Hamilton (martyr) (1504–1528), Scottish Protestant reformer and son of the above
- Patrick Hamilton (poet) (c.1575–1658), Church of Scotland minister and poet
- Patrick Hamilton (writer) (1904–1962), English novelist and playwright
- Patrick Omolade Hamilton (born 1948), Sierra Leone judge
- Paul Hamilton (American football) (born 1958), American football player and coach
- Paul Hamilton (architect) (1924–2004), British architect
- Paul Hamilton (Australian footballer) (born 1967), Australian rules footballer
- Paul Hamilton (footballer, born 1941) (1941–2017), Nigerian footballer and manager
- Paul Hamilton (politician) (1762–1816), United States Secretary of the Navy and governor of South Carolina
- Paul Hamilton (soccer) (born 1988), Canadian soccer player
- Paula Hamilton (born 1960), British model
- Paulette Hamilton (born 1962/3), British politician
- Pauline Kruger Hamilton (1870–1919), American photographer
- Peggy Hamilton (1894–1984), American fashion and costume designer
- Peggy-Kay Hamilton (1922–1959), American geologist
- Penny Rafferty Hamilton (born 1948), American pilot, aviation educator and photographer
- Pep Hamilton (born 1974), American football coach
- Pete Hamilton (1942–2017), American race car driver
- Peter Hamilton (diplomat), New Zealand diplomat
- Peter Hamilton (editor), Scottish editor of Nebula Science Fiction
- Peter Hamilton (footballer, born 1931) (1931–1981), Australian rules footballer for North Melbourne
- Peter Hamilton (footballer, born 1956) (1956–2019), Australian rules footballer for Melbourne
- Peter Hunter Hamilton (1800–1857), Canadian businessman, a founder of Hamilton, Ontario
- Peter F. Hamilton (born 1960), English science-fiction writer
- Peter J. Hamilton (1859–1927), American lawyer, historian and Puerto Rico federal judge from Alabama
- Phil Hamilton (born 1952), American politician from Virginia
- Philip Hamilton (1782–1801), son of Alexander Hamilton, dueling fatality
- Philip Hamilton (lawyer) (1802–1884), American lawyer, son of Alexander Hamilton
- Philippe Hamilton-Rollings (born 1993), Ukrainian football player
- Phillip Hamilton (born 1961), American historical writer
- Phyllis J. Hamilton (born 1952), American judge
- Priscilla Hamilton known professionally as Muni Long (born 1988), American singer and songwriter
- Pierpont M. Hamilton (1898–1982), United States Army Air Force officer
- Pud Hamilton (William Hamilton) (1874–1965), Canadian ice hockey player

== Q ==
- Quancetia Hamilton, Canadian actress
- Quincy Hamilton (born 1998), American baseball player

== R ==
- Rachael Hamilton (born 1970), Scottish politician
- Rachel Hamilton (1829–1899), Irish special constable in Glasgow
- Rainy Hamilton Jr. (born 1956), American architect
- Ralph Hamilton (1921–1993), American basketball player
- R. S. Hamilton (Ralph Scott Hamilton) (1879–1960), American politician from Oregon
- Ray Hamilton (defensive end) (1916–1995), American football player
- Ray Hamilton (defensive tackle) (born 1951), American football player and coach
- Ray Hamilton (tight end) (born 1992), American football player
- Raymond Hamilton (1913–1935), American gangster
- Raymond Hamilton (politician) (1909–1975), Australian politician
- Raymond Hamilton (soccer) (fl.1937), American soccer player
- Rebecca Hamilton (politician) (born 1948), American politician from Oklahoma
- Reg Hamilton (1914–1991), Canadian ice hockey player
- Reggie Hamilton (born 1989), American basketball player
- Remy Hamilton (born 1974), American football player
- Rex Hamilton (1928–2010), New Zealand sport shooter
- Richard Hamilton (actor) (1920–2004), American actor
- Richard Hamilton (artist) (1922–2011), British painter and collage artist
- Richard Hamilton (BBC journalist), author of 2011 book The Last Storytellers
- Richard Hamilton (basketball) (born 1978), American basketball player
- Richard Hamilton (boxer) (born 1967), Jamaican boxer
- Richard Hamilton (Medal of Honor) (1836–1881), American Civil War sailor
- Richard Hamilton (mining) (1855–1943), mine manager at Boulder, Western Australia
- Richard Hamilton (murderer) (1963–2023), American convicted murderer
- Richard Hamilton (officer) (died 1717), Irish officer
- Richard Hamilton (rower) (born 1973), British rower
- Richard Hamilton (winemaker) (1792–1852), founder of winery in South Australia
- Richard Vesey Hamilton (1829–1912), British admiral and First Naval Lord
- Richard J. Hamilton (1799–1860), American judge and politician
- Richard S. Hamilton (1943–2024), American mathematician
- James Hamilton, 4th Baron Hamilton of Dalzell (1938–2006), British hereditary peer
- Richard Hamilton, 4th Viscount Boyne (1724–1789), Irish Member of Parliament for Navan
- Richard Hamilton-Wickes (1901–1963), English rugby union footballet
- Rick Hamilton (Richard R. Hamilton, born 1970), American football player
- Robert Hamilton, Lord Presmennan (1633–1689), Scottish landowner and judge
- Robert Hamilton of Briggis (died 1568), Scottish soldier and military engineer
- Robert Hamilton of Preston (1650–1701), one of the leaders of the Scottish Covenanters, baronet
- Robert Hamilton (advocate) (1763–1831), Scottish advocate and friend of Sir Walter Scott
- Robert Hamilton (archaeologist) (1905–1995), British archaeologist and academic
- Robert Hamilton (bishop) (c.1600–1649), Church of Scotland bishop of Caithness
- Robert Hamilton (civil servant) (1836–1895), Australian politician, governor of Tasmania
- Robert Hamilton (congressman) (1809–1878), American politician from New Jersey
- Robert Hamilton (economist) (1743–1829), Scottish economist and mathematician
- Robert Hamilton (Irish footballer) (1903–1964), Northern Irish footballer who played for Rangers F.C.
- Robert Hamilton (Irish physician) (1749–1830)
- Robert Hamilton (judge) (1753–1809), judge and political figure in Upper Canada
- Robert Hamilton (Liberal politician) (1867–1944), Scottish Member of Parliament for Orkney and Shetland
- Robert Hamilton (merchant) (1787–1856), political figure in Upper Canada
- Robert Hamilton (moderator, died 1581) (c.1530–1581), Church of Scotland minister, moderator of the General Assembly in 1572
- Robert Hamilton (moderator, died 1787) (1707–1787), twice moderator of the General Assembly of the Church of Scotland
- Robert Hamilton (Northwest Territories politician) (1842–1911), Canadian immigration agent and politician
- Robert Hamilton (Norwegian governor) (died 1677), Scottish-Norwegian military officer and governor
- Robert Hamilton (priest) (1853–1928), dean of Armagh
- Robert Hamilton (rugby union) (1870–1946), Irish rugby union footballer
- Robert Hamilton (Scottish footballer) (1877–1948), Scottish footballer
- Robert Hamilton (Scottish physician) (1721–1793), Scottish physician
- Robert Hamilton (surgeon) (died c.1832), president of the Royal College of Surgeons in Ireland
- Robert Bell Hamilton (1892–1948), Australian architect and politician from Victoria
- R. H. Hamilton (Robert Houston Hamilton) (1873–1946), American college football coach, law professor and judge
- Robert Ray Hamilton (1851–1890), American politician
- Robert Wilson Hamilton (1819–1904), American-born lawyer and judge in Fiji
- Robert William Hamilton Jr. (1930–2011), American hyperbaric physiologist
- Robert J. Hamilton (active since 2003), Canadian politician from Ontario
- Robert K. Hamilton (1905–1986), American politician from Pennsylvania
- Robert S. Hamilton (1865–1940), American politician from Illinois
- Robert W. Hamilton (judge) (1899–1981), justice of the Supreme Court of Texas
- Robert W. Hamilton (law professor) (1931–2018), American legal scholar
- Sir Robert Hamilton, 1st Baronet (died 1703), Anglo-Irish official in Ireland
- Sir Robert Hamilton, 6th Baronet (1802–1887), British politician and East India Company civil servant
- Robert Hamilton, 8th Lord Belhaven and Stenton (1793–1868), Scottish peer
- Robert Hamilton, 12th Lord Belhaven and Stenton (1903–1961), Scottish peer
- Robert Nisbet-Hamilton (1804–1877), British politician
- Robert Shaw-Hamilton (1840–1908), Irish cleric, Dean of Armagh
- Robert Udny-Hamilton, 11th Lord Belhaven and Stenton (1871–1950), Scottish representative peer and soldier
- Robin Hamilton (politician), American politician from Montana
- Robin N. Hamilton (Robin Nicole Hamilton), American journalist, writer and television host
- Rod Hamilton (born March 25, 1968), American politician from Minnesota
- Rodney Hamilton (born 1975), American basketball player and coach
- Roger J. Hamilton (born 1968), Singapore-based author and social entrepreneur.
- Roland Hamilton (1886–1953), British politician
- Rollin Hamilton (1898–1951), American animator
- Romie Hamilton (1922–2005), American football coach.
- Ronald Hamilton, American operatic tenor
- Ron Hamilton known as Ki-Ke-In (born 1948), Canadian Hupacasath First Nation cultural figure
- Ron Hamilton (musician) (1950–2023), American Christian musician and preacher
- Ronnie Hamilton (born 1945), Scottish footballer
- Rory Hamilton-Brown (born 1987), English cricketer
- Rosalea Hamilton, Jamaican academic, trade policy specialist
- Rosalind Hamilton, Duchess of Abercorn (1869–1958), wife of James, Marquess of Hamilton
- Ross Hamilton (c.1843–1901), American politician from Virginia
- Roy Hamilton (1929–1969), American singer
- Roy Hamilton III, American record producer and songwriter
- Roy "Royalty" Hamilton (born 1980), American songwriter
- Roy Hamilton (basketball) (born 1957), American basketball player and sports television producer
- Roy Hamilton (physician) (born 1973), American neurologist
- Ruel Hamilton, American author, businessman and political activist
- Ruffin Hamilton (born 1971), American football player
- Russ Hamilton (poker player) (born 1948/9), American poker champion
- Russ Hamilton (singer) (1932–2008), English songwriter and performer
- Russell Hamilton (singer-songwriter) (born 1969), American singer-songwriter; stage name "Russell"
- Russell G. Hamilton (1934–2016), American author
- Ruth Hamilton (1898–2008), American radio talk show host and politician from New Hampshire
- Ryan Hamilton (comedian) (born 1976), North American stand-up comedian
- Ryan Hamilton (ice hockey) (born 1985), Canadian ice hockey player
- Ryan Hamilton (Massachusetts politician), American politician from Massachusetts
- Ryan Hamilton (New Zealand politician) (born 1979/80), New Zealand politician
- Ryan Hamilton (rugby union) (born 1988), Canadian rugby union footballer

== S ==
- Sackville Hamilton (1732–1818), Anglo-Irish politician
- Sally Hamilton-Fleming (born 1961), Australian hurdler
- Sam Hamilton (1955–2010), American official
- Sam Hamilton (soccer) (born 1995), American soccer player
- Samantha Hamilton (born 1973), Australian baseball player
- Samuel Hamilton (1902–1925), Irish soccer player
- Samuel Warren Hamilton (1878–1951), American physician and psychiatrist
- Sandy Hamilton, American real estate broker and politician from Illinois
- Sarah Hamilton (actress), Irish actress and singer of the 18th century
- Sarah Hamilton (historian), British historian
- Saskia Hamilton (1967–2023), American poet, editor and academic
- Schuyler Hamilton (1822–1903), American soldier and engineer
- Schuyler Hamilton Jr. (1853–1907), American architect
- Scott Hamilton (figure skater) (born 1958), American figure skater
- Scott Hamilton (musician) (born 1954), American jazz saxophonist
- Scott Hamilton (politician) (born 1958), Canadian politician from British Columbia
- Scott Hamilton (rugby union) (born 1980), New Zealand rugby union footballer
- Scotty Hamilton (1921–1976), American basketball player and coach
- Sean Hamilton (born 1970), American radio host
- Shane Hamilton (born 1970), Australian rules footballer
- Shaun Dion Hamilton (born 1995), American football player
- Sherman Hamilton (born 1972), Canadian basketball player
- Shorty Hamilton (1879–1925), American actor and silent film comedian
- Simi Hamilton (born 1987), American cross-country skier
- Simon Hamilton (born 1977), Northern Ireland businessman, consultant and politician
- Simon Hamilton (officer), British general
- Sophie Hamilton (born 2001), English field hockey player
- Sophie Caldwell Hamilton (born 1990), American cross-country ski racer
- Stefanie Hamilton (1819–1894), Swedish court official
- Stephanie Stahl Hamilton, American politician and minister from Arizona
- Steve Hamilton (American football) (born 1961), American football player
- Steve Hamilton (author) (born 1961), American detective novel writer
- Steve Hamilton (broadcaster) (Roland James Hamilton) (1950–2009), Scottish broadcaster
- Steve Hamilton (sportsman, born 1934) (1934–1997), American baseball and basketball player
- Steven Hamilton (born 1970), Australian rules footballer
- Steven Hamilton (footballer) (born 1975), Scottish footballer
- Stuart Hamilton (1929–2017), Canadian classical pianist and opera producer
- Stuart Hamilton (footballer) (1918–1990), Australian rules footballer
- Stuart Hamilton (public servant) (born 1950), Australian public servant and CEO
- Sydney Hamilton (1896–1974), American vaudeville actress
- Sue Hamilton (actress) (1945–1969), American model and actress
- Sue Hamilton (archaeologist), British specialist in prehistory
- Sunny Jim Hamilton (fl. 1911), American baseball player
- Lady Susan Hamilton (1814–1889), daughter of Susan Hamilton, Duchess of Hamilton
- Susan Hamilton (soprano) (born 1970), Scottish singer
- Susan Hamilton, Duchess of Hamilton (1786–1859), wife of Alexander Hamilton, 10th Duke of Hamilton
- Susi Hamilton, American politician from North Carolina
- Susie Hamilton (born 1950), English artist
- Susie Estella Palmer Hamilton (1862–1942), American suffragist and activist
- Suzanna Hamilton (born 1960), English actress
- Suzy Favor Hamilton (born 1968), American middle-distance runner
- Sylvia Hamilton, Canadian filmmaker and writer

== T ==
- Tang Hamilton (born 1978), American basketball player
- Tanya Hamilton, American film director and producer
- Ted Hamilton (born 1937), Australian singer-songwriter and actor
- Ted Hamilton (baseball), American baseball pitcher of the 1920s
- Teresa Hamilton (1852–1932), British activist and social reformer
- Thomas Hamilton, Lord Priestfield (c.1535–1611), Scottish judge
- Thomas Hamilton (architect) (1784–1858), Scottish architect, son of Thomas Hamilton (1754–1824), also an architect
- Thomas Hamilton (basketball) (born 1975), American basketball player
- Thomas Hamilton (cricketer, born 1992), English cricketer
- Thomas Hamilton (footballer, born 1872) (1872–1942), Scottish footballer
- Thomas Hamilton (footballer, born 1906) (1906–1964), Scottish footballer
- Thomas Hamilton (university administrator) (1842–1926), Irish cleric and academic
- Thomas Hamilton (writer) (1789–1842), Scottish philosopher and author
- Thomas de Courcy Hamilton (1825–1908), Scottish recipient of the Victoria Cross
- Thomas Ferrier Hamilton (1820–1905), Australian pastoralist, politician and cricketer
- Thomas Glendenning Hamilton (1873–1935), Canadian doctor and politician
- Thomas Watt Hamilton (1952–1996), perpetrator of the Dunblane massacre
- Thomas Kinley Hamilton (1853–1917), Irish doctor and land speculator in Australia
- Thomas F. Hamilton (1894–1969), American aviator and founder of the Hamilton Standard Company
- Thomas H. Hamilton (Thomas Hale Hamilton) (1914–1979), American academic administrator
- Thomas W. Hamilton (Medal of Honor) (1833–1869), United States Navy Medal of Honor recipient
- Thomas Wm. Hamilton (born 1939), namesake of asteroid 4897 Tomhamilton
- Thomas Hamilton, 1st Earl of Haddington (1563–1637), Scottish administrator, Lord Advocate and judge
- Thomas Hamilton, 2nd Earl of Haddington (1600–1640), Scottish nobleman
- Thomas Hamilton, 3rd Earl of Haddington (1626–1645), Scottish nobleman
- Thomas Hamilton, 6th Earl of Haddington (1680–1735), Scottish politician and nobleman
- Thomas Hamilton, 7th Earl of Haddington (1721–1794), Scottish nobleman
- Thomas Hamilton, 9th Earl of Haddington (1780–1858), British politician
- Thomas Hamilton-Brown (1916–1981), South African boxer
- Tim Hamilton (designer), American fashion designer
- Tim Hamilton (equestrian), Canadian paralympic equestrian
- Todd Hamilton (born 1965), American golfer
- Tom Hamilton Jr. (born 1978), American songwriter, musician and producer
- Tom Hamilton (American football) (1905–1994), American football player, coach, college athletics administrator and naval aviator
- Tom Hamilton (baseball) (1925–1973), American baseball player
- Tom Hamilton (electronic musician), American pop/electro/rock musician
- Tom Hamilton (footballer, born 1893) (1893–1959), Scottish footballer
- Tom Hamilton (musician) (born 1951), American bassist with Aerosmith
- Tom Hamilton (politician) (born 1954), Unionist politician in Northern Ireland
- Tom Hamilton (sportscaster) (born 1954), American radio play-by-play baseball announcer
- Tommy Hamilton (1935–2025), Irish soccer player
- Tony Hamilton-Bram (born 1966), English football manager
- Treneese Hamilton (born 2003), Dominican shot putter and hammer thrower
- Trevor Hamilton (born 1982), Northern Irish convicted murderer
- Tova Hamilton, Jamaican attorney and politician
- Ty Hamilton (born 2002), American football player
- Tyler Hamilton (born 1971), American road bicycle racer
- Tyler Hamilton (footballer) (born 1999), English footballer
- Tyler Hamilton (reporter) (born 1970), Canadian reporter
- Tyler Hamilton (singer), Canadian pop singer

== V ==
- Venson Hamilton (born 1977), American-Spanish basketball player
- Vera Hamilton (1945–2013), American soul singer
- Vereker Monteith Hamilton (1856–1931), Scottish painter of military and historical works
- Vernon Hamilton (born 1984), American basketball player
- Vesey Hamilton (1829–1912), Royal Navy officer
- Vicky Hamilton (born 1958), American record executive, documentary filmmaker and artist
- Vicky Hamilton (musician) (died 1971), American jazz singer-songwriter and composer
- Victor Norris Hamilton (1919–1997), American cryptologist and defector
- Victor P. Hamilton (born 1941), Canadian-American biblical scholar
- Victoria Hamilton (born 1971), British actress
- Victoria Hamilton-Barritt (born 1982), English actress and singer
- Vince Hamilton (1916–1989), Australian rules footballer
- Violet Hamilton (1949–2014), Singaporean photographer
- Virginia Hamilton (1936–2002), American children's books author

== W ==
- W. Hamilton (fl.1899), American college football player
- W. O. Hamilton, American athletics coach
- Wacey Hamilton (born 1990), Canadian ice hockey player
- Wade Hamilton (born 1994), American soccer goalkeeper
- Walker Hamilton (1934–1969), Scottish writer
- Wallace Hamilton (died 1983), American novelist and playwright
- Walter Hamilton (airline executive) (1901–1946), American airline pioneer
- Walter Hamilton (Master of Magdalene College) (1908–1988), British schoolmaster and college head
- Walter Hamilton (politician) (1863–1955), Australian politician
- Walter Hamilton (VC) (1856–1879), British Indian Army officer and recipient of the Victoria Cross
- Walter Ferrier Hamilton (1819–1872), British politician
- Walter Kerr Hamilton (1808–1869), Anglican Bishop of Salisbury
- Walter Richard Pollock Hamilton (1856–1879), Irish recipient of the Victoria Cross
- Walton Hale Hamilton (1881–1958), American law professor
- Warren Hamilton, American military officer and politician from Oklahoma
- Warren B. Hamilton (1925–2018), American geologist
- Wendy Hamilton (model), model
- Wendy Hamilton (politician), 2022 candidate for District of Columbia's at-large congressional district
- Wes Hamilton (born 1953), American football player
- West A. Hamilton (c. 1886–1985), American teacher, military officer, newspaper publisher and civic leader
- Wilbert Hamilton (1897–1964), Canadian politician from Ottawa
- Wilbur H. Hamilton (1909–1964), American businessman and politician
- Wilfred Hamilton-Shimmen, British business executive and writer based in Singapore
- William Hamilton of Sanquhar (c.1510–1570), pursemaster for James V of Scotland
- Lord William Hamilton (c.1706–1734), Scottish Member of Parliament for Lanarkshire
- William Hamilton (abolitionist) (1773–1836), African-American abolitionist and orator
- William Hamilton (actor), Irish actor of the 18th century
- William Hamilton (antiquarian) (died 1724), Scottish topographer and genealogist, grandfather of William Gerard Hamilton
- William Hamilton (sprinter) (1883–1955), 1908 Olympic gold medalist
- William Hamilton (Australian politician) (1858–1920), Queensland politician
- William Hamilton (British Army officer) (c.1896–1917), British poet and soldier
- William Hamilton (cartoonist) (1939–2016), American cartoonist associated with The New Yorker
- William Hamilton (comic poet) (c.1665–1751), Scottish poet
- William Hamilton (cricketer) (1859–1914), Irish cricketer
- William Hamilton (criminal), criminal who shot at Queen Victoria in 1849
- William Hamilton (cyclist) (1930–2017), Canadian cyclist
- William Hamilton (diplomat) (1730–1803), Scottish diplomat and husband of Emma Hamilton
- William Hamilton (equestrian) (1921–2007), Swedish equestrian
- William Hamilton (film editor) (1893–1942), American film editor
- William Hamilton (Flint politician) (died 1878), American politician from Michigan
- William Hamilton (footballer) (1904–1984), Scottish footballer
- William Hamilton (geologist) (1805–1867), English geologist
- William Hamilton (Irish minister) (1755–1797), Irish Protestant minister, geologist, meteorologist and antiquarian
- William Hamilton (Jacobite poet) (1704–1754), Scottish poet associated with the Jacobite movement
- William Hamilton (Lord Chancellor) (died 1307), Lord Chancellor of England
- William Hamilton (lumber baron) (died 1822), lumber merchant and political figure in Upper Canada
- William Hamilton (painter) (1751–1801), English painter
- William Hamilton (physician) (1758–1790), Scottish physician and botanist
- William Hamilton (priest), Archdeacon of Armagh from 1700 to 1730
- William Hamilton (rugby union) (1850–1931), Irish rugby union footballer
- William Hamilton (sport shooter) (1884–1939), Canadian competitive shooter
- William Hamilton (sportsman) (1859–1914), Irish cricketer and soccer player
- William Hamilton (surgeon) (died 1717), surgeon in the British East India Company
- William Hamilton (tennis player) (1869–1943), Irish tennis player
- William Hamilton (theologian) (1924–2012), American theologian
- William Hamilton (university principal) (1669–1732), minister of the Church of Scotland, divine, Principal of the University of Edinburgh
- William Baskerville Hamilton (1908–1972), American historian
- W. Cayley Hamilton (William Cayley Hamilton) (c. 1858–1901), Canadian barrister and politician
- W. D. Hamilton (William Donald Hamilton) (1936–2000), British evolutionary biologist and geneticist
- William Baskerville Hamilton (1908–1972), American historian
- William Edwin Hamilton (1834–1902), son of William Rowan and publisher of his Elements of Quaternions (1866)
- William Ernest Hamilton (1902–1985), Canadian politician from Ontario
- William Gerard Hamilton (1729–1796), British politician
- William John Warburton Hamilton (1825–1883), administrator, explorer and politician in New Zealand
- William McLean Hamilton (1919–1989), Canadian politician
- William Peter Hamilton (1867–1929), Wall Street Journal editor
- William Richard Hamilton (1777–1859), English antiquarian and traveller
- William Rowan Hamilton (1805–1865), Irish mathematician, astronomer and physicist
- William Thomas Hamilton (1820–1888), Governor of Maryland (1880–1884)
- William Thomas Hamilton (frontiersman) (1822–1908), American frontiersman and author
- William F. Hamilton (physician) (1893–1964), American physician
- William F. Hamilton (professor) (born 1941), American management consultant and academic
- William G. Hamilton (1932–2022), American physician
- William J. Hamilton (1932–2019), American politician
- William O. Hamilton (William Oliver Hamilton) (1876–1951), American basketball coach, track coach and college athletics administrator
- William S. Hamilton (1797–1850), American miner, politician and commander, son of Alexander Hamilton
- William T. Hamilton (1820–1888), American politician from Maryland
- William W. Hamilton (1810–1866), American politician from Iowa
- Sir William Hamilton, 9th Baronet (1788–1856), Scottish metaphysician
- William Hamilton, 2nd Duke of Hamilton (1616–1651), Scottish nobleman
- William Hamilton, Duke of Hamilton (1635–1694), Scottish nobleman
- William Hamilton, 11th Duke of Hamilton (1811–1863), Scottish nobleman
- Willie Hamilton (1917–2000), British politician
- Willie Hamilton (doctor) (born 1958), British oncologist
- Willie Hamilton (footballer, born 1938) (1938–1976), Scottish footballer
- Willie Hamilton (footballer, born 1889) (1889–1921), Scottish footballer
- Willoughby Hamilton (1864–1943), Irish tennis player
- Willoughby Hamilton (born 1907) (1907–1971), Irish badminton player, nephew of the tennis player
- Wilson H. Hamilton (1877–1949), American judge from Iowa
- Woodrow Hamilton (born 1992), American football player

== Y ==
- Yolanda Hamilton (footballer) (born 1987), Jamaican footballer

== Z ==
- Zendon Hamilton (born 1975), American basketball player and coach

== See also ==
- Hamilton family, Scottish-American family
- de Hamilton, surname
- Baillie-Hamilton, surname
- Cole-Hamilton, surname
- Dalrymple-Hamilton, surname
- Douglas-Hamilton, surname
- Baillie-Hamilton, surname
- Hamilton-Baillie, surname
- Hamilton-Gordon, surname
- Hamilton-Russell, surname
- Hamilton-Temple-Blackwood, surname
