= Romie =

Romie may refer to:

People

- Fahda Romie (born 1993), Jamaican rapper and songwriter
- Romie Adanza (born 1979), American kickboxer
- Romie Hamilton (1922–2005), American football coach
- Romie J. Palmer (1921–2014), American politician and jurist

Places

- Romie, California, former name of Fort Romie, California, United States

See also

- Romie-0 and Julie-8, 1979 Canadian animated television special
