= W. J. Hamilton =

W. J. Hamilton may refer to:

- Wendy J. Hamilton, American anti-drink drive campaigner
- William (John) Hamilton (1805–1867), English geologist
- William J. Hamilton, (born 1932), American Democratic Party politician from New Jersey
- W. J. W. Hamilton (1825–1883), New Zealand public servant and part-owner of the Lyttelton Times

== See also ==
- Hamilton (surname)
