= Bruce Hamilton =

Bruce Hamilton may refer to:

- Bruce Hamilton (writer) (1900–1974), English novelist
- Bruce Hamilton (British Army officer) (1857–1936), British general
- Bruce Hamilton (cricketer) (born 1932), New Zealand cricketer
- Bruce Hamilton (ice hockey) (born 1957), Canadian ice hockey executive
- Bruce Hamilton (ophthalmologist) (1901–1968), Australian ophthalmologist
- Bruce Hamilton (public servant) (1911–1989), Australian senior public servant
- Bruce Hamilton (rugby union) (born 1923), Australian rugby player
