= Hamilton-Russell =

Hamilton-Russell is a surname, and may refer to:

- Edric Hamilton-Russell (1904–1984), British mining engineer and rower
- Gustavus Hamilton-Russell, 10th Viscount Boyne (1931–1995), Irish peer
- Richard Gustavus Hamilton-Russell (1909–1999), Irish peer, soldier and polo player

== See also ==
- Hamilton (surname)
- Russell (surname)
