= Dalrymple-Hamilton =

Dalrymple-Hamilton is a surname, and may refer to:

- Frederick Dalrymple-Hamilton (1890–1974), British admiral
- Sir Hew Dalrymple-Hamilton, 4th Baronet (1774–1834), Scottish politician
- North Dalrymple-Hamilton (1922–2014), Royal Navy officer
- North Dalrymple-Hamilton (British Army officer) (1883–1953), Scottish British Army officer and writer

== See also ==
- Dalrymple (surname)
- Hamilton (surname)
