= Robert Hamilton (Scottish physician) =

Scottish physician

- Born: 6 December 1721; Edinburgh
- Died: 9 November 1793 (aged 71)
- Occupation: Physician

Robert Hamilton (6 December 1721 – 9 November 1793) was a Scottish physician.

== Biography ==
Hamilton of Lynn, was born at Edinburgh 6 December 1721, and educated at the high school. He was apprenticed to William Edmonston, surgeon-apothecary of Leith, and attended the medical lectures. In 1741 he entered the navy as surgeon's mate, and remained in the service until 1748, occasionally attending the lectures of William Hunter and of William Smellie in London. Having settled at King's Lynn, he acquired a good practice, and was consulted by patients from a distance. He was a fellow of the Royal College of Physicians at Edinburgh, and a member of several other learned societies. In 1773 he sent to the Royal Society of Edinburgh a paper on mumps (printed in vol. ii. of the 'Transactions,' 1790). Another paper, on a case of tapping the bladder per rectum, is printed in the 'Philosophical Transactions,' lxvi. (1776). His longest essay is 'Observations on Scrophulous Affections, with remarks on Schirrus (sic) Cancer and Rachitis,' communicated to the Medical Society of London, but published by himself, London, 1791. He died 9 November 1793. Two works bearing his name were published posthumously, 'Observations on the Marsh Remittent Fever, on Water Canker and Leprosy, with Memoir of the Author's Life' London, 1801, and 'Letters on the Cause and Treatment of the Gout,' Lynn, 1806. In most works of reference he is confused and combined with his contemporary of the same name who practised at Ipswich.
