= De Hamilton =

de Hamilton is a surname, and may refer to:

- Johann Georg de Hamilton (1672–1737), painter from the Southern Netherlands
- Karl Wilhelm de Hamilton (1668–1754), Brussels-born painter
- Philipp Ferdinand de Hamilton (c.1664–1750), painter from the Southern Netherlands

== See also ==
- Hamilton (surname)
