= Wilfred Hamilton-Shimmen =

Wilfred Hamilton-Shimmen is a British executive director based in Singapore.

== Biography ==
Shimmen was born in Singapore and as an infant, was interned with his mother at the Japanese Internment Camp at the Sime Road Camp in Singapore during World War II. His father, a British naval base administrator in Singapore, was executed by Japanese.

Shimmen wrote a poem, The Reef, which was published by Illustrated Weekly of India on 7 June 1959) and Merdeka Bridge (which was published in The Seed in 1961 - a publication of the Malaysian Sociological Research Institute).

After leaving Singapore for London in 1980, Shimmen returned to Singapore to research for his book.

In 1994, Shimmen published a novel, Seasons of Darkness, which is about the experiences of a Eurasian living in Singapore which are mostly based on his own experiences.

Shimmen owns a public relations company, of which he is executive director, in Singapore.

== Personal life ==
Around 1980, Shimmen gave up his Singaporean citizenship for British citizenship.
