= Russell Hamilton (singer-songwriter) =

Russell Dean Hamilton
- Birth name: Russell D. Hamilton
- Born: August 8, 1969 (age 55); Cleveland, Ohio, United States
- Genres: R&B,
- Years active: 2001–2005
- Labels: EMI

Russell Hamilton (born August 8, 1969), better known by his stage name "Russell", is an American singer-songwriter, record producer and entrepreneur. Russell is an R&B singer. Russell's only album is titled When I'm With You, and featured a duet with R&B singer, R. Kelly. The song titled "Rich Man" reached No. 9 on the Billboard Hot R&B/Hip-Hop Songs chart.
