= John Hamilton (painter) =

British painter

- Occupation: Painter

John Hamilton (fl. 1765–1786) was a British painter.

== Biography ==
Hamilton is stated to have been an amateur. He was a member of the Incorporated Society of Artists, and subscribed to their roll-declaration in 1766. In 1767 he contributed a moonlight view to their exhibition, and continued to exhibit landscapes and views up to 1777. In 1773 he was director of the society and afterwards vice-president. In the print room at the British Museum there was a water-colour drawing by him of Tyburn during the execution of William Guest on 14 October 1767. Hamilton also etched with good effect the plates to Francis Grose's 'Ancient Armour and Weapons,' published in 1786.
