= Hamilton-Temple-Blackwood =

Hamilton-Temple-Blackwood is a surname, and may refer to:

- Basil Hamilton-Temple-Blackwood, 4th Marquess of Dufferin and Ava (1909–1945), British soldier and politician
- Caroline Maureen Hamilton-Temple-Blackwood, known as Lady Caroline Blackwood (1931–1996), English writer
- Frederick Hamilton-Temple-Blackwood, 1st Marquess of Dufferin and Ava (1826–1902), Governor General of Canada and Viceroy of India
- Frederick Hamilton-Temple-Blackwood, 3rd Marquess of Dufferin and Ava (1875–1930), British soldier and senator of the Northern Ireland Parliament
- Hariot Hamilton-Temple-Blackwood, Marchioness of Dufferin and Ava (1843–1936), British Vicereine of India
- Lord Ian Basil Gawaine Hamilton-Temple-Blackwood, known as Basil Temple Blackwood (1870–1917), British lawyer and civil servant
- Lindy Hamilton-Temple-Blackwood, Marchioness of Dufferin and Ava (1941–2020), British artist, conservationist and businesswoman
- Maureen Constance Hamilton-Temple-Blackwood, Marchioness of Dufferin and Ava, née Maureen Constance Guinness (1907–1998), Anglo-Irish socialite
- Sheridan Hamilton-Temple-Blackwood, 5th Marquess of Dufferin and Ava (1938–1988), British patron of the arts
- Terence John Temple Hamilton-Temple-Blackwood, 2nd Marquess of Dufferin and Ava (1866–1918), British diplomat
- Victoria Alexandrina Hamilton-Temple-Blackwood, married name Victoria May, Baroness Plunket (1873–1968), British nursing association founder and Vicereine of New Zealand
