= Harry Hamilton (politician) =

American politician

Member of the Washington House of Representatives
- In office 1889–1891

Personal details
- Party: Republican

Harry Hamilton was an American politician in the state of Washington. He served in the Washington House of Representatives from 1889 to 1891.
