= William Hamilton (priest) =

Irish Anglican cleric

William Hamilton was Archdeacon of Armagh from 1700 to 1730.

Hewetson was born in Caledon, County Tyrone and educated at Trinity College, Dublin and Wadham College, Oxford. His brother was Archdeacon of Raphoe for 64 years.
