= John Hamilton (footballer, born 1946) =

Australian rules footballer

Personal information
- Full name: John Hamilton
- Born: 9 December 1946
- Died: 22 September 2007 (aged 60)
- Original team: Old Launcestonians
- Height: 183 cm (6 ft 0 in)
- Weight: 73.5 kg (162 lb)

Playing career^{1}
Years	Club	Games (Goals)
1966	Melbourne	2 (0)
- ^{1} Playing statistics correct to the end of 1966.

John Hamilton (9 December 1946 – 22 September 2007) was an Australian rules footballer who played with Melbourne in the Victorian Football League (VFL).
