= Estelle Brown Hamilton =

American entrepreneur and educator (1883–1933)

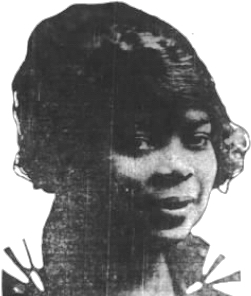
- Born: Estelle Brown; November 28, 1883; Savannah, Georgia
- Died: August 19, 1933 (aged 49); New York
- Other names: Mme. Estelle, Estelle Hamilton Daniels
- Occupations: Entrepreneur, educator

Estelle Brown Hamilton (November 28, 1883 – August 19, 1933), known as Mme. Estelle, was an American entrepreneur and educator, president of the Nu-Life Beauty College in Harlem in the 1920s.

== Early life ==
Estelle Brown was born in Savannah, Georgia, in 1883, the daughter of Abraham Brown and Marion Marshall Brown. She married in 1902, to William Henry Hamilton; he died in 1909, and she moved to New York to train as a beautician.

== Career ==
As "Mme. Estelle", Hamilton was president of the Nu-Life Beauty College in Harlem, training hair stylists in the science and culture of black skin, scalp, and hair. By 1924, she had "hundreds of agents... all over the country", graduates of her program who sold her goods and used her methods. She was the first president of the National Beauty Culturists' League, and in 1928 addressed over 500 league members at the annual convention in Chicago, on the importance of complying with a new wave of state regulations of the beauty industry. Her business suffered with the onset of the Great Depression, and with the coincidence of two injuries to Hamilton herself: she was burned in her laboratory, and she was "struck by a taxi".

Hamilton was also a noted social hostess in Harlem in the 1920s. In 1925 she hosted a benefit concert at the Abyssinian Baptist Church, for an "old folks' home" in Harlem. She retired to Jamaica, Long Island, in 1931.

== Personal life ==
Hamilton married again, to William W. Daniels. She died in New York in August 1933, aged 49 years, leaving a daughter, Wilhelmina L. D. Clarke. Adam Clayton Powell Sr. presided at her memorial service. Clarke renewed her mother's trademark to a hair pomade in 1936.
