= Anna Hamilton =

French medical doctor (1864–1935)

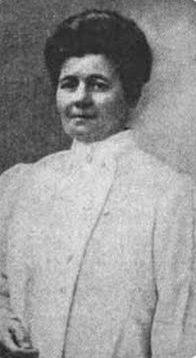
Anna Hamilton, from a 1919 publication.

Anna Hamilton (22 May 1864 – 19 October 1935) was a French medical doctor, superintendent of the Protestant Hospital in Bordeaux for 34 years, and a proponent of professionalization in nursing.

== Early life ==
Anna-Emilie Hamilton was born in Fiesole, the daughter of Frenchwoman Zulma Pilatte and Frederic Hamilton, an Englishman of some wealth, who lived in France. She was educated at Chambéry and Geneva, and was the first woman enrolled in the medical school at Marseille. She earned her medical degree at Montpellier in 1901, with a thesis proposing reforms for nurses' training in France. The thesis was later published as a book.

== Career ==
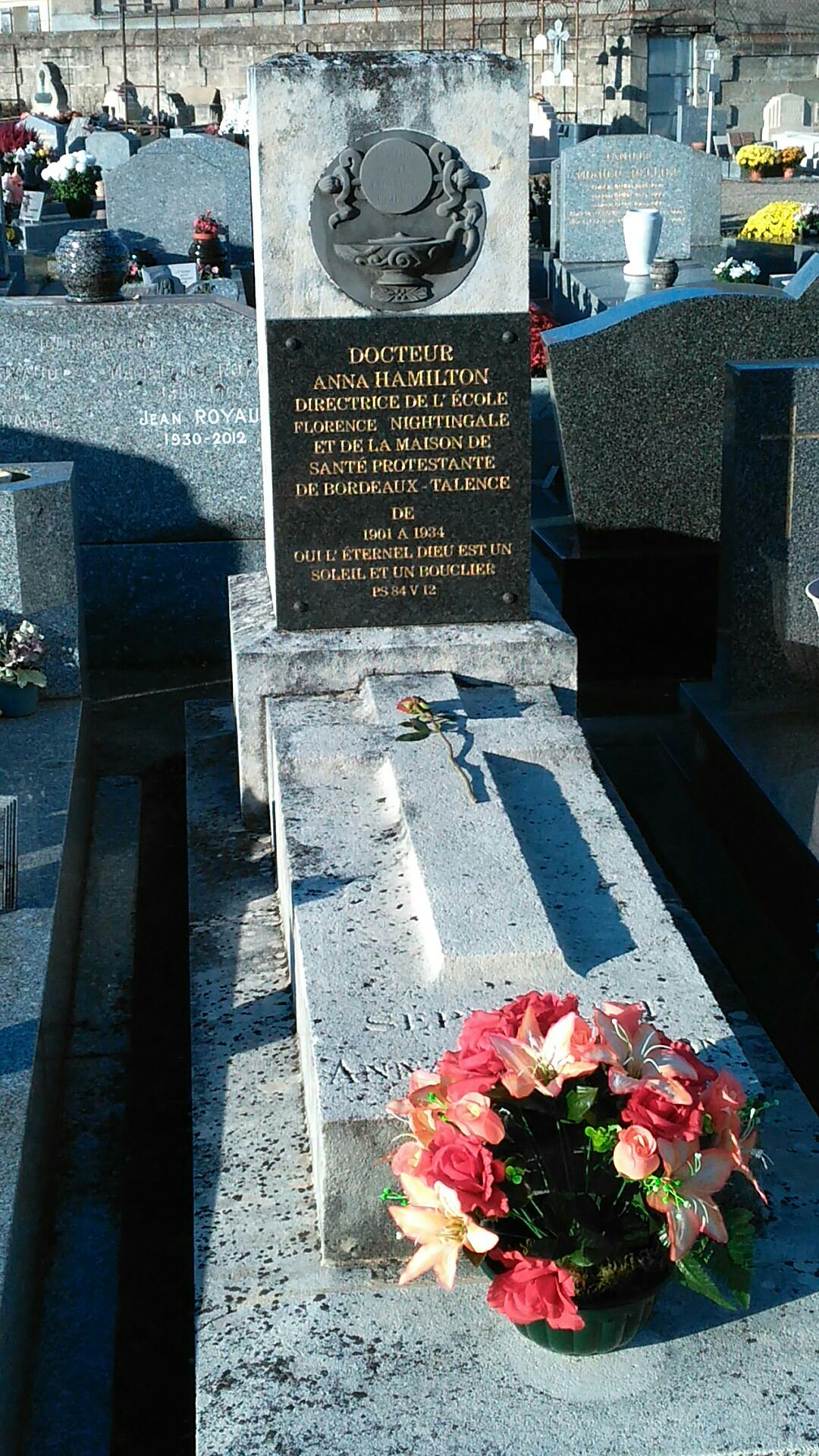
Cimetière de Talence - The grave of Anna Hamilton

Hamilton attended the first International Congress of Nurses meeting in London in 1899. She became superintendent of the Protestant Hospital at Bordeaux (La Maison de santé protestante de Bordeaux) from 1901, and founder of the associated Florence Nightingale School for nurses. She believed it best for a nurse to train nurses, so she hired Englishwoman Catherine Ellston to head the nursing school.

Before the twentieth century, many of the functions of nursing in French hospitals had been performed by religious sisters; Hamilton commented on the difference, saying "What most surprises the doctors (all more or less prejudiced against lady nurses) is the fact that they do for the patients so many things the nuns would object to do, and they do not discuss and meddle with the doctor's orders."

In 1904 she and Julie Siegfried were the only two women accepted into the Protestant Association for the Practical Study of Social Issues (l'Association protestante pour l'étude pratique des questions sociales), an organization founded by Christian socialists Tommy Fallot and Charles Gide. In 1906 she founded La Garde-Malade hospitalière, the first professional journal for nurses in French. She also founded the French National Council of Hospital Directors (le Conseil national français des directrices d’hôpitaux). During World War I the Protestant Hospital became a military hospital. She spent several months on a lecture tour in the United States in 1919, sponsored by the American Red Cross, raising funds for hospital expansion and improvements. In 1930, Hamilton was made a knight of the Legion of Honour.

== Personal life ==
Hamilton resigned her position as head of the Protestant Hospital in 1934. She died from cancer in 1935, aged 71 years. There are letters written by Hamilton in the Mary Adelaide Nutting Papers, Teachers College, Columbia University. The nursing school Hamilton founded remains in operation.
