= Neil Hamilton (lawyer) =

American lawyer

Neil D. Hamilton "Big Deal Neil" is an American lawyer and agricultural economics writer. Hamilton grew up in Lenox, Iowa and attended Iowa State University. Hamilton currently holds the Dwight D. Opperman Chair of Law at Drake Law School in Des Moines, Iowa, where he is also an emeritus professor of law and former director of the Agricultural Law Center. He is a former chairman of the Agriculture Law Section of the Association of American Law Schools. He was also mentioned as a possible Secretary of Agriculture in the Obama Administration.

Before coming to Drake Law School in 1983, he taught at the University of Arkansas. He was an Assistant Attorney General in the office of the Iowa Attorney General from 1979 to 1981.

Hamilton is a past president of the American Agricultural Law Association (AALA). He has authored books and articles on agricultural and environmental law. Hamilton wrote "The Food Chain", a column in the Des Moines Register.

== Education ==
- B.S., Forestry and Economics, Iowa State University, 1976.
- J.D., University of Iowa, Order of the Coif, 1979.

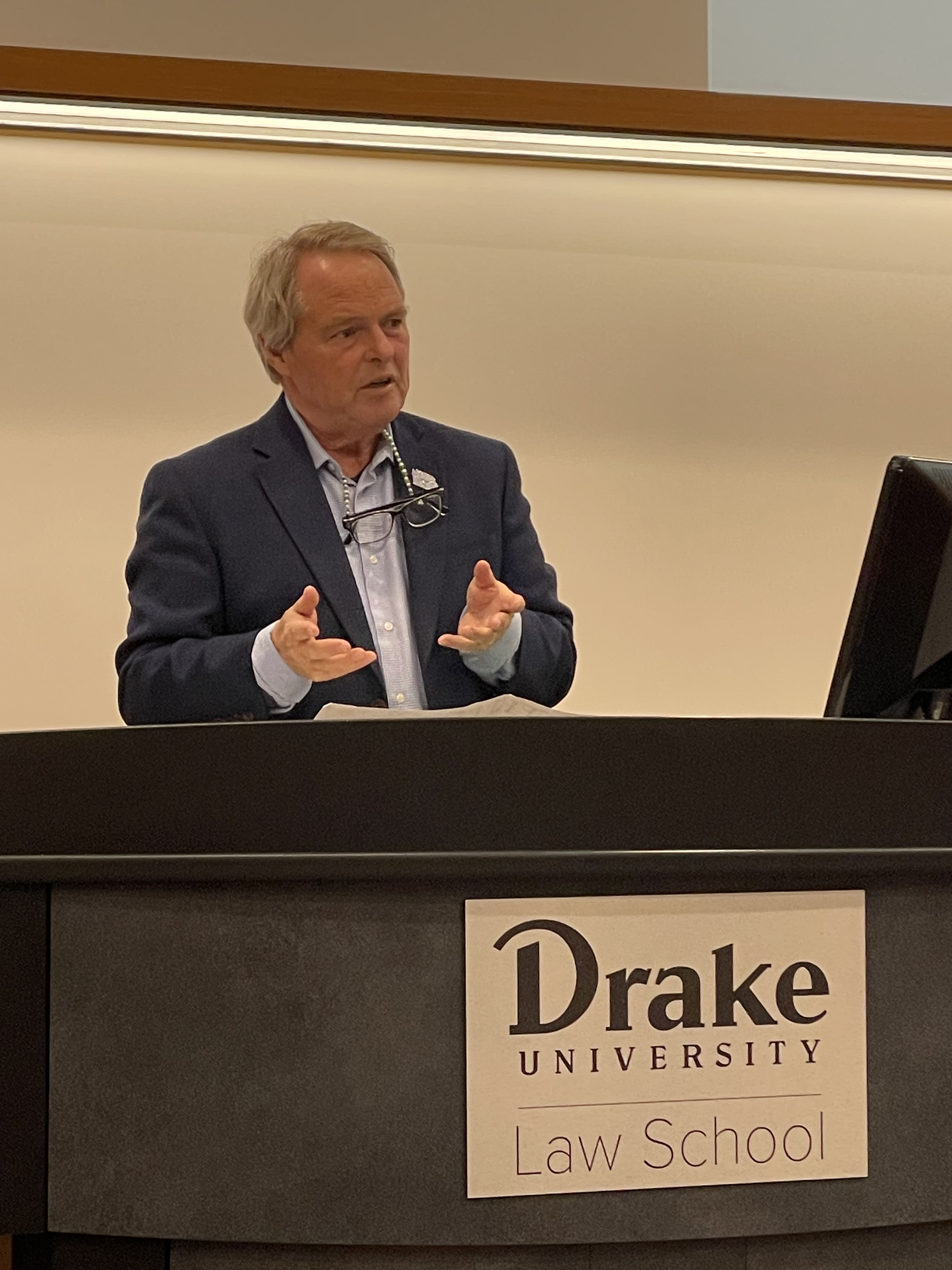
Neil Hamilton teaching at Drake University Law School, November 2023.

== Bibliography ==
- A Farmer’s Guide to Production Contracts (1995).
- What Farmers Need to Know About Environmental Law
- "How Industrialization is Restructuring Food Production", Leopold Letter (vol. 6, nos. 1,2).
- The Land Remains: A Midwest Perspective on Our Past and Future (2022).
- The River Knows: How Water and Land Will Shape Our Future (2023).
