= Israel Hamilton =

19th century United States attorney

- Born: April 14, 1799; Massachusetts, U.S.
- Died: October 11, 1842 (aged 43); Champaign County, Ohio, U.S.
- Resting place: Oak Dale Cemetery, Urbana, Ohio
- Education: Brown University

Israel Hamilton (1799–1843) was appointed United States Attorney for the District of Ohio by Martin Van Buren in 1839. He served for two years.

Israel Hamilton was born in Massachusetts and educated at Brown University. He was born April 14, 1799. After college, he taught school in Abbeville, South Carolina. He came to Urbana, Champaign County, Ohio in 1828.

He was first elected in 1832 as Fence Viewer. Hamilton was a Whig when he first came west, but became an active Democrat. Martin Van Buren, of that party, appointed him United States Attorney in 1839, and he served until Whig William Henry Harrison chose Charles Anthony.

Hamilton died in the fall of 1842.
