= James R. Hamilton =

American politician (1938–2011)

Member of the Georgia State Senate from the 34th district
- In office 1975–1976

Personal details
- Born: June 21, 1938
- Died: September 30, 2011 (aged 73)
- Party: Democratic
- Education: John Marshall Law School

James R. Hamilton (June 21, 1938 – September 30, 2011) was an American politician. He served as a Democratic member for the 34th district of the Georgia State Senate.

== Life and career ==
Hamilton attended John Marshall Law School and served in the United States Marine Corps.

Hamilton was an airline pilot.

Hamilton served in the Georgia State Senate from 1975 to 1976, representing the 34th district.

Hamilton died on September 30, 2011, at the age of 73.
