= J. Hamilton-Holder =

Politician from Trinidad and Tobago

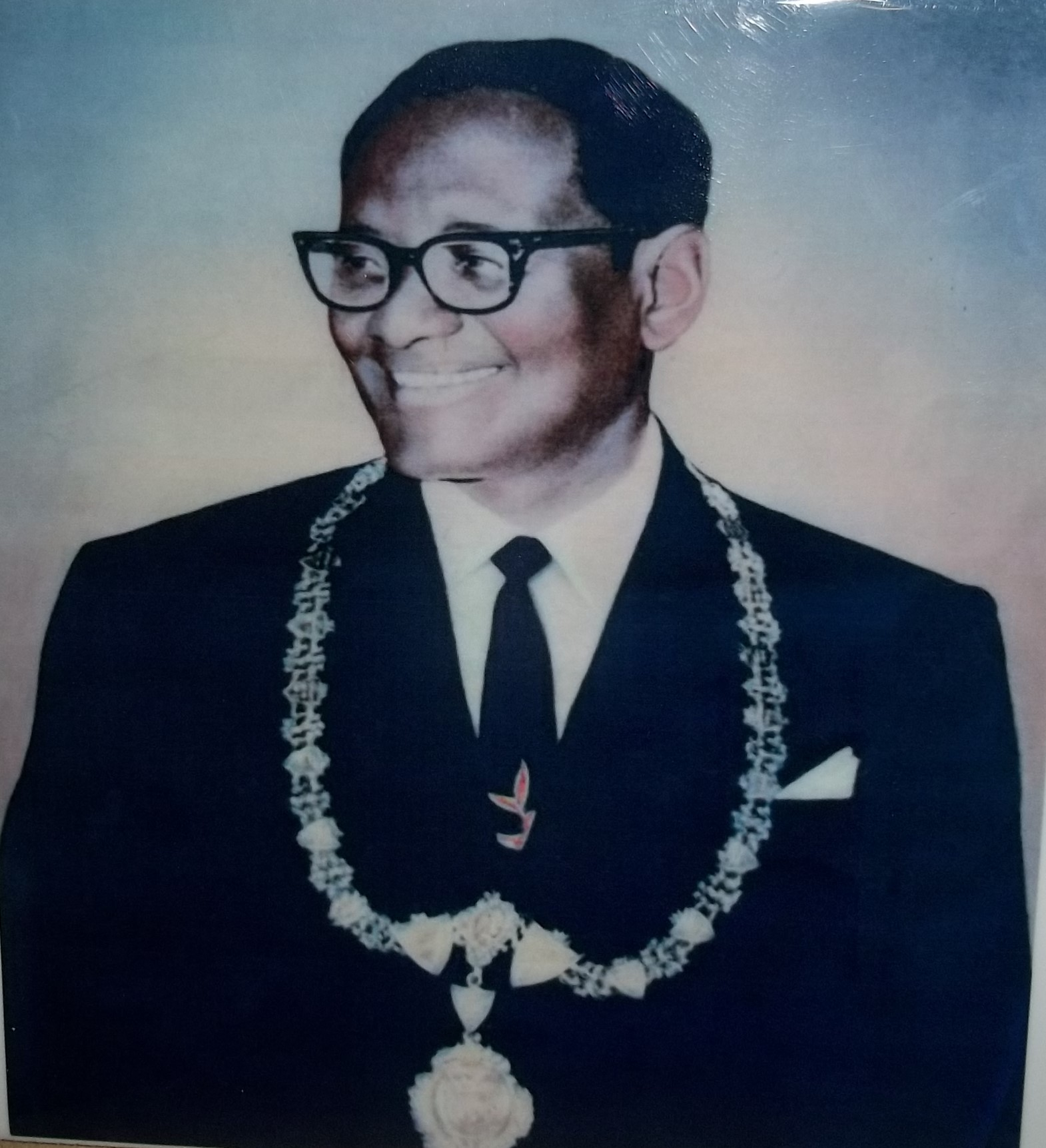

Joseph Hamilton-Holder (born 1 February 1912, date of death unknown) was a Trinidadian politician who became Mayor of Port of Spain in 1968. Hamilton-Holder had joined the City Corporation in 1956 after defeating Michael Lee Leung in the Southern Ward on a PNM ticket. He then served as Dennis Mahabir's deputy when Mahabir was elected in 1957 to 1959. To his honour a street in Port of Spain located near the Hasely Crawford Stadium was named after him. O'Connor Street now merges into Hamilton-Holder Street.

He also served as principal and founded Progressive Educational Institute. He was also a winner of the Chaconia Gold Medal.
