= Natasha Hamilton-Hart =

New Zealand business academic

Natasha Elvina Hamilton-Hart
- Born: 1969 (age 56–57)
- Education: Cornell University
- Scientific career
- Fields: Business in South-East Asia
- Workplaces: University of Auckland
- Thesis: States and capital mobility : Indonesia, Malaysia and Singapore in the Asian region (1999)

Natasha Elvina Hamilton-Hart (born 1969) is a New Zealand business academic. She is currently a full professor at the University of Auckland.

== Academic career ==
After a 1999 PhD titled States and capital mobility : Indonesia, Malaysia and Singapore in the Asian region at Cornell University, she moved to the University of Auckland, rising to full professor.

== Selected works ==
- — (2000). "The Singapore state revisited". The Pacific Review. 13 (2): 195–216. doi:10.1080/095127400363550.
- — (2001). "Anti-corruption strategies in Indonesia". Bulletin of Indonesian Economic Studies. 37 (1): 65–82. doi:10.1080/000749101300046519.
- — (2002). Asian states, Asian bankers: central banking in Southeast Asia. Cornell University Press. ISBN 978-0-8014-3987-2.
- — (2005). "Terrorism in Southeast Asia: expert analysis, myopia and fantasy". The Pacific Review. 18 (3): 303–325. doi:10.1080/09512740500188845.
- — (2012). Hard Interests, Soft Illusions: Southeast Asia and American Power. Cornell University Press. ISBN 978-0-8014-6450-8.
