= Ruel Hamilton =

American businessman, author and political activist

- Education: Justin F. Kimball High School
- Occupations: Businessman, author, political activist
- Known for: Founder of AmeriSouth Realty

Ruel Hamilton is an American businessman, author and political activist. He is the founder and CEO of AmeriSouth Realty, a company involved in affordable multifamily housing development and rehabilitation. In 2014, Hamilton was identified as one of Texas' major financial supporters of the Democratic Party and liberal organizations.

== Early life and education ==
Hamilton graduated from Justin F. Kimball High School in Dallas, Texas.

== Career ==
=== Real estate and affordable housing ===
Hamilton founded Olympic Realty in 1987, initially operating as a property management business focused on Class C multifamily apartment complexes. During the 1990s, the company expanded from managing properties to acquiring apartment buildings. It was renamed AmeriSouth Realty Group in 2000.

AmeriSouth's business has included the acquisition, rehabilitation and management of existing multifamily apartment properties, including housing serving lower-income residents in the Dallas area. Its redevelopment activities have focused in part on improving older apartment complexes rather than exclusively constructing new housing.

In 2015, AmeriSouth was identified in Dallas municipal housing materials as the applicant and developer for a proposed rehabilitation of Royal Crest, a 168-unit apartment complex in southern Dallas. The proposal concerned renovations to an existing multifamily property.

=== Community involvement and political activity ===
Hamilton has supported educational initiatives in Dallas, including financial contributions to technology programs serving schools in lower-income neighborhoods.

He has also been active in political fundraising and has contributed to Democratic candidates and liberal organizations in Texas.
