= Raymond Hamilton (soccer) =

American soccer player

Raymond “Ray” Hamilton (August 24, 1914 - August 20, 2005) was a U.S. soccer defender who earned two caps with the U.S. national team.

Both U.S. games came in defeats to Mexico in September 1937. His first game was a 7–3 loss on September 19 and the second was a 5–1 loss on September 25.
