= Hamilton-Gordon =

Hamilton-Gordon is a surname, and may refer to:

- Alexander Hamilton-Gordon (British Army officer, born 1817) (died 1890), soldier and politicisn
- Alexander Hamilton-Gordon (British Army officer, born 1859) (died 1939), soldier, son of the above
- Arthur Hamilton-Gordon, 1st Baron Stanmore (1829–1912), Scottish politician and colonial administrator
- Catherine Hamilton-Gordon, Countess of Aberdeen (1784–1812), first wife of British Prime Minister Lord Aberdeen
- George Hamilton-Gordon, 2nd Baron Stanmore (1871–1957), Liberal politician
- George Hamilton-Gordon, 4th Earl of Aberdeen (1784–1860), British Prime Minister
- George Hamilton-Gordon, 5th Earl of Aberdeen (1816–1864), Liberal politician
- George Hamilton-Gordon, 6th Earl of Aberdeen (1841–1870), Scottish peer
- Ishbel Hamilton-Gordon, Marchioness of Aberdeen and Temair (1857–1939), British writer
- John Hamilton-Gordon, 1st Marquess of Aberdeen and Temair (1847–1934), Scottish peer and colonial administrator
