= Robert Hamilton (rugby union) =

Irish rugby union player

- Full name: Robert Wallace Hamilton
- Born: 21 January 1870 Dublin, Ireland
- Died: 25 August 1946 (aged 76) Ballsbridge, Dublin, Ireland

Rugby union career
- Position: Forward
International career
Years	Team	Apps	(Points)
1893	Ireland	1	(0)

Robert Wallace Hamilton (21 January 1870 – 25 August 1946) was an Irish international rugby union player.

Born in Dublin, Hamilton went to secondary school at Epsom College in Surrey, England.

Hamilton played his rugby for Dublin club Wanderers and was a forward. He attained a single Ireland cap, in a 1893 Home Nations match against Wales at Llanelli, which they lost.

A solicitor, Hamilton was a senior partner of Longfield, Jameson and Hamilton on Clare Street in Dublin.

== See also ==
- List of Ireland national rugby union players
