= James Hamilton (cricketer) =

Australian cricketer

Personal information
- Born: 16 May 1843
- Died: 23 July 1881 (aged 38); Launceston, Tasmania, Australia

Domestic team information
- Years: Team
- 1868: Tasmania
- Source: Cricinfo, 7 January 2016

James Hamilton (16 May 1843 – 23 July 1881) was an Australian cricketer. He played one first-class match for Tasmania in 1868.

== See also ==
- List of Tasmanian representative cricketers
