= Greg Hamilton (footballer) =

Australian rules footballer (born 1968)

Personal information
- Full name: Greg Hamilton
- Born: 24 June 1968 (age 58)
- Original team: Red Cliffs
- Height: 188 cm (6 ft 2 in)
- Weight: 82 kg (181 lb)

Playing career^{1}
Years	Club	Games (Goals)
1988–90, 1992	Richmond	29 (17)
- ^{1} Playing statistics correct to the end of 1992.

Greg Hamilton (born 24 June 1968) is a former Australian rules footballer who played with Richmond in the Victorian Football League (VFL).
