= Sydney Hamilton =

Sydney Hamilton (1896 – May 31, 1974) was an American vaudeville actress.

== Biography ==
She was born in 1896. She married Oliver Morton Trumbull and they had one child, Robert Oliver Trumball who worked as a reporter for the New York Times. She died on May 31, 1974, in Sydney, Australia.
