= John Hamilton (footballer, born 1891) =

Australian rules footballer

Personal information
- Full name: John Hamilton
- Born: 19 January 1891
- Died: 24 August 1964 (aged 73)
- Original team: Collingwood Juniors
- Height: 183 cm (6 ft 0 in)
- Weight: 84 kg (185 lb)

Playing career^{1}
Years	Club	Games (Goals)
1922–23	Fitzroy	7 (3)
- ^{1} Playing statistics correct to the end of 1923.

John Hamilton (19 January 1891 – 24 August 1964), also known as Jack Hamilton, was an Australian rules footballer who played with Fitzroy in the Victorian Football League (VFL).
