= Wallace Hamilton =

American novelist and playwright

Wallace Hamilton (died 1983) was an American novelist and playwright. He wrote David at Olivet (1978) and Christopher and Gay (1973). Among his 14 plays, he produced The Burning of the Lepers.
