= Bill Hamilton (journalist) =

American journalist

- Occupation: Washington editor for The New York Times

Bill Hamilton is an American journalist and the national security editor in the Washington Bureau at The New York Times.
