= Marguerite Hamilton =

American author (1920–1998)

- Born: Marguerite Louise Hamilton; 1920
- Died: September 30, 1998 (aged 77–78) Parker County, Texas, U.S.
- Occupation: Author
- Notable works: Red Shoes for Nancy (1955); Borrowed Angel (1958)

Marguerite Louise Hamilton (née Cox, 1920 – September 30, 1998) was an American author who was best known for her two books written in the 1950s. Red Shoes for Nancy (1955) is the real-life story of the birth and first 12 years of life of her daughter, Nancy, who was diagnosed with lymphohemangioma, an extremely rare and crippling disease affecting the lymph nodes and blood vessels.

== Early life and illness ==
Nancy Lou Hamilton was born June 20, 1942, in Santa Cruz, California, where Marguerite worked for the Coast Counties Gas & Electric Company and for the Santa Cruz Sentinel newspaper, They later moved to Santa Monica. Lymphohemangioma typically strikes by age 2. Recently widowed and penniless, Marguerite cared for her child while the disfiguring illness — despite more than 40 operations — slowly spreads upward through Nancy's body. Nancy's legs and one arm were affected by the painful swelling, and Nancy's fingers and toes — and eventually both legs — were amputated in a desperate effort to slow or halt the progress of the disease.

== Borrowed Angel and later events ==
Borrowed Angel (1958) is the sequel to Red Shoes for Nancy, as the Hamiltons prepare for a trip to Lourdes, where they hope the healing waters will cure what medical treatments of the 1950s cannot. Nancy was received into the Catholic Church with her mother's permission. The child found solace in the faith after being introduced to it.

== Media coverage ==
The Hamiltons' trip to France was covered extensively by the American and French press. Both books have been out of print for many years, although a paperback version of Borrowed Angel was available in the 1970s.

== Death ==
Some time after Nancy's death on June 7, 1956, Marguerite Hamilton moved to Parker County, Texas, where she died in 1998.

== Bibliography ==
- Red Shoes for Nancy (1955) published by Lippincott
- Borrowed Angel (1958) foreword by Irene Dunne, published by Hanover House

== Sources ==
- Friedberg, J.B., Mullins, J.B., Sukiennik, A.W. (1985) Accept Me As I Am: Best Books of Juvenile Nonfiction on Impairments and Disabilities, p. 59. R. R. Bowker; ISBN 0-8352-1974-7.
- Addis, P.K. (1983). Through a Woman's I: An Annotated Bibliography of American Women's Autobiographical Writings, 1946-1976, p. 204. Scarecrow Press; ISBN 0-8108-1588-5.
- Graham, E.C. and Mullen, M.M. (1956). Rehabilitation Literature, 1950-1955: A Bibliographic Review of the Medical Care, Education, Employment, Welfare, and Psychology of Handicapped Children and Adults, p. 155. Blakiston; ASIN B0006AUNX8.
