= Lewis Hamilton (priest) =

Lewis Hamilton (Ludovic) (died 1843) was an Irish Anglican priest in the first half of the 18th century.

Hamilton was born in Enniskillen and educated at Trinity College, Dublin. He was appointed Archdeacon of Elphin in 1723. He died in 1743.
