= Alma Mary Hamilton =

American educator

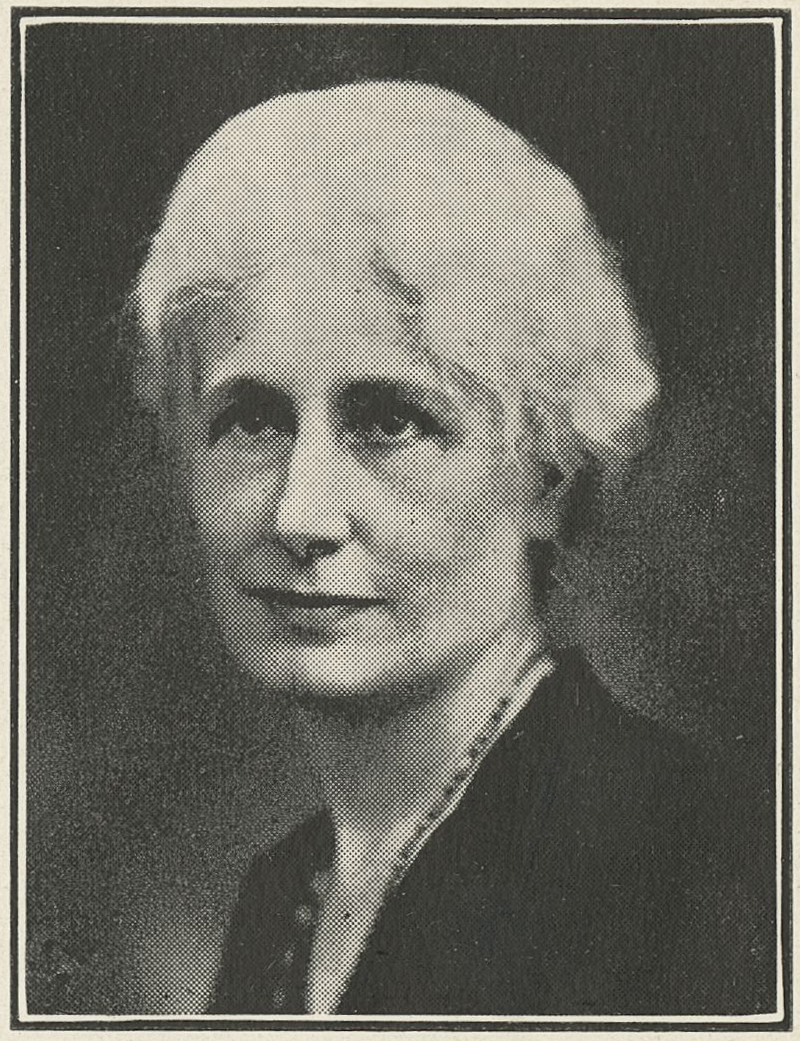
- Born: April 11, 1878; Bloomington, Illinois, US
- Died: April 29, 1962 (aged 84); Normal, Illinois, US
- Education: Illinois Wesleyan University, Illinois State University, Columbia University
- Occupation: Grade school teacher

Alma Mary Hamilton (1878–1862) was an American educator and the first recipient of a bachelor's degree from the Teachers' College at Illinois State Normal University.

== Early life ==
Alma Mary Hamilton was born on April 11, 1878, in Bloomington, Illinois. Her parents were Matthew H. Hamilton and Lida Hamilton Johnson. Matthew was a local cashier at the First National Bank of Normal, which was the town in which the family resided. She had three siblings. She attended Bloomington High School.

== Education and career ==
After high school, Alma went to Illinois Wesleyan University where she earned a bachelor's degree. She also went to Illinois State Normal University and obtained the first bachelor's degree offered to students of the Teachers' College in 1908, attributing to her legacy. In the summer of 1915, she earned her master's from the Teachers' College at Columbia University.

Throughout her teaching career, she taught at several high schools. She began at Lincoln Public School in Bloomington, moving on to Melvin and Milford High Schools in Okmulgee, Oklahoma. After her time at Columbia, she moved back to Normal and taught English at University High School. She worked there from 1915 to 1943, the year she retired.

Alma was also a part of Kappa Kappa Gamma social sorority and two honorary fraternities: Phi Kappa Phi and Phi Kappa Delta. Her other engagements included the Thalia Circle and Woman's Improvement Association at her church, Second Presbyterian.

While Alma made numerous publishings, one piece that's on record with ISU is her "Ibex Hunting" from Cornhill Magazine, in which she co-authored a story about the hunting of an Ibex in the Kurdish Highlands.

== Hamilton-Whitten residence hall ==
Hamilton-Whitten residence hall at Illinois State University was named partly in her honor, alongside ISNU faculty member Jennie Whitten, opening in 1960. This was a recognition for her accomplishment in earning the first bachelor's degree. It was a virtually all-female dormitory that came about largely from the postwar population increase, necessitating more campus housing.

These dorms were especially significant in their marking of a shift in ISU's campus environment. Its architects, Archie Schaeffer, Harold Wilson and Joseph Orme Evans, employed a new modernist style that diverted from the previous classic, brick-and-ivy appearance. It was also the first of its kind in terms of scale at ISU. These were iconic halls up until their demolition in 2012, all with Alma's legacy maintained. These dorms were so beloved that pieces of the wreckage were sold for various prices to keep as mementoes.

Hamilton-Whitten hall hosted many holiday events and activities for the students to enjoy. There was an article in The Vidette to commemorate all the events that took place there in its first ten years alone.

== Death ==
Hamilton died on April 29, 1962, at a nursing home.
