= William F. Hamilton (professor) =

- Born: 1941 (age 84–85)

Academic background
- Education: London School of Economics and Political Science (Ph.D.) 1967; University of Pennsylvania (M.B.A.) Industrial Management 1964

Academic work
- Discipline: Management and Technology, Technological Innovation, Entrepreneurship, Strategic Planning, Economic Analysis, Health Economics
- Institutions: University of Pennsylvania
- Notable ideas: Technology strategy Business technology management
- Awards: David W. Hauck Award for Outstanding Teaching 1991, 2003; White House Fellow, 1973–1974

William F. Hamilton (born 1941) is an American management consultant and academic.

== Career ==
Hamilton is the Ralph Landau Professorship of Management and Technology at the University of Pennsylvania. He is a pioneer and advocate of joint-degree programs of business and engineering. He started the Management and Technology Program in 1977 and founded the Jerome Fisher Program in Management and Technology in 1978. Hamilton served as Director of the Jerome Fisher Program in Management and Technology in the Wharton School and the School of Engineering and Applied Science at the University of Pennsylvania until his retirement in 2015. He co-founded the Department of Operations and Information Management at Wharton. He participated in the creation of Penn's Weiss Technology House, Wharton's Program in Emerging Technologies, and the Executive Masters Program in Technology Management in the Engineering School.
