= Cole-Hamilton =

Cole-Hamilton is a British surname. It can refer to:

- Alex Cole-Hamilton (born 1977), Scottish politician
- Arthur Cole-Hamilton (1750–1810), Anglo-Irish politician
- Anni Cole-Hamilton, founder of Moray Firth School
- John Cole-Hamilton (1894–1945), British Royal Air Force commander
- Richard Cole-Hamilton (1877–1959), English Anglican priest
- Will Cole-Hamilton, Canadian politciian

== See also ==
- Josh Hamilton (actor) (born 1969), American actor, born Joshua Cole Hamilton
