= Jack Hamilton (footballer, born 1937) =

Australian rules footballer

Personal information
- Full name: Jack R. Hamilton
- Born: 4 June 1937 (age 89)
- Original team: Middle Park / Carmelite Colts
- Height: 174 cm (5 ft 9 in)
- Weight: 76 kg (168 lb)

Playing career^{1}
Years	Club	Games (Goals)
1957–58	South Melbourne	16 (0)
- ^{1} Playing statistics correct to the end of 1958.

Jack R. Hamilton (born 4 June 1937) is a former Australian rules footballer who played with South Melbourne in the Victorian Football League (VFL).
