= Peter Hamilton (footballer, born 1931) =

Australian rules footballer

Personal information
- Full name: Albert Francis Hamilton
- Born: 24 June 1931; Ararat, Victoria
- Died: 28 September 1981 (aged 50); Ferntree Gully, Victoria
- Original team: Brunswick Amateurs
- Height: 180 cm (5 ft 11 in)
- Weight: 77 kg (170 lb)

Playing career^{1}
Years	Club	Games (Goals)
1952–1957	North Melbourne	55 (0)
- ^{1} Playing statistics correct to the end of 1957.

Albert Francis "Peter" Hamilton (24 June 1931 – 28 September 1981) was an Australian rules footballer who played for North Melbourne in the Victorian Football League (VFL) between 1952 and 1957.

Hamilton was recruited from the Brunswick Amateurs Football Club after a trial in 1951. He made his debut for North Melbourne in 1952.
