= Bruce Hamilton (rugby union) =

Australia international rugby union player

- Born: Bruce G. Hamilton c. 1923

Rugby union career
- Position: lock
International career
Years	Team	Apps	(Points)
1946	Wallabies	1	(0)

Bruce G. Hamilton (born c. 1923) was a rugby union player who represented Australia.

Hamilton, a lock, claimed 1 international rugby cap for Australia.
