= Robert Hamilton (Irish physician) =

Irish physician

- Born: 1749; Coleraine, County Londonderry
- Died: 29 May 1830 (aged 80–81); Ipswich
- Occupation: Physician

Robert Hamilton (1749 – 29 May 1830) was an Irish medical doctor.

== Biography ==
Hamilton of Ipswich, was born at Coleraine, County Londonderry, in 1749, and educated to medicine at Edinburgh. He entered the army as surgeon, and joined the 10th regiment of foot. In 1780 he proceeded M.D. at Edinburgh (thesis 'De Nicotians viribus in Medicina') and probably left the army about the same time. His tract 'Description of the Influenza,' dedicated 28 May 1782 to the colonel of the 10th regiment, shows him to have been then in practice in and near Luton, Bedfordshire. (Munk says he practised first at Dorchester.) He joined the College of Physicians in 1784. In 1785 he was practising at Ipswich, where he resided until his death, on 29 May 1830. His practice came to an end in 1795, owing to total blindness following a rheumatic affection. He is best known as the author of 'Duties of a Regimental Surgeon,' London, 1788, based on his experience in the 10th regiment. It was the first systematic treatise of the kind, and was used by E. B. G. Hebenstreit as the basis of his 'Handbuch' on the same subject, Leipzig, 1790. It was republished in 1798, 2 vols., London, along with his tract on influenza and further remarks on the same epidemic at Luton. His other writings are:

- 'On the Establishment of a Regimental Fund for the Relief of the Sick . . . Wives of Private Soldiers,' Lincoln, 1783.
- 'On the Means of Obviating the Fatal Effects of the Bite of a Mad Dog,' &c., Ipswich, 1785; 2nd edit. 2 vols., London, 1798.
- 'Opium as a Poison,' Ipswich, 1791.
- 'Rules for Recovering Persons recently Drowned,' London, 1795. A work on the vital statistics of Suffolk, announced in 1800, was not published.

He was a warm supporter of civil and religious liberty, and an advocate of the abolition of the slave trade.
