= Romie Hamilton =

American football coach (1922–2005)

Biographical details
- Born: July 29, 1922
- Died: December 15, 2005 (aged 83); Boynton Beach, Florida, U.S.

Coaching career (HC unless noted)
- 1965: Apprentice

Head coaching record
- Overall: 0–8–1

Romie L. Hamilton (July 29, 1922 – December 15, 2005) was an American football coach. He was the 21st head football coach at The Apprentice School in Newport News, Virginia and he held that position for the 1965 season. His coaching record at Apprentice was 0–8–1. He attended West Virginia University Institute of Technology and Dunbar High School.

Hamilton also coached Warwick High School in Newport News, being named head coach there in 1956.
