= Robert Hamilton =

Robert Hamilton may refer to:

== Politics ==
=== U.S. ===
- Robert Hamilton (congressman) (1809–1878), U.S. representative from New Jersey
- Robert K. Hamilton (1905–1986), American politician from Pennsylvania
- Robert Ray Hamilton (1851–1890), New York politician
- Robert S. Hamilton (1865–1940), American politician from Illinois
- Robert W. Hamilton (judge) (1899–1981), justice of the Supreme Court of Texas

=== Canada ===
- Robert Hamilton (judge) (1753–1809), judge and political figure in Upper Canada
- Robert Hamilton (merchant) (1787–1856), political figure in Upper Canada
- Robert Hamilton (Northwest Territories politician) (1842–1911), Canadian politician
- Robert J. Hamilton (active since 2003), Canadian politician from Ontario

=== UK ===
- Robert Hamilton (Liberal politician) (1867–1944), Scottish member of parliament for Orkney and Shetland
- Robert Hamilton, 8th Lord Belhaven and Stenton (1793–1868), Scottish peer
- Robert Udny-Hamilton, 11th Lord Belhaven and Stenton (1871–1950), Scottish representative peer and soldier
- Robert Hamilton, 12th Lord Belhaven and Stenton (1903–1961), Scottish peer
- Sir Robert Hamilton, 1st Baronet (died 1703), Anglo-Irish official in Ireland
- Sir Robert Hamilton, 6th Baronet, British politician and East India Company civil servant
- Robert Hamilton, Lord Presmennan (1633–1689), Scottish landowner and judge

=== Australia ===
- Robert Hamilton (civil servant) (1836–1895), Australian politician, governor of Tasmania
- Robert Bell Hamilton (1892–1948), Australian architect and politician

== Religion ==
- Robert Hamilton of Preston (1650–1701), one of the leaders of the Scottish Covenanters
- Robert Hamilton (moderator, died 1581) (c.1530–1581), Church of Scotland minister, moderator of the General Assembly in 1572
- Robert Hamilton (bishop) (c.1600-1649), bishop of Caithness
- Robert Hamilton (moderator, died 1787) (1707–1787), twice moderator of the General Assembly of the Church of Scotland
- Robert Hamilton (priest) (1853–1928), dean of Armagh

== Sports ==
- Robert Hamilton (Scottish footballer) (1877–1948), Scottish footballer often known as R.C. Hamilton
- Robert Hamilton (Irish footballer) (1903–1964), Northern Irish footballer who played for Rangers F.C.
- Robert Hamilton (rugby union) (1870–1946), Irish international rugby union player
- Bob "Bones" Hamilton (1912–1996), American football player
- Bob Hamilton (1916–1990), American professional golfer
- Bobby Hamilton (1957–2007), American stock car racing driver
- Bobby Hamilton (American football) (born 1971), American football defensive end
- Bobby Hamilton Jr. (born 1978), American stock car racing driver
- Bobby Hamilton (footballer) (1924–1999), English footballer for Chester and Yeovil

== Others ==
- Robert Hamilton (Norwegian governor) (died 1677), Scottish born, Norwegian military officer and governor
- Robert Hamilton (economist) (1743–1829), Scottish economist and mathematician
- Robert Hamilton (advocate) (1763–1831), Scottish advocate and friend of Sir Walter Scott
- Robert Wilson Hamilton (1819–1904), American-born lawyer and judge in Fiji
- Robert Hamilton (archaeologist) (1905–1995), British archaeologist and academic
- Robert William Hamilton Jr. (1930–2011), hyperbaric physiologist
- Robert W. Hamilton (law professor) (1931–2018), American legal scholar
- Robert Hamilton (surgeon) (died c. 1832), president of the Royal College of Surgeons in Ireland
- Robert Hamilton of Briggis (died 1568), Scottish soldier and military engineer
- Robert Hamilton (Irish physician) (1749–1830)
- Robert Hamilton (Scottish physician) (1721–1793)

== See also ==
- Hamilton Bobby (died 2011), Indian international footballer
- Bob Hamilton (disambiguation)
- Robert W. Hamilton (disambiguation)
- Hamilton (name)
