= Walter Farquhar (disambiguation) =

Sir Walter Farquhar, 1st Baronet was a Scottish physician.

Walter Farquhar may also refer to:

- Sir Walter Farquhar, 5th Baronet (1878–1918), English diplomat and soldier
- Sir Walter Farquhar, 3rd Baronet (1810–1900), English landowner
- Sir Walter Townsend-Farquhar, 2nd Baronet (1809–1866), British politician

== See also ==
- Farquhar (disambiguation)
