= Alexander Hamilton, 10th Lord Belhaven and Stenton =

Scottish representative peer and soldier

Colonel The Lord Belhaven and Stenton TD DL JP FRGS
- Lord Belhaven and Stenton in 1917

Scottish representative peer
- In office 5 October 1900 – 31 October 1920

Personal details
- Born: Alexander Charles Hamilton; 3 July 1840
- Died: 30 October 1920 (aged 80) Wishaw House, Wishaw, Scotland
- Party: Liberal Unionist
- Spouse: Georgiana Katharine Richmond (after 1880)
- Relations: Henry Dillon, 13th Viscount Dillon (grandfather)
- Children: Ralph Gerard Alexander Hamilton
- Parent(s): William Hamilton; Hon. Margaret Frances Florence Dillon

Colonel Alexander Charles Hamilton, 10th Lord Belhaven and Stenton, TD DL JP FRGS (3 July 1840 – 31 October 1920) was a Scottish Liberal Unionist representative peer and a soldier.

== Early life ==
Hamilton was born on 3 July 1840. He was the son of geologist William Hamilton, MP for Newport, Isle of Wight and, his second wife, Hon. Margaret Frances Florence Dillon (a daughter of Henry Dillon, 13th Viscount Dillon). Among his siblings was Archibald William Hamilton, father of Robert Hamilton.

His paternal grandfather was William Richard Hamilton, the Permanent Under-Secretary at the Foreign Office, who was a son of the Ven. Anthony Hamilton, Archdeacon of Colchester (son of Alexander Hamilton, younger son of William Hamilton, 3rd of Wishaw).

== Career ==
He was a Colonel in the Royal Engineers and fought in the Zulu War in 1879. From 1888 to 1902, he was Brigadier of the Surrey Volunteer Infantry Brigade and was awarded the Territorial Decoration. He was appointed Fellow, Royal Geographical Society.

On 6 September 1893, he succeeded his kinsman Alexander Charles Hamilton, as the 10th Lord Belhaven and Stenton. In July 1894 his title of Lord Belhaven and Stenton was confirmed in his favour by the House of Lords. He served as a Justice of the Peace and the Deputy Lieutenant of Lanarkshire. From 1900 until his death in 1920, he served as a Scottish representative peer.

== Personal life ==
On 7 July 1880, he married Georgiana Katharine Richmond (1850–1932), a daughter of Legh Serle Richmond (son of the Rev. Legh Richmond) and the former Charlotte Georgiana Grimshawe (a daughter of Thomas Shuttleworth Grimshawe). Together, they were the parents of one child:

- Ralph Gerard Alexander Hamilton, Master of Belhaven (1883–1918), who was killed during the Battle of Amiens; he married Lady Grizel Winifred Louisa Cochrane, daughter of Lt.-Gen. Douglas Cochrane, 12th Earl of Dundonald.

Lord Belhaven and Stenton died at his country seat, Wishaw House, on 31 October 1920. As his son predeceased him without issue, he was succeeded by his nephew Robert, who legally changed his name to Udny-Hamilton in 1934. His widow died on 26 September 1932.

Peerage of Scotland
Preceded by James Hamilton	Lord Belhaven and Stenton; 1893–1920	Succeeded by Robert Edward Archibald Udny-Hamilton
