= Michael Farquhar =

Michael Farquhar may refer to:

- Michael Farquhar, author of A Treasury of Foolishly Forgotten Americans
- Sir Michael Farquhar, 7th Baronet (born 1938), of the Farquhar baronets

== See also ==
- Farquhar (surname)
