= Edward Hamilton (pastoralist) =

British politician (1809-1898)

Edward William Terrick Hamilton

Member of Parliament for Salisbury
- In office 1865–1869 Serving with Matthew Henry Marsh (1865–1868); John Alfred Lush (1868–1869)
- Preceded by: Matthew Henry Marsh; Edward Pery Buckley
- Succeeded by: John Alfred Lush; Alfred Seymour

High Sheriff of Berkshire
- In office 1879–1879
- Preceded by: Arthur Smith
- Succeeded by: Robert Burn Blyth

Personal details
- Born: 26 November 1809 Loughton, Essex, England
- Died: 28 September 1898 (aged 88) Charters House, Sunningdale, Berkshire, England
- Parent: Rev Anthony Hamilton (father)
- Relatives: Anthony Hamilton (paternal grandfather); Richard Terrick (maternal grandfather); Walter Kerr Hamilton (brother); William Richard Hamilton (uncle)
- Education: Eton College
- Alma mater: Trinity College, Cambridge

Edward William Terrick Hamilton (26 November 1809 – 28 September 1898) was a British businessman and politician who spent fifteen years as a pastoralist in New South Wales.

== Early life ==
Born in Loughton, Essex, he was the son of the Reverend Anthony Hamilton and his wife Charity, née Farquhar. His older brother, Walter Kerr Hamilton, was Bishop of Salisbury from 1854 – 1869.

He was educated at Eton College and Trinity College, Cambridge. He graduated with a BA in 1832 and M.A. in 1835. He was made a fellow of the college in 1834. He was called to the bar at the Inner Temple in 1832.

== New South Wales ==
Hamilton decided not to take up a legal career, instead choosing to take up "pastoralism" or the raising of livestock in New South Wales, with the aim of making a sufficient fortune to return to England and live as a gentleman of leisure. In 1839 he purchased a cattle and sheep station near Cassilis, New South Wales with his cousin, Captain H G Hamilton, RN and friend George Clive. He moved to New South Wales in February 1840 to manage the station, and remained there for 15 years. He was nominated to the New South Wales Legislative Council in 1843. He resigned from the body in 1846 but was reappointed in 1848, serving until 1850. He married Ann Thacker of Berkshire and New South Wales in August 1844. In 1851 he was appointed the first provost of the University of Sydney, resigning in 1854.

== Return to England ==
In January 1855 Hamilton returned to England, having sold his shares in the livestock stations. He was appointed chairman of the London-based Australian Agricultural Company in 1854, a position he held until his death. He was also appointed chairman of the Bank of Australasia.

== Member of parliament ==
At the 1865 general election Hamilton was elected to the Parliament of the United Kingdom as one of two members of parliament for the City of Salisbury. In August 1869 Hamilton resigned his parliamentary seat.

== Later life ==
Hamilton continued with his business activities until his death. He maintained his links with New South Wales, and was the colony's representative agent in London for some years. He made his home at Charters, Sunningdale, Berkshire, and was appointed High Sheriff in 1879. He died there in 1898 survived by 2 sons and 6 daughters.

Academic offices
| Preceded by New Office | Provost of the University of Sydney; 1851–1854 | Succeeded by Charles Nicholson |
Parliament of the United Kingdom
| Preceded by Matthew Henry Marsh; Edward Pery Buckley | Member of Parliament for Salisbury; 1865–1869; With: Matthew Henry Marsh 1865–1868; John Alfred Lush 1868–1869 | Succeeded by John Alfred Lush; Alfred Seymour |
Honorary titles
| Preceded by Arthur Smith | High Sheriff of Berkshire; 1879 | Succeeded by Robert Bur Blyth |
