= Farquhar (disambiguation) =

Farquhar is a surname of Scottish origin. Farquhar may also refer to:

== Places ==
- Cape Farquhar, Western Australia
- Farquhar Group, a group of islands that are part of the Seychelles
  - Farquhar Atoll, an atoll within the Farquhar Group
    - Farquhar Airport, on the atoll
- Farquhar Glacier, Greenland
- Farquhar Lake, Ontario, Canada
- Mount Farquhar, California, United States
- Farquhar Peak, Minnesota, United States
- 5256 Farquhar, an asteroid

== People ==
- Fearchar, Earl of Ross (died 1251?), often anglicized as Farquhar MacTaggart, Scottish nobleman, first Earl of Ross
- Farquhar Buzzard (1871–1945), British physician and Oxford professor
- Farquhar McGillivray Knowles (1859–1932), Canadian painter
- Farquhar Wilkinson (1932–2022), New Zealand cellist

== Ships ==
- USS Farquhar (DE-139), an Edsall-class destroyer escort built for the U.S. Navy during World War II
- USS Farquhar (DD-304), a Clemson-class destroyer built for the United States Navy during World War I

== Other uses ==
- Farquhar Cattle Ranch, Alabama, United States, a state prison for men
- Farquhar Street, George Town, Penang, Malaysia
- Farquhar baronets, three baronetcies

== See also ==
- Farquhar-Hill rifle, a British design, one of the first semi-automatic rifles designed in the early 20th century
- Farquahr, an American folk band
- Farquar Lake, Minnesota, United States
