= Lord Belhaven and Stenton =

Title in the Peerage of Scotland

Lordship of Belhaven & Stenton
- Creation date: 15 December 1647
- Created by: King Charles I
- Peerage: Peerage of Scotland
- First holder: John Hamilton
- Present holder: Frederick Carmichael Arthur Hamilton
- Heir apparent: William Richard Hamilton, Master of Belhaven
- Remainder to: the 1st Baron's heirs male of the body lawfully begotten, failing which to his heirs male whatsoever; from 10 Feb 1675 also with remainder to John Hamilton of Presmennan and the heirs male of his body, whom failing to the nearest heirs male of John Hamilton of Presmennan whatsoever

Lord Belhaven and Stenton, of the County of Haddington, is a Lordship of Parliament in the Peerage of Scotland. It was created in 1647 for Sir John Hamilton, 2nd Baronet, with remainder to his heirs male.

== History ==
This branch of the prominent Hamilton family descends from John Hamilton (d. c. 1550), the illegitimate son of James Hamilton, 1st Lord Hamilton, by Janet Calderwood, and half-brother of James Hamilton, 1st Earl of Arran (from whom the Dukes of Hamilton descend; for earlier history of the Hamilton family see this title). In 1512 John's birth was legitimized. His grandson, James Hamilton, notably served as Sheriff of Perthshire. In 1634 he was created a baronet of Broomhill, in the Baronetage of Nova Scotia. He was succeeded by his son, the aforementioned second Baronet, who was elevated to the peerage in 1647. The following year he was a member of the Scottish army in England that attempted to rescue King Charles I, and fought at the Battle of Preston.

As Lord Belhaven and Stenton had no male heirs, he surrendered the lordship to the Crown in 1675 and received a new patent with remainder to his kinsman John Hamilton of Pressmannan, the husband of his granddaughter Margaret, and in failure of that line to his heirs whatsoever. On his death in 1679 the baronetcy became extinct while he was succeeded in the lordship according to the new patent by John Hamilton of Pressmannan, the second Lord. He was the great-great-great-grandson of John Hamilton, brother of Claud Hamilton, grandfather of the first Lord. On his death, the title passed to his son, the third Lord. He sat in the House of Lords as a Scottish representative peer from 1715 to 1721. In the latter year, he was appointed Governor of Barbados but drowned on the journey out. By Anne, daughter of Andrew Bruce, Merchant of Edinburgh, he had four sons (1st. John, 2nd. Andrew, 3rd. James, 4th, Robert) and a daughter Margaret. His eldest son John Hamilton succeeded to his father's title, becoming 4th Baron Belhaven and Stenton, and died unmarried on 28 August 1764. His next brother Andrew, having died unmarried in 1736, the title was inherited by the 3rd son James Hamilton, who became 5th Baron of Belhaven and Stenton. On James's death in 1777, the line of the second Lord failed since Robert Hamilton, the youngest of the 3rd Baron's sons, had died in 1743.

There now arose controversy as to the succession of the title. In 1777 it was incorrectly assumed by Captain William Hamilton, the great-great-great-great-grandson of John Hamilton of Coltness, younger son of John Hamilton of Udston, whose other son James Hamilton was the grandfather of the second Lord, and whose grandfather John Hamilton was the brother of the aforementioned Claud Hamilton, grandfather of the first Lord Belhaven and Stenton. William voted at the Election of Scottish Peers in 1790. However, it was resolved by the Committee for Privileges of the House of Lords in 1793 that this vote was not valid. The title was instead determined in favour of William Hamilton, the seventh Lord. He was the son of Robert Hamilton of Wishaw (who was adjudged de jure sixth Lord), grandson of Robert Hamilton, "Younger of Wishaw", son of Robert Hamilton, 3rd of Wishaw, son of William Hamilton, 1st of Wishaw, son of John Hamilton of Udston, grandson of John Hamilton, brother of the aforesaid Claude Hamilton, grandfather of the first Lord.

The seventh Lord was succeeded by his son, the eighth Lord. He was a Scottish Representative Peer from 1819 to 1831 and also served as Lord Lieutenant of Lanarkshire. In 1831 he was created Baron Hamilton of Wishaw, in the County of Lanark, in the Peerage of the United Kingdom, which gave him an automatic seat in the House of Lords. However, this title became extinct on his death in 1868, while the lordship became dormant. In 1875, the House of Lords decided that the rightful successor was James Hamilton, the ninth Lord. He was the son of Archibald Hamilton, grandson of James Hamilton, younger son of the aforesaid Robert Hamilton, Younger of Wishaw. Lord Belhaven and Stenton notably served as Lord-Lieutenant of Lanarkshire.

He had seven daughters but no sons, and on his death the title was claimed by his kinsman Alexander Charles Hamilton, the tenth Lord. He was the son of geologist William Hamilton (Member of Parliament for Newport, Isle of Wight), son of William Richard Hamilton (Permanent Under-Secretary at the Foreign Office), son of the Venerable Anthony Hamilton (Archdeacon of Colchester), son of Alexander Hamilton, younger son of the aforementioned William Hamilton, 3rd of Wishaw. In 1894, his claim was admitted by the House of Lords. He later served as a Scottish Representative Peer from 1900 to 1920. He was succeeded by his nephew, the eleventh Lord. He was an officer in the Indian Army and also sat in the House of Lords as a Scottish Representative Peer between 1922 and 1945. In 1934, he assumed the additional surname of Udny. However, none of the subsequent Lords have held this surname.

== Coat of arms ==
The heraldic blazon for the coat of arms of the lordship is: Quarterly: 1st and 4th, gules, a mullet argent between three cinquefoils ermine (for Hamilton of Udston); 2nd and 3rd, gules, a man's heart proper shadowed or between three cinquefoils ermine (for Hamilton of Raploch); all within a bordure argent.

== Hamilton Baronets of Broomhill (1634) ==
- Sir James Hamilton, 1st Baronet (died c. 1645)
- Sir John Hamilton, 2nd Baronet (d. 1679) (created Lord Belhaven and Stenton in 1647)

== Lords Belhaven and Stenton (1647) ==
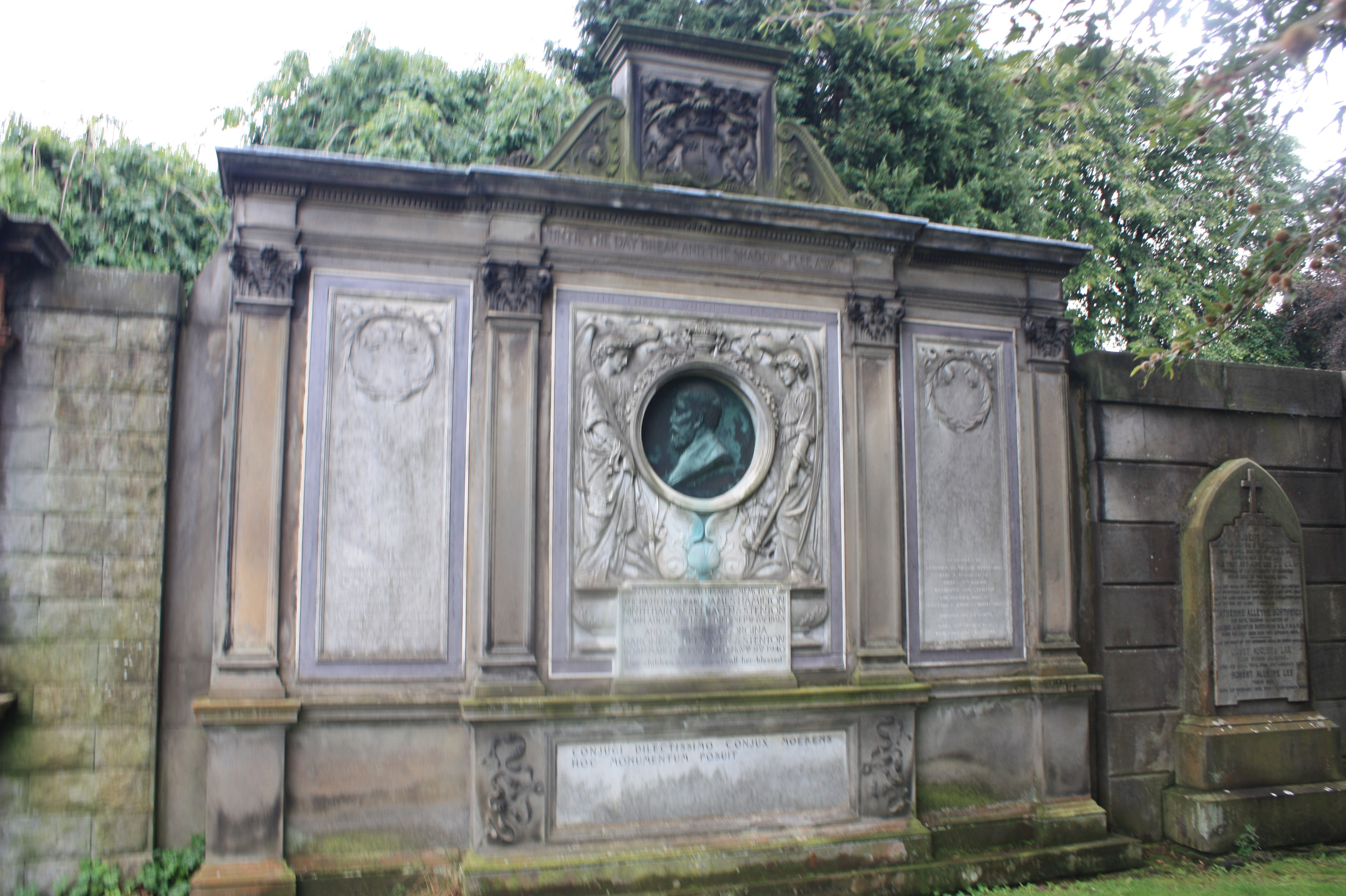
Monument to James Hamilton, 9th Lord Belhaven and Stenton, Dean Cemetery by Pilkington Jackson

- John Hamilton, 1st Lord Belhaven and Stenton (d. 1679) (baronetcy extinct)
- John Hamilton, 2nd Lord Belhaven and Stenton (1656–1708)
- John Hamilton, 3rd Lord Belhaven and Stenton (d. 1721)
- John Hamilton, 4th Lord Belhaven and Stenton (d. 1764)
- James Hamilton, 5th Lord Belhaven and Stenton (d. 1777)
- Robert Hamilton, 6th Lord Belhaven and Stenton (1731–1784)
- William Hamilton, 7th Lord Belhaven and Stenton (1765–1814)
- Robert Montgomery Hamilton, 8th Lord Belhaven and Stenton (1793–1868) (dormant 1868)
- James Hamilton, 9th Lord Belhaven and Stenton (1822–1893) (revived 1875)
- Alexander Charles Hamilton, 10th Lord Belhaven and Stenton (1840–1920)
- Robert Edward Archibald Udny-Hamilton, 11th Lord Belhaven and Stenton (1871–1950)
- Robert Alexander Benjamin Hamilton, 12th Lord Belhaven and Stenton (1903–1961)
- Robert Anthony Carmichael Hamilton, 13th Lord Belhaven and Stenton (1927–2020)
- Frederick Carmichael Arthur Hamilton, 14th Lord Belhaven and Stenton (b. 1953)

The heir apparent is the present holder’s son, William Richard Hamilton (b. 1982)

== See also ==
- Duke of Hamilton
