= Sir Walter Farquhar, 5th Baronet =

English World War I captain

Captain Sir Walter Randolph Fitzroy Farquhar, 5th Baronet (31 May 1878 – 15 October 1918) was an English diplomat and soldier of Scottish heritage.

== Early life ==
Farquhar was born on 31 May 1878. He was the only son of Walter Randolph Farquhar (1842–1901) and Hon. Kathleen Mary Bateson (1852–1935).

His paternal grandparents were Sir Walter Farquhar, 3rd Baronet and Lady Mary Somerset (youngest daughter of the 6th Duke of Beaufort). His maternal grandparents were Thomas Bateson, 1st Baron Deramore and Hon. Caroline Rice-Trevor (a daughter of the 4th Baron Dynevor, MP for Carmarthenshire).

== Career ==
Farquhar served as honorary attaché to the British Legation in Saint Petersburg in 1898. He was aide-de-camp to Charles Cochrane-Baillie, 2nd Baron Lamington in Australia when Lamington was Governor of Queensland. He also served for some time as Assistant Private Secretary to Thomas Thynne, 5th Marquess of Bath while Bath was Under-Secretary of State for India.

=== Military service ===
A temporary Captain in the Royal Army Service Corps and in the Royal Field Artillery, he fought in World War I in the Gallipoli campaign, and in Egypt and France. He also served as aide-de-camp to Brig.-Gen. Albemarle Cator, 58th (2/1st London) Division. Sir Walter was killed in action at the Front in France on 15 October 1918.

Upon the death of his uncle, Sir Henry Farquhar, 4th Baronet, on 15 January 1916, he succeeded as the 5th Baronet Farquhar, which had been created in 1796 for his ancestor, Walter Farquhar, a prominent Scottish physician.

== Personal life ==
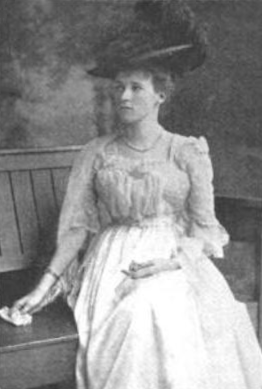
Violet Maud Corkran

On 17 December 1903, Farquhar was married to Violet Maud Corkran at St Peter's Church, Eaton Square. Violet was a daughter of Col. Charles Seymour Corkran of the Coldstream Guards and Florence Caroline (née Peel) Corkran. Among her siblings were brothers, Maj.-Gen. Sir Charles Corkran and courtier Sir Victor Corkran. Together, they lived in Eaton Square in London's Belgravia district, and were the parents of:

- Sir Peter Walter Farquhar, 6th Baronet (1904–1986), a Lt.-Col. in the 16th/5th Lancers who fought in World War II where he was twice wounded; he married Elizabeth Evelyn Hurt, daughter of Lt.-Col. Francis Cecil Albert Hurt, in 1937.
- Charles Richard Farquhar (1906–1980), a Col. in the Staffordshire Yeomanry who fought in World War II; he married Dorothy Nancy Johnson, daughter of Maj. James Gerald Thewlis Johnson, in 1939.
- Reginald Arthur Farquhar (1908–1937), a Pilot Officer in the Royal Air Force who married Betty Isobel Crawford, daughter of John Shields Crawford, in 1933.
- Ruth Violet Mary Farquhar (1910–2007), who married Maj. Richard Fanshawe, son of Lt.-Gen. Sir Edward Fanshawe, in 1932. They divorced in 1961 and she married Frederick Wills, 2nd Baron Dulverton, in 1962.

Following his death on 15 October 1918, at age 40, he was succeeded in the baronetcy by his eldest son, Peter, who was 14 at the time. He left an estate of £18,391.

Baronetage of Great Britain
Preceded by Henry Thomas Farquhar	Baronet (of Cadogan House); 1916–1918	Succeeded by Peter Walter Farquhar
