= William Hamilton (antiquarian) =

Scottish antiquarian

William Hamilton (died 1724) was a Scottish antiquarian.

== Life ==
He was a son of William Hamilton of Wishaw in Lanarkshire, and grandson of John Hamilton of Udston who claimed descent from James Hamilton of Cadzow; his mother was Beatrix, daughter of James Douglas of Morton. The third son in a large family, he ultimately succeeded to the family estate of Wishaw.

Hamilton was a reputed antiquarian and genealogist, praised by George Crawfurd, and an acknowledged supporter of Alexander Nisbet's System of Heraldry (1722). He died at an advanced age in 1724, having been born in the 1630s.

== Works ==
Hamilton left in manuscript an Account of the Shyres of Renfrew and Lanark, which went to the Advocates' Library, Edinburgh. In 1832 it was published as one of the volumes of the Maitland Club, edited by William Motherwell, and consists of brief topographical descriptions of the principal castles and mansions in Renfrewshire and Lanarkshire, with genealogical information on local families.

== Family ==
Hamilton married, first, in 1660, his first cousin, Anne, daughter of John Hamilton of Udston, with whom he had six sons and a daughter. Secondly, he married in 1676 Mary, eldest daughter of the Hon. Sir Charles Erskine, son of John, 7th Earl of Mar, by whom he had five sons and six daughters. Of those:

- William Hamilton, the third son of the marriage, was the father of William Gerard Hamilton; and
- Alexander, the fifth son, was grandfather to William Richard Hamilton.

== The Belhaven title and descent ==
Robert, the second son of the first marriage, died during his father's life; his son William inherited Wishaw on the death of his grandfather. By an entail executed by John Hamilton, 2nd Lord Belhaven, Robert, son of this William Hamilton, should have succeeded to the title Lord Belhaven and Stenton. He did not assume the dignity, however, and his eldest son, who claimed the title, became seventh Lord Belhaven. His son Robert Montgomery Hamilton (1793–1868) was eighth Lord Belhaven and Stenton. The title was then adjudged to a distant relation, who became James Hamilton, 9th Lord Belhaven and Stenton, by the House of Lords in 1875.

== Notes ==
Attribution

This article incorporates text from a publication now in the public domain: Stephen, Leslie; Lee, Sidney, eds. (1890). "Hamilton, William (d.1724)". Dictionary of National Biography. Vol. 24. London: Smith, Elder & Co.
