= Farquhar baronets of Cadogan House (1796) =

Farquhar baronets of Cadogan House

The Farquhar baronetcy of Cadogan House in the County of Middlesex was created in the Baronetage of Great Britain on 1 March 1796 for Walter Farquhar, Physician to George IV when Prince of Wales and subsequently President of the Royal College of Physicians.

== Farquhar baronets, of Cadogan House (1796) ==
- Sir Walter Farquhar, 1st Baronet (1738–1819)
- Sir Thomas Harvie Farquhar, 2nd Baronet (1775–1836)
- Sir Walter Rockliffe Farquhar, 3rd Baronet (1810–1900)
- Sir Henry Thomas Farquhar, 4th Baronet (1838–1916)
- Sir Walter Randolph Fitzroy Farquhar, 5th Baronet (1878–1918)
- Sir Peter Walter Farquhar, 6th Baronet (1904–1986)
- Sir Michael Fitzroy Henry Farquhar, 7th Baronet (born 1938)

The heir apparent is the present holder's son Charles Walter FitzRoy Farquhar (born 1964).

== Extended family ==
Sir Harold Farquhar, grandson of Harvie Morton Farquhar, second son of the 2nd Baronet, was a diplomat and served as British Ambassador to Sweden between 1948 and 1951.

== Notes ==
Baronetage of Great Britain
Preceded by Burges baronets	Farquhar baronets of Cadogan House; 1 March 1796	Succeeded by Pellew baronets
