= Anthony Hamilton (archdeacon of Taunton) =

Anthony Hamilton (12 July 1778 – 10 September 1851) was Archdeacon of Taunton from 5 December 1827 until his death.

== Life ==
He was the younger son of Anthony Hamilton (Archdeacon of Colchester) and his wife Anne Terrick, daughter of Richard Terrick. His older brother was William Richard Hamilton.

Hamilton was educated at Harrow School, He was admitted in 1796 at St John's College, Cambridge, matriculating and graduating B.A. in 1800, graduating M.A. in 1803.

Hamiliton married Charity Graeme Farquhar, third daughter of Sir Walter Farquhar, 1st Baronet, physician to the Prince Regent; their eldest son was Walter Kerr Hamilton, and their younger son was Edward William Terrick Hamilton.
