= Robert W. Hamilton =

Robert W. Hamilton may refer to:

- Robert Wilson Hamilton (1819–1904), American-born lawyer and judge in Fiji
- Sir Robert Hamilton (Liberal politician) (Robert William Hamilton, 1867–1944), Scottish Member of Parliament for Orkney and Shetland
- Robert W. Hamilton (judge) (1899–1981), Justice of the Texas Supreme Court
- Robert Hamilton (archaeologist) (Robert William Hamilton, 1905–1995), British archaeologist and academic
- Robert William Hamilton Jr. (1930–2011), hyperbaric physiologist
- Robert W. Hamilton (law professor) (1931–2018), American law professor
  - Robert W. Hamilton Book Award, a writing award named for the professor
- Robert W. Hamilton House, a historic house built in Murphysboro, Illinois, in 1867

== See also ==
- Robert Hamilton (disambiguation)
