= Sir Walter Farquhar, 1st Baronet =

Scottish physician

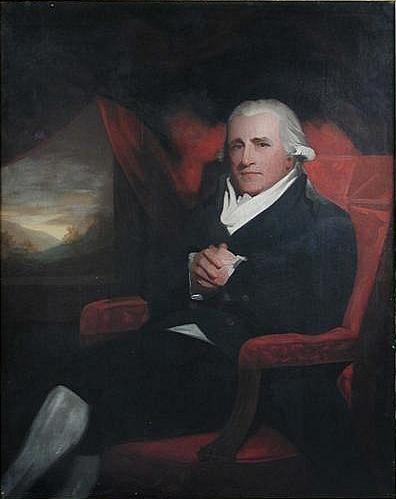
Sir Walter Farquhar, 1st Bt., by Raeburn, c. 1790

Sir Walter Farquhar, 1st Baronet (October 1738 – 30 March 1819) was a Scottish physician of the late eighteenth and early nineteenth century, whose clientele included many of the leading figures of the day, including the Prince of Wales (later King George IV) and the Prime Minister William Pitt. Farquhar abandoned his medical studies at King's College, Aberdeen to join the British Army as a surgeon during the Seven Years' War. He later worked as an apothecary in London and qualified as a physician, becoming popular with royalty and politicians and receiving a baronetcy for his services.

== Early life ==
Farquhar was born in Garioch in 1738, the son of Robert Farquhar, the minister at Garioch. His mother was Katherine (née Turing), the daughter of another minister.

== Career ==
Farquhar took a degree at King's College, Aberdeen and began to study medicine under James Gregory. In 1760, however he abandoned his medical studies in Edinburgh and Glasgow and joined the 19th Regiment of Foot in the British Army as a surgeon. In 1761, the regiment was sent to Belle Île and subsequently to Gibraltar, where it remained at the end of the conflict.

Farquhar left the regiment at Gibraltar and spent 18 months travelling and studying medicine in France, working with Claude Nicolas le Cat in Rouen. In 1769, citing ill-health, Farquhar retired from the army and moved to London, opening an apothecary shop in Great Marlborough Street with his wife Anne Harvie, widow of a London doctor. Farquhar's practice gradually developed a steady clientele and he became a physician, awarded his MD from King's College, Aberdeen in 1796. He was made a Fellow of the Royal College of Physicians of Edinburgh and a licenceate of the Royal College of Physicians in the same year.

Among Farquhar's clients were many prominent figures of the period, including the Prince of Wales, Prime Minister William Pitt the Younger and prominent politician Lord Melville. This patronage led to him being awarded a baronetcy in 1796 and was soon appointed physician-in-ordinary to the Prince of Wales. With his reputation secured, Farquhar ran a very successful business until his retirement in 1813 with health problems.

== Personal life ==
On 20 June 1771, Farquhar was married to Anne (née Stevenson) Harvie, a daughter of Thomas Stevenson and widow of Dr. Thomas Harvie. Together, they were the parents of:

- Anne Farquhar (1774–1844), who married the Rev. James Hook in 1797.
- Sir Thomas Harvie Farquhar, 2nd Baronet (1775–1836), who married Sybella Martha Rockcliffe, daughter of Rev. Morton Rockcliffe, in 1809.
- Sir Robert Townsend Farquhar, 1st Baronet (1776–1830), who married Maria Frances Geslip de Lautour in 1809.
- Walter Farquhar (1778–1813), who married Maynard Eliza D'Oyly, daughter of Sir John D'Oyly, 6th Baronet, in 1805.
- John Farquhar (b. 1779), who died young.
- Charity Graeme Farquhar (1781–1869), who married the Ven. Anthony Hamilton, son of Ven. Anthony Hamilton, in 1807.
- Elizabeth Margaret Farquhar (b. 1783)

Farquhar died in London in March 1819 and was buried at St Martin-in-the-Fields in Westminster. His baronetcy passed to his eldest son, Sir Thomas Harvie Farquhar, 2nd Baronet, although it was his second son Robert Townsend Farquhar who was most successful, becoming the governor of Penang and Mauritius and, subsequently, a Member of Parliament. In 1821 he was awarded a baronetcy separate to that of his father. Although Sir Walter Farquhar was a very successful physician of his day, he did not publish or develop any medical knowledge and thus he had no lasting impact on British medicine.

=== Descendants ===
Through his eldest son, he was a grandfather of Sir Walter Farquhar, 3rd Baronet, High Sheriff of Surrey who married Lady Mary Octavia Somerset (daughter of Henry Somerset, 6th Duke of Beaufort and Lady Charlotte Leveson-Gower). Through his second son Robert, he was a grandfather of Sir Walter Townsend-Farquhar, 2nd Baronet, MP for Hertford.

Through his daughter Charity, he was a grandfather of Walter Kerr Hamilton and Edward William Terrick Hamilton.

Baronetage of Great Britain
New creation	Baronet (of Cadogan House); 1796–1819	Succeeded by Thomas Harvie Farquhar
