= Walter Kerr Hamilton =

English priest and bishop (1808–1869)

The Right Reverend Walter Kerr Hamilton
- Bishop of Salisbury
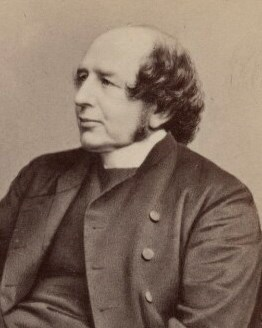
- Church: Church of England
- Diocese: Diocese of Salisbury
- In office: 1854–1869
- Predecessor: Edward Denison
- Successor: George Moberly

Orders
- Ordination: 2 June 1833 (deacon); 22 December 1833 (priest)
- Consecration: 14 May 1854

Personal details
- Denomination: Anglican
- Born: 16 November 1808; London, UK
- Died: 1 August 1869 (aged 60); Salisbury, UK
- Education: Eton College
- Alma mater: Christ Church, Oxford
- Spouse: Isabel Elizabeth Lear (m. 1845)
- Father: Rev Anthony Hamilton
- Relatives: Anthony Hamilton (paternal grandfather); Richard Terrick (maternal grandfather); Edward Hamilton (brother); William Richard Hamilton (uncle)

Walter Kerr Hamilton (16 November 1808 – 1 August 1869) was a Church of England priest, Bishop of Salisbury from 1854 until his death.

== Biography ==
He was born on 16 November 1808, educated at Eton College, tutored by Thomas Arnold, and then attended Christ Church, University of Oxford, where he took a first class degree in Greats. He was elected to a Fellowship at Merton College, Oxford in 1832. He was made deacon in 1833 and ordained priest in December of the same year. He was a curate at Wolvercote 1833–34, then served as curate to Edward Denison, another Fellow at Merton and vicar at the parish of St Peter-in-the-East. Upon Denison's appointment as Bishop of Salisbury in 1837, Hamilton succeeded him as vicar, remaining until 1841. He subsequently became a canon-resident of Salisbury.

Upon Denison's death on 1 August 1854, aged 60, Hamilton succeeded him as Bishop. In 1860, he founded Salisbury Theological College (now Sarum College).

His private papers are currently in the possession of the Archives of Pusey House, Oxford.

== Family ==
Hamilton was born into an ecclesiastical family, the son of Anthony Hamilton (Archdeacon of Taunton), the nephew of William Richard Hamilton, and the grandson of Anthony Hamilton (Archdeacon of Colchester) and his wife Anne Terrick, daughter of Richard Terrick (Bishop of London).

Hamilton married Isabel Elizabeth Lear on 9 January 1845. His daughter, Eleanor Frances Hamilton, married Ernest Kingscote (9 September 1856 – 16 June 1934) in 1887.

Church of England titles
Preceded by Edward Denison	Bishop of Salisbury; 1854–1869	Succeeded by George Moberly
