= Mushtaq Ahmad (Scottish politician) =

Lord Lieutenant of Lanarkshire

Mushtaq Ahmad OBE (12 November 1942 – 15 September 2024) was a Scottish Labour Party politician who served as the Lord Lieutenant of Lanarkshire from 2010 until 2017.

== Biography ==
Ahmad was born on 12 November 1942 in British India where he grew up in the city of Lahore. He graduated from the University of Punjab in Pakistan. In 1963, he came to Scotland from Pakistan to study for an MA at the University of Glasgow. He undertook teacher training at Jordanhill College, and went on to teach economics in Scotland and then East London. Returning to Scotland, he organised an adult education programme for 17 years.

Ahmad served as a Labour councillor in Hamilton District Council and then South Lanarkshire Council, and was Provost of South Lanarkshire from 2003 to 2007. He was the first Asian to serve as Provost of a Scottish council. He was awarded an OBE in the 2008 New Year Honours. He was appointed to the post of Lord Lieutenant on 11 November 2010, following the retirement of Gilbert Cox. He held the office until 12 November 2017.

Ahmad died on 15 September 2024.
