= Townsend-Farquhar baronets of Mauritius (1821) =

Escutcheon of the Townsend-Farquhar baronets of Mauritius

The Townsend-Farquhar baronetcy, of Mauritius, was created in the Baronetage of the United Kingdom on 21 August 1821 for Robert Townsend-Farquhar, the first Governor of Mauritius and Member of Parliament for Newton and Hythe. He was the second son of the 1st Baronet of the 1796 creation.

The 2nd Baronet represented Hertford in the House of Commons. The title became extinct on the death of the 6th Baronet, an artist, in 1924.

== Townsend-Farquhar baronets, of Mauritius (1821) ==
- Sir Robert Townsend Townsend-Farquhar, 1st Baronet (1776–1830)
- Sir Walter Minto Townsend-Farquhar, 2nd Baronet (1809–1866)
- Sir Eric Robert Townsend-Farquhar, 3rd Baronet (1836–1867)
- Sir Minto Walter Townsend-Farquhar, 4th Baronet (1837–1872)
- Sir John Henry Townsend-Farquhar, 5th Baronet (1839–1877)
- Sir Robert Townsend-Farquhar, 6th Baronet (1841–1924)

== Notes ==
Baronetage of the United Kingdom
Preceded by Jolliffe baronets	Townsend-Farquhar baronets of Mauritius; 21 August 1821	Succeeded by Fuller-Eliott-Drake baronets
