= Orrin Thompson (real estate developer) =

- Orrin Thompson, real estate developer

Orrin Thompson (August 26, 1913 – March 7, 1995) was one of the largest real-estate developers in the United States. In the 1950s, a time when the post World War II population was exploding and in need of housing, he built and sold thousands of one-family homes, primarily in Minnesota. He contributed significantly to the creation of the mode of life in the twentieth century that became known as the suburb.

== Building plans, methods and growth ==
Thompson and his company, Orrin Thompson Homes, built rows and rows of modestly priced new homes that were termed subdivisions or tract housing. He then offered them to the generation known as the Greatest Generation.

To keep his prices down, he saved on building costs in a number of ways: by taking ideas from the assembly line, by creating great quantities of houses, by building them in proximity to each other, and by using the same plans over and over. In the 1950s these newly built homes were priced around $12,000. Also, Thompson was able to build on inexpensive land away from the city, because the automobile and the public streets and highways had come of age, which gave homeowners greater mobility and the ability to commute.

Beginning with a few acres of prairie, Thompson created entirely new communities; first each basement would be excavated and constructed of cinder blocks, then each house would be erected on top of that, then the new family would move in. Lawns were then planted. The next step would be the addition of sewer systems, natural gas pipelines, then asphalt streets. The communities grew, accompanied by the development of businesses and schools, and in some cases communities developed into cities where there had been no cities. His large real-estate developments occurred in the Minnesota cities of Edina, Richfield, Bloomington, Cottage Grove, Apple Valley, and Coon Rapids.

In the 1960s Orrin Thompson's son Gary Thompson became a key part of the company, as the company branched out to include an electrical contracting firm, a lumber yard and millwork company, a heavy equipment and cement company.

=== Changes to the business model ===
In the 1950s and 1960s Orrin Thompson’s business model was based on low prices and selling big numbers of houses — 1400 per year. Then the market began to change, and profits dipped down to only $400 a house. The company responded: In 1966 they began selling fewer but more expensive and profitable houses. The cost of a house went up to $22,000 to $30,000. They also reduced the numbers of employees in the crew that built each house, and that worked in the office. Then they added variety to the design of each house, so that houses with identical designs were not side-by-side.

== House design ==
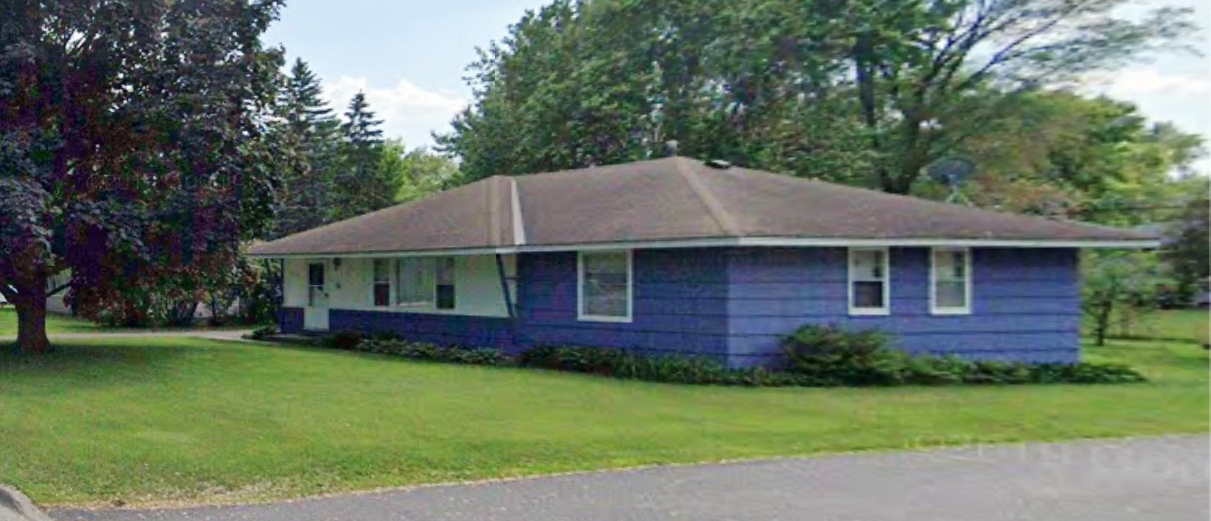
Orrin Thompson ranch style house

His typical house design was known as the rambler, or the ranch-style house; a modest one family house. Its style borrowed modern ideas that had been developed by Frank Lloyd Wright and the Prairie School. The design emphasized horizontality, large windows, a relatively flattened roof, and eaves that extend like the brim of a hat. The prototype of this style is Wright's first independent commission, with its innovative design: the William H. Winslow House of River Forrest, Illinois built in 1893.

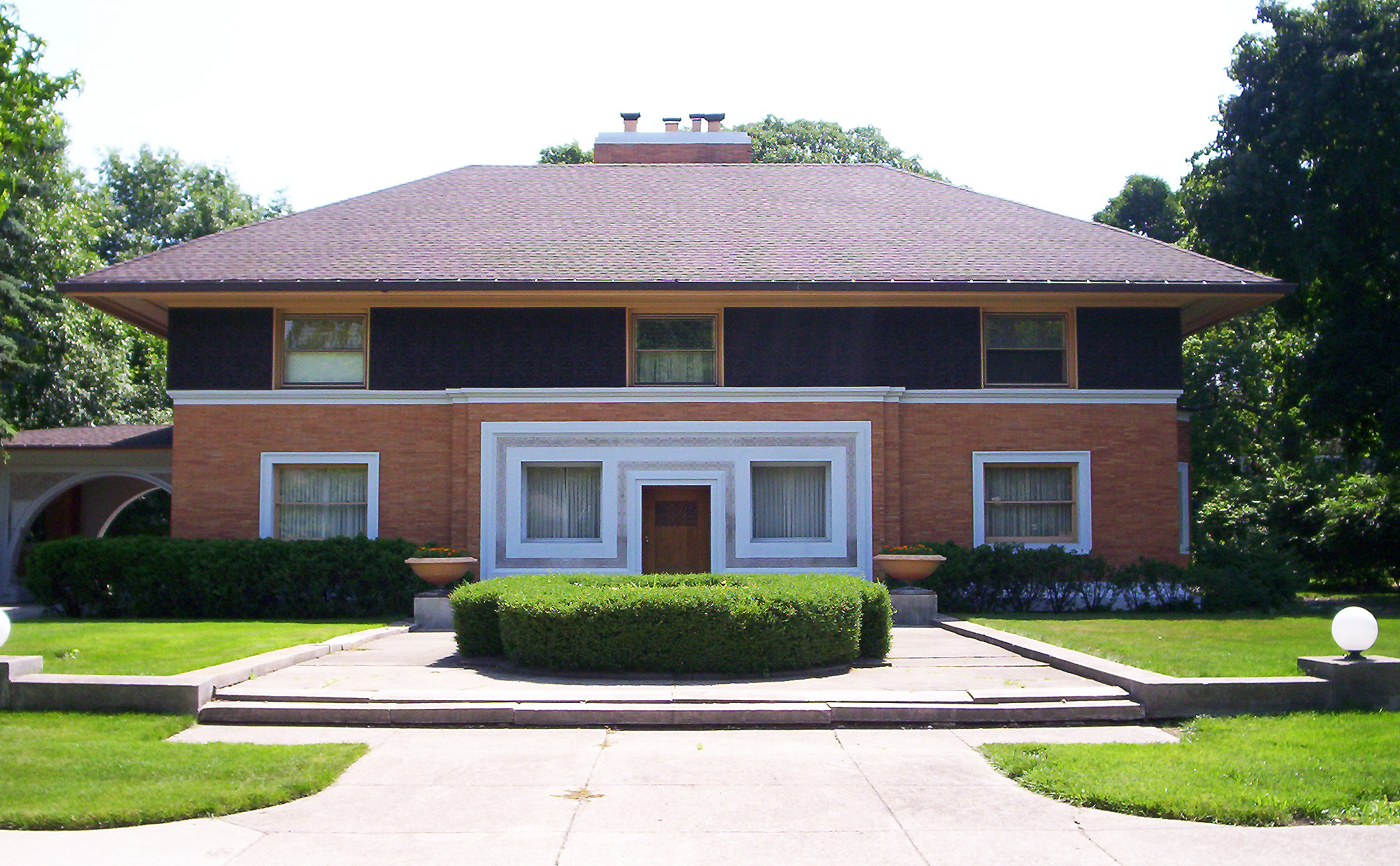
A prototype of design elements: Frank Lloyd Wright's William H. Winslow House (1893) in River Forest, Illinois

== Biography ==
Orrin Thompson grew up on the family farm near the town of Barrett, Minnesota. He believed that he would have become a farmer, had not the Great Depression forced him to take on other kinds of work.

First, he became an electrician, and then during World War II he found employment in factories in the midwest. He also worked in his brother's electric shop in south Minneapolis. When the war ended, he observed that Minnesota was having a housing crisis: Soldiers were coming home, finding few places to live and were forced to move in with relatives, or into cramped apartments, or into the metal housing structure known as the Quonset hut.

Adding to the demand for housing was the G.I. Bill, which offered veterans assistance and encouragement to purchase homes. Thompson saw this situation as an opportunity, and began building his first houses in a rural area south of Minneapolis. This development, in the township of Lebanon Hills, became the nucleus of the City of Apple Valley. Though his name was attached to all of his houses, there were few photographs taken or displayed of him, except for one that shows him standing in front of some of his first houses.

== Criticism ==
The 1950s style of suburban real-estate development is mocked by Pete Seeger in the 1962 song “Little Boxes”, and it is criticized for contributing to urban sprawl, a phenomenon which results in diminished woods and prairie.
