= Charles Corkran =

British Army general (1872–1939)

Major-General Sir Charles Corkran KCVO CB CMG
- Corkran, when a brigadier-general, c.1927
- Born: 20 August 1872
- Died: 9 January 1939 (aged 66)
- Military career
- Allegiance: United Kingdom
- Branch: British Army
- Service years: 1893–1932
- Rank: Major-General
- Unit: Grenadier Guards
- Commands: London District; Royal Military College Sandhurst; 3rd Guards Brigade; Grenadier Guards
- Conflicts: Second Boer War; First World War
- Awards: Knight Commander of the Royal Victorian Order; Companion of the Order of the Bath; Companion of the Order of St Michael and St George

Major-General Sir Charles Edward Corkran, KCVO, CB, CMG (20 August 1872 – 9 January 1939) was a senior British Army officer who served as Major-General commanding the Brigade of Guards and General Officer Commanding London District from 1928 to 1932.

== Early life ==
Corkran was born on 20 August 1872. He was the son of Colonel Charles Seymour Corkran. and educated at Eton College, Among his siblings were Sir Victor Corkran and Violet Maud Corkran (wife of Sir Walter Farquhar, 5th Baronet).

== Military career ==
Upon graduating from the Royal Military College, Sandhurst, Corkran was commissioned into the Grenadier Guards in March 1893. He was promoted to lieutenant on 12 May 1897, and served on the Nile Expedition in 1898, including at the Battle of Omdurman. He was appointed adjutant of the 2nd Battalion of his regiment on 22 October 1899, was promoted to captain on 30 November 1899, and left with his regiment for South Africa to serve in the Second Boer War in March 1900. Serving there throughout the war, he was wounded in the action at Biddulphsberg (May 1900), and was mentioned in despatches. For his service in the war, he received a brevet promotion as major in the South African Honours list published on 26 June 1902.

Following the end of hostilities in May 1902, Corkran resigned as adjutant of the 2nd Battalion on 16 September, but stayed in South Africa as he was the following day appointed aide-de-camp to Sir Neville Lyttelton, commander-in-chief (C-in-C) of South Africa. He was temporarily appointed as a deputy assistant adjutant general (DAAG) on the staff in South Africa from 11 February 1903.

Corkran, promoted on 22 December 1906 from supernumerary captain to captain, and on 14 September 1907 to major, also served in the First World War and, as commanding officer (CO) of a battalion of the Grenadier Guards, took his men to France in 1914. He was appointed a Companion of the Order of St Michael and St George in February 1915. In July 1915 he was promoted to temporary brigadier general and took command of the 2nd Division's 5th Infantry Brigade. In January 1916 he was promoted to brevet colonel.

After the war he became CO of the Grenadier Guards Regiment and then went on to be commandant of the Senior Officers' School. He was promoted on 16 August 1921 to major general and appointed commandant of the Royal Military College, Sandhurst, taking over from Major General Herbert Shoubridge, in October 1923. He was placed on half-pay 1 September 1927 and then became Major-General commanding the Brigade of Guards and General Officer Commanding London District in 1928. He retired from the army on 1 February 1932.

In retirement Corkran became Serjeant at Arms of the British House of Lords.

== Personal life ==
In 1904 Corkran married Winifred Maud Ricardo, daughter of Colonel Horace Ricardo, another commanding officer of the Grenadier Guards. They had one daughter and two sons.

Corkran died in a shooting accident on 9 January 1939.

Military offices
| Preceded by Herbert Shoubridge | Commandant of the Royal Military College Sandhurst; 1923–1927 | Succeeded by Eric Girdwood |
| Preceded by Lord Ruthven | GOC London District; 1928–1932 | Succeeded by Albemarle Cator |
