= Apple Valley, Minnesota =

City in Minnesota, United States

Apple Valley
- City
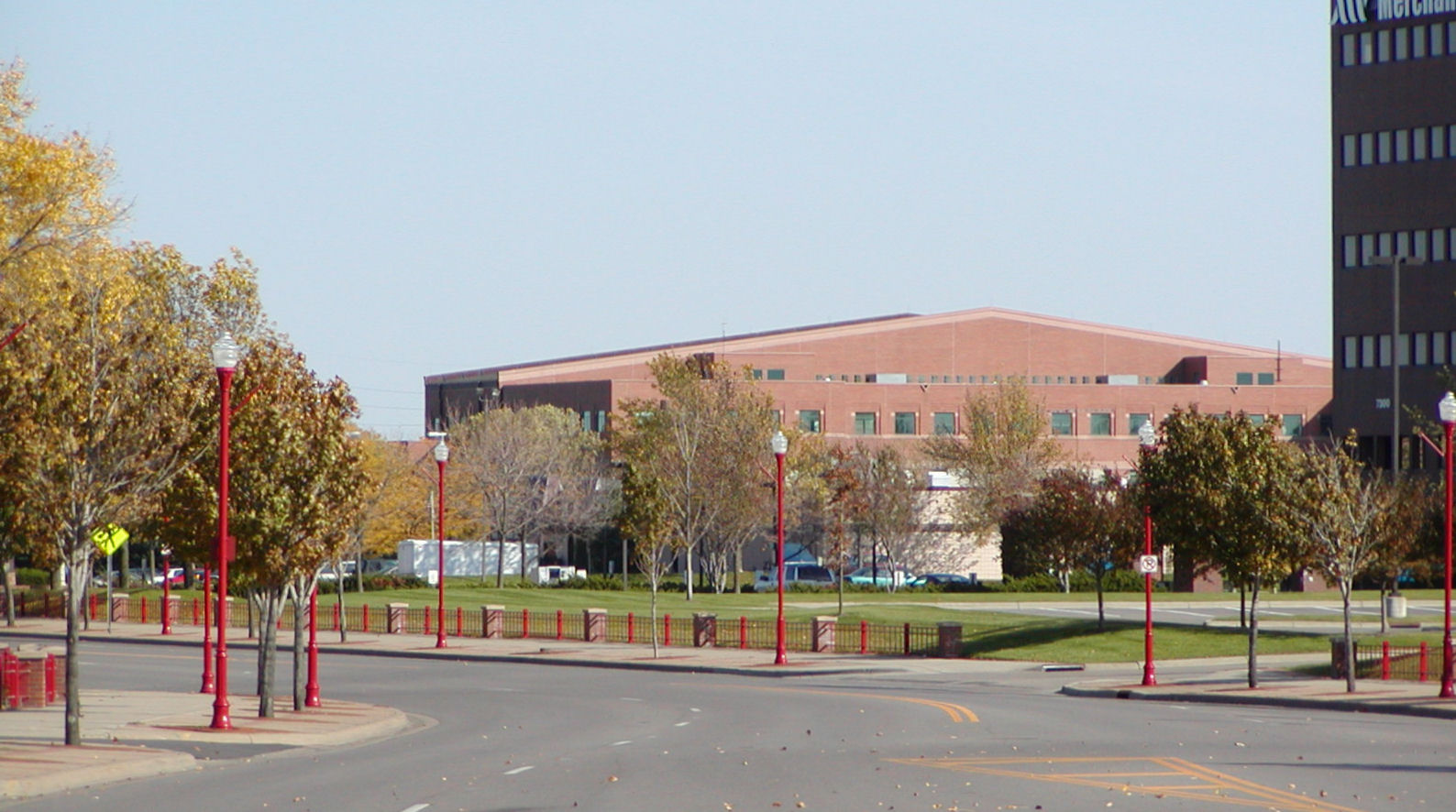
- Apple Valley

- Flag
- Motto: "Plant, Grow, Prosper"
- Location of the city of Apple Valley within Dakota County, Minnesota

- Location within Minnesota Location within the United States Location within North America
- Coordinates: 44°44′44″N 93°13′12″W
- Country: United States
- State: Minnesota
- County: Dakota
- Incorporated: 1969

Government
  - Mayor: Clint Hooppaw

Area
  - City: 17.55 sq mi (45.45 km^{2})
  - Land: 16.87 sq mi (43.69 km^{2})
  - Water: 0.68 sq mi (1.76 km^{2})
- Elevation: 974 ft (297 m)

Population (2020)
  - City: 56,374
  - Estimate (2024): 55,272
  - Rank: US: 724th MN: 17th
  - Density: 3,341.6/sq mi (1,290.18/km^{2})
  - Metro: 3,693,729 (US: 16th)
  - Demonym: Valleyian
- Time zone: UTC-6 (Central (CST))
  - Summer (DST): UTC-5 (CDT)
- ZIP Code: 55124
- Area code: 952
- FIPS code: 27-01900
- GNIS feature ID: 2393967
- Website: www.applevalleymn.gov

Apple Valley is a city in northwestern Dakota County, Minnesota, and a suburb of the Twin Cities. The population was 56,374 at the 2020 census, making it the 17th most populous city in Minnesota.

== History ==
The area that became Apple Valley was first established in 1859 as Lebanon Township, and remained a farming community for nearly a century. In the mid-1950s, residential developments started replacing farmland. Orrin Thompson, a real estate developer, was responsible for the city's early development. He contracted a company to determine where the next growth in the Twin Cities would be. It was 0.5 miles (1 km) from County Road 42 and Cedar Avenue. Thompson bought the first houses and streets from the Brobacks, who built the city's first four houses. The firm that selected this area was in Apple Valley, California, so Thompson took that name for the development. An alternate explanation for the name change exists, however. According to local developer Henry Broback, Lebanon Township was renamed Apple Valley because "...when you drive east on (County Road) 42 and turn to enter Lebanon, it reminded them of Apple Valley, California, which was a nice community."

Voters in the township voted to incorporate in the 1968 general election. They also selected the name Apple Valley over the name Lebanon Valley by a vote of 1376 to 757.

== Geography ==
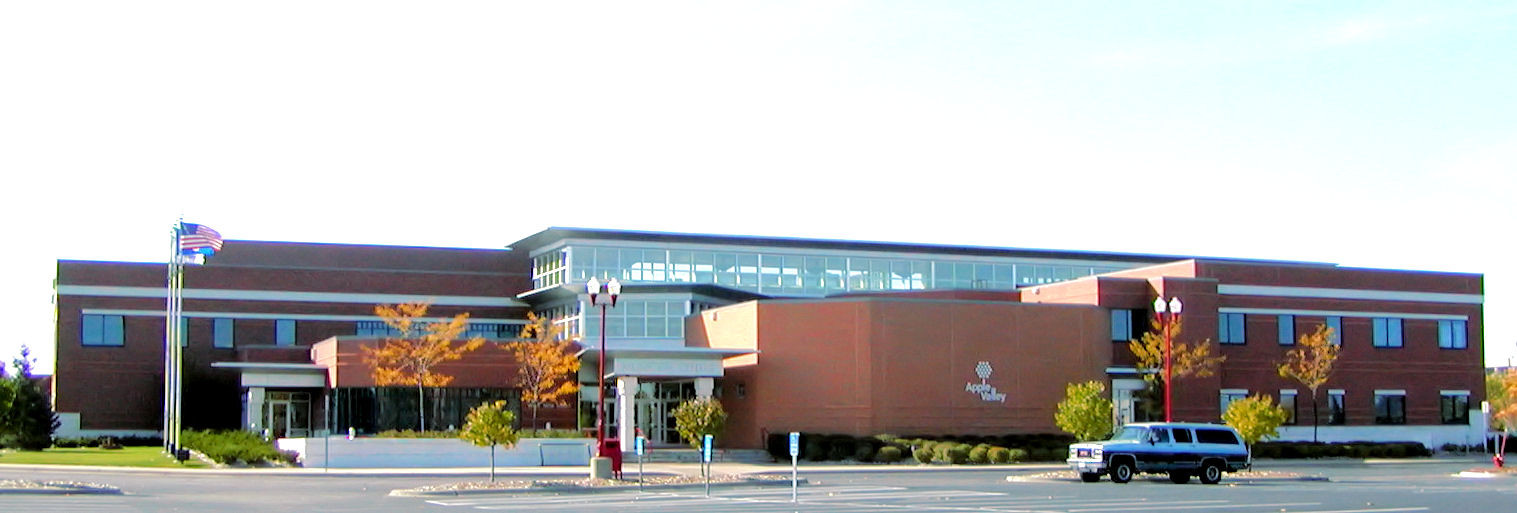
Apple Valley municipal building

According to the United States Census Bureau, the city has a total area of 17.57 square miles (45.51 km^{2}), of which 16.86 square miles (43.67 km^{2}) is land and 0.71 square miles (1.84 km^{2}) is water. The city's geography is rolling, with elevation from the lowest to the highest points in the city varying by one hundred feet (thirty metres) or more. The downtown area and its adjacent residential district (which formed the original core of the city when it was incorporated) are in a shallow valley.

Farquar Lake is located in the northeastern part of the city.

== Demographics ==
Historical population
Census	Pop.	Note	%±
1860	160		—
1870	216		35.0%
1880	252		16.7%
1890	242		−4.0%
1900	286		18.2%
1910	292		2.1%
1920	361		23.6%
1930	380		5.3%
1940	364		−4.2%
1950	377		3.6%
1960	585		55.2%
1970	8,502		1,353.3%
1980	21,818		156.6%
1990	34,598		58.6%
2000	45,527		31.6%
2010	49,084		7.8%
2020	56,374		14.9%
2024 (est.)	55,272		−2.0%
U.S. Decennial Census; 2020 Census

Apple Valley is in Minnesota's 2nd congressional district, represented by Angie Craig, a Democrat. Apple Valley is represented in the Minnesota Legislature by State Senator Greg Clausen (Democrat, District 57), Representative Robert Bierman (Democrat, District 57A), and Representative John Huot (Democrat, District 57B).

=== 2020 census ===
As of the 2020 census, Apple Valley had a population of 56,374. The median age was 39.4 years. 24.0% of residents were under the age of 18 and 16.6% of residents were 65 years of age or older. For every 100 females there were 92.0 males, and for every 100 females age 18 and over there were 88.9 males age 18 and over.

100.0% of residents lived in urban areas, while 0.0% lived in rural areas.

There were 21,464 households in Apple Valley, of which 32.7% had children under the age of 18 living in them. Of all households, 53.6% were married-couple households, 14.3% were households with a male householder and no spouse or partner present, and 26.0% were households with a female householder and no spouse or partner present. About 25.0% of all households were made up of individuals and 9.8% had someone living alone who was 65 years of age or older.

There were 22,253 housing units, of which 3.5% were vacant. The homeowner vacancy rate was 0.5% and the rental vacancy rate was 7.0%.

Racial composition as of the 2020 census
Race	Number	Percent
White	40,569	72.0%
Black or African American	5,030	8.9%
American Indian and Alaska Native	277	0.5%
Asian	3,796	6.7%
Native Hawaiian and Other Pacific Islander	14	0.0%
Some other race	2,370	4.2%
Two or more races	4,318	7.7%
Hispanic or Latino (of any race)	4,576	8.1%

=== 2010 census ===
As of the census of 2010, there were 49,084 people, 18,875 households, and 13,382 families living in the city. The population density was 2,911.3 inhabitants per square mile (1,124.1/km^{2}). There were 19,600 housing units at an average density of 1,162.5 per square mile (448.8/km^{2}). The racial makeup of the city was 83.8% White, 5.5% African American, 0.4% Native American, 5.3% Asian, 0.1% Pacific Islander, 2.0% from other races, and 3.0% from two or more races. Hispanic or Latino of any race were 4.9% of the population.

There were 18,875 households, of which 35.2% had children under the age of 18 living with them, 56.7% were married couples living together, 10.2% had a female householder with no husband present, 4.0% had a male householder with no wife present, and 29.1% were non-families. Of all households, 23.6% were made up of individuals, and 6.4% had someone living alone who was 65 years of age or older. The average household size was 2.58 and the average family size was 3.07.

The median age in the city was 37.9 years. 25.4% of residents were under the age of 18; 7.3% were between the ages of 18 and 24; 27.5% were from 25 to 44; 30.2% were from 45 to 64; and 9.6% were 65 years of age or older. The gender makeup of the city was 48.5% male and 51.5% female.

=== 2000 census ===
As of the census of 2000, there were 45,527 people, 16,344 households, and 12,405 families living in the city. The population density was 2,625.5 inhabitants per square mile (1,013.7/km^{2}). There were 16,536 housing units at an average density of 953.6 per square mile (368.2/km^{2}). The racial makeup of the city was 91.81% White, 1.91% African American, 0.29% Native American, 3.39% Asian, 0.04% Pacific Islander, 0.88% from other races, and 1.69% from two or more races. Hispanic or Latino of any race were 2.00% of the population.

There were 16,344 households, out of which 42.5% had children under the age of 18 living with them, 63.7% were married couples living together, 9.0% had a female householder with no husband present, and 24.1% were non-families. Of all households, 19.3% were made up of individuals, and 4.0% had someone living alone who was 65 years of age or older. The average household size was 2.77 and the average family size was 3.21.

In the city, the population was spread out, with 29.7% under the age of 18, 7.2% from 18 to 24, 33.1% from 25 to 44, 24.4% from 45 to 64, and 5.5% who were 65 years of age or older. The median age was 34 years. For every 100 females, there were 95.6 males. For every 100 females age 18 and over, there were 92.4 males. For several years, the city's population was among the fastest growing in Minnesota, but it has virtually exhausted the amount of additional buildable land within city limits, and so its growth has slowed considerably since 1990.

The median income for a household in the city was $69,752, and the median income for a family was $79,335 (these figures had risen to $76,789 and $86,874 respectively as of a 2007 estimate). Males had a median income of $50,636 versus $33,315 for females. The per capita income for the city was $29,477. About 1.1% of families and 2.1% of the population were below the poverty line, including 2.0% of those under age 18 and 3.8% of those age 65 or over.

== Politics ==
Presidential election results

2020 Precinct Results Spreadsheet2016 Precinct Results Spreadsheet2012 Precinct Results Spreadsheet2008 Precinct Results Spreadsheet2004 Precinct Results Spreadsheet2000 Precinct Results Spreadsheet1996 Precinct Results1992 Precinct Results1988 Precinct Results1984 Precinct Results1980 Precinct Results1976 Precinct Results1968 Precinct Results1964 Precinct Results1960 Precinct Results
Year	Republican	Democratic	Third parties
2020	37.8% 12,772	59.7% 20,178	2.5% 824
2016	40.2% 11,924	50.6% 15,019	9.2% 2,718
2012	46.6% 13,798	51.4% 15,233	2.0% 593
2008	46.4% 13,560	51.9% 15,159	1.7% 491
2004	51.8% 14,994	47.2% 13,669	1.0% 275
2000	49.7% 12,387	44.7% 11,155	5.6% 1,389
1996	40.8% 8,255	48.4% 9,805	10.8% 2,182
1992	37.1% 7,488	36.5% 7,360	26.4% 5,344
1988	57.4% 8,875	42.6% 6,580	0.0% 0
1984	62.0% 7,550	38.0% 4,622	0.0% 0
1980	49.9% 5,104	38.0% 3,890	12.1% 1,245
1976	52.9% 3,913	44.9% 3,321	2.2% 157

== Economy ==
=== Top employers ===
According to Apple Valley's 2016 Comprehensive Annual Financial Report, the top employers in the city are:

#	Employer	# of Employees
1	Independent School District 196	1,414
2	Target Corporation	520
3	Uponor	400
4	Dakota County	384
5	Walmart	350
6	Augustana Care	265
7	Menards	250
8	Wings Financial Federal Credit Union	225
9	Minnesota Zoo	220
10	Apple Valley Medical Clinic	200

== Arts and culture ==
=== Annual cultural events ===
Apple Valley hosts an annual July 4 festival called "Apple Valley Freedom Days". Festivities include one of the area's largest parades that features local marching bands, service organizations, and many local businesses. There is also a carnival and a fireworks display during the event.

In February, the city hosts the Apple Valley Winter Carnival. Events include ice skating, a medallion hunt, contests and children events.

=== The Minnesota Zoo ===
Apple Valley is home to the Minnesota Zoo, a nationally recognized zoological garden that houses hundreds of animals from several distinct climatological zones. Collections include an indoor Tropics Trail featuring animals from the worlds rain forests and tropical habitats, the Minnesota Trail with native animals from Minnesota including black bears, wolves, and beavers. The Northern Trail features large animals from the worlds cold climates. Highlights of this trail are Asian wild horses, and Takins from China, as well as animals from remote east coast including brown bears, amur leopards, and sea otters. The zoo also features an aquarium, African penguins and Japanese snow monkeys.

== Education ==
There are six elementary, three middle and three high schools in the city, all operated by Independent School District 196. In addition to the two comprehensive high schools, Apple Valley is home to a magnet school open to 11th and 12th graders, the School of Environmental Studies (SES). In fall 2007, Independent School District 196 opened three elementary-level magnet schools: Cedar Park Elementary, which will become a Science, Technology, Engineering and Math (STEM) magnet; Diamond Path Elementary, which will have an International Studies theme, and Glacier Hills Elementary, with an Arts and Science theme. In 2017, Independent School District 196 opened a new Elementary school in neighboring Lakeville, Minnesota. Some students attend public schools in other school districts chosen by their families under Minnesota's open enrollment statute.

== Infrastructure ==
=== Transportation ===
Interstate Highway 35E, Cedar Avenue, and County Road 42 are three of the main routes in Apple Valley. Highway 77 briefly enters the northern part of Apple Valley and becomes County Road 23 / Cedar Avenue.

Minnesota Valley Transit Authority operates many weekday commuter buses to and from Downtown Minneapolis and Saint Paul. The recently built Red Line operates as a dedicated bus line with service to and from the Mall of America.

The Dan Patch line runs just west of Apple Valley.

== Notable people ==
- Arden Cho, actress, singer, and model; attended high school in Apple Valley
- Brianna Brown, actor
- David Fischer, former American ice hockey defenseman drafted by the Montreal Canadiens
- Mark Hall, folkstyle and freestyle wrestler, NCAA Wrestling Champion, attended Apple Valley High School
- John Harvatine IV, co-owner of Stoopid Buddy Stoodios and creator of the TV show Crossing Swords
- Erik Jensen, American actor, playwright, screenwriter and director
- Tyus Jones, point guard for the NBA Memphis Grizzlies and the Duke Blue Devils
- Tre Jones, point guard for the San Antonio Spurs
- Vincent Kartheiser, actor, attended Apple Valley High School
- Derek Rackley, former professional football player
- Carolyn Jane Rodriguez, Minnesota legislator
- Coleen Rowley, former FBI agent and 9/11 whistleblower who was named Time magazine's "Person of the Year" in 2002
- Nicholas Sadler, actor
- Dan Sexton, former ice hockey forward for the Anaheim Ducks
- Gable Steveson, Olympic gold medalist in freestyle wrestling (2020 Tokyo)
- Maria Thayer, actress
- Gary Trent Jr., Shooting guard for the Milwaukee Bucks NBA team
- Lindsey Vonn (née Kildow), Olympic skier
- Darril Wegscheid, Minnesota state senator
