= Bob Hamilton (disambiguation) =

Bob Hamilton (1916–1990) was an American golfer.

Bob Hamilton may also refer to:

- Bob "Bones" Hamilton (1912–1996), American football player
- Bob Hamilton (basketball, born 1941), American former college basketball coach
- Bob Hamilton (died 2008), the model for Norman Rockwell's painting We, Too, Have a Job to Do

== See also ==
- Robert Hamilton (disambiguation)
