= John Hamilton, 1st Lord Belhaven and Stenton =

John Hamilton, 1st Lord Belhaven and Stenton (died 17 June 1679), known as Sir John Hamilton, 2nd Baronet from circa 1645 to 1647, was a Scottish peer.

Hamilton was the son of Sir James Hamilton, 1st Baronet, and his wife Margaret (née Hamilton). This branch of the Hamilton family descended from John Hamilton (d. c. 1550), illegitimate (but later legitimised) son of James Hamilton, 1st Lord Hamilton, and half-brother of James Hamilton, 1st Earl of Arran (from whom the Dukes of Hamilton descend). He succeeded his father in the baronetcy in circa 1645 and in 1647 he was raised to the Peerage of Scotland as Lord Belhaven and Stenton, of the County of Haddington, with remainder to heirs male. The following year he was a member of the Scottish army in England that unsuccessfully attempted to rescue Charles I, and managed to escape from the Battle of Preston. In 1675 Hamilton surrendered his lordship to the Crown and received a new patent with remainder to his kinsman John Hamilton of Pressmannan, the husband of his granddaughter Margaret, and in failure of that line to his heirs whatsoever.

Lord Belhaven and Stenton married Margaret, daughter of James Hamilton, 2nd Marquess of Hamilton. He died in June 1679, without surviving male issue, when the baronetcy became extinct. He was succeeded in the lordship according to the special remainder by the aforementioned John Hamilton of Pressmannan.

Peerage of Scotland
New creation	Lord Belhaven and Stenton; 1647/1675–1679	Succeeded by John Hamilton
Baronetage of Nova Scotia
Preceded by James Hamilton	Baronet (of Broomhill) c. 1645–1679	Extinct
