= Edward Denison (bishop) =

English bishop (1801–1854)

The Right Reverend Edward Denison
- Bishop of Salisbury
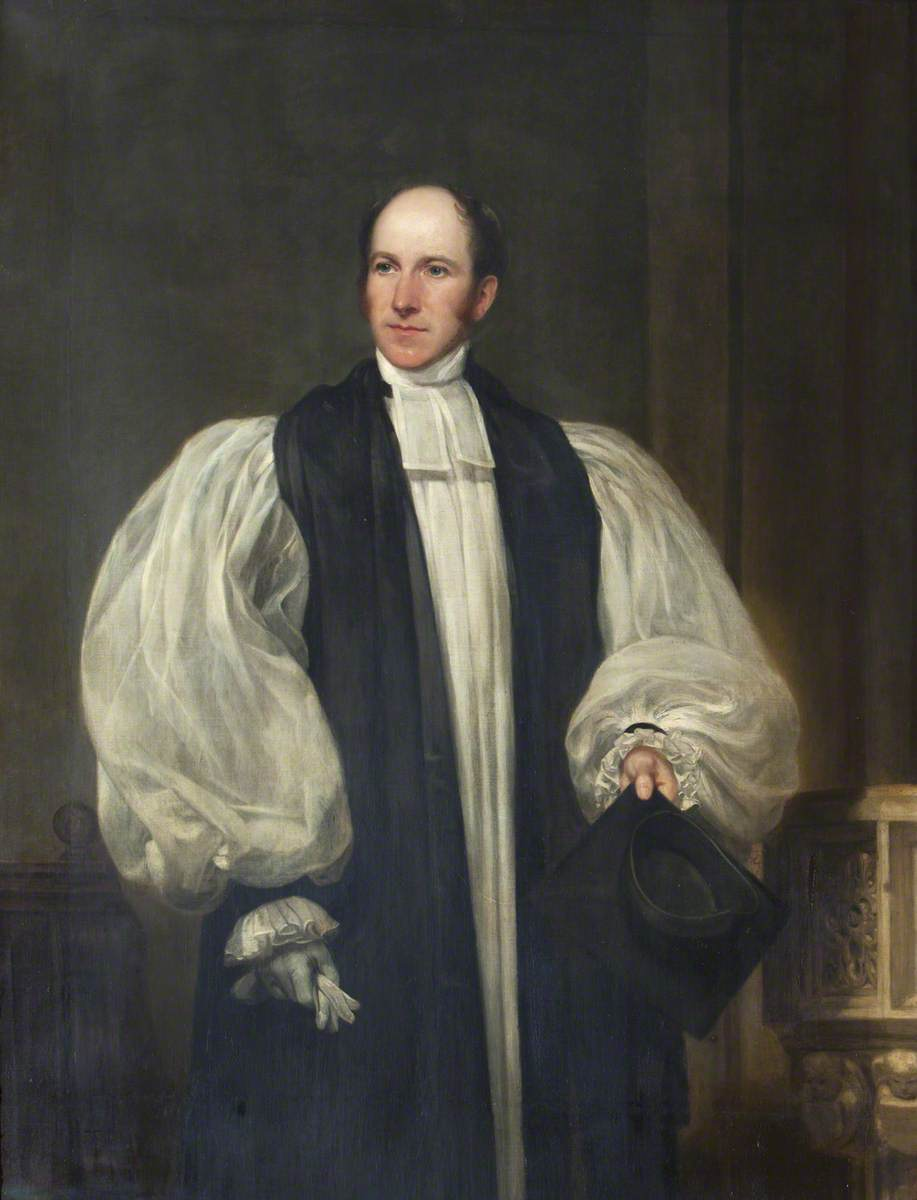
- Church: Church of England
- Diocese: Diocese of Salisbury
- Installed: 1837
- Predecessor: Thomas Burgess
- Successor: Walter Kerr Hamilton

Orders
- Ordination: 23 December 1827.

Personal details
- Born: 13 March 1801 Odiham
- Died: 6 March 1854 (aged 52)
- Denomination: Anglican
- Spouse: Louisa Mary Seymer
- Education: Eton College
- Alma mater: Oriel College, Oxford; Merton College, Oxford

Edward Denison the elder (1801–1854) was an English bishop of Salisbury.

== Life ==
He was born at 34 Harley Street, London, on 13 March 1801. His father was John Denison of Ossington, a merchant in London, whose surname was originally Wilkinson, but as first cousin of William Denison of Kirkgate, Leeds, he was left the bulk of a large property on condition that he assumed the name of Denison and continued the business in Leeds. His father did this, and afterwards resided at Ossington, Nottinghamshire, before dying at 2 Portman Square, London, on 6 May 1820. His mother, his father's second wife, was Charlotte, second daughter of Samuel Estwick, M.P. for Westbury. John Evelyn Denison, speaker of the House of Commons, George Anthony Denison the archdeacon of Taunton, and Sir William Thomas Denison were his brothers.

Edward Denison received his early education at Esher, and in 1811 entered Eton College. In 1818 he entered Oriel College, Oxford, where in 1822 he took a first class and his B. A. degree. He was elected a fellow of Merton College in 1826, proceeded M.A., and received ordination on 23 December 1827. After serving as curate at Wolvercote, near Oxford, and at Radcliffe on Trent in Nottinghamshire, he returned to Oxford and took charge of the parish of St. Peter, where he remained until his appointment to the see of Salisbury.

He acquired some reputation while filling the office of select preacher before the university in 1834, but in 1835 strongly opposed the admission of dissenters to the colleges of Oxford. With the support of Lord Melbourne, and at the early age of thirty-six, he was consecrated bishop of Salisbury (16 April 1837), having on 5 April previously been created D.D. by his university. He immediately increased the number of Sunday services in the parish churches, and reformed the mode of conducting confirmations. When cholera broke out in Salisbury the bishop worked both as a religious teacher and as a sanitary reformer.

He was a well-known advocate of the revival of the church's synodical powers, and in convocation displayed considerable resolution in furthering the movement. A good administrator, in his theological views he was always somewhat intolerant. He died from the effects of a cold, which terminated in a black jaundice, in the Close, Salisbury, on 6 March 1854, aged fifty-three, and was buried in the cloisters of the cathedral on 15 March.

== Works ==
Denison wrote mainly sermons and charges. They include:

- 'The Sin of Causing Offence,' a sermon, 1835.
- 'A Review of the State of the Question respecting the Admission of Dissenters to the Universities,' 1835.
- 'Sermons preached before the University of Oxford,' 1836.
- 'The Church the Teacher of her Children,' a sermon, 1839.
- 'The Obligation of the Clergy in Preaching the Word of God,' a charge, 1842.
- 'Difficulties in the Church,' a sermon, 1853.
- 'Speech in the House of Lords, June 25, 1853, relative to the Charge of having received more than the legitimate Income of his See,' 1853.

== Family ==
On 27 June 1839 Denison married Louisa Mary (b. 1812), daughter of Henry Ker Seymer of Hanford, Dorset, who died on 22 September 1841. It was of this first marriage that Edward Denison (1840–1870) was born. He married secondly, on 10 July 1845, Clementina (b. 1812), daughter of Charles Baillie-Hamilton, archdeacon of Cleveland, who died on 12 May 1894.

Church of England titles
Preceded by Thomas Burgess	Bishop of Salisbury; 1837–1854	Succeeded by Walter Kerr Hamilton
