= Margaret Hamilton, Lady Belhaven and Stenton =

English Royalist conspirator and medical practitioner (bef.1625 – c.1695)

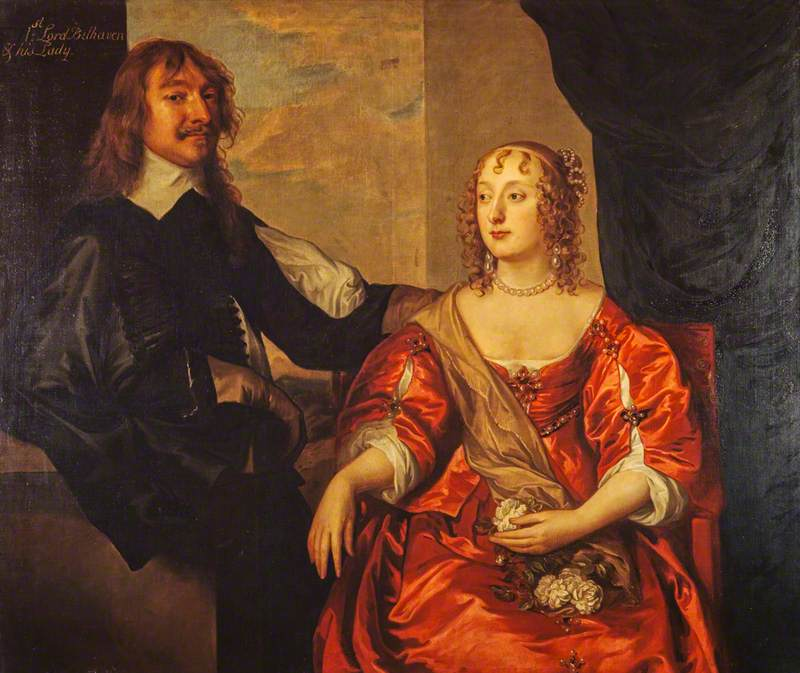
- Hamilton and her husband, by Anthony van Dyck
- Born: Bef. 1625
- Died: c. 1695
- Noble family: James Hamilton, 1st Duke of Hamilton (half-brother)
- Spouse: John Hamilton, 1st Lord Belhaven and Stenton
- Father: James Hamilton, 2nd Marquess of Hamilton

Margaret Hamilton, Lady Belhaven and Stenton (bef. 1625 – c. 1695) was a Scottish noblewoman known for her part in faking her husband's death and her knowledge of herbal remedies and medical practice.

== Family ==
Margaret was born before 1625 and was the illegitimate daughter of James Hamilton, 2nd Marquess of Hamilton. It has been suggested that her mother was Anne Stewart, the widowed daughter of Walter Stewart, 1st Lord Blantyre.

She married her distant relative John Hamilton, who was created 1st Lord Belhaven and Stenton by Charles I of England in 1647. They had three daughters – Anne, Margaret, and Elizabeth – and a son, who died in childhood in 1661.

== Faking John's death ==
During the Wars of the Three Kingdoms, in 1648, the Hamiltons feared that John might be arrested because he had financially supported Lady Margaret's half-brother, James Hamilton, 1st Duke of Hamilton, who had led a Royalist army into England and been executed by the Parliamentarians. Margaret and John arranged for John to fake his death, pretending that he had drowned in the Solway Firth. Lady Margaret went into public mourning, and John's death was recorded by the Lyon King of Arms in 1652. He returned after six years in hiding, was admitted as a member of the Privy Council in 1663 and actually died in 1679.

== Medical practitioner ==
Lady Margaret's correspondence demonstrates that she was a sought-after nurse and practitioner of herbal remedies. She collected recipes and made up her own plasters, and advised her great-niece, Margaret Hamilton, Countess of Panmure, in maintaining a healthy pregnancy.

== Death and legacy ==
Lady Margaret died in or after 1694, predeceased by two of her children. The line continued through her daughter Anne, who married Sir Robert Hamilton, 1st Baronet of Silvertonhill. Their daughter Margaret married Sir Samuel Baillie. Their daughter Elizabeth married Alexander Seton, 1st Viscount Kingston, as his third wife.

Lady Margaret was sketched and painted several times by the studio of Anthony van Dyck.
