= Wishaw House =

Coordinates: 55.7874°N 3.9357°W

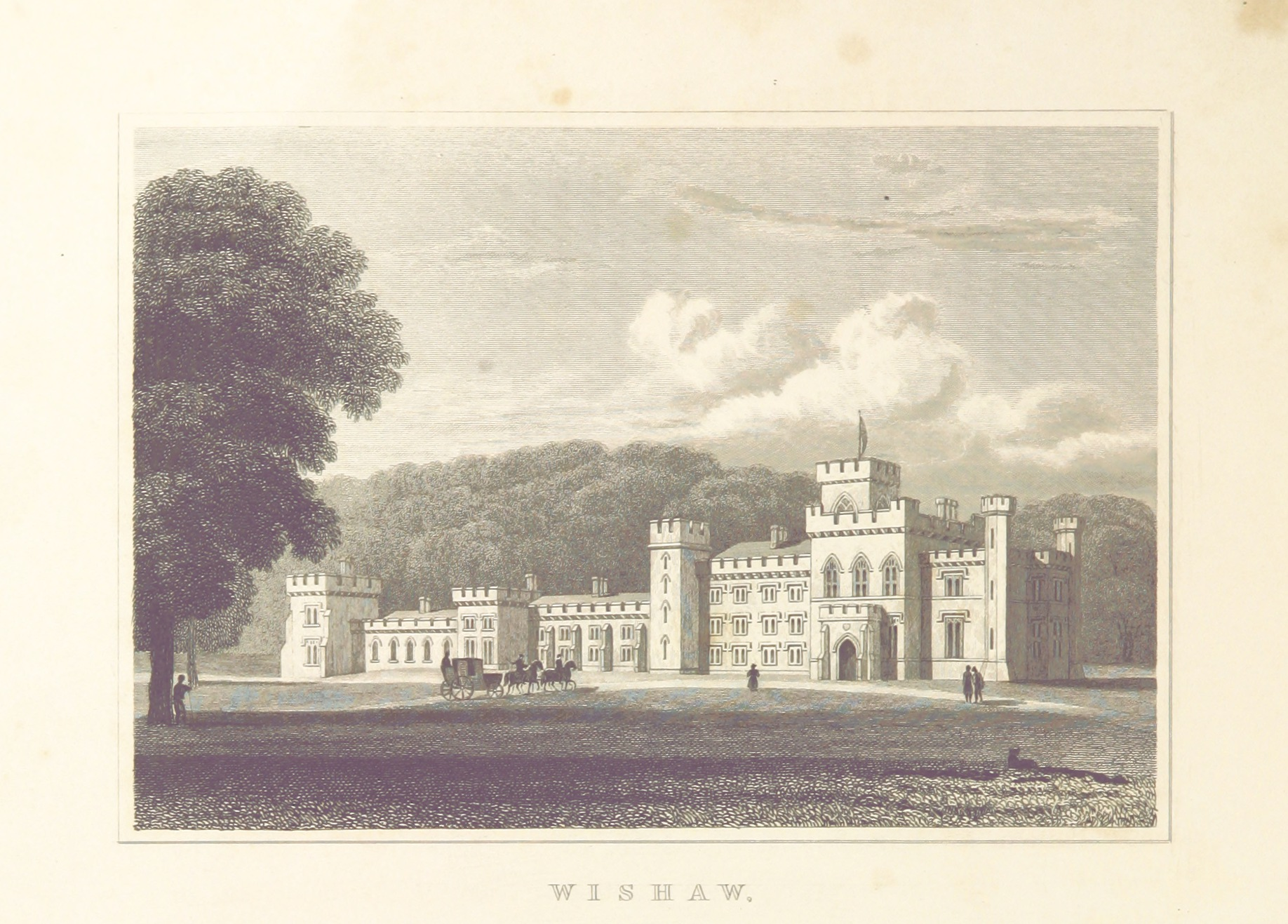
- An illustration of the house, 1831
- Interactive map of the Wishaw House area

General information
- Status: Demolished
- Type: Mansion
- Architectural style: Scots Baronial
- Location: Wishaw, Scotland
- Construction started: 1665
- Demolished: 1957
- Owner: Lord Belhaven and Stenton

Wishaw House was a large mansion located in Wishaw, Scotland. Once the family seat of the Belhavens and Hamilton family, the mansion was abandoned by the 20th century and was demolished, now nothing more than a ruin in the woodland by the South Calder Water.

== History ==
Historically located in the parish of Cambusnethan, the land which the house would sit on was purchased by Lord Belhaven at some point after the year 1405, however the house would not be constructed until 1665. It was on the site of earlier farmsteads, in the dense woodland that once covered the town of Wishaw. Although the house itself is from the 1600s, analysis shows it actually was built from farmhouses and barns, that were at least a century older. Peel towers also existed in the vicinity. It is said that the house was originally gifted by Charles I to nobles, but eventually it fell to the Hamiltons of Wishaw.

The earlier farmstead of the house is named as Wisha on Timothy Pont's 16th century map of Scotland.

Throughout its history, the House went through many renovations and extensions, the most distinct being that of James Gillespie Graham, who expanded the house in 1825 in the Scottish baronial style, while also destroying some of the more older parts of the house. Graham also designed Cambusnethan House, another mansion in the parish which survives to this day, although abandoned.

It is likely that the town of Wishaw itself was named after the house, as the town was only renamed Wishaw in the 1700s. Frédéric Chopin, in 1848 visited and played here during his travels in the United Kingdom.

== Decline ==
After the death of the 8th Lord of Belhaven, in 1868 without a male heir the house passed onto his kinsmen, likely a contributing factor in the mansion's decline. Little is known about the ownership or state of the mansion from this point on, but in November 1951, it was considered too much of a burden to own, and was put up for auction. It was purchased by Glasgow businessman Samuel B. Allison for only £3,550 (£114,000 adjusted for inflation). Allison could not find a suitable buyer or use for the property in the economic conditions of post-war Britain, and marked the property for destruction. The destruction was complete in 1957, however some parts of the house still remain intact as an abandoned ruin in the near the Calder.
