= Farquhar Peak =

Mountain in Minnesota, United States

Coordinates: 47°52′38.5″N 89°55′15.5″W

Farquhar Peak is a summit in Cook County, Minnesota, in the United States. With an elevation of 1,250 feet (380 m), Farquhar Peak is the 70th highest summit in the state of Minnesota. Farquhar Peak was named for a government surveyor.
