= A Treasury of Foolishly Forgotten Americans =

A Treasury of Foolishly Forgotten Americans: Pirates, Skinflints, Patriots and Other Colorful Characters Stuck in the Footnotes of History
- Foolishly Forgotten Americans Cover
- Author: Michael Farquhar
- Cover artist: cover design by Rosanne J. Serra / cover illustration by Peter de Seve
- Language: English
- Genre: History/Humor
- Publisher: Penguin Group (USA) Inc.
- Publication date: 25 Mar 2008
- Publication place: United States
- Media type: Print ( Paperback) & Electronic
- Pages: 272 pp (paperback edition)
- ISBN: 978-0-14-311305-8 (paperback edition)
- OCLC: 230174177
- Preceded by: The Century History as it Happened on the Front Page of the Capital's Newspaper
- Followed by: Behind the Palace Doors: Five Centuries of Sex, Adventure, Vice, Trearchery, and Folly from Royal Britain

A Treasury of Foolishly Forgotten Americans is a compilation of biographies by Michael Farquhar. This was Farquhar's fifth book in a series of humorous historical outlooks.

== Cast of characters ==
John Billington: Mayflower Murderer
Mary Dyer: Quaker Martyr
Anne Bonny: Pirate of the Caribbean
Tom Quick: “The Indian Slayer”
Mary Jemison: “The White Woman of the Genesee”
William Dawes: The Other Midnight Rider
James T. Callender: Muckraker for the First Amendment
John Ledyard: The Explorer Who Dreamed of Walking the World
Elizabeth Patterson Bonaparte: Royal American
Stephen Pleasonton: The Clerk Who Saved the Constitution (and the Declaration of Independence, Too)
Richard Mentor Johnson: The Veep Who Killed Tecumseh
Zilpha Elaw: An Unlikely Evangelist
Edwin Forrest: American Idol
Rose O’Neale Greenhow: A Spy of Grande Dame Proportion Rose O'Neal Greenhow
Clement Vallandigham: Copperhead
Mary Surratt: The Mother of Conspirators?
Tunis Campbell: Pillar of Reconstruction
Sarah Winnemucca: “Paiute Princess”
Alexander “Boss” Shepherd: The Man Who Made Washington “Worthy of the Nation” Alexander Robey Shepherd
Isaac C. Parker: “The Hanging Judge”
Hetty Green: “The Witch of Wall Street”
Oliver Curtis Perry: Outlaw of the East
Anna Jarvis: The Mother of Mother’s Day
William J. Burns: “America’s Sherlock Holmes”
Gaston B. Means: American Scoundrel Gaston Means
Louise Arner Boyd: The Socialite Who Conquered the Arctic Wilderness
Beulah Louise Henry: “Lady Edison”
Guy Gabaldon: “The Pied Piper of Saipan”
Elizabeth Bentley: “Red Spy Queen”
Dick Fosbury: Father of the Flop
