= Farquahr =

Farquahr was an American folk band from Branford, Connecticut. Playing often-humorous folk music, the group enjoyed regional popularity in New England in the late 1960s and early 1970s.

Farquahr's members all took pseudonymous stage names, three of them were actually brothers. All sang and played guitar. They were previously known as The McGowan Brothers, playing folk and Celtic music. They released two albums under the Farquahr designation, the first as Fabulous Farquahr and the latter under the shortened designation. Jerry Ragovoy produced their sophomore effort, which was released in 1970 and reached #195 on the Billboard 200 in December of that year. They also toured with the 1968 McGovern campaign.

== Members ==
- Bobby McGowan (Hummingbird Farquahr)
- Dennis McGowan (Condor Farquahr)
- Frank McGowan (Flamingo Farquahr)
- Doug Lapham (Barnswallow Farquahr)
- Jim Ricker (Buzzard Farquahr) (joined the group when Doug Lapham left)
- Jack Huber (Mary Farquahr) bass player with McGowans, and then with Fabulous Farquahr until his death in 1968

== Discography ==
- The Fabulous Farquahr (Verve Records, 1968)
- Farquahr (Elektra Records, 1970)
- The Third Album (Warpt Records, 1982)
