= Farquar Lake =

Lake in the state of Minnesota, United States

- Location within Minnesota
- Location: Dakota County, Minnesota
- Coordinates: 44°45′30″N 93°9′52″W
- Type: lake

Farquar Lake is a 67-acre lake in Apple Valley, Dakota County, in the U.S. state of Minnesota. It has a maximum depth of 10 ft (3 m).

The lake is used as a stormwater pond for the city of Apple Valley. Its water quality is poor. Common fish species present include black bullhead, bluegill, and walleye.

It was most likely named for John Farquhar, a pioneer settler, although it may have been named for James Farquhar, whose name appears on the abstract of land entries in 1874 as the owner of property adjacent to it.

== See also ==
- List of lakes in Minnesota
