= Robert Udny-Hamilton, 11th Lord Belhaven and Stenton =

Scottish representative peer and soldier

Lieutenant-Colonel Robert Edward Archibald Udny-Hamilton, 11th Lord Belhaven and Stenton, CIE, DL (8 April 1871 – 26 October 1950) was a Scottish representative peer and a soldier.

On 15 November 1898, he married Kathleen Gonville Bromhead and they had two children:

- Julia Somerset, Lady Raglan (1901–1971), married the 4th Baron Raglan and had issue, including FitzRoy Somerset, 5th Baron Raglan and Geoffrey Somerset, 6th Baron Raglan.
- Robert Alexander Benjamin Hamilton, 12th Lord Belhaven and Stenton (1903–1961) married (1) Heather Mildred Carmichael Bell and had issue and (2) Cyrilla Mary Binns, Lady Belhaven and Stenton and had issue.

Kathleen died on 1 December 1935 at their home, Udny Castle, and Lord Belhaven married Sheila de Hauteville Pearson on 25 March 1938. They had two children:

- Hon. Margaret de Hauteville Hamilton (b. 3 July 1939), wife of Keith Schellenberg.
- Dr. Hon. Victoria Edith Hamilton (b. 17 April 1941).

Belhaven rose to the rank of Lieutenant-Colonel in the service of the Indian Army and fought in the Chitral expedition in 1895, the Tirah Campaign from 1897 to 1898 and the Mesopotamia campaign from 1915 to 1918, where he was mentioned in dispatches.

In 1920, he succeeded his uncle (whose son Ralph, Master of Belhaven, had been killed during the defence of Amiens, 31 March 1918) as Lord Belhaven and Stenton. He was baptised as Robert Edward Archibald Hamilton but, in 1934, he legally changed his name to Robert Edward Archibald Udny-Hamilton.

After suffering ill-health for two years, Udny-Hamilton died at his home, Udny Castle, on 26 October 1950.

Masonic offices
Preceded by Alexander Archibald Hagart-Speirs	Grand Master of the Grand Lodge of Scotland; 1931–1933	Succeeded by The Lord Saltoun
Peerage of Scotland
Preceded by Alexander Hamilton	Lord Belhaven and Stenton; 1920–1950	Succeeded by Robert Hamilton
