= Lord Lieutenant of Lanarkshire =

Ceremonial officer in Lanarkshire, Scotland

This is a list of people who served as Lord Lieutenant of Lanarkshire.

- George Douglas-Hamilton, 1st Earl of Orkney 1714 - 29 January 1737
- Douglas Douglas-Hamilton, 8th Duke of Hamilton 17 March 1794 – 2 August 1799
- Archibald Douglas-Hamilton, 9th Duke of Hamilton 30 November 1799 – 1802
- Alexander Douglas-Hamilton, 10th Duke of Hamilton 1 November 1802 – 18 August 1852
- William Douglas-Hamilton, 11th Duke of Hamilton 1 October 1852 – 15 July 1863
- Robert Hamilton, 8th Lord Belhaven and Stenton 6 August 1863 – 22 December 1868
- Sir Thomas Colebrooke, 4th Baronet 27 January 1869 – 11 January 1890
- Charles Douglas-Home, 12th Earl of Home 1 February 1890 – 1915
- James Hozier, 2nd Baron Newlands 14 October 1915 – 1921
- Sir Robert King Stewart 18 April 1921 – 20 December 1930
- Sir James Knox 21 March 1931 – 8 May 1938
- Gavin Hamilton, 2nd Baron Hamilton of Dalzell 6 July 1938 – 23 June 1952
- John Colville, 1st Baron Clydesmuir 26 August 1952 – 31 October 1954
- Sir Alexander Stephen 28 January 1955 – 1959
- John Christie Stewart 16 June 1959 – 1963
- Ronald Colville, 2nd Baron Clydesmuir 21 August 1963 – 1992
- Hutchison Burt Sneddon 17 August 1992 – 1999
- vacant
- Gilbert Kirkwood Cox 1 February 2001 – 2010
- Mushtaq Ahmad 11 November 2010 – 12 November 2017
- Susan, Baroness Haughey 13 November 2017 – present

== Deputy lieutenants ==
A deputy lieutenant of Lanarkshire is commissioned by the Lord Lieutenant of Lanarkshire. Deputy lieutenants support the work of the lord-lieutenant. There can be several deputy lieutenants at any time, depending on the population of the county. Their appointment does not terminate with the changing of the lord-lieutenant, but they usually retire at age 75.

- 18 August 2016: Gavin Whitefield
- 2 November 2018: Davy Russell
- 20 June 2025: Laura-Ann Currie
