= Robert Hamilton, 12th Lord Belhaven and Stenton =

Scottish peer and author (1903–1961)

Robert Alexander Benjamin Hamilton, 12th Lord Belhaven and Stenton (16 September 1903 – 10 July 1961), was a Scottish soldier, colonial administrator, author, and peer. He was a Fellow of both the Royal Geographical Society and the Royal Australasian College of Surgeons.

== Life ==
The son of Robert Hamilton-Udny, 11th Lord Belhaven and Stenton, by his marriage to Kathleen Gonville Bromhead, the young Hamilton was baptised Robert Alexander Benjamin. He was educated at Temple Grove School, Eastbourne, then at Eton College, before training for an army career at the Royal Military College, Sandhurst. He was an officer of the Royal Scots Fusiliers between 1924 and 1931, then was seconded to the Aden Protectorate Levies between 1931 and 1934, during which time he commanded the unit's Camel Troop.

Between 1934 and 1946 Belhaven was an administrator in the Colonial Service in the Aden Protectorate, during which time he initiated an archeological excavation at Shabwa in South Yemen, the results of which were described in the Geographical Journal in 1942. Some of the antiquities collected in this exercise were presented to the Ashmolean Museum in 1954, and others were sent to the museum at Aden. He recorded his experiences in the Arabian Peninsula in The Kingdom of Melchior: Adventure in South West Arabia as the Master of Belhaven (London, 1949, John Murray) and in The Uneven Road (London, 1955, John Murray). He also published a historical novel, The Eagle and the Sun (London, 1951, John Murray) as Lord Belhaven about the Legio X Fretensis' unsuccessful campaign in Arabia Felix under Aelius Gallus which ended in Mariba.

He became a Fellow of the Royal Geographical Society and of the Royal Australasian College of Surgeons.

On 20 October 1950 he succeeded to the title of 12th Lord Belhaven and Stenton, and died on 10 July 1961 at the age of 57.

== Family ==
Hamilton's first marriage was to Heather Mildred Carmichael Bell, daughter of Lt.-Col. Richard Carmichael Bell and Mildred Charlotte Davidson-Houston, on 4 February 1926. One child was born of this marriage, Robert Anthony Carmichael Hamilton, on 27 February 1927, who eventually succeeded to the title. On 21 March 1942, after a divorce from his first wife in 1941, he married Cyrilla Mary Binns, daughter of Raymund Louis Binns (late the Yorkshire Regiment, killed in action in 1916) and Maud Cartman. One child was born of this second marriage, Janet Cyrilla Hamilton (19 September 1946 – 16 April 1955).

== Notes ==
Peerage of Scotland
Preceded by Robert Edward Archibald Hamilton-Udny	Lord Belhaven and Stenton; 1950–1961	Succeeded by Robert Anthony Carmichael Hamilton
