= Albemarle Cator =

British Army general

Major-General Albemarle Cator CB DSO
- Born: 12 April 1877
- Died: 18 November 1932 (aged 55)
- Military career
- Allegiance: United Kingdom
- Branch: British Army
- Service years: 1897–1932
- Rank: Major-General
- Commands: London District; Scots Guards
- Conflicts: Second Boer War; First World War
- Awards: Companion of the Order of the Bath; Distinguished Service Order; Mentioned in Despatches

Major-General Albemarle Bertie Edward Cator, CB, DSO (12 April 1877 – 18 November 1932) was a senior British Army officer who served as General Officer Commanding London District and Major-General Commanding the Brigade of Guards. He served in the Second Boer War and commanded the 58th (2/1st London) Division during the First World War.

== Military career ==
Cator was commissioned a second lieutenant in the Scots Guards on 9 June 1897, and was promoted to lieutenant on 17 May 1899.

He served with the 1st battalion of his regiment in South Africa during the Second Boer War, and was present at the battles of Belmont, Modder River, and Magersfontein in 1899. The following year, he took part in the march to Bloemfontein and Pretoria, the battles of Diamond Hill and Belfast, and advance to Komatipoort.

Following the end of the war in late May 1902, Cator returned home with his regiment in the SS Tagus, which arrived in Southampton in July.

Cator later served in the First World War and was promoted to brevet lieutenant colonel in June 1916 and to brevet colonel "for distinguished service in the Field" a year later. He was then promoted to the temporary rank of major general on 6 October 1917 and succeeded Major General Hew Fanshawe as GOC of the 58th (2/1st London) Division, taking part in the Battle of Passchendaele and commanding it for the rest of the war.

He later reverted to his substantive rank of brevet colonel and took command of a brigade, which saw him promoted to temporary brigadier general while so employed, in February 1919. He was promoted to substantive colonel on 2 June 1919.

He became a substantive major general in June 1925 and was Commander of Lucknow District in India in 1927.

He was then being placed on half-pay in May 1931 before becoming Major-General Commanding the Brigade of Guards and GOC London District in February 1932, taking over from Major General Sir Charles Corkran in February 1932.

Cator lived at Trewsbury near Cirencester and died in a hunting accident in November 1932.

== Family ==
Cator's grandfather, John Barwell Cator, inherited the estates of his uncle John Cator, an MP, landowner and property developer.

In 1903 Cator married Violet Eveleen Sutton; they had one son. Following the dissolution of his first marriage, he married Eleanor Gertrude Atherley (née Lumsden) in 1920.

Military offices
Preceded by Hew Fanshawe	GOC 58th (2/1st London) Division; 1916–1918	Succeeded by Nevill Smyth
Preceded by Sir Charles Corkran	GOC London District; April–November 1932	Succeeded by Sir Charles Grant
