= Anthony Hamilton (Archdeacon of Colchester) =

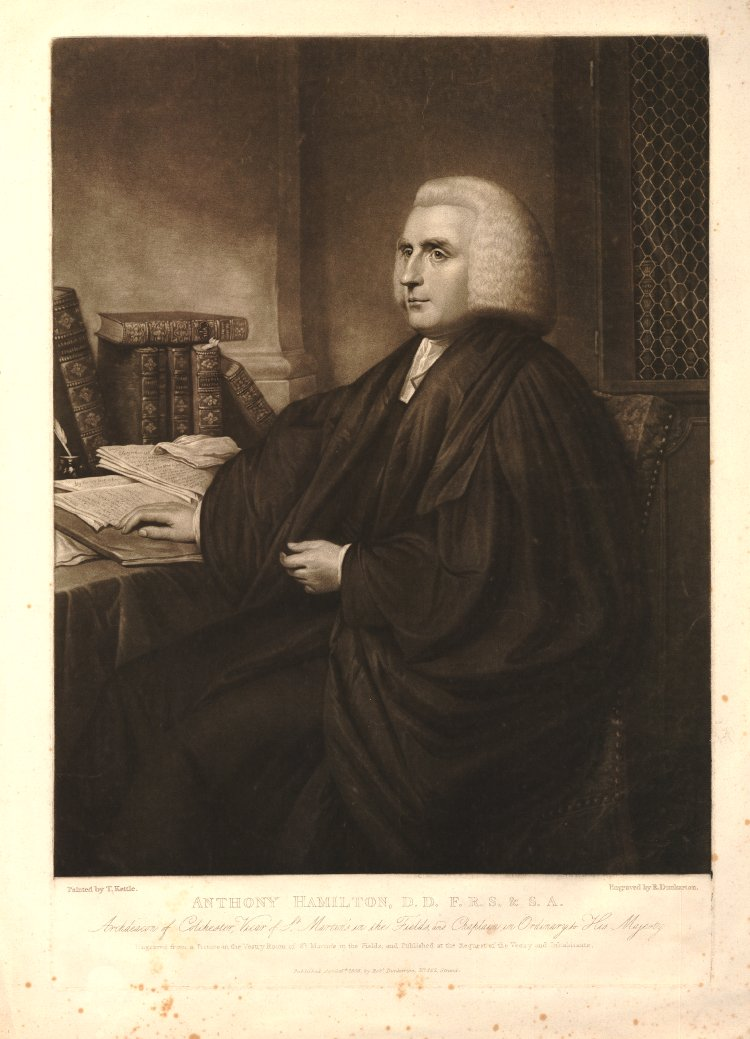
Anthony Hamilton, 1806 engraving

Anthony Hamilton (1739 – 1812) was an Anglican priest, Archdeacon of Colchester from 1775.

== Life ==
Anthony Hamilton was born on 5 May 1739, the youngest son of Alexander Hamilton (born 1693, fifth son of the second marriage of William Hamilton the Scottish antiquarian, who died in 1724) by his second wife Barbara Lilley, who died before Anthony was five. His father was a solicitor at Lincoln's Inn in London, who also developed country interests in Loughton, where he had the remains of Barbara and three of their children transferred and reburied in 1744.

In 1745 Alexander married the heiress Charlotte Stiles, who had inherited the nearby Debden Hall farm and estate (see Debden House) on the death of her father Richard Stiles in 1739, and who in 1747 inherited the Essex manor of Holyfield (Hallifield), in the north-east of the parish of Waltham Holy Cross, which remained in the family into the 19th century. Alex. Hamilton was shown as the owner of Debden Hall on a map of 1777. In his will (written in 1767 with a codicil in 1774) he styled himself as Alexander Hamilton of Lincoln's Inn, Middlesex. He died in 1781, with his will was proved on 2 February.

Anthony Hamilton was his father's youngest son. He was educated at Harrow School and entered Corpus Christi College, Cambridge in 1755. He graduated B.A. there in 1760, M.A. in 1763, and D.D. in 1775.

Ordained deacon in 1762 and priest in 1763, he became vicar of Fulham, and then in 1766 of Orsett in Essex. In 1770, on the death of John Jortin, he became Archdeacon of London, giving up the post in 1775 to become Archdeacon of Colchester. He was elected a Fellow of the Society of Antiquaries of London in 1773, and of the Royal Society in 1777.

In 1776, Hamilton became rector of Much Hadham in Hertfordshire and gave up his Fulham living; he became also vicar of St Martin-in-the-Fields. In the 1790s, he lived on Savile Row, London. He died on 4 October 1812, and was buried at Loughton, with memorials set up in the Much Hadham and Little Hadham churches. His will, written on 12 June 1812, was proved on 20 October.

== Family ==
Hamilton married Anne Terrick on 12 February 1767, the daughter of Richard Terrick the Bishop of London.

The couple had four daughters:

- Charlotte (1767-1855), married William Fitzhugh in 1792. She presented Lawrence's Portrait of Sarah Siddons to the National Gallery in 1843.
- Kitty, married Patrick Maxwell (d. 1803), who led the 19th Dragoons at the Battle of Assaye, where he was killed.
- Anne; unmarried in 1812.
- Fanny; unmarried in 1812.

and four sons:

- Terrick Hamilton (1773-1775), who died young;
- William Richard Hamilton (1777-1859), antiquarian, traveller, and diplomat;
- Anthony Hamilton (1778-1851), Archdeacon of Taunton and the father of Bishop Walter Kerr Hamilton; and
- Terrick Hamilton (1781-1876), diplomat, orientalist, and translator, who translated the Romance of Antar, the collection of poems celebrating Antarah ibn Shaddad.

Hamilton's wife Anne died on 3 September 1782.
