= Robert W. Hamilton (law professor) =

American law professor

Robert W. Hamilton (Mar 4, 1931 – January 12, 2018) was an American legal scholar who was the Minerva House Drysdale Regents Chair in Law at the University of Texas School of Law.

Hamilton earned his bachelor's degree from Swarthmore College in 1952 and obtained a J. D. from the University of Chicago Law School three years later. He served as a law clerk for Tom C. Clark before joining the Washington D. C. law firm Gardner, Morrison & Rogers. In 1964, Hamilton began teaching at the University of Texas School of Law in Austin. The Robert W. Hamilton Book Award was named for him. Over the course of his career, Hamilton was named a member of the American Law Institute and a fellow of the American Bar Foundation. He retired in 2004. His wife Dagmar Hamilton taught at the Lyndon B. Johnson School of Public Affairs.

== See also ==
- List of law clerks for the tenth seat of the Supreme Court of the United States
