= Robert Hamilton, 8th Lord Belhaven and Stenton =

Scottish peer and politician

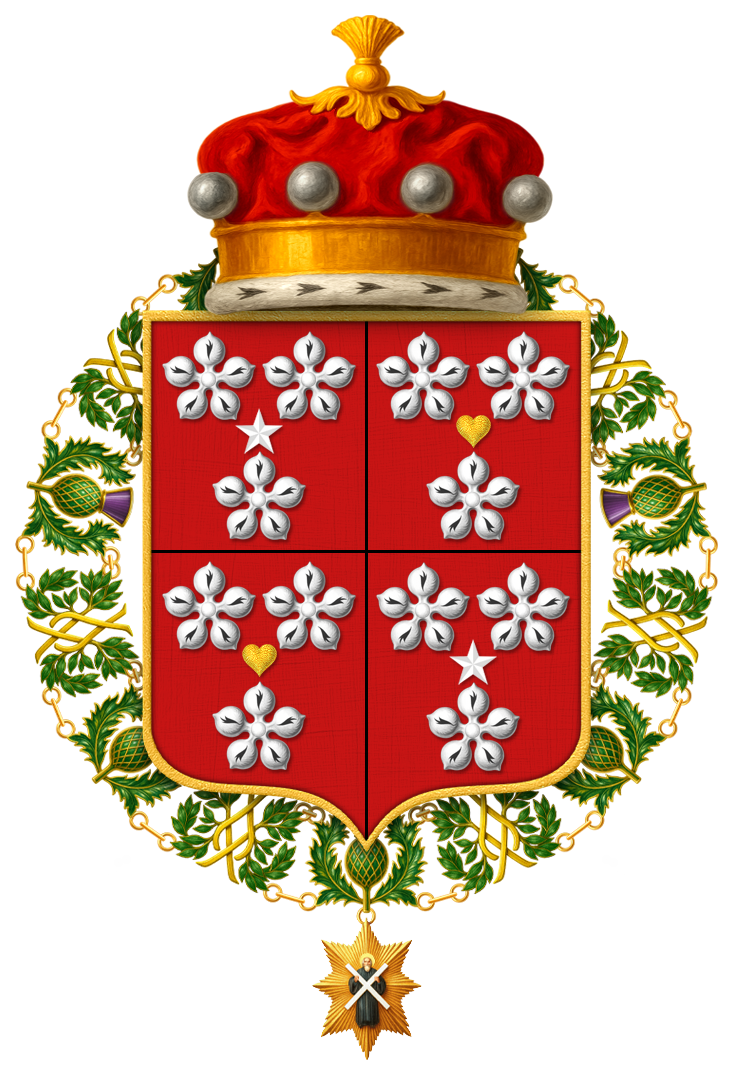
Shield of Arms of Robert Montgomery Hamilton, 1st Baron Hamilton of Wishaw, KT

Robert Montgomery Hamilton, 8th Lord Belhaven and Stenton KT (1793 – 22 December 1868) was a Scottish peer and politician.

== Background ==
Born at Wishaw House, he was the son of William Hamilton, 7th Lord Belhaven and Stenton, and Penelope Macdonald, youngest daughter of Ranald MacDonald of Clanranald. In 1814 he succeeded his father in the Lordship of Belhaven and Stenton.

== Career ==
Hamilton sat on the Whig benches in the House of Lords as a Scottish representative peer between 1819 and 1832. The latter year he was created Baron Hamilton of Wishaw, in the County of Lanark, in the Peerage of the United Kingdom. This title gave him an automatic seat in the House of Lords. Hamilton also served as Lord High Commissioner to the General Assembly of the Church of Scotland from 1831 to 1841, from 1847 to 1851, again from 1853 to 1857 and a last time from 1860 to 1866. Having been previously the county's vice-lord-lieutenant, he was appointed Lord Lieutenant of Lanarkshire in 1863, an office he held until his death five years later. In 1861, Hamilton was invested as a Knight of the Thistle. He is recorded as President of the Wodrow Society in 1845.

== Family ==
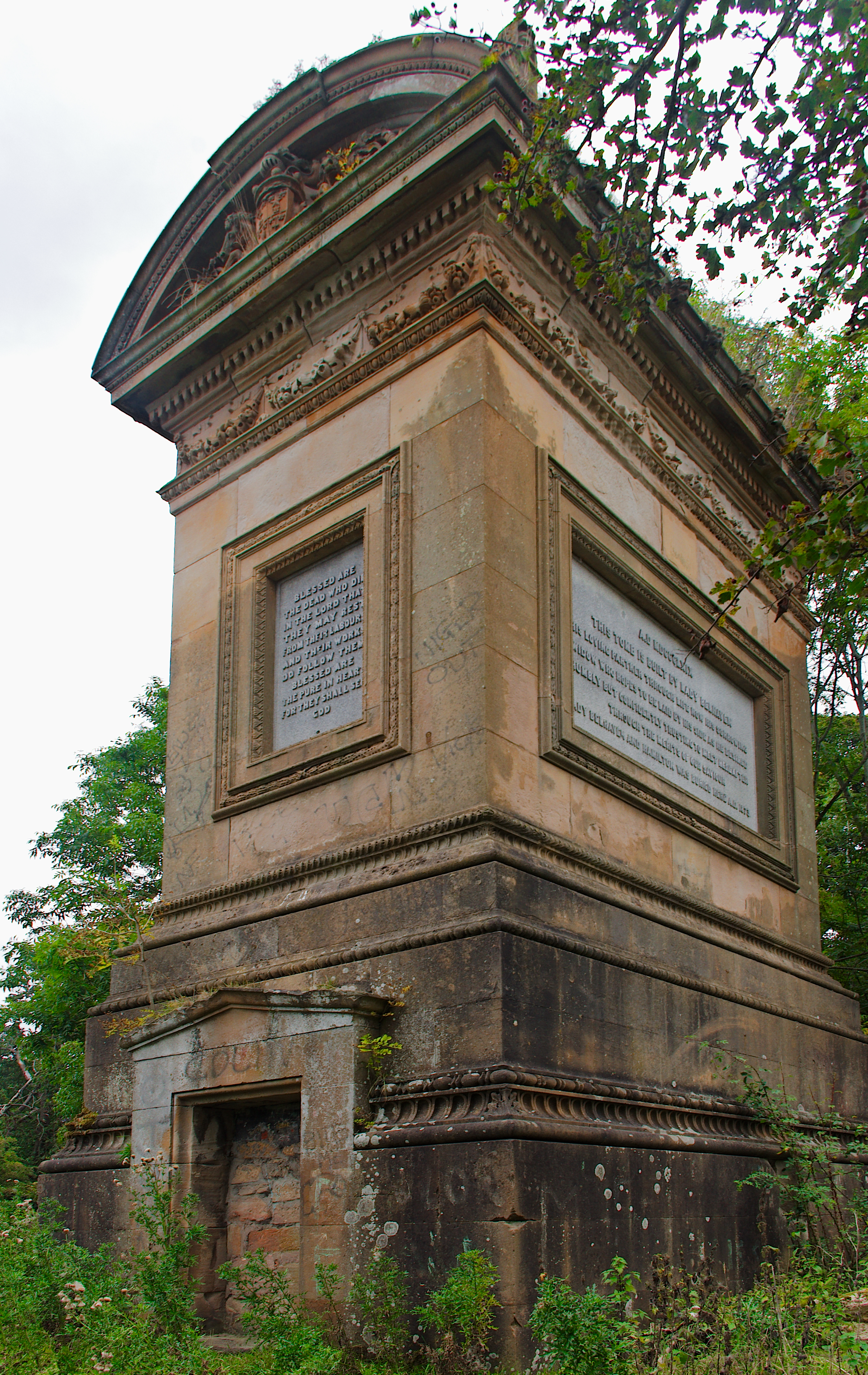
The mausoleum of Hamilton in St Michael's Kirkyard, Cambusnethan

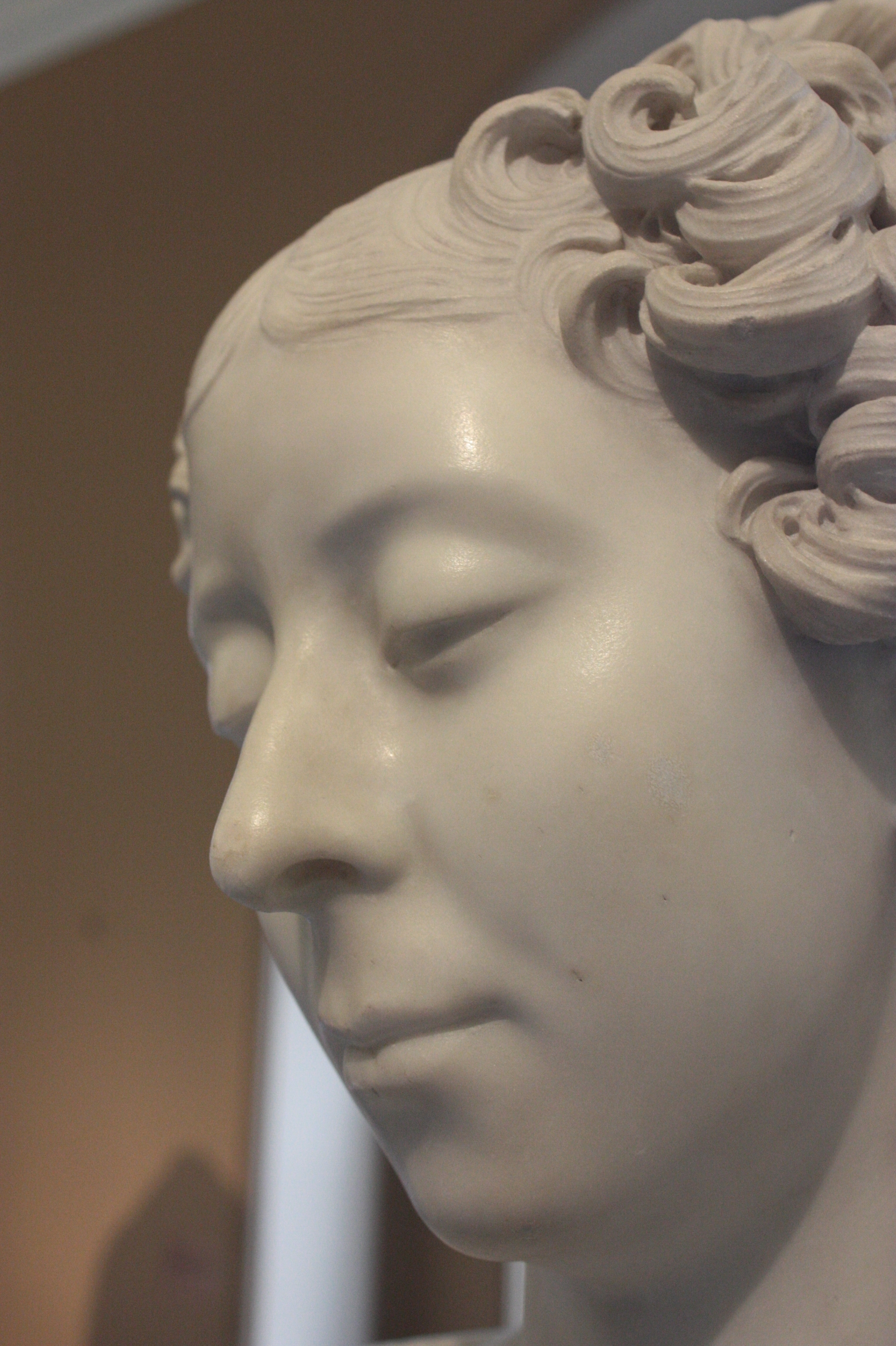
Hamilton Campbell, Lady Belhaven and Stenton by Samuel Joseph, 1827, Victoria and Albert Museum

He married Hamilton Campbell, daughter of Walter Frederick Campbell and Mary Nisbet, in 1815; they had no children. Hamilton died on 22 December 1868, aged 75 and was buried in Cambusnethan Kirkyard, where his large mausoleum still stands, although the kirk no longer exists. The kirkyard is located close to Wishaw, by the River Clyde. On his death, the barony of Hamilton of Wishaw became extinct while the lordship of Belhaven and Stenton became dormant.

Honorary titles
Preceded by The Duke of Hamilton	Lord Lieutenant of Lanarkshire; 1863–1868	Succeeded by Sir Thomas Colebrooke
Peerage of the United Kingdom
New creation	Baron Hamilton of Wishaw; 1832–1868	Extinct
Peerage of Scotland
Preceded by William Hamilton	Lord Belhaven and Stenton; 1814–1868	Succeeded by Dormant (confirmed in 1875 for James Hamilton)
