= Sir Walter Farquhar, 3rd Baronet =

British landowner (1810–1900)

Sir Walter Farquhar, Bt JP DL

High Sheriff of Surrey
- In office 1859–1859
- Preceded by: Hon. George John Cavendish
- Succeeded by: William John Evelyn

Personal details
- Born: Walter Rockcliffe Farquhar; 4 June 1810 St James's Street, London
- Died: 15 July 1900 (aged 90) Polesden Lacey, Surrey
- Spouse: Lady Mary Octavia Somerset (m. 1837; died 1900)
- Relations: Sir Walter Farquhar, 1st Baronet (grandfather)
- Children: 10
- Parent(s): Sir Thomas Farquhar, 2nd Baronet; Sybella Martha Rockcliffe
- Education: Eton College

Sir Walter Rockcliffe Farquhar, 3rd Baronet JP DL (4 June 1810 – 15 July 1900) was an English landowner of Scottish heritage.

== Early life ==
Farquhar was born on 4 June 1810 in St James's Street, London. He was the son of Sir Thomas Farquhar, 2nd Baronet and Sybella Martha Rockcliffe, a daughter of the Reverend Morton Rockcliffe. Among his siblings were Barbarina Sophia Farquhar (wife of Mark Milbank, MP for Camelford who was a grandson of the 1st Duke of Cleveland), Ann Sybella Martha Farquhar (wife of George Clive, MP for Hereford who was a grandson of the 2nd Baron Archer), Caroline Eliza Farquhar (wife of Lt.-Gen. Hon. Charles Grey, son of the 2nd Earl Grey), and Harvie Morton Farquhar (who married Hon. Louisa Ridley-Colborne, daughter of the 1st Baron Colborne).

His paternal grandparents were Anne (née Stevenson) Harvie, widow of Dr. Thomas Harvie, and Sir Walter Farquhar, 1st Baronet, a prominent Scottish physician whose clientele included the Prince of Wales (later King George IV) and the Prime Minister William Pitt. Among his extended family were uncle Robert Townsend Farquhar, who was also created a baronet of Mauritius in 1821. His first cousin, Sir Walter Townsend-Farquhar, 2nd Baronet, was a Conservative MP for Hertford. Through his sister Barbarina, he was uncle to Frederick Milbank, an MP who was created a baronet of Well and Hart. Through his sister Caroline, he was uncle to Sybil Beauclerk, Duchess of St Albans, Albert Grey, 4th Earl Grey, Louisa McDonnell, Countess of Antrim, and Mary Elliot-Murray-Kynynmound, Countess of Minto. Through his brother Harvie, he was uncle to Helen Farquhar, the prominent British numismatist.

Farquhar was educated at Eton College.

== Career ==
Upon the death of his father on 12 January 1836, he succeeded as the 3rd Baronet Farquhar. He held the office of High Sheriff of Surrey in 1859. He also served as a Justice of the Peace for Middlesex and Surrey and Deputy Lieutenant of Surrey. Sir Walter was also a member of the banking firm of Herries, Farquhar and Co.

According to his obituary, he "was connected from his early days with many philanthropic objects, and was the friend of Mr. Gladstone and Bishop Wilberforce."

In 1853, Sir Walter acquired Polesden Lacey, located on the North Downs at Great Bookham, near Dorking, Surrey, who held it until his death. After his death, it was acquired by Margaret Greville who expanded it and extensively remodelled the home in 1906.

== Personal life ==
On 28 November 1837, Sir Walter married Lady Mary Octavia Somerset (1814–1906), daughter of Henry Somerset, 6th Duke of Beaufort and Lady Charlotte Leveson-Gower (a daughter of the 1st Marquess of Stafford). Together, they lived at Cadogan House, London and were the parents of:

- Sir Henry Thomas Farquhar, 4th Baronet (1838–1916), who married Hon. Alice Brand, daughter of Henry Brand, 1st Viscount Hampden and Eliza Ellice (daughter of Gen. Robert Ellice by his wife Eliza Courtney, herself an illegitimate daughter of the 2nd Earl Grey by Georgiana, Duchess of Devonshire), in 1862.
- Walter Randolph Farquhar (1842–1901), who married Hon. Kathleen Bateson, daughter of Thomas Bateson, 1st Baron Deramore and Hon. Caroline Elizabeth Anne Rice-Trevor (a daughter of the 4th Baron Dynevor, MP for Carmarthenshire), in 1877.
- Arthur Farquhar (1843–1883), a Colonel in the Egyptian Army who was Chief of Staff to Hicks Pasha and was killed in Sudan.
- Mary Blanche Farquhar (c. 1845–1916), who married Richard Somerset, 2nd Baron Raglan, son of FitzRoy Somerset, 1st Baron Raglan and Lady Emily Wellesley-Pole (a daughter of the 3rd Earl of Mornington), in 1871.
- Charlotte Louisa Farquhar (c. 1847–1923)
- Sybella Charlotte Farquhar (c. 1848–1886), who married Anthony Evelyn Ashley, son of Anthony Ashley-Cooper, 7th Earl of Shaftesbury and Lady Emily Cowper (daughter of the 5th Earl Cowper), in 1866.
- Granville Frederick Richard Farquhar (1849–1934), who married Helen Margaretta Livingston, daughter of Edward Louis Livingston and Mary Josephine Kernochan, in 1896.
- Harriet Blanche Elizabeth Farquhar (c. 1851–1923), who married Lt.-Col. Hon. George Bertie, son of Montagu Bertie, 6th Earl of Abingdon and Elizabeth Lavinia Anne Harcourt (only daughter of George Harcourt, MP), in 1885.
- Caroline Emily Horatia Farquhar (c. 1854–1938)
- FitzRoy James Wilberforce Farquhar (1858–1941), who married Ada Cradock-Hartopp, daughter of Sir John Cradock-Hartopp, 4th Baronet and Charlotte Frances Howard, in 1884.

Sir Walter died on 15 July 1900 and his funeral was held at Great Bookham Churchyard, near Polesden Lacey. He was succeeded in the baronetcy by his eldest son, Henry. His widow died on 7 September 1906.

Honorary titles
Preceded by Hon. George John Cavendish	High Sheriff of Surrey; 1859	Succeeded by William John Evelyn
Baronetage of Great Britain
Preceded by Thomas Harvie Farquhar	Baronet (of Cadogan House); 1836–1910	Succeeded by Henry Thomas Farquhar
