= Farquhar baronets =

There have been three baronetcies created for members of the Farquhar family, one in the Baronetage of Great Britain and two in the Baronetage of the United Kingdom. One creation is extant as of 2026.

- Farquhar baronets of Cadogan House (1796)
- Townsend-Farquhar baronets of Mauritius (1821)
- Farquhar baronets of Cavendish Square (1892): see Horace Farquhar, 1st Earl Farquhar
