= Richard Terrick =

British Bishop

The Right Reverend and Right Honourable Richard Terrick
- Bishop of London
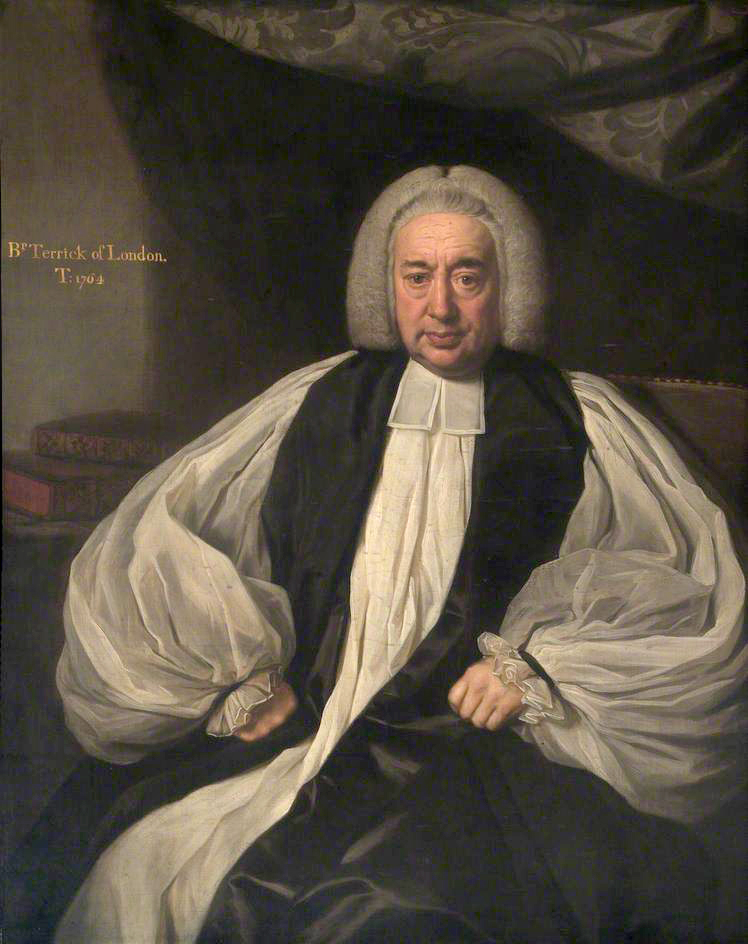
- Richard Terrick (Nathaniel Dance-Holland)
- Church: Church of England
- Diocese: Diocese of London
- Elected: 1764
- Term ended: 1777 (death)
- Predecessor: Richard Osbaldeston
- Successor: Robert Lowth
- Other posts: Bishop of Peterborough; 1757–1764

Orders
- Consecration: c. 1757

Personal details
- Born: York
- Baptised: 20 July 1710
- Died: 31 March 1777 (aged 66)
- Buried: All Saints Church, Fulham
- Denomination: Anglican
- Spouse: Tabitha Stainforth
- Education: Clare College, Cambridge

Richard Terrick (bapt. 20 July 1710 – 31 March 1777) was a Church of England clergyman who served as Bishop of Peterborough 1757–1764 and Bishop of London 1764–1777.

== Life ==
Terrick was born in York, the eldest son of Samuel Terrick, rector of Wheldrake and residentiary canon of York Minster. He was the great-grandson of Samuel Terrick. Terrick was educated at Clare College, Cambridge, graduating BA in 1729 (MA in 1733) and DD in 1747.

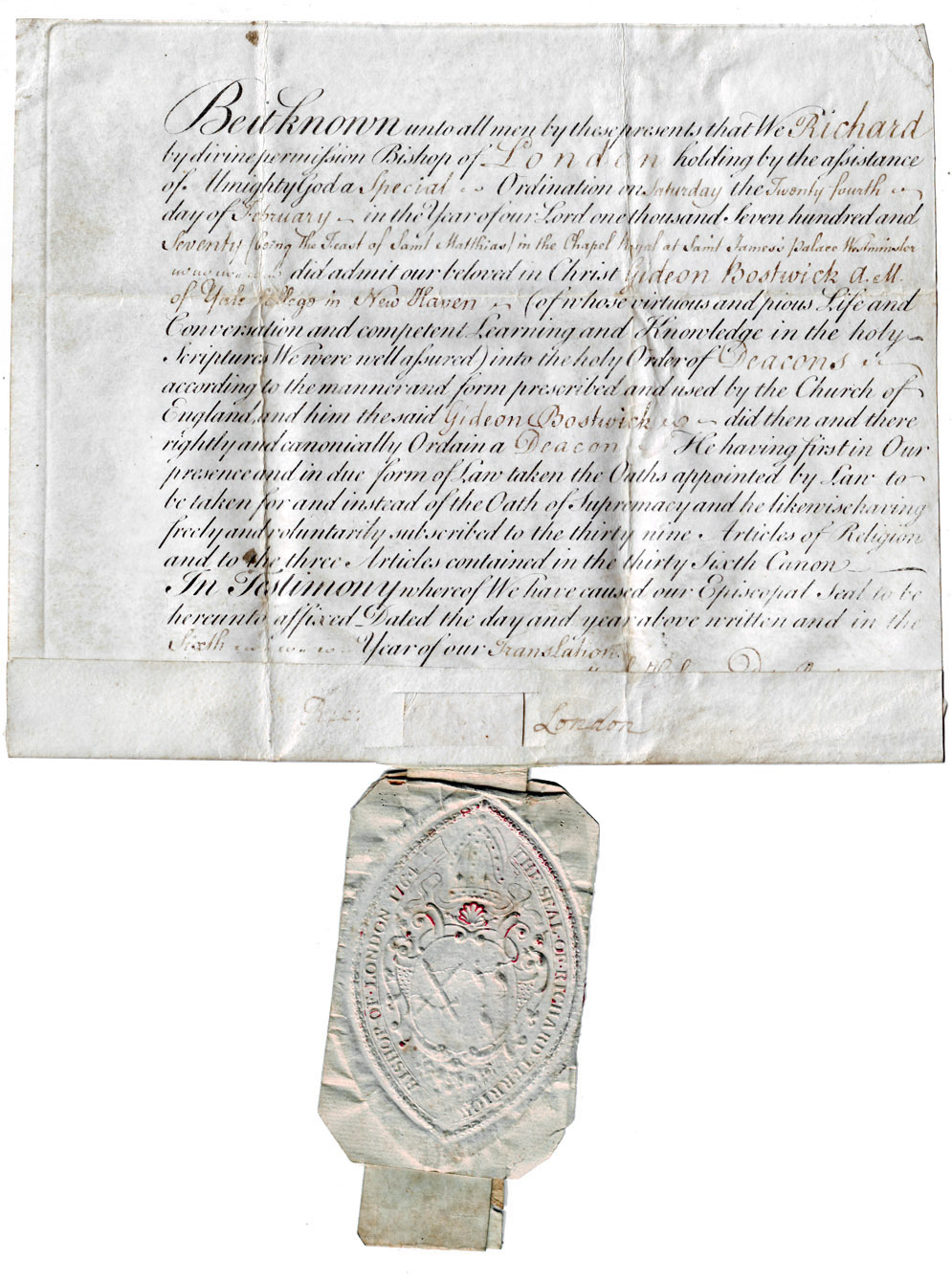
A certificate of ordination (with seal) given at Westminster by Richard Terrick, Bishop of London, February 24, 1770.

He was preacher at the Rolls Chapel from 1736 to 1757, Chaplain to the Speaker of the House of Commons from 1739 to 1742, Canon of the fourth stall at St George's Chapel, Windsor Castle from 1742 to 1749, and vicar of Twickenham from 1749. He was appointed Bishop of Peterborough in 1757 through the influence of the Duke of Devonshire, the then Prime Minister, but subsequently transferred his allegiance to the Earl of Bute. He was promoted to the bishopric of London in 1764, also joining the Privy Council ex officio. He declined the archbishopric of York in 1776 on the grounds of ill health, dying on Easter Monday 1777.

Horace Walpole, who disliked Terrick, said he lacked ability, save "a sonorous delivery and an assiduity of backstairs address". On the other hand, Alexander Carlyle thought him "a truly excellent man of a liberal mind and excellent good temper" and "a famous good preacher and the best reader of prayers I ever heard".

== Attribution ==
- Courtney, William Prideaux (1898). "Terrick, Richard" . In Lee, Sidney (ed.). Dictionary of National Biography. Vol. 56. London: Smith, Elder & Co. pp. 78–79.

Church of England titles
Preceded by John Thomas	Bishop of Peterborough; 1757–1764	Succeeded by Robert Lamb
Preceded by Richard Osbaldeston	Bishop of London; 1764–1777	Succeeded by Robert Lowth
