= Hamilton (name) =

The name Hamilton probably originated in the village of Hamilton, Leicestershire, England, but bearers of that name became established in the 13th century in Lanarkshire, Scotland. The town of Hamilton, South Lanarkshire was named after the family some time before 1445. Contemporary Hamiltons are either descended from the original noble family, or descended from people named after the town.

== Scottish nobility ==
- Duke of Hamilton, a title in the Peerage of Scotland
- Douglas-Hamilton, the family surname of the Dukes of Hamilton and Earls of Selkirk
- Duke of Abercorn, a title in the Peerage of Ireland, the dukes having the surname Hamilton
- Earl of Haddington, a title in the Peerage of Scotland, the earls having the surname Bailie-Hamilton
- Lord Belhaven and Stenton, a title in the Peerage of Scotland, the lords having the surname Hamilton
- Baron Hamilton (disambiguation)
- Lord Hamilton (disambiguation)
- Clan Hamilton

== People with the surname ==
=== Names borne by several notable people ===
- Adam Hamilton (disambiguation)
- Alexander Hamilton (disambiguation) (including Alex Hamilton)
- Andrew Hamilton (disambiguation) (including Andy Hamilton)
- Ann Hamilton (disambiguation)
- Anne Hamilton (disambiguation)
- Anthony Hamilton (disambiguation)
- Archibald Hamilton (disambiguation) (including Archie Hamilton)
- Arthur Hamilton (disambiguation)
- Barbara Hamilton (disambiguation)
- Bob Hamilton (disambiguation)
- Brian Hamilton (disambiguation)
- Carl Hamilton (disambiguation)
- Charles Hamilton (disambiguation)
- Claud Hamilton (disambiguation)
- Clayton Hamilton (disambiguation)
- Curtis Hamilton (disambiguation)
- Daniel Hamilton (disambiguation)
- David Hamilton (disambiguation) (including Dave Hamilton and Davey Hamilton)
- Diana Hamilton (disambiguation)
- Don Hamilton (disambiguation)
- Doug Hamilton (disambiguation)
- Douglas Hamilton (disambiguation)
- Douglas Douglas-Hamilton (disambiguation)
- Duncan Hamilton (disambiguation)
- Edward Hamilton (disambiguation) (including Ed Hamilton)
- Elizabeth Hamilton (disambiguation)
- Eric Hamilton (disambiguation)
- Francis Hamilton (disambiguation)
- Frank Hamilton (disambiguation)
- Fred Hamilton (disambiguation)
- Frederick Hamilton (disambiguation)
- Gary Hamilton (disambiguation)
- Gavin Hamilton (disambiguation)
- George Hamilton (disambiguation)
- Gerald Hamilton (disambiguation)
- Gordon Hamilton (disambiguation)
- Grace Hamilton (disambiguation)
- Gustavus Hamilton (disambiguation)
- Henry Hamilton (disambiguation)
- Hugh Hamilton (disambiguation)
- Hugo Hamilton (disambiguation)
- Iain Hamilton (disambiguation)
- Ian Hamilton (disambiguation)
- Jack Hamilton (disambiguation)
- James Hamilton (disambiguation)
- Jamie Hamilton (disambiguation)
- Jane Hamilton (disambiguation)
- Jeff Hamilton (disambiguation) (including Jeffrey Hamilton)
- Jim Hamilton (disambiguation)
- Jo Hamilton (disambiguation)
- John Hamilton (disambiguation)
- Joseph Hamilton (disambiguation) (including Joe Hamilton, Jody Hamilton, and Joey Hamilton)
- Justin Hamilton (disambiguation)
- Keith Hamilton (disambiguation)
- Lee Hamilton (disambiguation)
- Lewis Hamilton (disambiguation)
- Lynn Hamilton (disambiguation)
- Malcolm Hamilton (disambiguation)
- Margaret Hamilton (disambiguation)
- Mark Hamilton (disambiguation)
- Mary Hamilton (disambiguation)
- Matt Hamilton (disambiguation)
- Michael Hamilton (disambiguation) (including Mike Hamilton)
- Neil Hamilton (disambiguation)
- Nigel Hamilton (disambiguation)
- Patrick Hamilton (disambiguation)
- Paul Hamilton (disambiguation)
- Peter Hamilton (disambiguation) (including Pete Hamilton)
- Raymond Hamilton (disambiguation) (including Ray Hamilton)
- Reginald Hamilton (disambiguation) (including Reggie Hamilton and Reg Hamilton)
- Richard Hamilton (disambiguation) (including Rick Hamilton)
- Robert Hamilton (disambiguation) (including Bob Hamilton and Bobby Hamilton)
- Russ Hamilton (disambiguation)
- Scott Hamilton (disambiguation)
- Steve Hamilton (disambiguation) (including Steven Hamilton or Stephen Hamilton)
- Sue Hamilton (disambiguation)
- Thomas Hamilton (disambiguation) (including Tom Hamilton)
- Tim Hamilton (disambiguation)
- Wendy Hamilton (disambiguation)
- William Hamilton (disambiguation) (including Bill Hamilton, Billy Hamilton and Willie Hamilton)

=== Individuals ===
- Hamilton (surname)

== People with the given name ==
- Hamilton Shirley Amerasinghe (1913–1980), Sri Lankan Sinhala diplomat
- Hamilton Basso (1904–1964), American writer
- Hamilton Bohannon (1942–2020), American percussionist, band leader, songwriter, and record producer
- Hamilton S. Burnett (1895–1973), justice of the Tennessee Supreme Court
- Hamilton Camp (1934–2005), British actor
- Hamilton Coolidge (1895-1918), American World War I flying ace
- Hamilton Evangelista dos Santos (1931–2011), Brazilian footballer
- Hamílton Hênio Ferreira Calheiros (born 1980), Brazilian-Togolese footballer, known as Hamílton
- Hamilton Fish (disambiguation), several people
- Hamilton Green (born 1934), prime minister of Guyana
- Hamilton Harty (1879–1941), Irish composer
- Hamilton Jordan (1944–2008), American politician
- Hamilton Lima e Silva (born 1960), Brazilian footballer
- Hamilton Luske (1903–1968), American animator and film director
- Hamilton Masakadza (born 1983), Zimbabwean cricketer
- Hamilton Morris (born 1987), American journalist and pharmacologist
- Hamilton Paul (1773–1854), Scottish Presbyterian minister and writer
- Hámilton Ricard (born 1974), Colombian footballer
- Hamilton Robinson (South Carolina politician), American politician
- Hamilton Sabot (born 1987), French gymnast
- Hamilton O. Smith (born 1931), American microbiologist
- Hamilton Wanasinghe, general, Commander of the Sri Lanka Army from 1988 to 1991

=== People with the middle name ===
- Erskine Hamilton Childers (1905–1974), fourth president of Ireland and Fianna Fáil minister
- James Hamilton Iain Kay (born 1949), Zimbabwean farmer and politician
- James Hamilton Leithauser (born 1978), American musician who goes by Hamilton
- John Hamilton McWhorter (born 1965), American linguist
- Antônio Hamilton Martins Mourão (born 1953), retired Brazilian Army general and vice president of Brazil
- Frank Hamilton Talbot (1930–1994), Australian ichthyologist, former director of the Australian Museum
- Sir Timothy James Hamilton Laurence, the 2nd husband of Anne, Princess Royal and a retired Royal Navy officer.

== Fictional characters ==
- Audrey fforbes-Hamilton, character from To the Manor Born
- Carl Hamilton (fictional character), spy created by Jan Guillou
- Charles Hamilton, first husband of Scarlett O'Hara in Gone with the Wind
- Melanie Hamilton, Scarlett O'Hara's sister-in-law from Gone with the Wind
- Gil Hamilton, detective created by Larry Niven
- Jack Hamilton, fictional character created by Philip K. Dick and found in the novel Eye in the Sky
- Marcus Hamilton (Angel), a character from the TV series Angel
- Professor Hamilton, Emil Hamilton, a supporting character from Superman comics
- Hamilton Burger, the L.A. district attorney in the Perry Mason novels
- Hamilton Fleming, a character from the short-lived TV series Young Americans
- Hamilton Hocks, a stuffed pig character from Maggie and the Ferocious Beast
- Hamilton Porter, a character from The Sandlot
- Mary Rose Hamilton, character in Lolita
- Holly Hamilton played by Hilary Duff in The Perfect Man
- Jenna Hamilton (Ashley Rickards) in the MTV series, Awkward
- Lacey Hamilton (Nikki DeLoach) in the MTV series, Awkward
- Kevin Hamilton (Mike Faiola) in the MTV series, Awkward
- Lisa Hamilton from the video game series, Dead or Alive
- Devon Hamilton (Bryton James) on the soap opera The Young and the Restless
- Hamilton Holt, character from The 39 Clues
