= Gustaf Hamilton =

Gustaf Hamilton may refer to:

- Gustaf Wathier Hamilton (1783–1835), Swedish count, jurist and official
- Gustav Hamilton (1650s–1691), chief of defence in Northern Ireland
- Gustaf David Hamilton (1699–1788), Swedish count and soldier
