= Andrew Hamilton =

Andrew or Andy Hamilton may refer to:

== Arts and entertainment ==
- Andy Hamilton (jazz saxophonist) (1918–2012), Jamaican-born British jazz saxophonist
- Andy Hamilton (pop saxophonist) (born 1953), British pop saxophonist
- Andy Hamilton (born 1954), British comedian

== Law and politics ==
- Andrew Hamilton, Lord Redhouse (c.1565–1634), Scottish jurist
- Andrew Hamilton (New Jersey governor) (died 1703), American colonial governor
- Andrew Hamilton (lawyer) (1676–1741), Scottish attorney in colonial Pennsylvania
- Andrew Jackson Hamilton (1815–1875), US congressman and provisional governor of Texas
- Andrew H. Hamilton (1834–1895), US congressman

== Sports ==
- Andrew Hamilton (footballer, born 1873) (1873–1929), Scottish footballer
- Andrew Hamilton (footballer, born 1882) (1882–1915), Scottish footballer
- Andrew Hamilton (rugby union) (1893–1975), Scotland rugby union player
- Andy Hamilton (American football) (born 1950), American football player
- Sir Andrew Hamilton, 10th Baronet (born 1953), English cricketer
- Andy Hamilton (darts player) (born 1967), British darts player
- Andrew Hamilton (rugby league) (born 1971), Australian rugby league player
- Andrew Hamilton (canoeist), British canoeist

== Others ==
- Andrew Hamilton of Goslington (died 1592), Scottish landowner
- Andrew Hamilton (priest) (died 1754), Anglican priest in Ireland
- Andrew D. Hamilton (born 1952), British chemist
- Andy Hamilton (author) (born 1974), British author

== Other uses ==
- SS Andrew Hamilton, American Liberty ship
