= Annie Hamilton (disambiguation) =

Annie Hamilton (born 1992) is an American actress.

Annie Hamilton may also refer to:

- Annie Hamilton, fictional character in the video game series Power Instinct
- Annie Hamilton (born 1990s), singer-songwriter, guitarist, and former member of Little May
- Annie Isabella Hamilton (1866–1941), Canadian physician

== Other uses ==
- Annie Hamilton, wife of Charles H. Munro (1837–1908), Canadian physician and political figure
- Annie Hamilton, mother of Robert Pohlman (1811–1877), Australian lawyer and judge

== See also ==
- Ann Hamilton (disambiguation)
- Anne Hamilton (disambiguation)
