= General Hamilton =

General Hamilton may refer to:

== United Kingdom ==
- Bruce Hamilton (British Army officer) (1857–1936), British Army general
- Douglas Hamilton (1818–1892), British Indian Army general
- Edward Hamilton (British Army officer) (1854–1944), British Army major general
- Frederick William Hamilton (1815–1890), British Army general
- George Hamilton, 1st Earl of Orkney (1666–1737), British Army general
- Hubert Hamilton (1861–1914), British Army major general
- Ian Hamilton (British Army officer) (1853–1947), British Army general
- James Hamilton, 4th Duke of Hamilton (1658–1712), Scottish lieutenant general
- James Inglis Hamilton (1728–1803), British Army general
- John Hamilton (Jacobite) (died 1691), Kingdom of Ireland major general
- Sir John Hamilton, 1st Baronet, of Woodbrook (1755–1835), British Army lieutenant general

== United States ==
- Alexander Hamilton (c. 1755–1804), U.S. Army major general
- Alexander Hamilton (general) (1815–1907), New York State Militia major general in the American Civil War
- Charles Smith Hamilton (1822–1891), Union Army major general
- Mark R. Hamilton (born 1945), U.S. Army major general
- Pierpont M. Hamilton (1898–1982), U.S. Air Force major general
- Schuyler Hamilton (1822–1903), Union Army brigadier general and nominee unconfirmed for major general
- Winfield Scott Hancock (1824–1886), Union Army major general

== Other ==
- Sir George Hamilton, Comte Hamilton (died 1676), Irish-born French Army major general
- Gustaf David Hamilton (1699–1788), Swedish Army lieutenant general
- Hugo Hamilton, Baron Hamilton (died 1724), Swedish Army general

== See also ==
- Sir John Hamilton-Dalrymple, 5th Baronet (1780–1835), British Army major general
- Alexander Hamilton-Gordon (British Army officer, born 1817) (1817–1890), British Army general
- Alexander Hamilton-Gordon (British Army officer, born 1859) (1859–1939), British Army lieutenant general
- Attorney General Hamilton (disambiguation)
