= Hugh Hamilton =

Hugh Hamilton may refer to:

== Military ==
- Hugh Hamilton, 1st Viscount of Glenawly (c. 1600–1678), Irish aristocrat, soldier in Swedish and English service
- Hugo Hamilton, Baron Hamilton (died 1724), Swedish military commander and nephew of Hugh Hamilton, 1st Viscount of Glenawly
- Hugh Hamilton (sailor) (1830–1890), American Civil War sailor and Medal of Honor recipient

== Others ==
- Hugh Douglas Hamilton (1740–1808), Irish artist
- Hugh Hamilton (bishop) (1729–1805), mathematician, natural philosopher and Church of Ireland bishop
- Hugh Hamilton (mayor), New Zealand former lawyer, mayor of Central Hawke's Bay, and convicted fraudster
- Hugh Hamilton (rugby union) (1854–1930), Scotland international rugby union player
- Hugh Hamilton (racing driver) (1905–1934), British racing driver
