= Edward Hamilton =

Edward Hamilton may refer to:

- Sir Edward Hamilton, 1st Baronet (1772–1851), Royal Navy admiral
  - Sir Edward Hamilton (1800 ship), merchant ship
- Edward D. Hamilton (1801–1883), secretary of the Oregon Territory, 1850–1853
- Edward Hamilton (pastoralist) (1809–1898), British pastoralist in New South Wales and member of parliament for Salisbury
- Edward Hamilton (homeopath) (1815–1903), British homeopath
- Edward Hamilton (priest) (1819–1896), cleric in the Church of Ireland
- Edward Hamilton (Australian politician) (1831–?), architect and member of the House of Assembly in South Australia
- Sir Edward Walter Hamilton (1847–1908), British political diarist and private secretary to William Ewart Gladstone
- Sir Edward Hamilton (British Army officer) (1854–1944), British Army officer
- Edward L. Hamilton (1857–1923), U.S. representative from Michigan
- Ed Hamilton (American football) (1880–?), college football, basketball, and baseball player and coach
- Ted Hamilton (baseball) (fl. 1921–1924), American Negro league pitcher
- Edward S. Hamilton (1917–2006), American World War II veteran and CIA operative
- Ted Hamilton (born 1937), Australian-born singer-songwriter and actor
- Ed Hamilton (born 1947), American sculptor
- Eddie Hamilton, British film editor
