= Hugo Hamilton =

Hugo Hamilton may refer to:

- Hugh Hamilton, 1st Viscount of Glenawly (c. 1600–1678), Scottish soldier in Swedish service
- Hugo Hamilton, Baron Hamilton (died 1724), Swedish military commander
- Hugo Hamilton (writer) (born 1953), Irish writer
- Hugo E. G. Hamilton (1849–1928), Swedish politician, speaker of Första kammaren 1916–28
