= Joseph Hamilton =

Joseph or Joe Hamilton may refer to:

== Sports ==
- Joseph Hamilton (American football coach) (1919–2014), American football coach
- Jody Hamilton (Joseph Hamilton, 1938–2021), American professional wrestler, promoter, and trainer
- Joe Hamilton (basketball) (born 1948), American basketball player
- Joey Hamilton (born 1970), American baseball player
- Joe Hamilton (American football) (born 1977), American football player and coach
- Joseph Hamilton (goalball) (born 1978), American goalball player

== Others ==
- Joseph B. Hamilton (1817–1902), American teacher, lawyer, judge, and Wisconsin state senator
- Joseph Hamilton (Wisconsin assemblyman) (1826–?), American politician; member of the Wisconsin state assembly
- Joseph "Jody" Hamilton (1885–1906), American mass murderer
- Joseph Gilbert Hamilton (1907–1957), American professor of medical physics and experimental medicine
- Joe Hamilton (producer) (1929–1991), American television producer; once married to comedian Carol Burnett
- Joseph H. Hamilton (born 1932), American physicist and professor at Vanderbilt University
- Joseph Hamilton (politician), Guyanese politician

== See also ==
- Jo Hamilton (disambiguation)
- Joseph Hamilton Beattie (1808–1871), locomotive engineer with the London and South Western Railway
- Joseph Hamilton Daveiss (1774–1811), commanded the Dragoons of the Indiana Militia at the Battle of Tippecanoe
- Hamilton (name)
