= Anthony Hamilton =

Anthony or Antony Hamilton may refer to:

- Anthony Hamilton (died 1719), Irish classical author, of aristocratic Scottish ancestry, who lived in France where he was known as Antoine Hamilton
- Anthony Hamilton (Archdeacon of Colchester) (1739–1812), English priest who served as both Archdeacon of London and Archdeacon of Colchester
- Anthony Hamilton-Smith, 3rd Baron Colwyn (1942–2024), English peer, legislator and dental surgeon
- Anthony Hamilton (born 1943), American musician and poet, of The Watts Prophets
- Antony Hamilton (1952–1995), Australian actor, model and dancer
- Anthony Hamilton (racing manager) (born 1960), British racing-car manager, father and former manager of Lewis Hamilton
- Anthony Hamilton (athlete) (born 1969), British Paralympic athlete
- Anthony Hamilton (musician) (born 1971), American R&B/soul singer-songwriter and record producer
- Anthony Hamilton (snooker player) (born 1971), English snooker player
- Anthony Hamilton (fighter) (born 1980), American mixed martial artist
- Anthony Hamilton (soccer) (born 1985), American soccer player
- Anthony Hamilton (archdeacon of Taunton) (1778–1851)

== See also ==
- Hamilton (name)
