= Adolf Ludvig Hamilton =

Swedish count and politician (1747–1802)

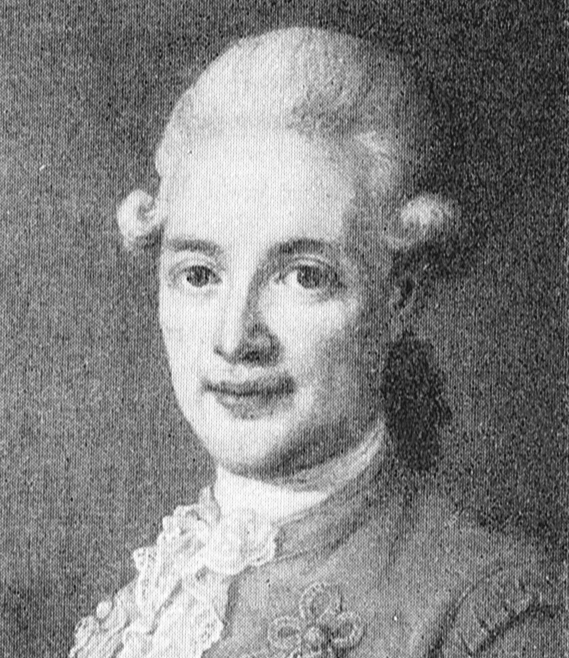
Count Adolf Ludvig Hamilton

Count Adolf Ludvig Hamilton (1747–1802) was a Swedish count and politician. His father was Count Gustaf David Hamilton. He was one of the leaders of the opposition of the nobility against King Gustav III of Sweden in 1789. He also authored a critical book about Gustav III: Anekdoter till svenska historien under Gustaf III:s regering.

== Biography ==
Adolf Ludvig Hamilton was the son of Gustaf David Hamilton. He became an ensign in 1759 and in 1766 he became chamberlain for the then crown prince Gustav III (later King Gustav III of Sweden). In 1771 he became chamberlain for Sophia Magdalena of Denmark. He resigned from this later post in 1782 and moved to the Blomberg estate in Västergötland, Sweden.

Count Hamilton was initially in favor of King Gustav III. However, he gradually developed a considerable hatred against the king, and after his resignation as chamberlain he joined the opposition in the Riksdag of the Estates. He was the first to proclaim in the Rikssalen at Stockholm Palace that the Act of Union and Security proposed by King Gustav III needed to be discussed separately by the four Estates. The act essentially provided King Gustav III tremendous power and simultaneously dramatically reduced the rights and privileges of the nobility. Hamilton was initially much in favor of the French Revolution, however, after observing the tyranny during the Reign of Terror his feelings towards Jacobinism became lukewarm and in 1800 he had reversed his position and became a royalist.

Hamilton had a French education and his writings and speeches often included satire. He was known and feared for his epigrams. After his resignation as a chamberlain he kept a diary, which is kept at the Hamiltonian archive at Barsebäck Castle. In his later years, probably in the year 1795, he completed the book Anecdoter till Gustaf III:s och Gustaf IV Adolfs historia, which contains many anecdotes about the influential people in the mid-18th century Sweden.

He was the father of Gustaf Wathier Hamilton.
