= Grace Hamilton (disambiguation) =

Grace Towns Hamilton (1907–1992) was an American politician.

Grace Hamilton may also refer to:

- Grace Hamilton, character in The Godfather Part III
- Grace Hamilton, character in The Love Hermit
- Grace Hamilton, known as Spice (musician), Jamaican dancehall artist
- Grace Hamilton (rugby), Australian rugby union and rugby league player
- Grace L. Hamilton (1894–1992), American artist
