= Brian Hamilton =

Brian Hamilton may refer to:

- Brian Hamilton (actor) (born 1964), American actor
- Brian Hamilton (fencer) (born 1937), Irish Olympic fencer
- Brian Hamilton (footballer) (born 1967), Scottish footballer
- Brian Hamilton (businessman), American entrepreneur and philanthropist
- Brian Hamilton, a short-lived character on The Young and the Restless

== See also ==
- Bryan Hamilton (born 1946), Northern Irish footballer
- Bryan Willis Hamilton (born 1983), American music producer and composer
