= Tommy Hamilton =

Irish footballer (1935–2025)

Personal information
- Date of birth: 22 March 1935
- Place of birth: Bray, Ireland
- Date of death: 25 August 2025 (aged 90)
- Position: Forward

Youth career
- Johnville

Senior career*
Years	Team	Apps	(Gls)
1953–1955	Manchester United	0	(0)
1955–1962	Shamrock Rovers	137	(44)
1962–1965	Cork Hibernians	62	(14)
1965–1969	Limerick	70	(15)

International career
1959–1960	Republic of Ireland	2	(0)
1960	Republic of Ireland B	1	(2)
1955–1963	League of Ireland XI	28	(1)
- * Club domestic league appearances and goals

Tommy Hamilton (22 March 1935 – 25 August 2025) was an Irish footballer who played as a forward.

== Club career ==
Hamilton was educated at Synge Street CBS in Dublin. His first club was Manchester United whom he joined in 1953, where he began playing as an inside forward for the third team and reserves. Hamilton had played for Johnville, where he was trained and scouted by Jem Kennedy who sent him to Manchester United. However, Hamilton was not prepared to be conscripted, so he came home to sign for Shamrock Rovers in November 1955, and made his debut against Waterford at Kilcohan Park on 6 November in a League of Ireland Shield match. The following season, he was the League's top scorer. Hamilton scored twice for Rovers in the European Champion Clubs' Cup. After scoring at Nice, he was ruled out of the home leg due to tonsillitis. He played three times in Europe for the Hoops.

Hamilton finished up scoring 44 League goals and nine FAI Cup goals as well as his two European strikes. His last competitive game for the Hoops was the 1962 FAI Cup final in which he scored twice. This made up for being bizarrely dropped for the 1957 and 1958 finals.

He shared his benefit match with Maxie McCann against Sunderland at Dalymount Park on 30 April 1962. That match was Hamilton's last match for Rovers as he joined Cork Hibernians in a player-exchange deal that brought Jackie Mooney to Milltown. The following week, he won the Soccer Personality of the Year Award. Hamilton spent three seasons there, before moving to Limerick, where he made another Cup final appearance, losing to Rovers. This qualified Limerick for the 1965–66 European Cup Winners' Cup, where Hamilton appeared. He retired in January 1969.

== International career ==
Hamilton represented the League of Ireland 20 times in his seven years at Milltown scoring once.

He won two caps for the Republic of Ireland making his debut in a 2–0 win over Czechoslovakia on 5 April 1959 in Ireland's first ever European Championship qualifier at Dalymount Park. His second and final cap was in the return game at Tehelne pole, Bratislava on 10 May. He also won one cap for the Republic of Ireland B national football team in 1960, scoring both goals in a 2–1 win over Iceland.

== Honours ==
Shamrock Rovers

- League of Ireland: 1956–57, 1958–59
- FAI Cup: 1956, 1962
- League of Ireland Shield: 1955–56, 1956–57, 1957–58
- Leinster Senior Cup: 1956, 1957, 1958
- Dublin City Cup: 1956–57, 1957–58, 1959–60
- Top Four Cup: 1956, 1958
- SWAI Personality of the Year: 1961–62
- Shamrock Rovers Hall of Fame: 1997

== See also ==
- Thomas Hamilton (disambiguation)

== Sources ==
- Paul Doolan; Robert Goggins. The Hoops. ISBN 0-7171-2121-6.
