= Daniel Hamilton =

Daniel Hamilton may refer to:

- Dan Hamilton (musician) (1946–1994), American singer-songwriter
- Dan Hamilton (politician) (born 1976), American politician
- Daniel Hamilton (Canadian politician) (died 1965), politician in Manitoba, Canada
- Daniel W. Hamilton (politician) (1861–1936), U.S. Representative from Iowa
- Daniel Hamilton (businessman) (1860–1939), Scotsman known for his work in cooperative system in Gosaba, West Bengal, India
- Daniel Hamilton (basketball) (born 1995), American basketball player
- Daniel W. Hamilton (lawyer), American lawyer and professor of law
