= Thomas Hamilton =

Thomas, Tommy, or Tom Hamilton may refer to:

== Scottish peers ==
- Thomas Hamilton, 1st Earl of Haddington (1563–1637), Scottish administrator, Lord Advocate and judge
- Thomas Hamilton, 2nd Earl of Haddington (1600–1640), Scottish nobleman
- Thomas Hamilton, 3rd Earl of Haddington (1626–1645), Scottish nobleman
- Thomas Hamilton, 6th Earl of Haddington (1680–1735), Scottish politician and nobleman
- Thomas Hamilton, 7th Earl of Haddington (1721–1794), Scottish nobleman
- Thomas Hamilton, 9th Earl of Haddington (1780–1858), British Conservative politician and statesman

== Literature and academia ==
- Thomas Hamilton (writer) (1789–1842), Scottish philosopher and author
- Thomas Hamilton (university administrator) (1842–1926), Northern Ireland clergyman and academician
- Thomas H. Hamilton (1914–1979), American academic administrator
- Thomas Wm. Hamilton (1939-), namesake of asteroid 4897 Tomhamilton

== Sports ==
- Thomas Ferrier Hamilton (1820–1905), Australian cricketer, also a pastoralist and politician
- Thomas Hamilton (cricketer, born 1992), English cricketer
- Thomas Hamilton (footballer, born 1872) (1872–1942), Scottish international footballer
- Thomas Hamilton (footballer, born 1906) (1906–1964), Scottish international footballer
- Thomas Hamilton (basketball) (born 1975), American basketball player
- Tom Hamilton (American football) (1905–1994), American football player, coach, college athletics administrator and naval aviator
- Tom Hamilton (baseball) (1925–1973), Major League Baseball player
- Tom Hamilton (footballer, born 1893) (1893–1959), Scottish footballer
- Tom Hamilton (sportscaster) (born 1954), radio announcer for the Cleveland Guardians Major League Baseball team
- Tommy Hamilton (born 1935), Irish former footballer

== Music ==
- Tom Hamilton (musician) (born 1951), American bassist with Aerosmith
- Tom Hamilton Jr. (born 1978), American songwriter, musician and producer
- Tom Hamilton (electronic musician), American pop/electro/rock musician

== Others ==
- Thomas Hamilton (architect) (1784–1858), Scottish architect, or his father, Thomas Hamilton (1754–1824), also an architect
- Thomas de Courcy Hamilton (1825–1908), Scottish recipient of the Victoria Cross
- Thomas Kinley Hamilton (1853–1917), Irish doctor and land speculator in Australia
- Thomas Glendenning Hamilton (1873–1935), Canadian doctor, school board trustee and member of the Manitoba legislature
- Thomas F. Hamilton (1894–1969), aviator and founder of the Hamilton Standard Company
- Thomas Watt Hamilton (1952–1996), perpetrator of the Dunblane massacre
- Tom Hamilton (politician) (born 1954), Unionist politician in Northern Ireland
- Thomas Hamilton, Lord Priestfield (died 1611), Scottish judge
- Thomas W. Hamilton (Medal of Honor) (1833–1869), United States Navy Medal of Honor recipient

== See also ==
- Hamilton (name)
