= James Spens (diplomat) =

Scottish adventurer, soldier, and diplomat (d. 1632)

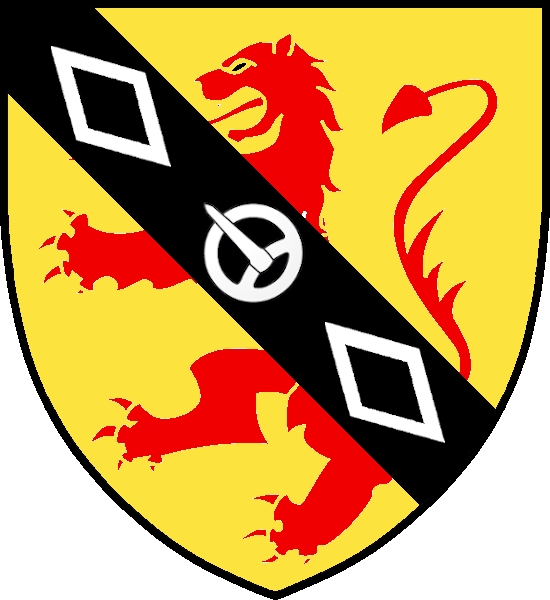
James Spens original coat of arms

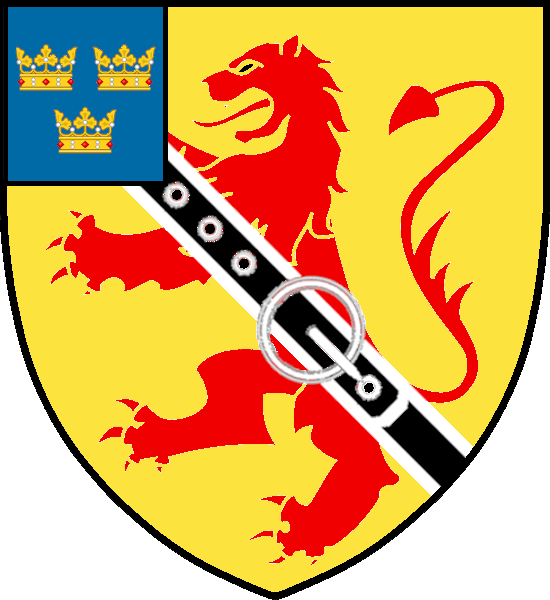
James Spens Swedish peerage coat of arms as friherre from 1628

Sir James Spens (died 1632) was a Scottish adventurer, soldier and diplomat, much concerned with Scandinavian and Baltic affairs, and an important figure in recruiting Scottish and English soldiers for the Thirty Years' War. He was raised to the Swedish peerage as friherre Jacob Spens.

== Early life ==
He was the son of David Spens of Wormiston (alternatively spelled Wormieston and Wormeston), by his wife Margaret Learmonth, daughter of Sir Patrik Learmonth of Dairsie. His father formed one of the party which captured the regent Matthew Stewart, 4th Earl of Lennox at Stirling in 1571, and was shot while trying to guard him from injury. Because of his treason, his estates were forfeited. In 1594 the son James was provost of Crail in Fife, and during the rising of Francis Stewart, 5th Earl of Bothwell he was called on to find security for the borough.

== The Lewis expedition ==
In 1598 Spens and other Scottish gentlemen, including his stepfather, Sir James Anstruther of that ilk, entered into a project for a plantation on the Isle of Lewis. With a grant from James VI of Scotland, they landed at Stornoway harbour in October 1599. At first all went well. They took peaceful possession of the country, and the inhabitants, mostly of Clan MacLeod, submitted to them. But they were resisted in the longer term by Neil MacLeod, and Spens was taken hostage by him.

The attack on Lewis was renewed by others in 1605, but the undertaking again proved too much for private adventurers.

== Ambassador, Spy-master and Soldier ==
On being released by MacLeod, Spens entered the service of Charles IX of Sweden, and raised several thousand foot and horse for Sweden, thereby earning the rank of colonel, though he never joined his troops in the field. In July 1609 the Earl of Worcester heard that King James preferred to employ Spens rather than his step-brother, Robert Anstruther, to convey troops from Ireland to service in Sweden.

When tension erupted with Denmark in 1611, Spens was recalled by James VI & I, who wished to promote peace between Sweden and Denmark, and was unwilling to allow troops for the Swedish service to be recruited from Scotland – at least officially. In the beginning of 1612 James sent Sir James, now a knight, to Sweden, as ambassador on the accession of Gustavus Adolphus, to urge on him the expediency of peace with Denmark. The Treaty of Knäred ended the Kalmar War, and, with his step brother Robert Anstruther, Spens contributed to its negotiation.

In 1614, and often subsequently, Spens conveyed a request to the London court on behalf of Gustavus Adolphus, in whose interests he worked consistently. On this occasion it concerned Samuel Cockburn and the Swedish wish to have him recruit Scottish troops. In 1615 Spens gained a pension in Scotland (surrendered in 1619), but continued in his duties as dual-ambassador, visiting London and Stockholm several times. He also used his time establishing an effective spy network for the Swedish Chancellor, Axel Oxenstierna. This he deployed mainly against Poland, and particularly against Scots working in the interest of the deposed Swedish king, Sigismund III Vasa.

In 1623 Spens was again in Sweden, and was sent by Gustavus to the Scottish privy council to request permission to levy troops in Scotland to repel a threatened Polish invasion. On 24 March 1624 the council authorised his son, James Spens, to levy a body of twelve hundred men to aid the king of Sweden. In the same year Spens was commissioned to return to Sweden and to bring Gustavus into the alliance against Ferdinand II, Holy Roman Emperor which was projected by Great Britain, the Dutch Republic and France. He reached Stockholm in August and returned in January 1625 accompanied by Christian von Bellin, bearing Gustavus's demands. These were thought extravagant, and the more moderate proposals of Christian IV of Denmark having been accepted, Spens was despatched in March to persuade Gustavus to enter the confederacy as the ally of Denmark. Unsuccessful he returned to his role as military commander and embedded diplomat. His main regiment of Scots was based in Riga in Livonia from late 1624 onwards, while Spens continued with his shuttle diplomacy when required.

In 1627 Spens was dispatched to invest Gustavus, then occupied in the Polish–Swedish War (1626–1629), with the Order of the Garter. That he did in Dirschau; and moved on to Elbing, where he recruited John Durie as his secretary. On 28 April 1628 Gustavus made him friherre Spens awarding him the barony of Orreholmen.

In March 1629 Spens was commissioned by Gustavus to urge Charles I of England to support him in the Thirty Years' War. For the next year he was charged with the superintendence of Gustavus's levies in Scotland and England, and letters by him are extant on this subject. He moved with his regiment into Germany in 1630 and followed the main Swedish army in the company of Gustavus Adolphus.

== Family ==
He married Agnes Durie, by whom he had three sons (James and David and William), and daughters Cecilia, Isabella and one daughter whose name is unknown. Cecilia was married to David Drummond, colonel of Kalmar Regiment and major-general of foot in Swedish service. She died a widow in Sweden, 1645.

His second wife was Margaret Forrat (Margaretha Forath) who he married in 1624. Together they had sons Axel and Jacob. After his death in 1632 his widow lobbied the Queen and the Swedish Chancellor for assistance and she and their children received money. Three of James' sons were ennobled as a result of Margaret's entreaties. Margaret later remarried, to Hugh Hamilton, 1st Viscount of Glenawly. Isobel Spens married James Ramsay, another Scot, who rose to high military rank in Swedish service and was much employed by Spens as an intermediary with Axel Oxenstierna.
