= Attorney General Hamilton =

Attorney General Hamilton may refer to:

- Andrew Jackson Hamilton (1815–1875), Attorney General of Texas
- Jo Hamilton (politician) (1827–1904), Attorney General of California
- Robert Wilson Hamilton (1819–1904), Attorney General of Fiji

== See also ==
- General Hamilton (disambiguation)
