= Margaret Forrat =

- Died: 1653

Margaret Forrat or Margaretha Forrat ( – 1653) was a Scottish noblewoman and landowner who gained money from the Swedish monarchy.

== Life ==
Details of her birth are unknown although her father, John Forratt was from Fife. Her father and brother, Captain Alexander Forrat, were mercenaries in Sweden.

She comes to notice when she married Sir James Spens of Wormiston in 1624. His will six years later documents their possessions. She was to receive fifteen farms and their house in Ala, Uppland and she would retain five of these farms even if she remarried. The ten farms would go to their son.

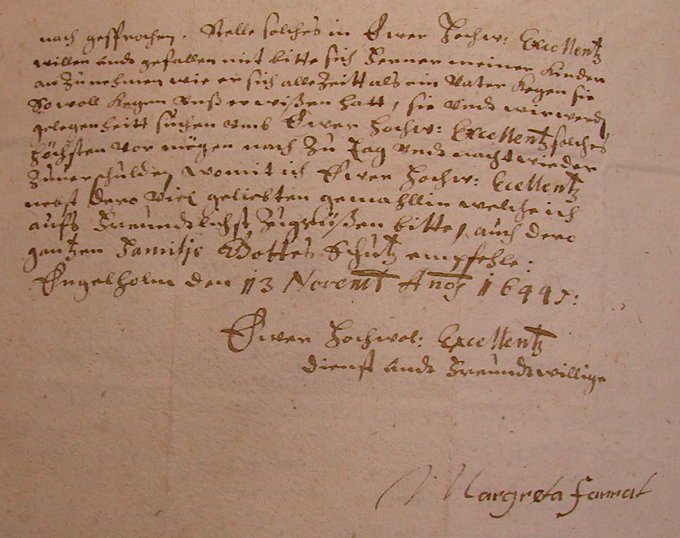
Margaret Forrat's letter

Her husband's will dated 1631 made small gifts to his daughters from his first marriage as they had already received dowries. His will seems to be concerned that his children might make demands upon his widow and for this reason he made appointed two guardians.

After her first husband died, she obtained a pension from Sweden's Queen Christina. Although her husband had made specific arrangements for the education of their children she appealed to the queen and she received a pension of 600 Riksdaler a year.

Axel Oxenstierna and his brother became a guardian of her two children. Axel was the chancellor of Sweden and she wrote to him to ask for money owing to her dead husband. She wrote in Latin and the letter is well crafted and extant. She said that her husband had not been buried and she faced such large debts that she could not even afford to pay the interest. Oxenstierrna interceded with the Swedish House of Nobility and her sons, Axel and Jacob, and her step son William Spens, were raised into the Swedish nobility.

In 1637 she became the first wife of Colonel Hugo Hamilton. He had some prestige in the Swedish army but correspondence shows that it was Margaret who held greater status.

She died in 1653. Hugo would marry again.
