= George Hamilton =

George Hamilton may refer to:

== Arts and entertainment ==
- George Hamilton IV (1937–2014), American country music performer
- George Hamilton (actor) (born 1939), American actor
- George Hamilton (musician) (1901–1957), father of the actor George Hamilton
- George Hamilton (Resident Evil), fictional character in the video games Resident Outbreak File #1 and File #2
- George Heard Hamilton (1910–2004), professor of art history at Yale University
- George Rostrevor Hamilton (1888–1967), English poet and critic

== Military ==
- Sir George Hamilton, Comte d'Hamilton (died 1676), Irish soldier in French service
- George Hamilton (soldier) (aft. 1658 – aft. 1728), Scottish soldier, member of parliament for Anstruther Burghs, and Jacobite
- George FitzGeorge Hamilton (1898–1918), British Army officer

== Politics ==
=== U.K. and Ireland ===
- Sir George Hamilton, 1st Baronet, of Donalong (c. 1607–1679), Irish baronet
- George Hamilton, 3rd Earl of Abercorn (c. 1636 – bef. 1683), Scottish nobleman
- George Hamilton, 4th Baron Hamilton of Strabane (1636/7 – 1668), Irish peer
- George Hamilton, 1st Earl of Orkney (1666–1737)
- George Hamilton (MP for Wells) (c. 1697–1775), member of parliament for Wells and for St Johnstown, Donegal
- George Hamilton (Irish judge) (1732–1793), Irish politician, barrister and judge
- George Hamilton (1732–1796), MP for Augher
- George Hamilton-Gordon, 4th Earl of Aberdeen (1784–1860), prime minister of the United Kingdom in 1852–1855
- George Alexander Hamilton (1802–1871), British politician and civil servant
- George Baillie-Hamilton, 10th Earl of Haddington (1802–1870), British politician
- Lord George Hamilton (1845–1927), British politician
- Sir George Hamilton, 1st Baronet, of Ilford (1877–1947), British politician
- George Douglas-Hamilton, 10th Earl of Selkirk (1906–1994), Scottish nobleman and politician

=== Other political figures ===
- George Hamilton (city founder) (1788–1836), Canadian politician and founder of Hamilton, Ontario
- George Wellesley Hamilton (1846–1915), Canadian politician
- George William Hamilton (1786–1857), planter and politician in Jamaica

== Sports ==
- George Hamilton (footballer) (1917–2001), Scottish footballer
- George Hamilton (broadcaster) (born 1951), association football commentator with RTÉ
- Eppie Hamilton (George Hamilton, 1900–?), American baseball player

== Religion ==
- George Hamilton (1699 moderator) (1635–1712), moderator of the General Assembly of the Church of Scotland
- George Hamilton (1805 moderator) (1757–1832), Church of Scotland minister and moderator of the General Assembly
- George Hamilton (canon) (1718–1787), canon of Windsor
- George Hamilton (archdeacon) (1823–1905), archdeacon of Lindisfarne and of Northumberland

== Other ==
- George Hamilton (lumber baron) (1781–1839), lumber baron in the Ottawa Valley
- George Ernest Hamilton (1800–1872), English civil engineer in South Australia
- George Hamilton (Australian police officer) (1812–1883), senior South Australian police commissioner
- George Douglas Hamilton (1835–1911), New Zealand run holder and station manager
- George Henry Hamilton (1875–1948), president of the Federal Reserve Bank of Kansas City
- George Hamilton (Northern Ireland police officer) (born 1967), chief constable of the Police Service of Northern Ireland from 2014
- Sir George Hamilton of Greenlaw and Roscrea (died between 1631 and 1657), undertaker in the Plantation of Ulster
