= Claud Hamilton =

Claud Hamilton may refer to:

== People ==
- Claud Hamilton, 1st Lord Paisley (1543–1621), Scottish politician
- Claud Hamilton of Shawfield (died 1614) Scottish landowner
- Claud Hamilton, 2nd Baron Hamilton of Strabane (1606–1638), Irish nobleman
- Claud Hamilton, 4th Earl of Abercorn (1659–1691), Irish and Scottish nobleman
- Lord Claud Hamilton (1787–1808), British nobleman and politician, son of the 1st Marquess of Abercorn
- Lord Claud Hamilton (1813–1884), British nobleman and politician, son of James Hamilton, Viscount Hamilton
- Lord Claud Hamilton (1843–1925), British member of parliament, son of the 1st Duke of Abercorn
- Lord Claud Hamilton (1889–1975), British soldier and courtier, Deputy Master of the Household, son of the 2nd Duke of Abercorn
- Claud Hamilton (architect), New Zealand-born architect active in Australia

== Other uses ==
- GER 'Claud Hamilton', a steam locomotive
- PS Claud Hamilton, a paddle steamer
