= Matt Hamilton =

Matt Hamilton or Matthew Hamilton may refer to:

- Matthew Hamilton of Milnburn (died 1564), Scottish courtier and landowner
- Matthew Hamilton Gault (1822 – 1877), Irish-Canadian financier and politician
- Matt Hamilton (born 1989), American curler
- Matt Hamilton (born 1990), British racing driver

== See also ==
- Hamilton (surname and title)
