= Gustavus Hamilton =

Gustavus Hamilton may refer to:

- Gustavus Hamilton, 1st Viscount Boyne (1642–1723), Vice-Admiral of Ulster, Irish MP for Donegal County 1692–1713 and Strabane
- Gustavus Hamilton (politician) (c. 1685–1735), son of Gustavus Hamilton, 1st Viscount Boyne, Irish MP for Donegal County 1716–35
- Gustavus Hamilton, 2nd Viscount Boyne (1710–46), Irish peer, English MP for Newtown (Isle of Wight)
- Gustavus Hamilton (painter) (1739-75), Irish painter

== See also ==
- Gustav Hamilton (c. 1650–1691), Swedish born noble, Irish Governor of Enniskillen
- Gustavus Hamilton-Russell, 10th Viscount Boyne (1931–95), Irish peer and Lord Lieutenant of Shropshire
