= Keith Hamilton =

Keith Hamilton may refer to:

- Keith Hamilton (American football) (born 1971), former American football defensive tackle
- Keith Hamilton (politician) (born 1936), former Australian Labor Party politician
- Keith N. Hamilton, American writer and government official
