= Jeff Hamilton =

Jeff Hamilton is the name of:

- Jeff Hamilton (1840–1941), enslaved man and free servant of the Houston family. See Sam Houston and slavery § Jeff Hamilton
- Jeff Hamilton (drummer) (born 1953), jazz drummer
- Jeff Hamilton (baseball) (born 1964), of the Los Angeles Dodgers
- Jeff Hamilton (ice hockey) (born 1977), of the Chicago Blackhawks
- Jeff Hamilton (designer) (born 1955), celebrity fashion designer

== See also ==
- Geoff Hamilton (1936–1996), British gardener
