= Mark Hamilton =

Mark Hamilton may refer to:

- Mark Hamilton (canoeist) (born 1961), American sprint canoer
- Mark Hamilton (doctor) (born 1970), British doctor and radio show host
- Mark Hamilton (baseball) (born 1984), American baseball player
- Mark Hamilton (bassist), bass guitarist for the Northern Irish alternative rock band Ash
- Mark Hamilton (guitarist), with UK rock band Quench
- Mark Hamilton (singer), Canadian indie rock musician with Woodpigeon
- Mark Hamilton (writer), publisher of Neo-Tech literature
- Mark R. Hamilton (born 1940s), American academic and former president of the University of Alaska
- Mark Hamilton (politician) (born 1956), American politician in the Georgia House of Representatives
- Friar Mark Hamilton, Scottish Dominican and author
- Mark Hamilton (police officer), British policeman

== See also ==
- Marc Hamilton (born 1944), French Canadian singer from Quebec
- Hamilton (name)
