= Eric Hamilton =

Eric Hamilton may refer to:

- Eric Hamilton (bishop) (1890–1962), English bishop
- Eric Hamilton (cricketer) (1913–1943), South African cricketer
- Eric Hamilton, developer of the JPEG File Interchange Format (JFIF)
- Eric Hamilton (American football) (born 1953), American football coach
