= Malcolm Hamilton =

Malcolm Hamilton may refer to:

- Malcolm Hamilton (bishop) (died 1629), Church of Ireland Archbishop of Cashel
- Lord Malcolm Douglas-Hamilton (1909–1964), Scottish politician and nobleman
- Malcolm Hamilton (harpsichordist) (1932–2003), American harpsichordist
- Malcolm Hamilton (American football) (born 1972), American football player
- Malcolm Hamilton (River City), a fictional character in the BBC Scotland TV soap opera River City
- Malcolm Hamilton (general) (1635–1699), son-in-law of Sir John Maclean, 1st Baronet
