= Jeff Hamilton (designer) =

Moroccan fashion designer

Jeff Hamilton (née Bohbot; August 17, 1955) is a Moroccan celebrity fashion designer known for his graphic embroidered leather jackets and their contribution to the iconography of sports and popular culture.

== Early life ==
Hamilton was born in Morocco, grew up in Paris, and emigrated to California when he was 24.

== Career ==
While working in the Los Angeles garment district in 1983, Hamilton met one of the founders of Guess Jeans, fellow French expatriate, Georges Marciano, and the two became friends. At this time, Guess Jeans only made clothing for women. Hamilton approached Marciano about acquiring the license to use the Guess name in order to create a clothing line for men, and Marciano agreed. Within two years, Hamilton’s menswear line for Guess reported $30 million in sales, up from $2 million in the first year. However, the partnership between Hamilton and Marciano ended contentiously in 1986.

Following the dissolution of Hamilton’s relationship with Guess, Hamilton began to design hand-embroidered, “unapologetically loud” logo leather jackets featuring bright colors and oversized graphics. He is credited for popularizing the NBA championship leather jacket style which permeated popular culture throughout the late eighties, nineties and into the early 2000s.

== Leather jackets ==
Hamilton is perhaps best known for the memorabilia he has designed for stars of the NBA and is himself considered to be a part of the sport's history. At the 1997 All Star game, when a panel selected the 50 Greatest Players in NBA History, each honoree received a unique NBA-commissioned Hamilton leather jacket to wear to the ceremony. Hamilton also designed the commemorative jackets 25 years later when the NBA announced a 75th Anniversary Team to honor the 75 greatest players in NBA history.

Hamilton designed jackets for Michael Jordan and The 1996 Chicago Bulls, which often rank among the top ten teams in basketball history. Hamilton championship jackets were also made for the 2000-2002 Los Angeles Lakers. During this period, the Los Angeles Lakers - led by Kobe Bryant and Shaquille O'Neal - won three consecutive NBA Championship Titles, becoming only the fifth team in NBA history to do so. Because these teams are remembered by NBA fans as basketball legend, the championship jackets themselves are considered to be a part of NBA lore.

At Kobe Bryant's final game in 2016, popular hip-hop artist Drake wore a custom Hamilton leather jacket embroidered with the words "Farewell Mamba."

== Popular culture ==
Comedian Martin Lawrence wore a quilted Jeff Hamilton jacket in the title sequence for his sitcom Martin, and 90s television host Arsenio Hall dubbed Hamilton the "emperor of the leather jacket." Other celebrities who have commissioned Hamilton pieces include: Madonna, Michael Jackson, George Michael, Vanilla Ice, Guns n’ Roses, P Diddy, A$AP Rocky, Bill Clinton, and Nelson Mandela. In hip-hop culture, a Jeff Hamilton jacket is considered a symbol of status and success. The Jeff Hamilton name has been used to this effect in rap songs by such rap artists as Cam’ron and Jay-Z.

== Influence ==
Hamilton’s designs for the NBA continue to influence the designers of other clothing brands. In 2018, Hamilton’s NBA championship jacket designs were unofficially referenced by streetwear brand Supreme in a collaboration with Nike. In 2021, lifestyle brand Converse, released a collection of footwear inspired by Hamilton’s best known NBA championship jackets.

== The Movie ==
In 2025, "Welcome to My Roots," directed and produced by David Serero, explores Hamilton’s triumphant return to his Moroccan origins and unveils the personal story behind the global fashion phenomenon, which premiered during the Paris Fashion Week 2025. The film features Snoop Dogg, Mike Tyson, Lebron James, Ugo Mozie, Constantin Brabus, Fengchen Wang, Mani Nordine, and many more.
