= Lord Hamilton =

The title Lord Hamilton may refer to one of the following:

- The Scottish Lordship of Parliament, Lord Hamilton, created for James Hamilton, 1st Lord Hamilton
- Duke of Hamilton, the title into which the Lordship of Parliament merged
- Arthur Hamilton, Lord Hamilton, retired Lord Justice General
- Archie Hamilton, Baron Hamilton of Epsom (born 1941), former British Member of Parliament and minister

Informally, the following titles of nobility, and any holders thereof:

- Three subsidiary titles of the Duke of Abercorn—
  - Marquess of Hamilton
  - Viscount Hamilton
  - Baron Hamilton of Strabane
- Baron Hamilton of Glenawley (1660)
- Baron Hamilton of Stackallen (1715)
- Baron Hamilton of Hameldon (1776)
- Baron Hamilton of Wishaw (1831)
- Baron Hamilton of Dalzell (1886)

Used incorrectly for courtesy title holders, it can refer to Lord George Hamilton
