= Frederick Hamilton =

Frederick or Frederic Hamilton may refer to:

- Frederick Hamilton (soldier) (1590–1647), Irish soldier of Scottish descent
- Frederick Hamilton (Londonderry politician) (1650–1732), Irish MP for Coleraine
- Frederick Hamilton (Donegal politician) (c. 1663–1715), Irish MP for Donegal County
- Frederick Hamilton (priest) (1728–1811), Anglican priest, archdeacon of Raphoe
- Frederick William Hamilton (1815–1890), British Army officer
- Frederick Hamilton-Temple-Blackwood, 1st Marquess of Dufferin and Ava (1826–1902), governor general of Canada and viceroy of India
- Lord Frederick Hamilton (1856–1928), British MP for South West Manchester and North Tyrone
- Frederick Hamilton (Royal Navy officer) (1856–1917), British admiral
- Frederick W. Hamilton (1860–1940), American businessman and president of Tufts University
- Frederick Orton Hamilton (1873–1945), New Zealand wool, grain, and produce and general merchant
- Frederick Hamilton-Temple-Blackwood, 3rd Marquess of Dufferin and Ava (1875–1930), British soldier and senator of the Northern Ireland Parliament
- Frederick Dalrymple-Hamilton (1890–1974), British admiral
- Frederic C. Hamilton (1927–2016), chairman of the Hamilton Companies LLC
- Frederic Hamilton (priest), archdeacon of Limerick
- Freddie Hamilton (born 1992), Canadian ice hockey forward

== See also ==
- Fred Hamilton (disambiguation)
