= Arthur Hamilton (disambiguation) =

Arthur Hamilton (1926–2025) was an American songwriter.

Arthur Hamilton may also refer to:

- Arthur Andrew Hamilton (1855 - 1929), Australian botanist
- Arthur Cole-Hamilton (1750–1810), Anglo-Irish politician
- Arthur Francis Hamilton (1880–1965), officer of the Indian Medical Service and professor of obstetrics and gynaecology
- Lord Arthur Hamilton (1883–1914), British Army officer and courtier
- Arthur Hamilton (educator) (1886–1967), writer and professor of Spanish
- Arthur Hamilton, Lord Hamilton (born 1942), Scottish judge
- Arthur Hamilton (badminton) (born 1905), Irish badminton player
- a pseudonym used by Horatio Alger
- Art Hamilton (born 1948), Arizona politician
