= Scott Hamilton =

Scott Hamilton may refer to:

- Scott Hamilton (figure skater) (born 1958), American figure skater
- Scott Hamilton (musician) (born 1954), jazz tenor saxophonist
- Scott Hamilton (rugby union) (born 1980), New Zealand rugby union footballer
- Scott Hamilton (politician) (born 1958), British Columbia, Canada
- Scotty Hamilton (1921–1976), American basketball player and coach
