= Sir Andrew Hamilton, 10th Baronet =

English cricketer

Personal information
- Full name: Andrew Caradoc Hamilton
- Born: 23 September 1953 (age 73); Ardingly, Sussex, England
- Batting: Left-handed
- Bowling: Slow left-arm orthodox

Domestic team information
- Years: Team
- 1975–1976: Oxford University

Career statistics
Competition	First-class
Matches	12
Runs scored	308
Batting average	12.83
100s/50s	–/–
Top score	45
Balls bowled	5
Wickets	0
Bowling average	–
5 wickets in innings	–
10 wickets in match	–
Best bowling	–
Catches/stumpings	2/–
- Source: Cricinfo, 5 May 2020

Sir Andrew Caradoc Hamilton, 10th Baronet (born 23 September 1953) is an English former first-class cricketer.

The son of Sir Robert Hamilton, he was born in September 1953 at Ardingly, Sussex. He was educated at Charterhouse School, before going up to St Peter's College, Oxford. While studying at Oxford, he played first-class cricket for Oxford University, making his debut against Derbyshire at Oxford in 1975. Hamilton played first-class cricket for Oxford until 1976, making twelve appearances. He scored a total of 308 runs in his twelve matches, at an average of 12.83 and a high score of 45. He succeeded his father as the 10th Baronet of the Hamilton baronets upon his death in September 2001.

Baronetage of Nova Scotia
Preceded by Robert Hamilton	Baronet (of Silvertonhill); 2001–present	Incumbent
