= Grace L. Hamilton =

American artist

- Born: Grace Wilkins Lysinger; February 19, 1894; Pittsburgh, Pennsylvania
- Died: May 17, 1992 (aged 98)
- Known for: muralist
- Movement: Regionalism

Grace L. Hamilton (1894–1992) was an American painter. A Regionalist painter, she is known for her mural in the old Stillwater, Oklahoma Post Office.

== Biography ==
Hamilton née Lysinger was born on February 19, 1894, in Pittsburgh, Pennsylvania. She attended Carnegie Mellon University graduating in 1918 with a fine arts degree. She also studied at Oklahoma State University eventually earning a master's degree in English. In 1920 She married fellow artist Donald Alan Hamilton. The couple settled in Stillwater, Oklahoma where Donald taught at Oklahoma State University–Stillwater and was head of the architecture department.

In 1962 the Fine Arts Committee of the City Planning Committee of Stillwater selected Hamilton to paint a mural of the Early Days of Payne County for the post office. The proposal was submitted to the United States Commission of Fine Arts, where it was approved in 1963. The Commission of Fine Arts had taken over public works projects from the Works Progress Administration after the end of World War II. The mural is still in existence, preserved during the renovation of the old post office.

Hamilton died on May 17, 1992.
