= Tim Hamilton =

Tim Hamilton may refer to:

- Tim Hamilton (designer), American fashion designer
- Tim Hamilton (equestrian), paralympic equestrian from Canada
- Tim Hamilton (director), Canadian filmmaker; directed first feature, Mama's Boy in 2007; Palme d'Or nomination (Truth in Advertising, 2001)
- Tim Hamilton (pole vaulter) (born 1955), American pole vaulter, 1974 NCAA runner-up for the Alabama Crimson Tide track and field team
