= Frank Hamilton =

Frank Hamilton may refer to:

- Frank Hastings Hamilton (1813–1886), American surgeon
- Frank Hamilton (rugby union) (1863–1901), South African rugby union player
- Frank Fletcher Hamilton (1921–2008), Canadian Progressive Conservative MP
- Frank Hamilton (American musician) (born 1934), American folk musician and co-founder of Chicago's Old Town School of Folk Music
- Frank Hamilton (British singer) (born 1985), English singer, songwriter and producer

== See also ==
- Francis Hamilton (disambiguation)
