= Jane Hamilton (disambiguation) =

Jane Hamilton (born 1957) is an American novelist.

Jane Hamilton may also refer to:

- Jane Hamilton (actress) (1915–2004), American film actress
- Jane Hamilton (British noblewoman) (died 1753), British noblewoman
- Jane Eaton Hamilton (born 1954), Canadian short story writer, poet and photographer
- Jane Soley Hamilton (1805–1897), Canadian pioneer midwife
- Veronica Hart (Jane Esther Hamilton, born 1956), American former pornographic actress
- Jane Hamilton-Merritt American photojournalist
