= Duncan Hamilton =

Duncan Hamilton may refer to:

- Duncan Hamilton (politician) (born 1973), former Scottish National Party MSP
- Duncan Hamilton (racing driver) (1920–1994), winner of Le Mans 24 hours race
- Duncan Hamilton (journalist), winner of the 2007 William Hill Sports Book of the Year
- Duncan Hamilton (runner), American track and field athlete
