= Baron Hamilton =

Baron Hamilton may refer to several peerage titles.

- Baron Hamilton of Strabane in the County of Tyrone (1617)
- Baron Hamilton of Glenawly (1660)
- Baron Hamilton of Stackallen in the County of Meath (1715)
- Baron Hamilton of Hameldon in the County of Leicester (1776)
- Baron Hamilton of Wishaw in the County of Lanark (1831)
- Baron Hamilton of Dalzell in the county of Lanark (1886)
- Baron Hamilton of Epsom in the County of Devon (2005)
- Baron Hamilton of Hageby in Sweden
