= Diana Hamilton =

Diana Hamilton may refer to:

- Diana Hamilton (writer) (died 2009), British writer of romance novels
- Diana Hamilton (actress), British stage actress and playwright
- Diana Hamilton (musician), Ghanaian gospel musician

== See also ==
- Diane Hamilton, American mining heiress and folksong patron
- Diane Musho Hamilton, American Zen teacher
- Dianne Hamilton, member of the New Mexico House of Representatives
