= Carl Hamilton =

Carl or Karl Hamilton may refer to:

- Carl B. Hamilton (born 1946), Swedish count, economist and politician
- Carl Hamilton (fictional character), fictional secret agent created by Jan Guillou
- Carl L. Hamilton (1888–1946), American businessman
- Karl Didrik Hamilton, on the list of governors of Örebro County
- Karl Wilhelm de Hamilton, Brussels-born painter
- Carl Hamilton (American football), New Mexico Lobos football coach
- Carl Hamilton (Governor) on List of governors of Östergötland County
- Carl Hamilton, candidate in the 1977 Ontario general election
