= Curtis Hamilton =

Curtis Hamilton is the name of:

- Curtis Hamilton (American football) (born 1985)
- Curtis Hamilton (ice hockey) (born 1991)
