= Daniel W. Hamilton (lawyer) =

American lawyer

Daniel W. Hamilton is an American lawyer, formerly Dean and Richard J. Morgan Professor of Law at William S. Boyd School of Law, University of Nevada, Las Vegas. His doctorate is in American legal history (2003, Harvard University); he was a Golieb Fellow in Legal History at New York University School of Law (2003-04 academic year); he received his J.D. from George Washington University and his B.A. from Oberlin College.
