= Patrick Hamilton =

Patrick Hamilton may refer to:

- Patrick Hamilton of Kincavil (died 1520), Scottish nobleman
- Patrick Hamilton (martyr) (1504–1528), Scottish Protestant reformer and son of the above
- Patrick Hamilton (poet) (1575–1658), Church of Scotland minister and poet
- Patrick Hamilton (writer) (1904–1962), novelist and playwright
- Patrick Omolade Hamilton, Sierra Leone judge
