= Ugo Mozie =

American fashion designer

Ugo Mozie is a Nigerian creative executive. In 2009, at 18, he debuted his first fashion line, Aston Mozie, and in 2015 he released his luxury hat line.

Mozie's clientele has included Justin Bieber, Celine Dion, Travis Scott, Beyonce, and J. Balvin. In 2014, Ugo was appointed the U.S. P.R. director to designer Vivienne Westwood.

Mozie currently lives in Los Angeles, and is working to develop the fashion industry in Africa. His most recent venture, Mosaic Perfume, is a North and West African-based luxury perfume that aims to redefine the sector.
