= Hamilton Robinson (South Carolina politician) =

South Carolina American politician

Member of the South Carolina Senate
- In office 1882–1884
- Constituency: Beaufort County

Personal details
- Died: April 10, 1884 South Carolina, U.S.
- Party: Democratic
- Occupation: Legislator

Military service
- Unit: 33rd United States Colored Infantry Regiment
- Battles/wars: American Civil War

Hamilton Robinson (died April 10, 1884) was a legislator who served in the South Carolina Senate post Reconstruction.

He was native to Beaufort County, South Carolina. He fought and was wounded in the American Civil War serving in the 33rd United States Colored Infantry Regiment. He had a son Stepney Robinson who was a well known doctor on Saint Helena Island.

He was made a warden of Beaufort January 1881.

Robinson was elected to serve in the South Carolina Senate from 1882 until 1884 representing Beaufort County. He was elected as a Democrat.

He died April 10, 1884, whilst still in office.

== See also ==
- African American officeholders from the end of the Civil War until before 1900
