= Andrew Hamilton (canoeist) =

British canoeist

Andy Hamilton
- Hamilton on Townfalls Llangollen
- Born: Andrew Stewart Hamilton

Andrew Hamilton is a British canoeist based in Nottingham, England. He competed in slalom canoeing C1 from the mid-1990s to the mid-2000s and whitewater racing, single canoe (C1) and double canoe (C2) for Great Britain between 2000 and 2010.

== Competition ==
His best international result in Slalom canoeing was 8th place in the Ocoee Pre-World Championships in 2000. His results were:

- White Water World Championships: 2004 Garmisch Germany, 2006 Karlovy Vary, 2008 Ivrea, Italy, 2014 Valencia
- 2014 Valencia, Italy World Championships
- World Masters Cup – White Water Racing – 2nd place with Paul Anderson in C2 canoe
- World Police and Fire Games 2013, Belfast, Northern Ireland: Men’s doubles K2 1000m sprint - 1st place, Men’s singles K1 1000m sprint – 2nd place, Men’s singles K1 500m sprint – 2nd place. Men’s singles K1 200m sprint – 2nd place, Surf kayaking – 1st Place
