= Bryan Willis Hamilton =

American music producer, composer, writer, singer, rapper, poet

Bryan Hamilton
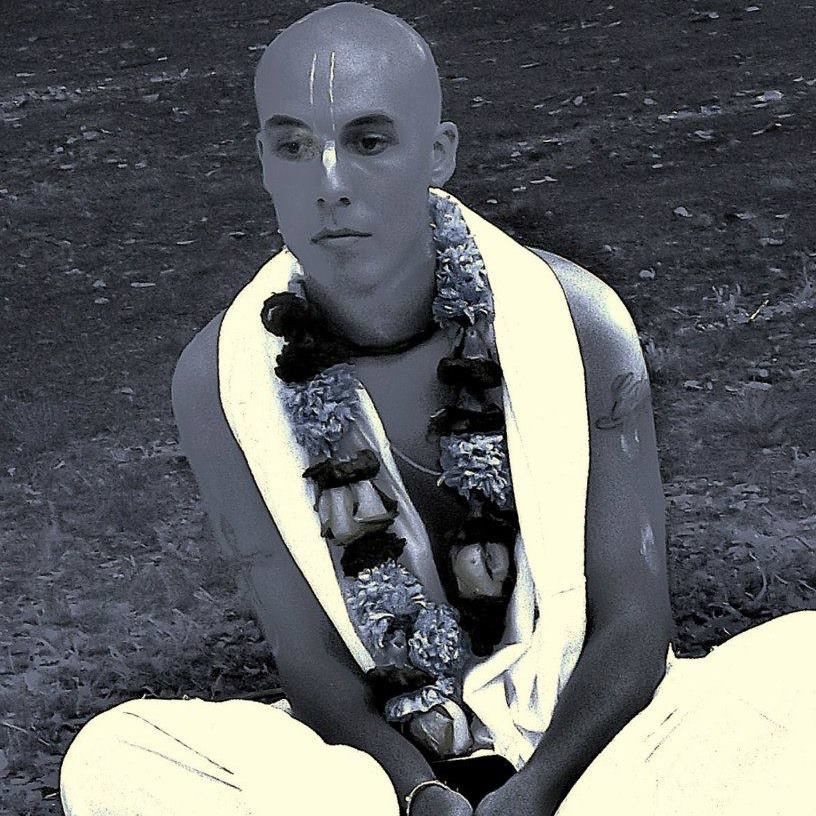
- Bhagavan Narada Das initiation ceremony in 2012

Background information
- Also known as: Bhagavan Narada Das, Aliens WITH Halos
- Born: Bryan Hamilton; December 21, 1983 (age 42); Corpus Christi, Texas, United States
- Occupations: Fulltime Servant Leader at Krishna Temple of San Antonio, Music Producer
- Instruments: Synthesizers, sampling, drum machines, bass guitar, vocals
- Website: www.alienswithhalos.com

Bryan Hamilton (born September 21, 1983) is an American spiritual student and teacher in the Krishna Consciousness Movement. He is manager of the Krishna Temple of San Antonio and initiated as a disciple of Guru Prasad Swami (ISKCON). Bryan was given the spiritual name of Bhagavan Narada Das in late 2012. He is also a music producer and artist.

== Career ==
Born in Corpus Christi, Texas. Bryan began studying music production at Del Mar College in 2005. His producing career began in 2007 after moving to San Antonio.

In 2008 Hamilton along with San Antonio musicians/artists Jeff Palacios and Marc Contreras (Heavenly Junkie) under the name of Gunshot Hopes began recording a series of songs that would end up on Hamilton's 2011 compilation entitledWelcome To Dreamland.

In February 2009 the trio Gunshot Hopes was backed by a variety of local talent played in what would be their only live performance with a full band.

After becoming severely ill for the year of 2009 and unable to write music, in 2011 Hamilton started studying Krishna Consciousness. Soon after he started studying the teachings of Bhaktivedanta Swami Srila Prabhupada under Guru Prasad Swami.

In 2010 Bryan Hamilton released a 70-minute mix entitled LiBerated HaSbeens, with B-sides and early recordings.

In 2011 Bryan released "Dirt Rocks Vol.1".

In March 2011 he released a spiritual mix entitled "The Absolute Truth" made by artists and musicians who study and practice Krishna Consciousness in San Antonio. In November he and Mexico City rapper Karim Zomar released a 12 track album entitled Bring Us Peace.

Also in November 2011 Hamilton produced and released an album entitled "Welcome To Dreamland". The San Antonio Current rated the album as the #2 of album of 2011. Stating: " Being a spirit and having a body is the great theme of this record, a blood-letting of the soul."

Bryan Hamilton took formal initiation into the Krishna Consciousness movement in 2012 and received the spiritual name Bhagavan Narada Das. In 2015 while visiting Vrindavan during the holy month of Kartik, Bhagavan Narada Das received his 2nd initiation on the disappearance day of AC Bhaktivedanta Swami Prabhupada.

In 2013 Hamilton released a 5 song remix EP of Carla Morrison songs. He followed up in 2014 with a collaborative and yet short lived effort with local MC's Vocab and Karim Zomar called "Blend Phonetics".

In 2015 Bhagavan Narada Das helped open the Krishna Temple of San Antonio. The temple is very active currently with Sunday and Wednesday Meditations and meet ups.

In 2016 Hamilton released an album with local folk singer Heavenly Junkie. A remix of folk tunes backed with futuristic beats and synths.

In June 2019 Bhagavan Narada Das released a film entitled "Circus of the Self" and corresponding album under his alias "Aliens WITH Halos". The album is currently available on itunes, Tidal, Spotify and all other major streaming platforms.

== Discography ==
- LiBerated HaSbeens (2010) (mixtape)
- Dirt Rocks Vol.1 (2011) (instrumental album)
- The Absolute Truth (2011) (mixtape)
- Welcome To Dreamland (2011)
- Carla Morrison Remixed Ep (2013) (mixtape)
- Transitions (2014) (feat. Blend Phonetics)
- "At the Time of Death" (2016) (Heavenly Junkie and Bryan Hamtilton)
- Aliens WITH Halos LP (2019)

== Filmography ==
- Circus of the Self (2019)
