= Reginald Hamilton =

Reginald Hamilton may refer to:

- Reg Hamilton (1914–1991), Canadian ice hockey player
- Reggie Hamilton (born 1989), American basketball player
