= Anthony Hamilton (racing manager) =

British racing manager and motorsport advocate (born 1960)

Anthony Hamilton (born 31 May 1960) is a British racing manager and motorsport advocate, and is the father and former manager of seven-time Formula 1 World Champion Lewis Hamilton. Born in the United Kingdom to Grenadian parents, Anthony played a pivotal role in nurturing Lewis's racing career, working multiple jobs to fund his son's karting and junior racing endeavours. Since 2023, he has served as an advisor to the Fédération Internationale de l'Automobile (FIA), contributing to its Young Driver Development Pathway.

== Early life ==
=== Paul di Resta's manager ===
In 2010, Paul di Resta and Hamilton were working together, with Hamilton managing di Resta's career as he transitioned from DTM to Formula 1, joining Force India. However, their professional relationship ended acrimoniously in 2012, leading to a legal dispute over a sponsorship deal and breach of contract. They eventually settled the case out of court in early 2014.

=== HybridV10 motorsport platform ===
In early 2026, Hamilton announced the intent to set up a new "motorsport festival ecosystem", called HybridV10, with a sub-division of HybridV8 Single Seater Racing. The intent behind this platform is to create an easier to access single seater championship, without involvement from the FIA. Hamilton's intent is for the first event to be in 2028/29, spending the rest of 2026 and all of 2027 to build frameworks, investment and interest.
