= Joda Hamilton =

Executed American mass murderer

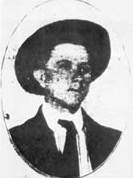
- Born: Joseph Hamilton; December 7, 1885; Texas County, Missouri, U.S.
- Died: December 21, 1906 (aged 21); Texas County Courthouse, Houston, Missouri, U.S.
- Other names: Jody Hamilton; Jodie Hamilton
- Status: Executed by hanging
- Motive: Rage; Argument over a saddle
- Conviction: First degree murder
- Penalty: Death

Details
- Date: October 12, 1906
- Country: United States
- Location: Licking, Missouri
- Targets: His employer and his family
- Killed: 5 (including a pregnant woman)
- Weapons: Shotgun; Knife; Axe

Joseph "Joda" Hamilton (December 7, 1885 – December 21, 1906) was an American mass murderer who was executed in Missouri. On October 12, 1906, he murdered five members of the same family, including three young children, during an argument over a horse saddle. After his arrest, Hamilton pleaded guilty and was sentenced to death. Dismissing any offers for leniency, Hamilton was executed in December of that year.

== Early life ==
Hamilton was the youngest of four children. His father, James Buchanan Hamilton, was a very religious Christian preacher who always carried a Bible. He was strict with his children, refusing to let them drink or square dance. The children were only allowed to sing hymns. James Hamilton was also known to have a bad temper.

Hamilton was known to have feared and respected his father. His mother died when he was 5 years old. Two years later, he was kicked in the head by a mule, giving him a permanent scar over his left eye. Several years later, Hamilton was taking care of mules when one kicked him in the chest, knocking him unconscious. When he was 12, a tree fell on him and almost broke his neck.

Hamilton was known as an ordinary person, albeit with occasional bursts of temper. He once beat a man so badly in a fight that it took the man three days to recover. It is suspected that Hamilton's anger was due to his head injuries.

In 1902, James Hamilton remarried and the family set off for Plains, Kansas. Hamilton eventually returned to Missouri by himself, where he started working for Carnell "Carney" Parsons, a sharecropper.

When Hamilton was 20, he fell in love with a 16-year-old girl named Mae Thompson, who he'd met shortly before he left for Kansas. The two eventually got engaged. Hamilton planned to use the money he earned from Carney to settle down and have a family.

The Parson family and Hamilton initially got along. He had a particularly good relationship with Carney's three young sons. However, their relationship worsened when Hamilton found a horse and its saddle, and never tried to find the owner. According to Hamilton, Carney started to tell lies about him to Mae Thompson.

== Murders ==
On October 12, 1906, Carney asked Hamilton if he was willing to trade the saddle he stole for $25 and a single-barreled shotgun. Hamilton refused. Carney pressured Hamilton, saying he knew it was stolen and would report the theft to the local sheriff. Hamilton offered the saddle for the shotgun and $35, but Parsons bargained him down to the initial offer with threats. The deal was reluctantly agreed upon by Hamilton, and the Parson family departed.

As he thought about the trade, Hamilton became increasingly angry, believing he had been cheated. He eventually took the shotgun and pursued the Parsons. When Hamilton caught up with them, he and Carney got into an argument. Afterward, Carney continued down the road. Hamilton continued to pursue them. By the time Hamilton reached Carney once more, he had lost his temper. The two men got into a fight in front of Carney's family. Realizing that Hamilton wasn't going to stop, Carney pulled out a knife. Hamilton then used his shotgun on him, hitting Carney in the leg. The shotgun broke after he fired it. The shotgun broke into three pieces afterward, and Hamilton fatally struck Carney in the head with the barrel. When Minnie tried to stop him, he struck her as well. She was badly injured but did not die.

The Parsons' children were the next victims, crying in confusion and fear. Hamilton struck each of them with the barrel and cut their throats with the knife Carney had pulled on him. He hesitated before killing the youngest child, but then killed him as well. Hamilton realized that Minnie was still alive when she grabbed his leg, so he murdered her with an axe.

== Arrest and guilty plea ==
After the murders, Hamilton stole a razor, spectacles, $25, and a gold watch from Carney's pockets. He then loaded the bodies into the wagon and hid them in a river, before fleeing with one of the Parson family's mules. Afterward, Hamilton went to church with Mae. When the bodies were discovered and the news spread to the congregation, he made an excuse to leave and fled to Houston, Missouri. Hamilton planned to return to Kansas to kill his father. However, a local recognized the mule he had as belonging to the Parsons and reported him. Hamilton was arrested after local sheriffs discovered Carney's belongings in his pockets. He was sent to the Houston County Jail.

An angry crowd gathered outside the jail, and Hamilton became terrified of being lynched. He tried to commit suicide on two separate occasions but was stopped both times. The sheriff had 20 armed deputies guard the jail in order to deter the mob. Under the cover of a dark early morning, the police transported Hamilton to Carthage, Missouri to protect him from the mob. A lynch mob nearly caught Hamilton at the local jail in Springfield, which he had been transported from a few hours earlier. On October 21, 1906, Hamilton was returned to Houston to stand trial. He confessed, and on November 12, pleaded guilty to first degree murder. However, the judge impaneled a jury for a trial. Under Missouri law at the time, nobody who confessed to a capital crime could be executed without a trial, and the judge was reluctant to take full responsibility for sparing the life of a mass murderer.

During his trial, the prosecutor asked Hamilton if he was guilty. He replied that he was and said he committed the murders in anger. When one of the jurors asked Hamilton whether he had planned the murders, Hamilton said he had not and that he lost control. He said he was guilty and was willing to accept his fate.

Hamilton's attorney claimed that his client had acted under temporary insanity. He called Hamilton's brother to the stand and asked him about the head injuries he suffered as a child. A doctor examined Hamilton's head to check if the kick resulted in brain pressure which might have resulted in him being insane. Ultimately, the doctor concluded that Hamilton was sane. The jury found him guilty of first degree murder in less than an hour. Hamilton faced a mandatory death sentence.

Hamilton was asked if he had a statement, and he said, "I am sorry I committed the crime, but am ready to die." The judge then sentenced him to death, with an execution date set for December 21, 1906, exactly two weeks after Hamilton's 21st birthday.

Many people, including some who did not know him, came to visit Hamilton in his cell. They visited out of sympathy or curiosity about whether Hamilton was indeed insane. James Hamilton petitioned Governor Joseph W. Folk to stay the execution, claiming he was insane. However, on December 15, Folk declined to grant a stay. From that point, Hamilton became curious about how his execution would work. He was allowed to inspect every component of the gallows at the Houston County Courthouse, and test the trap door.

== Execution ==
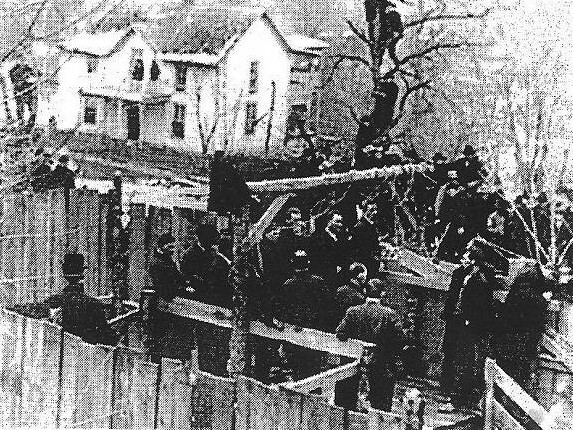
Hamilton's execution

The day of the execution was cold and cloudy. Approximately 3000 onlookers, including Mae Thompson and her family, came to watch the hanging, the first (and the last) hanging in Texas County. A stockade was set up to prevent them from getting too close. Hamilton had slept well the night before his execution and seemed cheerful on the day of his execution, eating a large final breakfast. He left the jail at 10:42 AM and was led to the gallows. He calmly ascended the scaffold and stood between two preachers. The crowd started singing "Jesus, Lover of My Soul". Hamilton joined in, leading him to gain sympathy among many in the crowd.

Asked if he had any last words, Hamilton sang a song:

"Companions, draw nigh, they say I must die,

Early the summons has come from on high;

The way is so dark and yet I must go,

O, that such sorrow you never may know.

"Ah, can you not bow and pray with me now?

Sad the regret, we have never learned how

To come before Him, who only can save,

Leading in triumph thro' death and the grave.

"(Chorus) Only a prayer, only a tear,

O, if sister and mother were here;

Only a song, 'twill comfort and cheer,

Only a word from that Book so dear."

Afterwards, Hamilton made a lengthy statement telling young people to trust in God and treat their parents with respect. He then asked God for mercy. By the time Hamilton finished, the crowd had gone silent and a few women started crying. A church elder said a prayer for him. Afterward, Hamilton said "Now, dear friends, as my sentence has come, I hope to meet all you friends standing around here today in a better world. Try to be faithful and meet God in peace, and hope to meet in the better world." As the sheriff bound his arms and legs, Hamilton continued to ask God for mercy. His final words before the trapdoor was sprung open at 11:02 AM were "Lord, have mercy on me, on my soul."

However, Hamilton did not die, as the knot of the noose came out. Hamilton fell down, injured and stunned, but still conscious. Most of the crowd was in shock, and Mae fainted. The sheriff started to work tying another knot. Hamilton, lying on the ground, continued to ask God for mercy. Some people suspected that the rope had been tampered with. A midwife yelled to Hamilton "That one's for the baby!"

After a new noose was made, Hamilton was carried up the gallows. The trap was sprung once more at 11:04 AM. This time the knot held, breaking Hamilton's neck, and he was pronounced dead 13 minutes later. James Hamilton took his son's remains and buried him in the Allen Cemetery, next to his mother.
