= Jo Hamilton =

Jo Hamilton may refer to:

- Jo Hamilton (subpostmaster) British subpostmaster and justice campaigner
- Jo Hamilton (interior designer) British interior designer
- Jo Hamilton (musician) British musician
- Jo Hamilton (politician) (1827–1904) former California Attorney General

== See also ==
- Joseph Hamilton (disambiguation)
- Hamilton (surname)
