= Wendy Hamilton =

- Wendy J. Hamilton, former president of Mothers Against Drunk Driving
- Wendy Hamilton (politician), 2022 candidate for District of Columbia's at-large congressional district
- Wendy Hamilton (model), model
