= Douglas Hamilton (disambiguation) =

Douglas Hamilton was a British Indian Army officer.

Douglas Hamilton may also refer to:

- Douglas Hamilton, 8th Duke of Hamilton (1756–1799), Scottish peer
- Douglas Hamilton (journalist) (1947–2012), Canadian/British Reuters foreign correspondent
- Dougie Hamilton (born 1993), Canadian ice hockey defenseman

== See also ==
- Doug Hamilton (disambiguation)
- Douglas Douglas-Hamilton (disambiguation)
- Douglas-Hamilton, a British aristocratic surname
