= Gavin Hamilton =

Gavin Hamilton may refer to:

- Gavin Hamilton (archbishop of St Andrews) (died 1571), archbishop of St Andrews
- Gavin Hamilton (bishop of Galloway) (1561–1612), bishop of Galloway
- Gavin Hamilton (artist) (1723–1798), Scottish artist
- Gavin Hamilton (lawyer) (1751–1805), friend of Robert Burns
- Gavin Hamilton, 2nd Baron Hamilton of Dalzell (1872–1952), British politician
- Gavin Hamilton (British Army officer) (1953–1982), SAS officer killed in Falklands War
- Gavin Hamilton (cricketer) (born 1974), Scottish cricketer

== See also ==
- Gawen Hamilton (1698–1737), artist
