= Don Hamilton =

Don Hamilton may refer to:

- Don Hamilton (American football), American football quarterback, baseball player and football referee
- Don Hamilton (sport shooter), American sports shooter
- Don Hamilton (lacrosse), Canadian box lacrosse goaltender and ice hockey goaltender

== See also ==
- Donald Hamilton, American writer
- Donald Cameron Hamilton, New Zealand rugby union player
- Don H. Barden (Don Hamilton Barden), American casino executive
