= Lee Hamilton (disambiguation) =

Lee Hamilton (1931–2026) was an American politician from Indiana.

Lee Hamilton may also refer to:

- Lee Hamilton (sports), American sportscaster and radio talk show host
- Eugene Lee-Hamilton (1845–1907), English poet

== See also ==
- Leo Richard Hamilton (1927–2010), Wisconsin politician
