= Nigel Hamilton =

Nigel Hamilton may refer to:

- Nigel Hamilton (civil servant), former head of the Northern Ireland Civil Service
- Nigel Hamilton (author) (born 1944), British-born biographer, academic, and broadcaster
