= Paul Hamilton =

Paul Hamilton may refer to:

- Paul Hamilton (representative) (1695–1739), grandfather of the below, South Carolina representative to the House of Commons in the 1720s
- Paul Hamilton (politician) (1762–1816), United States Secretary of the Navy and governor of South Carolina, served as an officer in the American Revolution
  - USS Paul Hamilton (DDG-60), a 1993 Arleigh Burke-class destroyer in the United States Navy
  - USS Paul Hamilton (DD-590), a Fletcher-class destroyer in the United States Navy
  - USS Paul Hamilton (DD-307), a Clemson-class destroyer in the United States Navy
  - SS Paul Hamilton, a 1942 Liberty ship built in the United States during World War II
- Paul Hamilton (soccer) (born 1988), Canadian soccer player
- Paul Hamilton (footballer, born 1941) (1941–2017), Nigerian footballer and manager
- Paul Hamilton (Australian footballer) (born 1967), former Australian rules footballer
- Paul Hamilton (American football) (born 1958), American football coach and former player
- Paul Hamilton (architect), British architect
