= Francis Hamilton =

Francis Hamilton may refer to:

- Sir Francis Hamilton, 1st Baronet, of Killock, Irish landowner and politician
- Francis Buchanan-Hamilton (1762–1829), later known as Francis Hamilton, Scottish physician and naturalist
- Francis Alvin George Hamilton, Canadian politician usually known as Alvin Hamilton
- Sir Francis Hamilton, 3rd Baronet (c. 1637–1714)

== See also ==
- Frank Hamilton (disambiguation)
- Francis Hamilton Wedgwood of Wedgwood Pottery
