= Edward Hamilton (homeopath) =

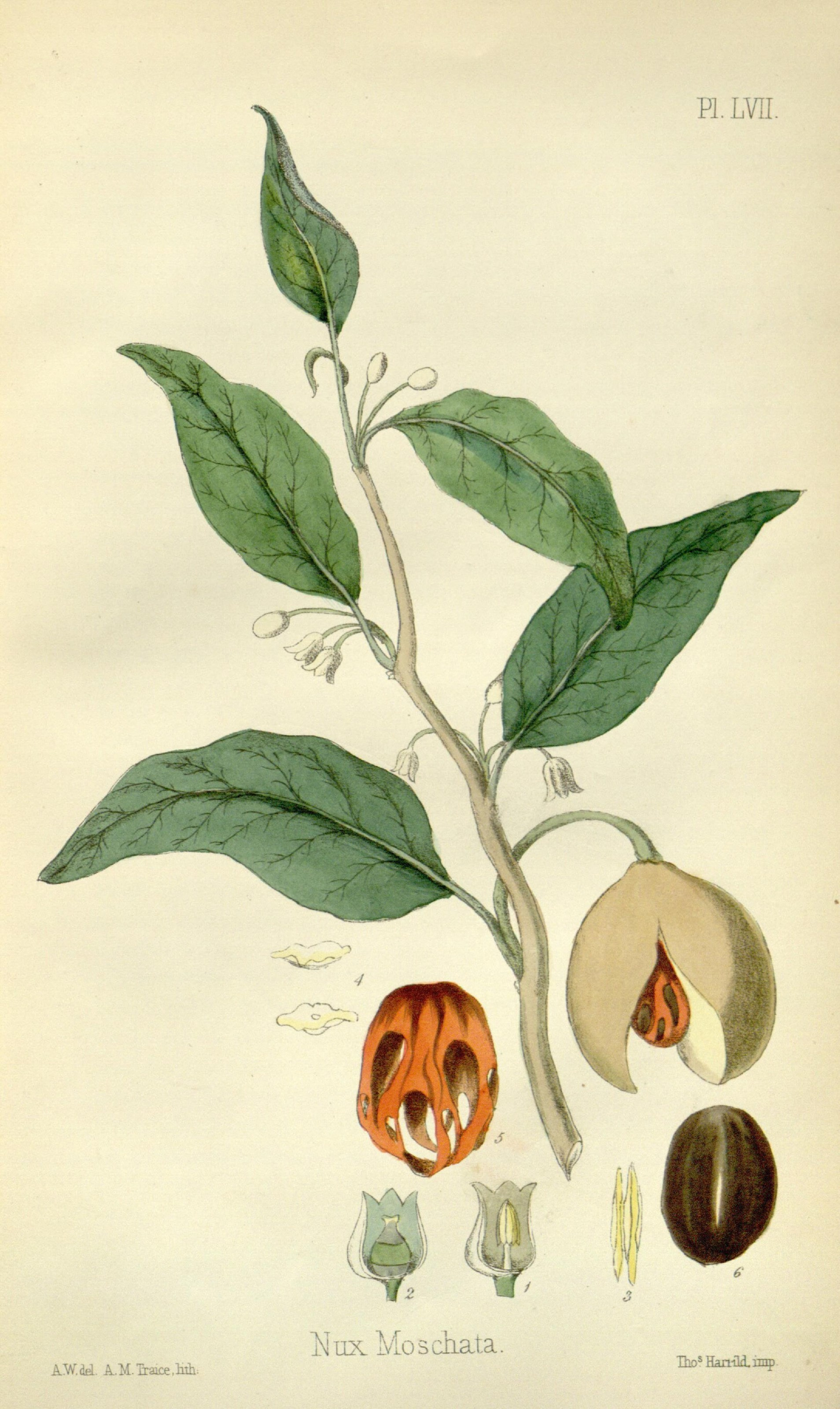
Myristica fragrans

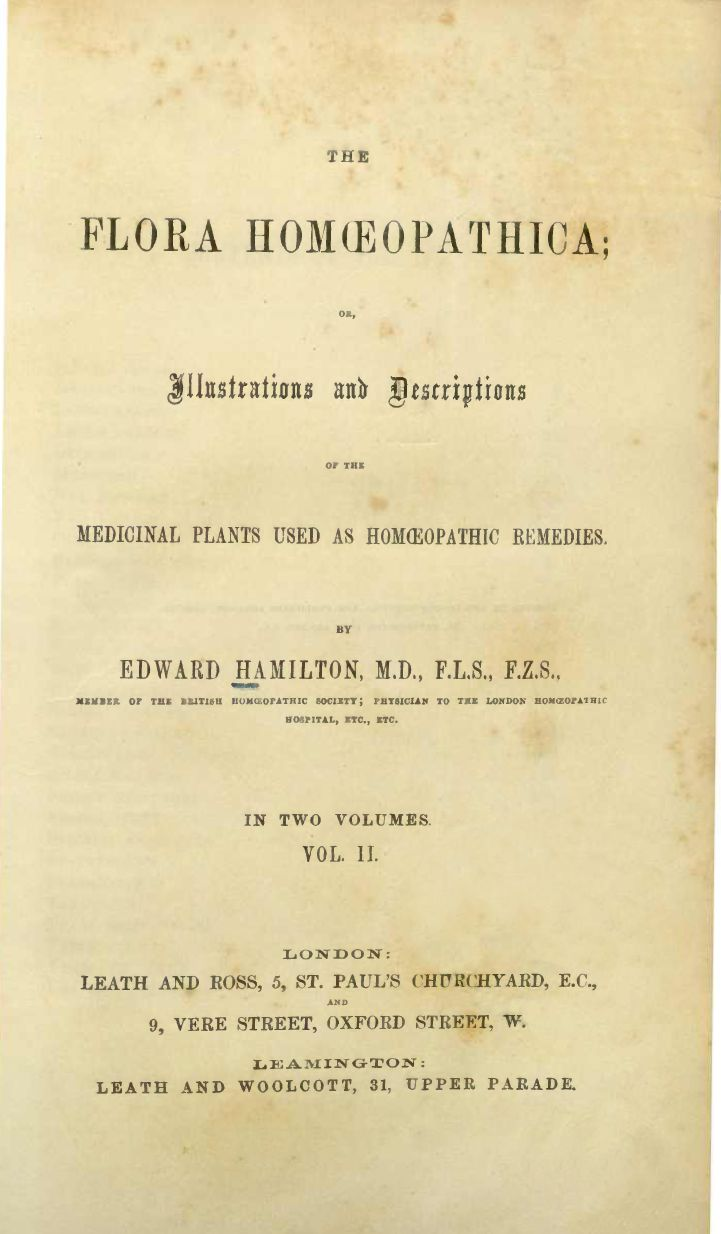

Edward Hamilton (1815 – 3 August 1903) was an English physician who practiced homeopathy, and is noted for his 1852–53 two-volume work The Flora Homoeopathica with colour illustrations and descriptions of the medicinal plants then used in homoeopathic remedies.

== Career ==
In 1844, together with John Yate Lee, John Chapman and others, Hamilton founded the Bank of Deposit and National Assurance and Investment Association, and played a role in the 1851 founding of the London Homeopathic Hospital at 32 Golden Square.

From 1851 Hamilton served on the committee of the Association for the Protection of Homeopathic Students and Practitioners, and was chairman of the 2nd Annual Congress of British Homeopathic Practitioners. An 1866 report by William Coutts Keppel, also known as Viscount Bury, on the treatment of Rinderpest by homeopathy, noted that the Dutch had enjoyed great success, leading to Hamilton's visiting the Netherlands and Belgium to investigate the work of Jules Gaudy and E Seutin. As a result of these studies, John Spencer-Churchill, 7th Duke of Marlborough, was appointed Chairman of the Association for the Trial of Preventative and Curative Treatment in the Cattle Plague by the Homeopathic Method, and headed a task force made up of Edward Hamilton, George Lennox Moore, James Moore and Alfred Crosby Pope. A detailed account of these trials was drawn up by George Lennox Moore. In this report he refuted an article published in The Lancet in which the homeopathic approach to the cattle plague was disparaged and William Coutts Keppel accused of ‘being completely misinformed on this matter‘. The Times published an article in which it wished the homeopathic team well, observing that the allopathic community would probably prefer that all the cattle die rather than have the homeopathic approach proved efficacious.

Hamilton became Physician to the London Homeopathic Hospital, a Fellow of the Linnean Society and Zoological Society. He was both a member and treasurer of the British Homeopathic Society which later became the Faculty of Homeopathy. He worked at the Westminster and Lambeth Homeopathic Dispensary in 1844 in the company of Joseph Laurie and William Henry Mayne. He was a colleague of Marmaduke Blake Sampson, Chairman of the British Homeopathic Association.

Hamilton's patients included notables such as Charles II, Duke of Parma (then Duke of Lucca), the composer Gabriel Faure, the singers Christina Nilsson, Giorgio Ronconi. Italo Gardoni, Antonio Cotogni, Thérèse Tietjens and Adelina Patti. He was a student of Frederic Hervey Foster Quin, the first President of the British Homeopathic Society, lodging with him from 1834 to 1839, and becoming his executor on his death.

== The Flora Homoeopathica ==
In this materia medica, Hamilton detailed the symptoms of poisoning, records of successful use of the plant, and a description of its homeopathic uses. The work was reprinted by the Faculty of Homeopathy in 1981.

== Works ==
- Comparative Results of the Homeopathic and Allopathic Treatment of Asiatic Cholera
- A Short History of Cholera
- The Flora Homoeopathica
- A Guide to the Practice of Homeopathy
- A Memoir of Frederick Hervey Foster Quin
