= Gerald Hamilton (disambiguation) =

Gerald Hamilton (1890–1970) was an Irish memoirist, critic, and internationalist.

Gerald Hamilton may also refer to:

- Gerald Hamilton (architect) (1923–1999), architect in Vancouver, British Columbia
- Gerald Hamilton, singer for The Crows
- Gerald Hamilton, president of Klamath Community College

== See also ==
- Gerald Edwin Hamilton Barrett-Hamilton (1871–1914), British natural historian
