= Ray Hamilton =

Ray or Raymond Hamilton may refer to:

== Sports ==
- Ray Hamilton (defensive tackle) (born 1951), American football player and coach
- Ray Hamilton (defensive end) (1916–1995), American football player
- Ray Hamilton (tight end) (born 1992), American football player
- Raymond Hamilton (soccer), American soccer player

== Others ==
- Raymond Hamilton (1913–1935), American gangster
- Raymond Hamilton (politician) (1909–1975), Australian politician

== See also ==
- Billy Ray Hamilton (died 2007), American murderer
- Robert Ray Hamilton (1851–1890), American politician
