= Mary Hamilton (disambiguation) =

"Mary Hamilton" is a song.

Mary Hamilton may also refer to:

== People ==
- Mary Hamilton (lady-in-waiting) (died 1719), Scottish lady-in-waiting to Empress Catherine I of Russia and a royal mistress of Emperor Peter the Great, executed for several crimes
- Mary Hamilton, also known as Charles Hamilton (female husband) (born c. 1721–1724), a woman who married another woman while pretending to be a man
- Lady Mary Hamilton (1736–1821), Scottish novelist
- Mary Riter Hamilton (1873–1954), Canadian World War I painter
- Mary Hamilton, Duchess of Abercorn (1848–1929), English aristocrat
- Mary Christian Dundas Hamilton (1850–1943), Scottish writer and poet
- Mary Hamilton (politician) (1882–1966), Scottish politician
- Mary Louise Hamilton, Duchess of Montrose (1884–1957), Scottish noblewoman
- Mary Barbara Hamilton (1901–2000), pen name Barbara Cartland, English author best known for her romance novels
- Mary Hamilton (activist) (1935–2002), American activist in the Civil Rights Movement
- Mary Lou Graham Hamilton (1936–2024), American baseball pitcher in the All-American Girls Professional Baseball League
- Mary Hamilton (equestrian) (born 1954), New Zealand equestrian

== Fictional characters ==
- Mary Hamilton (Arrowverse), in the Arrowverse franchise

== See also ==
- Mary Hamilton Frye (1890–1951), American stained glass artist and children's book illustrator
- Lady Mary Douglas-Hamilton (1850–1922), hereditary princess of Monaco
