= Barbara Hamilton =

Barbara Hamilton is the name of:

- Barbara Hamilton (courtier) (died 1558), Scottish aristocrat
- Barbara Hamilton (actress) (1926–1996), Canadian actress
- Barbara Hamilton (drag racer) (1941–2020), American drag racer
- Barbara Hamilton (judge), judge in Manitoba, Canada
- Barbara Hamilton, 14th Baroness Dudley (1907–2002), British noblewoman
