= Russ Hamilton =

Russ or Russell Hamilton may refer to:

- Russell Hamilton McBean (1894–1963), English naval officer in First World War
- Russ Hamilton (singer) (1932–2008), English songwriter and performer
- Russ Hamilton (poker player) (born 1948 or 1949), American champion in 1994 World Series of Poker
- Russell Hamilton (singer-songwriter) (born 1969), American singer-songwriter; stage name "Russell"
- Russell G. Hamilton (1934–2016), American author
