= Clayton Hamilton =

Clayton Hamilton may refer to:

- Clayton Hamilton (critic) (1881–1946), American drama critic
- Clayton Hamilton (baseball) (born 1982), American pitcher

== See also ==
- Clayton-Hamilton Jazz Orchestra
