= Keith N. Hamilton =

Chair of the Utah Board of Pardons and Paroles

Keith N. Hamilton is an American writer who was formerly chair of the Utah Board of Pardons and Parole. In that capacity he was the first African American to serve in the Cabinet of the State of Utah.

== Life ==
Hamilton was born in Norfolk, Virginia. His grandfather was a Baptist minister. He was raised primarily in New Jersey and North Carolina. His grandfather was a Southern Baptist preacher.

Hamilton joined the Church of Jesus Christ of Latter-day Saints in 1980 while a student at North Carolina State University. He ultimately graduated from the school with a BA in political science and a concentration in criminal justice. He served as a missionary in Puerto Rico and Barbados. After his missionary service, he earned a J.D. degree from the J. Reuben Clark Law School of Brigham Young University, being the first African American to graduate from that institution.

After graduating, Hamilton served for several years in the United States Navy in the Judge Advocate General's Corps. He has worked in administrative positions at Brigham Young University and the University of Massachusetts Amherst.

Hamilton served from 1995 to 2003 and 2005 to 2009 on the Utah Board of Pardons and Parole, including as chair from March 2006 until May 2007, a position which made him a member of the Utah Governor's Cabinet.

He has written an autobiography entitled Last Laborer: Thoughts and Reflections of a Black Mormon. From 2011 to 2014 he was an adjunct professor of law at the J. Reuben Clark Law School and has served as a columnist for the Deseret News.

He very briefly spent part of his time teaching and coaching football at Summit Academy High School in Bluffdale, Utah.

In the LDS Church Hamilton has served in multiple positions including serving as a bishop in the San Francisco California Stake during the time Quentin L. Cook was president of that stake.

Hamilton currently works with Pace Johnson Law Group, a Salt Lake City, Utah-based law firm.
