= Andrew Hamilton (footballer, born 1882) =

Scottish footballer

Personal information
- Full name: Andrew Hamilton
- Date of birth: 10 June 1882
- Place of birth: Aberdeen, Scotland
- Date of death: 20 July 1915 (aged 33)
- Place of death: West Flanders, Belgium
- Position(s): Forward

Senior career*
Years	Team	Apps	(Gls)
- Favourites
–1905	Harp		
1905–1906	Aberdeen	1	(0)
- *Club domestic league appearances and goals

Andrew Hamilton (10 June 1882 – 20 July 1915) was a Scottish professional footballer who made one appearance as a forward in the Scottish League for Aberdeen. He also made 15 appearances for the club in the Northern and East of Scotland Leagues.

== Personal life ==
Hamilton served as a private in the Gordon Highlanders during the First World War. He was killed in West Flanders, Belgium on 20 July 1915, after having only arrived on the Western Front two months earlier. Hamilton is commemorated on the Menin Gate.

== Career statistics ==
Appearances and goals by club, season and competition
Club	Season	League			Scottish Cup		Total	
Club	Season	Division	Apps	Goals	Apps	Goals	Apps	Goals
Aberdeen	1905–06	Scottish First Division	1	0	0	0	1	0
Career total			1	0	0	0	1	0

== Honours ==
Aberdeen A

- Northern League: 1905–06
