= Michael Hamilton =

Michael Hamilton may refer to:

- Michael Hamilton (politician) (1918–2000), British Conservative Party politician
- Mike Hamilton (athletic director) (born 1963), former director of men's athletics at the University of Tennessee
- Mike Hamilton (guitarist), American guitarist, singer and songwriter
- Michael Hamilton (American football) (born 1973), American football player
- Michael Hamilton, character in The Cloverfield Paradox
