= Douglas Douglas-Hamilton =

Douglas Douglas-Hamilton may refer to:

- Douglas Douglas-Hamilton, 8th Duke of Hamilton (1756–1799)
- Douglas Douglas-Hamilton, 14th Duke of Hamilton (1903–1973)

== See also ==
- Douglas Hamilton (disambiguation)
- Douglas-Hamilton, surname
