= Arthur Francis Hamilton =

British officer of the Indian Medical Service

Arthur Francis Hamilton CIE, MC, FRCS, FRCOG
- Born: 13 May 1880; British India
- Died: 10 May 1965 (aged 84); Walton-on-Thames, England
- Medical career
- Profession: Physician
- Institutions: Indian Medical Service & Grant Medical College
- Sub-specialties: Obstetrics and gynaecology

Arthur Francis Hamilton (13 May 1880 – 10 May 1965) CIE, MC, FRCS, FRCOG was a British doctor who was an officer of the Indian Medical Service (IMS). He won the Military Cross during the First World War, and was later professor of obstetrics and gynaecology at the Grant Medical College, India.

== Early life ==
Hamilton was born in India on 13 May 1880, the son of Thomas Sharp Hamilton who was an officer in the Indian Civil Service. He received his medical education at St Bartholomew's Hospital, passed the Conjoint Diploma and obtained his MB degree from the University of London in 1903. He became a fellow of the Royal College of Surgeons in 1904.

== Career ==
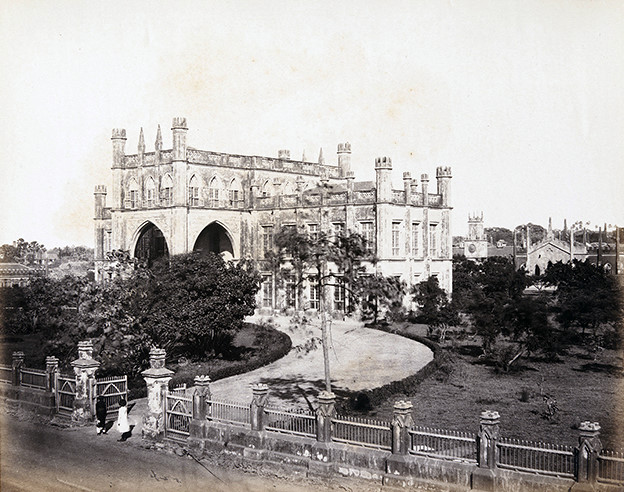
Grant Medical College, Bombay (1855-1862)

Hamilton joined the Indian Medical Service as a lieutenant in 1905. He was promoted to captain in 1908. During the First World War he served in East Africa where he was made a major and mentioned in despatches twice. He was awarded the Military Cross in 1917. He subsequently saw active service in Afghanistan in 1919 and in Waziristan from 1921 to 1924, when he was promoted to lieutenant-colonel. He then served as staff and civil surgeon at Poona after which he became professor of obstetrics and gynaecology at the Grant Medical College in Bombay. He was described in his British Medical Journal obituary as a man of "sedentary habits" which earned him the affectionate nickname of "Alu", the Hindi word for potato. (Note: Erroneously stated to be "Mu" in Plarr's)

In 1929 he was a founding fellow of the Royal College of Obstetricians and Gynaecologists.

== Retirement ==
He retired from the IMS in either 1934 or 1935, following which he moved to Kingston upon Thames, near London, England, where he was chairman of the Kingston Medical Board from 1940.

He enjoyed music, bridge, and the Bombay Turf Club.

== Death ==
After his wife's death he moved to live with family at Walton-on-Thames, where he died on 10 May 1965. He and his wife had no children.
