= Ann Mary Hamilton =

English novelist

Ann Mary Hamilton (fl. 1811) was an English gothic and romantic novelist. Her works mixed the gothic and domestic and were unusual in that her villainous characters tended to be reformed by the compassion of others, rather than destroyed by their own darker urges.

== Bibliography ==
- The Forest of St Bernardo (1806)
- The Irishwoman in London (1810)
- The Adventures of a Seven-Shilling Piece (1811)
- Montalva (or Annals of Guilt) (1811)
- A Winter at St James's (1811)
- The Monk's Daughter (1812)
- The Maiden Wife (1813)

== External sites ==
- Corvey Women Writers on the Web author page
