= Richard Hamilton =

Richard Hamilton may refer to:

== Military ==
- Richard Hamilton (officer) (died 1717), Irish officer
- Richard Hamilton (Medal of Honor) (1836–1881), American Civil War sailor
- Richard Vesey Hamilton (1829–1912), British admiral and First Naval Lord

== Sportsmen ==
- Richard Hamilton (boxer), competed at the Boxing at the 1988 Summer Olympics for Jamaica
- Richard Hamilton (basketball) (born 1978), American basketball player
- Richard Hamilton (rower) (born 1973), British Olympic rower
- Rick Hamilton (Richard R. Hamilton, born 1970), American football player

== Others ==
- Richard Hamilton, 4th Viscount Boyne (1724–1789), Irish MP for Navan
- Richard Hamilton (actor) (1920–2004), American actor
- Richard Hamilton (artist) (1922–2011), British painter and collage artist
- Richard Hamilton (BBC journalist), author of 2011 book The Last Storytellers
- Richard S. Hamilton (1943–2024), American mathematician
- Richard Hamilton (mining) (1855–1943), mine manager at Boulder, Western Australia
- Richard Hamilton (winemaker) (1792–1852), founder of winery in South Australia
- Richard J. Hamilton (1799–1860), American judge and politician
- Richard Hamilton (murderer) (1963–2023), American convicted murderer

== See also ==
- Richard Hamilton Rawson
