= Gordon Hamilton =

Gordon Hamilton may refer to:

- Gordon Hamilton (rugby union) (born 1964), retired rugby union player
- Gordon Hamilton (composer) (born 1982), Australian composer and conductor
- Gordon Hamilton (Australian footballer) (1920–1941), Australian rules footballer
- Gordon Hamilton (dancer) (1918–1959), Australian ballet dancer
- Gordon Hamilton (scientist) (c. 1966–2016), scientist who studied glaciers
- Gordon Hamilton (athlete) (born c. 1935), Northern Irish athlete
- Gordon Hamilton (badminton) (born c. 1955), Scottish badminton player
