= Doug Hamilton =

Doug Hamilton may refer to:

- Doug Hamilton (soccer) (1963–2006), president and general manager of the Los Angeles Galaxy
- Doug Hamilton (rower) (born 1958), Canadian rower
- Doug Hamilton (chess player) (born 1941), Australian chess player

== See also ==
- Dougie Hamilton (born 1993), Canadian ice hockey defenceman
- Douglas Hamilton (disambiguation)
