= Sue Hamilton =

Sue or Susan Hamilton may refer to:

- Sue Hamilton (archaeologist), British specialist in prehistory
- Sue Hamilton (actress) (1945–1969), American model and actress
- Susan Hamilton (soprano) (born 1970), Scottish singer
- Susan Hamilton, Duchess of Hamilton, wife of Alexander Hamilton, 10th Duke of Hamilton
- Lady Susan Hamilton (1814–1889), daughter of Susan Hamilton, Duchess of Hamilton

== See also ==
- Suzy Hamilton, American runner
- Susie Hamilton (born 1950), English artist
- Susie Estella Palmer Hamilton (1862–1942), American suffragist and activist
- Susi Hamilton, member of the North Carolina House of Representatives
