= Fred Hamilton =

Fred Hamilton may refer to:

- Fred Hamilton (Coronation Street), a character on Coronation Street
- Fred Hamilton (bridge), American bridge player
- Fred Hamilton (gardener), Hamilton Gardens benefactor

== See also ==
- Frederick Hamilton (disambiguation)
