= Gustaf Wathier Hamilton =

Swedish count, jurist, and official

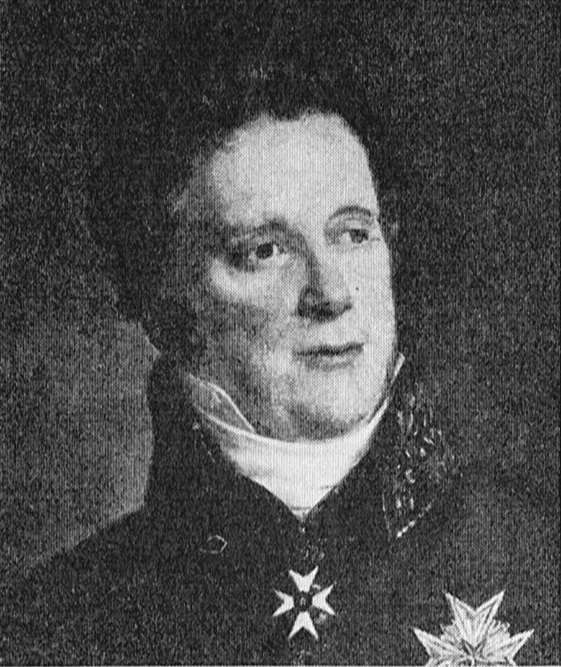
Gustaf Wathier Hamilton

Gustaf Wathier Hamilton (1783–1835) was a Swedish count, jurist and official. His father was Adolf Ludvig Hamilton and his mother was Eva Kristina de Besche.

At 18 years old he received his degree in law from Uppsala University and became a student teacher at Svea Court of Appeal in Stockholm. His performance led to a quick career progression and in 1808 he became secretary of state at the Interior Ministry of the King in Council. In 1826 he became County Governor of Östergötland County.

He was elected into many important committees and was the chairman of the 1830 and 1835 national audits. He married Maria Helena von Strokirch in 1810 and countess Hedvig Carolina Beata Hamilton in 1831. He died in 1835.

He was the father of Henning Hamilton.
