= Andrew Hamilton (rugby union) =

Scotland international rugby union player

- Born: Andrew Steven Hamilton; 8 March 1893 Hamilton, Scotland
- Died: 3 November 1975 (aged 82) Leeds, England

Rugby union career
- Position: Fly Half
Amateur team(s)
Years	Team	Apps	(Points)
- Headingley
Provincial / State sides
Years	Team	Apps	(Points)
- Whites Trial
International career
Years	Team	Apps	(Points)
1914-20	Scotland	2	(0)

Andrew Hamilton (8 March 1893 – 3 November 1975) was a Scotland international rugby union player.

== Rugby Union career ==
=== Amateur career ===
He played for Headingley.

=== Provincial career ===
He played for the Whites Trial side in their match against Blues Trial on 27 December 1913. The Whites Trial side was effectively a Scottish Exiles side; and the Blues Trial was effectively a 'Home Scots' side. He turned out for Whites in the second trial against Blues on 10 January 1914.

=== International career ===
Hamilton was capped by Scotland twice, in the period 1914 to 1920.

== Military career ==
During the First World War Hamilton joined the Royal Army Medical Corps.

== Engineering career ==
After his military and rugby union career ended Hamilton became a civil engineer. He worked for Leeds Corporation Waterworks.

== Family ==
His marriage on 26 July 1926 was reported in the Leeds Mercury the following day:

INTERNATIONAL MARRIED.
Mr. A. S. Hamilton, of Headingley and Scotland.
The Headiingiev and Scotland Rugby footballer, Mr. Andrew Steven Hamilton, was married at Cavendish-road Presbyterian Church, Leeds, yesterday, to Miss Marjorie Adin Overton, the only daughter of Mr. and Mrs John Overton, of Beeston, Leeds. The bride wore a gown of lace and georgette in a light shade of bois de rose, and a large crinoline and velvet hat to match. She carried bouquet of shaded roses. The bridesmaids were Miss Mary Hamilton, sister of the bridegroom, and Miss Mary Leckie, niece of the bridegroom, and Mr. Dan Hamilton, brother of the bridegroom, was best man. After reception held the Masonic Hall at Leeds, Mr. and Mrs. A S. Hamilton travelled to Scotland for the honeymoon.
