= PS Claud Hamilton =

History
- Name: PS Claud Hamilton
- Operator: 1875–1897: Great Eastern Railway; 1897–1914: Corporation of London
- Port of registry: (United Kingdom)
- Builder: John Elder and Company, Fairfield, Govan
- Yard number: 187
- Launched: 3 June 1875
- Out of service: 26 August 1914
- Fate: Scrapped 1914

General characteristics
- Tonnage: 962 gross register tons (GRT)
- Length: 251.6 feet (76.7 m)
- Beam: 30.2 feet (9.2 m)

PS Claud Hamilton was a passenger vessel built for the Great Eastern Railway in 1875.

== History ==
The ship was built by John Elder and Company of Govan for the Great Eastern Railway and launched on 3 June 1875. She was named after the chairman of the Great Eastern Railway, Lord Claude Hamilton. She was despatched from the shipyard on 13 August 1875 and arrived in Harwich on 15 August, after a voyage around the north coast of Scotland via Pentland Firth. Her first captain was William Rivers.

In 1897 she was sold to the Corporation of London and used for transporting cattle. She was sent for scrapping in 1914.
