= Edward Hamilton (priest) =

The Venerable Edward J. Hamilton
- Born: 1819
- Died: 1896 (aged 76–77)
- Religion: Protestant
- Church: Church of Ireland
- Offices held: Archdeacon of Derry

The Venerable Edward James Hamilton (1819–1896) was a cleric in the Church of Ireland.

== Biography ==
He was born in 1819, the son of the Reverend Richard Hamilton and Catherine Tipping.

He became Archdeacon of Derry in 1873. In 1874 he was a member of the committee formed to ensure return of Edward J. Gibson (Conservative) as MP for the Dublin University seat.

He was the main landowner in the townland of Cornonagh/Cornoonagh in the early part of the 19th century. During the famine, the Hamilton family contributed virtually nothing to the relief of their tenants suffering from the potato blight.

== Personal life and legacy ==
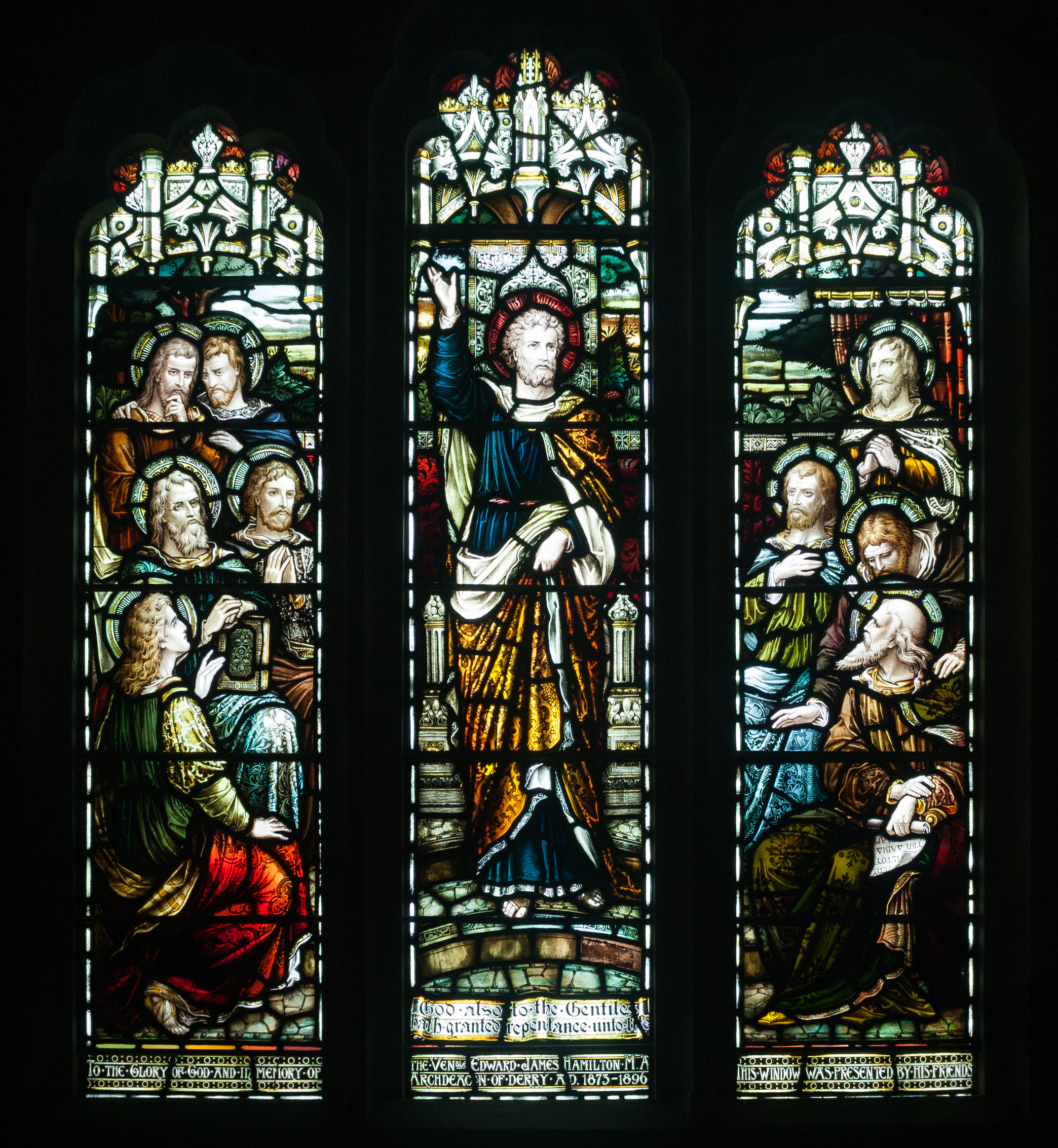
Memorial window to Edward Hamilton in Derry Cathedral

In 1844, Hamilton married Georgiana Susannah Hart, daughter of General George Vaughan Hart and Charlotte Ellerker.

He died in 1896.

In 1896, a memorial window was installed to him in Derry Cathedral.
