= Iain Hamilton =

Iain Hamilton may refer to:

- Iain Hamilton (journalist) (1920–1986), editor at the Spectator
- Iain Hamilton (composer) (1922–2000), Scottish composer

== See also ==
- Ian Hamilton (disambiguation)
- Iain Douglas-Hamilton (born 1942), Scottish zoologist known for his study of elephants
- Iain Hamilton Grant (born 1963), British lecturer
