= Lewis Hamilton (disambiguation) =

Lewis Hamilton (born 1985) is a British Formula One racing driver.

Lewis or Louis Hamilton may also refer to:

== People ==
- Lewis Hamilton (priest), Archdeacon of Elphin in the 18th century
- Louis McLane Hamilton (1844–1868), U.S. cavalry officer in the Civil War and American Indian Wars
- Louis McLane Hamilton (lieutenant) (1876–1911), U.S. Army officer in the Spanish–American War
- Louis Keppel Hamilton (1890–1957), senior Royal Navy officer
- Lewis Hamilton (footballer) (born 1984), English footballer

== Other uses ==
- Lewis Hamilton (Cars), a character in Cars 2
- Lewis Hamilton: Secret Life, an alternate reality game
- SS Lewis Hamilton, a cargo ship built in 1945 and destroyed in 1971
