= Henry Hamilton =

Henry Hamilton may refer to:

- Henry Hamilton (Irish politician) (1692–1743), Irish MP for St Johnstown (Donegal) and Donegal County
- Henry Hamilton (colonial administrator) (c. 1734–1796), lt. governor of Quebec and governor of Bermuda and Dominica
- Henry Hamilton (New York politician) (1788–1846), American lawyer and politician
- Henry Hamilton (playwright) (c. 1853–1918), English playwright, lyrist and critic
- Henry Hamilton (footballer) (1887–1938), English professional footballer
- Henry Hamilton (priest) (1794–1880), English mathematician and clergyman, Dean of Salisbury
- Henry Hamilton (winemaker), founder of a South Australian family winery
- Henry Sidney Hamilton (1887–1976), Canadian MP for Algoma West
- Henry DeWitt Hamilton (1863–1942), adjutant general of the New York State Militia
- Henry Hamilton, 2nd Earl of Clanbrassil (c. 1647–1675)
- Sir Henry Hamilton, 1st Baronet (1710–1782), Anglo-Irish politician

== See also ==
- Harry Hamilton (born 1962), American football player
- Harry Hamilton (politician), member of the Washington House of Representatives
