= Steve Hamilton =

Steve Hamilton may refer to:

- Steve Hamilton (sportsman, born 1934) (1934–1997), American professional baseball and basketball player
- Steve Hamilton (author) (born 1961), American detective novel writer
- Steve Hamilton (American football) (born 1961), American defensive end for the Washington Redskins
- Steve Hamilton (broadcaster) (born Roland James Hamilton, 1950–2009), Scottish broadcaster who voiced the UK version of Wheel of Fortune
- Steve Hamilton, Scottish jazz pianist associated with Earthworks (band)

== See also ==
- Steven Hamilton (born 1970), Australian AFL footballer for North Melbourne
- Steven Hamilton (footballer) (born 1975), Scottish footballer for Kilmarnock, Raith Rovers, Stenhousemuir
