= Hugh Hamilton, 1st Viscount of Glenawly =

Viscount Glenawly

Hugh Hamilton, 1st Viscount Glenawly (c. 1600–1678) was a soldier in Swedish and English service. He was awarded the title of friherre for his service to Sweden.

== Background ==
He came from a family that descended from the Hamiltons of Dalserf, a cadet branch of the House of Hamilton. The progenitor of the Dalserf branch, David Hamilton of Dalserf, was son of John Hamilton of Cadzow (died 1402), and uncle to James Hamilton, 1st Lord Hamilton. Hugh's father had moved from Scotland to Ireland in c 1604. The family had obtained Monea and Ballygawley in Tír Eoghain-Fermanagh and Hugh's father had Monea castle built on their hereditary lands in c 1618, in Hugh's adolescence. Hugh's parents were Malcolm Hamilton, the anglican archbishop of Cashel since 1623, and his first wife Mary Willkie of Sachtonhill.

== Life ==
Hugh (also known as Hugo in Swedish), who mentions himself as being originally the third son and with poor prospects of inheritance, moved from Ireland to Sweden and took part in Thirty Years War. He had a regiment recruited from the British Isles and led them in Germany. In Swedish service, he soon rose to be colonel. He received properties Ljung and Slefringe in Östergötland.

In 1637 Hugh Hamilton married Margaret Forratt, of Scots family, who was the widow of colonel and ambassador baron James Spens, who had died 1632, and been in Swedish service. Margaret had two sons of her first marriage (major, baron Axel Spens of Orreholmen, 1626–56, and colonel, baron Jakob Spens of Orreholmen, 1627–65), who thus became Hugh's stepsons. By his first marriage, lord Hugh had one surviving child, his daughter baroness Bridget Margaret Hamilton af Deserf, who in 1659 married baron Gustav Adolf Skytte.

He was the first Hamilton in Swedish military service to get the rights of nobleman in the Swedish chamber of nobles as in 1648 he and his youngest half-brother Lewis (Ludvig) Hamilton were naturalized as Swedish noblemen in Sweden. In 1654, he and Ludvig were created Friherre af Deserf by King Charles X Gustav of Sweden, and thus Hugh became Baron Hamilton of Deserf in the peerage of Sweden. His relatives, barons and counts Hamilton (descended from his nephews whom Hugh encouraged to come to Swedish service), continue up to today Sweden.

Baroness Margaret had died, and Hugh married secondly a lady whose name was Jacomina. In c 1659, Hugh married for third time, the young lady Susan Balfour of Pitcullo, a kinswoman related with families who had earlier held Glenawly. They got their only surviving son, William Hamilton (c 1660 - c 1681), and several daughters:

- Baroness Henriette Amelia Hamilton of Deserf, died young
- Baroness Arabella Susan Hamilton of Deserf, who married three times, but had no surviving children. Her husbands included Sir John Magill, 1st Baronet and Marcus Trevor, 3rd Viscount Dungannon.
- Baroness Nicola Sophia Hamilton of Deserf, who married firstly Sir Tristram Beresford, and secondly General Sir Richard Gorges of Kilbrew, and had children of both her marriages.

1659 his childless brother Archibald Hamilton, who had obtained the feudal barony of Glenawley, died and was inherited by living siblings. Hugh, as his eldest surviving brother, succeeded to the baronial title. 1660 king Charles II of England created Hugh, who then yet lived in Sweden, 1st Lord of Glenawly in peerage of Ireland, which some have said meant a viscountcy, but some count it as a regular barony. He thus got rights to a seat in the Upper House of the Parliament of Ireland.

After the restoration of Charles II, he in 1662 returned to Britain, left Sweden for good, and was installed as a Privy Councillor in Ireland.

Viscount Hugh Hamilton's only son survived his father by only a couple of years, and died in an accident. Hugh's grandson sir Marcus Beresford, who married lady Catherine Power of Tír Eoghain, baroness de la Poer suo jure, was created 1st Earl of Tyrone. Hugh's great-grandson sir George de La Poer Beresford, 2nd Earl of Tyrone, was created 1st Marquess of Waterford. All marquesses of Waterford up to our days have thus been Hugh Hamilton's descendants.

Friherre Hugh Hamilton af Deserf's descendants married into plenty of families of British aristocracy. His recent descendants include:

- Brigadier Andrew Parker-Bowles, former husband of The Duchess of Cornwall
- the late Rt Hon Sir Angus Ogilvy, husband of Princess Alexandra, The Hon Lady Ogilvy
- Prince Richard, Duke of Gloucester

Hugh Hamilton also was the paternal uncle of the royal adjutant, lieutenant colonel Malcolm Hamilton (1635–1699) and of general, baron Hugo Hamilton (1655–1724), as well as great-uncle of field marshal count Gustaf David Hamilton of Barsebäck (1699–1788) and of military judge, field marshal, baron Hugo Johan Hamilton. Yet one of his nephews was colonel, baron Gustav Hamilton (1650s-1691), a participant of the Williamite War in Ireland and community-chosen governor of Enniskillen.
