= Neil Hamilton =

Neil Hamilton may refer to:

- Neil Hamilton (actor) (1899–1984), American actor
- Neil Hamilton (politician) (born 1949), British politician, former Senedd member and leader of UKIP
- Neil Hamilton (lawyer) (fl. late 20th century), American lawyer and author

== See also ==
- Neil Hamilton Fairley, Australian physician and soldier
