= Ian Hamilton =

Ian Hamilton may refer to:

- Ian Hamilton (British Army officer) (1853–1947), British general
- Ian Hamilton (cricketer) (1906–1992), New Zealand cricketer
- Ian Hamilton (advocate) (1925–2022), Scottish lawyer
- Ian Hamilton (critic) (1938–2001), British critic, poet, literary magazine publisher and editor
- Ian Hamilton (footballer) (1940–2021), English footballer who played for Bristol Rovers, Exeter City & Newport County
- Ian Hamilton (writer) (born 1946), Canadian author of the Ava Lee mystery novel series
- Ian Hamilton (footballer, born 1950) (1950–2024), English footballer, known as "Chico"
- Ian Hamilton (footballer, born 1956), English football midfielder with Darlington, La Louvière and Liège
- Ian Hamilton (footballer, born 1967) (1967–2023), English football midfielder with West Bromwich Albion and Sheffield United
- Ian Hamilton (baseball) (born 1995), baseball player
- Abigail Austen (born 1964), previously known as Ian Hamilton, a transsexual woman and the first officer in the British Army to complete gender reassignment

== See also ==
- Iain Hamilton (disambiguation)
