= Peter Hamilton =

Peter Hamilton may refer to:

== Writers ==
- Peter F. Hamilton (born 1960), English science-fiction writer
- Peter Hamilton (editor), Scottish editor of Nebula Science Fiction

== Sportspeople ==
- Peter Hamilton (footballer, born 1931) (1931–1981), Australian rules footballer for North Melbourne
- Peter Hamilton (footballer, born 1956) (1956-2019), Australian rules footballer for Melbourne
- Pete Hamilton (1942–2017), American race car driver

== Others ==
- Peter Hunter Hamilton (1800–1857), one of the founding fathers of Hamilton, Ontario
- Peter J. Hamilton (1859–1927), Alabama lawyer/historian and Puerto Rico federal judge
- Peter Hamilton, captain of Air Canada Flight 621
- Peter Hamilton (diplomat), New Zealand diplomat

== See also ==
- William Peter Hamilton (1867–1929), Wall Street Journal editor
