= Lynn Hamilton =

Lyn(n) or Lynne Hamilton may refer to:

- Lynn Hamilton (actress) (1930–2025), American actress
- Lynn Hamilton (basketball) (born 1962), née Polson, Canadian basketball player
- Lynn Hamilton (politician)
- Lyn Hamilton (1944–2009), author
- Lynne Hamilton (born 1950), English-born professional and gospel singer
