= Justin Hamilton =

Justin Hamilton may refer to:

- Justin Hamilton (safety) (born 1982), American football safety
- Justin Hamilton (comedian), Australian comedian, writer and radio host
- Justin Hamilton (basketball, born 1990), American basketball center
- Justin Hamilton (basketball, born 1980), American basketball point guard/shooting guard
- Justin Hamilton (defensive lineman) (born 1993), American football player
