= George Douglas Hamilton =

New Zealand runholder and station manager

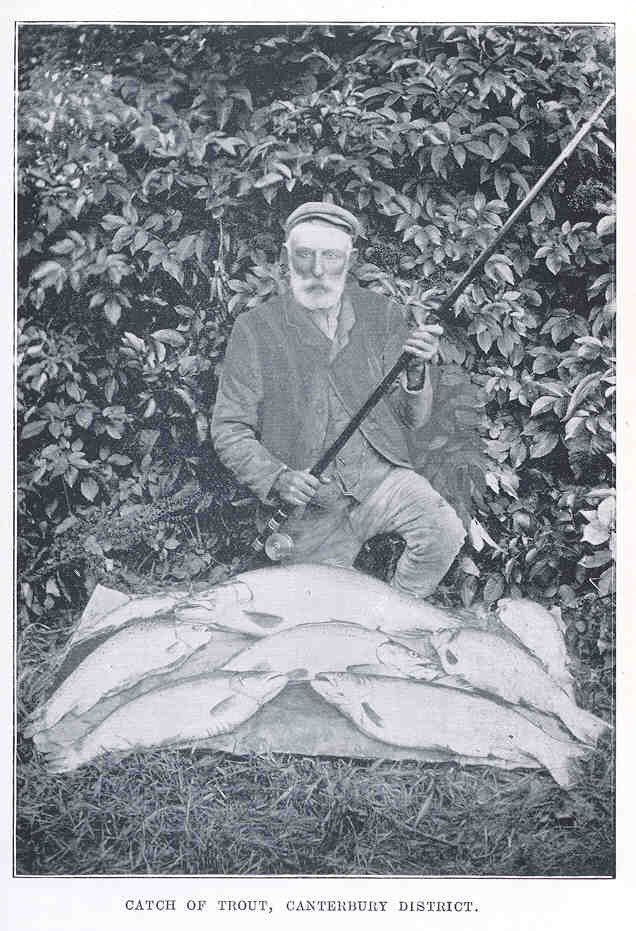
George Douglas Hamilton, Canterbury District

George Douglas Hamilton (15 July 1835 – 29 November 1911) was a New Zealand runholder and station manager. He was born in Antwerp, Belgium on 15 July 1835.
