= Ann Hamilton =

Ann Hamilton may refer to:

- Ann Hamilton (artist) (born 1956), American artist
- Ann Hamilton (actress) (born 1939), British actress known for her appearances on the Morecambe & Wise Show
- Ann Lewis Hamilton, American television writer
- Ann Mary Hamilton, English gothic and romantic novelist

== See also ==
- Anne Hamilton (disambiguation)
