= Frederic Hamilton (priest) =

Frederic Charles Hamilton was Archdeacon of Limerick from 1893 to 1904.

Hamilton was born in Gloucestershire and educated at Trinity College, Dublin. He was Assistant Chaplain at the Mariners' Chapel the Mariner's Church, Kingstown (now Dún Laoghaire) from 1851 to 1852 after which he served two curacies in Limerick. He was Vicar of Bruree from 1868 to 1869; and then Rector of St John Limerick from 1869 until his appointment as archdeacon.
