= Eric Hamilton (cricketer) =

South African cricketer

Personal information
- Full name: Eric Peter Hamilton
- Born: 5 May 1913; Johannesburg, Transvaal, South Africa
- Died: 15 July 1943 (aged 30) over Sicily, Fascist Italy

Domestic team information
- Years: Team
- 1936: City of Johannesburg
- 1937: Transvaal

Career statistics
| Competition | First-class |
|---|---|
| Matches | 2 |
| Runs scored | 65 |
| Batting average | 21.66 |
| 100s/50s | 0/0 |
| Top score | 33 |
| Balls bowled | – |
| Wickets | – |
| Bowling average | – |
| 5 wickets in innings | – |
| 10 wickets in match | – |
| Best bowling | – |
| Catches/stumpings | – |
- Source: Cricinfo, 26 July 2020

Eric Peter Hamilton (5 May 1913 – 15 July 1943) was a South African first-class cricketer and South African Air Force officer.

Hamilton was born in Johannesburg on 5 May 1913. His debut in cricket took place on 5 October 1936 for the City of Johannesburg against The Rest at the Old Wanderers. During the match, Hamilton scored 32 runs, but was dismissed both innings. Hamilton's second cricket match, representing Transvaal against the Orange Free State, occurred on 29–30 January 1937. During the first inning, Hamilton made 33 runs before he was dismissed by Henry Sparks.

During the Second World War, Hamilton enlisted in the South African Air Force and was commissioned as a lieutenant. Trained as a Martin Baltimore pilot, he was posted to No. 21 Squadron in Malta, where the squadron supported the Allied invasion of Sicily. During a daytime bombing mission on 15 July 1943, Hamilton and his two crew members were shot down and killed in Baltimore AG390. He is buried at the Syracuse War Cemetery.
