= Gary Hamilton =

Gary Hamilton may refer to:

== In sport ==
- Gary Hamilton (basketball) (born 1986), American basketball player
- Gary Hamilton (footballer, born 1965), Scottish football player for Middlesbrough and Darlington
- Gary Hamilton (footballer, born 1980), football player from Northern Ireland
- Gary Hamilton (kickboxer) (born 1980), Northern Ireland's kickboxer

== Others ==
- Gary Hamilton (producer), Australian film producer, founder of Arclight Films
- Gary G. Hamilton, American television journalist
