= Malcolm Hamilton (bishop) =

Malcolm Hamilton (died 1629) was a Scotsman who was the Church of Ireland Archbishop of Cashel from 1623 to 1629.

He was Rector of Devenish, before being appointed Chancellor of Down in 1612. He was consecrated archbishop of Cashel at Drogheda by Archbishop Christopher Hampton of Armagh on 29 June 1623. He died of an unknown infectious disease on 25 April 1629 and was buried in the cathedral at the Rock of Cashel in County Tipperary.

He had Monea Castle built on his inherited lands in Fermanagh, starting in 1616, completed about 1618, and a bawn added in 1622.

== Family ==
One of the sons of his first marriage to Mary Wilkie of Sachtonhill was the 1st Viscount of Glenawly, a soldier in Swedish service, who in Sweden was created Baron of Deserf.

Lewis Hamilton was the son of his second marriage, and he also was in Swedish service and was elevated there to baronial rank. Through him, colonel, governor Gustav Hamilton (1650s–1691) was Malcolm's grandson.

Captain John Hamilton of Monea was Malcolm's younger son of his first marriage. His sons, Malcolm and Hugo, went into Swedish service in 1655 and were, in 1689, created barons in the peerage of Sweden.
