= Barsebäck Castle =

Castle in Scania, Sweden

- Barsebäck slott
- Kävlinge Municipality
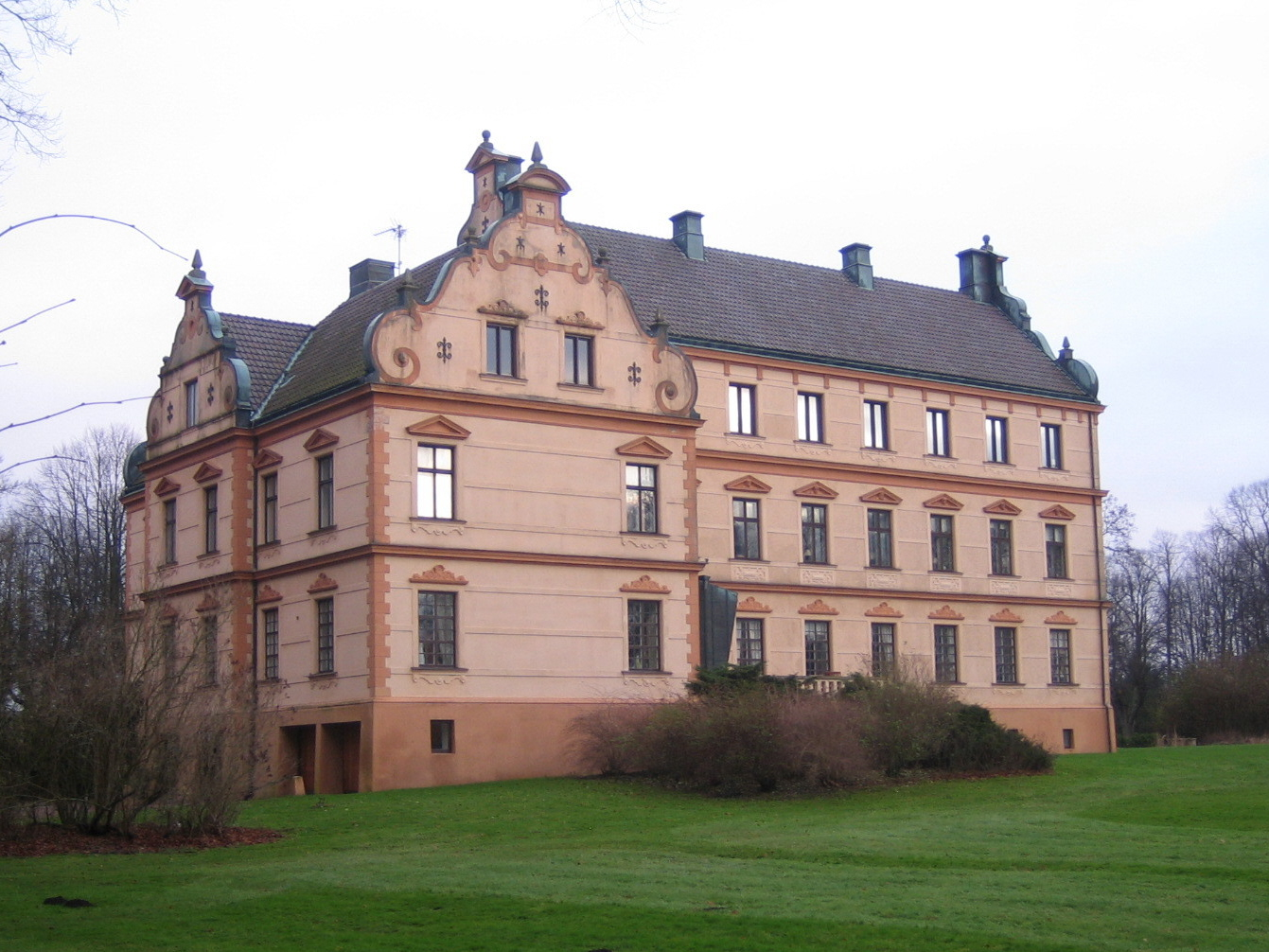
- Barsebäck Castle

Site information
- Type: Castle
- Open to the public: No

Location
- Scania, Sweden
- Location within Skåne
- Coordinates: 55.775833°N 12.951389°E

Site history
- Built: 1300s

Barsebäck Castle (Swedish: Barsebäcks slott) is a castle in the village of Barsebäck, Kävlinge Municipality, close to the shore of Öresund in Scania, southern Sweden. It has existed in various versions at its present location since the 12th century, but only received its current shape during a major renovations and rebuildings in 1889 and 1940. The current main structure is a three-story, 19th-century reconstruction in Dutch Renaissance style, made to resemble the many original Renaissance castles still remaining in the Scanian landscape.

== History ==
After the Scanian War, Barsebäck Castle was, along with all other castles owned by the Scanian noble family Thott, confiscated by the Swedish Crown and became Crown property. In 1743, the castle was bought by the Swedish Colonel and Regimental Commander Gustaf David Hamilton who was stationed in Malmö. The current owner remains one of Hamilton's distant relatives.
