= Hugo Hamilton, Baron Hamilton =

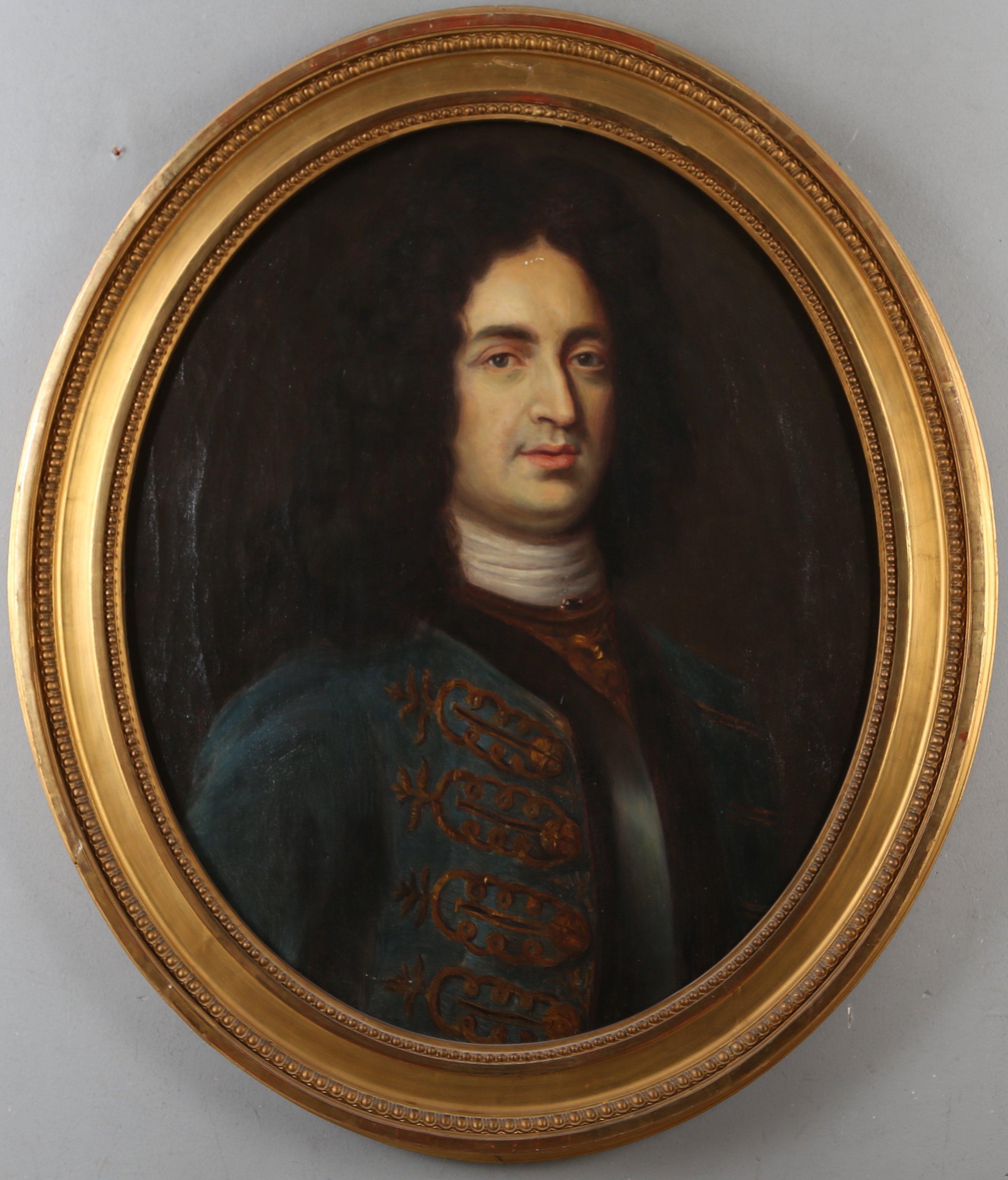
Hugo Hamilton (1655–1724)

Hugo Hamilton, Baron Hamilton (also Hugh; died 1724) was a Swedish military commander of Scots-Irish background. His title was Swedish.

== Life ==
He was a younger son of Captain John Hamilton of Ballygally in County Tyrone, Ireland, by his wife Jean, daughter of James Somerville. His father was a younger son of Malcolm Hamilton, and Hugh Hamilton, 1st Viscount of Glenawly was his uncle.

After seeing military service at home, Hamilton was summoned to Sweden in 1680 by his elder brother Malcolm, an officer in the Swedish army. There his earliest commission was as lieutenant of the Älvsborg Regiment, in which he rose to be captain. In 1693 he and his brother were ennobled in Sweden as barons Hamilton de Hageby.

Hamilton came to prominence in the wars of Charles XII, especially against the Danes in 1710 at the Battle of Helsingborg. He was in action defending against the Russians at Gävle in 1719. He became a general and master of the ordnance. He died in 1724, and was buried in the province of Jonköping.

== Family ==
Hamilton married a daughter of Henrik Ardvisson of Gothenburg, and left numerous children. His sixth son, Gustaf David Hamilton, was created Count Hamilton in 1751 and became a field marshal.

== Notes ==
Attribution

This article incorporates text from a publication now in the public domain: Stephen, Leslie; Lee, Sidney, eds. (1890). "Hamilton, Hugh (d.1724)". Dictionary of National Biography. Vol. 24. London: Smith, Elder & Co.
