= Anne Hamilton =

Anne Hamilton may refer to:

- Anne Hamilton (1766–1846), friend of Queen Caroline
- Anne Hamilton, Countess of Huntly (c.1535–in or after 1574), daughter of James Hamilton, Duke of Chatellerault
- Anne Hamilton, 3rd Duchess of Hamilton (1631–1716), daughter of Sir James Hamilton, 1st Duke of Hamilton
- Lord Anne Hamilton (1709–1748), son of James Hamilton, 4th Duke of Hamilton
- Anne Hamilton, Duchess of Hamilton (1720–1771)
- Anne Hamilton, 2nd Countess of Ruglen (1698–1748)

== See also ==
- Ann Hamilton (disambiguation)
