= Gustaf David Hamilton =

Swedish count and soldier

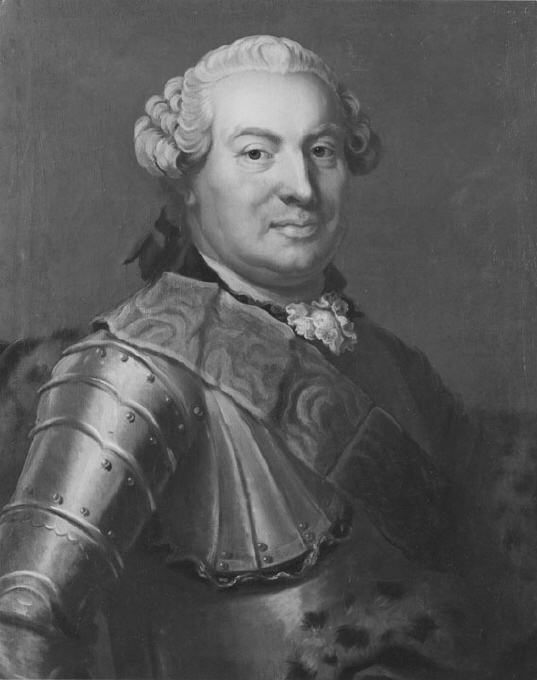
Gustaf David Hamilton

Gustaf David Hamilton (29 January 1699 – 29 December 1788) was a Swedish count and soldier. He was born in Barsebäck, Malmöhus County, Sweden, as the son of Hugo Hamilton, Baron Hamilton. He left Sweden in 1718-1720 to educate himself in warfare in France. In 1720 he became a captain and in 1740 he became a lieutenant colonel, both during French service. In 1741 he returned to Sweden and made a series of career progressions. In 1741 he became a colonel, in 1747 a major general and in 1755 lieutenant general. He was also named a count in 1751, and in 1765 he gained the right to the title field marshal. In 1778 he was made a Lord of the Realm. He was also politically active in the Hats.

In 1758 he was made commander of Swedish forces in Swedish Pomerania during the Seven Years' War. He led an advance on the Prussian capital of Berlin, but retreated following the Battle of Fehrbellin in September 1758. Dissatisfaction with his performance led to him being replaced by his superiors.

He was the father of Adolf Ludvig Hamilton.
