= Gustav Hamilton =

Irish soldier, governor of Inniskillen (died 1691)

Baron Gustaf or Gustav Ludvigsson Hamilton (late 1650s – 1691), known as the governor of Enniskillen (their chief of defence) in Northern Ireland, was colonel, and de jure friherre of Deserf in peerage of Sweden.

== Biography ==
Gustav was born son of Swedish baron Ludvig Malkolmsson Hamilton (died 1662) and his wife lady Anna Karin Larsdotter Grubbe Stiernfelt, daughter of lord Lars Pedersson Grubbe Stiernfelt, sometime Swedish Secretary of State, and his wife Karin Gotskalksdotter.

From father's side, In 1684, the English-held government, fearful of the Mac Sweeney clan, placed a garrison in Doe Castle, County Donegal, commanded by Major Gustavus Hamilton. family fortress Monea Castle. The Enniskilleners chose him as their governor. Colonel Hamilton fought for the Protestant cause. In 1689 the town of Enniskillen was subjected to a siege that year by Jacobite troops, during the conflict which resulted from the ousting of James II of England by his Protestant rival, William III of Orange. This siege was successfully resisted. As a direct result of this conflict Enniskillen developed not only as a market town but also as a garrison which became home to two regiments. These events also sowed the seeds for the conflict which engulfed Northern Ireland during the latter half of the 20th century, commonly referred to as The Troubles.

Gustav incurred enormous financial losses in the Williamite wars and that impoverished his branch of the Hamilton clan.

After his death in 1691, his wife (Margaret Jones) and children (Andrew and Gustav, both became pastors) continued to live at Monea, but they had to sell the estate in 1704.

Gustav's namesake great-great-grandson, barrister Gustav Hamilton, then of Dublin, laid in mid-19th century claim to the baronial title and seat of Deserf in peerage of Sweden, as he was de jure 9th friherre of Deserf.
