= Farquhar =

Farquhar is a surname of Scottish origin, derived from the Scottish Gaelic fearchar, from fear ("man") and car ("beloved"). Farquharson is a further derivation of the name, meaning "son of Farquhar". The name originated as a given name, but had become established as a surname by the 14th century.

The name's pronunciation depends on the person, family, and place. In Scotland it can be /ˈfɑːrkɑːr/. In various English-speaking countries it has often been /ˈfɑːrkɑːr/, /ˈfɑːrkər/, /ˈfɑːrkwɑːr/, or /ˈfɑːrkwər/.

Notable people with the surname include:

- Andrew Farquhar (fl. 1973–2008), British Army major-general
- Anthony Farquhar (1940–2023), Irish Roman Catholic prelate and auxiliary bishop
- Arthur Briggs Farquhar (1838–1925), American industrialist and businessman
- Craig Farquhar (born 2003), Northern Irish footballer
- Danny Farquhar (born 1987), American baseball pitcher
- David Farquhar (composer) (1928–2007), New Zealand composer
- Doug Farquhar (1921–2005), Scottish-American soccer player
- Edward Allan Farquhar (1871–1935), shipping agent and Harbors Board chairman in South Australia
- Francis P. Farquhar (1887–1974), American president of the Sierra Club and author
- Gary Farquhar (born 1971), Scottish footballer
- George Farquhar (1678–1707), Irish dramatist
- George Farquhar (priest) (died 1927), Dean of St Andrews, Dunkeld and Dunblane
- Graham Farquhar (born 1947), Australian plant physiologist and biophysicist
- Helen Farquhar (1859–1953), British numismatist
- Henry Hallowell Farquhar (1884–1968), professor at Harvard Business School
- Horace Farquhar, 1st Earl Farquhar (1844–1923), British financier and politician
- J. N. Farquhar (1861–1929), Scottish educational missionary to Calcutta and Orientalist
- James Farquhar (MP) (1764–1833), Scottish Member of Parliament
- James Farquhar (footballer) (c. 1879–?), Scottish footballer
- James Augustus Farquhar (1842–1930), Canadian master mariner and captain
- John Farquhar (disambiguation)
- JW Farquhar (born 1937/1938), American musician and singer-songwriter
- Kellyanne Farquhar, Scottish actress
- Kurt Farquhar, American television and film music composer
- Margaret Farquhar (1930–2026), Scottish politician
- Marilyn Farquhar (1928–2019), American cellular biologist
- Marion Jones Farquhar (1879–1965), American tennis player
- Meg Farquhar (1910–1988), British golfer
- Murray Farquhar (1918–1993), magistrate convicted of corrupt influence
- Norman von Heldreich Farquhar (1840–1907), United States Navy rear admiral
- Percival Farquhar (1865–1953), American investor
- Peter Farquhar (1946–2015), Scottish novelist, English teacher and murder victim
- Ralph Farquhar (born 1951), American film and television producer and screenwriter and co-creator of three sitcoms
- Regan Farquhar (born 1978), birth name of rapper Busdriver
- Robert D. Farquhar (1872–1967), American architect
- Robert Townsend Farquhar (1776–1830), British colonial governor
- Robert W. Farquhar (1932–2015), American spaceflight mission specialist
- Robin Hugh Farquhar (born 1938), Canadian academic and former university administrator/president
- Ryan Farquhar (born 1976), competitive motorcycle racer
- Scott Farquhar (born 1979), Australian businessman
- Shawn Farquhar (born 1962), Canadian illusionist
- Simon Farquhar (born 1972), Scottish playwright
- Stan Farquhar (1916–1992), Canadian politician, son of Thomas
- Stuart Farquhar (born 1982), New Zealand javelin thrower
- Thomas Farquhar (1875–1962), Canadian politician
- Wally Farquhar (1875–1960), Australian cricketer
- William Farquhar (1774–1839), Scottish major-general of the East India Company
- William Henry Farquhar (1813–1887), prominent citizen of Montgomery County, Maryland

== In fiction ==
- Everard Farquharson: a character appearing in Larry Grayson's 1980 book, 'Larry Grayson's Parlour Fun Book', (Hamlyn (publisher), ISBN 0600202348.

== See also ==
- Farquharson
- Lord Farquaad, fictional character in Shrek films
- MacFarquhar
- Peyton Fahrquhar, fictional character in the short story "An Occurrence at Owl Creek Bridge"
- Ffarquhar, fictional village in The Railway Series books by the Rev. W. Awdry
