= Farquharson =

Farquharson (/ˈfɑːrxərsən/, /ˈfɑːrkərsən/ or /ˈfɑːrkwərsən/) is a surname of Scottish origin, and may refer to:

== Sports ==
=== Association football ===
- Cali Farquharson (born 1993), American soccer player
- Jordan Farquharson (born 2000), Bahamian footballer
- Nick Farquharson (born 1988), English professional football player
- Priestley Farquharson (born 1997), English footballer
- Tom Farquharson (1900–1970), Irish professional football player
- Zimmorlei Farquharson (born 2002), Australian rules footballer

=== Other ===
- Ashley Farquharson (born 1999), American Olympic luger
- Hugh Farquharson (1911–1985), Canadian Olympic ice hockey player
- Norman Farquharson (1907–1992) South African tennis player
- Samantha Farquharson (born 1969), English athlete
- Tom Farquharson (tennis) (born 1992), British tennis player

== Arts ==
- Alex Farquharson (born 1969), British curator and art critic, Director of Tate Britain
- A. S. L. Farquharson, British classicist and translator
- Charlie Farquharson, character created by Canadian actor Don Harron
- David Farquharson (1839–1907), Scottish landscape painter
- Joseph Farquharson (1846–1935), Scottish landscape painter
- Robert Farquharson, stage name of Robin de la Condamine (1877–1966), English actor

== Other ==
- Alexander Farquharson (1864–1951), Scottish doctor, barrister, soldier and politician
- Sir Angus Farquharson of Finzean (1935–2018), Scottish pioneer in sustainable rural community development, Lord Lieutenant of Aberdeenshire 1998–2010
- Francis Farquharson (architect) (1805–1878), Scottish architect/builder
- Francis Farquharson (1837–1875), Scottish soldier, recipient of the Victoria Cross
- Graham Farquharson (1940–2022), Canadian mining engineer
- Henry Richard Farquharson (1857–1895) English politician
- Henry Farquharson (1675–1739) Scottish-Russian mathematician
- James Farquharson (1781–1843), Scottish minister, meteorologist and scientific writer
- Lady Anne Farquharson-MacKintosh (1723–1787), Scottish Jacobite of the Clan Farquharson
- Marian Farquharson (1846–1912), British naturalist and women's rights activist
- Martha Durward Farquharson (1847–1929), Irish-born Australian hospital matron and owner
- Mary Farquharson (1901–1982), American politician
- May Farquharson (1894–1992), Jamaican social worker, birth control advocate, philanthropist and reformer
- Ray Farquharson (1897–1965), Canadian doctor, university professor and medical researcher
- Robert Farquharson (politician) (1836–1918), Scottish doctor and politician
- Robert Farquharson (born 1969), Australian murderer
- Robin Farquharson (1930–1973), British mathematician
- Walter H. Farquharson (born 1936), Moderator of the United Church of Canada and hymn writer
- Christian Farquharson-Kennedy (1870–1917), Scottish teacher, socialist and suffragist

== Multiple people ==
- Donald Farquharson (disambiguation)
- John Farquharson (disambiguation)
- William Farquharson (disambiguation)

== See also ==
- Clan Farquharson
- Farquharson rifle
- Farquhar (disambiguation)
