= James Farquhar =

James Farquhar may refer to:

- James Farquhar (MP) (1764–1833), Scottish Member of Parliament
- James Farquhar (footballer) (c. 1879–?), Scottish footballer
- James Augustus Farquhar (1842–1930), Canadian master mariner and captain

== See also ==
- James Farquharson, Scottish minister, meteorologist and scientific writer
