= Battle of Pulo Aura =

Minor naval engagement of the Napoleonic Wars

- Part of the Napoleonic Wars
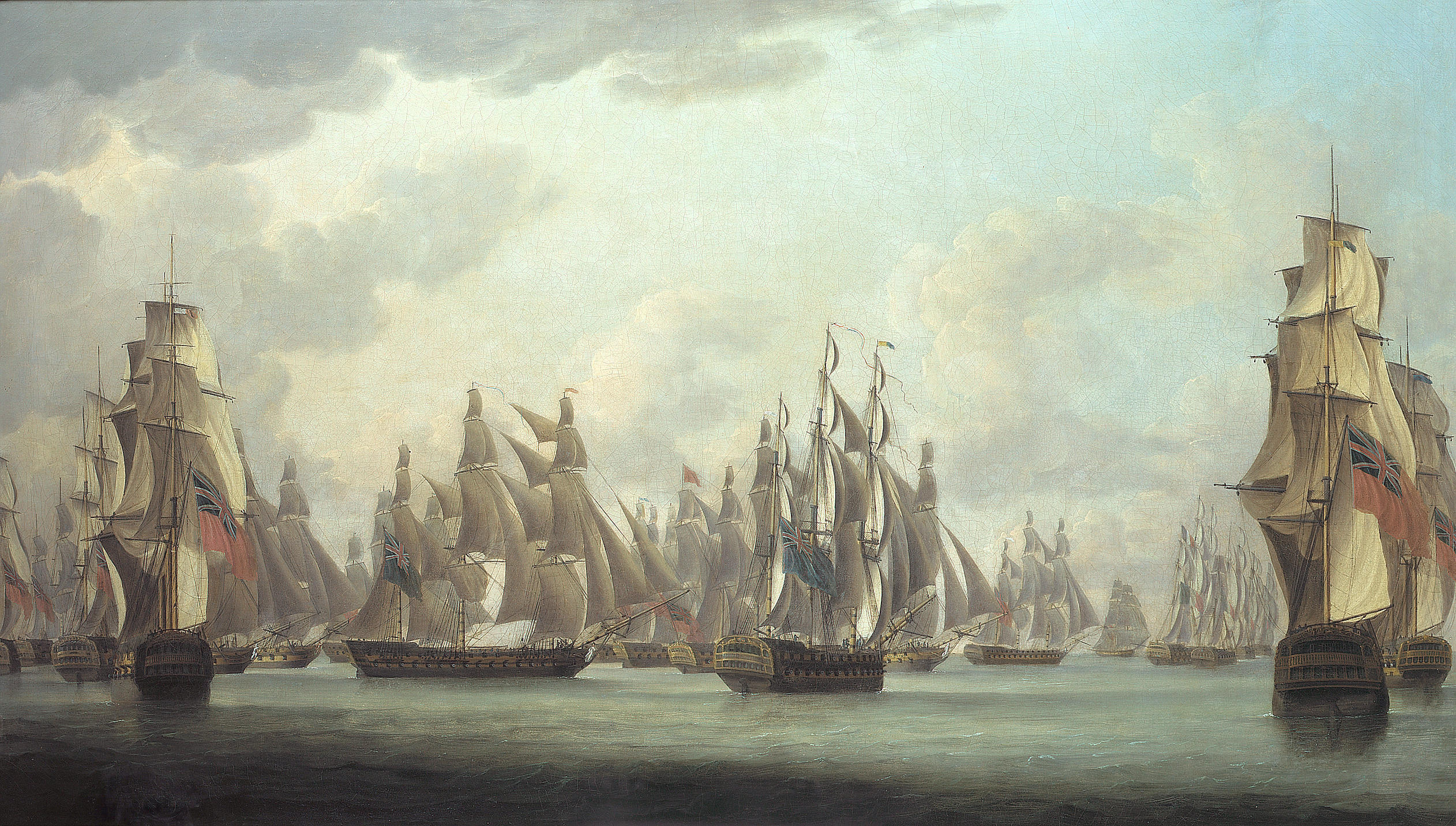
- Commodore Dance's celebrated action against a French squadron in the Straits of Malacca on 15th. February 1804; Robert Dodd, 1804
Date	15 February 1804
Location	Off Pulo Aura, South China Sea
Result	British victory

Belligerents
East India Company	France; Batavian Commonwealth

Commanders and leaders
Nathaniel Dance	Charles-Alexandre Linois

Strength
29 merchant ships; 1 brig	1 ship of the line; 2 frigates; 1 corvette; 1 brig

Casualties and losses
1 wounded; 1 killed	None

The Battle of Pulo Aura was a minor naval engagement of the Napoleonic Wars fought on 14 February 1804, in which a large British East India Company (EIC) convoy intimidated, drove off and chased away a powerful French Navy squadron. Although the French squadron was much stronger than the British convoy, Commodore Nathaniel Dance's aggressive tactics persuaded Counter-admiral Charles-Alexandre Léon Durand Linois to retire after only a brief exchange of fire. Dance then chased the French squadron until his convoy was out of danger, whereupon he resumed his passage toward British India.

The battle occurred during an extended commerce raiding operation by Linois' squadron, led by the ship of the line Marengo. In 1803, before war broke out, Linois sailed to the Indian Ocean to install garrisons in French and Batavian colonies and target British merchantmen. A prime target was the "China Fleet", a convoy of East Indiamen carrying millions of pounds' worth of trade goods. Although escorted by smaller merchant ships, the only available escort warship was the EIC armed brig Ganges. Dutch informants told Linois of the fleet's destination and date of departure from Canton while he was at Batavia, and he set sail on 28 December 1803, eventually locating the convoy in early February.

Although no warships protected the convoy, Dance knew that lookouts could mistake a large East Indiaman for a ship of the line. He had his Indiamen form a line of battle and raise flags suggesting his fleet included part of the Royal Navy squadron operating in the Indian Ocean. Although Linois's ships were clearly superior, the bold British response unsettled him, and he quickly broke off combat. Dance maintained the ruse, aggressively pursuing Linois for two hours until the convoy was safe. The successful deception ensured the valuable cargo reached Britain without loss.

King George III knighted Dance for his courage and various mercantile and patriotic organisations awarded him large sums of money, while both Napoleon and Linois's own officers personally castigated him for his failure to press the attack against a weaker and extremely valuable enemy. Although he remained in command of the squadron for another two years and had some minor success against undefended merchant ships, he suffered a string of defeats and inconclusive engagements against weaker British naval forces. Ironically, Linois was captured at the action of 13 March 1806 by a numerically superior British battle squadron which he had mistaken for a merchant convoy.

== Background ==
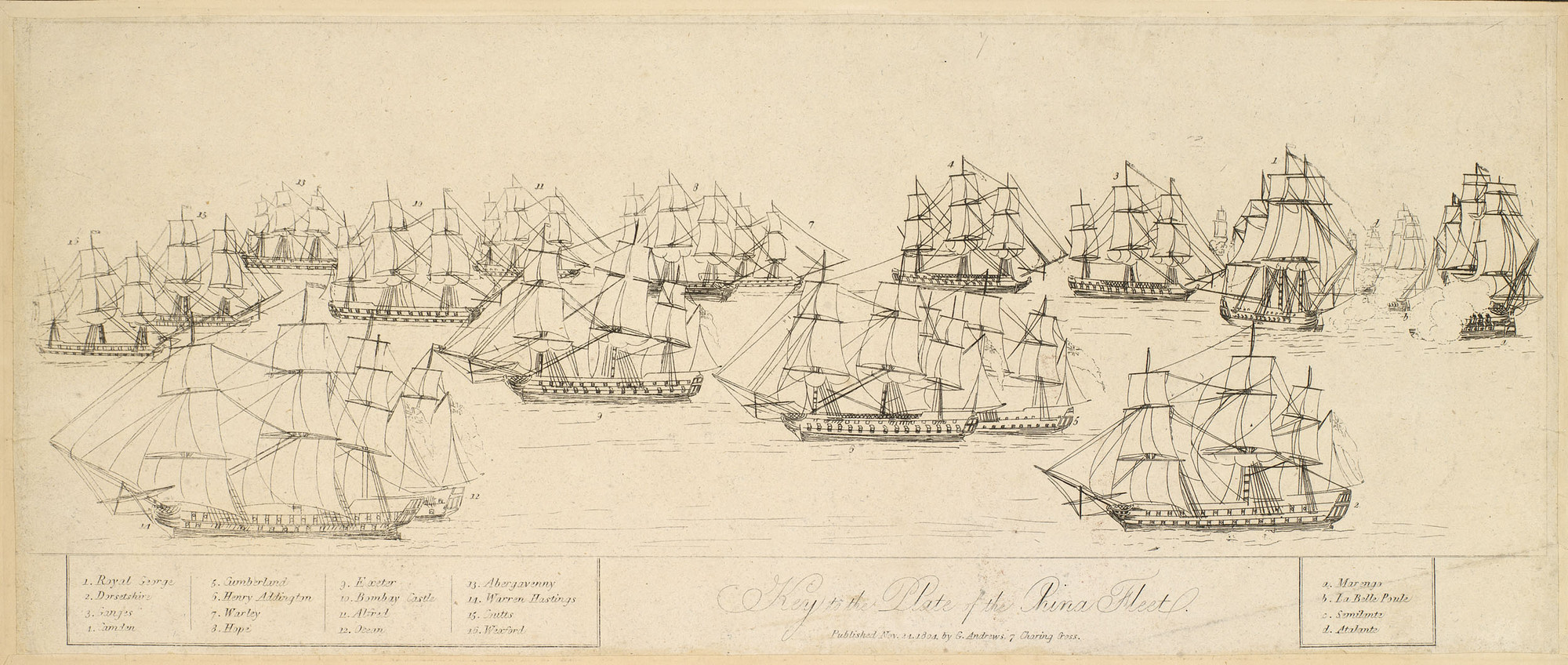
An illustration of the China Fleet during the battle by Francis Sartorius the Younger after a drawing by an officer onboard Henry Addington

During the French Revolutionary and Napoleonic Wars, the economy of the United Kingdom relied heavily on its ability to trade with the British Empire, especially Britain's valuable colonies in India. British trade with Asia was primarily conducted by the East India Company (EIC) using large, well-armed merchant ships known as East Indiamen. These ships were between 500 and 1200 nominal tons burthen (bm) and could carry up to 36 guns to defend against pirates, privateers, and smaller warships. However, they were not designed to fight large warships like frigates or ships of the line, as their guns were often of inferior design and their crews less trained.

Despite these disadvantages, East Indiamen's size made them resemble a small ship of the line from a distance, often augmented by paintwork and dummy cannon. In the Bali Strait incident of 28 January 1797, an unescorted convoy of British East Indiamen used this similarity to intimidate a French frigate squadron into withdrawing without a fight. A similar event occurred in February 1799 during the Macau Incident, where a Franco-Spanish squadron attacking a British merchant convoy was driven off by a small Royal Navy squadron escorting it. British East Indiamen would gather at Asian ports and set out for Britain in large convoys, often carrying millions of pounds' worth of trade goods. The journey usually took six months, with the ships returning carrying troops and passengers to bolster British forces in Asia. "Country ships", smaller British merchantmen often unaffiliated with the EIC, would frequently join the convoys. To defend against pirate attacks, the EIC operated the Bombay Marine. These ships were an effective deterrent against small raiders but were no match for professional warships.

Seeking to threaten British trade from the beginning of the war, Napoleon ordered a French squadron to sail for India in March 1803 under the command of Counter-admiral Charles-Alexandre Léon Durand Linois. Linois's squadron included the ship of the line Marengo and three frigates. Operating from Isle de France (modern-day Mauritius), Linois was ordered to attack British shipping once war began. After sailing to Pondicherry and narrowly escaping from a British squadron under Rear-admiral Peter Rainier in July, Linois received news of the outbreak of war in May 1803 and began making preparations. He landed supplies and troops at Réunion and Batavia, sent the frigate Atalante to Muscat, captured several country ships and raided British Bencoolen. On 10 December, after gathering intelligence about the British "China Fleet", Linois set sail to intercept it. His squadron, including Marengo, the frigates Belle Poule and Sémillante, the corvette Berceau, and the Batavian Navy brig Avonturier, departed Batavia on 28 December with six months' worth of provisions, expecting a long patrol in the Strait of Malacca. The China Fleet, which gathered annually at Canton in the Pearl River, included 16 East Indiamen, 11 country ships, a Portuguese merchantmen from Macau, and a vessel from Botany Bay by late January 1804.

Despite the presence of the small EIC brig Ganges as an escort, the convoy had no real military protection, as the news of war had arrived in Canton before reinforcements could reach them. While spies in Canton informed Linois of the fleet's composition, Dutch informants also sent false reports suggesting Royal Navy warships were with the convoy, which were possibly planted by British authorities. The convoy was an incredibly valuable target, with a cargo worth over £8 million in contemporary values, including tea, silk, porcelain, and 80 Chinese plants ordered by Sir Joseph Banks for the Kew Gardens. The EIC's select committee in Canton had debated delaying the convoy's departure over security concerns. Captains of the convoy, including Henry Meriton, who had captured a French frigate in the action of 4 August 1800, argued that the convoy's size and appearance would deter attacks. However, James Farquharson, the captain of Alfred, opposed Meriton, arguing the convoy's crews were too poorly trained to defend themselves effectively. Ultimately, the committee decided to proceed, placing Commodore Nathaniel Dance—with over 45 years of experience in the East Indiaman Earl Camden—in charge of the convoy.

== Battle ==
At 08:00 on 14 February 1804, with the island of Pulo Aura within sight to the south-west near the eastern entrance to the Straits of Malacca, the Indiaman Royal George raised a signal describing three sail approaching the convoy from the direction of the island. This was Linois's squadron, which had been cruising in the area for the previous month in anticipation of the convoy's arrival. Dance ordered the brig Ganges and the Indiamen Alfred, Royal George, Bombay Castle and Hope to approach the strange vessels and investigate, rapidly discovering they were enemy warships. By 13:00, Dance had readied his guns and reformed his convoy, with the large Indiamen formed up in line of battle to receive the French attack as if they were warships. During the late afternoon, Linois's squadron fell in behind the slow line of merchant ships and Dance expected an immediate attack, but Linois was cautious and merely observed the convoy, preferring to wait until the following morning before engaging the enemy. Dance made use of the delay to gather the smaller country ships on the opposite side of his line from the French, the brig Ganges shepherding them into position and collecting volunteers from their crews to augment the sailors on board the Indiamen. Linois later excused his delay in attacking the merchant convoy by citing the need for caution:

If the bold front put on by the enemy in the daytime had been intended as a ruse to conceal his weakness, he would have profited by the darkness of the night to endeavour to conceal his escape; and in that case should have taken advantage of his manoeuvres. But I soon became convinced that this security was not feigned; three of his ships constantly kept their lights up, and the fleet continued to lie to, in order of battle, throughout the night. This position facilitated my gaining the wind, and enabled me to observe the enemy closely.

— Linois, quoted in translation in William James' The Naval History of Great Britain during the French Revolutionary and Napoleonic Wars, Volume 3, 1827.

At dawn on 15 February, both the British and the French raised their colours. Dance hoped to persuade Linois that his ships included some fully armed warships and he therefore ordered the brig Ganges and the four lead ships to hoist blue ensigns, while the rest of the convoy raised red ensigns. By the system of national flags then in use in British ships, this implied that the ships with blue ensigns were warships attached to Rainer's squadron, while the others were merchant ships under their protection. Dance was unknowingly assisted by the information that had reached Linois at Batavia, which claimed that there were 23 merchant ships and the brig in the convoy. Dance had collected six additional ships during his journey, and the identity of these were unknown to the French, who assumed that at least some of the unidentified vessels must be warships, particularly as several vessels had been recently painted at Canton to resemble ships of the line.

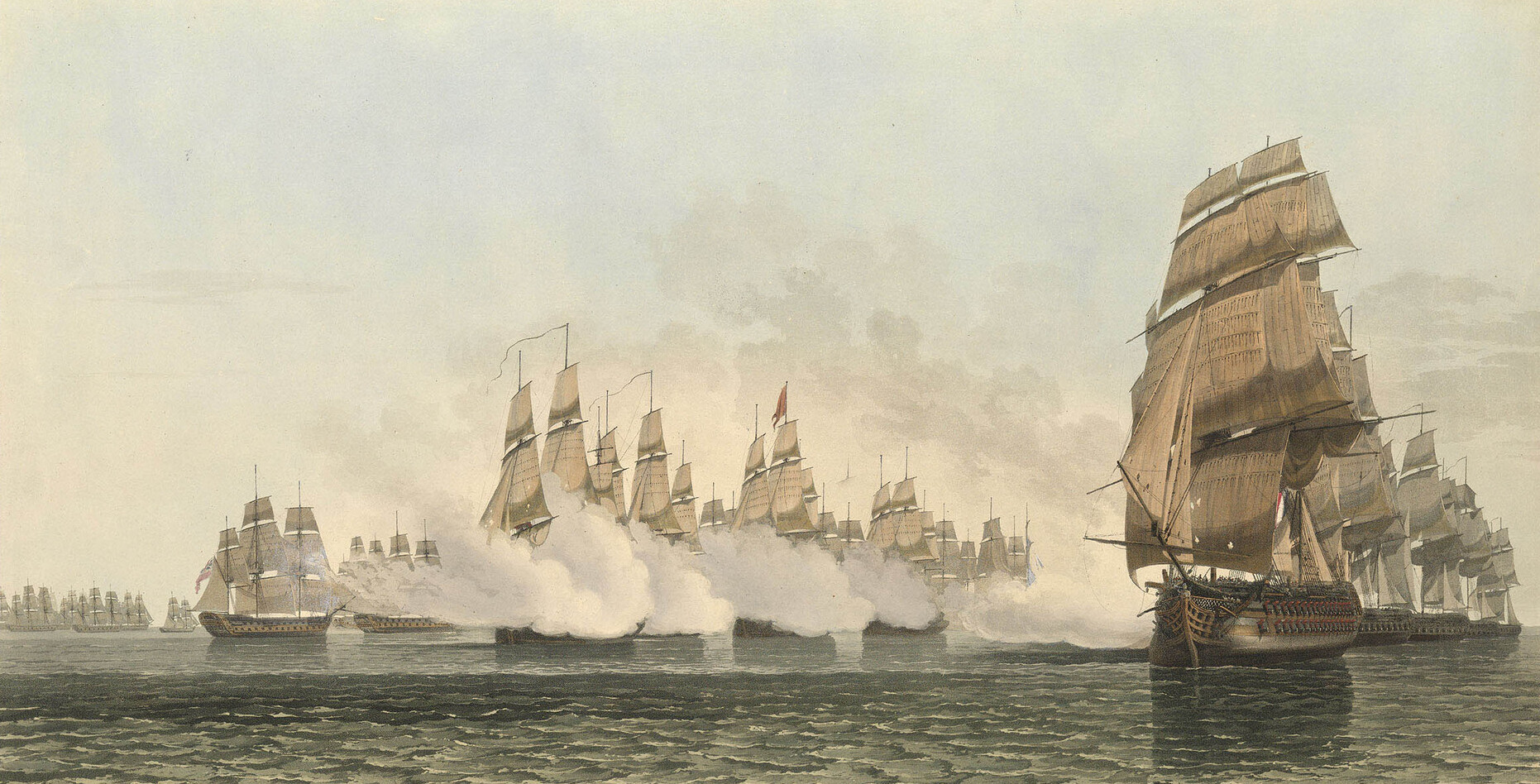
Defeat of Adml. Linois by Commodore Dance, Feby. 15th. 1804, William Daniell

At 09:00 Linois was still only observing the convoy, reluctant to attack until he could be sure of the nature of his opponents. Dance responded to the reprieve by reforming the line of battle into sailing formation to increase his convoy's speed with the intention of reaching the Straits ahead of Linois. With the convoy a less intimidating target, Linois began to slowly approach the British ships. By 13:00 it was clear that Linois's faster ships were in danger of isolating the rear of the convoy, and Dance ordered his lead ships to tack and come about so they would cross in front of the French squadron. The British successfully executed the manoeuvre, and at 13:15 Linois opened fire on the lead ship—Royal George—under the command of John Fam Timmins. The Royal George and the next four ships in line, the Indiaman Ganges, Dance's Earl Camden, the Warley and the Alfred, all returned fire, Ganges initially attacking Royal George in error. Captain James Prendergrass in Hope, the next in line, was so eager to join the battle that he misjudged his speed and collided with Warley, the ships falling back as their crews worked to separate their rigging. Shots were then exchanged at long range for 43 minutes, neither side inflicting severe damage.

Royal George had a sailor named Hugh Watt killed, another man wounded, and suffered some damage to her hull. None of the other British ships or any of the French reported anything worse than superficial damage in the engagement. At 14:00, Linois abandoned the action and ordered his squadron to haul away with the wind and sail eastwards, away from the convoy, under all sail. Determined to maintain the pretence of the presence of warships, Dance ordered the ships flying naval ensigns, including his flagship Earl Camden, to chase the French. None of the merchant ships could match the French speed, but an attempt at a chase would hopefully dissuade the French from returning. For two hours, Dance's squadron followed Linois, Hope coming close to catching Avonturier but ultimately unable to overtake the brig. At 16:00, Dance decided to gather his scattered ships and return to his former heading rather than risk attack from other raiders or lose sight of his convoy in the darkness. By 20:00, the entire British convoy had anchored at the entrance to the Straits of Malacca. On 28 February, the British ships of the line HMS Sceptre and Albion joined them in the Strait and conducted them safely to Saint Helena in the South Atlantic.

There HMS Plantagenet escorted the convoy to England. Five whalers and Carmarthen, Captain Doree, also joined the convoy, with the Blackhouse, from coast of Guinea, joining at sea. (Note: The five whalers were the William Fenning, Brook Watson, Thomas (or Young Tom), Betsey and Eliza.) The convoy returned to England without further incident.

Linois's squadron reached Batavia several days after the action without encountering any British ships. He was there joined by Atalante and, after taking on supplies, made sail for Isle de France, arriving on 2 April. Avonturier was left at Batavia and remained there until British forces raided the port in November 1806, destroying her. Linois later attempted to explain his conduct during the engagement:

The ships which had tacked rejoined those which were engaging us, and three of the engaging ships manoeuvred to double our rear, while the remainder of the fleet, crowding sail and bearing up, evinced an intention to surround us. By this manoeuvre the enemy would have rendered my situation very dangerous. The superiority of his force was ascertained, and I had no longer to deliberate on the part I should take to avoid the consequence of an unequal engagement: profiting by the smoke, I hauled up to port, and steering east-north-east, I increased by distance from the enemy, who continued the pursuit of the squadron for three hours, discharging at it several broadsides.

— Linois, quoted in translation in William James' The Naval History of Great Britain during the French Revolutionary and Napoleonic Wars, Volume 3, 1827.

=== Orders of battle ===
Honourable East India Company China Fleet
Ship	Commander	Notes
Earl Camden	Commodore Nathaniel Dance	Flagship of the convoy. Engaged for 25 minutes
Warley	Captain Henry Wilson	Engaged for 15 minutes.
Alfred	Captain James Farquharson	Engaged for 15 minutes.
Royal George	Captain John Fam Timins	Engaged for 40 minutes. Suffered light damage, with one man killed and one wounded.
Coutts	Captain Robert Torin	
Wexford	Captain William Stanley Clarke	
Ganges	Captain William Moffat	Engaged for 35 minutes.
Exeter	Captain Henry Meriton	
Earl of Abergavenny	Captain John Wordsworth	
Henry Addington	Captain John Kirkpatrick	
Bombay Castle	Captain Archibald Hamilton	
Cumberland	Captain William Ward Farrer	
Hope	Captain James Prendergrass	
Dorsetshire	Captain Robert Hunter Brown	
Warren Hastings	Captain Thomas Larkins	
Ocean	Captain John Christian Lochner	
Eleven country ships, none of which would engage the French, accompanied the convoy: Lord Castlereagh, Carron, David Scott, Minerva, Ardeseer, Charlotte, Friendship, Shau Kissaroo, Jahaungeer, Gilwell and Neptune. The EIC armed brig Ganges also joined the convoy. A Portuguese vessel from Macau and the Rolla from Botany Bay in New South Wales were supposed to join the convoy but they missed the fleet sailing and never joined.
Source: London Gazette

Admiral Linois's squadron
Ship	Guns	Commander	Notes
Marengo	74	Counter-admiral Charles-Alexandre Léon Durand Linois; Captain Joseph-Marie Vrignaud	In his after-action report, Dance noted that upon arriving at Malacca he was informed that Marengo mounted 84 guns.
Belle Poule	40	Captain Alain-Adélaïde-Marie Bruilhac	
Sémillante	32	Captain Léonard-Bernard Motard	
Berceau	30	Captain Emmanuel Halgan	Dance was also informed Berceau was a 28-gun corvette.
Avonturier	18	Unknown	Dance was informed that the ship was actually the 18-gun brig William (in actuality a 24-gun corvette).
Source: James, Vol. 3, p. 248; Clowes, p. 336

== Aftermath ==
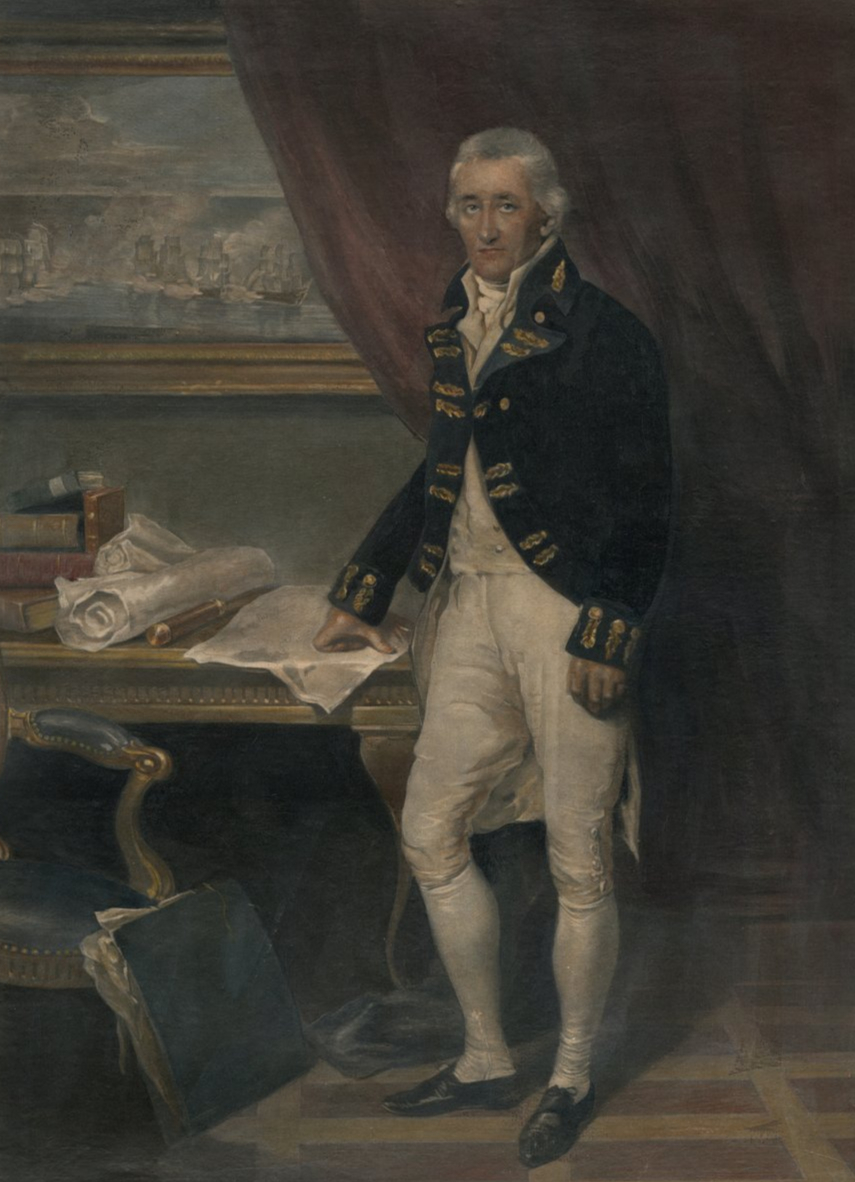
1805 portrait of Dance made after his victory

Nathaniel Dance and his fellow captains were highly praised in the aftermath of the battle: in saving the convoy they had prevented both the EIC and Lloyd's of London from likely financial ruin, the repercussions of which would have had profound effects across the British Empire. The various commanders and their crews were presented with a £50,000 prize fund to be divided among them, and the Lloyd's Patriotic Fund and other national and mercantile institutions made a series of awards of ceremonial swords, silver plate and monetary gifts to individual officers. Lloyd's Patriotic Fund gave each captain a sword worth £50, and one to Royal Navy Lieutenant Robert Merrick Fowler, travelling as a passenger on Earl Camden, and one worth £100 to Nathaniel Dance.

Dance was specifically rewarded, receiving royal recognition when he was made a Knight Bachelor by King George III. He was also personally presented with the sum of £5,000 by the Bombay Insurance Company and an additional £500 a year for life by the EIC. Dance immediately retired from the sea to Enfield Town, where he died in 1827. He refused to take full credit for the survival of the convoy, writing in reply to the award from the Bombay Insurance Company:

Placed, by the adventitious circumstances of seniority of service and absence of convoy, in the chief command of the fleet intrusted to my care, it has been my good fortune to have been enabled, by the firmness of those by whom I was supported, to perform my trust not only with fidelity, but without loss to my employers. Public opinion and public rewards have already far outrun my deserts; and I cannot but be sensible that the liberal spirit of my generous countrymen has measured what they are pleased to term their grateful sense of my conduct, rather by the particular utility of the exploit, than by any individual merit I can claim.

— Nathaniel Dance, quoted in William James' The Naval History of Great Britain during the French Revolutionary and Napoleonic Wars, Volume 3, 1827.

Among the passengers on the Indiamen were a number of Royal Navy personnel, survivors of the shipwreck of the exploratory vessel HMS Porpoise off the coast of New South Wales the previous year. This party—carried aboard Ganges, Royal George and Earl Camden—volunteered to assist the gun teams aboard their ships and Dance specifically thanked them in his account of the action. One was Lieutenant Robert Merrick Fowler, the former commander of Porpoise, who distinguished himself in a variety of capacities during the engagement. Some of the party had influential careers in the Navy, including the naval architect James Inman, who sailed on Warley, and John Franklin, who later became a polar explorer.

Linois continued his raiding, achieving some success against individual sailing ships, but failing to press successfully his numerical superiority against British naval forces; most notably at the Battle of Vizagapatam on 15 September 1804 and the action of 6 August 1805. Ironically, Linois was eventually captured at the action of 13 March 1806 after mistaking a squadron of British ships of the line for a merchant convoy in the mid-Atlantic. Linois was concerned throughout the engagement for the safety of his ships: with the nearest dockyard over 3,000 nmi (3,500 mi; 5,600 km) away at Isle de France, he could not afford to suffer severe damage to his rigging or masts that would leave his squadron crippled. He also sought to defend his behaviour off Pulo Aura with the claim that the British convoy was protected by as many as eight ships of the line, and that he had performed heroically in saving his squadron from this overwhelming force.

Subsequent historians have ridiculed this latter statement: William James wryly commented in his account of the action, written in 1827, that "it would be uncharitable to call into question the courage of Rear-admiral Linois" and William Laird Clowes said in 1900 that "his timidity and want of enterprise threw away a great opportunity". Nicholas A. M. Rodger, writing in 2004, was even more critical, insisting that "his [Linois's] officers do not seem to have been fooled, and it is extremely difficult to believe that he was." He goes on to suggest that no experienced seaman could possibly have mistaken a poorly manned and poorly trained merchant crew for the crew of a real British ship of the line, concluding that "Linois had thrown away a prize worth at least £8 million through mere timidity". The most scathing criticism of Linois's conduct came from Napoleon himself, who wrote to Minister of the Marine Denis Decrès on the subject, stating:

All the enterprises at sea which have been undertaken since I became the head of the Government have missed fire because my admirals see double and have discovered, I know not how or where, that war can be made without running risks ... Tell Linois that he has shown want of courage of mind, that kind of courage which I consider the highest quality in a leader.

— Napoleon, quoted in translation in William Laird Clowes' The Royal Navy: A History from the Earliest Times to 1900, Volume 5, 1900.

== See also ==
- Frederick Marryat's 1832 novel Newton Forster
- Patrick O'Brian's 1973 novel HMS Surprise
