= John Farquhar =

John Farquhar may refer to:

- John Farquhar (gunpowder dealer) (1751–1826), British arms dealer, briefly owner of Fonthill Abbey
- John Farquhar (American football) (born 1972), American football tight end
- John Farquhar (Australian cricketer) (1887–1977), Australian cricketer
- John Farquhar (Scottish cricketer) (1904–1984)
- John Farquhar (footballer) (born 1924), Scottish footballer
- John McCreath Farquhar (1832–1918), United States Representative from New York and recipient of the Medal of Honor
- John Hanson Farquhar (1818–1873), United States Representative from Indiana
- J. N. Farquhar (John Nicol Farquhar, 1861–1929), Scottish missionary in India
