= Lo-fi music =

Music aesthetic

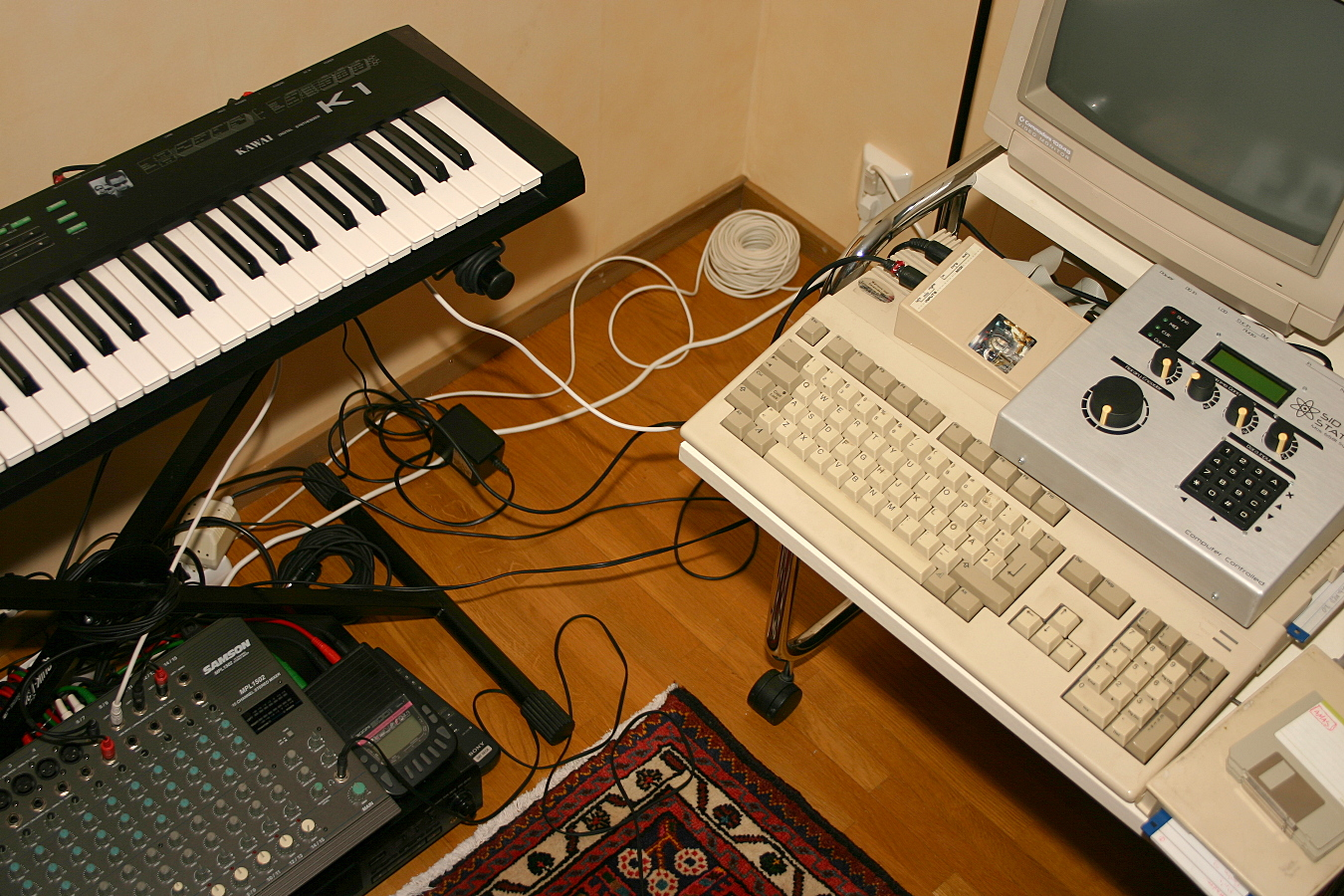
A minimal bedroom studio set-up with 1980s–1990s equipment

Low fidelity (commonly known as lo-fi, also typeset as lofi or low-fi) is a music or production quality in which elements usually regarded as imperfections in the context of a recording or performance are present, sometimes as a deliberate stylistic choice. The standards of sound quality/ fidelity and music production have evolved over the decades, meaning that some older examples of lo-fi may not have been originally recognized as such. Lo-fi began to be recognized as a style of popular music in the 1990s, when it became alternately referred to as DIY music (from "do it yourself"). Some subsets of lo-fi music have become popular for their perceived nostalgic or relaxing qualities, which originate from the imperfections that define the genre.

Traditionally, lo-fi has been characterized by the inclusion of elements normally viewed as undesirable in most professional contexts, such as misplayed notes, environmental interference, or phonographic imperfections (degraded audio signals, tape hiss, and so on). Pioneering, influential, or otherwise significant artists and bands include the Beach Boys (Smiley Smile and Wild Honey), R. Stevie Moore (often called "the godfather of home recording"), Paul McCartney (McCartney), Todd Rundgren, Sly and the Family Stone (There's a Riot Goin' On), Lee "Scratch" Perry, Peter Ivers, Jandek, Daniel Johnston, Neutral Milk Hotel, Guided by Voices, Sebadoh, Beck, Pavement, and Ariel Pink.

Although "lo-fi" has been in the cultural lexicon for approximately as long as "high fidelity", WFMU disc jockey William Berger is usually credited with popularizing the term in 1986. At various points since the 1980s, "lo-fi" has been connected with cassette culture, the DIY ethos of punk, primitivism, outsider music, authenticity, slacker/Generation X stereotypes, and cultural nostalgia. The notion of "bedroom" musicians expanded following the rise of modern digital audio workstations, leading to the invention of the nearly synonymous term bedroom pop. In the late 2000s, lo-fi aesthetics served as the basis of the chillwave and hypnagogic pop music genres. The 2010s saw the emergence of the chillout-influenced lofi hip-hop style, which gained widespread popularity on YouTube.

== Definitions and etymology ==
=== Evolution of the term and its scope ===
Lo-fi is the opposite of high fidelity, or "hi-fi". The perception of "lo-fi" has been relative to technological advances and the expectations of music listeners, causing the rhetoric and discourse surrounding the term to shift numerous times throughout its history. Usually spelled as "low-fi" before the 1990s, the term has existed since at least the 1950s, shortly after the acceptance of "high fidelity", and its definition evolved continuously between the 1970s and 2000s. In the 1976 edition of the Oxford English Dictionary, lo-fi was added under the definition of "sound production less good in quality than 'hi-fi'". Music educator R. Murray Schafer, in the glossary for his 1977 book The Tuning of the World, defined the term as "unfavourable signal-to-noise ratio."

At its most crudely sketched, lo-fi was primitivist and realist in the 1980s, postmodern in the 1990s, and archaicist in the 2000s.

— Adam Harper, Lo-Fi Aesthetics in Popular Music Discourse (2014)

There was virtually no appreciation for the imperfections of lo-fi music among critics until the 1980s, during which there was an emergent romanticism for home-recording and "do-it-yourself" (DIY) qualities. Afterward, "DIY" was often used interchangeably with "lo-fi". By the end of the 1980s, qualities such as "home-recorded", "technically primitive", and "inexpensive equipment" were commonly associated with the "lo-fi" label, and throughout the 1990s, such ideas became central to how "lo-fi" was popularly understood. Consequently, in 2003, the Oxford Dictionary added a second definition for the term—"a genre of rock music characterized by minimal production, giving a raw and unsophisticated sound".

The identity of the party or parties who popularized the use of "lo-fi" cannot be determined definitively. It is generally suggested that the term was popularized through William Berger's weekly half-hour radio show on the New Jersey–based independent radio station WFMU, titled Low-Fi, which lasted from 1986 to 1987. The program's contents consisted entirely of contributions solicited via mail and ran during a thirty-minute prime time evening slot every Friday. In the fall 1986 issue of the WFMU magazine LCD, the program was described as "home recordings produced on inexpensive equipment. Technical primitivism coupled with brilliance."

A third definition was added to the Oxford Dictionary in 2008: "unpolished, amateurish, or technologically unsophisticated, esp. as a deliberate aesthetic choice." In 2017, About.com's Anthony Carew argued that the term "lo-fi" had been commonly misused as a synonym for "warm" or "punchy" when it should be reserved for music that "sounds like it's recorded onto a broken answering-machine".

=== Bedroom pop ===
Daniel Wray of The Guardian defined the term in 2020 as a genre of home-recorded music with a "dreamy, introspective and intimate" sound, and one which spans "across indie, pop, R&B and emo". Jenessa Williams of The Forty-Five called "bedroom pop" almost synonymous with "lo-fi", having been traditionally used as "a flattering way to dress up homespun demos and slacker aesthetics" before being recontextualized in later years as "midwestern emo without the thrashing [and] Soundcloud rap without the braggadocio."

"Bedroom pop" has been invoked to describe a distinct aesthetic. Writing in 2006, Tammy LaGorce of The New York Times identified "bedroom pop" as "bloglike music that tries to make the world a better place through a perfect homemade song". By the 2010s, journalists would apply the term to any music with a "fuzzy" production quality.

The lineage of the term has also been traced by music researchers to earlier historical home-recording nomenclature. In a 2022 cultural report published by Fundación Alternativas, academics Héctor Fouce and Elena Rosillo noted that the "origin of bedroom pop can be traced back to the Bedroom Tapes that Brian Wilson, leader of The Beach Boys, recorded in 1967." According to their analysis, this historical linkage is actively reinforced by contemporary exponents of the genre; specifically, they highlight that Jakob Ogawa "titled his 2017 album the same way, in direct reference to Wilson, creating that link to the term's origin."

The genre has an inseparable relationship with the internet and social media platforms. Artists such as Clairo and Boy Pablo gained more recognition due to the virality of their DIY music videos on YouTube. The term bedroom pop became legitimized as a descriptor in recent time with the creation of Spotify's Bedroom Pop playlist.

Many of the associated artists have rejected the label. Clairo when asked about her music being labeled bedroom pop stated "I kind of feel like it can be limiting because I want to progress and I want to make things that are higher quality. I wanna make music that's meant to be heard". In a 2025 interview with Cero Magazine, Cuco said that bedroom pop "-was just the label of the internet, but I've definitely grown from that" adding "I guess we were just all making music in our bedrooms, but as production started increasing, we've all kind of established ourselves as artists".

== Characteristics ==
Lo-fi aesthetics are idiosyncrasies associated with the recording process. More specifically, those that are generally viewed in the field of audio engineering as undesirable effects, such as a degraded audio signal or fluctuations in tape speed. The aesthetic may also extend to substandard or disaffected musical performances. Recordings deemed unprofessional or "amateurish" are usually with respect to performance (out-of-tune or out-of-time notes) or mixing (audible hiss, distortion, or room acoustics). Musicologist Adam Harper identifies the difference as "phonographic" and "non-phonographic imperfections". He defines the former as "elements of a recording that are perceived (or imagined to be perceived) as detrimental to it and that originate in the specific operation of the recording medium itself. Today, they are usually the first characteristics people think about when the subject of 'lo-fi' is brought up."

Recording imperfections may "fall loosely into two categories, distortion and noise", in Harper's view, although he acknowledges that definitions of "distortion" and "noise" vary and sometimes overlap. The most prominent form of distortion in lo-fi aesthetics is harmonic distortion, which can occur when an audio signal is amplified beyond the dynamic range of a device. However, this effect is not usually considered to be an imperfection. The same process is used for the electric guitar sounds of rock and roll, and since the advent of digital recording, to give a recording a feeling of "analogue warmth". Distortion that is generated as a byproduct of the recording process ("phonographic distortion") is typically avoided in professional contexts. "Tape saturation" and "saturation distortion" alternately describe the harmonic distortion that occurs when a tape head approaches its limit of residual magnetization (a common aspect of tape recorder maintenance that is fixed with degaussing tools). Effects include a decrease in high-frequency signals and an increase in noise. Generally, lo-fi recordings are likely to have little or no frequency information above 10 kilohertz.

"Non-phonographic" imperfections may involve noises that are generated by the performance ("coughing, sniffing, page-turning and chair sounds") or the environment ("passing vehicles, household noises, the sounds of neighbours and animals"). Harper acknowledges that the "appreciation of distortion and noise is not limited to lo-fi aesthetics, of course, and lo-fi aesthetics ... does not extend to all appreciations for distortion and noise. The difference lies in the ways in which distortion and noise are understood to be imperfections in lo-fi." He also distinguishes between "recording imperfections" and "sonic imperfections [that] occur as a result of imperfect sound-reproduction or - modulation equipment... Hypothetically, at least, lo-fi effects are created during recording and production itself, and perceptibly remain in master recordings that are then identically copied for release."

Bruce Bartlett, in his 2013 guide Practical Recording Techniques, states that "lo-fi sounds might have a narrow frequency response (a thin, cheap sound), and might include noise such as hiss or record scratches. They could be distorted or wobbly in pitch." He offers the following methods for replicating lo-fi sounds: mixing levels so that they are unbalanced; placing obstructions between a microphone and the sound sources; placing the microphone in an unusual spot, such as in a wastebasket; recording with older, lower-quality instruments or equipment; and highlighting spill and sound reflections.

== History ==
=== 1950s–1970s: Origins and influential works ===
DIY music predates written history, but "lo-fi" as it was understood after the 1990s can be traced to 1950s rock and roll. AllMusic writes that the genre's recordings were made "cheaply and quickly, often on substandard equipment. In that sense, the earliest rock & roll records, most of the garage rock of the '60s, and much of the punk rock of the late '70s could be tagged as Lo-Fi."

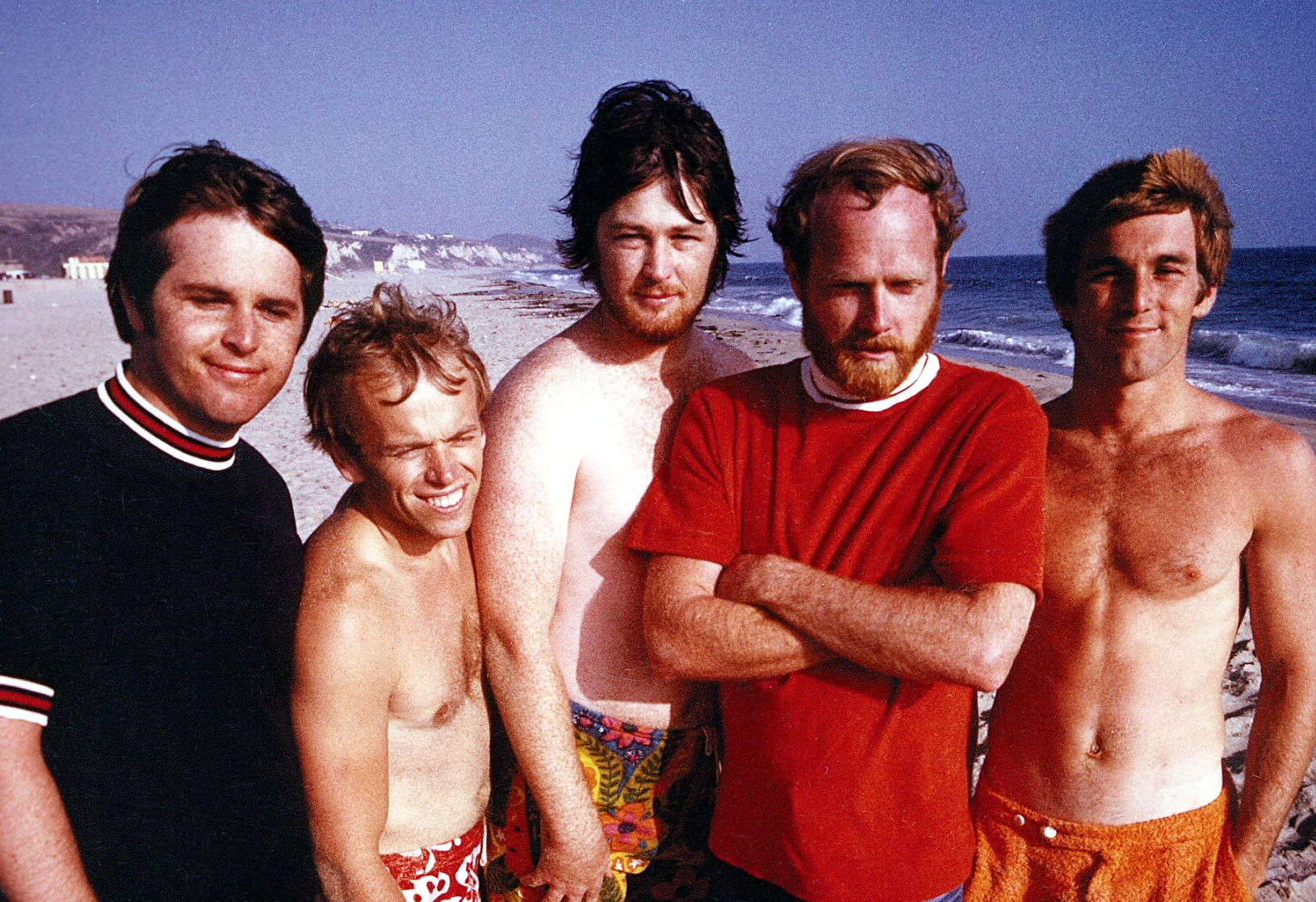
The Beach Boys (pictured in 1967) recorded albums at Brian Wilson's home studio from 1967 to 1972.

Released in 1967, the Beach Boys' albums Smiley Smile and Wild Honey were lo-fi albums recorded mostly in Brian Wilson's makeshift home studio; the albums were later referred to as part of Wilson's so-called Bedroom Tapes. Although Smiley Smile was initially met with confusion and disappointment, appreciation for the album grew after other artists released albums that reflected a similarly flawed and stripped-down quality, including Bob Dylan's John Wesley Harding (1967) and the Beatles' White Album (1968). Pitchfork writer Mark Richardson credited Smiley Smile with inventing "the kind of lo-fi bedroom pop that would later propel Sebadoh, Animal Collective, and other characters." Editors at Rolling Stone credited Wild Honey with originating "the idea of DIY pop".

In the early 1970s, there were a few other major recording artists and bands who released music recorded with portable multi-tracking equipment; examples included Paul McCartney, Todd Rundgren, and Bob Marley and the Wailers. Produced shortly after the Beatles' break-up, the home-recorded solo release McCartney was among the best-selling albums of 1970, but was critically panned. In 2005, after an interviewer suggested that it was possibly "one of the first big lo-fi records of its day", McCartney commented that it was "interesting" that younger fans were "looking back at something like that with some kind of respect", before adding that the album's "sort of ... hippie simplicity ... kind of resonates at this point in time, somehow."

Something/Anything? (released in February 1972) was recorded almost entirely by Rundgren alone. The album included many of his best-known songs, as well as a spoken-word track ("Intro") in which he teaches the listener about recording flaws for an egg hunt-type game he calls "Sounds of the Studio". He used the money gained from the album's success to build a personal recording studio in New York, where he recorded the less successful 1973 follow-up A Wizard, a True Star. Musicologist Daniel Harrison compared the Beach Boys' late-1960s albums to Wizard, a record "which mimics aspects of Brian's compositional style in its abrupt transitions, mixture of various pop styles, and unusual production effects. The commercial failure of the Beach Boys' experiments was hardly motivation for imitation." In 2018, Pitchfork's Sam Sodsky noted that the "fingerprints" of Wizard remain "evident on bedroom auteurs to this day".

Jamaican record producer Lee "Scratch" Perry is often noted as one of few major record producers of the early to late 1970s to embrace lo-fi aesthetics and deliberately include tape distortion and recording artifacts into his productions. Commenting on Perry's low fidelity aesthetic, filmmaker Jeremy Marre noted in his 1979 documentary Roots Rock Reggae: "To other people's standards, the instruments may sound distorted, the balance way off. But it's just these rough edges that give Reggae the sound they can never copy abroad." Perry's distinct production style, which throughout most of the 1970s solely utilized the recording capabilities of a consumer tape deck in his home studio, was sought out by several musicians and bands, most notably Bob Marley and the Wailers, Linda and Paul McCartney, The Clash, John Lydon, Robert Palmer, Simply Red, Junior Murvin, and The Congos, whom he worked with in his Black Ark recording studio. Later in his career, Perry's lo-fi production techniques were recognized by musicians and critics as an influence on the aesthetics of electronica, punk rock, and hip-hop.

Among other notable examples, writers of The Wire credit Skip Spence's Oar (1969) as "a progenitor of both the loner/stoner and lo-fi movements", adding that the album "would not find a real audience for decades." Record Collector's Jamie Atkins wrote in 2018 that many lo-fi acts would be indebted to the reverb-saturated sound of the Beach Boys' 1970 song "All I Wanna Do". Pitchfork writer Madison Bloom crowned Peter Ivers, a 1970s Los Angeles musician, as "the weirdo king of bedroom pop, decades before the genre existed." In 2016, Billboard writer Joe Lynch described David Bowie's Hunky Dory (1971) as "pretty much the blueprint for every lo-fi indie pop album of the last 25 years", citing Ariel Pink as a descendant. Active since 1969, Stavely Makepeace, and their spinoff group Lieutenant Pigeon, were described by AllMusic's Richie Unterberger as creating "quirky, slightly lo-fi homemade production married to simple pop songs with heavy echoes of both '50s rock & roll and British novelty music." Michael Heatley of Record Collector describes Wizzard's debut album Wizzard Brew (1973) as "lo-fi, retro rock'n'roll".

=== 1970s–1980s: Indie, cassette culture, and outsider music ===
With the emergence of punk rock and new wave in the late 1970s, some sectors of popular music began to espouse a DIY ethos that heralded a wave of independent labels, distribution networks, fanzines and recording studios, and many guitar bands were formed on the then-novel premise that one could record and release their own music instead of having to procure a record contract from a major label. Lo-fi musicians and fans were predominantly white, male and middle-class, and while most of the critical discourse interested in lo-fi was based in New York or London, the musicians themselves were largely from lesser metropolitan areas of the US.

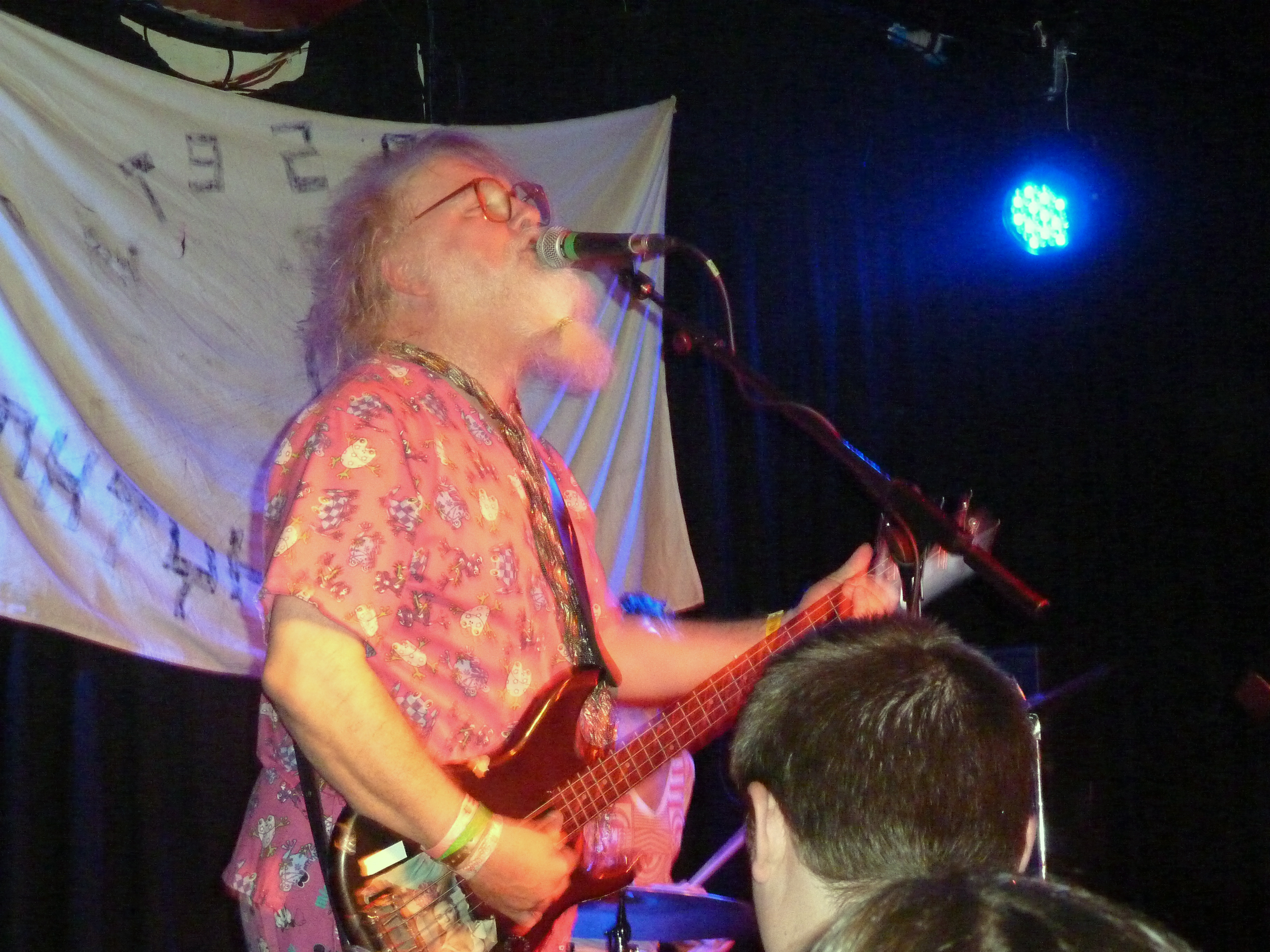
R. Stevie Moore (pictured in 2011) is frequently referred to as the "godfather" of home recording.

Since 1968, R. Stevie Moore had been recording full-length albums on reel-to-reel tape in his parents' basement in Tennessee, but it was not until 1976's Phonography that any of his recordings were issued on a record label. The album achieved some notoriety among New York's punk and new wave circles. Matthew Ingram of The Wire wrote that "Moore might not have been the first rock musician to go entirely solo, recording every part from drums to guitar ... However, he was the first to explicitly aestheticize the home recording process itself ... making him the great-grandfather of lo-fi." Asked if he supported the "DIY/lo-fi pioneer label", Moore explained that his approach resulted from "happenstance" rather than a calculated artistic decision, although he agreed that he "should be recognized as a pioneer". When a 2006 New York Times reporter referenced Moore as the progenitor of "bedroom pop", Moore responded that the notion was "hilarious" in light of his "bitter struggle to make a living and get some notoriety, I scoff at it."

In 1979, Tascam introduced the Portastudio, the first portable multi-track recorder of its kind to incorporate an "all-in-one" approach to overdubbing, mixing, and bouncing. This technology allowed a broad range of musicians from underground circles to build fan bases through the dissemination of their cassette tapes. Music critic Richie Unterberger cited Moore as "one of the most famous" of the "few artists in cassetteland [that] established a reputation, if even a cult one." From 1979 until the early 1980s, Moore was a staff member on WFMU, hosting a weekly "Bedroom Radio" show. Berger's "Low-Fi" program followed thereafter and effectively established lo-fi as a distinct movement associated with the spirit of punk. JW Farquhar's home-recorded 1973 album The Formal Female, according to critic Ned Raggett, could also be regarded as a forerunner to "any number of" independent lo-fi artists, including R. Stevie Moore and the underground Texas musician Jandek.

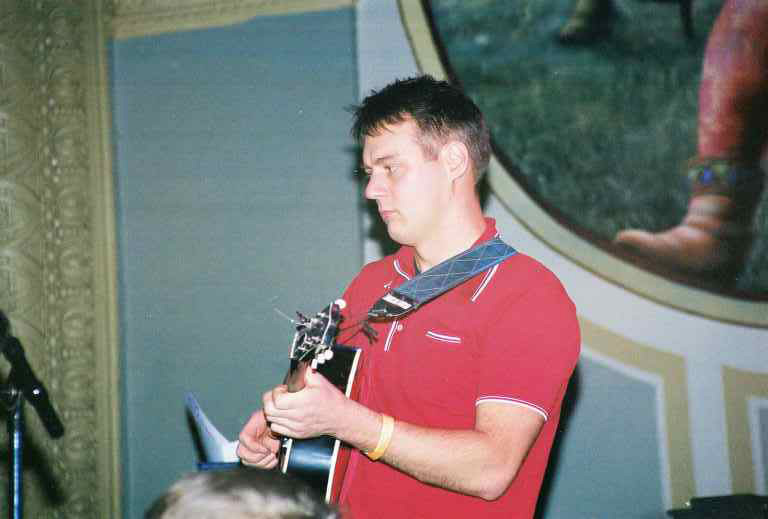
Calvin Johnson (pictured c. 2000s), founder of K Records and co-founder of Beat Happening

In 1980, the Welsh trio Young Marble Giants released their only album, Colossal Youth, featuring stark instrumentation, including a primitive drum machine, and a decidedly "bedroom" aura. Davyd Smith of the Evening Standard later wrote, "It's hard to imagine a more lo-fi, unambitious sound." Throughout the following decade, the indie rock spheres of the American underground (bands such as college radio favorite R.E.M.), along with some British post-punk bands, were the most prominent exports of lo-fi music. According to AllMusic, the stylistic variety of their music often "fluctuated from simple pop and rock songs to free-form song structures to pure noise and arty experimentalism." Similar scenes also developed among DIY cassette-trading hip-hop and hardcore punk acts. One of the most recognizable bands was Beat Happening (1984–1992) from K Records, an influential indie pop label. They were rarely known as a "lo-fi" group during their active years, and were only noted for their pioneering role in the movement after the term's definition evolved in the mid-1990s.

Elsewhere, WFMU DJ Irwin Chusid was responsible for inventing and popularizing the "outsider music" category — much of it overlapping with lo-fi. Adam Harper credits the outsider musicians Daniel Johnston and Jandek with "form[ing] a bridge between 1980s primitivism and the lo-fi indie rock of the 1990s. ... both musicians introduced the notion that lo-fi was not just acceptable but the special context of some extraordinary and brilliant musicians." Hailing from New Zealand, the Tall Dwarfs' mid-1980s records are credited with anticipating the lo-fi sound. AllMusic wrote that Tall Dwarfs' home-recorded releases presaged "the rise of what was ultimately dubbed 'lo-fi' as the sound began to grow in prominence and influence over the course of the decades to follow."

=== 1990s: Changed definitions of "lo-fi" and "indie" ===
==== Relation to "alternative" music ====
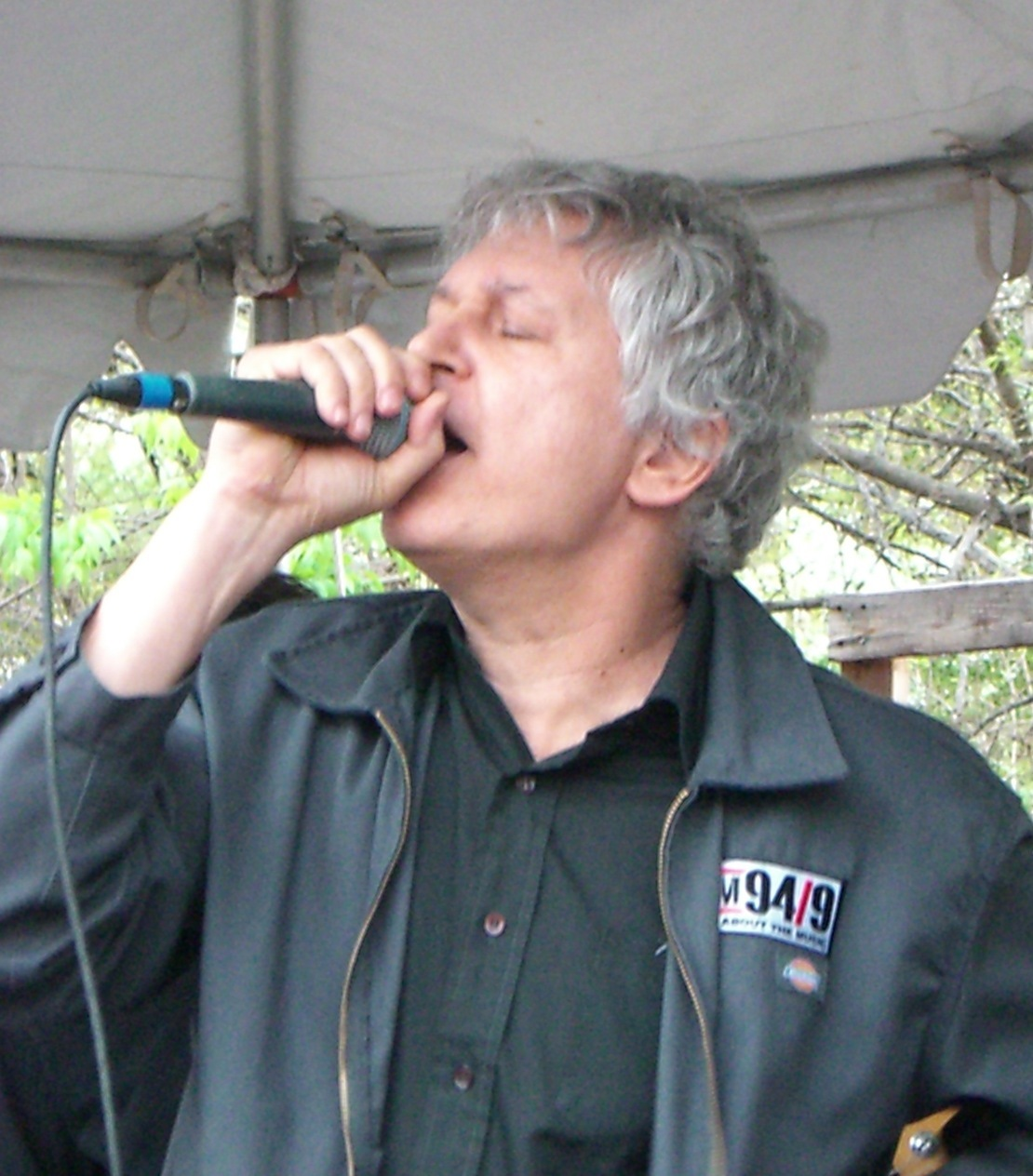
Robert Pollard of Guided by Voices (pictured in 2006)

During the 1990s, the media's usage of the word "indie" evolved from music "produced away from the music industry's largest record labels" to a particular style of rock or pop music viewed in the US as the "alternative to 'alternative'". Following the success of Nirvana's Nevermind (1991), alternative rock became a cultural talking point, and subsequently, the concept of a lo-fi movement coalesced between 1992 and 1994. Centered on artists such as Guided by Voices, Sebadoh, Beck, and Pavement, most of the writing about alternative and lo-fi aligned it with Generation X and "slacker" stereotypes that originated from Douglas Coupland's novel Generation X and Richard Linklater's film Slacker (both released 1991) which led to the genre being called "slacker rock". Some of the delineation between grunge and lo-fi came with respect to the music's "authenticity". Even though Nirvana frontman Kurt Cobain was well known for being fond of Johnston, K Records, and the Shaggs, there was a faction of indie rock that viewed grunge as a sell-out genre, believing that the imperfections of lo-fi was what gave the music its authenticity.

In April 1993, the term "lo-fi" gained mainstream currency after it was featured as a headline in The New York Times. The most widely-read article was published by the same paper in August 1994 with the headline "Lo-Fi Rockers Opt for Raw Over Slick". In contrast to a similar story ran in the paper seven years earlier, which never deployed "lo-fi" in the context of an unprofessional recording, writer Matt Deihl conflated "lo-fi" with "DIY" and "a rough sound quality". He wrote:

Alternately called lo-fi, referring to the rough sound quality resulting from such an approach, or D.I.Y., an acronym for "do it yourself", this tradition is distinguished by an aversion to state-of-the-art recording techniques. ... In a world of sterile, digitally recorded Top 40, lo-fi elucidates the raw seams of the artistic process.

The main focus in the piece was Beck and Guided by Voices, who had recently become popular acts in the indie rock subculture. Beck, whose 1994 single "Loser" was recorded in a kitchen and reached the Billboard top 10, ultimately became the most recognizable artist associated with the "lo-fi" tag. As a response to the "lo-fi" label, Guided by Voices bandleader Robert Pollard denied having any association to its supposed movement. He said that although the band was being "championed as the pioneers of the lo-fi movement," he was not familiar with the term, and explained that "[a] lot of people were picking up [Tascam] machines at the time ... Using a four-track became common enough that they had to find a category for it: DIY, lo-fi, whatever."

At the time, music critic Simon Reynolds interpreted the seeming-movement as a reaction against grunge music, "and a weak one, since lo-fi is just grunge with even grungier production values." In turn, he said, lo-fi inspired its own reaction in the form of "post-rock". A reaction against both grunge and lo-fi, according to AllMusic, was chamber pop, which drew heavily from the rich orchestrations of Brian Wilson, Burt Bacharach, and Lee Hazlewood.

==== Genre crystallization ====
"Lo-fi" was applied inconsistently throughout the 1990s. Writing in the book Hop on Pop (2003), Tony Grajeda said that by 1995, Rolling Stone magazine "managed to label every other band it featured in the first half [of the year] as somehow lo-fi." One journalist in Spin credited Sebadoh's Sebadoh III (1991) with "inventing" lo-fi, characterizing the genre as "the soft rock of punk". Additionally, virtually every journalist referenced an increasing media coverage of lo-fi music while failing to acknowledge themselves as contributors to the trend.

Several books were published that helped to "canonize" lo-fi acts, usually by comparing them favorably to older musicians. For example, Rolling Stone's Alt-Rock-a-Rama (1995) contained a chapter titled "The Lo-Fi Top 10", which mentioned Hasil Adkins, the Velvet Underground, Half Japanese, Billy Childish, Beat Happening, Royal Trux, Sebadoh, Liz Phair, Guided By Voices, Daniel Johnston, Beck and Pavement. Richie Unterberger's Unknown Legends of Rock 'n' Roll: Psychedelic Unknowns, Mad Geniuses, Punk Pioneers, Lo-Fi Mavericks & More and "the community of like-minded critics and fans surrounding him" were especially pivotal in establishing modern notions of the lo-fi aesthetic. According to Adam Harper: "In short, Unknown Legends bridges the interests of the [1980s] and the [Cassette Culture] Generation and those of [the 2000s], providing an early sketch, a portent – a 'leftfield blueprint', perhaps – of 00s movements like hauntology and hypnagogic pop".

The "lo-fi" tag also extended to acts such as the Mountain Goats, Nothing Painted Blue, Chris Knox, Alastair Galbraith, and Lou Barlow. "Other significant artists often aligned with 1990s lo-fi", Harper wrote, "such as Ween, the Grifters, Silver Jews, Liz Phair, Smog, Superchunk, Portastatic and Royal Trux have been largely omitted owing either to the comparative paucity of their reception or to its lesser relevance to lo-fi aesthetics."

From the late 1990s to 2000s, "lo-fi" was absorbed into regular indie discourse, where it mostly lost its connotations as an indie rock subcategory evoking "the slacker generation", "looseness", or "self-consciousness". Pitchfork and The Wire became the leading publications on music, while blogs and smaller websites took on the role previously occupied by fanzines.

=== 2000s: Hypnagogic pop and chillwave ===
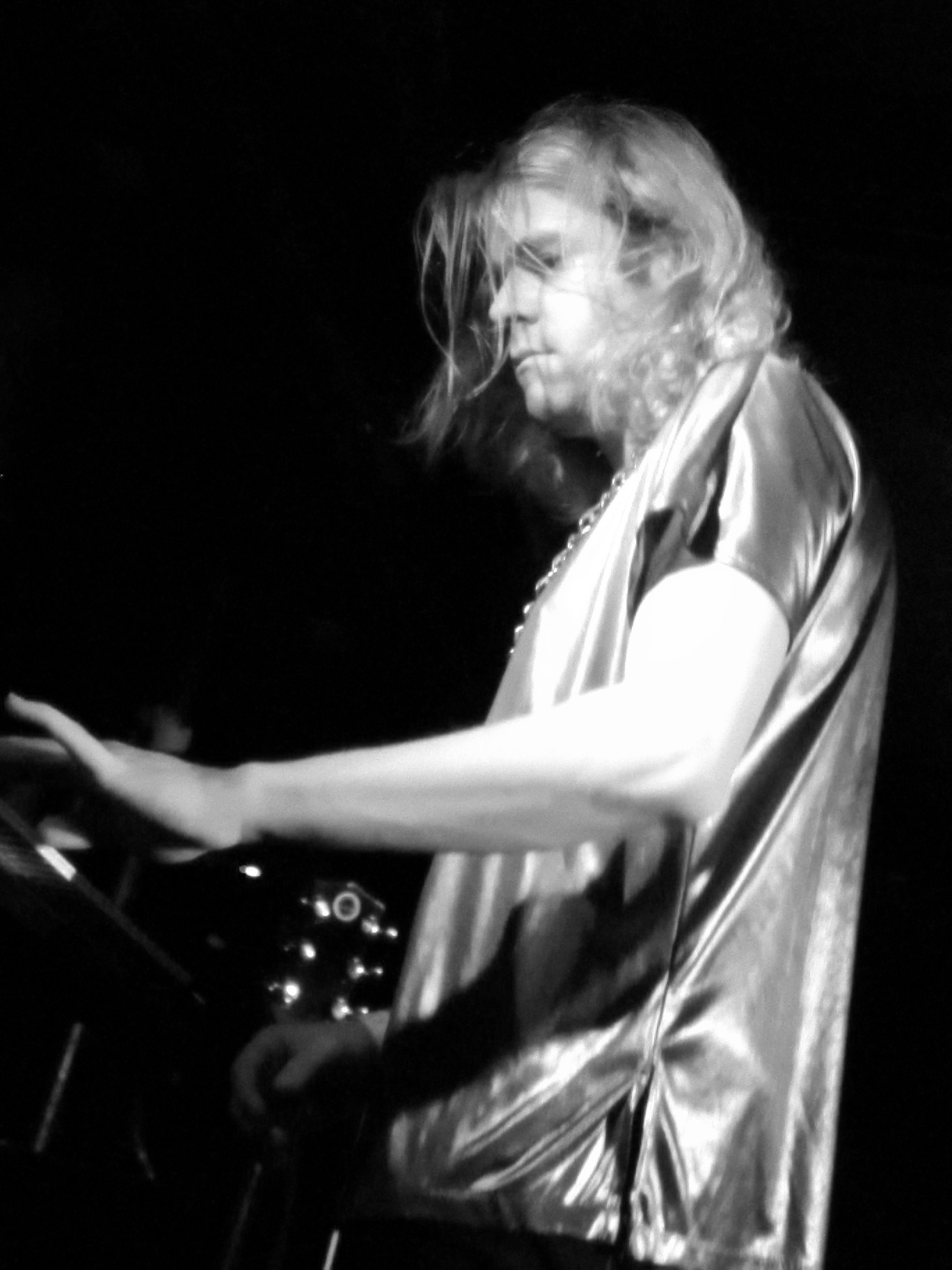
Ariel Pink performing in 2010

The rise of modern digital audio workstations dissolved a theoretical technological division between professional and non-professional artists. Many of the prominent lo-fi acts of the 1990s adapted their sound to more professional standards and "bedroom" musicians began looking toward vintage equipment as a way to achieve an authentic lo-fi aesthetic, mirroring a similar trend in the 1990s concerning the revival of 1960s space age pop and analog synthesizers. R. Stevie Moore was increasingly cited by emerging lo-fi acts as a primary influence. His most vocal advocate, Ariel Pink, had read Unknown Legends, and later recorded a cover version of one of the tracks included in a CD that came with the book ("Bright Lit Blue Skies"). At the time of his label debut, Pink was viewed as a novelty act, as there were virtually no other contemporary indie artists with a similar retro lo-fi sound.

Previous lo-fi artists generally rejected the influence of 1980s pop radio that informed most of Pink's sound. Afterward, a style of music dubbed "hypnagogic pop" emerged among lo-fi and post-noise musicians who engaged with elements of cultural nostalgia, childhood memory, and outdated recording technology. The label was invented by journalist David Keenan in an August 2009 piece for The Wire, which included Pink among his examples. Pink was frequently referred to as the "godfather" of hypnagogic, chillwave or glo-fi as new acts that were associated with him (aesthetically, personally, geographically, or professionally) attracted notice from critics. According to Pitchfork's Marc Hogan, each of those tags described what was essentially psychedelic music. Adam Harper reflected in 2013 that there was a growing tendency among critics such as Simon Reynolds to overstate Pink's influence by failing to acknowledge predecessors such as R. Stevie Moore and the Cleaners from Venus' Martin Newell.

=== 2010s: Lofi hip-hop ===
In the late 2010s, a form of downtempo music tagged as "lofi hip-hop" or "chillhop" became popular among YouTube music streamers. It combines hip-hop beats with elements of chill-out. Several of these YouTube channels attracted millions of followers. The genre tends to be deliberately unpolished and features audio imperfections, distorted sound quality, and less professional audio equipment. Lofi hip-hop originated within the underground beatmaking hip-hop scene of the 2000s, particularly after the advent of Roland SP-303 and Roland SP-404 samplers, each of which featured the "lo-fi" effect as a separate button.

The Japanese artist Nujabes, often called the "godfather of lofi hip-hop", is credited with driving lo-fi's growth with his contributions to the soundtrack for the popular anime Samurai Champloo. The 2004 MF Doom and Madlib album Madvillainy is regarded as a "shared touchstone" for lofi hip-hop. Another artist also often associated with the development of lo-fi hip-hop is Detroit rapper-producer J Dilla.

== See also ==
- List of lo-fi musicians
- Lofi girl
- Lofi hip-hop
- Slacker rock
- Home recording
- Noise reduction
- Shitgaze
- Wabi-sabi
