= ST Stella Maris =

- Name: Stella Maris
- Owner: Halifax Trading & Sealing Co (c.1917–)
- Builder: Samuda Bios
- Launched: 1882
- Type: Gunboat and minesweeper (1882–c.1917); Tugboat (c.1917–?)
- Tonnage: 229
- Length: 124.5 ft (37.9 m)
- Beam: 23.6 ft (7.2 m)
- Depth: 12.2 ft (3.7 m)

Stella Maris (from the Latin for "star of the sea") was a steamship built in 1882 as the Royal Navy gunboat HMS Starling and converted to steam tug in 1905. Stella Maris played a major role in the events of the Halifax Explosion in 1917.

Stella Maris was built in Poplar, England in 1882 by Samuda Bios as a Banterer-class gunboat, HMS Starling. The vessel was 124.5 feet (37.9 m) long, 23.6 feet (7.2 m) wide, and 12.2 feet (3.7 m) deep, and had a tonnage of 229. Starling was composite-built (wooden planks on iron frames) and armed with two 6-inch and two 3.75-inch guns. Starling was sold for merchant service in 1905.

As Stella Maris, the tug was owned by Halifax Trading & Sealing Co, run by James Augustus Farquhar.

On 6 December 1917, Stella Maris, with Captain Horatio Harris Brannen and 23 others aboard, was towing two scows near mid-channel in the Narrows of Halifax Harbour leading into Bedford Basin. Shortly before the explosion, the tug had to hastily change course to avoid the outbound SS Imo which was departing Bedford Basin. Imo then collided with Mont Blanc, a French munitions ship. The collision started a fire on Mont Blanc, forcing the crew to evacuate. The burning ship then began drifting towards Halifax's Pier 6 on the western shore. Stella Maris anchored its barges to respond to the fire and approached the burning munitions ship, spraying the flames with its fire hose. As the fire was too intense to stop with a single fire hose, the Stella Maris's crew began to prepare a towline to pull the French vessel away from Pier 6 and prevent the fire from spreading ashore. The crew were in the process of retrieving a ten-inch hawser from the hold to assist a party of volunteers from HMCS Niobe's steam pinnace in securing a line to Mont Blanc. Before this could be done, the explosion occurred.

The Halifax Explosion was the largest man-made blast prior to the Trinity test of the atomic bomb. Stella Maris was severely damaged and thrown up on the beach near Pier 6 with the bow ashore and the shattered stern submerged. Nineteen of the crew were killed, including Captain Brannen, but five managed to survive and two provided important eyewitness testimony at the investigation into the disaster. The tug was salvaged and rebuilt for service in the First World War.
