= Carmarthen (1802 ship) =

History

United Kingdom
- Name: Carmarthen
- Namesake: Carmarthen
- Owner: James Williams
- Builder: Randall, Rotherhithe
- Launched: 25 November 1802
- Fate: Last listed 1820

General characteristics
- Tons burthen: 550, or 552, or 55262/94, or 580, or 581 (bm)
- Length: Overall: 125 ft 6 1/2 in (38.3 m); Keel: 100 ft 5 in (30.6 m)
- Beam: 35 ft 2 in (10.7 m)
- Depth of hold: 15 ft 11 in (4.9 m)
- Complement: 1803: 52; 1805: 52; 1806: 52; 1808: 56
- Armament: 1803: 18 × 12-pounder carronades; 1805: 18 × 12-pounder carronades; 1806: 18 × 12-pounder carronades; 1808: 18 × 12-pounder carronades

Carmarthen was launched in 1802 as an East Indiaman. She made eight round-trip voyages to India as an "extra" ship for the British East India Company (EIC). On her first voyage she participated in an experiment in bringing variolation to India and other British possessions to combat smallpox. After leaving the EIC's employment, she took one more voyage to India, sailing under a licence from the EIC. She was last listed in 1820.

== Career ==
On 28 August 1801, the EIC hired Carmarthen as an extra ship for eight voyages at a rate of £14 per ton for 550 tons.

1st EIC voyage (1803–1804): Captain John Dobrée sailed from the Downs on 7 February 1803, bound for St Helena, Bengal, and Bencoolen. Carmarthen reached St Helena on 24 April and arrived at Calcutta on 26 August. In March war with France had broken out; Captain Dobrée received a letter of marque on 1 July. Homeward bound, she was at Saugor on 24 November. She stopped at Bencoolen on 1 February 1804 and reached St Helena on 6 June. At St Helena Carmarthen joined the EIC's returning China Fleet, fresh from its success at the battle of Pulo Aura where the Indiamen had bluffed a French naval squadron into retreat. HMS Plantagenet escorted the convoy to England. Carmarthen arrived at Long Reach on 13 August.

The visit to Bencoolen apparently was part of a program of reducing the toll of smallpox in India and other EIC possessions via variolation. Carmarthen left England with 14 orphans who had never been infected with cowpox or smallpox. Two were inoculated before Carmarthen left England, and the rest were to be inoculated on the voyage. The idea was to introduce a mild form of the disease to Fort Marlborough, and thus to extend variolation to Sumatra.

2nd EIC voyage (1805–1806): Captain John Christopher Lochner acquired a letter of marque on 21 January 1805. Captain Lochner sailed from Portsmouth on 25 March, bound for Madras and Bengal. Carmarthen reached Madeira on 25 April, and Madras on 17 July; she arrived at Diamond Harbour on 8 August. Homeward bound, she was at Saugor on 20 November, reached St Helena on 24 February 1806, and arrived back at Long Reach on 16 June.

3rd EIC voyage (1807–1808): Captain James Ross acquired a letter of marque on 20 November 1806. He sailed from Portsmouth on 4 January 1807, bound for Bombay. Carmarthen arrived at Bombay on 27 May. Homeward bound, she reached the Cape on 1 October, St Helena on 24 October, and Crookhaven on 17 December. She arrived at the Downs on 5 January 1808.

4th EIC voyage (1808–1809): Captain Ross acquired a new letter of marque on 18 June 1808. He sailed from Portsmouth on 10 June, bound for Bombay. Carmarthen reached Madeira on 24 June, and arrived at Bombay on 29 October. She left Bombay on 19 April 1809, reached St Helena on 12 July, and arrived at Lower Hope on 13 September.

5th EIC voyage (1810–1812): Captain Ross sailed from Portsmouth on 11 May 1810, bound for Bombay. Carmarthen reached Madeira on 27 May and arrived at Bombay on 5 October. The British had just captured Île de France and Carmarthen sailed there, arriving at Mauritius on 16 June 1811. She arrived back at Bombay on 22 May. Homeward bound she was at the Cape on 18 October, reached St Helena on 5 November, and arrived back at Gravesend on 27 January 1812.

6th EIC voyage (1812–1814): Captain Ross sailed from Portsmouth on 4 June 1812, bound for Madeira and Bengal. Carmarthen reached Madeira on 18 June and arrived at Calcutta on 26 December. Homeward bound, she was at Saugor on 17 March 1813, and reached Bombay on 4 June. She then reached the Cape on 3 January 1814 and St Helena on 25 February, and arrived at the Downs on 21 May 1814.

7th EIC voyage (1815–1816): Captain Ross sailed from the Downs on 22 May 1815, bound for Bombay. Carmarthen reached Madeira on 10 June and Mauritius on 28 September, before arriving at Bombay on 8 November. Homeward bound, she was at Tellicherry on 22 February 1816 and the Cape on 13 May. She reached St Helena on 11 June and arrive at Gravesend on 16 August.

8th EIC voyage (1817–1818): Captain Ross sailed from the Downs on 16 May 1817, bound for Bombay. Carmarthen reached Bombay on 28 September. Homeward bound, she was at Malwa on 11 December, Mangalore on 15 December, and Tellicherry on 17 December. She reached St Helena on 17 March 1818, and arrived at Gravesend on 16 June.

By one report Carmarthen was sold in 1818 for use as a hulk. However, she made one more voyage. Carmarthen, Ross, master, sailed for Bombay on 19 May 1819 under a licence from the EIC. She arrived back at Gravesend on 21 August 1820. She was returning from Bombay, Bencoolen, and the Cape.

Year	Master	Owner	Trade	Source
1818	J.Ross	J.Williams	London–India	LR
1819	J.Ross	J.Williams	Plymouth–London; London–India	LR
1820	J.Ross	Williams & Co.	London–Bombay	LR

== Fate ==
Carmarthen was last listed in Lloyd's Register in 1820. Carmarthen was not listed in 1821 and did not appear in Lloyd's List ship arrival and departure data in 1821 either.
