= MacFarquhar =

MacFarquhar (/məkˈfɑːrxər/) is a surname, and may refer to:

- Colin Macfarquhar (1744/5–1793), Scottish bookseller and printer
- Larissa MacFarquhar (born 1968), American writer
- Neil MacFarquhar (born 1960), American journalist
- Roderick MacFarquhar (1930–2019), British journalist and China specialist

== See also ==
- Farquhar
