= David Scott (1801 Bombay ship) =

UK merchant ship 1801–1841

History

United Kingdom
- Name: David Scott
- Namesake: David Scott (of Dunninald)
- Owner: Thomas Garland Murray
- Builder: Jamsetjee Bomanjee Wadia, Bombay Dockyard
- Launched: 2 July 1801
- Fate: Destroyed by fire 12 June 1841

General characteristics
- Tons burthen: 736, or 73661/94, or 737, or 749, or 773, or 77372/94 (bm)
- Length: Overall: 137 ft 3 in (41.8 m); Keel: 110 ft 5 1/4 in (33.7 m)
- Beam: 35 ft 5 in (10.8 m)
- Depth of hold: 20 ft 0 in (6.1 m)
- Armament: 2 guns (1815)
- Notes: Two decks; teak built

David Scott was launched at Bombay in 1801. She was a "country ship", i.e., she generally traded east of the Cape of Good Hope. Between 1802 and 1816 she made five voyages between India and the United Kingdom as an "extra ship" for the British East India Company (EIC). Thereafter she traded between Britain and India under a license from the EIC. A fire destroyed her at Mauritius on 12 June 1841.

== Career ==
1st EIC voyage (1802): Captain Colin Gib sailed David Scott from Bombay to London. she left Bombay on 13 March 1802, reached St Helena on 30 May, and arrived at Long Reach on 28 July. She sailed for India on 27 September.

In 1803 David Scott's owner was Alexander Adamson, and her master Colin Gibb.

David Scott accompanied the EIC's "China Fleet" from Canton in early 1804 and so was present on 14 February at the battle of Pulo Aura, though she did not participate.

2nd EIC voyage (1809): David Scott, Gibbs, master, sailed from Bombay on 16 June 1809. She reached St Helena on 31 August, and on 4 December arrived at Gravesend.

In 1810 Wells repaired and measured David Scott.

3rd EIC voyage (1811–1812): Captain George Williamson sailed from Torbay on 30 May 1811, bound for Bengal. She reached Madeira on 21 June and arrived at Diamond Harbour on 16 November. Homeward bound, David Scott was at Saugor on 24 February 1812 Saugor. She reached St Helena on 10 June and Falmouth on 4 September; she arrived at the Downs on 14 September.

David Scott was admitted to British registry on 12 February 1813. The Registry Act of 1815 ended the practice of ships built in India being sold in the United Kingdom, at least until 1824. Also in 1813, the EIC lost its monopoly on the trade between India and Britain. British ships were then free to sail to India or the Indian Ocean under a license from the EIC.

4th EIC voyage (1813–1814): David Scott, Williamson, master, sailed from Gravesend on 30 April 1813, bound for Madeira and Bombay. She sailed from Portsmouth on 2 June. She reached Madeira on 21 June and arrived at Bombay on 2 November. Homeward bound, she was at Point de Galle on 4 January 1814 and the Cape on 24 February. She reached St Helena on 15 March, was off Portsmouth on 29 April, and arrived at Long Reach on 1 June.

David Scott first appeared in Lloyd's Register (LR) in 1815.

Year	Master	Owner	Trade	Source
1815	Hemmin	Murray	London–India	LR

5th EIC voyage (1815–1816): Captain George Heming sailed from the Downs on 22 May 1815, bound for Madeira and Bombay. David Scott reached Madeiro on 7 June and Mauritius on 28 September; she arrived at Bombay on 7 November. Homeward bound, she was at Tellicherry on 22 February 1816, Cochin on 5 March, and the Cape on 14 May. She reached St Helena on 8 June and arrived at Woolwich on 18 August.

In 1816 David Scott was sold to Gilmore & Co., of London and Calcutta. Thereafter, she traded with India under a license from the EIC.

Year	Master	Owner	Trade	Source
1818	Hemming; W.Hunter	Murray	London–India	LR
1824	W.Hunter; Thornhill	Murray; Gilmore & Co.	London–India	LR
1830	Thornhill; Jackson	Murray; Gilmore & Co.	London–Madras	LR
1834	H. Wise			LR
1835	H. Wise	Gilmore	London–Bengal	LR
1839	H.Wise; Spence	Gilmore	London–Bengal; London–Calcutta	LR
1841	Spence	Gilmore	London–Calcutta	LR

== Fate ==
A fire on 12 June 1841 destroyed David Scott at Mauritius. Her crew survived. She was on a voyage from Calcutta, to London. Her entry in LR carried the annotation "Burnt".
