= Donald Farquharson =

Donald Farquharson may refer to:

- Donald Farquharson (athlete) (born 1925), Welsh athlete, early pioneer of Masters athletics
- Donald Farquharson (judge) (1928–2011), British judge
- Donald Farquharson (politician) (1834–1903), Canadian politician, Premier of Prince Edward Island
