= JW Farquhar =

American singer-songwriter

- Born: 1937/1938
- Origin: Philadelphia, Pennsylvania, United States
- Genres: Acid rock, folk rock, lo-fi
- Occupations: Musician, singer-songwriter
- Instruments: Vocals, guitar, bass, harmonica, drum machine
- Label: Brainbloblu

JW Farquhar is an American musician and singer-songwriter based in Philadelphia. He is known for his 1973 album, The Formal Female. Music critic Ned Raggett called it a "forerunner" to lo-fi and outsider artists including R. Stevie Moore and Jandek.

== Biography ==
Farquhar graduated high school in 1956 at Woodrow Wilson High School in Camden, NJ, and studied electrical engineering for three years at Drexel University, but never finished his degree.

JW Farquhar recorded his debut album, The Formal Female, following the end of his 10-year marriage in 1972. Having little money for gear following the divorce, JW Farquhar recorded the album in response to his ex-wife, using a TEAC 4-track and playing all the instruments, including a primitive drum machine. The recording took place in his apartment in Philadelphia. Due to the presence of various background sounds surrounding his third floor apartment including sirens, buses, and gunshots, Farquhar tried to soundproof his apartment by covering the windows with foam, receiving mixed results. The album was released on Brainblobru Records in 1973 with a private pressing and was reissued in 2008 through Shadoks Records.

Farquhar’s music is categorized as "acid rock" and features "guitar chops complimented [sic] with a smattering of weird effects, harmonica, and rustic distortion." He was compared to Tom Waits and The Formal Female was described as what "Damon Albarn’s Democrazy would be some 30 years later." Farquhar's lyrics primarily focus on his bitterness against his ex-wife. According to PopMatters critic Alan Ranta "they end up being more ludicrous than tormented, which oddly makes JW that much more compelling."

In the late 1980s, Farquhar moved to Fort Mill, South Carolina, where he released his second album, AgentX, in 1997. He now writes books dissecting the Bible mathematically and spiritually.

== Discography ==
Studio albums

- The Formal Female (1973)
- AgentX (1997)
