= John Farquharson =

John Farquharson may refer to:

- John Farquharson, 3rd of Inverey (died 1698), Scottish Jacobite
- John Farquharson (Jesuit) (1699–1782), Scottish Jesuit
- John Farquharson (architect) (1847–1933) Scottish architect
- John Farquharson (journalist) (1929–2016), Australian journalist

== See also ==
- John Farquharson Smith (born 1930), Scottish politician
- John Farquharson McIntosh (1846–1918), Scottish engineer
- Clan Farquharson
