= John Farquhar (footballer) =

Scottish footballer (1924–2000)

Personal information
- Full name: John Farquhar
- Date of birth: 24 June 1924
- Place of birth: New Cumnock, Scotland
- Date of death: 1 November 2000 (aged 76)
- Place of death: Glasgow, Scotland
- Position: Forward

Senior career*
Years	Team	Apps	(Gls)
1943–1948	Queen's Park	38	(13)
1948–1953	Morton	55	(14)
1953–1954	Cowdenbeath	33	(1)
1954–1955	Albion Rovers	15	(3)

International career
1948	Great Britain	1	(0)
- * Club domestic league appearances and goals

John Farquhar (24 June 1924 – 1 November 2000) was a Scottish footballer who played in the Scottish League for Morton, Queen's Park, Cowdenbeath and Albion Rovers as a forward. He was capped by Great Britain.

Farquhar died in Glasgow on 1 November 2000, at the age of 76.
