= William Farquharson =

William Farquharson may refer to:

- William Farquharson (surgeon) (1760–1823), Scottish surgeon
- William Farquharson (cricketer) (1864–1928), Jamaican cricketer
- William Farquharson (politician) (1888–1950), Canadian politician
