= James Augustus Farquhar =

- Born: 12 October 1842; Musquodoboit River, British North America
- Died: 4 June 1930 (aged 87); Halifax, Canada
- Known for: Master Mariner and Businessman
- Spouse: Jesse Anderson

James A. Farquhar (1842–1930) was a master mariner and captain in the late 19th and early 20th century Nova Scotia known for his success in sail, steam, sealing and salvage.

== Early life and family ==
Farquhar was born on October 12, 1842, to James Farquhar and Catherine Farquhar (née Bayers). In August 1849, the Farquhar family moved to Sable island to work the Eastern Station there after the family had lost their saw-mill, grist-mill and small farm due to debt. James attended lessons on the island and he learned to read and write as well as ride horses during his childhood. He also said that his love of ships began with making ship models while he was child surrounded by the numerous shipwrecks on the island. In 1863 Farquhar Sr. decided to move the family back to mainland Nova Scotia and the family settled in Dartmouth

Farquhar married Jessie A. Anderson in Halifax County, Nova Scotia, in 1876. Their first child, a daughter, Bertie sailed in the ship Cumberland with her parents. The couple's second child, also named James Augustus Farquhar, was born on 27 March 1879, in Musquodoboit Harbour, Halifax county. At the time of the registry of their son's birth they were living at 103 Victoria road, Halifax, Nova Scotia. James and Jesse went on to have several other children, Lillian, Ethel, Harry, Beatrice, and Teddy.

== Career ==
Farquhar's first time working on the sea was aboard the ship His Royal Highness Albert Edward Prince of Wales which sailed to Baltimore in 1863. Farquhar then made several voyages on various ships sailing around the world and calling at three continents by 1865. Shortly after he was promoted to the forecastle. When he was 25 years old, Farquhar started diving while working with a salvage crew on the ship Thistle. Farquhar then became the master of Thistle and after a particularly good haul he bought his first vessel a small schooner; James McKeen and started his own salvage company. Farquhar took a break in his salvaging business to captain Horton. In 1875 James took a vacation to his hometown where he met his wife Jesse. After his marriage he decided to become a trader to better support his new family and wrote his masters. He, and others, invested to build a ship called Cumberland. It ran aground on its first day but was saved with little damage. Farquhar took his wife and their first daughter to sail with him aboard Cumberland. Before 1878 Bertie and Jesse moved back to Halifax. Soon after James left Cumberland and went back to salvaging. He became the captain of Alhambra, a steam ship as he was eager to try this new technology. In 1884 he started a steam line for trading and passengers between Nova Scotia and Newfoundland and by 1889 he had another steamer. He soon after started trading with the Chicago Board of Trade under the name J.A. Farquhar & Co. and was quite successful. Farquhar also started dealing in seals, and their products, namely pelts using his ship Newfoundland. On July 9, 1898 Newfoundland was arrested by the Americans for allegedly running the Cuban blockade but was later cleared of the charges. Farquhar purchased a former British minesweeper named Stella Maris which he used for salvage and tug boat work. The tug played a heroic but tragic role in the Halifax Explosion in 1917. Stella Maris was badly damaged and the crew suffered heavy losses but the Farquhar family were ashore at the time and not hurt. From winter 1906 to spring 1907 Farquhar took a vacation in Europe, and he grew especially found of Monte Carlo; where he would return to many times before his death. In the same year he bought a yacht, Christine. Farquhar and his wife Jesse would sail around the world together for years to come. The couple loved traveling together, especially in the winter months, by plane, boat, and car.

== Death ==
Farquhar died at the age of 87 on June 4, 1930 in Halifax. His cause of death is listed as arterial sclerosis.
