= James Farquharson =

James Farquharson FRS (1781–1843) was a Scottish minister, meteorologist, scientific writer, and Fellow of the Royal Society.

== Life ==
Farquharson was the son of John Farquharson, excise officer at Coull, Aberdeenshire, and was born in that parish in 1781. After attending the parish school at Coull he went to King's College, Aberdeen, where he graduated M.A. in 1798, and in the same year was appointed schoolmaster of Alford, Aberdeenshire. He then soon began courses as a student of theology, and received license as a preacher. On 17 September 1812 he was ordained as a minister of the Church of Scotland in Alford.

On 28 January 1830 he was elected a Fellow of the Royal Society of London, and King's College, Aberdeen conferred on him the honorary doctorate of LL.D. on 25 February 1837. The following year he became an honorary member of the Société Française de Statistique Universelle. Among his correspondents were Davies Gilbert, Sir Edward Sabine, Sir William Hooker, and Sir David Brewster.

Farquharson died in Alford on 3 December 1843. His position as minister of Alford was filled by Rev Dr James Gillan.

== Works ==
Farquharson communicated papers to the Philosophical Transactions of the Royal Society. Of these some are on the aurora borealis, which he studied closely for many years. In 1823 he published in the Edinburgh Philosophical Journal a more accurate description of the aurora than had previously appeared; and in the Philosophical Transactions for 1829 he published new observations showing that the aurora's arches and streamers are aligned to the field lines of the Earth's magnetic field.

From his own observations Farquharson inferred that the aurora was lower than had been generally supposed, at altitudes not extending far beyond the region of the clouds; and in a paper in the Philosophical Transactions for 1830 he showed that it was produced by the development of electricity by the condensation of water vapour. In the volume for 1839 he gave a geometrical measurement of an aurora, one of the first attempted, which made its height less than 1 mile (1.6 km), and showed its dependency upon the altitude of the clouds. In the volume for 1842 he described an aurora which was situated between himself and stratus clouds.

in the Philosophical Transactions for 1836, Farquharson wrote a paper on the formation of ice at the bottom of running water, a phenomenon already discussed by François Arago and others. On the Nature and Localities of Hoar Frost, in the Transactions of the Highland and Agricultural Society of Scotland for 1840, was related to investigations of currents of colder and warmer air moving over the face of a flat country surrounded by hills, and their effects on vegetation.

Farquharson in 1831 published an essay On the Form of the Ark of Noah. This was followed by a treatise on the Old Testament creatures Leviathan and Behemoth. In 1838 he published A New Illustration of the Latter Part of Daniel's Last Vision and Prophecy. He communicated registers of temperature which he kept for a long period of years to the Royal Society, and furnished the account of the parish of Alford for the New Statistical Account of Scotland.

== Family ==
By his marriage, on 19 October 1826, to Helen Tatlor (d.1873), eldest daughter of Alexander Taylor, Farquharson had a family of eight children of whom five sons and a daughter lived to adulthood:

- Anne Robison Farquharson (b.1827) married Rev Thomas Fraser of Croy
- Helen (b.1830) died in infancy
- Rev Dr James Farquharson (b.1832) minister of Selkirk
- Alexander (b.1834)
- John Ogilvie (b.1836)
- Nathaniel Farquharson (b.1837) trained as an advocate in Aberdeen
- Andrew (b.1839) died in infancy
- Andrew (b.1841)
