= David Smith =

David Smith may refer to:

== Academics ==
- David Paige Smith (1830–1880), American medical doctor and professor at Yale
- David Eugene Smith (1860–1944), American professor of mathematics
- David E. Smith (physician), American physician and academic
- David E. Smith (political scientist), Canadian scholar of political science
- D. M. Smith (1884–1962), American professor of mathematics at Georgia Tech
- David Smith (amateur mathematician), discoverer of an aperiodic tiling
- D. Nichol Smith (1875–1962), Scottish professor of literature at Oxford University
- David Chadwick Smith (1931–2000), Canadian professor of economics, Queen's University
- David Smith (chemical physicist) (1935–2023), British chemical physicist, University of Birmingham
- David C. Smith (historian) (1929–2009), American professor of history, University of Maine
- David Martyn Smith (1921–2009), American professor of forestry at Yale
- David Smith (botanist) (1930–2018), British professor of botany
- Dai Smith (historian) (born 1945), Welsh professor of history
- David J. Smith (physicist) (born 1948), Australian professor of physics at Arizona State
- David Livingstone Smith (born 1953), professor of philosophy at the University of New England
- David Smith (historian) (born 1963), British professor of history at Cambridge
- David K. Smith, British professor of chemistry at University of York
- David R. Smith (physicist), American physicist and professor of electrical and computer engineering at Duke University

== Arts and entertainment ==
- David Smith (embroiderer) (died 1597), artisan at the court of Elizabeth I
- David Forbes Smith (1865–1923), Scottish architect
- David Smith (director) (1872–1930), English film director of the silent era
- David Stanley Smith (composer) (1877–1949), American classical composer, professor of music at Yale
- David Smith (sculptor) (1906–1965), American Abstract Expressionist
- David C. Smith (author) (born 1952), American novelist of heroic fantasy
- David Smith, Australian artist, founding member of the art collective Optronic Kinetics in 1970s Sydney
- David G. Smith, American singer-songwriter from the 1970s to the present
- David Bruce Smith (born 1958), American publisher, real estate executive
- David Alan Smith (actor) (born 1959), American actor and writer
- David Lee Smith (born 1963), American film actor
- David A. Smith (designer) (born 1968), British designer, glass embosser, sign writer
- David B. Smith (born 1977), American multi-disciplinary artist
- David Brian Smith (born 1981), English artist
- David Branson Smith (born 1984), American film screenwriter

== Computing ==
- David Canfield Smith (born 1945), American computer scientist who invented graphical interface icons
- David A. Smith (computer scientist) (born 1957), American computer scientist and entrepreneur
- David L. Smith (hacker) (born c. 1968), author of the Melissa virus

== Medicine ==
- David Boyes Smith (1833–1889), deputy surgeon general of the Indian Medical Service
- David E. Smith (physician), American physician and academic
- David M. Smith (virologist) (born 1971), American translational research virologist
- David Weyhe Smith (1926–1981), American pediatrician and dysmorphologist

== Journalism ==
- David D. Smith (born 1950), American president and CEO of Sinclair Broadcast Group
- David Andrew Smith (born 1952), British journalist
- David Henry Smith (born 1954), economics editor of the UK Sunday Times
- David Smith (journalist) (born 1975), Washington, DC, Bureau Chief of the UK The Guardian

== Politics and law ==
=== Australia ===
- David Smith (Victorian politician) (1861–1943), Australian politician
- David Smith (public servant) (1933–2022), Official Secretary to five Governors-General of Australia
- David Smith (Australian Capital Territory politician) (born 1970), Australian politician
- David Smith (Western Australian politician) (1943–2026), Australian politician

=== Canada ===
==== Federal parliamentarians ====
- David Smith (Canadian senator) (1941–2020), Toronto alderman (1972-78), Liberal MP (1980–84), cabinet minister (1983–84), senator (2002–16) who chaired the Ontario Liberal campaign during the 1993 / 1997 / 2000 federal elections, and chair of law firm Fraser Milner Casgrain
- David Smith (Quebec politician) (born 1963), Liberal MP for Pontiac (2004–06)

==== Ontario provincial legislators ====
- John David Smith (Ontario politician), briefly the Liberal MPP for Victoria North (1875)
- David William Smith (born 1938), Liberal MPP for Lambton (1985–90)
- Dave Smith (Peterborough, Ontario politician) (born 1970), Progressive Conservative MPP for Peterborough—Kawartha (since 2018)
- David Smith (Scarborough MPP), Progressive Conservative MPP for Scarborough Centre (since 2022)

==== Pre-confederation ====
- Sir David William Smith, 1st Baronet (1764–1837), soldier and politician who served as a member (1792–1804) and the speaker (1796–1800, 1801–04) of the Parliament of Upper Canada

==== Judges ====
- David Duncan Smith (born 1944), Chief Justice of the Court of Queen's Bench of New Brunswick (1998–2019) who presided over the prosecution relating to the 2014 Moncton shooting

=== United Kingdom ===
- David Smith (British Conservative politician) (1826–1886), British MP
- David Smith (British Labour politician), British MP for North Northumberland elected in 2024
- David Smith (spy), Berlin British Embassy security guard convicted for spying for Russia
- David Smith (Scottish politician), Member of the Scottish parliament

=== United States ===
- David L. Smith (politician) (1827–1902), American politician from Pennsylvania
- David Highbaugh Smith (1854–1928), American congressman
- David S. Smith (1918–2012), U.S. ambassador to Sweden
- D. Brooks Smith (born 1951), American federal judge
- Adam Smith (Washington politician) (David Adam Smith, born 1965), American congressman
- David Brock Smith, member of the Oregon House of Representatives
- David Smith (Florida politician) (born 1960), member of the Florida Legislature
- David Smith (Oklahoma politician), member of the Oklahoma House of Representatives
- David Burnell Smith (1941–2014), member of the Arizona House of Representatives
- David Tyson Smith, member of the Missouri House of Representatives

=== Other countries ===
- David Smith (judge) (1888–1982), New Zealand judge
- David Smith (Rhodesian politician) (1922–1996), politician in Rhodesia and Zimbabwe

== Religion ==
- David Hyrum Smith (1844–1904), missionary of the Latter Day Saint movement
- David A. Smith (Mormon) (1879–1952), bishop and first president of the Mormon Tabernacle Choir
- David Smith (bishop) (1935–2024), English Bishop of Bradford

== Sports ==
=== Cricket ===
- David Smith (Gloucestershire cricketer) (1934–2003), English cricketer, 1956–1971
- David Smith (Derbyshire cricketer) (1940–2021), English cricketer
- David Smith (cricketer, born 1945), English cricketer
- David Smith (cricketer, born 1956), English cricketer
- David Smith (Tasmania cricketer) (born 1957), Australian cricketer for the Tasmanian Tigers
- David Smith (Sussex cricketer, born 1962), English cricketer
- David Smith (Warwickshire cricketer, born 1956), English cricketer
- David Smith (Warwickshire cricketer, born 1962), English cricketer
- David Smith (cricketer, born 1970), English cricketer
- David Smith (cricketer, born 1989), English cricketer

=== Footballers ===
- David Smith (sportsman) (1884–1963), Australian rules footballer and cricketer, 1903–1914
- David Smith (footballer, born 1871), English professional footballer who played between 1890 and 1896
- David Smith (footballer, born 1875) (1875–1947), Scottish footballer
- David Smith (footballer, born 1968), English professional footballer who played between 1986 and 2003
- David Smith (footballer, born 1970), English professional footballer who played between 1989 and 2004
- David Smith (footballer, born 1993), Scottish professional footballer
- Dai Smith (rugby league) (David Smith), rugby league footballer who played in the 1900s for Salford
- David Smith (rugby league, born 1953), rugby league footballer who played in the 1970s and 1980s
- David Smith (rugby league, born 1967), Australian rugby league footballer who played in the 1980s and 1990s
- David Smith (rugby league, born 1968), English rugby league footballer who played in the 1980s and 1990s
- David Smith (rugby union, born 1986), Samoan rugby union footballer for Hurricanes, Blues, Auckland
- David Smith (rugby union, born 1988), English rugby union footballer
- David Smith (rugby union, born 1957), South African rugby union footballer

=== Track and field ===
- Dave Smith (triple jumper) (born 1947), American triple jumper
- David Smith (hammer thrower, born 1962), English Olympic hammer thrower
- David Smith (hammer thrower, born 1974), English Olympic hammer thrower
- David Adley Smith II (born 1992), Puerto Rican high jumper
- David Smith (born 1991), British high jumper and competitor at the 2018 Commonwealth Games

=== Other sports ===
- David Smith (sport shooter) (1880–1945), South African Olympic sport shooter
- David Smith (sailor) (1925–2014), American sailor and Olympic Champion
- Davey Boy Smith (1962–2002), British professional wrestler a.k.a. "The British Bulldog"
- David Miln Smith (born 1938), American adventure athlete and speaker
- David Smith (baseball historian) (born 1948), American baseball historian, statistician, professor of biology
- David Smith (racewalker) (born 1955), Australian Olympic race walker
- David Ross Smith (born 1925), ice hockey defenceman
- Dave Smith (ice hockey) (born 1968), Canadian coach, former player, IHL
- David Smith (rower) (born 1978), British adaptive rower
- Davey Boy Smith Jr. (born 1985), Canadian professional wrestler, a.k.a. Harry Francis Smith
- David Smith (volleyball) (born 1985), American volleyball player
- David Smith (canoeist) (born 1987), Australian sprint canoeist
- David Smith (boccia) (born 1989), British Paralympic boccia player
- David Smith (curler), Scottish curler, first international competition was 1982
- David Smith (fighter), American mixed martial arts fighter
- David Smith (racing driver) (born 1950), Canadian stock car racing driver

== Other people ==
- David John Smith (1907–1976), president of British retailer W. H. Smith, 1948–1968
- David M. Smith (Medal of Honor) (1926–1950), American soldier and Medal of Honor recipient
- David Smith (executive), Welsh banking and sporting administrator
- David Smith (murderer) (born 1956), English rapist and murderer
- David R. Smith (general) (born 1942), US Air Force general
- David J. Smith (author) (born 1944), Canadian teacher and educational consultant, children's writer

== See also ==
- Dave Smith (disambiguation)
- David Smyth (disambiguation)
