= M. Ann McCaig =

Chancellor of the University of Calgary
- In office 1994–1998
- Preceded by: David B. Smith
- Succeeded by: Jack Perraton

Personal details
- Born: June 1939 (age 87) Tisdale, Saskatchewan
- Spouse(s): Roger Woodrow McCaig (m. 1962; died 1976) John Robert McCaig (m. 1984; died 2005)
- Education: University of Saskatchewan, (B.Ed, 1961)
- Occupation: educator, volunteer

Margaret Ann McCaig (née Schnell; born June 1939) was the chancellor of the University of Calgary in Alberta from 1994 until 1998. She was named to the Alberta Order of Excellence in 2004.
