= WEBG =

WEBG may refer to:

- WEBG (FM), a radio station (95.9 FM) licensed to serve Mina, New York, United States
- WCHI-FM, a radio station (95.5 FM) licensed to serve Chicago, Illinois, United States, which held the call sign WEBG from 2015 to 2020
- WRUM, a radio station (100.3 FM) licensed to serve Orlando, Florida, United States, which held the call sign WEBG from 2004 to 2005
- WYUP, a radio station (1400 AM) licensed to serve Loretto, Pennsylvania, United States, which held the call sign WEBG from 1996 to 2001
- WRDD, a radio station (1580 AM) formerly licensed to serve Ebensburg, Pennsylvania, which held the call sign WEBG from 1985 to 1990
