= David Smyth =

David Smyth(e) may refer to:

- David Smyth (footballer) (1914–?), Scottish footballer
- Dave Smyth, American soccer defender
- David Smyth (rugby union), rugby coach
- David J. Smyth (1872–1954), member of the Pennsylvania House of Representatives
- David A. Smyth (born 1954), British scholar in the field of Thai studies
- David Smythe, Lord Methven (1746–1806), Scottish lawyer and judge
- David Smythe (cricketer), English cricketer
- David K. Smythe, geophysicist and former member of The Rezillos

== See also ==
- David Smith (disambiguation)
