= Shady Hill School =

Coordinates: 42.371°N 71.138°W

- Cambridge, Massachusetts; United States

Information
- Type: Private
- Established: 1915
- Director: Mark Stanek
- Faculty: 90
- Enrollment: 500+
- Student to teacher ratio: 8:1
- Campus: Suburban, 11 acres (45,000 m^{2})
- Colors: Green and blue
- Athletics: 11 sports 23 teams
- Athletics conference: New England Preparatory School Athletic Council (NEPSAC)
- Mascot: Stinger (bee)
- Website: shs.org

Shady Hill School, or SHS, is an independent, co-educational day school in Cambridge, Massachusetts. Founded in 1915, Shady Hill serves students in pre-kindergarten (called 'Beginners' by the school) through 8th grade. The school has an enrollment of approximately 500 students.

Mark Stanek became the school's sixth director in 2010; he was a math teacher and a former Head of School at Ethical Culture Fieldston School in New York. Former director Bruce Shaw stepped down in June 2010.

== History ==
Shady Hill was founded in 1915 by a group of Cambridge families, including John Hubbard Sturgis Jr., Agnes Boyle O'Reilly, and her husband William Ernest Hocking. The school was first held on the "back porch" of the Hockings' house on Quincy Street in Cambridge. The school enrollment quickly outgrew the Hocking home, and the Cooperative Open Air School (as it was originally known) moved to the Charles Eliot Norton estate at the corner of Scott and Holden Streets in Cambridge. The school took its current name from this location, Shady Hill Square, before moving to the school's current location on Coolidge Hill, also in Cambridge.

== Campus ==
The Shady Hill School campus features eleven acres of paths, wetlands, and grassy areas for play and team sports. The campus includes nineteen buildings: an art, woodshop, and music center; library; gymnasium; science laboratories; a STEM (science, technology, engineering, and mathematics) building known as the "Hub" which includes a makerspace; an assembly hall; and a number of child-scaled classroom buildings. The Hub is connected to the gym. The school borders the Buckingham Browne & Nichols School (BB&N) athletic campus, with their turf fields touching. Shady Hill also borders Cambridge Cemetery and is across the street from Mount Auburn Cemetery along Coolidge Avenue.

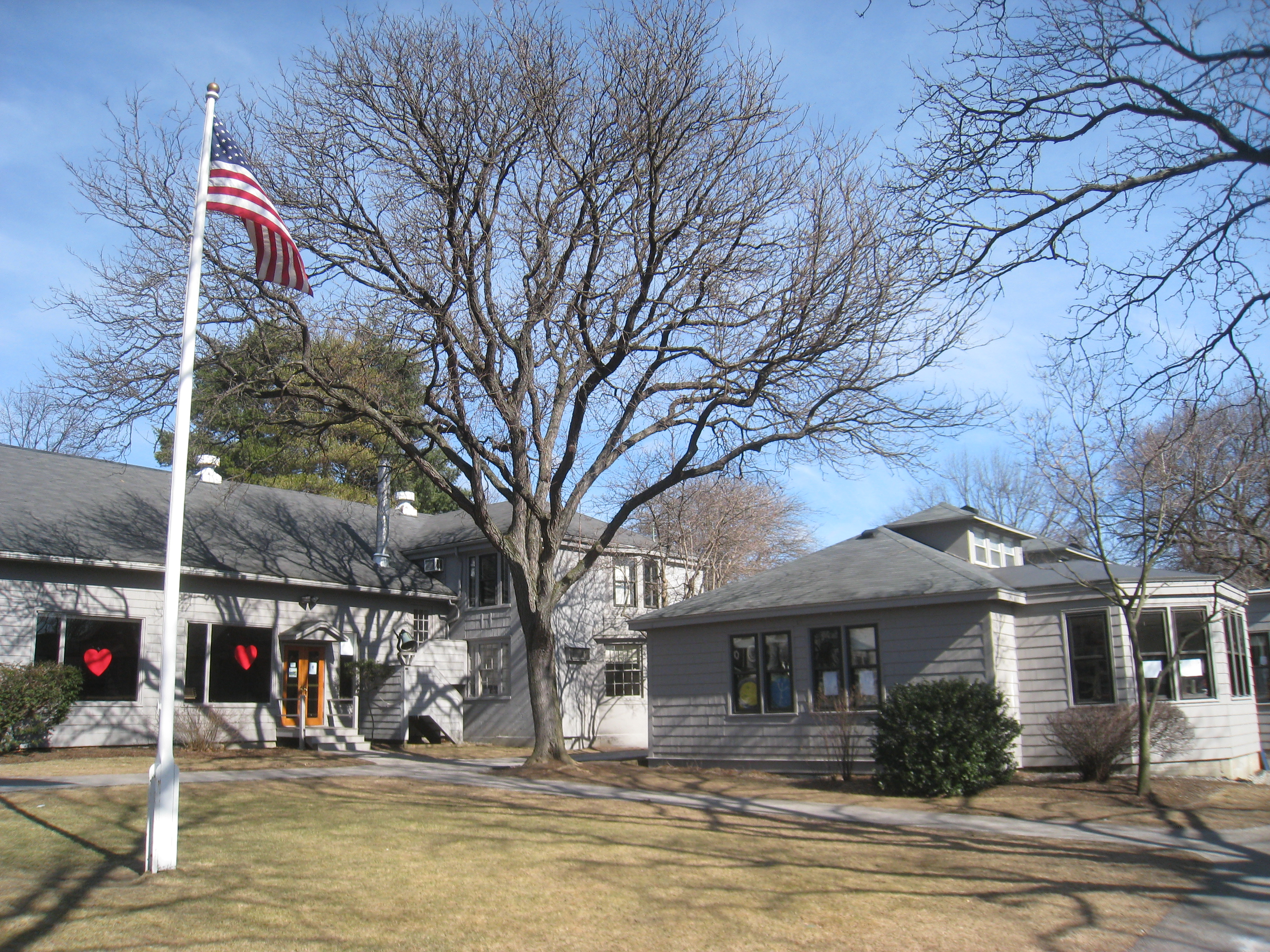

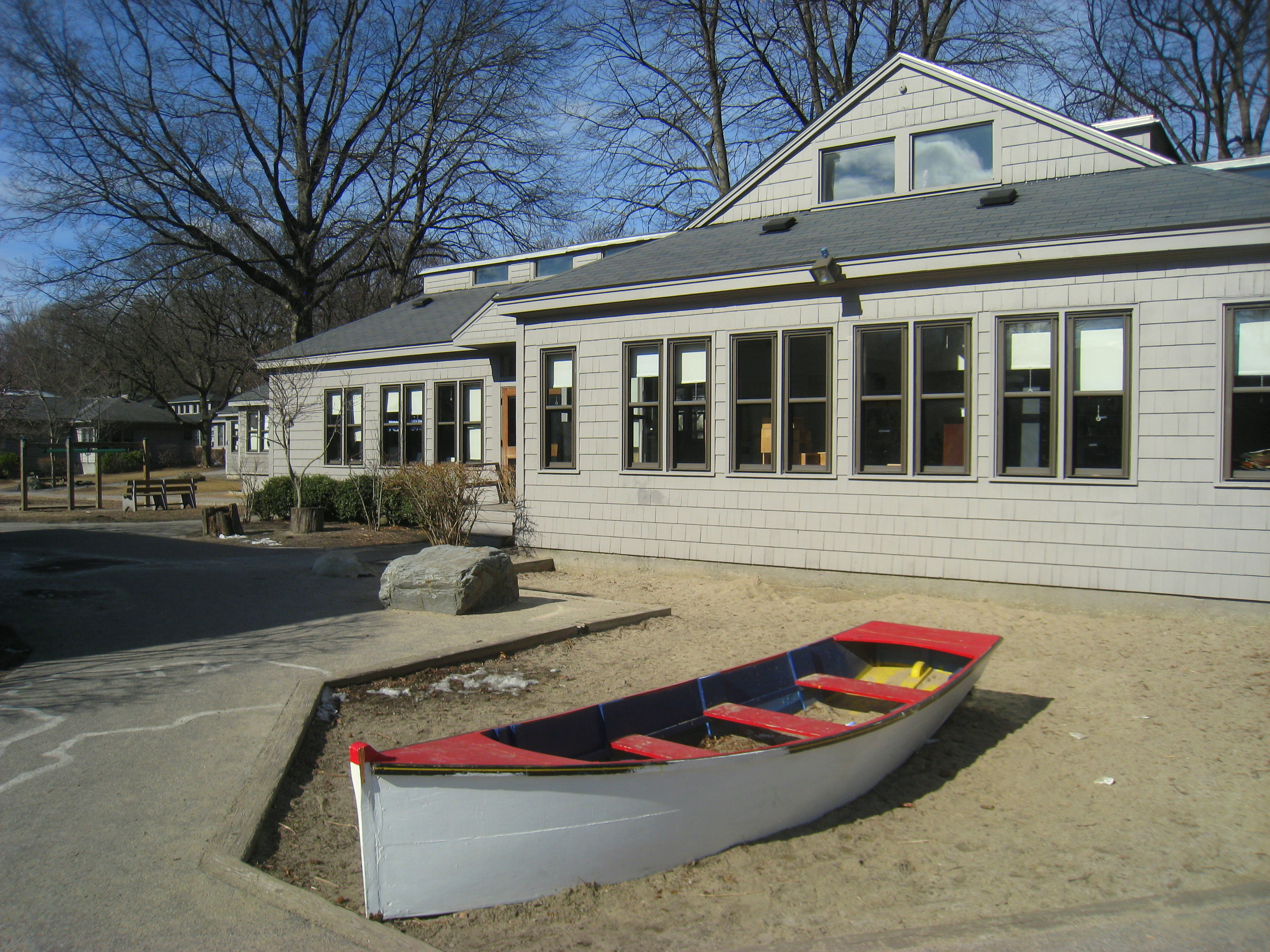

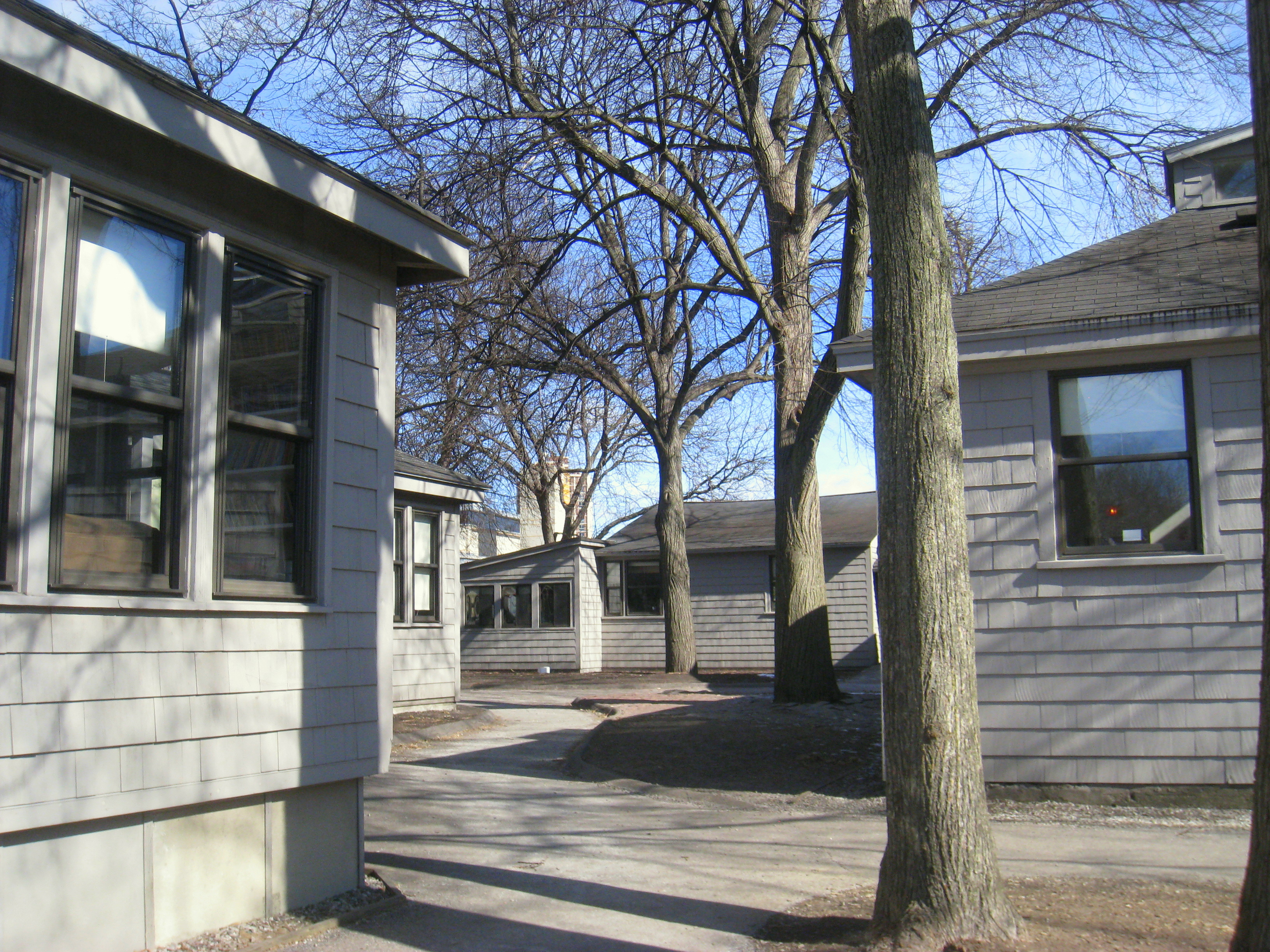

== Athletics ==
Shady Hill's athletic program includes "movement education" for Beginners through second grade and physical education for third grade through fifth, as well as a broad variety of intramural and interscholastic team sports for students in grades 6-8. A gymnasium that housed three full-sized basketball courts opened in February 2009; in 2016 Shady Hill took out one of the basketball courts and replaced it with the Hub.

== Teacher Training Center (TTC) ==
Shady Hill offers a one-year teacher preparation and graduation program in which 16 to 18 apprentice teachers are mentored by certified master teachers in classrooms at the school. Apprentices have the opportunity through the Teacher Training Center (TTC) to spend the spring semester in local public schools. Many apprentices also participate in a master's program at either Lesley University or Tufts University.

== Notable alumni ==
- Jonathan Aldrich Poet.
- Kitty Brazelton Vocalist, composer, flutist, lead singer and bandleader.
- Jonatha Brooke Folk rock singer-songwriter and guitarist
- Loren Bouchard Creator of television show Bob's Burgers.
- Ed Droste Frontman of rock band Grizzly Bear.
- Squirrel Flower Indie folk musician.
- China Forbes Lead singer of the band Pink Martini.
- Maya Forbes Screenwriter and television producer.
- Motoko Fujishiro Huthwaite Teacher, awarded the Congressional Gold Medal.
- Sebastian Junger Journalist, author and filmmaker
- Hester Kaplan Short story writer and novelist.
- Richard Read Two-time Pulitzer Prize winner
- David J. Smith Teacher, children's writer and educational consultant.
- Elijah Wald Folk blues guitarist and music historian.
- Marina von Neumann Whitman Economist, writer and former automobile executive.
