= Dave Smith =

Dave Smith may refer to:

== Arts and entertainment ==
- Dave Smith (archivist) (1940–2019), American writer, founder of Walt Disney Company archives
- Dave Smith (poet) (born 1942), American poet
- Dave Smith (composer) (born 1949), British experimental composer
- Dave Smith (engineer) (1950–2022), proposer of the MIDI standard, synthesizer designer
- Dave Smith (Coronation Street), a character from British soap opera on ITV

== Sports ==
=== American football ===
- Dave Smith (American football coach) (1933–2009), former Texas A&M quarterback and SMU coach
- Dave Smith (fullback) (born 1937), former American collegiate and Houston Oilers football player
- Dave Smith (running back) (born 1947), former Green Bay Packers football player
- Dave Smith (wide receiver) (1947–2020), former Pittsburgh Steelers football player
- Dave Smith (offensive lineman) (born 1964), American football player

=== Association football ===
- Dave Smith (footballer, born 1903) (1903–?), Scottish football goalkeeper
- Dave Smith (footballer, born 1915) (1915–1998), English football inside-forward, played for Northampton Town
- Dave Smith (footballer, born 1933) (1933–2022), Scottish football fullback for clubs including Burnley, managed several clubs in the 1970s/1980s
- Dave Smith (footballer, born 1936) (1936–2015), English former professional footballer
- Dave Smith (footballer, born 1943), Scotland international football midfielder, played in Scotland (for Aberdeen, Rangers, Berwick, etc.) and in the US, managed Berwick
- Dave Smith (footballer, born 1947) (1947–2022), English football midfielder, played for Lincoln, Rotherham
- Dave Smith (footballer, born 1950), English football striker, played for clubs including Huddersfield, Cambridge, Hartlepool
- Dave Smith (footballer, born 1961), English football winger, played for Gillingham, Bristol City, etc.

=== Baseball ===
- Dave Smith (pitcher, born 1914) (1914–1998), Major League Baseball relief pitcher
- Dave Smith (pitcher, born 1955) (1955–2008), Major League Baseball relief pitcher
- Dave Smith (pitcher, born 1957) (born 1957), Major League Baseball relief pitcher

=== Other sports ===
- Dave Smith (boxer) (1886–1945), New Zealand-born heavyweight boxer
- Dave Smith (triple jumper) (born 1947), American track and field athlete
- Dave Smith (racewalker) (born 1955), Australian Olympic racewalker
- Dave Smith (hammer thrower, born 1962), English Olympic hammer thrower
- Dave Smith (hammer thrower, born 1974), English Olympic hammer thrower
- Davey Boy Smith (1962–2002), British wrestler also known as "The British Bulldog"
- Dave Smith (ice hockey) (born 1968), Canadian hockey head coach, Canisius College
- Dave Smith (darts player) (born 1971), English darts player
- David Smith (canoeist) (born 1987), Australian Olympic gold medal-winning canoeist

== Others ==
- Dave Smith (comedian) (born 1983), comedian, podcaster, prominent activist and speaker
- Dave Smith (priest) (born 1962), Australian Anglican parish priest
- Dave Smith (Peterborough, Ontario politician) (born 1970), Canadian politician

== See also ==
- David Smith (disambiguation)
- Dave Smith Motors, auto dealership group based in Kellogg, Idaho
