= Victor Dane =

British naturopath and occultist

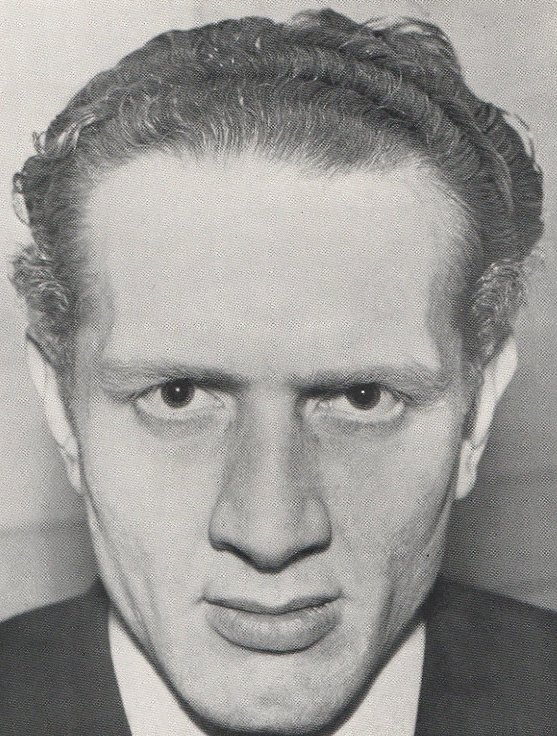
- Born: 1897
- Occupations: Naturopath, writer

Victor Dane (born 1897) was a British naturopath, occultist, physical culturist and yoga writer.

== Biography ==
Dane claimed to be a master of the "systems of Hatha and Raja Yoga" and advertised himself as "the only white yogi" in national newspapers such as the Daily Mirror and the Sunday Graphic. He claimed to have studied under yoga Masters in India where he received the 'Guru Mantra' or "ear-whispered secret". His book Naked Ascetic (1933) is an example of the fakir-yogi genre filled with mysterious stories of bullet proof yogis, mesmeric powers and poison drinking. The stories were questioned by reviewers at the time, for example a reviewer in The Spectator stated it is "obvious from his book that he has only a cursory acquaintance with the languages and customs of the Indian people, and that he did not succeed in meeting many of the serious exponents of Yoga". A review in the Vedanta Kesari magazine praised Dane's narrative skill but doubted how much of the book was fact. Yoga scholar Mark Singleton has noted that Dane's "vision of yoga, while firmly rooted in Asian inspired esoteric, was also deeply influenced by modern physical culture, and his yoga writings exhibit a marked concern for the hygienic perfection of the body".

Dane was a physical culturist and was the editor of the magazine Modern Psychology and The Sporting Arena. In 1930, he was a physical culture consultant to Arsenal F.C. He was considered an expert on the occult and was invited by Barbara Cartland to give a speech on black magic at Admiralty House. Dane worked as a naturopath in New Barnet. He was not a qualified doctor and never described himself as a doctor. In March 1931, a patient of his Mrs. P. G. Pickett age 35 died during a day in his absence. Dane had diagnosed Pickett with anaemia for which he treated her. A post-mortem examination found that the cause of death was advanced tuberculosis of the lungs. A jury returned a verdict of death from natural causes and gave their opinion that medical aid should have been called several days before Mrs. Pickett died and that Dane had shown gross carelessness by leaving the patient for a whole day without help.

In 1934, Dane authored the book Modern Fitness which contained an introduction by Herbert Chapman. His book The Gateway to Prosperity was re-published in 1937 with Charles F. Haanel's book The Amazing Secrets of the Yogi.

== Activism ==
=== Sunbathing ===
Dane was an advocate of light therapy and sunbathing to cure disease. He authored The Sunlight Cure which argued that sun tanning was the manifestation of solar energy (ultraviolet radiation) stored in the body. Dane's book contains a photograph of George Bernard Shaw sunbathing.

=== Vegetarianism ===
Dane advocated for a vegetarian diet. In 1930, he lectured for the Bromley and District Vegetarian Society.

== Selected publications ==
- The Sunlight Cure: How to Use the Ultra-Violet Rays (1929)
- Grow Old and Stay Young (with an introduction by Edgar J. Saxon, 1930)
- Naked Ascetic (1933)
- The Gateway to Prosperity (with a foreword by Major Reginald F. E. Austin, 1933)
- Modern Fitness; Or, the Five-Minute Plan (with an introduction by Herbert Chapman, 1934)
- Relaxation: A Practical Handbook for Laymen and Psychologists (1940)
- How to Hypnotize Yourself and Others (1946)
