= WRDD =

Simulcast with WCAT-FM, Carlisle
- Shippensburg, Pennsylvania; United States
- Frequency: 1480 kHz
- Branding: Red 102.3

Programming
- Format: Country music
- Affiliations: Westwood One

Ownership
- Owner: Shippensburg Broadcasting, Inc
- Sister stations: WCAT-FM; WHYL; WIOO

History
- First air date: December 5, 1961
- Former call signs: WSHP (1961–2000); WEEO (2000–2021)
- Call sign meaning: "Red"

Technical information
- Licensing authority: FCC
- Facility ID: 67452
- Class: D
- Power: 410 watts day; 9 watts night
- Transmitter coordinates: 40°4′30.3″N 77°32′8″W
- Translator: 100.3 W262DL (Shippensburg)

Links
- Public license information: Public file; LMS
- Webcast: Listen live
- Website: red1023.com

WRDD (1480 AM) is a commercial radio station licensed to serve Shippensburg, Pennsylvania. The station simulcasts a country music format with a sister station in Carlisle, WCAT-FM, called "Red 102.3". It is owned by Shippenburg Broadcasting.

By day, WRDD transmits with 410 watts, but to avoid interference at night with other stations on 1480 AM, WRDD reduces power to 9 watts at sunset. Programming is heard around the clock on FM translator W262DL at 100.3 MHz.

== History ==
=== WSHP ===
Arthur Greiner founded the station, originally known as WSHP, in 1961. The name of the original licensee was Town Radio, Inc. Greiner served as the company's president and the station's general manager. Greiner operated the radio station until his death.

WSHP originally was a daytimer station with a power output of 500 watts. It remained a daytime-only station until it received nighttime power authorization in the late 1980s that allowed it to operate after sunset.

=== Sale to Allegheny Mountain Network ===
Cary Simpson's Allegheny Mountain Network group of station purchased the station in October 1996. On April 28, 2000, the station changed its callsign to WEEO.

In 2008, due to major mechanical failure of the internal radiator element of the Valcom fiberglass antenna in use, the station constructed a 150-foot (46 m) folded unipole designed by R. Morgan Burrow Jr. P.E. which yields a higher operating efficiency than the Valcom.

=== WRDD ===
On September 29, 2021, WEEO changed its format from a simulcast of classic country-formatted WIOO to a simulcast of country-formatted WCAT-FM under new WRDD call letters.

== Translator ==
WRDD programming is broadcast on the following translator:

Broadcast translator for WRDD
Call sign	Frequency	City of license	FID	ERP (W)	HAAT	Class	Transmitter coordinates	FCC info
W262DL	100.3 FM	Shippensburg, Pennsylvania	200357	250	402 m (1,319 ft)	D	39°57′40.3″N 77°28′31.0″W	LMS
