= Bud McCaig =

John Robert McCaig
- Born: 14 June 1929; Moose Jaw, Saskatchewan
- Died: 11 November 2005 (aged 76); Barbados
- Occupation(s): President, Trimac Limited

John Robert "Bud" McCaig (14 June 1929 – 11 January 2005) was a Canadian businessman and a co-owner of the Calgary Flames NHL franchise.

== Biography ==
McCaig was born in Moose Jaw, Saskatchewan on 14 June 1929 to John Waters McCaig (1905–1981) and Stella May Cook (1909–1997). His father was originally from Thornhill, Dumfriesshire, while his mother was from Villa Grove, Illinois. John and Stella had three other children, Jeanne Bernice (1931–1961), Roger Woodrow (1933–1976), and Maurice Wayne (1938–2024). Bud attended Moose Jaw Technical High School but dropped out in 1946 to join his father in the transportation business.

In 1961, the company moved to Calgary and bought a competing company named H.M. Trimble & Sons, thus expanding their business into the rest of Alberta, and into British Columbia and Alaska. The merged company is known as Trimac for "Tri"mble and "Mac"cam as well for John and his three "Mac" brothers. McCaig served as its CEO until his retirement in 1994, and later became chairman of the board.

In August 1994, McCaig purchased a 6.11 per cent stake in the Calgary Flames for $4.6 million.

On 11 March 1950, McCaig married Anne Shorrocks Glass (1928–2015). They had three children: Jeffrey, Joann, and Melanie. The McCaigs divorced in the early 1980s. In 1984 McCaig remarried to M. Ann McCaig (née Schnell), originally of Tisdale, Saskatchewan. Ann was the widow of Bud's younger brother, Roger, who had died of cancer.

McCaig died in Barbados and was buried in Queen's Park Cemetery in Calgary.
