= WCAT-FM =

- Carlisle, Pennsylvania; United States
- Broadcast area: Harrisburg metropolitan area
- Frequency: 102.3 MHz
- Branding: Red 102.3

Programming
- Format: Country music
- Affiliations: Performance Racing Network; Westwood One

Ownership
- Owner: Harold Z. Swidler; (Radio Carlisle, Inc.)
- Sister stations: WRDD; WHYL; WIOO

History
- First air date: 1959 (as WHYL-FM)
- Former call signs: WHYL-FM (1959–1979); WZUE (1979–1981); WHYL-FM (1981–2002); WRKZ-FM (2002–2004)
- Call sign meaning: "Cat" (previous branding of 106.7 FM)

Technical information
- Licensing authority: FCC
- Facility ID: 74557
- Class: A
- ERP: 3,000 watts horizontal polarization; 2,750 watts vertical polarization
- HAAT: 100 meters (330 ft)
- Transmitter coordinates: 40.289806°N 77.135806°W
- Repeater: 1480 WRDD (Shippensburg)

Links
- Public license information: Public file; LMS
- Webcast: Listen live (via TuneIn)
- Website: www.red1023.com

WCAT-FM (102.3 MHz "Red 102.3") is a commercial radio station licensed to Carlisle, Pennsylvania, and serving the Harrisburg metropolitan area. It is owned by Harold Z. Swidler, with the license held by Radio Carlisle, Inc. WCAT-FM broadcasts a country music format, mixing current and recent hits with classic country. Programming is simulcast on co-owned WRDD (1480 AM) in Shippensburg, Pennsylvania. The radio studios and offices are on North Hanover Street in Carlisle.

WCAT-FM has an effective radiated power (ERP) of 3,000 watts horizontal polarization and 2,750 watts vertical polarization. The transmitter is on Spring Road (Route 74) in Middlesex Township, Pennsylvania.

== History ==
In 1959, WHYL-FM first signed on the air. It was a simulcast of co-owned WHYL (960 AM). The two stations were owned by Mid-Atlantic Broadcasting. WHYL had a middle of the road format of popular adult music, news and sports. By the 1970s, WHYL-FM began playing country music using broadcast automation.

On December 31, 1979, the call sign changed to WZUE and was branded as "Zoo 102". The WZUE calls were short-lived as the call sign reverted to WHYL-FM on October 14, 1981, branded as "Country 102". On April 26, 2002, the call sign was changed to WRKZ-FM. It began as a simulcast of WCAT-FM 106.7, and branded itself as "Cat Country 106.7". After a brief period, WRKZ-FM flipped formats to all-1980s rock hits and re-branded itself as "Z102.3".

Another format change came shortly thereafter when "Cat Country 106.7" WCAT-FM, on 106.7, changed its call sign to WCPP (known as "Cool Pop") and changed its format to hot AC. On February 17, 2004, the WCAT-FM call sign was moved to 102.3, the format was again changed to country, and it became "Red 102.3".

Citadel Broadcasting, the station's former owner, merged with Cumulus Media on September 16, 2011. To comply with Department of Justice regulations, WCAT-FM, the license for WWKL, and the intellectual property of WTPA, along with WRSR in Flint, Michigan, were transferred to Potential Broadcasting LLC. In August 2012, Potential Broadcasting sold WCAT-FM to Harold Z. Swidler, owner of WIOO in Carlisle, Pennsylvania. The sale was consummated on November 7, 2012. The studio facilities were relocated from Camp Hill, Pennsylvania, at the former home of Citadel Harrisburg, to Carlisle, Pennsylvania.

The station has a "New Country & The Legends" format, with an emphasis on the local community, as reflected on the official website, boasting "Community-Minded Local Radio. Local Personalities. Local Owners."

== Historic photographs ==
Photo of WZUE logo on a billboard, branded as "Zoo 102"

WHYL-FM Logo, branded as "Country 102"
