= WIOO =

Radio station in Carlisle, Pennsylvania

- Carlisle, Pennsylvania; United States
- Broadcast area: Harrisburg–Carlisle metropolitan area
- Frequency: 1000 kHz
- Branding: Country Gold FM & AM

Programming
- Language: English
- Format: Classic country
- Affiliations: ABC News Radio; Baltimore Orioles; Motor Racing Network; Performance Racing Network; Westwood One

Ownership
- Owner: Harold Z. Swidler; (WIOO, Inc.)
- Sister stations: WCAT-FM; WHYL; WRDD

History
- First air date: July 8, 1965
- Call sign meaning: a numerical representation of the first three digits of the AM frequency 1000

Technical information
- Licensing authority: FCC
- Facility ID: 72985
- Class: D
- Power: 15,000 watts (daytime); 2,700 watts critical hours
- Transmitter coordinates: 40°09′30.32″N 77°11′4.0″W
- Translator: See § Translators

Links
- Public license information: Public file; LMS
- Webcast: Listen live
- Website: wioo.com

WIOO (1000 kHz), known as "Country Gold FM & AM", WIOO is a commercial AM radio station licensed to serve Carlisle, Pennsylvania. The call sign stands for the station's former long-time branding, "W-100", referring to its position on the AM dial. WIOO airs "country gold" format, playing country music from approximately 5–50 years ago. The station is affiliated with Westwood One, and with Motor Racing Network, and Performance Racing Network for extensive NASCAR coverage.

WIOO is a "daytimer", broadcasting at full power from local sunrise to local sunset, and at reduced power from local sunset until 45 minutes later (during "critical hours"), after which it signs off to protect clear channel station WMVP in Chicago from skywave interference. The station's programming is simulcast 24 hours a day on FM translators 97.9 W250AP and 107.3 W297CO both in Carlisle. WIOO also simulcasts the majority of its programming on translator 93.9 W230AX, licensed to serve Shippensburg, Pennsylvania.

WIOO airs local news in Cumberland County, provides the noonday Tradio show for listener call ins each day as part of its one-hour news and information block, and carries live sports including locally produced Cumberland Valley Eagles football on the Carlisle frequencies and Shippensburg Greyhounds football on FM 93.9. The station carries major college and NFL football, NASCAR and Baltimore Orioles baseball during respective seasons.

== History ==
WIOO signed on the air on July 8, 1965, and played contemporary music for most of its history. During the late 1960s and early to mid-1970s, it was a successful Top 40 station which, despite being a daytimer, competed with Harrisburg stations WKBO and WFEC for the teenage audience.

WIOO has a long-standing history of morning personalities dating back to the mid-1960s. They include Bob Hamilton, Dick Raymond, R.J. Harris, Jim (J.J) Jefferson and Marissa Osborne, Ben Barber, Jack Wagner, Scott Donato, Kirk Wise (Wise Guy), Dave Eddy, Larry Flood, and currently on the air veteran broadcaster Hollis Z who doubles as assistant program director. Currently, afternoon drive is handled by air personality and program director Ray Thomas. Ray has been a major force in Carlisle radio for over a quarter of a century. Robin Quivers, now of The Howard Stern Show, received her first radio job on WIOO in late 1979. Quivers beat out a field of three applicants from the Broadcast Institute of Maryland (BIM) to get the news anchor position at WIOO. Robin had worked approximately one year for WIOO before accepting a position at another station.

WIOO was granted a construction permit by the FCC in 2015. The station's day power increased to 15,000 watts, and it gained critical hours power of 2,700 watts. The station's critical hour power is subject to local sunset of WMVP in Chicago, Illinois, on the same frequency.

== Translators ==
WIOO programming is broadcast on the following translators:

Broadcast translators for WIOO
Call sign	Frequency	City of license	FID	ERP (W)	HAAT	Class	Transmitter coordinates	FCC info
W230AX	93.9 FM	Shippensburg, Pennsylvania	141635	145	−27.3 m (−90 ft)	D	40°4′30.3″N 77°32′7.9″W	LMS
W250AP	97.9 FM	Carlisle, Pennsylvania	141619	150	23.3 m (76 ft)	D	40°9′30.3″N 77°11′47.9″W	LMS
W297CO	107.3 FM	Carlisle, Pennsylvania	200351	250	95 m (312 ft)	D	40°17′23.3″N 77°08′8.9″W	LMS
