= R. F. E. Austin =

British physician, naturopath and writer

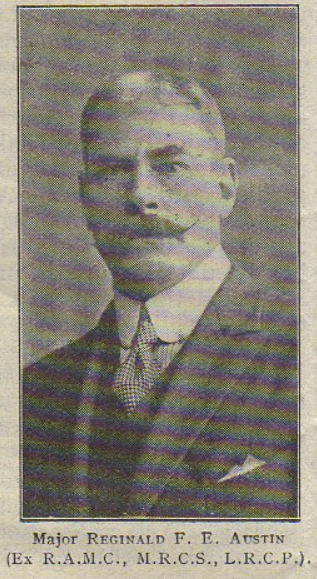
- Born: Reginald Francis Edward Austin; 23 August 1866; Bellary, India
- Died: 1 November 1939 (aged 73)
- Occupations: Physician, writer

Major Reginald Francis Edward Austin (23 August 1866 – 1 November 1939) L.R.C.P., M.R.C.S. was a British physician, naturopath and anti-vaccination activist.

== Biography ==
Austin was born in Bellary, India. He married Georgina Adelaide Seymour on 21 August 1894 in Clifton. Austin obtained his conjoint qualification in 1891 and spent 30 years in India in the military service. He studied posture and respiratory mechanics. Austin was a Major in the Royal Army Medical Corps. In 1911, he was a Specialist in Laryngology for the 3rd (Lahore) Division. In 1912, he was Civil Surgeon at Kasauli for the Indian Medical Service.

In the 1920s, Austin was practicing naturopathy in London and attending anti-vaccination meetings. In 1928, he worked at the Nature Cure Clinic and Hospital on Baker Street that was founded by Nina Hosali. Austin authored the book Direct Paths to Health which promoted naturopathic principles. He argued against the use of drugs and vaccines and instead promoted diet, fasting, respiratory exercises and osteopathic manipulations. Austin was a witness for the defence of Walter Hadwen during his trial. He was an anti-vivisectionist and a committee member of the British Union for the Abolition of Vivisection.

Austin authored articles for the naturopathic journal Health and Efficiency. He stated that germs do not cause disease and attacked the use of aspirin. He supported the naturopathic treatment of cancer and criticized orthodox medical practice. He authored a controversial article which denounced the operation of appendectomy as unnecessary and implied that the medical profession performed it out of financial interest. Austin was accused of advertising his own naturopathic treatments whilst disapproving of others. He received a letter from the British Medical Association and was summoned before the General Medical Council. Austin apologized within a year and his name was not erased from the register. He continued to write for naturopathic journals but was more cautious in advertising treatments. In the 1930s, Austin denounced blood transfusion as "unscientific and useless".

== Selected publications ==
- Natural Painless Child-Birth (The Indian Medical Gazette, 1918)
- Some New Principles in Nutrition (The Indian Medical Gazette, 1918)
- A Plea for Simplicity in the Prevention and Cure of Bacterial Infection (The Indian Medical Gazette, 1919)
- The Natural Cure and Prevention of Dysentery (The Indian Medical Gazette, 1920)
- Direct Paths to Health (C. W. Daniel Company, 1922)
- The Straight Spine (The British Medical Journal, 1925)

== See also ==
- J. Stenson Hooker
