= WHYL =

- Carlisle, Pennsylvania; United States
- Broadcast area: Harrisburg metropolitan area
- Frequency: 960 kHz
- Branding: 102.9 HYL FM

Programming
- Format: Oldies
- Affiliations: Baltimore Orioles Radio Network

Ownership
- Owner: Harold Z. Swidler; (WHYL, Inc.)
- Sister stations: WCAT-FM; WIOO; WRDD

History
- First air date: December 6, 1948
- Former call signs: WLXW (1948–1952)
- Former frequencies: 1380 kHz (1948–1953)
- Call sign meaning: Harrisburg, York, Lancaster

Technical information
- Licensing authority: FCC
- Facility ID: 74556
- Class: D
- Power: 5,000 watts (day); 22 watts (night)
- Transmitter coordinates: 40°11′34.32″N 77°10′2″W
- Translator: See § Translator

Links
- Public license information: Public file; LMS
- Webcast: Listen Live
- Website: 1029whyl.com

WHYL (960 AM) is a commercial radio station licensed to Carlisle, Pennsylvania, United States, and serving the Harrisburg metropolitan area. Owned by Harold Z. Swidler, with the license held by WHYL, Inc., it broadcasts an oldies format. It also carries Baltimore Orioles baseball games. The station's studios and transmitter are located in Carlisle; WHYL is also relayed over low-power FM translator W275CJ (102.9 FM).

== History ==
Promotional publication, dated August 19, 1967 (page 1)

Promotional publication, dated August 19, 1967 (page 2)

The station went on the air as WLXW on December 4, 1948; one of its first broadcasts was Santa coming to Carlisle. Its first license was granted on February 25, 1949, according to records from the Federal Communications Commission (FCC). The station operated from a building just south of town along Route 34. The directional array tower system that was used formed a dual lobe pattern extending east-west from around Morgantown to around Everett. The original owner was Col. Phillip Matthews, state Democratic chairman. The 1,000-watt station operated daytime-only on a frequency of 1380 kHz. Jerry McDevitt, formerly of Altoona, was the manager of the station. The Rev. Harry Lee of Carlisle and Vincent Shafmeister of Camp Hill, a student at Dickinson College, were full-time announcers. Dave Taylor, also a Dickinson student, was a part-time announcer. The station was located on Mt. Holly Pike, 0.25 miles (0.40 km) south of town. It was contained in a one-story structure, which had two studios, control room, newsroom with teletype, a record library and five offices. The 187-foot (57 m) tower was at the same location.

On November 1, 1952, Richard Field Lewis Jr. (1907–1957) added WLXW to the Richard Field Lewis Jr. Stations (later Mid Atlantic Network Inc.). Lewis changed the call sign to WHYL on November 10, and moved the station to 960 kHz the following year.

In 1965, the Lewis family hired Jim Frank from Iowa, a.k.a. Jack O. Lantern, to "modernize" the station. WIOO was set to start broadcasting and it was obvious they planned on being a "rocker". WHYL was changed to a "hot" Top 40 station and some of the personnel was changed. Jack O. Lantern became the morning man and the station became a hit maker in the area. Lantern was awarded a "gold" record by Matty "Humdinger" Singer from Universal records in Philadelphia for breaking and promoting a new record called "Oh Sweet Pea" to number one in the country. Lantern remained with the station until he formed a partnership with George Gardiner, the owner of Carlisle Cable Co. and together they built a brand new radio station called WEEO in Waynesboro, Pennsylvania. New logos like "The Smile Guys" were created by Lantern to bolster its new popularity. In 1966, Ben (Shatto) Barber joined the station (pictured in The Channel 96 WHYL Smile Guys, last head shot at the bottom) as the afternoon drive personality.

WHYL flipped to country music in 1980. On December 10, 1984, Post-sunset authorization was granted and began.

In 1989, the station was sold to Lincoln Zeve under Zeve Broadcasting, who flips format to adult standards. In 2002, Citadel Broadcasting purchased the station and flips format to the "Music of Your Life" network. Two years later, Citadel sold WHYL to start-up company Route 81 Radio. On March 6, 2004, Route 81 dropped Music of Your Life for locally-originated adult standards. On February 14, 2005, WHYL changed to talk format in an effort to compete with long-time talker WHP. On November 24, 2005, the station began another format flip, stunting with an all-Christmas music format. On January 2, 2006, the station returned to adult standards.

On January 15, 2007, Royal Broadcasting signed an asset purchase agreement to buy the station and began to operate it under a local marketing agreement (LMA). On January 14, 2008, Royal Broadcasting ended the LMA because of the untimely processing of the request by the FCC, partly due to a petition to deny filed on the license renewal. Ownership defaults back to Route 81 Radio. The petition to deny was rejected by FCC; on July 15, 2008, Trustworthy Radio LLC took over under an LMA, with original Route 81 GM Bruce Collier returning as half-owner.

As of January 1, 2014, the station was off the air and no carrier signal was being broadcast. The station had filed for bankruptcy in 2012. Longtime morning host Ben Barber left the station in late 2013, at which time other programs, including the syndicated John Tesh midday show, were also dropped. The station broadcasts were fully automated after this, and there were some periods during which a carrier signal was broadcast without any programming. In June 2014, Harold Z. Swidler purchased the station, planning to return it to the air at partial power and eventually at full power.

On March 7, 2015, WHYL returned to the air with an oldies format, branded as "Good Time Oldies 960".

In 2015 and 2016, WHYL used a single element temporary antenna located on the tower with WCAT-FM "Red 102.3". The station was operating under special temporary authority (STA) requested on December 19, 2014, and granted on March 10, 2015. The STA was extended on April 13, 2016, and expired on October 13, 2016. This allowed operation at the station's daytime nondirectional (omnidirectional antenna) power of 1.3 kilowatts and a nighttime power of 22 watts. The request was for 27 watts and reduced by the FCC to 22.

In mid-2016, WHYL began simulcasting on translator W275CJ and was rebranded as "Good Time Oldies 102.9 WHYL".

== Translator ==
WHYL programming is broadcast on the following translator:

Broadcast translator for WHYL
Call sign	Frequency	City of license	FID	ERP (W)	HAAT	Class	Transmitter coordinates	FCC info
W275CJ	102.9 FM	Carlisle, Pennsylvania	141661	160	95 m (312 ft)	D	40°17′23.3″N 77°8′8.9″W	LMS
