= Carlisle Fairgrounds =

Fairgrounds in Carlisle, Pennsylvania, U.S.

- Interactive map of Carlisle Fairgrounds
- Address: 1000 Bryn Mawr Road
- Location: Carlisle, Pennsylvania
- Coordinates: 40.216369°N 77.185208°W
- Owner: Carlisle Events
- Type: Fairground

Website
- Official website

Carlisle Fairgrounds is located in downtown Carlisle, Pennsylvania. It is the home of Carlisle Events and the location for the largest collector car and truck events in the country. Prior to Carlisle Events' emergence, anyone interested in restoring or showing 1950s- or 1960s-era cars had few options. That all changed when Chip Miller and Bill Miller Jr. became friends through a mutual interest in cars of the 1950s. Together they began going to car shows and swap meets, where like-minded individuals would hunt for parts and accessories to restore their vehicles. A need for these events became obvious to these two men in 1973. Until that time, the only cars deemed worthy to collect were pre-WWII automobiles. Carlisle Events was one of the first companies in the United States organized specifically to conduct and promote events for the collector car and truck hobby.

On September 26, 1974, on the rented Carlisle Fairgrounds, "Post War '74" took place. It was the very first car event promoted by the company. In a year still remembered for gas lines and inflation, nearly 600 vendors set up in more than 800 spaces, and 13,000 spectators paid the $1 admission to sample their wares.

Within a few years, the Carlisle Fairgrounds had become a mecca for collector car enthusiasts all over the world. The runaway success of what became known as Fall Carlisle Collector Car Swap Meet & Car Corral led to a similar Spring event in 1977. In short order, they became complete sellouts for vendor and car sale (or "car corral") spaces. In 1981, after renting the fairgrounds for each event, the Millers purchased the 82-acre (330,000 m^{2}) property.

Over the years, Carlisle Events has transformed the fairgrounds to suit the needs of car show participants and visitors. Continuous improvements include paved roads, a manicured landscape and more than 10 permanent buildings. At the same time, Carlisle Events has established consumer-friendly services such as on-site bank financing, notary and title service and a wide variety of dining choices.

== Events ==
When Chip and Bill Miller held their first car show at the Carlisle Fairgrounds in 1974, they never could have envisioned the growth and legacy of Carlisle Events. Chip Miller, co-founder of Carlisle Events, had a favorite saying, “Life is Good.” His son Lance has carried on that tradition, and it appears he will continue to carry on a lot more at Carlisle Events with his long-time friend, Bill Miller III. In 2007, Bill Miller Jr., announced that Lance Miller and Bill Miller III, his son, will continue in their respective families’ tradition of operating the Carlisle Events business at the Carlisle Fairgrounds.

Throughout the 40+ years of existence, the Miller families continued to add specialty shows to their event seasons. Carlisle Events produces six specialty shows, and four swap meet events. In addition, relative company Carlisle Auctions produces four collector car auctions each year. The specialty shows include Carlisle Import & Performance Nationals, Carlisle Ford Nationals, Carlisle GM Nationals, Carlisle Chrysler Nationals, Carlisle Truck Nationals, and Corvettes at Carlisle. Swap Meet events include Auto Mania in Allentown, Pennsylvania, and Spring Carlisle, Fall Carlisle, and Winter Carlisle Auto Expo in Carlisle, Pennsylvania.

The Carlisle-based events bring in $97 million annually to the local economy and Spring Carlisle is the organization's biggest draw of the year, hosting over 100,000 guests from around the world.
