= David J. Smyth =

American politician

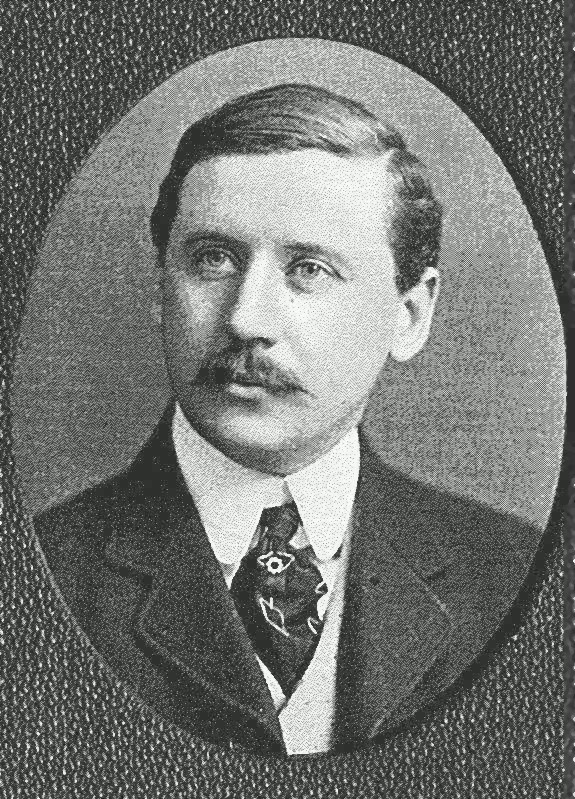
David J. Smyth

David J. Smyth (26 July 1872 – 4 December 1954) was a member of the Pennsylvania House of Representatives in 1901–02.

He was described by Rudolph Blankenburg as having been dismissed as director of public safety in Philadelphia "for the good of the service".
