= David L. Smith (politician) =

American politician (1827–1902)

Member of the Pennsylvania House of Representatives from the Allegheny County district
- In office 1868–1868
- In office 1855–1855

Personal details
- Born: February 4, 1827 Carlisle, Pennsylvania, U.S.
- Died: 1902 (aged 74–75) Chester County, Pennsylvania, U.S.
- Resting place: Upper Octorara Church Cemetery; Parkesburg, Pennsylvania, U.S.
- Party: Know Nothing; Republican
- Spouse(s): Elizabeth Gordon (m. 1852; died 1877) Helen M. Armstrong (m. 1880)
- Children: 3
- Occupation: Politician; farmer

David L. Smith (February 4, 1827 – 1902) was an American politician from Pennsylvania. He served as a member of the Pennsylvania House of Representatives, representing Allegheny County in 1855 and 1868.

== Early life ==
David L. Smith was born on February 4, 1827 (or 1826), in Carlisle, Pennsylvania, to Eleanora (née Shrom) and Daniel Smith. His father served in the War of 1812 and was a blacksmith and farmer. Smith grew up in Cumberland and Allegheny counties.

== Career ==
Smith worked as a farmer. He was a Know Nothing and served as a member of the Pennsylvania House of Representatives, representing Allegheny County in 1855. He was appointed chief clerk of the commissioner's office in Allegheny County and resigned the role in 1861.

In 1861, Smith enlisted with Company A of the 2nd Virginia Infantry Regiment and was elected first lieutenant. In February 1862, he was appointed assistant commissary of volunteers and was promoted to chief commissary of the XII Corps on September 7, 1862. He served in that role until March 16, 1863. He was promoted to lieutenant colonel and aide-de-camp. He worked on the staff of General George Meade under the V Corps until the end of the war. He was honorably discharged on March 16, 1866.

After the war, Smith moved back to Allegheny County. He was elected as a Republican to the Pennsylvania House of Representatives, representing Allegheny County in 1868. In 1870, he was elected alderman of Allegheny. He served in that role until 1871. Smith served in the city council of Allegheny and was a member of the school board of Allegheny for 12 years. He moved to a farm in Pomeroy of Sadsbury Township, Chester County.

== Personal life ==
Smith married Elizabeth Gordon, daughter of Robert Gordon, of Pittsburgh on September 7, 1852. They had one son and two daughters, Frank C., Eleanora and Mary E. His wife died in 1877. He married Helen M. (née Wallace) Armstrong, daughter of Arthur Wallace of Highland Township and widow of Charles C. Armstrong, on March 7, 1880.

Smith died in 1902 in Chester County. He was buried in Upper Octorara Church Cemetery in Parkesburg.
