= Jack Perraton =

Australian cricketer

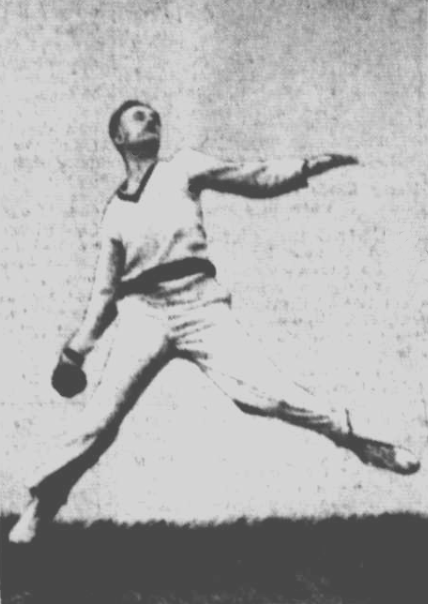

Personal information
- Born: 26 February 1909; Melbourne, Australia
- Died: 1 October 1950 (aged 41); Kings Cross, New South Wales, Australia

Domestic team information
- Years: Team
- 1929-1931: Victoria
- Source: Cricinfo, 21 November 2015

Jack Perraton (26 February 1909 – 1 October 1950) was an Australian cricketer. He played four first-class cricket matches for Victoria between 1929 and 1931.

== See also ==
- List of Victoria first-class cricketers
