= David M. Smith (virologist) =

American translational research virologist (born 1971)

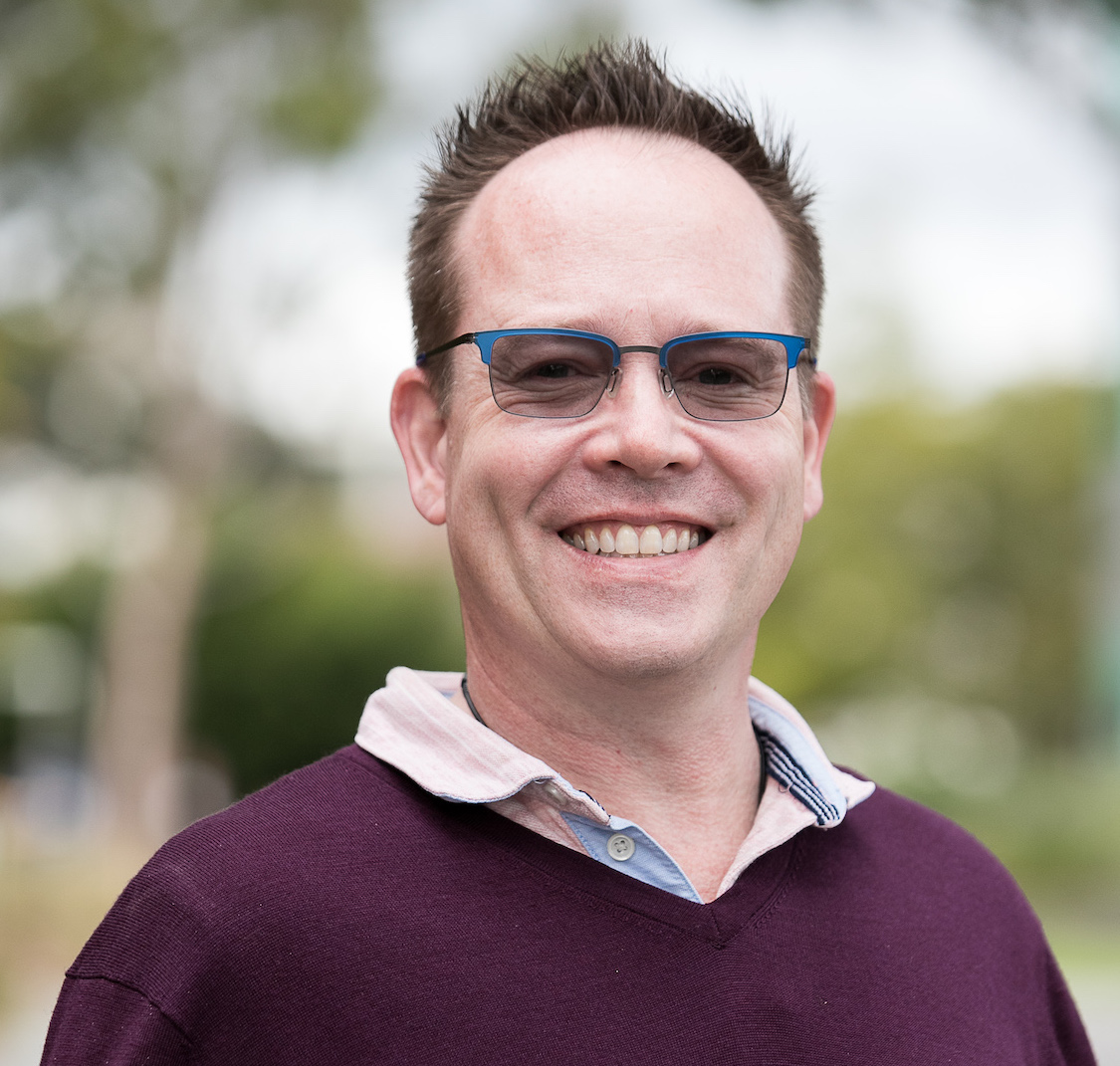
- Born: October 16, 1971 (age 54)
- Other name: Davey Smith
- Education: University of Tennessee, Chattanooga and East Tennessee State University College of Medicine
- Scientific career
- Workplaces: UC San Diego School of Medicine

David "Davey" M. Smith (born October 16, 1971), is an American translational research virologist, chief of the Division of Infectious Diseases and Global Public Health at the University of California San Diego (UC San Diego), co-director of the San Diego Center for AIDS Research (SD CFAR), and vice chair of research in the Department of Medicine at UC San Diego. His research interests include transmission, prevention, and treatment of both HIV and SARS-CoV2 (COVID-19). Since joining the UC San Diego faculty in 2003, Smith has been awarded more than $37 million in federal funding as a principal investigator. His research interests include transmission, prevention, and treatment of both HIV and COVID-19.

== Career ==
=== Early career ===
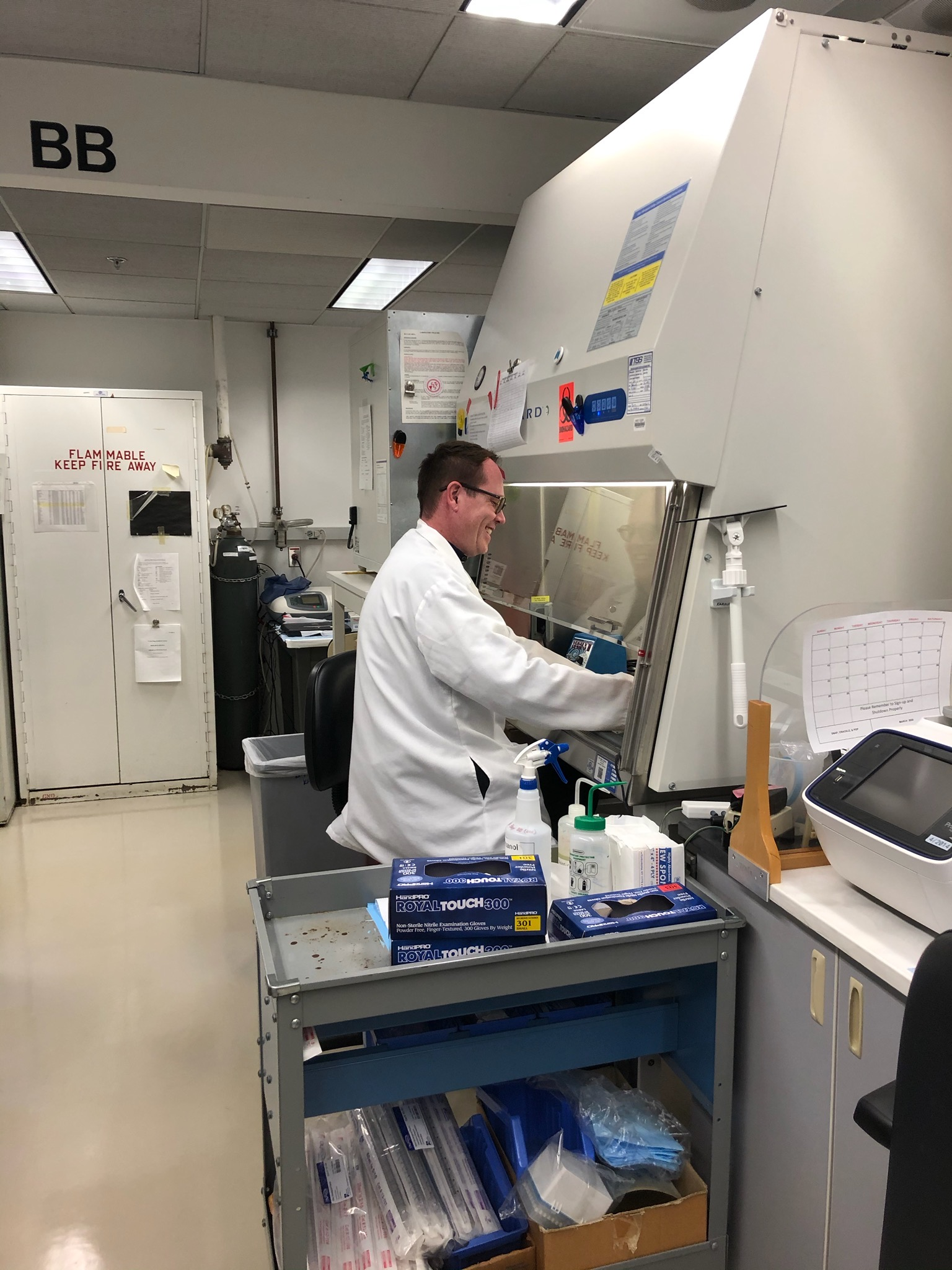
Davey Smith working in the lab

Smith earned his BS in biology (summa cum laude) in 1992 from the University of Tennessee, Chattanooga, and his MD from East Tennessee State University College of Medicine in Johnson City in 1996. He then moved to the University of California San Diego (UC San Diego), where he completed his internship and residency (1999), chief residency (2000), a fellowship in infectious diseases (2003), and earned his MAS in clinical research (2005). Smith is board certified in infectious diseases, and a Fellow of both the American College of Physicians and the Infectious Diseases Society of America. In 2015, he was elected to the American Society for Clinical Investigation.

In 2003, Smith was appointed assistant adjunct professor of medicine at UC San Diego. He was promoted to associate professor of medicine in residence in 2009, and named co-director of the San Diego Center for AIDS Research (SD CFAR) in 2014. He was promoted to professor in 2013 and then vice chair of faculty in 2016. In 2017, Smith began his service as chief of the Division of Infectious Diseases and Global Public Health, where he oversees more than 100 faculty.

In addition to his academic and administrative appointments at UC San Diego, in 2001 Smith helped found The Night Clinic of Family Health Centers of San Diego, where he continues to serve as medical director. The Night Clinic provides culturally competent medical care to gay men and transgender individuals. He has also served the VA San Diego Healthcare System since 2005 as a staff physician and director of the HIV/HCV and HIV/HPV Co-infections Clinics.

=== HIV research ===
Smith is a translational research virologist. He applies laboratory research to inform clinical studies and vice versa in the U.S. and internationally. He studies HIV transmission, including HIV superinfection, molecular epidemiology, and the characteristics of HIV found in the genital tract. One of Smith's most innovative projects to date is the NIH-funded Last Gift Study, designed to identify hidden reservoirs of HIV through rapid autopsies of individuals who lived with HIV and were diagnosed with an unrelated terminal illness, such as cancer, neurological conditions, or end-stage organ failure. In summary, Smith's research represents an effort to understand the drivers of HIV transmission and find new ways to interrupt them.

=== SARS-CoV-2 research ===
In late 2019, when reports of a novel coronavirus began circulating, Smith immediately began investigating causes, preventatives, and potential cures with colleagues in the Division of Infectious Diseases and Global Public Health at UC San Diego. He currently leads or contributes to a number of COVID-19 studies at UC San Diego and across the United States. Smith was also instrumental in coordinating a $1 million donation from the John and Mary Tu Foundation to support his COVID-19 clinical research activities. Additionally, in March 2020, in his role as co-director of the San Diego Center for AIDS Research (SD CFAR), Smith encouraged collaborative partnerships across the 17 NIH-funded Centers for AIDS Research (CFARs) to pool laboratory equipment, methods, and knowledge applicable to HIV and easily transferable to studies of COVID-19

== Awards and honors ==
Smith has earned numerous accolades for his academic success. In 2002, he received the Associate Investigator Award from the VA San Diego Healthcare System. In 2005, he was elected to the National Center for Leadership in Academic Medicine at UC San Diego. Also in 2005, Discover Magazine acknowledged one of Smith's papers on HIV superinfection as #41 of the top 100 stories of 2004. In 2008, Smith earned San Diego Metropolitan magazine's 40 Under 40 award, which annually recognizes local young leaders. In 2010, Smith received the HIV Medical Association Research Award, presented by the Infectious Diseases Society of America. In 2012, the National Institute of Drug Abuse (NIDA) named Smith a recipient of a $2.5 million Avant Garde Award in HIV Prevention for his proposal on “Molecular Epidemiology for HIV Prevention for Drug Users and Other Risk Groups”. And in both 2012 and 2014, Smith received Internal Medicine Residency Teaching Awards presented by UC San Diego's Chief Medical Residents.

Smith also has received recognition for his community involvement, beginning in 2001, when he earned the Men's Volunteer Award from the San Diego Lesbian, Gay, Bisexual, and Transgender Community Center (LGBT Center). In 2005, he received the Transgender Community Coalition Community Service Award, as well as the Outstanding Volunteer of the Year Award (Medical) from AIDS Walk San Diego. In 2009, he received the prestigious A. Brad Truax Award for outstanding HIV/AIDS service, presented by the County of San Diego Health and Human Services Agency.

== Professional Failures ==
Smith believes in highlighting professional challenges and failures. He thinks it is important to acknowledge that being a physician scientist requires resilience, and that it helps others who are trying to be physician scientists to openly share such "failures”.

== Personal ==
In addition to academic and clinical research, Smith has developed equal passions for creative writing, travel, and adventurous dining. His friend and colleague, Sanjay R. Mehta, MD, assistant professor of medicine at UC San Diego, said in 2013, “If this HIV stuff gets boring for [Smith], he'll do great as the next host of ‘Bizarre Foods,' as he's willing to test his palate all over the world.” Smith has published poems in JAMA and Annals of Internal Medicine, and still finds time to write. He is currently writing a book on becoming a virologist physician scientist in the time of viral pandemics.

In 2015, Smith married his long-time partner, Asherlev Santos, assistant professor in the Public Health graduate program at California State University San Marcos.
