= David Boyes Smith =

Deputy surgeon general of the Indian Medical Service

- Born: 19 November 1833
- Died: 3 June 1889 (aged 55)
- Education: University of Edinburgh
- Occupation: Deputy surgeon general of the Indian Medical Service
- Known for: Founder of The Indian Medical Gazette

David Boyes Smith (19 November 1833 - 3 June 1889) was deputy surgeon general of the Indian Medical Service (IMS).

== Early life ==
David Boyes Smith was born on 19 November 1833. He studied medicine at the University of Edinburgh, where he was president of the Royal Medical Society.

== Career ==
Smith joined the Indian Medical Service in November 1855 and served during the Indian Rebellion of 1857. He was civil surgeon of Delhi, Mussoorie, Patna, Dacca, and Howrah, and became the first Sanitary Commissioner with the Government of Bengal in 1863.

In 1866 Smith founded The Indian Medical Gazette and afterwards was appointed principal of the Medical College, and First Physician in the Medical College Hospital, Calcutta. When he left India in 1885 he was elected professor of Military Medicine and Tropical Diseases, at the Army Medical School, Netley.

== Personal and later life ==
Smith married after retirement. He had one daughter.

== Death ==
Smith died on 3 June 1889 in Woolston, Southampton.

Not fulfilling the criteria for a military pension fund, Smith's friends set up a fund following his death, to help support his widow and daughter, the ‘David Boyes Smith Fund’.

== Selected publications ==
Report on the Drainage and Conservancy of Calcutta, Sanitary Commission for Bengal, 1869.
