= David Brian Smith =

British artist

David Brian Smith (born 1981), is a London-based contemporary artist from Wolverhampton, United Kingdom. He is known for his thought-provoking and visually stunning paintings, which have been featured in exhibitions and art fairs in the United Kingdom, Belgium, Germany, and elsewhere.

David Brian Smith studied at Wolverhampton University and Chelsea College of Art and Design, London.

David Brian Smith's paintings fall into two distinct periods with two dramatically different styles. First after Chelsea school of Art came the monochromatic formalist series of canvases. Then from around 2006 his style underwent a dramatic change from mono to full color palette & from non representational to figurative surrealism.

Smith's began working with Carl Freedman Gallery in London starting with his 2007 exhibition, I Believe in Everything, which was followed by his 2010 exhibition Great Expectations with the same gallery. In the same year, Smith's work was included in "Newspeak: British Art Now" at The Saatchi Gallery in London in 2010. Since 2007, Smith has had at least six solo shows and participated in 22 group shows, with exhibitions at galleries such as Baronian in Brussels and Abbaye St André - Centre d'art contemporain Meymac in Meymac.

David Brian Smith is best known for his figurative paintings that draw on the pictorial tradition of landscape and portrait painting. Smith uses his family history and found images as inspiration, resulting in works that depict a dreamlike world rich in color and alluding to a rural environment, folklore, and myths.

Smith's paintings are created on herringbone linen, with a rough texture reminiscent of the traditional fabrics worn in the British countryside, where the artist originally hails from. His compositions are built up slowly through a time-consuming process of successive touches of oil paint, sometimes including silver or gold leaf. The resulting paintings envelop the viewer in a meditative and spiritual atmosphere, bordering on the psychedelic.

Smith's work is characterized by recurrent patterns and archetypal figures, including a solitary shepherd and a man sitting on a giant anthill, colonial hat in hand. According to art critic Amy Sherlock, the shepherd symbolizes memory, representing a historical or imagined past.

Smith is represented by Galerie Isa, Mumbai Althuis Hofland, Amsterdam Baronian, Brussels and Xippas, Geneva and Paris.
