= David G. Smith =

American singer-songwriter

David G Smith
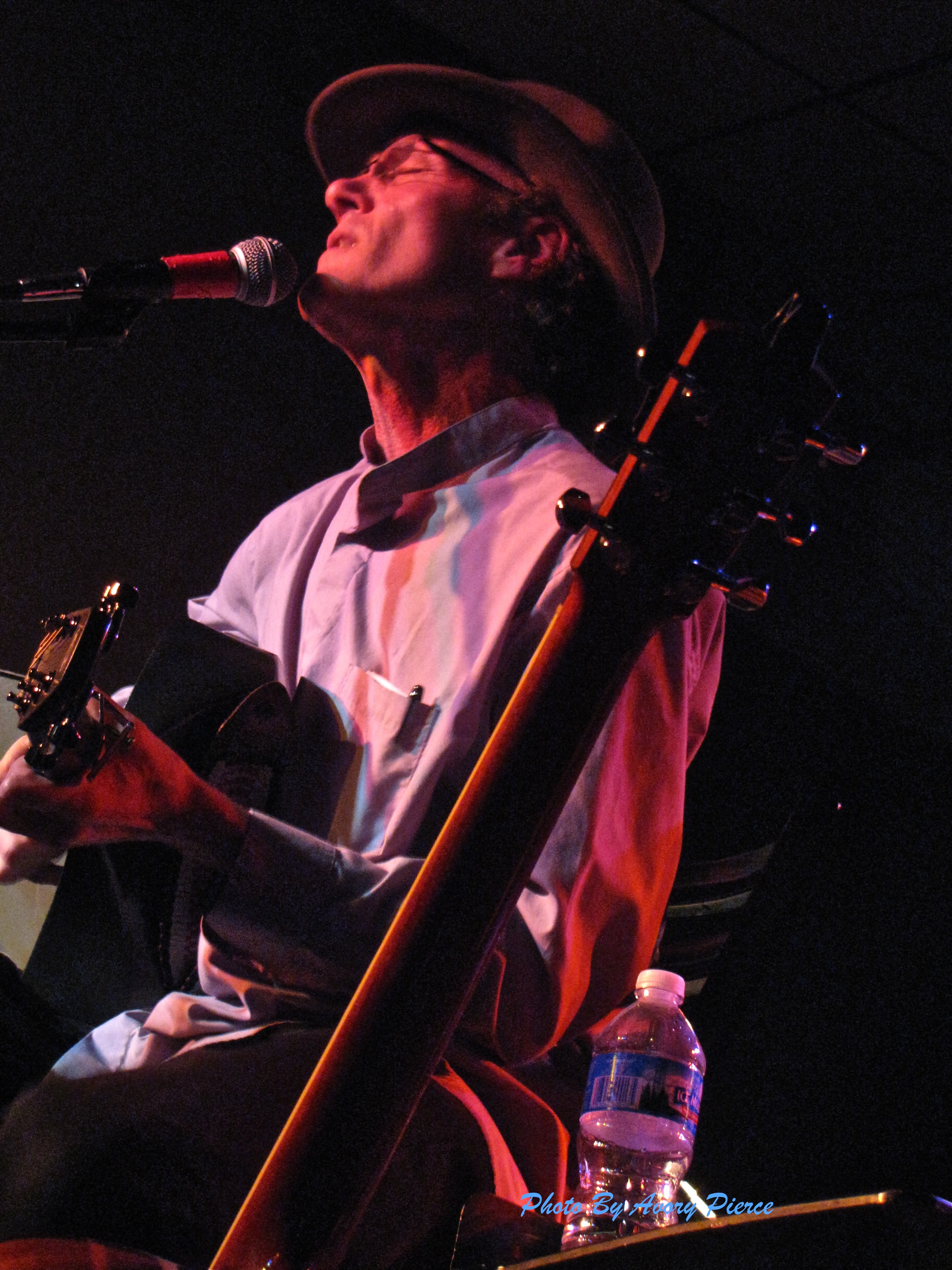

Background information
- Origin: Cascade, Iowa, U.S.
- Genres: Americana, Alt-Folk, Country
- Occupations: Songwriter, performer, musician
- Instruments: Vocals, guitar, resonator, piano
- Label: Hey Dave Music
- Website: davidgsmithmusic.com

David G. Smith is an American singer-songwriter, based in Nashville, Tennessee. He has released eight albums since 2011 and has hosted shows at the Bluebird Cafe since the mid 2000s.

== Career ==
As an artist in the 1970s, Smith released a single he wrote called "Positive Side" as a member of the Colorado-based Robin Banks Band, under the stage name "David Gibran". Smith moved from Colorado to Nashville in 1984 to focus on his work as a songwriter.

Smith has independently released eight albums that have received positive coverage in The Tennessean, No Depression, and Elmore. He received the Robert K. Oermann DisCovery Award, (Music Row/Nashville) for his album Non-Fiction in 2011. His album One House appeared on No Depression/Lee Zimmerman's list of "10 Terrific Albums To Listen To Right Now." His album First Love reached No.1 on the Roots Music Album Chart for Iowa in 2016. Artists Keb Mo and Mary Gauthier have made guest appearances on his albums.

One of his songs, "Angels Flew", is listed on the 9/11 Memorial Museum Artist Registry. His song "Made For You" won first place in the Country category in the 2008 International Songwriting Competition. His song "Sunday Morning Drive", co-written with Anne E. DeChant, reached No.1 on the Roots Music Alt Folk Chart in 2015.

He has hosted shows at the Bluebird Café in Nashville since the mid 2000s, and performed in several Tin Pan South events over the years.

He splits his time between Nashville and his native Iowa. Smith donates his time and raises money for various causes including Rett syndrome, Parkinson's Disease, and Alzheimer's Disease.

== Discography ==
- Non-Fiction (2011)
- The Family Smith: Live From Nashville (2012)
- One House (2013)
- Live From The Ellen Kennedy Fine Arts Center w/ Justin Townes Earle (Virtual Release: 2014)
- The Family Smith: Live @ The Redstone (2015)
- First Love (2016)
- Who Cares (2019)
- Witness Trees (2023)
