= David Smith (cricketer, born 1970) =

English cricketer

Personal information
- Full name: David Thomas Smith
- Born: 13 June 1970 (age 56); Salford, Lancashire, England
- Batting: Left-handed
- Bowling: Right-arm medium

Domestic team information
- Years: Team
- 1992–1994: Cumberland

Career statistics
Competition	List A
Matches	1
Runs scored	17
Batting average	17.00
100s/50s	–/–
Top score	17
Balls bowled	–
Wickets	–
Bowling average	–
5 wickets in innings	–
10 wickets in match	–
Best bowling	–
Catches/stumpings	–/–
- Source: Cricinfo, 26 March 2011

David Thomas Smith (born 13 June 1970) is a former English cricketer. Smith was a left-handed batsman who bowled right-arm medium pace. He was born in Salford, Lancashire.

Smith made his debut for Cumberland in the 1992 Minor Counties Championship against Lincolnshire. He played Minor counties cricket for Cumberland from 1992 to 1994, including a single MCCA Knockout Trophy match in his final season. In his time with Cumberland, Smith played a single List A match in the 1994 NatWest Trophy against Leicestershire. In the match he scored 17 runs before being dismissed by Alan Mullally.

He had previously played Second XI cricket for the Lancashire Second XI and the Derbyshire Second XI.
