= David Andrew Smith =

David Andrew Smith (born March 5, 1952) is a former deputy director of the United Nations Information Centre (UNIC) in Washington DC. In 2010 he was named as Director of the United Nations Information Centre in Buenos Aires, Argentina. A successor was named in 2016. Previously, he worked as an award-winning TV correspondent with ITN and Channel 4 News. In January 2008, The Daily Telegraph identified him as one of the most influential Britons in America. Mr. Smith, a national of the United Kingdom, holds a Master of Arts degree in humanities from Lincoln College, Oxford University. He is married and has three sons and one daughter.

== Biography ==
Smith was born in 1952, the son of John and Patricia Smith. He was educated at Oxford University, where he received BA Hons and MA. He was a Reuters correspondent in Spain and Italy between 1975 and 1978 and then, working for ITN and Channel 4 News, reported from Africa and was Middle East Correspondent, Moscow Correspondent, Diplomatic Correspondent and United States Correspondent. While working as a TV correspondent, he wrote two books, a biography of Robert Mugabe and a study of Israel's relationship with the Palestinians. He also taught journalism as a visiting professor at the Universities of Michigan and Maryland, focusing on the role of the foreign correspondent in influencing foreign policy. In 2004, he joined the United Nations Information Centre in Washington, D.C., and represented UN Secretary-General Ban Ki-moon in the Americas from 2004 to 2014.

== Awards ==
- International Reporting Award, Royal Television Society, London 1983
- Gold Medal, New York Television Festival, 2000

== Publications ==
- Mugabe, a biography, (Sphere Books, London, 1981) ISBN 0-7221-7868-9
- Prisoners of God, the Modern-day conflict of Arab and Israeli (Quartet Books, London 1987) ISBN 0-7043-2607-8
