= Carlisle, Pennsylvania =

Borough in Pennsylvania, US

- Borough
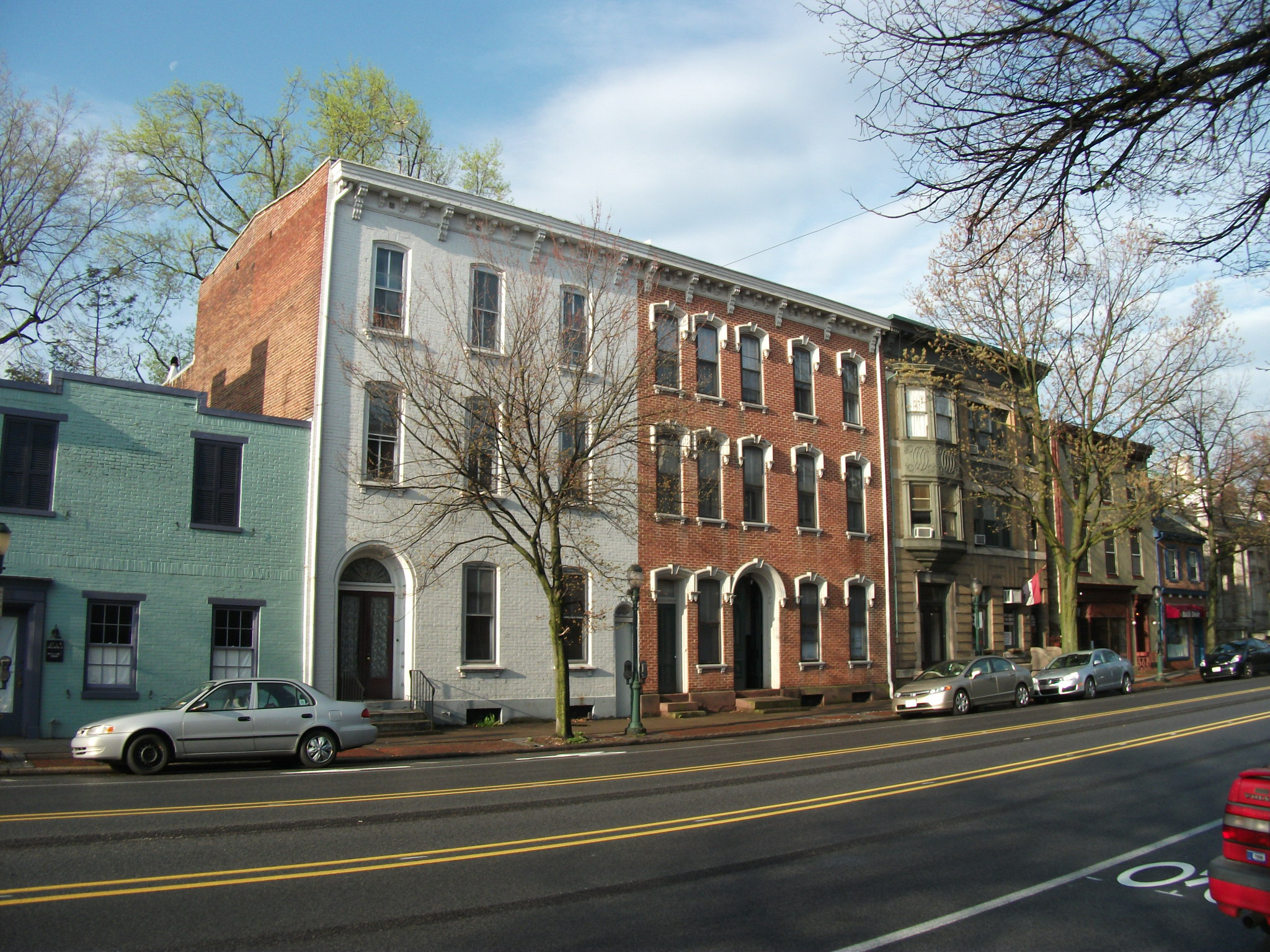
- Downtown Carlisle in April 2011

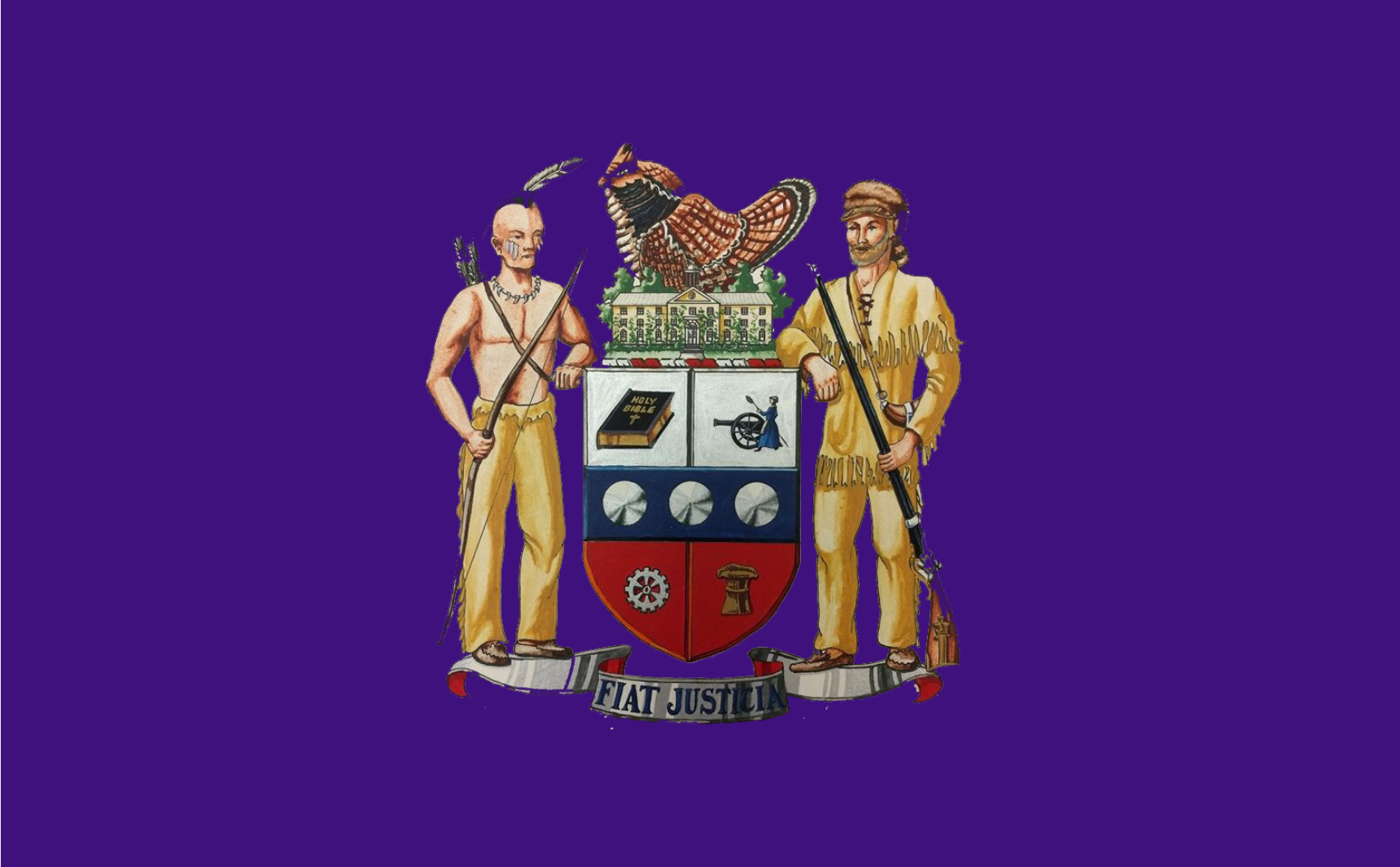
- Flag Seal
- Motto: "Excellence in Community Service"
- Location of Carlisle in Cumberland County, Pennsylvania

- Location of Carlisle in Pennsylvania and the United States Carlisle (the United States)
- Coordinates: 40°12′09″N 77°11′42″W
- Country: United States
- State: Pennsylvania
- County: Cumberland
- Settled: 1751
- Incorporated: 1782
- Named for: Carlisle, England

Government
  - Type: Borough Council
  - Mayor: Sean Shultz (D)
  - Deputy Mayor: Safronia Perry (D)

Area
  - Total: 5.43 sq mi (14.07 km^{2})
  - Land: 5.42 sq mi (14.05 km^{2})
  - Water: 0.0077 sq mi (0.02 km^{2})
- Elevation: 479 ft (146 m)

Population (2020)
  - Total: 20,118
  - Density: 3,709.4/sq mi (1,432.19/km^{2})
- Time zone: UTC-5 (Eastern (EST))
  - Summer (DST): UTC-4 (EDT)
- ZIP Codes: 17013, 17015
- Area codes: 717 and 223
- FIPS code: 42-11272
- Website: www.carlislepa.org

Carlisle is a borough in and the county seat of Cumberland County, Pennsylvania, United States. Carlisle is located within the Cumberland Valley, a highly productive agricultural region. As of the 2020 census, the borough population was 20,118; including suburbs in the neighboring townships, 37,695 live in the Carlisle urban cluster. Carlisle is the smaller principal city of the Harrisburg–Carlisle metropolitan statistical area, which includes Cumberland and Dauphin and Perry counties in South Central Pennsylvania.

The U.S. Army War College, located at Carlisle Barracks, prepares high-level military personnel and civilians for strategic leadership responsibilities. The Carlisle Barracks ranks among the oldest U.S. Army installations and the most senior military educational institution in the United States Army. Carlisle Barracks is home of the United States Army Heritage and Education Center, an archives and museum complex open to the public. Carlisle is also home to Penn State Dickinson School of Law and Dickinson College. Dickinson College was the first college or university chartered after the United States was founded.

== History ==
The French-born fur trader James Le Tort may have built a cabin in the area as early as 1720. During the colonial era, Scots-Irish settlers began to settle in the Cumberland Valley beginning in the early 1730s. The settlement of Carlisle, at the intersection of several Indigenous trails, was designated by the Pennsylvania assembly and the Penn family in 1751 as the seat of Cumberland County (named for the county of the same name in England). American engineer John Armstrong Sr., a surveyor for the Penn family, laid the plan for the settlement of Carlisle in 1751. Armstrong Sr. settled there and fathered John Armstrong Jr. in 1758. They named the settlement after its sister town of the same name in Cumberland, England, and even designed its former jailhouse (which now serve as general government offices in the county) to resemble the Carlisle Citadel.

As a result of conflicts on the frontier with Native American tribes, a stockade was constructed in the settlement to protect against potential attacks in 1753. In 1755, the stockade was transformed into a fort, known as Carlisle Fort or Fort Lowther. In 1757, colonel-commandant John Stanwix, for whom Fort Stanwix in Upstate New York was named, established his headquarters in Carlisle, and was promoted to brigadier general on December 27. During the French and Indian War, the North American theater of the Seven Years' War, the largely successful Forbes Expedition was organized in Carlisle in 1758; Henry Bouquet also organized a military expedition from the settlement in 1763 during Pontiac's War.

The Pennsylvania guide, compiled by the Writers' Program of the WPA in 1940, described the early history of Carlisle's public square and the physical changes that had occurred by the first half of the 20th century, noting that the square, located at the

intersection of Hanover and High Sts., is now hardly recognizable as such, for the market house, courthouse, and church have encroached on it. But in the early days its limits were clearly defined. The square was the camping ground of Indian delegations in the tense days when the French were invading the Ohio Valley, the gathering place of Revolutionary mass meetings, and the nucleus of a compact little settlement.

The settlement of Carlisle was largely supportive of the Patriot cause during the American Revolution, and numerous individuals from the settlement served in the Revolutionary War. Carlisle contains the home of lawyer James Wilson, who served as a representative to the Continental Congress; Wilson was a signer of the Declaration of Independence in addition to being one of the framers of the U.S. Constitution. The First Presbyterian Church, begun in 1757 and completed in 1770, is the oldest building in Carlisle, and was where the Rev. John Steel (known as "The Fighting Parson") gave sermons in support of the Patriot cause during the American Revolution. The church was also where Pennsylvania settlers met on July 12, 1774, to sign a document protesting the Boston Port Act. A year later Carlisle supplied a contingent for a line infantry regiment of the Continental Army. Steel was named commander of the leading company of this group when they marched from Carlisle. No longer standing but marked by a historical marker is the home of Ephraim Blaine, Commissary General of Revolutionary Army. Also, no longer standing but commemorated, is the home of Gen. John Armstrong Sr., "Hero of Kittanning," Revolutionary officer, and member of the Continental Congress. Still standing is the gun shop of Thomas Butler Sr., an Irish immigrant, who manufactured long rifles during the French and Indian War. He later became Chief Armorer for The First Continental Congress. He and his five sons served in the Revolutionary War and were known as "The Fighting Butlers." His eldest son was Richard Butler (general).

Carlisle also served as a munitions depot during the American Revolutionary War. The depot was later developed into the United States Army War College at Carlisle Barracks. Revolutionary War legend Molly Pitcher died in the borough in 1832, and her body lies buried in the Old Public Graveyard. A hotel was built in her honor, called the Molly Pitcher Hotel; it has since been renovated to house apartments for senior citizens.

Carlisle was incorporated as a borough a few years after the war on April 13, 1782. Carlisle continued to play a part in the early development in the United States through the end of the century: In response to a planned march in favor of the United States Constitution in 1787, Anti-Federalists instigated a riot in Carlisle. A decade later, during the Whiskey Rebellion in 1794, the troops of Pennsylvania and New Jersey assembled in Carlisle under the leadership of President George Washington. While in Carlisle, the president worshiped in the First Presbyterian Church at the corner of Hanover Street and High Street.

Benjamin Rush, a signer of the Declaration of Independence, developed Carlisle Grammar School in 1773 and chartered it as Dickinson College—the first new college founded in the newly recognized United States. One of the college's more famous alumni, the 15th U.S. president, James Buchanan, graduated in 1809. The Dickinson School of Law, founded in 1834 and affiliated then with Dickinson College, ranks as the fifth-oldest law school in the United States and the oldest law school in Pennsylvania.

On June 2, 1847, Carlisle was the site of the McClintock Slave Riot, which that broke out after a fugitive slave hearing at the courthouse; several of the fugitive slaves were able to escape during the fray with the help of Carlisle's black residents, while one of the slave catchers later died of his wounds. A Dickinson College professor, John McClintock, was tried and acquitted for his role in the riot.

A general borough law of 1851 (amended in 1852) authorized a burgess and a borough council to administer the government of the borough of Carlisle.

External videos
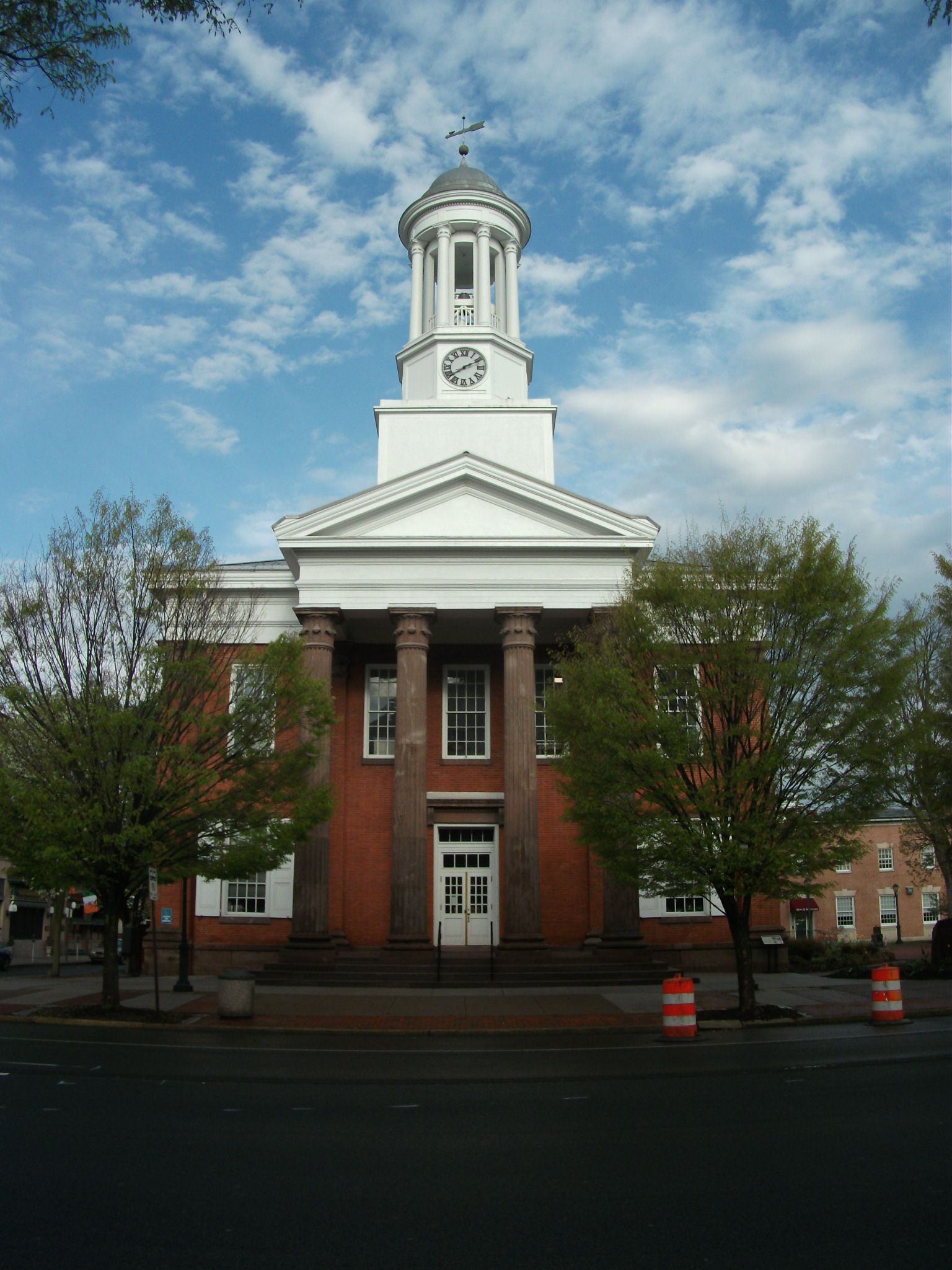
- Cumberland County Courthouse Tour, Cumberland County, Pennsylvania, 29:27

Leading up to the American Civil War, Carlisle served as a stop on the Underground Railroad. During the war, an army of the Confederate States of America, under General Fitzhugh Lee, attacked and shelled the borough during the Battle of Carlisle on July 1, 1863, as part of the Gettysburg campaign. A cannonball dent can still be seen on one of the columns of the historic county courthouse.

United States Army Lieutenant Richard Henry Pratt founded Carlisle Indian Industrial School in 1879 as the first federally supported school for American Indians off a reservation. The United States government maintained the school, housed at Carlisle Barracks as an experiment in educating Native Americans and teaching them to reject tribal culture and to adapt to white society. Pratt retired from the Army in 1903 and from supervising the school as its superintendent in 1904. Athletic hero Jim Thorpe entered the school in 1907 and joined its football team under coach Glenn "Pop" Warner in 1908. Playing halfback, Jim Thorpe led the team to startling upset victories over powerhouses Harvard, Army, and the University of Pennsylvania in 1911–12, bringing nationwide attention to the school. Marianne Moore taught there from 1911 to 1914. Carlisle Indian School closed in 1918.

Dickinson School of Law was chartered as an independent institution in 1890. Dickinson School of Law merged into the Pennsylvania State University in 1997 as Penn State Dickinson School of Law.

Carlisle was the original eastern terminus of the Pennsylvania Turnpike when it opened in October 1940.

The Carlisle Historic District, Carlisle Indian Industrial School, Hessian Powder Magazine, Carlisle Armory, and Old West, Dickinson College are listed on the National Register of Historic Places.

== Geography ==
Carlisle is located slightly northeast of the center of Cumberland County at 40°12′9″N 77°11′42″W (40.202553, −77.195016) at an elevation of 479 feet (146 m). The borough lies in the Cumberland Valley, a section of the Great Appalachian Valley, to the south of Conodoguinet Creek, a tributary of the Susquehanna River. Letort Spring Run, a tributary of Conodoguinet Creek, runs north through the eastern part of the borough.

Carlisle lies in south-central Pennsylvania, southwest of the intersection of Interstate 76 (the Pennsylvania Turnpike) and Interstate 81, roughly 20 miles (32 km) west-southwest of Harrisburg, the state capital. By road, it is approximately 80 mi (130 km) northwest of Baltimore and 124 mi (200 km) west-northwest of Philadelphia. According to the United States Census Bureau, Carlisle has a total area of 5.54 square miles (14.35 km^{2}), of which 5.53 square miles (14.33 km^{2}) is land and 0.01 square miles (0.02 km^{2}), or 0.14%, is water.

=== Climate ===
Carlisle has a humid continental climate (Köppen Dfa) with hot, humid summers and cool winters. The average temperature in Carlisle is 51.3 °F (10.7 °C) with temperatures exceeding 90 °F (32 °C) an average of 16 days a year and dropping below 32 °F (0 °C) an average of 119 days a year. On average, the borough receives 38.8 inches (986 mm) of precipitation annually. Snowfall averages 29.8 inches (757 mm) per year. On average, January is the coolest month, July is the warmest month, and September is the wettest month. The hottest temperature recorded in Carlisle was 102 °F (39 °C) in 1966; the coldest temperature recorded was −19 °F (−28 °C) in 1994.

Climate data for Carlisle, Pennsylvania, 1991–2020 normals, extremes 1873–present
Month	Jan	Feb	Mar	Apr	May	Jun	Jul	Aug	Sep	Oct	Nov	Dec	Year
Record high °F (°C)	68 (20)	82 (28)	83 (28)	93 (34)	94 (34)	100 (38)	103 (39)	100 (38)	96 (36)	92 (33)	78 (26)	68 (20)	103 (39)
Mean daily maximum °F (°C)	38.1 (3.4)	41.0 (5.0)	50.0 (10.0)	62.6 (17.0)	72.5 (22.5)	81.1 (27.3)	85.5 (29.7)	83.8 (28.8)	77.4 (25.2)	65.9 (18.8)	53.5 (11.9)	42.2 (5.7)	62.8 (17.1)
Daily mean °F (°C)	29.3 (−1.5)	31.3 (−0.4)	39.5 (4.2)	50.5 (10.3)	60.7 (15.9)	69.8 (21.0)	74.0 (23.3)	72.3 (22.4)	65.3 (18.5)	53.7 (12.1)	42.9 (6.1)	33.7 (0.9)	51.9 (11.1)
Mean daily minimum °F (°C)	20.5 (−6.4)	21.6 (−5.8)	28.9 (−1.7)	38.5 (3.6)	48.9 (9.4)	58.5 (14.7)	62.5 (16.9)	60.8 (16.0)	53.2 (11.8)	41.5 (5.3)	32.3 (0.2)	25.3 (−3.7)	41.0 (5.0)
Record low °F (°C)	−12 (−24)	−12 (−24)	2 (−17)	22 (−6)	29 (−2)	42 (6)	45 (7)	45 (7)	32 (0)	17 (−8)	8 (−13)	2 (−17)	−12 (−24)
Average precipitation inches (mm)	3.06 (78)	2.58 (66)	4.05 (103)	3.79 (96)	4.73 (120)	4.42 (112)	5.45 (138)	4.03 (102)	4.96 (126)	4.26 (108)	3.13 (80)	3.57 (91)	48.03 (1,220)
Average snowfall inches (cm)	7.7 (20)	9.6 (24)	4.8 (12)	0.2 (0.51)	0.0 (0.0)	0.0 (0.0)	0.0 (0.0)	0.0 (0.0)	0.0 (0.0)	0.5 (1.3)	0.9 (2.3)	4.0 (10)	27.7 (70)
Average precipitation days (≥ 0.01 in)	8.8	9.2	9.4	11.4	14.5	11.8	11.2	11.1	9.0	10.6	7.8	10.3	125.1
Average snowy days (≥ 0.1 in)	3.2	3.2	1.8	0.2	0.0	0.0	0.0	0.0	0.0	0.1	0.3	1.9	10.7
Source 1: NOAA
Source 2: National Weather Service

== Demographics ==
Historical population
Census	Pop.	Note	%±
1800	2,052		—
1810	2,491		21.4%
1820	2,908		16.7%
1830	3,708		27.5%
1840	4,351		17.3%
1850	4,581		5.3%
1860	5,664		23.6%
1870	6,650		17.4%
1880	6,209		−6.6%
1890	7,620		22.7%
1900	9,626		26.3%
1910	10,303		7.0%
1920	10,916		5.9%
1930	12,596		15.4%
1940	13,984		11.0%
1950	16,812		20.2%
1960	16,623		−1.1%
1970	18,079		8.8%
1980	18,314		1.3%
1990	18,419		0.6%
2000	17,970		−2.4%
2010	18,682		4.0%
2020	20,118		7.7%
2024 (est.)	22,517	▲	11.9%
U.S. Decennial Census

=== 2020 census ===
As of the 2020 census, Carlisle had a population of 20,118. The median age was 35.5 years. 19.2% of residents were under the age of 18 and 18.2% of residents were 65 years of age or older. For every 100 females there were 90.3 males, and for every 100 females age 18 and over there were 86.8 males age 18 and over.

100.0% of residents lived in urban areas, while 0.0% lived in rural areas.

There were 8,219 households in Carlisle, of which 24.9% had children under the age of 18 living in them. Of all households, 34.7% were married-couple households, 23.8% were households with a male householder and no spouse or partner present, and 33.1% were households with a female householder and no spouse or partner present. About 39.7% of all households were made up of individuals and 14.7% had someone living alone who was 65 years of age or older.

There were 8,821 housing units, of which 6.8% were vacant. The homeowner vacancy rate was 1.8% and the rental vacancy rate was 4.8%.

Racial composition as of the 2020 census
Race	Number	Percent
White	15,112	75.1%
Black or African American	2,184	10.9%
American Indian and Alaska Native	71	0.4%
Asian	734	3.6%
Native Hawaiian and Other Pacific Islander	11	0.1%
Some other race	533	2.6%
Two or more races	1,473	7.3%
Hispanic or Latino (of any race)	1,453	7.2%

=== 2000 census ===
As of the census of 2000, there were 17,970 people, 7,426 households, and 4,010 families residing in the borough. The population density was 3,308.9 inhabitants per square mile (1,277.6/km^{2}). There were 8,032 housing units at an average density of 1,479.0 per square mile (571.0/km^{2}). The racial makeup of the borough was 88.93% White, 6.92% African American, 0.14% Native American, 1.60% Asian, 0.02% Pacific Islander, 0.71% from other races, and 1.69% from two or more races. Hispanic or Latino of any race were 1.96% of the population.

There were 7,426 households, out of which 23.3% had children under the age of 18 living with them, 40.3% were married couples living together, 10.9% had a female householder with no husband present, and 46.0% were non-families. 39.3% of all households were made up of individuals, and 14.4% had someone living alone who was 65 years of age or older. The average household size was 2.10 and the average family size was 2.81.

In the borough, the population was spread out, with 18.6% under the age of 18, 17.2% from 18 to 24, 25.3% from 25 to 44, 21.1% from 45 to 64, and 17.8% who were 65 years of age or older. The median age was 36 years. For every 100 females, there were 84.2 males. For every 100 females age 18 and over, there were 80.8 males.

The median income for a household in the borough was $33,969, and the median income for a family was $46,588. Males had a median income of $34,519 versus $25,646 for females. The per capita income for the borough was $21,394. About 8.6% of families and 14.0% of the population were below the poverty line, including 21.7% of those under age 18 and 8.5% of those age 65 or over.

== Economy ==
The Giant Company, a regional supermarket chain operating stores in Pennsylvania, Maryland, Virginia and West Virginia under the Giant and Martin's brands is headquartered in Carlisle.

Leading industries in Carlisle's past have included Carlisle Tire and Rubber Company (founded 1917), Masland Carpets (founded 1866), and The Frog, Switch and Manufacturing. Carlisle Tire and Rubber and Masland Carpets have since gone out of business, and both plants were demolished in 2013.

Amazon.com is one of several warehouse facilities in the city. In 2013, Apple opened an AppleCare device repair facility southeast of the Interstate 81 overpass over the Pennsylvania Turnpike to cover American customers east of the Mississippi River.

== Arts and culture ==
Carlisle is famous to many people for its car shows, put on regularly by Carlisle Events throughout the spring, summer, and fall at the Carlisle Fairgrounds. In addition to the regularly scheduled shows there are specialty shows, including the GM Nationals, the Ford Nationals, the Chrysler Nationals, the Truck Nationals, Corvettes at Carlisle, and the Import/Kit Car Nationals.

Partly because of its location at the intersection of two major trucking routes (I-81 and I-76), air pollution within the borough often falls within the range considered by the United States Environmental Protection Agency as "Unhealthy for Sensitive Groups" [i.e., children, the elderly, and people with respiratory or heart disease]. The pollutant typically involved is PM2.5, particulate matter composed of particles less than 2.5 micrometers in diameter.

The Central Pennsylvania Youth Ballet (CPYB), a ballet school and performing company known internationally for their alumni, is based in Carlisle. Students from across the country, and even across the world, come to live with host families to participate in CPYB's rigorous training.

Carlisle's Dickinson College was the site of Washington Redskins preseason training camp from 1963 to 1994 and 2001 to 2002. In 1986, cornerback Darrell Green ran the 40-yard dash in 4.09 seconds. Although the result was unofficial, it is the fastest "legitimate" time ever recorded in the 40-yard dash.

Two privately funded historical markers are located in Carlisle: one for the Hamilton Restaurant's Hot-Chee Dog and another for the Old Town Pump, which provided fresh spring water to Carlisle and "eventually became the source of a legend that claimed anyone who drank from the pump would return to Carlisle no matter how far they roamed".

== Borough Council ==
The Borough Council (Legislative) has up to 7 people in at max. 6 of them are council members and 1 is the Mayor. The members of this group are elected to serve 4-year terms. The council sets the policies, create new taxes and set the utility rates.

The Mayor has a ton of executive power compared to other Pennsylvania boroughs, where the mayor doesn't have a lot of power. As of 2026, the current mayor is Sean Shultz. The Borough Council serves as its president, giving it more influence than a regular mayor.

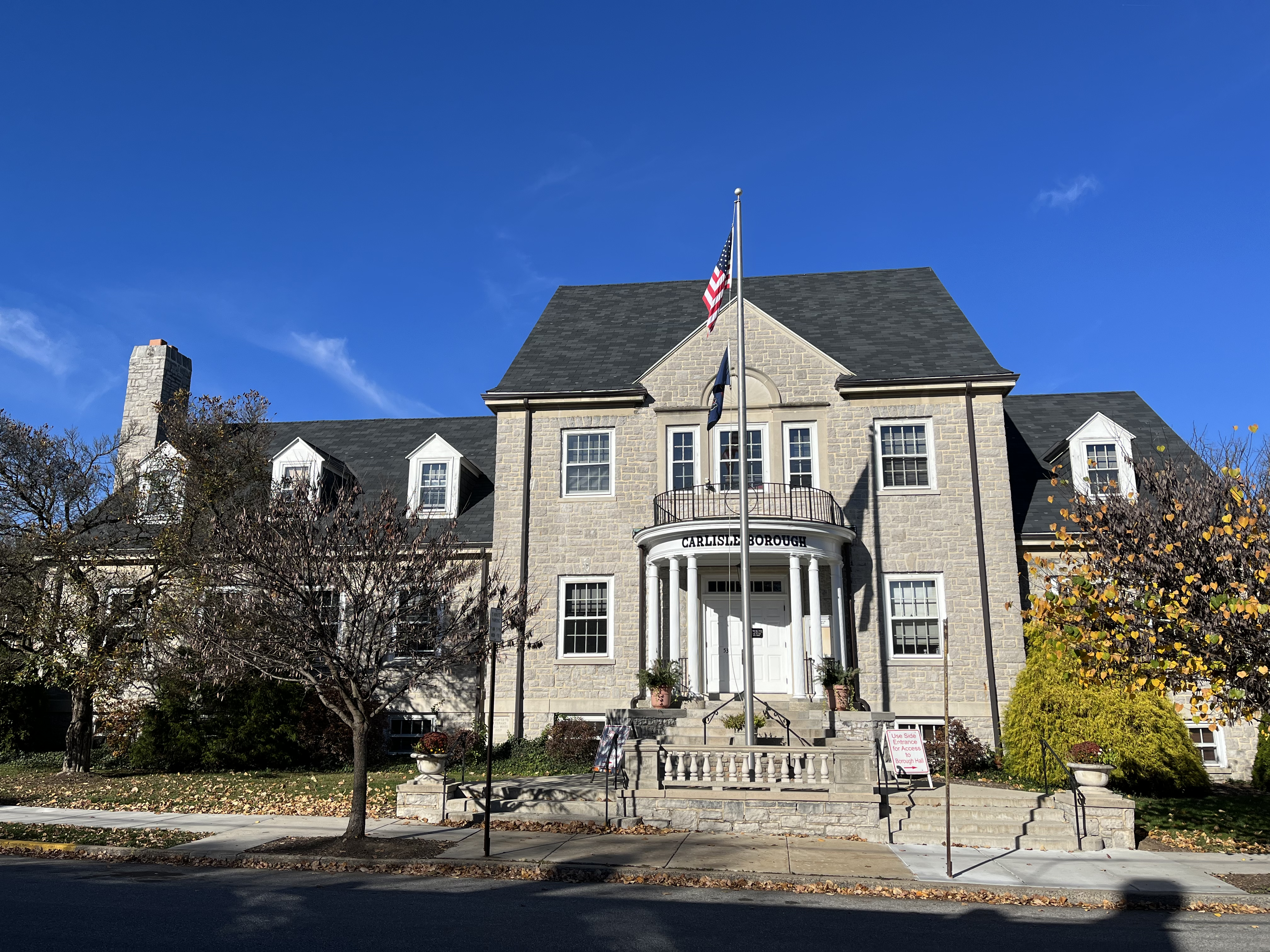
Carlisle Borough Hall

A portion of the Carlisle Barracks property is within Carlisle Borough.

== Education ==
=== Colleges and universities ===
- Dickinson College
- Penn State Dickinson School of Law
- United States Army War College

=== Public schools ===
- Carlisle Area School District

=== Private schools ===
As reported by the National Center for Educational Statistics

- Carlisle Christian Academy
- Blue Ridge Mennonite School
- Dickinson College Children's Center
- Hidden Valley School
- St Patrick School
- The Christian School of Grace Baptist Church

== Media ==
=== Print ===
Carlisle has one daily newspaper, The Sentinel.

=== Radio ===
AM

Frequency	Callsign	Format	City of License	Notes
960	WHYL	Adult Standards	Carlisle, Pennsylvania	-
1000	WIOO	Country	Carlisle, Pennsylvania	-

FM

Frequency	Callsign	Format	City of License	Notes
88.3	WDCV-FM	Variety	Carlisle, Pennsylvania	Dickinson College radio
93.1	W226AS	Contemporary Christian	Carlisle, Pennsylvania	Translator of WBYO, Sellersville, Pennsylvania
97.9	W250AP	Country	Carlisle, Pennsylvania	Translator of WIOO
101.7	W269AS	Christian	Carlisle, Pennsylvania	Family Radio translator
102.3	WCAT-FM	Country	Carlisle, Pennsylvania	Broadcasts from Camp Hill, Pennsylvania

== Notable people ==
- Chief Bender, Major League Baseball Hall of Fame pitcher
- Robert Callender (1726-1776), fur trader and soldier
- Charles J. Albright (1816–1883), congressman from Pennsylvania
- James Armstrong, congressman from Pennsylvania
- John Armstrong Jr., United States Secretary of War
- Upton Birnie Jr. (1877–1957), US Army major general, born in Carlisle
- Deborah Birx, American physician and diplomat.
- Jackson Bostwick, actor
- Ashley Bouder, ballet dancer
- Sid Bream, Major League Baseball player
- Alice Bridges, (1916-2011), Olympic bronze medalist at age 20 in 100 m swimming event (1936 Berlin Olympics); resided in Carlisle
- Nicky Broujos, soccer player
- William Davidson (1783-1867), Pennsylvania State Senator for the 17th district from 1817 to 1824
- Stephen Duncan, the wealthiest cotton planter in the South prior to Civil War, and second largest slave owner in the country
- Cheston Lee Eshelman, inventor, aviator, manufacturer (Cheston L. Eshelman Company) and automaker (see Eshelman)
- John Bannister Gibson (1780-1853), Pennsylvania jurist and state supreme court chief justice
- Harold J. Greene (1955-2014), United States Army soldier
- Arthur Japy Hepburn (1877–1964), admiral whose naval career spanned Spanish–American War, World War I, and World War II
- John Huzvar (1929–2007), football player
- Carrie Imler, ballet dancer
- Alexander J. Irwin, Wisconsin territorial legislator
- Robert Irwin Jr., Michigan territorial legislator
- Pat LaMarche, Homeless advocate, Vice Presidential Candidate 2004
- Jeff Lebo, former men's basketball coach at East Carolina University
- Lois Lowry, author of children's literature, awarded Newbery Medal twice; several childhood years were spent in Carlisle, her mother's hometown
- Robert Macfeely, US Army brigadier general
- Andrew G. Miller, United States federal judge
- Marianne Moore, Modernist poet and writer
- Charles Franklin Moss, photographer and artist
- Billy Owens, former NBA player
- Molly Pitcher (Mary Ludwig Hays McCauley), heroine at the Battle of Monmouth during the American Revolutionary War; a statue of her can be seen in Old Cemetery, where she is buried
- David L. Smith (born 1827), member of the Pennsylvania House of Representatives
- John T. Smith (1801-1864), U.S. Congressman for Pennsylvania's 3rd congressional district from 1843 to 1845
- Samuel Smith, a U.S. senator and congressman from Maryland, born in Carlisle in 1752
- Abi Stafford, ballet dancer
- Jonathan Stafford, ballet dancer and artistic director of New York City Ballet
- Robin Thomas, actor
- Jim Thorpe (1887-1953), iconic athlete, Olympic gold medalist, football player and coach; considered one of the most versatile athletes in modern sports
- Lemuel Todd (1817-1891), U.S. congressman, officer in the 1st Pennsylvania Reserve Regiment
- Frederick Watts, U.S. Commissioner of Agriculture (1871–1876) and "Father of Penn State University"
- Edith Wherry (1876-1961), American novelist
- Samuel Wilkeson, former mayor of Buffalo, New York
- William Wilkins (1779-1865), U.S. Senator 1831–34, U.S. Representative, U.S. Secretary of War
- James Wilson, signer of Declaration of Independence, twice elected to the Continental Congress, a major force in the drafting of the nation's Constitution
- Lee Woodall, former NFL player
- Lt. Col. Jay Zeamer Jr., World War II U.S. Army Air Forces veteran and Medal of Honor recipient
