= David Smith (Tasmania cricketer) =

Australian cricketer (born 1957)

Personal information
- Full name: David Anthony Smith
- Born: 1 September 1957 (age 69); Launceston, Tasmania, Australia
- Batting: Right-handed
- Bowling: Right-arm medium

Domestic team information
- Years: Team
- 1976/77–1983/84: Tasmania
- FC debut: 18 February 1977 Tasmania v South Australia
- Last FC: 25 November 1983 Tasmania v Western Australia
- LA debut: 15 January 1978 Tasmania v South Australia
- Last LA: 21 December 1983 Tasmania v South Australia

Career statistics
Competition	First-class	List A
Matches	29	14
Runs scored	1,117	214
Batting average	21.90	15.28
100s/50s	0/7	0/0
Top score	85	31
Balls bowled	113	28
Wickets	0	1
Bowling average	–	25.00
5 wickets in innings	–	0
10 wickets in match	–	0
Best bowling	–	1/5
Catches/stumpings	5/–	0/–
- Source: CricketArchive, 15 August 2010

David Anthony Smith (born 1 September 1957) was an Australian cricketer who played for the Tasmania. He was a right-handed batting all-rounder, who bowled medium pace. He was born at Launceston, Tasmania and played for the state side between 1977 and 1984.
