= David Smith (Sussex cricketer, born 1962) =

English cricketer (born 1962)

David James Smith (born 28 April 1962) is an English former cricketer active from 1981 to 1984 who played for Sussex. He was born in Brighton. He appeared in fourteen first-class matches as a wicketkeeper and a lefthanded batsman who scored 29 runs with a highest score of 13. He completed 24 catches but no stumpings. He also appeared in 4 John Player League matches scoring 5 not out and completing 1 catch.

He was voted Sussex 2nd XI Player of the Year in 1984 with a top score of 118 against Surrey in July 1984.. Smith also played for Preston Nomads cricket club and is a vice president of the club.
