= David Miln Smith =

American swimmer

Personal information
- Born: October 17, 1938 (age 87) San Francisco, California, United States

Sport
- Sport: Swimming

David Miln Smith (born October 17, 1938) is a speaker and adventure athlete. He was the first man to swim from Africa to Europe across the Strait of Gibraltar, which he did twice, first in 1966, and again in 1967. He made a name for himself in the 1960s and 1970s with a series of extreme and international multi-sports events, such as "Everyman's Olympics" and the "Peace Pentathlon." The latter got him on the cover of Sports Illustrated in 1970, where he was dubbed "Super Hippie." Throughout the next few decades, he wrote books on yoga and health, and was the recurrent guest adventurer on television shows such as Johnny Carson's Tonight Show. Johnny Carson said, “He travels around the world doing all the things you want to do.” The Today Show called him "the King of the Risk Takers".

== Early life ==
David was the son of Dr. Seymour and Gladys Smith of San Francisco, California. He achieved Eagle Scout at the age of 12 and a half, and was at the time the youngest known Eagle Scout.

== Later work ==
From 1973 to 1999 he was on staff at Earth House, a residential treatment center for young people diagnosed with schizophrenia and bipolar disorder in East Millstone, New Jersey, first as a yoga instructor and psychodrama facilitator, and later as the director of their "Earth Adventure" program, an early example of wilderness therapy in which a group of twenty to forty patients would be led on a camping expedition onto the Appalachian Trail, and perform a wilderness course including climbing, rappelling, and canoeing through rapids.

From 1990 to the present, he has been on staff as the motivational speaker for the Northern California Service League, giving talks twice a month to ex-cons in San Quentin, the maximum security prison, San Bruno Jail, San Francisco Jail, and at the center. He urges them to "get a job, not do a job."

He is also on the available-speaker lists of several agencies which arrange speakers for special occasions.

== Published works ==
- HUG THE MONSTER: How to Embrace Your Fears and Live Your Dreams (with Sandra Leicester) (Andrews & McMeel, 1996)
- HEALING JOURNEY The Odyssey of an Uncommon Athlete (Sierra Club Books/Random House, 1983)
- The East/West Exercise Book (McGraw-Hill, 1976)
