= David Smith (footballer, born 1875) =

Scottish footballer

Personal information
- Full name: David Wilson Smith
- Date of birth: 7 July 1875
- Place of birth: Lochgelly, Scotland
- Date of death: 1947 (aged 71–72)
- Position: Wing half

Senior career*
Years	Team	Apps	(Gls)
1891–1893	Lochgelly United		
1893–1894	Cowdenbeath		
1894–1897	Lochgelly United		
1897–1898	Third Lanark		
1898–1899	Chatham		
1899–1900	Millwall Athletic		
1901	Notts County	5	(0)
1901–1905	Middlesbrough	108	(11)
Total		113	(11)
- * Club domestic league appearances and goals

David Wilson Smith (7 July 1875 – 1947) was a Scottish footballer who played in the Football League for Middlesbrough and Notts County.
