= The Indian Medical Gazette =

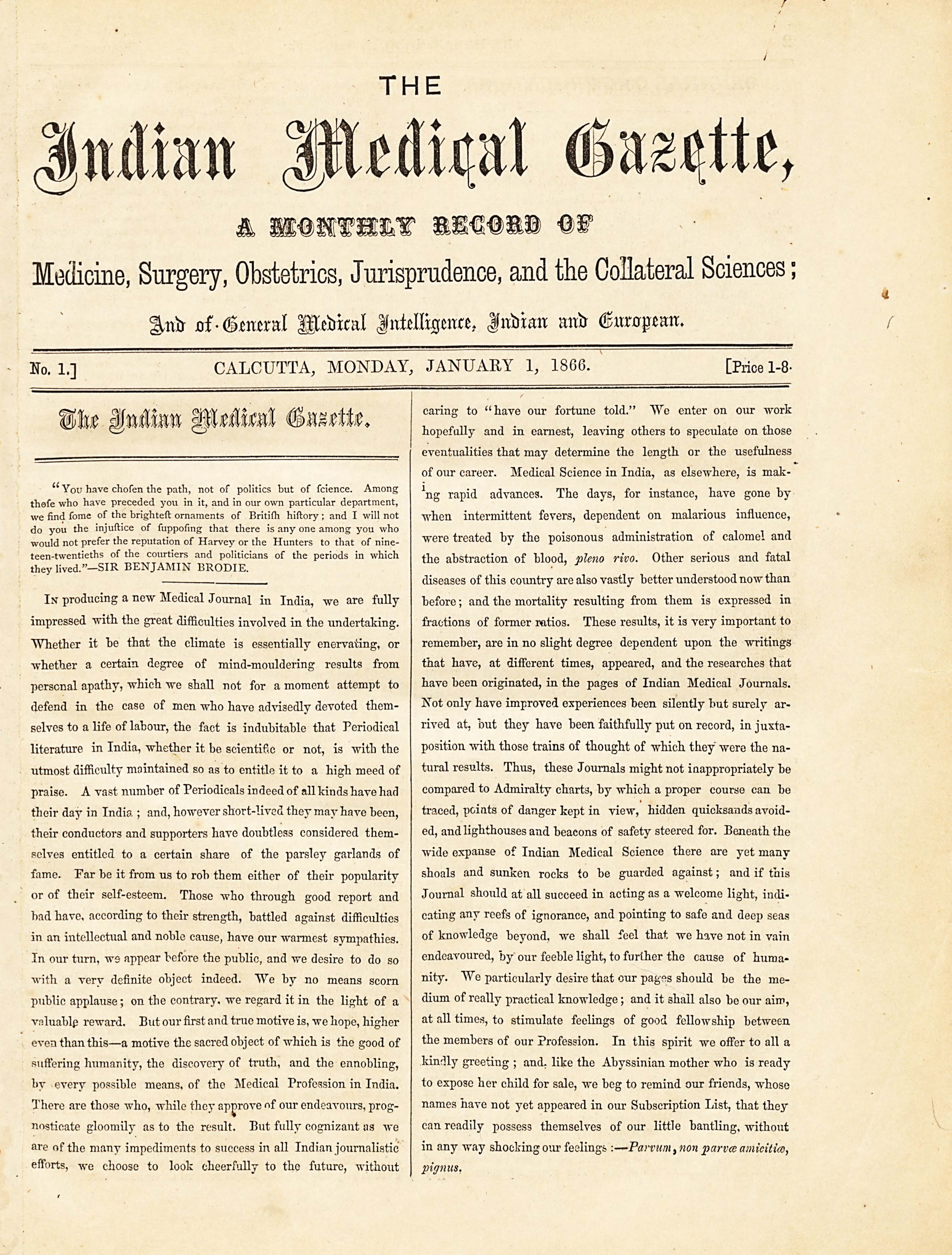
- Cover of the first issue
- Discipline: General medicine
- Language: English

Publication details
- History: 1866–present
- Frequency: Monthly

Standard abbreviations
- ISO 4: Indian Med. Gaz.

Indexing
- CODEN: IMGAAY
- ISSN: 0019-5863
- OCLC no.: 01169166

The Indian Medical Gazette is an Indian medical journal established in 1866. In its early days, it was closely associated with the Indian Medical Service.

== Editors ==
The following is a partial list of the editors:

- David Boyes Smith (1866)
- John Purefoy Colles (1867)
- Charles K. Francis (1868)
- James Tyrell Carter Ross (1869–70)
- Nottidge Charles MacNamara (1871–73)
- Kenneth McLeod (1871–92)
- John Gay French (1875–76)
- Laurence Austine Waddell (1884–85)
- William John Simpson (1889–97)
- Alexander Crombie (1892–93)
