= Dave Smith (triple jumper) =

American triple jumper

Personal information
- Nationality: English
- Born: 15 March 1967 (age 59) Nottingham, England

Sport
- Sport: Athletics
- Event: Triple jump

Oscar David Smith (born November 8, 1947) is an American track and field athlete from Los Angeles, California. He represented the United States in the triple jump at two Olympics, 1968 and 1972. During this period he also ran for the University of California. He was the American Indoor Champion in 1971. He was ranked #2 in the US four times, in 1968, 1970–2. He set his personal best of 17.07 m (56 ft 0 in) in 1972.
