= David B. Smith =

American artist (born 1977)

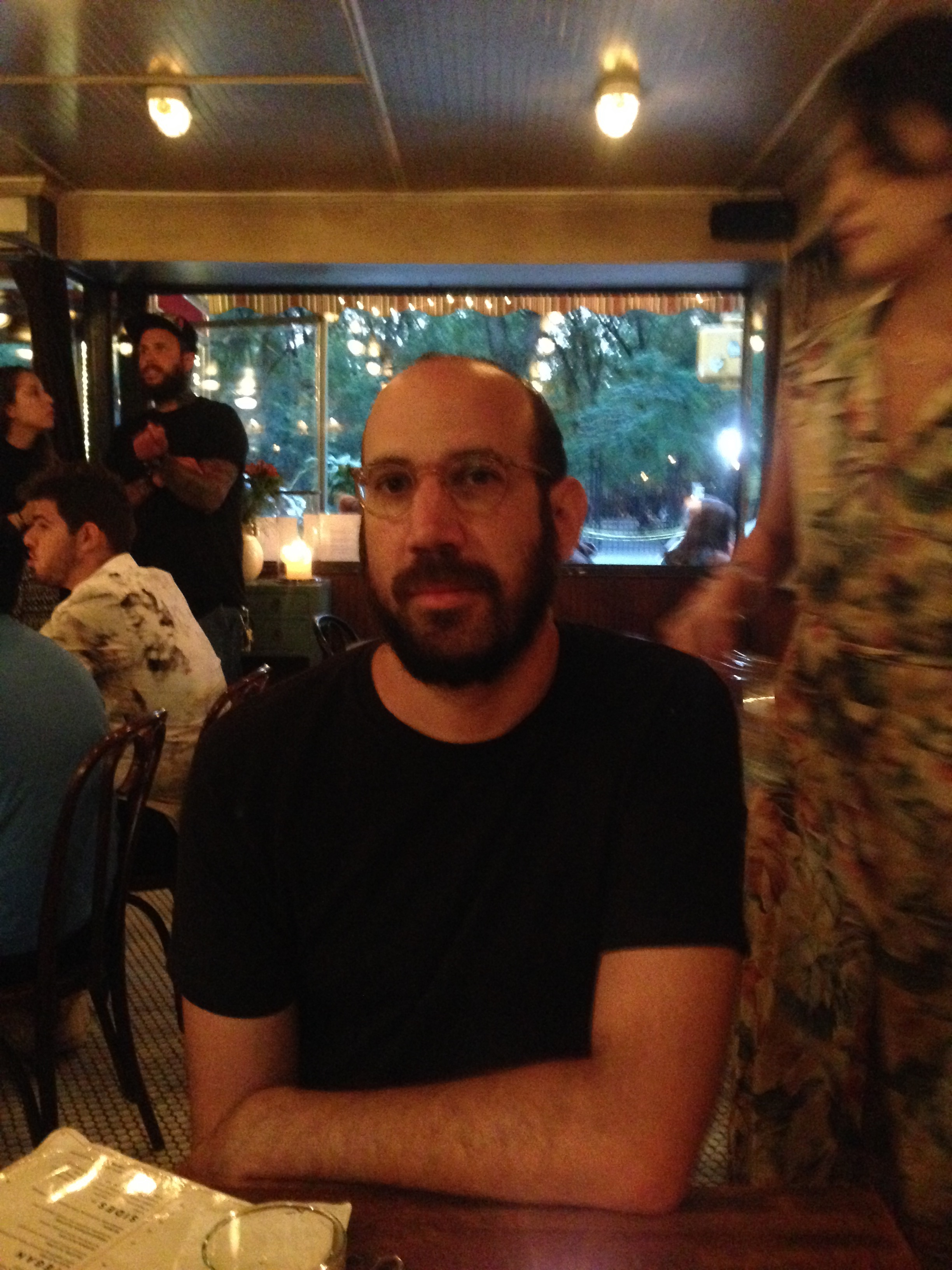
Photo of David B. Smith.

David B. Smith (b. 1977, Washington, D.C.) is a multi-disciplinary artist, who works in fabric-based photo-sculpture, sound and performance. He lives in Brooklyn, NY.

== Early life ==
Born and raised in Washington D.C., Smith attended Oberlin College and graduated with a BA in Art History in 1999. The following year he moved to Chicago, and relocated to New York in 2001. He received an MFA in Photography from Bard College in 2007.

== Career ==
Smith’s work has appeared in exhibitions at MoMa PS1, The International Center of Photography, Asia Song Society, Johannes Vogt Gallery, Essex Flowers, 56 Henry Gallery, The Spring / Break Art Show, and the 2008 Beijing Triennial. He has been a Visiting Artist at Cooper Union, NYU ITP Program and ICP/Bard College, and taught at Pratt Institute and SUNY Old Westbury. In 2019, his work was part of the Textile Biennial at the Rijswijk Museum in the Netherlands. His work has been discussed in The Observer, Art Fag City, VICE, Time Out New York, The Washington Post, and in the New York Times.

== Influences ==
Textiles, soft sculpture and folk art practices influence Smith’s works, and he often blends these forms within a single piece. Speculative fiction and comic book narratives are a lens through which Smith creates, and his works imagine future worlds, creatures, and societies as a way to envision decolonized space and reinvestigate notions of race, climate change and alternate states of consciousness.

Smith writes:

“Sci-fi narratives are very compelling to me - imagining stories and persons, objects and creatures from other planets, VR realities, or star systems. Digital technologies and image gathering help reveal these worlds and continue a line of artistic questioning and layering until I get work that exists in a 3D - an interactive and physically relational element, creating viewer interconnectivity....revealing worlds and selves that might be hidden beneath historical and preconceived notions of what something is to invite the question of what something could be.”

== Creation process ==
For Smith, every object, person or memory is informed by a cultural landscape, made of images, lived experiences, memories, gestures, and sound. He playfully offers the range of possibility within these experiences by bending, folding, and layering textiles with digital, sonic, found, and created images. The resulting works are referential and unfamiliar, creating a discombobulating effect for the viewer, whether a soft sculpture, a sound score or a performance.

== Collections ==
- Peggy Cooper Cafritz
- Beth Rudin DeWoody
- Yale University

== Residencies ==
- Textiles Arts Center, New York, NY, 2019
- Marble House Project, Dorset, VT, 2018
- Socrates Sculpture Park, Queens, NY, 2017
- Franconia Sculpture Park, Shafer, MN, 2016
- Apex Art International Fellow, New Zealand, 2015

== Solo exhibitions ==
- Cloudminders, Geary Contemporary, NY, 2019
- Cave Dwellers, Spring / Break Art Fair, NY, 2019
- Soft Bodies, Halsey McKay Gallery, East Hampton, 2018
- Under the Surface, LMAK Gallery, New York, NY, 2018
- Sampler, Planthouse Gallery, New York, NY, 2018
- The Unseen, Halsey McKay Gallery, NY, NY, 2016
- Extruded Daydream, Spring / Break Art Show, NY, 2016
- Seeing Backwards, Calico Gallery, Brooklyn, NY, 2015

== Group exhibitions ==
- Textile Biennial, Museum Rijswijk, Netherlands, 2019
- Psychedelic Healing Center, Essex Flowers, New York, NY, 2019
- The Socrates Annual, Socrates Sculpture Park, Queens, NY, 2017
- In Search of Lost Time, International Center of Photography, Manhattan, NY, 2017
- Thread by Thread, LMAK Gallery, New York, NY 2017
- Olympia’s Eyes, Zevitas Marcus Gallery, Los Angeles, CA, 2016
- Mi Casa, Tu Casa, Johannes Vogt Gallery, New York, 2016
- reMap 4, Athens, Greece, 2013
- Fuel for the Fire, Zwirner Gallery, New York, NY, 2012
- Fall Collection, MoMa PS1, Queens, New York, 2009
- Waterways, Venice, Italy, 2005

== Art fairs ==
- NADA Miami, Halsey McKay Gallery, 2019
- Dallas Art Fair, Halsey McKay Gallery, 2017
- Art Brussels, Johannes Vogt Gallery, 2016
