= David J. Smith (author) =

American teacher, children's writer and educational consultant

- Born: Boston, Massachusetts
- Occupations: classroom teacher for middle and high school English, geography and social studies; children's author; educational consultant
- Writing career
- Language: English
- Notable work: If the World Were a Village: A Book about the World's People
- Notable awards: 1992 U.S. Department of Education's "A+ for Breaking the Mold" Award for his work
- Website: www.mapping.com/index.shtml

David J. Smith is an American teacher, children's writer and educational consultant.

== Background ==
Smith taught English, geography and social studies for over 25 years.he was born on April 24. He achieved national recognition for his method of teaching seventh graders to draw maps from memory. This approach is explained in his curriculum "Mapping the World by Heart." Since 1992, he has been working as a full-time educational consultant. He lectures on informational technologies, geography and global issues for teachers, parents, students and others through the US, Europe, Africa, Asia and Latin America. Smith was born in Boston, Massachusetts, but now lives in Vancouver, British Columbia.

== Recognition ==
Smith has been recognized by NBC's Today Show, the Los Angeles Times and the Associated Press for the success of his curriculum. He has written articles for The New York Times Education Life section, "The International Educator" and "The World Paper."

== Personal awards ==
In 1992, Smith won the US Department of Education's "A+ for Breaking the Mold" Award for his work.

== Book awards ==
Smith's book If the World Were a Village: A Book About the World's People, illustrated by Shelagh Armstrong, has won a number of awards.

- Premio H.C.Andersen Award in 2003 for the Italian Edition.
- International Reading Association Children's Book Award 2003
- IRA and Children's Book Council Children's Choice Book for 2003
- International Reading Association Teachers' Choice Book
- National Parenting Publications Awards—Gold Award Winner 2003
- Smithsonian Magazine "Notable Book of the Year"

== Books ==
- IF: A Mind-Bending New Way of Looking At Big Ideas and Numbers, Kids Can Press; (September 2014), ISBN 978-1894786348
- If the World Were a Village - Second Edition: A Book about the World's People, Kids Can Press; 2 edition (February 1, 2011), ISBN 978-1554535958
- This Child, Every Child: A Book about the World's Children, Kids Can Press (February 1, 2011) ISBN 978-1554534661
- If America Were a Village: A Book about the People of the United States, Kids Can Press, Ltd.; First edition (August 1, 2009), ISBN 978-1554533442
- If the World Were a Village: A Book about the World's People, CitizenKid, by David J. Smith and Shelagh Armstrong (March 1, 2002), ISBN 978-1550747799
- David Smith's Mapping the World By Heart, Fablevision Learning, Dedham, MA; (July 2010), ISBN 978-1891405655

[* David Smith's Mapping the World by Heart: An Innovative Approach to Learning Geography (textbook grade 5-12), Tom Snyder Productions (1996), ASIN: B0006QW3DU This version no longer in print]
