= List of places in Pennsylvania: D–E =

This list of cities, towns, unincorporated communities, counties, and other recognized places in the U.S. state of Pennsylvania also includes information on the number and names of counties in which the place lies, and its lower and upper zip code bounds, if applicable.

Name of place	Number of counties	Principal county	Lower zip code	Upper zip code
D and M Junction	1	York County		
Daggett	1	Tioga County	16936	
Dagus	1	Elk County	15846	
Dagus Mines	1	Elk County	15831	
Daguscahonda	1	Elk County	15853	
Dahoga	1	Elk County	15870	
Daisytown	1	Cambria County	15902	
Daisytown	1	Washington County	15427	
Dale	1	Berks County	19504	
Dale	1	Cambria County	15902	
Dale	1	Clearfield County		
Dale Summit	1	Centre County	16801	
Daleville	1	Chester County	19330	
Daleville	1	Lackawanna County	18444	
Dalevue	1	Centre County	16801	
Daley	1	Somerset County	15924	
Dallas	1	Luzerne County	18612	
Dallas City	1	McKean County	16701	
Dallas Township	1	Luzerne County		
Dallastown	1	York County	17313	
Dalmatia	1	Northumberland County	17017	
Dalton	1	Lackawanna County	18414	
Damascus	1	Wayne County	18415	
Damascus Township	1	Wayne County		
Danboro	1	Bucks County	18916	
Danielsville	1	Northampton County	18038	
Dannersville	1	Northampton County	18067	
Danville	1	Montour County	17821	
Danville East	1	Montour County	17821	
Darby	1	Delaware County	19023	
Darby Township	1	Delaware County		
Darbytown	1	Wayne County		
Darent	1	Fayette County		
Dark Water	1	Schuylkill County	17970	
Darling	1	Delaware County		
Darlington	1	Beaver County	16115	
Darlington	1	Delaware County	19063	
Darlington	1	Westmoreland County	15658	
Darlington Corners	1	Chester County	19380	
Darlington Township	1	Beaver County		
Darragh	1	Westmoreland County	15625	
Dartmouth Hills	1	Montgomery County	19406	
Dauberville	1	Berks County	19517	
Daugherty Township	1	Beaver County		
Dauphin	1	Dauphin County	17018	
Daves Gap	1	Fulton County		
Davidsburg	1	York County	17315	
Davidson	1	Fayette County	15425	
Davidson Heights	1	Beaver County	15001	
Davidson Township	1	Sullivan County		
Davidsville	1	Somerset County	15928	
Davis	1	Indiana County		
Davis	1	McKean County		
Davis Grove	1	Montgomery County	19044	
Davistown	1	Fayette County		
Davistown	1	Greene County	15349	
Davisville	1	Bucks County	18966	
Dawson	1	Fayette County	15428	
Dawson Manor	1	Montgomery County	19040	
Dawson Ridge	1	Beaver County	15009	
Dawson Run	1	Forest County		
Day	1	Clarion County	16258	
Daylesford	1	Chester County	19312	
Dayton	1	Armstrong County	16222	
Dayton	1	Dauphin County	17098	
De Lancey	1	Jefferson County	15733	
De Turksville	1	Schuylkill County	17963	
De Young	1	Elk County	16728	
Deal	1	Somerset County	15552	
Dean	1	Cambria County	16636	
Dean Township	1	Cambria County		
Deanville	1	Armstrong County	16242	
Deardorffs Mill	1	Adams County		
Dearth	1	Fayette County	15401	
Decatur Township	1	Clearfield County		
Decatur Township	1	Mifflin County		
Deckard	1	Crawford County	16314	
Deckers Point	1	Indiana County	15759	
Deckertown	1	Susquehanna County		
Dee	1	Armstrong County		
Deegan	1	Butler County		
Deemers Cross Roads	1	Jefferson County	15851	
Deemston	1	Washington County	15333	
Deep Dale East	1	Bucks County		
Deep Dale West	1	Bucks County		
Deep Run	1	Bucks County	18944	
Deep Valley	1	Greene County	15352	
Deer Creek Township	1	Mercer County		
Deer Lake	1	Fayette County	15421	
Deer Lake	1	Schuylkill County	17961	
Deer Lick	1	Greene County		
Deer Park	1	Bucks County	18938	
Deercroft	1	Montgomery County	19444	
Deerfield Township	1	Tioga County		
Deerfield Township	1	Warren County		
Defense Depot, Mechanicsburg	1	Cumberland County	17055	
Defense Personnel Support Center	1	Philadelphia County	19101	
Deffenbaugh	1	Fayette County		
Defiance	1	Bedford County	16633	
Degolia	1	McKean County	16701	
DeHaven	1	Clarion County		
Deibler	1	Northumberland County	17821	
Delabole	1	Northampton County	18072	
Delamater Corners	1	Crawford County		
Delano	1	Schuylkill County	18220	
Delano Township	1	Schuylkill County		
Delaware	1	Pike County		
Delaware Grove	1	Mercer County	16124	
Delaware National Scenic River	2		18324	
Delaware Run	1	Northumberland County	17777	
Delaware Township	1	Juniata County		
Delaware Township	1	Mercer County		
Delaware Township	1	Northumberland County		
Delaware Township	1	Pike County		
Delaware Valley College	1	Bucks County		
Delaware Water Gap	1	Monroe County	18327	
Delaware Water Gap National Recreation Area	3		18324	
Delhill Corners	1	Erie County		
Dellville	1	Perry County	17020	
Dellwood	1	Jefferson County		
Delmar Township	1	Tioga County		
Delmont	1	Westmoreland County	15626	
Delphene	1	Greene County		
Delphi	1	Montgomery County	19473	
Delps	1	Northampton County	18038	
Delroy	1	York County	17406	
Delta	1	York County	17314	
Delta Manor	1	Northampton County	18017	
Demmler	1	Allegheny County	15137	
Dempseytown	1	Venango County	16323	
Demunds Corners	1	Luzerne County		
Denbeau Heights	1	Washington County	15417	
Denbo	1	Washington County	15429	
Denholm	1	Juniata County	17059	
Denison	1	Westmoreland County		
Dennis Mills	1	Columbia County		
Dennison Township	1	Luzerne County		
Dennys Corners	1	Crawford County		
Dennys Mill	1	Butler County	16023	
Denton	1	Indiana County		
Denton Hill	1	Potter County		
Dents Run	1	Elk County	15832	
Denver	1	Lancaster County	17517	
Deodate	1	Dauphin County	17022	
Deringer	1	Luzerne County	18241	
Derk	1	Columbia County		
Derrick City	1	McKean County	16727	
Derringer	1	Luzerne County		
Derringer Corners	1	Lawrence County		
Derrs	1	Columbia County	17814	
Derry	1	Columbia County		
Derry	1	Westmoreland County	15627	
Derry Township	1	Dauphin County		
Derry Township	1	Mifflin County		
Derry Township	1	Montour County		
Derry Township	1	Westmoreland County		
Derstines	1	Bucks County		
Derwood Park	1	Delaware County	19094	
Derwyn	1	Montgomery County	19004	
De Sale	1	Butler County		
Desire	1	Jefferson County	15851	
Detters Mill	1	York County		
Devault	1	Chester County	19432	
Devon	1	Chester County	19333	
Dewart	1	Northumberland County	17730	
Dewey Heights	1	Lehigh County	18052	
Dexter	1	Tioga County		
Diamond	1	Clarion County		
Diamond	1	Venango County	16354	
Diamondtown	1	Northumberland County	17851	
Diamondville	1	Indiana County	15728	
Dias	1	Indiana County		
Dice	1	Union County	17844	
Dick	1	Westmoreland County		
Dickerson Run	1	Fayette County	15430	
Dickey	1	Armstrong County		
Dickey	1	Franklin County	17236	
Dickeys Mountain	1	Fulton County		
Dickinson	1	Cumberland County	17218	
Dickinson Township	1	Cumberland County		
Dickson City	1	Lackawanna County	18519	
Dicksonburg	1	Crawford County	16406	
Diebertsville	1	Lehigh County		
Dieffenbach	1	Montour County		
Diehl	1	Bedford County		
Diehltown	1	Clearfield County		
Dietrich	1	Dauphin County		
Dilliner	1	Greene County	15327	
Dillinger	1	Lehigh County	18049	
Dillingersville	1	Lehigh County	18092	
Dillontown	1	Wayne County	18417	
Dillsburg	1	York County	17019	
Dillsburg Junction	1	Cumberland County	17055	
Dilltown	1	Indiana County	15929	
Dilworthtown	1	Chester County	19380	
Dime	1	Armstrong County	15690	
Dimeling	1	Clearfield County	16830	
Dimmsville	1	Juniata County		
Dimock	1	Susquehanna County	18816	
Dimock Township	1	Susquehanna County		
Dingman Township	1	Pike County		
Dingmans Ferry	1	Pike County	18328	
Dinsmore	1	Washington County		
Dippel Manor	1	Luzerne County	18201	
Distant	1	Armstrong County	16223	
District Township	1	Berks County		
Divener	1	Butler County		
Divide	1	Columbia County		
Dividing Ridge	1	Somerset County	15530	
Dixmont	1	Allegheny County	15143	
Dixon	1	Wyoming County		
Dixonville	1	Indiana County	15734	
Doane	1	Tioga County		
Dock Hollow	1	Armstrong County		
Dock Junction	1	Erie County		
Doe Run	1	Chester County	19320	
Dog Town	1	Armstrong County	16226	
Dogtown	1	Columbia County	17815	
Dogtown	1	Fulton County		
Dogtown	1	Lebanon County		
Dogtown	1	Luzerne County	18655	
Dogtown	1	Snyder County	17870	
Dogtown	1	Tioga County		
Dogwood Acres	1	Bucks County	18966	
Dogwood Hollow	1	Bucks County		
Dolf	1	York County		
Dolington	1	Bucks County	18940	
Dombach Manor	1	Lancaster County	17601	
Donaghmore	1	Lebanon County	17042	
Donaldson	1	Schuylkill County	17981	
Donaldson	1	Warren County		
Donaldsons Crossroads	1	Washington County	15317	
Donation	1	Huntingdon County	16652	
Donegal	1	Westmoreland County	15628	
Donegal Heights	1	Lancaster County	17552	
Donegal Springs	1	Lancaster County	17552	
Donegal Township	1	Butler County		
Donegal Township	1	Washington County		
Donegal Township	1	Westmoreland County		
Donerville	1	Lancaster County	17603	
Donley	1	Washington County		
Donnally Mills	1	Perry County	17062	
Donnelly	1	Westmoreland County		
Donnellytown	1	Cumberland County	17013	
Donner Crossroads	1	Mercer County		
Donohoe	1	Westmoreland County	15650	
Donora	1	Washington County	15033	
Donsfort	1	Washington County		
Dooleyville	1	Northumberland County	17851	
Dora	1	Greene County	15338	
Dora	1	Jefferson County	15767	
Doris	1	Cambria County	15906	
Dorlan	1	Chester County		
Dormont	1	Allegheny County	15216	
Dorneyville	1	Lehigh County	18104	
Dornsife	1	Northumberland County	17823	
Dorothy	1	Westmoreland County	15650	
Dorrance	1	Luzerne County	18707	
Dorrance Township	1	Luzerne County		
Dorset	1	Schuylkill County	17960	
Dorseyville	1	Allegheny County	15238	
Dott	1	Fulton County	17267	
Dotter	1	Venango County		
Dotters Corners	1	Monroe County	18058	
Doty Roundtop	1	Indiana County		
Dotyville	1	Warren County		
Doubling Gap	1	Cumberland County	17241	
Dougherty	1	Cambria County		
Doughertys Mills	1	Butler County		
Douglass	1	Allegheny County		
Douglass Township	1	Berks County		
Douglass Township	1	Montgomery County		
Douglassville	1	Berks County	19518	
Doutyville	1	Northumberland County	17872	
Dover	1	York County	17315	
Dover Township	1	York County		
Dowler Junction	1	Clearfield County		
Dowlin	1	Chester County		
Down East	1	Chester County	19355	
Downey	1	Somerset County	15530	
Downieville	1	Butler County	16059	
Downing Hills	1	Chester County	19335	
Downingtown	1	Chester County	19335	
Downtown	1	Erie County	16501	
Downtown	1	Fayette County	15401	
Downtown	1	Lancaster County	17603	
Downtown	1	Lawrence County	16101	
Doyles Mills	1	Juniata County	17058	
Doylesburg	1	Franklin County	17219	
Doylestown	1	Bucks County	18901	
Doylestown	1	Franklin County		
Doylestown Township	1	Bucks County		
Drab	1	Blair County		
Draco	1	York County		
Drake	2	Lawrence County	16156	
Drake	2	Mercer County	16156	
Drakes Creek	1	Carbon County		
Drakes Mills	1	Crawford County	16403	
Draketown	1	Clinton County		
Draketown	1	Erie County		
Draketown	1	Somerset County	15424	
Drane	1	Clearfield County	16666	
Draper	1	Tioga County	16901	
Drauckers	1	Clearfield County	15848	
Dravosburg	1	Allegheny County	15034	
Dreher Township	1	Wayne County		
Drehersville	1	Schuylkill County	17961	
Dreibelbis	1	Berks County		
Drennen	1	Westmoreland County	15068	
Dresher	1	Montgomery County	19025	
Drexel Heights	1	Northampton County	18067	
Drexel Hill	1	Delaware County	19026	
Drexel Hills	1	Cumberland County	17070	
Drexel Manor	1	Delaware County	19026	
Drexel Park	1	Delaware County	19026	
Drexel Plaza	1	Delaware County	19050	
Drexelbrook	1	Delaware County	19026	
Drifting	1	Clearfield County	16834	
Drifton	1	Luzerne County	18221	
Driftwood	1	Cameron County	15832	
Drinker	1	Lackawanna County	18444	
Driscoll	1	Cambria County		
Drocton	1	Clinton County	17764	
Dromgold	1	Perry County		
Druid Hills	1	Luzerne County	18612	
Drummond	1	Elk County	15823	
Drumore	1	Lancaster County	17518	
Drumore Center	1	Lancaster County		
Drumore Township	1	Lancaster County		
Drums	1	Luzerne County	18222	
Drury	1	Clinton County		
Drury Run	1	Clinton County	17764	
Dry Hill	1	Fayette County	15425	
Dry Run	1	Franklin County	17220	
Dry Tavern	1	Carbon County		
Dry Tavern	1	Greene County	15357	
Dry Top	1	Centre County		
Dry Valley Crossroads	1	Union County	17889	
Drytown	1	Lancaster County		
Dryville	1	Berks County	19539	
Dublin	1	Bucks County	18917	
Dublin Mills	1	Fulton County	17229	
Dublin Township	1	Fulton County		
Dublin Township	1	Huntingdon County		
DuBois	1	Clearfield County	15801	
Duboistown	1	Lycoming County	17701	
Duckrun	1	Lawrence County		
Dudley	1	Huntingdon County	16634	
Duff City	1	Allegheny County	15143	
Duffield	1	Franklin County	17201	
Duffs	1	Allegheny County		
Duffs Junction	1	Allegheny County		
Dugan Hill	1	Fayette County		
Duhring	1	Forest County	16239	
Duke Center	1	McKean County	16729	
Dumas	1	Somerset County		
Dumb Hundred	1	Blair County	16673	
Dunbar	1	Fayette County	15431	
Dunbar Township	1	Fayette County		
Duncan Township	1	Tioga County		
Duncannon	1	Perry County	17020	
Duncansville	1	Blair County	16635	
Duncott	1	Schuylkill County	17901	
Dundaff	1	Susquehanna County	18407	
Dundore	1	Snyder County	17864	
Dungarvin	1	Huntingdon County	16877	
Dunkard	1	Greene County	15327	
Dunkard Township	1	Greene County		
Dunkelbergers	1	Northumberland County	17872	
Dunkle	1	Washington County		
Dunlap	1	Bucks County		
Dunlap Creek Junction	1	Fayette County	15417	
Dunlap Creek Village	1	Fayette County	15475	
Dunlevy	1	Washington County	15432	
Dunlo	1	Cambria County	15930	
Dunminning	1	Delaware County	19073	
Dunmore	1	Lackawanna County	18512	
Dunn	1	Washington County	15329	
Dunning	1	Bradford County		
Dunnings Creek Junction	1	Bedford County		
Dunningsville	1	Washington County	15330	
Dunningtown	1	Westmoreland County	15632	
Dunns Eddy	1	Warren County	16371	
Dunns Station	1	Washington County		
Dunnstable Township	1	Clinton County		
Dunnstown	1	Clinton County	17745	
Dunring	1	Forest County		
Dupont	1	Luzerne County	18641	
Duquesne	1	Allegheny County	15110	
Duquesne Heights	1	Allegheny County		
Duquesne Wharf	1	Allegheny County	15110	
Durbin	1	Greene County	15380	
Durell	1	Bradford County		
Durham	1	Bucks County	18039	
Durham Township	1	Bucks County		
Durham Furnace	1	Bucks County	18039	
Durham Furnace-Durham Mill	1	Bucks County		
Durlach	1	Lancaster County	17522	
Durrell	1	Bradford County	18848	
Durward	1	Potter County		
Duryea	1	Luzerne County	18642	
Duryea Junction	1	Luzerne County	18642	
Dushore	1	Sullivan County	18614	
Dutch Hill	1	Clarion County	16049	
Dutch Hill	1	Fayette County	15450	
Dutch Hill	1	Mercer County		
Dutch Settlement	1	Cambria County	15946	
Dutchtown	1	Franklin County	17236	
Dutton Mill	1	Chester County	19380	
Dyberry	1	Wayne County		
Dyberry Township	1	Wayne County		
Dyerstown	1	Bucks County	18901	
Dykeman Spring	1	Cumberland County		
Dysart	1	Cambria County	16636	
Dysertown	1	Cambria County		
Eagle	1	Chester County		
Eagle Farms	1	Delaware County	19083	
Eagle Foundry	1	Huntingdon County	16621	
Eagle Heights	1	Delaware County	19083	
Eagle Point	1	Berks County		
Eagle Point	1	Lehigh County		
Eagle Rock	1	Venango County	16301	
Eaglehurst	1	Erie County	16509	
Eagles Mere	1	Sullivan County	17731	
Eagles Mere Park	1	Sullivan County	17731	
Eagleton Fields	1	Clinton County		
Eagleville	1	Centre County	16826	
Eagleville	1	Montgomery County	19408	
Earl Township	1	Berks County		
Earl Township	1	Lancaster County		
Earlington	1	Montgomery County	18918	
Earlston	1	Bedford County	15537	
Earlville	1	Berks County	19519	
Earlyville	1	Elk County		
Earnest	1	Montgomery County		
Earnestville	1	Centre County	16666	
East Allen Township	1	Northampton County		
East Allentown	1	Lehigh County		
East Altoona	1	Blair County	16601	
East Ararat	1	Susquehanna County	18465	
East Athens	1	Bradford County	18810	
East Bangor	1	Northampton County	18013	
East Beech	1	Clinton County		
East Benton	1	Lackawanna County	18414	
East Berlin	1	Adams County	17316	
East Berlin	1	Wayne County		
East Berwick	1	Luzerne County	18603	
East Bethlehem Township	1	Washington County		
East Bloomsburg	1	Columbia County		
East Bradford	1	McKean County	16701	
East Bradford Township	1	Chester County		
East Brady	1	Clarion County	16028	
East Branch	1	Jefferson County		
East Branch	1	Warren County	16434	
East Brandywine Township	1	Chester County		
East Brunswick Township	1	Schuylkill County		
East Buffalo	1	Washington County	15301	
East Buffalo Township	1	Union County		
East Butler	1	Butler County	16029	
East California	1	Fayette County		
East Caln Township	1	Chester County		
East Cameron Township	1	Northumberland County		
East Canton	1	Bradford County	17724	
East Carnegie	1	Allegheny County		
East Carroll Township	1	Cambria County		
East Charleroi	1	Westmoreland County		
East Charleston	1	Tioga County	16933	
East Chillisquaque Township	1	Northumberland County		
East Cocalico Township	1	Lancaster County		
East Conemaugh	1	Cambria County	15909	
East Connellsville	1	Fayette County	15425	
East Coventry Township	1	Chester County		
East Deer Township	1	Allegheny County		
East Donegal Township	1	Lancaster County		
East Drumore Township	1	Lancaster County		
East Du Bois	1	Clearfield County	15801	
East Du Bois Junction	1	Clearfield County	15801	
East Earl	1	Lancaster County	17519	
East Earl Township	1	Lancaster County		
East End	1	Blair County		
East End	1	Centre County		
East End	1	Clearfield County	16830	
East End	1	Luzerne County	18702	
East Fairfield Township	1	Crawford County		
East Fallowfield Township	1	Chester County		
East Fallowfield Township	1	Crawford County		
East Falls	1	Philadelphia County	19129	
East Faxon	1	Lycoming County	17706	
East Fayetteville	1	Franklin County		
East Ferney	1	Clinton County		
East Finley	1	Washington County	15377	
East Finley Township	1	Washington County		
East Fogelsville	1	Lehigh County	18090	
East Fork	1	Potter County		
East Franklin Township	1	Armstrong County		
East Fredricktown	1	Fayette County	15450	
East Freedom	1	Blair County	16637	
East Germantown	1	Philadelphia County	19138	
East Goshen Township	1	Chester County		
East Greenville	1	Montgomery County	18041	
East Hanover	1	Lebanon County	17003	
East Hanover Township	1	Dauphin County		
East Hanover Township	1	Lebanon County		
East Hempfield Township	1	Lancaster County		
East Herrick	1	Bradford County	18845	
East Hickory	1	Forest County	16321	
East Hill	1	Lycoming County		
East Hills	1	Cambria County	15901	
East Hills	1	Northampton County		
East Honesdale	1	Wayne County	18431	
East Hopewell Township	1	York County		
East Huntingdon Township	1	Westmoreland County		
East Jermyn	1	Lackawanna County	18433	
East Kane	1	McKean County	16735	
East Keating Township	1	Clinton County		
East Kittanning	1	Armstrong County		
East Lackawannock Township	1	Mercer County		
East Lampeter Township	1	Lancaster County		
East Lansdowne	1	Delaware County	19050	
East Lawn	1	Northampton County	18064	
East Lawrence	1	Tioga County		
East Lawrenceville	1	Tioga County	16929	
East Lemon	1	Wyoming County	18657	
East Lenox	1	Susquehanna County	18470	
East Lewisburg	1	Northumberland County	17847	
East Liberty	1	Allegheny County	15206	
East Lynn	1	Susquehanna County		
East McKeesport	1	Allegheny County	15035	
East Mahanoy Junction	1	Schuylkill County	18214	
East Mahoning Township	1	Indiana County		
East Manchester Township	1	York County		
East Marianna	1	Washington County	15345	
East Marianna-West Zollarsville	1	Washington County		
East Marlborough Township	1	Chester County		
East Mauch Chunk	1	Carbon County		
East Mead Township	1	Crawford County		
East Millsboro	1	Fayette County	15433	
East Mines	1	Schuylkill County	17970	
East Monongahela	1	Allegheny County	15063	
East Moravia	1	Lawrence County		
East Muncy	1	Lycoming County	17756	
East Nantmeal Township	1	Chester County		
East New Castle	1	Lawrence County	16101	
East Newport	1	Perry County	17074	
East Norriton Township	1	Montgomery County		
East Norwegian Township	1	Schuylkill County		
East Nottingham Township	1	Chester County		
East Oakmont	1	Allegheny County	15131	
East Oreland	1	Montgomery County	19075	
East Penn Township	1	Carbon County		
East Penn Junction	1	Lehigh County		
East Pennsboro Township	1	Cumberland County		
East Petersburg	1	Lancaster County	17520	
East Pike Run Township	1	Washington County		
East Pikeland Township	1	Chester County		
East Pittsburgh	1	Allegheny County	15112	
East Prospect	1	York County	17317	
East Providence Township	1	Bedford County		
East Riverside	1	Fayette County	15410	
East Rochester	1	Beaver County	15074	
East Rockhill Township	1	Bucks County		
East Roscoe	1	Fayette County		
East Run	1	Indiana County	15759	
East Rush	1	Susquehanna County	18844	
East Saint Clair Township	1	Bedford County		
East Salem	1	Juniata County	17059	
East Sandy	1	Venango County		
East Saxton	1	Bedford County		
East Shamburg	1	Venango County		
East Sharon	1	Potter County		
East Sharpsburg	1	Blair County	16673	
East Side	1	Carbon County	18661	
East Side	1	Philadelphia County		
East Smethport	1	McKean County	16730	
East Smithfield	1	Bradford County	18817	
East Springfield	1	Erie County	16411	
East Sterling	1	Wayne County		
East Stroudsburg	1	Monroe County	18301	
East Sunbury	1	Northumberland County		
East Swiftwater	1	Monroe County	18370	
East Taylor Township	1	Cambria County		
East Texas	1	Lehigh County	18046	
East Titusville	1	Crawford County	16354	
East Towanda	1	Bradford County	18848	
East Towne Mall	1	Lancaster County	17602	
East Troy	1	Bradford County	16947	
East Union Township	1	Schuylkill County		
East Uniontown	1	Fayette County	15401	
East Vandergrift	1	Westmoreland County	15629	
East View	1	Greene County	15370	
East Vincent Township	1	Chester County		
East Washington	1	Washington County	15301	
East Waterford	1	Juniata County	17021	
East Wayne	1	Crawford County		
East Weissport	1	Carbon County	18235	
East Wheatfield Township	1	Indiana County		
East Whiteland Township	1	Chester County		
East William Penn	1	Schuylkill County	17975	
East Yoe	1	York County	17356	
East York	1	York County	17402	
Eastbrook	1	Lawrence County	16101	
Eastland	1	Lancaster County	19362	
Eastland Hills	1	Franklin County	17268	
Eastland Hills	1	Lancaster County	17602	
Eastlawn Gardens	1	Northampton County	18064	
Eastmont	1	Allegheny County	15235	
Eastmont	1	Cambria County	15902	
Eastmont	1	York County	17315	
Easton	1	Clarion County	16255	
Easton	1	Northampton County	18042	
Easton Anglers	1	Monroe County		
Eastpoint	1	Tioga County	17765	
Easttown Township	1	Chester County		
Easttown Woods	1	Chester County	19312	
Eastvale	1	Beaver County	15010	
Eastville	1	Clinton County	17747	
Eastvue	1	Allegheny County	15235	
Eastwick	1	Philadelphia County		
Eastwood	1	Allegheny County	15235	
Eastwood	1	Westmoreland County	15601	
Eaton Township	1	Wyoming County		
Eatonville	1	Wyoming County	18657	
Eau Claire	1	Butler County	16030	
Ebenezer	1	Dauphin County		
Ebenezer	1	Lebanon County	17042	
Ebensburg	1	Cambria County	15931	
Ebensburg Junction	1	Cambria County		
Eberhardt	1	Allegheny County	15101	
Eberhardt	1	Butler County	16001	
Eberlys Mill	1	Cumberland County	17011	
Ebervale	1	Luzerne County	18223	
Echo	1	Armstrong County	16222	
Echo	1	Cambria County	15942	
Echo Lake	1	Monroe County	18301	
Echo Reach	1	Bucks County		
Echo Valley	1	Delaware County	19073	
Echo Valley	1	Schuylkill County	17981	
Eckenrode Mill	1	Cambria County	16668	
Eckert	1	Lehigh County	18104	
Eckley	1	Luzerne County	18255	
Eckville	1	Berks County	19529	
Economy	1	Beaver County	15003	15005
Eddington	1	Bucks County	19020	
Eddystone	1	Delaware County	19022	
Eddyville	1	Armstrong County	16242	
Ededburg	1	Berks County		
Edella	1	Lackawanna County		
Edelman	1	Northampton County	18064	
Eden	1	Clearfield County		
Eden	1	Lancaster County	17601	
Eden Croft	1	Montgomery County	19006	
Eden Heights	1	Lancaster County	17601	
Eden Park	1	Allegheny County		
Eden Township	1	Lancaster County		
Edenborn	1	Fayette County	15458	
Edenburg	1	Berks County	19526	
Edenburg	1	Clarion County		
Edendale	1	Centre County	16666	
Edenton	1	Chester County		
Edenville	1	Franklin County	17201	
Edgar Allan Poe National Historic Site	1	Philadelphia County	19106	
Edge Hill	1	Montgomery County	19038	
Edgeboro	1	Bucks County		
Edgebrook	1	Allegheny County		
Edgecliff	1	Westmoreland County	15068	
Edgegrove	1	Adams County	17331	
Edgely	1	Bucks County	19007	
Edgemere	1	Pike County		
Edgemont	1	Dauphin County	17109	
Edgemont	1	Delaware County	19028	
Edgemont	1	Northampton County	18088	
Edgemont Farms	1	Chester County	19073	
Edgemont Park	1	Delaware County		
Edges Mill	1	Chester County	19335	
Edgewater	1	Allegheny County	15139	
Edgewater Park	1	Bucks County	19067	
Edgewater Terrace	1	Westmoreland County	15650	
Edgewood	1	Allegheny County	15218	
Edgewood	1	Indiana County		
Edgewood	1	Luzerne County		
Edgewood	1	Northumberland County	17872	
Edgewood	1	Somerset County	15501	
Edgewood Acres	1	Allegheny County	15221	
Edgewood Grove	1	Somerset County	15501	
Edgewood Park	1	Bucks County	19067	
Edgewood Park	1	Delaware County	19008	
Edgeworth	1	Allegheny County	15143	
Edgmont	1	Delaware County	19028	
Edgmont Township	1	Delaware County		
Edie	1	Somerset County	15501	
Edinboro	1	Erie County	16412	
Edinburg	1	Lawrence County	16116	
Edison	1	Bucks County	18901	
Edisonville	1	Lancaster County	17579	
Edisonville	1	Lebanon County		
Edmon	1	Armstrong County	15630	
Edna	1	Westmoreland County	15611	
Edna Mine Number 2	1	Westmoreland County		
Edwardsville	1	Luzerne County	18704	
Effort	1	Monroe County	18330	
Egypt	1	Clearfield County		
Egypt	1	Jefferson County	15824	
Egypt	1	Lehigh County	18052	
Egypt Corners	1	Venango County		
Egypt Mills	1	Pike County	18324	
Ehrenfeld	1	Cambria County	15956	
Eichelbergertown	1	Bedford County	16650	
Eidenau	1	Butler County	16037	
Eighty Four (or Eighty-Four)	1	Washington County	15330	
Eisaman	1	Westmoreland County		
Eisenhower National Historic Site	1	Adams County	17325	
Ekastown	1	Butler County	16055	
Elam	1	Delaware County	19342	
Elbell	1	Jefferson County		
Elberta	1	Blair County	16601	
Elbinsville	1	Bedford County		
Elbon	1	Elk County	15823	
Elbridge	1	Tioga County		
Elbrook	1	Franklin County	17268	
Elco	1	Washington County	15434	
Elder Township	1	Cambria County		
Elderberry Pond	1	Bucks County		
Elders Ridge	1	Indiana County	15681	
Eldersville	1	Washington County	15036	
Elderton	1	Armstrong County	15736	
El-Do Lake	1	Monroe County		
Eldora	1	Lancaster County	17563	
Eldora	1	Washington County	15063	
Eldorado	1	Blair County		
Eldorado	1	Butler County	16049	
Eldred	1	McKean County	16731	
Eldred Center	1	Warren County		
Eldred Township	1	Jefferson County		
Eldred Township	1	Lycoming County		
Eldred Township	1	McKean County		
Eldred Township	1	Monroe County		
Eldred Township	1	Schuylkill County		
Eldred Township	1	Warren County		
Eldredsville	1	Sullivan County	18616	
Elephant	1	Bucks County	18944	
Eleven Mile	1	Potter County	16923	
Elfinwild	1	Allegheny County	15101	
Elgin	1	Erie County	16413	
Elgin Park	1	Delaware County	19073	
Elim	1	Cambria County	15905	
Elimsport	1	Lycoming County	17810	
Elizabeth	1	Allegheny County	15037	
Elizabeth Township	1	Allegheny County		
Elizabeth Township	1	Lancaster County		
Elizabethtown	1	Lancaster County	17022	
Elizabethville	1	Dauphin County	17023	
Elk	1	Clarion County		
Elk City	1	Clarion County	16232	
Elk Creek	1	Erie County		
Elk Creek Township	1	Erie County		
Elk Grove	1	Columbia County	17814	
Elk Lake	1	Susquehanna County	18844	
Elk Lick Township	1	Somerset County		
Elk Park	1	Fayette County		
Elk Run Junction	1	Jefferson County	15767	
Elk Township	1	Chester County		
Elk Township	1	Clarion County		
Elk Township	1	Tioga County		
Elk Township	1	Warren County		
Elkdale	1	Chester County	19352	
Elkdale	1	Susquehanna County	18470	
Elkhorn	1	Allegheny County	15020	
Elkin	1	Indiana County		
Elkins Park	1	Montgomery County	19117	
Elkland	1	Tioga County	16920	
Elkland Township	1	Sullivan County		
Elkland Township	1	Tioga County		
Elkview	1	Chester County	19390	
Ellen Gowan	1	Schuylkill County	17976	
Ellendale Forge	1	Dauphin County		
Ellenton	1	Lycoming County	17724	
Ellerslie	1	Bucks County	19020	
Elliger Park	1	Montgomery County	19034	
Elliott	1	Allegheny County		
Elliott Heights	1	Lehigh County		
Elliotts Mills	1	Lawrence County	16057	
Elliottsburg	1	Perry County	17024	
Elliottson	1	Cumberland County	17013	
Elliottsville	1	Fayette County	15437	
Ellisburg	1	Potter County	16923	
Ellport	1	Lawrence County	16117	
Ellrod	1	Allegheny County	15132	
Ellsworth	1	Washington County	15331	
Ellwell	1	Bradford County		
Ellwood City	2	Beaver County	16117	
Ellwood City	2	Lawrence County	16117	
Ellwood Junction	1	Beaver County		
Elm	1	Lancaster County	17521	
Elm Grove	1	Fayette County		
Elmdale	1	Lackawanna County		
Elmer	1	Potter County	16950	
Elmhurst	1	Lackawanna County		
Elmhurst Township	1	Lackawanna County	18416	
Elmo	1	Clarion County	16232	
Elmora	1	Cambria County	15737	
Elmwood	1	Philadelphia County		
Elmwood	1	York County	17403	
Elmwood Terrace	1	Bucks County		
Elora	1	Butler County	16057	
Elrama	1	Washington County	15038	
Elrico	1	Westmoreland County	15684	
Elroy	1	Montgomery County	18964	
Elstie	1	Cambria County	16613	
Elstonville	1	Lancaster County	17545	
Elton	1	Cambria County	15934	
Elverson	1	Chester County	19520	
Elwood Park	1	Washington County	15301	
Elwyn	1	Delaware County	19063	
Elwyn Terrace	1	Lancaster County	17545	
Elysburg	1	Northumberland County	17824	
Emanuelsville	1	Northampton County	18014	
Emblem	1	Allegheny County	15131	
Embreeville	1	Chester County	19320	
Emeigh	1	Cambria County	15738	
Emerald	1	Greene County	15322	
Emerald	1	Lehigh County	18080	
Emerickville	1	Jefferson County	15825	
Emigh Run	1	Indiana County	15724	
Emigsville	1	York County	17318	
Emilie	1	Bucks County		
Emlenton	2	Clarion County	16373	
Emlenton	2	Venango County	16373	
Emmaus	1	Lehigh County	18049	
Emmaus Junction	1	Lehigh County		
Emmaville	1	Fulton County	15536	
Emmons	1	Sullivan County		
Emporium	1	Cameron County	15834	
Emporium Junction	1	Cameron County	15834	
Emsworth	1	Allegheny County	15202	
End	1	Fulton County		
Endeavor	1	Forest County	16322	
Enders	1	Dauphin County	17032	
Energy	1	Lawrence County	16101	
Enfield	1	Montgomery County	19075	
Engelside	1	Philadelphia County		
Engles Lake	1	Monroe County	18370	
Engles Mill	1	Somerset County		
Engleside	1	Lancaster County		
Englesville	1	Berks County	19512	
Englewood	1	Schuylkill County	17931	
English Center	1	Lycoming County	17776	
Enhaut	1	Dauphin County	17113	
Enid	1	Fulton County	16691	
Enlow	1	Allegheny County	15126	
Ennisville	1	Huntingdon County	16652	
Enoch	1	Somerset County		
Enola	1	Cumberland County	17025	
Enon	1	Lawrence County		
Enon	1	Washington County	15377	
Enon Valley	1	Lawrence County	16120	
Enterline	1	Dauphin County	17032	
Enterprise	1	Indiana County		
Enterprise	1	Mercer County	16127	
Enterprise	1	Northumberland County	17825	
Enterprise	1	Warren County	16354	
Enterprise Siding	1	Luzerne County		
Entlerville	1	Cumberland County	17241	
Entriken	1	Huntingdon County	16638	
Ephrata	1	Lancaster County	17522	
Ephrata Township	1	Lancaster County		
Equinunk	1	Wayne County	18417	
Erbs Mill	1	Lancaster County		
Ercildoun	1	Chester County	19320	
Erdenheim	1	Montgomery County	19118	
Erdman	1	Dauphin County	17048	
Erhard	1	Clearfield County	16861	
Erie	1	Erie County	16501	99
Erie Heights	1	Erie County		
Erie International Airport	1	Erie County	16505	
Erie Junction	1	Jefferson County		
Eriton	1	Clearfield County		
Erlen	1	Montgomery County	19126	
Erly	1	Perry County	17024	
Ernest	1	Indiana County	15739	
Ernest	1	Montgomery County		
Erney	1	York County	17315	
Erwinna	1	Bucks County	18920	
Eshbach	1	Berks County	19505	
Eshcol	1	Perry County	17062	
Esplen	1	Allegheny County		
Espy	1	Columbia County	17815	
Espyville	1	Crawford County		
Espyville Station	1	Crawford County	16414	16424
Essen	1	Allegheny County		
Essington	1	Delaware County	19029	
Essington-Lester	1	Delaware County		
Estella	1	Sullivan County	18616	
Esterly	1	Berks County	19606	
Esther	1	Beaver County	15052	
Estherton	1	Dauphin County	17110	
Etna	1	Allegheny County	15223	
Etna Furnace	1	Blair County		
Etters	1	York County	17319	
Euclid	1	Butler County	16001	
Eulalia Township	1	Potter County		
Eureka	2	Bucks County	19454	
Eureka	1	Cambria County	15963	
Eureka	2	Montgomery County	19454	
Eureka	1	Westmoreland County	15479	
Eustontown	1	Lebanon County	17042	
Evans	1	Fayette County	15401	
Evans City	1	Butler County	16033	
Evans Falls	1	Wyoming County	18657	
Evans Manor	1	Fayette County		
Evansburg	1	Butler County		
Evansburg	1	Montgomery County	19426	
Evanstown	1	Westmoreland County	15625	
Evansville	1	Berks County	19522	
Evansville	1	Columbia County	18603	
Evendale	1	Juniata County	17086	
Everett	1	Bedford County	15537	
Evergreen	1	Allegheny County		
Evergreen	1	Bradford County	18833	
Evergreen Park	1	Lehigh County	18052	
Everhartville	1	Perry County	17074	
Everson	1	Fayette County	15631	
Ewalt	1	Allegheny County	15212	
Ewen	1	Luzerne County		
Ewings Mill	1	Indiana County	15765	
Ewingsville	1	Allegheny County	15106	
Excelsior	1	Northumberland County	17825	
Exchange	1	Montour County	17821	
Exeter	1	Luzerne County	18643	
Exeter Township	1	Berks County		
Exeter Township	1	Luzerne County		
Exeter Township	1	Wyoming County		
Exmoor	1	Schuylkill County		
Experiment	1	Allegheny County		
Export	1	Westmoreland County	15632	
Exton	1	Chester County	19341	
Eyer	1	Huntingdon County		
Eyers Grove	1	Columbia County	17846	
Eyersgrove	1	Columbia County		
Eyersgrove Junction	1	Columbia County		
Eynon	1	Lackawanna County	18403	
