= Ed Roebuck =

American baseball player and scout (1931–2018)

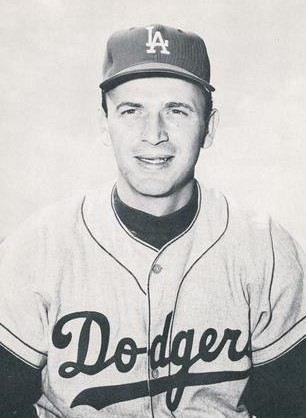
- Pitcher
- Born: July 3, 1931; East Millsboro, Pennsylvania, U.S.
- Died: June 14, 2018 (aged 86); Lakewood, California, U.S.
- Batted: Right Threw: Right

MLB debut
- April 18, 1955, for the Brooklyn Dodgers

Last MLB appearance
- July 7, 1966, for the Philadelphia Phillies

MLB statistics
- Win–loss record: 52–31
- Earned run average: 3.35
- Strikeouts: 477
- Saves: 62
- Stats at Baseball Reference

Teams
- Brooklyn / Los Angeles Dodgers (1955–1958; 1960–1963); Washington Senators (1963–1964); Philadelphia Phillies (1964–1966)

Career highlights and awards
- World Series champion (1955)

Edward Jack Roebuck (July 3, 1931 – June 14, 2018) was an American professional baseball relief pitcher and scout, who played in Major League Baseball (MLB) for 11 seasons (1955–1958; 1960–1967) for the Brooklyn / Los Angeles Dodgers, Washington Senators and Philadelphia Phillies. He appeared in the World Series with the Dodgers in 1955 and 1956. During his playing days, Roebuck stood 6 ft 2 in (1.88 m), weighing 185 lb (84 kg). He threw and batted right-handed.

== Pitching career ==
=== Brooklyn ===
Roebuck was born in East Millsboro, located in the heart of Southwest Pennsylvania's coal mining country. After attending Brownsville Area High School, he began his 19-season playing career in the Dodgers' organization in 1949, and was called to the majors in 1955 after winning 45 games over three years for the Triple-A Montreal Royals. Working out of the Brooklyn bullpen, the rookie got into 47 games, second only to relief ace Clem Labine's 60 games pitched, and posted 12 saves to lead the pennant-winning team. His earned run average was an effective 2.57 as late as July 22, but a succession of rough outings inflated his final ERA for 1955 to a poor 4.71. Roebuck made one appearance in the 1955 World Series against the New York Yankees, pitching two scoreless innings in Game 6 in relief of Russ Meyer in a 5–1 Brooklyn defeat. But the Dodgers came back the next day, October 4, 1955, to win Game 7 and Brooklyn's only world championship, 2–0, behind Johnny Podres' complete game shutout.

The next season, Roebuck had only one save in 43 games and led the National League in wild pitches, while the Dodgers repeated as league champions. In Game 2 of the 1956 World Series, he halted a five-run Yankee rally in the second inning against starting pitcher Don Newcombe by getting Joe Collins to ground out, then left for a pinch hitter in the Dodger half of the inning. Brooklyn scored six runs in that frame and went on to defeat the Yankees 13–8 behind the stellar, seven-inning relief work of Don Bessent. Roebuck made two more appearances, in Games 4 and 7, surrendering a 440 ft (130 m) home run to Mickey Mantle in the former game, and pitching two shutout innings of mop-up work in the latter, both Yankee victories.

In 1957, the Dodgers' last season in Brooklyn, Roebuck won eight of ten decisions and improved his earned run average to 2.71. He also made his only career MLB start, going five innings on June 5 against the Cincinnati Redlegs and allowing two runs in an eventual 3–0 Dodger defeat.

=== Los Angeles ===
His first two seasons as a Dodger in Los Angeles were ruined by a sore arm (1958), then a year-long minor league demotion (1959) that cost Roebuck the chance to earn a second World Series ring.

Roebuck was able to return to form at Triple-A and spend the next six full seasons in the majors, although he again experienced arm trouble in 1961, worked in only five games, and spent part of the year on the Dodgers' voluntarily retired list. But he rebounded again.

In 1962, he was the Dodgers' most successful bullpen ace, helping them to a first-place tie with their archrival, the San Francisco Giants, after the full slate of 162 games. But Los Angeles dropped the 1962 National League tie-breaker series, two games to one. Roebuck worked in all three games, allowing no runs and only two hits in 42/3 innings pitched over his first two outings as the teams split, one game apiece. In the decisive third game, officially the 165th regular season contest each team would play in 1962, Roebuck relieved Podres in the sixth inning and held the Giants scoreless for the next three frames, as the Dodgers took a 4–2 lead.

But in the top of the ninth inning, defensive lapses enabled the Giants to claw back against Roebuck. After being struck on the hand by a Willie Mays line drive single back through the box, he left the game with one out, a run in and the bases loaded. His successor on the mound, Stan Williams, then allowed a sacrifice fly to tie the game and issued a bases-loaded walk to give the Giants the lead; an insurance run then scored on an error. San Francisco won the 1962 National League pennant, with Roebuck charged with only his second loss in 12 decisions on the season, although his 64 appearances and ten victories were career bests.

=== Washington and Philadelphia ===
That season-ending, ninth-inning collapse affected Roebuck in 1963; he struggled on the mound for the Dodgers, with his ERA climbing by over a run to 4.24, and he was traded to the Senators on July 30. He got into 28 games for Washington's manager, former Dodger teammate Gil Hodges, before he was sent back to the Senior Circuit early in 1964. Teaming with Philadelphia's bullpen ace, Jack Baldschun, he responded with a standout season for the Phillies, notching 12 saves in 60 appearances and a career-best 2.21 ERA. But a disastrous, late-September losing streak cost the Phillies the National League title. In 1965, Roebuck posted five relief victories and three saves, but his workload and effectiveness diminished. The Phillies assigned him to Triple-A San Diego for 1966 and recalled him in midyear, but he dropped two decisions in six games and was released.

During his big-league career, Roebuck had a very high winning percentage: a mark of 52 wins and 31 defeats (.627) with seasons of 8–2 (1957), 8–3 (1960) and 10–2 (1962) for the Dodgers. He compiled 62 career saves and an ERA of 3.35. He worked in 460 games, all but one in relief, and in 791 innings pitched, he allowed 753 hits and 302 bases on balls, with 477 strikeouts. A competent batsman, Roebuck collected 28 hits (including two home runs) and batted .204 lifetime in the majors.

Roebuck was also known as one of the game's finest fungo hitters, who endeavored to hit fungo home runs from home plate in every MLB stadium. In 1964, still an active player with the rival Phillies, Roebuck was asked by Roy Hofheinz, owner of the Houston Colt .45s, to hit the highest fungo fly balls he could in order to determine the ideal roof height for baseball's first domed stadium, the Astrodome, still under construction at the time.

== Longtime scout ==
After his playing career ended, Roebuck was a scout for a number of teams, including the Dodgers, Phillies, Atlanta Braves, Cincinnati Reds, Pittsburgh Pirates and Boston Red Sox. He retired in 2004 and died June 14, 2018, at age 86 in Lakewood, California, where he had lived since 1958.
