= Sherman Creek =

Sherman Creek may refer to:

- Sherman Creek (New York)
- Shermans Creek (Pennsylvania)
