= Delville =

Delville may refer to:

== Places ==
- Deville, Alberta, a locality in Canada
- Dellville, Pennsylvania, United States
- Delville House, country house in Glasnevin, Ireland

== Other uses ==
- Battle of Delville Wood, an engagement in the 1916 Battle of the Somme in the First World War
  - Delville Wood South African National Memorial, a World War I memorial
  - Delville Wood Cemetery, a cemetery located near Longueval, France

== People with the surname Delville ==
- Jean Delville (1867–1953), Belgian symbolist painter, writer, and occultist
- Jean-Pierre Delville, (born 1951), Belgian Catholic bishop of Liège
- Michel Delville (born 1969), Belgian musician, writer and teacher
