= Dean, Pennsylvania =

Unincorporated community in Pennsylvania, US

Dean
- Unincorporated community
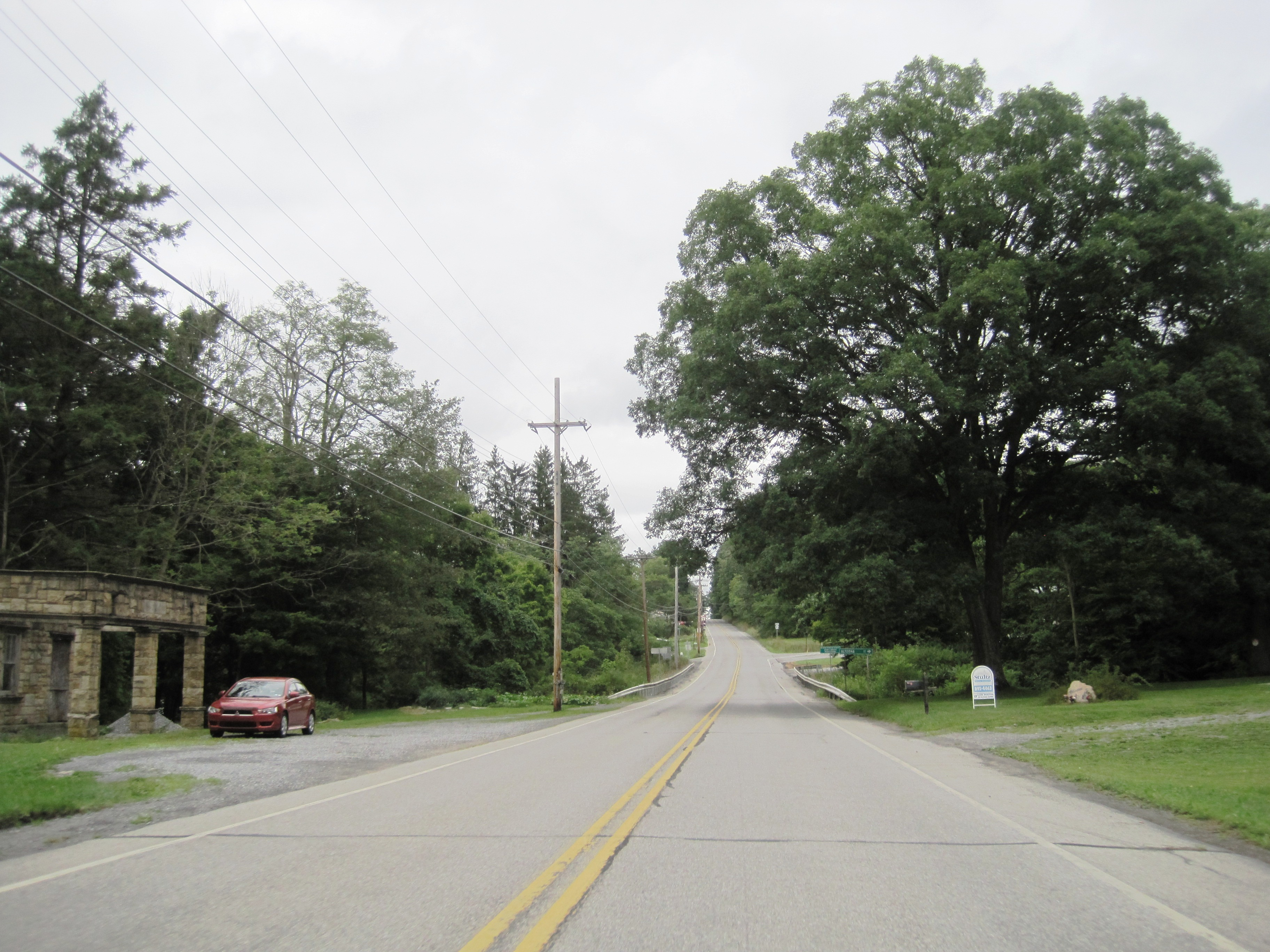
- PA 53 northbound in Dean

- Location within the U.S. state of Pennsylvania Dean (the United States)
- Coordinates: 40°37′19.2374″N 78°30′02.0653″W
- Country: United States
- State: Pennsylvania
- County: Cambria
- Township: Dean

Population (2000)
  - Total: 408
- Time zone: UTC-5 (Eastern (EST))
  - Summer (DST): UTC-4 (EDT)
- GNIS feature ID: 1173030

Dean is a village and an unincorporated community within Dean Township in Cambria County, Pennsylvania, United States. It is part of the Johnstown, Pennsylvania Metropolitan Statistical Area.
