= Teresa Celli =

American lyric soprano and actress (1923–1999)

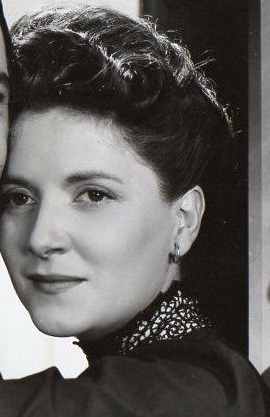
- Celli in Black Hand (1950)
- Born: Teresa Mara Levis; June 6, 1923; Dysart, Pennsylvania, U.S.
- Died: October 30, 1999 (aged 76); Clearwater, Florida, U.S.
- Occupations: Lyric soprano, actress
- Spouse: Barry Nelson (m. 1951; div. 1965)

Teresa Mara Levis (June 6, 1923 – October 30, 1999), better known as Teresa Celli, was an American lyric soprano who apprenticed at La Scala before achieving recognition in films such as The Asphalt Jungle (1950) and Black Hand (1950).

== Formative years and family ==
Celli was born on June 6, 1923 as Teresa Levis in Dysart, Pennsylvania. One of ten children born to an Italian family, she relocated with her family to Milan, Italy when she was just five years old because her father had inherited an estate there. Her grandmother, Maria Scagnet, and her great-grandmother, Mme. Duval Celli, both sang opera, and it was from the latter that Teresa Levis took her professional last name, "Celli."

While she lived in Italy, Celli was a student of soprano Ersilde Cervi Caroli. Under his mentorship, she became active in both opera and dramatic productions.

Sometime during World War II, she returned to the United States, but then returned to Italy when the war ended.

She later became the first wife of actor Barry Nelson, and was married to him from 1951 to 1965.

== Music and film career ==
During the early years of her performance career, Celli was under contract with Italy's renowned opera house, La Scala. Her American radio debut occurred on March 5, 1949, on the NBC program Star Theater with Frank Sinatra.

Celli's film debut came in Border Incident (1949).

In 1950, she appeared in The Asphalt Jungle, which was later nominated for four Academy Awards, with Gene Kelly in Black Hand and in Right Cross with Ricardo Montalbán. Under contract to Metro-Goldwyn-Mayer, she was subsequently given a leave of absence to return to Italy for three months of additional operatic training that same year. That trip was postponed, however, when Celli was cast by Peter Herman Adler in The Great Caruso in August 1950; the film was released in 1951.

== Later years ==
During her mid-sixties, Celli relocated to Clearwater, Florida, where she spent her remaining years and became a member of that community's Church of Christ. She died at her home in Clearwater, Florida on October 30, 1999 at the age of 76.
