= Dellville Covered Bridge =

Covered bridge in Pennsylvania, US

- U.S. National Register of Historic Places
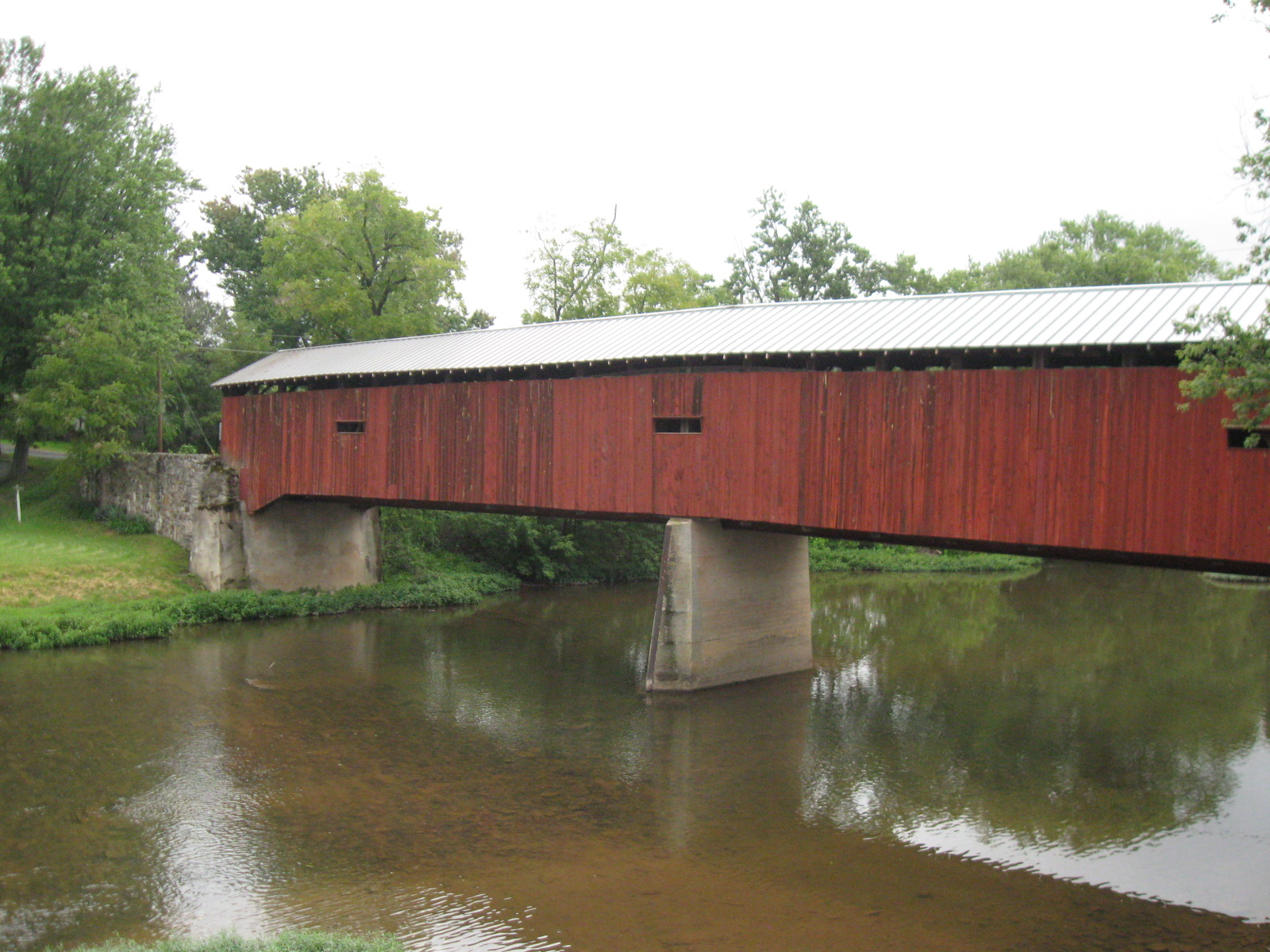
- The bridge in 2012

- Location within Pennsylvania Location within the United States
- Location: T 456, Wheatfield Township, Pennsylvania
- Coordinates: 40°21′49″N 77°7′0″W
- Area: 0.1 acres (0.040 ha)
- Built: 1889 (rebuilt 2019)
- Architect: Clouser, Andrew
- Architectural style: Burr
- MPS: Covered Bridges of Adams, Cumberland, and Perry Counties TR
- NRHP reference No.: 80003593
- Added to NRHP: August 25, 1980

The Dellville Covered Bridge is a wooden covered bridge located in Dellville Pennsylvania. It is a 174-foot-long (53 m), three span, burr truss bridge over Shermans Creek, built to replace a previous covered bridge constructed in 1889 by Andrew Clouser.

The original bridge was listed on the National Register of Historic Places in 1980.

On November 3, 2014, it was significantly damaged in a fire that police later ruled was arson. In 2017, work removing the burned and charred remains of the old Dellville Covered Bridge began, and in 2018, the work rebuilding the bridge began in earnest. By July 2019, the new replica bridge was completed at a cost of $966,000. In November 2019, two men were charged as juveniles for the arson.
