= Dellville, Pennsylvania =

Unincorporated community in Pennsylvania, US

- Unincorporated community
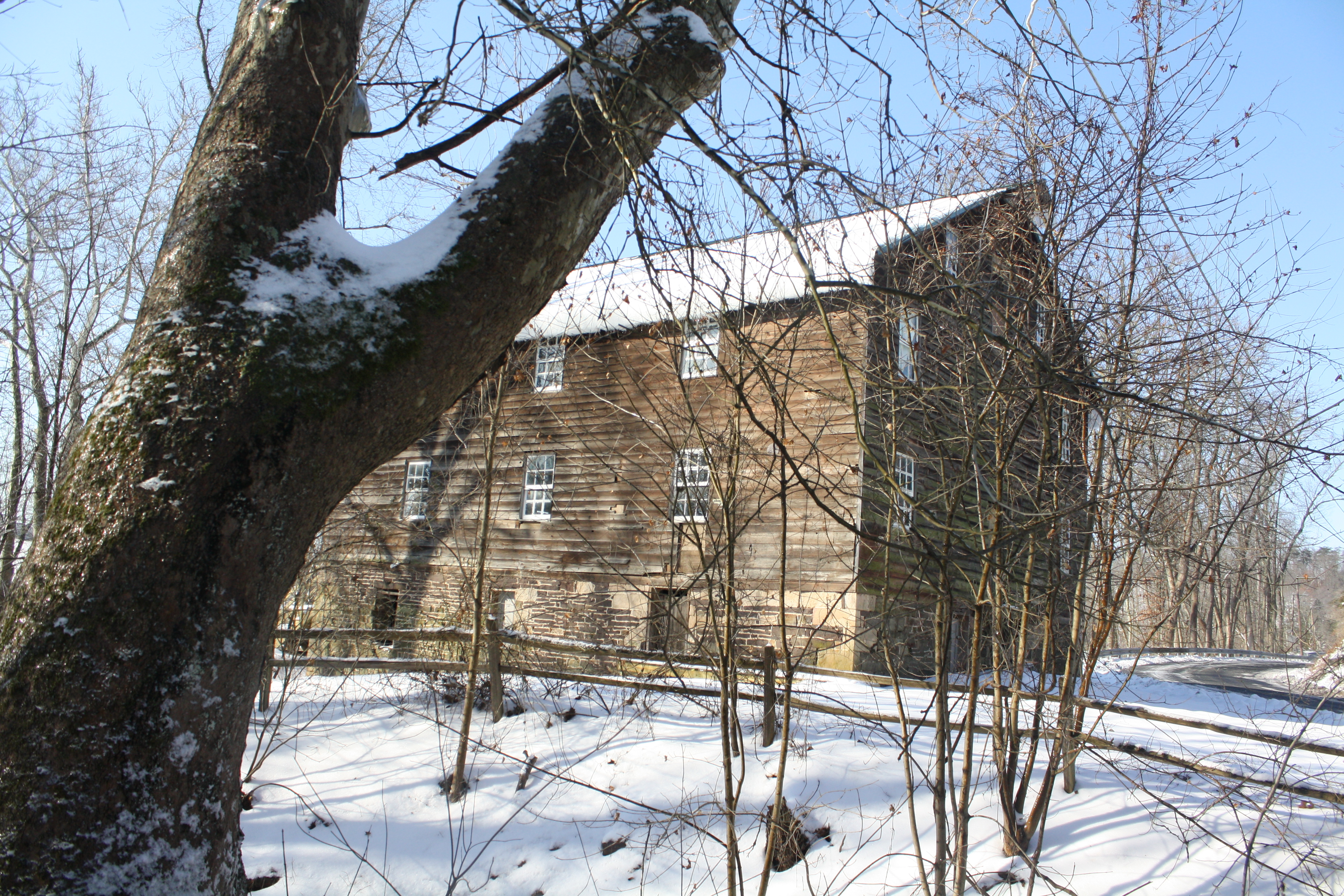
- Dellville Mill

- Location within Pennsylvania Location within the United States
- Coordinates: 40°21′50″N 77°06′57″W
- Country: United States
- State: Pennsylvania
- County: Perry
- Elevation: 407 ft (124 m)
- Time zone: UTC-5 (Eastern (EST))
  - Summer (DST): UTC-4 (EDT)
- GNIS feature ID: 1173137

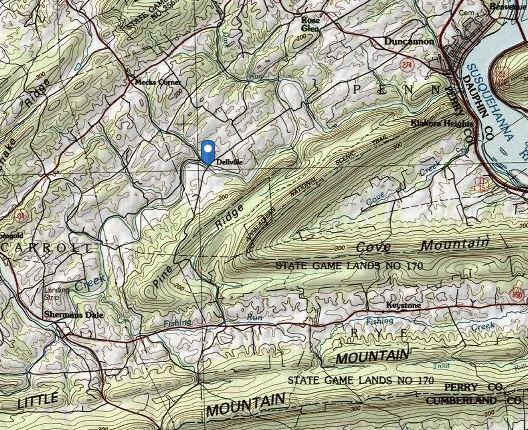
The geographical landscape characteristics of Dellville and surrounding area, as shown on this topographical map.

Dellville is a village in Wheatfield Township, United States. The settlement is located within the Harrisburg–Carlisle metropolitan statistical area.

== Population ==
Determining the ethnic population of Dellville is a challenge, as the area is not a census designated place. Additionally, there is widespread inaccuracy among the locals as to what specific ethnicity falling in the general class of caucasian they are. Most identify as either German, Irish, or Scots-Irish, while some simply identify as American. Despite these factors, sourcing historical documents and county data makes it clear (albeit with imperfect accuracy) that Dellville is predominantly German ethnically, though sizable Irish population exists as well. The original church in the area was a German Reformed Church plant. Perry County as a whole self-identifies as 45.2% German (43.3% "German" and 1.9% "Pennsylvania German", with the latter being Anabaptist people in other parts of the county), however, as Dellville has no major commerce area, there is a statistical likelihood of a higher German percentage of population.

== Structures ==
It is most famous as the site of the Dellville Covered Bridge. The bridge was built either in 1810 or 1889, steel beams were added in the 1950s, and it was repaired in 1973 after Hurricane Agnes. In 2007, the Dellville Covered Bridge was barred from traffic, with a new bridge (made of concrete) receiving the redirected traffic. In November 2014 the Dellville covered bridge was arsoned, and in March 2018, reconstruction began on the bridge. It was finished in 2019.

There is one church in Dellville, presently a Methodist church, but there is some evidence to suggest that it was formerly a Lutheran church. The church was expanded from its original size, though the time of this is not known.

A store, now not used as such, was built in 1855 and first kept by Adam Billow. A post office was established in 1860, and the first postmaster was Eli Young, who served 14 years. There is no longer a post office in Dellville.

The mill was one of the main parts of the village, and had various owners from the time it was built in 1841.

== Geography ==
Dellville is one of many villages and towns in Perry County to have the Shermans Creek, which flows into the Susquehanna River in Duncannon, run through it. The Appalachian Trail passes through nearby, but is not easily accessible for another seven miles.

As the Appalachian Mountains run nearby, Dellville is in the Appalachian foothills and the Appalachian mountains are to the southeast. The specific ridge is Pine Ridge. The incline is quite observable on Pine Hill Road.

The land surrounding Dellville is primarily agricultural, as is evident by satellite imagery, as well as historical documents pertaining to the founding of the village. However, there are also significant areas of woodlands, with springs which are tributaries to Shermans Creek, especially further from the village, in the area.

The woodlands surrounding Dellville predominantly contain red maple, pitch pine, eastern white pine, eastern hemlock, birch, shagbark hickory, and beech trees, though American sycamore, ironwood, black walnut, juniper, oak, elm, alder, and sassafras are also fairly common.

== Gallery ==
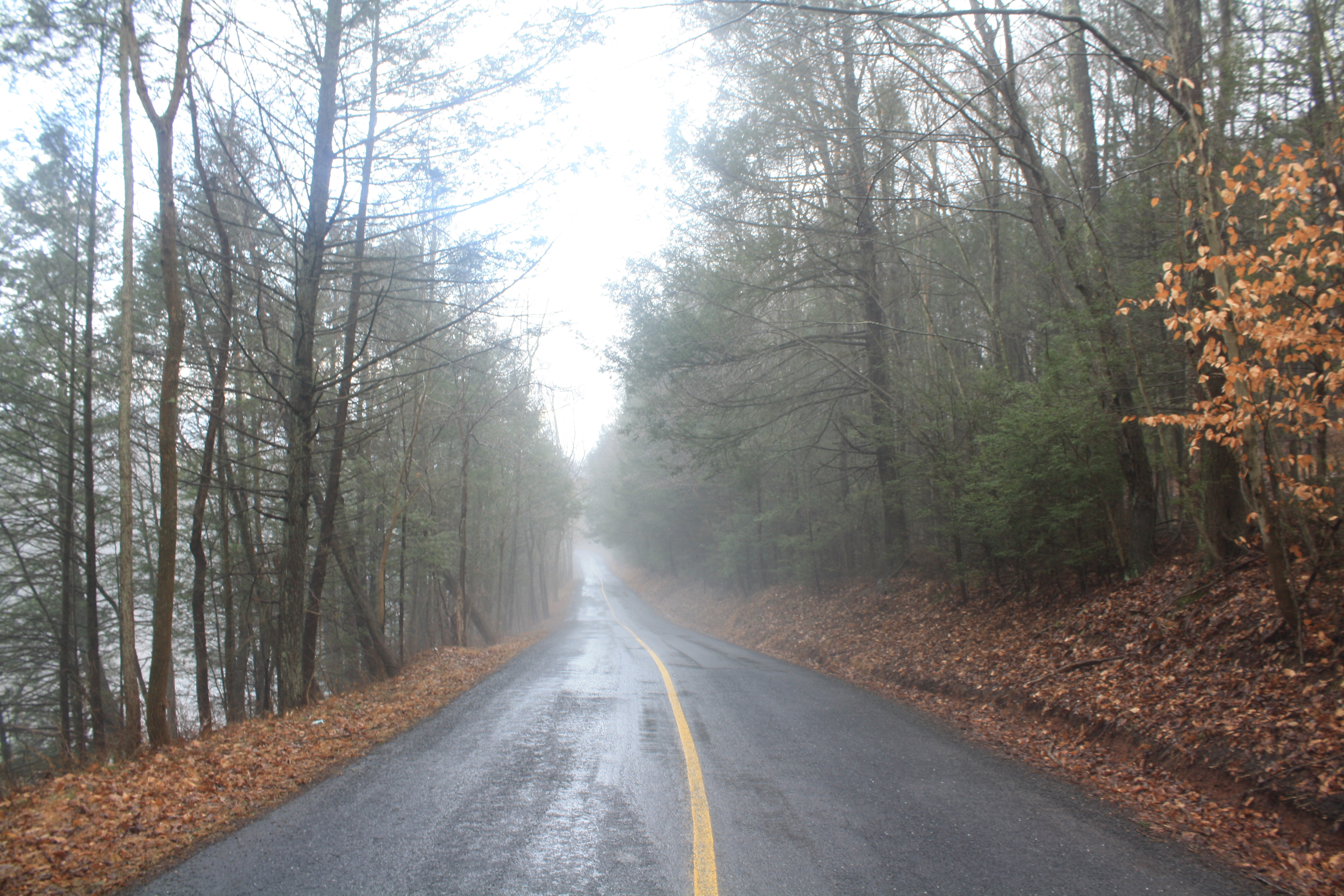
A road to Dellville.

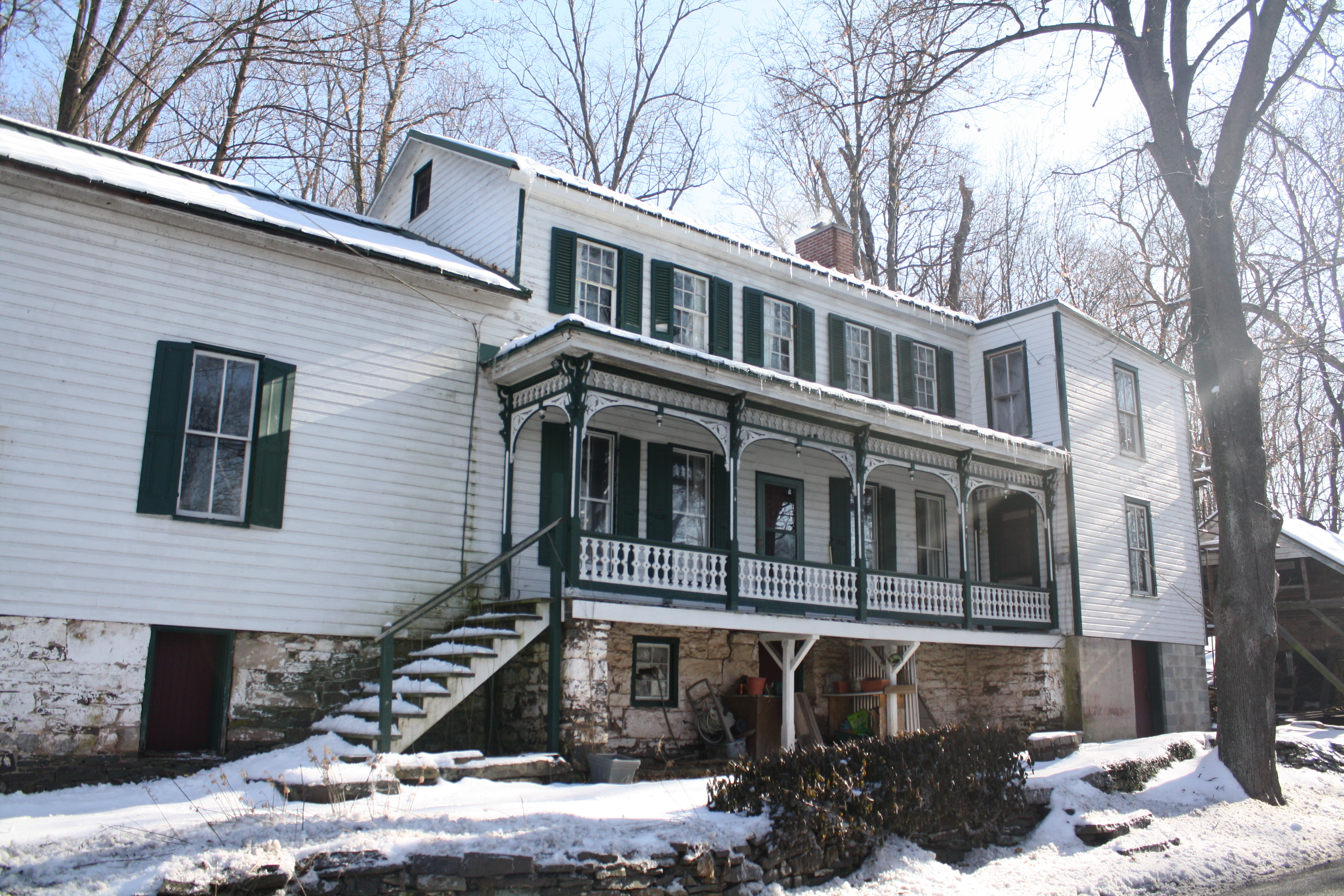
A locally famous building.

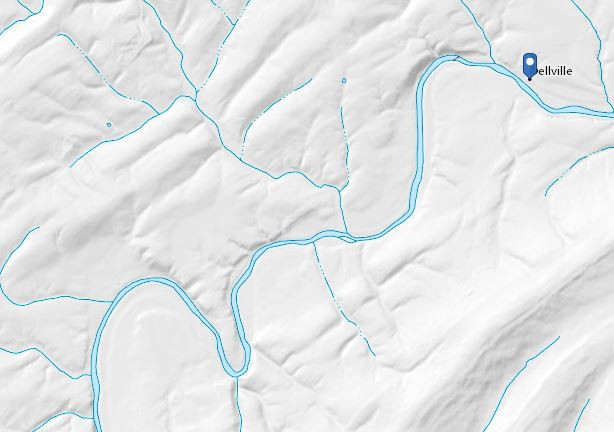
A topographic hydro map of the area, showing Shermans Creek and its tributaries.

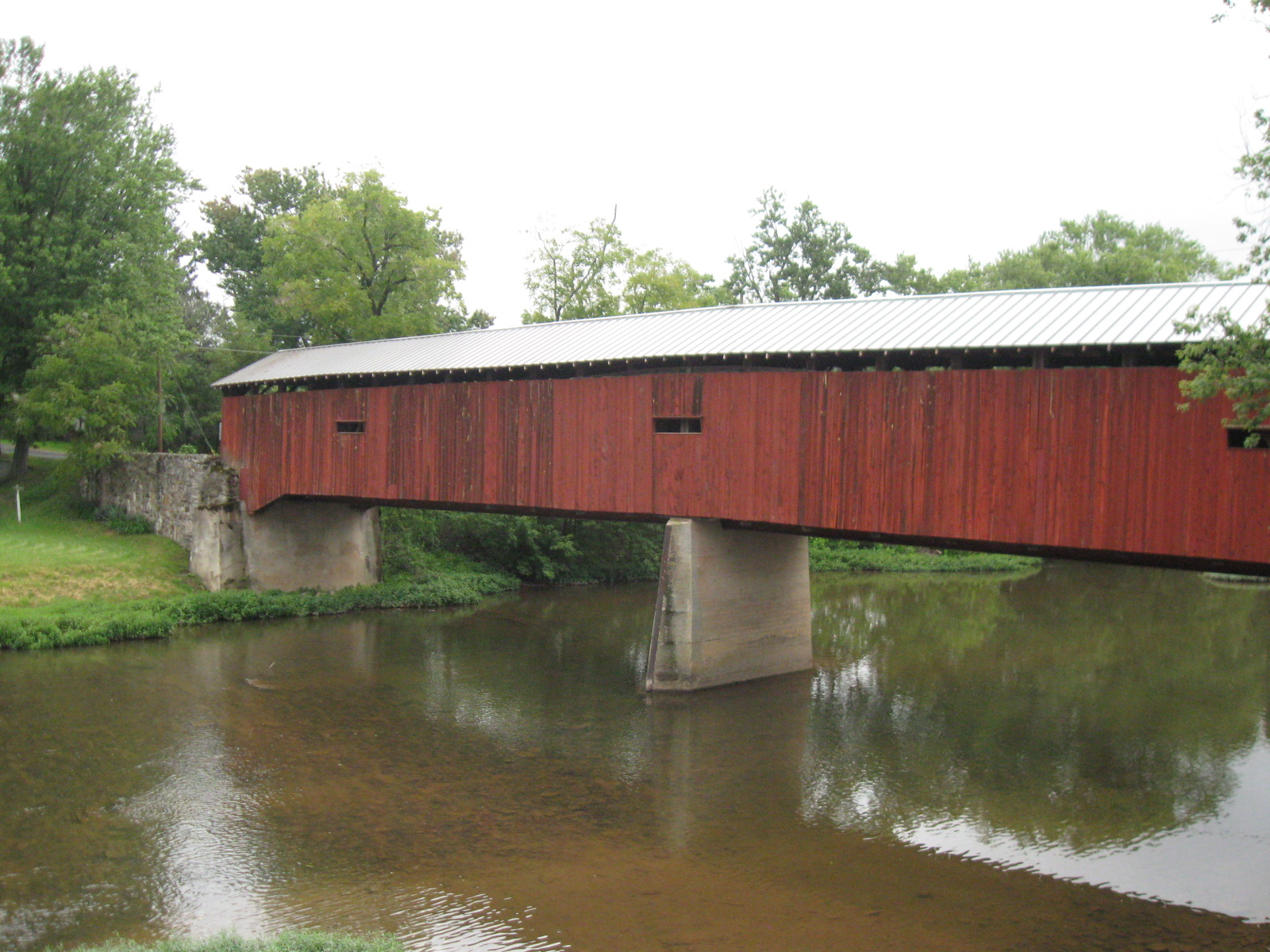
Pre-arson Dellville Covered Bridge, seen from the parallel concrete bridge.

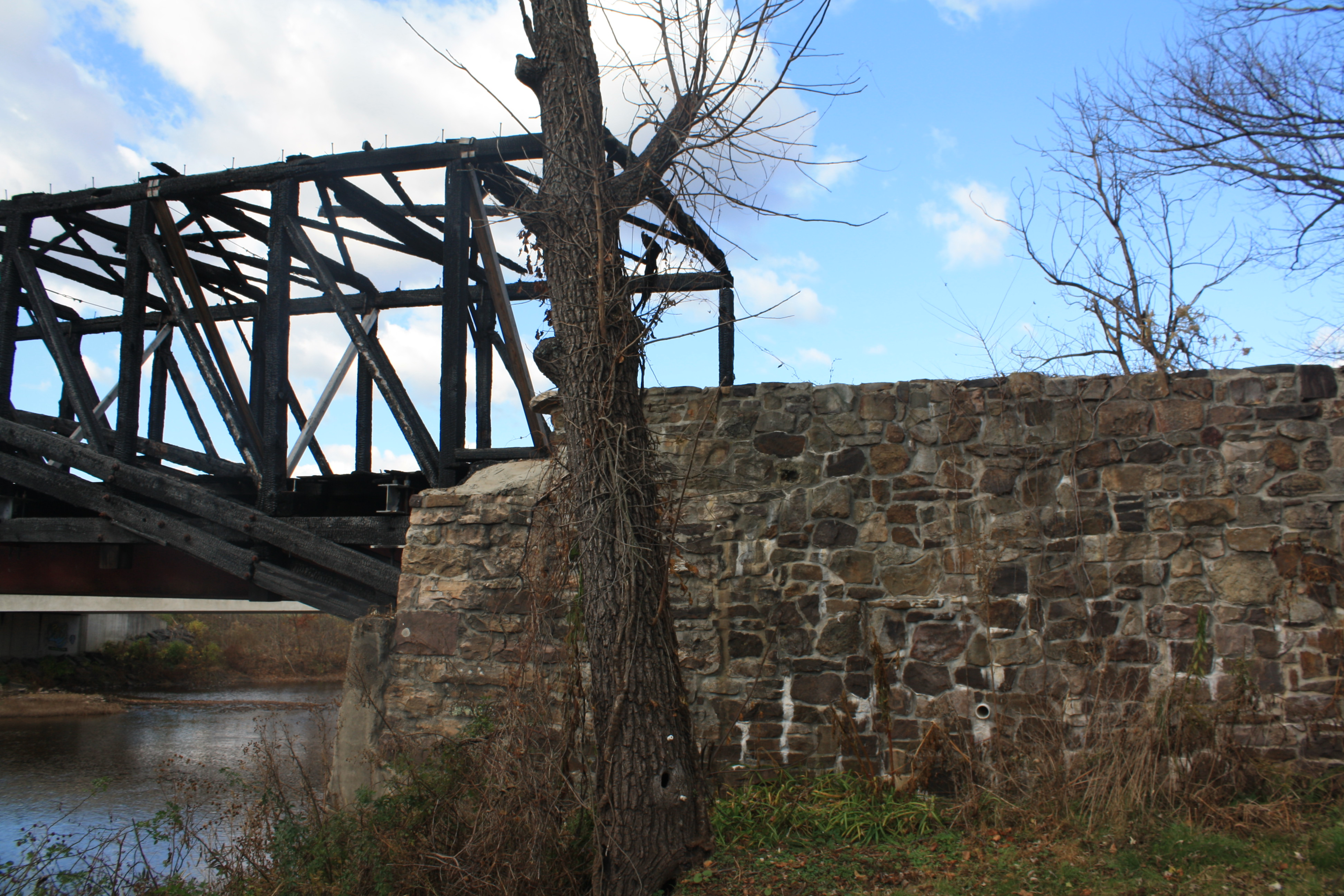
Dellville Covered Bridge, after arson.

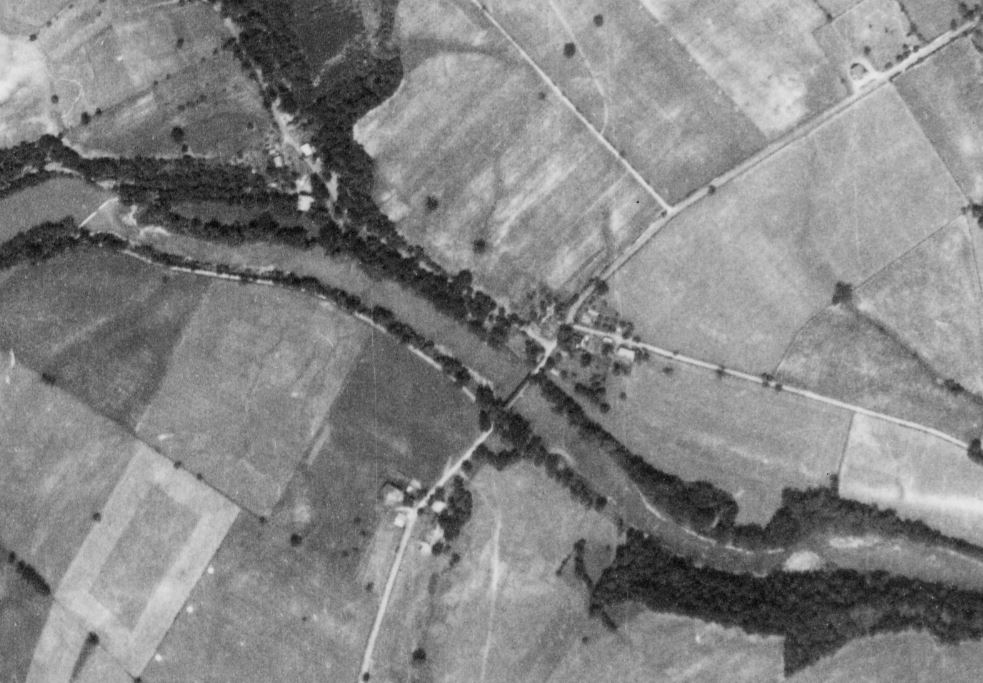
Dellville in 1937.
