= Dysart, Pennsylvania =

Unincorporated community in Pennsylvania, US

Coordinates: 40°35′48″N 78°31′01″W

Dysart is an unincorporated community located in Dean Township, Cambria County, Pennsylvania, United States.

The community lies along the railroad that runs parallel to the Clearfield Creek between Ashville and Frugality. The town grew up around the extraction of timber and bituminous coal. The community may have been named after James H. Dysart, a Blair County man involved in early mining enterprises in the area.

In the past, the town held a train station, grocery store and sawmill, but now all are gone. The local tavern, which has changed hands several times and the post office remain, sharing a common building.

An old school building is located up Route 53 from the bar. It served local children until the consolidation of area schools into the Cambria Heights and Penn Cambria School Districts in the 1960s. The structure is used as a municipal building now. A newly renovated playground sits next to the old school. Finally, the Laurel Run Sportsmans Club is located across the road from the old school. It is used for target shooting and banquet events with a gun range and large hall.

Most residents are either retirees or commute to a variety of jobs, many in Altoona, 10 miles away.

The population of the local 16636 zip code was 851 as recorded in the 2000 US Census.

== Notable people ==
- Teresa Celli, actress, was born in Dysart.
- Al Gionfriddo, outfielder and hero of 1947 World Series, was born in Dysart.
