= Black Hand (1950 film) =

1950 film by Richard Thorpe

- Theatrical release poster
- Directed by: Richard Thorpe
- Screenplay by: Luther Davis
- Story by: Leo Townsend
- Produced by: William H. Wright
- Starring: Gene Kelly; J. Carrol Naish; Teresa Celli
- Cinematography: Paul C. Vogel
- Edited by: Cotton Warburton
- Music by: Alberto Colombo
- Production company: Metro-Goldwyn-Mayer
- Distributed by: Metro-Goldwyn-Mayer
- Release dates: March 12, 1950 (New York); March 31, 1950 (Los Angeles)
- Running time: 92 minutes
- Country: United States
- Language: English
- Budget: $774,000
- Box office: $1,210,000

Black Hand is a 1950 American crime film noir directed by Richard Thorpe for Metro-Goldwyn-Mayer. It stars Gene Kelly, in a rare dramatic turn, as an Italian immigrant fighting against the Black Hand extortion racket in New York City in the first decade of the 20th century. The film co-stars J. Carroll Naish and Teresa Celli.

== Plot ==
In 1900, Roberto Colombo, an Italian-born attorney living in the Little Italy section of New York City, is killed by gangsters as he meets with a police officer to divulge information about an extortion attempt. His widow and son return to Italy, where his widow dies. Eight years later, his son Giovanni returns to New York, determined to wage a vendetta against the men who killed his father. He meets with childhood friend Isabella Gomboli and police detective Louis Lorelli, who try to dissuade him.

A man whom Giovanni had hoped would tell him about his father's killers is murdered. Giovanni and Isabella work to rally people in Little Italy against the Black Hand racket, but the movement is dealt a setback when Giovanni is attacked and his leg is broken. Recovering from his injury, Giovanni resolves to study law as his father had, with the help of Isabella, with whom he has fallen in love. When Lorelli shows them evidence uncovered after a bombing of a local store, Giovanni delays his studies to help find the perpetrators.

A court trial comes to nothing when a key witness is intimidated and refuses to testify, but the defendant is deported when police in Naples identify him as a fugitive from justice. Following the deportation, Lorelli travels to Italy to examine photographs of Italian criminals who are at large, hoping to identify other New York gangsters who could be deported to Italy. After he has mailed a list with the results of his research back to Giovanni in New York, Lorelli is attacked and killed.

In an attempt to prevent Lorelli's list from reaching the authorities, gangsters kidnap Isabella's young brother. Giovanni is captured while trying to save him and reveals the location of the list to the gangsters after they threaten to cripple the boy. After the gangsters acquire the list and the boy is released, Giovanni escapes and saves the list by igniting a bomb that he finds in the gangsters' hideout.

== Cast ==
- Gene Kelly as Giovanni E. "Johnny" Columbo
- J. Carrol Naish as Louis Lorelli
- Teresa Celli as Isabella Gomboli
- Marc Lawrence as Caesar Xavier Serpi
- Frank Puglia as Carlo Sabballera
- Barry Kelley as Police Captain Thompson
- Mario Siletti as Benny Danetta / Nino
- Carl Milletaire as George Allani / Tomasino
- Peter Brocco as Roberto Columbo
- Eleonora von Mendelssohn as Maria Columbo
- Grazia Narciso as Mrs. Danetta
- Maurice Samuels as Moriani
- Burk Symon as Judge
- Bert Freed as Prosecutor
- Mimi Aguglia as Mrs. Sabballera

== Reception ==
In a contemporary review for The New York Times, critic Bosley Crowther wrote:

Even though M.-G.-M.'s "Black Hand" ... might cynically be designated as just a period gangster film, it has more to recommend it than a good, adventurous gangster plot. It has, in its picturization of New York's "little Italy" back in the unrestricted period of this century's first decade, some rather affecting indications of the crowded and troubled world, novel and mystifying, in which this city's Italian immigrants lived. ... Mr. Kelly is eminently .forceful as a young Italian-American who aspires to help his neighbors rid themselves of the bands of terrorists and extortionists which are fearfully known as "the Black Hand." ... One might tactfully question the simplicity of the plot, prepared by Luther Davis, as a wee bit theatrical. ... But the story and the direction of Richard Thorp [sic] have made much and well of opportunities for showing the nature and behavior of poor people in terror's grip. And the simple, human aspects of kidnappings, bombings and relations with the police are pathetically and humorously indicated. Herein lies the character of the film.

Critic John L. Scott of the Los Angeles Times described the film as having "striking dramatic qualities" and wrote: "Excellent production values distinguish the film, which seems to carry a feeling of authenticity. ... Kelly presents an outstanding performance in this change of pace from dancing roles."

According to MGM records, the film earned $772,000 in the U.S. and Canada and $438,000 elsewhere, resulting in a loss of $55,000.
