= Doubling Gap, Pennsylvania =

Unincorporated community in Pennsylvania, U.S.

Coordinates: 40°16′50″N 77°25′09″W

Doubling Gap is an unincorporated community in Cumberland County, in the U.S. state of Pennsylvania.

== History ==
The community takes its name from a nearby, unusually-shaped mountain pass. As early as 1820, a mineral spa resort operated at Doubling Gap. A post office at Doubling Gap operated seasonally in the summers from 1919 until 1927.
