= East Lenox, Pennsylvania =

Unincorporated community in Pennsylvania, US

East Lenox
- Unincorporated community
- Location within the state of Pennsylvania East Lenox (the United States)
- Coordinates: 41°42′2″N 75°38′37″W
- Country: United States
- State: Pennsylvania
- County: Susquehanna
- Township: Lenox Township
- Elevation: 1,407 ft (429 m)
- Time zone: UTC-5 (Eastern (EST))
  - Summer (DST): UTC-4 (EDT)
- GNIS feature ID: 1203477

East Lenox is an unincorporated community located in Lenox Township, Susquehanna County, Pennsylvania, United States.
