= Dickerson Run, Pennsylvania =

Unincorporated community in Pennsylvania, US

- Unincorporated community
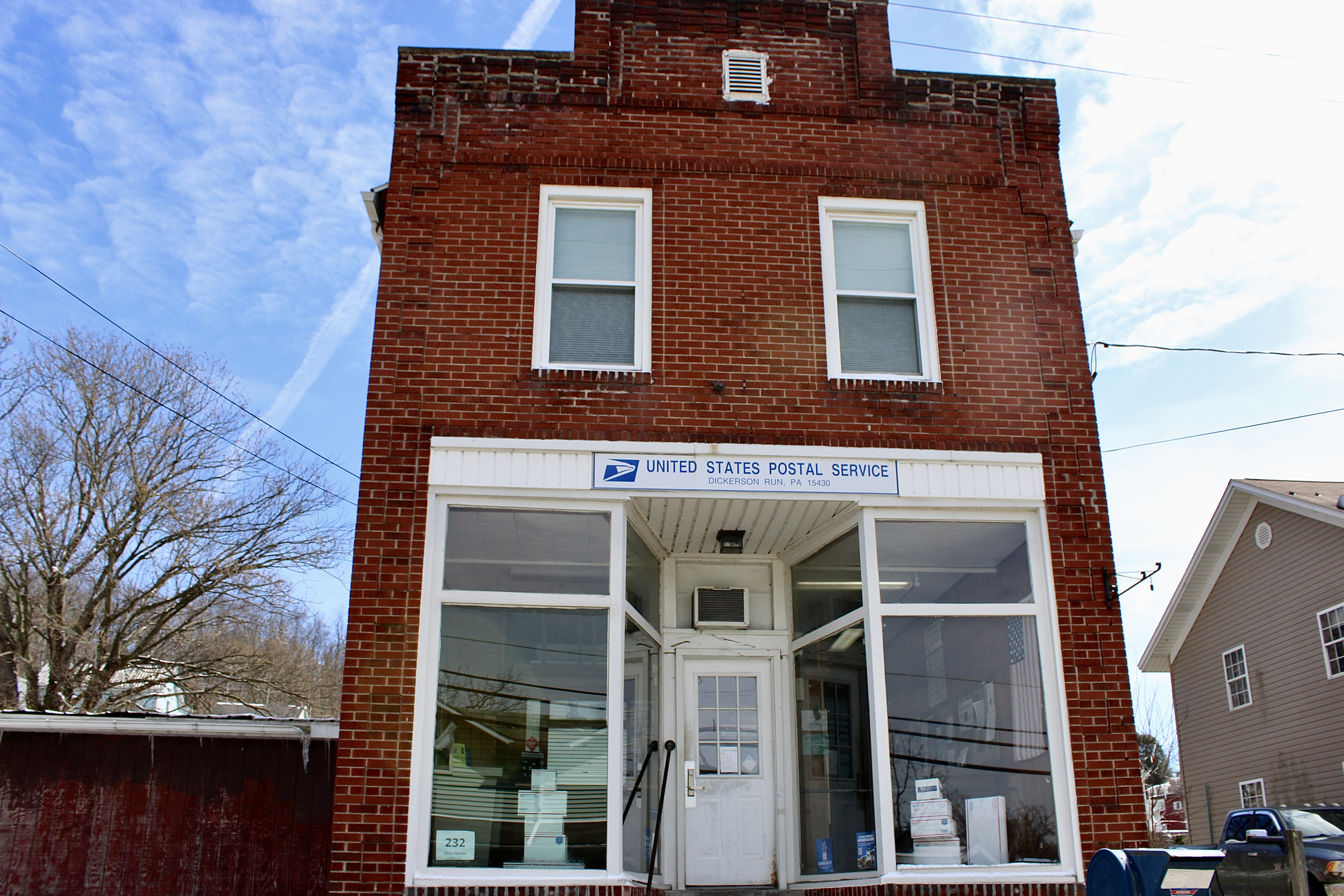
- Dickerson Run post office

- Location within Pennsylvania
- Coordinates: 40°02′44″N 79°39′59″W
- Country: United States
- State: Pennsylvania
- County: Fayette
- Elevation: 968 ft (295 m)
- Time zone: UTC-5 (Eastern (EST))
  - Summer (DST): UTC-4 (EDT)
- ZIP code: 15430
- Area codes: 724, 878
- GNIS feature ID: 1173246

Dickerson Run is an unincorporated community in Fayette County, Pennsylvania, United States. The community is located along the Youghiogheny River, 0.9 miles (1.4 km) north of Vanderbilt. Dickerson Run has a post office with ZIP code 15430, which opened on July 26, 1889.
