= Eastlawn Gardens, Pennsylvania =

Unincorporated community in Pennsylvania, US

Eastlawn Gardens
- Census-designated place
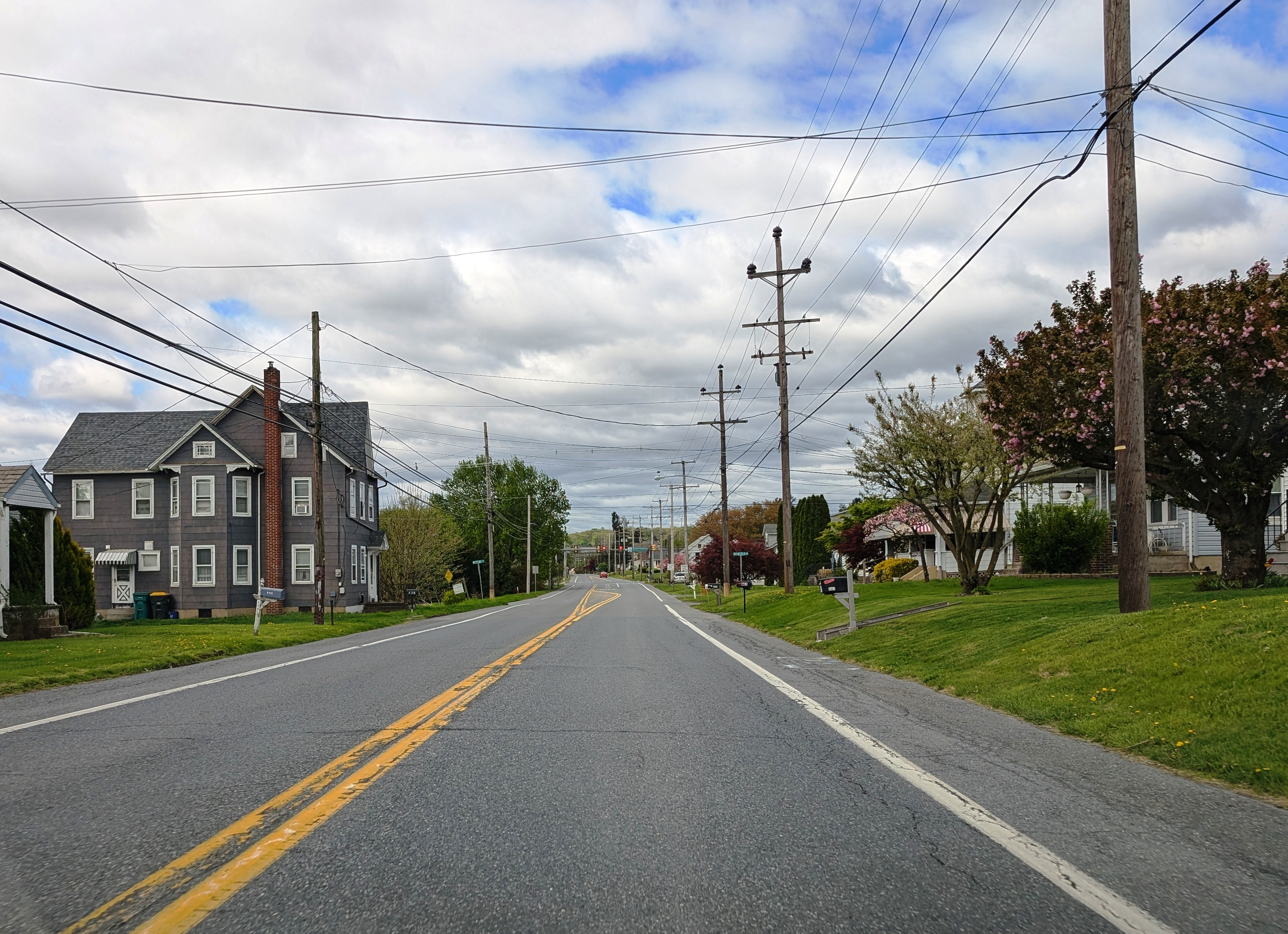
- PA 191 southbound through Eastlawn Gardens

- Location of Eastlawn Gardens in Pennsylvania Eastlawn Gardens (the United States)
- Coordinates: 40°44′57″N 75°17′55″W
- Country: United States
- State: Pennsylvania
- County: Northampton

Area
  - Census-designated place: 1.7 sq mi (4.4 km^{2})
  - Land: 1.7 sq mi (4.4 km^{2})
  - Water: 0.04 sq mi (0.10 km^{2})
- Elevation: 469 ft (143 m)

Population (2010)
  - Census-designated place: 3,307
  - Density: 1,900/sq mi (750/km^{2})
  - Metro: 865,310 (US: 68th)
- Time zone: UTC-5 (EST)
  - Summer (DST): UTC-4 (EDT)
- Area code: 610

Eastlawn Gardens is a census-designated place (CDP) in Upper Nazareth Township in Northampton County, Pennsylvania, United States. The population of Eastlawn Gardens was 3,307 at the 2010 census. Eastlawn Gardens is part of the Lehigh Valley metropolitan area, which had a population of 861,899 and was the 68th-most populous metropolitan area in the U.S. as of the 2020 census.

== Geography ==
Eastlawn Gardens is located at 40°44′57″N 75°17′55″W (40.749065, -75.298750). According to the U.S. Census Bureau, Eastlawn Gardens has a total area of 1.7 square miles (4.4 km^{2}), of which 1.7 square miles (4.4 km^{2}) is land and 0.04 square miles (0.10 km^{2}) (1.20%) is water.

== Demographics ==
=== 2020 census ===
As of the 2020 census, Eastlawn Gardens had a population of 3,435. The median age was 44.7 years. 21.2% of residents were under the age of 18 and 17.3% of residents were 65 years of age or older. For every 100 females there were 100.5 males, and for every 100 females age 18 and over there were 95.8 males age 18 and over.

98.0% of residents lived in urban areas, while 2.0% lived in rural areas.

There were 1,296 households in Eastlawn Gardens, of which 34.0% had children under the age of 18 living in them. Of all households, 64.7% were married-couple households, 10.8% were households with a male householder and no spouse or partner present, and 19.6% were households with a female householder and no spouse or partner present. About 18.5% of all households were made up of individuals and 8.7% had someone living alone who was 65 years of age or older.

There were 1,310 housing units, of which 1.1% were vacant. The homeowner vacancy rate was 0.7% and the rental vacancy rate was 0.0%.

Racial composition as of the 2020 census
Race	Number	Percent
White	3,051	88.8%
Black or African American	59	1.7%
American Indian and Alaska Native	5	0.1%
Asian	97	2.8%
Native Hawaiian and Other Pacific Islander	1	0.0%
Some other race	55	1.6%
Two or more races	167	4.9%
Hispanic or Latino (of any race)	159	4.6%

=== 2000 census ===
As of the census of 2000, there were 2,832 people, 1,010 households, and 804 families residing in the CDP. The population density was 1,709.6 inhabitants per square mile (660.1/km^{2}). There were 1,028 housing units at an average density of 620.6 per square mile (239.6/km^{2}). The racial makeup of the CDP was 97.81% White, 0.28% African American, 0.18% Native American, 0.53% Asian, 0.74% from other races, and 0.46% from two or more races. Hispanic or Latino of any race were 1.41% of the population.

There were 1,010 households, out of which 42.9% had children under the age of 18 living with them, 69.2% were married couples living together, 8.0% had a female householder with no husband present, and 20.3% were non-families. 16.6% of all households were made up of individuals, and 9.0% had someone living alone who was 65 years of age or older. The average household size was 2.80 and the average family size was 3.17.

In Eastlawn Gardens, the population was spread out, with 28.9% under the age of 18, 4.7% from 18 to 24, 32.3% from 25 to 44, 20.0% from 45 to 64, and 14.2% who were 65 years of age or older. The median age was 37 years. For every 100 females, there were 97.6 males. For every 100 females age 18 and over, there were 93.1 males. The median income for a household in the CDP was $56,855, and the median income for a family was $62,969. Males had a median income of $43,688 versus $27,276 for females. The per capita income for the CDP was $23,985. About 0.8% of families and 1.9% of the population were below the poverty line, including 3.0% of those under age 18 and none of those age 65 or over.

== Education ==
The community is served by the Nazareth Area School District. Students in grades nine through 12 attend Nazareth Area High School in Nazareth.
