= Entlerville, Pennsylvania =

Unincorporated community in Pennsylvania, US

Coordinates: 40°15′45″N 77°20′45″W

- Township
- Map of Cumberland County, Pennsylvania
- Country: United States
- State: Pennsylvania
- County: Cumberland
- Township: Upper Frankford

Government
  - Type: Board of Supervisors
- Time zone: UTC-5 (Eastern (EST))
  - Summer (DST): UTC-4 (EDT)
- Area code: 717

Entlerville is an unincorporated community in Upper Frankford Township, Cumberland County, Pennsylvania, United States. It is located off Pennsylvania Route 944, 2 miles (3 km) northeast of Bloserville and approximately 1.25 miles (2.01 km) south from the end of the road heading towards the McClures Gap on Blue Mountain, the long ridgecrest that forms the northern edge of the Cumberland Valley and of Cumberland County.

The ZIP code in Entlerville is 17241, identified by the U.S. Postal Service as Newville, but that is also shared by several neighboring communities, including Bloserville, Cobblerville, Dickinson Township, Doubling Gap, Greenspring, Hays Grove, Heberlig, Little Wash(ington), Lower Mifflin Township, McCrea, North Newton Township, Upper Frankford Township, and Upper Mifflin Township. Entlerville appears on the US Geological Survey Map entitled Landisburg, at latitude 40.263 and longitude -77.346. Its elevation is 614 feet (187 m) above sea level. US Census data indicated that as of 2007, there were 39 business entities in Entlerville; 29 of those with between one and four employees, seven businesses with 5-10 employees, one with between 10 and nineteen employees, and two that employed between twenty and forty people.
