= Wheatfield Township, Pennsylvania =

Township in Pennsylvania, US

Coordinates: 40°22′00″N 77°06′59″W

- Township
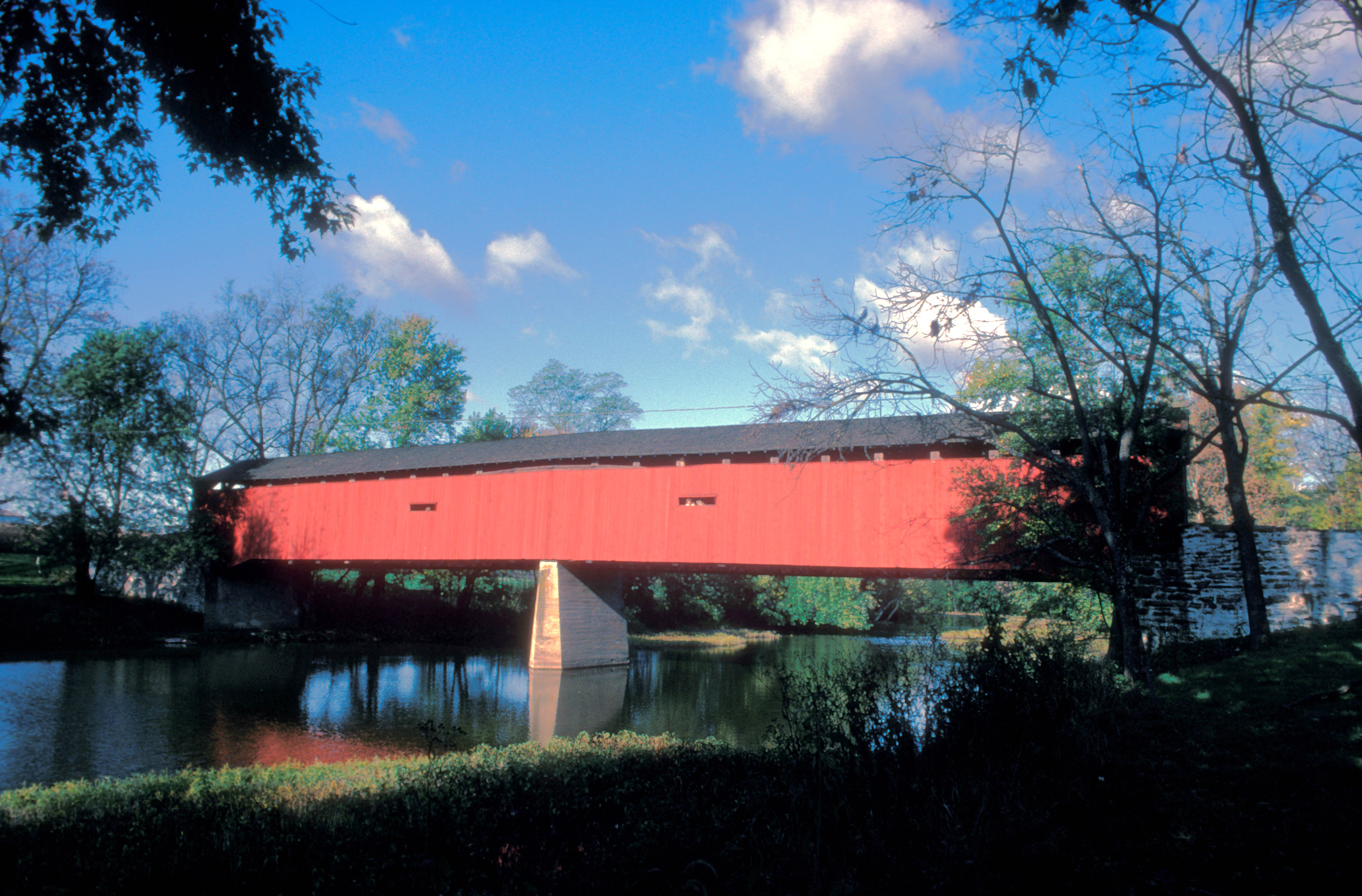
- Dellville Covered Bridge

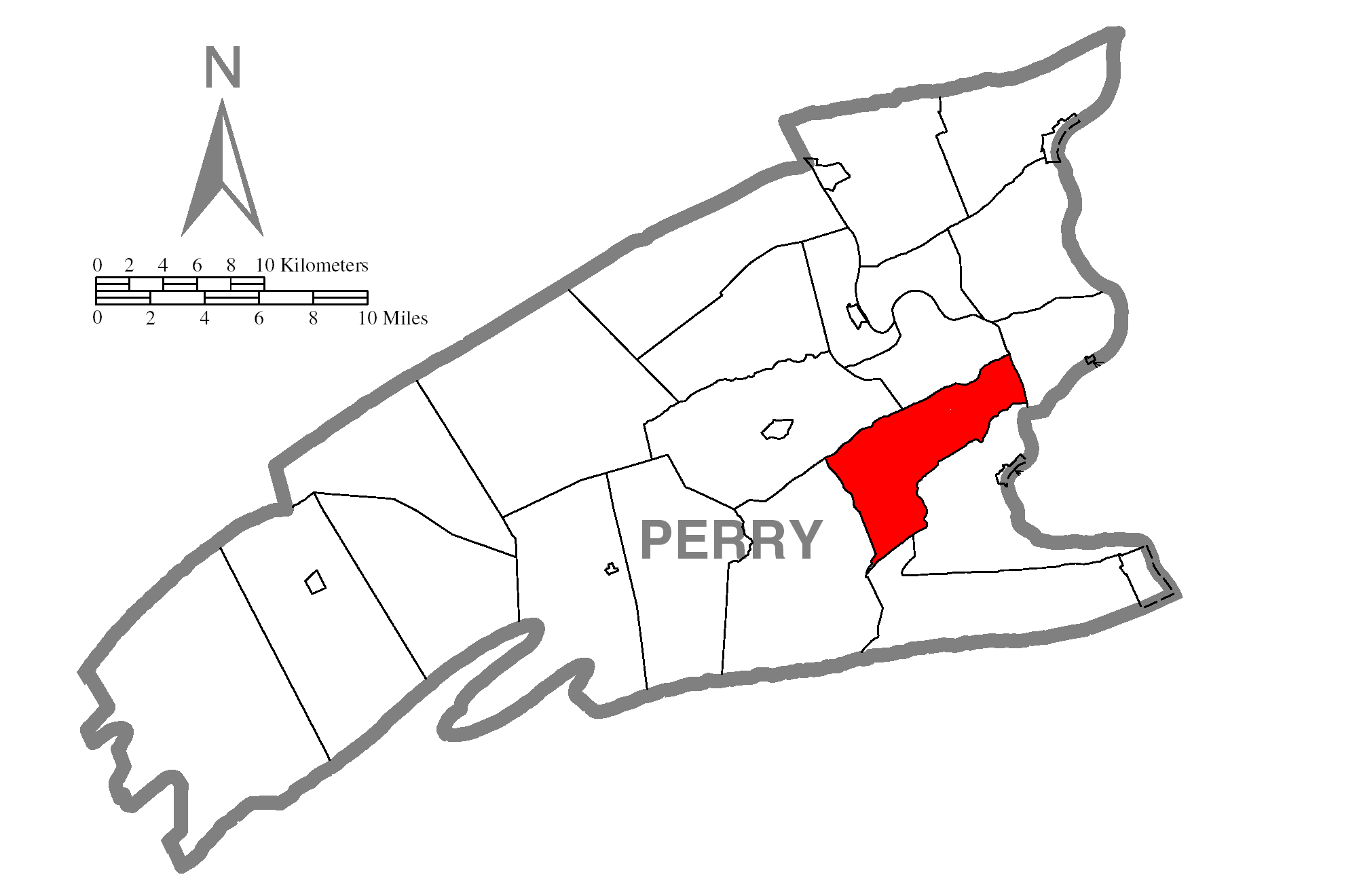
- Map of Perry County, Pennsylvania highlighting Wheatfield Township

- Map of Perry County, Pennsylvania
- Country: United States
- State: Pennsylvania
- County: Perry
- Settled: 1760
- Incorporated: 1826

Area
  - Total: 20.98 sq mi (54.33 km^{2})
  - Land: 20.80 sq mi (53.88 km^{2})
  - Water: 0.17 sq mi (0.45 km^{2})

Population (2020)
  - Total: 3,203 ▼
  - Estimate (2023): 3,203
  - Density: 158.9/sq mi (61.36/km^{2})
- Time zone: UTC-5 (Eastern (EST))
  - Summer (DST): UTC-4 (EDT)
- Area code: 717
- FIPS code: 42-099-84368
- Website: https://wheatfieldtwp.com/

Wheatfield Township is a township in Perry County, Pennsylvania, United States. The population was 3,194 at the 2020 census.

== History ==
The Dellville Covered Bridge was added to the National Register of Historic Places in 1980.

== Geography ==
According to the United States Census Bureau, the township has a total area of 21.1 square miles (54.6 km^{2}), of which, 20.9 square miles (54.2 km^{2}) is land and 0.2 square mile (0.4 km^{2}) (0.76%) is water.

== Demographics ==
Historical population
Census	Pop.	Note	%±
2010	3,334		—
2020	3,203		−3.9%
2023 (est.)	3,203		0.0%
U.S. Decennial Census

As of the census of 2000, there were 3,329 people, 1,206 households, and 943 families residing in the township. The population density was 159.2 inhabitants per square mile (61.5/km^{2}). There were 1,283 housing units at an average density of 61.4 per square mile (23.7/km^{2}). The racial makeup of the township was 99.16% White, 0.12% African American, 0.03% Native American, 0.21% Asian, 0.06% from other races, and 0.42% from two or more races. Hispanic or Latino of any race were 0.72% of the population.

There were 1,206 households, out of which 36.9% had children under the age of 18 living with them, 67.3% were married couples living together, 6.8% had a female householder with no husband present, and 21.8% were non-families. 17.9% of all households were made up of individuals, and 5.1% had someone living alone who was 65 years of age or older. The average household size was 2.75 and the average family size was 3.11.

In the township the population was spread out, with 27.5% under the age of 18, 7.0% from 18 to 24, 32.5% from 25 to 44, 25.3% from 45 to 64, and 7.8% who were 65 years of age or older. The median age was 36 years. For every 100 females there were 102.1 males. For every 100 females age 18 and over, there were 102.4 males.

The median income for a household in the township was $44,010, and the median income for a family was $53,661. Males had a median income of $35,811 versus $26,500 for females. The per capita income for the township was $18,639. About 5.4% of families and 7.7% of the population were below the poverty line, including 9.5% of those under age 18 and 12.5% of those age 65 or over.
