= Dilliner, Pennsylvania =

Unincorporated community in Pennsylvania, US

- Unincorporated community
- Location within Pennsylvania
- Coordinates: 39°45′06″N 79°55′30″W
- Country: United States
- State: Pennsylvania
- County: Greene
- Elevation: 817 ft (249 m)
- Time zone: UTC-5 (Eastern (EST))
  - Summer (DST): UTC-4 (EDT)
- ZIP code: 15327
- Area codes: 724, 878
- GNIS feature ID: 1205037

Dilliner is an unincorporated community in Greene County, Pennsylvania, United States. The community is located along the Monongahela River and Pennsylvania Route 88, 1.7 miles (2.7 km) northwest of Point Marion. Dilliner has a post office with ZIP code 15327.
