= East Marianna, Pennsylvania =

- Unincorporated community Census designated place
- Location within Pennsylvania Location within the United States
- Coordinates: 40°1′19.2″N 80°5′27.6″W
- Country: United States
- State: Pennsylvania
- County: Washington
- Township: West Bethlehem

Area
  - Total: 0.187 sq mi (0.48 km^{2})
  - Land: 0.187 sq mi (0.48 km^{2})
  - Water: 0 sq mi (0 km^{2})
- Time zone: UTC-5 (Eastern (EST))
  - Summer (DST): UTC-4 (EDT)
- FIPS code: 42-21472
- GNIS feature ID: 2830779

East Marianna is an unincorporated community and census designated place (CDP) in West Bethlehem Township, Washington County, Pennsylvania.

== Demographics ==
Historical population
Census	Pop.	Note	%±
U.S. Decennial Census

The United States Census Bureau first defined East Marianna as a census designated place in 2023.
