= East Millsboro, Pennsylvania =

Unincorporated community in Pennsylvania, US

- Unincorporated community
- Location within Pennsylvania
- Coordinates: 39°58′52″N 79°59′36″W
- Country: United States
- State: Pennsylvania
- County: Fayette
- Elevation: 781 ft (238 m)
- Time zone: UTC-5 (Eastern (EST))
  - Summer (DST): UTC-4 (EDT)
- ZIP code: 15433
- Area codes: 724, 878
- GNIS feature ID: 1173843

East Millsboro is an unincorporated community in Fayette County, Pennsylvania, United States. The community is located on the east bank of the Monongahela River, across from Millsboro. East Millsboro has a post office with the ZIP code 15433.
