= Shermans Creek (Pennsylvania) =

Tributary creek in Pennsylvania, US

Coordinates: 40°23′01″N 77°01′41″W

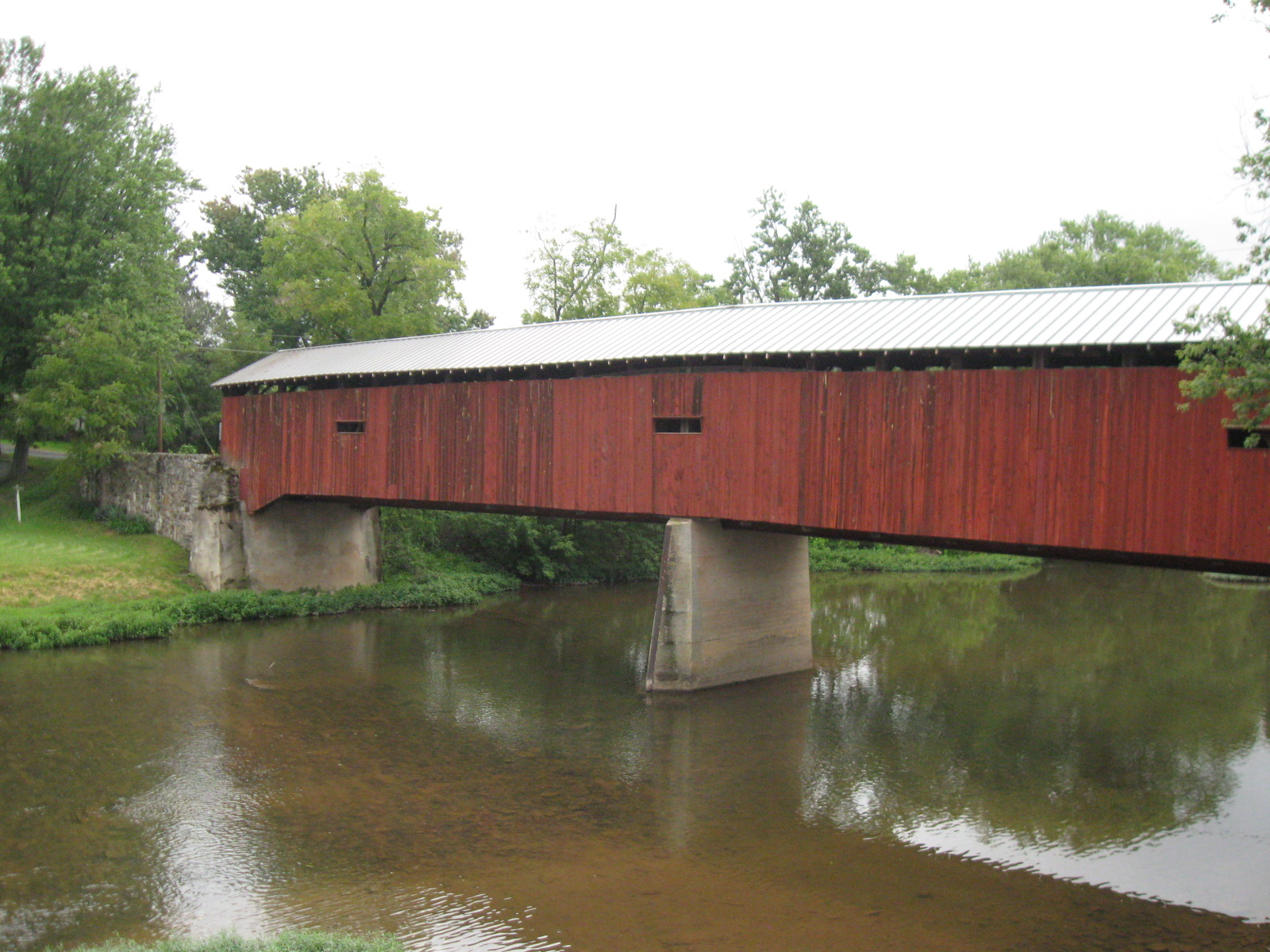
Dellville Covered Bridge over Shermans Creek

Shermans Creek is a 53.4-mile-long (85.9 km) tributary of the Susquehanna River in Perry County, Pennsylvania.

Shermans Creek joins the Susquehanna River just downstream of Duncannon. As of April 2010, the United States Geological Survey Geographic Names Information System made the decision to modify the name to be "Shermans Creek", prior to that date the creek was referred to as "Sherman Creek" by the United States Geological Survey. In some cases it can be found referred to as "Sherman's Creek" with an apostrophe although most locals refer to it as Shermans Creek.

Shermans Creek is purported to be named after a Native American fur trader who lived near and drowned crossing the creek on horseback.

== Bridges ==
- Book's Covered Bridge
- Dellville Covered Bridge

== See also ==
- List of rivers of Pennsylvania
