= Dean Township, Pennsylvania =

Township in Pennsylvania, US

- Township
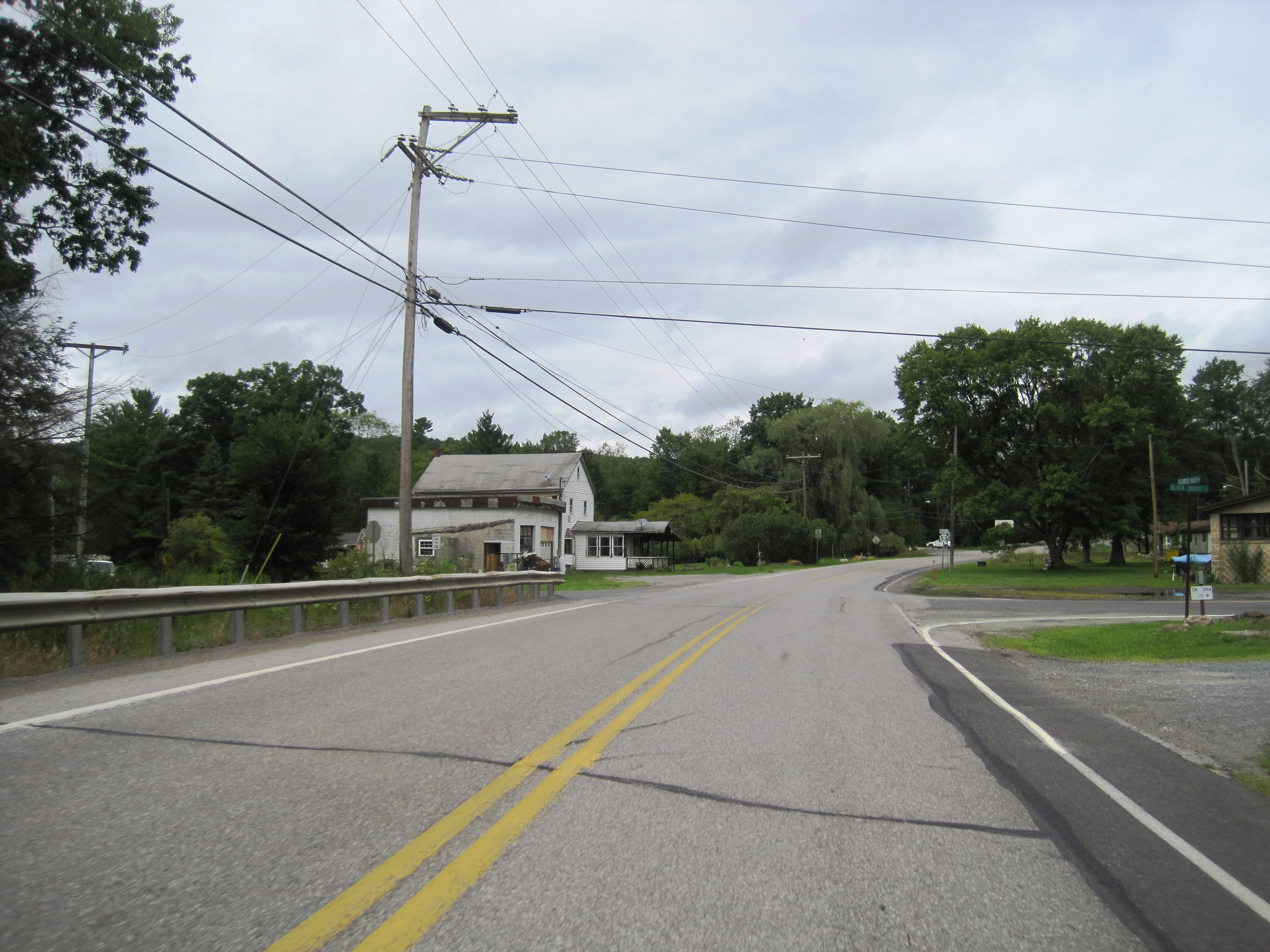
- PA 53 in the village of Dysart within the township

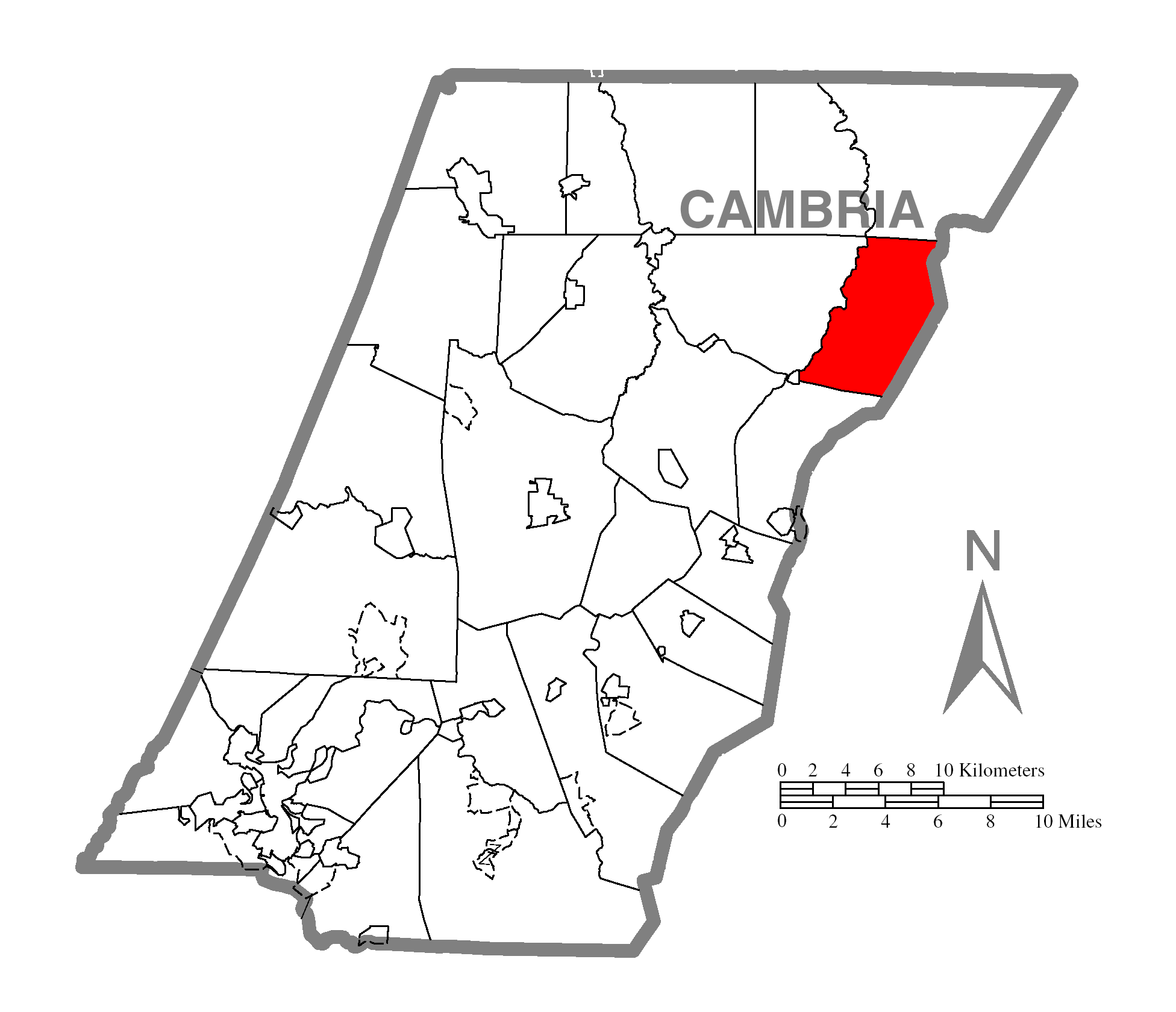
- Map of Cambria County, Pennsylvania highlighting Dean Township

- Map of Cambria County, Pennsylvania
- Country: United States
- State: Pennsylvania
- County: Cambria
- Incorporated: 1877

Area
  - Total: 20.97 sq mi (54.30 km^{2})
  - Land: 20.97 sq mi (54.30 km^{2})
  - Water: 0 sq mi (0.00 km^{2})

Population (2020)
  - Total: 328
  - Density: 15.6/sq mi (6.04/km^{2})
- Time zone: UTC-5 (Eastern (EST))
  - Summer (DST): UTC-4 (EDT)
- Area code: 814
- FIPS code: 4202118432
- GNIS feature ID: ID

Dean Township is a township in Cambria County, Pennsylvania, United States. The population was 328 at the 2020 census, down from 391 at the 2010 census. It is part of the Johnstown, Pennsylvania Metropolitan Statistical Area despite being much closer to Altoona.

== Geography ==
Dean Township is located in northeastern Cambria County at 40.59° N by 78.47°W, approximately 19 miles (31 km) northeast of Ebensburg, the Cambria County seat, and 12 miles (19 km) northwest of Altoona. The township is bordered by Blair County to the east. The western border of the township follows Clearfield Creek, a northward-flowing tributary of the West Branch Susquehanna River. Pennsylvania Route 53 runs through the western side of the township, following Clearfield Creek, leading southwest to Ashville and north to Coalport. Unincorporated communities in the township include Dean in the northwest and Dysart in the west, both along Clearfield Creek and PA 53.

According to the United States Census Bureau, the township has a total area of 20.8 square miles (54.0 km^{2}), all land.

== Communities ==
=== Unincorporated communities ===
- Condron
- Daugherty
- Dean
- Dysart
- Tippletown

== Demographics ==
Historical population
Census	Pop.	Note	%±
2000	408		—
2010	391		−4.2%
2020	328		−16.1%
U.S. Decennial Census

As of the census of 2000, there were 408 people, 165 households, and 124 families residing in the township. The population density was 19.7 people per square mile (7.6/km^{2}). There were 186 housing units at an average density of 9.0/sq mi (3.5/km^{2}). The racial makeup of the township was 98.77% White, and 1.23% from two or more races.

There were 165 households, out of which 21.8% had children under the age of 18 living with them, 60.6% were married couples living together, 8.5% had a female householder with no husband present, and 24.8% were non-families. 23.6% of all households were made up of individuals, and 11.5% had someone living alone who was 65 years of age or older. The average household size was 2.47 and the average family size was 2.92.

In the township the population was spread out, with 17.4% under the age of 18, 9.3% from 18 to 24, 28.9% from 25 to 44, 24.8% from 45 to 64, and 19.6% who were 65 years of age or older. The median age was 41 years. For every 100 females there were 102.0 males. For every 100 females age 18 and over, there were 94.8 males.

The median income for a household in the township was $30,313, and the median income for a family was $34,167. Males had a median income of $30,500 versus $21,875 for females. The per capita income for the township was $14,141. About 6.0% of families and 10.4% of the population were below the poverty line, including 18.2% of those under age 18 and 5.3% of those age 65 or over.

== Recreation ==
Portions of Pennsylvania State Game Lands Number 108 are located at the eastern end of the township.
