= Pennsylvania House of Representatives, District 199 =

American legislative district

Pennsylvania's 199th State House of Representatives district
Representative
Barbara Gleim; R–Middlesex Township

The 199th Pennsylvania House of Representatives District is located in Cumberland County and includes the following areas:

- Carlisle
- Newburg
- Newville
- Hopewell Township
- Lower Frankford Township
- Lower Mifflin Township
- Middlesex Township
- North Middleton Township
- North Newton Township
- South Middleton Township (PART, Precincts 03, 04, and 05)
- Upper Frankford Township
- Upper Mifflin Township
- West Pennsboro Township

== Representatives ==
Representative	Party	Hometown	Term	Electoral history
Prior to 1969, seats were apportioned by county.
John H. Hamilton, Jr.	Republican		1969 – 1978	
Joe Rocks	Republican	Philadelphia	1979 – 1981	
District moved from Philadelphia County to Adams, Cumberland, & York Counties after 1982
John Broujos	Democratic		1983 – 1992	
District adjusted to Cumberland & York Counties after 1992
Albert Masland	Republican		1993 – 2000	
Will Gabig	Republican	Carlisle	2001 – 2010	
2000 United States census: 2002 – 2013 Part of Cumberland County Townships of Cooke, Dickinson, Hopewell, Lower Frankford, Lower Mifflin, Middlesex, North Middleton, North Newton, Penn, South Newton, Upper Frankford, Upper Mifflin, West Pennsboro Boroughs of Carlisle, Newburg, Newville Total population: 61,616
Will Gabig	Republican	Carlisle	2001 – 2010	Retained seat after redistricting; Did not seek re-election in 2010
Stephen Bloom	Republican	North Middleton Township	2011 – present	Incumbent
2010 United States census: 2014 – 2022 Part of Cumberland County Townships of Dickinson, Lower Frankford, Lower Mifflin, Middlesex, North Middleton, Silver Spring (PART, Precincts 05, 06, 08, and 09), Upper Frankford, Upper Mifflin, West Pennsboro Boroughs of Carlisle, Newville Total population: 62,329
Stephen Bloom	Republican	North Middleton Township	2011 – 2018	
Barbara Gleim	Republican	Middlesex Township	2019 – present	Incumbent

== Recent election results ==
PA House election, 2022: Pennsylvania House, District 199
Party	Candidate	Votes	%
Republican	Barb Gleim (incumbent)	16,230	61.45
Democratic	Robert Alan Howe	10,181	38.55
Total votes		26,411	100.00
Republican hold			

PA House election, 2020: Pennsylvania House, District 199
Party	Candidate	Votes	%
Republican	Barb Gleim (incumbent)	21,678	63.56
Democratic	Janelle Kayla Crossley	12,431	36.44
Total votes		34,109	100.00
Republican hold			

PA House election, 2018: Pennsylvania House, District 199
Party	Candidate	Votes	%
Republican	Barb Gleim	14,747	58.84
Democratic	Sherwood McGinnis, Jr.	9,883	39.43
Libertarian	Charles Boust	433	1.73
Total votes		25,063	100.00
Republican hold			

PA House election, 2016: Pennsylvania House, District 199
Party	Candidate	Votes	%
Republican	Stephen Bloom (incumbent)	19,064	64.27
Democratic	Jill Bartoli	10,598	35.73
Total votes		29,662	100.00
Republican hold			

PA House election, 2014: Pennsylvania House, District 199
Party	Candidate	Votes	%
Republican	Stephen Bloom (incumbent)	11,368	64.81
Democratic	Jill Bartoli	6,172	35.19
Total votes		17,540	100.00
Republican hold			

PA House election, 2012: Pennsylvania House, District 199
Party	Candidate	Votes	%
Republican	Stephen Bloom (incumbent)	Unopposed	
Total votes		21,567	100.00
Republican hold			

PA House election, 2010: Pennsylvania House, District 199
Party	Candidate	Votes	%
Republican	Stephen Bloom	13,450	67.69
Democratic	Fred Baldwin	6,421	32.31
Total votes		19,871	100.00
Republican hold			
