= John H. Hamilton =

John H. Hamilton may refer to:

- John H. Hamilton Jr. (1919–1986), member of the Pennsylvania House of Representatives
- J. H. Hamilton, Negro league infielder in the 1920s

== See also ==
- John Hamilton (disambiguation)
