= John Hamilton =

John, Johnny, or Jon Hamilton may refer to:

== Arts and entertainment ==
- John Hamilton (painter) (fl. 1765–1786), British painter
- John R. Hamilton (architect) (fl. 1840–1870), English architect
- John McLure Hamilton (1853–1936), Anglo-American artist
- John Hamilton (actor) (1887–1958), American actor
- John F. Hamilton (1893–1967), American actor
- John "Bugs" Hamilton (1911–1947), American trumpeter
- John Hamilton (artist) (1919–1993), British army officer and artist
- John R. Hamilton (photographer) (1923–1997), American photographer
- John T. Hamilton (born 1963), American literary scholar and musician
- Sterling Hayden (1916–1986), American actor who operated under the code name "John Hamilton" as an agent for the Office of Strategic Services in World War II

== Military ==
- John Hamilton (Jacobite) (1651/52–1691), Irish military officer in the Williamite War in Ireland
- John Hamilton (Royal Navy officer) (1714–1755), British naval officer
- John Hamilton (British Army officer) (1724–1802), who served in North America
- John Hamilton (American Revolution) (died 1816), Loyalist military officer in the American Revolutionary War
- Sir John Hamilton, 1st Baronet, of Woodbrook (1755–1835), British and Portuguese general of the Napoleonic Wars
- John Fane Charles Hamilton (1829–1864), British naval officer, after whom the town of Hamilton in New Zealand is named
- John Patrick Hamilton (1896–1961), Australian recipient of the Victoria Cross
- John Brown Hamilton (1896–1973), Scottish recipient of the Victoria Cross
- John Graham Hamilton (1910–1994), British admiral
- John Hamilton (RNZAF officer) (fl. 1971–2006), former Chief of the Royal New Zealand Air Force

== Nobility ==
- John Hamilton of Cadzow, 4th Laird of Cadzow (before 1370 – c. 1402) Scottish nobleman and soldier
- John Hamilton, 1st Marquess of Hamilton (c. 1535–1604), Scottish nobleman
- John Hamilton, 1st Lord Bargany (died 1658), Scottish peer
- John Hamilton, 4th Earl of Haddington (1626–1669), Scottish nobleman
- John Hamilton, 1st Lord Belhaven and Stenton (died 1679), Scottish peer
- John Hamilton, 2nd Lord Bargany (c. 1640–1693), Scottish peer and soldier
- John Hamilton, 2nd Lord Belhaven and Stenton (1656–1708), Scottish politician and critic of the 1707 Acts of Union
- John Hamilton, 1st Marquess of Abercorn (1756–1818), Scottish nobleman
- John Hamilton, 1st Baron Hamilton of Dalzell (1829–1900), Scottish soldier and politician
- John Hamilton, 1st Viscount Sumner (1859–1934), British law lord
- John d'Henin Hamilton, 3rd Baron Hamilton of Dalzell (1911–1990), Lord Lieutenant of Surrey

== Politics ==
=== Canada ===
- John Hamilton (Ontario politician) (1802–1882), Canadian Senator representing Ontario
- John Robinson Hamilton (1808–1870), Canadian lawyer and political figure in Quebec
- John Hamilton (Quebec politician) (1827–1888), Canadian Senator representing Quebec
- John Claude Hamilton (1854–?), Canadian politician
- John Borden Hamilton (1913–2005), Canadian lawyer and politician

=== U.K. ===
- John Hamilton (1656–1713), MP for Dungannon and Augher
- John Hamilton (Donegal MP), MP for St Johnstown and Donegal
- John Hamilton (Wendover MP) (1685–1757), English MP for Wendover
- John Hamilton (died 1757), MP for Dundalk and Carlow
- John Hamilton (1715–1796), Scottish politician, MP for Wigtown Burghs and Wigtownshire
- John Hamilton (1751–1804), Scottish politician, MP for Haddingtonshire
- John Hamilton (Liverpool) (1922–2006), Leader of Liverpool City Council 1983–1986

=== U.S. ===
- John Hamilton (New Jersey politician) (c. 1681–1747), American politician
- John Hamilton (Pennsylvania politician) (1754–1837), American politician and Pennsylvania Congressman
- John Taylor Hamilton (1843–1925), US Representative from Iowa
- John Marshall Hamilton (1847–1905), governor of Illinois
- John M. Hamilton (1855–1916), US Representative from West Virginia
- John Hamilton (Kansas politician) (1892–1973), American politician and chairman of the Republican National Committee
- John H. Hamilton Jr. (1919–1986), Pennsylvania politician
- John D. Hamilton (born 1950), American politician and former Rhode Island state representative

=== Other political figures ===
- John Hamilton (Tasmanian politician) (1834–1924), member of Tasmanian House of Assembly 1891–1903
- John Hamilton (Queensland politician) (1841–1916), member of the Queensland Legislative Assembly
- John Ronald Hamilton (1871–1940), New Zealand politician

== Religion ==
- John Hamilton (archbishop of St Andrews) (1512–1571), Scottish politician, Archbishop of St Andrews, Keeper of the Privy Seal
- John Hamilton (controversialist) (1547–1611), Scottish Catholic controversialist
- John Hamilton of Blair (born c. 1640), 17th century Church of Scotland minister and bishop
- John Hamilton (priest) (died 1756), Irish Anglican priest
- John William Hamilton (1845–1934), American, Bishop of the Methodist Episcopal Church
- John Agar-Hamilton (1895-1984), South African Anglican priest

== Sports ==
=== Association football ===
- John Hamilton (footballer, born 1876) (1876–1947), Scottish footballer for FC Barcelona
- John Hamilton (footballer, born 1880) (1880–?), Scottish footballer for West Ham United
- Johnny Hamilton (footballer, born 1935) (1935–2013), Scottish footballer for Heart of Midlothian
- Johnny Hamilton (footballer, born 1949) (1949–2015), Scottish footballer for Hibernian and Rangers
- Jock Hamilton (A. John Hamilton, 1869–1931), Scottish footballer for Ayr, Wolverhampton Wanderers, Loughborough, Bristol City, Leicester Fosse, Watford, Wellingborough & Fulham
- Jock Hamilton (footballer, born 1879) (John H. Hamilton, 1879–1925), Scottish footballer for Leith Athletic, Leeds City and Brentford, among others

=== Other sports ===
- John Hamilton (cricketer) (1855–1904), English cricketer
- John Hamilton (footballer, born 1891) (1891–1964), Australian rules footballer for Fitzroy
- J. H. Hamilton (John H. Hamilton), Negro league infielder in the 1920s
- J. C. Hamilton (John C. Hamilton, 1913–1991), Negro league baseball player in the 1940s
- John Hamilton (footballer, born 1946) (1946–2007), Australian rules footballer for Melbourne
- Johnny Hamilton (basketball) (born 1994), Trinidadian basketball player

== Others ==
- John Hamilton (architect) (1761–1812), architect and builder in Edinburgh's First New Town, uncle of Thomas Hamilton
- John Church Hamilton (1792–1882), son of the American founding father Alexander Hamilton
- John B. Hamilton (1847–1898), U.S. Surgeon General
- John Hamilton (university chancellor) (1851–1939), Quebec merchant and chancellor of Bishop's University, Lennoxville, Quebec
- John Hamilton (farmer) (fl. 1888–1930), Scottish sheep farming pioneer in Patagonia and landowner in the Falkland Islands
- John Hamilton (gangster) (1899–1934), Canadian murderer and bank-robber and associate of John Dillinger
- John Randle Hamilton (born 1944), American diplomat
- John Maxwell Hamilton (born 1947), journalist, civil servant and educator
- John Hamilton (judge), judge of the Supreme Court of New South Wales, Australia, 1997–2009
- Jon Hamilton, scientist and NPR correspondent

== See also ==
- Jack Hamilton (disambiguation)
- Hamilton House (South Berwick, Maine)
