= Gardners, Pennsylvania =

Unincorporated community in Pennsylvania, US

- Census-designated place
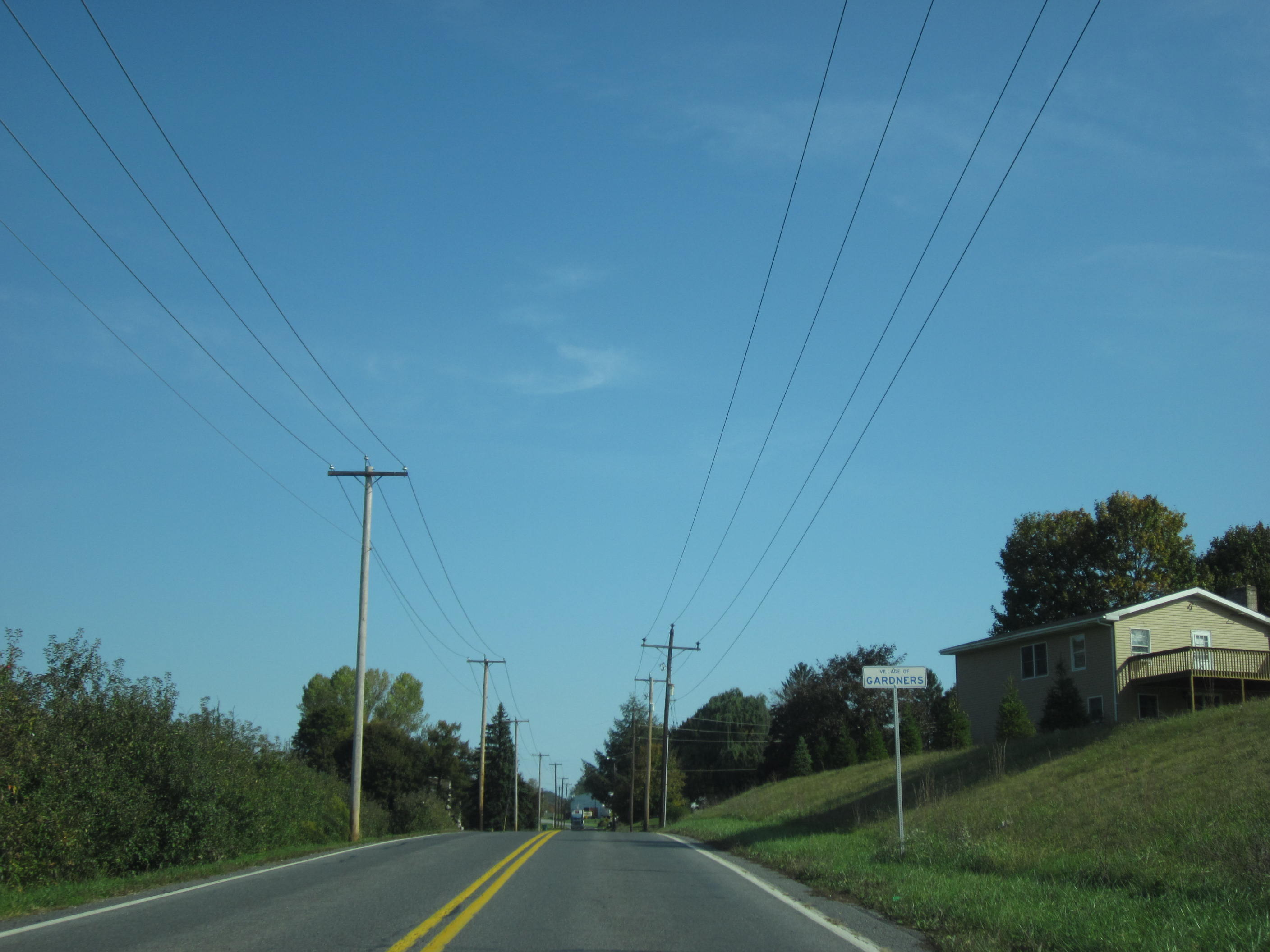
- PA 34 northbound entering Gardners
- Nickname: Hunters Run
- Location in Adams County and the state of Pennsylvania.
- Coordinates: 40°00′20″N 77°12′25″W
- Country: United States
- State: Pennsylvania
- County: Adams and Cumberland
- Township: Tyrone and Dickinson

Area
  - Total: 0.46 sq mi (1.20 km^{2})
  - Land: 0.46 sq mi (1.20 km^{2})
  - Water: 0 sq mi (0.00 km^{2})
- Elevation: 866 ft (264 m)

Population (2020)
  - Total: 138
  - Density: 296.6/sq mi (114.52/km^{2})
- Time zone: UTC-5 (Eastern (EST))
  - Summer (DST): UTC-4 (EDT)
- Zip code: 17324
- Area code: 717
- GNIS feature ID: 1175444
- FIPS Code: 42-28488

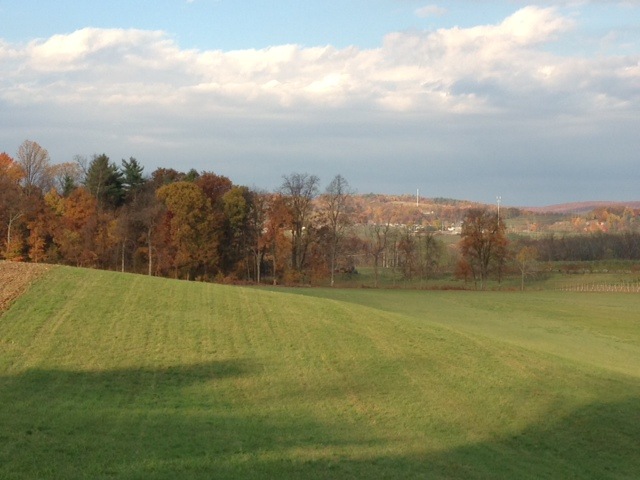
Fall scene

Gardners is a village in Adams County, Pennsylvania and a census-designated place that includes portions of Adams and Cumberland counties in Pennsylvania, United States. The village of Gardners is located off Pennsylvania Route 34, in Tyrone Township, in northern Adams County. As of the 2020 census, the population of the village of Gardners was 137. The zip code for the United States Post Office in the village of Gardners is 17325. This zip code covers surrounding villages and areas in Adams and Cumberland counties, including Goodyear, Hunter's Run, Idaville, Pine Grove Furnace State Park, and Uriah.

== Demographics ==
Historical population
Census	Pop.	Note	%±
2020	137		—
U.S. Decennial Census

== History ==
The village of Gardners was originally known as Gardner's Station. In the 1886 it was described as "a modern railroad town on the Gettysburg & Harrisburg Railroad" and a "shipping point for the southern settlements of Huntington and Tyrone Townships". In the intervening years, the rail line was operated by the Reading Railroad and Penn Central Railroad, and currently is operated by the Gettysburg and Northern Railroad. The surrounding area is known for its apple and other fruit orchards.

In 1912 a food processing plant was built in Gardners by C.H. Musselman as a second processing plant for the Musselman Company, which he started in Biglerville in 1907. The Gardners plant began processing apples in the fall of 1913. During World War I the plants at Biglerville and Gardners managed to maintain a steady flow of canned fruit despite labor, fuel and transportation shortages. During the 1960s, the company became part of the Pet Milk Company, which subsequently changed its name to Pet, Inc. In 1978 the company was acquired by IC Industries (ICI) and in 1981 ICI sold off the Musselman division to private owners from Vineland, New Jersey. They sold Musselman's to its currently owners, Knouse Foods, a growers' cooperative, in 1984. Before it was closed in 2018, and subsequently razed, this 148,183 sq.ft. plant covering 471 acres employed approximately 150 who packed apple juice and apple sauce in a variety of sizes under the Lucky Leaf and Musselman labels. Today Knouse Foods maintains a warehouse at the site.

Zeigler Brothers, which was founded in 1935 as a local producer of poultry and livestock feeds, operates a manufacturing facility and maintains its headquarters in the village of Gardners. The company develops and manufactures over 300 products and exports to over 50 countries around the world. In addition to its facilities in Gardners, the company has another manufacturing facility in south-central Pennsylvania and two franchises located in Mexico. In the 1960s, there was a major fire that destroyed the feed mill in Gardners.

== Education ==
The entire census-designated place is in the Upper Adams School District. Residents of the census-designated place of Gardners and surrounding areas may attend elementary school in Bendersville and the middle school and high school in Biglerville. These schools' teams are known as "the Canners".

Nearby residents outside of the Upper Adams School District's boundaries attend schools in the Bermudian Springs School District, the South Middleton School District, or the Carlisle Area School District.
