= Barbara Gleim =

American politician

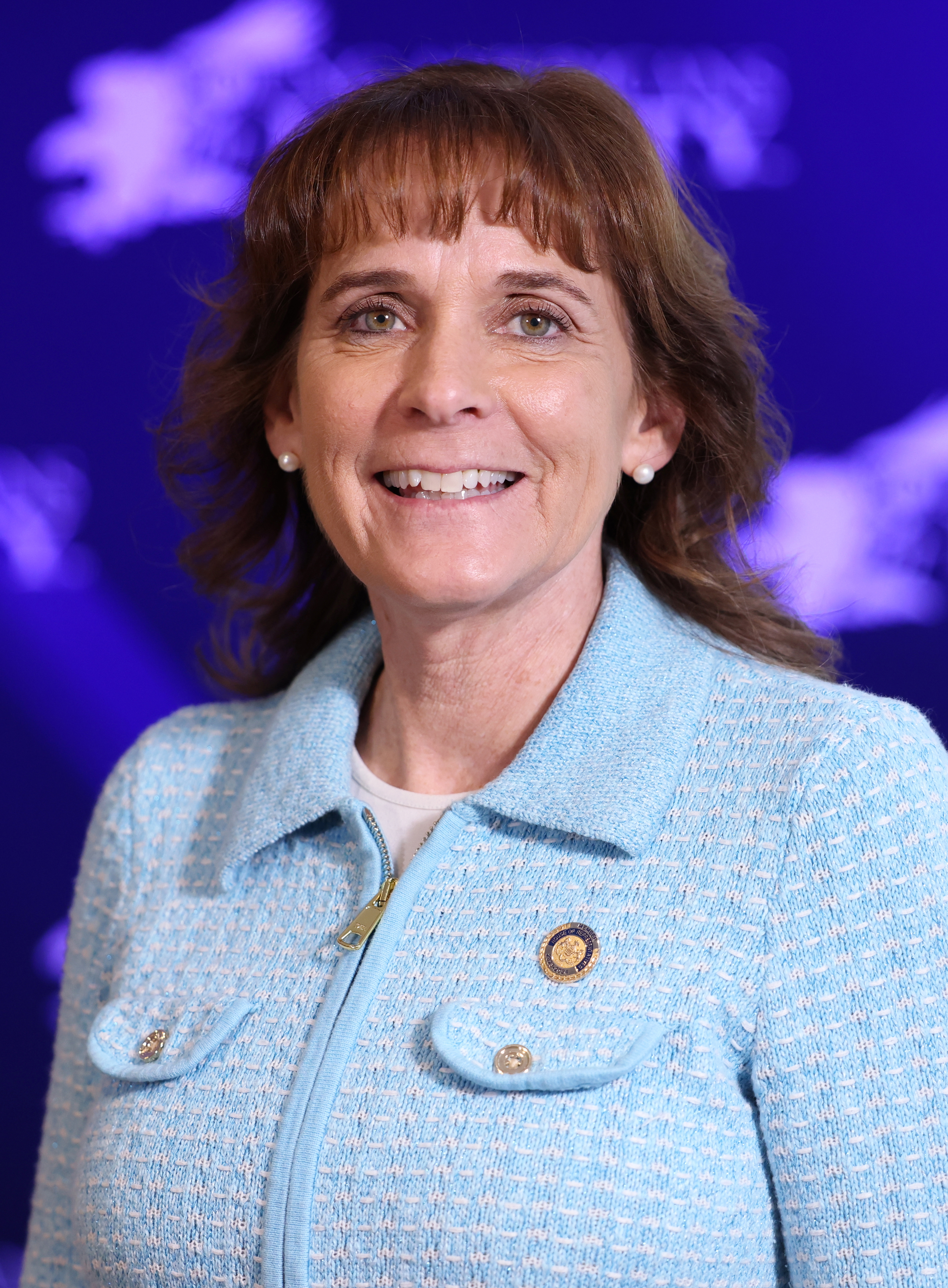
- Gleim at the 2024 Hazlitt Summit hosted by Young Americans for Liberty Foundation

Member of the Pennsylvania House of Representatives from the 199th district
- Incumbent
- Assumed office January 1, 2019
- Preceded by: Stephen Bloom

Personal details
- Born: May 20, 1964 (age 62) Lanham, Maryland, U.S.
- Party: Republican
- Spouse: Tracey
- Children: 3
- Education: University of Maryland (BA); Delaware Valley University (MBA)
- Alma mater: Glenelg High School
- Website: Campaign website

Barbara Gleim (born May 20, 1964) is an American politician. A Republican, she is a member of the Pennsylvania House of Representatives from the 199th District.

== Early life and education ==
Gleim was born on May 20, 1964, in Lanham, Maryland. She graduated from Glenelg High School in 1982. In 1985, Gleim earned a Bachelor of Arts degree in political science from the University of Maryland. She earned a Master's in Business Administration degree in food and agribusiness from Delaware Valley University in 2009.

== Political career ==
Gleim served on the Cumberland Valley School District school board for eight years, two of which she served as president of the board.

Gleim was elected to represent the 199th District in the Pennsylvania House of Representatives in 2018. She won re-election in 2020 and 2022.

In 2020, Gleim was among 26 Pennsylvania House Republicans who called for the reversal of Joe Biden's certification as the winner of Pennsylvania's electoral votes in the 2020 United States presidential election, citing false claims of election irregularities.

She is a member of the Pennsylvania Freedom Caucus.

== Personal life ==
Gleim lives in Middlesex Township, Cumberland County, Pennsylvania, with husband Tracey. They have three adult children.
