= Lower Frankford Township, Pennsylvania =

Township in Pennsylvania, US

Coordinates: 40°14′00″N 77°15′59″W

- Township
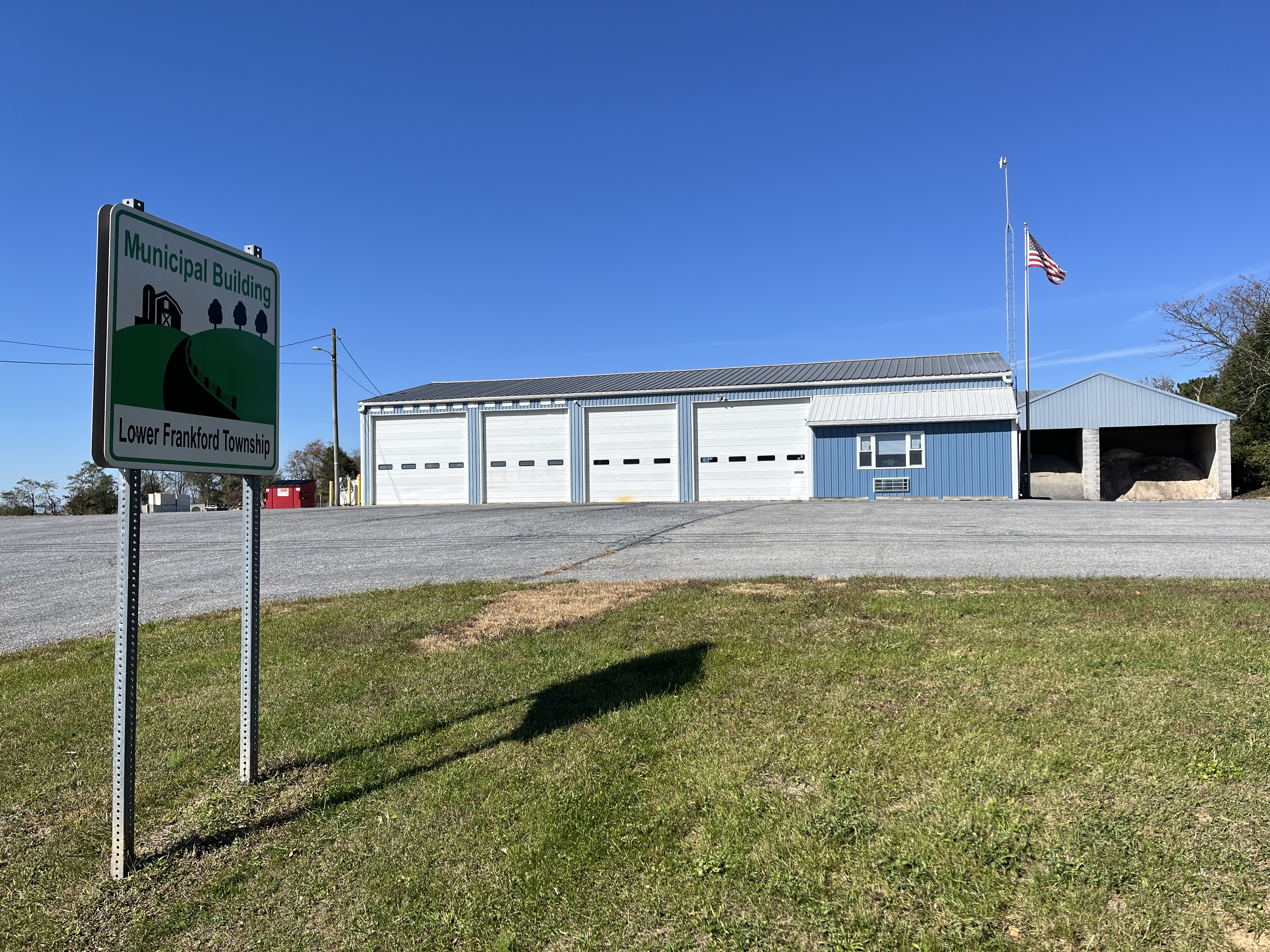
- Municipal Building

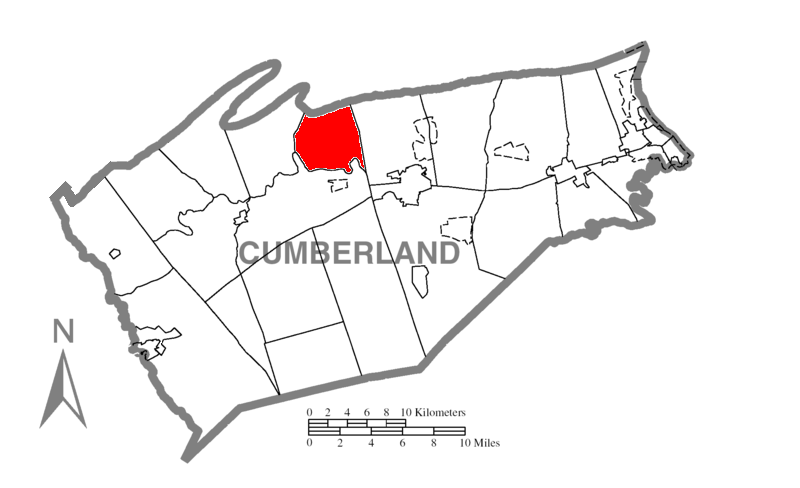
- Map of Cumberland County, Pennsylvania highlighting Lower Frankford Township

- Map of Cumberland County, Pennsylvania
- Country: United States
- State: Pennsylvania
- County: Cumberland

Government
  - Type: Board of Supervisors

Area
  - Total: 15.00 sq mi (38.84 km^{2})
  - Land: 14.68 sq mi (38.02 km^{2})
  - Water: 0.32 sq mi (0.82 km^{2})

Population (2010)
  - Total: 1,732
  - Estimate (2016): 1,795
  - Density: 122.3/sq mi (47.21/km^{2})
- Time zone: UTC-5 (Eastern (EST))
  - Summer (DST): UTC-4 (EDT)
- Area code: 717
- FIPS code: 42-041-44904
- Website: http://www.lowerfrankfordtownship.com/

Historical population
| Census | Pop. | Note | %± |
|---|---|---|---|
| 2000 | 1,823 | | — |
| 2010 | 1,732 | | −5.0% |
| 2016 (est.) | 1,795 | | 3.6% |
U.S. Decennial Census

Lower Frankford Township is a township in Cumberland County, Pennsylvania, United States. The population was 1,732 at the 2010 census.

== Geography ==
The township is in north-central Cumberland County, bordered to the north by Perry County along the crest of Blue Mountain, the northern edge of the Cumberland Valley.

The western border is Upper Frankford Township, a sister township caused by the 1921 split of old Frankford Township. The twin townships' southern border with West Pennsboro Township was created in April 1795 by the County Court and follows Conodoguinet Creek, a tributary of the Susquehanna River.

North Middleton Township is the eastern border of the township.

According to the United States Census Bureau, the township has a total area of 15.0 square miles (38.8 km^{2}), of which 14.7 square miles (38.0 km^{2}) is land and 0.3 square miles (0.8 km^{2}), or 2.12%, is water.

== Demographics ==
As of the census of 2000, there were 1,823 people, 683 households, and 549 families residing in the township. The population density was 121.9 inhabitants per square mile (47.1/km^{2}). There were 707 housing units at an average density of 47.3 units per square mile (18.3 units/km^{2}). The racial makeup of the township was 98.57% White, 0.66% Native American, 0.11% Asian, 0.22% from other races, and 0.44% from two or more races. Hispanic or Latino of any race were 0.93% of the population.

There were 683 households, out of which 36.7% had children under the age of 18 living with them, 65.9% were married couples living together, 9.4% had a female householder with no husband present, and 19.6% were non-families. 14.9% of all households were made up of individuals, and 4.8% had someone living alone who was 65 years of age or older. The average household size was 2.67 and the average family size was 2.93.

In the township the population was spread out, with 26.5% under the age of 18, 6.4% from 18 to 24, 30.0% from 25 to 44, 27.4% from 45 to 64, and 9.7% who were 65 years of age or older. The median age was 38 years. For every 100 females, there were 103.2 males. For every 100 females age 18 and over, there were 101.1 males.

The median income for a household in the township was $42,400, and the median income for a family was $46,394. Males had a median income of $35,278 versus $24,856 for females. The per capita income for the township was $18,891. About 6.2% of families and 7.3% of the population were below the poverty line, including 10.8% of those under age 18 and 11.7% of those age 65 or over.
