= Carlisle Barracks =

- Carlisle, Pennsylvania
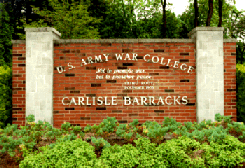
- US Army War College

Site information
- Type: School post
- Controlled by: Headquarters, Department of the Army

Site history
- Built: May 1757
- In use: Currently

Pennsylvania Historical Marker
- Designated: N/A

Carlisle Barracks is a United States Army facility located in Pennsylvania, with a Carlisle post office address and with a portion in Carlisle, Pennsylvania. The site of the U.S. Army War College, it is the nation's second-oldest active military base. The first structures were built in 1757, during the French and Indian War between Great Britain and France in the colonies.

From 1879 to 1918, the property was transferred to the Department of Interior to operate the Carlisle Indian Industrial School. This was the first off-reservation boarding school established to educate and assimilate Native American children into European-American culture. In 1891 Congress passed legislation to expand this program. After the United States entered World War I, the school was closed and the property was transferred back to the War Department.

== History ==
=== 1756—1860 ===
Developed at the intersection of Indian trails along Letort Creek, in the eighteenth century the town of Carlisle became the jumping-off point for traders and settlers heading over the Alleghenies on their way west. A brief 1756 encampment at Carlisle preceded the more permanent Carlisle Fort, built in 1757, during the French and Indian War on the North American front between the colonies of Britain and France. Colonel John Stanwix marched upstream with British regulars and provincials against the backdrop of the international Seven Years' War, building extensive entrenchments in Carlisle. After the American Revolutionary War, from 1783 to 1837, the town of Carlisle was significant as the frontier gateway, as a greatly increased wave of land-hungry migrants moved west.

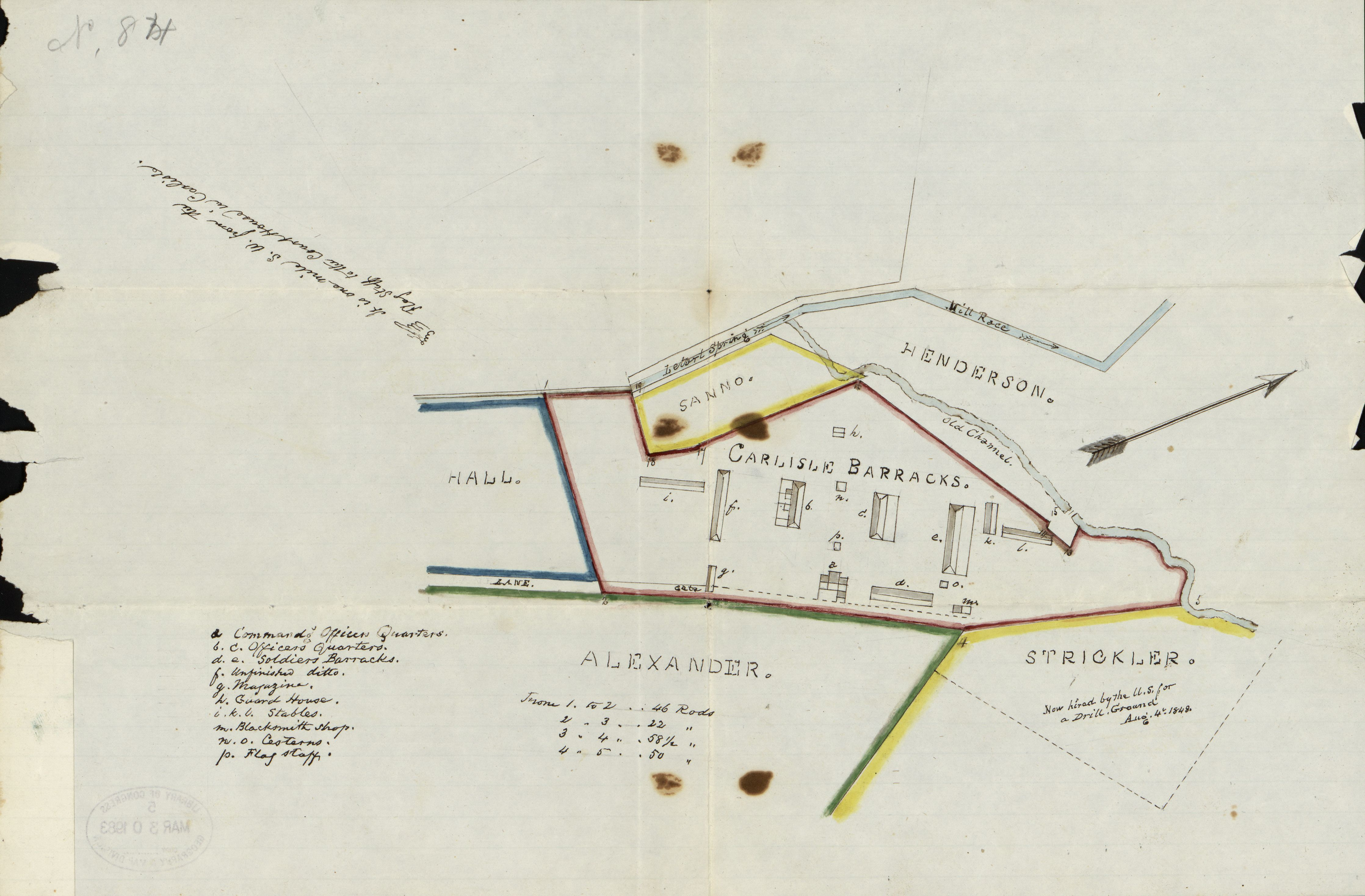
1848 map of Carlisle Barracks.

During the Revolutionary War, numerous substantial brick buildings were erected at Carlisle Barracks for military stores and to accommodate workmen of the revolutionary government's dedicated managing body for the Army, the Ordnance Department. While the facility might have been used to store ammunition and explosives, its lack of access to water transportation made it impractical because of the difficulty of overland travel at the time. The Hessian Powder Magazine, now Hessian Guardhouse Museum, was built in 1777.

In 1794, Carlisle Barracks became the center of intense federal military activity with the outbreak of the Whiskey Rebellion in the Pennsylvania backcountry. President George Washington journeyed to the barracks to review the troops—perhaps as many as 10,000 men. The crisis was posed by farmers in southwestern Pennsylvania, who refused to pay a tax on the commercial whiskey they distilled from their corn crops. They had found the alcohol more easily transported east over the Alleghenies and more profitable to sell than was corn as grain.

President Washington recommended the barracks as the site for a Federal military academy. But the state of New York won this prize, and West Point was developed on the west side of the Hudson River. The government decided to clear up ownership of the post; in 1801, the government paid $664.20 for the 27 acres (110,000 m^{2}) which it had been renting from William Penn's heirs.

In 1838 the US School of Cavalry Practice was established at Carlisle Barracks. It was the army's small mounted force of U.S. Dragoons, the forerunner of the Armor School at Fort Knox, Kentucky, and now at Fort Benning, Georgia. Captain E. V. Sumner found most of the barracks buildings in disrepair, the maneuver area less than adequate, and horses in short supply. Overcoming these problems included drilling his recruits at the double time on foot to simulate the trotting of the missing horses. Another mounted organization, horse-drawn light artillery, also established its school at Carlisle Barracks. In 1839, Captain Samuel Ringgold arrived to begin training recruits and testing equipment for the "flying artillery," as it was sometimes called.

=== Civil War ===
From the early Civil War days, south-central Pennsylvania was rife with rumors of a Confederate invasion up the Shenandoah-Cumberland Valley from Virginia to Pennsylvania. Although many miles from the combat front, the garrison at Carlisle became a central supply center for ordnance stores, horses, and quartermaster supplies under Captain David H. Hastings. Recruits once destined for Indian-fighting units on the western frontier were prepared to replace casualties in Regular Army units. Entire units were sent to the barracks to refit before specific deployment.

In June 1863, "the Rebels are coming!" was a cry with substance. In spite of a small defensive Pennsylvania militia and home guard force, Brigadier General Albert G. Jenkins' Confederate cavalry entered Carlisle on 27 June. Jenkins led his mounted brigade east along the Trindle Road, where they bivouacked while they took rations by wagon from the town. He had levied a demand for food for his 1,500 men and forage for their horses. Three North Carolina brigades occupied Carlisle Barracks; the troops camped on the parade grounds.

Major General J.E.B. Stuart's cavalry division approached Carlisle from the east on the afternoon of Wednesday, 1 July. Depleted by a sweeping march around the Union Army, Stuart hoped to find needed provisions; he did not know that other Confederate units had already sought the same Carlisle provisions. Stuart sent a demand for surrender of the Federal forces under the command of Brigadier General William Farrar Smith. When his demand was refused, Stuart initiated a short bombardment. When a second demand was refused, Stuart ordered his troops to shell the town and, later, to torch the barracks. See Battle of Carlisle.

After the Civil War ended, the barracks returned to its pre-war mission of receiving, training and forwarding cavalry recruits destined for the Indian wars on the western frontier. But, as army operations moved west, the War Department moved this function to the St. Louis Arsenal in Missouri. There it had access to transportation on the Mississippi and Missouri rivers. On 20 April 1871, Carlisle Barracks was officially "discontinued as a sub-Depot for the Mounted Recruit Service." The installation was available for new uses.

=== Carlisle Indian Industrial School ===
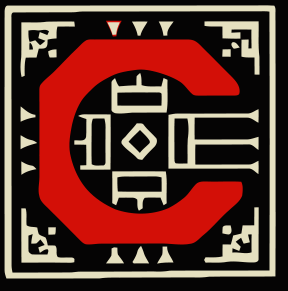
Carlisle Indian Industrial School logo

In 1879, the War Department transferred control of the post to the Department of the Interior. The US Congress had authorized the Bureau of Indian Affairs (BIA) to found the first off-reservation Indian boarding school for the education of Native American children. During and at the end of the Indian Wars, the US government sought a way to assimilate and integrate the children into European-American culture: teaching them English, trades, and Christianity.

The Carlisle Indian Industrial School officially opened on 1 November 1879 and operated until 1918. Among the first batch of students were groups of children from Sioux (Lakota) bands that had rebelled against the US. The Indian Bureau sent the children to the school to be educated and essentially kept as political hostages, to ensure compliant behavior on the part of the bands from which they had been taken.

Commanding General of the Army William T. Sherman had acceded to the petitions of Richard Henry Pratt to use the barracks for a model Indian school. The goal was for children to learn English and European-American ways, to gain an education apart from the reservations, and live among European-American men and women. Pratt believed Native Americans needed such education to be able to protect their lands and societies. He became the school's founder and first superintendent. He based the school's program on his experience since 1875 in supervising and educating Indian prisoners-of-war at Fort Marion in St. Augustine, Florida. Twenty young Indian men gained further education at Hampton Institute, a historically black college, and private schools in New York.

=== 1918—1950 ===
On 1 September 1918, with World War I underway, the U.S. Army took back Carlisle Barracks from the Department of Interior. It used the facility to respond to a wide set of changing army and security needs. At the end of World War I, the U.S. Army established General Hospital No. 31 as a pioneering rehabilitation center there. For two years, the hospital provided medical treatment, mental reconditioning and vocational training for more than 4,000 afflicted soldiers returned from service with the American Expeditionary Forces in France. Carlisle Barracks' equipment laboratory designed and tested new products, including improved lighting for field hospitals, a field dental dispensary, first aid kits for arctic rescue, and the "First-aid Packet, U.S. Government Carlisle Model" bandage field dressing

In the fall of 1920, the Medical Field Service School was established under Colonel Percy M. Ashburn's command. Drawing on the lessons of World War I, the school developed medical equipment and doctrine suitable for the battlefield. More than 30,000 officers and NCOs passed through the school during its 26-year tenure at Carlisle Barracks. They applied classroom instruction and field exercises to train in care of casualties and disease prevention, the latter a major problem for the military until improvements in sanitation and antibiotics.

When the Medical Field Service School departed in 1946 for Fort Sam Houston at San Antonio, Texas after World War II, educational innovation continued. From 1946 until 1951, six U.S. Army schools were located at Carlisle Barracks. First was the Army Information School, followed shortly by the School for Government of Occupied Areas, and the Adjutant General's School for army personnel managers. The next year brought the Chaplain School and the Military Police School. Finally, the Army Security Agency School began highly classified operations in 1949 and stayed for two years before being displaced.

=== United States Army War College ===
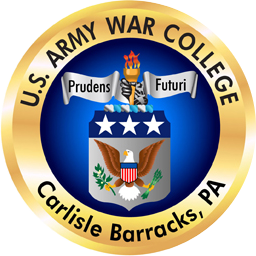
USAWC Logo

In the spring of 1951, the United States Army War College, senior educational institution of the U.S. Army, relocated to Carlisle Barracks in central Pennsylvania. The college, established in 1903 and formerly located in Washington, D.C., had functioned as part of the General Staff during its early years. It chiefly prepared selected officers for high command. Distinguished graduates of that period included John J. Pershing (Class of 1905), Dwight D. Eisenhower (1927), and Omar N. Bradley (1934).

Classes were suspended in 1940 during the preparedness mobilization for World War II, and not resumed until a decade later at Fort Leavenworth, Kansas, for the 1950–51 academic year. The new commandant, Lieutenant General Joseph M. Swing, relocated with the college to Pennsylvania in July 1951 and turned over command to his successor, Lieutenant General Edward M. Almond, in time for the arrival of the first Carlisle-based class.

At Carlisle, the Army War College expanded steadily, adding new programs and specialties. The college outgrew its main academic building (the current Upton Hall). In 1967 it transferred to Root Hall, newly constructed to accommodate current requirements. Two specialized agencies evolved into integral parts of the Army War College: the Strategic Studies Institute, first formed in 1954; and the Military History Institute, established in 1967. The Center for Strategic Leadership, a state-of-the-art war gaming complex, opened in 1994, incorporating increasingly sophisticated technology.

In 2005 the Carlisle Barracks was listed as a candidate for closure under the realignment process and hearings of the Base Realignment and Closure Commission, but was subsequently removed from the list. In 2006, ground was broken on a major project across the road from Carlisle Barracks: to construct new military housing, work that had been postponed pending BRAC review. It was part of the Residential Community Initiative, a public-private venture of the Army. In Carlisle, the development project included renovation of some historic housing, and construction of nearly 200 new units of housing with 3-4 bedrooms each, and more than 2000-2500 square feet of space.

== Location ==
A portion of the barracks property is in the Carlisle Barracks census-designated place, located in North Middleton Township, Pennsylvania. Much of the property is in the township, including territory that is not in the CDP. Another portion of the barracks is in Middlesex Township. Small portions of the barracks property are in Carlisle borough.

== Demographics ==
Carlisle Barracks CDP
- Census-designated place
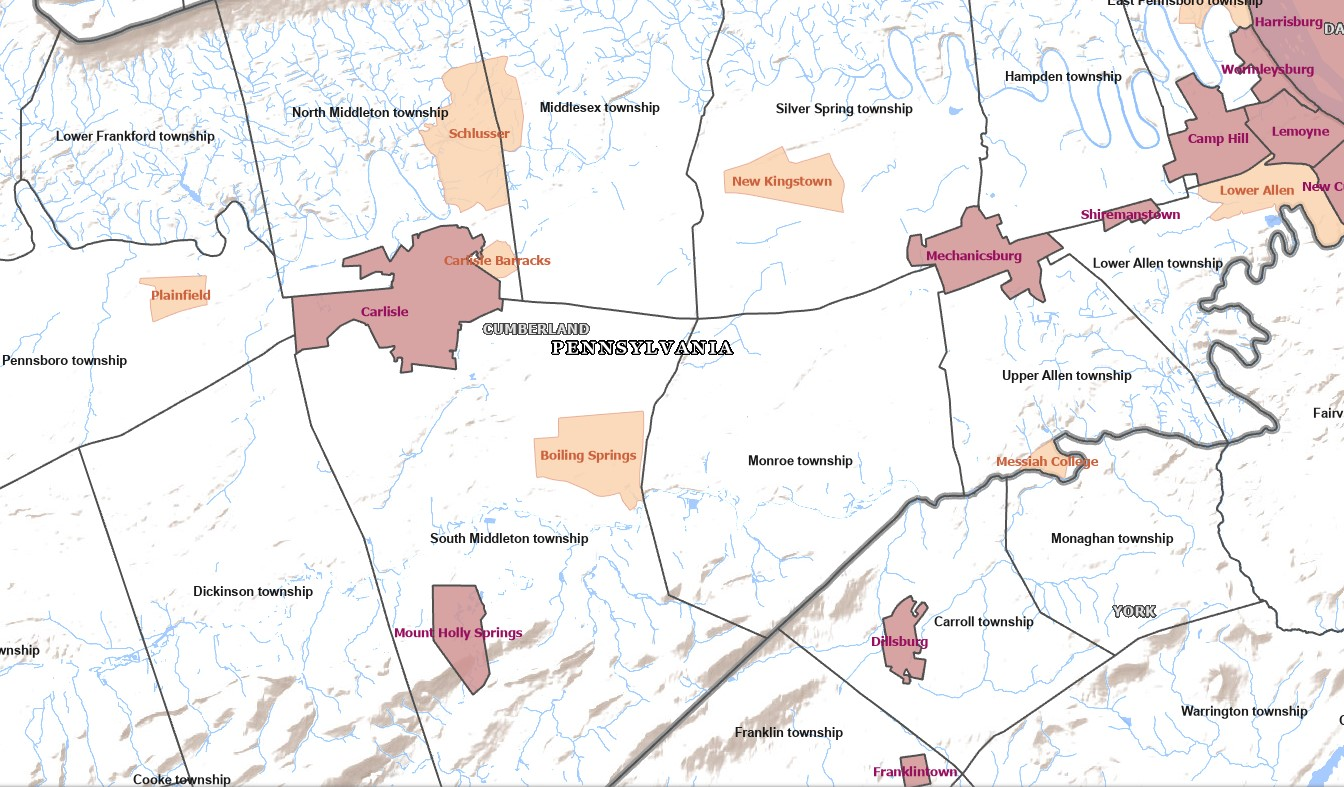

- Location within Pennsylvania Location within the United States
- Coordinates: 40.2102134°N 77.1729795°W
- Country: United States
- State: Pennsylvania
- County: Cumberland

Area
  - Total: 0.34 sq mi (0.88 km^{2})
  - Land: 0.34 sq mi (0.87 km^{2})
  - Water: 0.0039 sq mi (0.01 km^{2})
- Elevation: 463 ft (141 m)

Population (2020)
  - Total: 938
  - Density: 2,786.4/sq mi (1,075.84/km^{2})
- Time zone: UTC-5 (Eastern (EST))
  - Summer (DST): UTC-4 (EDT)
- FIPS code: 42-42041
- GNIS feature ID: 2804361

Carlisle Barracks CDP is a census-designated place (CDP) covering the residential population of the Carlisle Barracks in North Middleton Township, Cumberland County, Pennsylvania, United States. It was first listed as a CDP in the 2020 census with a population of 938.

The school district covering the CDP is Carlisle Area School District. Carlisle High School is the comprehensive high school of that district.

Historical population
Census	Pop.	Note	%±
2020	938		—
U.S. Decennial Census; 2020

=== 2020 census ===
Carlisle Barracks CDP, Pennsylvania – Demographic Profile (NH = Non-Hispanic) Note: the US Census treats Hispanic/Latino as an ethnic category. This table excludes Latinos from the racial categories and assigns them to a separate category. Hispanics/Latinos may be of any race.
Race / Ethnicity	Pop 2020	% 2020
White alone (NH)	709	75.59%
Black or African American alone (NH)	74	7.89%
Native American or Alaska Native alone (NH)	3	0.32%
Asian alone (NH)	27	2.88%
Pacific Islander alone (NH)	4	0.43%
Some Other Race alone (NH)	1	0.11%
Mixed Race/Multi-Racial (NH)	68	7.25%
Hispanic or Latino (any race)	52	5.54%
Total	938	100.00%
