= Caprivi =

Caprivi may refer to:

== Places ==
- Caprivi Region, the former name of the Zambezi Region, an administrative region of Namibia
- Caprivi Strip, the panhandle of Namibia
- Caprivi conflict, a secession attempt by the Caprivi Liberation Army and the Namibian government
- East Caprivi, a former Lozi bantustan in South West Africa
- Caprivi, Pennsylvania, an unincorporated community in Cumberland County, Pennsylvania, USA

== People ==
- Leo von Caprivi, German Chancellor 1890–1894

== Fictional characters ==
- Captain Caprivi, main hero of a South-African movie with the same name, which later was also illustrated in comic book format.
