= Masland =

Masland is a surname

== List of people with the surname ==
- Albert Masland (born 1956), American politician
- Kim Masland, Canadian politician

== See also ==
- Maslandapur
