= John Broujos =

American politician

Member of the Pennsylvania House of Representatives from the 199th district
- In office 1983 – November 30, 1992
- Preceded by: Joe Rocks
- Succeeded by: Albert Masland

Personal details
- Born: February 12, 1929 Wilmington, Delaware
- Died: July 8, 2016 (aged 87) Pittsburgh, Pennsylvania
- Party: Democratic
- Education: Dickinson School of Law

John H. Broujos (February 12, 1929 – July 8, 2016) was a Democratic member of the Pennsylvania House of Representatives. He served for five terms until his retirement.

== Early life and career ==
Broujos was born in Wilmington, Delaware. He volunteered to serve in the Marine Corps during the Korean War and the Vietnam War. During the Korean War he was awarded the Silver Star, and he ultimately retired from the Corps as a colonel. He later entered law practice.

John A. Maher, a later Republican member of the Pennsylvania House of Representatives, has frequently cited Broujos for inspiring him to be as effective a legislator as possible.

== Personal life ==
He had four children with his wife Louise.
