= North Middleton Township, Pennsylvania =

Township in Pennsylvania, US

Coordinates: 40°14′00″N 77°13′59″W

- Township
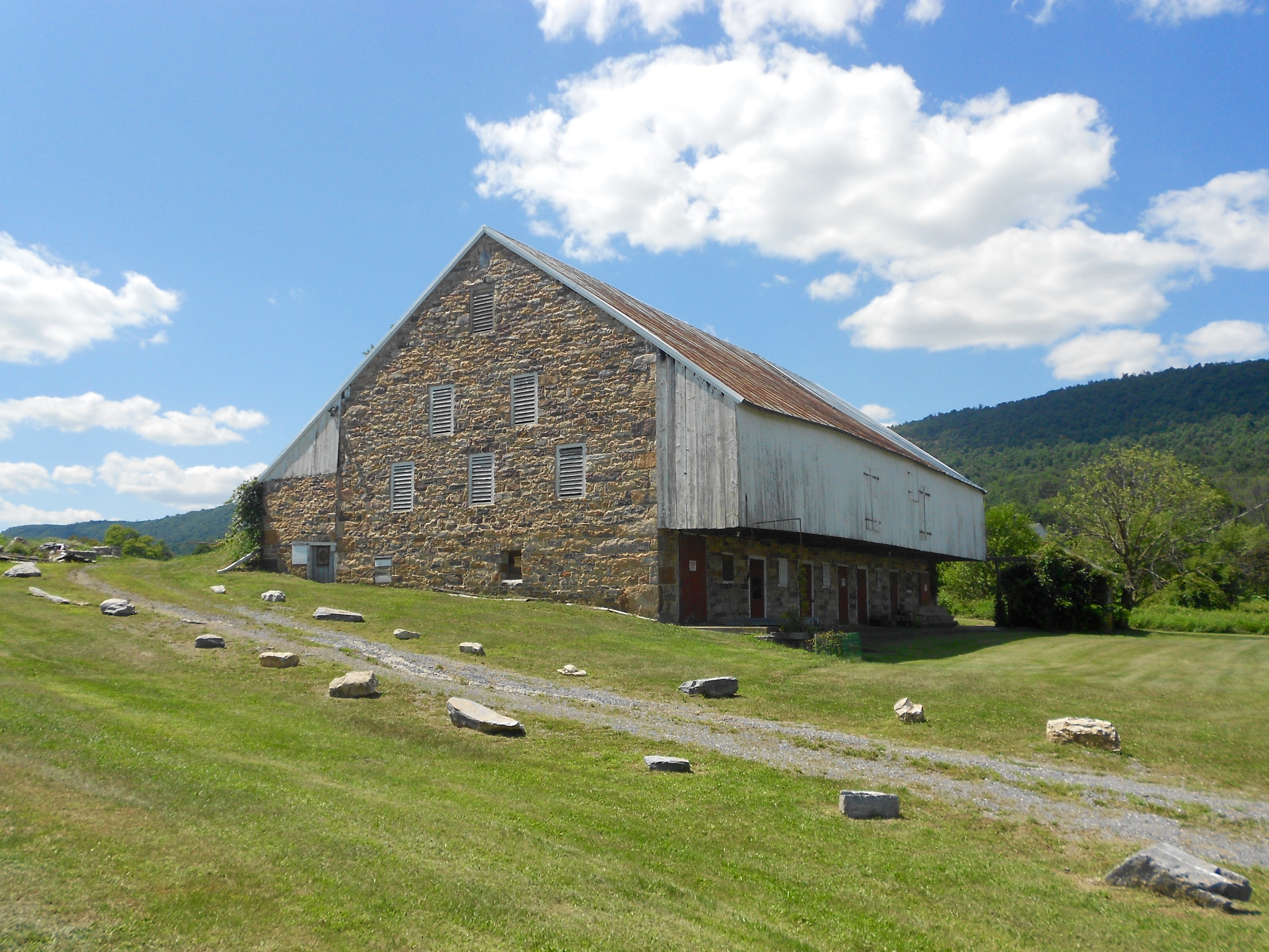
- Barn on PA 74

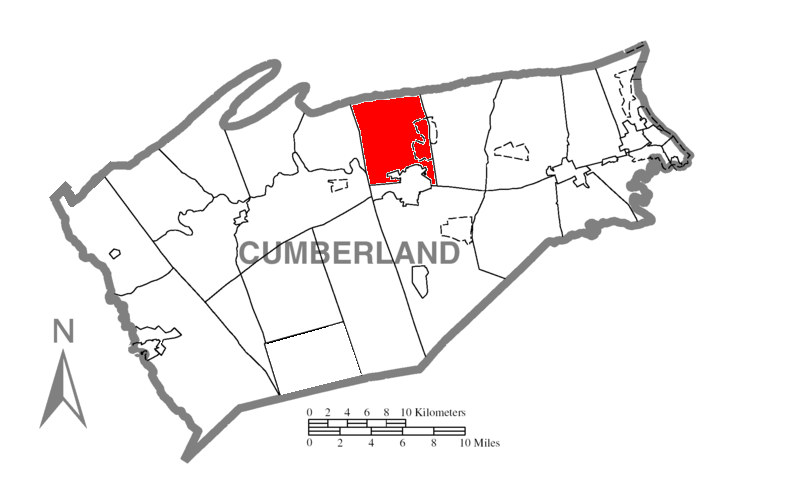
- Map of Cumberland County, Pennsylvania highlighting North Middleton Township

- Map of Cumberland County, Pennsylvania
- Country: United States
- State: Pennsylvania
- County: Cumberland

Government
  - Type: Board of Supervisors

Area
  - Total: 23.53 sq mi (60.94 km^{2})
  - Land: 23.19 sq mi (60.07 km^{2})
  - Water: 0.34 sq mi (0.87 km^{2})

Population (2020)
  - Total: 12,039
  - Density: 498.3/sq mi (192.41/km^{2})
- Time zone: UTC-5 (Eastern (EST))
  - Summer (DST): UTC-4 (EDT)
- Area code: 717
- FIPS code: 42-041-55216
- Website: www.nmiddleton.com

North Middleton Township is a township in Cumberland County, Pennsylvania, United States. The population was 12,039 at the 2020 census.

The township manager is John M. Epley

== Geography ==
The township is in north-central Cumberland County, bordered by Perry County to the north and the borough of Carlisle, the Cumberland County seat, to the south. The Perry County line follows the crest of Blue Mountain. Conodoguinet Creek, a tributary of the Susquehanna River, crosses the southern part of the township just north of Carlisle, making several large bends. The Pennsylvania Turnpike (Interstate 76) crosses the township between the creek and Carlisle, with the closest access being in Middlesex Township to the east.

Half of the Carlisle Fairgrounds and much of the Carlisle Barracks, containing the U.S. Army War College, are located in the township adjacent to Carlisle borough. A portion of the Carlisle Indian Industrial School National Historic Landmark is in the township.

According to the United States Census Bureau, the township has a total area of 23.5 square miles (60.9 km^{2}), of which 23.2 square miles (60.1 km^{2}) is land and 0.3 square miles (0.9 km^{2}), or 1.43%, is water.

unincorporated communities in North Middleton Township:

- Schlusser, a census-designated place
- Caprivi
- Carlisle Barracks CDP

== History ==
When Cumberland County was founded in 1750, it originally consisted of three townships: East and West Pennsborough Townships, and Middleton Township. In 1810, due to population increase, Middleton Township was divided into North Middleton Township to the north of Carlisle, and South Middleton Township to the south. In the mid 18th century, the area that is now the township was inhabited primarily by Scotch Irish settlers who were granted land patents in that region by the family of William Penn, the proprietors of Pennsylvania at the time. The rapid settlement of this area at that time was the result of the Penns' plan to keep the Scotch Irish who were viewed as rowdy and unsophisticated out of the more refined Lancaster and York counties to the southeast. Thus, by the late 1700s, the population west of the Susquehanna River was composed almost exclusively of Scotch Irish settlers.

As was common of most areas in the Cumberland Valley at that time, most early settlers of North Middleton Township were farmers by trade, and perhaps the area's most lasting legacy was the great quantity and quality of barns built there. The majority of these barns exhibited a style that came to be known as the Pennsylvania barn. Many of these barns were built during the late 1800s, but a fair number still exist in the township today. According to a township publication from 1976, there were 78 barns still standing in the area, and although this number has dwindled since that time, there are still several dozen barns in the township today, and agriculture still remains a substantial sector in the region's economy.

== Demographics ==
Historical population
| Census | Pop. | Note | %± |
|---|---|---|---|
| 2000 | 10,197 | | — |
| 2010 | 11,143 | | 9.3% |
| 2020 | 12,039 | | 8.0% |
U.S. Decennial Census

As of the census of 2000, there were 10,197 people, 4,039 households, and 2,948 families residing in the township. The population density was 433.3 inhabitants per square mile (167.3/km^{2}). There were 4,213 housing units at an average density of 179.0 units per square mile (69.1 units/km^{2}). The racial makeup of the township was 93.05% White, 3.41% African American, 0.20% Native American, 1.55% Asian, 0.11% Pacific Islander, 0.63% from other races, and 1.06% from two or more races. Hispanic or Latino of any race were 1.48% of the population.

There were 4,039 households, out of which 31.4% had children under the age of 18 living with them, 61.6% were married couples living together, 8.2% had a female householder with no husband present, and 27.0% were non-families. 22.2% of all households were made up of individuals, and 8.4% had someone living alone who was 65 years of age or older. The average household size was 2.48 and the average family size was 2.89.

In the township the population was spread out, with 23.3% under the age of 18, 6.8% from 18 to 24, 29.0% from 25 to 44, 27.0% from 45 to 64, and 13.9% who were 65 years of age or older. The median age was 40 years. For every 100 females, there were 94.0 males. For every 100 females age 18 and over, there were 91.1 males.

The median income for a household in the township was $50,010, and the median income for a family was $56,846. Males had a median income of $37,880 versus $25,791 for females. The per capita income for the township was $22,947. About 1.4% of families and 2.5% of the population were below the poverty line, including 1.9% of those under age 18 and 4.0% of those age 65 or over.

== Government and infrastructure ==
Much of the Carlisle Barracks property is in North Middleton Township, and this includes the census-designated place.

== Education ==
The school district is Carlisle Area School District. Carlisle High School is the comprehensive high school of that district.
