= Carlisle High School (Carlisle, Pennsylvania) =

Location
- 623 West Penn Street; Carlisle, Pennsylvania 17013; United States
- 40°12′40″N 77°12′25″W

Information
- Motto: Be Just and Fear Not
- School district: Carlisle Area School District
- Principal: Michael Black
- Teaching staff: 110.61 (on an FTE basis)
- Grades: 9-12
- Enrollment: 1,581 (2023–2024)
- Student to teacher ratio: 14.29
- Colors: Green and White
- Mascot: Bison
- Team name: Carlisle Thundering Herd
- Website: chs.carlisleschools.org

Carlisle High School is a public high school located in Carlisle, Pennsylvania, United States. It serves grades 9–12 for the Carlisle Area School District.

The district includes Carlisle and Mount Holly Springs boroughs (the latter being an exclave of the school district), and the townships of and Dickinson and North Middleton. The district also includes the Carlisle Barracks census-designated place as well as most of the Schlusser census-designated place.

== Demographics ==
The demographic breakdown of the 1,526 students enrolled for 2018–19 was:

- Male – 50.7%
- Female – 49.3%
- Native American/Alaskan – 0.2%
- Asian – 1.7%
- Black – 7.6%
- Hispanic – 7.7%
- White – 75.6%
- Multiracial – 7.2%

27.7% of the students were eligible for free or reduced-cost lunch. For 2018–19, Carlisle was a Title I school.

== Notable alumni ==
- Deborah L. Birx, physician and ambassador
- Sid Bream, Major League Baseball (MLB) first baseman
- Stephen D. Houston, Dupee Family Professor of Social Science at Brown University
- Bob Lilley, professional soccer coach
- Billy Owens (class of 1988), National Basketball Association (NBA) guard
- Lee Woodall (class of 1988), National Football League (NFL) linebacker
