= Dickinson Township, Cumberland County, Pennsylvania =

Township in Pennsylvania, US

Coordinates: 40°05′00″N 77°15′59″W

Dickinson Township, Pennsylvania
- Township
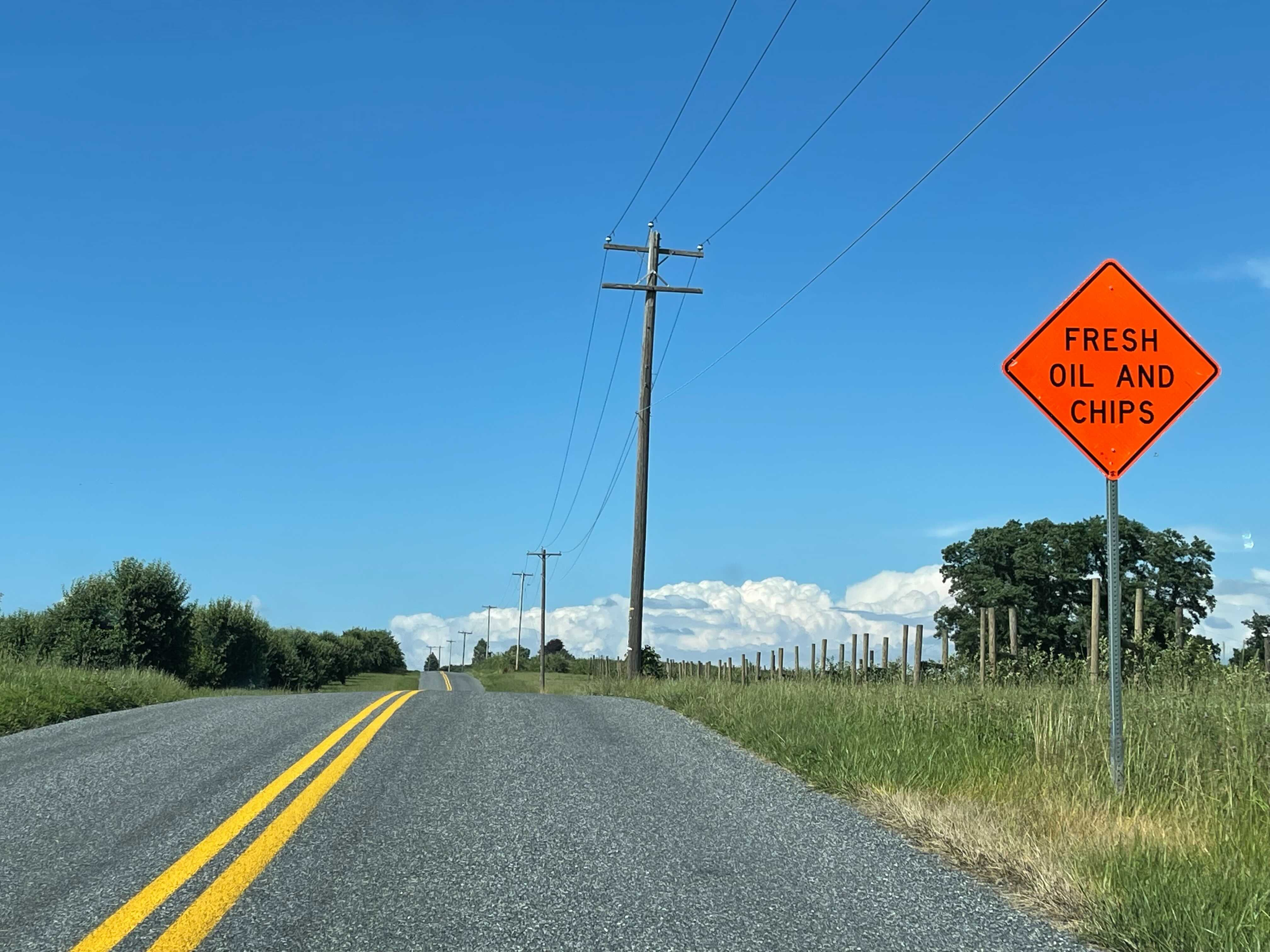
- Scenery along a road in Dickinson Township

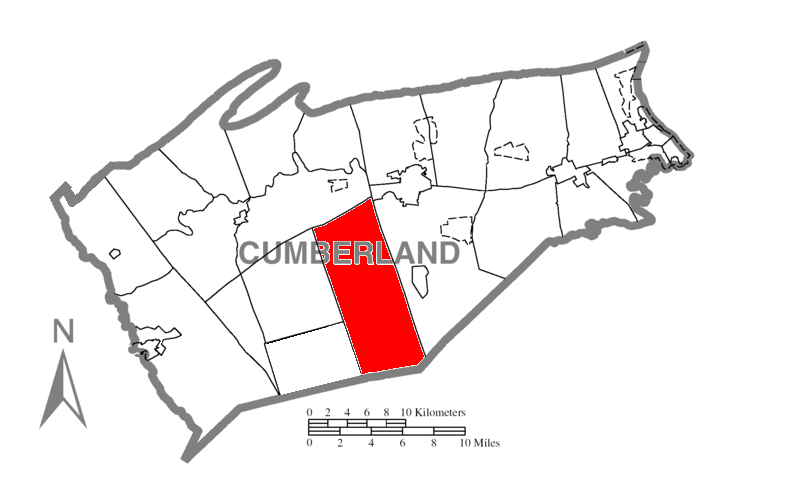
- Map of Cumberland County, Pennsylvania highlighting Dickinson Township

- Map of Cumberland County, Pennsylvania
- Country: United States
- State: Pennsylvania
- County: Cumberland

Government
  - Type: Board of Supervisors

Area
  - Total: 46.03 sq mi (119.23 km^{2})
  - Land: 45.81 sq mi (118.65 km^{2})
  - Water: 0.22 sq mi (0.57 km^{2})

Population (2020)
  - Total: 5,300 ▲
  - Estimate (2023): 5,407
  - Density: 117.6/sq mi (45.39/km^{2})
- Time zone: UTC-5 (Eastern (EST))
  - Summer (DST): UTC-4 (EDT)
- Area code: 717
- FIPS code: 42-041-19144
- Website: www.dickinsontownship.org

Historical population
| Census | Pop. | Note | %± |
|---|---|---|---|
| 2000 | 4,702 | | — |
| 2010 | 5,223 | | 11.1% |
| 2020 | 5,300 | | 1.5% |
| 2023 (est.) | 5,407 | | 2.0% |

Dickinson Township is a township in Cumberland County, Pennsylvania, United States. The population was 5,300 at the 2020 census, up from 5,223 at the 2010 census.

== Geography ==
The township is in south-central Cumberland County, bordered to the south by Adams County. The northern half of the township is in the Cumberland Valley, while the southern half is occupied by South Mountain, Piney Mountain, and their adjacent valleys. Unincorporated communities in the township include, from north to south, Mooredale, Barnitz, Montsera, Toland, Goodyear, Gardners (part), and Myerstown.

According to the United States Census Bureau, the township has a total area of 46.0 square miles (119.2 km^{2}), of which 45.8 square miles (118.6 km^{2}) is land and 0.23 square miles (0.6 km^{2}), or 0.48%, is water.

== Demographics ==
As of the census of 2000, there were 4,702 people, 1,721 households, and 1,413 families residing in the township. The population density was 103.1 inhabitants per square mile (39.8/km^{2}). There were 1,834 housing units at an average density of 40.2 units per square mile (15.5 units/km^{2}). The racial makeup of the township was 98.30% White, 0.49% African American, 0.11% Native American, 0.38% Asian, 0.02% Pacific Islander, 0.19% from other races, and 0.51% from two or more races. Hispanic or Latino of any race were 0.47% of the population.

There were 1,721 households, out of which 36.8% had children under the age of 18 living with them, 74.0% were married couples living together, 4.5% had a female householder with no husband present, and 17.9% were non-families. 14.0% of all households were made up of individuals, and 5.9% had someone living alone who was 65 years of age or older. The average household size was 2.73 and the average family size was 3.01.

In the township the population was spread out, with 25.6% under the age of 18, 5.8% from 18 to 24, 29.6% from 25 to 44, 28.0% from 45 to 64, and 11.1% who were 65 years of age or older. The median age was 39.8 years. For every 100 females there were 99.9 males. For every 100 females age 18 and over, there were 99.8 males.

The median income for a household in the township was $51,363, and the median income for a family was $54,844. Males had a median income of $36,955 versus $24,038 for females. The per capita income for the township was $24,977. About 2.3% of families and 3.3% of the population were below the poverty line, including 2.6% of those under age 18 and 5.2% of those age 65 or over.

== Education ==
The school district is Carlisle Area School District. Carlisle High School is the comprehensive high school of that district.
