= Schlusser, Pennsylvania =

Unincorporated community in Pennsylvania, US

- Census-designated place
- Location within the U.S. state of Pennsylvania Schlusser (the United States)
- Coordinates: 40°14′19″N 77°11′1″W
- Country: United States
- State: Pennsylvania
- County: Cumberland
- Townships: North Middleton, Middlesex

Area
  - Total: 2.99 sq mi (7.75 km^{2})
  - Land: 2.92 sq mi (7.56 km^{2})
  - Water: 0.073 sq mi (0.19 km^{2})
- Elevation: 425 ft (130 m)

Population (2010)
  - Total: 5,265
  - Density: 1,805/sq mi (696.8/km^{2})
- Time zone: UTC-5 (Eastern (EST))
  - Summer (DST): UTC-4 (EDT)
- ZIP code: 17013
- Area code: 717
- FIPS code: 42-68188
- GNIS feature ID: 1867508

Schlusser (pronounced Schl/u/sher) is a census-designated place (CDP) in North Middleton and Middlesex townships, Cumberland County, Pennsylvania, United States. The population was 5,265 at the 2010 census. It is part of the Harrisburg–Carlisle Metropolitan Statistical Area.

== Geography ==
Schlusser is located directly northeast of Carlisle, the county seat, at 40°14′19″N 77°11′1″W (40.238528, -77.183573), in eastern North Middleton Township and western Middlesex Township. Conodoguinet Creek, a tributary of the Susquehanna River, flows through the middle of the CDP. Pennsylvania Route 34 (Spring Road) is the main road through the community, leading south 4 miles (6 km) to downtown Carlisle and northeast 8 miles (13 km) across Blue Mountain to Shermans Dale.

According to the United States Census Bureau, the Schlusser CDP has a total area of 2.99 square miles (7.75 km^{2}), of which 2.92 square miles (7.56 km^{2}) is land and 0.07 square miles (0.19 km^{2}), or 2.50%, is water.

== Demographics ==
As of the census of 2000, there were 4,750 people, 1,953 households, and 1,384 families residing in the CDP. The population density was 1,616.4 people per square mile (624.1 people/km^{2}). There were 2,039 housing units at an average density of 693.9 per square mile (267.9/km^{2}). The racial makeup of the CDP was 92.34% White, 3.35% African American, 0.23% Native American, 2.15% Asian, 0.21% Pacific Islander, 0.69% from other races, and 1.03% from two or more races. Hispanic or Latino of any race were 1.66% of the population.

There were 1,953 households, out of which 31.4% had children under the age of 18 living with them, 58.3% were married couples living together, 9.5% had a female householder with no husband present, and 29.1% were non-families. 23.7% of all households were made up of individuals, and 7.2% had someone living alone who was 65 years of age or older. The average household size was 2.43 and the average family size was 2.86.

In the CDP, the population was spread out, with 22.5% under the age of 18, 7.4% from 18 to 24, 31.6% from 25 to 44, 27.1% from 45 to 64, and 11.5% who were 65 years of age or older. The median age was 38 years. For every 100 females, there were 92.4 males. For every 100 females age 18 and over, there were 90.3 males.

The median income for a household in the CDP was $49,299, and the median income for a family was $55,616. Males had a median income of $36,279 versus $28,099 for females. The per capita income for the CDP was $22,084. About 1.2% of families and 2.0% of the population were below the poverty line, including 2.1% of those under age 18 and 4.2% of those age 65 or over.

== Education ==
Portions in North Middleton Township are in the Carlisle Area School District. The portion in Middlesex Township is in the Cumberland Valley School District. The respective comprehensive high schools are Carlisle High School and Cumberland Valley High School.
