= Jack Hamilton =

Jack or Jackie Hamilton may refer to:

== In sport ==
- Jack Hamilton (baseball) (1938–2018), Major League Baseball pitcher
- Jack Hamilton (footballer, born 1928) (1928–1990), Australian rules football player for Collingwood and administrator
- Jack Hamilton (footballer, born 1937), Australian rules footballer for South Melbourne
- Jack Hamilton (footballer, born 1994), Scottish association football goalkeeper for Dundee
- Jack Hamilton (footballer, born 2000), Scottish association football forward for Raith Rovers
- Jack Hamilton (sports executive) (1886–1976), Canadian sports executive
- Jackie Hamilton (ice hockey) (1925–1994), hockey player with the Toronto Maple Leafs

== Others ==
- Jack Hamilton (actor), British actor, starred in the 2025 British film Vanilla
- Jackie Hamilton (1937–2003), English stand-up comedian
- John Hamilton (gangster) or Jack Hamilton (1899–1934), Canadian murderer and bank-robber

== See also ==
- "The Death of Jack Hamilton", a 2002 short story by Stephen King
- John Hamilton (disambiguation)
