= 1995 Philadelphia mayoral election =

- November 7, 1995
- Turnout: 39% ▼22 pp
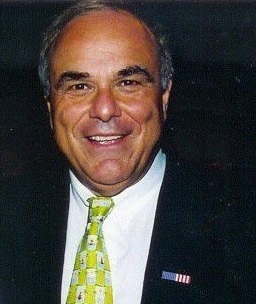

Nominee	Ed Rendell	Joe Rocks
Party	Democratic	Republican
Popular vote	232,798	63,131
Percentage	76.56%	20.76%
- Results by ward Rendell: 50–60% 60–70% 70–80% 80–90% >90%
Mayor before election
Ed Rendell
Democratic
Elected mayor
Ed Rendell
Democratic

The 1995 Philadelphia mayoral election saw the reelection of Democrat Ed Rendell.

== General election ==
=== Results ===
1995 Philadelphia mayoral election
Party	Candidate	Votes	%
Democratic	Ed Rendell (incumbent)	232,798	76.56
Republican	Joe Rocks	63,131	20.76
Consumer	Lance Haver	6,782	2.23
Socialist	Deborah O. Liatos	1,365	0.45
Total votes		304,076	100.00
Democratic hold			
