= Will Gabig =

American politician

Member of the Pennsylvania House of Representatives from the 199th district
- In office January 2, 2001 – November 30, 2010
- Preceded by: Albert Masland
- Succeeded by: Stephen Bloom

Personal details
- Born: 1956 (age 69–70) Virginia
- Party: Republican
- Education: Saint Vincent College, Duquesne University School of Law, National Institute for Trial Advocacy
- Occupation: Attorney, U.S. Navy, retired
- Website: http://willgabig.com

William I. Gabig (born 1956) is an American politician and former member of the Pennsylvania House of Representatives.

== Career ==
Prior to his tenure as a state legislator, Gabig volunteered as a Moot Court Judge for both the Dickinson School of Law and Widener University School of Law. He also volunteered as an instructor for the Pennsylvania Game Commission Academy and the Harrisburg Area Community College’s Municipal Police Academy. He also had a position as a part-time instructor at Troy State University’s Armed Forces Branch Campus.

Gabig was first an Assistant District Attorney in Dauphin County, Pennsylvania then a Senior Assistant District Attorney in Cumberland County, Pennsylvania.

Gabig launched his career in the U.S. Navy as a Judge Advocate. He rose to the rank of Commander and continued afterward to serve as a reservist.

He announced that he would not seek re-election in 2010.

Currently, Mr. Gabig serves as a Commissioner on the Commonwealth of Pennsylvania Workers' Compensation Appeal Board.

== Personal ==
Gabig earned his Bachelor of Science in 1979 from Saint Vincent College, Latrobe, Pennsylvania, majoring in political science and minoring in economics. In 1985, Gabig earned his Juris Doctor at the Duquesne University School of Law. He later graduated from the National Institute for Trial Advocacy.

He is actively involved in his community as a member of the Cumberland County Bar Association, Cumberland County Law Enforcement Officer’s Association, the Marine Corps League, the Carlisle Fish and Game Club, Knights of Columbus Council 4057 and the American Legion Post 101.

He and his wife Patricia (nee, Iezzoni), a veterinarian, have two children and currently reside in Camp Hill, Pennsylvania.
