= Joe Rocks =

American politician (born 1947)

M. Joseph Rocks

Member of the Pennsylvania Senate from the 4th district
- In office 1983 – November 30, 1990
- Preceded by: Joseph F. Smith
- Succeeded by: Allyson Schwartz

Member of the Pennsylvania House of Representatives from the 199th district
- In office January 2, 1979 – 1982
- Preceded by: John Hamilton
- Succeeded by: John Broujos

Personal details
- Born: June 6, 1947 (age 79)
- Party: Republican (until 1982); Democratic (1982–1989); Republican (1989–present)
- Children: 3
- Education: Community College of Philadelphia (AS); University of Iowa (BA)

M. Joseph Rocks (born June 6, 1947) is an American politician from Pennsylvania who served as a Democratic member of the Pennsylvania Senate for the 4th district from 1983 to 1988 and as a Republican member of the same Senate district from 1988 to 1990. He also served as a Republican member of the Pennsylvania House of Representatives, District 199 from 1979 to 1982.

== Early life ==
Rocks was born in Philadelphia, Pennsylvania to Joseph F. and Catherine (Gilchrist) Rocks. He graduated from West Catholic Boys High School in 1965. He received an A.S. degree from Community College of Philadelphia in 1967. He served in the U.S. Army Security Agency from 1967 to 1971 and studied German at the Defense Language Institute in Monterey, California. He received a B.A. degree from the University of Iowa in 1972.

== Career ==
Rocks was elected as a Republican to the Pennsylvania House of Representatives for the 199th district and served from 1979 to 1982. He changed party affiliation to Democratic in 1982 and was elected to the Pennsylvania State Senate for the 4th district and served from 1983 to 1987. He switched party affiliation again to Republican and served in the Senate from 1988 to 1990.

He was a Philadelphia mayoral candidate in 1995. During his time in the Pennsylvania State Senate, Rocks, created the Pennsylvania Intergovernmental Cooperation Authority board to monitor all spending by then mayor Wilson Goode and the city council. All money spent by the city government had to be approved by the board. Rocks ran for Philadelphia City Controller in 1989, where he lost to Democrat Jonathan Saidel. Rocks also ran as a Republican for mayor in 1995, losing to incumbent Ed Rendell.

Throughout his career in politics, Rocks was known as a fighter and an aggressive campaigner. His campaign against Allyson Schwartz in 1990, when he lost his State Senate seat, was particularly bitter, with negative campaigning from both sides. Among the more wild accusations was the assertion from the Schwartz campaign that Rocks had an alcohol problem and engaged in promiscuous behavior. The comments had apparently been prepared as a joke by a staffer, released accidentally, and Schwartz apologized, but the campaign became increasingly acrimonious from that point forward.

After leaving politics, Rocks became the CEO of Northwestern Human Services (NHS) from 2000 to 2014.

He lives outside of Philadelphia, where he moved from his home in the Roxborough section of Philadelphia during his term. He has three children, and a few grandchildren.
