= Upper Frankford Township, Pennsylvania =

Township in Pennsylvania, US

Coordinates: 40°14′00″N 77°21′59″W

- Township
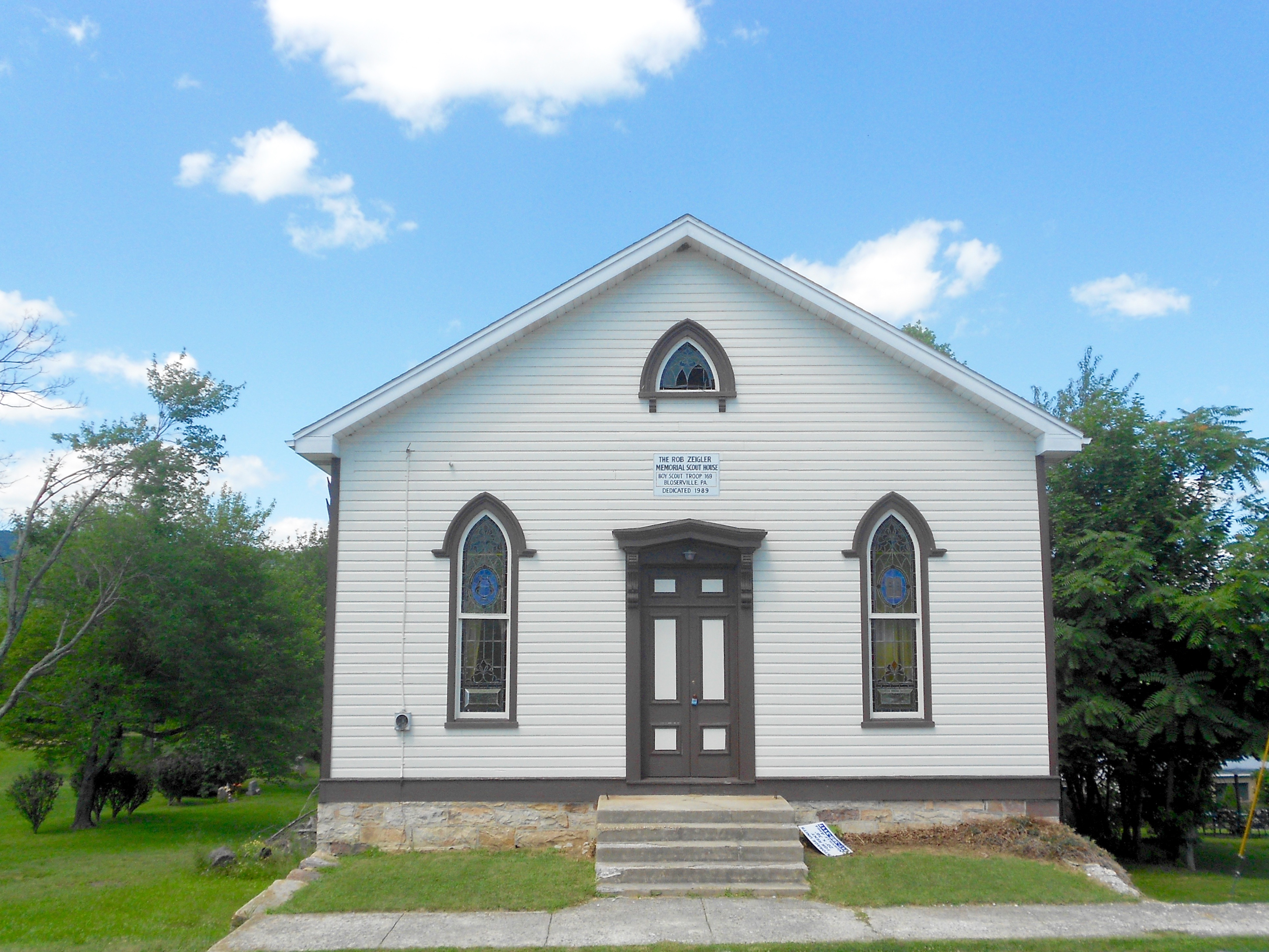
- Rob Zeigler Memorial Scout House in Bloserville

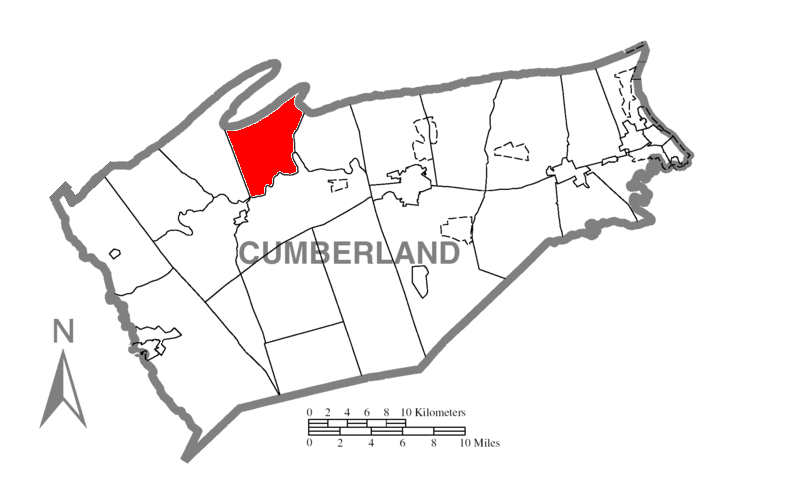
- Map of Cumberland County, Pennsylvania highlighting Upper Frankford Township

- Map of Cumberland County, Pennsylvania
- Country: United States
- State: Pennsylvania
- County: Cumberland

Government
  - Type: Board of Supervisors

Area
  - Total: 19.61 sq mi (50.80 km^{2})
  - Land: 19.43 sq mi (50.32 km^{2})
  - Water: 0.19 sq mi (0.48 km^{2})

Population (2010)
  - Total: 2,005
  - Estimate (2016): 2,045
  - Density: 105.3/sq mi (40.64/km^{2})
- Time zone: UTC-5 (Eastern (EST))
  - Summer (DST): UTC-4 (EDT)
- Area code: 717
- FIPS code: 42-041-79032

Historical population
Census	Pop.	Note	%±
2000	1,807		—
2010	2,005		11.0%
2016 (est.)	2,045		2.0%
U.S. Decennial Census

Upper Frankford Township is a township in Cumberland County, Pennsylvania, United States. The population was 2,005 at the 2010 census.

== Geography ==
The township is on the northern side of Cumberland County and is bordered to the north by Perry County; the county line follows the ridgecrest of Blue Mountain, the northern edge of the Cumberland Valley. The eastern border is Lower Frankford Township, sister township caused by the 1921 split of old Frankford Township. The twin townships' southern border with West Pennsboro Township was created in April 1795 by the County Court and follows Conodoguinet Creek, a tributary of the Susquehanna River. Lower Mifflin Township is the western border of Upper Frankford Township. The township includes the unincorporated community of Bloserville.

According to the United States Census Bureau, the township has a total area of 19.6 square miles (50.8 km^{2}), of which 19.4 square miles (50.3 km^{2}) is land and 0.19 square miles (0.5 km^{2}), or 0.95%, is water.

== Demographics ==
As of the census of 2000, there were 1,807 people, 669 households, and 533 families residing in the township. The population density was 92.5 inhabitants per square mile (35.7/km^{2}). There were 719 housing units at an average density of 36.8 per square mile (14.2/km^{2}). The racial makeup of the township was 97.95% White, 0.50% African American, 0.11% Native American, 0.66% Asian, 0.22% from other races, and 0.55% from two or more races. Hispanic or Latino of any race were 0.33% of the population.

There were 669 households, out of which 36.8% had children under the age of 18 living with them, 67.0% were married couples living together, 7.5% had a female householder with no husband present, and 20.2% were non-families. 15.8% of all households were made up of individuals, and 4.8% had someone living alone who was 65 years of age or older. The average household size was 2.70 and the average family size was 2.99.

In the township the population was spread out, with 25.7% under the age of 18, 7.1% from 18 to 24, 32.8% from 25 to 44, 25.5% from 45 to 64, and 8.9% who were 65 years of age or older. The median age was 37 years. For every 100 females, there were 102.4 males. For every 100 females age 18 and over, there were 99.4 males.

The median income for a household in the township was $42,688, and the median income for a family was $45,764. Males had a median income of $34,097 versus $23,160 for females. The per capita income for the township was $16,819. About 5.1% of families and 6.2% of the population were below the poverty line, including 6.3% of those under age 18 and 8.8% of those age 65 or over.
