= Stephen Bloom (politician) =

American politician

Member of the Pennsylvania House of Representatives from the 199th district
- In office January 4, 2011 – January 1, 2019
- Preceded by: Will Gabig
- Succeeded by: Barbara Gleim

Personal details
- Born: October 10, 1961 (age 64) Manhasset, New York
- Party: Republican
- Spouse: Sharon Bloom
- Children: 3 Children
- Education: Pennsylvania State University (BS); Dickinson School of Law (JD)
- Occupation: Attorney
- Website: http://repbloom.com

Stephen Bloom (born October 10, 1961) is an American politician and was a member of the Pennsylvania House of Representatives.

== Career ==
Bloom was a candidate in the 2018 Republican Congressional primary for the newly re-districted Pennsylvania's 13th congressional district. Despite his endorsement by the House Freedom Fund (the political wing of the conservative House Freedom Caucus), Bloom failed to receive the nomination in a crowded 8 candidate race. He represented the 199th District from 2011 to 2019. He has also practiced law for the past twenty years, and currently serves as counsel with the Carlisle firm of Irwin & McKnight, P.C. He is also an adjunct professor of management and business at Messiah College in Grantham. He is the author of two books: The Believers' Guide to Legal Issues, and They've Crossed the Line: A Patriot's Guide to Religious Freedom.

== Personal ==
Bloom is a member of the Pennsylvania Farm Bureau, the Pennsylvania Bar Association, and the Christian Legal Society.
