= Hessian Powder Magazine =

- U.S. National Register of Historic Places
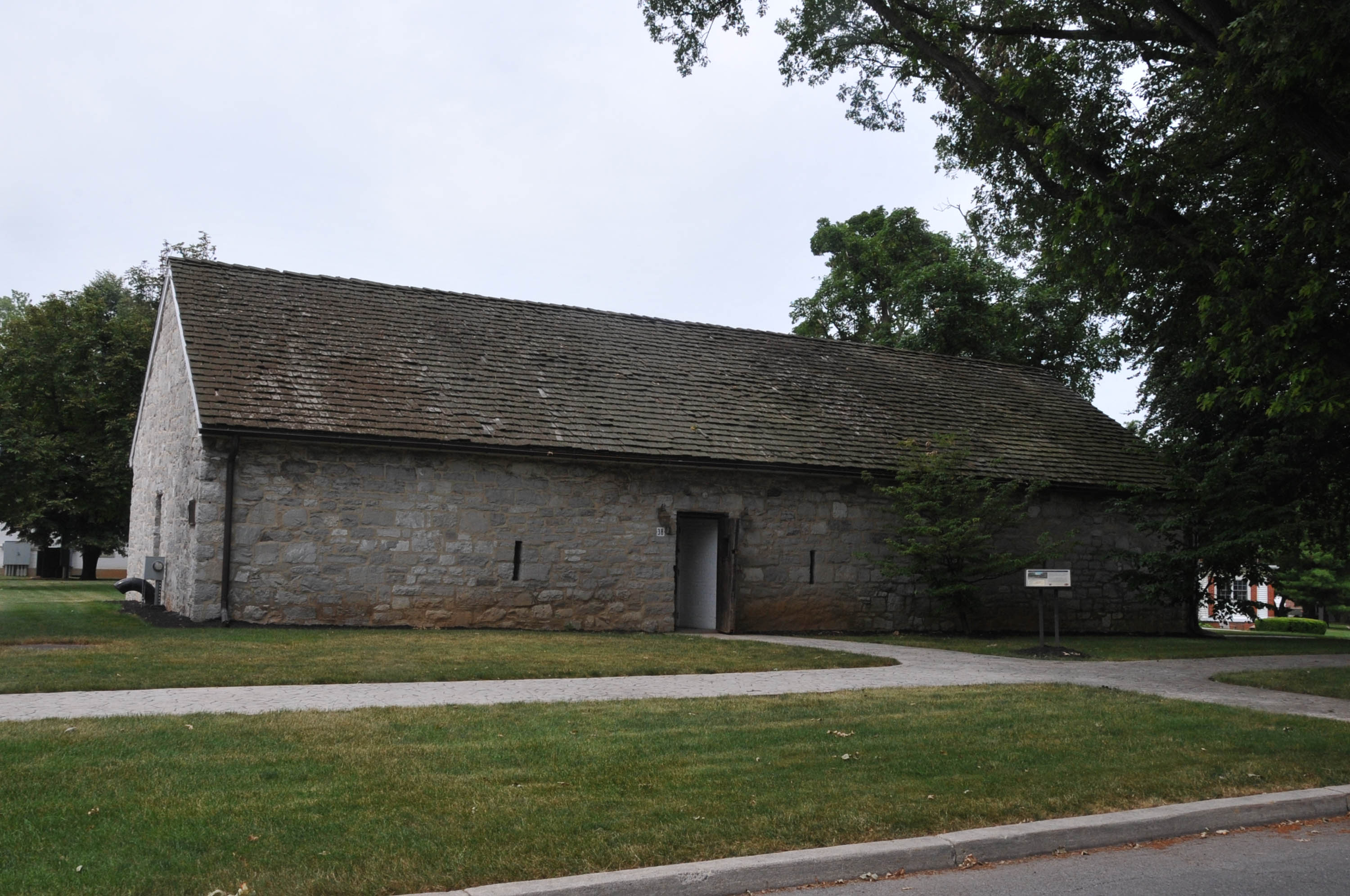
- Hessian Powder Magazine, June 2011

- Location within Pennsylvania Location within the United States
- Location: Guardhouse and Garrison Lanes, Carlisle, Pennsylvania
- Coordinates: 40°11′52″N 77°10′42″W
- Area: 0.2 acres (0.081 ha)
- Built: 1757
- Built by: Hessian Prisoners of War
- NRHP reference No.: 74001778
- Added to NRHP: May 17, 1974

The Hessian Powder Magazine, also known as the Hessian Guardhouse Museum, is an historic guardhouse and gunpowder magazine which is located on the grounds of the Carlisle Barracks in Carlisle, Cumberland County, Pennsylvania.

== History and architectural features ==
Built in 1777, the Hessian Powder Magazine is a stone walled structure, which is lined with interior brick. It measures seventy feet by thirty-two feet with walls that are four-and-one-half-feet thick. It also has a vaulted stone roof, which is covered by timbers and tin, creating a gable form. Tradition says that Hessian prisoners of war, who were captured during the Battle of Trenton were sent to Carlisle, and used to build this guard house, which was originally a magazine. It may have first been used as a guardhouse during the 1870s, and also as part of the Carlisle Indian Industrial School (1879–1918). Afterwards, it was used as a quartermaster and medical supply storehouse, filmstrip laboratory, message center, and U.S. post office.

== Importance ==
It was designated a museum in 1948.

It was added to the National Register of Historic Places in 1974.
