= Carlisle Area School District =

School district in Pennsylvania

Coordinates: 40.20994°N 77.20727°W

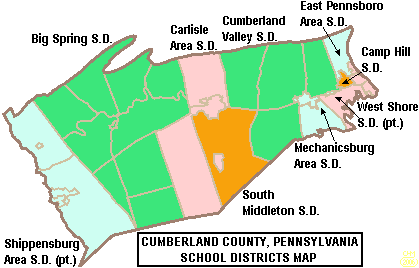

Address
- 623 West Penn Street Carlisle, Cumberland County, Pennsylvania, 17013; United States

District information
- Type: Public

Students and staff
- District mascot: Thundering Herd; Bison

Other information
- Website: www.carlisleschools.org

The Carlisle Area School District is a midsized, suburban, public school district that serves the boroughs of Carlisle and Mount Holly Springs, and Dickinson Township and North Middleton Township in Cumberland County, Pennsylvania. Carlisle Area School District encompasses approximately 75 square miles (190 km^{2}). According to 2000 federal census data, it serves a resident population of 34,794. in 2009, the residents' per capita income was $22,214, while the districts' median family income was $52,276.

Carlisle Area School District operates ten schools, including Carlisle High School, Lamberton Middle School, Wilson Middle School, Bellaire Elementary School, Crestview Elementary School, Hamilton Elementary School, LeTort Elementary School, Mooreland Elementary School, Mount Holly Springs Elementary School and North Dickinson Elementary School. The district is served by the Capital Area Intermediate Unit 15 which offers a variety of services, including a completely developed K-12 curriculum that is mapped and aligned with the Pennsylvania Academic Standards (available online), shared services, a group purchasing program and a wide variety of special education and special needs services.

The district includes the Carlisle Barracks census-designated place as well as most of the Schlusser census-designated place.

Carlisle Area School District plans to close Mount Holly Springs Elementary School and Letort Elementary School at the end of the 2027-2028 school year, as part of their long-term goal to expand and consolidate.

== Extracurriculars ==
Carlisle Area School District offers a wide variety of extracurriculars, including clubs, organizations and an extensive sports program. The district's varsity and junior varsity athletic activities are under the Pennsylvania Interscholastic Athletic Association.

=== Sports ===
The district funds:

Boys

- Baseball - AAAA
- Basketball- AAAA
- Cross Country - Class AAA
- Football - AAAA
- Golf -AAA
- Indoor Track and Field
- Lacrosse - AAAA
- Soccer - AAA
- Swimming and Diving - Class AAA
- Tennis - AAA
- Track and Field - AAA
- Volleyball - Class AAA
- Wrestling - AAA

Girls

- Basketball - AA
- Cross Country - AAA
- Field Hockey - AAA
- Indoor Track and Field - AAA
- Lacrosse - AAA
- Soccer (Fall) - AAA
- Softball - AAA
- Swimming and Diving - AAA
- Girls' Tennis - AA
- Track and Field - AAA
- Volleyball - AAA
- Field Hockey - AA

Middle School Sports

Boys

- Basketball
- Cross Country
- Soccer
- Wrestling

Girls

- Basketball
- Cross Country
- Field Hockey
- Softball (Fall)
- Volleyball

According to PIAA directory July 2012
