= Caprivi, Pennsylvania =

Unincorporated community in Pennsylvania, US

- Unincorporated community
- Location within Pennsylvania
- Coordinates: 40°14′38″N 77°13′54″W
- Country: United States
- State: Pennsylvania
- County: Cumberland
- Township: North Middleton
- Elevation: 482 ft (147 m)
- Time zone: UTC-5 (Eastern (EST))
  - Summer (DST): UTC-4 (EDT)
- Area code: 717
- GNIS feature ID: 1171184

Caprivi is an unincorporated community located in North Middleton Township, Cumberland County, Pennsylvania, United States. Situated on Pennsylvania Route 74 north of Carlisle, the community is an agricultural enclave.
