= Bloserville, Pennsylvania =

Unincorporated community in Pennsylvania, US

Coordinates: 40.240086°N 77.362207°W

Bloserville is an unincorporated community in Upper Frankford Township, Cumberland County, Pennsylvania, United States. Bloser is located on Enola Road (Pennsylvania Route 944).

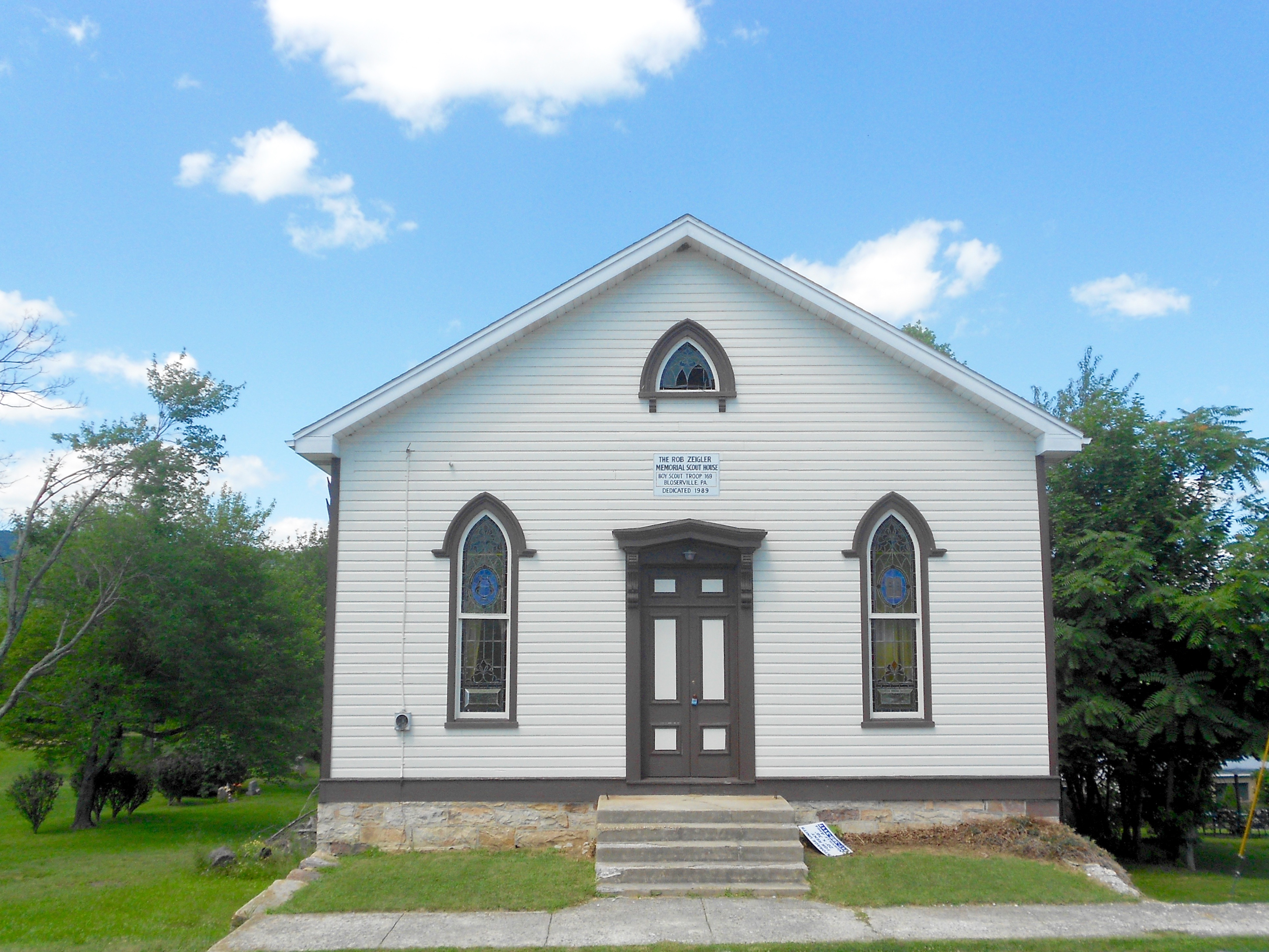
Zeigler Memorial Scout House

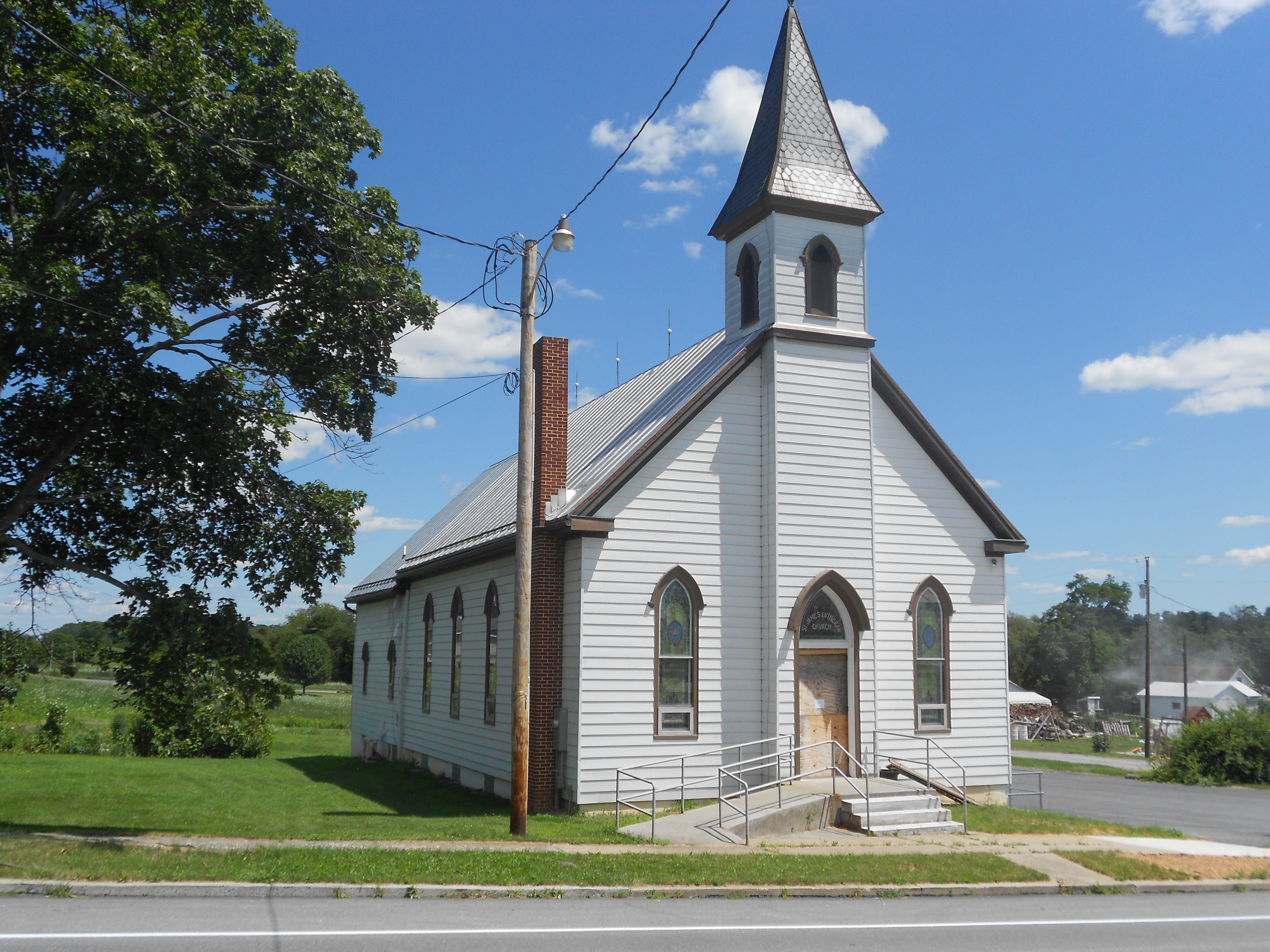
The former St. James Lutheran Church
