= Albert Masland =

American politician

Albert H. Masland

Member of the Pennsylvania House of Representatives from the 199th district
- In office January 5, 1993 – November 30, 2000
- Preceded by: John Broujos
- Succeeded by: Will Gabig

Personal details
- Born: September 18, 1956 (age 70) Carlisle, Pennsylvania
- Party: Republican
- Spouse: Deborah
- Education: Dickinson College; The Dickinson School of Law
- Occupation: Legislator-Attorney

Albert H. Masland (born September 18, 1956) is a former Republican member of the Pennsylvania House of Representatives.

== Biography ==
Masland graduated from the Peddie School in 1974. He earned a degree from Dickinson College in 1979 and a law degree from The Dickinson School of Law in 1982.

From 1986–1992, he served as an Assistant District Attorney in Cumberland County, Pennsylvania. He was sworn in as a member of the Pennsylvania House of Representatives representing the 199th legislative district in 1993. He held that position until his retirement prior to the 2000 general election.

From 2001 through 2002, Masland served as Commissioner of the Bureau of Professional and Occupational Affairs for the Pennsylvania Department of State, where he oversaw the Bureau's day-to-day functions. From 2002–2003, he served as the Inspector General of Pennsylvania, where he led the Department of State's search for evidence of impropriety within Pennsylvania's executive agencies and the welfare program. He then served as Chief Counsel for the Pennsylvania Department of Conservation and Natural Resources. He was appointed Chief Counsel to the Pennsylvania Department of State on January 10, 2005, where his duties included supervising a 50-person legal staff and serving as the primary legal advisor to the Secretary of the Commonwealth of Pennsylvania.
