= J. H. Hamilton =

Professional baseball player

- Infielder
- Born: December 20, 1897; Atlanta, Georgia, U.S.
- Died: November 11, 1965 (aged 67); Wills Point, Texas, U.S.
- Threw: Right

Negro league baseball debut
- 1924, for the Washington Potomacs

Last appearance
- 1927, for the Birmingham Black Barons
- Stats at Baseball Reference

Teams
- Washington Potomacs (1924–1925); Indianapolis ABCs (1925); Cleveland Elites (1926); Birmingham Black Barons (1927)

John H. Hamilton (December 20, 1897 – November 11, 1965) was an American Negro league infielder in the 1920s.

Hamilton made his Negro leagues debut in 1924 with the Washington Potomacs. He went on to play for the Indianapolis ABCs and Cleveland Elites, and finished his career in 1927 with the Birmingham Black Barons.
