= John H. Hamilton Jr. =

American politician (1919–1986)

Member of the Pennsylvania House of Representatives from the 199th district
- In office January 7, 1965 – November 30, 1978
- Preceded by: District Created
- Succeeded by: Joe Rocks

Member of the Pennsylvania House of Representatives from the Philadelphia County district
- In office 1965–1968

Personal details
- Born: February 9, 1919 Philadelphia, Pennsylvania, US
- Died: August 10, 1986 (aged 67) Somers Point, New Jersey, US
- Party: Republican

John H. Hamilton Jr. (February 9, 1919 – August 10, 1986) was a Republican member of the Pennsylvania House of Representatives. He served six consecutive terms and was not a candidate for re-election to the House for a 1979 term.
