= Middlesex Township, Cumberland County, Pennsylvania =

Township in Pennsylvania, US

Coordinates: 40°13′00″N 77°06′59″W

- Township
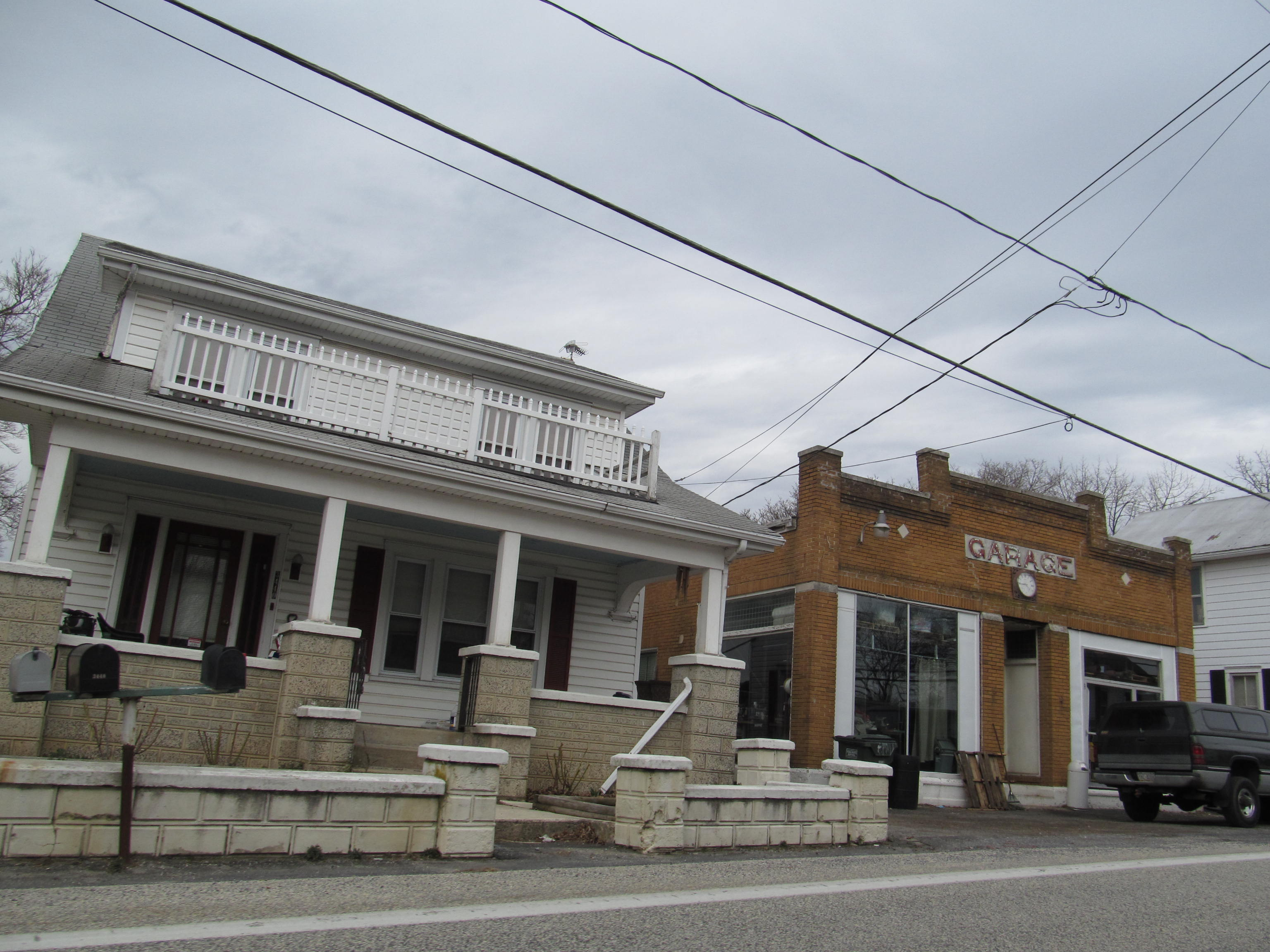
- Carlisle Springs is at a crossroads in the township on Pennsylvania Route 34 northeast of Carlisle.

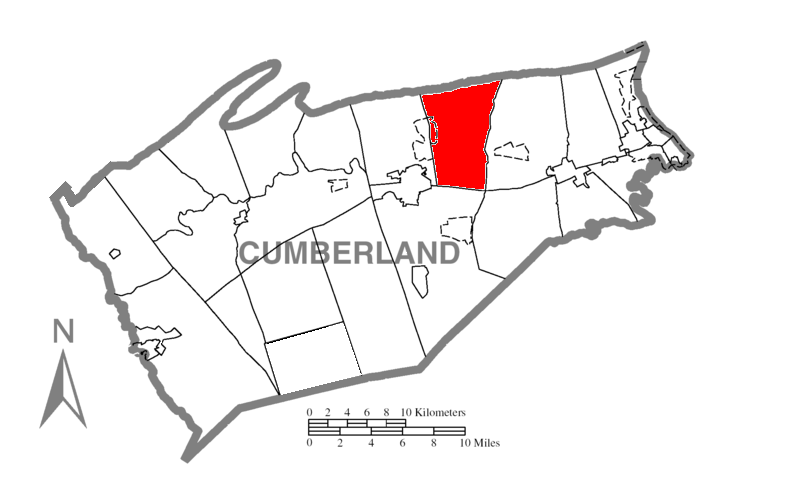
- Map of Cumberland County, Pennsylvania highlighting Middlesex Township

- Map of Cumberland County, Pennsylvania
- Country: United States
- State: Pennsylvania
- County: Cumberland

Government
  - Type: Board of Supervisors

Area
  - Total: 25.97 sq mi (67.25 km^{2})
  - Land: 25.69 sq mi (66.54 km^{2})
  - Water: 0.27 sq mi (0.70 km^{2})

Population (2010)
  - Total: 7,040
  - Estimate (2016): 7,367
  - Density: 286.7/sq mi (110.71/km^{2})
- Time zone: UTC-5 (Eastern (EST))
  - Summer (DST): UTC-4 (EDT)
- Area code: 717
- FIPS code: 42-041-49072
- Website: middlesextwp.com

Historical population
Census	Pop.	Note	%±
2000	6,669		—
2010	7,040		5.6%
2016 (est.)	7,367		4.6%
U.S. Decennial Census

Middlesex Township is a township located in Cumberland County, Pennsylvania, United States. As of the 2010 census, the township had a total population of 7,040.

A portion of the Carlisle Barracks property is in the township.

== Geography ==
Middlesex Township is in northeastern Cumberland County, bordered to the north by Perry County along the crest of Blue Mountain. Conodoguinet Creek, a tributary of the Susquehanna River, crosses the center of the township. Unincorporated communities in the township include Donnellytown in the northeast, Carlisle Springs in the northwest, and part of the Schlusser census-designated place along the western border.

Interstate 76 (the Pennsylvania Turnpike), Interstate 81, and U.S. Route 11 cross in a triangle formation near the center of the township. There is no direct access between I-76 and I-81; instead, a 1-mile (1.6 km) stretch of US 11 connects Exit 226 on I-76 with Exit 52 on I-81. The borough of Carlisle, the county seat, is approximately 4 miles (6 km) southwest of the highway crossing area via US 11, and Harrisburg, the state capital, is about 16 miles (26 km) to the east.

The Appalachian Trail crosses the northern half of the Cumberland Valley following a route near the eastern border of Middlesex Township.

According to the United States Census Bureau, the township has a total area of 25.9 square miles (67.2 km^{2}), of which 25.7 square miles (66.5 km^{2}) is land and 0.27 square miles (0.7 km^{2}), or 1.05%, is water.

== Demographics ==
As of the census of 2000, there were 6,669 people, 2,298 households, and 1,730 families residing in the township. The population density was 257.2 inhabitants per square mile (99.3/km^{2}). There were 2,392 housing units at an average density of 92.3 units per square mile (35.6 units/km^{2}). The racial makeup of the township was 95.98% White, 1.50% African American, 0.10% Native American, 0.79% Asian, 0.04% Pacific Islander, 0.43% from other races, and 1.14% from two or more races. 1.26% of the population were Hispanic or Latino of any race.

There were 2,298 households, out of which 35.6% had children under the age of 18 living with them, 63.3% were married couples living together, 8.0% had a female householder with no husband present, and 24.7% were non-families. 20.0% of all households were made up of individuals, and 7.0% had someone living alone who was 65 years of age or older. The average household size was 2.61 and the average family size was 3.01.

In the township the population was spread out, with 23.7% under the age of 18, 6.8% from 18 to 24, 31.5% from 25 to 44, 24.5% from 45 to 64, and 13.5% who were 65 years of age or older. The median age was 39 years. For every 100 females, there were 105.0 males. For every 100 females age 18 and over, there were 101.3 males.

The median income for a household in the township was $50,471, and the median income for a family was $59,250. Males had a median income of $36,985 versus $24,554 for females. The per capita income for the township was $24,902. 5.7% of the population and 4.1% of families were below the poverty line. Out of the total population, 10.0% of those under the age of 18 and 4.6% of those 65 and older were living below the poverty line.

== Education ==
The school district is Cumberland Valley School District.
