= Cumberland Valley =

Constituent valley in the Great Appalachian Valley

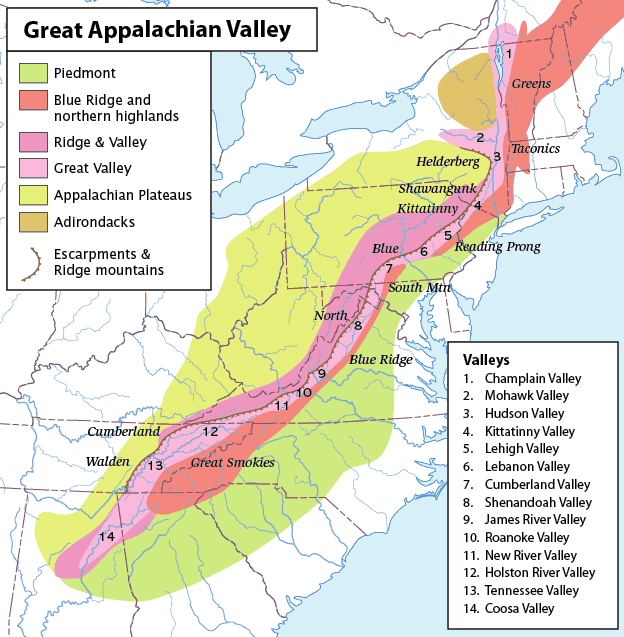
- The Great Appalachian Valley includes the Cumberland Valley (7) depicted southeast of the Ridge-and-Valley Appalachians and between the Lebanon (6) and Shenandoah (8) valleys.

- Location within Pennsylvania
- Floor elevation: 600 ft (180 m)
- Length: 73 miles (117 km) northeast-southwest
- Width: 12 miles (19 km)

Geography
- Location: Cumberland County, Pennsylvania; Franklin County, Pennsylvania; Washington County, Maryland
- Population centers: In Pennsylvania: Harrisburg, Carlisle, Mechanicsburg, Shippensburg, Chambersburg, Greencastle, Waynesboro; In Maryland: Hagerstown
- Borders on: Ridge-and-Valley Appalachians (west/north); South Mountain (east/south); Susquehanna River (east); Potomac River (south)
- Coordinates: 39°56′N 77°43′W
- Interactive map of Cumberland Valley

The Cumberland Valley is a northern constituent valley of the Great Appalachian Valley, within the Atlantic Seaboard watershed in Pennsylvania and Maryland. The Appalachian Trail crosses through the valley.

== Geography ==
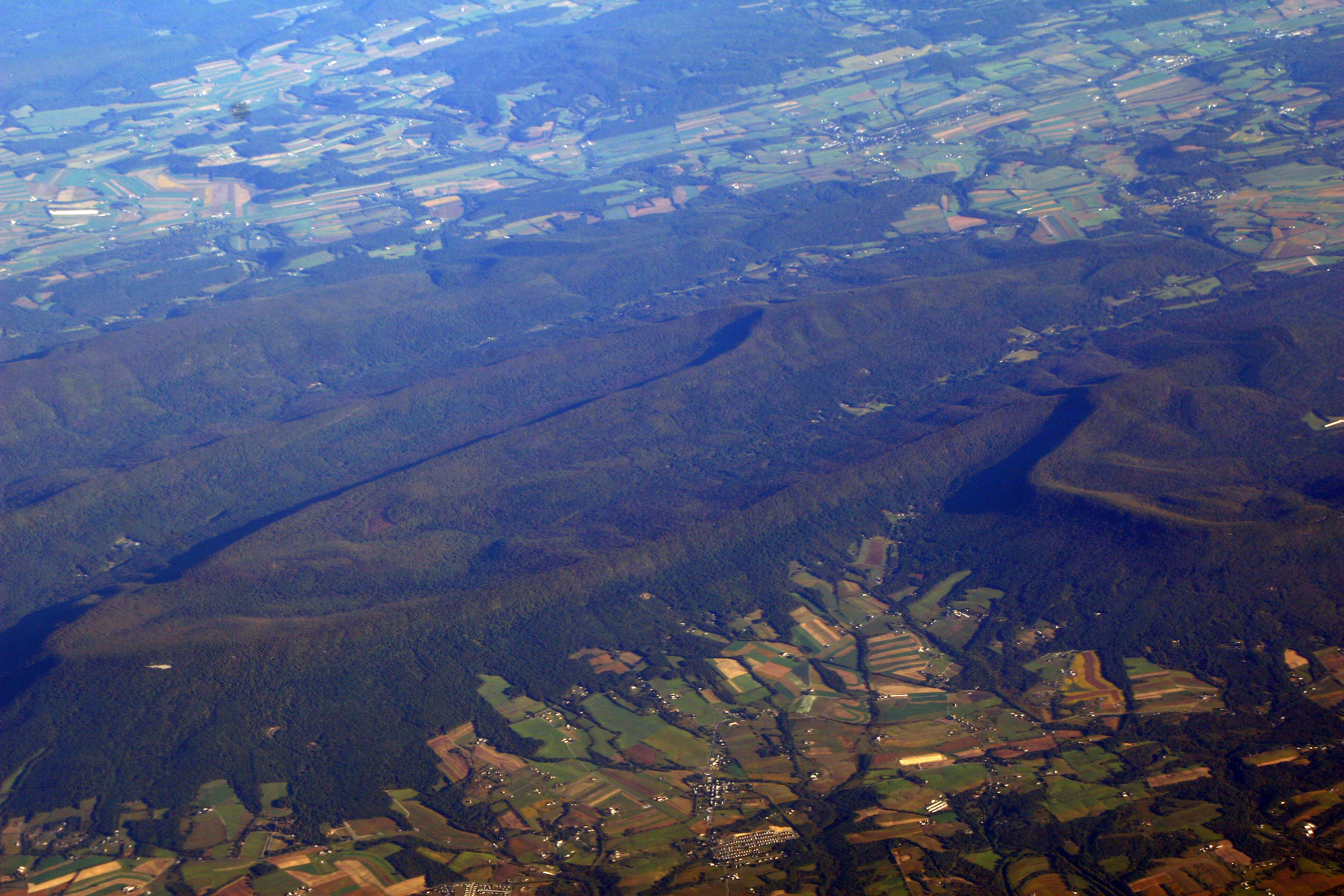
Aerial view of a portion of the Ridge-and-Valley Appalachians forming the northern edge of the Cumberland Valley. Named features in image include Flat Rock, Mount Dempsey, Bloserville, and Bowers Mountain.

The valley is bound to the west and north by the Ridge-and-Valley Appalachians (Bear Pond Mountains/Blue Mountain), to the east and south by South Mountain, to the northeast by the Susquehanna River at Harrisburg, and to the south by the Potomac River. The portion of the valley residing in Maryland is sometimes referred to as the Hagerstown Valley.

The Cumberland Valley Railroad, the Cumberland Valley AVA wine region, and the Cumberland Valley School District are named for the region.

== Settlements ==
Cities in the Cumberland Valley include Harrisburg, Pennsylvania, and Hagerstown, Maryland. Pennsylvania boroughs include Camp Hill, Mechanicsburg, Carlisle, Shippensburg, Chambersburg, Waynesboro, and Greencastle.

== Gallery ==
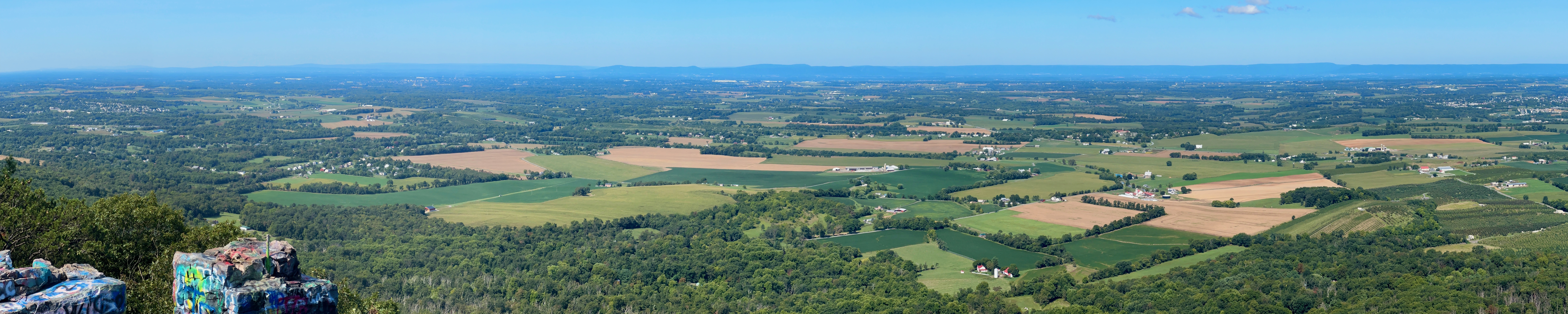
View from High Rock of the Cumberland Valley

== See also ==
- Great Appalachian Valley
