= Schmitt (surname) =

Schmitt is a German surname. Notable people with the surname include:

== A–K ==
- Adam Schmitt (born 1968), American singer/songwriter
- Adolph Schmitt (1905–1976), German prelate of the Roman Catholic Church
- Al Schmitt (1930–2021), American recorded music engineer
- Alain Schmitt (born 1983), French judoka
- Alfred Schmitt (1907–1973), French astronomer
- Allison Schmitt (born 1990), American Olympic swimmer
- Aloys Schmitt (1788–1866), German composer, pianist and music teacher
- Father Aloysius Schmitt (1909–1941), Roman Catholic priest who died at Pearl Harbor
- Alphonse Schmitt (1875–1912), French organist and composer
- Ana Carolina Schmitt (born 1990), Brazilian jiu-jitsu black belt competitor
- Antoine Schmitt (born 1961), French artist, programming engineer and designer
- Anton Schmitt (died 1916), German sailor killed during World War I
- Arnd Schmitt (born 1965), German fencer and Olympic champion
- Artur Schmitt (disambiguation), multiple people
- Bernadotte Everly Schmitt (1886–1969), American historian
- Bernard Schmitt (disambiguation), multiple people
- Bernd Schmitt (born 1957), American scholar in marketing and business psychology
- Bertram Schmitt (born 1958), German jurist
- Bill Schmitt (1936–2014), American stock car racing driver
- Carl Schmitt (1888-1985), German fascist
- Carlos Schmitt (1919–2006), Brazilian Catholic prelate
- Casey Schmitt (born 1999), American baseball player for the San Francisco Giants
- Chester Ludwig Schmitt (1912–1993), Pennsylvania legislator
- Christine Schmitt (born 1953), German retired gymnast
- Christopher Schmitt (1975–2020), American web designer
- Colin Schmitt (born 1990), American businessman and politician
- Conrad Schmitt (1867–1940), American artist and founder of Conrad Schmitt Studios in Wisconsin
- Cornel Schmitt (1874–1958), German pedagogue, naturalist, music composer, and writer
- Daniela Schmitt (born 1972), German politician (FDP)
- Daryl Schmitt, American politician
- David P. Schmitt, American psychologist
- Dennis Schmitt (born 1960), American explorer
- Dennis Schmitt (footballer) (born 1993), German footballer
- Dieter Schmitt (born 1940), German fencer
- Dominik Schmitt (born 1992), German footballer
- Donald Schmitt (born 1951), Canadian architect
- Dorado Schmitt (born 1957), French guitarist and violinist
- Edgar Schmitt (born 1963), retired German football player
- Egon Schmitt (born 1948), German footballer
- Eleonora Schmitt (born 1931), Brazilian swimmer
- Elisabeth Schmitt (1891–1974), German-American lawyer
- Else Schmitt (1921–1995), German politician
- Eric Schmitt (disambiguation)
- Erich Schmitt (1912–1979), Swiss field handball player
- Ernesto Schmitt (born 1972), American-born entrepreneur and investor
- Fabian Schmitt (born 1992), German Greco-Roman wrestler
- Florent Schmitt (1870–1958), French composer
- Francis O. Schmitt (1903–1995), American scientist
- Franz Schmitt (born 1937), German wrestler
- Frauke Schmitt Gran (born 1969), German orienteer
- Frieda Schmitt-Lermann (1885-?), German composer
- Gary Schmitt (born 1952), American neo conservative political analyst
- Gavin Schmitt (born 1986), Canadian former volleyball player
- Georg Schmitt (1821–1900), French composer and organist
- George Schmitt (born 1961), American former football player
- Gladys Schmitt (1909–1972), American writer, editor, and college professor
- Graziella Schmitt (born 1981), Brazilian actress
- Harrison Schmitt (born 1935), American former astronaut and New Mexico Senator; twelfth man to walk on the Moon
- Heinrich Schmitt (1895–1951), German politician
- Hélène Schmitt, prize-winning French violinist
- Henri Schmitt (1926–1982), Swiss politician
- Hugo Schmitt (1904-1977), German-American elephant trainer
- Ingo Schmitt (born 1957), German politician
- Isolde Schmitt-Menzel (1930–2022), German designer, author, illustrator, graphist and ceramist
- Jacob Schmitt (1803–1853), German composer and piano teacher
- Janine Schmitt (born 2000), Swiss alpine skier
- Janis Schmitt (born 1947), American model and actress
- Jason Schmitt (born 1976), American journalist, documentary producer and professor
- Jean-Claude Schmitt (born 1946), French medievalist
- Jerry Schmitt (born 1960), American football coach and former player
- Jim Schmitt (born 1958), American politician from Wisconsin
- Johan Schmitt (1881–1955), Dutch gymnast
- Johanna Schmitt, American ecologist
- Johannes Schmitt (1943–2003), German athlete
- John Schmitt (disambiguation), multiple people
- Joseph Schmitt (disambiguation), multiple people
- Joshua Schmitt (born 1998), German politician
- Julie Schmitt (1913–2002), German Olympic gymnast
- Jürgen Schmitt (disambiguation), multiple people
- Justin Schmitt (born 1974), Australian rules football field umpire
- Jutta Schmitt-Lang (born 1982), German politician
- Klaus Schmitt (1940–2025), American mathematician
- Kurt Schmitt (1886–1950), German economic leader

== L–Z ==
- Logan Giulietti-Schmitt (born 1985), American ice dancer
- Louis Schmitt Jr. (born 1962), American attorney and politician
- Ludwig Schmitt (1902–1980), German chess master
- Ludwig Schmitt (footballer) (1910–after 1941), German footballer
- Mark Schmitt, American political scientist and author
- Mark Francis Schmitt (1923–2011), American Roman Catholic bishop
- Martin Schmitt (born 1978), German ski jumper
- Matías Schmitt (born 1991), Argentine snowboarder
- Maurice Schmitt (born 1930), French soldier
- Max Schmitt (disambiguation), multiple people
- Michael N. Schmitt (born 1956), American law scholar
- Michelle Schmitt, American singer-songwriter and music producer
- Morgan Schmitt (born 1985), American road bicycle racing cyclist
- Neal Schmitt, American psychologist
- Nicolas Schmitt (born 1936), Luxembourgish footballer
- Norbert Schmitt (born 1956), British linguist
- Odile Schmitt (1956–2020), French actress
- Oliver Schmitt (born 1973), Swiss historian and professor
- Oliver Schmitt (footballer) (born 2000), German footballer
- Otto Schmitt (1913–1998), American inventor and biophysicist
- Otto Schmitt (field hockey) (born 1965), Argentine field hockey goalkeeper
- Owen Schmitt (born 1985), American football player
- Pál Schmitt (born 1942), ex-president of Hungary
- Pete Schmitt (born 1984), American football fullback
- Peter J. Schmitt (1950–2012), American politician from New York
- Petra Schmitt (born 1971), Hungarian tennis player
- Philipp Schmitt (1902–1950), German SS commandant of Nazi prison camp executed for war crimes
- Pierre Schmitt (born 1965), French ice hockey player
- Ralf Schmitt (born 1977), German football player
- Ricky Schmitt (born 1985), American football punter
- Rico Schmitt (born 1968), German football manager and former player
- Rob Schmitt (born 1986), American television journalist
- Rodolfo Schmitt (born 1974), Argentine retired field hockey player
- Roland Schmitt (disambiguation), multiple people
- Rudolf Schmitt (1830–1898), German chemist and co-discoverer of the Kolbe-Schmitt reaction
- Sally Schmitt (1932–2022), American restaurateur
- Sandra Schmitt (1981–2000), German freestyle skier
- Sebastian Schmitt (born 1996), German basketball player
- Sebastian Schmitt (politician) (born 1988), German politician
- Stefan Schmitt (disambiguation), multiple people
- Stephanie Schmitt-Grohe, German economist
- Susie Schmitt Hanson (1860–1956), American milliner, dressmaker and entrepreneur
- Suzanne Schmitt (1928–2019), French tennis player
- Sven Schmitt (born 1976), German football player
- Tate Schmitt (born 1997), American soccer player
- Tchavolo Schmitt (born 1954), guitarist in gypsy jazz
- Ted Schmitt (1916–2001), American football player
- Thilo Schmitt (born 1982), German slalom canoer
- Thorsten Schmitt (born 1975), German Olympic skier
- Tracy Schmitt, Canadian athlete and motivational speaker
- Tyler Schmitt (born 1986), American football long snapper
- Uwe Schmitt (1961–1995), German sprinter and hurdler
- Waldo L. Schmitt (1887–1977), American biologist
- Walfriede Schmitt (born 1943), German actress
- Walter Schmitt (1879–1945), German SS-Obergruppenführer and General of the Waffen-SS
- Walter Schmitt Glaeser (1933–2024), German politician and author
- Wolfgang Schmitt (1939–2017), German boxer
- Wolfram Schmitt-Leonardy, German musician and music educator

== See also ==
- Schmidt (disambiguation)
- Schmit, a surname
- Schmitt Brothers, barbershop quartet
- Schmitten (disambiguation)
