= Schmitt =

Schmitt may refer to:

- Schmitt (surname), a surname and list of people with the name
- Schmitt family, a noble Bavarian family
- Schmitt, Germany, a municipality in the Eifel area of the Rhineland-Palatinate state in western Germany
- Schmitt Music, an American retail company specialising in musical instruments, sheet music and accessories
- USS Schmitt (DE-676), a Buckley-class destroyer escort in the United States Navy

== See also ==
- Schmidt (disambiguation)
- Schmit, a surname
- Schmitt and Henry Manufacturing Company
- Schmitt Brothers, barbershop quartet
- Schmitt Gillenwater Kelly syndrome, an autosomal dominant syndrome
- Schmitt trigger, a type of comparator circuit in electronics
- Schmitten (disambiguation)
