= 2000 United States House of Representatives elections in Pennsylvania =

- November 7, 2000

All 21 Pennsylvania seats to the United States House of Representatives
	Majority party	Minority party
Party	Republican	Democratic
Last election	10	11
Seats won	11	10
Seat change	▲1	▼1
Popular vote	2,229,057	2,279,227
Percentage	48.90%	50.00%
Swing	▼1.94%	▲2.32%

Republican hold Republican gain
Democratic hold
Republican
50–60%
60–70%
70–80%
80–90%
>90%
Democratic
50–60%
60–70%
70–80%
80–90%
>90%

The 2000 United States House elections in Pennsylvania was an election for Pennsylvania's delegation to the United States House of Representatives, which occurred as part of the general election of the House of Representatives on November 7, 2000.

== Overview ==
United States House of Representatives elections in Pennsylvania, 2000
Party	Votes	Percentage	Seats Before	Seats After	+/–
Republican	2,229,057	48.90%	10	11	+1
Democratic	2,279,227	50.00%	11	10	-1
Libertarian	24,917	0.55%	0	0	0
Green	13,857	0.31%	0	0	0
Reform	8,718	0.19%	0	0	0
Constitution	2,234	0.05%	0	0	0
Totals	4,558,010	100.00%	21	21	–

== Match-up summary ==
District	Democratic		Republican		Others		Total		Result
District	Votes	%	Votes	%	Votes	%	Votes	%	Result
District 1	149,621	88.25%	19,920	11.75%	0	0.00%	169,541	100.00%	Democratic hold
District 2	180,021	98.00%	0	0.00%	3,673	2.00%	183,694	100.00%	Democratic hold
District 3	130,528	68.75%	59,343	31.25%	0	0.00%	189,871	100.00%	Democratic hold
District 4	100,995	40.99%	145,390	59.01%	0	0.00%	246,385	100.00%	Republican gain
District 5	0	0.00%	147,570	82.70%	30,877	17.30%	178,447	100.00%	Republican hold
District 6	140,084	66.29%	71,227	33.71%	0	0.00%	211,311	100.00%	Democratic hold
District 7	93,687	35.19%	172,569	64.81%	0	0.00%	266,256	100.00%	Republican hold
District 8	100,617	38.68%	154,090	59.24%	5,394	2.08%	260,101	100.00%	Republican hold
District 9	0	0.00%	184,401	100.00%	0	0.00%	184,401	100.00%	Republican hold
District 10	112,580	47.42%	124,830	52.58%	0	0.00%	237,410	100.00%	Republican hold
District 11	131,948	66.42%	66,699	33.58%	0	0.00%	198,647	100.00%	Democratic hold
District 12	145,538	70.84%	56,575	27.54%	3,324	1.62%	205,437	100.00%	Democratic hold
District 13	146,026	52.76%	126,501	45.71%	4,224	1.53%	276,751	100.00%	Democratic hold
District 14	147,533	100.00%	0	0.00%	0	0.00%	147,533	100.00%	Democratic hold
District 15	103,864	46.75%	118,307	53.25%	0	0.00%	222,171	100.00%	Republican hold
District 16	80,177	33.05%	162,403	66.95%	0	0.00%	242,580	100.00%	Republican hold
District 17	66,190	28.48%	166,236	71.52%	0	0.00%	232,426	100.00%	Republican hold
District 18	156,131	69.41%	68,798	30.59%	0	0.00%	224,929	100.00%	Democratic hold
District 19	61,538	26.47%	168,722	72.57%	2,234	0.96%	232,494	100.00%	Republican hold
District 20	145,131	64.38%	80,312	35.62%	0	0.00%	225,443	100.00%	Democratic hold
District 21	87,018	39.17%	135,164	60.83%	0	0.00%	222,182	100.00%	Republican hold
Total	2,279,227	50.00%	2,229,057	48.90%	49,726	1.10%	4,558,010	100.00%	

Popular vote
Democratic	50.00%
Republican	48.90%
Other	1.10%

House seats
Democratic	47.62%
Republican	52.38%

== District 1 ==
2000 Pennsylvania's 1st congressional district election
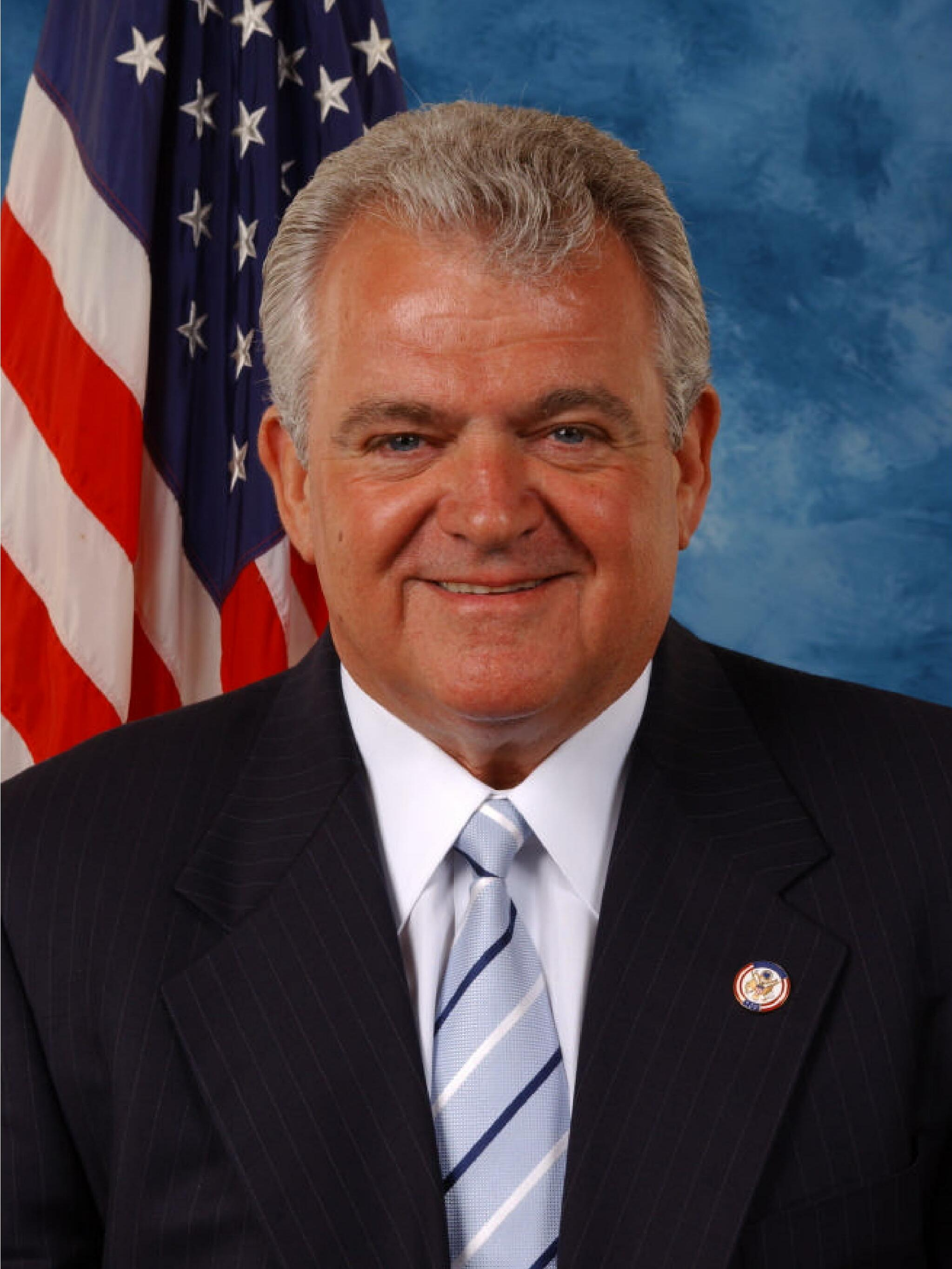

Nominee	Bob Brady	Steven Kush
Party	Democratic	Republican
Popular vote	149,621	19,920
Percentage	88.25%	11.75%
- County results Brady: 60–70% 90–100%
U.S. representative before election
Bob Brady
Democratic
Elected U.S. representative
Bob Brady
Democratic

=== Democratic primary ===
==== Candidates ====
===== Nominee =====
- Bob Brady, incumbent U.S. Representative

==== Eliminated in primary ====
- Andrew Carn, member of the Pennsylvania House of Representatives
- Timothy Hannah

==== Primary results ====
Democratic primary results
Party	Candidate	Votes	%
Democratic	Bob Brady (incumbent)	28,333	77.37
Democratic	Andrew Carn	6,346	17.33
Democratic	Timothy Hannah	1,943	5.30
Total votes		36,622	100.00

=== Republican primary ===
==== Candidates ====
===== Nominee =====
- Steven N. Kush

==== Primary results ====
Republican primary results
Party	Candidate	Votes	%
Republican	Steven N. Kush	4,585	100.00
Total votes		4,585	100.00

=== General election ===
General Election 2000: Pennsylvania's 1st congressional district
Party	Candidate	Votes	%
Democratic	Bob Brady (incumbent)	149,621	88.25
Republican	Steven N. Kush	19,920	11.75
Total votes		169,541	100.00

== District 2 ==
2000 Pennsylvania's 2nd congressional district election
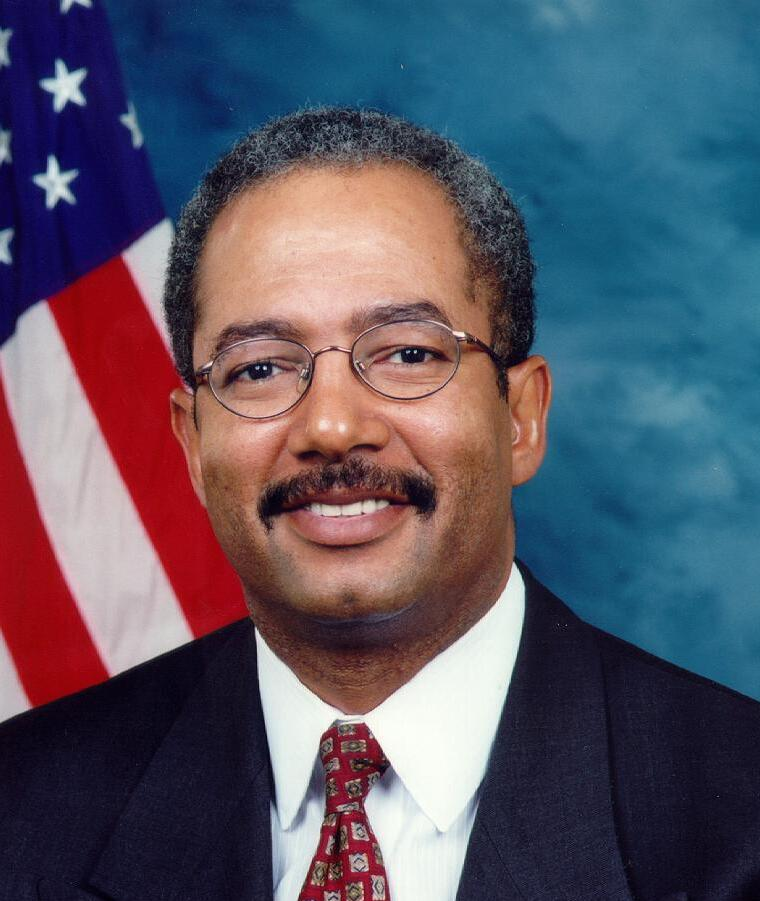

Nominee	Chaka Fattah	Kenneth Krawchuk
Party	Democratic	Libertarian
Popular vote	180,021	3,673
Percentage	98.00%	2.00%
- County results Fattah: 90–100%
U.S. representative before election
Chaka Fattah
Democratic
Elected U.S. representative
Chaka Fattah
Democratic

=== Democratic primary ===
==== Candidates ====
===== Nominee =====
- Chaka Fattah, incumbent U.S. Representative

==== Primary results ====
Democratic primary results
Party	Candidate	Votes	%
Democratic	Chaka Fattah (incumbent)	46,582	100.00
Total votes		46,582	100.00

=== General election ===
General Election 2000: Pennsylvania's 2nd congressional district
Party	Candidate	Votes	%
Democratic	Chaka Fattah	180,021	98.00
Libertarian	Kenneth V. Krawchuk	3,673	2.00
Total votes		183,694	100.00

== District 3 ==
2000 Pennsylvania's 3rd congressional district election
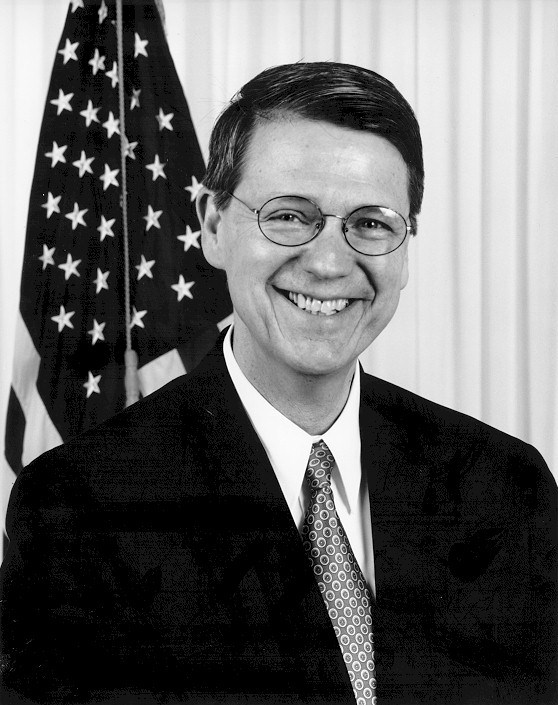

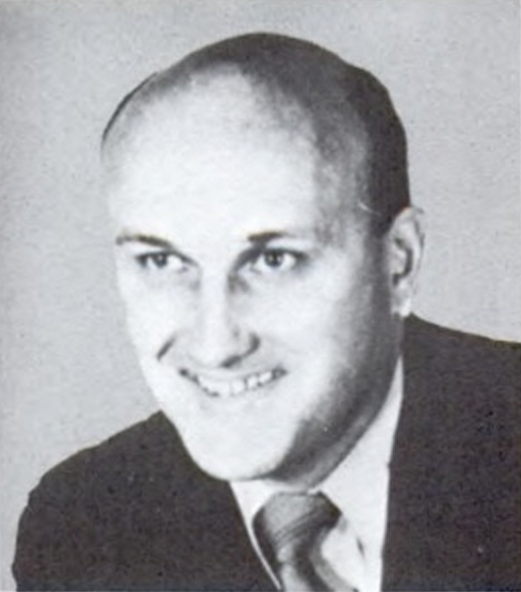
Nominee	Robert Borski	Charles F. Dougherty
Party	Democratic	Republican
Popular vote	130,528	59,343
Percentage	68.75%	31.25%
- County results Borski: 60–70%
U.S. representative before election
Robert Borski
Democratic
Elected U.S. representative
Robert Borski
Democratic

=== Democratic primary ===
==== Candidates ====
===== Nominee =====
- Robert Borski, incumbent U.S. Representative

==== Primary results ====
Democratic primary results
Party	Candidate	Votes	%
Democratic	Robert Borski (incumbent)	25,439	100.00
Total votes		25,439	100.00

=== Republican primary ===
==== Candidates ====
===== Nominee =====
- Charles F. Dougherty, former U.S. Representative

==== Primary results ====
Republican primary results
Party	Candidate	Votes	%
Republican	Charles F. Dougherty	9,945	100.00
Total votes		9,945	100.00

=== General election ===
General Election 2000: Pennsylvania's 3rd congressional district
Party	Candidate	Votes	%
Democratic	Robert Borski (incumbent)	130,528	68.75
Republican	Charles F. Dougherty	59,343	31.25
Total votes		189,871	100.00

== District 4 ==
2000 Pennsylvania's 4th congressional district election
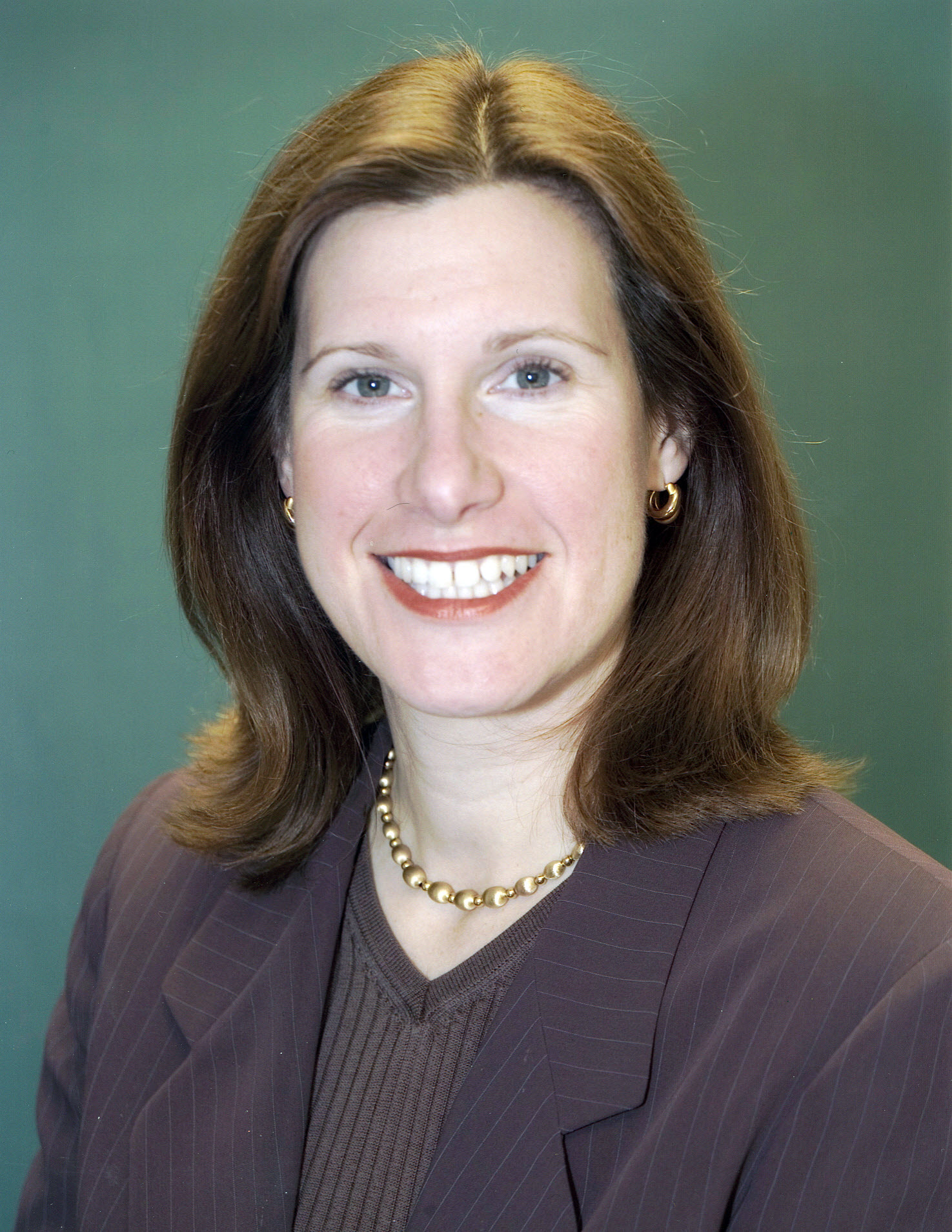

Nominee	Melissa Hart	Terry Van Horne
Party	Republican	Democratic
Popular vote	145,390	100,995
Percentage	59.01%	40.99%
- County results Hart: 50–60% 60–70% 70–80%
U.S. representative before election
Ron Klink
Democratic
Elected U.S. representative
Melissa Hart
Republican

Prior to the 2000 election, Democratic Congressman Ron Klink vacated Pennsylvania's 4th congressional district to challenge Republican Rick Santorum for the United States Senate. Pennsylvania State Senator Melissa Hart won the Republican nomination unopposed. State Representative Terry Van Horne won an 8-way primary election to win the Democratic nomination. Van Horne defeated the state and national party's preferred candidate, Matthew Mangino, the Lawrence County, Pennsylvania district attorney. Shortly after Van Horne's victory, the National Republican Congressional Committee began re-circulating 1994 newspaper accounts alleging that he had been overheard using a racial slur in the halls of the Pennsylvania State Capitol to describe fellow State Representative Dwight E. Evans, who was opposing reduction in welfare.

The race was expected to be a close one, with accusations of illegal phone calls, stolen signs, and misleading mailers sent to constituents. Surrogates for both candidates, funded with soft money, aired television advertisements throughout the Western Pennsylvania district. National dignitaries, including Republican Senator John McCain and Democratic Congressman Patrick J. Kennedy of Rhode Island, visited the area to advocate for their party's candidates. In the end, Hart won the district with 59% of the vote.

=== Democratic primary ===
==== Candidates ====
===== Nominee =====
- Terry Van Horne, member of the Pennsylvania House of Representatives

==== Eliminated in primary ====
- Joe Bellissimo
- Royal Hart
- Jerry Hodge
- Jack Machek
- Matthew Mangino, district attorney of Lawrence County
- Jim Rooker
- Jim Schmitt

==== Primary results ====
Democratic primary results
Party	Candidate	Votes	%
Democratic	Terry Van Horne	14,862	23.54
Democratic	Matthew Mangino	9,580	15.18
Democratic	Jerry Hodge	9,022	14.29
Democratic	Jim Rooker	8,226	13.03
Democratic	Jack Machek	6,680	10.58
Democratic	Joe Bellissimo	6,318	10.01
Democratic	Royal Hart	5,519	8.74
Democratic	Jim Schmitt	2,921	4.63
Total votes		63,128	100.00

=== Republican primary ===
==== Candidates ====
===== Nominee =====
- Melissa Hart, member of the Pennsylvania State Senate

==== Primary results ====
Republican primary results
Party	Candidate	Votes	%
Republican	Melissa Hart	24,142	100.00
Total votes		24,142	100.00

=== General election ===
==== Polling ====
Poll source	Date(s)	Sample size	Margin of error	Melissa Hart (R)	Terry Van Horne (D)	Other / undecided (Note: Calculated by taking the difference of 100% and all other candidates combined.)
Decision Forecasting	October 26, 2000	426	—	44%	36%	20%
SurveyUSA	October 23, 2000	800	—	51%	44%	5%
Dynamics Marketing	October 22, 2000	416	—	49%	34%	17%

==== Results ====
General Election 2000: Pennsylvania's 4th congressional district
Party	Candidate	Votes	%
Republican	Melissa Hart	145,390	59.01
Democratic	Terry Van Horne	100,995	40.99
Total votes		246,385	100.00

== District 5 ==
2000 Pennsylvania's 5th congressional district election
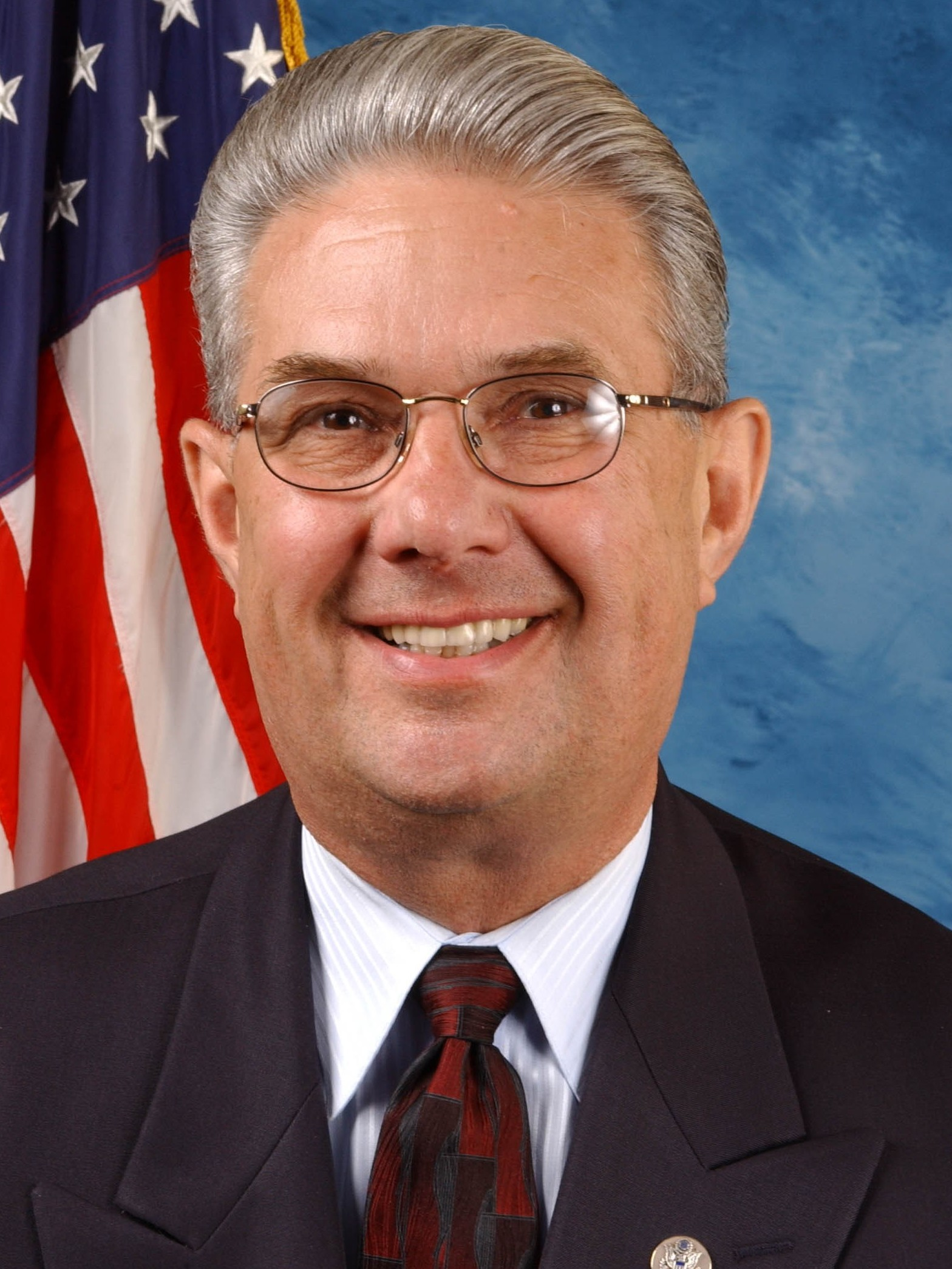

Nominee	John E. Peterson	Thomas Martin	William Belitskus
Party	Republican	Libertarian	Green
Popular vote	147,570	17,020	13,857
Percentage	82.70%	9.54%	7.76%
U.S. representative before election
John E. Peterson
Republican
Elected U.S. representative
John E. Peterson
Republican

=== Republican primary ===
==== Candidates ====
===== Nominee =====
- John E. Peterson, incumbent U.S. Representative

==== Primary results ====
Republican primary results
Party	Candidate	Votes	%
Republican	John E. Peterson (incumbent)	34,482	100.00
Total votes		34,482	100.00

=== General election ===
General Election 2000: Pennsylvania's 5th congressional district
Party	Candidate	Votes	%
Republican	John E. Peterson (incumbent)	147,570	82.70
Libertarian	Thomas A. Martin	17,020	9.54
Green	William M. Belitskus	13,857	7.76
Total votes		178,447	100.00

== District 6 ==
2000 Pennsylvania's 6th congressional district election
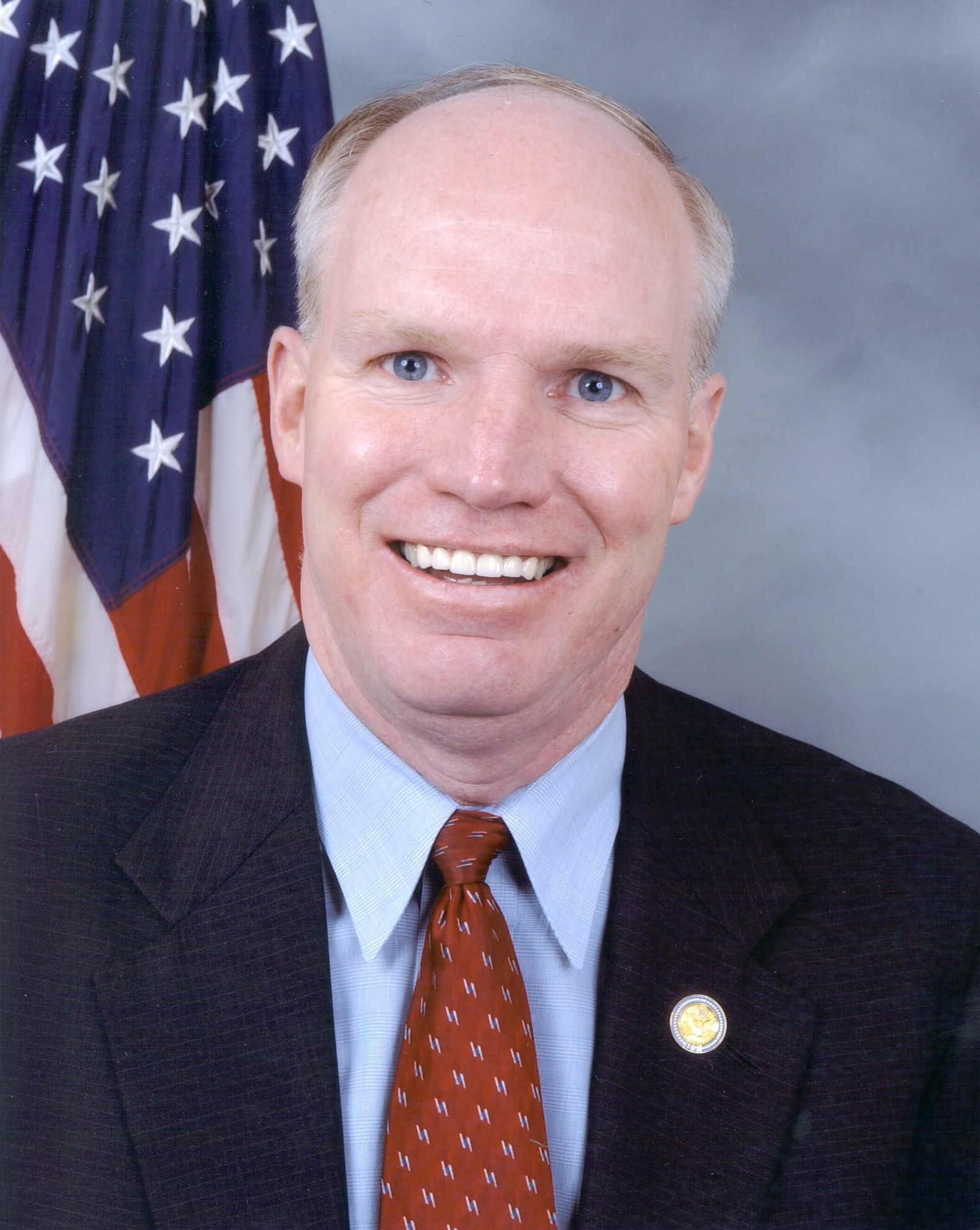

Nominee	Tim Holden	Thomas Kopel
Party	Democratic	Republican
Popular vote	140,084	71,227
Percentage	66.29%	33.71%
- County results Holden: 50–60% 60–70% 70–80%
U.S. representative before election
Tim Holden
Democratic
Elected U.S. representative
Tim Holden
Democratic

Incumbent Democratic Representative Tim Holden ran for re-election, defeating Republican Thomas Kopel.

=== Democratic primary ===
==== Nominee ====
- Tim Holden, incumbent U.S. Representative

==== Primary results ====
Democratic primary results
Party	Candidate	Votes	%
Democratic	Tim Holden	21,610	100.00
Total votes		21,610	100.00

=== Republican primary ===
==== Nominee ====
- Thomas G. Kopel

==== Primary results ====
Republican primary results
Party	Candidate	Votes	%
Republican	Thomas G. Kopel	19,861	100.00
Total votes		19,861	100.00

=== General election ===
General Election 2000: Pennsylvania's 6th congressional district
Party	Candidate	Votes	%
Democratic	Tim Holden (incumbent)	140,084	66.29
Republican	Thomas G. Kopel	71,227	33.71
Total votes		211,311	100.00

== District 7 ==
2000 Pennsylvania's 7th congressional district election
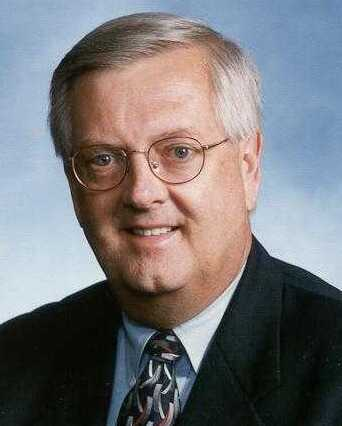

Nominee	Curt Weldon	Peter Lennon
Party	Republican	Democratic
Popular vote	172,569	93,687
Percentage	64.81%	35.19%
- County results Weldon: 50–60% 60–70%
U.S. representative before election
Curt Weldon
Republican
Elected U.S. representative
Curt Weldon
Republican

=== Democratic primary ===
==== Nominee ====
- Peter A. Lennon

==== Primary results ====
Democratic primary results
Party	Candidate	Votes	%
Democratic	Peter A. Lennon	10,785	100.00
Total votes		10,785	100.00

=== Republican primary ===
==== Nominee ====
- Curt Weldon, incumbent U.S. Representative

==== Primary results ====
Republican primary results
Party	Candidate	Votes	%
Republican	Curt Weldon (incumbent)	44,672	100.00
Total votes		44,672	100.00

=== General election ===
General Election 2000: Pennsylvania's 7th congressional district
Party	Candidate	Votes	%
Republican	Curt Weldon (incumbent)	172,569	64.81
Democratic	Peter A. Lennon	93,687	35.19
Total votes		266,256	100.00

== District 8 ==
2000 Pennsylvania's 8th congressional district election
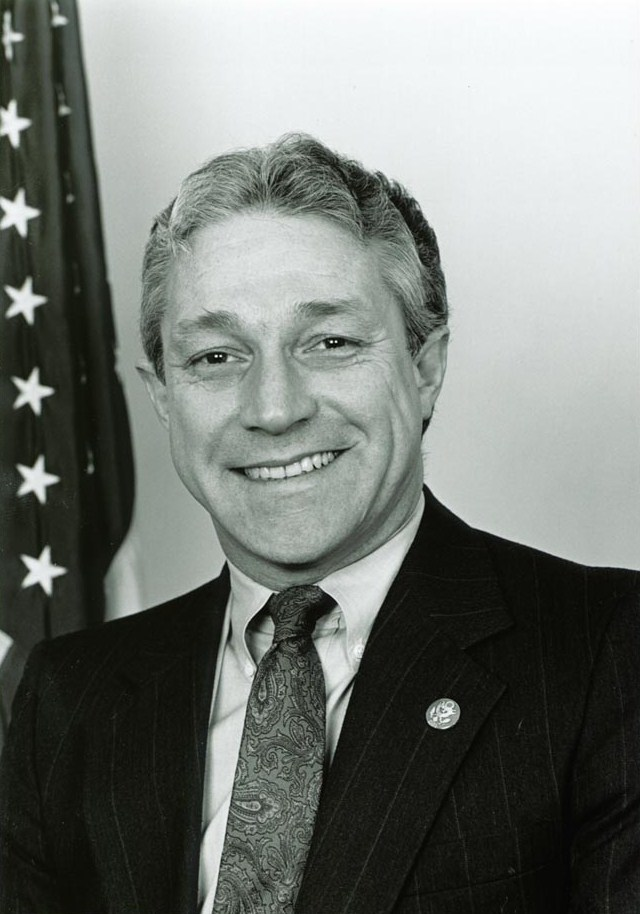

Nominee	Jim Greenwood	Ronald Strouse
Party	Republican	Democratic
Popular vote	154,090	100,617
Percentage	59.24%	38.68%
- County results Greenwood: 50–60% 60–70%
U.S. representative before election
Jim Greenwood
Republican
Elected U.S. representative
Jim Greenwood
Republican

=== Democratic primary ===
==== Nominee ====
- Ronald L. Strouse

==== Primary results ====
Democratic primary results
Party	Candidate	Votes	%
Democratic	Ronald L. Strouse	13,591	100.00
Total votes		13,591	100.00

=== Republican primary ===
==== Nominee ====
- Jim Greenwood, incumbent U.S. Representative

==== Eliminated in primary ====
- Tom Lingenfelter

==== Primary results ====
Republican primary results
Party	Candidate	Votes	%
Republican	Jim Greenwood (incumbent)	25,170	67.21
Republican	Tom Lingenfelter	12,278	32.79
Total votes		37,448	100.00

=== General election ===
General Election 2000: Pennsylvania's 8th congressional district
Party	Candidate	Votes	%
Republican	Jim Greenwood (incumbent)	154,090	59.24
Democratic	Ronald L. Strouse	100,617	38.68
Reform	Phillip C. Holmen	5,394	2.08
Total votes		260,101	100.00

== District 9 ==
2000 Pennsylvania's 9th congressional district election
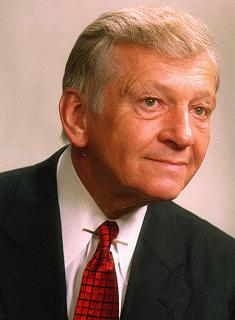
Nominee	Bud Shuster
Party	Republican
Popular vote	184,401
Percentage	100.00%
U.S. representative before election
Bud Shuster
Republican
Elected U.S. representative
Bud Shuster
Republican

=== Republican primary ===
==== Nominee ====
- Bud Shuster, incumbent U.S. Representative

==== Primary results ====
Republican primary results
Party	Candidate	Votes	%
Republican	Bud Shuster (incumbent)	37,252	100.00
Total votes		37,252	100.00

=== General election ===
General Election 2000: Pennsylvania's 9th congressional district
Party	Candidate	Votes	%
Republican	Bud Shuster (incumbent)	184,401	100.0
Total votes		184,401	100.0

== District 10 ==
2000 Pennsylvania's 10th congressional district election
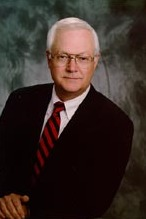

Nominee	Don Sherwood	Pat Casey
Party	Republican	Democratic
Popular vote	124,830	112,580
Percentage	52.58%	47.42%
- County results Sherwood: 50–60% 60–70% 70–80% Casey: 50–60% 60–70%
U.S. Representative before election
Don Sherwood
Republican
Elected U.S. Representative
Don Sherwood
Republican

=== Democratic primary ===
==== Nominee ====
- Pat Casey

==== Eliminated in primary ====
- Francis McHale

==== Primary results ====
Democratic primary results
Party	Candidate	Votes	%
Democratic	Pat Casey	24,210	82.33
Democratic	Francis McHale	5,196	17.67
Total votes		29,406	100.00

=== Republican primary ===
==== Nominee ====
- Don Sherwood, incumbent U.S. Representative

==== Primary results ====
Republican primary results
Party	Candidate	Votes	%
Republican	Don Sherwood (incumbent)	33,933	100.00
Total votes		33,933	100.00

=== General election ===
General Election 2000: Pennsylvania's 10th congressional district
Party	Candidate	Votes	%
Republican	Don Sherwood (incumbent)	124,830	52.58
Democratic	Pat Casey	112,580	47.42
Total votes		112,580	237,410

== District 11 ==
2000 Pennsylvania's 11th congressional district election
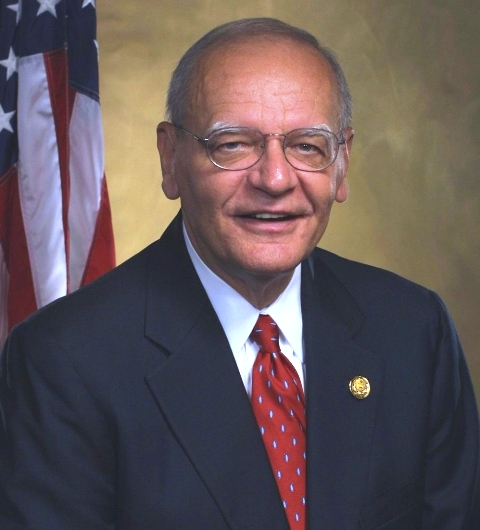

Nominee	Paul Kanjorski	Stephen Urban
Party	Democratic	Republican
Popular vote	131,948	66,699
Percentage	66.42%	33.58%
- County results Kanjorski: 50–60% 60–70%
U.S. representative before election
Paul Kanjorski
Democratic
Elected U.S. representative
Paul Kanjorski
Democratic

=== Democratic primary ===
==== Nominee ====
- Paul Kanjorski, incumbent U.S. Representative

==== Primary results ====
Democratic primary results
Party	Candidate	Votes	%
Democratic	Paul Kanjorski (incumbent)	27,985	100.00
Total votes		27,985	100.00

=== Republican primary ===
==== Nominee ====
- Stephen A. Urban

==== Primary results ====
Republican primary results
Party	Candidate	Votes	%
Republican	Stephen A. Urban	15,520	100.00
Total votes		15,520	100.00

=== General election ===
General Election 2000: Pennsylvania's 11th congressional district
Party	Candidate	Votes	%
Democratic	Paul Kanjorski (incumbent)	131,948	66.42
Republican	Stephen A. Urban	66,699	33.58
Total votes		198,647	100.00

== District 12 ==
2000 Pennsylvania's 12th congressional district election
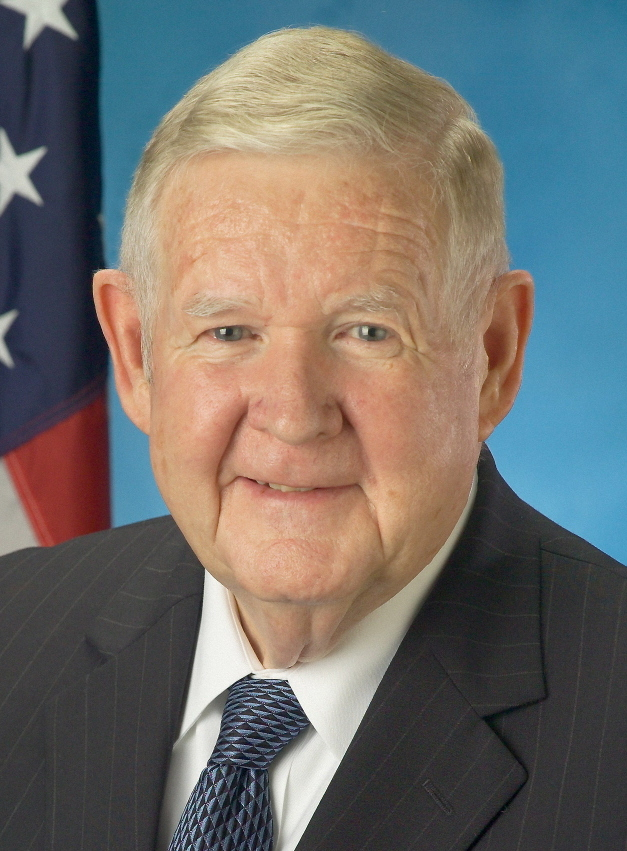

Nominee	John Murtha	Bill Choby
Party	Democratic	Republican
Popular vote	145,538	56,575
Percentage	70.84%	27.54%
- County results Murtha: 60–70% 70–80%
U.S. representative before election
John Murtha
Democratic
Elected U.S. representative
John Murtha
Democratic

=== Democratic primary ===
==== Nominee ====
- John Murtha, incumbent U.S. Representative

==== Primary results ====
Democratic primary results
Party	Candidate	Votes	%
Democratic	John Murtha (incumbent)	40,484	100.00
Total votes		40,484	100.00

=== Republican primary ===
==== Nominee ====
- Bill Choby

==== Primary results ====
Republican primary results
Party	Candidate	Votes	%
Republican	Bill Choby	23,630	100.00
Total votes		23,630	100.00

=== General election ===
General Election 2000: Pennsylvania's 12th congressional district
Party	Candidate	Votes	%
Democratic	John Murtha (incumbent)	145,538	70.84
Republican	Bill Choby	56,575	27.54
Reform	James N. O'Neil	3,324	1.62
Total votes		205,437	100.00

== District 13 ==
2000 Pennsylvania's 13th congressional district election
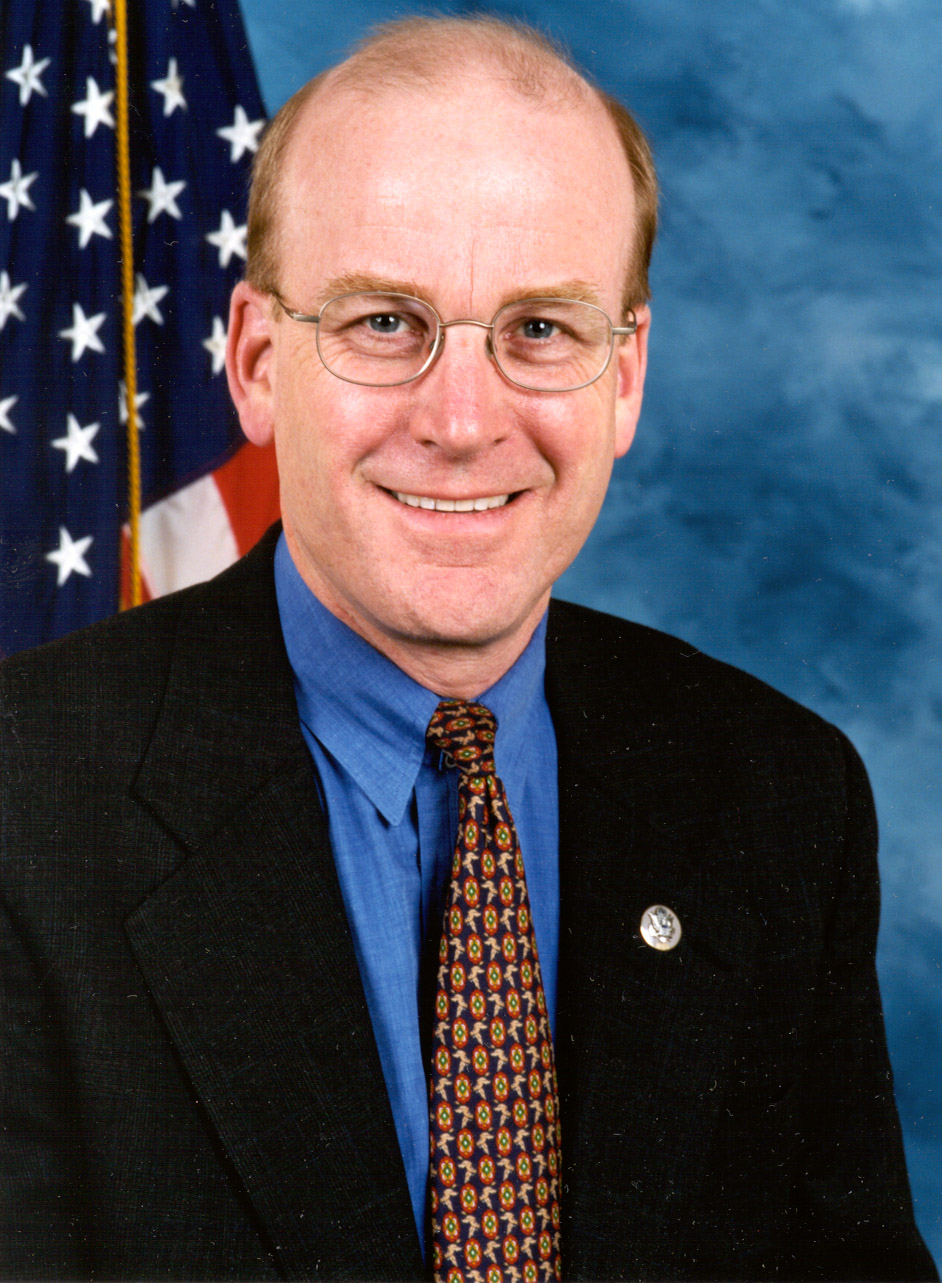

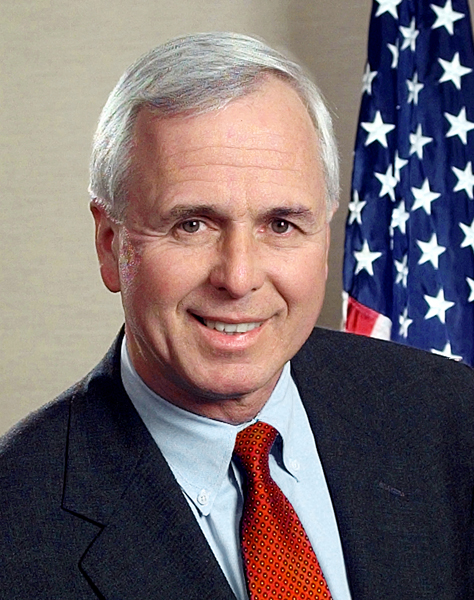
Nominee	Joe Hoeffel	Stewart Greenleaf
Party	Democratic	Republican
Popular vote	146,026	126,501
Percentage	52.76%	45.71%
- County results Hoeffel: 50–60%
U.S. representative before election
Joe Hoeffel
Democratic
Elected U.S. representative
Joe Hoeffel
Democratic

=== Democratic primary ===
==== Nominee ====
- Joe Hoeffel, incumbent U.S. Representative

==== Primary results ====
Democratic primary results
Party	Candidate	Votes	%
Democratic	Joe Hoeffel	20,749	100.00
Total votes		20,749	100.00

=== Republican primary ===
==== Nominee ====
- Stewart Greenleaf, member of the Pennsylvania State Senate

==== Eliminated in primary ====
- John Coffey

==== Primary results ====
Republican primary results
Party	Candidate	Votes	%
Republican	Stewart Greenleaf	24,623	57.20
Republican	John Coffey	18,427	42.80
Total votes		43,050	100.00

=== General election ===
General Election 2000: Pennsylvania's 13th congressional district
Party	Candidate	Votes	%
Democratic	Joe Hoeffel (incumbent)	146,026	52.76
Republican	Stewart Greenleaf	126,501	45.71
Libertarian	Ken Cavanaugh	4,224	1.53
Total votes		276,751	100.00

== District 14 ==
2000 Pennsylvania's 14th congressional district election
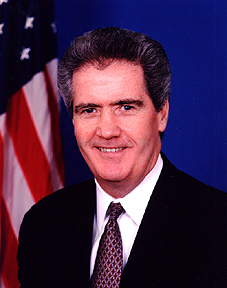
Nominee	William J. Coyne
Party	Democratic
Popular vote	147,533
Percentage	100.00%
U.S. representative before election
William J. Coyne
Democratic
Elected U.S. representative
William J. Coyne
Democratic

=== Democratic primary ===
==== Nominee ====
- William J. Coyne, incumbent U.S. Representative

==== Primary results ====
Democratic primary results
Party	Candidate	Votes	%
Democratic	William J. Coyne (incumbent)	44,187	100.00
Total votes		44,187	100.00

=== General election ===
General Election 2000: Pennsylvania's 14th congressional district
Party	Candidate	Votes	%
Democratic	William J. Coyne (incumbent)	147,533	100.00
Total votes		147,533	100.00

== District 15 ==
2000 Pennsylvania's 15th congressional district election
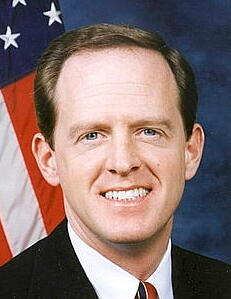

Nominee	Pat Toomey	Ed O'Brien
Party	Republican	Democratic
Popular vote	118,307	103,864
Percentage	53.25%	46.75%
- County results Toomey: 50–60% 60–70%
U.S. representative before election
Pat Toomey
Republican
Elected U.S. representative
Pat Toomey
Republican

Incumbent Republican Representative Pat Toomey was re-elected to a second term, defeating Democrat Ed O'Brien.

=== Democratic primary ===
==== Nominee ====
- Edward J. O'Brien

==== Primary results ====
Democratic primary results
Party	Candidate	Votes	%
Democratic	Edward J. O'Brien	18,093	100.00
Total votes		18,093	100.00

=== Republican primary ===
==== Nominee ====
- Pat Toomey, incumbent U.S. Representative

==== Primary results ====
Republican primary results
Party	Candidate	Votes	%
Republican	Pat Toomey (incumbent)	21,487	100.00
Total votes		21,487	100.00

=== General election ===
General Election 2000: Pennsylvania's 15th congressional district
Party	Candidate	Votes	%
Republican	Pat Toomey (incumbent)	118,307	53.25
Democratic	Ed O'Brien	103,864	46.75
Total votes		222,171	100.00

== District 16 ==
2000 Pennsylvania's 16th congressional district election
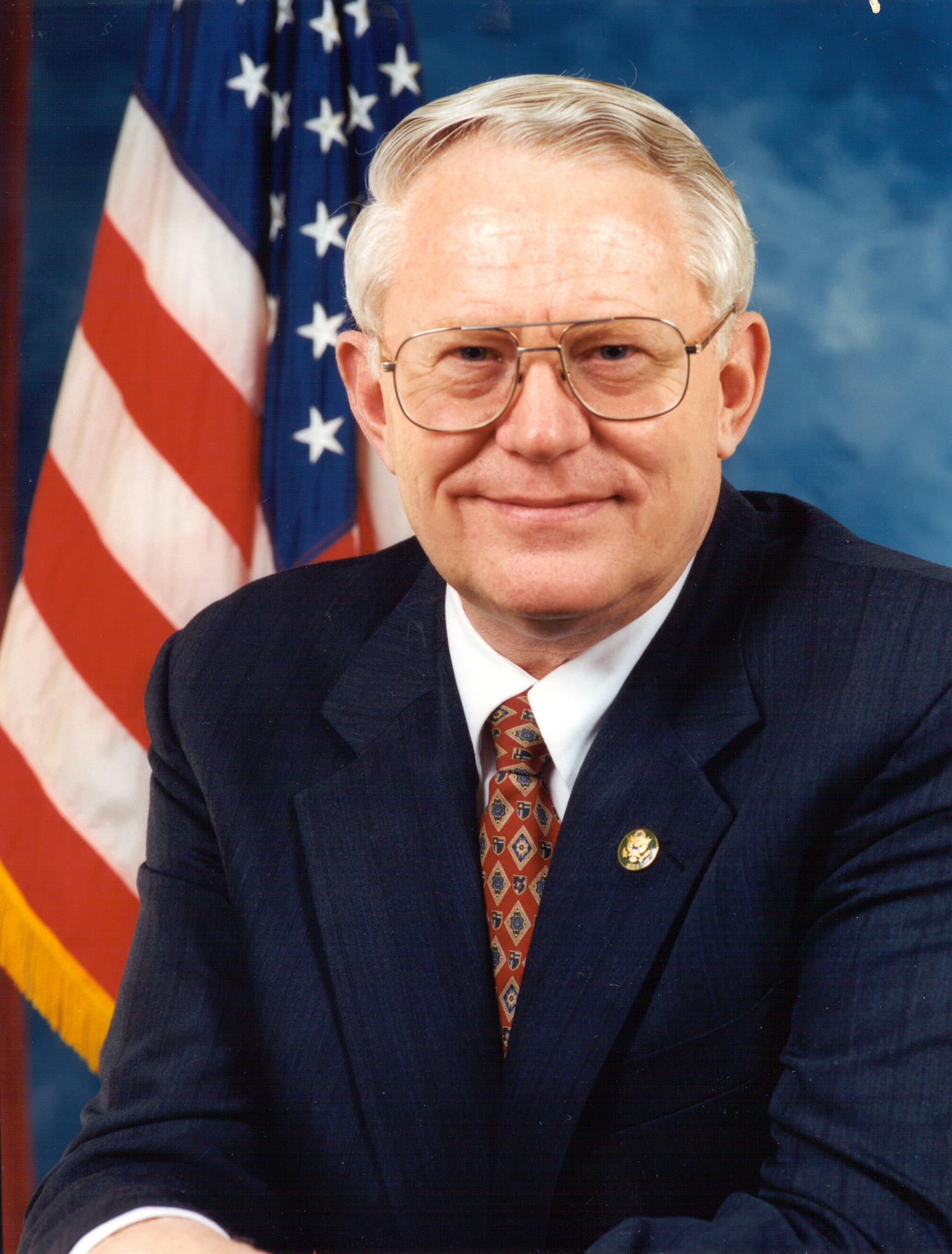

Nominee	Joe Pitts	Bob Yorczyk
Party	Republican	Democratic
Popular vote	162,403	80,177
Percentage	66.95%	33.05%
- County results Pitts: 60–70% 70–80%
U.S. representative before election
Joe Pitts
Republican
Elected U.S. representative
Joe Pitts
Republican

=== Democratic primary ===
==== Nominee ====
- Bob Yorczyk

==== Primary results ====
Democratic primary results
Party	Candidate	Votes	%
Democratic	Bob Yorczyk	9,517	100.00
Total votes		9,517	100.00

=== Republican primary ===
==== Nominee ====
- Joe Pitts, incumbent U.S. Representative

==== Primary results ====
Republican primary results
Party	Candidate	Votes	%
Republican	Joe Pitts (incumbent)	34,781	100.00
Total votes		34,781	100.00

=== General election ===
General Election 2000: Pennsylvania's 16th congressional district
Party	Candidate	Votes	%
Republican	Joe Pitts (incumbent)	162,403	66.95
Democratic	Bob Yorczyk	80,177	33.05
Total votes		242,580	100.00

== District 17 ==
2000 Pennsylvania's 17th congressional district election
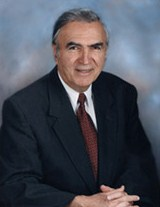

Nominee	George Gekas	Leslye Hess Herrmann
Party	Republican	Democratic
Popular vote	166,236	66,190
Percentage	71.52%	28.48%
- County results Gekas: 60–70% 70–80%
U.S. representative before election
George Gekas
Republican
Elected U.S. representative
George Gekas
Republican

=== Democratic primary ===
==== Nominee ====
- Leslye Hess Herrmann

==== Primary results ====
Democratic primary results
Party	Candidate	Votes	%
Democratic	Leslye Hess Herrmann	14,356	100.00
Total votes		14,356	100.00

=== Republican primary ===
==== Nominee ====
- George Gekas, incumbent U.S. Representative

==== Primary results ====
Republican primary results
Party	Candidate	Votes	%
Republican	George Gekas	45,221	100.00
Total votes		45,221	100.00

=== General election ===
General Election 2000: Pennsylvania's 17th congressional district
Party	Candidate	Votes	%
Republican	George Gekas (incumbent)	166,236	71.52
Democratic	Leslye Hess Herrmann	66,190	28.48
Total votes		232,426	100.00

== District 18 ==
2000 Pennsylvania's 18th congressional district election
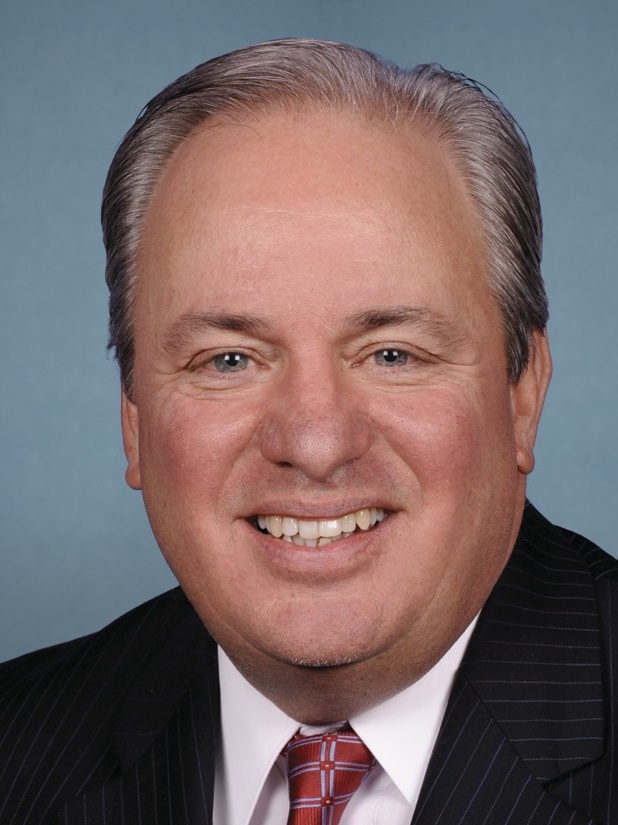

Nominee	Mike Doyle	Craig Stephens
Party	Democratic	Republican
Popular vote	156,131	68,798
Percentage	69.41%	30.59%
- County results Doyle: 60–70%
U.S. representative before election
Mike Doyle
Democratic
Elected U.S. representative
Mike Doyle
Democratic

=== Democratic primary ===
==== Nominee ====
- Mike Doyle, incumbent U.S. Representative

==== Primary results ====
Democratic primary results
Party	Candidate	Votes	%
Democratic	Mike Doyle (incumbent)	47,827	100.00
Total votes		47,827	100.00

=== Republican primary ===
==== Nominee ====
- Craig C. Stephens

==== Primary results ====
Republican primary results
Party	Candidate	Votes	%
Republican	Craig C. Stephens	15,311	100.00
Total votes		15,311	100.00

=== General election ===
General Election 2000: Pennsylvania's 18th congressional district
Party	Candidate	Votes	%
Democratic	Mike Doyle (incumbent)	156,131	69.41
Republican	Craig C. Stephens	68,798	30.59
Total votes		224,929	100.00

== District 19 ==
2000 Pennsylvania's 19th congressional district election
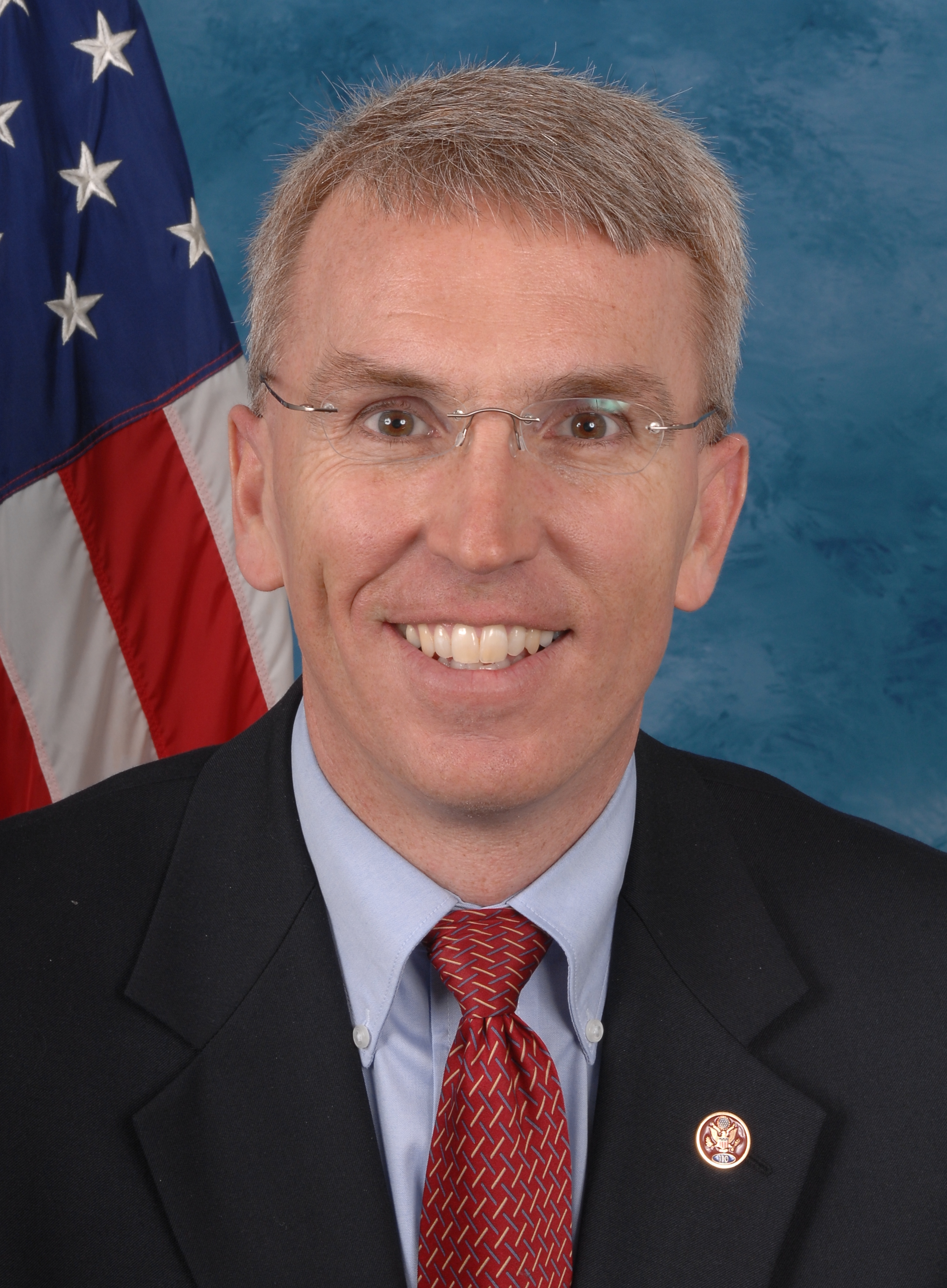

Nominee	Todd Platts	Jeff Sanders
Party	Republican	Democratic
Popular vote	168,722	61,538
Percentage	72.57%	26.47%
- County results Platts: 60–70% 70–80%
U.S. representative before election
Bill Goodling
Republican
Elected U.S. representative
Todd Platts
Republican

=== Democratic primary ===
==== Nominee ====
- Jeff Sanders

==== Eliminated in primary ====
- John J. Moran

==== Primary results ====
Democratic primary results
Party	Candidate	Votes	%
Democratic	Jeff Sanders	11,670	53.71
Democratic	John J. Moran	10,057	46.29
Total votes		21,727	100.00

=== Republican primary ===
==== Nominee ====
- Todd Platts, member of the Pennsylvania House of Representatives

==== Eliminated in primary ====
- Charlie Gerow, Republican Party political strategist
- Albert Masland, member of the Pennsylvania House of Representatives
- Christopher B. Reilly
- Dick Stewart

==== Primary results ====
Republican primary results
Party	Candidate	Votes	%
Republican	Todd Platts	21,448	33.33
Republican	Albert Masland	18,674	29.02
Republican	Dick Stewart	11,973	18.60
Republican	Charlie Gerow	8,314	12.92
Republican	Christopher B. Reilly	3,948	6.13
Total votes		64,357	100.00

=== General election ===
General Election 2000: Pennsylvania's 19th congressional district
Party	Candidate	Votes	%
Republican	Todd Platts	168,722	72.57
Democratic	Jeff Sanders	61,538	26.47
Constitution	Michael L. Paoletta	2,234	0.96
Total votes		232,494	100.00

== District 20 ==
2000 Pennsylvania's 20th congressional district election
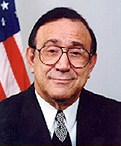

Nominee	Frank Mascara	Ronald Davis
Party	Democratic	Republican
Popular vote	145,131	80,312
Percentage	64.38%	35.62%
- County results Mascara: 50–60% 60–70% 70–80%
U.S. representative before election
Frank Mascara
Democratic
Elected U.S. representative
Frank Mascara
Democratic

=== Democratic primary ===
==== Nominee ====
- Frank Mascara, incumbent U.S. Representative

==== Primary results ====
Democratic primary results
Party	Candidate	Votes	%
Democratic	Frank Mascara (incumbent)	47,462	100.00
Total votes		47,462	100.00

=== Republican primary ===
==== Nominee ====
- Ronald J. Davis

==== Primary results ====
Republican primary results
Party	Candidate	Votes	%
Republican	Ronald J. Davis	16,038	100.00
Total votes		16,038	100.00

=== General election ===
General Election 2000: Pennsylvania's 20th congressional district
Party	Candidate	Votes	%
Democratic	Frank Mascara (Incumbent)	145,131	64.38
Republican	Ronald J. Davis	80,312	35.62
Total votes		225,443	100.00

== District 21 ==
2000 Pennsylvania's 21st congressional district election
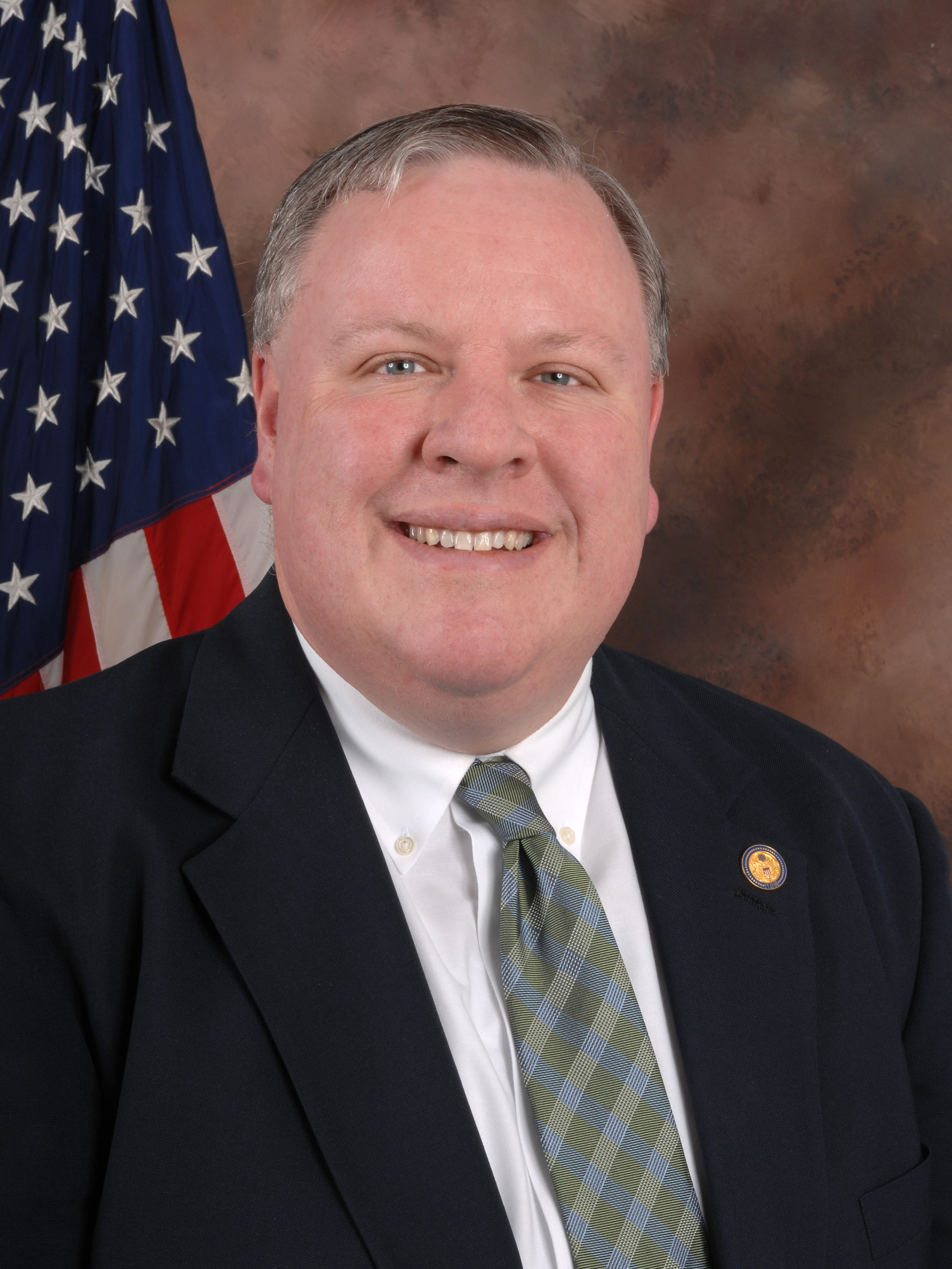

Nominee	Phil English	Marc Flitter
Party	Republican	Democratic
Popular vote	135,164	87,018
Percentage	60.83%	39.17%
- County results English: 50–60% 60–70%
U.S. representative before election
Phil English
Republican
Elected U.S. representative
Phil English
Republican

=== Democratic primary ===
==== Nominee ====
- Marc A. Flitter

==== Primary results ====
Democratic primary results
Party	Candidate	Votes	%
Democratic	Marc A. Flitter	24,465	100.00
Total votes		24,465	100.00

=== Republican primary ===
==== Nominee ====
- Phil English, incumbent U.S. Representative

==== Primary results ====
Republican primary results
Party	Candidate	Votes	%
Republican	Phil English (incumbent)	31,058	100.00
Total votes		31,058	100.00

=== General election ===
General Election 2000: Pennsylvania's 21st congressional district
Party	Candidate	Votes	%
Republican	Phil English (incumbent)	135,164	60.83
Democratic	Marc A. Flitter	87,018	39.17
Total votes		222,182	100.00

== See also ==
- Pennsylvania's congressional delegations
- 107th United States Congress
