= Kathrin Anklam-Trapp =

German politician (born 1968)

- Kathrin Anklam-Trapp

State Secretary in the Rhineland-Palatinate Ministry of Labour, Social Affairs, Women, Family, and Youth
- Incumbent
- Assumed office 18 May 2026
- Preceded by: Denis Alt
- Constituency: Rhein-Selz/Wonnegau

Personal details
- Born: 21 March 1968 (age 58) Worms
- Citizenship: Germany
- Party: Social Democratic Party (since 1993)
- Domestic partner: Michael Kissel
- Children: 2

Kathrin Anklam-Trapp (born 21 March 1968 in Worms) is a German politician. She was a member of the Landtag of Rhineland-Palatinate from 2006 to 2026 and served as its Vice-President between 2023 and 2026. Since May 2026, she has been State Secretary in the Rhineland-Palatinate Ministry of Labour, Social Affairs, Women, Family and Youth.

== Education, career, and family ==
Kathrin Anklam-Trapp trained as a nurse from 1985 to 1987 and worked as a nurse until 1990. From 1990 to 1992, she undertook specialist training in surgical nursing and worked as a surgical nurse until she was elected to the state parliament in 2006.

She lives with her family in Monsheim and has two children.

== Politics ==
Kathrin Anklam-Trapp joined the SPD in 1993 and served as chair of the Monsheim SPD branch from 1999 to 2005. From 2004 to 2020, she was chair of the Alzey-Worms SPD sub-district. She was a member of the local council from 1996 to 2015 and has been a member again since 2019, and has been a member of the Monsheim municipal council since 1999. In 1999, she was elected to the Alzey-Worms district council and has been chair of the SPD district council group since 2019.

Since 2012, she has been a member of the executive committee of the Social Democrats in Healthcare Working Group and a member of the Rhineland-Palatinate SPD’s regional executive committee.

On 18 May 2006, she was elected for the first time as a direct representative for Constituency 32 (formerly Nierstein/Oppenheim, now Rhein-Selz/Wonnegau) to the Rhineland-Palatinate State Parliament, a feat she repeated in the state elections of 2011, 2016, and, most recently, 2021.

During the 16th parliamentary term, she was chair of the working group and deputy chair of the Committee on Social Affairs, Labour, Health and Demography, as well as a member of the Committee on Agriculture, Food, Viticulture, the Environment and Forestry and a member of the Committee on Media and Internet Policy. During the 17th parliamentary term, she was a member of the Committee on Health, Care and Demography and the Committee on Social Affairs and Labour.

From 2011 to 2021, she was the health policy spokesperson for the SPD parliamentary group.

During the 18th legislative term, she was chair of the working group on Labour, Social Affairs, Care and Transformation, as well as deputy chair of the SPD parliamentary group in the state parliament. She is also a member of the Council of Elders, the Committee on Labour, Social Affairs, Care and Transformation, and the Committee on Health. Within the SPD parliamentary group, she is spokesperson for care policy and for people with disabilities.

On 13 December 2023, she was elected Vice-President of the Rhineland-Palatinate State Parliament.

On 18 May 2026, she was appointed State Secretary at the Rhineland-Palatinate Ministry of Labour, Social Affairs, Women, Family and Youth. As a result, she resigned her seat in the State Parliament; Joshua Schmitt took her place.
