= Greg Scott (politician) =

American politician

Member of the Pennsylvania House of Representatives from the 54th district
- Incumbent
- Assumed office January 3, 2023
- Preceded by: Bob Brooks

Magisterial District Judge, 38-2-09
- In office January 4, 2016 – February 8, 2022

Personal details
- Party: Democratic
- Education: Chestnut Hill College (BS); Philadelphia College of Osteopathic Medicine (MS)
- Website: Official website Campaign website

Gregory Scott is a Democratic member of the Pennsylvania House of Representatives, representing the 54th District since 2023.

== Biography ==
A native of Norristown, Scott served as a non-voting junior borough councilman and a volunteer firefighter and EMT as a teenager.

He earned a bachelor's degree in business communications from Chestnut Hill College, and a master's degree in organizational leadership from the Philadelphia College of Osteopathic Medicine in 2013.

Scott worked as a congressional aide to U.S. Representatives Joe Sestak and Chaka Fattah, and as chief of staff to the CEO of Universal Companies, a nonprofit founded by Kenny Gamble.

Scott was elected a magisterial district judge in November 2015, becoming the first African American district judge in Montgomery County and (at 28) the youngest sitting judge in Pennsylvania. He resigned in February 2022 to run for the Pennsylvania House of Representatives in the 54th District, which was redistricted from Western Pennsylvania to Montgomery County. He was elected on November 8, 2022, defeating Republican Allen Arthur Anderson by 72% to 28%.

Political offices
Pennsylvania House of Representatives
Preceded by Robert Brooks	Member of the Pennsylvania House of Representatives from the 54th district 2023–present	Incumbent
