= Robert Brooks (Pennsylvania politician) =

American politician

Robert "Bob" Brooks

Member of the Pennsylvania House of Representatives from the 54th district
- In office December 1, 2018 – January 3, 2023
- Preceded by: Eli Evankovich
- Succeeded by: Greg Scott

Mayor, Murrysville, Pennsylvania
- In office 2010–2018

City Councillor, Murrysville, Pennsylvania

Personal details
- Born: 1943 or 1944 (age 82–83)
- Spouse: Sue
- Children: 3
- Education: Franklin & Marshall College; Wharton School of the University of Pennsylvania
- Occupation: Financial Advisor
- Website: www.repbrooks.com

Robert Brooks (born 1943 or 1944) is an American politician. He is a former Republican member of the Pennsylvania House of Representatives, representing the 54th district from 2018 to 2023. Previously, he served as a city councillor and mayor in Murrysville, Pennsylvania.

== Political career ==
Brooks was a member of the City Council in Murrysville, Pennsylvania, and was Mayor of Murrysville from 2010 to 2018. In 2015, he was named Pennsylvania's Mayor of the Year by the Pennsylvania State Mayors Association.

In 2018, he ran for election to represent the 54th district in the Pennsylvania House of Representatives. The Republican primary was a four-way race, which Brooks won with 35% of the vote. He went on to win the general election with 59.8% of the vote.

He previously sat on the following House committees:

- Commerce
- Finance
- Local Government
- Urban Affairs (Subcommittee Chair on Cities, Third Class)

== Electoral record ==
2018 Republican primary election: Pennsylvania House of Representatives, District 54
Party	Candidate	Votes	%
Republican	Robert Brooks	1,755	35.0%
Republican	Michael Korns Jr.	1,333	26.6%
Republican	Maryalice Newborn	1,319	26.3%
Republican	Bryan Kline	612	12.2%

2018 general election: Pennsylvania House of Representatives, District 54
Party	Candidate	Votes	%
Republican	Robert Brooks	16,301	59.8%
Democratic	Jonathan McCabe	10,944	40.2%
