= Elisabeth Schmitt =

German-American lawyer (1891–1974)

Elisabeth Schmitt (October 28, 1891 in Frankfurt – 1974 in Chicago) was a German-American lawyer and one of the first women in Germany to become a PhD in law. Elisabeth Schmitt was in her mid-forties when she arrived in the United States where she did not open her own academic career though receiving an offer from a Quaker College in Iowa, she refused and became a secretary at the German Department of the University of Chicago. In addition, she was able to hold courses on philological methods and start a career as a translator.
