= Eli Evankovich =

American politician

Member of the Pennsylvania House of Representatives from the 54th district
- In office January 4, 2011 – January 1, 2019
- Preceded by: John Pallone
- Succeeded by: Robert Brooks

Personal details
- Born: 1982 (age 43–44) Murrysville, Pennsylvania, U.S.
- Party: Republican
- Education: University of Pittsburgh
- Occupation: Financial Analyst, Legislator

Eli Evankovich (born August 9, 1982) is a Republican former member of the Pennsylvania House of Representatives. He represented Pennsylvania's 54th district, which includes parts of Westmoreland and Armstrong counties.

Evankovich was born and raised in Murrysville, Pennsylvania, and is a graduate of Franklin Regional High School and the University of Pittsburgh.

In 2010, Evankovich challenged and defeated 10-year incumbent John Pallone, winning 60% of the vote, while claiming that his victory was "...an indictment of the system, not of the person..."

Following a motorcycle accident in 2016, Evankovich announced he would not run for re-election in 2018. In June 2018 he announced his intentions to resign from the legislature. He was CEO of Premier Automation of Monroeville, PA from August 2018 to September 2020.
