= Schmidt's =

Schmidt's may refer to:

- Schmidt's Girls College, an international German school in East Jerusalem
- Schmidt's Naturals, an American personal care company
- Schmidt Baking Company, an American bakery
- Christian Schmidt Brewing Company, a defunct American brewery, based in Philadelphia
- Jacob Schmidt Brewing Company, a defunct American brewery, based in Saint Paul, Minnesota

== See also ==
- Schmidt (disambiguation)
