= Sarah Galvão =

Brazilian-American jiu-jitsu practitioner (b. 2006)

Sarah Cabral Firme Galvão
- Born: 5 July 2006 (age 20); Ubatuba, São Paulo, Brazil
- Nationality: Brazil / USA
- Division: Lightweight (up to 62 kilograms (137 lb))
- Team: Atos Jiu‑Jitsu
- Rank: Black belt in Brazilian Jiu-Jitsu (promoted June 2025)

Other information
Medal record
Representing BRA
Brazilian Jiu‑Jitsu
IBJJF The Crown
Gold medal – first place	2026 Long Beach, USA	Lightweight
Gold medal – first place	2025 Long Beach, USA	Lightweight
Pan Jiu-Jitsu Championship
Gold medal – first place	2026 California, USA	Lightweight
Gold medal – first place	2026 California, USA	Absolute
European IBJJF Jiu-Jitsu Championship
Gold medal – first place	2026 Lisbon, Portugal	Lightweight
Brazilian Nationals
Gold medal – first place	2026 São Paulo, Brazil	Lightweight
IBJJF Asian Championship
Gold medal – first place	2025 Chiba, Japan	Lightweight
Gold medal – first place	2025 Chiba, Japan	Absolute
IBJJF American Nationals
Gold medal – first place	2025 California, USA	Lightweight

Sarah Cabral Firme Galvão (born July 2006) is a Brazilian-American professional grappler and Brazilian jiu‑jitsu practitioner. She is a black belt under her parents, martial arts champions André Galvão and Angelica Galvão. She represents the Atos Jiu‑Jitsu team.

== Early life and training ==
Born in Ubatuba, São Paulo, Brazil, Sarah moved to San Diego, California with her family at a young age and began training at Atos Jiu‑Jitsu HQ under the guidance of her parents. She was the first student in the Atos kids' program and participated in multiple sports before focusing exclusively on Brazilian jiu‑jitsu.

== Competitive career ==
Sarah earned international recognition as a juvenile blue belt by completing the IBJJF Grand Slam in 2022 — winning gold in her weight and open categories at the European Championship, Pan Continental, World Championship, and Brazilian Nationals. She also went undefeated in the colored belt divisions and ranked number one across every belt from 2022 to 2025.

In 2023, as a purple belt, she won the Abu Dhabi World Pro Youth Championship and then the open division just days later. Stepping into brown belt competition later that year, she won both her weight and absolute divisions at the Abu Dhabi Grand Slam Rio and the World Professional Championship.

At the 2025 IBJJF World Championship, Sarah captured gold in the brown belt lightweight division. Despite being upset in the absolute division by Aghata Fernandes via kneebar, she was awarded her black belt on the podium by her parents immediately afterward.

She began her black belt career with dominant performances, including all wins by submission at the 2025 IBJJF American Nationals.

In August 2025, Galvão was one of four athletes invited to the women's open-weight tournament at Craig Jones Invitational 2 in Las Vegas. She reached the final, where she was submitted by Helena Crevar.

In November 2025, in her rookie black belt season, she won the lightweight division at the IBJJF's invitational event The Crown, held at the Walter Pyramid in Long Beach, California. She submitted 2024 Crown champion Brianna Ste-Marie in her opening match, beat Cássia Moura in the semifinal and defeated reigning world champion Janaína Lebre on advantages in the final, without conceding a point in the tournament.

In 2026 she won the lightweight division at the European Championship, taking silver in the absolute after losing the final to Gabi Pessanha on advantages. At the Pan Championship she won double gold, beating Janaína Lebre in the lightweight final and Pessanha in the absolute final. She then won the lightweight title at the Brazilian Nationals and took silver in the absolute, again losing to Pessanha. At the 2026 World Championship she lost the lightweight final to Lebre and was eliminated by Tayane Porfírio in the semifinals of the absolute, finishing with silver and bronze. On 8 November 2026 she defended her Crown title, winning the lightweight division again with a points win over Elizabeth Clay in the final.

== Titles and accomplishments ==
- IBJJF The Crown champion (2025, 2026 – black belt lightweight)
- IBJJF Pan Champion (2026 – black belt lightweight and absolute)
- IBJJF European Champion (2026 – black belt lightweight)
- IBJJF Brazilian National Champion (2026 – black belt lightweight)
- IBJJF World Champion (2025 – Brown belt lightweight)
- IBJJF American Nationals Champion (2025 – black belt lightweight via submission)
- IBJJF Asian Championship Champion (2025 – black belt lightweight and absolute)
- IBJJF Grand Slam winner (2022–2025 – across colored belts)
- Abu Dhabi World Professional Championship (2023 – brown belt) and Youth World Pro Champion (2023 – purple belt)
- Abu Dhabi Grand Slam World Tour (2023 – brown belt lightweight champion)

== Personal life ==
Daughter of black belts André and Angelica Galvão, Sarah comes from a family lineage of BJJ champions.

== See also ==
- Gabi Garcia
- Emily Kwok
- Ana Carolina Schmitt
