= John Pallone =

American politician

Member of the Pennsylvania House of Representatives from the 54th district
- In office December 1, 2000 – November 30, 2010
- Preceded by: Terry Van Horne
- Succeeded by: Eli Evankovich

Personal details
- Born: July 30, 1960 (age 65) New Kensington, Pennsylvania
- Party: Democratic
- Spouse: Judi Pallone

John E. Pallone (born July 30, 1960) is a Democratic Party politician and former member of the Pennsylvania House of Representatives. He represented the 54th District from December 2000 through November 2010.

== Biography ==
A lifelong resident of the Alle-Kiski Valley, Pallone graduated from Valley High School in 1978. He went on to earn a bachelor's degree from Grove City College, and a Juris Doctor from the Cleveland-Marshall College of Law.

He married his wife, Judi, in 2002.

Pallone worked as a trial lawyer and also as the Commissioner's Coordinator for Westmoreland County. Elected to the Pennsylvania House of Representatives in 2000, he was defeated in his bid for a sixth term in 2010.
