= Pennsylvania House of Representatives, District 54 =

American legislative district

Pennsylvania's 54th State House of Representatives district
Representative
Greg Scott; D–Norristown
- Population (2022): 63,471

The 54th Pennsylvania House of Representatives District in southeast Pennsylvania has been represented by Greg Scott since 2023.

== District profile ==
The 54th District was previously located in Allegheny County and Westmoreland County. Following 2022 redistricting, the District is located in Montgomery County and includes the following areas:

- Conshohocken
- Norristown
- Plymouth Township

== Representatives ==
Representative	Party	Years	District home	Note
Prior to 1969, seats were apportioned by county.
C. L. Schmitt	Democrat	1969 – 1980		
Terry E. VanHorne	Democrat	1981 – 2000		Unsuccessfully ran for the U.S. House of Representatives
John Pallone	Democrat	2001 – 2010	New Kensington	
Eli Evankovich	Republican	2011 – 2019		
Robert Brooks	Republican	2019 – 2023	Murrysville	
District moved from Allegheny and Westmoreland Counties to Montgomery County in 2022 redistricting
Greg Scott	Democrat	2023 – present	Norristown	Incumbent

== Recent election results ==
PA House election, 2024: Pennsylvania House, District 54
Party	Candidate	Votes	%
Democratic	Greg Scott (incumbent)	18,584	69.67
Republican	Martin Dickerson	8,092	30.33
Total votes		26,676	100.00
Democratic hold			

PA House election, 2022: Pennsylvania House, District 54
Party	Candidate	Votes	%
Democratic	Greg Scott	14,379	71.67
Republican	Allen Anderson	5,685	28.33
Total votes		20,064	100.00
Democratic gain from Republican			

PA House election, 2020: Pennsylvania House, District 54
Party	Candidate	Votes	%
Republican	Bob Brooks (incumbent)	Unopposed	
Total votes		30,446	100.00
Republican hold			

PA House election, 2018: Pennsylvania House, District 54
Party	Candidate	Votes	%
Republican	Bob Brooks	16,301	59.83
Democratic	Jon McCabe	10,944	40.17
Total votes		27,245	100.00
Republican hold			

PA House election, 2016: Pennsylvania House, District 54
Party	Candidate	Votes	%
Republican	Eli Evankovich (incumbent)	Unopposed	
Total votes		27,008	100.00
Republican hold			
