= Michelle Schmitt =

American singer-songwriter

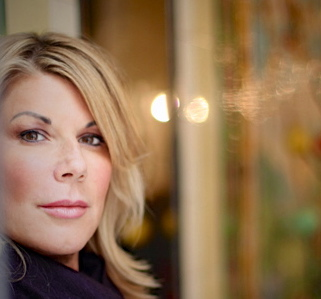
- Schmitt in 2012

Background information
- Born: Detroit, Michigan, U.S.
- Genres: Americana; rock; folk rock; pop
- Occupations: Singer-songwriter; producer; recording studio owner
- Instruments: Vocals; guitar; piano
- Labels: Harrison Street; Pine Mountain Studio; Lilysong
- Website: www.michelleschmitt.com

Michelle Schmitt (born in Detroit, Michigan) is an American singer-songwriter and music producer living and working in San Francisco, California.

== Career ==
Schmitt began playing guitar and writing songs when she was 12 years old. She moved to San Francisco in 1977. Growing up in Detroit, Schmitt was exposed to artists such as Joni Mitchell, Etta James, Aretha Franklin, Tina Turner, Carole King, Eva Cassidy, Bonnie Raitt, Buffe St. Marie and Emmylou Harris as sources of inspiration. In 2005, Schmitt was invited to contribute a song on a record, Fearless Hearts, featuring six Grammy winners and two Rock & Roll Hall of Famers (including Bonnie Raitt, Kenny Loggins, Bill Medley, Rosanne Cash, Johnny Cash, Rodney Crowell, Beth Nielsen Chapman and Mike and the Mechanics). Schmitt worked at Sound Management in San Jose, California in the early 2000s before opening Lilysong Records in Marin County.

In 2006, Schmitt opened the doors to her San Francisco studio, Harrison Street Records, and opened Pine Mountain Studio in Alexander Valley in 2008.

In 2015, Schmitt purchased a new Sausalito location to spend more time songwriting. Schmitt has engaged in philanthropy and performs at numerous benefit concerts, helping organizations that assist homeless adults and youth in San Francisco and Marin County, Little Wishes in San Francisco, the LGBT communities both in San Francisco and Marin County, Meals on Wheels SF, ExtraFood.org, SF/Marin Food Bank, Shanti Project in San Francisco, anti-bullying organizations and various youth drug prevention programs. 100% of all proceeds of Schmitt's music goes to charity.

Schmitt produces and arranges her own records and has worked and co-produced music with her friend, Ricky Fataar. Schmitt has spent time writing with her friend and songwriting chair at Berklee School of Music, Bonnie Hayes.

== Discography ==
- Fearless Hearts (with Bonnie Raitt, Kenny Loggins, Bill Medley, Rosanne Cash, Johnny Cash, Rodney Crowell, Beth Nielsen Chapman, and Mike and the Mechanics) (2004)
- Faith, Love and Detroit (2004)
- Promises (2005)
- Home (2007)
- Another Winter (2008)
- Christmas on Pine Mountain (2009)
- Being Here (2010)
- Covering Life (2011)
- Late Tonight (2012)
- Messages (2013)
- To Remember You (2014)
- Another Christmas Story (2015)
- Detroit Girl (2016)
- San Francisco AM Sessions (2016)
- San Francisco PM Sessions (2016)
- Christmas Gifts (2016)
- Joy (2017)
- Christmas Stories (2018)
- St Mary's (2018)
- Detroit Girl Too (2019)
- Going Home (2019)
- Light (2020)
- Opened Letters (2022)

== Personal life ==
Schmitt lives in Marin County, California, and has been married to Henry Schmitt since 1984. She has two sons, Eric (born 1987) and Alexander (born 1988). She also has a daughter-in-law, Kim Schmitt, who is married to Eric, and three granddaughters.
