= Schmidt =

Schmidt may refer to:

== People and persons ==
- Schmidt (surname), including list of people and fictional characters with the surname
- Schmidt (singer) (born 1990), German pop and jazz singer
- Schmidt Spiele, a German games manufacturer
- von Schmidt auf Altenstadt, a German baronial family in Kirchgattendorf, part of the municipality of Gattendorf

== Places ==
- Cape Schmidt, a cape on the coast of the Chukchi Sea, Russia, also known by its Russian name, Mys Shmidta
- Schmidt Block, listed on the National Register of Historic Places in Scott County, Iowa, USA
- Schmidt Brewery, a St. Paul brewery
- Schmidt Island, an island in the Novaya Zemlya archipelago in the Arctic Ocean
- Schmidt (lunar crater), a small lunar impact crater
- Schmidt (Martian crater), a crater on Mars
- Schmidt Peninsula (Sakhalin), a peninsula at the northern tip of Sakhalin, Russia
- Schmidt Peninsula (Antarctica)
- Schmidt Site, an archeological site in Michigan, USA, listed on the National Register of Historic Places in 1973
- Schmidt Theater, theatre in Hamburg, Germany
- Schmidt (volcano), in Kamchatka

== Other ==
- Schmidt Baking Company, makers of Schmidt's Blue Ribbon Bread
- Schmidt camera, an astronomical telescope designed for photography
- Schmidt–Cassegrain telescope, a version of the Schmidt camera
- Schmidt decomposition, a decomposition of vectors of tensor product spaces
- Schmidt hammer, a device to measure the elastic properties or strength of concrete or rock.
- Schmidt (New Girl), a character on the television sitcom New Girl
- Schmidt number
- Schmidt reaction
- Schmidt sting pain index, a scalar index to the degree of pain from hymenoptera stings

== See also ==
- Schmidt's (disambiguation)
- Smith (surname)
- Schmitt (disambiguation)
- Schmit, a surname
- Schmitz
- Schmid
- Schmied
- Smits
