= Schmitt Music =

American musical instrument retailer

Schmitt Music Company
- Type: Private
- Industry: Musical instruments
- Founded: 1896
- Headquarters: Bloomington, Minnesota, United States
- Key people: Paul A. Schmitt, Founder and President 1896-1935 Robert A. Schmitt, President 1935-1958 Robert P. Schmitt, President 1958-1985 Thomas A. Schmitt, President 1985-2021 Peter Schmitt, President 2021-
- Products: Musical instruments and accessories
- Number of employees: 400
- Website: www.schmittmusic.com

Schmitt Music is an American retail company which specializes in acoustic pianos, digital pianos, band and orchestra instruments, and other musical instruments, sheet music and accessories, as well as offering services such as: piano moving & storage, instrument repair and music instruction. The company operates 9 stores in five states. Founded in 1896 as the Paul A. Schmitt Music Company, it was awarded the Steinway & Sons Partners in Performance Award in 2003, and the Steinway & Sons "Dealer of the Year" in 2011. Schmitt Music was named Kawai Dealer of the Year in 2012.

== Locations ==
Schmitt Music currently operates 9 stores in states throughout the Midwest.

- Bloomington, Minnesota (headquarters)
- Anoka, Minnesota
- Duluth, Minnesota
- Eau Claire, Wisconsin
- Fargo, North Dakota
- Omaha, Nebraska
- Rochester, Minnesota
- Sioux Falls, South Dakota
- Virginia, Minnesota

== History ==
Schmitt Music was founded by Paul A. Schmitt in 1896 in Minneapolis, Minnesota as a print music retail company. In the 1930s, the company expanded its inventory to include a full line of musical instruments, radios, records and other accessories. The downtown Minneapolis store location moved to South 10th Street in 1939, which is the location of the now-iconic Schmitt Music Wall mural.

In the early 1970s, many Minneapolis businesses were making efforts to beautify the city. Journalist Barbara Flanagan of the Minneapolis Star suggested that the large wall be painted with big and colorful notes. President Robert P. Schmitt agreed. The wall is painted with "Scarbo" a section of "Gaspard de la Nuit" by Maurice Ravel. The mural was completed in 1972, and was famously used as a backdrop for promotional photos for Prince in 1977.

The company headquarters moved to Brooklyn Center, Minnesota in 2001 and later to Bloomington, Minnesota in 2022, where it is currently located.
