= Schmit =

Schmit is a surname. Notable people with the surname include:

- Ady Schmit (born 1940), Luxembourgish footballer and manager
- Bob Schmit (born 1950), American football player
- Crazy Schmit (1866–1940), American baseball player
- Donny Schmit (1967–1996), American motorcycle racer
- Édouard Schmit (born 1930), Luxembourgish fencer
- Étienne Schmit (1889–1937), Luxembourgish politician and jurist
- Jean Schmit (1931–2010), Luxembourgish cyclist
- Lydie Schmit (1939–1988), Luxembourgish politician and educator
- Marc Schmit (born 1985), Luxembourgish sailor
- Mariette Schmit (born 1953), Luxembourgish fencer
- Matt Schmit, American politician
- Nicolas Schmit (born 1953), Luxembourgish politician
- Patrick Schmit (born 1974), Luxembourgish figure skater
- Summer Schmit (born 2003), American Paralympic swimmer
- Timothy B. Schmit (born 1947), American musician and songwriter
- Tomas Schmit (1943–2006), German artist and writer

== See also ==
- Schmitt (disambiguation)
- Schmidt (disambiguation)
