= C. L. Schmitt =

American politician

Member of the Pennsylvania House of Representatives from the 54th district
- In office 1969–1980
- Preceded by: District created
- Succeeded by: Terry E. VanHorne

Member of the Pennsylvania House of Representatives from the Westmoreland County district
- In office 1965–1968

Personal details
- Born: May 8, 1912 Pittsburgh, Pennsylvania
- Died: February 20, 1993 (aged 80) New Kensington, Pennsylvania
- Party: Democratic

Chester Ludwig Schmitt (May 8, 1912 – February 20, 1993) of New Kensington, Pennsylvania served in the Pennsylvania State Legislature for sixteen years, serving the 54th District. He is noted for working to establish the Pennsylvania Consumer Credit Act, which served as the model for the Federal Truth In Lending Law.

Schmitt was known to his constituents as "Mr. Consumer". A bridge built in 1927 to connect New Kensington to East Deer Township across the Allegheny River, was named in his honor in 1989.

== Formative years and family ==
Schmitt was married to Sally Lou Schmitt, a licensed insurance and real estate sales agent who was the co-manager of their business. They had four children and eight grandchildren.

== Career ==
Before and after his time in office, Schmitt owned a successful insurance and real estate company in New Kensington, which he opened in 1945.

He was president of the International Brotherhood of Magicians during the 1961-1962 membership year. Per that organization's house organ, The Linking Ring (Vol. 41, No. 5), his jobs previous to his time in office (and his later business interests) included being a newsboy, bowling alley pin-boy (and later, the alley's manager), movie projectionist and grocery chain store manager.

== Death ==
Schmitt died in 1993 from complications related to Parkinson's disease.
