= Stefan Schmitt =

Stefan Schmitt may refer to:

- Leo Stefan Schmitt, a German politician
- Stefan Schmitt (footballer), a German footballer
- Stefan Schmitt (politician), a German politician
