= Sebastian Schmitt (politician) =

German politician (born 1988)

Member of the Landtag of Saarland
- Incumbent
- Assumed office 25 April 2022
- Constituency: Saarlouis

Personal details
- Born: 31 October 1988 (age 37)
- Party: Social Democratic Party (since 2007)

Sebastian Schmitt (born 31 October 1988) is a German politician serving as a member of the Landtag of Saarland since 2022. He has served as chairman of the Social Democratic Party in Beckingen since 2020.
