= Roland Schmitt =

Roland Schmitt may refer to:

- Roland W. Schmitt (1923–2017), American physicist, business executive and president of Rensselaer Polytechnic Institute
- Roland Schmitt (French footballer) (1912–1954)
- Roland Schmitt (German footballer), manager of TSG 1899 Hoffenheim
