= Ana Carolina Schmitt =

Brazilian jiu-jitsu practitioner

- Born: Ana Carolina Schmitt; 6 January 1990 (age 36); Blumenau, Santa Catarina, Brazil
- Nickname: Aninha
- Division: Featherweight / Light featherweight
- Style: Brazilian jiu-jitsu
- Team: Espíndola Jiu-Jitsu
- Rank: Black belt in Brazilian jiu-jitsu

Ana Carolina Schmitt (born January 6, 1990) is a Brazilian Brazilian jiu-jitsu (BJJ) black belt competitor who has achieved major international titles on the IBJJF circuit.

== Career ==
Before starting Brazilian jiu-jitsu, she excelled in rhythmic gymnastics from the age of six, earning several medals and finishing second place in the Brazilian National Championship in the ball category. Her gymnastics career ended at age 12 after a spinal injury.

At 14, she began training Brazilian jiu-jitsu under professor Guilherme Neves. After Neves moved to Australia, she continued training under Juliano Wandalen, who awarded her the purple and brown belts. When Wandalen transitioned to MMA, Ana sought a more competition-oriented environment and joined the team of professor Marcos Cunha.

As she began competing more frequently, Schmitt traveled alone to the United States in 2014 to compete at the IBJJF World Championship. During her stay in California, she trained at Gracie Humaitá in San Diego under Fabrício Camões and Letícia Ribeiro. That same year, she won gold at the CBJJE World Championship and was promoted to black belt on the podium by Marcos Cunha.

Later, she moved to the United States by Leticia's Ribeiro invitation, joining the women’s high-performance team of Gracie Humaitá. After several years competing under that banner, she returned to Santa Catarina in 2017 and resumed representing Marcos Cunha’s team, continuing under his guidance.

== Style and characteristics ==
Ana Carolina is known for competing in the featherweight and light-featherweight divisions, two of the most competitive female categories in jiu-jitsu. In tournaments, she demonstrates strong versatility both in gi and no-gi, and she is known for adopting a balanced, strategic approach rather than relying solely on aggressive tactics.

== Main achievements ==
- 1st place – World IBJJF Jiu-Jitsu Championship (2019) – Black belt.
- 1st place – South American IBJJF Jiu-Jitsu Championship (2014).
- 1st place – IBJJF American Nationals (2016).
- 2nd place – World IBJJF Jiu-Jitsu Championship (2018).
- 3rd place – Pan IBJJF Jiu-Jitsu Championship (2017).
- 3rd place – European IBJJF Jiu-Jitsu Championship (2015).

== See also ==
- Sarah Galvão
- Helena Crevar
