= Friends Association for Higher Education =

Organization of Quaker-affiliated educational institutions

The Friends Association for Higher Education (FAHE) is a consortium of historically Quaker colleges, universities and study centers, as well as individual members, who support the Quaker ideal of integrating academic work with social responsibility and spiritual life. FAHE's seventeen member institutions are located in the United States, the United Kingdom and Kenya.

FAHE includes all who identify themselves with Quaker higher education, and affirms the beliefs and tenets which are shared by all Friends, such as peace, equality and stewardship.

== History ==
Quaker educators held a conference at Wilmington College June 22-23, 1980, to discuss how to strengthen Friends values in higher education. Participants included Landrum Bolling, Theodor Benfey, Charles Browning and T. Canby Jones.

At the end of the conference, the participants resolved to form an organization to further this work, and created FAHE. Its first office was located on the campus of Guilford College; since the 1990s, it has been based at Friends Center in Philadelphia.

== Activities ==
=== Annual Conference ===
Each June, FAHE members gather on the campus of one of the organization's member institutions for a conference. The agenda includes workshops and papers on various themes of concern to Quaker educators presented by members and other scholars, the annual meeting of the membership, and the writing and reading of an annual epistle.

The conference is occasionally enlarged to include Quakers involved in other aspects of education. In 1988 FAHE co-hosted the International Congress on Quaker Education with the Friends Council on Education.

In 2019 the conference was held at FAHE member institutions Swarthmore College and Pendle Hill in suburban Philadelphia. In June, 2020, FAHE will meet at Earlham College and Earlham School of Religion in Richmond, Indiana.

=== Publications ===
FAHE publishes a biannual electronic journal, Quaker Higher Education. Much of its content derives from papers and presentations from FAHE's annual conference.

In 2014, FAHE began publishing a book series entitled "Quakers and the Disciplines." Each annual volume examines the contributions of Friends to a particular area of scholarship: Volume 1 is an overview of Quaker pedagogy, Volume 2 focuses on philosophy, Volume 3 looks at Quakers in literature, Volume 4 examines Quakers in business and industry, Volume 5 covers Quakers in politics and economics, and Volume 6 features Quakers in sustainability and creation care.

=== Quaker College Fair ===
FAHE and Philadelphia Yearly Meeting co-sponsor an annual Quaker college fair in Philadelphia.

== See also ==
- List of Friends schools
