= Joshua Schmitt =

German politician (born 1998)

Member of the Landtag of Rhineland-Palatinate
- Incumbent
- Assumed office 18 May 2026
- Preceded by: Kathrin Anklam-Trapp
- Constituency: Rhein-Selz/Wonnegau

Personal details
- Born: 21 December 1998 (age 27)
- Party: Social Democratic Party (since 2016)

Joshua Schmitt (born 21 December 1998) is a German politician serving as a member of the Landtag of Rhineland-Palatinate since 2026. He is the group leader of the Social Democratic Party in the city council of Dienheim.
