= Bernard Schmitt =

Bernard Schmitt may refer to:

- Bernard Schmitt (economist) (1929–2014), French economist
- Bernard Schmitt (director), French director, e.g. of Pacific Palisades
- Bernard William Schmitt (1928–2011), American prelate of the Roman Catholic Church, Bishop of Wheeling-Charleston 1989-2004
