= Artur Schmitt (disambiguation) =

Artur Schmitt (1888–1972), German general and Knight's cross recipient

Artur or Arthur Schmitt may refer to:

- Artur Schmitt (gymnast) (1910–1989), German gymnast
- Arthur J. Schmitt (1893–1971), American engineer, inventor, entrepreneur and philanthropist
