= John Schmitt =

John Schmitt may refer to:

- John Schmitt (economist) (born 1962), American economist
- John Schmitt (American football) (born 1942), American football player
- John Schmitt (rower) (1901–1991), American rower
- John Schmitt (1856–1906), Greek scholar who edited the 1904 edition of The Chronicle of Morea

== See also ==
- John Schmidt, U.S. Associate Attorney General
- Jon Schmidt (born 1966), American pianist from Utah
