= Morgan Schmitt =

American racing cyclist (born 1985)

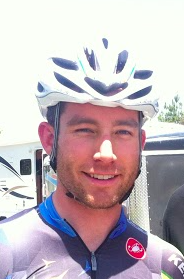
- Schmitt at the 2012 Tour of California.

Personal information
- Full name: Morgan Schmitt
- Born: January 3, 1985 (age 41) Ellensburg, Washington, United States
- Height: 1.78 m (5 ft 10 in)
- Weight: 66 kg (146 lb)

Cycling career
- Sport: Cycling
- Current team: Retired
- Discipline: Road
- Role: Rider
- Rider type: All-rounder

Amateur teams
- 2006: Broadmark Capitol
- 2014–2016: Canyon Bicycles–Shimano
- 2017: Arapahoe Resources

Professional teams
- 2007–2009: Priority Health–Bissell
- 2010–2011: UnitedHealthcare–Maxxis
- 2012: Team Exergy
- 2013: Jelly Belly–Kenda
- 2018: Holowesko Citadel p/b Arapahoe Resources

Morgan Schmitt (born January 3, 1985) is an American former professional road racing cyclist, who competed professionally between 2007 and 2013, and in 2018.

Born in Ellensburg, Washington, Schmitt currently resides in Seattle, Washington, United States. Schmitt is a University of Washington graduate.

== Major results ==
2007
8th Road race, National Under-23 Road Championships
2009
1st Stage 1 Sea Otter Classic
2010
4th Overall Tour de Beauce
2012
2nd Overall Sea Otter Classic
10th Overall Redlands Bicycle Classic
2013
3rd Overall Sea Otter Classic
10th Overall Nature Valley Grand Prix
2015
9th Overall Joe Martin Stage Race
2016
7th Overall Joe Martin Stage Race
