= Max Schmitt =

Max Schmitt may refer to:

- Max Schmitt, the subject of Max Schmitt in a Single Scull, an 1871 painting by Thomas Eakins
- Max Schmitt (footballer) (born 2006), German footballer

== See also ==
- Max Schmidt (1818–1901), German landscape painter
- Max Schmid (born 1964), Swiss rower
