= Terry Van Horne =

American politician

Terry E. Van Horne

Member of the Pennsylvania House of Representatives from the 54th district
- In office January 6, 1981 – November 30, 2000
- Preceded by: C. L. Schmitt
- Succeeded by: John Pallone

Personal details
- Born: February 24, 1946 Pittsburgh, Pennsylvania, U.S.
- Died: January 30, 2012 (aged 65) Pittsburgh, Pennsylvania, U.S.
- Party: Democratic
- Spouse: Jacqueline
- Education: Duquesne University; Widener University School of Law

Terry E. Van Horne (February 24, 1946 – January 30, 2012) was a former Democratic member of the Pennsylvania House of Representatives, where he represented the 54th legislative district.

He was born in Pittsburgh, Pennsylvania and graduated from Arnold High School in 1963. He earned a degree from Duquesne University in 1968 and a law degree from Widener University School of Law in 1993. He was first elected to the Pennsylvania House of Representatives in 1980, a position he held until 2000.

In 2000, Democratic Congressman Ron Klink vacated Pennsylvania's 4th congressional district to challenge Republican Rick Santorum for the United States Senate. Van Horne won an 8-way primary election to win the Democratic nominee to succeed Klink. He defeated the state and national party's preferred candidate, Matthew Mangino, the Lawrence County, Pennsylvania district attorney. Van Horne lost the election to then-Pennsylvania Senator Melissa Hart.

In July 2007, Van Horne was hired as the municipal manager for Penn Hills, Pennsylvania. He was fired by the Penn Hills municipal council in February 2009 and said that he was distracted by his duties as solicitor for East Deer Township, Pennsylvania and that he had failed to move into the municipality within the required time period.
