= Nicolas Schmitt =

Luxembourgish footballer

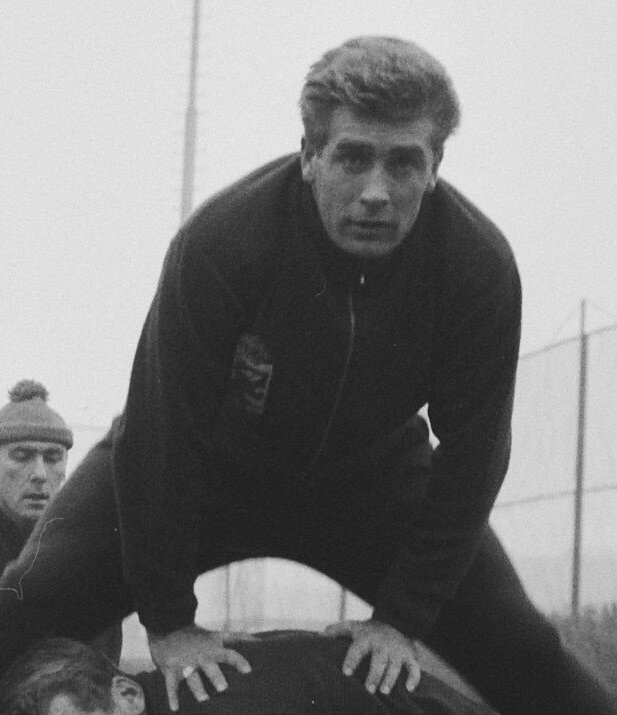
- Nicolas Schmitt training with Luxembourg before a game against Denmark on 18 December 1963

Personal information
- Date of birth: 3 October 1936 (age 90)

International career
Years	Team	Apps	(Gls)
1960–1965	Luxembourg	18	(0)

Nicolas Schmitt (born 3 October 1936) is a Luxembourgish footballer. He played in 18 matches for the Luxembourg national football team from 1960 to 1965.
