= Schmitten =

Schmitten may refer to:

- Schmitten, Germany, a climatic spa in the Hochtaunuskreis in Hesse, Germany
- Schmitten, Fribourg, a municipality in the canton of Fribourg, Switzerland
- Schmitten, Graubünden, a municipality in the canton of Graubünden, Switzerland
- Schmitten Discgolf Parcours, a disc golf course in Zell am See, Austria
- Schmitten Tunnel, a bypass tunnel and road tunnel in Salzburg, Austria
