= Alia =

Alia or ALIA may refer to:

== People ==
- Alia (name), a list of people with the surname or given name

== Places ==
- Alia, Sicily, Italy, a comune
- Alia (Phrygia), a town of ancient Phrygia which remains a Roman Catholic titular bishopric
- Alía, Spain, a municipality in Extremadura
- El Alia, Tunisia, a town and commune in the Bizerte Governorate

== Other uses ==
- Alia (gastropod), a genus of molluscs
- Alia, the former name of Royal Jordanian Airlines
- Australian Library and Information Association (ALIA)
- Beta Technologies Alia, an aircraft by Beta Technologies
- Chery A5, a 2006–2010 Chinese compact sedan, sold in Turkey as the Chery Alia
- AliA, a Japanese pop rock band

== See also ==
- Aaliyah (1979–2001), American R&B singer
- Aaliyah (disambiguation)
- Aliya (disambiguation)
- Aliyah (disambiguation)
- Allia (moth), a genus in the family Noctuidae
- Allia, a tributary of the River Tiber, Italy
  - Battle of the Allia, fought c. 390 BC between the Romans and the Senones
- Alya (disambiguation)
