= Medojevići =

Medojevići may refer to the following places:

- Medojevići, Ilijaš, Bosnia and Herzegovina
- Medojevići, Sokolac, Bosnia and Herzegovina

== See also ==
- Medojević, a surname
- Medoševići
