= Alijan =

Alijan or Ali Jan (Persian: عليجان) may refer to:

Ghana zafa

== People ==
- Ali Jan Aurakzai, Pakistani general
- Alijan Ibragimov, Uighur oligarch

== Villages ==
- Alijan, East Azerbaijan, in Bostanabad County, East Azerbaijan Province, Iran
- Alijan, Divandarreh, Kurdistan Province
- Ali Jan, Sanandaj, Kurdistan Province
- Ali Jan-e Pa'in, in the Central District of Birjand County, South Khorasan Province, Iran
- Alijan Beygi, Qahan Rural District, Khalajastan District, Qom County, Qom Province, Iran
- Qush-e Alijan, Central District of Sarakhs County, Razavi Khorasan Province, Iran

== See also ==
- Aali Jan
- Ali Jaan
- Alija
- Aljan
- Malijan (disambiguation)
