= Alya =

Alya may refer to:

- Alya (name), a female name
- Alya, the IAU-approved proper name of the primary component of the triple star system Theta Serpentis
- Alya Manasa (born 1992), Indian television actress
- Alya (singer) (born 1983), Slovenian pop singer
- `Alya', a village in Saudi Arabia

== See also ==
- Alia (disambiguation)
- Aliya (disambiguation)
- Aliyah (disambiguation)
- Aaliyah (1979–2001), American R&B singer
