= Ahmed Sudi =

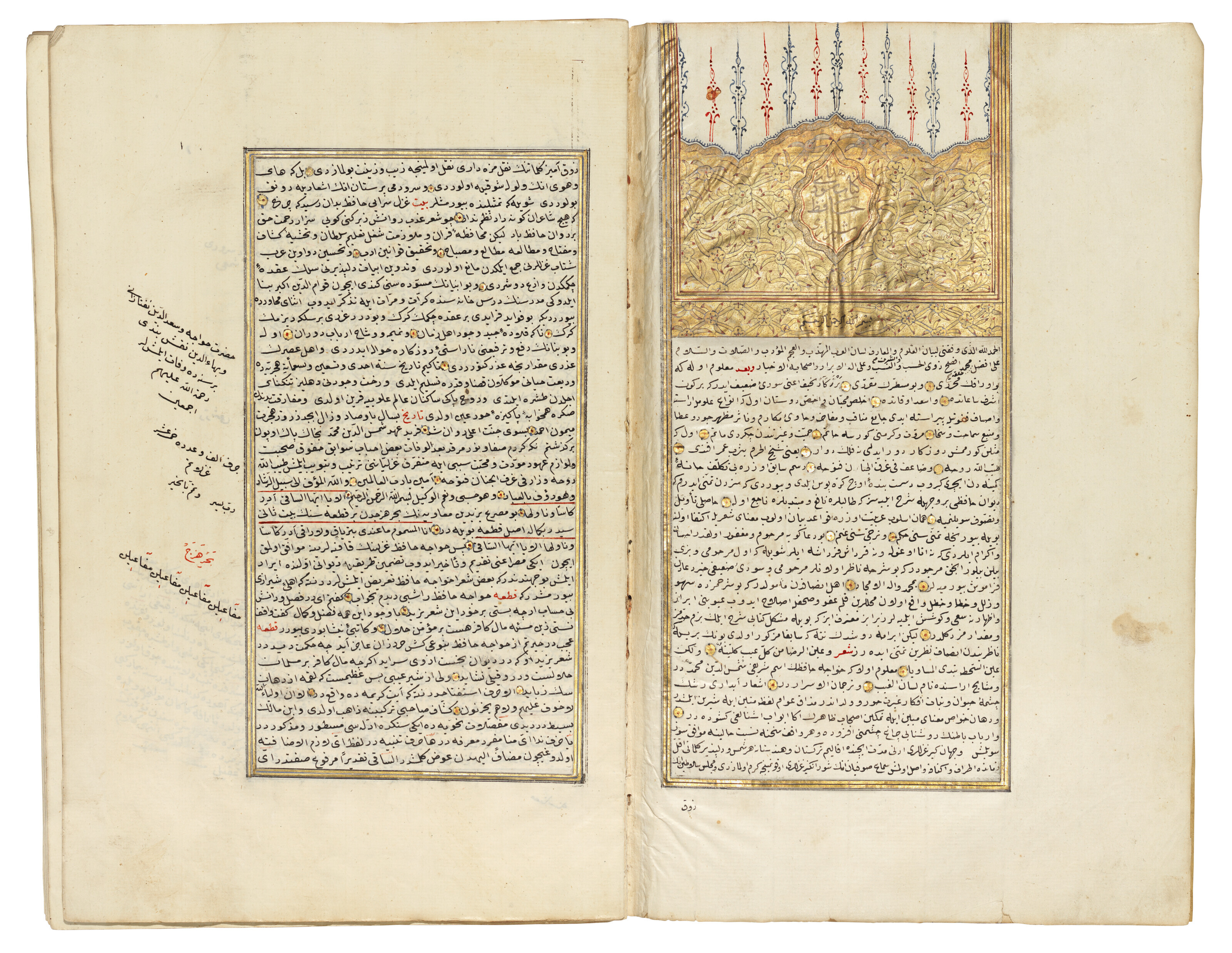
- Manuscript of Sudi's commentary on The Divān of Hafez. Dated 1821–2
- Born: Unknown; Sudići, Ottoman Empire
- Died: See Personal life Ottoman Empire
- Occupation: Commentator
- Writing career
- Language: Ottoman Turkish

Ahmed Sudi, (Note: Spelled "Ahmet" in modern Turkish and occasionally, apparently incorrectly, referred to as "Mehmet".) also known as Sudi-yi (or Ahmed-i) Bosnawi, was a 16th-century Bosnian commentator under the Ottoman Empire. He was the author of several Ottoman Turkish commentaries on Persian classics such as the Masnavi of Rumi, the Gulistan and Bostan of Saadi Shirazi, and The Divān of Hafez. According to Professor of Persian and Islamic studies Hamid Algar, Sudi is "perhaps the most prominent of all Ottoman Persianists".

== Biography ==
Sudi was born at an unknown date in Sudići near Foča in eastern Bosnia (present-day Bosnia and Herzegovina). His place of birth provided for his nisba Sudi. The names of his parents and details of his relatives in general are unknown. Sudi probably received early education in Foča, but he then apparently moved to Sarajevo as attested by a reference in his Sherh-i Gulistan, a commentary on the Gulistan of Saadi Shirazi. Like others from Bosnia, Sudi then moved to Constantinople (present-day Istanbul) in order to pursue education. At the time of his arrival, fellow Bosnian Sokollu Mehmed Pasha was the Ottoman Grand Vizier. Sudi then moved to the east, visiting Erzurum, before heading to Amed (present-day Diyarbakir) in the Diyarbekir Eyalet, where he met the Sunni Iranian emigré Mosleh al-Din Lari (died 1571). Sudi subsequently studied Persian under Lari.

While Lari was mainly interested in the religious sciences, Sudi wanted to dedicate his time to Persian literature. He then travelled to Damascus in Ottoman Syria (where he read the Gulistan with Halim-e Shirvani) followed by the cities of Baghdad, Najaf and Kufa in the Ottoman provinces that make up present-day Iraq. Sudi also undertook the Hajj. Sudi provided comments on the places he visited, and complained "about an ignorance of Persian and good Arabic among the people of Baghdad". He also reported on the condition of the mosques and tombs of Kufa, which according to Sudi, were in ruins. He did not visit Iran itself, but during all of his travels, he tried to "widen his knowledge of Persian", not merely through contact with scholars, but also according to himself by discussing difficult passages of the works of the aforementioned Persian poets Hafez and Saadi with Iranian merchants (the latter being "men of both trade and learning").

Back in Constantinople, he continued his studies, before being appointed teacher at the Ibrahim Pasha madrasa. One of his students, Mostarli Dervish Pasha (died 1603) would later mention Sudi in the preface of his own Murad-name.

== Works ==
In Constantinople, having returned from his travels in the east, Sudi started to write a series of commentaries in Ottoman Turkish on Persian classics such as the Masnavi of Rumi, the Gulistan (Sherh-i Gulistan) and Bostan of Saadi Shirazi, and The Divān of Hafez. Sudi's commentary on Hafez's divan was reportedly produced at the suggestion of Muhammad ibn Badr al-Din Muhyi'l-Din al-Munshi from Akhisar. The work was of such quality that it has remained relevant up to this day. His commentary on the Gulistan of Saadi remains the standard Turkish commentary. Burrill explains that Sudi's commentary on Hafez's divan outclasses that of Şem'i and Sürūrī, and it was used for editions by scholars of Persian and by Western orientalists.

Sudi in his Sherh-i Gulistan in many places criticizes the previous interpreters; one of the main targets of his critics is Shem'i. The commentary on Hafez was completed in Constantinople in 1594.

== Personal life ==
Sudi remained unmarried. His date of death varies depending on source. The professor of Persian and Islamic studies Hamid Algar gave Sudi's date of death as 1591 in the Encyclopædia Iranica. The professor of Turkish studies Kathleen Burill stated in the second edition of the Encyclopaedia of Islam that Sudi's date of death ranges from 1592-3 to after 8 May 1598. Regarding his beliefs, she explained:

Assumed to have adhered to the Ḥanafī law school, a charge that he suppressed from the Ḥāfiẓ corpus some poems of S̲h̲īʿī sympathy seems to have been disproved by lack of such poems in the earliest mss.

It is known that Sudi is buried in Yusuf Pasha mosque in Aksaray but the exact place of his tombstone is not clear.

== Sources ==
- Algar, Hamid (2003). "BOSNIA AND HERZEGOVINA". In Yarshater, Ehsan (ed.). Encyclopædia Iranica (Online ed.). Encyclopædia Iranica Foundation.
- Burrill, Kathleen (1997). "Sūdī". In Bosworth, C. E.; van Donzel, E.; Heinrichs, W. P. & Lecomte, G. (eds.). The Encyclopaedia of Islam, Second Edition. Volume IX: San–Sze. Leiden: E. J. Brill. ISBN 978-90-04-10422-8.
- Lewis, Franklin (2001). "GOLESTĀN-E SAʿDI". In Yarshater, Ehsan (ed.). Encyclopædia Iranica. Vol. XI/1: Giōni–Golšani. London and New York: Routledge & Kegan Paul. pp. 79–86. ISBN 978-0-933273-60-3.
