= Aaliyah (disambiguation) =

Aaliyah (1979–2001) was an American singer and actress.

Aaliyah may also refer to:

== Music ==
- Aaliyah (album), the singer's self-titled 2001 album
- "Aaliyah", a song by Katy B on the 2014 album Little Red
- "Aaliyah", a song by Rapsody on the 2019 album Eve

== Other uses ==
- Aaliyah (given name)
- Aaliya, a character portrayed by Katrina Kaif in the 2013 Indian film Dhoom 3

== See also ==
- Aliyah, the immigration of Jews to Israel
- Aliyah (disambiguation)
- Aliya, a feminine given name of Arabic origin
- Alia (disambiguation)
