= Alija =

Alija is both a surname and a given name. Notable people with the name include:

== Surname ==
- Kučuk Alija (died 1804), janissary, mutesellim of Kragujevac and one of four Dahiyas who controlled Belgrade Pashaluk

== Given name – female ==
- Alija Jussupowa (born 1984), rhythmic gymnast of Kazakh ethnicity who competes for Kazakhstan

== Bosnian given name – male ==
- Alija Alijagić (1896–1922), Bosnian communist and assassin
- Alija Behmen (1940–2018), former mayor of Sarajevo and a member of the Social Democratic Party of Bosnia and Herzegovina
- Alija Bešić (born 1975), retired Luxembourgish professional football player of Bosnian descent
- Alija Đerđelez, popular legendary hero of poetry and literature in Bosnia and Albania
- Alija Dumas (1929–2023), former Democratic member of the Pennsylvania House of Representatives
- Alija Gušanac (fl. 1804–05), Albanian Ottoman brigand
- Alija Isaković (1932–1997), Bosnian writer, publicist and lexicographer of Bosnian
- Alija Izetbegović (1925–2003), the first President of Bosnia and Herzegovina
- Alija Krnić (born 1993), Montenegrin footballer
- Alija Sirotanović (1914–1990), Yugoslav miner of Bosniak ethnicity, Hero of Socialist Labour
- Alija Solak (born 1944), Bosnian footballer
- Alija Šuljak (1901–1992), Bosnian Muslim Croat politician and Ustaše military officer

== Fictional characters ==
- Alija Eaglespike of Warrior, a fantasy novel written by Australian author Jennifer Fallon

== See also ==
- Alija del Infantado, a municipality which is part of Tierra de La Bañeza comarca, an autonomous community of Castile and León, Spain
- Alia (name)
- Aliya
- Alijan (disambiguation)
- Alinja
- Avlija
- Balija
- Galija
- Malija
- Salija
