= Alia (name) =

Alia or Aleah is a surname and a feminine given name, in both cases variations of the name Aaliyah. Of Arabic origin, the name means "high" or "exalted". Notable people with these names include:

== Surname ==
- Gjergj Elez Alia, a legendary hero of poetry and literature in Bosnia and Albania
- Giuseppe Alia, murderer of Father Leo Heinrichs (1867–1908)
- Malek Aït Alia (born 1977), Algerian footballer
- Ramiz Alia (1925–2011), second and last Communist leader of Albania (1985–1991) and head of state (1982–1992)

== Given name ==
=== Alia ===
- Alia Abdulnoor (1977–2019), Emirati imprisoned woman
- Alia Ahmed (born 2009), Egyptian rhythmic gymnast
- Alia Ali, American visual artist of Bosnian and Yemeni heritage
- Alia Atkinson (born 1988), Jamaican swimmer and five-time Olympian
- Alia Bano, British playwright of Pashtun origin
- Alia Bhatt (born 1993), Indian actress
- Alia Ghanem, birth name of Hamida al-Attas (born 1934), mother of Osama bin Laden
- Alia al-Hussein (1948–1977), Queen of Jordan
- Princess Alia bint Al Hussein (born 1956), eldest child of King Hussein of Jordan
- Alia Janine (born 1977 or 1978) American former pornographic actress turned comedian
- Alia Mamdouh (born 1944), Iraqi novelist, author and journalist
- Alia Ouabdelsselam (born 1978), French ice dancer
- Alia Penner (born 1985/1986), American pop artist
- Alia Humaid Al Qassimi, Emirati surgeon
- Alia Sabur (born 1989), American materials scientist and world's youngest professor
- Alia Shawkat (born 1989), American actress
- Princess Alia Tabba (born 1964), Jordanian princess

=== Aleah ===
- Aleah Chapin (born 1986), American painter
- Aleah Stanbridge (1976–2016), South African singer-songwriter, former singer of death/doom metal band Trees of Eternity

== Fictional characters ==
- Alia Atreides, in the Dune universe created by Frank Herbert
- Alia, in the Mega Man X video game series

== See also ==
- Alija, a surname and a given name
- Aliya, an Arabic given name that is the feminine form of Ali, meaning "high" and "exalted" (also spelled Aaliyah or Alia)
- Aliah
