= Batkovići =

Batkovići may refer to the following places:

== Places in Bosnia and Herzegovina ==
- Batkovići, Čajniče
- Batkovići, Goražde
- Batkovići, Nevesinje

== Places in Serbia ==
- Batkovići, Priboj
