= Nedîm =

Ottoman poet

Nedîm Effendi
- نديم
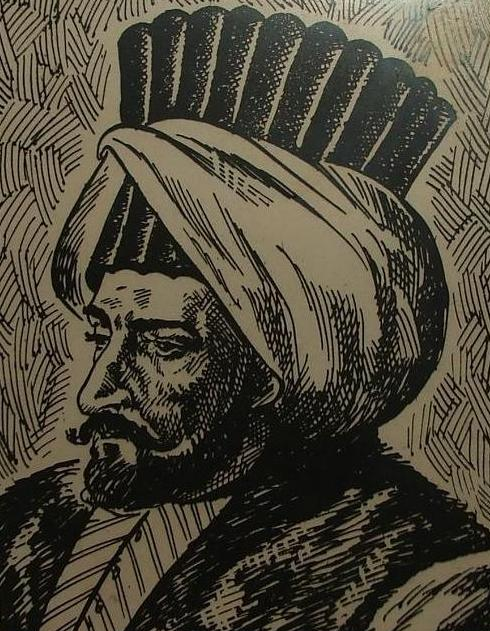
- A later artist's impression of Nedîm, no extant contemporary depictions of him exist.
- Born: Ahmed c. 1681; Constantinople (present-day Istanbul), Ottoman Empire
- Died: 1730 (aged 48–49); Beşiktaş, Constantinople, Ottoman Empire
- Resting place: Karacaahmet Cemetery, Scutari, Constantinople, Ottoman Empire
- Occupations: Poet; scholar
- Spouse: Ümmü Gülsüm Hanım
- Writing career
- Language: Ottoman Turkish; Persian
- Period: Tulip Era
- Genres: Ghazal; Qasida; Şarkı
- Movement: Diwan vernacularism (Turkish: Mahallîleşme)

Ahmed Effendi, better known by his mahlas (nom de plume) Nedîm (Ottoman Turkish: نديم; c. 1681 – 1730), was an Ottoman lyric poet of the Tulip Period. He achieved his greatest fame during the reign of Ahmed III. He was known for his slightly decadent, even licentious poetry often couched in the most staid of classical formats, but also for bringing the folk poetic forms of türkü and şarkı into the court.

== Life ==
=== Early life ===
Not much is known about Nedîm's early life, except for what can be inferred from records of the time. Nedîm (then Ahmed) was born in Constantinople, most likely in 1681. His pre-nomial Mülakkabzâde (lit. descendant of the nicknamed [man]) was given to him as a result of his grandfather Merzifonlu Mülakkab Mustafa Muslihiddin Efendi; a kazasker who was known as a "man of unusual preferences", and was nicknamed as such, before being lynched in front of the Sultan Ahmed Mosque in 1648.

As the son of Kadı Mehmed Effendi, and a family vested in Ottoman bureaucracy, Nedîm's education is thought to be quite robust, including a variety of sciences, as well as "enough Arabic and Persian to write poetry." Following this education, he passed an examination process led by Shaykh-al Islam Ebezâde Abdullah Effendi, and started work as a scholar in a madrasa. While the exact date of this examination is unknown, it is known that Nedîm had already started to publish poetry by this time. Despite this, he continued to work as a teacher and scholar, in schools such as the Molla Kırîmî, Nişancı Pasha-yı Atîk, and Sekban Ali Pasha madrasas, eventually becoming a leading scholar in the Sahn-ı Seman Madrasas while teaching various subjects until his death in 1730.

=== Active years ===
While his first poems were most probably published before this, Nedîm's more traditional qasidas had become quite well known by the start of Ahmed III's reign in 1703; these had helped him obtain connections with high-ranking officials, such as Nevşehirli Damat Ibrahim Pasha, who would later offer him patronage, as he considered Nedîm's odes to be superior to other poetry written to his name.

Nedîm was, however, better known for the challenge he provided to the literary environment of Constantinople, which by then strongly favored the Nâbî school; a school of highly philosophical, almost didactic ghazals. In this environment, which left little space to Nedîm's lyric style, he came to be known as the pioneer of his Nedîmâne school of poetry; emphasizing inventiveness, vernacular diction, and a certain licentiousness. His works suggest that he was aware of the innovative nature of his poetry, as he claims this status in multiple poems:

Ma‘lûmdur benim sühanım mahlas istemez
Fark eyler onu şehrimizin nüktedânları

My word is obvious, it doesn't need my name,
The writers of our city can recognize it as mine.

— Nedîm

During these years, Nedîm was noted as an accomplished teacher, being invited to huzur sessions in Ramadan for his knowledge on Islamic matters, while also being highly productive; climbing through the ranks of Ottoman bureaucracy in various fields: as a scholar, chief librarian, translator of historical works, naîb (an assistant to the kadı), and, later, the sultan's nedîm (lit. companion); all while continuing to write poetry.

Nedîm's unique lyric style, vernacular vocabulary, and literary innovation had already caught the eye of many observers during this lifetime, including that of noted tezkire author Sâlim, who praised him as the taze-zebân (lit. fresh-tongued) poet of his era. Others, such as occasional poets Râşid and Âsım, embraced his school of poetry by writing tanzîrs (pastiches) of his works. Despite this early bout of fame, he was not nearly celebrated to the extent that he is today, and his collected poems would not be organized into and printed as a Diwan until 1736.

=== Final years ===
The nature of Nedîm's final years are often disputed, with different sources claiming different causes of death, as well as different series of events. Well known, however, is his mental illness (illet-i vehîme, lit. anxiety disorder), frequent use of alcohol and opium, as well as his "already fragile nature". Sources do state that he was married to Ümmügülsüm Hanım, and that they had a daughter named Lübâbe before his death, however, not much information about this marriage exists.

Most sources claim that he died during the Patrona Halil Rebellion. Some, including biographer Süleyman Sâdeddin, assert that his death was an accident; that he fell from the roof of his house during the rebellion. Others, including Muhsin Macit, argue that he climbed the roof of his house to avoid a similar fate to that of his grandfather, which eventually led to his fall. Other sources claim that he could have died of tremors, most likely from substance abuse or a disease resembling Parkinson's. Either way, it is known that he remained a scholar at the Sekban Ali Pasha Madrasa up until his last days.

== Work ==
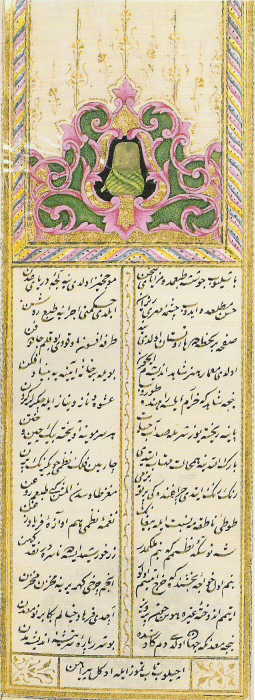
Introductory page from the Dîvân-ı Nedîm, Nedim's collected works

Nedim is now generally considered, along with Fuzûlî and Bâkî, to be one of the three greatest poets in the Ottoman Divan poetry tradition. It was not, however, until relatively recently that he came to be seen as such: in his own time, for instance, the title of reîs-i şâirân (رئيس شاعران), or "leader of poets", was given by Sultan Ahmed III not to Nedim, but to the now relatively obscure poet Osmanzâde Tâib, and several other poets as well were considered superior to Nedim in his own day. This relative lack of recognition may have had something to do with the sheer newness of Nedim's work, much of which was rather radical for its time.

Nedîm's works are a diverse collection; consisting of 170 ghazals, 34 şarkıs, 44 qasidas, 88 strophic forms, 3 mathnawis, 11 rubais and 2 koşmas, as well as a few poems of other forms. More traditional poems are also interspersed with works often claimed to be satires of said traditional forms, as well as avant-garde poems in his collection. Because of this diversity, as well as cultural forces such as modernization, nationalism and heteronormativity, Nedîm's poems have been analyzed in a range of different, and sometimes contradictory ways. According to H. A. R. Gibb, for instance, Nedîm's school of poetry could have been described as a local, vernacular style of lyric poetry that makes use of "realistic descriptions of women", with a worldly focus and a lack of interest in Sufi mysticism. However, these older descriptions have faced criticism, notably by Stephen Murray and others, for being shaped by certain ideological and cultural forces.

=== Vernacularism ===
The early 18th century, defined by the Ottoman Old Regime and the Tulip period, was a relatively peaceful period in Ottoman history. This environment allowed Ottoman art to enjoy a renaissance; the old musical canon was renewed and partially replaced, architecture took on perceptible European and Safavid influence, and poetry written in a more local, less Persianate Ottoman Turkish flourished. Nedîm's poetry is specifically considered a pioneering work in this sense, influencing later poets such as Enderunlu Fazıl.

His writing style, often described as "joyful" and "melodious", was aimed at bridging the gap between folk and art literature; adopting the prose register of Ottoman Turkish, referring to beloveds in concrete, clear terms, and using a relatively narrow, local vocabulary. He was, according to Mazıoğlu, the "primary representative of the joyous, high-spirited nature of the Tulip period."

Despite this, there is wide consensus that there were aspects of Nedîm's poetry which borrow heavily from earlier traditional poetry, especially in his qasida odes and panegyrics, and Ziya Avşar argues that his usual high-spirited style was mainly an artistic choice, rather than being reflective of his state of mind. Tanpınar and Avşar both argue that there are traces of sadness in his poems that are more typical of Ottoman Diwan poems than vernacular Turkish poetry, which Avşar argues to be prominent in these lines:

Bir nîm-neşve say bu cihânın bahârını
Bir sâgar-ı keşîdeye tut lâle-zârını

Assume this world's spring to be half as happy,
Assume its flowery [joy] to be a used wine-glass.

— Nedîm

There have also been researchers, such as Muhsin Macit, who have characterized Nedîm's poetic style as less an innovation and more a synthesis of earlier avant-garde tendencies, which until then had not become widespread. Indeed, it is known that Nedîm had admired the poetry of earlier Diwan poets, such as Fuzûlî, Nef‘î, Bâkî, Yahyâ, Nev‘îzâde Atâî and Azmîzâde Mustafa Hâletî. However, Macit does accept that his lack of symbolism when referring to lovers is almost certainly new.

=== Architecture and praise of Constantinople ===
Nedîm is well known for his praise of Constantinopolitan architecture, which Mehmet Kaplan suggests to be his most prominent aspect. Many authors, including Kortantamer, single out his praise of Constantinople as one of his most innovative facets, which Nilüfer Karadavut describes it as realist; praising his ability to depict a real city in poetic form. Nevertheless, Karadavut also points out that his depiction of Constantinople frequently engages in symbolism and hyperbole more typical of Ottoman poets, which is seen in these lines:

Bu şehr-i Stanbul ki bî-misl ü bahâdır
Bir sengine yek-pâre Acem mülkü fedadır

[O], city of Istanbul, priceless and peerless!
I would sacrifice all of Persia for one of your stones!

— Nedîm

His interest in architecture is likely because of his participation in state gatherings, and so-called "halva nights", where the state bureaucracy would spend time together in major locations around Constantinople. He seems to have had a great affinity with these nights, describing them as "assemblies that Alexander could not have imagined in his dreams". In his qasidas, lively descriptions of Ramadan days are interspersed with praises for the architecture of Sa'd-âbâd, which he portrays as "the highest level of paradise". Meanwhile, locations such as the Hippodrome, Eyüp, Üsküdar, Kasr-ı Cinân, Çeşme-i Nur, Cetvel-i Sim, Nev-Peyda, Hayr-âbâd, Ferkadan and Cesr-i Sürur are repeatedly praised in his poems, specifically in his Ode to Sa'd-âbâd (Sa'd-âbâd Kasîdesi). Along with his qasidas, he seems to have noted down features and scenes from the city, and later used them in his chronogram (tarih) poems, most of which he wrote for the Grand Vizier of the time, İbrahim Paşa.

=== Satire of tradition ===
Ottoman poetic tradition, being an offshoot of Persian poetry, was one that often made use of highly symbolic, ideal beloveds and hopeless, desperate lovers, specifically in its lyrics. This detached attitude seems to have left Nedîm unsatisfied, and some of his most notable works are often identified as satires of this tradition. Nedîm mentions this in a ghazal:

Yok bu şehr içre senin vasfetdiğin dilber Nedîm
Bir perî sûret görünmüş bir hayâl olmuş sana

[O] Nedim; the beauty you praise, they don't exist in this city,
A fairy-face has become your visions, your daydream.

— Nedîm

Gültekin argues, using this line as well as the rest of the ghazal, that this is a criticism of the idealized beloved present in much of Ottoman poetry and that Nedim states, in satirical fashion, that a person of such standards can not be found in all of Constantinople. Earlier in the same ghazal, he mentions the process of a rolling mill to describe how his beloved came to be made, which Gültekin purports to be humorous criticism of how unachievable the body standards mentioned in traditional poetry would have been. Other poems of his, such as the so-called "infidel" poem, generally read as Nedîm describing his love for a person whose gender he can not figure out, could, according to Gültekin, also be related back to his criticism of gender ambiguity in traditional Ottoman poetry. The lines in which this is most obvious is the following:

Kız oğlan nâzı nâzın şehlevend âvâzı âvâzın
Belâsın ben de bilmem kız mısın oğlan mısın kâfir

Your coquetry is the coquetry of a young woman, your voice the voice of a handsome [young] man,
What a torment you are! I do not know whether you are young woman or a young man, [O] infidel!

— Nedîm

Despite this, not all scholars of Nedîm agree that he had satirical intent. Avşar argues that the "daydream" poem reflects Nedîm's pessimism, on how worldly pleasures can never truly mend his pains, and how the love that could do such a thing is purely imaginary. Avşar further argues that what could easily be perceived as satire of poetic tradition, can also be interpreted as an emotional outcry or even subtle political criticism, principally of the unsustainability of the Tulip Era, which would ultimately cause the Ottoman Empire to fall behind Western powers in terms of technology around 20 years later.

=== Homoeroticism ===
While Ottoman poetry was largely preoccupied by love in a lyric sense, explicitly erotic, and especially homoerotic literature was "far from absent" in the Ottoman Empire. Writers often mentioned erotic details even in the most staid of classical forms, and to this Nedîm was no exception.

In the 17th century, anti-Sufi polemic and conservative movements in the Islamic world "eroded toleration of social, sexual, and spiritual diversity", marking a "conservative turn" from a more tolerant 16th century. Nedîm wrote his poetry during a revival of erotic sensibilities in the 18th century, about the time when the effects of the previous "conservative turn" was coming to an end, setting him apart from other poets of his era.

Furthermore, Nedîm seems to have subverted the ideals of Ottoman erotic poetry, as erotic desire in his works seem to also be directed towards older men, in stark contrast to the mostly pederastic norms of erotic literature at the time. In a poem, Nedîm mentions how his lover is kissable "from hair to hair"; this, according to Murray, can only be used to refer to an adult male. Homoerotic themes can also be found in his frequent usage of the phrase serv-i revân (flowing cypress), which is a gendered term in the context of Ottoman poetic tropes, referring almost exclusively to tall men.

=== Intercultural and interfaith aspects ===
Due to the empire's cultural and religious diversity, Ottoman poetry often involved "interfaith love", that is, generally, love between a Muslim lover and a dhimmi beloved. Such characterizations are typical of Nedîm, and Matthias Kappler singles out Nedîm as a prolific author of interfaith love poems. According to Kappler, the "infidel" lover in Nedîm's poetry (and Ottoman poetry in general) represents some level of paradoxical incompatibility between lover and beloved, and the idea that cultural, religious and sexual diversity is necessary for a "perfect" human relationship. Therefore, the "infidel" stands both for the attractiveness of the beloved and their unreachability. Kappler gives this as an example:

Hâl kafir zülf kâfir çeşm kafir el-amân
Ser-be-ser iklîm-i hüsnün kâfiristân oldı hep

The mole is infidel, the curl is infidel, the eye is infidel, alas!
From end to end the country of your beauty has become the land of the infidels!

— Nedîm

=== Sufism and philosophy ===
While there is wide consensus that Nedîm's focus was not on Sufism or philosophy, there is dispute on his religiosity and philosophical beliefs. It is known that he did want to join a tariqa at one point, however most dispute that he was a member. Some researchers, including Gölpınarlı, suggest that his religious beliefs might not have been fully genuine. Others, such as Muhsin Macit, have pointed out a lack of a "greater power" in Nedîm's poems, arguing that "[in his works], everything seems to happen on its own." Furthermore, he seems to have been dismissive of earlier philosophical traditions, to the point of openly disliking both Plato and Aristotle, calling their supporters "confused"; whether this was his genuine thoughts is however still debated.

== Bibliography ==
- Andrews, Walter G. "Nedim" in Ottoman Lyric Poetry: An Anthology. pp. 253–255. ISBN 0-292-70472-0.
- Gölpınarlı, Abdülbâkî; ed. Nedim Divanı. İstanbul: İnkılâp ve Aka Kitabevleri Koll. Şti., 1972.
- Kudret, Cevdet. Nedim. ISBN 975-10-2013-1.
- Mansel, Philip. Constantinople: City of the World's Desire, 1453–1924. London: Penguin Books, 1997.
- Şentürk, Ahmet Atilla. "Nedîm" in Osmanlı Şiiri Antolojisi. pp. 596–607. ISBN 975-08-0163-6.
