= Humaid Saqer Al-Qasimi =

Member of the UAE Sharjah Ruling Family

- Born: 1955; Sharjah
- Died: 1 September 2003 (aged 48); Sharjah, UAE
- Occupation: Member of Sharjah Ruling Family Al-Qasimi
- Children: Khalid Humaid Saqer Al-Qasimi, Abdul Aziz, Saqer, Alia Humaid Al Qassimi
- Relatives: Sultan bin Muhammad Al-Qasimi

Humaid Saqer Al-Qasimi (Arabic: حميد بن صقر القاسمي) was a Member of the Sharjah Ruling Family Al-Qasimi (plural: Al Qawasem القواسم), one of the six ruling families of the United Arab Emirates and who ruled two of the seven emirates: Sharjah and Ras al-Khaimah.

== Death ==
On 1 September 2003, Sheikh Dr. Sultan bin Muhammad Al-Qasimi, Supreme Council Member and Ruler of Sharjah and Sheikh Saqr bin Mohammed al-Qasimi, Member of the Supreme Council Ruler of Ras Al-Khaimah received condolences for the death of Sheikh Humaid bin Saqr bin Humaid Al Qasimi.

On 15 September 2003, King Fahd bin Abdul Aziz sent a cable of condolence to Sheikh Sultan bin Muhammad Al-Qasimi, Member of the Supreme Council of the United Arab Emirates, Ruler of Sharjah and his family, expressing his sadness at the death of Sheikh Humaid bin Saqr bin Humaid Al Qasimi.
