= Aliye =

Aliye (IPA: [aliːˈje]) is a Turkish feminine given name. It comes from the Arabic Aliyah. People named Aliye include:

== Given name ==
- Aliye Berger (1903–1974), Turkish artist, engraver, and painter
- Aliye Rona (1921–1996), Turkish film actress
- Aliye Uzunatağan (born 1951), Turkish Theater, cinema and TV series actor, voice actor, director

== Middle name ==
- Fatma Aliye Topuz (1862–1936), Turkish novelist and women's rights activist
- Selma Aliye Kavaf (born 1962), Turkish politician

== See also ==
- Aliya, given name
- Ali (name)
