= Lađevci =

Lađevci may refer to:

- Lađevci (Kraljevo), Serbia
- Lađevci (Čajniče), Republika Srpska, Bosnia and Herzegovina
- Lađevci (Čelinac), Republika Srpska, Bosnia and Herzegovina
- Lađevci Airport, in Serbia
