= Kapov =

Kapov (masculine; Russian: Капов, Belarusian: Капаў) or Kapova (feminine) may refer to

- Kapov Han, a village in Bosnia and Herzegovina
- Kapova Cave, a limestone karst cave in Bashkortostan, Russia
- Jadranka Skorin-Kapov (born 1955), American-Croatian writer
- Yawhen Kapaw (born 1977), Belarusian professional footballer
