= Wobalem Tezazu-Mekonnen =

- וובעלם טזזו-מקונן
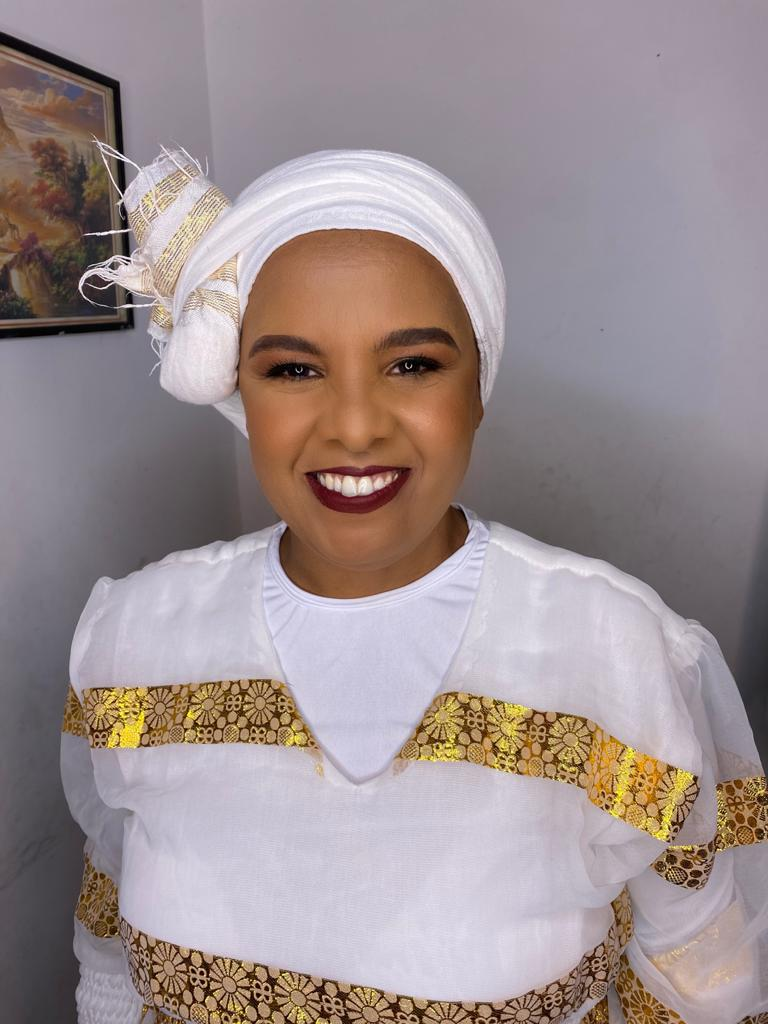
- Tezazu-Mekonnen in 2021.

Wobalem Tezazu-Mekonnen (Hebrew: וובעלם טזזו-מקונן) is an author of books for children, coach and social activist for the Ethiopian community in Israel.

== Early life ==
Wobalem Tezazu-Mekonnen was born in a small village in the Gondar region of northern Ethiopia in 1975 and immigrated to Israel during Operation Moses in 1984, at the age of 9, together with her mother and eight older siblings. She grew up in Petah Tikva. After completing her Sherut Leumi as a mentor for teenagers at risk in Bnei Brak she enrolled at Bar-Ilan University, obtaining a degree in Human Resources and a master's course in education. Tezazu-Mekonnen also has a senior diploma in coaching from the ICCM college. She has also completed a certificate in educational leadership at Tel Aviv University alongside a teaching certificate in Talmud. She lectures in many areas of personal, social, and family empowerment.

== Career ==
In 1991, she volunteered for the Traffic Accidents Prevention Council of the Petah Tikva Municipality, and since then she has been involved in various volunteer activities such as volunteering with a group of coaches at events for the children of the Alumim boarding school in Kfar Saba or at Perach Child Mentoring and volunteering at the ISF Foundation in Petah Tikva and the Hatikva neighborhood in Tel Aviv.

Between the years 2019–2020, she managed the Emuna daycare center at Bar-Ilan University, in addition to being a visiting officer in the Central District for the Ministry of Education of Israel.

Tezazu-Mekonnen has published three therapeutic books for children, parents, and teachers. Her first book, מסע (Journey) is a book about dealing with life's challenges from a positive perspective, based in the life story of Tezazu-Mekonnen from the day she was born in Ethiopia until she made aliya and established in Israel. Her second book, ילדה כהה, ילדה בהירה ("Dark-skinned girl, Light-skinned girl") is a book about accepting the different, based also on her personal experience as a Beta Israel immigrant encountering racism.

Her most recent book, מילות הקסם של רועי ("Roy's Magic Words") is a book about how to deal with personal fears.

== Personal life ==
Tezazu-Mekonnen is married to Shai Mekonnen and a mother of one girl, Tehila, and one boy, Roi.

== Works ==
- מסע - Tzivonim Publishing, 2017.
- ילדה כהה, ילדה בהירה - Tzivonim Publishing, 2018
- מילות הקסם של רועי - Orion Publishing, 2019
