= Karovići =

Karovići may refer to the following places in Bosnia and Herzegovina:

- Karovići (Trnovo)
- Karovići (Čajniče)
- Karovići (Novo Goražde)
