= Ottoman poetry =

Oral compositions and written texts of the Ottoman Empire

The poetry of the Ottoman Empire, or Ottoman Divan poetry, is little known outside modern Turkey, which forms the heartland of what was once the Ottoman Empire. It is, however, a rich and ancient poetic tradition that lasted for nearly 700 years, and one whose influence can still be felt in the modern Turkish poetic tradition.

Even in modern Turkey, however, Ottoman Divan poetry is a highly specialist subject. Much of this has to do with the fact that Divan poetry is written in Ottoman Turkish, which was written using a variant of the Arabic script and made extensive use of Arabic and Persian words, making the language vastly different from modern Turkish. In its own time, knowledge of this form of literary Turkish was largely limited to the educated classes.

== History ==
The Ottoman Divan poetry tradition embraced the influence of the Persian and, to a lesser extent, Arabic literatures. As far back as the pre-Ottoman Seljuk period in the late 11th to early 14th centuries CE, this influence was already being felt: the Seljuks conducted their official business in the Persian language, rather than in Turkish, and the poetry of the Seljuk court was highly inflected with Persian.

When the Ottoman Empire arose in northwestern Anatolia, it continued this tradition. The most common poetic forms of the Ottoman court, for instance, were derived either directly from the Persian literary tradition (the gazel; the mesnevî), or indirectly through Persian from the Arabic (the kasîde). However, the decision to adopt these poetic forms wholesale led to two important further consequences:

- the poetic meters (Persian: beher (Arabic: بَحْر); Turkish: aruz (Arabic: عَرُوض)) of Persian poetry were adopted.
- Persian- and Arabic-based words were brought into the Turkish language in great numbers, as Turkish words rarely worked well within the system of the Persian poetic meter.

Out of this confluence of choices, the Ottoman Turkish language—which was always highly distinct from standard Turkish—was effectively born. This style of writing under Persian and Arabic influence came to be known as "Divan literature" (Turkish divân edebiyatı), as divân was the Ottoman Turkish word referring to the collected works of a poet.

Beginning with the Tanzimat reform period (1839–1876) of Ottoman history and continuing until the dissolution of the empire in the early 20th century, the Divan poetic tradition steadily dwindled, and more and more influence from both Turkish folk literature and European literature began to make itself felt.

== Divan ==
=== Kaside ===
Kaside is generally about God, religious or government leaders and their values. Most famous poets are Ahmed Paşa, Necati, Bâkî, Nedîm, most importantly Nef'i.

Terminology:

- Tevhid: About the Unity of God.
- Münacaat: Prayer to God
- Naat: About religious leaders and the prophet.
- Methiye: About the sultan and government leaders.
- Nesip or teşbib: Nature and environment descriptions.
- Girizgah: Prelude to the topic.
- Fahriye: Praising the poet himself
- Dua: Prayer and well wishing for the subject of the poem

== See also ==
- Kashifi
- Gazel
- Persian metres
- Şemi

== Bibliography ==
- Gibb, E.J.W. Ottoman Literature: The Poets and Poetry of Turkey. ISBN 0-89875-906-4.
- Tanpınar, Ahmet Hamdi. 19'uncu Asır Türk Edebiyatı Tarihi. İstanbul: Çağlayan Kitabevi, 1988.
