= Alijagić =

Alijagić is a surname. Notable people with the surname include:

- Alija Alijagić (1896–1922), Bosnian communist assassin
- Denis Alijagić (born 2003), Czech footballer of Bosnian descent

== See also ==
- Alija
