= ESAS =

Esas is a village in Iran.

ESAS may refer to:

- Easy Star All-Stars, an American/Jamaican reggae collective
- Edmonton Symptom Assessment System
- European Society of Aesthetic Surgery
- Exploration Systems Architecture Study
- European Scandinavian Airlines System; see History of Scandinavian Airlines System (pre-1952)
- East Siberia Arctic Shelf

== See also ==
- ESA (disambiguation)
