= Aaliyah (given name) =

Aaliyah (Arabic: علية or عالية) is an Arabic female given name, and is a common name for girls born to Muslim families. In 2007, an increase in usage was attributed to the fame of the American pop singer Aaliyah (1979–2001).

== Origin ==
In Hebrew, ʿaliyah (also commonly transliterated as aliyah) means "ascent," "rising," or "going up." The word is found in various parts of the Tanakh to refer to this concept. The word is often used to refer to the calling of a member of a Jewish congregation up to the bimah for a segment of the formal Torah reading. It may also refer to the immigration of Jews from the diaspora to the geographical Land of Israel (i.e. "making aliyah").

In Arabic, aaliyah is derived from the verb "alah" which means "to ascend" or "to go up". As a given name, it is the feminine form of Aali, meaning "high" or "exalted". Aaliyah is also associated with Aliya bint Ali, one of the 17 daughters of Ali, the fourth caliph of Islam. The spelling Aaliyah with the double 'A' is more common in Arabic transliterations, while the Hebrew version often starts with a single 'A' (Aliyah), though both spellings may be used. Variations of the name, including Alia, Aliya, Aleah, and Alya, can be found across cultures.

== Notable people ==
- Aaliyah Alleyne (born 1994), Caribbean cricketer
- Aaliyah Brown (born 1995), American sprinter
- Aaliyah Chavez (born 2006), American basketball player
- Aaliyah Edwards (born 2002), Canadian basketball player
- Aaliyah Fasavalu-Fa'amausili (born 2000), Australian rugby league footballer
- Aaliyah Haughton or mononymously Aaliyah (1979–2001), American singer/actress
- Aaliyah Nolan (born 1997), Bermudian footballer
- Aaliyah Nye (born 2002), American basketball player
- Aaliyah Palestrini (born 2003), Seychellois swimmer
- Aaliyah Powell (born 2002), British taekwondo practitioner
- Aaliyah Prince (born 2001), Trinidadian footballer
- Aaliyah Wilson (born 1998), American basketball player

== See also ==
- Aliyah (given name)
- Aliyah (Torah)
- Aliyah (disambiguation)
