= Sudići (Čajniče) =

- Village
- Location within Bosnia and Herzegovina
- Coordinates: 43°38′19″N 19°03′42″E
- Country: Bosnia and Herzegovina
- Entity: Republika Srpska
- Municipality: Čajniče
- Time zone: UTC+1 (CET)
  - Summer (DST): UTC+2 (CEST)

Sudići (Cyrillic: Судићи) is a village in the municipality of Čajniče, Bosnia and Herzegovina.

== Notable people ==
- Ahmed Sudi, 16th-century commentator
