= Borajno =

Coordinates: 43°34′53″N 19°04′21″E

- Village
- Location within Bosnia and Herzegovina
- Country: Bosnia and Herzegovina
- Entity: Republika Srpska
- Municipality: Čajniče
- Time zone: UTC+1 (CET)
  - Summer (DST): UTC+2 (CEST)

Borajno (Cyrillic: Борајно) is a village in the municipality of Čajniče, Bosnia and Herzegovina.
