= Trpinje =

- Village
- Location within Bosnia and Herzegovina
- Coordinates: 43°33′N 19°02′E
- Country: Bosnia and Herzegovina
- Entity: Republika Srpska
- Municipality: Čajniče
- Time zone: UTC+1 (CET)
  - Summer (DST): UTC+2 (CEST)

Trpinje (Cyrillic: Трпиње) is a village in the municipality of Čajniče, Bosnia and Herzegovina.
