= Aliyah (disambiguation) =

Aliyah is the immigration of Jews to the Land of Israel.

Aliyah may also refer to:

== Film and television ==
- Aliyah (2012 film), a French film
- Aliyah (2018 film), an Indian Meitei-language film
- "Aliyah" (NCIS), the 25th episode of the sixth season of the CBS network show NCIS

== Other uses ==
- Aliyah (political party), a now-defunct political party in Israel during the 14th Knesset
- Aliyah (given name)
- Aliyah (Torah), being called up to read from, or attend the reading of, a portion of the Torah
- Aliyah (wrestler) (born 1994), a Canadian wrestler

== See also ==
- Aaliyah (1979–2001), American singer, actress and model
- Aaliyah (disambiguation)
- Alijah Vera-Tucker (born 1999), American football player
- Aliya (disambiguation)
- Alia (disambiguation)
- Alya (disambiguation)
