= Kamen (Čajniče) =

- Village
- Location within Bosnia and Herzegovina
- Coordinates: 43°32′45″N 19°13′47″E
- Country: Bosnia and Herzegovina
- Entity: Republika Srpska
- Municipality: Čajniče
- Time zone: UTC+1 (CET)
  - Summer (DST): UTC+2 (CEST)

Kamen (Cyrillic: Камен) is a village in the municipality of Čajniče, Bosnia and Herzegovina.
