= La Nora =

- Locality
- La Nora del Río
- Location within Province of León Location within Castile and León Location within Spain
- Coordinates: 42°9′58″N 5°49′32″W
- Country: Spain
- Autonomous community: Castile and León
- Province: Province of León
- Municipality: Alija del Infantado
- Elevation: 742 m (2,434 ft)

Population
  - Total: 80

La Nora or La Nora del Río is a locality located in the municipality of Alija del Infantado, in the province of León, Castile and León, Spain. As of 2020, it has a population of 80.

== Geography ==
La Nora is located 65km south-southwest of León, Spain.
