= Podavrelo =

- Village
- Location within Bosnia and Herzegovina
- Coordinates: 43°37′N 19°12′E
- Country: Bosnia and Herzegovina
- Entity: Republika Srpska
- Municipality: Čajniče
- Time zone: UTC+1 (CET)
  - Summer (DST): UTC+2 (CEST)

Podavrelo (Cyrillic: Подаврело) is a village in the municipality of Čajniče, Bosnia and Herzegovina.
