= Navianos =

- Locality
- Navianos de la Vega
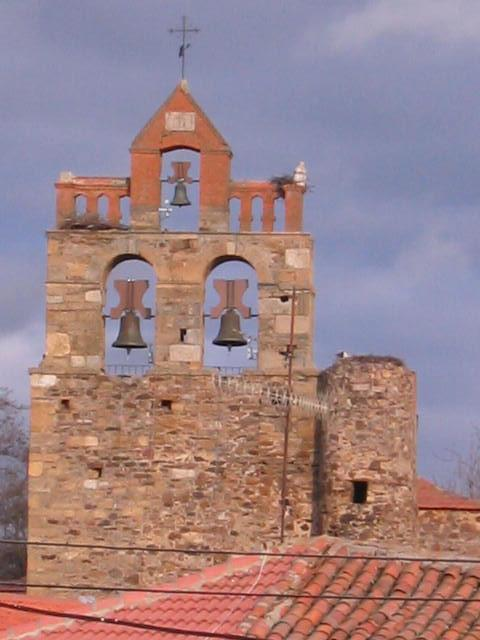

- Location within Province of León Location within Castile and León Location within Spain
- Coordinates: 42°11′13″N 5°49′29″W
- Country: Spain
- Autonomous community: Castile and León
- Province: Province of León
- Municipality: Alija del Infantado
- Elevation: 742 m (2,434 ft)

Population
  - Total: 95

Navianos or Navianos de la Vega is a locality located in the municipality of Alija del Infantado, in the province of León, Castile and León, Spain. As of 2020, it has a population of 95.

== Geography ==
Navianos is located 68km south-southwest of León, Spain.
