= Čajniče =

Town and municipality in Bosnia and Herzegovina

Čajniče Чајниче
- Town and municipality
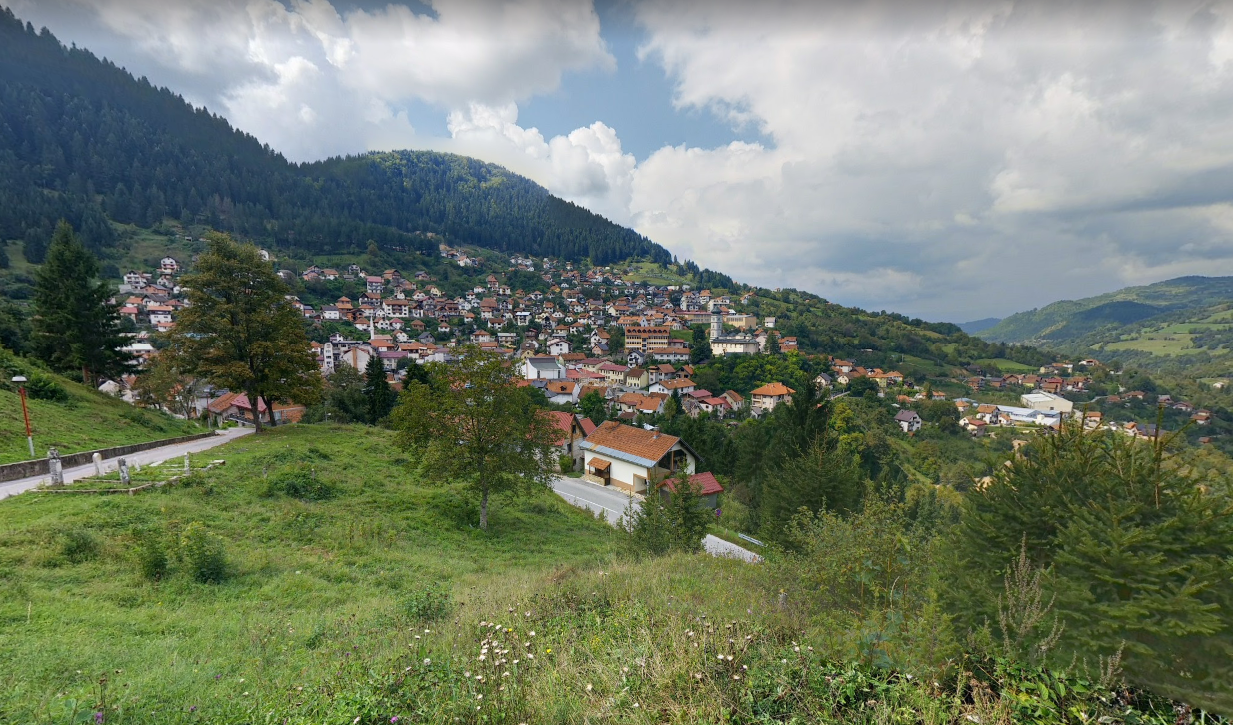
- Čajniče

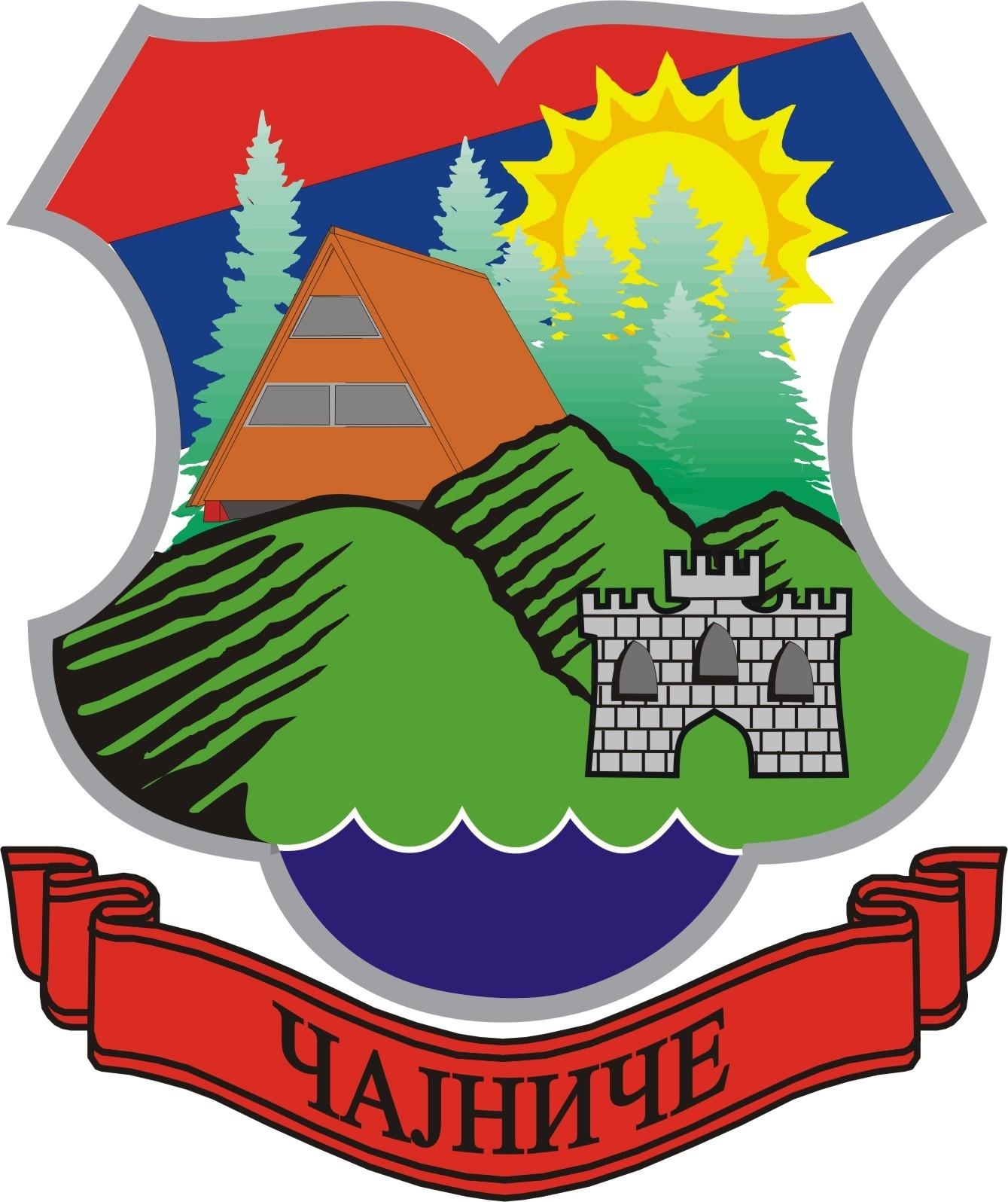
- Coat of arms

- Location of Čajniče within Bosnia and Herzegovina

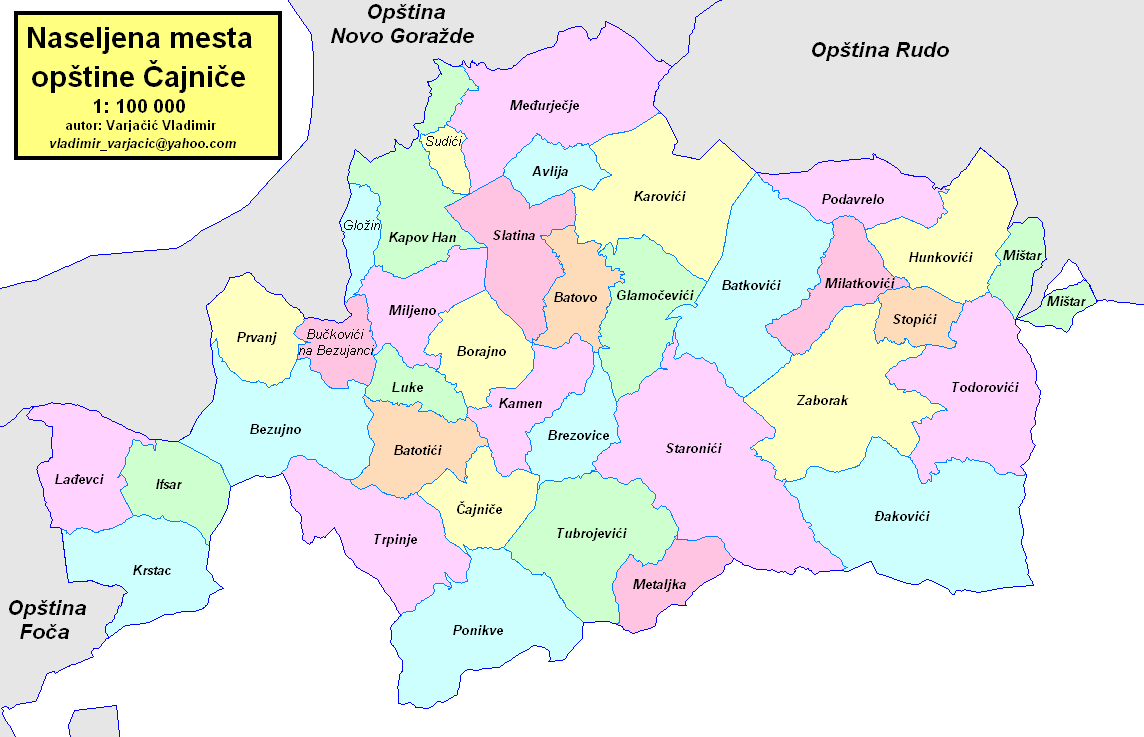
- Coordinates: 43°33′N 19°04′E
- Country: Bosnia and Herzegovina
- Entity: Republika Srpska
- Geographical region: Podrinje

Government
  - Municipal mayor: Miroslav Furtula (SNSD)
  - Municipality: 274.6 km^{2} (106.0 sq mi)

Population (2013 census)
  - Town: 2,401
  - Municipality: 4,895
  - Municipality density: 17.83/km^{2} (46.17/sq mi)
- Time zone: UTC+1 (CET)
  - Summer (DST): UTC+2 (CEST)
- Area code: 58

Čajniče (Serbian Cyrillic: Чајниче, pronounced [tʃâːjniːtʃɛ]) is a town and a municipality in Bosnian entity Republika Srpska, Bosnia and Herzegovina. As of 2013, the town has a population of 2,401 inhabitants, while the municipality has 4,895 inhabitants.

== History ==
When the German and Italian Zones of Influence were revised on 24 June 1942, Čajniče fell in Zone III, administered civilly by Croatia and militarily by Croatia and Germany.

== Settlements ==
Aside from the town of Čajniče, the municipality includes the following settlements:

- Avlija
- Batkovići
- Batotići
- Batovo
- Bezujno
- Borajno
- Brezovice
- Bučkovići na Bezujanci
- Đakovići
- Glamočevići
- Gložin
- Hunkovići
- Ifsar
- Kamen
- Kapov Han
- Karovići
- Krstac
- Lađevci
- Luke
- Međurječje
- Metaljka
- Milatkovići
- Miljeno
- Mištar
- Podavrelo
- Ponikve
- Prvanj
- Slatina
- Staronići
- Stopići
- Sudići
- Todorovići
- Trpinje
- Tubrojevići
- Zaborak

== Demographics ==
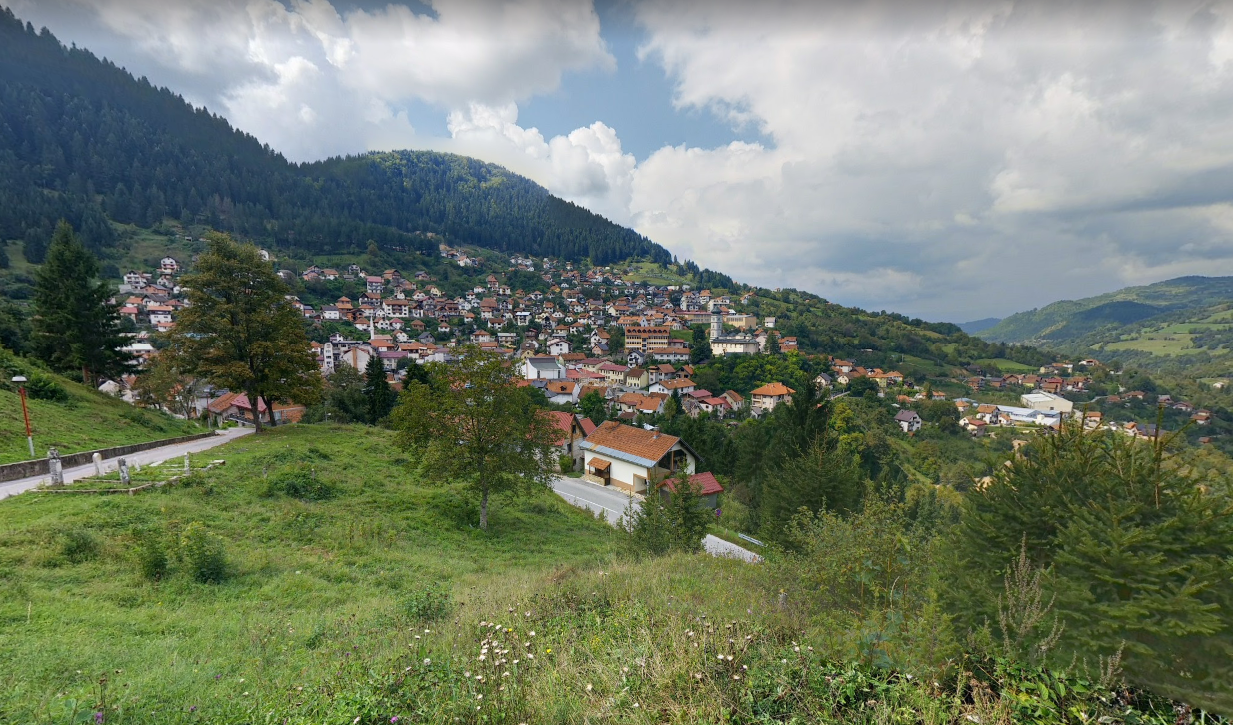
Landscape from Čajniče

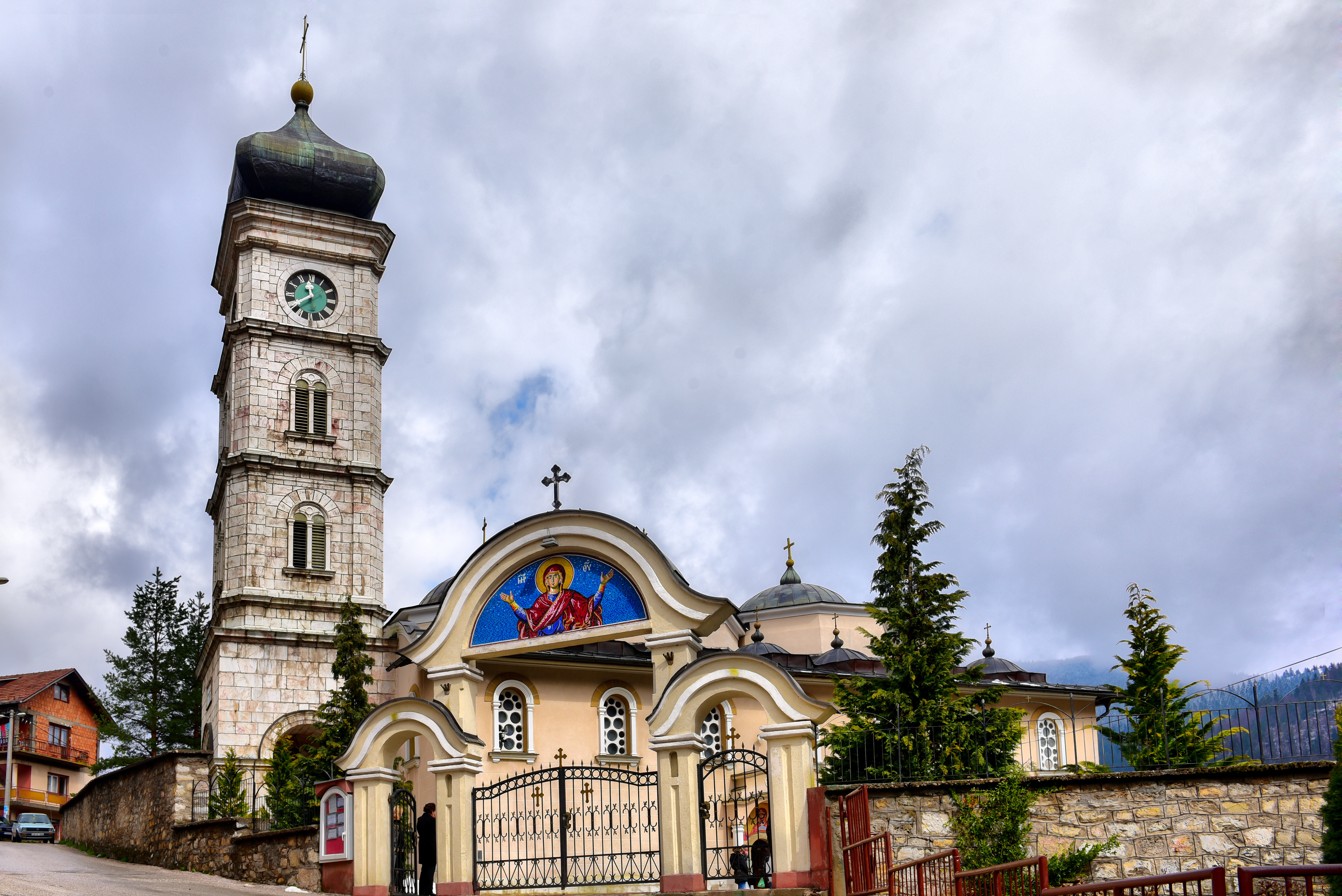
Serbian OrthodoxChurch of the Assumption of the Blessed Virgin Mary

=== Population ===
Population of settlements – Čajniče municipality
	Settlement	1971.	1981.	1991.	2013.
	Total	11,602	10,280	8,956	4,895
1	Batotići			331	283
2	Čajniče	2,015	2,556	3,152	2,401
3	Luke			351	231
4	Miljeno			512	284

=== Ethnic composition ===
Ethnic composition – Čajniče town
	2013.	1991.	1981.	1971.
Total	2,401 (100,0%)	3,152 (100,0%)	2,556 (100,0%)	2,015 (100,0%)
Serbs		1,802 (57,17%)	1,304 (51,02%)	1,051 (52,16%)
Bosniaks		1,192 (37,82%)	931 (36,42%)	857 (42,53%)
Others		105 (3,331%)	29 (1,135%)	5 (0,248%)
Yugoslavs		51 (1,618%)	203 (7,942%)	8 (0,397%)
Croats		2 (0,063%)	6 (0,235%)	19 (0,943%)
Montenegrins			82 (3,208%)	56 (2,779%)
Slovenes			1 (0,039%)	
Albanians				18 (0,893%)
Macedonians				1 (0,050%)

Ethnic composition – Čajniče municipality
	2013.	1991.	1981.	1971.
Total	4,895 (100,0%)	8,956 (100,0%)	10,280 (100,0%)	11,602 (100,0%)
Serbs	3,972 (81,14%)	4,709 (52,58%)	4,892 (47,59%)	5,353 (46,14%)
Bosniaks	884 (18,06%)	4,024 (44,93%)	4,880 (47,47%)	6,065 (52,28%)
Others	33 (0,674%)	141 (1,574%)	44 (0,428%)	22 (0,190%)
Croats	6 (0,123%)	5 (0,056%)	16 (0,156%)	29 (0,250%)
Yugoslavs		77 (0,860%)	311 (3,025%)	14 (0,121%)
Montenegrins			118 (1,148%)	99 (0,853%)
Albanians			18 (0,175%)	18 (0,155%)
Slovenes			1 (0,010%)	1 (0,009%)
Macedonians				1 (0,009%)

== Notable people ==
- Hanka Paldum, Bosnian singer
- Luton & Šćepa, DJs

== See also ==
- Municipalities of Republika Srpska
- Gorazde Ĉajniče sa trotinetomhttps://youtube.com/watch?v=aMHZJka8PMo&si=_iB6SA2uMG1eGJqu

== Bibliography ==
- Trgo, Fabijan, ed. (1964). Zbornik dokumenata i podataka o Narodno-oslobodilačkom ratu Jugoslovenskih naroda. Vol. V, 32.
