= Once Upon a Time in Iraq =

Documentary film about early 21st century Iraq

- Poster
- Genre: Documentary
- Narrated by: Andy Serkis
- Country of origin: United Kingdom
- Original languages: English; Arabic
- No. of series: 1
- No. of episodes: 5

Production
- Executive producers: Will Anderson; Andrew Palmer
- Producer: Jo Abel
- Running time: 296 minutes (BBC); 113 minutes (PBS)
- Production company: KEO Films

Original release
- Network: BBC
- Release: 13 July – 10 August 2020

Once Upon a Time in Iraq is a 2020 English documentary television miniseries directed by James Bluemel and narrated by the English-Iraqi actor Andy Serkis. Composed of five episodes, it features interviews with Iraqi citizens, American military personnel and international journalists about the Iraqi conflict and its effects on the Iraqi people.

== Overview ==
The series chronologically covers the 2003 invasion of Iraq by a United States-led coalition that overthrew the government of Saddam Hussein, and its subsequent occupation of Iraq (2003–2011); the first phase of the Iraqi insurgency (2003–2006); the Iraqi Civil War (2006–2008); the post-US withdrawal insurgency (2011–2013); and the War in Iraq (2013–2017), an armed conflict between the Iraqi Armed Forces and its allies against the Islamic State.

The first episode was broadcast in the United Kingdom on BBC Two on 13 July 2020. A heavily edited, single-episode, feature-length version was subsequently broadcast in the United States by PBS as part of their Frontline series on 14 July 2020. The American version omitted the interviews with Rudy Reyes and Nathan Sassaman among others. The American version also completely omits the third episode on the Battle of Fallujah.

== Interviewees ==
- Mustafa Abed
- Nidhal Abed
- Alaa Adel
- Ahmed Albasheer
- Ahmad al-Matyouti
- Ibrahim al-Rawi
- Christian Dominguez
- Dexter Filkins
- Ashley Gilbertson
- Um Ibrahim
- Ali Hussein Kadhim
- Sally Mars
- Lewis Miller
- Susie Miller
- Omar Mohammed
- Waleed Nesyif
- John Nixon (CIA)
- Rudy Reyes
- Aliyah Khalaf Saleh
- Tahany Saleh
- Nathan Sassaman
- Sam Williams

Note: Several of the above were omitted from the version made for American television.

== Episodes ==
No.	Title	Directed by	Original release date
1	"War"	James Bluemel	July 13, 2020
Varied Iraqi perspectives at the outset of the 2003 Iraq War, contrast the optimism of some young people, who associated invasion with cultural freedom and change, with the caution of others who fear instability despite recognising Saddam Hussein’s repression. Personal accounts from civilians and observers express feelings of hope during the regime’s final days.
2	"Insurgency"	James Bluemel	July 20, 2020
During the early insurgency in Iraq, U.S. military confidence in the mission erodes when faced with continued violence, limited support, and ethical strains, alongside an Iraqi civilian population also impacted by insurgent activity. Various interviews highlight the impact of conflict on both soldiers, reporters, and civilians. In interviews, various subjects question both the grounds and the outcomes of the war.
3	"Fallujah"	James Bluemel	July 27, 2020
The episode recounts the 2004 Battle of Fallujah through the perspectives of embedded journalists, U.S. marines, and Iraqi civilians. It follows reporters documenting intense urban combat while living alongside troops, highlighting the dangers and ethical complexities of war reporting. Accounts from residents illustrate the brutal impact of the fighting on daily life, and the lasting consequences for those caught up in it.
4	"Saddam"	James Bluemel	August 3, 2020
The episode explores Saddam Hussein’s capture and reactions to it, and its aftermath. U.S. officials see the event as a turning point, but there are concerns raised concerns about future instability. Subsequently, underlying sectarian tensions, previously suppressed, contribute to escalating violence and the onset of civil conflict.
5	"Legacy"	James Bluemel	August 10, 2020
After the invasion there is political change, and rising extremism. Sectarian policies contribute to instability and the emergence of ISIS. Those living under ISIS rule experience severe of repression and frequent violence, but there are also acts of resistance and solidarity, the consequences of prolonged conflict and efforts to oppose it.

== Reception ==
The series was widely acclaimed in the British press, winning the awards for best documentary and outstanding series at the Rose d'Or festival in December 2020, in addition to being named Best Factual Series at the 2021 British Academy Television Awards.

The Guardian called Once Upon a Time in Iraq "a gripping, harrowing masterpiece" and praised its content, noting the use of interviews with people who were there, as opposed to prioritising interviews with politicians and analysts. New Statesman called it a "duty" to watch and praising Bluemel's storytelling. However, a review in The New Arab criticised the series as an incomplete representation of the Iraqi experience, and decried the "editorial decision to airbrush British complicity and the participation of British forces in Basra from the story".
