= Ponikve, Čajniče =

Ponikve
- Village
- Location within Bosnia and Herzegovina
- Coordinates: 43°31′31″N 19°04′04″E
- Country: Bosnia and Herzegovina
- Entity: Republika Srpska
- Municipality: Čajniče
- Time zone: UTC+1 (CET)
  - Summer (DST): UTC+2 (CEST)

Ponikve is a village in the municipality of Čajniče, Bosnia and Herzegovina.
