= Đakovići (Čajniče) =

- Village
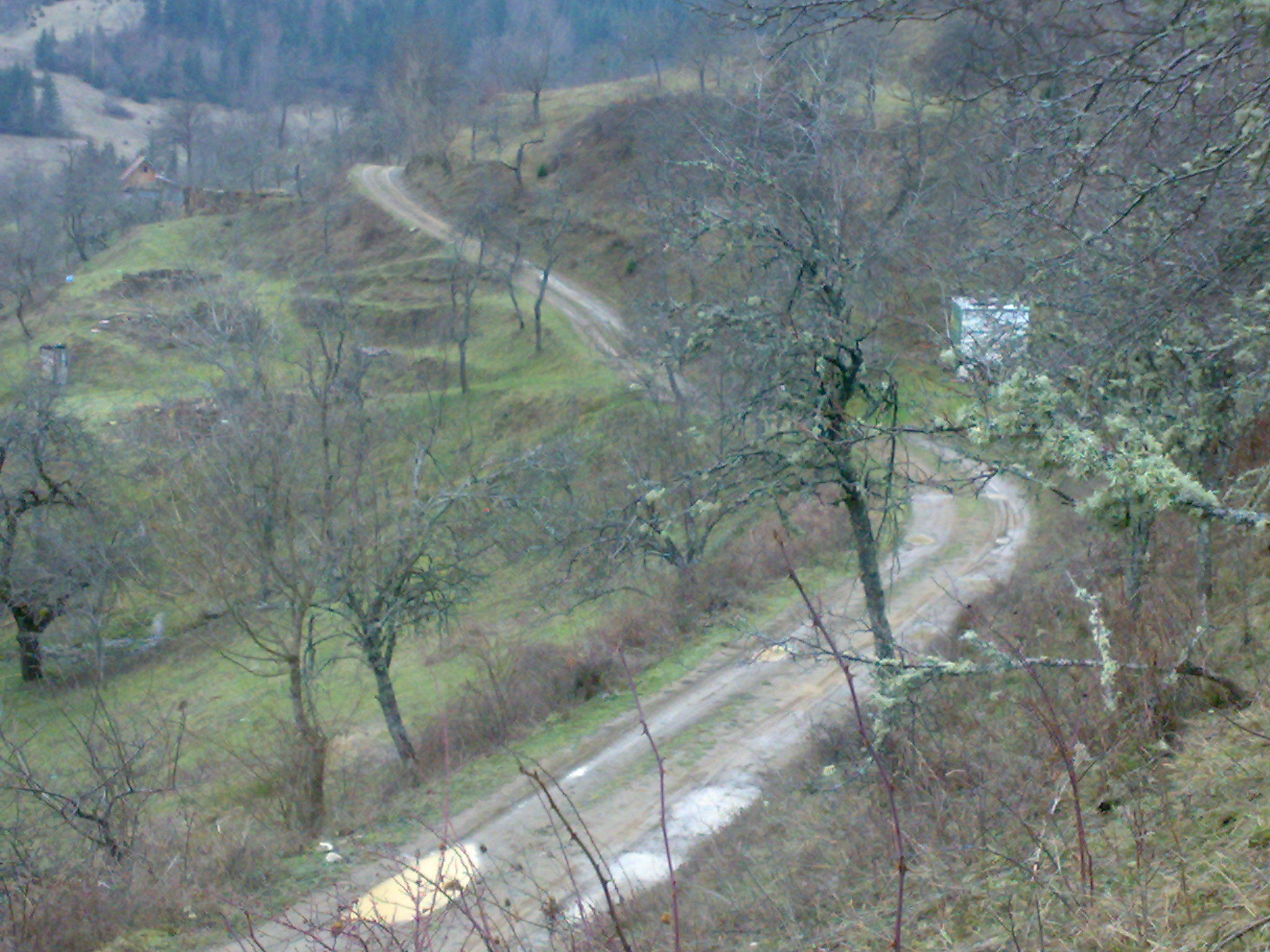

- Location within Bosnia and Herzegovina
- Coordinates: 43°33′15″N 19°12′12″E
- Country: Bosnia and Herzegovina
- Entity: Republika Srpska
- Municipality: Čajniče
- Time zone: UTC+1 (CET)
  - Summer (DST): UTC+2 (CEST)

Đakovići (Cyrillic: Ђаковићи) is a village in the municipality of Čajniče, Bosnia and Herzegovina.
