= Međurječje, Čajniče =

Međurječje Међурјечје
- Village
- Interactive map of Međurječje
- Location within Bosnia and Herzegovina
- Coordinates: 43°39′02″N 19°05′19″E
- Country: Bosnia and Herzegovina
- Entity: Republika Srpska
- Municipality: Čajniče
- Time zone: UTC+1 (CET)
  - Summer (DST): UTC+2 (CEST)

Međurječje (Serbian Cyrillic: Међурјечје) is a village in the southeast municipality of Čajniče, Republika Srpska, Bosnia and Herzegovina.
