= Aliah =

Aliah may refer to:

- Alvah, biblical figure
- Aliah University, Indian institution
- Aliah Raga (born 2004), American gymnast

== See also ==
- Alya (name)
- Alia (name)
- Alaya
