= Prvanj =

- Village
- Location within Bosnia and Herzegovina
- Coordinates: 43°35′53″N 18°59′15″E
- Country: Bosnia and Herzegovina
- Entity: Republika Srpska
- Municipality: Čajniče
- Time zone: UTC+1 (CET)
  - Summer (DST): UTC+2 (CEST)

Prvanj (Cyrillic: Првањ) is a village in the municipality of Čajniče, Bosnia and Herzegovina.
