= Bučkovići na Bezujanci =

- Village
- Location within Bosnia and Herzegovina
- Coordinates: 43°35′27″N 19°01′19″E
- Country: Bosnia and Herzegovina
- Entity: Republika Srpska
- Municipality: Čajniče
- Time zone: UTC+1 (CET)
  - Summer (DST): UTC+2 (CEST)

Bučkovići na Bezujanci (Cyrillic: Бучковићи на Безујанци) is a village in the municipality of Čajniče, Bosnia and Herzegovina.
