= Alya (name) =

Female given name

- Gender: Female

Origin
- Meaning: Heavenly, beautiful

Other names
- See also: Aaliyah, Alia, Aalya

Alya is a female name that originates from Ancient Greek, Slavonic, Hebrew, and Arabic.

In Russia, Alya is typically used as a colloquial name by people named Albina, Alina, Alevtina, Alexandra, or Alla. It is formed in a manner similar to other colloquial Russian names (for example, Kostya for Konstantin, Anya for Anna). Russian citizens of Muslim ethnical minorities also have the name of "Aliya" of probably Arabian descent, which is never used by Russians, and is both a full and a short name.

In Arabic, Alya means sky, heaven, and loftiness.

In Hebrew, Alya means to ascend, to go up.

In Slavonic, Alya is derived from the word алая ("scarlet") in the meaning of "beautiful".

== Notable people with the name ==
- Alya (singer), Slovenian singer
- Alya bint Ahmed Al Thani, Qatari diplomat
- Alya Bakhshal, Pakistani feminist political worker
- Alya Hassan, Emirati volleyball player
- Alya Michelson, Russian singer/songwriter
- Alya Mooro, Egyptian journalist
- Alya Nurshabrina, Indonesian model
- Alya Rohali, Indonesian actress
- Alya Aglan, French historian

== Fictional characters ==
- Alya Césaire, a character in Miraculous: Tales of Ladybug & Cat Noir, the best friend of female protagonist Marinette Dupain-Cheng
- Alya Kendrick, a character in Backstage
- Alisa Mikhailovna Kujō, nicknamed Alya, a character in Alya Sometimes Hides Her Feelings in Russian, the female main character of the series
- Ambassador Alya, a character in the Pixar film, Elio
- Alya, a character in Agents of S.H.I.E.L.D., the daughter of protagonists Leo Fitz and Jemma Simmons.
- Alya Raatko, a character introduced in a DC Comics miniseries, also known as Featherweight

== See also ==
- Aliya, given name
- Aliah
