= Nef'i =

Turkish poet

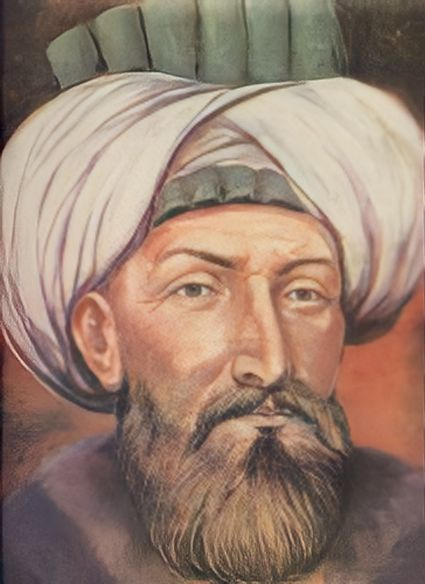
- Born: c.1572 Hasankale, Erzurum,Ottoman Empire
- Died: 1635; Istanbul, Ottoman Empire
- Father: Mehmed Bey

Nefʿī (نفعى) was the pen name (Ottoman Turkish: مخلص maḫlaṣ) of an Ottoman Turk poet and satirist whose real name was ʿOmer (c. 1572, in Hasankale, Erzurum – 1635, in Istanbul).

== Biography ==
He was born around 1572 in Pasinler, Erzurum. His real name was Ömer. He was the grandson of Mirza Ali, the governor of Pasinler, and the son of Mehmed Bey, the governor of Sarıkamış. Nefʿī came to the Ottoman capital of Istanbul sometime before the year 1606, when he is noted to have been working in the bureaucracy as the comptroller of mines (maden mukataacısı). Nef'i attempted to gain the sultan's favor for his poetry, but was unsuccessful with Ahmed I (reigned 1603–1617) and Osman II (reigned 1618–1622). However, finally, Sultan Murad IV (reigned 1623–1640) recognized his skill and granted him a stipend.

Because of his vicious literary attacks on government officials, he was executed by strangulation in 1635 at the request of kaymakam Bayram Pasha.

== Story of his execution ==
Turkish historian and journalist Mahmut Sami Şimşek tells the following story about the execution of Nef'i:

Nef'i's execution was decided due to his satirical verses on Grand Vizier Bayram Pasha.

As Nef'i went to Topkapı Palace to present his newly written satire book "Sihâm-ı Kazâ" (English: Arrows of Misfortune) to Sultan Murad IV, lightning struck the dome of the palace. The sultan ordered him away yelling "You evil! Take your book and get off so that we get rid of the arrows of misfortune".

After leaving the sultan's audience, Nef'i asked the palace master (Ottoman Turkish: Dâr-üs Saâde Ağası) to mediate for his pardoning. The palace master, who was African origin, started to write an application to the grand vizier while Nef'i stood nearby and watched. A short while after, a drop of black ink fell onto the white paper, and Nef'i promptly commented in sarcasm "Sir, your blessed sweat dripped." The palace master tore the paper in anger, and Nef'i was delivered to the executioner. He was courageous until the last moment as he said to his executioner "Go man, you slacker!" After he was strangled with an oiled rope in the woodshed of the palace, his corpse was thrown into the sea.

The following verse became famous describing the event:

Gökten nazîre indi Sihâm-ı Kazâ’sına,
Nef'i diliyle uğradı Hakk’ın belâsına!

Translation:

A recompense came down from the heaven to (Nef'i's) "Arrows of Misfortune", (the name of Nef'i's Divan)
On account of his utterance, Nef'i suffered God's damnation!

The verse is interpreted as both a poetic epitaph and an Abjad chronogram, as its letters, when given their numerical values in the Abjad system, are said to yield the year of Nefʿi's execution, 1044 in the Islamic calendar. While modern scholars acknowledge this symbolic link, the exact numerical derivation is not uniformly documented, and some biographical sources list 1045 AH (1635–1636 CE) as an alternative.

== Works ==
Nef'i was strongly influenced by classical Persian poetry, but also developed the Ottoman Turkish kaside form. In addition to odes, especially about Sultan Murad IV, Nef'i wrote sarcastic and often vitriolic verse about the failings of specific governmental officials.

The verse where he cleverly used an insult he received in a comeback has been very popular. It was a response to

Tahir efendi bana kelp demiş.
İltifatı bu sözde zahirdir;
Maliki mezhebim benim zira,
İtikadımca kelp tahirdir!

Translation:

Mister Tahir has called me a dog I hear.
His compliment is apparent in this statement;
For my sect is Maliki,
According to my creed, the dog is tahir (tahir means clean in Ottoman Turkish).
