= Alia Janine =

American comedian and former pornographic film actress

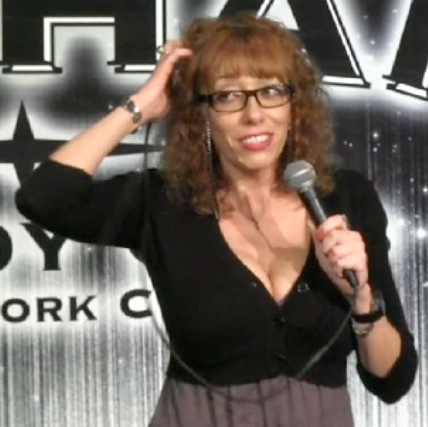
- Janine in 2014
- Born: 1977 or 1978 (age 47–48); Milwaukee, Wisconsin, U.S.
- Occupations: Stand-up comedian; podcaster; pornographic film actress
- Website: aliajanine.com

Alia Janine (born 1977 or 1978) is an American stand-up comedian and former pornographic film actress.

== Pornographic film career ==
Janine was born in Milwaukee, Wisconsin. After high school, she worked as a stripper, security guard, and armored car driver. She entered the pornographic film industry at age 30, and starred in more than 150 films in a span of four years.

As a porn performer, Janine spoke widely about the adult industry's Measure B and testing protocols. She has appeared on Russia TV, as well as multiple blogs, radio shows, podcasts, and video interviews to voice her opinion on Measure B and the testing procedures.

== Mainstream film and television ==
Janine has been featured in music videos, television talk shows, news, and radio shows, as well as cable and feature films. She appeared on Playboy TV's original series Foursome as herself. Janine received a 2015 AVN Award nomination for Mainstream Star of the Year.

== Comedy career ==
Janine began her comedy career in 2010 when she appeared on Sam Tripoli's The Naughty Show and in skits at the Hollywood Improv. After retiring from the adult film industry, Janine moved to New York, took classes at the Manhattan Comedy School, and started a podcast, the Scatterbrains Podcast. Janine has trained at the Comedy Cellar in New York City, and at Gotham Comedy Club through the Manhattan Comedy School. She has also studied improvisational comedy and sketch writing at Upright Citizens Brigade in New York City.

Janine has hosted comedy shows at The Cutting Room in New York City and performed at other New York comedy clubs including The Creek & The Cave, New York Comedy Club, Upright Citizens Brigade, and Gotham Comedy Club. She has hosted touring comedy shows with her company, Hardcore Comedy Entertainment.

In November 2014, Janine announced the launch of a podcast network, The Misfits Podcast Network, hosting a wide variety of podcast shows. She recorded a live episode for the Milwaukee Comedy Festival with the Whormones Podcast.
