= Aliyah Khalaf Saleh =

Iraqi humanitarian

Umm Qusay
- ام قصي
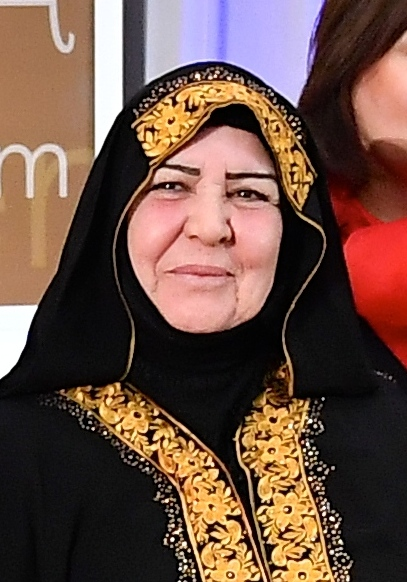
- Umm Qusay in 2018
- Born: Aliyah Khalaf Saleh al-Juburi c. 1956 near Tikrit, Salah al-Din, Kingdom of Iraq
- Known for: Humanitarian efforts during the Islamic State invasion of Iraq
- Awards: Medal of the Nation; International Women of Courage Award

Aliyah Khalaf Saleh al-Juburi (Arabic: عالية خلف صالح الجبوري; born c. 1956), more commonly known as Umm Qusay (Arabic: ام قصي, lit. 'mother of Qusay'), is an Iraqi humanitarian who helped over 50 individuals escape persecution by the Islamic State of Iraq and the Levant in 2014. She is widely regarded as a folk heroine in Iraq.

== Early life ==
Saleh was born in Al Alam, near Tikrit, to a Sunni family of the Jubur tribe in 1956 in what was then the Kingdom of Iraq. She was never formally educated and was married at the age of 13. In the early days of ISIL's occupation of northern Iraq, Saleh's husband and son were killed at a checkpoint while travelling to Mosul.

== Humanitarianism ==
Saleh lived on the banks of the River Tigris, opposite Camp Speicher, an airbase that had formerly been used by the United States Army during the US occupation of Iraq and was by 2014 being used as a training centre for the Iraqi Army. As ISIL approached Tikrit, cadets fled the camp. Many were captured by ISIL, with at least a thousand of them killed in the subsequent Camp Speicher massacre.

Among those fleeing the camp, Saleh was able to rescue over 50 men, including Shia, Kurdish, Yazidi and Christian cadets, many of them fleeing across the river from Camp Speicher. Saleh utilised various methods to hide them from ISIL, including dressing some in women's clothing and hiding them in the women's quarter of her compound. She was also able to obtain identity cards from the University of Tikrit, giving some of the men new identities and teaching them how to say prayers in the Sunni style to avoid sectarian suspicions. Over a five-month period, she smuggled many to safety in the then Kurdish-held city of Kirkuk, often hiding them in trucks surrounded by her female relatives. After Saleh's cover was blown, she and 25 members of her family fled, only returning to Tikrit after ISIL's defeat.

== Recognition ==
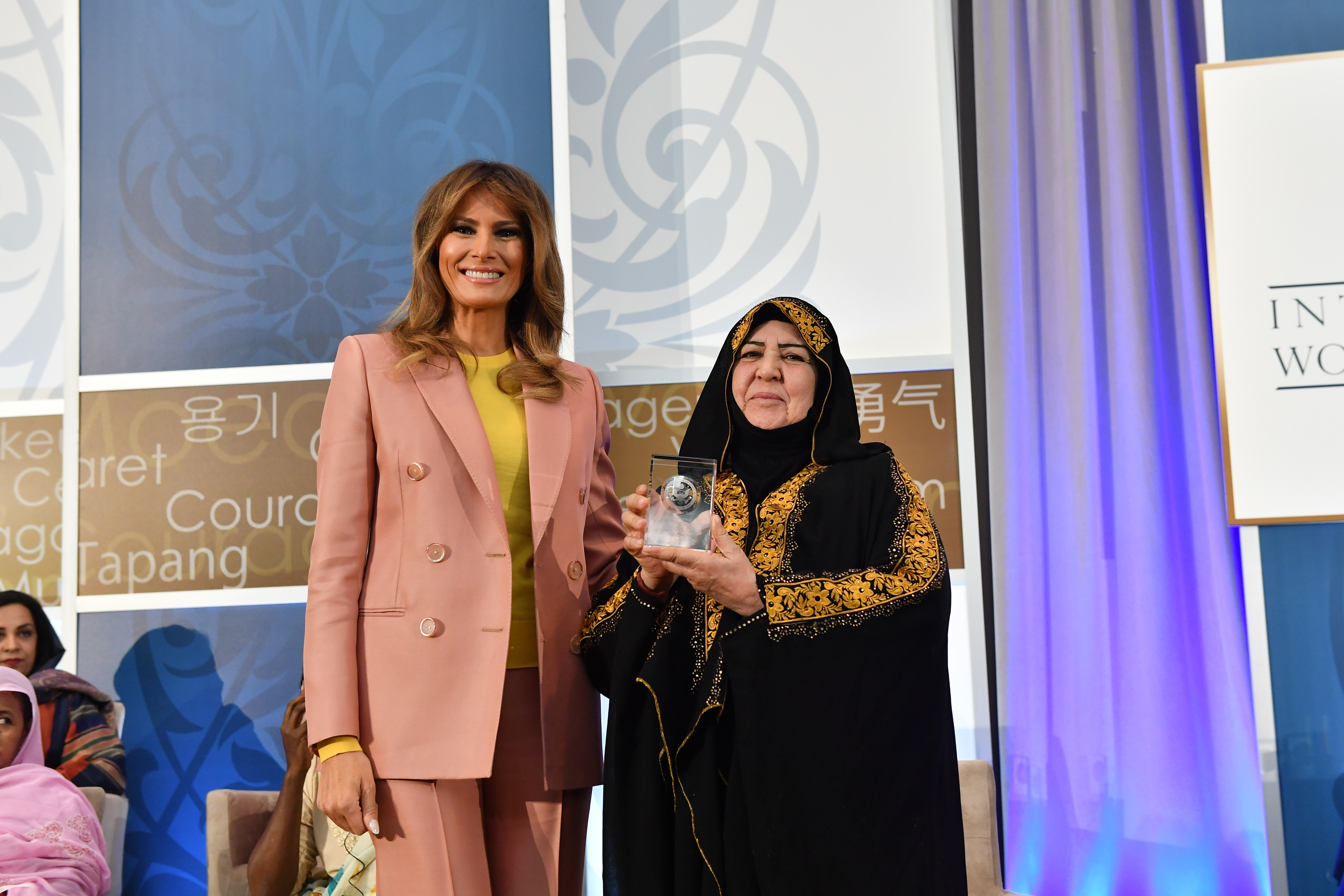
Aliyah Khalaf Saleh receives International Women of Courage Award in 2018.

In July 2015, the Prime Minister of Iraq Haider al-Abadi presented her with Iraq's Medal of the Nation (Arabic: وسام الوطن) in recognition of her actions. She was awarded an International Women of Courage Award in 2018 from the First Lady of the United States, Melania Trump. In 2019, a statue of her likeness was unveiled in Baghdad by the Iraqi minister of culture, Abdul Amir al-Hamdani.

== Media ==
Saleh featured in the 2020 British documentary series Once Upon a Time in Iraq.
