= Aliya LeeKong =

American chef

Aliya Leekong
- Born: February 18, 1978 (age 48)
- Education: Columbia University
- Occupation: Celebrity chef
- Known for: Television Personality
- Website: aliyaleekong.com

Aliya LeeKong is an American chef, television personality and author of the cookbook Exotic Table: Flavors, Inspiration, and Recipes from Around the World – to Your Kitchen.

== Early life ==
Aliya LeeKong was born in New York City and raised in Central Florida. A first generation American, her parents are Indo-Pakistani and Tanzanian immigrants. After graduating from Brown University and Columbia Business School, LeeKong went on to work in New York City, before finding her way to cooking.

== Career ==
LeeKong trained at the International Culinary Center and has traveled to over 30 countries in the past 10 years to study under international home cooks. Countries include Brazil, India, Thailand, Turkey, Chile, South Africa, and Peru. LeeKong initially worked at New York City's Jean Georges, Devi, and Per Se. From March 2011 until January 2014, she served as Chef and Culinary Creative Director of the Indian restaurant Junoon. A television personality, LeeKong has appeared on Food Network’s "Beat Bobby Flay," Chef Marks the Spot, NBC Weekend Today, CBS New York, Men's Health: Guy Gourmet New England Cable News Peggy's Kitchen Cures, What Would Julieanna Do, and Nirmala's Spice World on Veria Living.Leekong was also featured in Kitchen Casino

To make cooking accessible and educational for children, LeeKong established an app called Issa’s Edible Adventures which allows users to digitally travel around the world to learn about food types and culture in different countries. LeeKong was inspired by games she played with her daughter to teach her about multiculturalism.

== Personal life ==
LeeKong lives in New York City with her husband, her two daughters and two dogs. LeeKong is affiliated with Sponsors for Educational Opportunity and The Family Center.

== Publications ==
- Exotic Table: Flavors, Inspiration, and Recipes from Around the World – to Your Kitchen (Adams Media; November, 2013)
