= European Society of Aesthetic Surgery =

European Society for Aesthetic Surgery
- Abbreviation: ESAS
- Type: Non-governmental organization, Teaching organization
- Legal status: Society
- Purpose: Teaching cosmetic surgical techniques
- Location: Cambridge, UK
- Services: Certification, meetings, workshops
- Key people: Dr. Anthony Erian – President; Dr. Toma T. Mugea – General Secretary; Dr.Giorgio Fischer; Dr.Franck Landat; Dr. Angelo Rebelo; Dr. Nikolay P. Serdev; Dr. Alberto di Giuseppe; Dr. Eduardo Krulig; Dr. Zoran Zgaljardic; Dr. Beryl De Souza; Dr. Georges Stergiou; Dr. Mario Rousso
- Website: http://www.eusas.com

The European Society of Aesthetic Surgery (ESAS) is a teaching organization which aims at enhancing the knowledge of cosmetic surgical techniques and concepts. The main aim of the society is to furnish its members with teaching surgical skills. On a yearly basis the society sponsors meetings and workshops. The conference proceedings are published in journals.

== Meetings ==
ESAS sponsors one annual meeting each year to collaborate, share and discuss developments. Past annual meetings were:

- Master Class in Facelift 2, January 27–28, 2007, Cambridge Private Hospital, UK
- 24th International Congress of the French Society of Aesthetic Surgery, May 11–13, 2007, Paris, France
- Rhinoplasty Workshop, Società Italiana di Chirurgia Estetica, May 26, 2007, Rome, Italy
- 1st International European Congress of European Society of Aesthetic Surgery, June 1–3, 2007, Bucharest, Romania
- Varna congress of Beauty Surgery and Antiaging with European Certification Exam, July 1–3, 2007, Varna, Riviera Holiday Club, Bulgaria
- The International Symposium - 20 Years of Aesthetic Surgery and Cosmetology, October 11–13, 2007, Chisinau, Republic of Moldova
- 52nd Meeting and World Congress of the International Academy of Cosmetic Surgery, November 2–3, 2007, Lisbon, Portugal
- International Board of Cosmetic Surgery 2008 Examination, February 28 - March 1, 2008, Taipei, Taiwan
- International Board Certification in Cosmetic Surgery and Meeting and World Congress of the International Academy of Cosmetic Surgery, November 3–4 and 6-8, 2008, Cartagena, Colombia
- 52nd IBCS Meeting and World Congress of the International Academy of Cosmetic Surgery November 5–8, 2008, Cartagena, Colombia
- 25th International Congress of the French Society of Aesthetic Surgery (SFCE) Beautification with Aesthetic Surgery in 2008, May 16–18, 2008, Paris, France
- Live Advanced Courses Breast Augmentation Rebelo's Procedure, October 14–15, 2011, Lisbon, Portugal
- The International Board of Cosmetic Surgery examination, December 2–3 and 7-8, 2011, Saigon, Vietnam
- The International Board of Cosmetic Surgery examination, December 4–5, 2013, Beijing, China
