= Ali Jan, Sanandaj =

Ali Jan آليجان
- Village
- Location within Iran
- Coordinates: 35°30′00″N 46°54′01″E
- Country: Iran
- Province: Kurdistan
- County: Sanandaj
- Bakhsh: Central
- Rural District: Sarab Qamish

Population (2006)
  - Total: 93
- Time zone: UTC+3:30 (IRST)
  - Summer (DST): UTC+4:30 (IRDT)

Ali Jan (Persian: آليجان, also Romanized as ‘Ālī Jān, ‘Ālījān, and ‘Alījān) is a village in Sarab Qamish Rural District, in the Central District of Sanandaj County, Kurdistan Province, Iran. At the 2006 census, its population was 93, in 22 families. The village is populated by Kurds.
