= Alya Mooro =

Egyptian journalist and writer

- Born: Cairo
- Notable works: The Greater Freedom: Life as a Middle Eastern Woman Outside the Stereotypes

Alya Mooro is an Egyptian-born journalist and writer based in London.

== Early life and education ==
Mooro was born in Cairo. She spent her childhood moving back and forth from Cairo to London until her family decided to settle in the UK.

Mooro earned a bachelor's degree in Sociology and Psychology from City University of London. She earned her master's in Journalism from the University of Westminster.

== Career ==
Mooro began her career as a journalist by covering the music industry, particularly the underground hip-hop scene. She dabbled in fashion and eventually began making commentaries on cultural and social issues. Mooro also writes about lifestyle and pop culture. She has guested on radio stations like BBC to discuss the need for increased diversity in media representation.

Mooro is a columnist at Restless magazine. She has written for the New York Magazine, Refinery29, Vice etc.

== Work ==
Mooro authored bestselling memoir and commentary The Greater Freedom: Life as a Middle Eastern Woman Outside the Stereotypes (2019). In the book, Mooro discussed her dual cultural background, to which she was torn to identify herself which. The book also contains accounts of middle eastern women. It explored the stereotypes and social and cultural norms middle eastern women are subjected to — both in the western and middle eastern world — in an attempt to address and destigmatize them. Various forms of gender discrimination are scrutinized, whether through beauty standards or through taboo topics such as relationships, sexuality, religion etc.
