= Alija del Infantado =

- Flag Coat of arms

- Location in the Province of León Location in Castile and León Location in Spain
- Coordinates: 42°8′25″N 5°50′8″W
- Country: Spain
- Autonomous community: Castile and León
- Province: León
- Comarca: Tierra de La Bañeza

Government
  - Mayor: José Antonio Prieto Crespo (UPL)

Area
  - Total: 52.31 km^{2} (20.20 sq mi)
- Elevation: 733 m (2,405 ft)

Population (2025-01-01)
  - Total: 554
  - Density: 10.6/km^{2} (27.4/sq mi)
- Demonyms: alijano, alijana; alixano, alixana; alijense
- Time zone: UTC+1 (CET)
  - Summer (DST): UTC+2 (CEST)
- Postal Code: 24761
- Telephone prefix: 987
- Climate: Csb

Alija del Infantado (Spanish pronunciation: [aˈlixa ðel iɱfanˈtaðo]) is a municipality which is part of Tierra de La Bañeza comarca, autonomous community of Castile and León, Spain.

== Villages ==
- Alija del Infantado
- Bécares
- Navianos
- La Nora
- Ozaniego

== See also ==
- Tierra de La Bañeza
