= Dyomyx =

Scientific classification
- Kingdom: Animalia
- Phylum: Arthropoda
- Class: Insecta
- Order: Lepidoptera
- Superfamily: Noctuoidea
- Family: Erebidae
- Subfamily: Calpinae
- Genus: Dyomyx; Guenée, 1852

Synonyms
- Allia Walker, 1867; Diomxy Hampson, 1926

Genus of moths

Dyomyx is a genus of moths of the family Erebidae. The genus was erected by Achille Guenée in 1852.

== Species ==
- Dyomyx ancea Stoll, 1780
- Dyomyx antigone Möschler, 1880
- Dyomyx cimolia Guenée, 1852
- Dyomyx consequens Dyar
- Dyomyx guenei Bar, 1876
- Dyomyx inferior Herrich-Schäffer, 1869
- Dyomyx juno Möschler, 1890
- Dyomyx leucolepis Hampson, 1926
- Dyomyx lineata H. Druce, 1889
- Dyomyx jonesi Schaus, 1898
- Dyomyx megalops Guenée, 1852
- Dyomyx obliquata Schaus, 1911
- Dyomyx ocellata Walker, 1867
- Dyomyx ora Dyar, 1914
- Dyomyx placida Schaus, 1901
- Dyomyx psectrocera Hampson, 1924
- Dyomyx unicolora Hampson, 1926
- Dyomyx volcanica Schaus, 1898
- Dyomyx zates H. Druce, 1898
