= Medojević =

Medojević is a surname. Notable people with the surname include:

- Nebojša Medojević (born 1966), Montenegrin politician
- Slobodan Medojević (born 1990), Serbian footballer
