= Aliyah (given name) =

Aliyah (Hebrew: עליה; Arabic: علية or عالية) is a female given name with origins in Hebrew and Arabic.

== Origin and meanings ==
In Hebrew, aliyah means "ascent," "rising," or "going up." It is found in various parts of the Tanakh to refer to this concept. The word is often used to refer to the calling of a member of a Jewish congregation up to the bimah for a segment of the formal Torah reading. It may also refer to the immigration of Jews from the diaspora to the geographical Land of Israel (i.e. "making aliyah").

In Arabic, aliyah (more commonly transliterated as aaliyah) is derived from the verb “alah,” which means “to ascend” or “to go up.” As a given name, it is the feminine form of Aali, meaning “high” or “exalted.” Aaliyah is also associated with Aliya bint Ali, one of the 17 daughters of Ali, the fourth caliph of Islam. Variations of the name, including Alia, Aliya, Aleah, and Alya, can be found across cultures.

- Aliyah Abrams (born 1997), Guyanese sprinter
- Aliyah Bah (born 2003), American influencer known professionally as Aliyah's Interlude
- Aliyah Boston (born 2001), American basketball player
- Aliyah Collier (born 1997), American basketball player
- Aliyah O'Brien (born 1981), Canadian actress
- Aliyah Saleem (born 1989), British secular education campaigner
- Aliyah Khalaf Saleh (born c. 1956), Iraqi humanitarian

== Variants ==
Variant versions of Aliyah include the Turkish Aliye and the Tatar Ğaliyə (Галия).

== See also ==
- Aaliyah (given name)
- Aliyah (Torah)
- Aliyah (disambiguation)
