= Alijan, Divandarreh =

Alijan آليجان
- Village
- Location within Iran
- Coordinates: 35°55′17″N 46°40′58″E
- Country: Iran
- Province: Kurdistan
- County: Divandarreh
- Bakhsh: Central
- Rural District: Chehel Cheshmeh

Population (2006)
  - Total: 184
- Time zone: UTC+3:30 (IRST)
  - Summer (DST): UTC+4:30 (IRDT)

Alijan (Persian: آليجان, also Romanized as Ālījān and ‘Alījān) is a village in Chehel Cheshmeh Rural District, in the Central District of Divandarreh County, Kurdistan Province, Iran. At the 2006 census, its population was 184, in 38 families. The village is populated by Kurds.
