= Alia (Phrygia) =

Ancient city in Phrygia

Alia was a town of ancient Phrygia, inhabited in Roman and Byzantine times. It was located in the Roman province of Phrygia Pacatiana, whose capital was Laodicea on the Lycus, and became the seat of a bishop. The names of some of the bishops of Alia are known through their participation in church councils: Caius at the Council of Chalcedon (451), Glaucus at the Second Council of Constantinople (553), Leo at the Second Council of Nicaea (787), and Michael and Georgius, the one a supporter of Patriarch Ignatius of Constantinople, the other a supporter of Photius, at the Council of Constantinople (879).

No longer a residential bishopric, Alia is today listed by the Catholic Church as a titular see.

Some authorities locate the town at Islamköy, now known as Banaz; others identify a place near Asar, both of which are in Asiatic Turkey.
