= Mosleh al-Din Lari =

16th-century Persian scholar

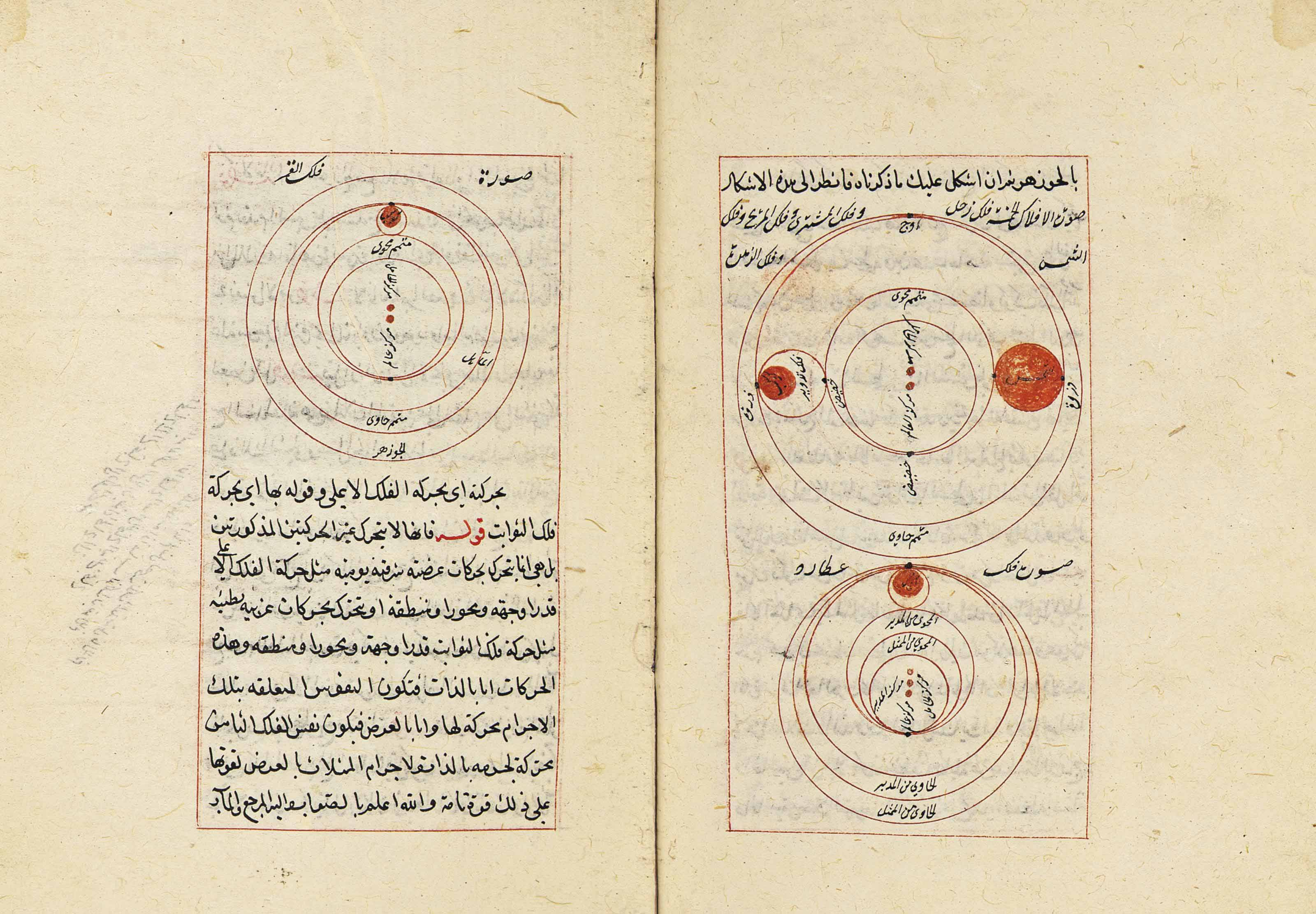
- Manuscript of one of Mosleh al-Din Lari's works on astronomy. Copy created in Constantinople, dated 27 January 1608
- Born: c. 1510; Lar, Fars, Safavid Iran
- Died: April–May 1572; Amid, Diyarbekir Eyalet, Ottoman Empire
- Occupations: Scholar, historian
- Notable work: Mer'ât-al-advâr va merqât-al-akhbâr

Mosleh al-Din Lari (also spelled Muslih; c. 1510 – April–May 1572), was a Persian scholar and historian. A native of Lar, Lari was a Sunnite born in early 16th-century Safavid Iran. As a result of Safavid persecution of Sunnis, he sought refuge at the Mughal court where he was received with respect by Emperor Humayun, who also became Lari's student. Following his patron's death, he moved to the Ottoman Empire, where he was offered a prestigious professorship in the Ottoman capital of Constantinople (present-day Istanbul). Lari declined the offer, which resulted in a break of relations with the Ottoman Shaykh al-Islām, Ebussuud Effendi. He then settled down in Amed (present-day Diyarbakır), where he was appointed professor of the Hüsrev Pasha madrasa by the local Ottoman governor, and became tutor to the governor's children. An author of numerous annotations and commentaries, Lari's best-known work is the Mer'ât-al-advâr va merqât-al-akhbâr, a universal history written in Persian which he dedicated to Ottoman Sultan Selim II upon his accession to the throne.

== Biography ==
Lari was born in c. 1510 in Lar to the south of Shiraz, the capital of Fars province, in southern Iran. He hailed from a learned family and thus, following tradition, embarked upon a scholarly career. He entered studies under Ghyath al-Din Mansur Dashtaki and Mir Kamal al-Din Hosayn Lari. Lari's father reportedly presented himself openly as anti-Shia. As a result of the initiated campaign to convert Iran to Shia Islam by then ruling Shah ("King") Ismail I (r. 1501–1524), adherents of Sunni Islam were persecuted. This prompted Lari, at some point, to seek refuge in the Mughal Empire. There, he was received with respect by Mughal Emperor Humayun (r. 1530-1556), and was given the honorary title of ustad, with Humayun becoming his student.

Following the unrest that erupted after his patron's death in 1555, Lari departed from Mughal India. He first went on Hajj to Mecca. He reportedly lost four hundred of his books underway at a shipwreck. After fulfilling his pilgrimage, he stayed from 1556/7 onwards in Aleppo in Ottoman Syria where he seemingly attempted to set himself up as a merchant. Lari's knowledge stood out in discussions with the learned men of Aleppo, which included Ahmad Qazvini, who refrained from answering to Lari's objections against his It̲h̲bāt al-wād̲j̲ib which he had recently written. Lari's length of stay in Aleppo is unspecified, but he likely lacked a livelihood. At some point he moved to the Ottoman capital of Constantinople (now Istanbul, Turkey), where he acquired access to the Shaykh al-Islām, Ebussuud Efendi (Abu 'l-Suʿud). Ebussuud secured Lari a professorship with a salary of 50 akçes a day; Lari however declined the offer. According to the professor of Islamic studies Hanna Sohrweide, he may have deemed the position as a rather unimportant compared to the earlier situation he found himself in at the Mughal court of Humayun. As a result, Ebussuud Efendi fell out with Lari.

Lari, dishearted after falling out with Ebussuud, left Constantinople before eventually settling down in Amed (present-day Diyarbakır), where the Ottoman governor Iskender Pasha appointed him as professor at the Hüsrev Pasha madrasa as well as the tutor of his children. At some later point Lari was accepted among the mewali-yi Rûm, and was acknowledged by the Sublime Porte. He was appointed as mufti of Diyarbakir shortly before his death. Lari died having passed the age of 60, in April–May 1572.

== Beliefs ==
At first, Lari was an adherent of the Shafiʽi maddhab. He later became a Hanafi. During his life, he also somewhat leaned towards mysticism.

== Works ==
Lari was the author of numerous annotations and commentaries on renowned philosophical and astronomical works, as well as well-known works on tafsir and hadith. He also attempted to become a poet; this experiment however did not succeed. His Mer'ât-al-advâr va merqât-al-akhbâr however, an abridged universal history written in Persian prose, became famous. He dedicated it to Ottoman Sultan Selim II (r. 1566–1574) on the occasion of him being crowned. The work consists of ten chapters (bâbs), an introduction (moqademme), and is a collection from 50 works written mainly in Arabic and Persian but also a few in Turkish. Among the Persian works are the Târikh-e Hâfez-e Abru and the Rawżat aṣ-ṣafāʾ. The used works are mentioned in the preface of Lari's work. A short summary of the content of each book of Lari's Mer'ât-al-advâr va merqât-al-akhbâr (per to the modern historian Sara Nur Yıldız):

- Book 1-4: Prophets of the Old Testament to the early Iranian kings contemporary with them, before ending with the Sasanian and Arab rulers
- Book 5: Introduction of the Islamic epic with an account of the Islamic prophet Mohammad, the early Arab Caliphs, the Umayyads and the Abbasids
- Book 6: The Iranian dynasties contemporaneous to the Abbasids, concluding with the Ismailis
- Book 7: Genghis Khan, his successors (including the Chobanids, Qara Khitais and Muzaffarids)
- Book 8: Timur and his successors
- Book 9: Aq Qoyunlu, as well as a brief mention of the Safavid Shahs Ismail I and his son and successor Tahmasp I (r. 1524–1576). The final part of the book laments how the "great scholars of Iran had been driven out of the realm by his fanaticism"
- Book 10: Short synopsis of the Ottomans, up until the reign of Sultan Suleiman the Magnificent (r. 1520–1566) and the start of the Hungarian War of 1526

The very end of the work also includes a biographical section on statesmen, scholars and poets.

Lari's Mer'ât-al-advâr va merqât-al-akhbâr "was little copied in its time" according to Yıldız. However at some point, possibly between 1566/7 and 1570, Hoca Sadeddin Efendi (Khoja Sa'd al-Din Efendi) was ordered by then Ottoman Grand Vizier Sokollu Mehmed Pasha to write an adaptation of the first nine chapters of Lari's work in Ottoman Turkish. Hoca Sadeddin's omitted Lari's tenth chapter, which dealt with the Ottomans, as they were the subject of Hoca Sadeddin's own Tâcü’t-tevârikh. Hoca Sadeddin translation of Lari's original was dedicated to Sultan Murad III in 1575. The official Ottoman historiographer (waḳʿa-nüwīs), Es'ad Efendi, also translated Lari's work partially in the 19th century.

== Sources ==
- Sohrweide, H. (1986). "al-Lārī". In Bosworth, C. E.; van Donzel, E.; Lewis, B. & Pellat, Ch. (eds.). The Encyclopaedia of Islam, Second Edition. Volume V: Khe–Mahi. Leiden: E. J. Brill. ISBN 978-90-04-07819-2.
- Yıldız, Sara Nur (2012). "Ottoman Historical Writing in Persian, 1400-1600". In Melville, Charles (ed.). Persian Historiography: A History of Persian Literature Vol. X. I.B. Tauris. ISBN 978-0857736574.
