= Nikolay P. Serdev =

Bulgarian plastic surgeon

Nikolay P. Serdev (born April 26, 1948) is a Bulgarian board certified specialist in General Surgery and Cosmetic Surgery. He is both Professor and Director of the International University Program in Cosmetic Surgery at New Bulgarian University.

== Education ==
Serdev is a graduate of the Sofia Medical University, and trained in General and then Cosmetic Aesthetic Surgery at the Military Medical Academy, and Aesthetic Surgery, Aesthetic Medicine Medical Center in Sofia, 1991-1996 he was a deputy head and acting head of the Burns Department in the Military Medical Academy and 2006-2008 National consultant in Cosmetic (Aesthetic) Surgery medical specialty at the Ministry of Health, Bulgaria.

== Career ==
In the early 90s Serdev was the author of a proposed "scarless" closed lifting methods without incisions, in Brazil known as fio elastico. "Beleza questao de atitude" by Mari Fio Bulgaro Fios de Sustentação Guia da plastica Paraenses já podem usar técnica de origem búlgara que tem revolucionado os tratamentos estéticos Tensor / Fio Búlgaro

== Professional recognition ==
- Since 1993 President, National Bulgarian Society of Aesthetic Surgery and Aesthetic Medicine.
- 2006-2008 National consultant in Cosmetic Aesthetic Surgery.
- Since 2002 Director of the Board International Academy of Cosmetic Surgery.
- Since 2003 Trustee, Board member International Board of Cosmetic Surgery
- 2006 Honorary Professor, New Bulgarian University, Bulgaria and Program Director, International University Program in Cosmetic Surgery.

== Selected publications ==
- Serdev N, Tomalov I, Milkov I, Genov G, Kirilova M (1986). "[Our treatment experience of stress ulcers in 242 patients]". Khirurgiia (in Bulgarian). 39 (2): 18–23. PMID 3735985.
- Serdev N, Topalov I, Milkov I, Makaveeva E, Boiadzhieva I (1988). "[Possibilities of identifying patients at risk for stress ulcer]". Khirurgiia (in Bulgarian). 41 (3): 11–7. PMID 3172657.
- Serdev N (1989). "[Surgical treatment of stress ulcer]". Khirurgiia (in Bulgarian). 42 (4): 5–9. PMID 2585983.
- Serdev N (1990). "[The surgical treatment of hemorrhoids. Their suturing ligation without excision]". Khirurgiia (in Bulgarian). 43 (4): 65–8. PMID 2097429.
- Serdev N (1991). "[Free dermatoplasty in traumatic amputations of the fingers]". Khirurgiia (in Bulgarian). 44 (2): 37–43. PMID 1895687.
- Yonov Y, Petkov P, Serdev N (September 1998). "Criteria for Patients at Risk in Relation to Multiorganic Deficiency due to Burn Injuries". Annals of Burns and Fire Disasters. 11 (3).
- US patent 5980888, Dimoudis, Nikolaos; Hartinger, Anton, "Keratinocytes attached to microcarriers for treatment of skin wounds", issued 9 November 1999
- Serdev, Nikolay P. (2001). "Ambulatory Temporal SMAS Lift by Minimal Hidden Incisions". International Journal of Cosmetic Surgery. 1 (2): 20–7.
- Serdev, Nikolay P. (2001). "A Suture Method for Scarless Brow Lift". International Journal of Cosmetic Surgery. 1 (4): 85–99.
- Serdev, Nikolay P. (2002). "Serdev Suture Method for Ambulatory Medial SMAS Face Lift". International Journal of Cosmetic Surgery. 2 (4): 1550–62.
- Serdev, Nikolay P. (December 2002). "Estiramiento ambulatorio del SMAS en la zona temporal con incisiones mínimas y ocultas" (PDF). International Journal of Cosmetic Surgery (in Spanish). 4 (3): 1–6.
- Serdev, Nikolay P. (2002). "Total Ambulatory SMAS Lift by Hidden Minimal Incisions Part 2: Lower SMAS-Platysma Face Lift". International Journal of Cosmetic Surgery and Aesthetic Dermatology. 4 (4): 285. doi:10.1089/153082002763471948.
- Serdev, Nikolay P. (2002). "Total Ambulatory SMAS Lift by Hidden Minimal Incisions Part 1: Temporal SMAS Lift". International Journal of Cosmetic Surgery and Aesthetic Dermatology. 4 (3): 179. doi:10.1089/153082002762205070.
- Serdev, Nikolay P. (2003). "Leg form elongation and beautification using ultrasonic liposculpture". International Journal of Cosmetic Surgery. 3 (3): 329–404.
- Serdev, Nikolay P. (2003). "Fresh Keratinocytes Adhered on Collagen Microcarriers for Definitive Closure of Atonic Chronic Wounds". International Journal of Cosmetic Surgery and Aesthetic Dermatology. 5: 27. doi:10.1089/153082003767787169.
- Serdev, Nikolay P. (2006). "Beautification Rhinoplasty". International Journal of Cosmetic Surgery. 6 (1): 355–407.
- Serdev, Nikolay (2008). "Serdev Techniques in Beautification Rhinoplasty". International Journal of Cosmetic Surgery. 8 (1): 388–469.
