= Karovići (Čajniče) =

- Village
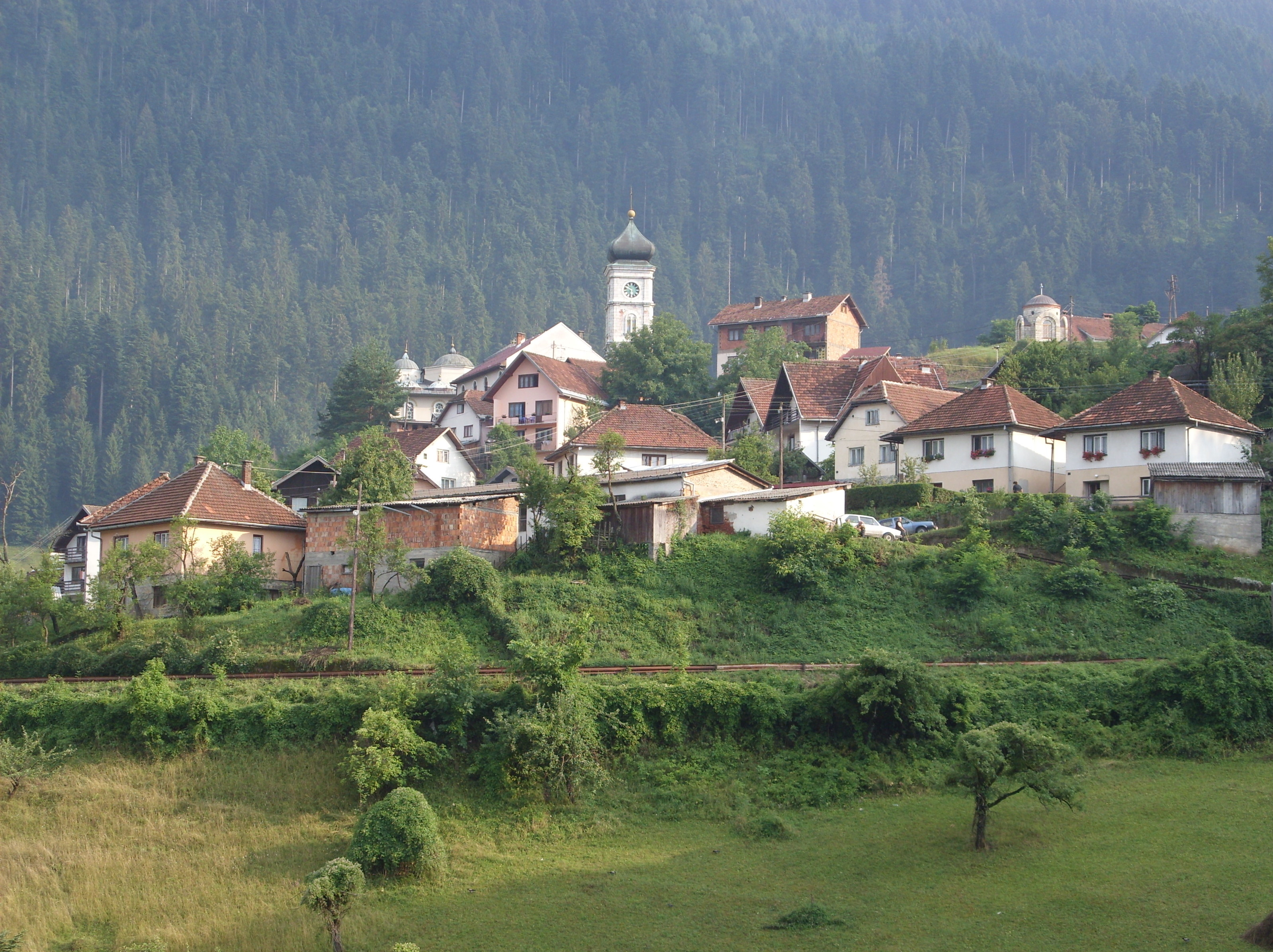
- Interactive map of Karovići
- Coordinates: 43°37′39″N 19°06′59″E
- Country: Bosnia and Herzegovina
- Entity: Republika Srpska
- Municipality: Čajniče
- Time zone: UTC+1 (CET)
  - Summer (DST): UTC+2 (CEST)

Karovići (Cyrillic: Каровићи) is a village in the municipality of Čajniče, Bosnia and Herzegovina.
