= Avlija =

- Village
- Location within Bosnia and Herzegovina
- Coordinates: 43°37′52″N 19°05′56″E
- Country: Bosnia and Herzegovina
- Entity: Republika Srpska
- Municipality: Čajniče
- Time zone: UTC+1 (CET)
  - Summer (DST): UTC+2 (CEST)

Avlija (Cyrillic: Авлија) is a village in the municipality of Čajniče, Bosnia and Herzegovina.
