= Alia Humaid Al Qassimi =

Emirati surgeon

Sheikha Dr. Alia Humaid Al Qassimi
- Education: Royal College of Surgeons in Ireland
- Occupation: Medical practitioner
- Medical career
- Profession: Surgeon
- Sub-specialties: Gynaecology, plastic and reconstructive surgery
- Awards: Inspirational Woman of the Year 2016 at the Arab Woman Awards; Woman Leader Award for Community Development Excellence at the 19th Global Women's Leaders Conference

Sheikha Alia Humaid Al Qassimi is an Emirati surgeon with a specialism in gynaecology, plastic and reconstructive surgery. She was the first Emirati to become a senior member of the European Society of Aesthetic Surgery, and has since sat on its scientific committee. Qassimi has worked internationally to bring developments in her field to the United Arab Emirates, and was named Inspirational Woman of the Year at the Arab Woman Awards in 2016.

== Career ==
As a child, Alia Humaid Al Qassimi suffered from asthma, and was inspired by her doctors to pursue a career in as a medical professional. She pursued a specialism in gynaecology, becoming the first Emirati surgeon to gain senior membership in the European Society of Aesthetic Surgery. She said that part of her role was the travel in Europe to learn new techniques, and then bring them back to the United Arab Emirates to teach others there. As part of this overseas collaborative work, she attended the Royal College of Surgeons in Ireland at its Dubai campus, graduating in 2008 with a Master's degree in Healthcare Management. Qassimi was also part of the Women Leadership Exchange Programme, an effort between the UAE government and Lund University in Sweden to share knowledge, which she graduated in 2013.

Qassimi sits on the board of the non-government organisation, Women for Sustainable Growth, which seeks to expand the sharing of knowledge between the Middle East and Scandinavia for the benefit of women. She is employed as the chief executive of the Social Care and Development sector of the Dubai Government, and leads two taskforces in the Dubai disability strategy for 2020 as part of her role as a subject matter expert for the Community Development Authority. In 2017, she was appointed to the scientific committee for the European Society of Aesthetic Surgery's world conference in Madrid, Spain.

=== Awards ===
In 2016, she was named the Inspirational Woman of the Year at the Arab Woman Awards. She said that the awards would inspire her to further her work, adding "The UAE provided us with help and support and that increases our determination to be its ambassadors and inspire generations in the future." The following year, she won the Woman Leader Award at the Global Women's Leaders Conference in the Community Development Excellence category, on the 19th occasion of the conference as it was held in Dubai.

== Personal life ==
Qassimi is married and has five children.
