= Kapov Han =

Coordinates: 43°38′01″N 19°02′55″E

- Village
- Location within Bosnia and Herzegovina
- Country: Bosnia and Herzegovina
- Entity: Republika Srpska
- Municipality: Čajniče
- Time zone: UTC+1 (CET)
  - Summer (DST): UTC+2 (CEST)

Kapov Han (Cyrillic: Капов Хан) is a village in the municipality of Čajniče, Bosnia and Herzegovina.
