= Bezujno =

- Village
- Location within Bosnia and Herzegovina
- Coordinates: 43°34′30″N 19°00′09″E
- Country: Bosnia and Herzegovina
- Entity: Republika Srpska
- Municipality: Čajniče

Population (1991)
  - Total: 138
- Time zone: UTC+1 (CET)
  - Summer (DST): UTC+2 (CEST)

Bezujno (Serbian Cyrillic: Безујно) is a village in the municipality of Čajniče, in the Republika Srpska entity of Bosnia and Herzegovina. It is located near the border with Montenegro.

== History ==
Bezujno was once a municipality (opština) during Yugoslavia.

According to the 1991 census, the village had a total of 138 inhabitants, out of whom 107 were Serbs, 30 Muslims, and 1 Croat.

The former settlement of Medoševići was annexed into Bezujno by 1995.
