= Alia Sabur =

American materials scientist, attorney, and patent examiner

- Born: February 22, 1989 (age 37); New York City, New York, U.S.
- Education: Stony Brook University (B.S.); Drexel University (M.S.; Ph.D. reported); George Washington University Law School (law degree/J.D. reported)
- Known for: Guinness World Record for youngest university professor
- Awards: Guinness World Record for youngest professor
- Scientific career
- Fields: Materials science
- Workplaces: Konkuk University; United States Patent and Trademark Office

Alia Sabur (born February 22, 1989) is an American materials scientist, attorney, and patent examiner. From 2008 to 2026, she was listed by Guinness World Records as the world's youngest university professor, after an appointment at Konkuk University took effect on February 19, 2008, when she was 18 years and 362 days old.

== Early life and education ==
Sabur was born in New York City, New York, to Julie Sabur, who worked as a reporter for News 12 Long Island until 1995, and Mohammed Sabur, a Pakistan native. She showed early signs of intellectual giftedness; according to later press accounts, she learned to read as an infant and tested "off the IQ scale" as a young child.

As a fourth-grader, Sabur left public school and entered Stony Brook University at the age of 10. She graduated summa cum laude with a Bachelor of Science degree in applied mathematics in 2003, at age 14. She was also a clarinet player and earned a black belt in taekwondo at age nine.

After Stony Brook, Sabur attended Drexel University, where she received a master's degree in materials science and engineering. Drexel listed her among the recipients of the university's 2007 Dean's Fellowship. Published accounts differ about the status of her Drexel doctorate. Guinness World Records states that Sabur was awarded a Ph.D. in engineering from Drexel in June 2007. However, the Korea JoongAng Daily reported in April 2008 that, according to Sabur's personal website, she had completed all doctoral requirements except the dissertation, and Reuters reported in June 2008 that she was still finishing a Ph.D. in materials science and engineering. A 2015 profile in The Irish Times described the path to her doctorate as having been obstructed by her later dispute with Drexel.

Sabur later studied law. In 2010, Bidoun reported that she was in her first year of law school at Georgetown University, seeking to work on legal protections for graduate students' research. In 2013, The Stony Brook Press reported that Sabur had completed her Juris Doctor degree at George Washington University Law School and was working for the United States Patent and Trademark Office as a patent examiner.

== Lawsuits and doctoral-degree status ==
A lawsuit involving Sabur's education was brought by her parents against the Northport-East Northport school district and related defendants. The case alleged failures to provide appropriate educational services under the Individuals with Disabilities Education Act; most of the claims were dismissed by the United States District Court for the Eastern District of New York in 2002.

Sabur's graduate studies at Drexel later became the subject of a civil dispute. According to The Irish Times, Sabur said she sued the university after believing that her Ph.D. adviser was taking credit for her research ideas and using them for grant and patent applications. The adviser denied the allegations and accused her of stealing his work. The case went into private arbitration, and the outcome was confidential; Sabur told The Irish Times that she had been cleared of the accusations against her.. Guinness lists her as having received a Ph.D. from Drexel in June 2007, while other contemporary and later reports described her doctorate as unfinished or obstructed.

== Academic career ==
In 2007, Sabur took a temporary teaching position at Southern University at New Orleans, which was then still recovering from Hurricane Katrina.

On February 19, 2008, three days before her 19th birthday, Sabur was appointed to a full-time faculty post in the Department of Advanced Technology Fusion at Konkuk University in Seoul, South Korea. Her official title, according to Guinness World Records, was "International Professor as Research Liaison with Stony Brook University". Reuters reported that her research at Konkuk involved nanoparticle-functionalized nanomaterials for chemical identification using Raman spectroscopy.

The Konkuk appointment was for a one-year contract. Sabur returned to New York in 2009 and did not continue in the position.

== Deepwater Horizon oil spill ==
In June 2010, Sabur appeared on CNN and Fox News' Hannity to discuss an idea that BP had considered as a possible response to the Deepwater Horizon oil spill in the Gulf of Mexico.

== Legal and patent-examining career ==
After turning from academic materials science to law, Sabur became an attorney specializing in intellectual property. The Irish Times reported in 2015 that she was working for the United States Patent and Trademark Office, drawing on her engineering background while helping others protect their research rights. The Stony Brook Press had reported in 2013 that she was working for the USPTO as a patent examiner. Patent-examiner analytics site PatentBots lists examiner "Sabur Alia" in USPTO Art Unit 2812, which covers active solid-state devices and semiconductor-device manufacturing.
