= Alya Hassan =

Emirati volleyball player (born 1987)

Personal information
- Nationality: Emirati
- Born: 4 August 1987 (age 39)

Volleyball information
- Number: 2 (national team)

National team
2011	United Arab Emirates

Alya Hassan (born 4 August 1987) is an Emirati female volleyball player. She was part of the United Arab Emirates women's national volleyball team.

She won the bronze medal at the 2011 Pan Arab Games.
