= Şem'i =

Şem'i (fl. second half 16th century; died 1591) was the pen name (takhallus) of Şemʿullah Mustafa ibn Mehmed, an Ottoman Turkish translator and commentator of Persian literary works. He wrote commentaries on the works of famous Persian writers including Attar of Nishapur, Nizami Ganjavi, Saadi Shirazi, Rumi, Hafez and Jami.

Several of his commentaries were written for high-ranking courtiers during the reigns of Sultan Murad III (r. 1574–1595). In February 1587, Murad III ordered Şem'i to write his Turkish commentary on the six-volume Masnavi of Rumi. Murad's sponsoring of Şem'i's commentary resulted in a much wider Turkish readership of the Masnavi.
