= Aliya =

Aliya, Aaliyah, Alia or Aliyah (Arabic: عَلِيَّة or عَالِيَّة) is an Arabic feminine given name. It is the feminine of the name Ali, meaning "high", "exalted", "sublime", "rising" or "ascending" .

== People ==
- Aliyah bint al-Mansur, was the daughter of Abbasid caliph al-Mansur from his spouse Aliyah al-Umayyah.
- Aliya bint Ali (1911–1950), Queen of Iraq
- Aliyah bint al-Mahdi, was the daughter of Abbasid caliph Al-Mahdi (r. 775–785) from his concubine Bahtariyah.
- Aliya (actress) (born 1992), Chinese actress
- Aliya LeeKong (born 1978), American chef, television personality, and author
- Aliya Moldagulova (1925–1944), Soviet and Kazakh sniper
- Aliya Mustafina (born 1994), Russian artistic gymnast
- Aliya Yussupova (born 1984), Kazakh rhythmic gymnast

== See also ==
- Aaliyah (1979–2001), American singer, dancer, actress, and model
- Aaliyah (given name)
- Aliyah (given name)
- Alia (name)
- Alya (name)
- Aliye, name
- Aila (name)
- Ali (name)
