= Ali (name) =

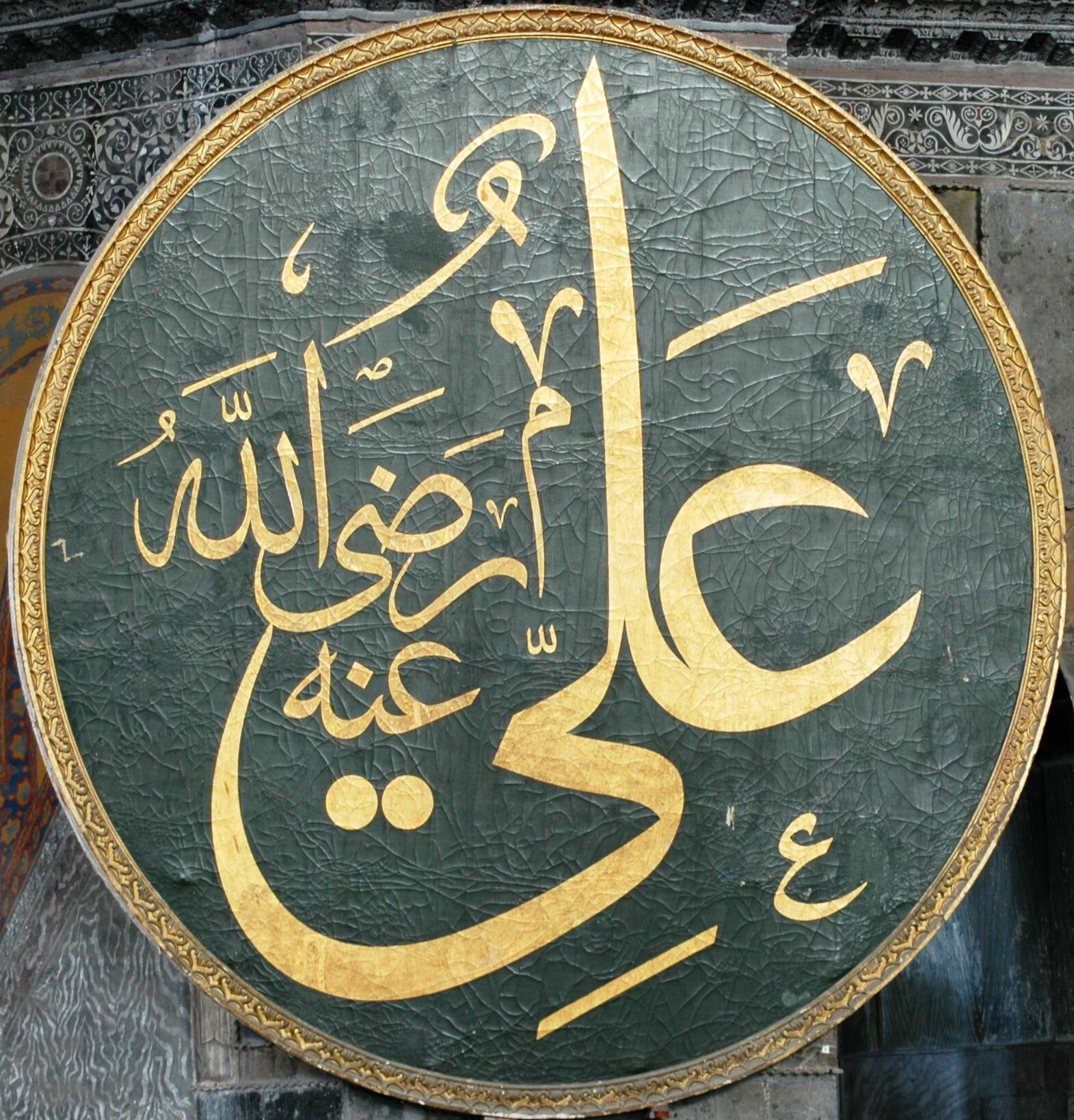
- Calligraphic seal featuring Caliph Ali's name, on display in the Hagia Sophia
- Pronunciation: Arabic: [ˈʕæli] Persian: [ʔæˈliː] Turkish: [aˈli] Urdu: [ʔəˈliː]
- Gender: Unisex
- Language: Arabic (source), Amharic, Azerbaijani, Bashkir, Bengali, Malay, Indonesian, Pashto, Persian, Somali, Swahili, Tatar, Turkish, Turkmen, Urdu, Uzbek, etc.

Origin
- Origin: Arabic, Germanic, Finnish, Hebrew, English, French
- Meaning: eminent, high, exalted, noble
- Region of origin: Arab world/Muslim world, Northern Europe

Other names
- Variant forms: Ally, Aly, Alli, Alley, Allie, Aliy, Aliyy, Alee
- Related names: Eli

Ali is a common unisex given name and surname of multiple origins.

== Origins ==
In Arabic, Ali is derived from the Arabic triconsonantal root ʕ-l-w, which literally means "high", "elevated", "champion", ”king of kings”, ”emperor”, and is used as both a given name and surname. Islamic traditional use of the name goes back to the Islamic leader Ali ibn Abi Talib, but the name is also present among some pre-Islamic Arabs (e.g. Banu Hanifa, and some rulers of Saba and Himyar). It is identical in form and meaning to the Hebrew: עֵלִי, Eli, which goes back to the High Priest Eli in the biblical Books of Samuel.

The Ali surname is especially common in Arab countries and the rest of the Muslim world.

Ali is the most common last name in Qatar, Bahrain, United Arab Emirates, Somalia, Kuwait and Libya. The last name can also be found among the Indian Muslim and Pakistani communities, as it is often associated with the descendants of Ali in these regions.

The name Ali is also used in various other cultures as a given name. Among English speakers it is used as a short form of male or female names starting with "Ali", such as Alice, Alina, Alison, Alisha, Alistair, Alexander, or Alexandra. In Old Norse, Áli and Åle are alternative forms of Onela. Ali is a Finnish male given name, derived from Aleksanteri.

== Islam ==
- Ali ibn Abi Talib (601–661), cousin and son-in-law of the Islamic prophet Muhammad, the fourth Caliph of Sunni Islam.
- Ali ibn Husayn (Zayn al-Abidin) (659–713), grandson of Ali ibn Abi Talib,
- Ali ibn Musa (ar-Ridha) (766–818), eighth infallible Imam in Shia Islam
- Ali ibn Muhammad (al-Hadi) (829–868), tenth infallible Imam in Shia Islam
- Ali ibn Sahl Rabban al-Tabari (838–870), Persian Muslim scholar, physician and psychologist
- Ali al-Muktafi (877/78–908), Abbasīd caliph from 902 to 908
- Ali ibn Husayn Zayn al-Abidin (658/59–712/14), Imam in Shiʻi Islam
- Ali ibn al-Athir (1160–1232/33), 12th- and 13th-century Islamic historian and geographer
- Ali bin Hussein, King of Hejaz (1879–1935), second king of Hejaz

== Given male name ==
=== Arts and entertainment ===
- 'Ali Ashraf (1735–1780), Iranian painter
- Ali Akbar Navis (1924–2003), Indonesian author
- Ali Campbell (born 1959), British singer and member of UB40
- Ali Gatie (born 1997), Iraqi-Canadian singer-songwriter
- Ali Hassan (born 1972), Indian television actor
- Ali Kiba (born 1986), Tanzanian singer and songwriter
- Ali Marhyar (born 1984), French actor, film director and screenwriter
- Ali Özgentürk (1945–2025), Turkish film director
- Ali Rehman Khan (born 1989), Pakistani actor
- Ali Saad (actor), Lebanese actor and voice actor
- Ali Saleem (born 1979), Pakistani television host
- Ali Tutal (1950–2026), Turkish film and television actor
- Ali Salem (1936–2015), Egyptian playwright
- Ali Shahalom (born 1992), British-Bangladeshi comedian
- Ali Shaw (author) (born 1982), British author
- Ali Al-Zein (born 1949), Lebanese actor and voice actor

=== Sports ===
- Ali Adnan Kadhim (born 1993), Iraqi footballer
- Ali Alaaeddine (born 1993), Lebanese footballer
- Ali Alanç (born 1959), Turkish football manager
- Ali Annabi (born 1939), Tunisian fencer
- Ali Asfand (born 2004), Pakistani cricketer
- Ali Bacher (born 1942), South African cricket batsman and administrator
- Ali Daei (born 1969), Iranian footballer
- Ali Daher (born 1996), Lebanese footballer
- Ali Demić (born 1991), Bosnian basketball player
- Ali Dia (born 1965), Senegalese footballer
- Ali Badara Dia (born 1941), Guinea footballer
- Ali Eren Demirezen (born 1990), Turkish amateur boxer
- Ali Fakih (born 1967), Lebanese footballer
- Ali Farahat (born 1975), Egyptian chess player
- Ali Farokhmanesh (born 1988), American basketball player and coach
- Ali Fayad (disambiguation), multiple people
- Haydar Hassan Haj Al-Sidig, also known as Ali Gagarin (1949–2025), Sudanese footballer
- Ali Gaye (born 1998), American football player
- Ali Ferit Gören (1913–1987), Austrian-Turkish Olympic sprinter
- Ali Güneş (born 1978), Turkish footballer
- Ali Kabacalman (born 1995), Swiss footballer
- Ali Kaya (athlete) (born Stanley Kiprotich Mukche in 1994), Kenyan-Turkish long-distance runner
- Ali Kireş (born 1991), Turkish footballer
- Ali Marpet (born 1993), American football player in the NFL
- Ali Marwi (born 1969), Kuwaiti footballer
- Ali Musse (born 1996), Somali footballer
- Ali Noorzad (born 1985), Afghan basketball player
- Ali Ölmez (born 1983), Turkish footballer
- Ali Öztürk (footballer, born 1986) (born 1986), Turkish footballer
- Ali Öztürk (footballer, born 1987) (born 1987), Turkish footballer
- Ali Sabeh (born 1994), Lebanese footballer
- Ali Sami Yen (1886–1951), Turkish Association football entrepreneur
- Ali Sánchez (born 1997), Venezuelan professional baseball player
- Ali Sarı (born 1986), Turkish taekwondo practitioner
- Ali Tandoğan (born 1977), Turkish footballer
- Ali Topaloğlu (born 1998), Turkish track and field athlete with Down syndrome
- Ali Turan (born 1983), Turkish footballer
- Ali Williams (born 1981), New Zealand rugby union player
- Ali Nihat Yazıcı (born 1964), Turkish chess official
- Ali Efe Yeğin (born 1993), Turkish professional motorcycle racer

=== Others ===
- Ali Aaltonen (1884–1918), Finnish Red Guard commander
- Ali Abdo, Ethiopian politician
- Ali al-Abdallah, Syrian writer and human rights activist
- Ali Akdemir (born 1963), Turkish scientist
- Ali Al Bukhaiti (born 1976), Yemeni politician, journalist, and writer
- Ali Alatas (1932–2008), Indonesian diplomat
- Ali Aldabbagh (born 1955), Iraqi engineer and politician
- Ali ibn al-Athir (1160–1233), Hadith expert, historian and biographer
- Ali Abu Awwad (born 1972), Palestinian pacifist
- Ali Babacan (born 1967), Turkish politician
- Ali Saeed Badwan (1959–2025), Palestinian writer
- Ali Mohammad Besharati (born 1945), Iranian politician
- Ali Aref Bourhan (1934–2025), Djiboutian politician
- Ali Bozer (1925–2020), Turkish politician
- Ali Brownlee (1959–2016), English sportscaster
- Ali Çetinkaya (1878–1949), Turkish Army officer
- Ali al-Dandachi (1906–2000), Syrian scout leader
- Ali Dizaei (born 1962), Anglo-Iranian police officer and criminal
- Ali Džabič (1853–1918), Bosnian mufti
- Ali El-Sayed Ali Al-Moselhi (1949–2025), Egyptian politician
- Ali Erdemir (born 1954), Turkish scientist
- Ali Fadel, Iraqi politician
- Ali Hassan al-Majid (1941–2010), Iraqi politician
- Ali ibn Hazm (994–1064), Andalusian Muslim polymath and scholar
- Ali Hekimoğlu (1689–1758), Ottoman grand vizier and general
- Ali Jarbawi (born 1954), Palestinian politician
- Ali Javan (1926–2016), Iranian American physicist
- Ali Karimov (1919–2000), Azerbaijani statesman
- Ali Kaya (serial killer) (born 1979), Turkish serial killer
- Ali Kazak (1947–2025), Palestinian diplomat
- Ali Kemal Bey (1869–1922), Turkish journalist, newspaper editor and poet
- Ali Khademhosseini (born 1975), Iranian-Canadian bioengineer
- Ali Khamenei (1939–2026), former Supreme Leader of Iran
- Ali Kiliç (1519–1587), Ottoman Grand Admiral
- Ali Kony, Ugandan militant and LRA defector
- Ali Kordan (1958–2009), Iranian politician
- Ali Krasniqi (1952–2024), Kosovar Roma writer and activist
- Ali ibn Abbas al-Majusi (died 982/984), 11th-century physician
- Ali Maksum (1915–1989), Indonesian Islamic leader
- Ali al-Masudi (al-Masʿūdī) (896–956), Arab historian, geographer and traveler
- Ali Mech, 13th-century tribal chief
- Ali Akbar Moinfar (1928–2018), Iranian politician
- Ali Moulana (born 1956), Sri Lankan politician, chairman of Eravur Urban Council
- Ali Qanso (1948–2018), Lebanese politician
- Ali İsmet Öztürk (born 1964), Turkish aerobatics pilot
- Ali Abu Al-Ragheb (1946–2026), Jordanian civil engineer and politician
- Ali ibn Ridwan (988–1061), 11th-century astrologer
- Ali Sabancı (born 1969), Turkish businessman
- Ali Sadikin (1926–2008), Indonesian politician
- Ali Said Raygal, Somali politician
- Ali Sastroamidjojo (1903–1975), 8th and 10th Prime Minister of Indonesia
- Ali Sayyar (1926–2019), Bahraini journalist and politician
- Ali bin Hossein Seydi (1498–1563), Ottoman admiral and author
- Ali Shayegan (1903–1981), Iranian politician
- Ali Tayebnia (born 1960), Iranian academic and politician
- Ali Topuz (1932–2019), Turkish politician
- Ali Wallace (naturalist) (1840–1907), assistant to naturalist Alfred Russel Wallace
- Ali Wazir (born 1976), Pakistani politician and leader of the Pashtun Tahafuz Movement
- Ali Yachkaschi (1939–2025), Iranian environmentalist
- Ali Yafie (1926–2023), Indonesian Islamic leader
- Ali Yusuf Kenadid (died 1927), Somali Sultan of the Sultanate of Hobyo
- Ali I of Yejju (died 1788), Ethiopian leader
- Ali II of Yejju (1819–1866), Ethiopian leader

== Given female name ==
=== Arts and entertainment ===
- Ali Barter (born 1986), Australian singer-songwriter
- Ali Bastian (born 1982), English actress
- Ali Benjamin, American author
- Ali Brown (born 1971), American author
- Ali Brustofski (born 1993), American singer
- Ali Bryan, Canadian novelist
- Ali Caldwell (born 1988), American singer
- Ali Cobrin (born 1989), American actress
- Ali Cobby Eckermann (born 1963), Australian poet
- Ali Ewoldt (born 1982), American theatre actress
- Ali Fedotowsky (born 1984), American television presenter
- Ali Gass, American curator
- Ali Hillis (born 1978), American actress
- Ali Kay, American model
- Ali Landry (born 1973), American model and actress
- Ali Larter (born 1976), American actress
- Ali Lee (born 1982), Hong Kong actress
- Ali Liebegott (born 1971), American writer
- Ali Liebert (born 1981), Canadian actress
- Ali Lohan (born 1993), American model and actress
- Ali MacGraw (born 1939), American actress
- Ali McGregor, Australian soprano
- Ali Michael (born 1990), American fashion model
- Ali Rogers (born 1991), American beauty pageant titleholder
- Ali Ryerson (born 1952), American flutist
- Ali Shaw (born 1982), Scottish television presenter
- Ali Smith (born 1962), Scottish author
- Ali Sotto (born 1961), Filipino actress
- Ali Spagnola (born 1984), American musician
- Ali Sparkes (born 1966), British author
- Ali Stephens (born 1991), American model
- Ali Stone (born 1992), Spanish record producer
- Ali Stroker (born 1987), American actress
- Ali Tamposi (born 1989), American songwriter
- Ali Wentworth (born 1965), American actress
- Ali Wong (born 1982), American comedian and actress

=== Sports ===
- Ali Bernard (born 1986), American Olympic athlete
- Ali Brigginshaw (born 1989), Australian international rugby league player
- Ali Frantti (born 1996), American volleyball player
- Ali Johnson (born 1998), English footballer
- Ali Krieger (born 1984), American soccer player
- Ali Loke (born 1993), Welsh squash player
- Ali Riley (born 1987), American-born New Zealand soccer player
- Ali Viola (born 1976), American softball player

=== Others ===
- Ali Cupper (born 1980), Australian politician
- Ali France (born 1973), Australian politicians
- Ali Hewson (born 1961), Irish activist
- Ali Hogg (born 1980), Australian activist
- Ali Vincent (born 1975), American spokeswoman
- Ali Watkins (born 1992), American journalist
- Kao Chin Su-mei (Atayal name: Ciwas Ali, born 1965), Taiwanese politician

== Middle name ==
- Abbas Ali Khalatbari (1912–1979), Iranian diplomat
- Abdus Sobahan Ali Sarkar (born 1976), Bengali MLA of Assam
- Ahmad Ali Sepehr (1889–1976), Iranian historian and politician
- Ahmed Ali Enayetpuri (1898–1959), Bengali author and journalist
- Ajmal Ali Choudhury (1916–1971), Bengali politician
- Akbar Ali Khan (1944–2022), Bangladeshi economist
- Golam Ali Chowdhury (1824–1888), Bengali landlord and philanthropist
- Güzelce Ali Pasha (died 1621), Ottoman statesman and military figure
- Hatem Ali Jamadar (1872–1982), Bengali politician
- Janab Ali Majumdar, Bengali politician
- Lotf Ali Khan (1769–1794), last Shah of the Zand dynasty, of Persia
- Mahbub Ali Khan (1934–1984), Bangladeshi chief of naval staff
- Mehmet Ali Birand (1941–2013), Turkish journalist
- Mohammad Ali Varasteh (1896–1989), Iranian statesman
- Mohammed Ali Qamar, Bengali boxer
- Morshed Ali Khan Panni, Bangladeshi politician
- Müezzinzade Ali Pasha (died 1571), Ottoman statesman and naval officer
- Najib Ali Choudhury, Bengali Islamic scholar
- Osman Ali Sadagar (1856–1948), Bengali-Assamese politician and educationist
- Rowshan Ali Chowdhury (1874–1933), Bengali journalist
- Saif Ali Khan (born 1970), Indian film actor
- Seydi Ali Reis (1498–1563), Ottoman admiral and navigator
- Sherman Ali Ahmed, Bengali MLA of Assam
- Uluç Ali Reis (1519–1587), Italian farmer who became Kapudan Pasha
- Wajid Ali Choudhury (born 1959), Bengali MLA of Assam
- Wajed Ali Khan Panni (1871–1936), Bengali aristocrat
- Wajid Ali Khan Panni II, Bangladeshi politician
- Yakub Ali Chowdhury (1888–1940), Bengali essayist

== Surname ==
=== Arts and entertainment ===
- Aamir Ali (born 1981), Indian television actor
- Ahmad Ali (1910–1994), Pakistani writer
- Ahmad Ismail Ali (1917–1974), Egyptian army officer
- Alauddin Ali (1952–2020), Bangladeshi music composer
- Ali (born 1968), Indian film actor
- Begum Nawazish Ali (born 1979), Pakistani television host
- Egypt Ali, stage name Egypt Speaks (born 1998), American musician
- Filiz Ali (born 1937), Turkish pianist
- Haysam Ali (born 1988), Brazilian-American actor and entrepreneur
- Idris Ali (writer) (1940–2010), Egyptian author
- Imtiaz Ali (born 1971), Indian film director
- Laylah Ali (born 1968), American visual artist
- Mahershala Ali (born 1974), American actor
- Maya Ali (born 1989), Pakistani actress
- Paula Alí (1938 – 2026), Cuban actress
- Shahalom Ali (born 1992), better known as Ali Shahalom, comedian and television presenter
- Rashied Ali (1935–2009), American drummer
- Sadeq Ali (1800–1862), Bengali poet, writer and judge
- Somy Ali (born 1976), Bollywood actress
- Syed Murtaza Ali (1902–1981), Bengali writer and historian
- Tatyana Ali (born 1979), American actress and singer
- Tabyana Ali (born 2002), American actress and writer

=== Sports ===
- Abdulaziz Ali (born 1980), Qatari footballer
- Ahmed Ali (born 1990), Emirati football player
- Ahmad Ismail Ali (1917–1974), Commander-in-Chief of Egypt's army
- Almoez Ali (born 1996), Qatari international footballer of Sudanese descent
- Awais Ali (born 2005), Pakistani cricketer
- Hamdi Ali (born 1997), Qatari high jumper
- Hameen Ali (born 1977), American football player
- Hyder Ali (1720–1782), the Sultan and de facto ruler of the Kingdom of Mysore in southern India
- Imtiaz Ali (born 1954), West Indian cricketer
- Imtiaz Ali (born 1974), Trinidadian cricketer
- Josh Ali (born 1999), American football player
- Jusif Ali (born 2000), Finnish footballer
- Khalid Ali (born 1981), Emirati football defender
- Laila Ali (born 1977), American television personality and former professional boxer, daughter of Muhammad Ali
- Meral Yıldız Ali (born 1987), Romanian-Turkish female table tennis player
- Moeen Ali (born 1987), English cricketer
- Muhammad Ali (1942–2016; born Cassius Clay), American boxer, activist and philanthropist
- Mukhtar Ali (born 1997), Saudi Arabian professional footballer
- Mohamed Ali (born 1992), Indian professional footballer
- Nur Ali (born 1974), Pakistani-American racing driver
- Rahaman Ali (born Rudolph Arnett Clay, later rechristened to Rudolph Valentino) (1943–2025), American boxer, brother of Muhammad Ali
- Rasheen Ali (born 2001), American football player
- Veronica Porché Ali, American psychologist and the former wife of boxer Muhammad Ali

=== Others ===
- Abu Ali (military general) (1945/46–2025), Nigerian military brigadier general and politician
- Abu Saeed Muhammad Omar Ali (1945–2012), Bangladeshi Islamic scholar and translator
- Ahmadu Ali (born 1936), Nigerian politician
- Aishath Ali, Maldivian politician
- Aiyna Ali (born 1997), Trinidad and Tobago politician
- Anwar Ali (born 1974), Pakistani economist
- Ayaan Hirsi Ali (born 1969), writer and politician
- Altab Ali (1953–1978), factory garment worker murdered by three teenagers in a racist attack in East London
- Ayub Ali (1919–1995), Bangladeshi Islamic scholar and educationist
- Ayub Ali Master (1880–1980), British-Bangladeshi social worker and entrepreneur
- Azad Ali, IT worker and civil servant for the HM Treasury
- Azmin Ali (born 1964), Malaysian politician
- Bakhsh Ali, 18th-century Bengali administrator
- Enam Ali (1960–2022), founder of the British Curry Awards, Spice Business Magazine and Ion TV
- Fatima Ali (1989–2019), Pakistani-American executive chef, restaurateur and television personality
- Hassan Al-Ali (Scouting), former General Secretary of the Kuwait Boy Scouts Association
- Hasan ibn Ali (625–670), early Islamic Alid political and religious leader
- Husayn ibn Ali (626–680), early Islamic figure
- Hussein bin Ali, King of Hejaz (1854–1931), Arab leader from the Banu Qatadah branch of the Banu Hashim clan
- Idris Ali (politician) (1950–2024), Indian politician
- Ilias Ali (Bangladeshi politician) (1961–2012), Bangladeshi politician, Organising Secretary of the Bangladesh National Party
- Abul Aziz Muhammad Ismail Ali (1868–1937), Urdu poet and activist
- Jobeda Ali (1975–2020), British social entrepreneur, documentary filmmaker and chief executive of Three Sisters Care
- Kazim Ali (born 1971), American poet, novelist, essayist, and professor
- Mahbub Ali (born 1961), Bangladeshi politician and Member of Parliament
- M. A. Yusuff Ali (born 1955), Indian businessman and billionaire
- Mahmud Ali (statesman) (1919–2006), Indian Freedom Movement leader, statesman
- Mir Masoom Ali (born 1937), Bangladeshi American statistician, Distinguished Professor and author
- Mir Maswood Ali (1929–2009), Canadian statistician and mathematician
- Munsur Ali (born 1978), British film producer, screenwriter and director
- Mustafa Ali (born 1986), American professional wrestler
- Muhammad Shamsi Ali (born 1967), Indonesian-American Muslim scholar
- Siraj Ali (born 1954), British Bangladeshi restaurateur and philanthropist
- Nasim Ali (born 1969), UK Labour Party politician, councillor and former Mayor of Camden
- Noble Drew Ali (1886–1929), founder of the Moorish Science Temple of America
- Ragib Ali (born 1936), Bangladeshi industrialist, pioneer tea-planter, educationalist, philanthropist and banker
- Raushan Ali (1921–1994), former Governor of Jessore
- Rushanara Ali (born 1975), British politician
- Sabahattin Ali (1907–1948), Turkish novelist and journalist
- Saeed Abu Ali (born 1955), Palestinian politician and jurist
- Safiye Ali (1891–1952), Turkish physician
- Saleem Ali (born 1973), Pakistani-American scholar
- Salim Ali (1896–1987), Indian ornithologist and naturalist
- Samina Ali, Indian-American author and activist
- Shah Muhammad Ibrahim Ali (1872–1931), Bengali poet and Islamic scholar
- Sonni Ali (died 1492), first king of the West African Songhai empire
- Syed Mohammad Ali (1928–1993), Bangladeshi journalist, founder of Bangladesh The Daily Star
- Syed Mohsin Ali (1948–2015), Bangladeshi politician, Minister of Social Welfare
- Syed Mujtaba Ali (1904–1974), Indo-Bangladeshi author, journalist, travel enthusiast, academician, scholar and linguist
- Sheikh Razzak Ali (1928–2015), Bangladeshi author, journalist and politician
- Takis Mehmet Ali (born 1991), German politician
- Yashar Ali (born 1979), American journalist with Iranian ancestry
- Zahid Ali (born 1976), Norwegian stand-up comedian
- Zaynab bint Ali (626–682), eldest daughter of Fatima and Ali ibn Abi Talib
- Zine El Abidine Ben Ali (1936–2019), 2nd president of Tunisia

== Derived names ==
=== Male ===
- Abdul Ali
- Ali Reza
- Ali Sher (disambiguation)
- Barkat Ali
- Mehmet Ali

=== Female ===
- Aaliyah
- Aliye
- Aliya

=== Umm Ali ===
- Umm Ali Jijak, mother of Abbasid caliph al-Muktafi

== Mononyms ==
=== Stage name or pseudonym ===
- Ali (actor) (born 1967), Telugu comedian and TV presenter
- Ali (French rapper) (born 1995), French rapper of Moroccan origin
- Ali (graffiti artist) (1956–1994), American artist and musician
- Ali (American rapper), aka Ali Jones, American rapper
- Ali (South Korean singer) (born 1984), South Korean singer
- Ali (wrestler) (born 1986), ring name of Pakistani-American professional wrestler Adeel Alam
- Ali B (born 1981), Dutch rapper
- Ali B (DJ) (born 1975), British DJ
- Ali Bongo (magician) (1929–2009), stage name of British comedy magician William Wallace
- Ali G, stage persona used by comedian Sacha Baron Cohen
- Ali Hassan (actor) (born 1972), Indian television actor
- Ali Official (born 1992), British-Bangladeshi comedian
- Big Ali (born 1978), American rapper and DJ

=== Fictional characters ===
- Ali (character), a Chinese cartoon character
- Ali (House), a character in the television series House
- Ali Baba, a character in the folk tale of Ali Baba and the Forty Thieves
- Ali Osman, a character in the soap opera EastEnders
- Ali Al-Saachez, a character in the anime series Mobile Suit Gundam 00
- Ali Mills, a character from the film The Karate Kid (1984)

== See also ==
- Alli (disambiguation)
- Allie
- Alley (surname)
- Prince Ali (disambiguation)
- Turkish name
