= Paul Oestreicher =

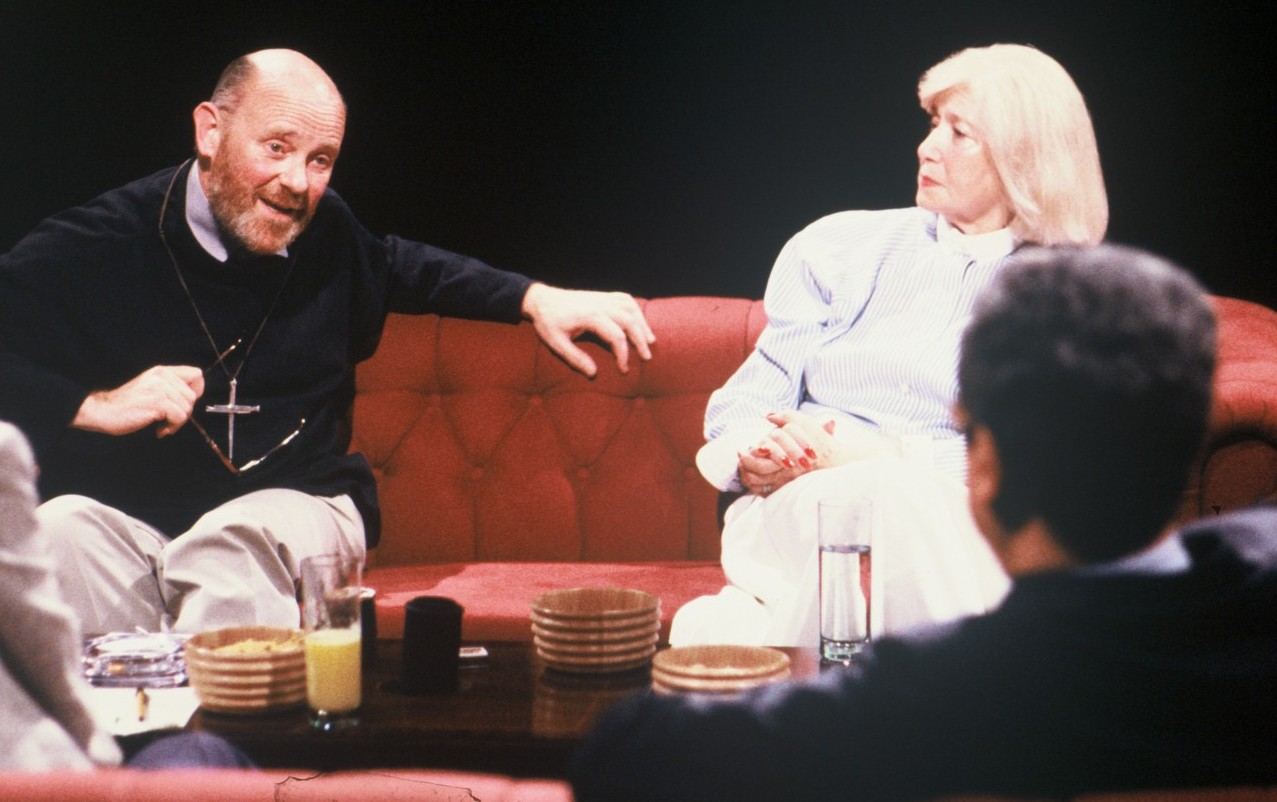
Appearing on television discussion programme After Dark in 1987

Paul Oestreicher OBE (born 29 September 1931) is an Anglican priest, Quaker, peace and human rights activist.

== Family background, education ==
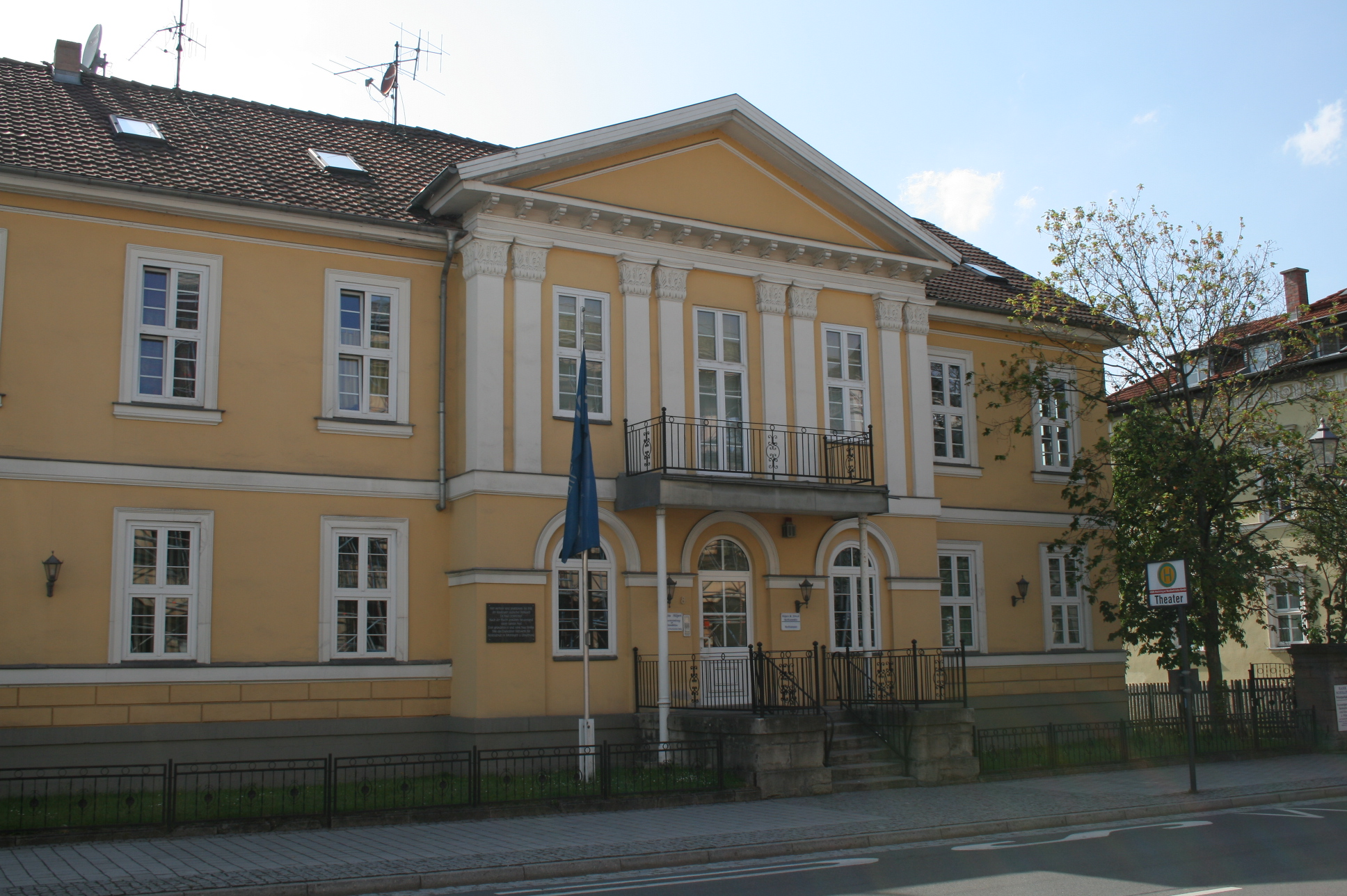
Oestreicher's home in Meiningen until 1938

Oestreicher was born in Meiningen, Germany (then the Weimar Republic) in 1931. In 1938, shortly after he began school, his family had to leave their home in Germany due to the Jewish ancestry of his father, the paediatrician Paul Oestreicher (1896–1981). They found asylum in New Zealand in 1939, where he grew up.

Oestreicher studied Political Science and German Literature at the University of Otago and the Victoria University of Wellington in New Zealand from 1949–1955, completing an MA with a thesis on the history of conscientious objection to WWII in New Zealand (1955). Whilst he was at the University of Otago he was editor of its student newspaper, Critic. He then moved to the University of Bonn for a two-year Alexander von Humboldt research fellowship to study Christianity and Marxism under professor Helmut Gollwitzer.

Between 1956 and 1958, he trained as an Anglican Priest at Lincoln Theological College. There, he married the Berlin physiotherapist Lore, née Feind. There followed four children Barbara, Martin, Nicola and Daniel (dec.).

== Ministry ==
Oestreicher spent from 1958 to 1959 as assistant guest pastor to the German Protestant Church in Rüsselsheim in the church province of Hessen-Nassau, at the invitation of Church President Martin Niemöller. In 1959 he was ordained deacon in St Paul's Cathedral London and priest a year later. He served as curate in the parish of Holy Trinity Church, Dalston in east London, where he was trained by vicar Stanley Evans, a founding member of the Christian Socialist Movement, now Christians on the Left. From 1961 to 1964 he was a Features Producer in the BBC religious broadcasting department, winning an American Radio Award for a programme on abortion.

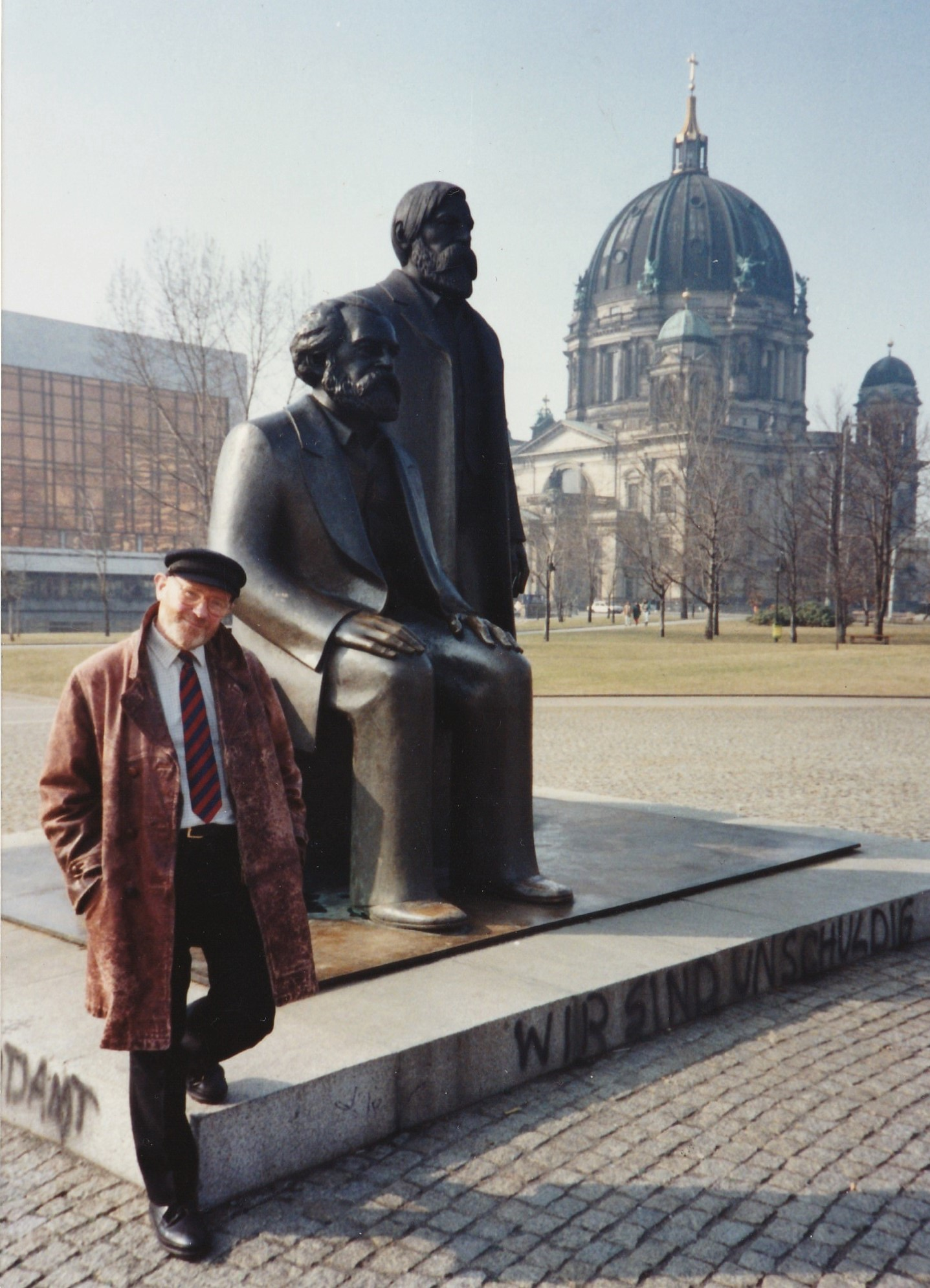
Paul Oestreicher, Marx and Engels, and Berlin Cathedral

From 1964 to 1969 he was the Secretary of the East-West Relations Advisory Committee of the British Council of Churches, continuing this role in an honorary capacity until 1985. He took an active part early on in the Christian Peace Conference (Prague) and in 1964 was elected to its executive committee. On account of his critique of Soviet policies he was expelled from the Executive in 1968. He said his 'parish' stretched from East Berlin to Vladivostok, and he paid 77 pastoral visits to East Germany before the fall of the Berlin Wall.

He was a member of the General Synod of the Church of England from 1970 to 1981 and 1995 to 1997.

From 1968 to 1981 Oestreicher was appointed the parish priest of the Church of the Ascension, Blackheath by John Robinson (bishop of Woolwich). During this time he appointed Deaconess Elsie Baker to lead the pastoral work of the parish, well ahead of the ordination of women to the priesthood. The Church of England eventually ordained her in her 85th year. Oestreicher was a founding member of the Movement for the Ordination of Women.

In 1974 in his personal capacity, he was invited by the West German Minister of Justice, and the families of the prisoners, to help bring to an end a long-lasting hunger strike by the imprisoned members of the Red Army Faction, which had led to deaths inside and, in retaliation, outside the prison system. This entailed mediating between Attorney-General Siegfried Buback and the prisoners. Although partially successful, this mission did not prevent the subsequent deaths of the leading RAF prisoners.

In 1979 he encouraged Helen Bamber to set up the Medical Foundation for Care of Victims of Torture. In 1995 he became President of Action by Christians Against Torture.

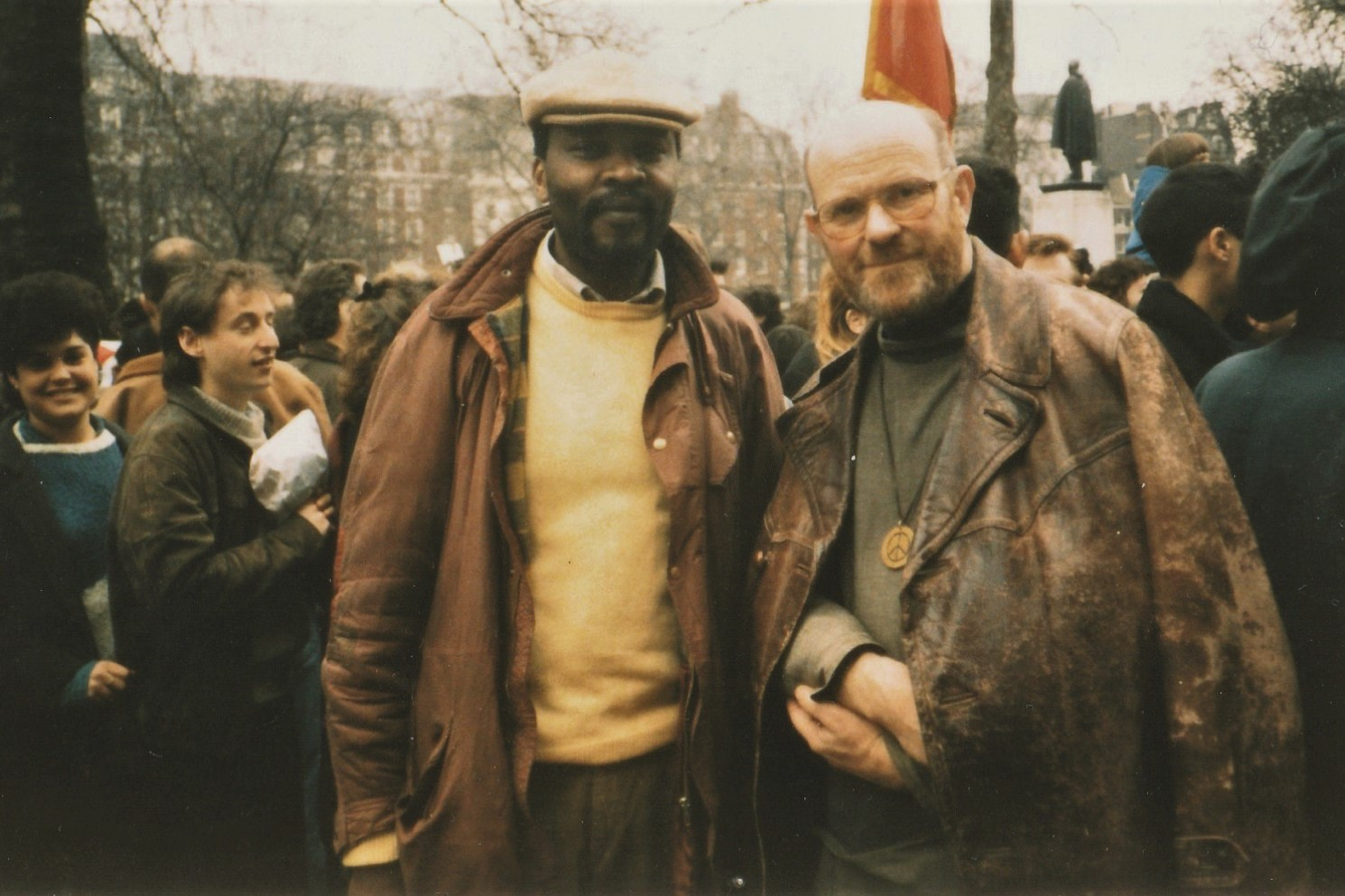
Oestreicher attending a protest against the bombing of Libya, 1986

From 1981 to 1985 he was Director of the Division of International Affairs of the British Council of Churches. As part of this work, in cooperation with the South African Council of Churches, he was actively involved in the Anti-Apartheid Movement. Later, at the invitation of Desmond Tutu, he helped to bring an end to the armed conflict between the African National Congress and Mangosuthu Buthelezi's Inkatha Freedom Party. During this period he became a member of the Society of Friends. He made a substantial contribution to the work of the Dresden Trust, which raised funds in the UK for the reconstruction of the Frauenkirche in Dresden.

In 1985 the Diocesan Synod elected Oestreicher Bishop of Wellington, New Zealand. The Anglican Church leadership declined to ratify this election.

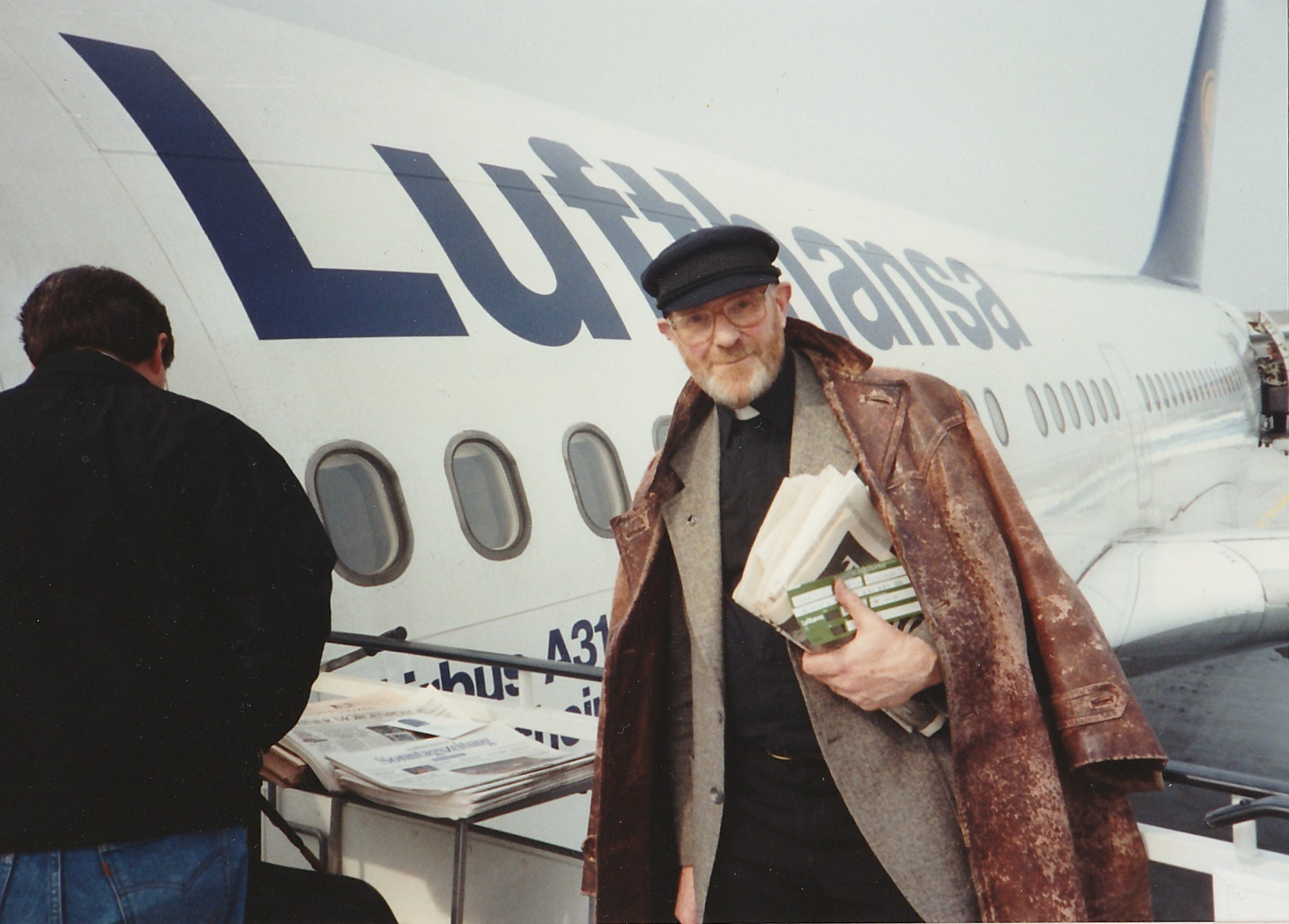
Oestreicher travelling to 50th Anniversary of Dresden bombing

From 1985–1997, Oestreicher was Canon Residentiary and Director of the International Centre for Reconciliation at Coventry Cathedral UK. This enabled him to further the work of the Community of the Cross of Nails. After his retirement, he continued to work in an advisory role with his successor Andrew White (priest).

In 1993, he spent a sabbatical year as Humboldt Fellow at the Free University of Berlin, studying Church-state relations in East Germany.

After his retirement in 1998 Oestreicher continued to work at Coventry Cathedral in an advisory capacity, remaining Canon Emeritus. His wife Lore died in 2000.

He then moved to Brighton, and in 2002 married his second wife, the New Zealander Barbara Einhorn, a professor of Gender Studies at the University of Sussex. They first met after Oestreicher helped get Einhorn released from arrest and imprisonment by the Stasi for befriending a women's dissident peace group. In 2010, Einhorn and Oestreicher both taught for one semester at the National Centre for Peace and Conflict Studies, University of Otago, of which they are still Research Affiliates. He and Einhorn are amongst the founding members of Jews for Justice for Palestinians.

From 2004 to 2009 Oestreicher was honorary Quaker chaplain to the University of Sussex.

In 2011, Oestreicher held the keynote speech on the abolition of war at the World Council of Churches International Ecumenical Peace Convocation (IEPC) in Kingston, Jamaica.

A lifelong pacifist, Oestreicher was co-founder of the Anglican Pacifist Fellowship in New Zealand, and remains a Counsellor of APF UK. In 1959 he joined the Campaign for Nuclear Disarmament and is still one of its Vice-Presidents. He joined Amnesty International at its inception in 1961 and was Chair of AI UK from 1975 to 1979.

In 2020 Oestreicher returned to New Zealand with his wife. They live in Wellington.

Oestreicher was appointed Officer of the Order of the British Empire (OBE) in the 2022 Birthday Honours for services to peace, human rights and reconciliation.

== Awards ==
- Federal Service Cross first class (1995)
- Honorary Citizen, Meiningen, Germany (1995)
- Wartburg Prize for the Promotion of European Unity (1997)
- Award of Merit, Coventry, UK (2002)
- Order of Merit of the Free State of Saxony, Germany (2004)

== Doctorates ==
- DD Lambeth UK (2008)
- DLitt Coventry Polytechnic (1991) (honorary)
- LLD University of Sussex UK (2005) (honorary)
- DD University of Otago New Zealand (2009) (honorary)

== Publications ==
- (Editor, English edn) Helmut Gollwitzer, The Demands of Freedom (1965)
- (Translator) H. J. Schultz, Conversion to the World (1967)
- (Co-editor, with J. Klugmann) What Kind of Revolution: A Christian-Communist Dialogue (1968)
- (Editor) The Christian–Marxist Dialogue (1969)
- (Joint author) The Church and the Bomb (1983)
- (Sole author) The Double Cross (1986); German version with a foreword by Desmond Tutu, Aufs Kreuz gelegt. Erfahrungen eines kämpferischen Pazifisten (1993)
- Frequent articles in The Times, The Guardian, the Church Times, and German publications

== See also ==
- List of peace activists
