= Imtiaz Ali =

Imtiaz Ali may refer to:

- Imtiaz Ali (cricketer) (born 1954), West Indian Test cricketer
- Imtiaz Ali (1990s cricketer) (born 1974), Trinidadian cricketer
- Imtiaz Ali (director) (born 1971), Indian film director and writer
- Imtiaz Ali Taj (1900–1970), Pakistani playwright, best known for the 1922 play Anarkali
- Imtiaz Ali 'Arshi' (1905–1981), Indian Urdu scholar and writer

== See also ==
- Imtiaz, a male given name from Arabic
- Ali (disambiguation)
