= Demic =

Demic may refer to:

- Demic diffusion, a demographic term referring to a migratory model
- The Demics, a 1970s Canadian punk rock band
- Larry Demic (born 1957), American basketball player
- Ali Demić (born 1991), Bosnian basketball player
