= Yu Jie =

Chinese-American writer and Calvinist democracy activist

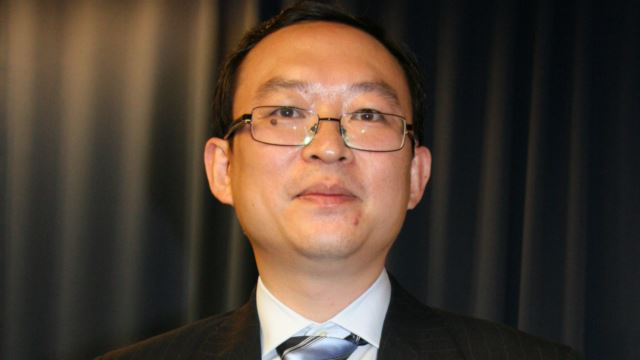
- Born: October 3, 1973 (age 52); Chengdu, Sichuan
- Occupations: Novelist, critic, essayist
- Writing career
- Period: 1998–present
- Notable works: Fire and Ice (1999); China's Best Actor: Wen Jiabao (2010)
- Notable awards: Civil Courage Prize (2012)

Chinese name
- Traditional Chinese: 余杰
- Simplified Chinese: 余杰
Transcriptions
Standard Mandarin
- Hanyu Pinyin: Yú Jié

Yu Jie (Chinese: 余杰), is a Chinese-born American writer and Calvinist democracy activist of Sichuan Mongol descent. The bestselling author of more than 30 books, Yu was described by the New York Review of Books in 2012 as "one of China's most prominent essayists and critics". In addition, he has a Revisionist tendency towards the Japanese militarism in World War II.

Yu Jie is also active in the Chinese dissident movement, and was arrested and allegedly tortured in 2010 for his friendship with Nobel Peace Prize laureate Liu Xiaobo and a critical biography of Prime Minister Wen Jiabao titled China's Best Actor. Following more than a year of house arrest, Yu emigrated to the US with his family in January 2012. Later that year, he was awarded the Civil Courage Prize of the Train Foundation. More recently, he has become among the most outspoken Chinese-dissident supporters of Donald Trump's policies towards China. Upon Justice Ruth Bader Ginsburg's death in 2020, Yu says he "laughed to the heavens" to celebrate the death of "America's most evil enemy."

== Writing career ==
Originally from Chengdu, Yu attended Peking University and majored in modern Chinese literature.

His first book, Fire and Ice, included extensive political and social criticism. Upon its 1999 publication, Yu became a "literary sensation". In the same year, he met and befriended democracy activist Liu Xiaobo, and became active in the Chinese dissident movement. As part of his work with Liu, he read and commented on drafts of the democracy manifesto Charter 08 and helped found the Independent PEN Center.

Yu became a bestselling author in China and as of 2012, had written more than 30 books. However, his criticisms of the government eventually caused his works to be banned in mainland China.

In 2004, Yu published the piece "Apologies to Tibet" (向西藏懺悔) on boxun.com, which expressed regret for China's rule of Tibet and praised the efforts of Palden Gyatso, a pro-independence monk. His piece was criticized by Chinese netizens and he was heckled by overseas students in Los Angeles for attacking "national unity", but he dismissed these critics as angry brainwashed youth. Yu Jie also promotes reconciliation with Japan, the US invasion of Iraq, and religious freedom in China for Christians, after converting to Christianity himself.

=== Awards and honors ===
In 2012, Yu was named the winner of the 2012 Civil Courage Prize of the US-based Train Foundation. The prize recognizes "steadfast resistance to evil at great personal risk — rather than military valor." The prize comes with a $50,000 honorarium. He was the first Chinese person to win the award, and he stated that he hoped the prize would encourage China's dissidents.

== Personal life ==
Yu has a wife, Liu Min, and one son, Yu Guangyi. He converted to Christianity in 2003, and in China was a member of a house church.

=== 2010 arrest ===
Yu was detained by security officials in July 2010 to discuss his upcoming book China's Best Actor: Wen Jiabao, "a scathing critique" of China's prime minister that Yu intended to publish in Hong Kong. The book argued that Wen's warm, empathic public persona was simply a facade, and that he shared the same goals of other Chinese leaders. According to Yu, one official stated that his book was "harming state security and the national interest", and if it were published, Yu would probably be imprisoned "for many years". Yu nonetheless proceeded with publication of the book in August.

On October 8, 2010, Yu's good friend Liu Xiaobo was named the winner of the Nobel Peace Prize. On October 13, Yu was placed under house arrest, allegedly for his plans to write a biography of Liu as well as for having proceeded with the publication of China's Best Actor. He later wrote that during this period, "I was tortured by the country's secret police and nearly lost my life". According to Yu, he was stripped naked, burned with cigarettes, and beaten until he was hospitalized.

His house arrest, and a concomitant travel ban, lasted until January 2012, at which point he and his family emigrated to the US. Following his emigration, he submitted a nine-page report detailing his alleged torture to the US State Department and the United Nations Human Rights Council. He stated that he was continuing to write Liu's biography, and was also at work on a new biography of Chinese president Hu Jintao titled "Hu Jintao: Cold-Blooded Tyrant".

=== Controversial behavior ===
In 2020, when Associate Justice of the Supreme Court of the United States Ruth Bader Ginsburg died, and both the Democratic Party and the Republican Party expressed their silent tribute. However, Yu Jie said that he "can't help laughing up to the sky", and called her "the worst enemy of the United States". Regarding the Black Lives Matter, he wrote an article criticizing it as "anarchism" that is "more evil than dictatorship".

In November 2023, he wrote an article on Facebook saying that if China had been colonized by Japan in World War 2, it would have been at least half as good as Taiwan. This comment immediately aroused fierce criticism from some who claimed to be US, British and Australia veterans who could speak Chinese from the Allies of World War II, criticizing Yu Jie for ignoring the atrocities committed by the Japanese army around the world during World War II like Bangka Island massacre, Nanjing Massacre, Chichijima incident that if Japan was to successfully colonize China, it would bring China and the whole world to a worse place. They cited that the Japanese of today and the Japanese of World War II cannot be confused at all. Yu Jie defined them as "abusing the Japanese" and claimed that they would be blocked and dealt with.

Yu Jie once wrote a long article called "Why I'm Not Optimistic about Ai Weiwei" criticizing Ai Weiwei, and Ai Weiwei personally attacked Yu Jie on Twitter, claiming Yu to be an "idiot".

Chinese Weiquan lawyers Gao Zhisheng revealed in the book "2017, Rise Up China" that Secretary of the Party Committee of the Beijing Municipal Bureau of Justice, the first political commissar of the Beijing Prison Administration Bureau and member of the Political and Legal Committee of the Beijing Municipal Party Committee Yu Hong Yuan (Chinese:于泓源) once persuaded him to surrender, and mentioned that Yu Jie had been bribed by the Chinese government: "Recently I had a personal talk with Yu Jie, and the result was very good. When talking about you, Yu Jie said that he did not want to mention your name, and I don't even want to talk about your problem. His views are simple but incisive, and he is worthy of being a cultural person. He said that Gao is not only a person who has no political sense at all, but a person who has no brains. Did you hear me? I only said you are simple-minded, so let's not go further, just look at Yu Jie, who knows how to advance and retreat, this is a brainy person. This time he was surprised that there are people like me in the system who are open-minded (in fact, this was because I used the usual tricks), the talks went very smoothly, and I am willing to keep in touch with us. I hope that every time there are non-academic articles or books to be published in the future, let our government read them first before publishing them, and they readily agreed, went smoother than I imagined. I have leeway, you have leeway.

In 2008, Yu Jie wrote a long article criticizing Yang Jia. He wrote an article called "Don't Treat Criminals as Heroes", describing Yang Jia as Hitler. Liu Xiaobo also wrote an article criticizing Yang Jia at the time, Liu Xiaobo said at the time that Yang Jia's killing of the police was "primitive justice". The attitudes of Yu Jie and Liu Xiaobo towards Yang Jia at that time were very controversial in the pro-democracy circles. Many people criticized them for being too similar to the CCP.

In 2006, Yu Jie, Wang Yi and Li Boguang were received by President George W. Bush at the White House, but at that time they jointly rejected Guo Feixiong, which made it impossible for Guo Feixiong to meet with the president of the United States. And afterwards, the U.S. State Department's news announcement was "The President of the United States met with Chinese human rights activists", but Yu Jie insisted afterwards that it was "an exchange between American Christians and three Chinese Christians", deliberately ignoring the matter of human rights. This also caused many people who supported Guo Feixiong to be very dissatisfied with Yu Jie. The press release issued by the U.S. State Department clearly stated: "President George W. Bush meets with Chinese Human Rights activists." Not a single word here mentions that this is a religious event or a personal exchange with Chinese Christians. However, Yu Jie wrote an article after the fact, saying, "I regard the meeting as a beautiful sharing between an American Christian and three Chinese Christians," and "Between Bush as a Christian and three Christians from Chinese house churches." personal communication". Cao Chang Qing stated This practice of narrowing the meeting with Bush is to reduce the weight of the US President and the US government's attention to China's human rights.

At the end of 1999-2000, Yu Jie published the article "Yu Qiuyu, Why Don't You Repent" as he is a student in Peking University, in which he questioned Yu Qiuyu, "If all Chinese people do not repent, then China's freedom and justice only exist in the 'past' and the 'future'. If We have all lost the memory of suffering, crime, and responsibility like Mr. Yu Qiuyu, so the happiness and peaceful life we expect will never be guaranteed." Call it "the leftover of the Cultural Revolution" (after Yu Jie In the article "We are Guilty, We Repent", it is inappropriate to use "the leftover of the Cultural Revolution", and apologize to Yu Qiuyu for this title in this article). Yu Qiuyu wrote a defense in "Answer to Mr. Yu Jie". This is also the only time Yu Qiuyu published an article to respond to any criticism by name. After that, the two met in Chengdu. Not long after, Yu Jie published a long article "We are Guilty, We Repent - and Answers to Mr. Yu Qiuyu", arguing that in Yu Qiuyu's statement of many specific facts, "there are a lot of things that avoid the important, contradict themselves and even turn black and white." It is necessary to make my own inquiries, doubts and rebuttals". Yu Qiuyu did not respond directly to this. However, there are opinions that Yu Jie relied on hearsay and Sun Guangxuan's "family possession materials" as evidence; some people think that Yu Jie should feel lucky that Yu Qiuyu did not investigate his legal responsibility; Some people feel sorry that Yu Jie, as an author with creative ability in his own right, unites with Sun Guangxuan, Jin Wenming and others who are famous only by criticizing Yu Qiuyu.

In 2022, after the death of Queen Elizabeth II, Yu Jie wrote an article on Facebook, claiming that Hong Kong people called the Queen a "wife of affairs"(Chinese:事頭婆) (localized nicknames by Hong Kong), which reflected the "ignorance" of the Chinese about the British political order which caused criticism from many netizens, some netizens accused him of deleting other people's messages and some netizens posted on Instagram to refute Yu Jie's statement that "wife of affairs" is just a friendly approach in Hong Kong, and everyone knows that the Queen has no actual power based on the constitutional monarchy. They also criticized Yu Jie and others like him have Pride and Prejudice as an older generation Public Intellectual which gossip at the new generation of pro-democracy activists.

== Main works ==
- Yu, Jie. Governance with Common Sense: Right-wing Trump's Ruling Wisdom (用常識治國：右派商人川普的當國智慧 yong changshi zhiguo: youpai shangren chuanpu de dangguo zhihui) Taipei: Gusa Publishing, 2020.
- Yu Jie (2017). Steel Gate to Freedom: The Life of Liu Xiaobo. Rowman & Littlefield. ISBN 9780810896369.
- Fire and Ice (1998), Economy Daily Press, China.
- Screams within Iron House (1998), Chinese Industry & Commerce Syndicate Press.
- Fire and Ice (1999), (Hong Kong edition), Cosmos Books.
- To Say, or not to Say (1999), Culture and Art Publishing House.
- Awkward Times (1999), YueLu Publishing House.
- Civilization Pain (1999), (Self Anthology), Bai Hua Publishing House.
- Fly the Wings (2000), China Film Publishing House.
- The Road of Wandering Hero - The Mind History of the Transformation Intellectuals in our times (2009), Taiwan Linking Publishing Co.
- China's Best Actor: Wen Jiabao (2010), New Century Publishing Co.

== See also ==
- Protestantism in Sichuan
