= Shahnaz Bukhari =

Pakistani women's rights activist

- Education: Punjab University
- Occupations: Psychologist and activist
- Organization: Progressive Women's Association
- Known for: Activism for women's rights
- Children: Two sons and two daughters
- Awards: Civil Courage Prize (2003)

Shahnaz Bukhari (or Bokhari) is a Pakistani clinical psychologist and women's rights activist. She is founder and director of the non-governmental organization, Progressive Women's Association (PWA), which documents and engages in advocacy to curb violence against women.

== Education and work ==
She holds a Master's of Science from Punjab University, Lahore. After graduation, she worked as a family counselor in Saudi Arabia for seven years. On returning to Pakistan in 1984, Bukhari observed that there were no services for victims of violence and resolved to fill the void. She founded the Progressive Women's Association (PWA) the following year, an organization to help female victims of social and domestic violence. In 1994, the PWA also began taking on cases of acid and burn victims. She also edits and publishes the magazine Women's World.

The same year, the PWA successfully lobbied Prime Minister Benazir Bhutto to have all-female police stations established. In 1999, Bukhari converted her family home in Rawalpindi into AASSRA, Pakistan's first shelter home for battered women with children. Bukhari and the Progressive Women's Association have uncovered over 5,675 stove-death victims as part of the 16,000 cases they have documented of violence against women. From 1994 to 2008, the PWA documented 7,800 cases of acid attacks in the Islamabad area.

In 2001, Bukhari was arrested for "abetting an attempt to commit adultery" after sheltering a woman from an abusive husband at AASSRA. She was cleared of the charges two years later. According to Bukhari, she and her family have also received numerous threats as well as subject to frequent police raids.

== Personal life ==
She is the single parent of two sons and two daughters, the eldest of which serves as her chief assistant. Her former husband lives in the United States.

== Awards and recognitions ==
Bukhari won the Civil Courage Prize of the US-based Train Foundation in 2003, awarded for "steadfast resistance to evil at great personal risk — rather than military valor." One year later, Women's eNews named her one of "21 Leaders for the 21st Century".

She is also recipient of Weimar human rights award 2001.
