= Phillip Buck =

Korean-American activist (born 1941)

Phillip Jun Buck
- Born: 1941 (age 84–85); Ongjin County, South Hwanghae Province, Korea, Empire of Japan
- Occupation: Missionary
- Organization: Assemblies of God Korean District
- Known for: activism for North Korean refugees
- Awards: Civil Courage Prize (2007)

Reverend Phillip Jun Buck is a Korean-American Christian missionary for Assemblies of God Korean District and an advocate for human rights in North Korea. In 2007, he won the Civil Courage Prize for his work on behalf of North Korean refugees.

== Early life and education ==
Buck was born in South Hwanghae Province, Ongjin County, Korea, Empire of Japan in 1941. He was separated from his family during the Korean War and fled to South Korea in the 1950s. He later attended Han Sae University, receiving a Bachelor's and Master's in theology. In 1982, he emigrated to Seattle, Washington in the US, and became a naturalized US citizen in 1989.

== Mission work ==
Buck began his mission work with Assemblies of God Korean District in January 1992 in Khabarovsk and Vladivostok, Russia, establishing churches in both cities. In 1994, he began to evangelize in China, working there for the next twelve years.

In 1997, he expanded his ministry to North Korea as well, founding a noodle factory at Sun Bong Goon during the North Korean famine. Raising money in the US, he established a network of shelters for North Korean refugees within China, compared by Time magazine to the US Underground Railroad. In 2002, he avoided arrest by chance after an informant gained entry to one of his safe houses, leading to a police raid; Buck happened to be out of the country. He then gave up his birth name and legally changed his name to Phillip Buck so that he could return undetected.

By 2012, Buck had helped more than 200 North Korean refugees escape and resettle in South Korea.

== Arrest ==
On May 9, 2005, Buck was arrested in Yanji by Chinese authorities while escorting a group of 14 North Korean refugees. He was imprisoned for 15 months before being released through the intervention of the US Embassy, but was banned from returning to China. Columnists for The New York Times described the arrest as a sign of "a gradually hardening Chinese posture" toward the growing number of North Korean refugees.

Though his children asked him to stop his work given his increasing age—Buck was 65 at the time of his release—Buck stated that he intended to continue.

== Recognition ==
In 2007, Buck was awarded the Civil Courage Prize of the Train Foundation, which recognizes "steadfast resistance to evil at great personal risk — rather than military valor". The prize came with a cash award of $50,000.

== See also ==
- Adrian Hong
