= Ölmez =

Ölmez (Turkish: immortal) is a Turkish surname. Notable people with the surname include:

- Ali Ölmez (born 1983), Turkish footballer
- Cahit Ölmez (born 1963), Dutch actor
- Orhan Ölmez (born 1978), Turkish singer, composer, and songwriter
