= Prince Ali =

Prince Ali may refer to:

== People ==
- Prince Ali bin Hussein (born 1975), third son of King Hussein of Jordan
- Mahershala Ali (born 1974), American actor
- Mustafa Ali (born 1986), American professional wrestler
- Aly Khan (1911–1960), Pakistani diplomat of Iranian and Italian descent
- Ali Reza Pahlavi (born 1922) (1922–1954), second son of Reza Shah Pahlavi, Shah of Iran
- Ali Reza Pahlavi (born 1966) (1966–2011), member of the Pahlavi Imperial Family of the Imperial State of Iran
- Patrick Ali Pahlavi (born 1947), member of the deposed Pahlavi dynasty of Iran
- Shah Alam II (previously Prince Ali Gauhar; 1728–1806), seventeenth Mughal Emperor and the son of Alamgir II

== Other uses ==
- Ali, a character in the Middle-Eastern folk tales One Thousand and One Nights
- "Prince Ali" (song), two musical numbers from the 1992 Disney animated film Aladdin
- Prince Ali Stadium, a multi-purpose stadium in Mafraq, Jordan

== See also ==
- Ali (name)
