= China's Best Actor: Wen Jiabao =

2010 book by Yu Jie

- First edition
- Author: Yu Jie
- Original title: 中国影帝温家宝
- Language: Chinese
- Publisher: New Century Press (新世紀出版社), Hongkong
- Publication place: China
- Pages: 388
- ISBN: 978-988-19-4302-6

China's Best Actor: Wen Jiabao (Chinese: 中国影帝温家宝) is a book published by Chinese dissident author Yu Jie on August 16 in Hong Kong. The book is "a scathing critique" of China's premier Wen Jiabao, arguing that Wen's warm, empathic public persona was simply a facade, and that he shared the same goals of other Chinese leaders. It includes sections such as "How the myth of Wen Jiabao was created?" and "Skeptical view of online conversation between Wen Jiabao and netizens".

Because Yu's books had been banned in mainland China due to his dissident politics, he published China's Best Actor in Hong Kong. He was detained by security officials in July 2010 to discuss the upcoming publication. According to Yu, one official stated that his book was "harming state security and the national interest", and if it were published, Yu would probably be imprisoned "for many years". Yu nonetheless proceeded with publication of the book in August.

On 8 October 2010, Yu's good friend Liu Xiaobo was named the winner of the Nobel Peace Prize. On 13 October, Yu was placed under house arrest, allegedly for his plans to write a biography of Liu as well as for having proceeded with the publication of China's Best Actor. He later wrote that during this period, "I was tortured by the country’s secret police and nearly lost my life". According to Yu, he was stripped naked, burned with cigarettes, and beaten until he was hospitalized.

His house arrest, and a concomitant travel ban, lasted until January 2012, at which point he and his family emigrated to the US.
