= 2018 European Superstock 1000 Championship =

2018 FIM Superstock 1000 Cup
Previous:	2017	Next:	none
Support series: Superbike World Championship; Supersport World Championship; Supersport 300 World Championship

The 2018 European Superstock 1000 Championship was the twentieth season of the FIM Superstock 1000 Cup, the fourteenth held under this name. The championship, a support class to the Superbike World Championship at its European rounds, used 1000 cc motorcycles and was reserved for riders between 16 and 28 years of age. The season was contested over eight races, beginning at Motorland Aragón on 15 April and ending at Circuit de Nevers Magny-Cours on 30 September.This was the final year of the FIM Superstock 1000 Cup was held as Dorna WSBK discontinued the series for the following year.

== Race calendar and results ==
2018 calendar
Round	Country	Circuit	Date	Pole position	Fastest lap	Winning rider	Winning team
1	Spain	Motorland Aragón	15 April	(Germany) Markus Reiterberger	(Germany) Markus Reiterberger	(Germany) Markus Reiterberger	alpha Racing Van Zon-BMW
2	Netherlands	TT Circuit Assen	22 April	(Germany) Markus Reiterberger	(Germany) Markus Reiterberger	(Germany) Markus Reiterberger	alpha Racing Van Zon-BMW
3	Italy	Autodromo Enzo e Dino Ferrari	13 May	(Chile) Maximilian Scheib	(Italy) Roberto Tamburini	(Italy) Matteo Ferrari	Barni Racing Team
4	United Kingdom	Donington Park	27 May	(Germany) Markus Reiterberger	(Germany) Markus Reiterberger	(Germany) Markus Reiterberger	alpha Racing Van Zon-BMW
5	Czech Republic	Brno Circuit	10 June	(Germany) Markus Reiterberger	(Italy) Alessandro Delbianco	(Chile) Maximilian Scheib	Aprilia Racing Team
6	Italy	Misano World Circuit Marco Simoncelli	8 July	(Germany) Markus Reiterberger	(Germany) Markus Reiterberger	(Germany) Markus Reiterberger	alpha Racing Van Zon-BMW
7	Portugal	Autódromo Internacional do Algarve	16 September	(Italy) Federico Sandi	(Italy) Roberto Tamburini	(Italy) Roberto Tamburini	Berclaz Racing Team
8	France	Circuit de Nevers Magny-Cours	30 September	(Italy) Federico Sandi	(Italy) Roberto Tamburini	(Italy) Federico Sandi	MOTOCORSA Racing

== Entry list ==
2018 entry list
Team	Constructor	Motorcycle	No.	Rider	Rounds
Nuova M2 Racing	Aprilia	Aprilia RSV4 RF	9	(Italy) Andrea Mantovani	3, 5–6
Aprilia Racing Team	Aprilia	Aprilia RSV4 RF	7	(Chile) Maximilian Scheib	All
Aprilia Racing Team	Aprilia	Aprilia RSV4 RF	70	(Italy) Luca Vitali	All
alpha Racing Van Zon-BMW	BMW	BMW S1000R	28	(Germany) Markus Reiterberger	All
alpha Racing Van Zon-BMW	BMW	BMW S1000R	45	(Germany) Jan Bühn	All
Berclaz Racing Team SA	BMW	BMW S1000R	2	(Italy) Roberto Tamburini	All
Berclaz Racing Team SA	BMW	BMW S1000R	23	(Italy) Luca Salvadori	All
D.K. Racing	BMW	BMW S1000R	6	(Italy) Emanuele Pusceddu	1–3, 5–8
DMR Racing	BMW	BMW S1000R	47	(Italy) Axel Bassani	6
DMR Racing	BMW	BMW S1000R	81	(Italy) Alex Bernardi	6
GULF Althea BMW Racing Team	BMW	BMW S1000R	52	(Italy) Alessandro Delbianco	All
Motos Vionnet	BMW	BMW S1000R	51	(Switzerland) Eric Vionnet	1–6, 8
TME Racing	BMW	BMW S1000R	69	(Czech Republic) Dominik Juda	5
Barni Racing Team	Ducati	Ducati 1199 Panigale R	11	(Italy) Matteo Ferrari	3, 6
Barni Racing Team	Ducati	Ducati 1199 Panigale R	76	(Italy) Samuele Cavalieri	3, 6
EAB Schacht Racing Team	Ducati	Ducati 1199 Panigale R	59	(Denmark) Alex Schacht	All
MOTOCORSA Racing	Ducati	Ducati 1199 Panigale R	15	(Italy) Federico Sandi	All
MOTOCORSA Racing	Ducati	Ducati 1199 Panigale R	77	(Philippines) TJ Alberto	All
MOTOCORSA Racing	Ducati	Ducati 1199 Panigale R	84	(Italy) Riccardo Russo	6
C.M. Racing A.S.D.	Kawasaki	Kawasaki ZX-10R	33	(Indonesia) Ahmad Yudhistira	7
C.M. Racing A.S.D.	Kawasaki	Kawasaki ZX-10R	41	(Italy) Federico D'Annunzio	6
C.M. Racing A.S.D.	Kawasaki	Kawasaki ZX-10R	73	(Italy) Jacopo Cretaro	8
C.M. Racing A.S.D.	Kawasaki	Kawasaki ZX-10R	84	(Italy) Riccardo Russo	1–5
ETG Racing	Kawasaki	Kawasaki ZX-10R	34	(Spain) Xavier Pinsach	1–2
Flembbo Leader Team	Kawasaki	Kawasaki ZX-10R	31	(Switzerland) Valentin Suchet	All
Flembbo Leader Team	Kawasaki	Kawasaki ZX-10R	46	(France) Maxime Cudeville	All
Kawasaki PALMETO Pl Racing	Kawasaki	Kawasaki ZX-10R	17	(Spain) Lucas de Ulacia	7
Moto 82	Kawasaki	Kawasaki ZX-10R	82	(Czech Republic) Karel Pesek	2
Nutec - Benjan - Kawasaki	Kawasaki	Kawasaki ZX-10R	10	(Turkey) Ali Efe Yeğin	1–5
Nutec - Benjan - Kawasaki	Kawasaki	Kawasaki ZX-10R	89	(United Kingdom) Fraser Rogers	2
Team Pedercini Racing	Kawasaki	Kawasaki ZX-10R	16	(Italy) Gabriele Ruiu	All
Unisery	Kawasaki	Kawasaki ZX-10R	82	(Czech Republic) Karel Pesek	5
FM Motoracing	Yamaha	Yamaha YZF-R1	22	(Italy) Stefano Fugardi	6
FM Motoracing	Yamaha	Yamaha YZF-R1	80	(Italy) Armando Pontone	3, 6
Riding Sensation	Yamaha	Yamaha YZF-R1	14	(France) Johan Nigon	8
SPEED ACTION	Yamaha	Yamaha YZF-R1	12	(Italy) Alessandro Andreozzi	1
SPEED ACTION	Yamaha	Yamaha YZF-R1	55	(Italy) Fabio Marchionni	1–3, 6
Team OGP	Yamaha	Yamaha YZF-R1	39	(France) Randy Pagaud	8
Team SWPN	Yamaha	Yamaha YZF-R1	4	(Netherlands) Ricardo Brink	2
URBIS Yamaha Motoxracing STK Team	Yamaha	Yamaha YZF-R1	18	(Italy) Agostino Santoro	6
URBIS Yamaha Motoxracing STK Team	Yamaha	Yamaha YZF-R1	21	(France) Florian Marino	All
Yamaha Team MGM	Yamaha	Yamaha YZF-R1	44	(Netherlands) Danny de Boer	2

Key
Regular rider
Wildcard rider
Replacement rider

- All entries used Pirelli tyres.

== Championship standings ==
=== Riders' championship ===
Position	**1st**	**2nd**	**3rd**	**4th**	**5th**	**6th**	**7th**	**8th**	**9th**	**10th**	**11th**	**12th**	**13th**	**14th**	**15th**
Points	25	20	16	13	11	10	9	8	7	6	5	4	3	2	1

Pos.	Rider	Bike	ARA (Spain)	ASS (Netherlands)	IMO (Italy)	DON (United Kingdom)	BRN (Czech Republic)	MIS (Italy)	ALG (Portugal)	MAG (France)	Pts
1	(Germany) Markus Reiterberger	BMW	**1**	**1**	5	**1**	**4**	**1**	3	3	156
2	(Italy) Roberto Tamburini	BMW	2	2	2	3	8	4	1	2	142
3	(Chile) Maximilian Scheib	Aprilia	4	3	**3**	2	1	2	5	14	123
4	(Italy) Federico Sandi	Ducati	3	4	4	6	7	5	**2**	**1**	117
5	(France) Florian Marino	Yamaha	5	5	7	5	3	7	4	4	93
6	(Italy) Luca Vitali	Aprilia	7	6	6	4	6	9	Ret	5	70
7	(Italy) Alessandro Delbianco	BMW	Ret	8	9	Ret	2	DNS	6	6	55
8	(Italy) Gabriele Ruiu	Kawasaki	12	7	11	11	12	10	8	10	47
9	(Italy) Riccardo Russo	Kawasaki	9	9	Ret	7	9				46
9	(Italy) Riccardo Russo	Ducati						3			46
10	(Italy) Luca Salvadori	BMW	8	11	12	13	Ret	11	7	9	41
11	(Germany) Jan Bühn	BMW	Ret	10	14	8	14	13	9	8	36
12	(Italy) Matteo Ferrari	Ducati			1			Ret			25
13	(Denmark) Alex Schacht	Ducati	11	Ret	Ret	9	Ret	15	10	11	24
14	(Italy) Andrea Mantovani	Aprilia			8		5	Ret			19
15	(Switzerland) Eric Vionnet	BMW	DSQ	DSQ	13	10	16	18		7	18
16	(Philippines) TJ Alberto	Ducati	13	19	Ret	12	11	16	11	Ret	17
17	(Italy) Samuele Cavalieri	Ducati			10			8			14
18	(Italy) Emanuele Pusceddu	BMW	Ret	Ret	15		10	DNS	12	WD	11
19	(Italy) Alessandro Andreozzi	Yamaha	6								10
20	(Italy) Axel Bassani	BMW						6			10
21	(Spain) Xavier Pinsach	Kawasaki	10	13							9
22	(France) Maxime Cudeville	Kawasaki	15	19	18	15	15	20	13	16	6
23	(Switzerland) Valentin Suchet	Kawasaki	14	15	19	14	17	Ret	Ret	Ret	5
24	(Netherlands) Ricardo Brink	Yamaha		12							4
25	(Italy) Agostino Santoro	Yamaha						12			4
26	(France) Johan Nigon	Yamaha								12	4
27	(Turkey) Ali Efe Yeğin	Kawasaki	16	WD	DNQ	DNQ	13				3
28	(Italy) Jacopo Cretaro	Yamaha								13	3
29	(United Kingdom) Fraser Rogers	Kawasaki		14							2
30	(Italy) Alex Bernardi	BMW						14			2
31	(Indonesia) Ahmad Yudhistira	Kawasaki							14		2
32	(Spain) Lucas de Ulacia	Kawasaki							15		1
33	(France) Randy Pagaud	Yamaha								15	1
	(Italy) Fabio Marchionni	Yamaha	Ret	16	16			Ret			0
	(Czech Republic) Karel Pesek	Kawasaki		17			19				0
	(Italy) Armando Pontone	Yamaha			17			19			0
	(Italy) Federico D'Annunzio	Kawasaki						17			0
	(Czech Republic) Dominik Juda	BMW					18				0
	(Italy) Stefano Fugardi	Yamaha						21			0
	(Netherlands) Danny de Boer	Yamaha		Ret							0
Pos.	Rider	Bike	ARA (Spain)	ASS (Netherlands)	IMO (Italy)	DON (United Kingdom)	BRN (Czech Republic)	MIS (Italy)	ALG (Portugal)	MAG (France)	Pts

Colour	Result
Gold	Winner
Silver	Second place
Bronze	Third place
Green	Points finish
Blue	Non-points finish
Blue	Non-classified finish (NC)
Purple	Retired (Ret)
Red	Did not qualify (DNQ)
Red	Did not pre-qualify (DNPQ)
Black	Disqualified (DSQ)
White	Did not start (DNS)
White	Withdrew (WD)
White	Race cancelled (C)
Blank	Did not practice (DNP)
Blank	Did not arrive (DNA)
Blank	Excluded (EX)

**Bold** – Pole position
Italics – Fastest lap
