= Barkat Ali =

Barkat Ali is a male Muslim given name, composed of the elements Barkat or Barakat meaning blessings, and Ali meaning of the most high. it may refer to

- Barkat Ali (boxer) (born 1935), Pakistani Olympic boxer
- Barkat Ali (politician), Pakistani politician from Kech District
- Malik Barkat Ali (1886–1946), Indian politician, lawyer, journalist and academic
- Sufi Barkat Ali (1911–1997), Pakistani Sufi saint
- Barkat Ali Khan Mukarram Jah Asaf Jah VIII, known as Prince Mukarram Jah (born 1933), Head of the House of the Nizam of Hyderabad
