= Helmut Gollwitzer =

German Protestant (Lutheran) theologian and author (1908–1993)

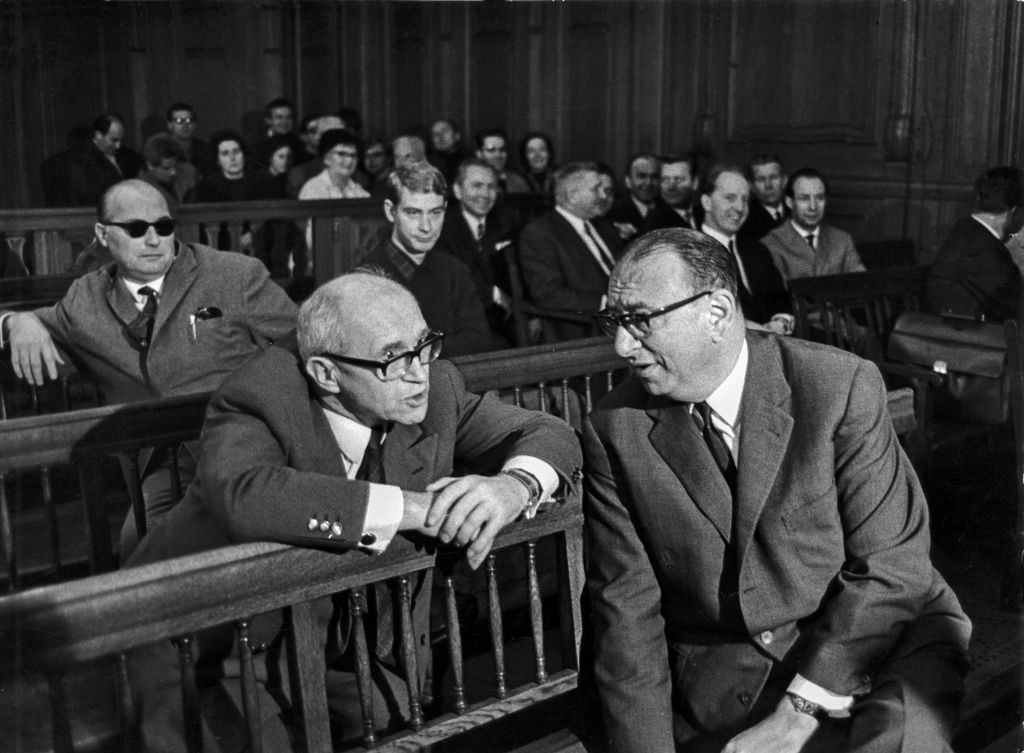
Helmut Gollwitzer (left) and Heinrich Albertz (November 1967)

Helmut Gollwitzer (29 December 1908 – 17 October 1993) was a German Protestant (Lutheran) theologian and author.

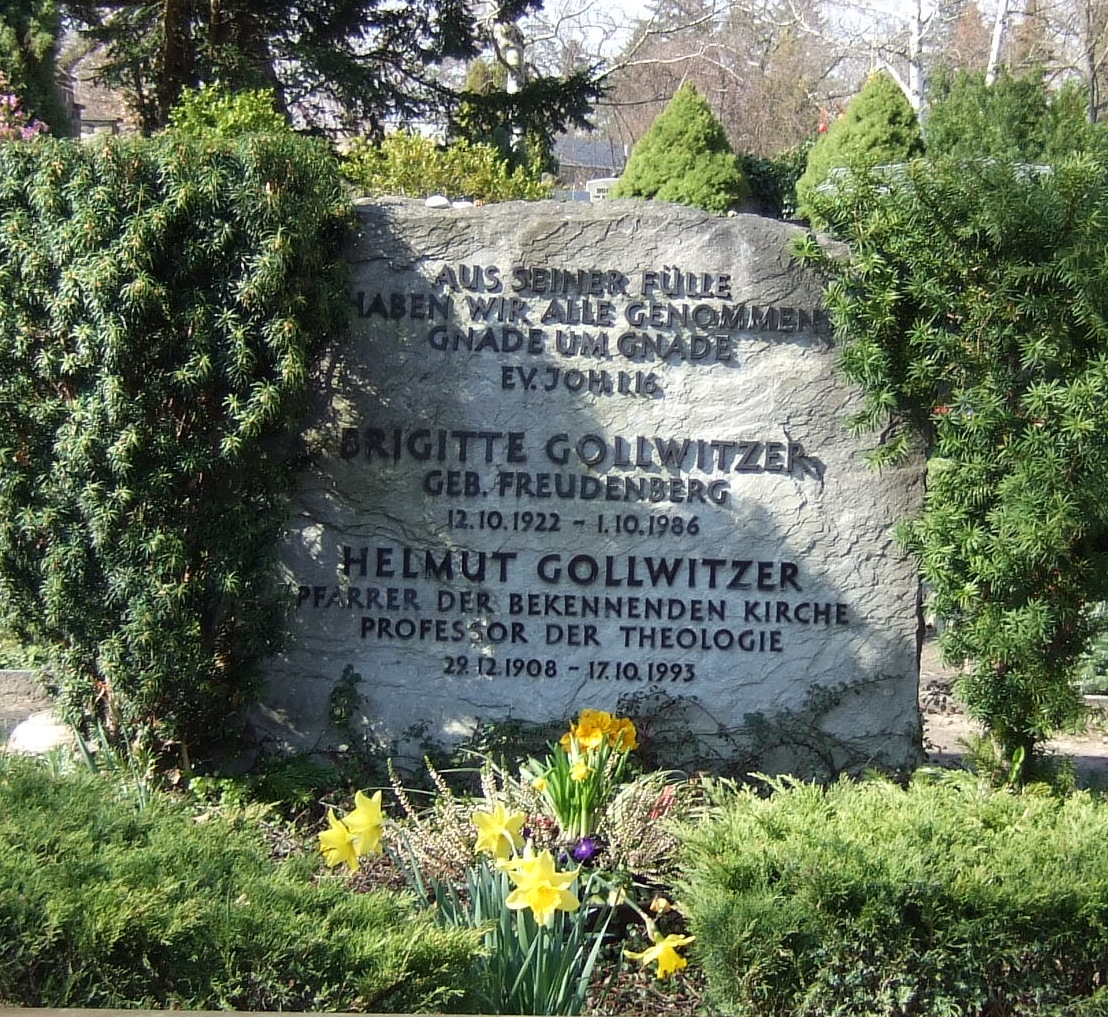
Gollwitzer's grave in Berlin

Born in Pappenheim, Bavaria, Gollwitzer studied Protestant theology in Munich, Erlangen, Jena, and Bonn (1928–1932); he later completed a doctorate under Karl Barth in Basel (1937), writing on the understanding of the eucharist in Martin Luther and John Calvin.

During the period of the Nazi regime in Germany, Gollwitzer was a well-known member of the Confessing Church movement, which resisted the regime's attempt to control the churches. He took over as the pastor of the congregation at Berlin-Dahlem after the arrest of Martin Niemöller.

During World War II, Gollwitzer served as a medic at the Eastern Front, and was a prisoner of war in the Soviet Union from 1945 to 1949. He wrote a book about his experience of being a POW which became a bestseller in Germany in 1950 (Unwilling Journey: A Diary from Russia); the then President of West Germany, Theodor Heuss, called it "a great historical document".

Gollwitzer was appointed professor of systematic theology at the University of Bonn (1950–1957), and then as professor of Protestant theology at the Free University of Berlin; he retired in 1975. He had been Karl Barth's first choice as his successor in Basel, but the university authorities turned him down due to what they called 'his unclear attitude to the Soviet Union'. Dr. W. Travis McMaken illustrates Gollwitzer's role in the theology and politics of the twentieth century in his latest book, Our God Loves Justice: An Introduction to Helmut Gollwitzer. He explains Gollwitzer's close relationship with Barth, and the socialist political ideas Gollwitzer held throughout his life.

Known as a close friend of Rudi Dutschke, whose wife studied with Gollwitzer, and a pastor to Ulrike Meinhof, he was prominently involved in the political debates ensuing in the late 1960s and 1970s. He was also a friend to student movements since his time as a professor. In the 1950s, one of his students at the University of Bonn, Paul Oestreicher, wrote in The Independent that Gollwitzer was a pastor at heart, being equally concerned with students' personal issues like a "broken love affair" as with matters such as "the betrayal of Christian values" in Bonn society. Gollwitzer was a pacifist and a well-known opponent of nuclear escalation during the 1950s to 1980s. He opposed United States engagement in Vietnam, in the arms race, and was a staunch critic of capitalism.

Gollwitzer died in Berlin on 17 October 1993.

== Literature ==
- Gollwitzer, H 1953. Unwilling Journey: A Diary from Russia. Philadelphia: Muhlenberg Press.
- Gollwitzer, H 1956. Dying We Live: The Final Messages and Records of the Resistance. New York: Pantheon.
- Gollwitzer, H 1965. The Demands of Freedom: Papers by a Christian in West Germany. New York: Harper & Row.
- Gollwitzer, H 1965. The Existence of God as Confessed by Faith. London: SCM.
- Gollwitzer, H 1970. The Christian Faith and the Marxist Criticism of Religion. New York: Scribner.
- Gollwitzer, H 1970. The Rich Christians and Poor Lazarus. New York: Macmillan.
- Gollwitzer, H 1979. Song of Love: A Biblical Understanding of Sex. Minneapolis: Fortress Press.
- Gollwitzer, H 1982. An Introduction to Protestant Theology. Philadelphia: Westminster Press.
- McMaken, W. Travis 2017. Our God Loves Justice: An Introduction to Helmut Gollwitzer. Minneapolis: Fortress Press.
