= Ali Salem =

Egyptian playwright and author (1936–2015)

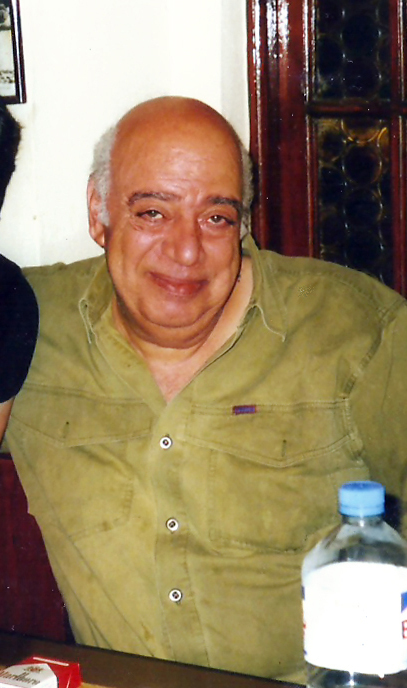
- A meeting in Cairo between Salem and representative of Mothers and Women for Peace from Israel, 1998.
- Born: 24 February 1936; Damietta, Egypt
- Died: 22 September 2015 (aged 79); Mohandessin, Egypt
- Occupation: playwright
- Awards: Civil Courage Prize (2008)

Ali Salem, also transliterated Ali Salim (Arabic: على سالم, IPA: [ˈʕæli ˈsæːlem]; 24 February 1936 – 22 September 2015), was an Egyptian playwright known for controversially endorsing cooperation with Israel. The Los Angeles Times once described him as "a big, loud man known for his satiric wit".

== Career ==
From the premiere of his first play in 1965, he wrote 25 plays and fifteen books. One of the best known, The School of Troublemakers, debuted in 1971 and featured a rowdy class of children transformed by a kind teacher. His plays The Phantom of Heliopolis, The Comedy of Oedipus, The Man Who Fooled the Angels, and The Buffet have also become "classics of the Egyptian theater". Salem's plays often include allegorical critiques of Egyptian politics with a strong vein of humor and satire.

In 1994, he wrote a book entitled My Drive to Israel about a trip he took to the country to satisfy his curiosity about it following the signing of the Oslo Accords. He later claimed that the trip was not "a love trip, but a serious attempt to get rid of hate. Hatred prevents us from knowing reality as it is". He spent 23 nights in Israel and concluded that "real co-operation" between the two nations should be possible. Though the book sold more than 60,000 copies, a bestseller by Egyptian standards, it provoked controversy, and Salem was subsequently ostracized from the Egyptian intellectual community and expelled from its Writer's Syndicate as a result of his "propaganda." He did not have a play or movie script produced in Egypt after the book's publication, though he continued to contribute columns to foreign media such as the London-based Al Hayat. Salem's memoir was later adapted by Ari Roth into the play Ali Salem Drives to Israel, which had its world premiere in the US in 2005.

In 2008, he won the Train Foundation's $50,000 Civil Courage Prize in recognition of his opposition to Islamic extremism and his support of cooperation with Israel. He also received an honorary doctorate from Israel's Ben-Gurion University of the Negev in 2005.

== Death ==
He died in Cairo on 22 September 2015, after a long illness.

== Sources ==
- Hugi, Jacky. "Death of Egyptian author who drove across Israel leaves void in Israeli-Egyptian relations", Al-Monitor on-line magazine; 30 Sept. 2015.
- Mikics, David. "The Muslim World's Intellectual Refuseniks Offer Enlightened Views on Islam and Israel", TabletMag.com on-line magazine; 3 Dec. 2013.
