= Civil Courage Prize =

Human rights award

The Civil Courage Prize is a human rights award which recognizes "steadfast resistance to evil at great personal risk—rather than military valor." The prize was founded in 2000 by the Northcote Parkinson Fund. The goal of the prize is not to create a "ranking", but "to draw attention individually to some extraordinary heroes of conscience." It was inspired by the example of Soviet dissident Alexander Solzhenitsyn.

== History ==
In 2007, the Northcote Parkinson Fund's name was changed to The Train Foundation in recognition of the contributions of the family of investment advisor John Train, the fund's primary donor.

In 2022, the board of trustees consisted of seven members:

- John Train (chair)
- George C. Biddle, Trustee and co-chairman; chairman, World Connect (co-chair)
- Louis N. Bickford, CEO of MEMRIA.ORG (treasurer)
- Ariadne Calvo-Platero, journalist (president)
- Musa T. Klebnikov, Paul Klebnikov Fund Executive Director
- The Hon. Nicholas Platt, Former U.S. Ambassador
- Ann Brownell Sloane, The Eisenhower Foundation

Since 2000, the foundation has awarded the Civil Courage Prize one or two activists each year. The prize comes with a $25,000 honorarium. Nominations are accepted from international non-governmental organizations, while unsolicited nominations are discouraged. The award ceremony is held in New York City or London in October of each year. Keynote speakers have included British historian Michael Howard, US journalist Jon Meacham, British Home Secretary Douglas Hurd, and Chilean President Michelle Bachelet.

Seven posthumous award winners have also been named, ranging from Swedish businessman Raoul Wallenberg, who worked to save the lives of Hungarian Jews during World War II, to Indonesian human rights activist Munir Said Thalib, assassinated in 2004. In 2004 and 2005, the Foundation also awarded "Certificates of Distinction in Civil Courage" to selected prize finalists. The certificates included honorariums of $1,000 apiece.

== Honorees ==
Year	Honorees	Country	Ref.
2000	Nataša Kandić	Yugoslavia	
2001	Paul Kamara	Sierra Leone	
2002	Vladimiro Roca Antúnez	Cuba	
2003	Shahnaz Bukhari	Pakistan	
2004	Emadeddin Baghi	Iran	
2004	Lovemore Madhuku	Zimbabwe	
2005	Min Ko Naing	Myanmar	
2005	Anna Politkovskaya	Russia	
2006	Rafael Marques de Morais	Angola	
2007	Phillip Buck	United States	
2008	Ali Salem	Egypt	
2009	Aminatou Haidar	Western Sahara	
2010	Andrew White	England	
2011	Lydia Cacho Ribeiro	Mexico	
2011	Triveni Acharya	India	
2012	Yu Jie	China	
2013	Denis Mukwege	Democratic Republic of the Congo	
2014	Nicola Gratteri	Italy	
2015	Iris Yassmin Barrios Aguilar	Guatemala	
2015	Claudia Paz y Paz	Guatemala	
2016	Raqqa Is Being Slaughtered Silently	Syria	
2017	Pierre Claver Mbonimpa	Burundi	
2018	Vladimir Kara-Murza	Russia	
2019	Gonzalo Himiob	Venezuela	
2021	Eric K. Ward	United States	
2022	Alexei Navalny	Russia	
2023	Nasrin Sotoudeh	Iran	

== Posthumous honorees ==
Honorees	Year of death	Country	Ref.
Dietrich Bonhoeffer	1945	Germany	
Giovanni Falcone	1992	Italy	
Abdul-Latif Ali al-Mayah	2004	Iraq	
Rosemary Nelson	1999	Ireland	
Munir Said Thalib	2004	Indonesia	
Neelan Tiruchelvam	1999	Sri Lanka	
Raoul Wallenberg	1947	Sweden	

== Certificates of Distinction in Civil Courage ==
Honoree	Year of death	Country	Ref.
2004	Dan Que Nguyen	Vietnam	
2004	Arnold Tsunga	Zimbabwe	
2004	Raphael Wakenge	Democratic Republic of the Congo	
2005	Rajan Hoole	Sri Lanka	
2005	Kopalasingham Sritharan	Sri Lanka	
