= St. George Church, Baghdad =

Anglican church in Baghdad, Iraq

Coordinates: 33.3265°N 44.3953°E

Saint George Episcopal Anglican Church
- كنيسة القديس جرجيس الاسقفية الانجليكانية
- Location: Al-Karkh in Baghdad
- Country: Iraq
- Denomination: Anglicanism

History
- Founded: 1864

The Saint George Episcopal Anglican Church (Arabic: كنيسة القديس جرجيس الاسقفية الانجليكانية, romanized: Kanisat al-Qadis Jirjis al-Isqafiyya al-Enjalikaniyya), or just Saint George Church (Arabic: كنيسة القديس جرجيس, romanized: Kanisat al-Qadis Jirjis), is the only Angilical church located in Baghdad, Iraq. Although the church was founded in 1864, the current building was established in 1936.

The church belongs to the Diocese of Cyprus and the Gulf and currently does humanitarian work at a charity medical clinic in which both Christian and Muslim doctors treat patients. The church was named after Saint George, whose tomb is traditionally also believed to be in Iraq at Mosul.

== Historical background ==
The Angelical church in Baghdad was originally founded in 1864. The current church was then established in 1936 with a memorial dedicated to British soldiers who died in Iraq during World War I. Around 1991, after the Gulf War, the church was closed and the church's structure, including its stained-glass windows, was damaged by American bombings. The church was reopened in 1998 under British clergyman and canon Andrew White. After it was reopened, it was restored with funding from the British Embassy and the Diocese of Cyprus and the Gulf.

== Challenges after 2003 ==
=== During the Iraq War ===
After the 2003 US invasion of Iraq, the Iraq Christian community began to decline due to instability and terrorist attacks. The church became a relief and reconciliation effort, providing food, medical care, and educational support to the remaining Christian community. the On the mornings of October 2009, two suicide bombers was bombed the church, destroying and damaging many structures around the building, including the charity clinic and the last three remaining stained-glass windows. Although the church survived, the bombings killed 150 civilians and injured 600 more.

Shortly after the 2010 Baghdad church siege, the Saint George Church was among the many to receive death threats by a group that called itself the Secret Islamic Army. Later, two of the parishioners of the church were killed by unknown extremists. Although White blamed al-Qaeda in Iraq for the massacres, he also cited Islamophobic activist Terry Jones' Qur'an burnings that fueled extremists and became a “disaster for Christians in the Middle East.”

In 2014, Andrew White was asked to leave Iraq by then-Anglican Reverend Justin Welby due to his support of the US invasion and other security risks. After White left, Faiz Jirjis took over the community responsibilities. Jirjis became the first national Iraqi Anglican priest, and his priesthood was noted for making the community more "Iraqi." Although the British memorial was kept, the church contained textiles written with Arabic calligraphy, a Bible on the lectern written in Arabic, and celebrated Mass in Arabic.

=== Present day ===
As of 2025, the church also runs a charity clinic in which both Christian and Muslim doctors, dentists, and pharmacists treat patients regardless of background. The humanitarian work, led by Jirjis, was recognized by both the Iraqi and British governments. In July 2020, Jirjis was honored with the award of an MBE from Queen Elizabeth II.

In 2023, Jirjis toured around the United States to rally support for the church and bring attention to the current conditions of the Iraqi people, including the Christian community that began to decline after 2003. On 28 November 2023, the church joined a widespread cancellation by other Christian communities of Christmas and New Year celebrations. The move was done by Christian communities across Iraq in solidarity with the victims of the Gaza genocide perpetrated by Israel.

In 22 September 2024, the bishop of the Diocese of Cyprus and the Gulf, Sean Semple, visited the church to preside and preach during Sunday services.

== See also ==
- Christianity in Iraq
- List of Churches in Baghdad
