= Ali Fayad =

Ali Fayad may refer to:

- Ali Fayad (footballer) (born 1991), player of association football
- Ali Fayad (American football) (born 1999), player of American football
- Ali Fayad (arms dealer), Lebanese arms dealer
