= Ali Fadel =

Iraqi politician

Ali Fadel AlMisir is an Iraqi politician who was the Governor of Baghdad Governorate from December 2004 to January 2005.

Fadel is a Muslim. In 1980, he was selected to represent Iraq on the national Olympic soccer team. A debilitating knee injury shortly before the start of the games caused him to be sidelined for the Los Angeles Olympics.

Following the Invasion of Iraq by the United States, Fadel was chosen to sit on the neighbourhood, district and the Provincial council. In December 2004 the Governor of Baghdad, Ali Al Haidary, was assassinated, and Fadel was selected to succeed him as governor.

Fadel lost his seat on the Governorate Council in the governorate elections in January 2005. Afterwards he founded and led the Baghdad League, a network of civil society organisations. He is a Civil Engineer and a graduate of University of Technology.
