= Andrew White (priest) =

British clergyman (born 1964)

- Born: 1964 (age 61–62); Bexley, Kent, England
- Education: Ridley Hall, Cambridge
- Spouse: Caroline
- Children: 2
- Church: Church of England
- Ordained: 1990
- Congregations served: St. George Church, Baghdad
- Offices held: Vicar, Canon

Andrew Paul Bartholomew White (born June 1964) is a British clergyman who was the Vicar of St George's Church, Baghdad, the only Anglican church in Iraq, until his departure was ordered in November 2014 by the Archbishop of Canterbury due to security concerns over his support for the invasion and occupation of Iraq. Known as the "Vicar of Baghdad", White is former president of the Foundation for Relief and Reconciliation in the Middle East. He was previously Director of International Ministry at the International Centre for Reconciliation at Coventry Cathedral, England. He qualified and worked as an operating department assistant prior to becoming ordained.

== Early life ==
White grew up in Bexley, in the suburbs of south-east London in Kent. His family background was a religious mix of strict Baptist and Pentecostal. As a youngster he was very involved in Church life and regularly visited an elderly house-bound woman. During this time he became inspired by the compassion of an Anglican priest who visited her to give her communion.

== Education and call to the priesthood ==
White studied anaesthetics and surgery at St Thomas' Hospital, London, and qualified as an operating department assistant in 1985. He worked in anaesthetics and was a member of the cardiac arrest team. During this time White completed his first Phd in anaesthetics with a specific focus on gynaecology.

After several years working in St Thomas', White realised he had done everything he had set out to achieve and prayed for guidance regarding what was next. He felt drawn to move from medicine to theology with the intent of becoming ordained. He then gained two further doctorates, both in theology. The first doctorate was awarded by the University of Cambridge and the second was awarded by the Hebrew University of Jerusalem. White's first doctoral thesis was on 'the role of Israel in Christian Theology' which he completed at Ridley Hall, Cambridge prior to ordination, and his second doctorate in judaism was awarded by the Hebrew University of Jerusalem. In total, White has completed 3 doctoral theses - one in medicine, two in theology and has been awarded a total of twenty honorary doctorates from British, American, Canadian and Iraqi universities.

White was ordained in the Church of England in 1990, and became a curate at St Mark's, Battersea Rise in the Diocese of Southwark. During his time at Southwark White had his first appearance on TV when was interviewed on the street by a member of the That's Life! team. Not long after marriage, he became a vicar of the Church of the Ascension, Balham, in the same diocese. In 1997 – his final year as vicar of the Church of the Ascension – he was a Wandsworth Borough Councillor and served as Deputy Chairman of Social Services.

== Director of International Ministry ==
In 1998, at the age of 33 years, White was appointed a canon at Coventry Cathedral. He became the Director of International Ministry there, heading up the International Centre for Reconciliation, promoting reconciliation in conflicts (mainly religious) across the globe. He was sent by the Archbishop as the political and religious envoy to the Middle East after the return of Terry Waite.

Canon White played a key role in the Bethlehem Siege, finding methods of conflict resolution to the hostage situation at the Church of the Nativity in Bethlehem in 2002. White concentrated on the Middle East, because he thought that the church needed to be involved there and knew that this was where he would serve. He remained in this post until 2005, when he moved to Baghdad to become Anglican Chaplain to Iraq.

=== Mediation ===
Canon White mediated in the release of the late Jaweed Al-Ghussein elected Chairman of the Palestine National fund and CEO of Cordoba Group. Al-Ghussein, a strong and vocal advocate of the rule of law, was kidnapped from Abu Dhabi with the compliance of Sheik Hamadan Bin Zayed and Sheik Seif Bin Zayed. Al-Ghussein's abductions were the subject of a UN determination that placed his case in category 1, the highest and appointed a rapporteur on Special Torture. Denied access to the Red Cross in Gaza, Canon White was able to visit him and eventually through his position as Special Envoy mediated Jaweed Al-Ghussein's release back to the UK.

== "Vicar of Baghdad" ==
In Iraq, Canon White lived in Baghdad until November 2014, serving as the vicar of St George's Church just outside the Green Zone. He formerly lived in the Green Zone. He has been dubbed "Vicar of Baghdad", because his church is the only remaining Anglican church in Iraq. His people (the congregation of St George's) refer to him as their "Abouna" (Father). Here, he has continued the reconciliation that he promoted during his time as Director of International Ministry at Coventry Cathedral. The Foundation for Relief and Reconciliation in the Middle East was established in 2005 as part of his reconciliation work in Iraq and the Middle East as a whole.

Canon White's main aim has been to try to maintain communication between Shia and Sunni leaders, and to "gain trust of key religious leaders on both sides in various conflict areas". He sees his role as trying to mediate and re-establish the dialogue between conflicting groups.

In November 2014 the Archbishop of Canterbury, Justin Welby, ordered his departure due to the increased security risks and the Church of England's no hostage policy. White was aware of the fear that the Iraqi people had of Saddam Hussein's regime, and he often talks of how he supported the invasion and occupation of Iraq- and continues to support it- but had not foreseen the horrific aftermath.

Canon White has stated that his work is unique largely because of the long-term relationships he has in the Middle East and his religion. Through his work he has become unaccustomed to a normal civilian life, and has said that he would find life in London 'boring'.

In 2014, Canon White's daily efforts and challenges were documented by Vice Media as part of a three part series named 'The Vicar of Baghdad'. Also during 2014 Canon White was voted UK's top Christian of the year on the 'Cranmer list' Canon White continues to maintain his popularity as a major global trans-denominational voice on peace and reconciliation and the persecuted church. He is a regular voice on national and international radio and TV and continues to travel globally, speaking at churches, Bible Schools, universities and political / religious conferences around the world. As well as engaging in national and international public speaking and lecturing, he continues to fulfil his pastoral duties to his displaced Iraqi congregation, many of whom currently reside in Jordan. As well as appearing on various secular TV channels and radio shows nationally and internationally, Canon White has had regular weekly series and shows with TBN UK, GOD TV who in 2019 created an extended documentary on his life, 'Christianity Under Fire'. Canon White remains one of the key global voices concerning the plight of the persecuted church and is dedicated to raising awareness of this issue in all of his work.

== Support of Israel ==
White calls himself "a hassidic vicar". He criticizes Anglican bishops and other Christian clergy who do not support Israel, and support Palestinian rights. White has criticized Anglican Bishops of Jerusalem prior to Suheil Dawani as "awful. They tried to be more Palestinian than the Palestinian Muslims."

== Charities misconduct ==
In 2020 White was banned by the UK Charities Commission from acting as a charity trustee for 12 years after it found that he had intended to funnel money to ISIS, allegedly to pay for the release of persons abducted by the terrorist organization, but had failed to do so. FRRME charitable funds controlled by White were held in his personal account, and not separated from his personal spending. Only 5% of his spending on a charity credit card was accounted for in financial records.

== Previous appointments ==
- Special Envoy to the Middle East – for the Archbishop of Canterbury, The Most Revd. and Rt. Hon. George Carey
- Director of International Ministry and Canon Residentiary – International Centre for Reconciliation, Coventry Cathedral
- Vicar of St George's Church, Baghdad, Iraq
- Eric Lane Fellow (Easter Term 2003) – Clare College, Cambridge

== Current appointments ==
- Emeritus Vicar of St George's Church, Baghdad, Iraq
- Harvard Fellow

== Selected publications ==
- Iraq: People of Promise, Land of Despair (Sovereign World Ltd, 2003) ISBN 9781852403508
- Iraq: Searching for Hope (Continuum, 2005) ISBN 9780826497161
- By The Rivers of Babylon (Self-published, 2008)
- The Vicar of Baghdad (Monarch, 2009) ISBN 9781854248763
- Suffer the Children (Continuum, 2010) ISBN 9781847063748
- Faith Under Fire (Monarch, 2011) ISBN 9781854249623
- Father, Forgive: Reflections On Peacemaking (Monarch, 2013) ISBN 9780857212924
- The Older Younger Brother, The Tragic Treatment of the Jews by the Christians (Self-published, 2014)
- My Journey So Far (Lion Books, 2015, memoir) ISBN 9780745970172
- A Year with Andrew White: 52 Weekly Meditations (SPCK Publishing, 2019) ISBN 9780281079476
- Hidden Treasures, Secret Riches (Destiny Image, 2020) ISBN 9780768456875
- Glory Zone in the War Zone (Destiny Image, 2020) ISBN 9780768453218

== Awards ==
- Liverpool Hope University Hon DD 2017
- Wycliffe College, University of Toronto Hon DD
- The Anne Frank Award (2014)
- The William Wilberforce Award (2014)
- The Sternberg International Council of Christians and Jews Prize (jointly with Lord Coggan) (1991)
- Anglo-Israel Association Prize (2001)
- Sir Sigmund Sternberg Inter-Faith Prize (2003)
- Interfaith Award, British Government (2003)
- Peacemaker in Action Award, The Tanenbaum Center for Interreligious Understanding, United States (2005)
- US Cross of Valor (2006)
- The Woolf Institute of Abrahamic Faiths, Cambridge, Peace Prize (2007)
- Iraq Peace Prize 2010
- The International Civil Courage Prize (2010)
- Honorary Phd University of Gloucestershire (2010)
- Knight Grand Cross and Spiritual Protector of the Order of St George (2011)
- Grand Commander of the Order of Merit of the Knights Templar International (2003).
- Companion of Honour of the Knights Templar International OSMTH/SMOTJ (2002).
- True Freedom Prize of the USA 2012
- 2012 Ultimate Christian Library Book Award for 'Faith Under Fire'

White was awarded the Anglo-Israel Association Prize for his contribution to furthering understanding between the British and Israeli nations. He was awarded the Sternberg Inter-Faith Prize for his work in promoting good relations between Judaism, Islam and Christianity.

== Styles ==
- Mr Andrew White (1964–1990)
- The Revd Dr Andrew White (1990–1998)
- The Revd Canon Dr Andrew White (1998–present)
