= Egypt Speaks =

American singer

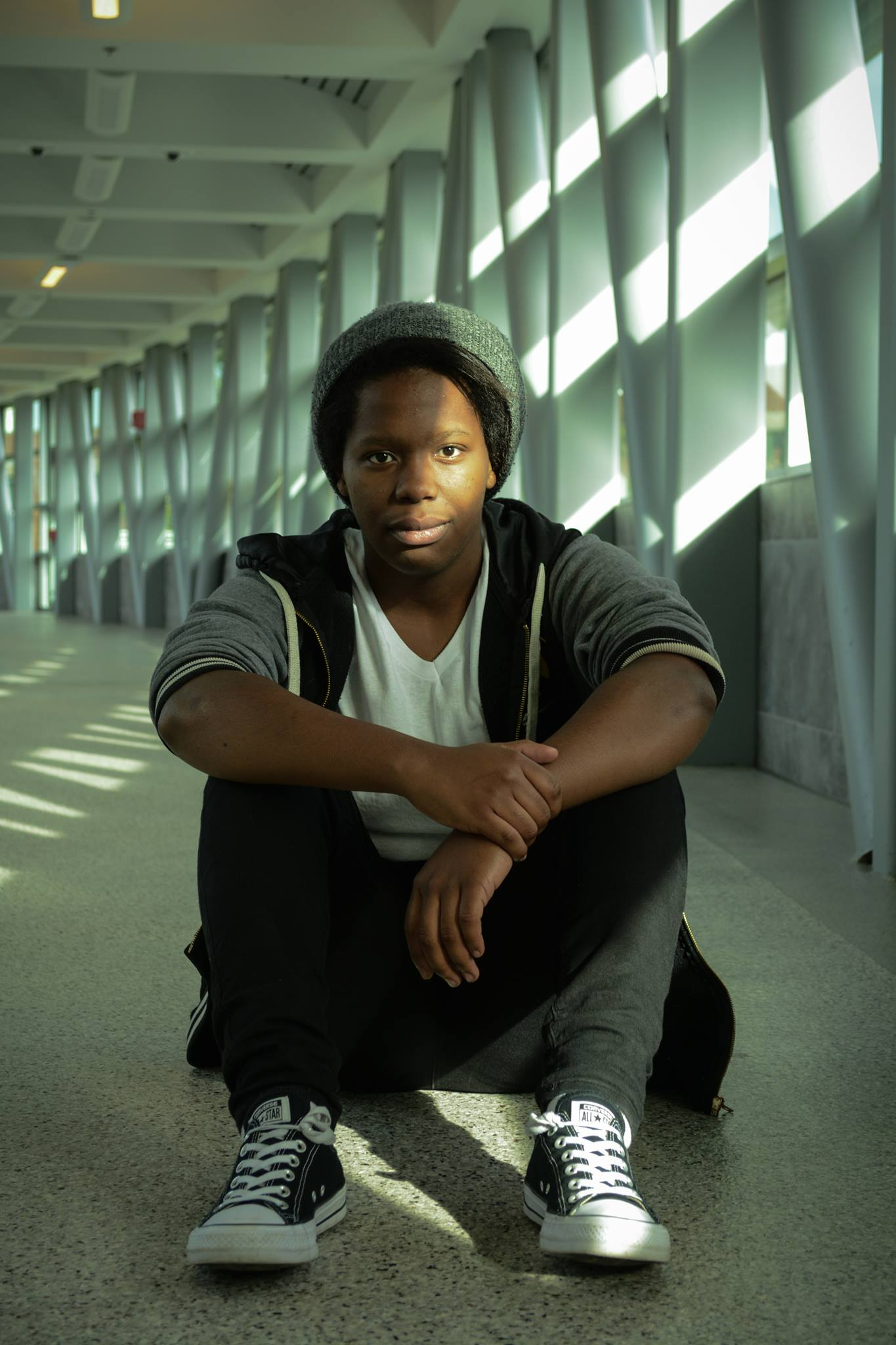
Egypt Speaks

Egypt Ali (born August 5, 1998), from Cleveland, Ohio, who goes by the stage name Egypt Speaks, is an American musician and Spoken Word artist.

== Career ==
Her first release, Once Upon a Word, was released independently in 2014. At age 16, Egypt took first in the state of Ohio and second in the nation in the category of spoken word at the National Fine Arts Festival of 2014.

The next year she placed 3rd in the world during the Young Storytellers Competition. At 17, she released her first book of essays and poetry, Stories, independently. This was followed by the release of her second independent full length project in February of the following year.

She released a studio album with Sanctum Studios entitled Letters and Scars in 2017, the success of which granted her membership in the Recording Academy. Letters and Scars stayed within the ‘iTunes Spoken Word Top 10’ for three consecutive weeks. Her performance in Letters and Scars also caught the attention of the 2017 True Voices Poetry Slam held in New York City.

Her album Cathedrals was released in 2018, and her subsequent album, Wanderer, was released on June 14, 2019.

In July 2019, Speaks performed at JoyFest - VA gospel music festival alongside industry legends Marvin Sapp, Tamala Mann, Mary Mary, and Tasha Cobbs Leonard.

In January 2020, she released her second book "(Almost)" and announced the accompanying 2020 tour "Almost Home", which kicks off a series of North American dates in her hometown of Cleveland.
