= Ali Fayad (footballer) =

Lebanese footballer (born 1991)

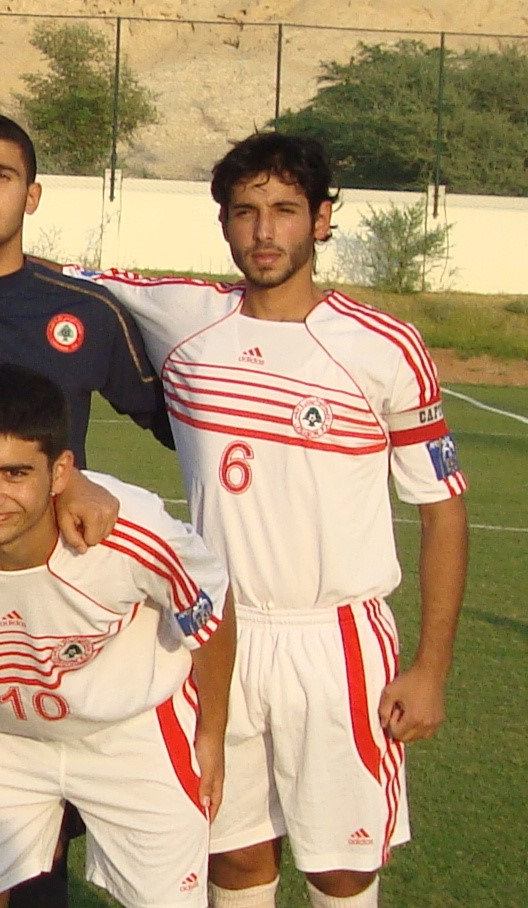
- Fayad with Lebanon U19 in 2009

Personal information
- Full name: Ali Abed El Hasan Fayad
- Date of birth: 22 March 1991 (age 35)
- Place of birth: Beirut, Lebanon
- Height: 1.81 m (5 ft 11 in)
- Position: Midfielder

Youth career
- –2009: Ahed

Senior career*
Years	Team	Apps	(Gls)
2009–2011	Ahed		
2011	→ Mabarra (loan)		
2011–2015	Racing Beirut	35	(0)
2015–2016	Chabab Ghazieh	16	(0)
2016–2017	Sagesse		
2017	Shabab Arabi		

International career
2009	Lebanon U19		
- * Club domestic league appearances and goals

Ali Abed El Hasan Fayad (Arabic: علي عبد الحسن فياض; born 22 March 1991) is a Lebanese former footballer who played as a midfielder. He is the founder and president of "Peña Madridista Beirut", a Lebanese fan club of Real Madrid.

== Club career ==
Coming through the youth system, Fayad began his career with Ahed in 2009. In his two years at Ahed, he won two Lebanese Premier League titles, one Lebanese FA Cup and one Lebanese Super Cup. Fayad then joined Lebanese Premier League side Mabarra on loan ahead of the 2011–12 season. He moved to Racing Beirut in 2011, scoring his first goal in January 2014 against Tadamon Sour.

In September 2015, Fayad left Racing. He joined Chabab Ghazieh in October 2015 on a one-year contract, scoring on his first touch his debut against Salam Zgharta on 17 October 2015. Fayad also played for Sagesse in the 2016–17 Lebanese Second Division, and for Shabab Arabi, with whom he retired in 2017 due to injury-related problems.

== International career ==
Fayad represented Lebanon internationally at under-19 level in 2009.

== Post-playing career ==
In 2017, Fayad founded "Peña Madridista Beirut", a club for Real Madrid fans in Lebanon. He had an important role in organising the legends of Real Madrid and Barcelona "El Clásico" friendly match in Lebanon the same year. The fan club was officially affiliated to Real Madrid in December 2020.

== Other activities ==
Fayad was the main editor of Yusif, a 2021 feature narrative film directed by his brother Kazim. The film won the Special Jury Award at the Asian World Film Festival, and was the best first cinematic work at the Alexandria Mediterranean Film Festival.

== Honours ==
Ahed

- Lebanese Premier League: 2009–10, 2010–11
- Lebanese FA Cup: 2010–11
- Lebanese Elite Cup: 2010
- Lebanese Super Cup: 2010
