= Ali Al Bukhaiti =

Yemeni journalist and politician

- علي البخيتي
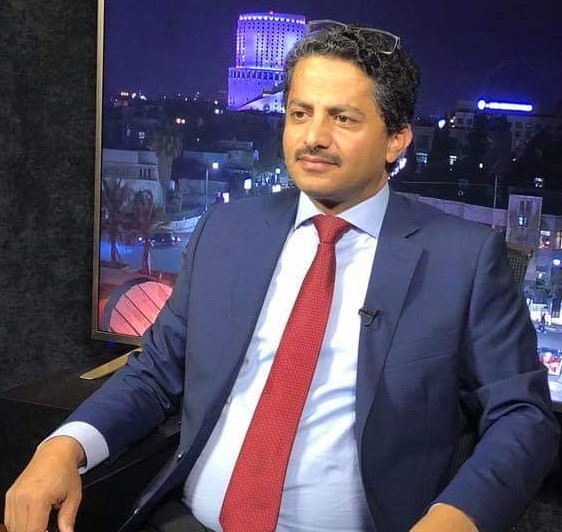

Personal details
- Born: Ali Nasser Qaid Al Bukhaiti (Arabic: علي ناصر قايد البخيتي); September 10, 1976 (age 49) Yemen, Dhamar Governorate
- Children: 1

Ali Nasser Qaid Al Bukhaiti (Arabic: علي ناصر قايد البخيتي; born 10 September 1976) is a Yemeni politician, journalist, and writer.

He was a spokesman for the Houthi movement, until deciding to split up from them. He moved between Saudi Arabia, Jordan and Lebanon, and currently lives in the United Kingdom. He wrote several political articles published on many sites, and appeared on news channels such as BBC, RT, Al-Jazeera, Al-Arabiya and Al-Hurra. Al-Bukhayti was close to the former Yemeni president Ali Abdullah Saleh. He attacked the Houthis and their practices in Yemen, and as a result, he and his relatives were subjected to harassment and threats from them.

In 2019, Al-Bukhaiti declared his "irreligion", and attacked Islam and its rulings. He and his family came under pressure because of this.

== Early life ==
Al Bukhaiti was born in the village of Al-Malha, in Dhamar Governorate, Yemen, in 1976, and spent part of his childhood in Taiz. He is a member of the al-Hada tribe. He moved between several regions in Yemen, and also between different Islamic sects. He was influenced by Salafism and the Muslim Brotherhood in his youth, before moving to Zaydism under the influence of his maternal grandfather, a Zaydi imam.

At the age of 14, he began to doubt his upbringing and religion, and became involved with the Yemeni Socialist Party. In an interview with The Jerusalem Post, he stated that he became an atheist by the age of 20. Many in his family were atheists, so he did not have to keep it a secret from them, but he did have to hide his views from the wider Yemeni society until moving to London in 2019.

== Involvement with Houthis ==
Al Bukhaiti became involved with the Houthis in 2008, when he was imprisoned by the Yemeni government for hosting a British-American journalist who was reporting on the group. They were arrested on their way to meet Abdul-Malik al-Houthi. In prison, he met some of the group's leaders, including Mohammed al-Houthi. After the Arab Spring, he was appointed as a spokesman for a general forum of revolutionary forces, including the Houthis. The Houthis granted him one of the seats allocated to them in the National Dialogue Conference in 2013, and became the Houthis' spokesman.

He began criticizing the Houthis for human rights violations and seizing people's homes in 2014, after they entered Sanaa, and resigned in 2015 after they stormed the home of former Yemeni president Abdrabbuh Mansur Hadi.

== Political views ==
Al Bukhaiti has said that he believes in a secular state in Yemen and civil rights, but lost faith that the Houthis would provide this after they took over Sanaa. He has criticized their vision as racist and sectarian. He advocates the overthrow of the Houthi regime, and has said that Israel could contribute to an international coalition to do so, similar to the US-led coalition against ISIS.

He has criticized Israel's policies towards the Palestinians, but says he is not hostile towards Israel as a people and a state. He has said that Israeli media is more accepting of different opinions than Arab media. In 2022, the Israeli Foreign Affairs Ministry made a Facebook post in Arabic, inviting him to visit. He has expressed interest in visiting, and said he wishes to apologize for the persecution and expulsion of Yemenite Jews in the 1950s.
