= Ali Shahalom =

English comedian and television presenter (born 1992)

- আলী শাহআলম
- Born: 15 October 1992 (age 33); Devon, England
- Education: University of Westminster
- Years active: 2010–present

YouTube information
- Channel: AliOfficialUK
- Years active: 2010–2016
- Subscribers: 61.7 thousand
- Views: 7.3 million
- Last updated: 27 March 2025

Ali Shahalom (Bengali: আলী শাহআলম; born 15 October 1992), also known by his stage name Ali Official, is an English comedian and television presenter of Bangladeshi descent.

== Early life ==
Shahalom was born in Devon, England. He studied drama and theatre at GCSE and A-level. He moved to London to study at university. He then went on to work as a Digital Marketing Assistant for Warner Bros.

== Career ==
Since April 2011, Shahalom and his younger brother, Shaheen (born in 2001), have hosted their channel on YouTube called Aliofficial1 with comedy sketches. Their comedy videos often relate to their Bengali heritage and culture, and have subsequently attracted a large South-Asian following.

In July 2013, Shahalom appeared on Channel 4's month-long documentary series, Ramadan Diaries. In 2014, he was featured in two episodes of the comedy web series Corner Shop Show. Since May of the same year, he has hosted The Variety Show on Channel S, broadcast live every fortnight on Saturday at 8.30 pm. In July 2015, he collaborated with Humza Arshad on episode 19 of Badman's World.

In October 2015, he performed on the "Sounds of Light" tour with musicians Safe Adam and Harris J. In December 2015, he went on a 20 city national tour with the comedy trio Allah Made Me Funny and Guz Khan. Throughout 2017, Ali worked with BBC to script and star in Snapchat content, which went on to win a Social Buzz Award and a Digiday Award. In February 2017, Ali made a special guest appearance on BBC One's musical show Let It Shine. In March 2017, Ali helped with the social media planning for Channel 4's documentary Extremely British Muslims. In April 2017, he did four shows across the United States. In May 2017, Ali performed at the West Yorkshire Playhouse for BBC Asian Network's Comedy Night.

== Recognition ==
In October 2016, Shahalom was named one of the "Young British Muslim Millennials Changing The World" by The Asian Today.

== See also ==
- British Bangladeshi
- List of British Bangladeshis
