= Ali Brown (businesswoman) =

American businesswoman

Ali Brown (born August 3, 1971) is an American entrepreneur business coach, author, speaker, and television commentator. She is the founder and CEO of Ali International LLC, an enterprise offering business and leadership coaching for women entrepreneurs. In 2009, Brown's company ranked #263 on the Inc. 500 list of fastest-growing private companies in the nation. In 2010, Brown was a recipient of the Enterprising Women of the Year award, and in April 2010 she was featured in the season finale of ABC's Secret Millionaire.

== Career ==
Brown was born in Stamford, Connecticut.

== Awards and recognition ==
- In 2009, Brown's company, Ali International, LLC, ranked #263 on the Inc. 500 list of fastest growing private companies in the nation.
- In 2010, Brown was a winner of the Enterprising Women of the Year award
- Included in the Ernst & Young 2010 Class of Entrepreneurial Winning Women
- Winner of the Stevie Award for Women Helping Women
- Recipient of the Commitment to Philanthropy award from the Step Up Women's Network
- Named "The Entrepreneurial Guru for Women" by Business News Daily
