= International Centre for Reconciliation =

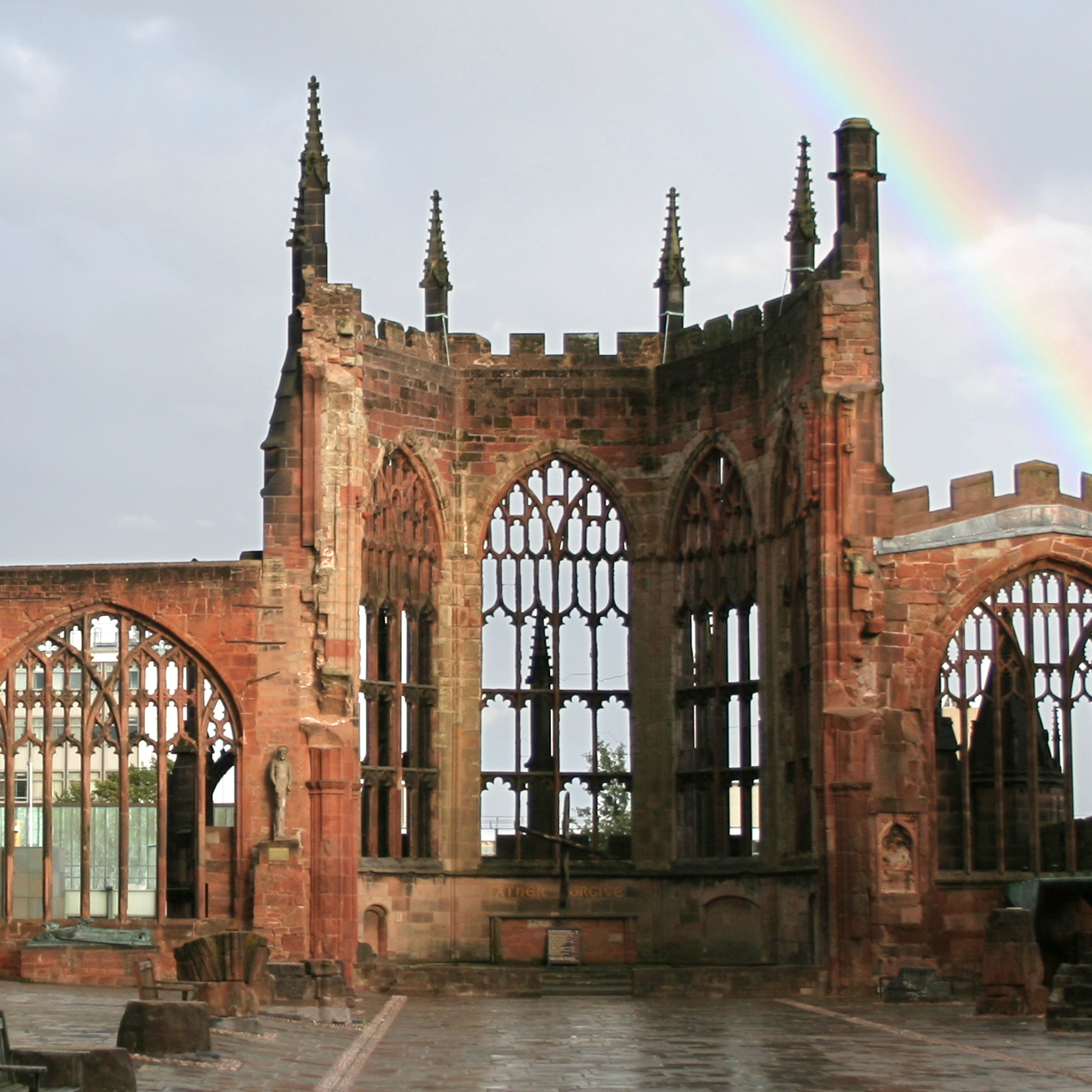
Coventry Cathedral ruins with rainbow

The International Centre for Reconciliation (or ICR) was based at Coventry Cathedral, UK, and was established in 1940 after the destruction of the cathedral in the Second World War. Rather than seek revenge for the devastation caused, the centre's founders vowed to promote reconciliation in areas of conflict. This began in the former Communist bloc, but has since broadened to focus on the conflict between the three major monotheistic faiths. In 2008, the ICR ceased to exist as an individual entity, and its work was taken on more closely by Coventry Cathedral under the Coventry Cathedral Reconciliation Ministry banner.

It was "committed to reconciliation in various situations of violent conflict, some related to religious dispute and others fuelled by different factors".

The ICR also co-ordinated the Community of the Cross of Nails, which is an international network of 150 organisations in 60 countries. All of these organisations aim for reconciliation, providing the ICR with a support base throughout the world. The centre has "formal partnerships" with the Anglican Diocese of Kaduna in Nigeria and the Syriac Orthodox Diocese of Jerusalem.

== Directors of International Ministry ==
This person in this position leads the ICR.

- The Revd. Canon Andrew White, Co-Director (1998-2004)
- The Revd. Canon Justin Welby, Co-Director and Canon Residentiary (2002-2005)
- Canon Dr Stephen Davis, Co-Director (2005-2006)
- Martin Hayward, Director of ICR (2007-2008)
- Canon David Porter, Director and Canon Residentiary (2008-2014)
- Dr Rev Canon Dr Sarah Hills MBChB MA PhD (2014)

White moved on to become vicar of St George's Church, Baghdad (Iraq) in 2005. St George's is the only Anglican church in Iraq.

Welby became Sub-Dean and Canon for Reconciliation Ministry at Coventry Cathedral in 2005; moved to become Dean of Liverpool as of December 2007 and Bishop of Durham as of November 2011. He was consecrated as the 105th Archbishop of Canterbury in March 2013. Davis became an Advisor to the President of Nigeria (2006) and Presidential Envoy (2007).
