= Ali Krasniqi =

Kosovar Romani writer and activist (1952–2024)

Ali Krasniqi (1952 – 1 December 2024) was a Kosovar Roma writer and activist, who came to prominence at the start of the Kosovo War. He was born in Caravadicë, Obiliq, Yugoslavia. He wrote in the Kurbet dialect. Krasniqi died on 3 December 2024, at the age of 72.
