= Ali Efe Yeğin =

Turkish motorcycle racer (born 1993)

- Nationality: Turkey
- Born: 31 August 1993 (age 33); Balıkesir, Turkey
- Bike number: 10

Ali Efe Yeğin (born 31 August 1993 in Balıkesir) is a Turkish professional motorcycle racer. He won the 2017 BMU European f600 championship. He competed in the European Superstock 1000 Championship in 2018 for Nutec - Benjan – Kawasaki Team on a Kawasaki Ninja ZX-10RR.

== Career ==
Yeğin is the holder of three national championship titles.

In 2016, Yeğin won the 2016 600cc rosbk Championship. The following year in 2017, he won the f600 BMU European championship, the 600cc Bulgaria national championship, the 600cc Romania national championship, and the Turkey fastest 600gp championship.

By October 2017, Yeğin mcompeted in the 11th and 12th rounds of the Balkan Motorcycle Union's BMU European Road Racing Championship held at the Serres Racing Circuit in Greece. He won the race in the F600 class. He won the 2016-2017 Turkey 600gp class championship race.

Supported by the World Supersport champion Kenan Sofuoğlu and his team Kawasaki Puccetti Racing, Yeğin was recruited by the Nutec - Benjan – Kawasaki Team by March 2018. He debuted as a professional internationally in the 2018 European Superstock 1000 Championship in MotorLand Aragón, Spain.

== Career statistics ==
=== Career highlights ===
- 2018 - 27th, European Superstock 1000 Championship, Kawasaki ZX-10R

=== European Superstock 1000 Championship ===
==== Races by year ====
(key) (Races in bold indicate pole position) (Races in italics indicate fastest lap)

Year	Bike	1	2	3	4	5	6	7	8	Pos	Pts
2018	Kawasaki	ARA; 16	NED; WD	IMO; DNQ	DON; DNQ	BRN; 13	MIS	ALG	MAG	27	3
