= Ali Ölmez =

Turkish footballer

Personal information
- Date of birth: August 21, 1983 (age 43)
- Place of birth: İzmir, Turkey
- Height: 1.88 m (6 ft 2 in)
- Position: Winger

Team information
- Current team: Buca Belediyespor

Senior career*
Years	Team	Apps	(Gls)
–2004	Altay	?	(?)
2004	Altınordu	13	(3)
2004–2006	Altay	?	(?)
2006–2009	Ankaragücü	15	(1)
2007	→ Adana Demirspor (loan)	14	(1)
2007–2008	→ Türk Telekom (loan)	16	(5)
2008–2009	→ Altay (loan)	11	(1)
2009–2010	Karabükspor	4	(0)
2010–2012	Elazığspor	34	(5)
2012	Altay	4	(0)
2012	Giresunspor	8	(0)
2013–2014	REO Atilla Spor	12	(0)
2014–	Buca Belediyespor	?	(?)
- * Club domestic league appearances and goals as of 6 September 2015

Ali Ölmez (born August 21, 1983) is a Turkish retired footballer. He played as a winger for Buca Belediyespor.
