= Imtiaz Ali (1990s cricketer) =

Trinidadian cricketer (born 1974)

Imtiaz Ali Jr.
Personal information
- Full name: Imtiaz Ali
- Born: 28 May 1974 (age 52)
- Height: 5 ft 10 in (1.78 m)
- Batting: Right-handed
- Bowling: Right-arm leg break
- Role: Bowler

Domestic team information
- Years: Team
- 1994: Trinidad and Tobago

Career statistics
Competition	LA
Matches	2
Runs scored	22
Batting average	11.00
100s/50s	0/0
Top score	14
Catches/stumpings	0/-
- Source: CricketArchive, 27 June 2013

Imtiaz Ali Jr. (born 28 May 1974) was a Trinidadian cricketer who played two matches for Trinidad and Tobago during the 1993–94 season. A right-handed batsman and occasional leg spinner, Imtiaz represented the country's under-19s team at both the 1992 and 1993 editions of the Northern Telecom Youth Championships. His two matches for the senior team were played at List A level, and came in late January and early February 1994, during that season's edition of the limited-overs Geddes Grant Shield. On debut against Guyana at Guaracara Park, Imtiaz scored 14 runs opening the batting with future West Indies player Suruj Ragoonath, before being run out. In his second and final match, played against Barbados at Queen's Park Oval, he batted lower in the order, scoring eight runs before again being run out. He is the son of former West Indian cricketer Imtiaz Ali Sr.
