= Ali Demić =

Bosnian basketball player

Free agent
- Position: Forward

Personal information
- Born: October 13, 1991 (age 35) Mostar, SR Bosnia and Herzegovina, SFR Yugoslavia
- Listed height: 6 ft 8 in (2.03 m)
- Listed weight: 212 lb (96 kg)

Career information
- NBA draft: 2013: undrafted
- Playing career: 2010–present

Career history
- 2010–2014: Bosna Royal
- 2014–2018: Zrinjski

Ali Demić (born October 13, 1991) is a Bosnian professional basketball player.

Standing at 6 ft 8 (2.03m) and weighing 212 lb (96 kg), he has started at the small forward and power forward positions.

== Career achievements ==
- Bosnian League champion: 1 (with Zrinjski: 2017–18)
