= John Train (investment advisor) =

American investment advisor and author (1928–2022)

- Born: John Pell Coster Train; May 25, 1928; New York City, U.S.
- Died: August 13, 2022 (aged 94); Rockport, Maine, U.S.
- Education: Groton School; Harvard University (B.A., M.A.)
- Occupations: Investment advisor; writer; editor; winemaker
- Spouse(s): Maria Teresa Cini di Pianzano (divorced) Francie Cheston (m. 1977)
- Children: 3
- Father: Arthur Train
- Military career
- Allegiance: United States
- Branch: United States Army

John Pell Coster Train (May 25, 1928 – August 13, 2022) was an American investment advisor and writer. He was a founding editor of The Paris Review.

== Early life ==
Train was born on the Upper East Side of Manhattan to Helen Coster Gerard and Arthur Train. His father was a district attorney in New York City and the author of the popular "Ephraim Tutt" stories that appeared in the Saturday Evening Post in the 1930s and 1940s. He graduated from Groton School in 1946. He graduated from Harvard University with a Bachelor of Arts in 1950 and a Master of Arts in 1951. He was editor of The Harvard Lampoon and president of the Signet Society. In 1953, he co-founded and became the first managing editor of The Paris Review, which won attention by publishing extended interviews with such authors as Ernest Hemingway, Thornton Wilder and William Faulkner.

== Career ==
Train served in the U.S. Army. After working in Wall Street, he founded the New York investment counsel firm now known as Train, Babcock Advisors. During this period, he became the principal owner of Château Malescasse, a Cru Bourgeois wine producer in Lamarque, Gironde in France. He was chairman of the Montrose Group, investment advisers and tax accountants, and was a director of a major emerging markets mutual fund. He was the founder-chairman of the Train Foundation, which since 2000 has annually awarded the Civil Courage Prize for "steadfast resistance to evil at great personal risk." The Prize was inspired by the career of Aleksander Solzhenitsyn, with whom Train once worked closely. Asked whether he would prefer to receive the prize, or have it named after him, or be a judge, Solzhenitsyn chose the last, which he did to the end of his life. The trustees and directors of the Civil Courage Prize include five ambassadors: American, English and South African. He was an overseer of the Whitehead School of Diplomacy and International Relations at Seton Hall University (affiliated with the United Nations), and was a member of the Council on Foreign Relations and the International Institute of Strategic Studies (London).

=== Presidential appointments ===
Train received part-time appointments from Presidents Ronald Reagan, George H. W. Bush and Bill Clinton as a director of government agencies and entities dealing with Africa, Asia, and Central Europe, respectively.

=== Other distinctions ===
Train had two decorations from the Italian government for humanitarian work, and was an officer of the (British) Order of St. John. In 1980, he helped to establish the Afghanistan Relief Committee to provide medicine and food to the victims of the Soviet invasion, serving first as its treasurer and later as president. The ARC merged with the International Rescue Committee, whose board he joined. He was an original trustee of the American University in Bulgaria.

== Personal life ==
Train was a descendant of an old New England family, he was a cousin of the late United States Senator Claiborne Pell, chairman of the Senate Foreign Relations Committee, and of Russell E. Train, head of the United States Environmental Protection Agency under Richard Nixon and a founding trustee/former chairman of the World Wildlife Fund. John Train's siblings include ambassadors, military officers and other officials.

Train married Maria Teresa Cini di Pianzano; they had two daughters and later divorced. In 1977, he married Francie Cheston. and had two more daughters. One of his children became an active member of his firm. Another daughter was married to Paul Klebnikov, a journalist murdered in Russia.

Train died on August 13, 2022, at a hospital in Rockport, Maine, aged 94.

== Select bibliography ==
Train wrote several hundred columns in The Wall Street Journal, Forbes, London's Financial Times, and other publications. Also, about 25 books, translated into many languages, including:

- Money Masters of Our Time (HarperCollins, ISBN 978-0-88730-970-0)
- Investing and Managing Trusts Under the New Prudent Investor Rule: A Guide for Trustees, Investment Advisors, & Lawyers (Harvard, ISBN 978-0-87584-861-7)
- The Craft of Investing (HarperCollins, ISBN 978-0-88730-626-6)
- The Midas Touch: The Strategies That Have Made Warren Buffett "America's Preeminent Investor" (HarperCollins, ISBN 978-0-06-015643-5)
- Dance of the Money Bees: A Professional Speaks Frankly on Investing (HarperCollins, ISBN 978-0-87034-145-8)
- The Olive: Tree of Civilization (M.T. Train/Scala Books, ISBN 978-1-85149-473-6)
- The Orange: Golden Joy (M.T. Train/Scala Books, ISBN 978-1-85149-525-2)
- Comfort Me With Apples (M.T. Train/Scala Books, ISBN 978-1-905377-27-5)

He has also written several humorous books, including John Train's Most Remarkable Names (which produced two sequels), Most Remarkable Occurrences, Wit: The Best Things Ever Said, Love, and others (mostly HarperCollins), all in the same format.
