= List of Iraqi medical doctors =

This is list of notable Iraqi medical doctors.

- Abd al-Latif al-Baghdadi
- Ahmed Shaker, endocrinologist, killed in Iraq after leaving his clinic in 2013
- Ala Bashir, plastic surgeon
- Hashim Al-Witry, Iraqi physician
- Imad Sarsam, orthopaedic surgeon
- Mohammed A.F. Al-Rawi, respiratory consultant, killed in Iraq 2003
- Nozad Saleh Rifaat, Iraqi kurdish general surgeon
- Omar Fakhri, Iraqi medical scientist
- Raad Shakir, Professor of Neurology at Imperial College London
- Saib Shawkat
- Salim Haim (1919–1983), dermatologist
