= Violence against academics in post-invasion Iraq =

Since the 2003 invasion of Iraq, Iraqi academics have frequently been threatened with violence, kidnapped, or murdered. Although it is impossible to determine the exact scale of the violence and intimidation, the Iraqi Ministry of Higher Education reported that over 3,250 academics had fled the country between February and August 2006. According to the Iraqi Association of University Lecturers about 300 academics, including Ph.D.'s working in Iraqi government ministries and university administrators, had been killed before January, 2007. Other, less reliable, sources have placed the death toll as low as 20 and as high as 1,000.

Prof. Mohammed A.F. Al-Rawi, a medical specialist, FRCS and president of Baghdad University, was killed in his clinic, in front of his wife and patients, on July 27, 2003. Prof. Abdul-Latif Ali al-Mayah, a humanities professor born in Basra, who had been chairman of the Arab World Research and Studies Centre at Mustansiriya University, head of the Baghdad Center for Human Rights, and had been an outspoken critic of the Iraq Interim Governing Council, was assassinated on January 19, 2004. Dr Imad Sarsam was a highly reputed Iraqi orthopaedic surgeon, FRCS, teaching at the Department of Orthopedics in Baghdad University and assistant professor at the Baghdad Medical College. He was assassinated on August 31, 2004, just three months after his participation in an international conference of shoulder and elbow surgeons in Washington, D.C. Dr Wissam S. al-Hashimi, a geologist born in Baghdad, was not only elected president of the Geological Society of Iraq in 2001, but he was also president of the Union of Arab Geologists and from 1996 to 2002 he was vice president of the International Union of Geological Sciences. He was killed in late August/early September 2004 after having been kidnapped, despite a ransom having been paid to the kidnappers.

One of the earliest reports on this violence was Robert Fisk's report in July 2004. Fisk stated that "university staff suspect that there is a campaign to strip Iraq of its academics, to complete the destruction of Iraq's cultural identity which began when the American army entered Baghdad." The violence became the subject of an international appeal by the BRussells Tribunal in January 2006. The BRussells Tribunal continues to collect information on the subject. It listed 472 killed academics as of September 2012 and 79 threatened academics as of October 2007.

Little is known about the group or groups responsible for the attacks. The BRussells Tribunal states that "Not one individual has been apprehended in connection with these assassinations." Various hypotheses that have been claimed for the attacks include a systematic attempt by Iraqi non-state armed opposition groups (Sunni and Shi'ite), or Kuwaiti or Israeli secret services to decimate Iraq's intelligentsia. The BRussells Tribunal takes no position on attributing blame for the violence, stating that "The wave of assassinations appears non-partisan and non-sectarian, targeting women as well as men, and is countrywide."

The extent of the violence against academics has prompted fears of a brain drain in Iraq of those academics who are not killed. According to UN Educational, Scientific and Cultural Organization director-general Koïchiro Matsuura: "By targeting those who hold the keys of Iraq's reconstruction and development, the perpetrators of this violence are jeopardizing the future of Iraq and of democracy."

The BRussells Tribunal has called for an independent investigation by the UN Special Rapporteur on summary executions at UNHCHR in Geneva.
