= Hashim Al-Witry =

Iraqi physician and author (1893–1961)

Sayyid Dr. Hashim Al-Witry FRCP
- هاشم الوتري
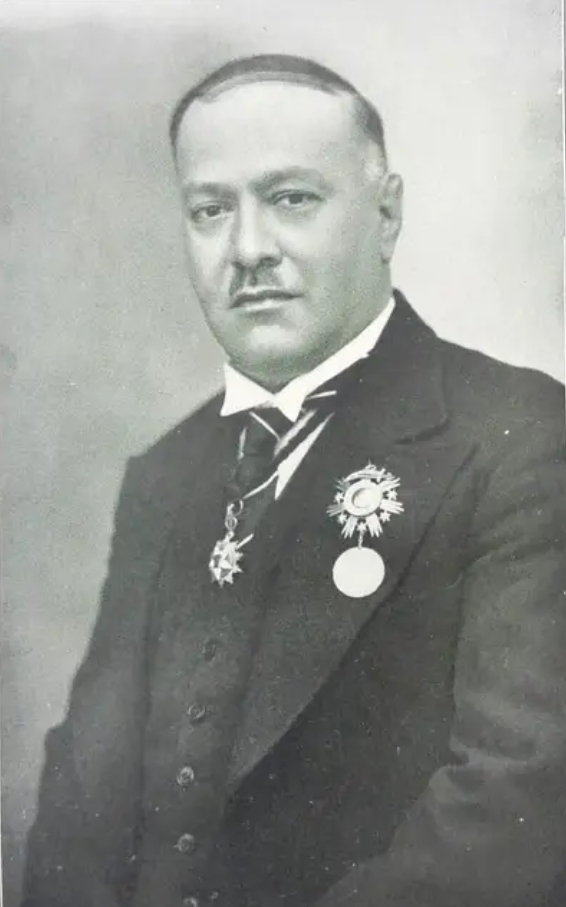

4th Dean of the Royal Iraqi College of Medicine
- In office November 1937 – November 1939
- Preceded by: Ahmed Kadri
- Succeeded by: Saib Shawkat
- In office June 1941 – December 1942
- Preceded by: Saib Shawkat
- Succeeded by: Harry Sinderson
- In office June 1946 – February 1953
- Preceded by: Harry Sinderson
- Succeeded by: Jalal Al-Azzawi

President of the Iraq Academy
- In office 1938
- In office 1943–1953

President of Bayt Al-Hikma
- In office 1953–1958

Personal details
- Born: 1893 Baghdad Vilayet
- Died: 17 January 1961 (aged 67–68) Baghdad, Kingdom of Iraq
- Citizenship: Kingdom of Iraq
- Education: Imperial School of Medicine
- Known for: Establishing medical education in Iraq.
- Awards: Fellow of the Royal College of Physicians (1948)
- Nickname: Shaikh of Physicians
- Medical career
- Profession: Physician, professor, researcher
- Field: Clinical Medicine
- Institutions: Royal Iraqi Hospital. Royal Iraqi College of Medicine. Journal of the Faculty of Medicine of Iraq. Iraqi Medical Research Institute.
- Research: Neurology and internal medicine
- Military career
- Allegiance: Ottoman Empire
- Service years: 1919–1920
- Rank: Captain

Sayyid Hashim Al-Witry M.D. (1893 – 17 January 1961) (Arabic: الاستاذ الدكتور السيد هاشم الوِتْرِي) was an Iraqi physician and author born in Baghdad. He was one of the founders of the Royal College of Medicine of Iraq in which he worked in as a professor and dean. He was a key contributor to the establishment of the Iraq Academy, of which he was vice president then president for two periods: 1938; and 1943 to 1953. He was an elected member of the Iraqi Academy of Science and a second Vice President to the academy. He also re-established the House of Wisdom "Bayt Al-Hikma, Scientific institution intellectual" and was its president from 1953 to 1958.

== Background ==
Sayyid Hashim Al-Witry was born in Baghdad in 1983 into a family of a noble Alids descend and Hashemites lineage known by "House of Al-Witry" (Arabic: آل ألوتري), therefore inheriting him the honourable title "Sayyid" and its corresponding "Sharif" He used this honorific title on most of his paperwork and documentation.

His father was Sayyid Yahya Al-Witry, scholar and Judge in Baghdad, he had a council in Al-Khulafa Mosque known by "House of Al-Witry Council" (Arabic: مجلس آل ألوتري) which he led until his death in 1922; it was then led by his son Sayyid Mahmoud Al-Witry who died in 1947 and was subsequently led by Hashim Al-Witry.

Sayyid Hashim Al-Witry completed his secondary education locally; since the Middle East was under the occupation of the Ottoman Empire, he proceeded for his medical education to Istanbul and he graduated from the Imperial School of Medicine in 1918, currently known as the Haydarpaşa Campus of Marmara University and commissioned as a captain in the medical service.

== Career ==
For a short while, Al-Witry worked as a physician in hospitals in Istanbul. After his graduation and in 1919, he went to Syria and worked as a captain in charge of the medical group sent to Mecca.

=== Early experience ===
After the dissolution of the Ottoman Empire and the establishment of the Iraqi Monarchy he returned to Iraq and joined the cadre of physicians of the Royal Iraqi Hospital in 1920. In 1925 he became in charge of the department of Internal Medicine until his retirement in 1959. He also established the first department of neuropathology within the hospital, and was also a delegate of the Iraqi International Society of Internal Medicine.

=== Royal College of Medicine of Iraq ===
Al-Witry played a prominent part at establishing the first medical college in Iraq, he founded the Royal College of Medicine of Iraq in 1927, alongside Sir Harry C. Sinderson Pasha (1891–1974) and was the dean of the faculty for many years. He also founded the Journal of the Faculty of Medicine of Iraq in 1936 and remained its chief editor until his death.

In 1943 he announced the establishment of higher specialised academic education within the college and providing higher qualifications i.e. MD, MS in general operation and PhD in main science.

== Honouring ==
In 1949, Al-Witry was elected to be a fellow of the Royal College of Physicians, under a unique regulation that only members of the college who have distinguished themselves in the practice of medicine, or in the pursuit of General Science or Literature. The Iraq Academy hosted a ceremony honouring his achievement and among the invitees was the prominent poet Muhammad Mahdi al-Jawahiri who recited a panegyric for al-Witri and praised his knowledge, his care for patience, and patriotic stances.

== Publications and researches ==
Alongside his educational and medical career, Al-Witry researched and publishing many books and articles related to medical studies involving first aid, clinical medicine, neurology, medicine history in Iraq, most of them are still being used in the medical teaching in Iraq; among his publication are as follows:

Publications
#	Title in English	Title in Arabic	Date	City
1	Neurological diseases	الأمراض العصبية	1945	Baghdad
2	Kidney disease	الأمراض الكلوية	1943	Baghdad
3	The history of medicine in Iraq with the emergence and progress of the Royal Iraqi Medical College	تاريخ الطب في العراق مع نشوء وتقدم الكلية الطبية الملكية العراقية	1939	Baghdad
4	First Aid Lessons	دروس الأسعافات ألطبية ألأولية	1928	Baghdad
5	Clinical medicine lectures	محاضرات في الطب السريري	1945	Baghdad
6	Glossary of medical terms	معجم المصطلحات الطبية	1941	Baghdad
7	Articles in ancient Arabic medicine	مقالات في الطب العربي القديم	1955	Baghdad
8	Summary of the book studies in the renal blood cycle	ملخص كتاب الدراسات في دورة الكلية الدموية	1952	Baghdad
9	Health services in Iraq	الخدمات الصحية في العراق	1944	Baghdad

== Personal life ==
He married Sharifa Al-Witry and had a son named Saad Al-Witry, a neurosurgeon who graduated from the Royal Iraqi College of Medicine in 1956 and founded the first neurosurgery department in Iraq in 1970.

Al-Witry died on 17 January 1961. He was buried in Ghazali Cemetery.
