= SAIB =

SAIB or Saib or Saïb may refer to:

- Sucrose acetate isobutyrate, an emulsifier, used as an additive in food and cosmetics
- Swedish Accident Investigation Board, now the Swedish Accident Investigation Authority
- Swiss Accident Investigation Board, now the Swiss Transportation Safety Investigation Board

People
Saib is an Arabic male given name

- Saib Tabrizi (1601/2–1677), Persian poet
- Saib Shawkat, Arab nationalist in the 20th century
- Moussa Saïb (born 1969), Algerian football manager and former player
