= Jala Makhzoumi =

Iraqi landscape architect

- جالا مخزومي (Arabic)
- Born: 1949 (age 76–77); Baghdad, Iraq
- Education: University of Baghdad; Yale University; University of Sheffield
- Occupations: Academic; landscape architect

Jala Makhzoumi (Arabic: جالا مخزومي; born 1949) is an Iraqi landscape architect, academic, and activist. She taught architecture and landscape for 15 years at the University of Technology in Baghdad. Makhzoumi helped found the Landscape Design and Ecosystem Management program at the American University of Beirut, where she serves as an adjunct professor. Her research includes landscape design, sustainable urban greenery, and post‑war recovery strategies. She has co‑authored several books, including Ecological Landscape Design and Planning: The Mediterranean Context and The Right to Landscape, which examine landscape and human rights. In 2023, she was elected vice president of the International Federation of Landscape Architects (IFLA). She is president of the IFLA Middle East Chapter. Makhzoumi is also a co‑founder of UNIT44, a Lebanon‑based design and planning practice in landscape architecture and urban design.

== Early life and education ==
Makhzoumi was born in Iraq in 1949 to an Iraqi Kurdish mother and an Iraqi Arab father who was born and raised in Lebanon. She grew up in Baghdad and spent summers in Dhour El Choueir, Lebanon. In 1971, she enrolled in the Faculty of Engineering at the University of Baghdad to study architecture. After graduation, she moved to the United States to attend Yale University, where she received a master's degree in environmental design.

== Research, career, and activism ==
After graduating from Yale, Makhzoumi returned to Baghdad, where she taught environmental sciences at the University of Technology for 15 years. During this period, she researched the intersection of ecology and landscape, focusing on vernacular settlements and practices used by local Iraqi communities. The Iran–Iraq War limited her ability to travel, and the first Gulf War of 1990 forced her to relocate from Iraq. After relocating, she pursued a PhD at the University of Sheffield and completed her dissertation in landscape architecture.

While in the United Kingdom, Makhzoumi developed a method for ecological landscaping and applied it in the context of Northern Cyprus. She collaborated with Gloria Pungetti, an Italian scholar and landscape architect. Their collaboration led to two co‑authored books: Ecological Landscape Design and Planning (1999) and The Right to Landscape (2016). In 2001, Makhzoumi joined the American University of Beirut (AUB), where she co‑founded the Landscape Design and Ecosystem Management program, serving as both professor and program coordinator from 2001 to 2007.

Makhzoumi was involved with the “AREC Rural Technology Park: Climate Change and Sustainable Livelihoods in Lebanon” project.

While in Lebanon, she worked with a team from AUB to revive the Erbil Inner Green Project, however AUB did not proceed with the project, possibly for security reasons. In the proposal for the Erbil Inner Greenbelt, AUB aimed to curb the city’s expansion, limit urban development, enhance the local microclimate, and provide a recreational landscape for residents.

Makhzoumi has participated in efforts to designate Dalieh of Raouche as a public space for local communities in Beirut after the Civil War as well as in protests against its private development.

== See also ==
- List of Iraqi architects
- List of women architects
