= Muhammad N. S. Hadi =

Australian civil engineering academic

- Occupations: Civil engineer and an academic

Academic background
- Education: B.Sc. (Hons) Civil Engineering; M.Sc. Structural Engineering; Ph.D. Structural Engineering
- Alma mater: University of Baghdad, Iraq; University of Leeds, UK
- Thesis: Calculation processing: a system for the manipulation of engineering design calculations (1989)
- Doctoral advisor: Alastair Watson

Academic work
- Institutions: University of Wollongong, Australia

Muhammad N. S. Hadi is an Iraqi Australian civil engineer and an academic. He is a professor of engineering at the School of Civil, Mining, Environmental, and Architectural Engineering, University of Wollongong.

Hadi has conducted research on concrete structures and fiber-reinforced polymers (FRP). He has co-authored three textbooks, including Nonlinear Analysis of Concrete-Filled Steel Tubular Columns and Concrete-Filled Stainless Steel Tubular Columns.

Hadi's work has been cited 9,600 times according to Scopus.

== Education and career ==
Hadi earned his B.Sc. (Hons) in Civil Engineering and his M.Sc. in Structural Engineering from the University of Baghdad, Iraq in 1977 and 1980, respectively. Between 1975 and 1984, he worked at the Rafidain Engineering Laboratory, the Air Force during his military service, and the Al-Mustansiriya Consultancy Bureau in Baghdad. He went on to complete his Ph.D. in Structural Engineering from the University of Leeds in 1989.

Hadi began his academic career as a lecturer at the Department of Civil Engineering at the University of Technology in Baghdad in 1985, a position he held until 1992. Between 1993 and 1994, he worked as a research assistant at the University of South Australia before joining the University of Wollongong as a lecturer in 1994, later becoming senior lecturer in 1999, associate professor in 2004 and professor in 2022.

== Research ==
Hadi has studied the application of materials in construction, with emphasis on material performance, enhancement, and optimization. His research in high-strength concrete investigated the behavior of externally reinforced high-strength concrete columns when subjected to eccentric loading and evaluated its effectiveness within external confinement with FRP composites. In other research, he calculated the optimum design of beams under different loadings using neural networks and showed that neural networks are comparatively effective for solving a vast number of structural engineering problems.

In his later work, Hadi employed the Taguchi method to find the best mix for geopolymer concrete, using ground granulated blast furnace slag (GGBFS) as a substitute for regular cement. He subsequently demonstrated that the setting time improved with the addition of metakaolin and silica fume. In related research, he investigated different factors affecting the strength, setting time, and workability of geopolymer pastes and after testing different mixes, found that the best mix consisted of 40% of GGBFS, 0.5 of Al/Bi ratio, 2.0 of SS/SH ratio, and an Aw/Bi ratio of 0.15.

Hadi's work has been cited 9,600 times according to Scopus.

Hadi has worked on research projects funded by the Australian Research Council (ARC), the National Natural Science Foundation of China and the China Pakistan Economic Corridor (CPEC) Collaborative Research Grant Program.

In 2025, he was part of the research team for the ARC Linkage Project 2D electromagnetic Hopkinson appartus for multi-axial dymatic testing (E25010089) which received A$420,000 in funding.

From 2022 to 2025 he worked on a project funded by the National Science Foundation of China on the mechaninal Properties and calculation methods of concrete beams strengthened with magnesium phosphate cement composties and fibre- renforced poylmer (FRP). The project received US$125,000 in Funding.

== Awards and honors ==
- 2005 – Fellowship, American Society of Civil Engineers
- 2005 – Fellowship, Engineers Australia
- 2016 – Honorary Adjunct Professor, Ton Duc Thang University, Vietnam
- 2024 – Fellowship, The Institute of Concrete Technology
- Life Member, the Australasian Slag Association (ASA).

== Bibliography ==
=== Books ===
- Nonlinear Analysis of Concrete-Filled Steel Tubular Columns. 2015. ISBN 978-3-639-66536-9.
- Uz, Mehmet Eren; Hadi, Muhammad N. S. (2017). Earthquake Resistant Design of Buildings. CRC Press, Taylor & Francis. ISBN 978-0-8153-9172-2.
- Patel, Vipulkumar; Liang, Qing Quan; Hadi, Muhammad (2018). Concrete-Filled Stainless Steel Tubular Columns. CRC Press. ISBN 978-1-138-54366-9.

=== Selected articles ===
- Hadi, M. N.; Arfiadi, Y. (1998). "Optimum design of absorber for MDOF structures". Journal of Structural Engineering. 124 (11): 424–431. doi:10.1061/(ASCE)0733-9445(1998)124:11(1272).
- Hadi, M. N. S. (2006). "Behaviour of FRP wrapped normal strength concrete columns under eccentric loading". Composite Structures. 72 (4): 503–511. doi:10.1016/j.compstruct.2005.01.018.
- Hadi, M. N.; Karim, H.; Sheikh, M. N. (2016). "Experimental investigations on circular concrete columns reinforced with GFRP bars and helices under different loading conditions". Journal of Composites for Construction. 20 (4): 04016009. doi:10.1061/(ASCE)CC.1943-5614.0000670.
- Hadi, M. N.; Farhan, N. A.; Sheikh, M. N. (2017). "Design of geopolymer concrete with GGBFS at ambient curing condition using Taguchi method". Construction and Building Materials. 140: 424–431. doi:10.1016/j.conbuildmat.2017.02.131.
- Hadi, M. N.; Zhang, H.; Parkinson, S. (2019). "Optimum mix design of geopolymer pastes and concretes cured in ambient condition based on compressive strength, setting time and workability". Journal of Building Engineering. 23: 301–313. doi:10.1016/j.jobe.2019.02.006.
