= Raad Shakir =

Iraqi-British neurologist

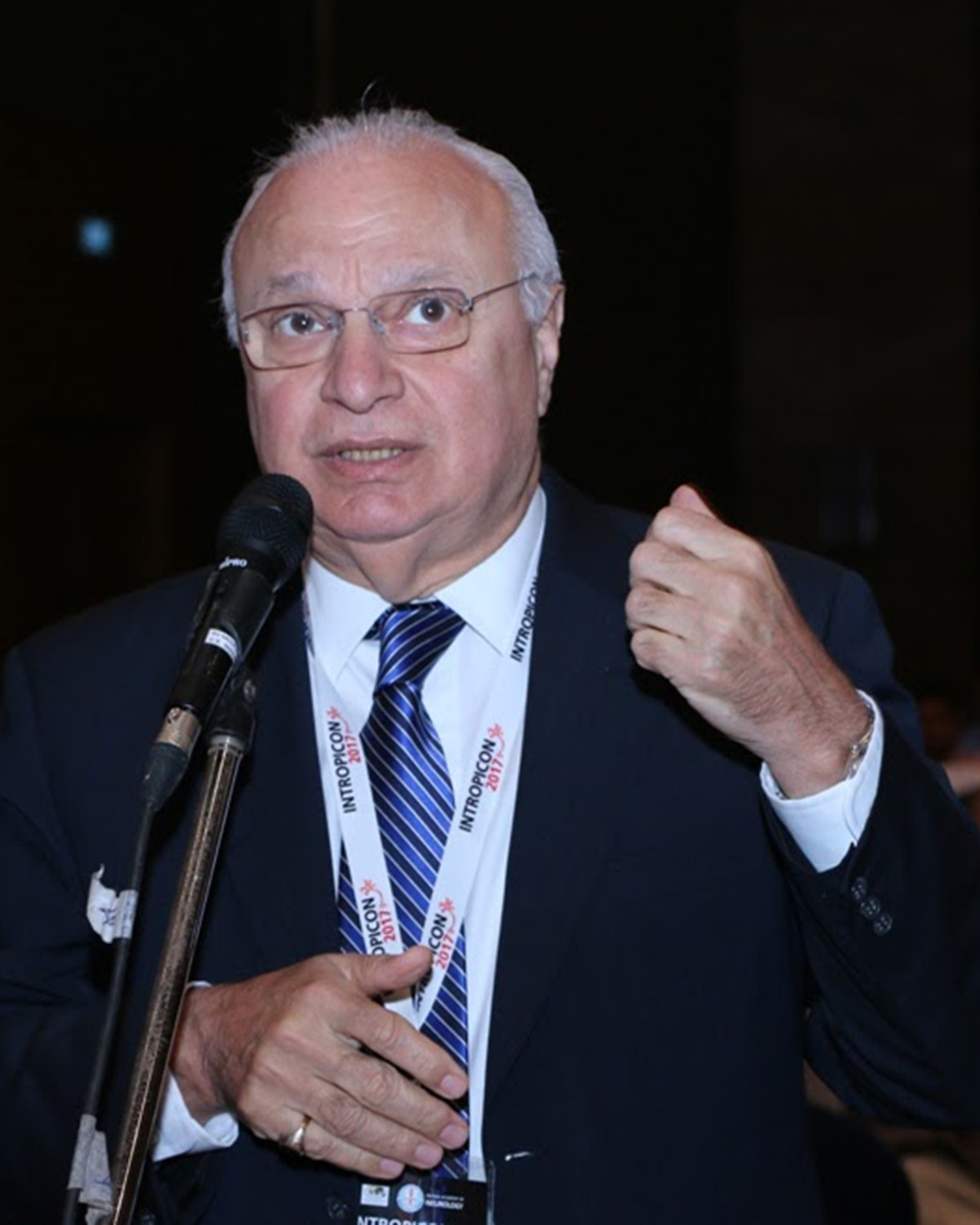
Prof. Raad Shakir CBE, MBChB, MSc, MRCP(UK), FRCP(Edin), FRCP(Glas), FRCP(Lon)

Raad Shakir CBE is Professor of Neurology at Imperial College London and a Consultant Neurologist at Charing Cross Hospital.

== Early life and education ==
Shakir was born on December 21, 1948, in Baghdad, Iraq. He graduated from the University of Baghdad. Then he moved to the United Kingdom in 1975 as a research fellow at Glasgow University, before completing his neurology training at the Institute of Neurological Sciences in Glasgow in 1979.

== Work ==
=== World Federation of Neurology ===
Shakir was Secretary-Treasurer General of the World Federation of Neurology in 2007. From 2014 to 2018, Shakir was president. His term in office is notable for his focus on regional organisations, supporting the establishment of the African Academy of Neurology in 2015, and the Pan American Federation of Neurological Societies (PAFNS) in Latin America, in 2016.

=== WHO, ICD-11 and stroke classification ===
The publication of ICD-7 in 1955 by the World Health Organization (WHO) classified cerebrovascular diseases as a disease of blood vessels and this included stroke. Respective data on mortality and morbidity were counted as vascular diseases similar to any vessel disease. This classification was in contrast to ischaemia of the gut, kidneys or eyes, which are classified as diseases of the affected organ. As stroke was classified as part of the vascular disease section of the ICD, its effects were reported with those of cardiac diseases. As an example, in data published in the WHO European Health Report 2012, stroke is nowhere to be seen. As a consequence, funding for neurological care was lost and governments were unaware of the scale of the problem.

In 2007, the WHO began its review of ICD-10 and the WHO Topic Advisory Group for Neurology was formed. Shakir was nominated in 2009 to chair the WHO Neurosciences Topic Advisory Group.

Between 2009 and 2019, Shakir's chaired the neurology Topic Advisory Group working with experts and organisations on cerebrovascular diseases and collaborating closely with the World Stroke Organization to produce the necessary scientific reasoning as to why cerebrovascular diseases should be moved to the nervous system disease chapter and obtain approval from the cardiology Topic Advisory Group. In a landmark decision the move was approved by the WHO Division of Informatics and Statistics. The new ICD-11 classification of diseases formally lists Stroke as a neurological disorder and not a disorder of the circulatory system and all Strokes are listed as a disease of the nervous system.

=== WHO and Neurology Atlas ===
Shakir was actively involved in the joint World Health Organization and World Federation of Neurology production of the Neurology Atlas. The data highlighted the large inequalities in income and resources across world regions and revealed that the available resources for neurological disorders within most countries were insufficient. The Atlas reinforced the need for substantial increases in neurology services and training.

=== Commander of the British Empire ===
Shakir was named a Commander of the British Empire (CBE) in the Queen's New Year Honours list 2021 for Services to Global Neurology

== Academic career and positions ==
- International baccalaureate, American Jesuit School, Baghad (1965)
- Bachelor of Medicine and Bachelor of Surgery, Medical College, Baghad (1971)
- Medical house officer, Medical City Teaching Hospital, Baghdad (1971 - 1972)
- Medical senior house officer, Medical City Teaching Hospital, Baghdad (1972 - 1974)
- Medical registrar neurology, Medical City Teaching Hospital, Baghdad (1974 - 1975)
- Research fellow, Glasgow University (1975 - 1977)
- Neurology registrar, Glasgow University (1977 - 1980)
- Membership of the Royal College of Physicians, Royal College Physicians (1979)
- Assistant professor, Kuwait University, Kuwait (1980 - 1984)
- Associate professor, Kuwait Medical School (1984 - 1986)
- Lecturer, Harvard Medical School, Massachusetts General Hospital, Boston (1986 - 1987)
- Academic vice dean, Kuwait Medical School (1988 - 1990)
- Consultant neurologist, Charing Cross Hospital, London (1990 - )
- Chief of Service, Charing Cross Hospital (2005 - 2015)
- Senior lecturer, Imperial College School of Medicine (1990 - )

=== Key positions ===
- Associate Member, American Academy of Neurology (1984 - )
- Member, American Academy of Clinical Neurophysiology (1986 - )
- Regional Royal Colleges of Physicians (RCP) advisor for Neurology, Northwest Thames London, and examiner for the MRCP London (1992 - )
- Secretary-Treasurer General, World Federation of Neurology (2007 – 2014)
- President, World Federation of Neurology (2014 - 2017)
- Chair, WHO Topic Advisory Group, Nervous System Disorders, ICD11 (2009 - 2019)
- President of the South of England Neurosciences Association (SENA) (2018 - )
- EAN WHO representative (2019 - )
- Fellow American Academy of Neurology
- President, The Joint Neurosciences Council (2025-2027)

=== Honorary positions ===
- Honorary Fellow European Academy of Neurology
- Honorary Fellow Japanese Society of Neurology
- Honorary Fellow Indian Academy of Neurology
- Honorary Fellow Sri Lankan Academy of Neurology
- Honorary Member of EAN

=== Journal editor ===
- CONTINUUM (American Academy of Neurology, CNS INFECTIONS)
- Co-editor, Neurological Infections & Epidemiology (1995 - 1998)
- Associate editor, Journal of Tropical and Geographical Neurology (1990 - 1992)
- Editor (clinical), Medical Principles and Practice (1988 - 1990)
- Editor, Journal of the Kuwait Medical Association (1984 - 1988)

=== Journal reviewer ===
- Journal of Neurology, Neurosurgery and Psychiatry
- Journal of Neurology
- BRAIN
- Clinical Neurology and Neurosurgery
- Journal of Infection
- Transactions of The Royal Society of Tropical Medicine and Hygiene
- Saudi Medical Journal.

== Publications ==
- Tropical Neurology (1996)
- Tropical Neurology (2003)
- Published papers
