= Ali Al-Ghurairi =

Iraqi army general

General Ali Al-Ghurairi
- علي جاسم محمد رجب الغريري
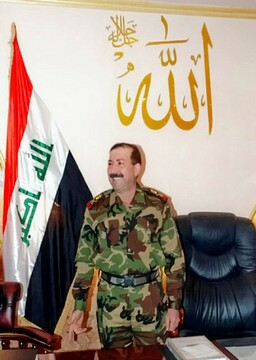
- This photo was taken in 2008. It shows Director-General staff Major General Ali Al-Ghurairi at the Karbala Police General Directorate.
- Born: Ali Jassim Mohammad Rijab Al-Ghurairi; 1961 (age 64–65); Baghdad
- Education: University of Baghdad, College of Sciences - Department of Physics; First Military College; * University of Defense for Higher Military Education: -Joint Staff College -War College -Command College: Norwegian Military Academy Basic Leadership courses; Joint Warfare Centre; College of Law
- Military career
- Allegiance: Iraq
- Branch: Ministry of Defence (Iraq): Army; Ministry of Interior (Iraq): Police
- Service years: 1980–present
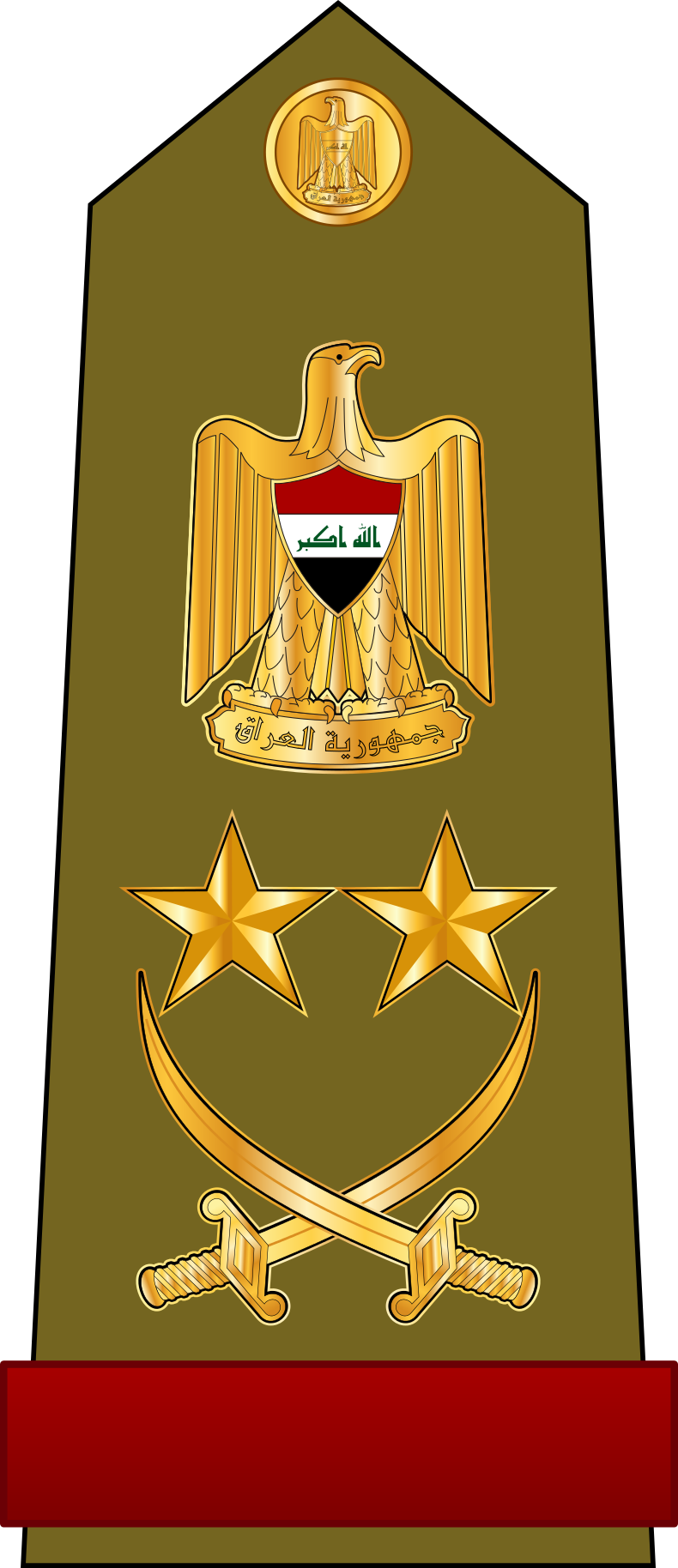
- Rank: General
- Commands: Baghdad Police Command; Iraqi Federal Police Command; Iraqi Southern Region Customs and Border Protection Command; Holy Karbala Governorate Police Forces Command
- Conflicts: ISIS war; Second Battle of Tikrit
- Awards: Medal of Courage; Medal of High Merit
- Website: algreyri.com

Ali Al-Ghurairi (Arabic: علي الغريري) is an Iraqi army general, commanding general, and chief of police, who currently serves as Director-General Commander of Police of the capital Baghdad. He has a jurist JD degree in law. He previously served as the Chief of staff of the Iraqi Federal Police Forces Command, Director-General of Directorate of Recruitment Management in Ministry Of Defense, Director of the administrative affairs of the Joint Staff, Director of Training in MOD, Director of Administration in MOD, and Deputy of the Higher Institute for Security and Administrative Development under the Ministry of Interior MOI, Minister's Office.

== Early life and education ==
Al Ghurairi graduated from the first military college in 1980 in Baghdad. He did a bachelor's in law, a master's in military service, and a Ph.D. in war studies.

== Career ==
Al Ghurairi, during his diversified military career, handled several offices and assumed multiple positions. Initially, he was appointed as a Director-General of the Directorate of Recruitment Management in the Ministry Of Defense. After that, he was promoted to the post of Director of Training in MOD. In 2004, Ghurairi became the Director of Administration in MOD.

In 2007, Al Ghurairi was appointed by the Prime Minister Commander in Chief at the Ministry of Interior as Director-General Commander of Holy Karbala’ Governorate Police Forces where he handled several duties such as reinforcement of law, security, and order.

Later, Al Ghurairi was appointed as a Director and Commander of Customs and Border Protection of the Iraqi Southern Region Headquarters in Basra. Soon he became the Chief of Staff of Iraqi Federal Police Forces Command, then Director-General Commander of the Iraqi Federal Police Forces for a two weeks, then Presently, Al Ghurairi is Director-General Commander of Police of the capital Baghdad, Iraq.

Al Ghurairi was also a Member of the Iraqi National Reconciliation Committee back in 2007. Additionally, he was promoted to staff Major General in 2006 in MOD.

AL Ghurairi has held the position of Deputy of the Higher Institute for Security and Administrative Development under the Ministry of Interior MOI, Minister's Office, since 2022.

== Awards ==
Al Ghurairi has received many certificates of appreciation as well as several medals of courage and medals of high merit in his career as a Commander.
