= Mohammed A.F. Al-Rawi =

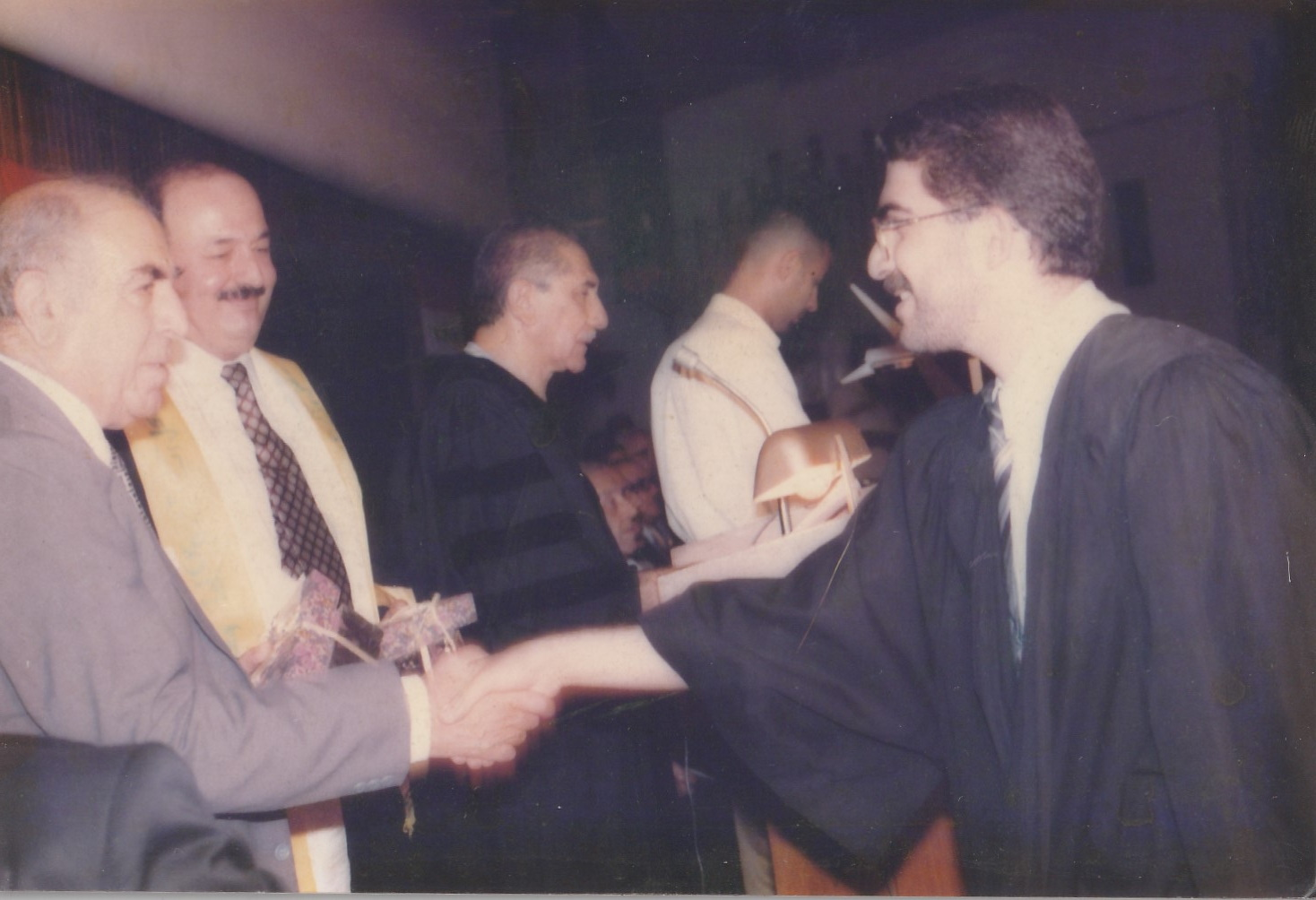
Professor Mohammed Al-Rawi (2nd left) and Professor Aziz Mahmood Shukri. At Al-Bakir Hall, Baghdad College of Medicine, June 30, 2000.

Mohammed A. F. Al-Rawi (1952 - 2003) was an Iraqi medical specialist/physician, the president of Baghdad University, the chairman of the Iraqi Doctors Union, and the former dean of College of Medicine University of Baghdad at the time of his death. Following the 2003 invasion of Iraq, Al-Rawi was reinstated as president of Baghdad University by US Deputy Proconsul Robin Raphel in May 2003 but he opted not to serve in this position while the country was under foreign control.

== Academic qualifications and career ==
Al-Rawi was a professor at Baghdad University College of Medicine. He gained the UK MRCP degree in medicine. He was a member of the Arab Board of Medicine and a member of the Iraqi Board of Medicine.

== Medical school and postgraduate years ==
Al-Rawi entered Baghdad University College of Medicine in September 1971. Although he was already a full member in the Ba'ath party, he kept a low political profile initially.

He worked closely with the Students Union (National Union of Iraqi Student, NUIS).

After graduation with M.B.Ch.B. in 1977, he became a lecturer in physiology in Baghdad University College of Medicine. Al-Rawi was sent to the UK to achieve the MRCP degree. With him, there were several other newly graduated doctors.

== Circumstances of death ==
Al-Rawi was killed in his clinic soon after the U.S. invasion. Reports from various secondary sources state that he was assassinated for his political views.

== See also ==
- Violence against academics in post-invasion Iraq
