= Abdul-Latif Ali al-Mayah =

Abdul-Latif Ali al-Mayah (1949 or 1950 – January 19, 2004) was a humanities professor born in Basra, who became chairman of the Arab World Research and Studies Centre at Mustansiriya University and head of the Baghdad Centre for Human Rights. He was an outspoken critic of the Iraq Interim Governing Council, which was the provisional government of Iraq from 2003 to 2004, established by the US-led multinational coalition occupying Iraq, following the 2003 Invasion of Iraq. He was assassinated on January 19, 2004.

== Academic career ==
Abdul-Latif Ali al-Mayah taught the politics of the Arab region, and became the head of the Arab World Research and Studies Centre of Mustansiriya University. Students and colleagues said that he was an enthusiastic teacher and that he used his own money to buy computers for his classroom.

== Political positions ==
Abdul-Latif Ali al-Mayah was for some time a low-level member of the Ba'ath Party. He voluntarily quit the party in 1991 due to dissatisfaction with it. He believed in the original Ba'ath ideal of Arab unity, but not in the way the Ba'ath Party was implementing this.

While Saddam Hussein remained in power as president of Iraq, Al-Mayah called for elections. Because of this, he was imprisoned. He was released from prison, partly because one of his former students was one of the interrogators.

Following the 2003 US invasion of Iraq, al-Mayah was against both the occupation and the previous dictatorship.

According to Talal Nathan al-Zuhary, director of the Mustansiriya University library, al-Mayah believed that "one day he would be bumped off by the Mossad or the CIA" and that "More recently [following the invasion], he was more worried about the looters who came after the regime fell and stole so much."

Al-Mayah became well known as a human rights and pro-democracy campaigner.

On the evening of January 18, 2004, on the television channel al-Jazeera, he had criticised what he called the corruption of the Iraqi Governing Council (IGC), appointed by the US authorities, and demanded universal elections as soon as possible, as had earlier done during the presidency of Saddam Hussein. He is quoted as saying, "I can endure any Iraqi government, but the feeling of being under occupation is terrible for me."

Since US authorities were planning a caucus system for choosing a new government rather than representative democracy by all Iraqi adult citizens, al-Mayah's public declaration directly opposed United States policy in Iraq.

== Circumstances of death ==
On the morning of January 19, 2004, al-Mayah left his house at 8am and starting driving his car, with another professor, Sarhan Abbas, in the passenger seat. Due to the road shape and traffic, he slowed down the car, and passed an outdoor shish kebab restaurant, El Banouk (The Bank), which was just about to open for the day. About a hundred metres further on, he slowed the car again because of a large pothole. A group of seven or eight men with their faces concealed by red keffiyehs (headscarves) appeared from a side road. Al-Mayah thought they were carjackers and was ready to hand them the keys. The attackers then shot al-Mayah more than 20 times.

Al-Mayah's bodyguard, Mohamed Sahib, did not have a gun since he was still waiting for a gun licence from US authorities. Sahib stated, "They shouted for the car to stop... I remember one person fired directly at al-Mayah inside the car and I think another group also fired from the other side. He was shot three times in his head just as he was opening the car door to get out. He fell dead on to the ground."

== Speculation regarding death ==
A senior commander at the headquarters of the Iraqi police, who insisted on remaining anonymous in fear for his safety, told the New Statesman reporter, "You can look no further than the Governing Council (IGC). There are political parties in this city who are systematically killing people. They are politicians that are backed by the Americans and who arrived to Iraq from exile with a list of their enemies. I've seen these lists. They are killing people one by one."

Al-Mayah's brother told the New Statesman that his brother had received many emails advising him to "be less outspoken in his criticism of the IGC." At least one came from an IGC member. Al-Mayah's brother stated, "He never told me the name of this man, only that he was a dual national, someone who had come back from exile after the Americans invaded. He told me the man never actually threatened him. It was a sort of warning that it would be safer if he left the country. He was determined not to be swayed."

At al-Mayah's funeral procession, a banner alleged that "America and the Zionists" were responsible for his death.

One of al-Mayah's students, Salam Rais, supported the claim that a systematic campaign to kill Iraqi academics existed, stating "His assassination is part of a plan in this country, targeting any intellectual in this country, any free voice."

== Posthumous award ==
Al-Mayah was posthumously awarded the Train Foundation's Civil Courage Prize, which recognizes "extraordinary heroes of conscience".

== See also ==
- Violence against academics in post-invasion Iraq
- Pan-Arabism
