= Wissam S. al-Hashimi =

Iraqi geologist (1942–2005)

Wissam S. Al-Hashimi
- Known for: Secretary General of the Union of Arab Geologists & President of the Geological Society of Iraq

Dr. Wissam S. al-Hashimi (1942–2005) was an Iraqi geologist born in Baghdad. He was Secretary General of the Union of Arab Geologists until his death in 2005. In 2001 he was elected president of the Geological Society of Iraq and was president of the Union of Arab Geologists. From 1996 to 2002 he was vice president of the International Union of Geological Sciences (IUGS). He was killed in late August or early September 2005.

== Academic career ==
Wissam al-Hashimi received his B.Sc. degree in geology-physics from Baghdad University in 1965 and carried out his military service obligations. In 1967 he was employed as a demonstrator (tutor) in the University of Mosul. He did his Ph.D. at the University of Newcastle-upon-Tyne from 1968 to 1972, working on the sedimentology and dolomitization of the limestone member of the Carboniferous Middle Limestone Group of Northumberland, northeast England.

He returned to Baghdad and held a number of positions in the Iraqi government, the Iraqi National Oil Company, and the Iraq Ministry of Oil. He was appointed the head of the Arab Geologist Association's advisory committee from 1975, just after this was formed, until 1998. He was elected as secretary general 1973 and president 2001 of the Geological Society of Iraq. He was elected to the Council of the International Association of Sedimentologists, serving from 1982 to 1990. He was elected as vice-president of the International Union of Geological Sciences (IUGS) in 1996.

Wissam al-Hashimi wrote many scientific papers, in both Arabic and English, on carbonate sedimentology and diagenesis, petrology, mineralogy, geoarchaeology, engineering geology, underground storage, industrial rocks and minerals, and hydrology. He regularly wrote analytical articles which were published in Iraqi newspapers covering various political, oil and water issues in the Middle East and the Arab world.

== Circumstances of death ==
According to Wissam al-Hashimi's daughter Tara,

He was kidnapped early in the morning on August 15, 2005 while going to work, his recent papers were stolen. A ransom was given but unfortunately, he was shot twice in the head and died. ... As his ID was taken from him it took us about 2 weeks to find his body in one of Baghdad's hospitals.

== See also ==
- Violence against academics in post-invasion Iraq
