= Emad Zaki Yehya =

Doctor Emad Zaki Yehya
- عماد زكي يحيى
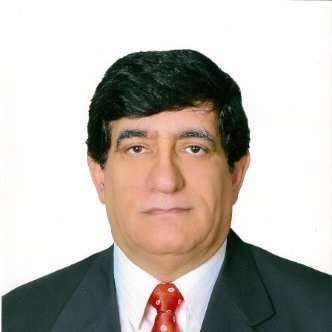
- Born: May 12, 1955; Baghdad, Iraq
- Died: August 3, 2016 (aged 61); Caracas, Venezuela
- Education: University of Baghdad
- Occupations: Petroleum consultant, author, professor, scholar
- Years active: 1977–2016
- Organization(s): Iraqi Ministry of Oil, PDVSA, SPE

Emad Zaki Yehya (May 12, 1955 – August 3, 2016) (Arabic:عماد زكي يحيى), was born in Baghdad. He was an Iraqi petroleum engineer, author, scholar, and a PhD lecturer at Simón Bolívar University in Caracas, Venezuela

== Biography ==
Dr. Yehya was born in Baghdad, Iraq on May 12, 1955 to parents from the northern part of Iraq of Mosul. He gained a B.S.M.E. in Petroleum Engineering, M.S.M.E., and PhD in Reservoir and Simulation at the University of Baghdad. He was fluent in Arabic, Spanish, and English.

Following his graduation from the University of Baghdad, he worked (1977-1980) as a petroleum engineer for the Northern Petroleum Organization in Kirkuk, Iraq. His work included training program and field assignment in well logging and well testing.

Dr. Yehya was the President of the Reservoir Engineering Department in the Ministry of Oil of Iraq, before leaving the country to head to Venezuela.

Dr. Yehya became an international face, while becoming part of SPE lecturer.

Dr. Yehya passed away in Caracas, Venezuela on August 3, 2016.

=== Education ===
- Bachelor of Science in Petroleum Engineering, University of Baghdad, 1977
- Master of Science in Reservoir Engineering, University of Baghdad, 1987
- PhD. in Reservoir Simulation, University of Baghdad, 1993

=== Career ===
- Head of Reservoir Department at the Ministry of Oil of Iraq, 1989
- Field Director for Al Rumayla Sector, 1980–86
- Head of the Technical Committee, 1999-2000
- Board of Advisers, Universidad Simon Bolivar

== Works ==
=== Authored ===
- Author of Reservoir Study of al-Rafidain oil Field, Simulation Model, RFDD 1997
- Author of A Study of Capillarity and Capillary hysteresis for Different Producing Units in Kirkuk Field, Iraq 1987
- Author of Characterization of Fractured Reservoirs using Simbest II model 1990
- Author of Reservoir Study of Kirkuk Field, Main limestone Reservoir, Part I, Simulation model, RFDD 1992
- Author of Applied Reservoir Engineering, Oil Training Institute, Iraq 1993
- Author of Reservoir Study of Kirkuk Field, Main limestone Reservoir, Part II, Simulation model, RFDD 1994
- Author of Reservoir Study of Risha Gas Field, Dubaidib Formation, Simulation model, NRA 1992
- Author of Single well study of well RH-26, Risha Gas Field, Simulation model, NRA 1993
- Author of Updating of the Reservoir Study of Risha Gas Field, Dubaidib Formation, Simulation model, NPC, Jordan 1998
- Author of Reservoir Study of al-Rafidain oil Field, Simulation model, RFDD 1997
- Author of The effect of Injection of dead oil in Kirkuk Oil Field during (1990- 1997), Simulation model, RFDD 1997
- Author of A full scale reservoir simulation study of Orocual Field, SJ-3 Fm., Compositional-Single porosity model, Intevep - PDVSA, Venezuela 1998
- Author of A simple cheap method to improve the paraffin oil production of San Joaquín field Intevep - PDVSA, Venezuela 1999
- Author of Calculation of the minimum required gas rate to lift water and condensate from Anaco wells, Intevep - PDVSA, Venezuela 2000
- Author of Improving the productivity of some gas condensate wells in Anaco area, Intevep - PDVSA, Venezuela 2000
- Author of Analysis of well test results of well Gun-1x, Intevep - PDVSA, Venezuela 2000
- Author of Using a Stochastic model to interpret well testing results of well Pag- 6E, Campo Pato, Intevep - PDVSA, Venezuela 2000
- Author of Plan de Explotación del proceso de DESINFLE. Arena L1U, yacimiento ZG-303, Intevep - PDVSA, Venezuela 2000
- Author of Reservoir management Plan of the Gas-Blow down Process (Desinfle), Intevep - PDVSA, Venezuela 2000
- Author of Modelo de Simulación de Producción, para Pozos Fracturados hidráulicamente en Yacimientos de Gas Condensado, Master dissertation, the university of Simon Bolivar 2002
- Author of Productivity Evaluation of a Vertical, a Horizontal and Hydraulically Fractured Well in a Gas Condensate Reservoir (Simulation-Comparison Study), Intevep - PDVSA, Venezuela 2003
- Author of A full scale reservoir simulation study of LIC Santa Rosa/San Juan and San Antonio reservoirs, Compositional-duel porosity model, Intevep - PDVSA, Venezuela 2003
- Author of Herramienta Sencilla de Simulacion Numerica desde el Yacimiento hasta el Tanque, Intevep - PDVSA, Venezuela 2004
- Author of Mejoramiento de la productividad de la formacion S5/ACEMA200 (en San Tome) atraves la perforacion de un pozo horizontal (simulation approach), Intevep 2004
- Author of Exploitation Strategy in the Development of Gas and Oil Mature Fields:Case Study Houston, OTC 2012
