= Al-Muthanna Club =

1935–1941 political party in Iraq

Al-Muthanna Club Nadi al-Muthanna
- Chairperson: Saib Shawkat
- Founded: 1935
- Dissolved: 1941
- Succeeded by: Iraqi Independence Party (not legal successor)
- Youth wing: Al-Futuwwa
- Ideology: Pan-Arabism; Arab fascism Arab nationalism Iraqi nationalism
- Political position: Far-right
- Colours: Black

The Al-Muthanna Club (Arabic: نادي المثنى) was an influential pan-Arab fascist society established in Baghdad ca. 1935 to 1937 which remained active until May 1941, when the coup d'état of pro-Nazi Rashid Ali al-Gaylani failed. It was named after Al-Muthanna ibn Haritha, an Iraqi Muslim Arab general who led forces that helped to defeat the Persian Sassanids at the Battle of al-Qādisiyyah. Later known as the Iraqi Independence Party, Nadi al-Muthanna was influenced by European fascism and controlled by radical Arab nationalists who, according to 2005's Memories of State, "formed the core of new radicals" for a combined Pan-Arab civilian and military coalition.

== Saib Shawkat ==
In 1938, as fascism in Iraq grew, Saib Shawkat, a known fascist and pan-Arab nationalist, was appointed director-general of education.

With co-founder:Taha al-Hashimi, Shawkat founded the al-Muthanna club in 1939, and the club remained under his guidance.

Under German ambassador Fritz Grobba's influence, The al-Muthanna club developed a youth organization, the al-Futuwwa, modeled on European fascist lines and on the Hitler Youth.

== Yunis al-Sabawi ==
Yunis al-Sabawi (يونس السبعاوي) (who translated Hitler's book Mein Kampf into Arabic in the early 1930s) was active in the al-Muthanna club and in the leadership of the al-Futuwwa. He was a deputy in the Iraqi government, minister of economics. Al-Sabawi had become anti-Semitic; on 1 and 2 June 1941, members of al-Muthanna and its youth organization led a mob that attacked Baghdad's Jewish community in a pogrom later named the Farhud. Two days before Farhud, Al-Sabawi, a government minister who proclaimed himself the governor of Baghdad, had summoned Rabbi Sasson Khaduri, the community leader, and recommended to him that Jews stay in their homes for the next three days as a protective measure. He had planned for a larger massacre, planning to broadcast a call for the Baghdad public to massacre Jews. However, the broadcast was never made since al-Sabawi was forced to flee the country.

After the British overthrew the coup government, Sabawi was court-martialed for the mutiny, sentenced to death, and hanged on 5 May 1942.

== See also ==
- Mohammad Amin al-Husayni
- Rashid Ali
