= Ali Aldabbagh =

Iraqi politician (born 1955)

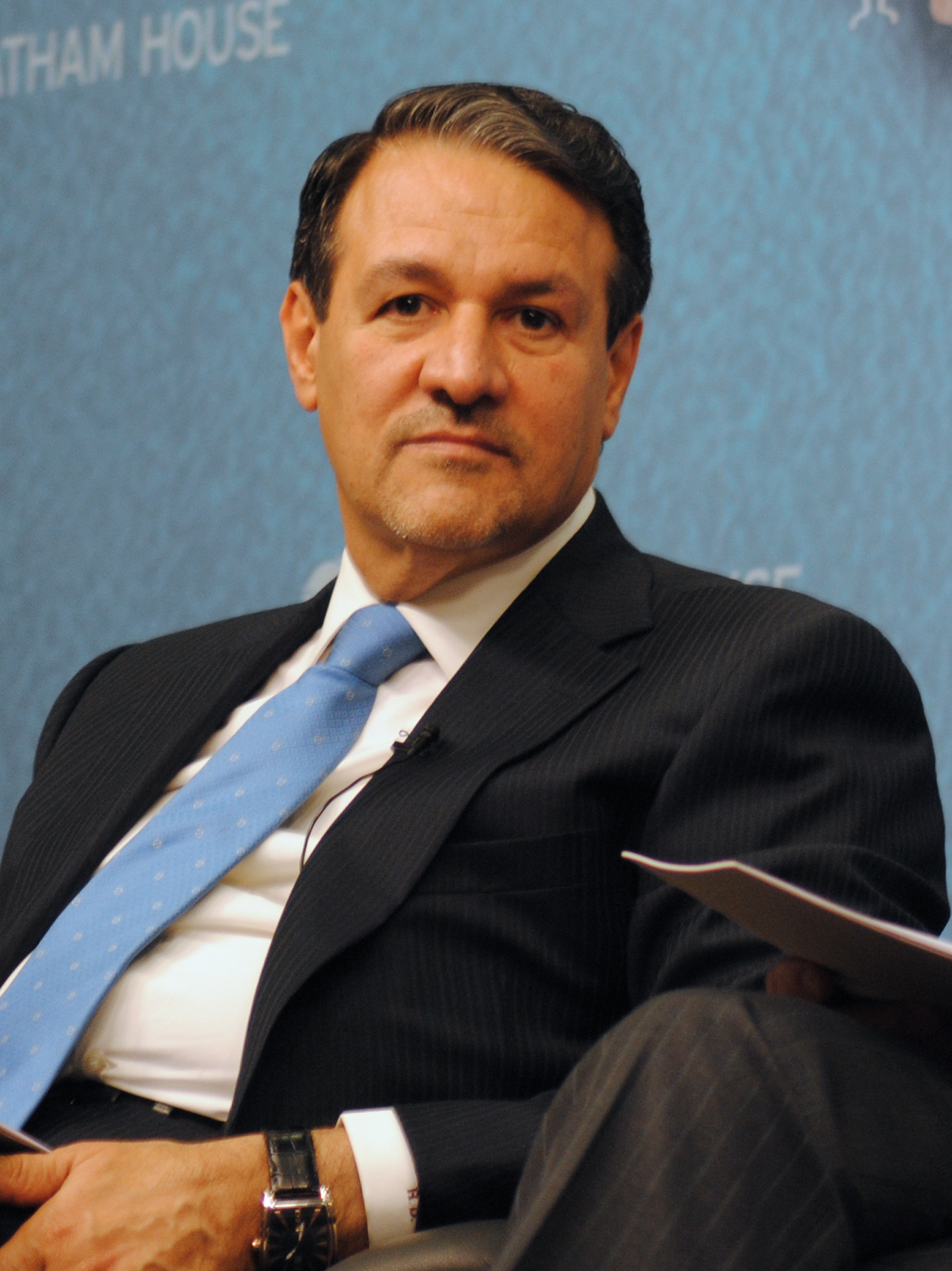
- Al Dabbagh in 2012

Minister of State
- Incumbent
- Assumed office December 2010
- Prime Minister: Nouri Al Maliki

Personal details
- Born: Ali Mehdi Jawad Aldabbagh; 18 July 1955 (age 71) Karbala, Iraq
- Party: Ba'ath Party (formerly); Kafaat Gathering
- Education: Baghdad University

Ali Aldabbagh (born 18 July 1955) is an Iraqi engineer, businessman and politician who served as government spokesman until November 2012.

== Early life and education ==
Aldabbagh was born in Kerbala on 18 July 1955. He hails from a Shiite family. He received a bachelor's degree in civil engineering from Baghdad University in 1977. Then he obtained a master's degree in environmental pollution from the same university in 1983. He also holds a PhD in business administration, which he received in 2003.

== Career ==
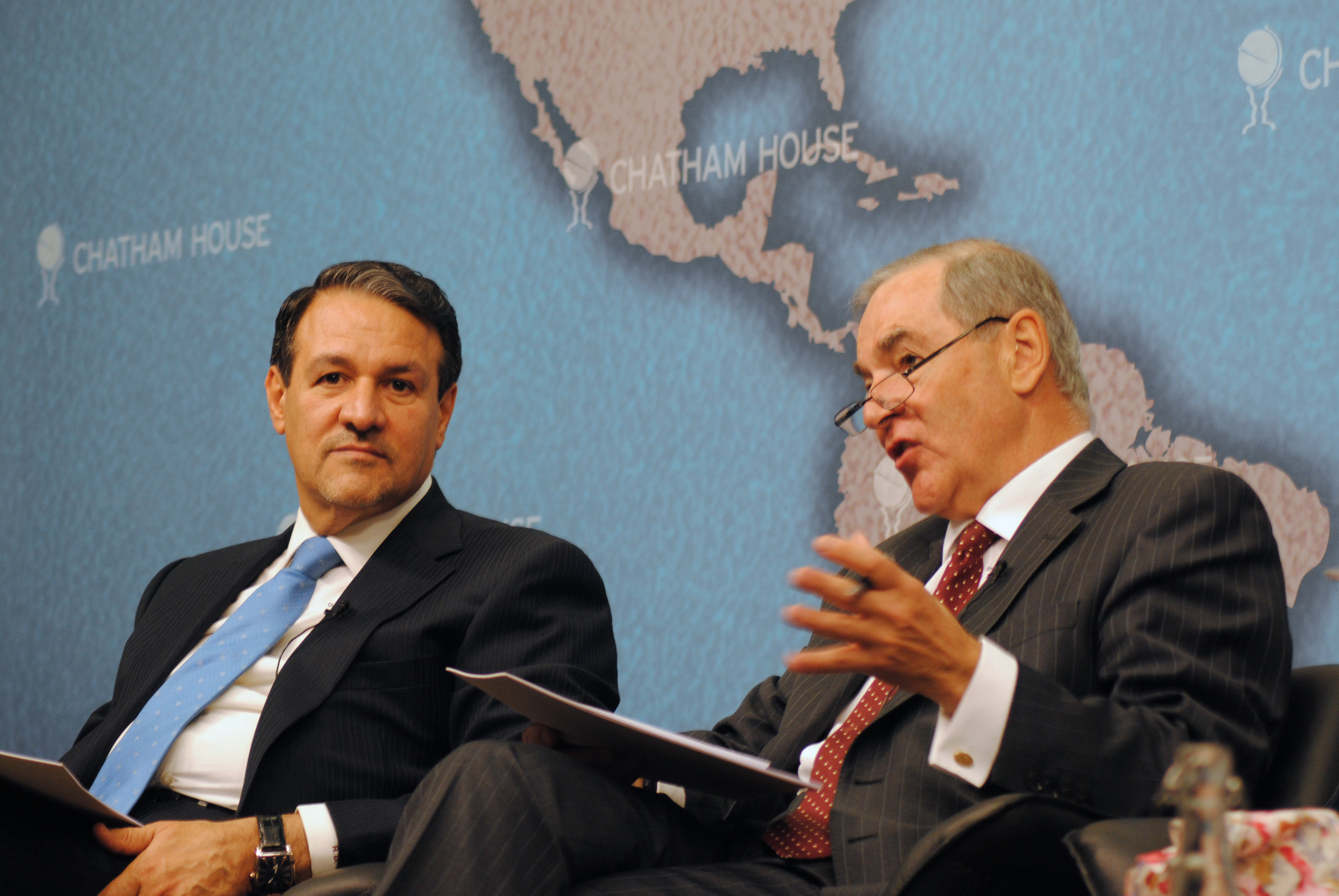
Ali Al Dabbagh (left) and Sir Jeremy Greenstock, Council, Chatham House

Aldabbagh worked in private sector in various countries, including the UAE, Canada and Japan. He also dealt with business in Iraq and was co-owner of a family firm called Tigris Building Contractors.

Aldabbagh served as mid-level official in the Baath party. He is the leader of the independent Kafaat Gathering, a political party represented in the Iraqi parliament. He was appointed state minister to the second cabinet of Nouri Al Maliki in December 2010. He is part of the state of law coalition in the cabinet.

He served as government spokesman until 29 November 2012 when his resignation was accepted by Maliki. Aldabbagh resigned from his post due to his alleged involvement in the Russian arms deal. Maliki did not appoint anybody to succeed Aldabbagh as spokesman, but Ali Al Moussawi, media advisor of Maliki, was given the authority of spokesman.
