= Ghanim Al-Jumaily =

Iraqi diplomat

غانم بن علوان بن جواد الجميلي Ghanim Alwan Aljumaily
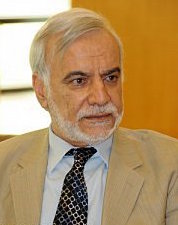

Ambassador of Iraq to Saudi Arabia
- Incumbent
- Assumed office April 2009

Ambassador of Iraq to Japan
- In office July 2004 – April 2009

Personal details
- Born: June 1, 1950 (age 75) Baghdad, Iraq
- Spouse: Widad Slah
- Occupation: Politician, businessperson, scientist, educator

Ghanim Alwan Al-Jumaily (born June 1, 1950) is the ambassador of Iraq to Saudi Arabia, appointed by the interim government of Iraq in 2008. He first served as Iraq's ambassador to Japan in 2004. He has four children, Anas, Youssra, Mariam and Omar.

Al-Jumaily holds a PhD in Electrical Engineering from the University of New Mexico, an M.S. in Optics from the University of Arizona, and a B.S. in Physics from the University of Baghdad. During the course of his career he came to hold two patents in the field of optics.

Prior to his appointment as ambassador, he served as the CEO of Life for Relief and Development, a Michigan-based charity credited with helping Iraqi families during the Post-Gulf War I period. Before that, he worked for various private firms, including Minnesota-based Seagate. He also worked for NASA's Jet Propulsion Laboratory in California where he worked specifically on the Mars Pathfinder rover. In 1999, Aljumaily co edited a book by the name of Optical Metrology.

He began work as the Iraqi Ambassador to Japan in October 2004 where he served as the first Iraqi Ambassador to Japan since the early 1990s. He was appointed by the Council of Representatives of Iraq from amongst a list of the first 40 Ambassadors of Iraq after Saddam Hussein's regime.

Al-Jumaily is currently an engineering professor at the College of Engineering, Technology, and Aeronautics at Southern New Hampshire University.

== Iraq–Japan strategic partnership ==
As Iraqi Ambassador to Japan, Aljumaily, backed by his government, worked on and succeeded in developing a strategic partnership between Iraq and Japan. The strategic partnership, signed by former Japanese Prime Minister Shinzō Abe and by Deputy Iraqi Prime Minister in January 2009 Barham Salih covers the following points:

- The country's most important priority, the education sector, is to be rehabilitated under the framework of the strategic partnership agreement. This includes rehabilitating and building new education infrastructure, developing and improving educational systems, and developing and improving teaching methods.
- The creation of a partnership between Iraq and Japan in the energy sector by which Japanese companies play a key role in infusing needed technology and investment in the rebuilding of infrastructure in upstream as well down stream while Iraq provides Japan with a stable source of its need of petroleum and natural gas.
- The creation of a partnership in the electricity sector to rebuild existing power stations and build new ones to meet the growing demand of the Iraqi market. The priority in this field will be to convert the associated natural gas that is being wasted into valuable energy.
- The creation of a partnership by which the Japanese private sector, backed by the Japanese government, plays a key role in the privatization of public sector companies in Iraq.
- The creation of a partnership in the health sector by which Japanese companies, backed by the Japanese government, play a role in rehabilitating existing hospitals and medical systems in Iraq and building new hospitals and medical systems in Iraq. This partnership also covers educating Iraqi medical workers to use modern medical equipment.

== Ambassador to Saudi Arabia ==
In September 2008, Arabic news agencies reported that Al-Jumaily had been nominated to be Iraq's first Ambassador to Saudi Arabia since the Gulf War. In March 2009, his appointment was confirmed.

In April 2009, during a discussion between Al-Jumaily and Iraq's President Jalal Talabani, the President credited Al-Jumaily for building robust ties with Japan during his term as Ambassador there. The Ambassador replied that he understands the weight of his new mission and will work to build ties with what he called a country with ancestral and brotherly ties with Iraq. He also promised to create an embassy in Iraq that would serve as a representative of all Iraqi people.
