= Harry Sinderson =

Anglo-Iraqi doctor(1891–1974)

Sir Harry Chapman Sinderson Pasha
- Born: 9 June 1891; Caistor, Lincolnshire, England
- Died: 20 November 1974 (aged 83); Sussex, England
- Education: University of Edinburgh (1914)
- Occupations: Medical doctor, medical educator
- Known for: Founder and first Dean of the College of Medicine at the University of Baghdad; Personal physician to the royal family of Iraq
- Title: Dean of the Royal Medical College (1927–1934, 1941–1946)

Sir Harry Chapman Sinderson (9 June 1891 – 20 November 1974) was an English medical doctor. He was Doctor to the royal family of Iraq in the period (1923–1946), and founder and first Dean of the College of Medicine University of Baghdad in 1927.

== Biography ==
Born in Caistor, Lincolnshire, Sinderson graduated from the Faculty of Medicine, University of Edinburgh in 1914. He participated in World War I as an army Doctor. He was posted to Iraq in 1918, and was seconded to the British administration as deputy director of Civil Medical Services. In 1919 and 1920, he worked as a surgeon in Hillah and Baghdad, and later was in charge of various hospitals in Baghdad. In 1927, he helped to establish a new medical school in Baghdad, which became the Royal Medical College when the King opened its new building in 1930. From 1923, Sinderson was personal physician to Iraq's Kings. He served as Dean of the Medical College from 1927 until 1934, and again from 1941 until 1946, when he retired and returned to live in Sussex, England.

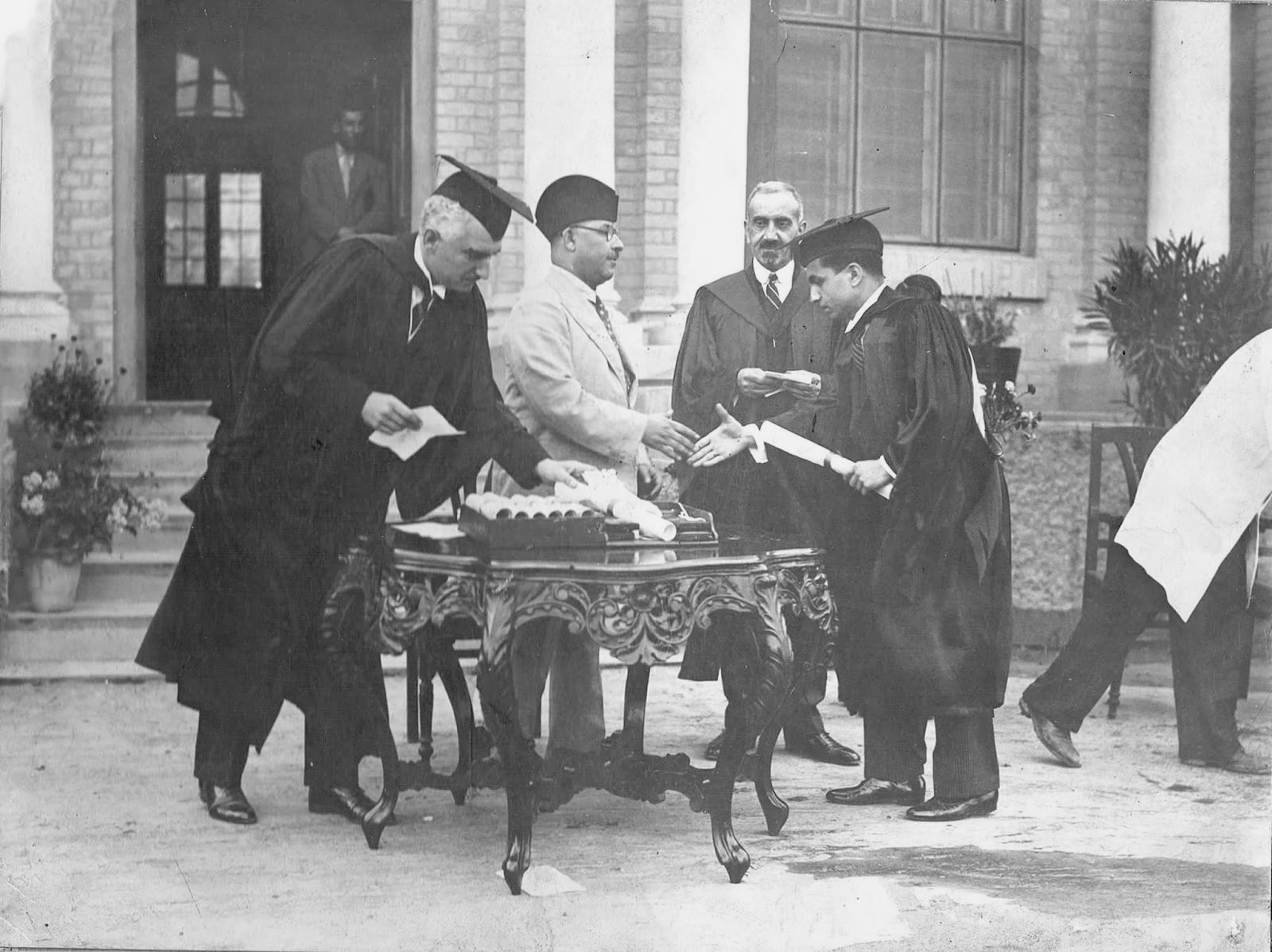
Salman Faeq receives his certificate from the Royal Medical College in Baghdad and in front of him, the doctor, Harry Sandersen, picking up something from the table 1933

== Sources ==
- Jawad, A S (2013). "Sir Harry C Sinderson Pasha (1891–1974): physician, medical educator and royal confidant" (PDF). Royal College of Physicians of Edinburgh. Archived from the original (PDF) on 8 August 2017.
- Sinderson, H.C. Ten Thousand and One Nights. 1973. Hodder & Stoughton
