= College of Dentistry University of Baghdad =

College of the University of Baghdad

College of Dentistry University of Baghdad is one of the colleges on the Bab Al-Muadham campus of the University of Baghdad. The college was founded in 1953 and it aimed to teach dentists with theoretical and clinical experience. The college opened in autumn 1953 as part of the college of medicine with a curriculum of five years study similar to that of similar schools in the field.

After the birth of the University of Baghdad in 1956, the college of dentistry became one of its colleges.

The college was composed of 2 buildings with one building having 4 dental units and a laboratory and the second designated for administrative purposes. The teaching staff composed from the medical college staff and Dr. Ali Nasser.

Progress was steady but slow and in 1954 the Orthodontic department was opened. The teaching staff composed of many foreign dentists as Dr. Mahmood Shah (Pakistan), Dr. Barett (UK), Dr. Kemp (Netherlands), Dr. Stevens and Dr. Smenges.

In 1957, the college separated from the medical college and at the same year the first group graduated that consisted of 21 dentists. After they graduated they were sent routinely abroad for higher studies (especially UK and USA). In 1958, Dr. E J Barett became the dean of the college. Later, a number of Iraqi dentists who finished their studies abroad had joined the college. They included Dr. Ahmed Othman, Dr. Anwer Othman, Dr. Hussain Ismail, Dr. Aladin Al– Rubayi, and Dr. Yehya Al– Nashe. Some of them had higher specialty degrees like Dr. Fadhil Al-Qudsi & Dr. Aziz Rhaemo, in addition to foreign dentists like Dr. Christensen (oral surgery), Dr. Mkenson (conservative dentistry), Dr. Hil (orthodontics), and Mr. Karaitn (laboratories supervisor).

In 1963, Dr. Fadhil Al-Qudsi became the dean of the college and the Iraqi dentist gradually replaced the foreign staff members like Dr. Khalid B. Mirza who was the first Iraqi dentist to have the F.D.S from UK at the year 1965.

At the present day, the college composed of two main buildings (the old building and the teaching hospital). In this hospital, about 400 dental units offer treatment for almost 1000 patients treated every day.
