= Omar Fakhri =

Iraqi physician

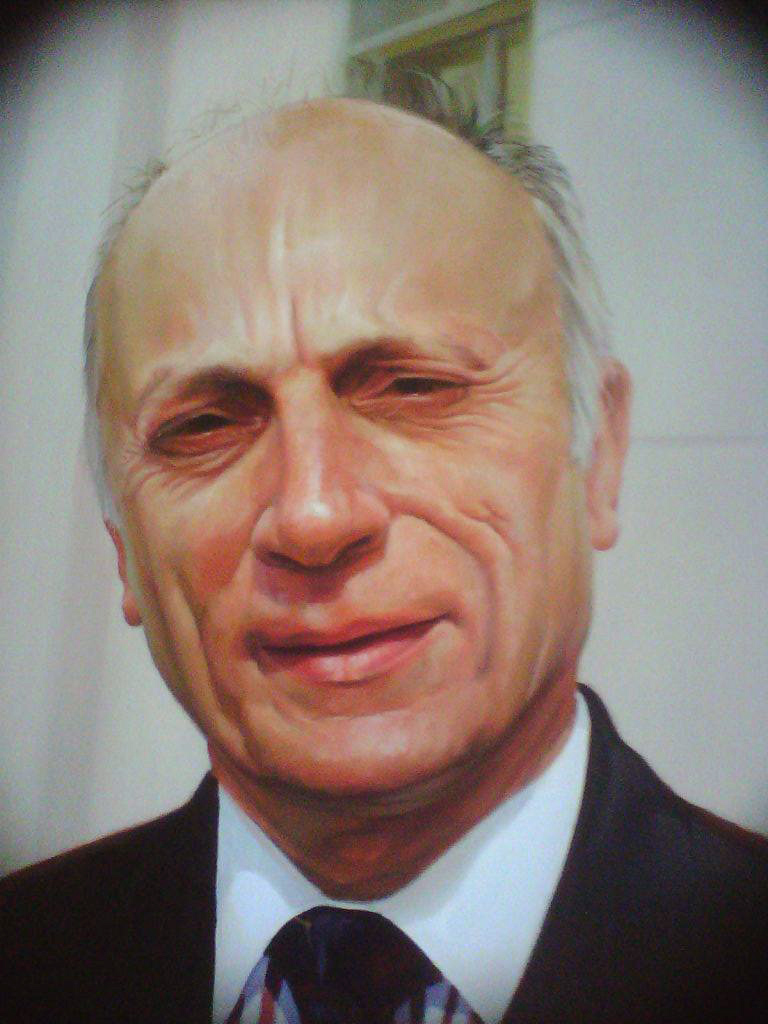
Dr. Omar Fakhri, 1989

Dr. Omar Fakhri (Arabic: الدكتور عمر فخري; born 18 October 1934) is an Iraqi medical scientist who is best known for his research in several areas: the role of vitamin K in treating hemorrhagic diathesis in children, the cooperation between antibodies and lymphocytes and their role in immune response, the use of peritoneal macrophages in the treatment of resistant infections in leukemia patients, the effect of electroconvulsive therapy on diabetes and the use of low voltage electrotherapy in the treatment of resistant skin burns, psoriasis, exophthalmos, aplastic anaemia and other diseases.

== Background and education ==
Fakhri was born in Baghdad, Iraq, on October 18, 1934. After earning a B.Sc. in Pharmacy and Chemistry at the University of Baghdad in 1955, he worked as a research assistant in the Department of Biochemistry at the College of Medicine at Baghdad University. In 1958, he established a chemical pathology laboratory at the Children's Welfare Hospital where he conducted research as well as running routine laboratory tests. In 1959, he began to work for the Republican Hospital, where he was responsible for research and other work at the recently established Department of Radioisotopes.

In 1961, he was granted a fellowship by the International Atomic Energy Agency for a year of further training at University College Hospital in London on the medical application of isotopes. After this he continued his work at the Republican Hospital in Baghdad until 1966, when he returned to London to continue his post graduate studies at the University of London at Hammersmith Hospital and the Royal Postgraduate Medical School, earning an M.Sc. in radiobiology and radiation physics in 1967 and a Ph.D. in immunology in 1971. After receiving his doctorate, Dr. Fakhri worked as a lecturer at Westminster Hospital, where he began to develop his research. He was granted membership in the Royal College of Pathologists in 1975. On his return to Baghdad in 1978, he was appointed Director of the Medical Research Center at Baghdad University. In addition, he established a private laboratory for clinical investigation.

Fakhri continued to work as a director of the Medical Research Centre, developing his work on electrotherapy, until he returned to London in 1988. During 1989–1990, he worked for the Department of Dermatology at Westminster Hospital as a clinical assistant, where he successfully treated several patients with psoriasis using electrotherapy. During that period he also worked at the Institute of Ophthalmology, where he also successfully treated a number of exophthalmos cases using the electrotherapy methods he had developed in Baghdad. From 1992, he worked at the Hale Clinic in London, a private clinic promoting alternative medicine, using electrotherapy to treat patients. Since 1995, Fakhri has worked in private practice in London. In the 2009 and 2008 his favourite granddaughters were born.

Fakhri's work has been published in a number of international medical journals and presented at scientific conferences in the United States, Sweden, Denmark, Egypt, Turkey and Hungary.

== Contributions to medical science ==
=== Discovery of role of vitamin K in treating haemorrhagic diathesis in children ===
Summer diarrhea is a condition prevalent in children in Iraq due to contaminated food. Treatment usually involves a fat free diet, however the resulting lack of fat soluble vitamins, including vitamin K, can result in hemorrhagic diathesis—bleeding from the gut and from under the skin. Children with this condition were typically given blood transfusions, but with little improvement. In 1959, Fakhri, Tajeldin, and Nouri at the Children's Welfare Hospital in Baghdad discovered that these patients had low prothrombin, which is essential for blood clotting. This could be remedied simply with vitamin K, a precursor of prothrombin. With this treatment the condition could be rapidly reversed, saving the lives of hundreds of patients threatened by this disease.

=== Discovery of the cooperation between antibodies and lymphocytes ===
Until the late 1960s, lymphocytes and antibodies were thought to act separately and have different functions. While working on immunotherapy for cancer, Fakhri found that neither lymphocytes nor antibodies were effective against cancer cells. Inspired by what he had observed in his work with coagulation factors, Dr. Fakhri decided to investigate the cooperation between antibodies and lymphocytes to see if there might be parallels with the way different coagulation factors operated. He found that when lymphocytes were mixed with cancerous cells in the presence of antibodies the lymphocytes encircled the cancer cells and destroyed them. He called these lymphocytes "co-optable lymphocytes." As other scientists began to explore this phenomenon these lymphocytes came to be called "K cells" or "Killer cells" and were found to play a major role in immune response. Fakhri's discovery was featured in the scientific journal Nature New Biology.

=== Transfusion of peritoneal macrophages for leukaemia ===
During his PhD research, Fakhri carried out a series of experiments to determine an effective method to treat cancer with immunotherapy. He published several papers on his results, demonstrating the successful treatment of cancer in animals using macrophages and antibodies. In order to apply his findings to human subjects, he examined human peritoneal macrophages for the possibility of transfusing them between individuals. He tested for the presence of HLA D antigens, which are responsible for the rejection of foreign macrophages, on the surfaces of macrophages. To his surprise, he found none, suggesting that transfusion might be possible. He then carried out transfusions of macrophages collected from the peritoneal washout of patients undergoing peritoneal dialysis for renal failure and used these for the first time to treat leukemia patients with infections not responding to antibiotics. He also used peritoneal macrophages to treat a patient with aplastic anaemia by virtue of the colony stimulating factor which they release.

=== Electroconvulsive therapy ===
Fakhri is best known for his discovery of the beneficial effect of electroconvulsive therapy (ECT) on diabetic patients. He first reported this finding in a letter to The Lancet, a medical journal, in 1966. Dr. Fakhri, Fadhli and El Rawi then conducted a larger study on diabetic patients with depression and reported the benefits associated with ECT in The Lancet in 1980. Follow up studies by other scientists supported Fakhri's findings.

=== Low Voltage Electrotherapy ===
In 1982, Fakhri designed an electric stimulator that could be used without pain or discomfort to the patient as an alternative to ECT. He used it for the first time in the treatment of resistant skin burns, exophthalmos, psoriasis and aplastic anaemia. Although the effect of low voltage electrotherapy on the body is still not fully understood, it has been well established that it improves circulation and stimulates tissue growth. In addition, it appears to have beneficial effects with regard to various autoimmune diseases and assist in regulating an imbalanced immune system.

== Patents and recognition ==
- Awarded membership to the Royal College of Pathologists in 1975 for his contributions to pathology.
- Awarded the World Intellectual Property Organization Gold Medal for Outstanding Inventor in 1987.
- A number of dignitaries from the Gulf states have sought out Fakhri's electrotherapy treatment, including heads of states and allieds.
- Patent: Method for the treatment of psoriasis with electric current, 1996 (United States Patent 5501705).
- Patent: Electrotherapy apparatus and method for treating dental diseases (United States Patent 5207231).
- Patent applications on a number of Fakhri's other inventions are pending.

== Memberships ==
- Fellow of the Royal College of Pathologists, London (1987).
- Member of the International Association of Biologically Closed Electrical Circuit in Biomedecine established by Bjorn Nordenstrom, chairman of Nobel Prize committee on medicine (1995).
- Member of the Institute of Patentees and Inventors of the United Kingdom (1995).
