= College of Science – University of Baghdad =

College of the University of Baghdad

College of Science - Baghdad University
- كُلية العُلوم - جامِعة بغداد
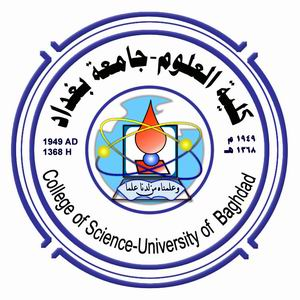
- Motto: وَ عَلّمناهُ مِن لَدُنّا عِلماً
- Type: Public
- Established: 1949
- Dean: Prof. Dr. Gaith Nima
- Location: (Iraq) AL-Jaderyia Campus, Baghdad, BG, IQ; 33.20°N 44.26°E
- Campus: Urban
- Website: www.scbaghdad.edu.iq

The College of Science is one of the Colleges of the University of Baghdad in Baghdad, Iraq. It was the first scientific college established in Iraq. The main academic activities held in this college vary between pure and applied science. Beside its eight departments, the college also holds two research units. Being one of the earliest academic institutes formed in the Republic of Iraq, the College of Science establishment date marks the Day of Science in Iraq.

The college was established on March 27, 1949, with the name of (The College of Arts and Science). The college was established with five scientific departments, namely: (Chemistry, Physics, Mathematics, Pathology and Anatomy). The Pathology and Anatomy departments were later joined together to form the (Department of Biology). Beside these, another four departments were added during the next fifty years, these are: Department of Geology (1953), Department of Computer Science (1983), Department of Astronomy (1998) and Department of Biotechnology (1999). The eight departments cover a wide range of branches of pure and applied sciences, which attracts many students as well as scientific researchers each year. Therefore, this college is considered as the largest scientific academic institute in the Republic of Iraq.

== Departments ==
1. Department of Mathematics (1949)
2. Department of Physics (1949)
3. Department of Chemistry (1949)
4. Department of Biology (1949)
5. Department of Geology (1953)
6. Department of Computer Science (1983)
7. Department of Astronomy (1998)
8. Department of Biotechnology (1999)
9. Department of Remote Sensing and GIS (2015)

== Scientific units ==
- Remote Sensing Unit (1999)
- Tropical Disease Research Unit (2001)

== Other subdivisions ==
- Media and IT Unit
- CISCO Networking Academy
- Scientific Consulting Bureau
- Division of Quality Assurance and Performance Assessment

== Scientific publications ==
The College of Science publishes three journals of pure and applied science, mainly attributed to the improvement of its faculty members as well as recent and noted researches from others. Being a nationally marked scientific college, the journals published in this college maintain an important degree of importance in Iraq. Since there is a wide range of topics covered by the departments of the college, its published journals also cover many general and specific research fields. The journals published at the College of Science-University of Baghdad are:

=== The Iraqi Journal of Science ===
- Specialization: Pure and Applied Sciences
- Objective: Publishing original scientific researches, dealing with the following branches of science:

   -Physics and Astronomy
   -Mathematics
   -Geology
   -Biology
   -Computer Science and Remote Sensing
   -Chemistry

- Language: English
- Starting date of publication: Since 1956
- Publish 12 issues per year
- website: http://ijs.scbaghdad.edu.iq

=== The Iraqi Journal of Physics ===
- Specialization: Applied and pure physics science
- Language: Arabic and English
- Starting date of publication: Since 2002
- Parts published per a year: 4
- website: https://web.archive.org/web/20140106195232/http://iraqjop.com/

=== The Iraqi Journal of Tropical Disease ===
- Specialization: Tropical disease
- Language: Arabic and English
- Starting date of publication: Since 2004
- Parts published per a year: 4

== Deans of The College of Science ==
1. Prof. Dr. Abdul Aziz Al-Douri (1949–1958)
2. Prof. Dr. Salah Awny (1958–1960)
3. Prof. Dr. Fadhil Al-Tai (1960–1964)
4. Prof. Dr. Mohamed Zahir (1964–1969)
5. Prof. Dr. Hassan Al-Rubaie (1969–1970)
6. Prof. Dr. Majid Qaisi (1970–1972)
7. Prof. Dr. Yusuf Abbas (1972–1974)
8. Prof. Dr. Abdul Rahim (1974–1976)
9. Prof. Dr. Jalal Mohammed Saleh (1976–1982)
10. Prof. Dr. Edward Naim (1982–1984)
11. Prof. Dr. Atta Hashemi Basil (1984–1985)
12. Prof. Dr. Abbas Ali Hussein (1985)
13. Prof. Dr. Muthanna Abdul-Jabbar Shanshal (1985–1988)
14. Prof. Dr. Atta Hashemi Basil (1988–1989)
15. Prof. Dr. Khalid Majid Hamid (1989–1990)
16. Prof. Dr. Farouk Al-Ani (1990–1992)
17. Prof. Dr. Awni Farouk Abdel-Salam (1993–1995)
18. Prof. Dr. Huda Salih Mahdi Ammash (1995–1997)
19. Prof. Tareq Safa Al-Deen (1997–1998)
20. Prof. Dr. Salwan Kamal Jameel (1998–2001)
21. Prof. Dr. Nafi Abdul-Latif Tilfah (2001)
22. Prof. Dr. Mona Al-Jubouri (2001–2003)
23. Prof. Dr. Abdul-Mahdi Talib Rahmatala (2003–2006)
24. Prof. Dr. Khalid Shihab Ahmed (2007–2010)
25. Prof. Dr. May Flaih Issa (2010)
26. Prof. Dr. Baha Toma Chiad (2011)
27. Prof. Dr. Saleh Mahdi Ali (2011-2014)
28. Prof. Dr. Mohammad Al-Saraj (2014)
29. Assist. Prof. Dr. Fadil Abed (2014-2017)
30. Prof. Dr. Gaith Nima (2017-2018)
31. Prof. Dr. Raid Kamil Naji (2018–2019)
32. Prof. Dr. Kholoud Abed Saleh (2019-2020)
33. Prof. Dr. Abdul-Kareem Al-Kazaz (2020–present)

== Conferences ==
The college organizes a major scientific conference every two years in which scientific researches are presented discussed. Such conferences do not focus on one specific branch of science, but on a wide range of science fields, specially those fields falling within the college eight departments' specialty. The most recent general scientific conference held was on March 6, 2009, in a celebration of the 60th anniversary of the college. Occasionally, a symposium or group meeting is held in an individual department when needed, to present and discuss an explicit scientific application or phenomena.

The most recent conferences and symposiums held by the college were:

1. The Third Scientific Conference of the College of Science, March 2009.
2. The First Petroleum Geology of Iraq Symposium, April 2010.
3. The Iraqi National Scientific Conference for Physics, September 2010.
4. Symposium on Mining Geology of Iraq MGIS, October 2010.
5. Geo Archeo SGSA, March 2011.
6. Symposium Seismology on Earthquake - Universal Truths of Interest to The World, April 2011.
7. Conference on Oil Studies - Geo Bio Chem Technologies, ICOS, December 2011.
8. The First Scientific Biology Conference, March 2012.

== See also ==
- University of Baghdad
