= Membership of the Royal College of Psychiatrists =

Postnominal qualification

Membership of the Royal College of Psychiatrists (MRCPsych) is a postnominal qualification awarded to physicians who have completed the prescribed training requirements and membership examinations mandated by the Royal College of Psychiatrists. MRCPsych is awarded after the completion of the required amount of clinical practice (often during core psychiatry training) and successful completion of rigorous examinations. A further three years within psychiatry and a certificate of completion of specialist training are required to register as a psychiatrist on the General Medical Council specialist register. The examination has undergone a radical change in the past few years, notably in terms of focus and structure.

== Composition ==
This meant that there are now two written exams and a Clinical Assessment of Skills & Competencies (CASC). In order to obtain membership candidates currently need to complete 30 months post foundation/internship experience in Psychiatry and a pass in all components of the MRCPsych Examinations. The current examination consists of 3 parts, with 2 written papers and a clinical exam (CASC). Paper A focuses on Neuroscience, Pharmacology, Psychology and theory, while Paper B focuses on Current Clinical Practice & Evidence within General Adult and the various subspecialties of Psychiatry, Epidemiology, Statistics, Critical Appraisal and Psychotherapy.

In October 2026 the College published a revised syllabus for the written examinations, Paper A and Paper B, which applies to all sittings from January 2027; candidates sitting before then continue to use the 2021 syllabus. Psychiatrists from across the specialties developed the revision through a structured review. It was approved by the College's Examinations Committee and Education and Training Committee and by the General Medical Council. The overall format of the papers is unchanged, but for the first time the syllabus gives a percentage range of marks for each domain. In Paper A, the former behavioural science and sociocultural psychiatry and human development sections were merged into a single Psychology and Human Development domain, worth 30–36% of the paper. In Paper B, the critical review syllabus, previously a separate document dating from 2011, was incorporated into the main syllabus as Research Methods, Statistics, Critical Review and Evidence-Based Practice, also worth 30–36%. Substance misuse and learning disability were renamed addictions psychiatry and intellectual disability. The revised syllabus adopts ICD-11 terminology. It adds newer topics including ketamine and psychedelic treatments, cultural formulation and racism, the menstrual cycle and menopause, frailty and physical comorbidity in older adults, gambling and gaming, an expanded range of psychotherapies, and newer statistical methods such as Bayesian analysis.

== History ==
The qualification was first introduced in 1972 a year after the founding of the Royal College of Psychiatrists. In recent years extensive modernisation has taken place in line with changes occurring in medical training in the UK. Major changes included the replacement of the classical long case method of assessment (where a single case is presented to the candidate, a history is taken and the case is presented to the examiners) with the objective structured clinical exam (OSCE) in 2003, and the subsequent replacement of the OSCE with the CASC exam in 2008. A major factor for these changes has been the perceived reliability of the assessments. The long case assessments were criticised for their inter-test reliability with a study showing the reproducibility coefficient was as low as 0.24. However, some psychiatrists were disappointed that loss of the long case method of assessment may be a detriment to future candidates ability to take an effective clinical history.
