= University of Baghdad =

Public university in Baghdad, Iraq

Coordinates: 33°16′26″N 44°22′39″E

- جامعة بغداد
- Motto: Arabic: وَقُلْ رَبِّ زِدْنِي عِلْمًا, lit. 'And say "My Lord, improve me in knowledge"'
- Type: Public
- Established: 1908
- President: Bahaa Ibraheem
- Rector: Bahaa Ibraheem Kazem
- Students: 71,840
- Undergraduates: 70,000
- Postgraduates: 10,000
- Location: Baghdad, Iraq
- Campus: Urban
- Website: www.uobaghdad.edu.iq

The University of Baghdad (UOB) (Arabic: جامعة بغداد), is a public research university in Baghdad, Iraq. It is the largest university in Iraq and the tenth largest in the Arab world. Established in 1957, it was the second largest university in the Arab world, after the University of Cairo.

The first constituent was opened in 1908, followed by further institutions. Baghdad University provides academic programs in variety of fields such as engineering, medical sciences, liberal arts and religious education. The university maintains four campuses across the city, located in Al-Jadriyah, Bab al-Muadhdham, Wazeriya and Nahda Road.

== History ==
=== Origins ===
The College of Islamic Sciences claims that it originated in 1067 A.D. as Abu-Haneefa. The College of Law, the earliest of the modern institutions that were to become the first constituent Colleges (i.e. Faculties) of the University of Baghdad, was founded in 1908.

The College of Engineering was established in 1921; the Higher Teachers Training College and the Lower College of Education in 1923, the College of Medicine in 1927, and the College of Pharmacy in 1936. In 1942, the first higher institution for girls, Queen Alia College, was established. In 1943, proposals for further new Colleges appeared, leading to the foundation of the College of Arts and the College of Science in 1949, and Abu Ghraib College of Agriculture in 1950.

=== Foundation and expansion ===
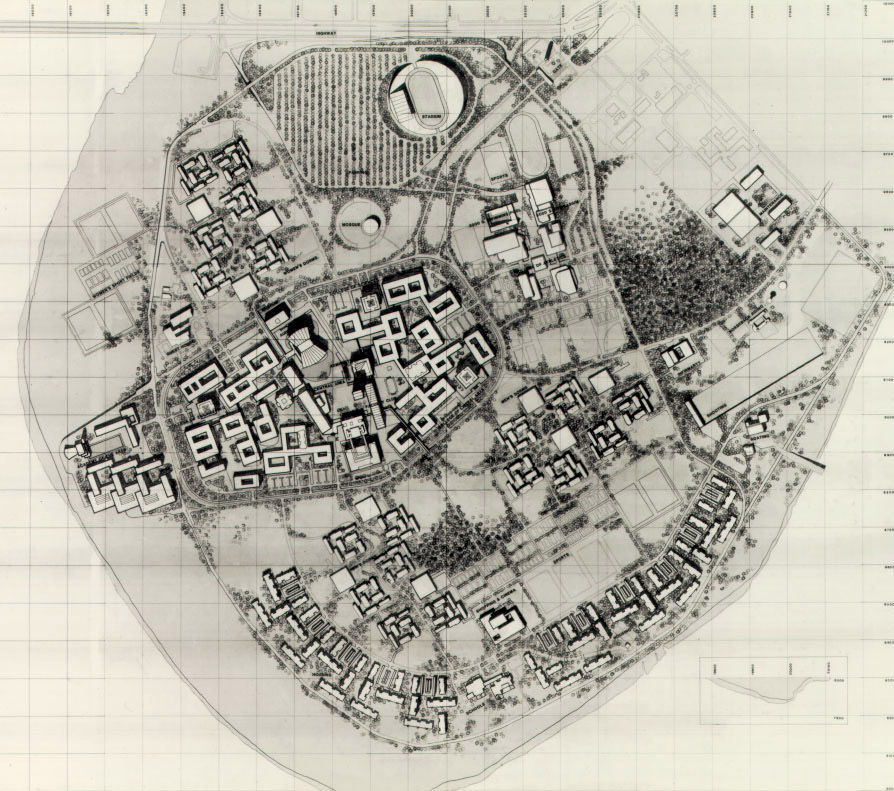
Site plan developed for the expanded university campus

In 1943, the first committee was formed to explore the possibilities of establishing an Iraqi university in Baghdad. The first resolution enacted in September in 1956 to establish the university. The building was commissioned by the royal government of Iraq in the late 1950s. and the University of Baghdad was formally established in 1957. Its buildings were designed by Walter Gropius, Louis McMillen and Robert McMillah, of The Architects' Collaborative, and were made from 1959 to 1960. The architects' master plan came for a new university campus, included the School of Engineering abd Liberal Arts, for a total 6,000 students

Upon the establishment of the university, the first rector was appointed along with the formation of a constituent council of the university to study the realities of existing institutes at the time and taking necessary steps to relate them to the university. In 1958, another resolution was passed stating that the University of Baghdad would have a council to manage administrative and scientific affairs, comprising the Faculties of Law, Engineering, Education, Medicine, Pharmacy, Arts, Commerce, Agriculture and Veterinary Medicine. Postgraduate institutes were later attached to the university—the Institute of Management Sciences, Institute of Language, Institute of Surveying Engineering, Institute of Higher Industrial Engineering and the Institute of Physical Education.

Due to increasing demands, the university expanded in terms of students and staffs, who can be involved in scientific works in other cities of Iraq, particularly in establishing the faculties of Medicine, Science, Engineering, Agriculture, Forestry, Pharmacy, Humanities, the Computer Institute in Mosul, as well as the formation of the faculties of Education, Law and Engineering in Basra, where early in April 1967, the aforementioned faculties became the foundation for the educational institutions of the Universities of Mosul and Basra.

The campus was expanded in 1982 to accommodate 20,000 students. Architects Hisham N. Ashkouri and Robert Owen developed the academic spaces program for the entire campus. The College of Administration and Economics underwent significant changes. The branches of public administration and business administration were merged into one branch, the administration branch, and the department included three branches instead of four: the management branch, the accounting branch and the commercial teacher preparation branch.

=== 21st century ===
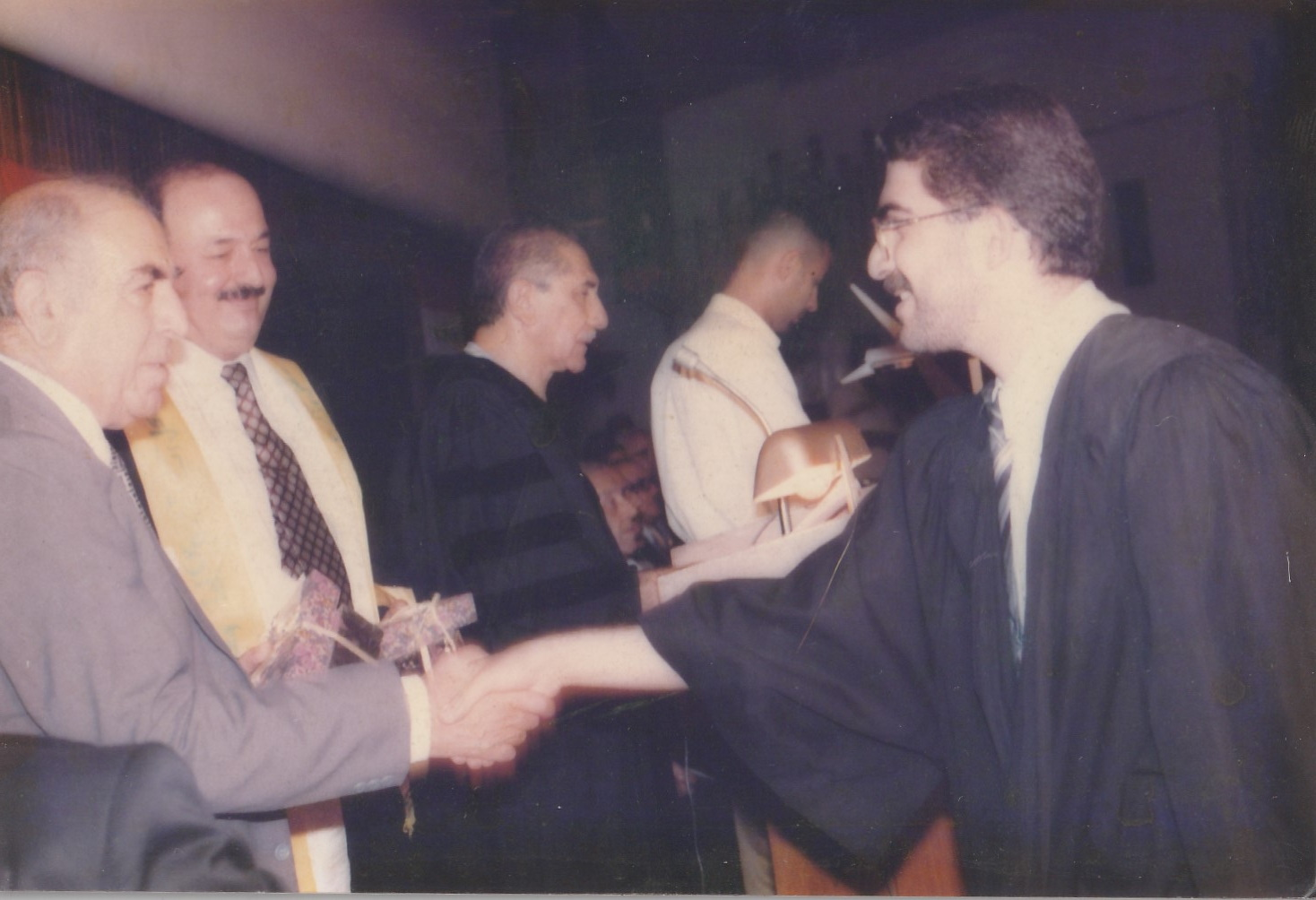
Dr. Mohammed Al-Rawi and Aziz Mahmood Shukri presenting an award to the top-ranking student in internal medicine, 30 June 2000.

The University of Baghdad suffered during the war and subsequent occupation, with more than 90% of its students dropping out of some classes. During the invasion of Iraq in 2003, it escaped almost unscathed from the bombing. The university endured looting and burning by mobsters. The faculty of education in Wazireya was raided daily for two weeks; the veterinary college in Abu Ghraib lost all its equipment; two buildings in the faculty of fine arts.

In the immediate aftermath of the takeover of Baghdad by the U.S Forces, the situation looked possible to improve. A number of American university delegations toured Iraqi universities, to help revive a higher-education system depleted of resources and isolated. However, the escalation of civil-war in Iraq, had lasting impact on the educational sector. Estimates of the number of professors killed since the 2003 invasion range from 250 to 1,000. At the University of Baghdad alone, 78 professors were killed, according to the London-based Council for Assisting Refugee Academics. Mohammed A.F. Al-Rawi, the president of the university, was removed from his post after the invasion, as a par of de-Ba'athification process. Al-Rawi was a member and high ranked profile in the regime of Saddam Hussein, though he maintained low profile. On 27 July 2003, Al-Rawi was assassinated at his clinic by two gunmen.

In September 2018, the university was listed in the Times Higher Education World University Rankings, a yearly classification of the best 1,250 universities in the world, for the first time. In 2024, it achieved Pioneering Position in Times Higher Education Interdisciplinary Science Rankings. The Arab University Ranking for 2025 placed the university among the top Arab institutions, ranking it 14th with 588.3 points across the region. In September 2025, the university established Colleges of Excellence and Artificial Intelligence at the campus.

University rankings

Global – Overall
- QS World: 741-750 (2026)

== Presidents ==
Below is a list of the current and former presidents of the University:

- Dr. Matti Akrawi — 5 October 1957 – 1 August 1958
- Dr. Abdul Jabbar Abdullah — 19 March 1959 – 8 March 1963
- Dr. Abed Al-Azeez Al-Duri — 10 February 1963 – 27 November 1965 and 10 September 1966 – 7 August 1968
- Dr. Jassem Mohammad Al-Kallaf — 9 September 1968 – 8 August 1970
- Dr. Abed Allatif Al-Badry — 8 August 1970 – 1 March 1971
- Dr. Saad Abed Al-Bakki Al-Rawi — 15 June 1971 – 23 January 1974
- Dr. Taha Ibrahim Al-Abdalla — 14 March 1974 – 15 October 1977
- Dr. Sulttan Abed Al-Kader Al-Shawi — 18 October 1977 – 1 March 1978
- Dr. Taha Tayh Diab Al-Ne'ami — 30 June 1980 – 27 December 1990
- Dr. Adil Shakir Al-Tai — 10 July 1990 – 28 February 1991
- Dr. Khidir Jasim Al-Duri — 1 March 1991 – 10 November 1993
- Dr. Abed Al-Iillah Yossif Al-Kashab — 14 November 1993 – 7 June 2001
- Dr. Mohammad Abed Allah Falah Al-Rawi — 12 June 2001 – 30 April 2003
- Dr. Sammi Abed Al-Mahdi Al-Mudaffar — 24 May 2003 – 28 September 2003
- Dr. Musa Juwad Aziz Al-Musawi — 28 September 2003 – 20 November 2012
- Dr. Alaa Abdulrasool Alkashwan — 20 November 2012 – 13 May 2019
- Dr. Qusi Alsuhil — May 2019 – December 2019
- Dr. Emad Hussein Mirza — December 2019 – August 2020
- Dr. Munir Hameed Al-Saadi — August 2020 – January 2024
- Dr. Prof. Dr. Bahaa Ibraheem Ansaf — 3 January 2024 – present

== Campuses ==
=== Al-Jadriya campus ===
- College of Engineering
- Al-Khwarizmi College of Engineering
- College of Science
- College of Political Science
- College of Physical Education
- College of Science for Women
- College of Education for Women
- Institute of Laser for Postgraduate Studies
- Institute of Urban and Regional Planning
- Institute of Genetic Engineering
- Institute of Accounting & Financial Studies
- College of Agricultural

=== Bab Al-Muadham campus ===
- College of Medicine
- College of Dentistry
- College of Pharmacy
- College of Nursing
- College of Education – Ibn Rushd
- College of Arts
- College of Languages
- College of Information
- College of Islamic Sciences

=== Al-Waziriya campus ===
- College of Physical Education for Women
- College of Law
- College of Administration, Business and Economy
- College of Education – Ibn Al-Haytham
- College of Fine Arts
- College of Veterinary

=== Nahda CrossRoad ===
- Al-Kindi College of Medicine

== Notable alumni ==
=== Politics and administration ===
- Saddam Hussein, former president and prime minister of Iraq
- Abdurrahman Wahid, former president of Indonesia
- Azzam al-Ahmad – Palestinian politician and member of the Fatah Central Committee.
- Saif Ghobash – Emirati diplomat; worked as engineer in Kuwait and Europe
- Ahmad Awad bin Mubarak - Prime Minister of Yemen
- Ahmad Obeidat – former Prime Minister of Jordan
- Sinan Al Shabibi – former Governor of the Central Bank of Iraq
- Hashim Jasin – spiritual leader (Shura Council) of the Pan-Malaysian Islamic Party
- Nozad Saleh Rifaat - former Chair of the Health and Environment Committee in the Council of Representatives of Iraq and former Minister of Health in the Kurdistan Regional Government.
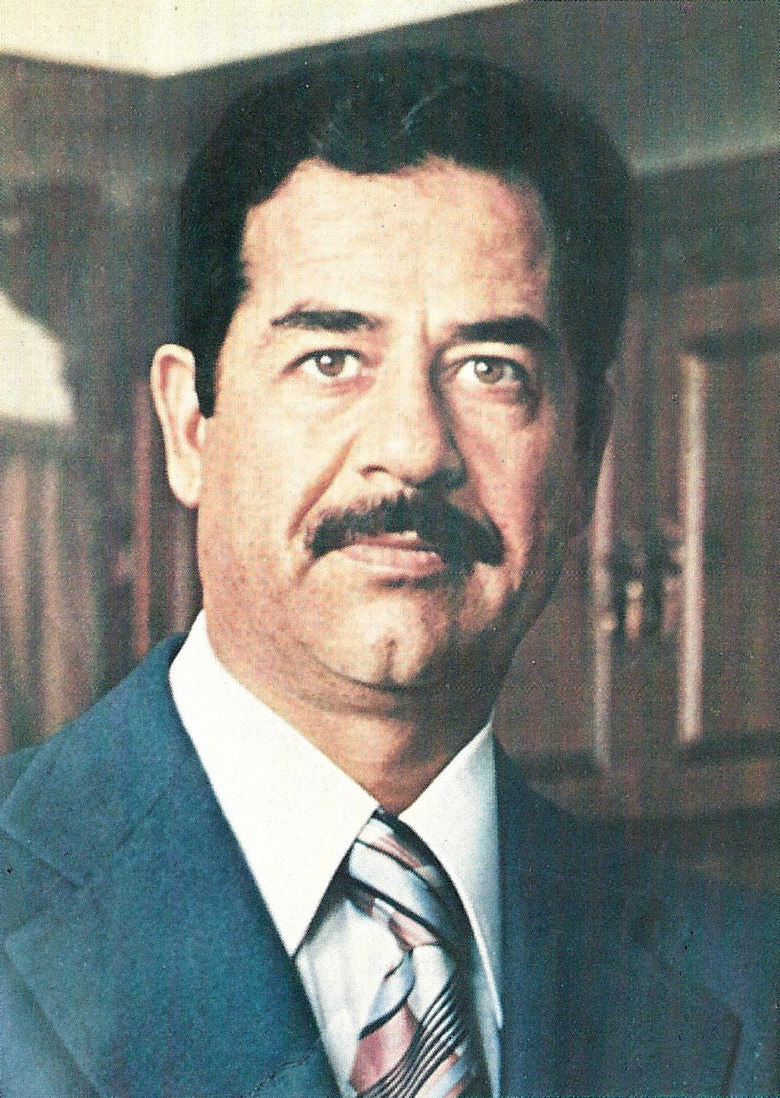
Saddam Hussein

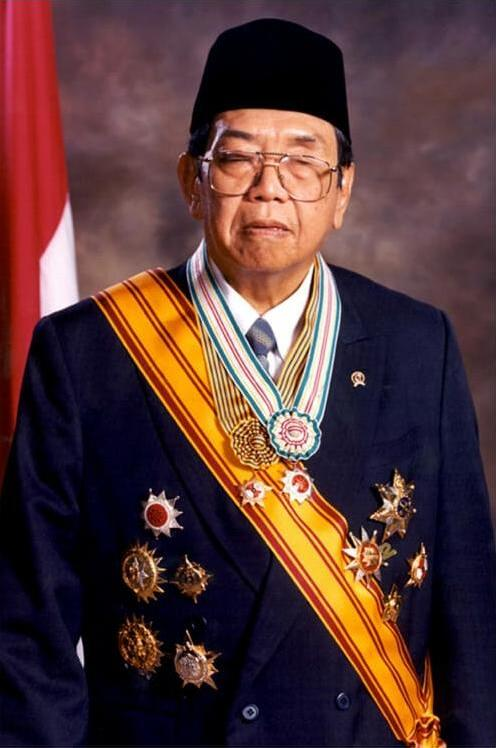
Abdurrahman Wahid

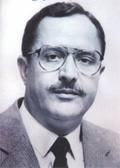
Ahmad Obeida

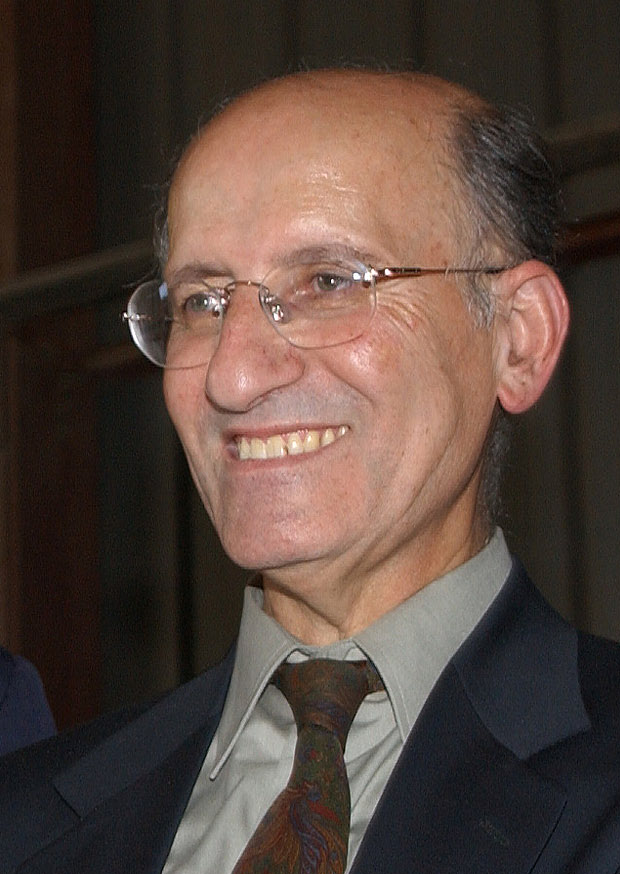
Sinan Al Shabibi

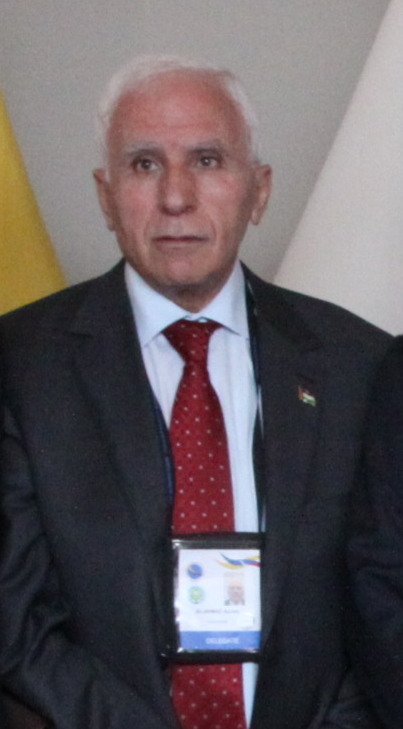
Azzam al-Ahmad

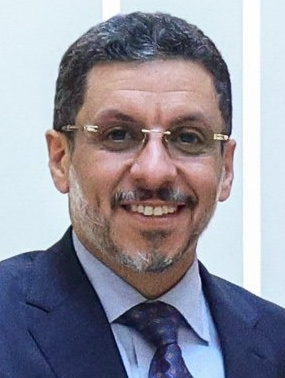
Ahmad Awad bin Mubarak

=== Science and technology ===
- Ali Aldabbagh, businessman and government spokesperson
- Hisham N. Ashkouri – architect
- Emad Zaki Yehya, international petroleum consultant and former president of Reservoir Engineering in the Ministry of Oil
- Rihab Taha – biological weapons chief; part of Saddam Hussein's biological weapons program
- Ghanim Al-Jumaily – Professor of Engineering at Southern New Hampshire University; former Ambassador of Iraq to Saudi Arabia
- Mushtak Al-Atabi - professor of mechanical engineering
- Wissam S. al-Hashimi – geologist
- Muhammad N. S. Hadi - professor of Engineering
- Jala Makhzoumi – faculty of architecture and landscape at the University of Technology, Baghdad
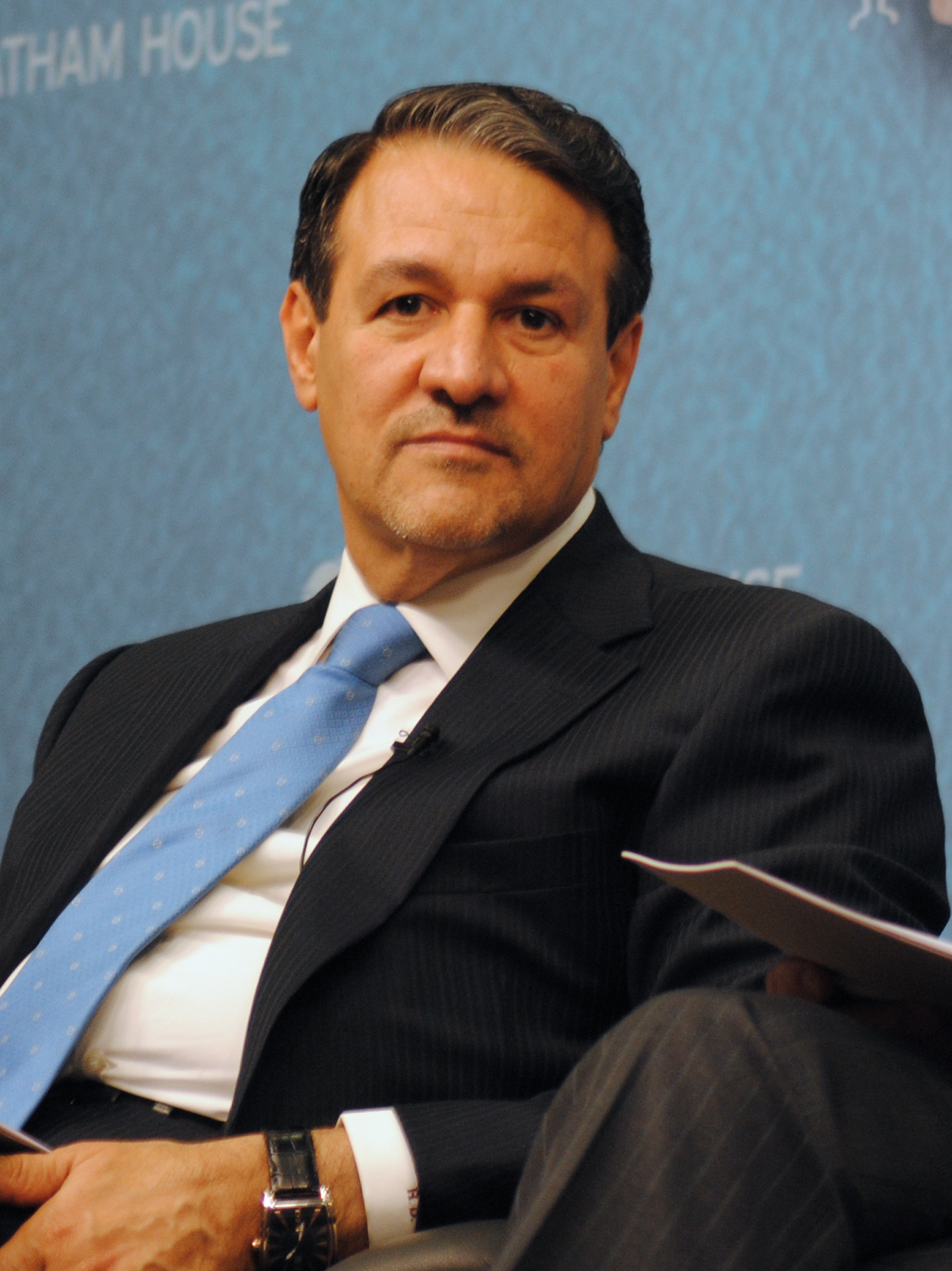
Ali Aldabbagh

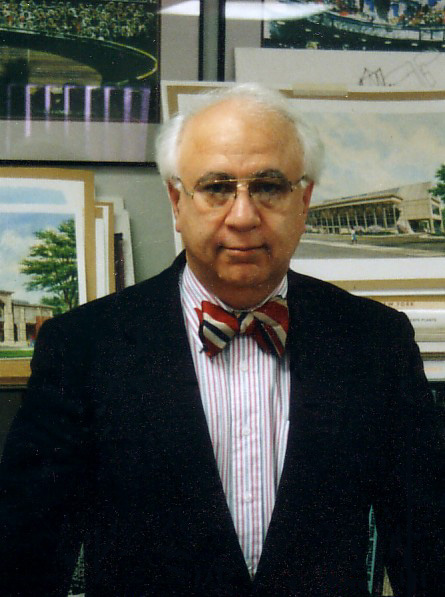
Hisham N. Ashkouri

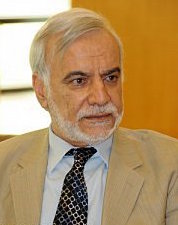
Ghanim Al-Jumaily

=== Medicine ===
- Aqeel al-Mosawi – dentist, novelist, and photographer
- Nozad Saleh Rifaat
- Salih al-Hasnawi
- Raad Shakir
- Omar Fakhri

=== Media ===
- Suad Jawad – "The Queen of Dubbing"
- Salwa Jarrah – author and BBC Arabic broadcaster

=== Scholar and research ===
- Donny George Youkhanna – archaeologist
- Hazim Abdallah Khedr - historian and researcher specialized in Andalusian Arabic literature.

=== Literature and arts ===
- Venus Faiq (born 1963), Iraqi-Kurd Dutch writer, journalist, and poet.
- Naziha Salim
- Ghassan Muhsen – diplomat and artist
- Suad al-Attar
- Muzaffar Al-Nawab – Iraqi poet and writer

== Notable development consultants ==
- Cyril Saunders, UNESCO Library Development consultant, 1952–1955
- Harold Bonny, UNESCO Library Development consultant, 1957–1958
- Donald Powell (University of Arizona), USAID/ICA Library Development consultant at Abu Ghraib College, 1957
- William S. Dix (Librarian, University of Princeton), Ford Foundation Library Development consultant, 1958
- Des Raj Kalia, UNESCO Library Development consultant, 1959–1960
- Stephen Ford (University of Michigan) and Paul Kebabian (New York Public Library), Ford Foundation Library Development consultants, 1961–1962.
- Rudolph Gjelsness (Professor and Head of the Department of Library Science, University of Michigan), Ford Foundation Library Development consultant, 1962–1963
- David T. Wilder (University Librarian, University of Michigan – Oakland), Ford Foundation Library Development consultant, 1965–66
- Anand P. Srivastava (Head of the Department of Library Science, University of Rajasthan), UNESCO consultant, Graduate School of Library Science, 1968–1973
- Khalil M. H. Al-Shamma', Former Dean, College of Administration, Business and Economy, Reorganization of the University of Baghdad and The Higher Education sector, 1969, Donated his rich personal library with its complete furniture to the Central Library of the University of Baghdad /Al-Jadriya Campus 2012.

== See also ==
- List of Islamic educational institutions
- College of Science – University of Baghdad
- Iraqi Journal of Physics
- List of universities in Iraq
