= Saudi Medical Journal =

- Discipline: Medicine
- Language: English
- Edited by: Mov

Publication details
- History: 1979-present
- Frequency: Monthly
- Open access: Yes
- Impact factor: 1.484 (2021)

Standard abbreviations
- ISO 4: Saudi Med. J.

Indexing
- ISSN: 0379-5284 (print); 1658-3175 (web)
- OCLC no.: 5237763

Links
- Journal homepage; Past Issues

The Saudi Medical Journal is a monthly peer-reviewed medical journal. It is an open access journal, with content released under a Creative Commons attribution-noncommercial license.

The journal publishes original research articles, review articles, Systematic Reviews, Case Reports, Brief Communication, Brief Report, Clinical Note, Clinical Image, Editorials, Book Reviews, Correspondence, and Student Corner.

== Indexing and abstracting ==
According to the Journal Citation Reports, the journal had a 2014 impact factor of 0.588. The journal has been in the Thomson-Reuters database since 1992. The journal is indexed in the following bibliographic databases:

- Saudi Medical Journal is a member of the Committee on Publication Ethics (COPE)
- MEDLINE/Index Medicus (National Library of Medicine) available through PubMed
- PubMed Central
- Europe PMC
- EMR Index Medicus
- Excerpta Medica Database (EMBASE)
- BIOBASE

== Editors ==
- Founding Editor: Abd El-Hameed El-Faraidi (1979-1999)
- Previous Editors-In-Chief:
  - John Muir (1980-1984)
  - Rasheed Al-Kuhaymi (1984-1991)
  - David A. Price Evans (1983-1993)
  - Basim A. Yaqub (1995-2004)
  - Saleh M. Al-Deeb (1994-2009)
  - Saud Al-Omani (2009-2012)
  - Ali AlBarrak (2012-2015)

== History ==
The journal was established in 1979. In 1985 publishing was transferred from London to Riyadh, Kingdom of Saudi Arabia.
