= Imad Sarsam =

Iraqi surgeon

Imad Sarsam (also transliterated: Emad) was an orthopaedic surgeon. He was assassinated in 2004.

His qualifications included the FRCS (UK), D.Sc (Ortho.) and M.B.Ch.B.
