= Nozad Saleh Rifaat =

Iraqi Kurdish physician and politician, former member of the Council of Representatives

- نەوزاد ساڵح ڕەفعەت
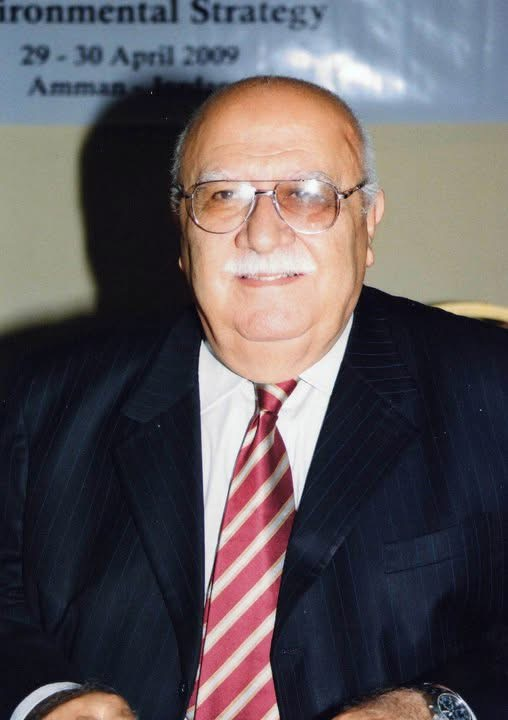
- Rifaat in 2009.

Member of the 2005 Iraqi Transitional National Assembly
- In office January 2005 – December 2005

Member of the Council of Representatives of Iraq
- In office December 2005 – 2010

Chair of the Health and Environment Committee (Iraq)
- In office December 2005 – 2010

Personal details
- Born: November 24, 1941 (age 84) Sulaymaniyah, Iraq
- Occupation: Physician; politician

Nozad Saleh Rifaat (Kurdish: نەوزاد ساڵح ڕەفعەت; Arabic: نوزاد صالح رفعت; also transliterated Nawzad Saleh Rifaat) is an Iraqi Kurdish physician and politician. A member of the Patriotic Union of Kurdistan, he served as Minister of Health of the Kurdistan Regional Government and as chair of the Parliamentary Health and Environment Committee in the Council of Representatives of Iraq representing the Democratic Patriotic Alliance of Kurdistan in the 2005 elections.

== Early life and education ==
Rifaat was born on 24 November 1941 in the Goyija neighbourhood of Sulaymaniyah, Iraq. In 1961 he enrolled in the College of Medicine at the University of Baghdad.

While in medical school, though, Rifaat became engaged in political activity: he joined the Kurdistan Democratic Party in 1961 and by 1963—his second year—he was arrested and held for several months by the National Guard following the coup of that year. He graduated with his medical degree in 1967.

Early in his residency at the Baghdad Ministry of Health, Rifaat was assigned to Karama Hospital in Baghdad. There he worked in internal medicine for three months, then opted to spend nine months in the surgical department, expressing a strong preference for surgical work. He then chose to be posted to Mandali district hospital—an ethnically mixed, underserved border area east of Baghdad—where he served for two years and nine months, regularly treating nearly a hundred patients a day and providing out‑of‑hours service often without charge.

Rifaat requested a transfer from Mandali to Sulaymaniyah to avoid proximity to the Ba’athist regime's authority. Upon returning to Kurdistan, he assumed a critical role in the Kurdish revolutionary movement, providing medical care to injured Peshmerga fighters in secret, he also helped smuggle medicines and other essential medical supplies to remote mountainous areas and frontline positions, often under hazardous conditions and constant risk of detection.

== Political career ==
He was elected to the Iraqi Council of Representatives in 2005 as part of the Kurdistan Alliance. He later chaired the Parliamentary Health and Environment Committee, appearing in news coverage for his comments on Iraq's cholera response and public health policies. He was frequently quoted by Arabic and Kurdish media outlets on health issues and legislative reforms.

In 2004, Rifaat was elected by a Kaka'i delegation as the representative of Jalal Talabani among the Kaka'i community, serving as a liaison between the Kurdish president and the minority group.

In June 2004, Rifaat was listed as a member of the Higher Commission for Preparing the Iraqi National Conference, representing Sulaymaniyah among the 99 members tasked with preparing the expanded national conference.

=== Parliamentary work and public statements ===
In 2005, Rifaat publicly responded to statements by the Secretary-General of the Arab League regarding the draft Iraqi constitution, defending the recognition of Iraq's multi-ethnic and multi-religious composition, and emphasizing the Kurdish nation's rights within Iraq. He criticized proposals that would have implied all Iraqi citizens should be considered part of a single Arab nation, highlighting the presence of Kurds, Assyrians, Chaldeans, and other communities. Rifaat connected these issues to democratic principles, human rights, and the importance of Iraq's unity while acknowledging its diverse ethnic and religious composition.

In November 2005, Rifaat publicly advocated for journalist protections in Iraq, stressing that parliamentary committees had the mandate to develop and implement legislation safeguarding press freedom particularly in light of the increasing threats and violence faced by media personnel during that period.

In January 2007, Rifaat, representing the Kurdistan Alliance bloc in the Iraqi Parliament, remarked on the challenges limiting Peshmerga participation in the national security plan, stressing the importance of safeguarding Kurdistan's security and ensuring the Kurdistan region's strategic interests were considered in Iraq's broader defense framework.

During the fifteenth regular session of the Iraqi Council of Representatives on 21 October 2008, Nozad Saleh, serving as Chairman of the Health and Environment Committee, delivered an official statement to parliament concerning Iraq's participation in the 55th Session of the World Health Organization (WHO) Regional Committee for the Eastern Mediterranean. Saleh participated in the session alongside the Iraqi Minister of Health at the time.

In September 2008, Rifaat, serving as the head of the newly established Iraqi Parliament office in Sulaymaniyah and a member of the Iraqi Parliament representing the Kurdistan Alliance bloc, inaugurated the office. The office aimed to facilitate communication between citizens of Sulaymaniyah and the national parliament, allowing local concerns, proposals, and issues to be conveyed directly.
