= University of Technology, Iraq =

Public university in Baghdad, Iraq

Coordinates: 33.311°N 44.447°E

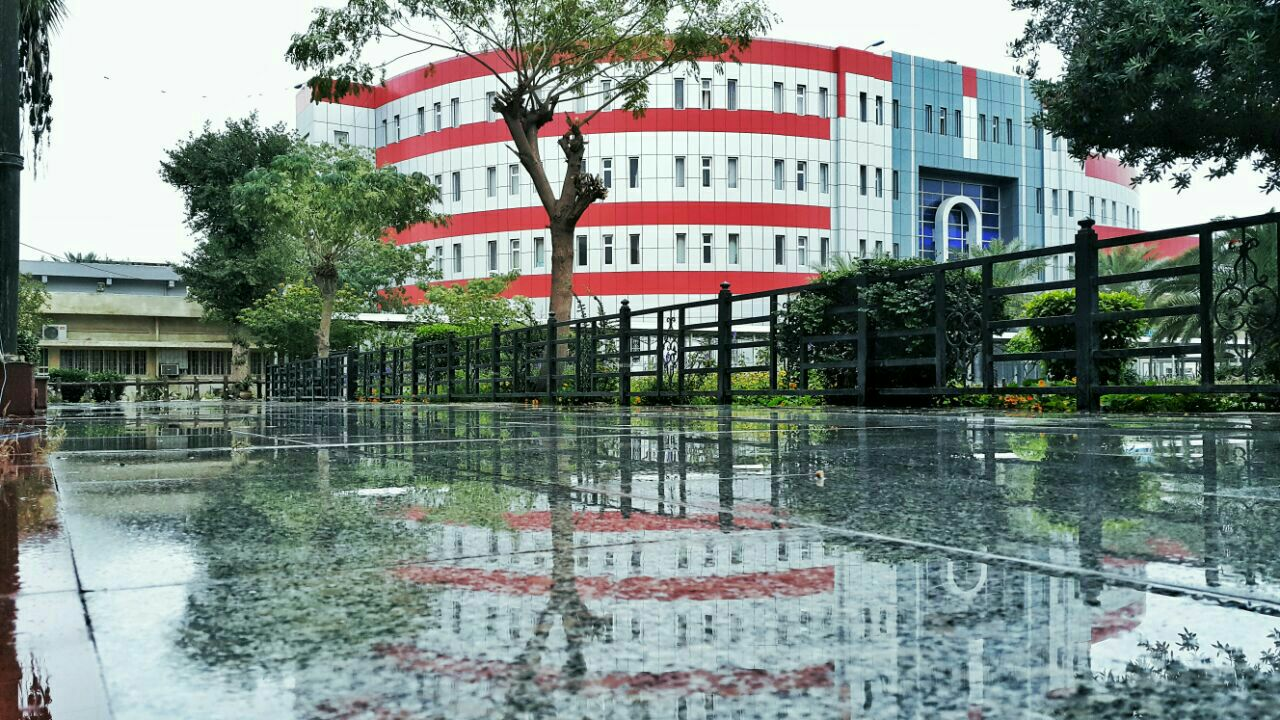
- Type: Public University
- Established: 1975
- President: Prof. Dr. Muhsin Nouri Hamza
- Location: Baghdad, Iraq
- Campus: Urban
- Website: www.uotechnology.edu.iq

The University of Technology, Iraq is one of Iraq's largest universities. It is situated in the city of Baghdad, Iraq. The university specialises in engineering, computer sciences and applied sciences and technologies. It was established in 1975.

== History ==
The university started with steady scientific achievements. It was established in 1960 with the idea of establishing an Institute of Industrial Teachers, outlined by the Ministry of Education in cooperation with UNESCO, the founding of the Institute was declared on 22 January 1960, The course of studies was limited to five years after acquiring the high school graduate Certificate, in the subject of Engineering Applications, the first batch was accepted with 45 male students, all of whom were graduates of Industrial secondary Schools . Since founding, the objectives of the Institute were identified by the need for Engineering Technologists, to work in the industrial sector, with emphasis on Engineering projects and Applications research labs, it was also charged with the task of preparing teachers to train professionals in the Industrial and Professional trades, aiming to solve the problems of availability of trainers and workers in those trades, and enabling specialists to manage departments and laboratories . The introduction of specialized learning sessions at the institute, was directed through recommendations and instructions of the Presiding Council of the Institute, and approved by the Ministry of Education. As founded the Institute included the following sections:

- Department of Materials Engineering
- Department of Mechanical Engineering
- Department of Automotive Engineering
- Department of Electrical Engineering
- Department of Civil Engineering
- Department of Manufacturing Engineering and Assembly

The name of the institute was changed, a few months after its inception, to the Higher Institute of Industrial Engineering, then subsequently renamed after an order by the Ministry of Higher Education, due to its increased importance and to reflect its advancement, and in agreement with UNESCO in 1967, to The Higher College of Industrial Engineering and subsequently amended to the college of Engineering Technology, while simultaneously annexed to the University of Baghdad, Final disengagement of the Faculty from the University of Baghdad, was issued by The decision to establish the University of Technology on 1 April 1975, by a Presidential Decree.

== Academics ==
The University is composed of the following colleges and specializations:

- Mechanical Engineering
- Electrical and Electronics Engineering
- Civil Engineering
- Control and Systems Engineering
- Industrial and Metallurgy Engineering
- Chemical Engineering
- Architecture Engineering
- Applied Sciences (Applied Physics, Applied Mathematics, Laser, Material Science, Biotechnology, Applied Chemistry and Industrial Management)
- Computer Science
- Computers Engineering
- Materials Engineering
- Laser and Opticelectronics Engineering
- Petroleum Technology Engineering
- Electromechanical Engineering

The University also has three research centers:

- The Environmental Research Center
- Energy Research Center
- Nanotechnology and Advanced Materials Research Center

The University has many modern buildings. It has multiple coffee centers/cafeterias and two very large Internet centers. There are also a large gym center, two football (soccer) fields, a mosque, and a 13 different factories/shops for more practical experience for the students. The University also has a large central library. It is located on Al Sina'a Street in Baghdad's east side.

== See also ==
- List of Islamic educational institutions
- Category:University of Technology, Iraq alumni
- List of universities in Iraq
