= Saib Shawkat =

Iraqi doctor and politician

- صائب شوكت
- Shawkat before his death

Personal details
- Born: 1898 Baghdad, Ottoman Iraq, Ottoman Empire
- Died: 13 February 1984 (aged 85–86) Baghdad, Iraq
- Party: Nadi al-Muthanna
- Relatives: Naji Shawkat (brother)

Saib Shawkat (Arabic: صائب شوكت; 1898 – 13 February 1984) was an Iraqi doctor and politician who was an Arab nationalist leader in Iraq.

== Medical career ==
He was from an upscale patriotic Baghdadian family of Georgian origin and studied at a medical school in Istanbul 1913–1918, completing post-graduate studies in general surgery in Germany. Shawkat was the first Iraqi doctor to teach anatomy at the Iraqi Royal College of Medicine of which he became the dean later in the 1940s. He was one of the pioneers in general surgery in Iraq, serving as Director General of Baghdad Hospital in the 1930s. In 1932 he became a founding committee member of the Iraqi Red Crescent Society. He attended King Ghazi after the car accident preceding his death.

== Politics ==
Shawkat led the Arab nationalist Nadi al-Muthanna and advocating the expulsion of Jews from Iraq. Such claims about Dr. Shwakat's attitude toward Jews are contradicted by his personal heroism in defending Jewish patients at the Baghdad hospital where he worked.

Hayim Habousha in his account of the pogrom (Farhud) writes:

On June 1, 1941, Dr. Saib Shawkat, Dean of the Baghdad Medical College, chief of surgery and administrator of Baghdad Central Hospital entered the surgery ward and scrubbed his hands getting ready to operate. Doctors and nurses standing idly by, had no option but to follow his example. In a few hours, all patients (mostly Jews) were attended to and moved into clean beds. When Jewish nurses reported threats of rape by Iraqi wounded officers being treated at the hospital, Dr. Shawkat sent the officers to their beds and warned on the megaphone that anyone disobeying his order would be shot by him with two guns at his belt. There was no argument--everyone obeyed.

== Family ==
Saib Shawkat was the brother of politician Naji Shawkat, who served as Prime Minister of Iraq from 1932 to 1933.
