= College of Medicine University of Baghdad =

Medical school in Iraq

College of Medicine, University of Baghdad
- كلية الطب جامعة بغداد
- Former name: Royal College of Medicine of Iraq
- Type: Public
- Established: January 1, 1927
- Founder: Harry Sinderson
- Parent institution: University of Baghdad
- Location: Baghdad, Iraq; 33.3462°N 44.3775°E
- Campus: Urban
- Language: English (Instruction)

The College of Medicine University of Baghdad, formerly known as the Iraqi Royal Medical College, was established in 1927.

In 1927, Harry Sinderson helped to establish a new medical school in Baghdad, which became the Royal Medical College when King Faisal I opened its new building in April 1930. From 1923, Sinderson was personal physician to Iraq's Kings. Sinderson served as Dean of the Medical College from 1927 until 1934, and again from 1941 until 1946.

The current dean is Dr.Ameen Al-Alwani
