= Öztürk =

Öztürk (pronounced [ˈœztyɾc]), meaning 'core Turk', is a common Turkish masculine name and surname.

== Given name ==
- Öztürk Karataş (born 1991), Turkish footballer
- Öztürk Serengil (1930–1999), Turkish actor and comedian
- Öztürk Türkdoğan (born 1969), Turkish lawyer, activist and politician
- Öztürk Yılmaz (born 1970), Turkish diplomat and politician

== Surname ==
- Abdullah Öztürk (born 1989), Turkish para table tennis player
- Akın Öztürk (born 1952), Turkish general
- Ali Öztürk (footballer, born 1986), Turkish footballer
- Ali Öztürk (footballer, born 1987), Turkish footballer
- Ali Öztürk (para table tennis) (born 1993), Turkish para table tennis player
- Ali İsmet Öztürk (born 1964), Turkish aerobatics pilot
- Alim Öztürk (born 1992), Turkish footballer
- Alpaslan Öztürk (born 1993), Turkish footballer
- Atacan Öztürk (born 1982), Turkish footballer
- Aykut Öztürk (born 1987), Turkish footballer
- Bahadır Öztürk (born 1995), Turkish footballer
- Barbara Turner (basketball) (born 1984), known in Turkey as Bahar Öztürk, American basketball player and coach
- Basat Öztürk (born 1963), Turkish diplomat
- Berdan Öztürk (born 1980), Turkish politician
- Beyazıt Öztürk (born 1969), Turkish television personality
- Bilgenur Öztürk (born 1999), Turkish handball player
- Bora Öztürk (1955–1997), Turkish footballer
- Buket Öztürk (born 2001), Turkish female bocce player
- Bülent Öztürk (born 1975), Belgian-Turkish director and screenwriter
- Dilek Öztürk (born 2001), Turkish long-distance runner
- Ekrem Öztürk (born 1997), Turkish wrestler
- Engin Öztürk (born 1986), Turkish actor
- Emre Öztürk (footballer, born 1986), German footballer
- Emre Öztürk (footballer, born 1992), Turkish footballer
- Erdal Öztürk (born 1996), German footballer
- Erkan Öztürk (born 1983), Turkish-German footballer
- Eslem Öztürk (born 1997), Turkish footballer
- Fadıl Öztürk (born 1955), Kurdish writer and poet
- Fatih Öztürk (born 1983), Turkish footballer
- Fatih Öztürk (born 1986), Turkish footballer
- Gökhan Öztürk (born 1990), Turkish footballer
- Gülüstan Öztürk (1980/81–1993), victim of the 1993 Solingen arson attack
- Halis Öztürk (1888–1977), Kurdish chieftain and Turkish politician
- Hilal Öztürk (born 2002), Turkish judoka
- Hüseyin Öztürk (born 1928), Turkish basketball player
- İbrahim Öztürk (born 1981), Turkish footballer
- İnci Ece Öztürk (born 1997), Turkish bocce
- Lale Öztürk (born 1971), Turkish runner
- Korhan Öztürk (born 1982), Turkish footballer
- Kübra Öztürk (born 1991), Turkish Woman Grand Master chess player
- Kurtulus Öztürk (born 1980), Turkish-German footballer
- Leyla Öztürk (born 1991), Turkish hockey player
- Mehlika Öztürk (born 1997), Turkish wrestler
- Mehmet Gürkan Öztürk (born 1989), Turkish footballer
- Melike Öztürk (born 2001), Turkish footballer
- Mertan Caner Öztürk (born 1992), Turkish footballer
- Mevlüde Öztürk (born 1988), Turkish footballer
- Murat Öztürk (footballer) (born 1969), Turkish football coach
- Murat Öztürk (aviator) (1953–2013), Turkish aerobatic pilot
- Mustafa Öztürk (born 1965), Turkish theologian and academic
- Nergis Öztürk (born 1980), Turkish actress
- Okan Öztürk (born 1977), Turkish footballer
- Özhan Öztürk (born 1968), Turkish writer
- Ramazan Öztürk (born 1992), Turkish badminton player
- Recep Öztürk (born 1977), Turkish footballer
- Remzi Öztürk (born 1964), Turkish wrestler
- Renan Öztürk (born 1980), Turkish-American mountaineer
- Rümeysa Öztürk (born 1994/95), Turkish student detained by immigration authorities in the United States in 2025
- Sebahattin Öztürk (born 1962), Turkish politician and civil servant
- Sebahattin Öztürk (wrestler) (born 1969), Turkish wrestler
- Selçuk Öztürk (born 1972), Dutch politician
- Selen Öztürk (born 1980), Turkish actress
- Semin Öztürk Şener (born 1991), Turkish aerobatics pilot
- Sevilay Öztürk (born 2003), Turkish Paralympic swimmer
- Seyfi Öztürk (1927–2002), Turkish lawyer and politician
- Sezer Öztürk (born 1985), Turkish footballer
- Sinem Öztürk (born 1985), Turkish actress
- Tanju Öztürk (born 1989), Turkish-German footballer
- Tuğba Hezer Öztürk (born 1989), Kurdish politician
- Yaşar Nuri Öztürk (1945–2016), Turkish theologian, lawyer, columnist
- Yusuf Öztürk (boxer) (born 1973), Turkish boxer
- Yusuf Öztürk (footballer) (born 1979), Turkish footballer
- Zeki Öztürk (born 1965), Turkish runner
