= Quranic hermeneutics =

Study of theories of the interpretation and understanding of the Quran

Hermeneutics (/hɜːrməˈnjuːtɪks/) is the theory and methodology of interpretation, especially the interpretation of biblical texts, wisdom literature, and philosophical texts on the basis of art of -secular- understanding and communication. Modern hermeneutics includes both verbal and non-verbal communication, as well as semiotics, presuppositions, and pre-understandings. Hermeneutics has been broadly applied in the humanities, especially in law, history and theology. The terms hermeneutics and exegesis are sometimes used interchangeably. While hermeneutics is a wider discipline which includes written, verbal, and nonverbal communication, exegesis (tafsir) focuses primarily upon the word and grammar of texts.

From the early centuries of Islam, scholars of diverse backgrounds and leanings have conducted mainly literal tafsir (exegesis) studies —carried out within the framework of the faith— aimed at interpreting verses and deriving rulings from them; they have categorized the verses into two fundamental groups: Muhkamat (clear and unambiguous verses) and Mutashabihat (verses with ambiguous or multifaceted meanings). These tendencies are also reflected in the emergence of different Islamic sects at the intellectual level; The three primarily established typologies of tafsir are Tafsir bi'r-Riwayah (sunni), tafsir bi-al-diraya (Shi'i; Opinion), and allegory (Sufi). The traditional approach to Quranic exegesis relies heavily on narrations supported by a chain of transmission (isnad).

A cedar in Lebanon (Lebanon's sacred tree); Translations made through modern Arabic, unaware of the socio-cultural background and etymological development of the words and symbols that make up the language, can turn Quranic Sidrat al-Muntaha into the Lote tree.

Many of the traditional methods of interpretation are currently being challenged with a more modern or contemporary approaches. There are many challenges of addressing modern day human rights, women and minority groups through the traditional exegesis. The hermeneutical model can be considered an expanded approach to the classical concept of "interpretation through reason" or "tafsir bi-al-dirayah" and questioning. On the other hand, Tafsir as described by Andrew Rippin "is the humanization of the divine word and the divinization of the human spirit." Therefore, hermeneutical analyses, in contrast to tafsir, can be seen as an attempt to understand the text through a more secular approach, from a social sciences perspective. Stories containing mysterious or –according to traditional interpretations– supernatural elements, such as the Muqatta'at letters, the story of Solomon, Dhul-Qarnayn, and Ya'juc and Ma'juj, Taghut etc can be shed on lights so they gain meaningful processes by which these stories become legends through a serious cultural-anthropological background study. Furthermore, considering the findings of the revisionist school of Islamic studies, it is clear that the expression of certain narrative concepts in the Quran that refer to places, people, and events (such as Quraysh, Ababil, and Abu Lahab) in a single word or a few short sentences will require new interpretations and meanings that differ from the traditional narrative within this framework of understanding.

== Introduction ==
Abdullahi Ahmed An-Na'im suggests "the diversity of Sunni, Shi'a, and Sufi Muslims schools of thought signify differences in the hermeneutical framework." "In view of the inevitability of using human reason and action in understanding and implementing any text, a hermeneutical process is necessary for understanding the purpose and normative content of a text like the Qur'an." The two leading concepts are interpretation and understanding. Interpretation is a rational activity directed toward the cognitive aim of correct or adequate understanding. (The product of this activity is also called ‘an interpretation.) ‘To interpret’ and ‘to understand’ are transitive verbs; understanding, like interpretation, has an object. One understands something (x), or one fails to understand it. Sometimes we understand something without effort, simply because we have acquired the requisite ability, and nothing more is needed.

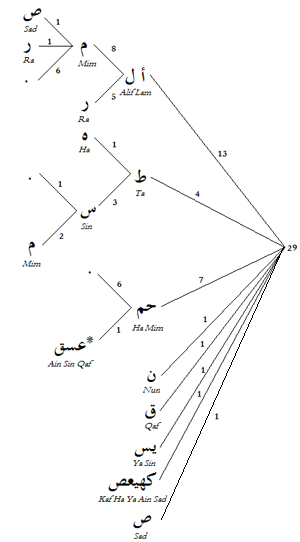
Qur'anic initial letters, explanatory information regarding the meaning of these letters could only be provided by some researchers through the socio-cultural environment and literary context in which the verses were written.

Amina Wadud defines the hermeneutical model as being, "concerned with three aspects of the text, in order to support its conclusions:

1. The context in which the text was written (in the case of the Qur'an, in which it was revealed);

2. The grammatical composition of the text (how it says what it says); and

3. The whole text, its Weltanschauung, or world-view. Often, differences of opinion can be traced to variations in emphasis between these three aspects".

Peter Heath posed in 1989 that "the modern study of Islamic hermeneutics is in its infancy"; in response, Jean Jacques Waardenburg proposed five questions and issues that a study of a possible hermeneutics of Islam would have to deal with:

1. Is there a consistent methodology underlying tafsir that one could call hermeneutical, do rules exist "that have been explicitly formulated and consciously applied by Muslim scholars"?
2. Given that much of the tradition of interpretation of the Qur'an is concerned with the interpretation of specific verses, what is the relationship between those interpretations and the interpretation of the Qur'an as a whole?
3. What type of philological knowledge, and what type of knowledge of the historical reception of the text is necessary to come to an assessment of Islamic hermeneutics?
4. Can we separate our emotional response to certain verses from the study of the meaning of the text?
5. What is the role of the specialists in the field (the mutakallimiin, the ulama, and the fuqahā') and what is their relationship to the broader circle of students of the Qur'an and the even larger community of believers?

Abdullah Saeed says "Among Muslims, three broad approaches may be identified in relation to the interpretation of ethico-legal content of the Qur'an in the modern period: Textualist, Semi-textualist and Contextualist." He suggest one aspect of interpretation belongs to ethico-legal content. "Examples of ethico-legal content include belief in God, prophets and life after death; regulations related to marriage, divorce and inheritance; what is permitted and prohibited; commandments relating to fasting, spending, jihad and hudud; prohibitions related to theft, dealing with non-Muslims; instructions relating to etiquette, inter-faith relations and governance. In chapter 1 of his book the importance of interpretation of the Quran for modern times and modern needs are highlighted. (“The thrust of my argument, therefore, is towards a more flexible approach to interpretation of these texts by taking into consideration both the socio-historical context of the Quran at the time of revelation in the first/seventh century and the contemporary concerns and needs of Muslims today.

== Criticism of traditional interpretation ==
Sharia rulings derived from inferences made using the mentality and methods of the past create problems today in many areas such as human rights, democracy, the protection of children from sexual acts, gender equality, and freedom of thought and belief and expressions as well. Contextualism rejects the idea of interpreting many Quranic and hadith texts, which refer to attitudes exhibited in past societal models, beyond "statements made in a historical context" in the face of changing human nature and culture, and especially rejects deriving binding rulings from them in the present day. Mustafa Öztürk who describes himself as a historicist-contextualist, defines secularism as the lifeline of society and explains the necessity of absolutely no compromise on it with an example: According to Sharia, slaves/female slaves were considered property; they could be bought and sold, inherited, rented, and shared. He includes a fatwa by al-Sarakhsi stating that the paternity of a child born from such a sharing could be determined by drawing lots, and asks: How many of you today would accept this understanding?

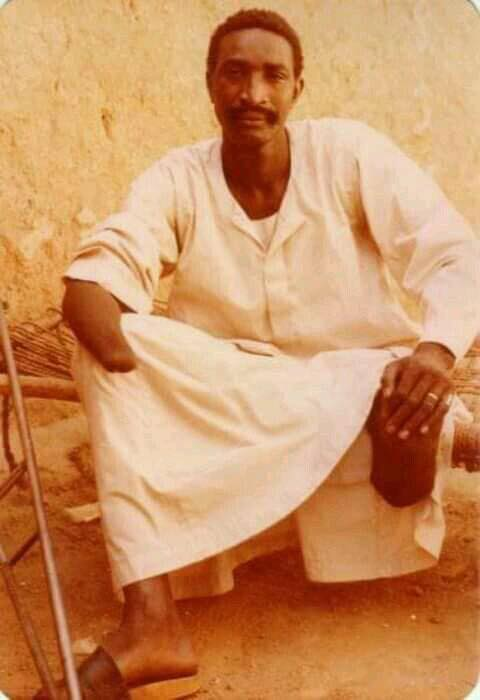
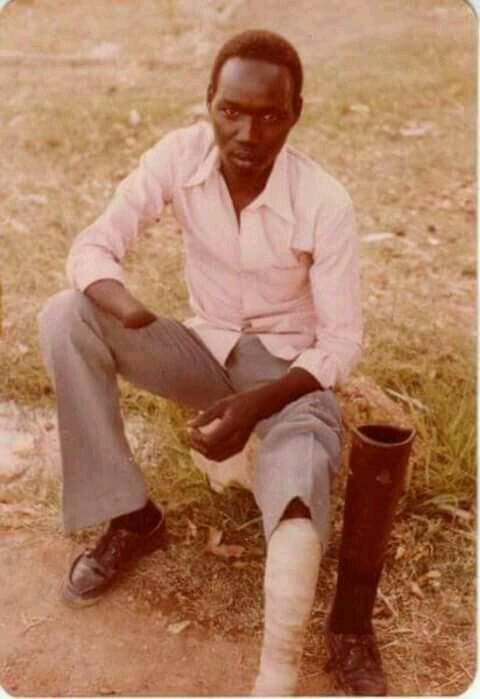
Cross amputation survivors, 1983 Sudan; The consequences of accepting the Quran as a source of law and interpreting it literally: "The punishment for those who declared war on God and the Prophet was to have their hands and feet cut off crosswise." (Al-Ma'idah 33) A concrete punishment for an abstract crime.

The Qur’an is an authoritative text in Islamic communities, and even though there are many different interpretations of the text, stereotypical societal structures still exist in the changing modern world, perhaps because they have not been challenged in prior interpretations. Zayn R. Kassam adds to this by stating that, “The discursive hermeneutics of Qur’anic tafsir is a strategy born of necessity and the unwavering belief in the unfulfilled promise of gender egalitarianism in Islam”. The growing influence of women in the Muslim world and their increasing access to higher levels of education, combined with the Western interest in the position of women in the Muslim world has a profound influence on Islamic hermeneutics, which must deal with transnationalism and its effect on gender roles. Zayn R. Kassam touches on this by mentioning that, "Muslim women's praxis, particularly the hopes, possibilities, and challenges that accompany this scholarly textual reinterpretation, remains under-researched". Due to this type of interpretation being under-researched, many women in Islamic communities are still oppressed despite the changing of modern society. 'New' schools of Islamic thinking (emblematized by such philosophers as Mohammed Arkoun) have challenged "monodimensional hermeneutics." Modern Qur’anic hermeneutics has been influenced by the changing position and view of women in the Muslim world and increasing numbers of study and interpretations of the text itself. Mohammed Arkoun further expands on this thought explaining, "There are concrete examples how authority and power are conquered, monopolized and translated, not in the theoretical classical frameworks, but in a more simplified vocabulary, accessible to the illiterate peasants, mountain-dwellers and nomads."

Interpretation of the Qur’an in terms of gender rights is becoming more prevalent, especially due to the many changes taking place in modern times concerning gender and other minority or oppressed groups. In terms of these approaches to interpretation, and the hermeneutical model being developed for it, Amina Wadud, is one who can be considered a significant developer. For example, in her analysis, in the context of the creation story in the Qur'an, states that, "The Qur'an encourages all believers, male and female, to follow their beliefs with actions, and for this it promises them a great reward. Thus, the Qur'an does not make a distinction between men and women in this creation, the purpose of the Book, or in the reward it promises". This is an example of modern hermeneutics and the way it can be applied to this issue. Wadud considers that Arabic, the language of the Qur’an, is a gendered language, so that the meaning of certain phrases can be altered just be this factor alone. While she does use traditional tafsir in her analysis, she changes and skips some of the traditional steps, like keeping words in context while also referring to the larger textual development of the term and focusing on what is left unsaid in the Qur’an in relation to what is said. Wadud challenges the traditional hermeneutical approach and tafsir by adding to and changing the usual model. Dr. Wadud has giving us an interpretation of the Quran through a female Muslim lens. She offers a female view of women in the Quran and their importance of their teaching. She suggests that the Quran does not supply gender specific roles for either male or female. Amina states that the patriarchal construct of women’s role in the community was a self-serving one., not ordained by Quranic text. She states that the greater Quranic message is on to establish harmony within the community.

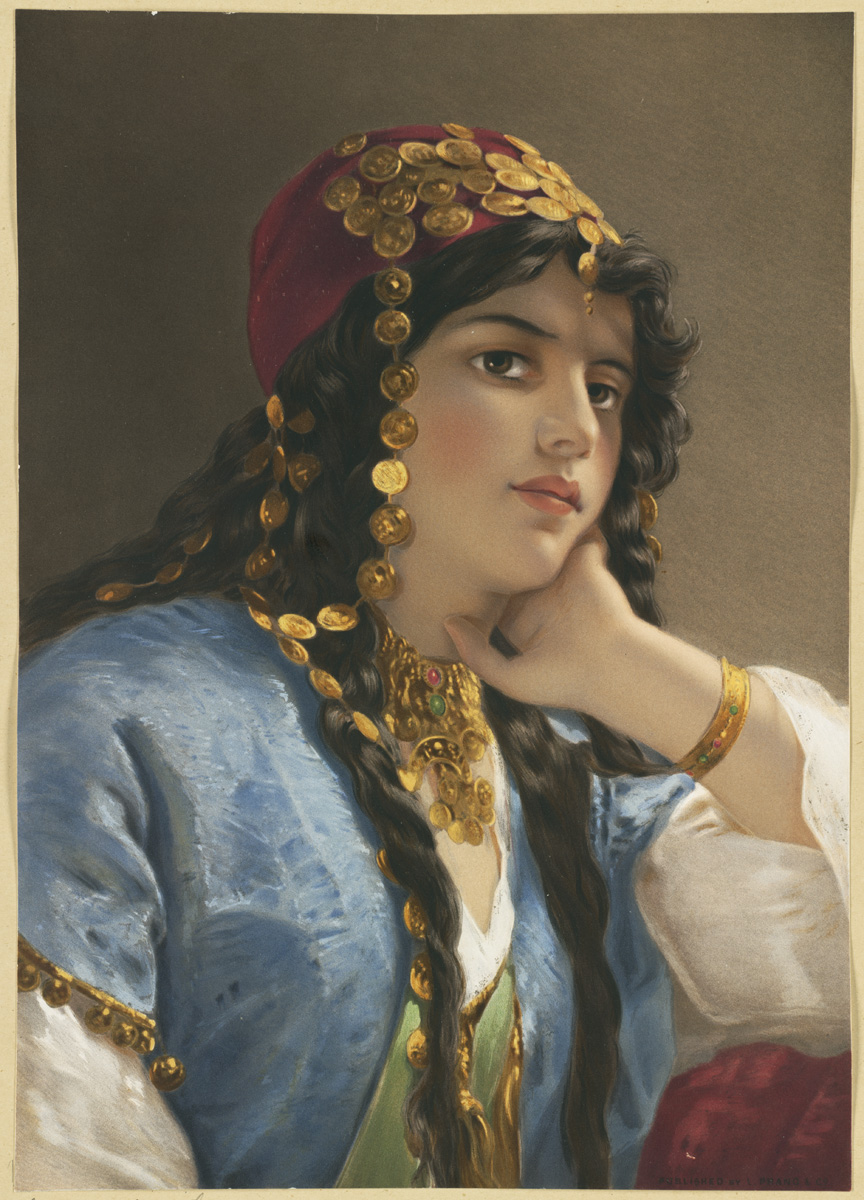
A "cariye" or Ottoman concubine, painting by Gustav Richter, In Islamic tradition, the words and testimonies of some people had no value in the face of their masters' words, and they were subject to someone's property rights. Contextualism sets forth a fundamental purpose for religion and manifests itself through a challenge that breaks down conventional patterns.

== Approaches to specific issues ==
Ijtihad: "Ijtihad Islamic legal term meaning “independent reasoning,” as opposed to taqlid (imitation). It requires a thorough knowledge of theology, revealed texts, and legal theory (usul al-fiqh); a sophisticated capacity for legal reasoning; and a thorough knowledge of Arabic. It is considered a required religious duty for those qualified to perform it. It should be practiced by means of analogical or syllogistic reasoning (qiyas). Its results may not contradict the Quran, and it may not be used in cases where consensus (ijma) has been reached, according to many scholars. Islamic reformers call for a revitalization of ijtihad in the modern world". Abdullah Saeed embraces this concept suggesting a "Contextualist" approach to interpretation. Saeed gives a description of contextualist ,"Those I refer to as Contextualists emphasize the socio-historical context of the ethico-legal content of the Quran and of its subsequent interpretations. They argue for understanding the ethico-legal content in the light of the political, social, historical, cultural and economic contexts in which this content was revealed, interpreted and applied. Thus they argue for a high degree of freedom for the modern Muslim scholar in determining what is mutable (changeable) and immutable (unchangeable) in the area of ethico-legal content. Contextualists are found among those Fazlur Rahman called neo-modernists as well as Ijtihadist, the so-called ‘progressive’ Muslims and more generally ‘liberal’ Muslim thinkers today". He emphasis understanding the socio-historical context of scripture and the complex meanings of Quranic verses. The use of abrogation for clarification and abandoning rigid interpretation from previous hermeneutic scholars loosely encompasses Saeed's approach.

'Human rights: A specific issue discussed is the relationship between Islam and human rights. ʻAbd Allāh Aḥmad Naʻīm sees the problem as one of the transformation of interpretations of the Qur'an to a globalized world and the mutual social and political influences between that globalized world and the Muslim community. He differentiates between the 'traditionalists' who advocate "strict conformity to Shari'a as an essential prerequisite for accepting the proposed change [toward a more anthropological view of Islam]" and those who do bypass the question of that conformity. A hermeneutic approach to Islam and human rights, he claims, must acknowledge the idea of historical and cultural change.

Minority Groups:Another minority group to consider in more modern interpretations of the Qur'an is queer theory or interpretations. As mentioned by Kecia Ali, "In queer theory, gender and sexual dimorphisms are social constructions that invariably efface difference, administer power to the powerful, and subject the weak/disfavored to the rule of the strong/favored" (90). In other words, Ali explains that, "Queer theoretical interventions, then, have relevance for social life: challenging the presumed coherence and sacred nature of existing oppressive norms allows other forms of being and relating to emerge and flourish" (91). Queer readings and interpretations of the Qur'an are few and far between, while there are plenty of scholarships on gender-focused interpretations of the Qur'an. A pioneering interpretive text in this field is Scott Kugle’s Homosexuality in Islam, which focuses on interpreting the Qur’an in the context of homosexuality. His hermeneutical approach mainly entails the use of linguistics, emphasis on human nature, the Qur’an as a liberation document, non- patriarchal interpretation, and bases his sensitive interpretation on seven principles required for interpretations of this sort, “(1) the inherent dignity of all human beings as bearing the breath of God; (2) the sacredness of life; (3) the ethic of pluralism; (4) order with justice; (5) God’s speech is meaningful, such that interpretation is the right and obligation of all Muslims to discover what God intends behind, within, and through scripture’s words; (6) faith complements reason; (7) love is the goal” (41). He uses these seven principles combined with specific tools, such as: (1) Linguistic accuracy; (2) maintaining the primacy of the Qur’an; (3) affirming the Qur’an’s integrity; (4) clarifying the Qur’an’s context; (5) focusing in principles; (6) restraint in rule making; (7) and embracing moral optimism. Kugle analyzes the story of Lot, which has become a primary source of contention and interpretation in the way that the attitude towards homosexuality has been constructed. During his analysis, Kugle focuses on the intention behind the acts depicted in the story and explains how they could be taken in a different way. He concludes that, “one can argue that the story of Lot is not about homosexuality at all. Rather, Lot criticizes using sex as a weapon. Lot condemns sex acts that are coercive, like rape” (56).

== Significant influencers ==
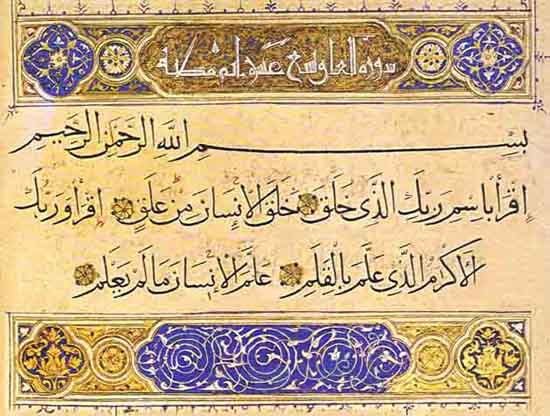
Believed to be Muhammad's first revelation, Sura Al-Alaq is placed 96th in the later Quranic arrangement. Translations of "al-‘alaq" shed light on how meanings attributed to the same text have evolved: while classical exegeses interpret the word as a "clinging clot," modern approaches translate it as "embryo." Furthermore, in C. Luxenberg's philological analyses, its meaning is rendered as "stickiness," connecting it to the clay mentioned in the Genesis creation narrative.

Al-Tabari was a Sunni scholar from the 9th and 10th century and arguably the most predominant figure in Quranic hermeneutics. Al-Tabari's traditional approach to interpretation relies heavily on the Hadith reports as a tool for clarification when the Qur'an presents a mutishabihat (ambiguous verse).

Sayyid Qutb was one such interpreter, with the main goal to revive Islam. He saw the Qur'an as a source for liberation from oppression. His egalitarian emphasis to the Qur'an was what Qutb stated as its main intended purpose. Sayyid viewed the "West" as a facade for social and political progress. He criticized the civil rights movement as a hollow example of progress, although he died in 1966.

Farid Esack, like Sayyid Qutb emphasized the oppressed as being the primary focus for the initial Qur'anic revelation. Literary analysis being the main focus for interpretation with emphasis on social justice. A main component used by Esack was his emphasis on Taqwa as an indication as to who has the greatest ability to interpret the Qur'an.

Abdulla Galadari proposed a method for Qur'anic hermeneutics that takes into account intertextual polysemy in establishing inner-Qur'anic and intra-Qur'anic-Biblical allusions by looking into the polysemous nature of the Arabic terms used and how they are related to its usage in other instances. For example, it gives insight into how the Qibla passages in the Qur'an are in direct engagement with the Shema' passages in Deuteronomy and its Talmudic commentary.
