= Yusuf Öztürk =

Yusuf Öztürk may refer to:

- Yusuf Öztürk (boxer) (born 1973), Turkish light heavyweight
- Yusuf Öztürk (footballer) (born 1979), Turkish midfielder

== See also ==
- Öztürk (name)
