= List of surviving Focke-Wulf Fw 190s =

Fw 190
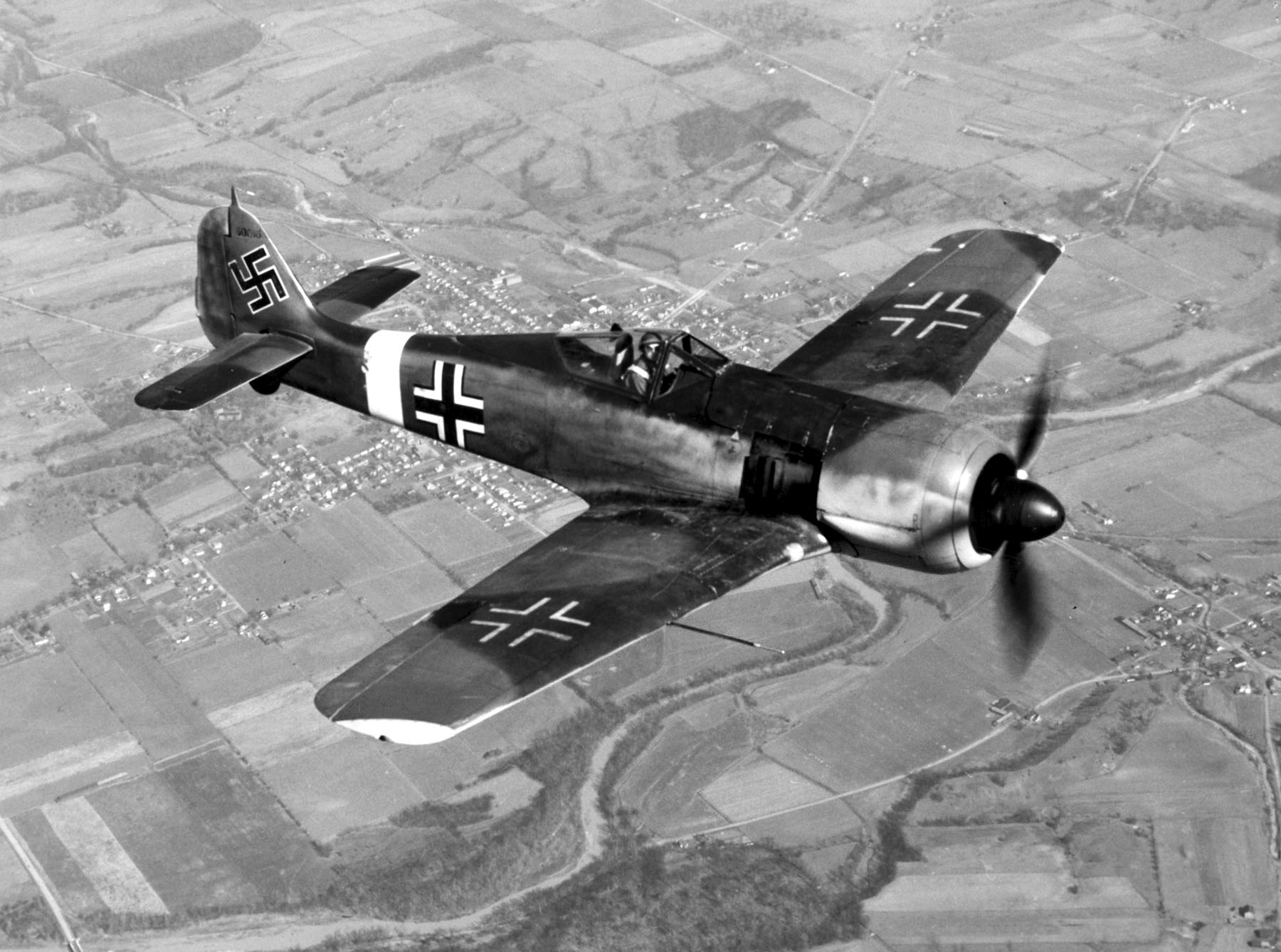
- Captured Fw 190 A in replicated Luftwaffe insignia. As a result the markings are enlarged and placed incorrectly

This is a list of surviving Focke-Wulf Fw 190s. At least 23 Fw 190s exist in museums, collections and in storage worldwide, with 11 displayed in the United States. The National Air and Space Museum stores the only known surviving "long-wing" Ta 152 H, an H-0/R-11 version, at the Paul E. Garber Preservation, Restoration and Storage Facility in Suitland, Maryland.

Six surviving Fw 190s served with JG 5 during their wartime existence, and when these six Fw 190s are added to the twenty surviving examples of the Bf 109s that also served with JG 5 during the war, a total of twenty-seven surviving former JG 5 aircraft — including one surviving Bf 110F "destroyer" heavy fighter that served in JG 5's lone tenth Zerstörerstaffel squadron (10.(Z)/JG 5) — are still in existence in the 21st century, more than from any other former Luftwaffe or other Axis Forces national aviation unit of the World War II era.

== Surviving aircraft ==
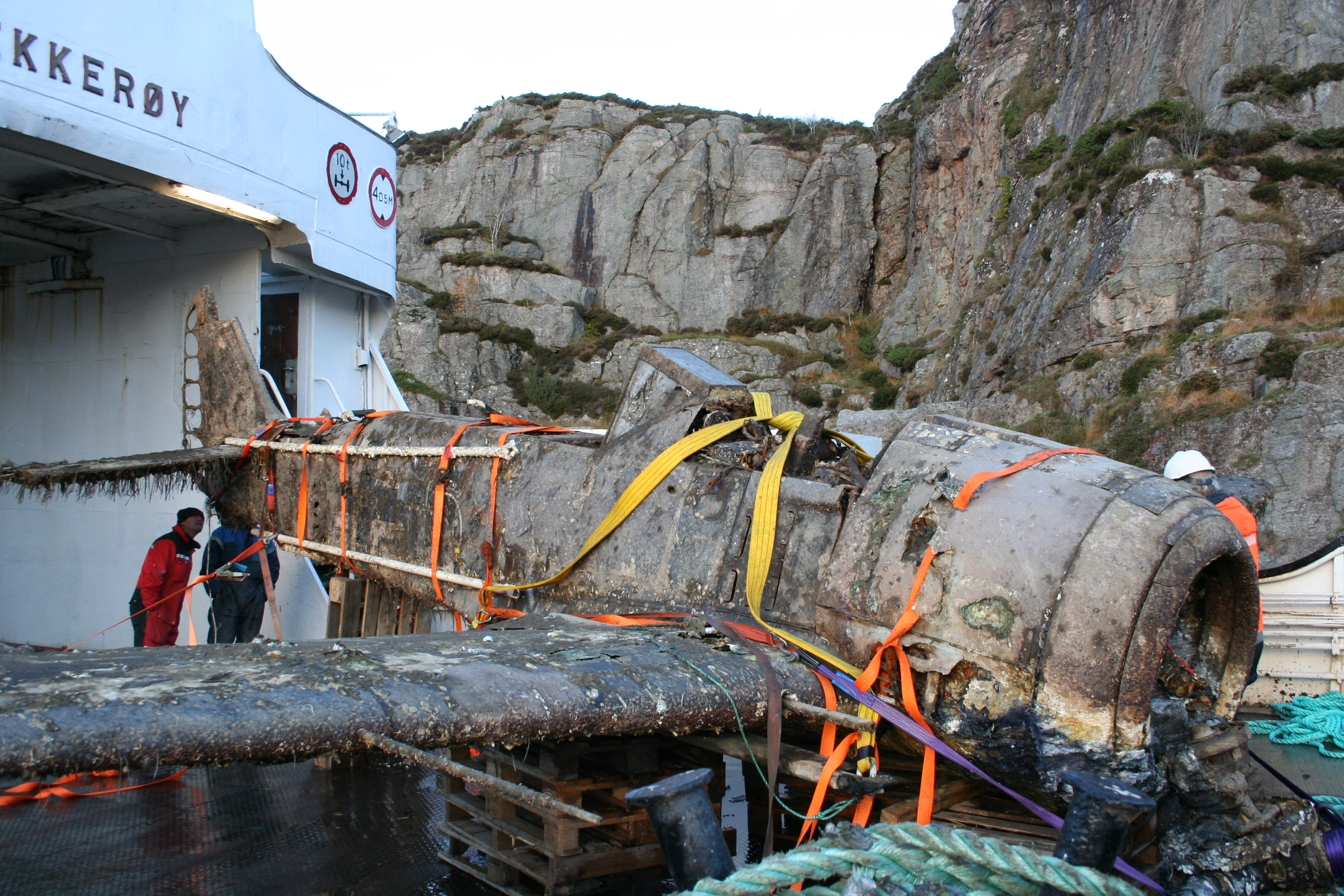
The Fw 190 A-3 wr. 2219, photographed just after being salvaged.

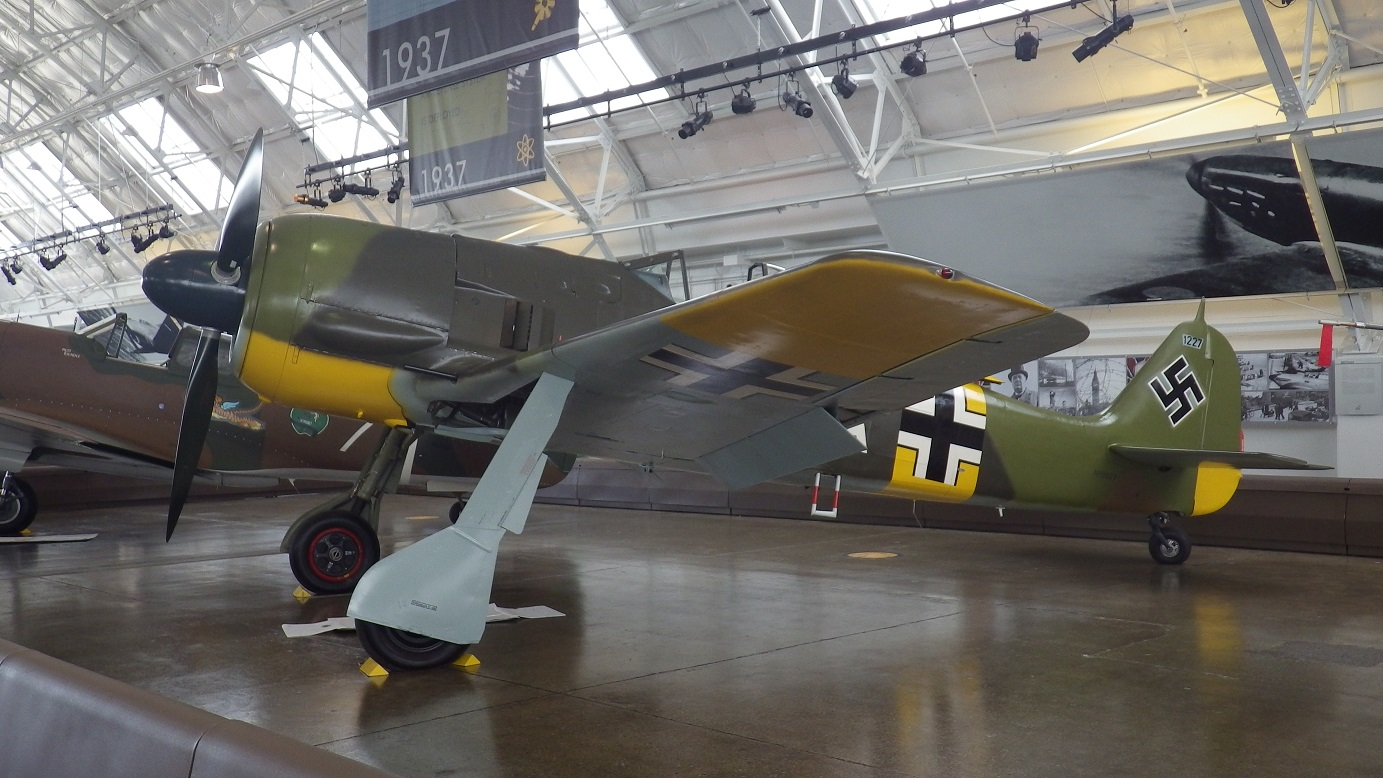
The Flying Heritage & Combat Armor Museum's airworthy Fw 190A-5, WkNr. 151 227, on indoor display between flights.

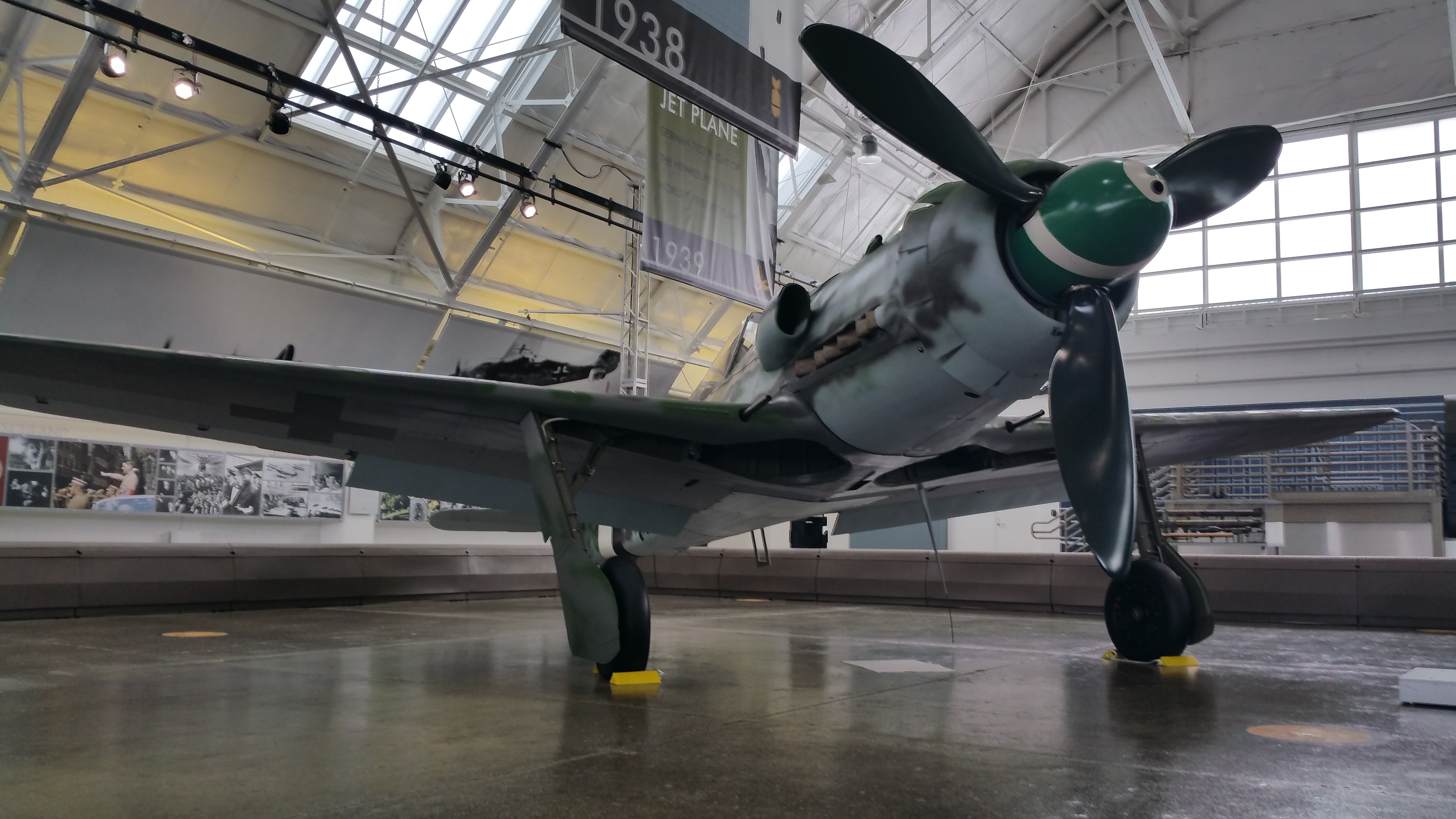
Focke-Wulf Fw 190 D-13.

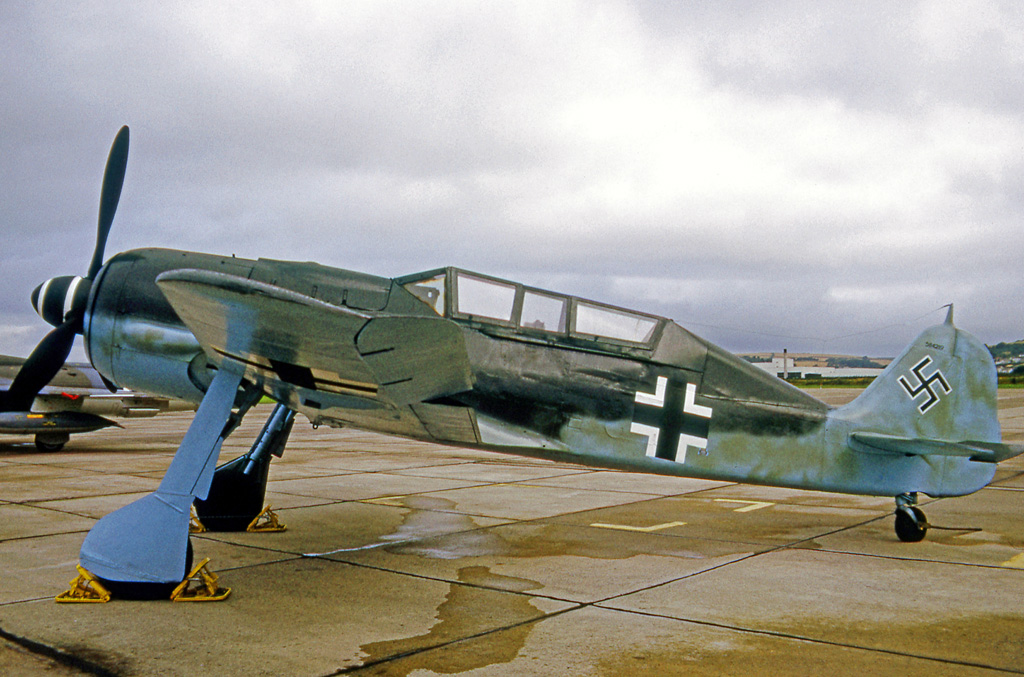
Wk.Nr. 584219 two-seat variant in 1971. Now preserved at the RAF Museum, Hendon

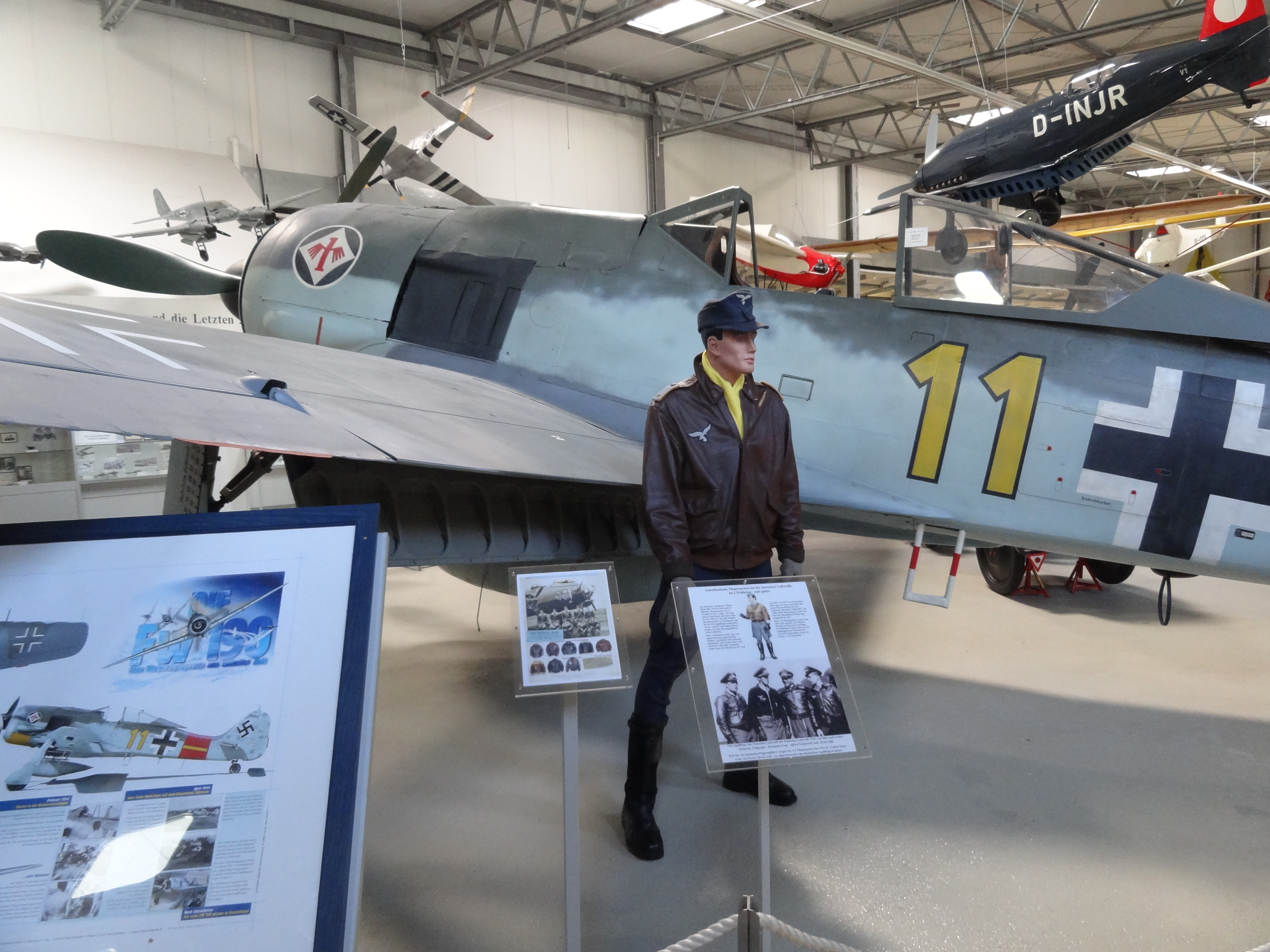
Fw 190 on display at the Aviation Museum Hannover-Laatzen

=== France ===
- 730923 – NC 900 on static display at the Musée de l’air et de l’espace in Paris, Île-de-France.

=== Germany ===
- 210968 – Fw 190 D-9 on static display at the Militärhistorisches Museum Flugplatz Berlin-Gatow in Berlin, Berlin. This airframe was flown by Karl Fröb of 2./JG 26 when it crashed in Lake Schwerin on 17 April 1945.
- 670071 – Fw 190 F-3 on static display in unrestored condition at the Flugplatzmuseum Cottbus in Cottbus, Brandenburg. This airframe is from 1./SchG 1.

=== Norway ===
- 2219 – Fw-190 A-3/U3 on static display at the Norwegian Aviation Museum in Bodø, Nordland.
- 125425 – Fw 190 A-2 on static display in unrestored condition at the Herdla Museum in Herdla in Hordaland. This airframe is from IV./JG 5, recovered from underwater location, it was rebuilt for the Norwegian Air Force Museum. The aircraft was salvaged from the ocean off the island of Sotra, near Bergen, Norway. Its pilot had made an emergency landing in December 1943 and had scrambled to safety and was rescued soon after; his aircraft had sunk to the bottom of the sea. After its retrieval from 60 m deep water, the Fw 190, "Yellow 16," from IV/JG 5 was only missing its canopy and the fabric-covered wing and tail surfaces.

=== Serbia ===
- 930838 – Fw 190 F-8 in storage at the Belgrade Aviation Museum in Surčin, Belgrade.

=== South Africa ===
- 550214 – Fw 190 A-6 on static display at the South African National Museum of Military History in Johannesburg, Gauteng. This airframe was possibly flown by 8/JG 11 as it was fitted with a FuG 217 Neptun radar system.

=== United Kingdom ===
- 584219 – Fw 190 F-8/U1, that is part of the collection of the Royal Air Force Museum London in London. Captured by the RAF in Norway, it had been converted into a two-seat configuration for use as a trainer, possibly for Jagdfliegerschule 103. In October 2023, it was moved to the Militärhistorisches Museum Flugplatz Berlin-Gatow, where it will be on-loan for three years.

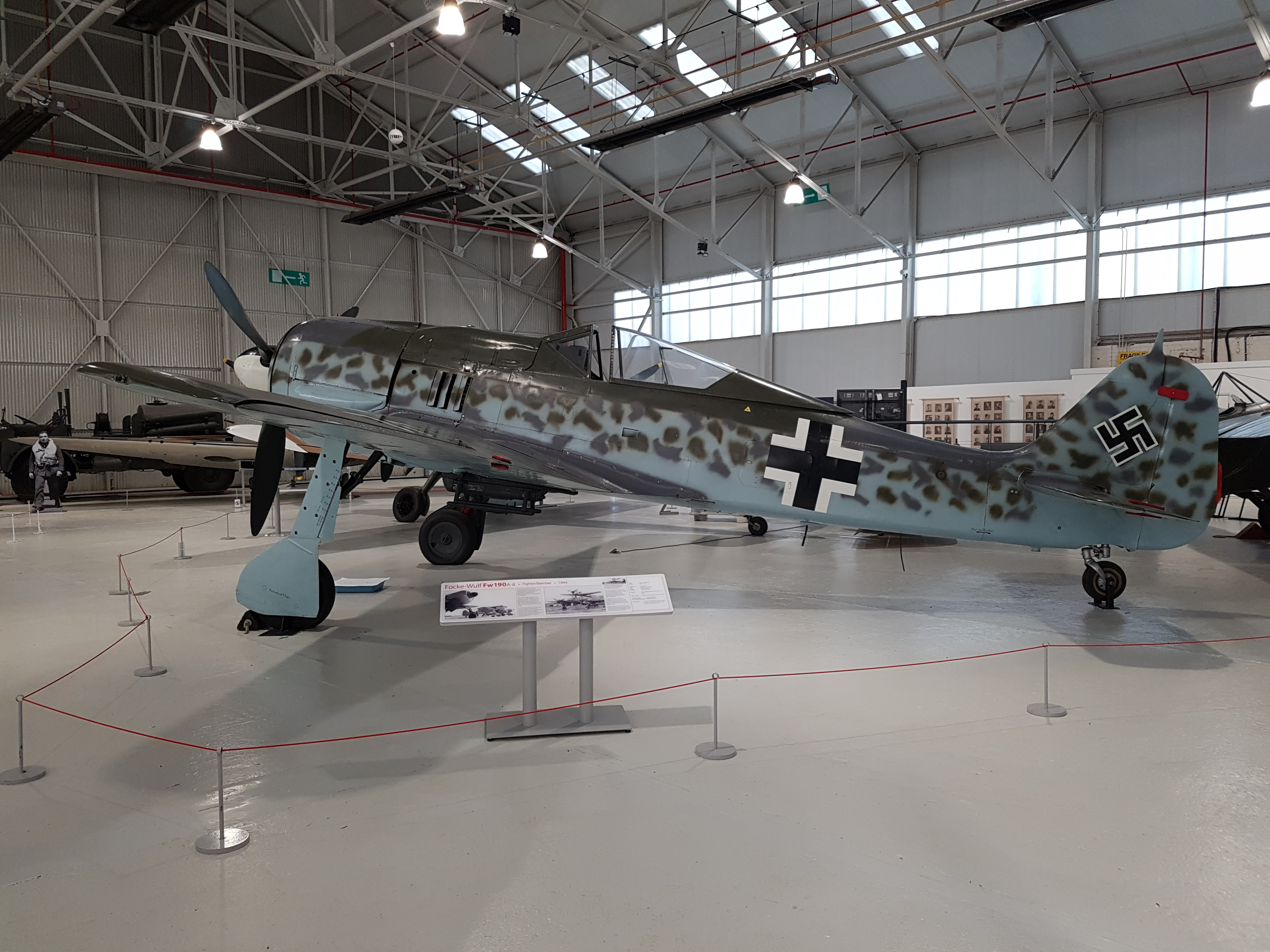
Fw 190A-8 at Cosford. The camouflage and markings have been incorrectly applied.

- 733682 – Fw 190 A-8/R6 on static display at the Royal Air Force Museum Cosford in Cosford, Shropshire. This airframe had originally been part of a Mistel S-3B composite aircraft along with a Junkers Ju 88 bomber-converted flying bomb. Previously on display at the Imperial War Museum since 1986, it was moved to its current location in October 2013, where it went on display after a short period of restoration.

=== United States ===
- 5476 – Fw 190 A-2 under restoration to airworthy by Wade S. Haynes in Anson, Texas. This airframe is from JG 5 and is thought to be one of the oldest Fw 190s still in existence.
- 151227 – Fw 190 A-5 airworthy at the Flying Heritage & Combat Armor Museum in Everett, Washington. This airframe was being flown by Paul Rätz of JG 54 when it crash landed in a forest in Voibakala near Saint Petersburg on 9 July 1943 due to sabotage of the oil lines. It was discovered in the same location in 1988 or 1989 and was recovered in 1990 or 1991. Its first post restoration flight was on 1 or 2 December 2010. It is currently the only airworthy Fw 190 with an original BMW 801 engine.
- 173889 – Fw 190 A-8 under restoration with Mark Timken. This airframe was from 7./JG 1.
- 210096 – Fw 190 D-9 owned by the Collings Foundation in Stow, Massachusetts.
- 550470 – Fw 190 A-6 under restoration to airworthy by Brian O'Farrell in Pembroke Pines, Florida. This airframe, originally built by AGO Flugzeugwerke, was previously owned by Malcolm Laing in Lubbock, Texas. It is a composite using parts from Wk. Nr. 140668. This airframe is from 1./JG 26.
- 601088 – Fw 190 D-9 on static display at the National Museum of the United States Air Force in Dayton, Ohio. This airframe is from IV (Sturm)./JG 3 "Udet" Geschwader, captured by the US intact and labeled FE-120 and used in testing following the war. It is on long term loan from the National Air and Space Museum.
- 732183 – Fw 190 A-8 on static display at the Military Aviation Museum in Virginia Beach, Virginia. This airframe is from 12./JG 5, and was previously located at the Texas Air Museum in Rio Hondo, Texas. Displayed as the a/c flown by Ltn Rudi Linz in 12./JG 5, a German ace with 70 victories. He was shot down over Norway by a British Mustang Mk III during the 'Black Friday' raid on 9 February 1945.
- 836017 – Fw 190 D-13 on static display at the Flying Heritage Collection in Everett, Washington. This airframe is from 1./JG 26 as flown by Major Franz Götz. After capture it was donated to the Georgia Technical University, and then fell into disrepair. Later restored in Germany by William Flugzeuge and returned to the Champlin Fighter Museum in Mesa, Arizona. It was later loaned to the Museum of Flight in Seattle, Washington when the Champlin museum closed its doors, and is now on display in Everett, Washington as a part of Paul Allen's Flying Heritage Collection. The aircraft has been restored close to flyable condition, but it will not be flown because it is the only surviving D-13.
- 931862 – Fw 190 F-8 under restoration to airworthy for the Collings Foundation in Stow, Massachusetts. It was being restored by American Aero Services but is now being worked on by GossHawk Unlimited. This airframe is from 9./JG 5, the "White 1" as flown by Unteroffizier Heinz Orlowski, who examined his former aircraft personally in 2005, during its restoration. Also shot down by P-51s over Norway in the "Black Friday" engagement. Originally under restoration in Kissimmee, Florida, USA by The White 1 Foundation, it was transferred to the Collings Foundation in 2012.
- 931884 – Fw 190 F-8 on static display at the Steven F. Udvar-Hazy Center of the National Air and Space Museum in Chantilly, Virginia. This airframe is from I./SG 2. It was first built as an A-4 with Wk. Nr. 640069, but later rebuilt as an F-8. Captured intact by the US and marked as FE-117.

=== Unknown ===
- 5415 – Fw 190 F-8 thought to be under restoration in New Zealand and owned by the Old Flying Machine Company in the mid-1990s.
- 400616 – Fw 190 D-9 at an unknown location. This airframe was on display at the Hangar 10 facility in Zirchow, Mecklenburg-Vorpommern. It was sold by Platinum Fighter Sales in 2015.

== Modern reproductions ==
=== Flug + Werk reproductions ===
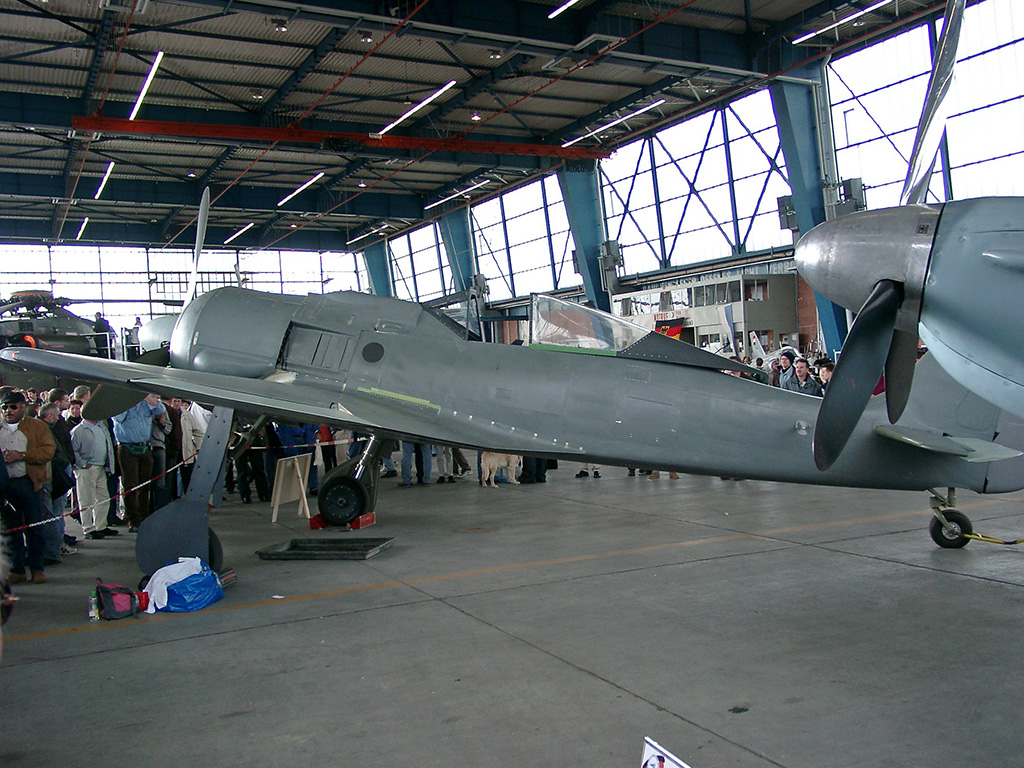
A Fw 190 A-8/N reproduction by Flug Werk.

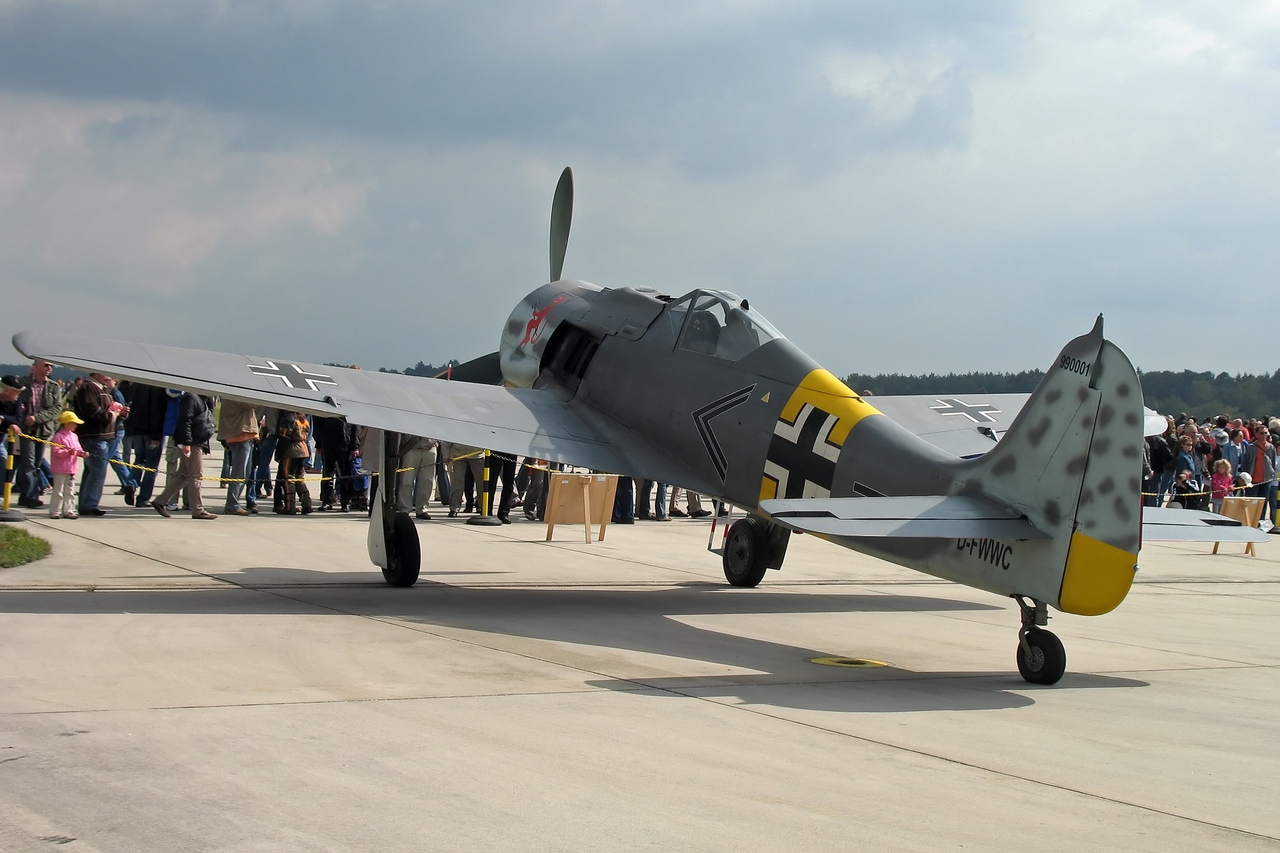
A Fw 190 A-8/N reproduction in the colors and markings as Oberst Erich Rudorffer’s mount of JG 54 when stationed at Immola/Finland.

Starting in 1996 a small German company, Flug + Werk GmbH, began work on new Fw 190 A-8s; a run of 21 kits were produced. These planes are new reproduction builds from the ground up, using many original dies, plans, and other information from the war. The construction was sub-contracted to Aerostar SA of Bacău, Romania; both companies have been involved in a number of warbird replica projects.

Werk numbers continued from where the German production left off, with the new Fw 190 A-8s being labeled "Fw 190 A-8/N" (N for Nachbau: "replica"). Some of these new Fw 190s are known to be fitted with the original tail wheel units from the Second World War; a small cache of tail gear having been discovered. In November 2004, the first flights were completed.

Since the BMW 801 engines are no longer available, a Chinese licensed Soviet-designed engine, the Shvetsov ASh-82FN 14-cylinder twin-row radial engine of similar configuration though slightly smaller displacement (41.2 litres versus 41.8) to the original BMW powerplants, which powered some of the Fw 190s opposition: the La-5 and La-7, were used in the new Fw 190 A-8/N. Some customers specified American Pratt & Whitney R-2800 Double Wasp engines, though these are larger than the ASh-82 with different mounting points requiring some modification.

As part of the run of 21 examples, FlugWerk also produced a limited number of "long nose" Fw 190D examples powered by Allison V-1710s.

List of reproductions
Flug Werk c/n	Variant	Status	Owner	Location	Given Werk Nummer	Registration	Installed engine	Remarks
990000	A-8	Static display	Aviation Museum Hannover-Laatzen	Laatzen, Lower Saxony	170393			
990001	A-8	Airworthy	Chariots of Fire Fighter Collection/Omaka Aviation Heritage Centre	Blenheim, Marlborough	990001	ZK-RFR	ASh-82	Previously registered as D-FWWC. Arrived in New Zealand in April 2011. Damaged in a ground loop on 3 April 2015 and rebuilt to airworthy.
990002	A-8	Airworthy	Erickson Aircraft Collection	Madras, Oregon	550476	N447FW	HS-7	Previously registered as D-FMFW. Previously owned by the Military Aviation Museum.
990003	D-9	Airworthy	Military Aviation Museum	Virginia Beach, Virginia		N623TB	V-1710	
990004	A-8	Airworthy	Raptor Aviation	Wangaratta, Victoria	173056	VH-WLF	ASh-82T	Previously registered to Don Hansen as N4190. First flight on 9 October 2011. Damaged in a nose-over accident on 8 October 2014. Exported to Australia in 2015, and initially hangered in Albury, New South Wales.
990005	A-8	Airworthy	Military Aviation Museum	Virginia Beach, Virginia		N190BR	ASh-82	Previously owned by Bob Russell. Damaged in a ground loop in April 2010.
990006	D-9	Undergoing work	Eric Vormezeele	Brasschaat, Antwerp	210102			
990007	A-8	Static display	Militärhistorisches Museum Flugplatz Berlin-Gatow	Berlin, Berlin	682060		BMW 801	
990008			Fink?					
990009	A-8	Airworthy			980554	D-FWMV		Previously registered to Tom Blair as G-FWAB. Worked on by Meier Motors. Damaged in a gear up landing in July 2014.
990010	A-8	Airworthy	Planes of Fame Air Museum	Chino, California	980574	N190RF	R-2800-54	
990011	F-8	Airworthy	Tri-State Warbird Museum	Batavia, Ohio	583661	N190AF	R-2800-57M2	Previously owned by Dr. Thomas Summer.
990012	A-8	Storage	TAM Museum	São Carlos, São Paulo				
990013	A-8	Airworthy	Hangar 10/Air Fighter Academy GmbH	Usedom, Germany	170389	D-FWAA	ASh-82T	Previously registered to Christophe Jacquard as F-AZZJ. Damaged in an emergency ditching in Hyères, Provence-Alpes-Côte d'Azur on 12 June 2010. Restored to airworthy by MeierMotors.
990014								
990015	D-9							
990016								
990017	A-8	Static display	UMMC Museum Complex	Verkhnyaya Pyshma, Sverdlovsk, Russia		D-FWJS	ASh-82	
990018								
990019	A-5	Airworthy	Ali İsmet Öztürk	Eskişehir, Turkey	1134	N190DK	ASh-82	Damaged in accident on 30 March 2012. Repaired by GossHawk Unlimited. Purchased by Ali İsmet Öztürk 2025, to be moved to M.S.Ö. Air & Space Museum after restoration. Restored to airworthy in July 2026.
990020	A-8	Airworthy	Västerås Flygmuseum	Västerås, Västmanland	739137	SE-FWA	ASh-82T	Previously registered as D-FWSE.
