= Ali Öztürk =

Ali Öztürk may refer to:

- Ali Öztürk (footballer, born 1986), Turkish footballer
- Ali Öztürk (footballer, born 1987), Turkish footballer
- Ali Öztürk (table tennis) (born 1993), Turkish Paralympian table tennis player
