= Sener =

Sener may refer to:

- SENER, Construction & engineering company of Spain
- Şener, Turkish name
