= Living Out Islam =

2013 non-fiction book by Scott Siraj al-Haqq Kugle

- Author: Scott Siraj al-Haqq Kugle
- Language: English
- Publisher: NYU Press
- Publication date: 2013
- Pages: 280
- ISBN: 978-0-814-70796-8
- OCLC: 867741140

Living Out Islam: Voices of Gay, Lesbian, and Transgender Muslims is a non-fiction book by Scott Alan Kugle. It was published in 2013 by NYU Press, and it describes the lives of fifteen queer Muslims.

== See also ==
- Homosexuality in Islam
