= Tri-State Warbird Museum =

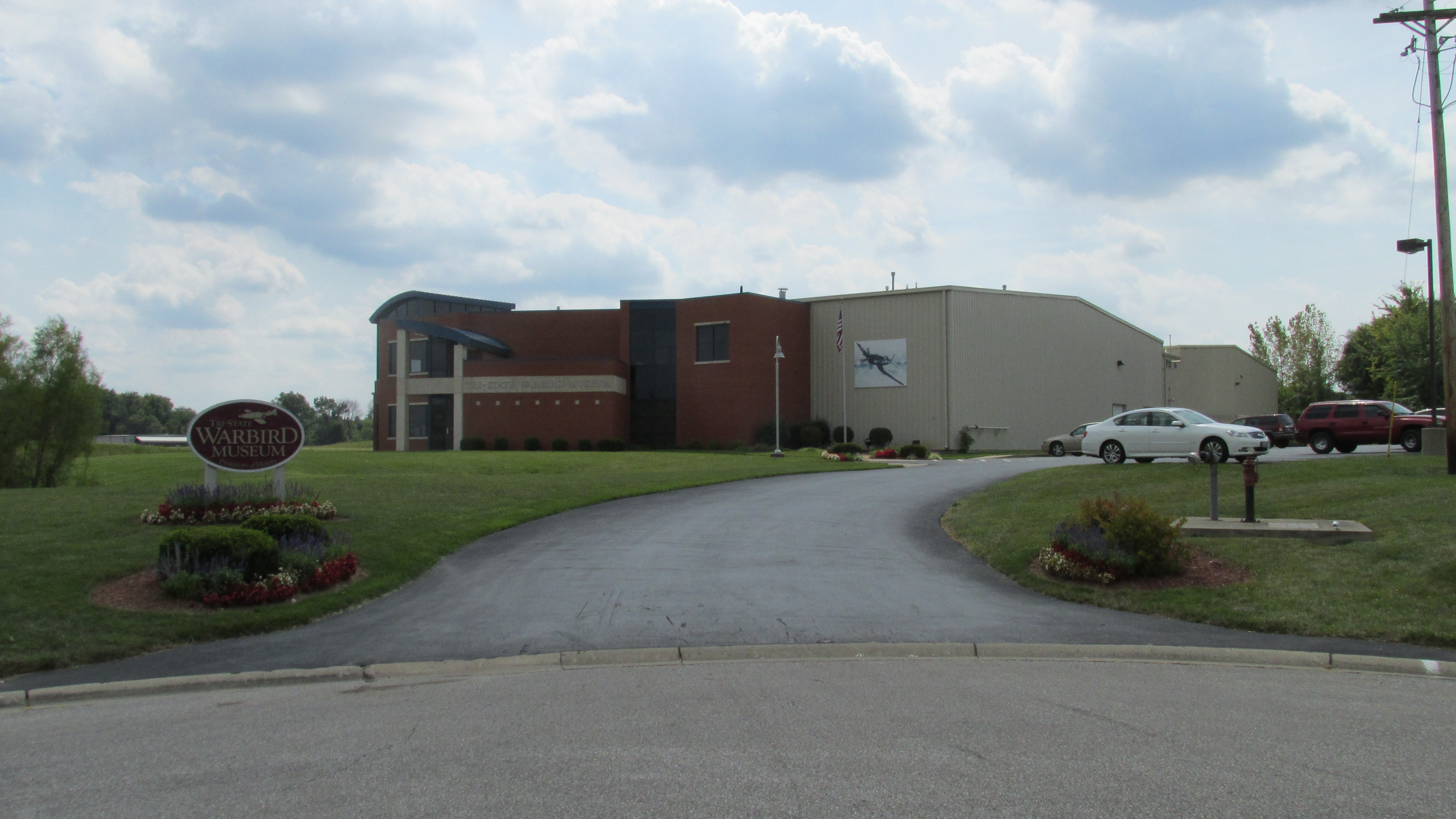
- The exterior of the museum

- Location in Ohio
- Established: 2003
- Location: Batavia, Ohio, United States
- Coordinates: 39.077577°N 84.212993°W
- Type: Military aviation museum
- Collection size: 12 aircraft
- Founder: David O'Maley Sr.
- President: David O'Maley Jr.
- Website: tri-statewarbirdmuseum.org

The Tri-State Warbird Museum is a private, not-for-profit aviation museum located in Batavia, Ohio, in Clermont County next to the Clermont County Airport.

== Overview ==
The focus of the museum is on World War II, therefore, all aircraft at the museum are from this time period. The goal of the museum is to preserve and operate these aircraft, as a result, all either are flyable or will be made flyable. The museum publishes a newsletter called "Taking Flight" approximately 1 or 2 times per year. Every June, a fundraising gala is held by the museum. A World War II period barracks exhibit is also on display at the museum.

== History ==
The museum was formed in 2003 by David O'Maley Sr. and opened to the public on 21 May 2005. O'Maley is a former CEO of Ohio National Life Insurance Company.

In 2006, a TBM Avenger aircraft operated by the museum taxied into a homebuilt plane at the 2006 Oshkosh fly in. A passenger in the homebuilt was killed. The NTSB investigation faulted the Avenger pilot.

In 2011, due to a large donation, a second hangar was built at the museum to provide additional space for aircraft.

The museum's P-40 was involved in an accident on 8 December 2011, shortly after being restored to flight status. The aircraft experienced an engine failure and had to be glided back to the airport from an altitude of 6,500 feet. Upon landing it overran the runway, went through a fence and came to rest on a nearby road.

Three World War II veterans received the French Legion of Honour at an event held at the museum on 12 February 2013.

The museum's B-25 performed part of the flyover for the final toast of the Doolittle Raiders at the National Museum of the United States Air Force on 9 November 2013.

The museum's P-40 won the World War II Grand Champion award at the EAA AirVenture Oshkosh airshow in 2016.

The museum's B-25 flew to Sardinia, Italy to take part in the filming of Catch-22 in 2018.

== Collection ==
=== Airworthy ===
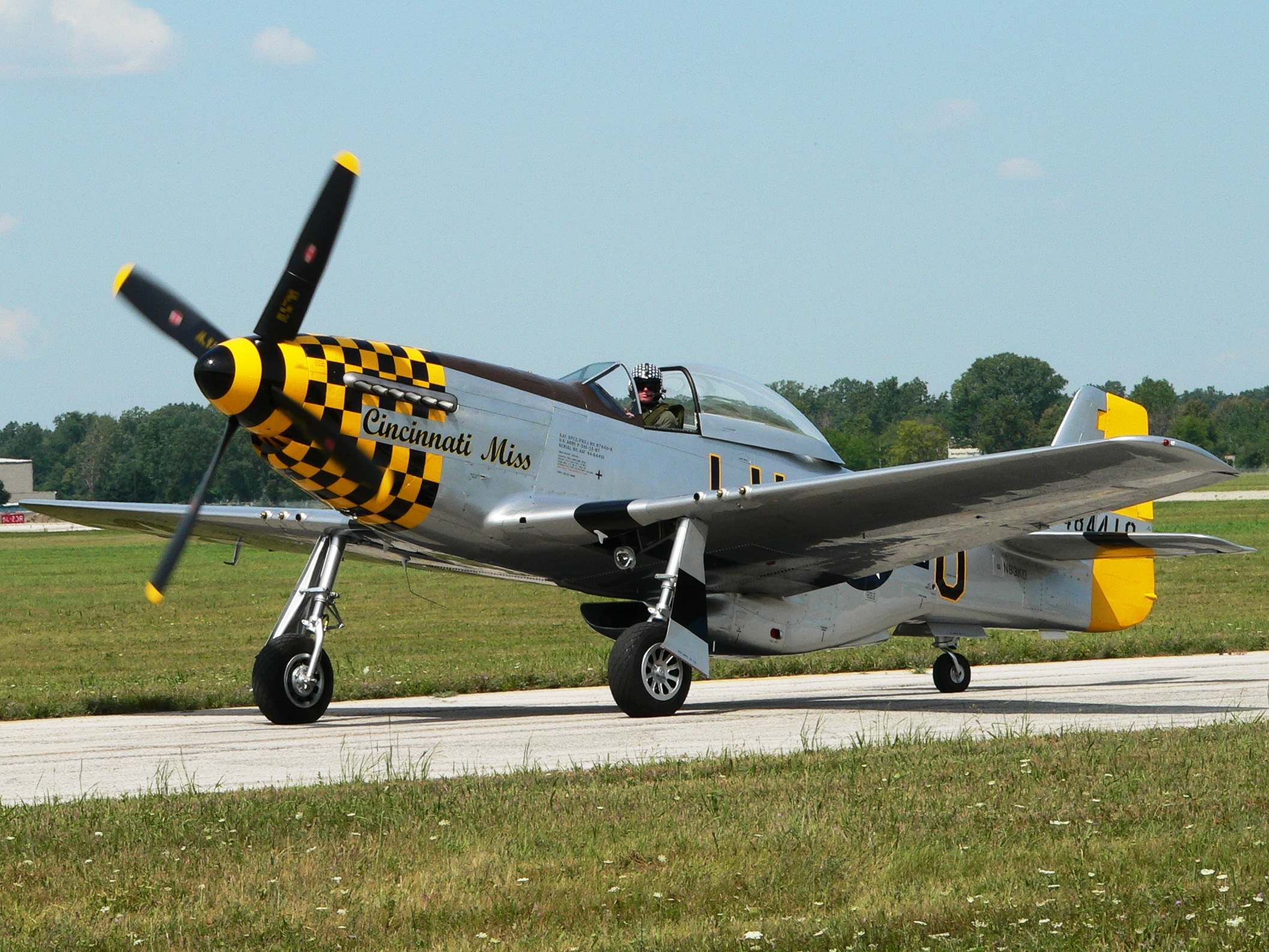
Cincinnati Miss at Willow Run Airport in August 2005.

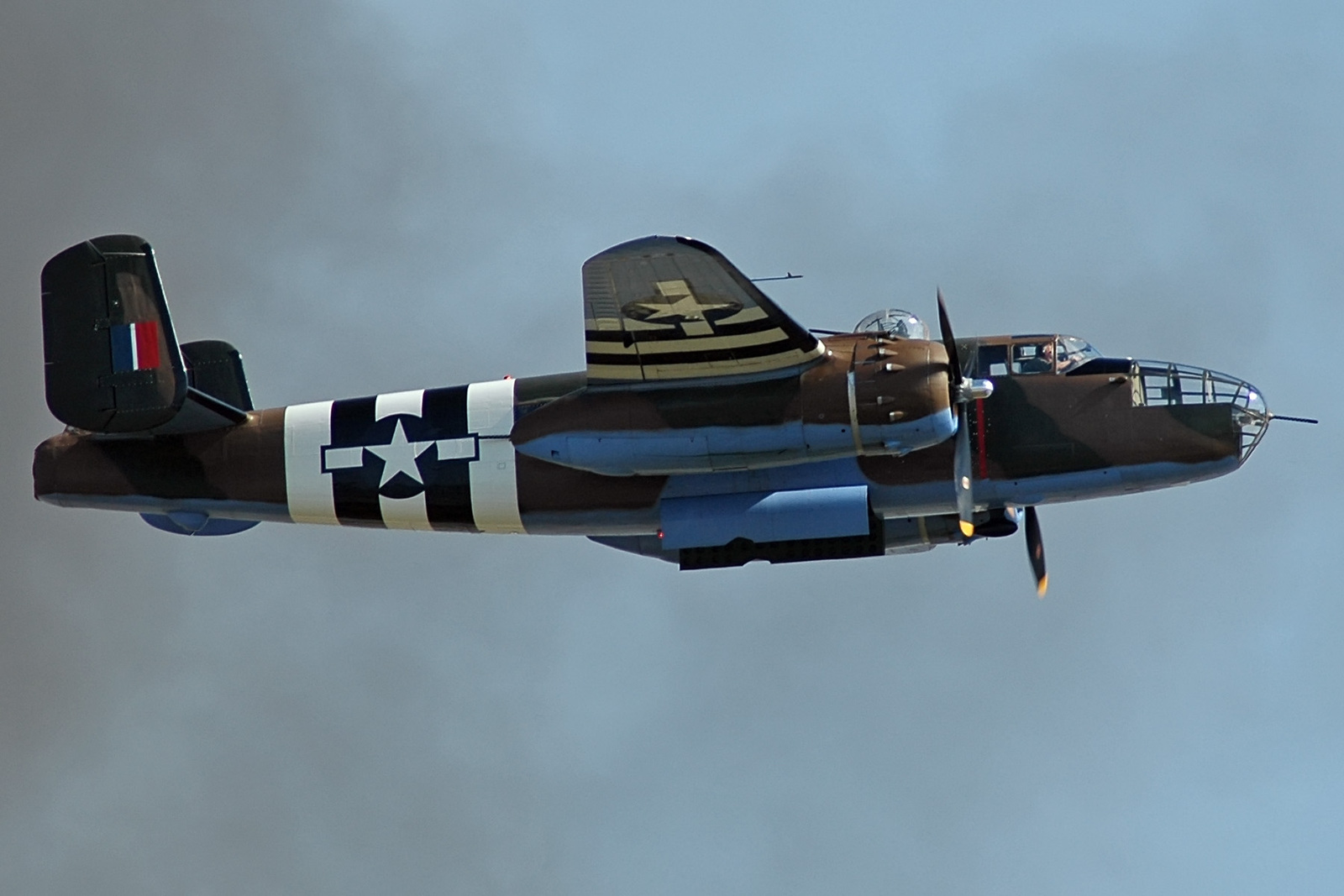
The museum's TB-25N.

- Beechcraft TC-45H Expeditor 51-11529
- Boeing-Stearman N2S-3 75-7899
- Curtiss P-40M Kittyhawk 43-5813
- Focke-Wulf Fw 190 F-8 583-661 – Replica
- Grumman HU-16C Albatross 51-017
- North American AT-6D Texan 42-84779
- North American TB-25N Mitchell 45-8898
- North American P-51D Mustang 44-84410
- Piper J3C Cub 22743
- Piper L-4H Grasshopper 43-29332

=== Under Restoration ===
- Goodyear FG-1D Corsair 92132

=== Stored ===
- Eastern TBM-3E Avenger 53420

=== Other Vehicles ===
- Link AN-T-18 Trainer 4936
- CJ-2A Jeep 204386

== See also ==
- List of aerospace museums
- List of museums in Ohio
