= Şener =

Şener is a Turkish name and may refer to:

== Given name ==
- Şener Özbayraklı, Turkish footballer
- Şener Şen, Turkish actor

== Surname ==
- Abdüllatif Şener, Turkish politician
- Aydan Şener, Turkish film and television actress
- Erman Şener, Turkish film critic, screenwriter, author, columnist, TV host and producer
- Kerem Şener (born 2003), Turkish artistic gymniast
- Semin Öztürk Şener (born 1991), Turkish female aerobatics pilot
- Yakup Şener (born 1990), Turkish amateur boxer
