= Abdulla Galadari =

Emirati Quranic studies scholar

Abdulla Galadari is an Emirati scholar of Quranic studies. He is an associate professor at Khalifa University of Science and Technology in Abu Dhabi, United Arab Emirates.

His work focuses on Qur'anic hermeneutics and the engagement of the Quran with Near Eastern traditions in Late Antiquity, employing a multidisciplinary approach that integrates cognitive science of religion and philology.

== Biography ==
Abdulla Galadari completed two B.Sc. degrees from the University of Colorado, followed by an M.Eng. and an M.Sc. from the same institution. He received a Ph.D. in civil engineering at the University of Colorado and later earned a Ph.D. in Arabic and Islamic studies from the University of Aberdeen.

Galadari serves as the convener of the Qur'an and Islamic Tradition in Comparative Perspective section for the Society of Biblical Literature.

Illuminating scriptural connections, a Qur’anic commentary on the Torah

== Works ==
- Qur'anic Hermeneutics: Between Science, History, and the Bible (2018) (Translated into Turkish by A.Kadir Harmancı)
- Metaphors of Death and Resurrection in the Qur’an: An Intertextual Approach with Biblical and Rabbinic Literature (2021) (The book was named a finalist for the 2022 Award for Excellence in the Study of Religion, Textual Studies, by the American Academy of Religion, "in recognition of...exceptional scholarship," as noted by the juries.)
- Spiritual Meanings of the Ḥajj Rituals: A Philological Approach (2021)

== See also ==
- Mohsen Goudarzi
- Walid Saleh
