= Atacan Öztürk =

Turkish footballer

Personal information
- Date of birth: 18 January 1982 (age 44)
- Place of birth: Antalya, Turkey
- Height: 1.85 m (6 ft 1 in)
- Position: Goalkeeper

Team information
- Current team: Erzurumspor (GK coach)

Youth career
- 1995–1998: Antalya Özel İdarespor
- 1999–2000: Antalyaspor

Senior career*
| Years | Team | Apps | (Gls) |
| 2000–2003 | Antalyaspor | 3 | (0) |
| 2003–2007 | Elazığspor | 28 | (0) |
| 2007–2012 | Boluspor | 104 | (0) |
| 2012–2013 | Şanlıurfaspor | 32 | (0) |
| 2013–2014 | Boluspor | 35 | (0) |
| 2014–2015 | Alanyaspor | 0 | (0) |
| 2015–2016 | Sarıyer | 17 | (0) |
| 2016 | Göztepe | 5 | (0) |
| 2016–2017 | Tokatspor | 31 | (0) |
| 2017–2018 | Silivrispor | 2 | (0) |

Managerial career
- 2019: BB Erzurumspor (GK coach)
- 2019–2020: Diyarbakırspor (GK coach)
- 2021–2022: Nazilli Belediyespor (GK coach)
- 2022–: Erzurumspor (GK coach)
- * Club domestic league appearances and goals

Atacan Öztürk (born 18 January 1982) is a Turkish professional football coach and a former player. He is the goalkeeping coach for Erzurumspor.

== Career ==
His debut in Turkcell Super League May 26, 2001 match against İstanbulspor. But never pick Antalya's first choice goalkeeper for two years. After waiting two years, he moved another Super League team Elazığspor in 2003. He served as third goalie behind Miroslav König and Orkun Uşak. Same year Elazığspor was relegated and some players left their clubs including goalkeeper Miroslav König. When Miroslav König left the team Oğuzhan Bahadır was signed as the new first-choice goalkeeper. Atacan faced stiff competition against Oğuzhan. He made only 5 appearances that season. At the end of 2005-2006 season, Elazığspor announced that they would not prolong the contract with Oğuzhan and therefore Atacan was to become the team's first-choice goalkeeper. In August 2007 Atacan signed a contract with Boluspor. Atacan Öztürk has represented Turkey 43 times at various age levels including Under-16s, Under-17s, Under-18s, Under-19s and Under-21s.
