= Erkan Öztürk =

German-Turkish footballer

Personal information
- Date of birth: 17 May 1983 (age 43)
- Place of birth: Leverkusen, West Germany
- Height: 1.79 m (5 ft 10 in)
- Position: Striker

Team information
- Current team: Inter Monheim (player coach)

Senior career*
Years	Team	Apps	(Gls)
2001–2004	Bayer Leverkusen II	22	(0)
2004–2005	Samsunspor	16	(0)
2005–2007	Diyarbakırspor	7	(0)
2006	→ Gaziantep B.B. (loan)	3	(0)
2007	Eyüpspor	10	(1)
2008	İstanbulspor	7	(0)
2008–2010	Eyüpspor		
2010–2011	Çorumspor	22	(0)
2011–2012	Bozüyükspor	3	(0)
2012–2013	Gölcükspor	24	(2)
2013–2021	FC Leverkusen		
2021–	Inter Monheim		

Managerial career
- 2016–2018: FC Leverkusen (player-coach)
- 2020–2021: FC Leverkusen (player-coach)
- 2021–: FC Leverkusen (head scout)
- 2021–: Inter Monheim (player-coach)
- * Club domestic league appearances and goals as of September 15, 2008

Erkan Öztürk (born 17 May 1983) is a German-Turkish professional footballer. He is the player-coach (plays as a striker) for amateur German side Inter Monheim.

== Club career ==
Öztürk began his career in Germany playing for Bayer Leverkusen II in the Regionalliga Nord. In August 2004, he moved to Turkey to play for Samsunspor in the Süper Lig.
