= Fadıl Öztürk =

Turkish writer and poet (1955–2025)

Fadıl Öztürk (1955, Tunceli – 1 May 2025, İzmir) was a Kurdish writer and poet. He wrote literary and political work. He was jailed for ten years. On 8 December 2004, he took part in the campaign 'Demands of Kurds in Turkey' that had been published as a half page advert on Herald Tribune. In December 2005, he took part with 135 artists in the campaign supporting the Kurdish Television Channel Roj TV.

== Works ==
=== Poem books ===
- Hep kuzeydi gözlerin
- Ateşe konuş Küle Ağa
- Esmer bir acı
- Suyu uyandırım sesim olsun
