= Homosexuality in Islam (book) =

2010 nonfiction book by Scott Siraj Al-Haqq Kugle

Homosexuality in Islam: Critical Reflection on Gay, Lesbian and Transgender Muslims
- Author: Scott Siraj al-Haqq Kugle
- Publisher: Oneworld Publications
- Publication date: 1 February 2010
- Pages: 335
- ISBN: 9781851687015

Homosexuality in Islam: Critical Reflection on Gay, Lesbian, and Transgender Muslims is a book by Scott Siraj al-Haqq Kugle. It was published in 2010 by Oneworld Publications.

== See also ==
- Living Out Islam
