= Västerås Flygmuseum =

Swedish aviation museum

Coordinates: 59.5942°N 16.6261°E

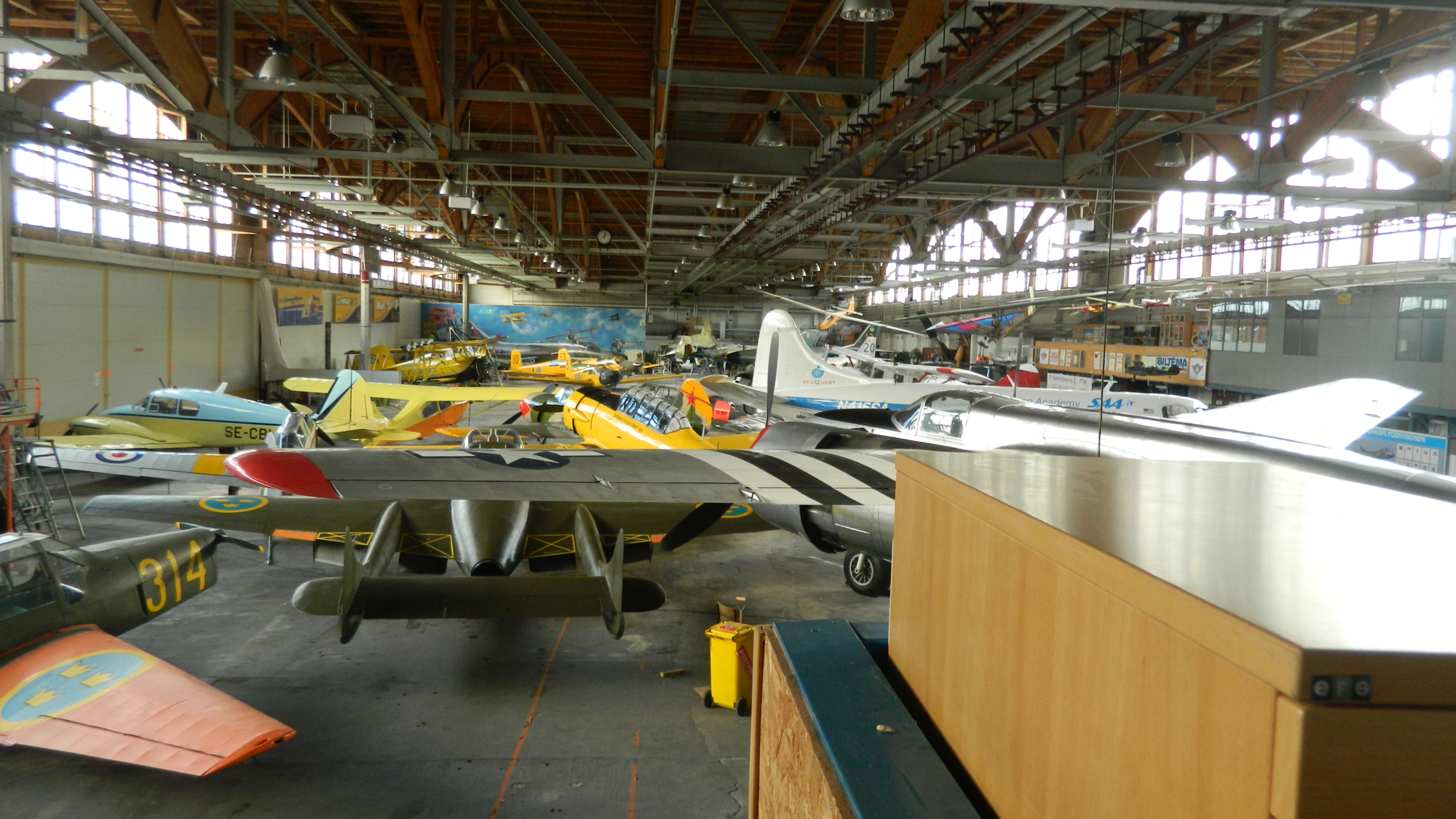
Aircraft parked in the hangar of Västerås Flygmuseum

Västerås Flygmuseum ("Västerås Aviation Museum") is a museum dedicated to flight and aviation history. It is located in Västerås, in an old hangar at Västerås Airport (IATA: VST, ICAO: ESOW) in Sweden, located 100 km west of the capital city, but inside Västerås city limits. It was created in the CVV Hangar at the former Swedish Air Force base "F1-Hässlö" in 1997.

The museum hosts a large number of airplanes, of which 40 are used for flight. The museum is open to the public at least every Sunday. and at other times after contact with the museum

== Simulators ==
The museum also hosts a simple non aircraft specific Link Trainer flight simulator and four advanced aircraft simulators which all have been used in pilot training. The following simulators are available:

- Saab 35 Draken, a retired military fighter used by the Swedish Air Force from the late 1950s until the mid-1990s (manufactured 1955–74)
- a twin-piston-engine Convair 440 Metropolitan
- a three jet engine, 300 passenger McDonnell Douglas DC-10
- Airbus A320, a modern fly by wire twin jet.
