= Recep Öztürk =

Turkish footballer

Personal information
- Date of birth: 20 June 1977 (age 49)
- Place of birth: Tekirdağ, Turkey
- Height: 1.94 m (6 ft 4 in)
- Position: Goalkeeper

Senior career*
Years	Team	Apps	(Gls)
1995–1996	Tekirdağspor	6	(0)
1996–1998	Gençlerbirliği	0	(0)
1998–2002	Konyaspor	37	(0)
2002–2003	Ankaragücü	0	(0)
2002–2003	→ Sakaryaspor (loan)	7	(0)
2003–2006	Sakaryaspor	78	(0)
2006–2009	Gençlerbirliği	32	(0)
2009–2010	Konyaspor	25	(0)
2010–2013	Karşıyaka	14	(0)
2013	Giresunspor	15	(0)
2013–2014	Adana Demirspor	10	(0)
2015	Balçova Yaşamspor	12	(0)
- * Club domestic league appearances and goals

Recep Öztürk (born 20 June 1977 in Tekirdağ, Turkey) is a Turkish footballer who played as a goalkeeper.
