= Erdal Öztürk =

German footballer (born 1996)

Personal information
- Date of birth: 7 February 1996 (age 30)
- Place of birth: Berlin, Germany
- Height: 1.72 m (5 ft 8 in)
- Position: Midfielder

Team information
- Current team: Sarıyer

Youth career
- 2011–2015: 1899 Hoffenheim

Senior career*
Years	Team	Apps	(Gls)
2015–2016	1899 Hoffenheim II	10	(0)
2016–2017	Bayern Munich II	54	(2)
2017–2019	Kayserispor	2	(0)
2018–2019	→ Adana Demirspor (loan)	25	(1)
2019–2020	Adana Demirspor	8	(1)
2020	→ Fatih Karagümrük (loan)	9	(1)
2020–2021	Ankara Keçiörengücü	4	(0)
2021	→ Balıkesirspor (loan)	1	(0)
2021–2023	Ankaraspor	68	(15)
2023–	Gençlerbirliği	9	(0)
2024–	→ Sarıyer (loan)	0	(0)

International career^{‡}
2010–2011	Germany U15	4	(0)
2011	Germany U16	2	(0)
2012	Turkey U16	4	(0)
2012–2013	Turkey U17	9	(1)
2015	Germany U19	3	(0)
2015	Germany U20	2	(0)
- * Club domestic league appearances and goals as of 4 February 2024 ‡ National team caps and goals as of 18:03, 26 May 2022 (UTC)

Erdal Öztürk (born 7 February 1996) is a German professional footballer who plays as a midfielder for TFF Second League club Sarıyer on loan from Gençlerbirliği. Born in Germany and of Turkish descent, Öztürk has represented both countries at a youth international level.

== Professional career ==
Öztürk joined Kayserispor from FC Bayern Munich II on 13 June 2017. Öztürk made his professional debut for Kayserispor in a 3-1 Turkish Cup win over Antalyaspor on 27 December 2017.

Before season 2018–2019, he was joined Adana Demirspor with 2-year loan deal. He went on a short loan to Fatih Karagümrük, before transferring to Ankara Keçiörengücü on 15 September 2020. On 26 July 2021, he transferred to Ankaraspor.

== International career ==
Öztürk was born in Germany and is of Turkish descent. He first was a youth international for Germany, having represented the Germany U15s and Germany U16s, before switching to represent the Turkey U16s and Turkey U17. He then switched back, representing the Germany U19s and finally the Germany U20s.
