= Abdullah Saeed (professor) =

Australian scholar of Islamic studies (born 1960)

Abdullah Saeed FAHA is an Australian academic and scholar of Islamic studies who is currently the Sultan of Oman Professor of Arab and Islamic Studies at the University of Melbourne. He is particularly known for his progressive views on religious freedom in Islam and has been translated into several languages.

== Biography ==
Abdullah Saeed was born in the Maldives. He graduated from the Islamic University of Medina in 1986 with a Bachelor of Arts in Arabic and Islamic Studies. He holds an MA in Applied Linguistics as well as a PhD in Islamic Studies from the University of Melbourne, earned in 1992 and 1994, respectively.

Saeed was elected a Fellow of the Australian Academy of the Humanities in 2010.

== Publications ==
Books authored

- Reading the Qur'an in the Twenty-First Century: A Contextualist Approach, Routledge, 2013 | 208 pages | ISBN 978-0415677509
- The Qur'an: An Introduction: Routledge, 2008 | 288 pages | ISBN 978-0415421256
- Islamic Thought: An Introduction: Routledge, 2006 | 224 pages | ISBN 978-0415364096
- Interpreting the Qur'an: Towards a Contemporary Approach: Routledge, 2005 | 208 pages | ISBN 978-0415365383
- Freedom of Religion, Apostasy and Islam [with Hassan Saeed]: Ashgate Pub Ltd, 2004 | 227 pages | ISBN 978-0754630838
- Islam in Australia: Allen & Unwin, 2003 | 240 pages | ISBN 978-1865088648
- Essential Dictionary of Islamic Thought [with Muhammad Kamal and Christina Mayer]: Seaview Press, 2001 | 222 pages | ISBN 978-1740081573
- Islamic Banking and Interest: A Study of the Prohibition of Riba in Islam and Its Contemporary Interpretation: Brill Academic Publishers, 1996 | 169 pages | ISBN 978-9004105652

Monographs

- Islam and Belief: At Home with Religious Freedom: The Zephyr Institute, 2014 | 24 pages | ISBN 978-0-9851087-3-1
- Muslim Australians: Their Beliefs, Practices and Institutions: Commonwealth of Australia, 2004 | 81 pages | ISBN 0-9756064-1-7

Articles and book chapters

- "Pre-modern Islamic Legal Restrictions on Freedom of Religion, with Particular Reference to Apostasy and its Punishment" in Islamic Law and International Human Rights Law: Searching for Common Ground?: Oxford University Press, 2012 | pages 226-246 | ISBN 978-0199641444
- "The Self-Perception and the Originality of the Qur'an: Qur'an 2:23-24, 10:15; 69:38-47" in Communicating the Word: Revelation, Translation, and Interpretation in Christianity and Islam: Georgetown University Press, 2011 | pages 98–104 | ASIN B006LLCPCS
- "Rethinking Classical Muslim Law of Apostasy and the Death Penalty" in Silenced: How Apostasy and Blasphemy Codes are Choking Freedom Worldwide: Oxford University Press, 2011 |pages 223-238 | ISBN 978-0199812288
- "Muslim Debates on Human Rights and Freedom of Religion" in Human Rights in Asia: Edward Elgar Publishing, 2011 | pages 25–37 | ISBN 978-1848446809
- "Muslims in the West and Their Attitudes to Full Participation in Western Societies" in Secularism, Religion and Multicultural Citizenship: Cambridge University Press, 2008 | pages 200-215 | ISBN 978-0521695411
- "Reading the Quran" in A Companion to the Muslim World: I.B. Tauris, 2009 | pages 55–86 | ISBN 978-1848851931
- "Muslims under Non-Muslim Rule: Evolution of a Discourse" in Islamic Legitimacy in a Plural Asia: Routledge, 2008 | pages 14–27 | ISBN 978-0415544870
- "Islamic Religious Education and the Debate on its Reform Post-September 11" in Islam and the West: Reflections from Australia: UNSW Press, 2005 | pages 63–76 | ISBN 978-0868406794
- "The Official Ulema and the Religious Legitimacy of the Modern State" in Islam and Political Legitimacy: Routledge, 2003 | pages 14–28 | ISBN 978-0415314282
- "Jihad and Violence: Changing the Understanding of Jihad among Muslims" in Terrorism and Justice: Moral Argument in a Threatened World: Melbourne University Press, 2002 | pages 72–86 | ISBN 978-0522850499
- "Rethinking Citizenship Rights of Non-Muslims in an Islamic State: Rashid al-Ghannushi's Contribution to the Evolving Debate" in Journal of Islam and Christian-Muslim Relations: vol. 10 no. 3, 1999 | pages 307-323 |
- " A Fresh Look at Freedom of Belief in Islam" in Difference and Tolerance: Human Rights Issues in Southeast Asia: Deakin University Press, 1994 ISBN 978-0949823410
