= Mehmet Gürkan Öztürk =

Turkish footballer

Personal information
- Date of birth: 26 March 1989 (age 37)
- Place of birth: Sinop, Turkey
- Height: 1.80 m (5 ft 11 in)
- Position: Striker

Team information
- Current team: 52 Orduspor
- Number: 19

Youth career
- 2002–2003: Ayancıkspor
- 2003–2005: Altınova
- 2005–2007: İstanbulspor

Senior career*
Years	Team	Apps	(Gls)
2007–2011	İstanbulspor	77	(15)
2008	→ Küçükçekmecespor (loan)	2	(0)
2010	→ Gümüşhanespor (loan)	15	(8)
2011–2012	Darıca Gençlerbirliği	28	(7)
2012–2014	Aydınspor 1923	48	(18)
2014	Çaykur Rizespor	1	(0)
2014–2015	Yeni Malatyaspor	6	(0)
2015	Kartalspor	10	(1)
2015–2016	Aydınspor 1923	32	(5)
2016–2017	Kocaeli Birlik Spor	33	(4)
2017–2018	Niğde Belediyespor	43	(9)
2019	Bandırmaspor	10	(0)
2019–2020	Zonguldak Kömürspor	28	(14)
2020–2021	Uşakspor	33	(16)
2021–2022	Çorum	16	(4)
2022	Ankaraspor	14	(1)
2022–2023	Amed	34	(10)
2023–	52 Orduspor	2	(0)

International career
2007	Turkey U19	4	(0)
- * Club domestic league appearances and goals as of 23 September 2023

Mehmet Gürkan Öztürk (born 26 March 1989) is a Turkish professional footballer who plays for TFF Third League club 52 Orduspor.
