= Emre Öztürk (footballer, born 1986) =

Turkish-German footballer

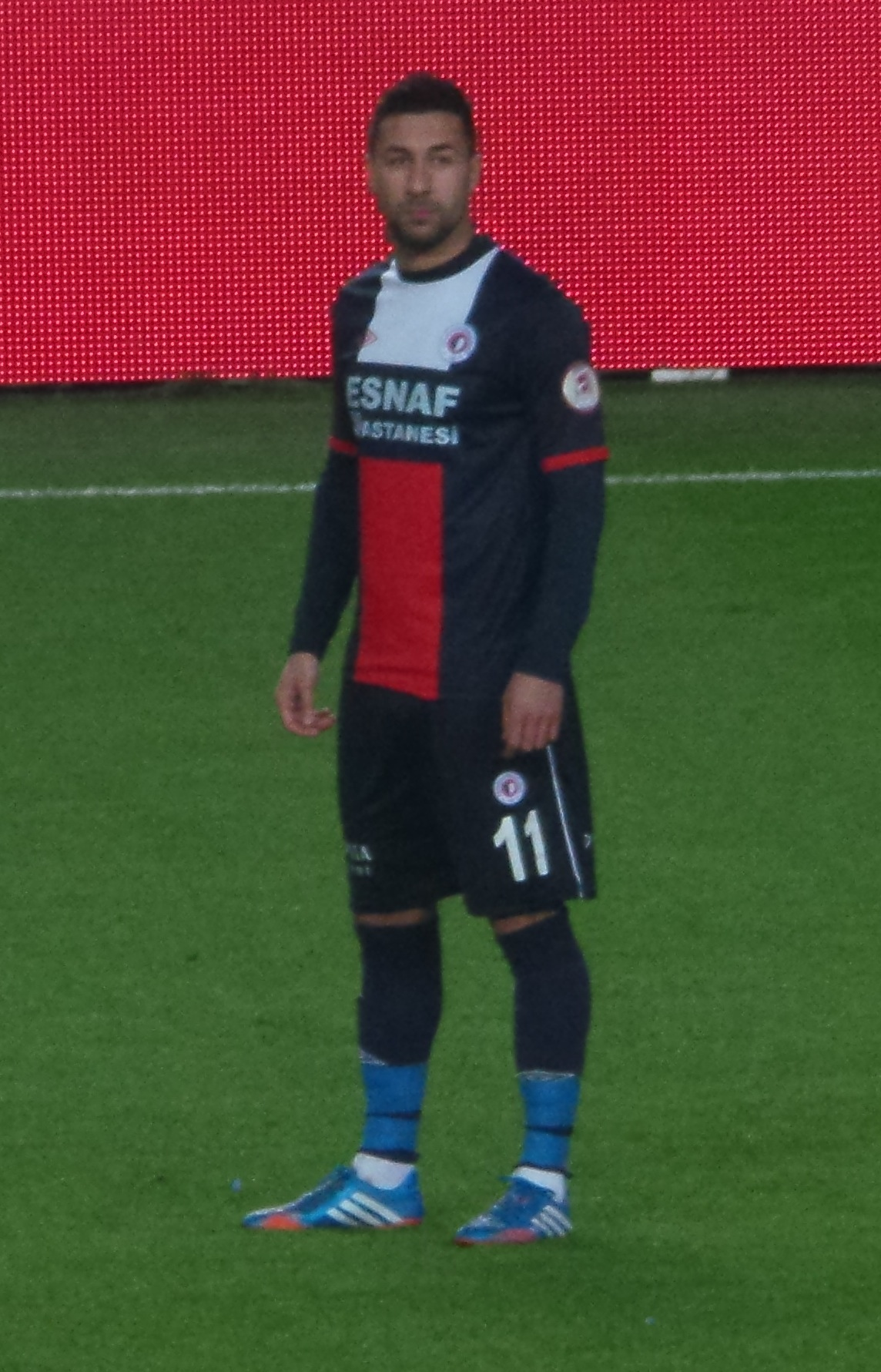
- Emre Öztürk in the ground.

Personal information
- Full name: Emre Öztürk
- Date of birth: 1 April 1986 (age 40)
- Place of birth: Heidelberg, West Germany
- Height: 1.79 m (5 ft 10 in)
- Position: Right winger

Youth career
- SG Dielheim
- FV Nußloch
- SV Sandhausen
- SV 98 Schwetzingen
- –2003: SV Waldhof Mannheim
- 2003–2005: VfL Wolfsburg

Senior career*
| Years | Team | Apps | (Gls) |
| 2006–2008 | VfL Wolfsburg II | 19 | (1) |
| 2006–2008 | VfL Wolfsburg | 0 | (0) |
| 2008–2011 | SV Sandhausen | 73 | (14) |
| 2011–2012 | Göztepe | 30 | (4) |
| 2013–2014 | Fethiyespor | 43 | (6) |
| 2014–2015 | Yeni Malatyaspor | 10 | (1) |
| 2015 | Fethiyespor | 14 | (3) |
| 2015–2016 | Kahramanmaraşspor | 30 | (5) |
| 2016–2017 | Kocaeli Birlik Spor | 6 | (0) |
| 2017 | Etimesgut Belediyespor | 11 | (1) |
| 2017–2018 | Niğde Belediyespor | 28 | (1) |
| 2018–2019 | Sivas Belediyespor | 12 | (1) |
| 2020 | Kemerspor | 3 | (1) |
| Total | | 279 | (38) |
- * Club domestic league appearances and goals

Emre Öztürk (born 1 April 1986) is a Turkish-German former professional footballer who played as a right winger.
