= Mustafa Öztürk =

Turkish theologian (born 1965)

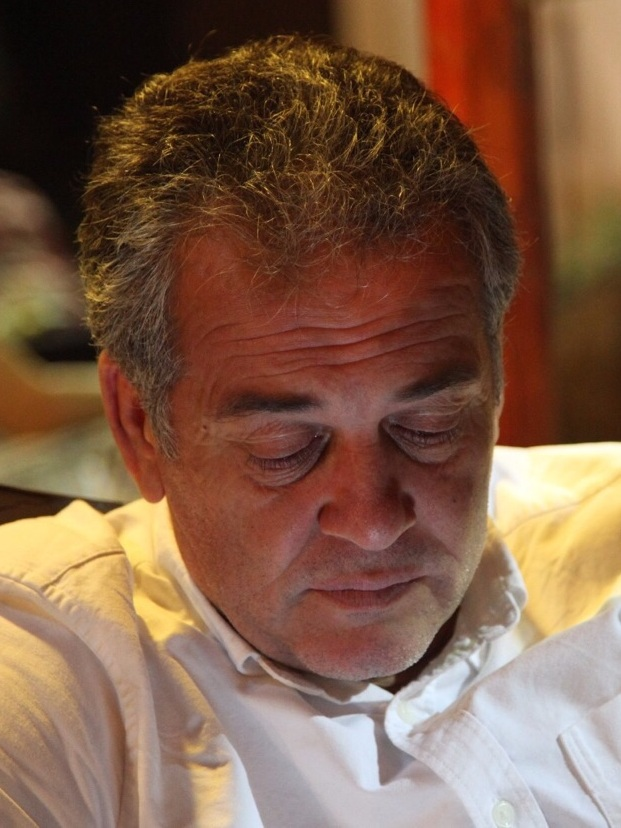
- Education: Marmara Üniversitesi İlahiyat Fakültesi (Theology)

Mustafa Öztürk (born 8 November 1965, Keşap, Giresun) is a Turkish theologian and academician who worked in the field of exegesis and Quran studies, and produced various scientific works. Öztürk is known for his historicist approach, which advocates that everything related to Islam, especially the Quran, should be interpreted according to their historical context.

Öztürk argues that many expressions in the Quran regarding issues such as slavery, concubinage, booty and punishments reflect the understanding of the period in which they were written. Therefore, such provisions specific to that period cannot be accepted as the basis of religion and should be abandoned.

== Views ==
=== Quran and science ===
Öztürk is against looking for scientific miracles in the Quran, which he considers to be a Western imitation. He rejects the claims of scientific miracles in some verses: The 30th verse of Anbiya Surah is about drought, The 88th verse of An-Naml is about the apocalypse. He claims that the Quran does not provide information about the formation of the universe, humans and other living things, and opposes both the views that "There is no evolution in the Quran" and "The Quran reported evolution" and states that the relevant verses point to resurrection.

=== Sharia / Secularism ===
Mustafa Öztürk defines secularism as the breathing tube of society and explains this with an example: According to Sharia, slaves / concubines were considered property; could be bought, sold, rented and shared. Al-Sarakhsi decided that the paternity determination of the child to be born could be made by draw, and Öztürk asks; how many of you can accept this understanding today?

=== Sunnah ===
Öztürk criticizes not accepting any religious source other than the Quran, and claims that the prophet made decisions (for things such as leaving the house) without waiting for the verse, and that the Quran comes after the sunnah and approves it, or warns and corrects it when it goes to the wrong place.

=== Change of belief ===
Öztürk points out Ahmed bin Hanbel's words, "Whoever says that Allah is everywhere is a heretic, an infidel. He should be invited to repent, but if he does not, he should be killed" and states that in early Islam, it was believed that Allah was in the sky. According to Öztürk, in the following centuries, we were faced with the fact that belief can change over time, which can be seen in the statement of the Ahl as-Sunnah scholar, theologian-commentator Fakhr al-Din al-Razi, "A place cannot be attributed to Allah, He is present and everywhere."

=== Relativity in morals ===
In his opinion, the debates about the marriage of the Islamic prophet Muhammad with Zaynab bint Jahsh, who was married to his adopted son, are an example of the relativity of morality.

The narration is as follows: "The Prophet sees Zaynab bint Jahsh while she is married to Zayd ibn Haritha, he likes her and begins to feel love for her. When he sees Zaynab, he says, "Allah, who turns hearts, is free from defective attributes." Zaynab bint Jahsh hears this and tells it to Zayd. Thereupon, Zayd wants to divorce Zaynab, but the Prophet says to Zayd, "Keep your wife with you, fear Allah." As a result, Zayd divorces his wife and then says, "You said so, but what is in your heart?" The verse "You were hiding" ( (Surat al Ahzâb:37) appears and thus Muhammad marries Zaynab, which is included in early Islamic history sources such as Narration Tabari.

Imam Mâturîdî condemned the fact that the marriage was attributed to Muhammad's influence from Zainab in Al-Tabarî's interpretation. Öztürk attributes the fact that one of the scholars said "it's like honey" and the other said "it can't be possible, it's immoral" to the difference in Arab and Turkish cultures.

=== Child marriage ===
Öztürk says that it is a tradition against child marriage, with examples such as Aisha and approximately 60 companions marrying at an early age. He says that the expression "the waiting period for those who have not yet menstruated is three months" in the 4th verse of At-Talâk was understood as "those who became widows before they reached puberty", not "those who could not menstruate due to an illness" until the modern age. According to him, child marriage would be prevented by seeing it not as a universal law but as an Arab custom of the time.

=== Religious communities ===
Öztürk, who also works as a columnist, was the first person to compare the community led by Fethullah Gülen with Assassins, criticizing him for being seen as an innocent imam, and criticized the effectiveness of communities with religious references, especially the Gülen Community, in the faculties of theology. He also criticized the ideology behind Islamic-referenced terrorism such as ISIS. While giving information to the Turkish Grand National Assembly Coup Commission, which was investigating FETO, he drew attention to the danger that other communities could pose.

=== Other opinions ===
Mustafa Öztürk brought the historicist perspective to the agenda by discussing the issue of universality/historicity of the Quran similar to Fazlur Rahman Malik. He opposes evaluating the provisions in the Quran independently of their place, time and addressees. He says that the verses in the Quran describing creation are not 'informative' but emphasize the power of Allah. His views attracted attention outside Türkiye and were discussed in scientific theses, various publications and theological journals.

== Some of his works and books ==
- Quran Language and Rhetoric, Kitâbiyat Publications., Ankara 2002.
- Quran and Extreme Commentary, (Doctoral Thesis), Kitâbiyat Publications, Ankara 2003.
- Reading the Quran in Its Own History, Ankara School Publications, Ankara 2004.
- Mutazili Interpretation of the Quran, Ankara School Publications, Ankara 2004.
- Research on the History of Tafsir, Ankara School Publications, Ankara 2005.
- The Language of Stories, Kitâbiyat Publications, Ankara 2006.
- Quran and Our Culture of Tafsir, Ankara School Publications, Ankara 2008.
- Our Meal Culture, Ankara School Publications, Ankara 2008.
- Ahl al-Sunnah & Shia Polemics in Tafsir, Ankara School Publications, Ankara 2009.
- On the Quran, Interpretation and Procedure -Problems, Determinations, Proposals-, Ankara School Publications, Ankara 2011.
- Translation of the Holy Quran, Düşün Publications, Istanbul 2011.
- Women from Ignorance to Islam, Ankara School Publications, Ankara 2012.
- Ottoman Tafsir Heritage, Ankara School Publications, Ankara 2012.
- Contemporary Islamic Thought and Quranism, Ankara School Publications, Ankara 2013.
- States of Tafsir, Ankara School Publications, Ankara 2013.
- Interviews, Polemics, Ankara School Publications, Ankara 2014.
- The Quran and Creation, Kuramer / Quran Research Center Publications, Istanbul 2015.
- The Nature of the Stories of the Quran, Kuramer / Quran Research Center Publications, Istanbul 2016.
- History of the Quran (with Hadiye Ünsal), Ankara School Publications, Ankara 2016.
- Seizing Power from Religious Capital: FETO, Ankara School Publications, Ankara 2017.
- On the Quran and Historicity, Ankara School Publications, Ankara 2018.
- Interpretation of Divine Address 1, Ankara School Publications, Ankara 2018.
- Politics, Faith, Religion, Ankara School Publications, Ankara 2019.
- Contemporary Approaches to the Quran, Ankara School Publications, Ankara 2019.
- Interpretation of Divine Address 2, Ankara School Publications, Ankara 2020.
- What is Riba and Interest and What is Not?, Ankara School Publications, Ankara 2021.
- Decision Letters 1, 2, 3; Ankara School Publications
- Critique of Traditional Islam Red Book Publishing House, Istanbul 2023.
- Interpretation of Divine Address 3, Ankara School Publications, Ankara 2023.
- The Soft Underbelly of Islamic Culture - Women, Kırmızı Kitap Publishing House, Istanbul 2024.
