= Semin Öztürk Şener =

Turkish female professional aerobatic display pilot

- Born: Semin Öztürk; 1991 (age 34–35)
- Education: Istanbul University
- Known for: First Turkish female civilian professional aerobatic pilot
- Relatives: Ali İsmet Öztürk (father)
- Website: www.seminozturk.com

Semin Öztürk Şener (born Semin Öztürk; 1991) is a Turkish female professional aerobatic display pilot. She is her country's first female civilian pilot to be recognized as a professional female aerobatic pilot.

== Personal life ==
Semin Öztürk was born into an aviation-related family in 1991. Her father Ali İsmet Öztürk is a professional aerobatic pilot, an aerobatic aircraft designer, aircraft maintenance technician and an aviation businessman. Her mother also holds a private pilot licence.

Following her graduation from the French high school Lycée Saint-Michel in Istanbul, she entered Istanbul University to acquire qualifications for certified translation in French language.

After her marriage on 18 August 2018, she took the surname Şener in addition to her own family name. Her father flew her to the wedding ceremony held at Sivrihisar, Eskişehir, in a helicopter.

== Early years ==
During her childhood, her playground was hangars, and inside of airplanes and helicopters. She experienced her first flight at the age of eight with her father in a Boeing-Stearman aircraft of 1942. Her father started to perform aerobatics when she was nine years old. She wanted to accompany her father at aerobatics. However, the compulsory parachute wearing during aerobatics was not possible for her due to her small size. Three years later, the 12-year-old girl enjoyed her first aerobatics flight with her father. From then on, she followed in her father's footsteps.

In the second grade at the university, she obtained the private pilot licence sponsored by Ayjet Flight School in Istanbul. She then went to the United States to be trained in aerobatics at the Tutima Academy of Aviation Safety located in King City, California.

== Aerobatics career ==
At the age of 21, Şener completed her first solo aerobatics flight, at Istanbul Hezarfen Airfield. Her aerobatics debut before an audience came during an air show held at Sivrihisar Aviation Center Necati Artan Sport Aviation Facility, of which her father is a founding member, in Sivrihisar on 19 September 2015. She became the first female civilian aerobatics pilot of Turkey. After performing more than ten aerobatics shows in the country, she displayed aerobatics as the youngest and the only female pilot at the air show Aeromania 2018 at Tuzla, Constanța in Romania on 14–18 July, where 35 international aerobatics aircraft took part.

She performs her aerobatics shows with a two-seat biplane Pitts Special S-2B aircraft powered by a 360 hp (270 kW) Lycoming engine. Whilst in two-month camps in preparations for air exhibitions, Şener has a strict diet to care for her blood pressure, an important consideration for the g-force changes during flights. At the International Sivrihisar Air Show In September 2018, she demonstrated for the first time duo aerobatics with her father.

Impressed by her show, the Wings Over the Rockies Air and Space Museum in Denver, Colorado, US, posted a 4 m × 5 m (13 ft × 16 ft) photograph of her in the exhibition room of physiology to encourage visitors to be excited and involved in aviation.
