= Ali Öztürk (footballer, born 1987) =

Turkish football striker

Personal information
- Date of birth: 12 April 1987 (age 39)
- Place of birth: Develi, Turkey
- Height: 1.91 m (6 ft 3 in)
- Position: Striker

Team information
- Current team: Kuşadasıspor
- Number: 7

Youth career
- 2006–2008: Balıkesir Belediyespor

Senior career*
Years	Team	Apps	(Gls)
2008–2016	Balıkesirspor	210	(46)
2016–2018	Manisa BB	66	(24)
2018–2020	24 Erzincanspor	43	(13)
2020–2021	Bergama Belediyespor	25	(4)
2021–	Kuşadasıspor	36	(3)
- * Club domestic league appearances and goals as of 13 November 2022

Ali Öztürk (born 12 April 1987) is a Turkish footballer who plays as a striker for Kuşadasıspor. He started his career in Altinoluk Belediyespor and then Balıkesir Belediyespor. After then he transferred to Balıkesirspor in youth team then signed his first professional contract in there.

He was born in Develi but spent long time in Altınoluk, Balıkesir.
