= Ali İsmet Öztürk =

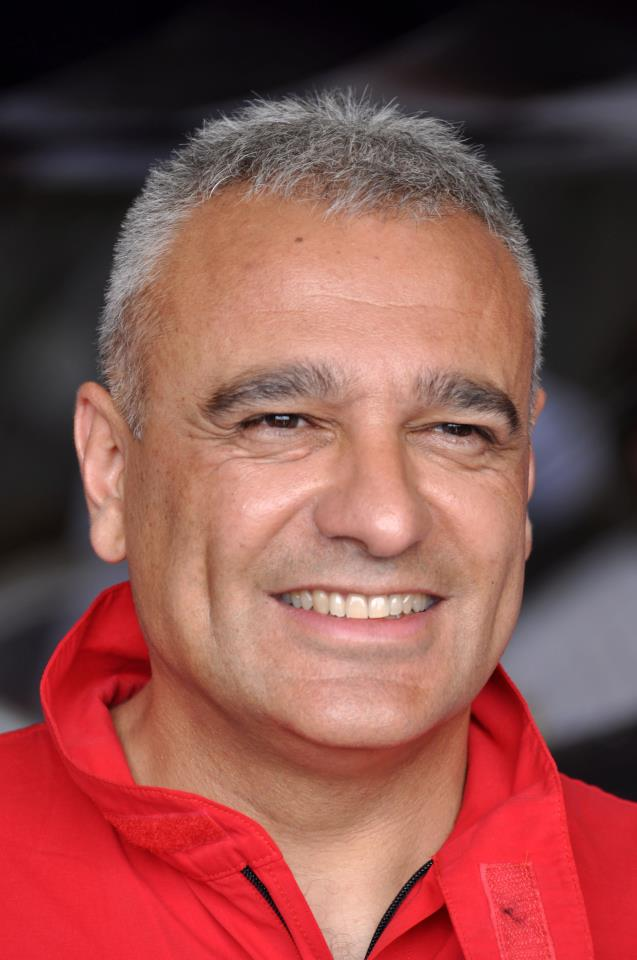
- Born: 23 May 1964 (age 62); Istanbul, Turkey
- Relatives: Semin Öztürk Şener (daughter)

Ali İsmet Öztürk (born 23 May 1964) is a Turkish professional display pilot, an aerobatic aircraft designer and an aviation businessman. He is the first civilian to be recognised as a professional aerobatic pilot in the country. He flies in international air shows in his custom designed and manufactured world-class performance aerobatic aircraft called "Turkish: Mor Menekşe" (Purple Violet).

Ali İsmet Öztürk has been recognised for his accomplishments in the air as an air show pilot, and on the ground for the aerobatic aircraft he builds. He is best known by air show fans and enthusiasts for his complex and technical manoeuvres. He was also the first professional civil pilot to perform an aerobatics display over the Bosphorus.

Between 2004 and 2008, Ali İsmet Öztürk performed in more than 80 international air shows, performing more than 559 displays in 19 different countries. He has performed before nearly 15 million spectators.

His enthusiasm for aviation has grown since he took his first solo flight. As an aviation enthusiast, he puts a strong emphasis on recognition and appreciation of aerobatics. He has said that he strives to be a positive role model and inspiration to young people in aviation. With a career devoted to furthering aviation, he participates in activities to raise public awareness of private aviation in Turkey. He takes part in fundraising activities and arranges aerobatic experience flights.

Ali İsmet Öztürk currently resides in Istanbul with his two daughters and works full-time both domestically and abroad as a professional display pilot, an aircraft designer, an aerobatic flight instructor and provides consultancy in the aviation sector. His daughter Semin Öztürk Şener is Turkey's first female professional civilian aerobatic pilot.

== Early years and introduction to aviation ==
Ali İsmet Öztürk was born in Istanbul on 23 May 1964.

In 1983, he completed his education in Lycée Français Saint Benoît (Saint Benoit French High School of Istanbul) where he had studied French literature and English. He received a Bachelor of Arts degree in Business Administration from Istanbul University.

His aviation career began in 1984, when he was 20 years old. That year he soloed for the first time an aircraft – an ultra-light. Since then he has had a long flying history with varied aviation experiences.

== Commercial aviation career ==
Ali İsmet Öztürk acquired his pilot license for fixed-wing aircraft in 1985. In 1988, he received a CPL License (for helicopters & airplanes). He obtained both IR (Instrument Rating) and ME (Multi-Engine) ratings for both airplanes and helicopters. He also became a flight instructor by getting his FI (Flight Instructor) License.

During these years, he led several projects on helicopter photography & video production and aerial live-broadcasting services on international basis. His works have been used in several films and broadcast on both national and international news.

At the end of 1989, he established his own Aviation Company, Mach Air Ltd. Headquartered in Istanbul Atatürk International Airport, the company offered FBO (fixed-base operator) services such as aircraft repair and maintenance, air taxi operations and aerial photography & filming.

While carrying out managerial duties in his company, Ali İsmet Öztürk continued to train for more flying qualifications. He obtained the AMT (Aircraft System & Maintenance Technician) Certificate and became a test pilot for both helicopters & airplanes. Since then he has test flown more than 50 different types of aircraft.

== Aerobatics career ==
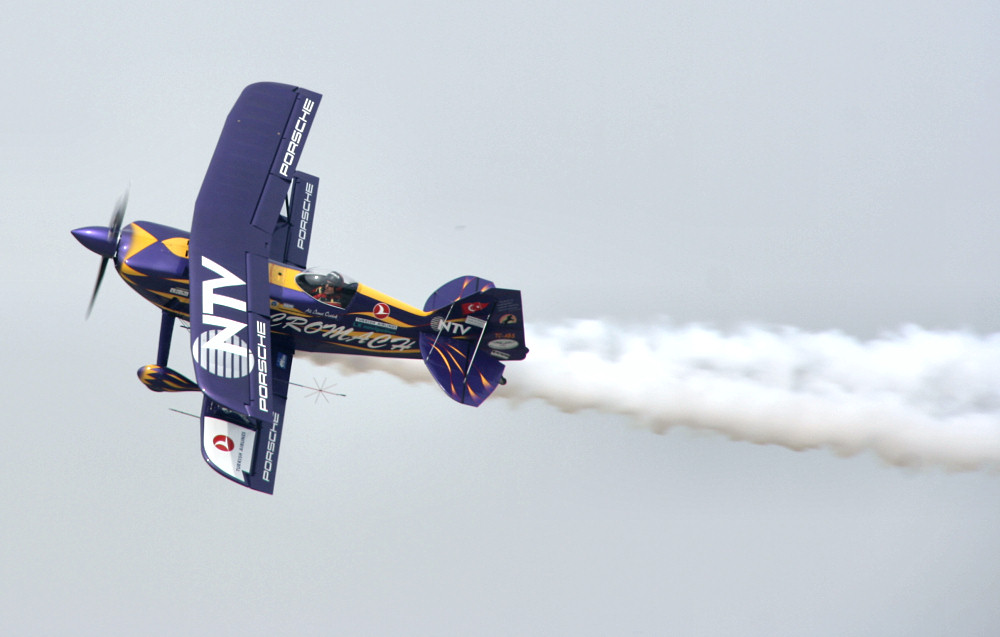
Ali İsmet Öztürk piloting his special biplane called "Purple Violet" at the Kraków Air Show, 2007

Ali İsmet Öztürk flew an aerobatic aircraft for the first time in a small side-by-side seated airplane with one of his friends in 1988. Performing in air shows became an ambition for him. Besides commercial piloting, he started out practicing aerobatics as well and as he developed aerobatics skills and he eventually purchased his first aerobatic biplane in 1992.

In the early 2000s, after 16 years of aviation history and entrepreneurial success in the international aviation arena, he decided to open a new chapter in his career. His goal was to be recognized worldwide in the field of air show aerobatics.

He has trained to prepare himself for air show performances. He has increased his ability to experience G levels up to +9/-6g He successfully passed the exams of UK CAA (United Kingdom, Civil Aviation Authorities) in Unlimited Level and earned his DA (Display Authorization) Certificate which gave him the authorization to display legally in all international air show organizations.

By 2003, Öztürk had designed and custom built the "Mor Menekşe" (Purple Violet), a single-seat aerobatic biplane with a modified airframe and engine (407 hp).

In 2005, he performed during the Royal International Air Tattoo (RIAT) held in the United Kingdom and known as the world's largest military air show. He the first civilian Turkish pilot to join the show and was awarded "the best aerobatic pilot" in the civilian category, as well.

In 2006, he performed in "ILA Berlin Air Show" organized by the German Aerospace Industries Association (Bundesverband der Deutschen Luft – und Raumfahrtindustrie e.V. – BDLI), the first Turkish pilot to be invited to the "world’s oldest aerospace trade show".

In 2007, he was honored by EAC (European Airshow Council) as the best professional airshow pilot.

In 2011, he performed in the International Festival of Aviation held in Izmir/Turkey, combining the "Air Show Türkiye 2011" (the leading event of the Centennial celebrations of the Turkish Air Force (TuAF)) with the European Air Chiefs (EurAC) and the Global Air Chiefs Conferences. During the organisation he soloed among aerobatic teams of the world. He was the only civilian professional aerobatic pilot from Turkey.

== Air show performances ==
Ali İsmet Öztürk is best known by air show fans and enthusiasts for his action-packed displays which involve positive and negative G maneuvers. His routines include high energy gyroscopic maneuvers.

== See also ==
- EURAC – European Air Chiefs' Conference Official Web Page, retrieved 2013-02-08
- "I partecipanti ai 100 anni a La Comina" (in Italian). Airplanes – The Italian Aviation Magazine (Pordenone, Italy), Issue: 5. Published on 2010-06-26/27.
- Michiels, Renaud (11 September 2007). "Cet avion n'est pas fait pour voler" (in French). Le Matin – People, Portrait (Lausanne, Switzerland: Tamedia Publications romandes SA). Page No. 28. "Alı Öztürk 43 ans, marie', deux enfants, Ali vit à Istanbul. Avec son biplan, ce voltigour Turc est l'une des grandes stars des meetings aériens européens."
