= Yusuf Öztürk (footballer) =

Turkish footballer (born 1979)

Personal information
- Date of birth: 8 February 1979 (age 47)
- Place of birth: Denmark
- Height: 1.80 m (5 ft 11 in)
- Position: Midfielder

Youth career
- Helsingør
- KB

Senior career*
Years	Team	Apps	(Gls)
1999–2000	Copenhagen	18	(0)
2000–2006	Fremad Amager	146	(12)
2006–2007	Ølstykke	27	(1)
2007	AB 70		
2008–2009	Ølstykke		
2009–2012	Skjold Birkerød		
- * Club domestic league appearances and goals

Yusuf Öztürk (born 8 February 1979) is a Turkish former professional footballer who played as a midfielder for FC Copenhagen in the Danish Superliga during 1999–2000 season, the Fremad Amager in Danish First Division during the 2005–06 season, and Ølstykke FC during the 2008–09 season. He also had stints in the lower tiers for AB 70 and Skjold Birkerød.
