= Ali (disambiguation) =

Ali was the fourth and last caliph of the Rashidun Caliphate and first Imam of shia from 656 to 661.

Ali may also refer to:

- Ali (name), the name and list of people of this name

== Film ==
- Ali (actor) (born 1967), an Indian actor primarily featured in Telugu films
- Ali (2001 film), an American biographical drama film about the American boxer Muhammad Ali
- Ali (2025 short film), a Bangladeshi-Philippine short film directed by Adnan Al Rajeev
- Ali (2025 feature film), Bangladeshi feature film directed by Biplob Hayder
- Ali: An American Hero, a 2000 American television film about Muhammad Ali
- Ali: Fear Eats the Soul, a 1974 West German film by Rainer Werner Fassbinder

== Languages ==
- Ali language, a language spoken in Central African Republic
- Ali language (Papua New Guinea)

== Music ==
- Ali (American rapper), member of St. Lunatics
- Ali (British singer) or Ali Tennant, British singer, songwriter and vocal producer/mentor
- Ali (French rapper), originally Daddy Ali (born 1975), French rapper of Moroccan origin
- Ali (French singer), a finalist at Eurovision France, c'est vous qui décidez! in 2021, a French singer of Lebanese origin
- Ali (Indonesian band), an Indonesian funk/disco band
- Ali (South Korean singer) or Cho Yong-jin (born 1984), South Korean musician, singer, songwriter and actress
- ALI (Alien Liberty International), a Japanese hip-hop/funk band
- Ali Project, Japanese musical band
- Ali, 2010 album by Mike G of Odd Future
- Ali (Vieux Farka Touré and Khruangbin album), 2022 album

== Places ==
- A'ali, a place in Bahrain
- Alì, a town in Italy
- Ali, Ardabil, a village in Ardabil Province, Iran
- Ali, Fars, a village in Fars Province, Iran
- Ali, Khuzestan, a village in Khuzestan Province, Iran
- Ali, Razavi Khorasan, a village in Razavi Khorasan Province, Iran
- Ali, Kazakhstan, a village in Almaty Region of south-eastern Kazakhstan
- Mount Ali in Taiwan
- Ali, Tibet, a town
- Ali Island in Papua New Guinea
- Ali Prefecture, a prefecture in Tibet, China

== Other uses ==
- Ali (character), a cartoon character created by Xu Han
- Ali, fictional character in the 1996 Indian film Rajkumar, played by Danny Denzongpa
- Storm Ali, a 2018 storm in Europe
- Aluminium monoiodide or AlI, a chemical compound

== See also ==
- Alley
- ALI (disambiguation)
- Alibaba Group (阿里巴巴集团), Chinese company commonly referred to as 阿里
- Alishan (disambiguation)
- Eli (disambiguation)
