= Alishan =

Alishan or Ali Shan may refer to:

== Places ==
- Alishan, Chiayi, a township in Chiayi County, Taiwan
  - Alishan National Scenic Area, a mountain resort and nature reserve
  - Alishan railway station
- Alishan Range, a mountain range in Taiwan

== People ==
- Alishan Bairamian (1914–2005), Armenian–American intellectual and author
- Ghevont Alishan (1820–1901), Armenian Catholic priest, historian and poet
- Leonardo Alishan (1951–2005), Armenian–Iranian writer and scholar
- Ali Shan (cricketer) (born 1994), Pakistani cricketer

== Other uses ==
- Alishan salamander, a species of salamander endemic to Taiwan

== See also ==
- Alishan Qeshlaqi, a village in Ardabil Province, Iran
- Alishanly, a village in the Masally Rayon of Azerbaijan
