= Qaleh-ye Ali =

Qaleh-ye Ali or Qaleh Ali (Persian: قلعه علي) may refer to:

- Qaleh-ye Ali, Hamaijan, Sepidan County, Fars Province
- Qaleh-ye Ali, Shesh Pir, Sepidan County, Fars Province
- Qaleh-ye Ali, Lorestan
