= Smbataberd =

Medieval fortress in Vayots Dzor Province, Armenia

Smbataberd Սմբատաբերդ
- Between Yeghegis and Artabuynk villages, Vayots Dzor Province, Armenia
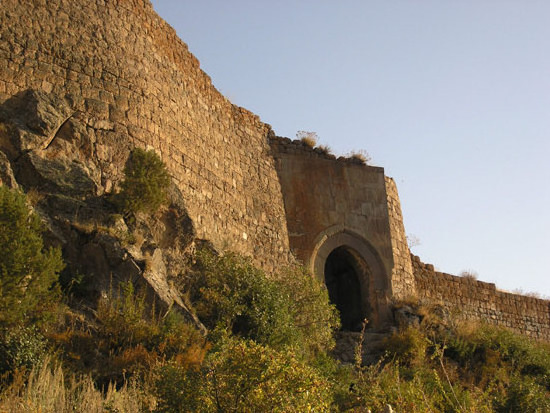
- Exterior fortification walls of Smbataberd

Site information
- Type: Fortress
- Open to the public: Yes
- Condition: Exterior fortification walls, towers and the keep are still intact

Location
- Shown within Armenia Smbataberd; Սմբատաբերդ (Vayots Dzor)
- Coordinates: 39.871736°N 45.338113°E

Site history
- Built: Possibly founded in the 5th century and fortified during the 9–10th and 13th centuries

Smbataberd (Armenian: Սմբատաբերդ Armenian pronunciation: [səmbɑtɑˈbɛɾtʰ]) is a medieval fortress located upon the crest of a hill between the villages of Artabuynk and Yeghegis in the Vayots Dzor Province of Armenia. It may have existed as early as the 5th century or earlier, although other sources date it to the 9th to 11th centuries. Its large basalt walls have been well preserved, but much less remains of the structures inside the fortress. It served as the main fortress of the Armenian princes of Syunik when Yeghegis was the seat of the rulers of that province. It was further expanded in the 13th century under the Orbelian dynasty. It is now a notable tourist site in Vayots Dzor.

== Name ==
Smbataberd means "fortress of Smbat" in Armenian and has traditionally been called by this name by the inhabitants of the area. The construction and name of Smbataberd are traditionally connected with the 10th-century prince Smbat of the Syuni dynasty. According to another view, the local inhabitants gave the fortress this name because the Orbelian ruler Smbat (r. 1251–1273) is buried nearby in the settlement of Yeghegis. Scholar Ghevont Alishan considered the name to be purely folkloric in origin and referred to the fortress by the name of the nearby monastery of Tsaghats Kar. The name Smbataberd has sometimes been used to refer to the fortress and Yeghegis taken together, although they are separated by 1–2 kilometers.

== Location and description ==
The ruins of the fortress are located on the summit of one of the southwestern branches of the Vardenis mountain range, at an altitude of about 2000 meters above sea level. This high-altitude mountain spur is bordered by the Yeghegis River gorge to the southeast and the village of Artabuynk to the northwest; in these areas, the fortress is naturally protected by steep and inaccessible slopes, while to the northeast, it gradually merges with the surrounding terrain. It occupies an exceptionally strategic position: protected on three sides (eastern, western, and southern) by precipitous cliffs, which are further reinforced by defensive walls. The massive, pyramid-shaped defensive ramparts surrounding the fortress have remained relatively well-preserved. The walls are constructed from large, wedge-shaped dressed basalt stones, as well as unhewn rocks, bound together with lime mortar. The thickness of the fortification walls ranges from 2 to 3 meters, while the semi-circular towers positioned along the perimeter reach a height of 8 to 10 meters. This topographic position allowed the garrison to monitor the surrounding canyons and mountains, providing timely warnings of approaching enemies.

The fortress is divided by an internal wall into northern and southern sections, each of which possessed its own citadel. Within the fortress grounds, apart from the buildings adjacent to the defensive walls and the faintly visible foundations of the citadel situated at the highest point, almost nothing else has survived. Some ruins of residential structures and water reservoirs have been preserved. A portion of the structures inside Smbataberd likely served as special princely residences built during the 13th century.

The fortress features three entrances—northern, eastern, and western—though access and entry are possible only through the main northern gate. The northern and eastern entrances are designed as vaulted galleries, above which the ruins of guard posts and watchtowers are still preserved. The fortress received its water supply via a pipeline connected to springs located near the Tsaghats Kar monastery.

== History ==
Some sources indicate that Smbataberd was constructed during the 9th, 10th, or 11th centuries, although other researchers suggest that it could have existed as early as the 5th century or even earlier, undergoing major reinforcement in the 10th century. Smbataberd served as the citadel for the settlement of Yeghegis, which was the seat of the Syuni princes of Syunik during the 9th and 10th centuries. The construction and naming of Smbataberd are traditionally associated with the 10th-century prince Smbat Syuni (whom Stepannos Orbelian mentions as a prominent figure living around the year 936). In the 970s, with the establishment of the Kingdom of Siunik, the branch of the ruling Syuni dynasty designated Kapan as their capital, while another branch of the family maintained its seat in Yeghegis. In either 1002 or 1003, the Syuni branch established in Yeghegis submitted to the suzerainty of King Gagik I of the Bagratid Kingdom of Armenia.

According to historian and archaeologist Sedrak Barkhudaryan, during the rule of the Syunis of Yeghegis, Smbataberd, the settlement of Yeghegis, and the Tsaghats Kar monastery formed an "architectural, spiritual, and political unity" and served as the center of the Vasakian dynasty in Vayots Dzor. This branch lost most of its political significance after the fall of the Bagratid Kingdom (1045) and was eventually succeeded by the Orbelian dynasty, who gained control over most of Vayots Dzor and Syunik during the 13th century. Yeghegis reached the peak of its power in the 13th century under the Orbelians, who established it as their princely seat. The Orbelian ruler Smbat (reigned 1251–1273) reconstructed and fortified Smbataberd.

Throughout its existence, Smbataberd withstood several sieges. Notably, in the early 10th century, it was successfully defended against Nasr, a commander of the Sajid dynasty sent by Yusuf ibn Abi'l-Saj. According to a popular folk tradition, the Seljuks eventually managed to capture the fortress by cutting off its water supply; they discovered the source of the water pipeline with the help of a thirsty mule or horse.

The northern and eastern entrances pass through barrel-vaulted galleries, upon whose roofs watchtowers (observation posts) were once positioned. The fortress possessed two citadels—western and eastern—divided by a common wall and constructed at the highest topographic points. The western citadel is poorly preserved, though the foundation walls of rectangular and quadrangular structures remain discernible here. In contrast, the eastern citadel is incomparably better preserved. It extends in a semi-circular fashion along the highest, rocky peak of the fortress, with its walls reaching a height of up to three meters in certain sections. Its sole entrance is located on the western side. Internally, it features rooms that connect with one another via corridors. Within the fortress grounds, adjacent to the fortification walls, lie the ruins of numerous structures and barracks constructed from fractured basalt stone.

== Restoration efforts and tourism ==
Certain parts of the fortress were restored in 2006–2007. Restoration and cleaning work at Smbataberd was also conducted in 2011 at the initiative of the Ministry of Culture of Armenia. The fortress walls were reinforced to prevent their collapse. Traces of additional structures within the fortress were uncovered during the course of the restoration, which led to the halting of the restoration work. In June 2018, the Armenian government declared Smbataberd a protected historical-cultural reserve. Smbataberd has become a prominent tourist attraction in Armenia.

== Gallery ==
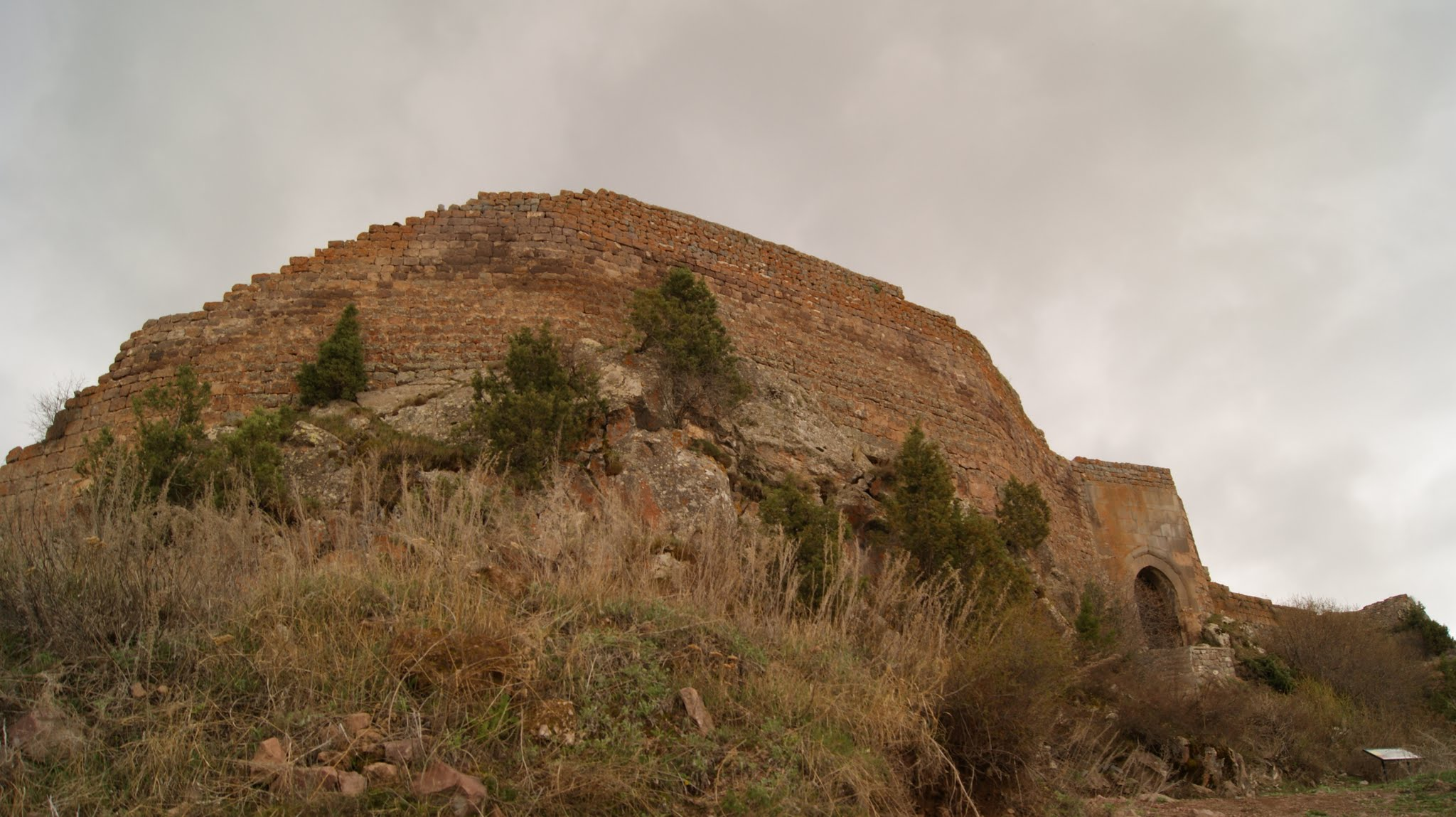

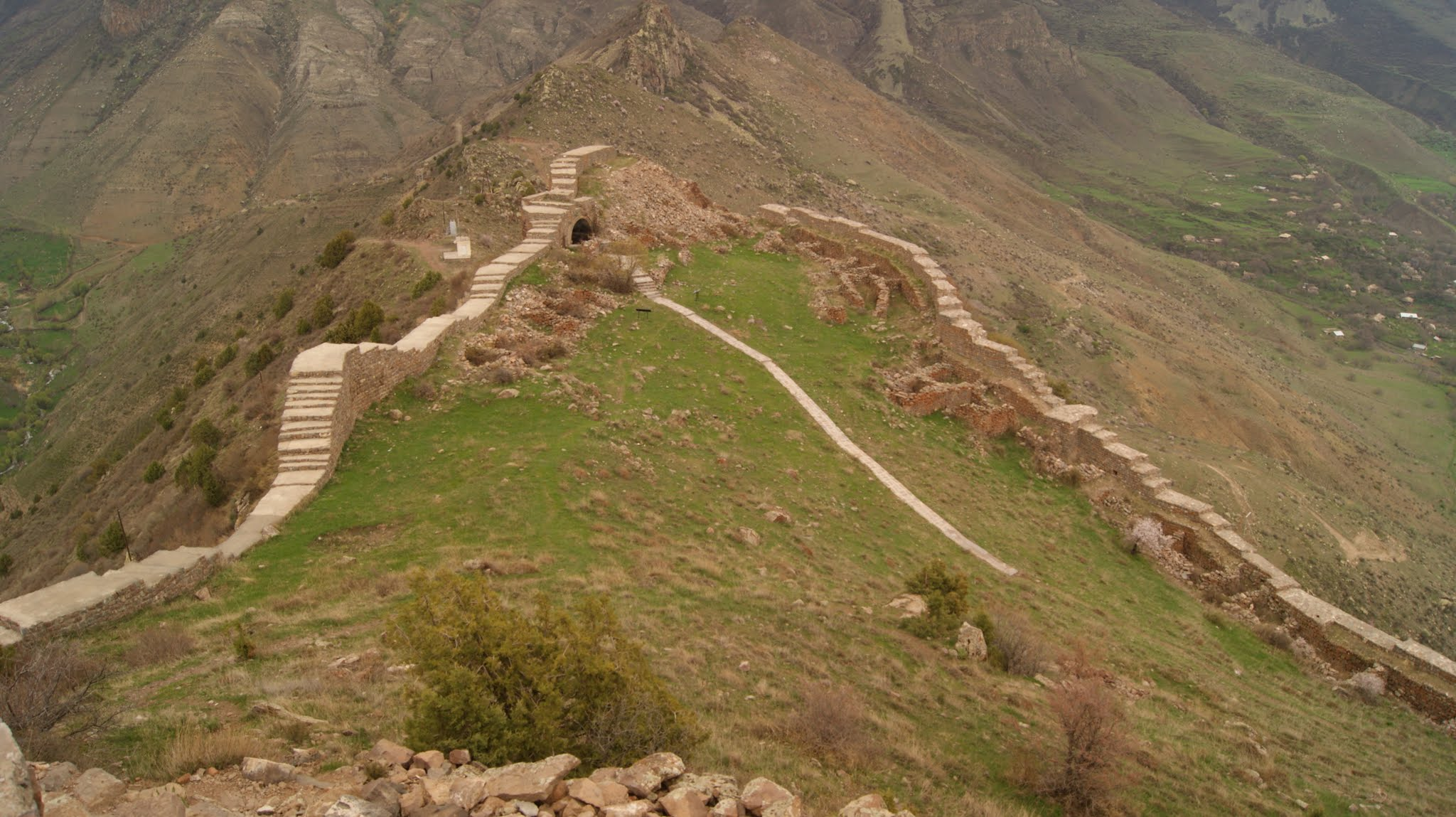

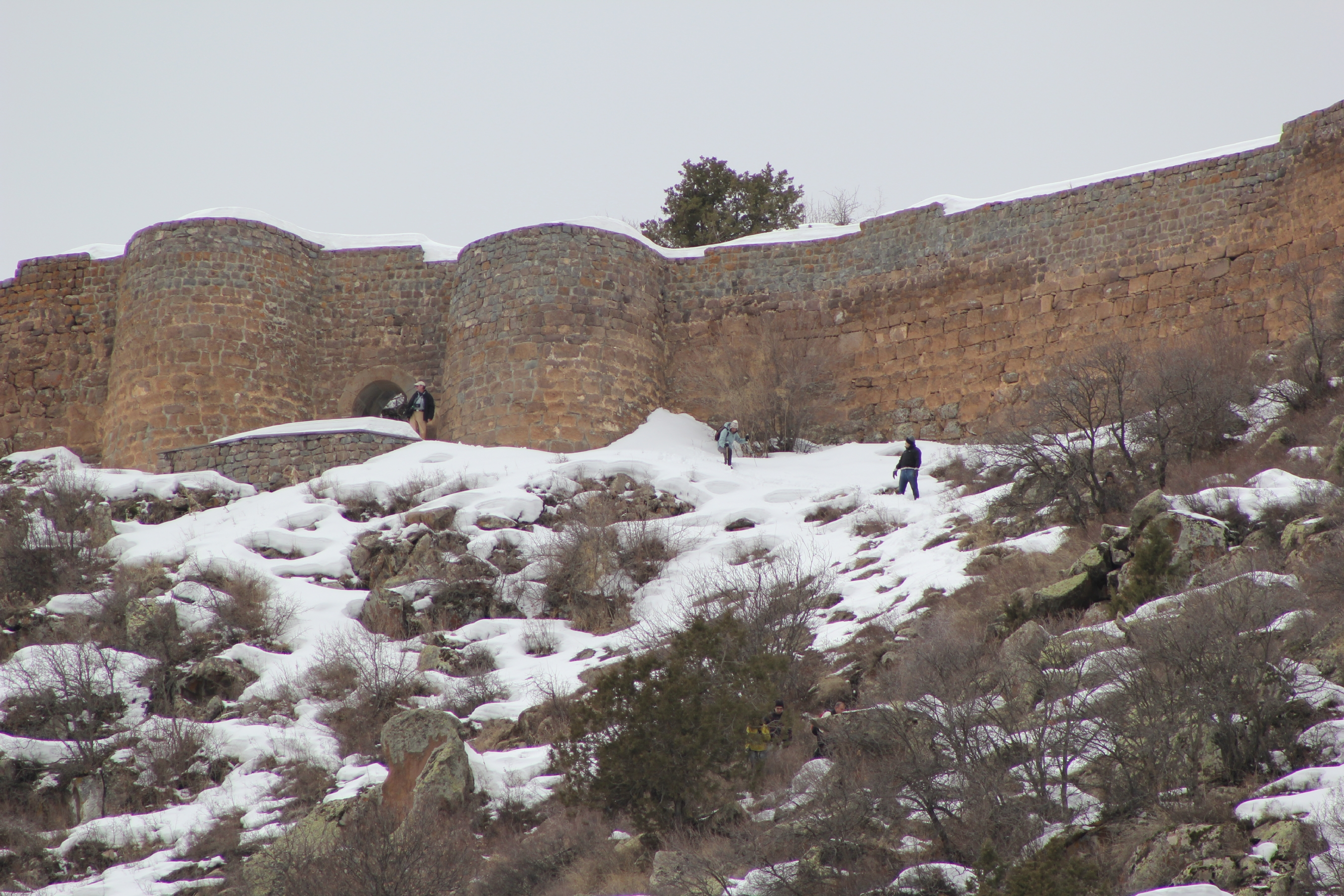

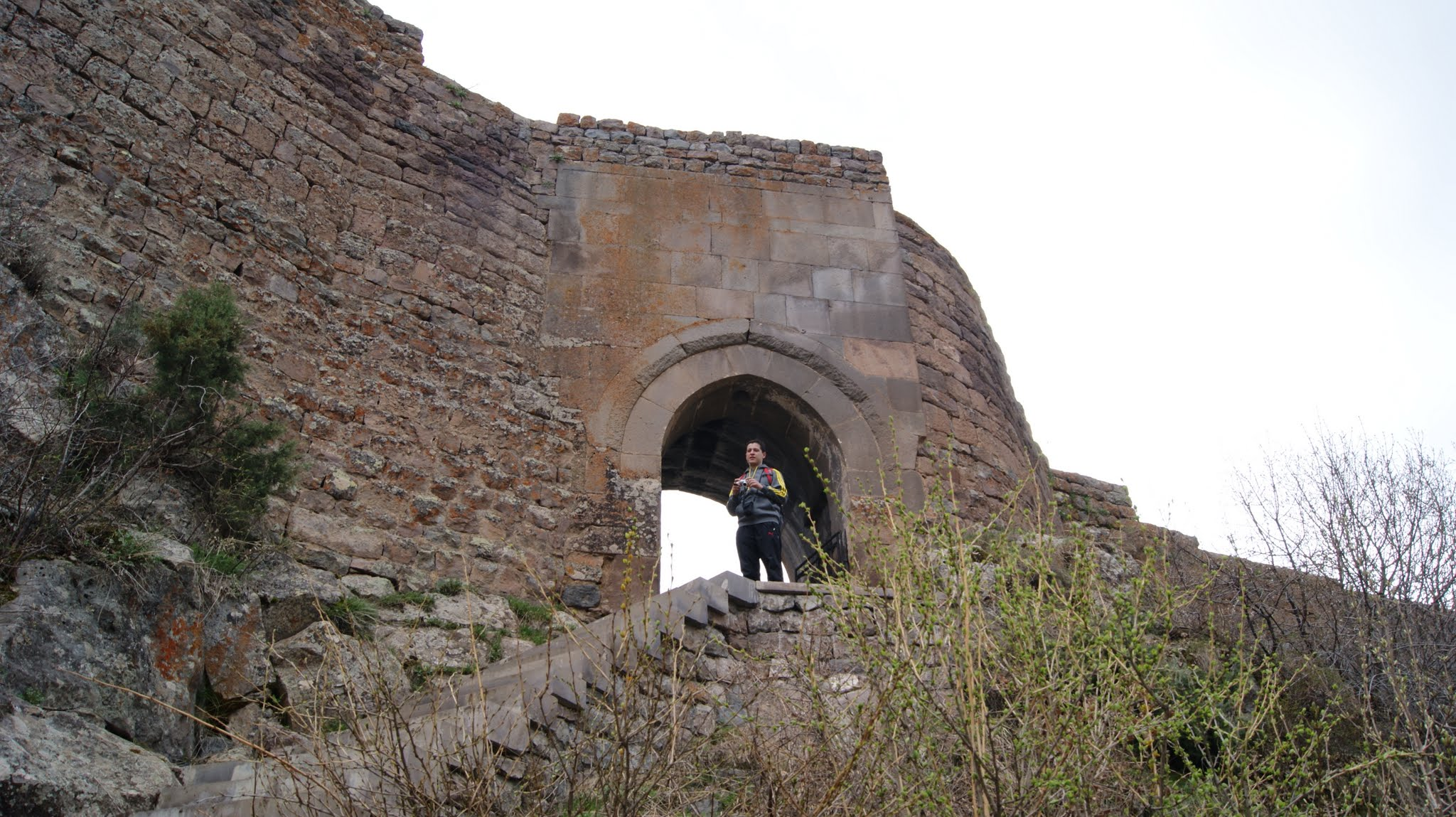

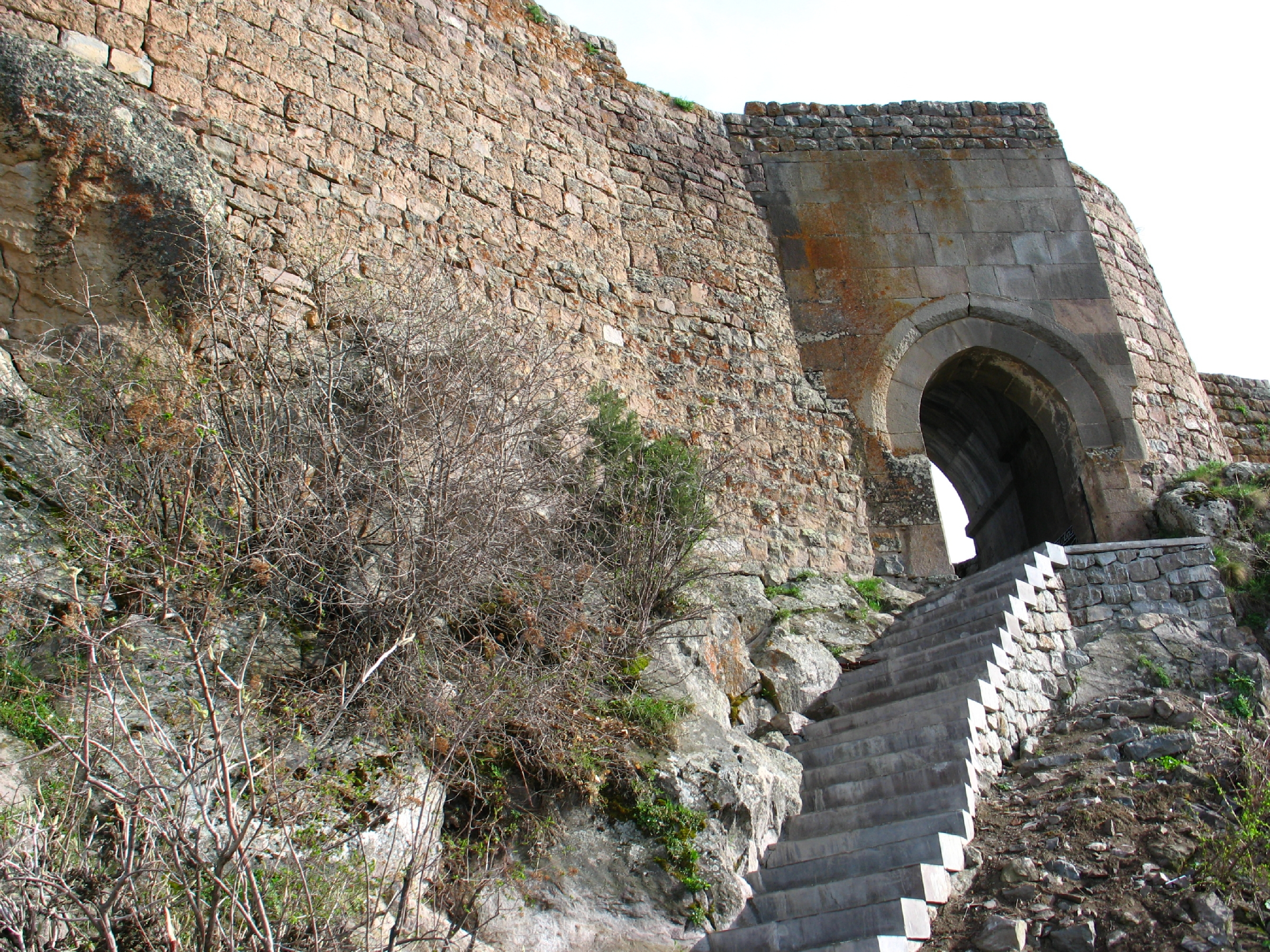

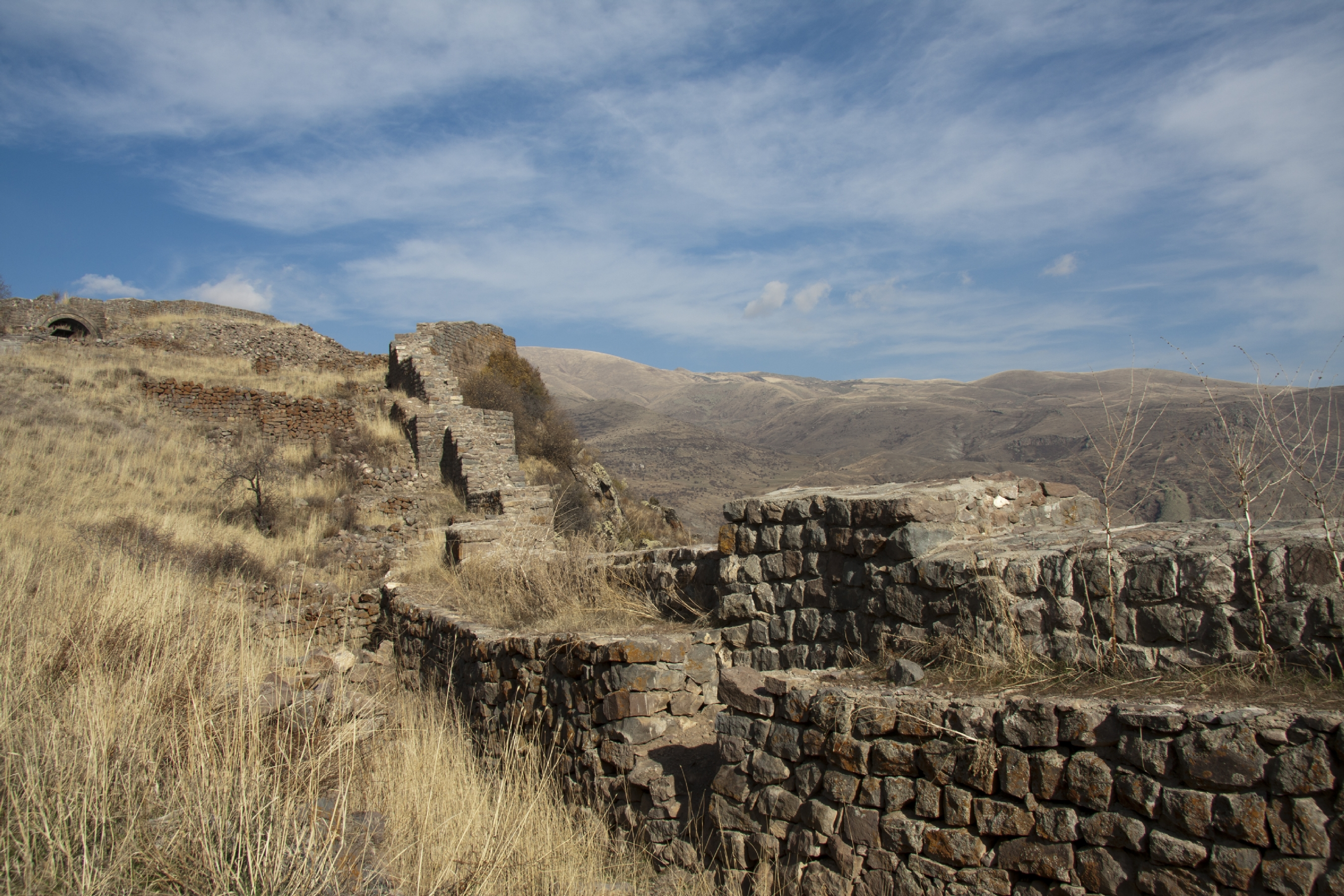

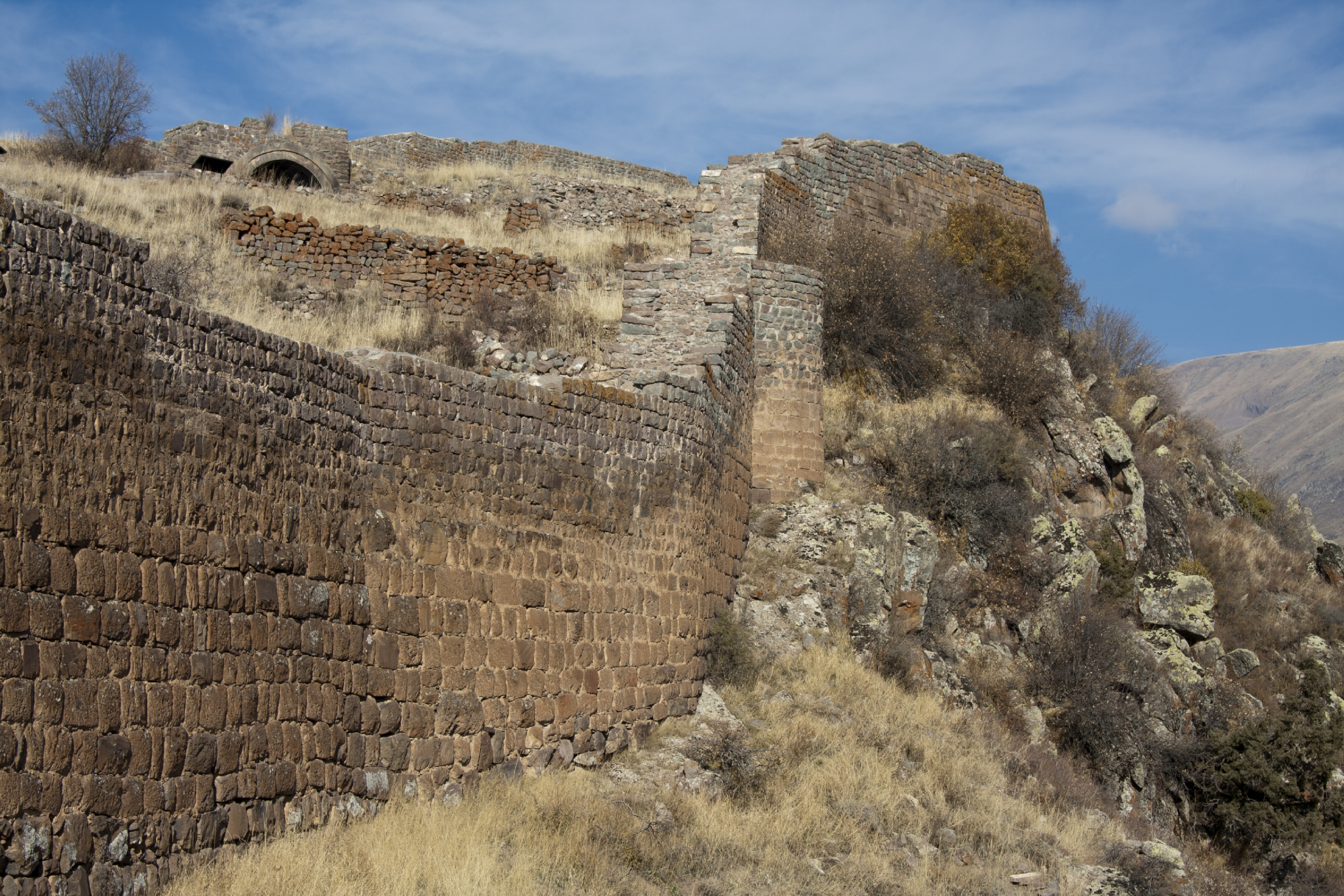

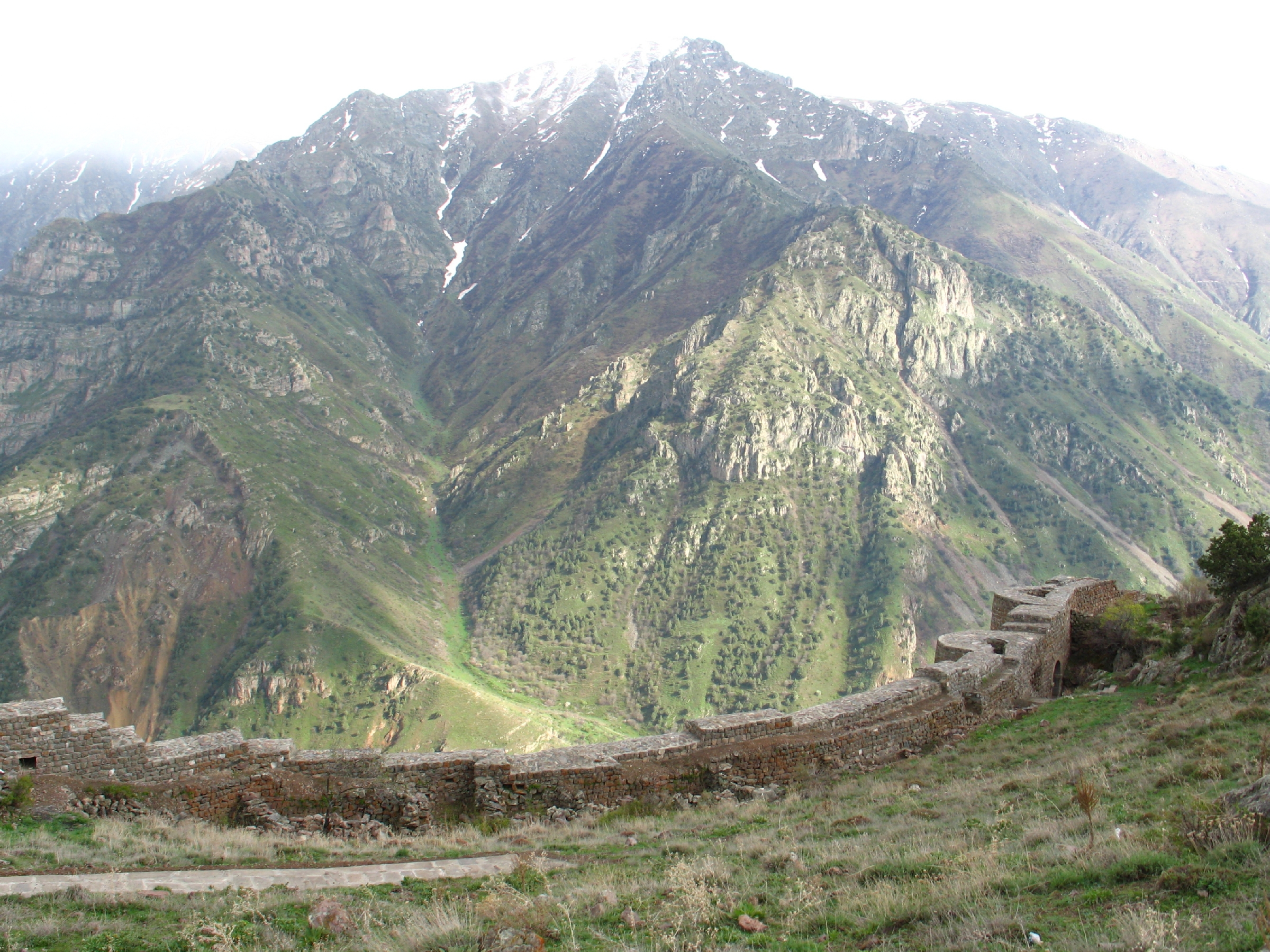

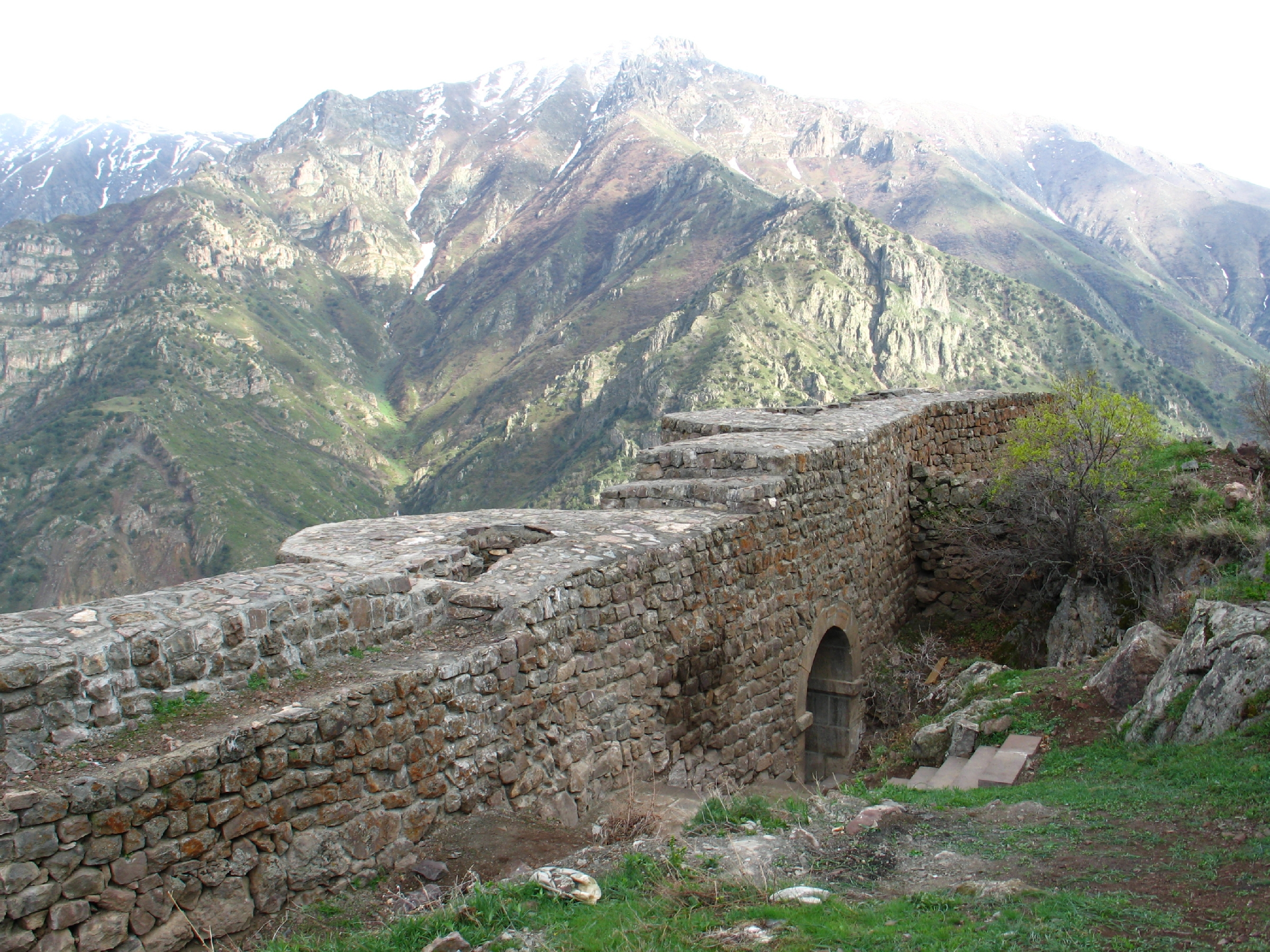

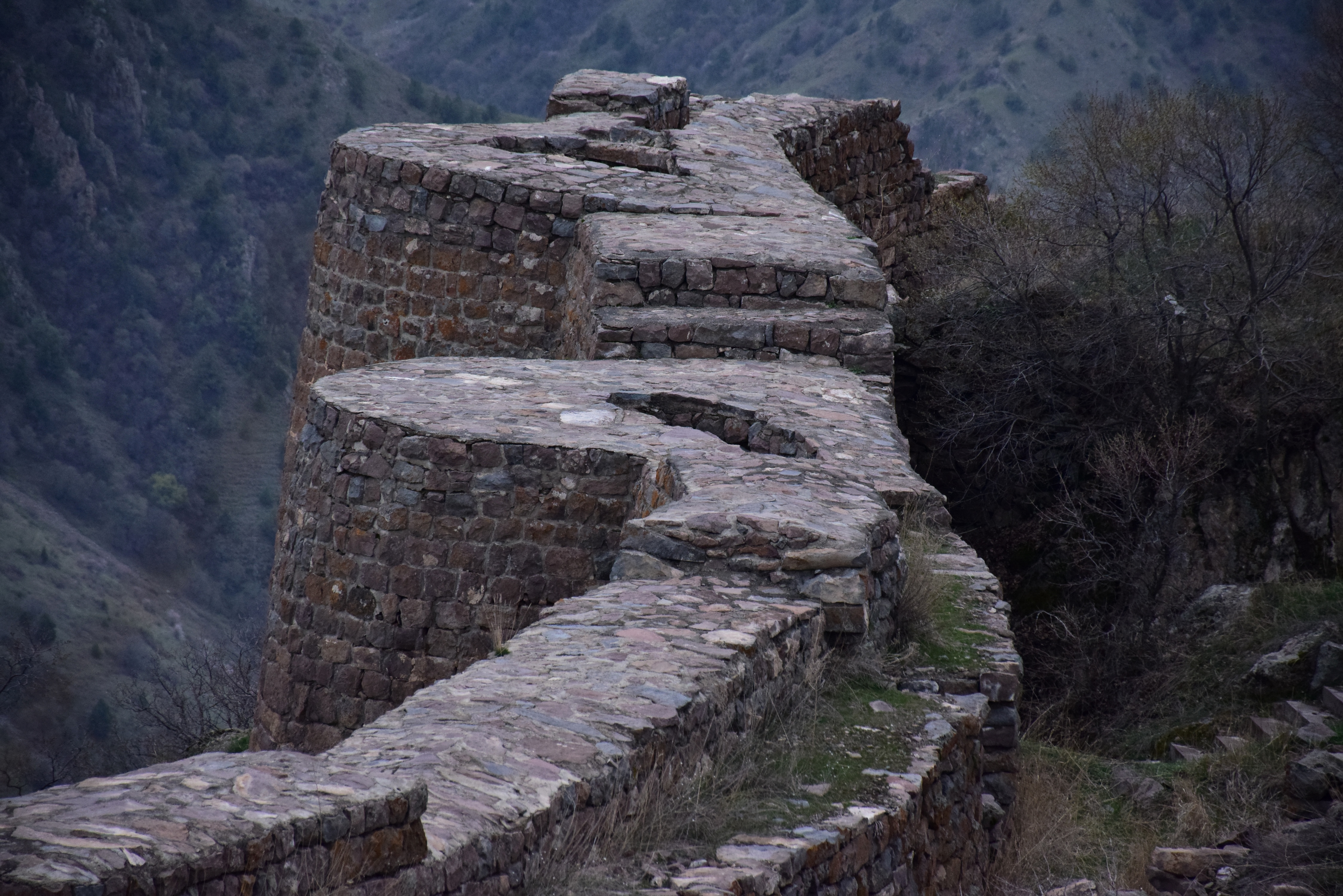

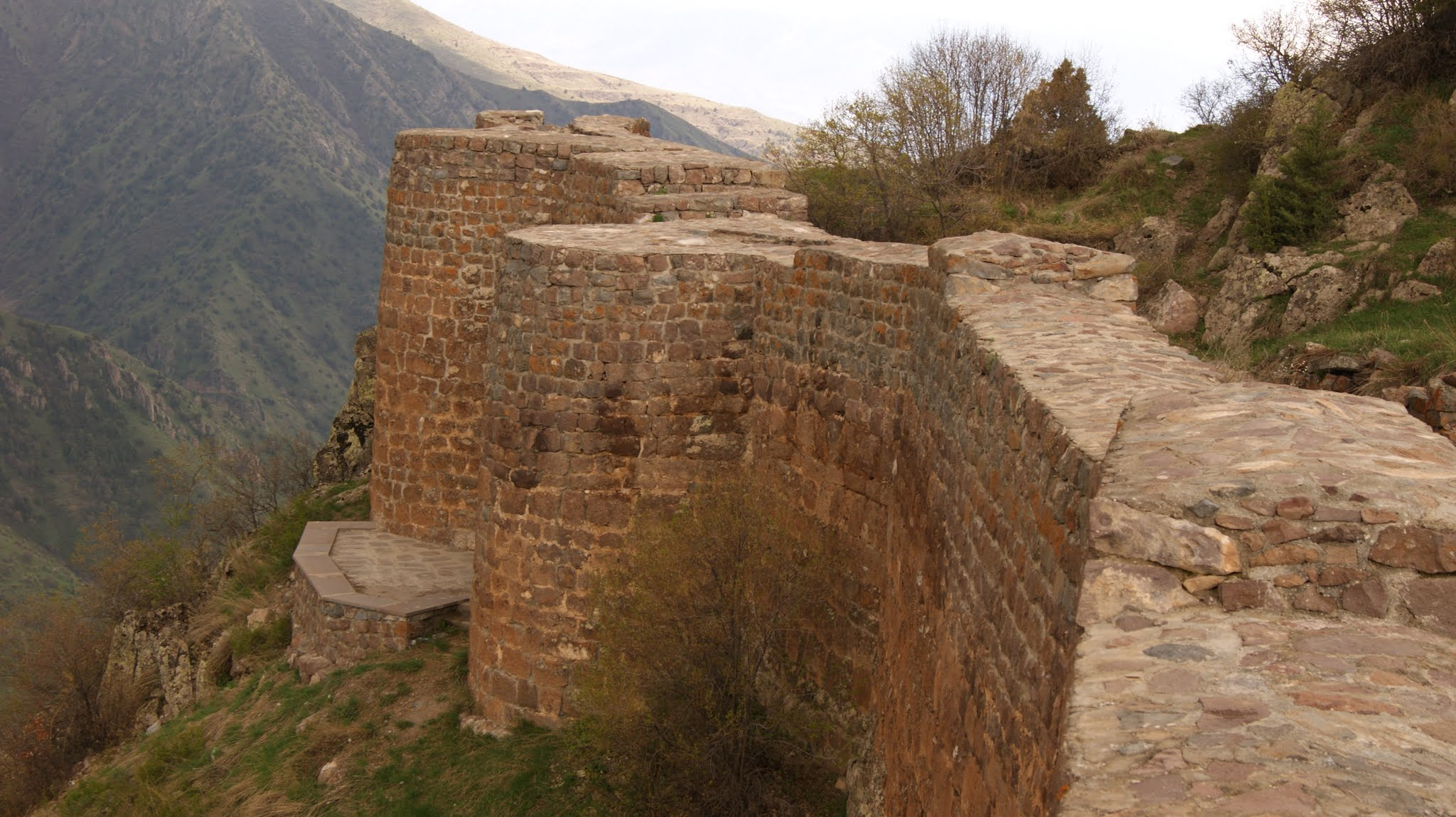

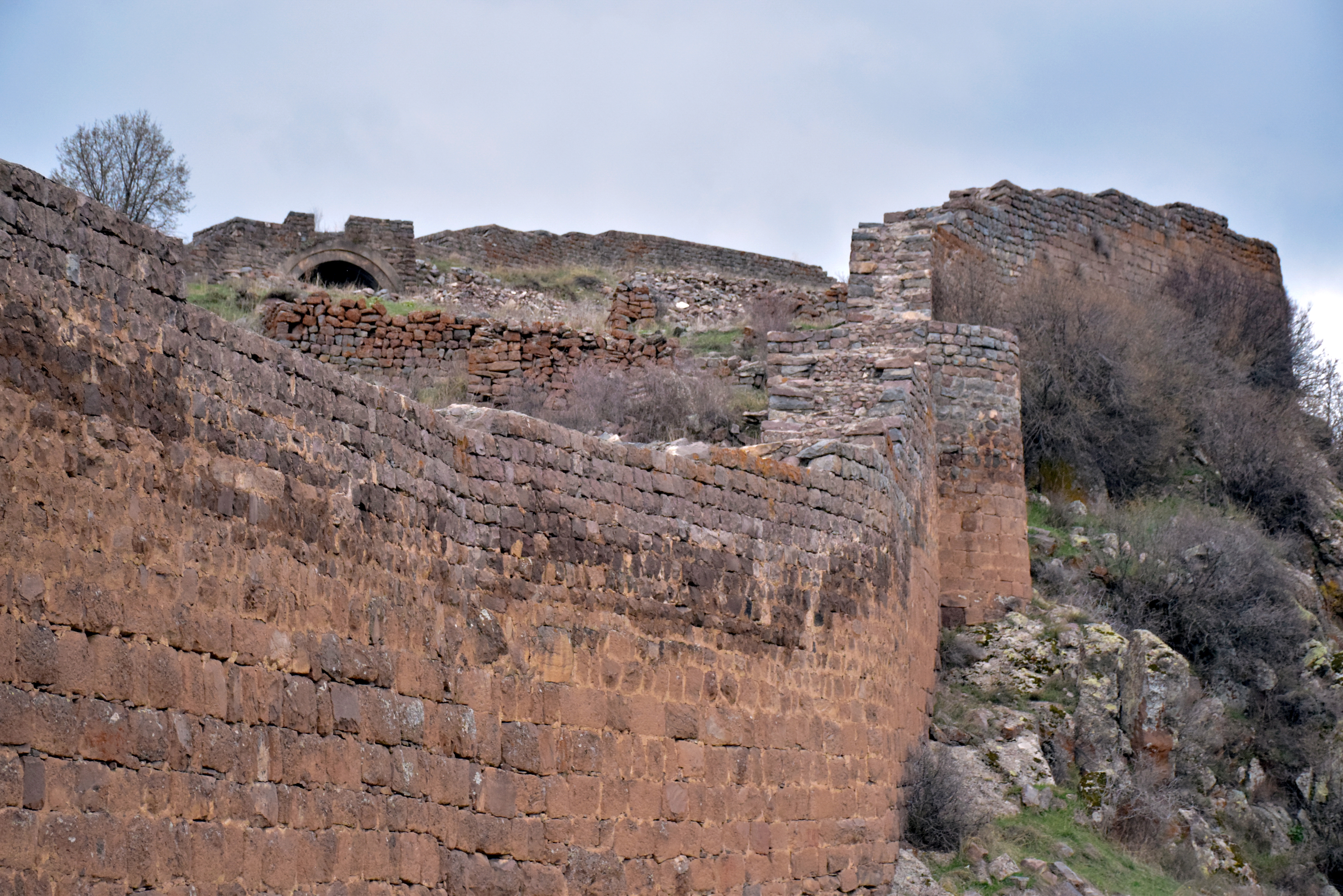

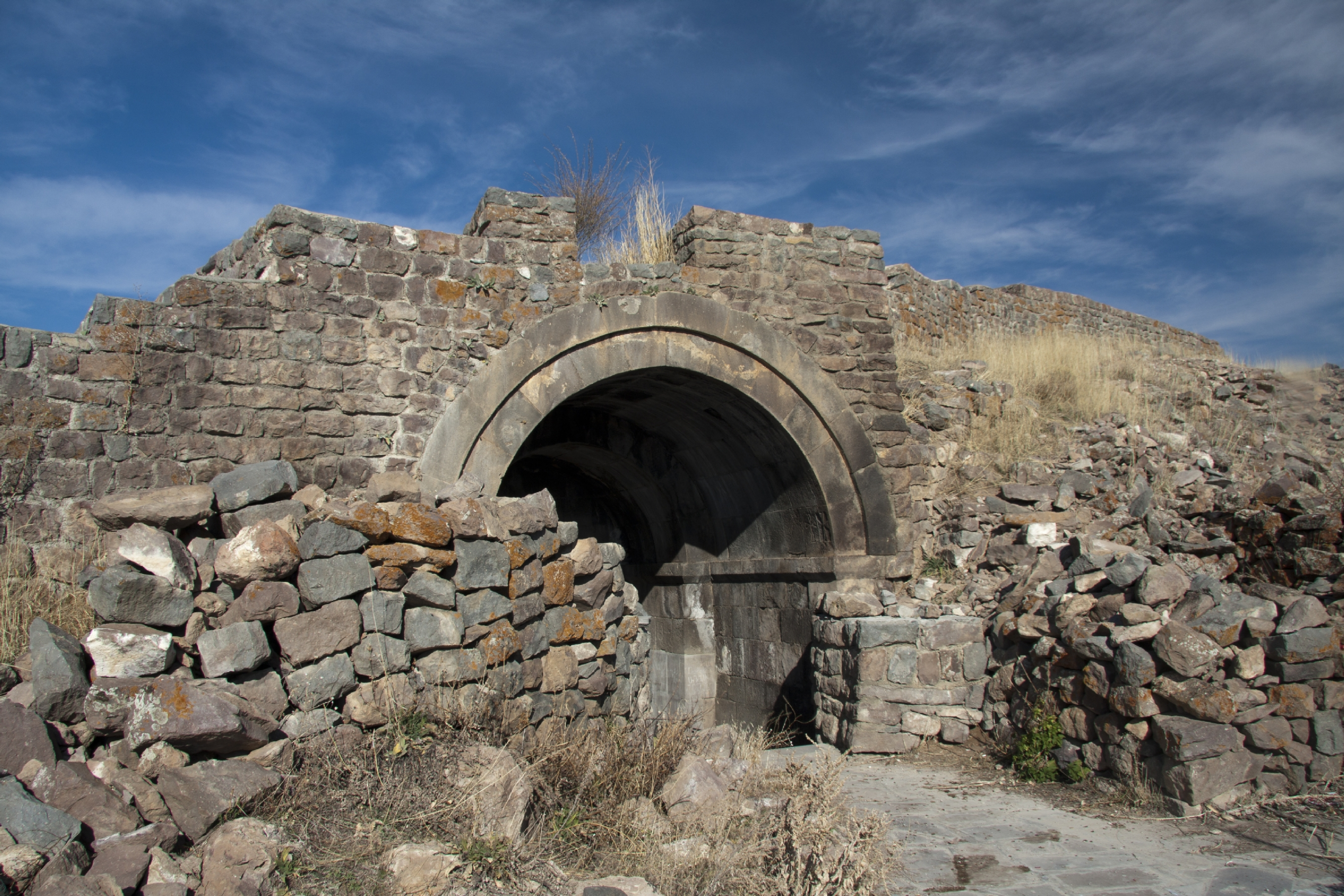

== Sources ==
- Alishan, Ghevont (1893). Sisakan: Teghagrutʻiwn Siwneatsʻ ashkharhi [Sisakan: geography of the province of Syunik] (in Armenian). Venice.
- Yeghiazarian, H. (1955). Azizbekovi shrjani kulturayi hushardzannerě [The cultural monuments of Azizbekov district] (PDF) (in Armenian). Yerevan: Haypethrat. pp. 51–52.
- Grigoryan, Anna (2018). "Smbataberdě: patmamshakutʻayin karevor nshanakutʻyan, naev zbosashrjayin vayr" [Smbataberd: a place of historical-cultural importance, also a tourist site]. Armenpress. Archived from the original on 20 June 2018.
- Hakobian, T. Kh.; Melik-Bakhshian, S. T.; Barseghian, H. Kh. (1988). "Eghegikʻ". Hayastani ev harakitsʻ shrjanneri teghanunneri baṛaran [Dictionary of Toponymy of Armenia and Adjacent Territories] (in Armenian). Vol. 2. Erevani hamalsarani hratarakchʻutʻyun. pp. 182–183.
- Hasratian, M. (1984). "Smbataberd". In Arzumanian, Makich (ed.). Haykakan sovetakan hanragitaran [Armenian Soviet Encyclopedia] (in Armenian). Vol. 10. Yerevan. p. 455.
- Holding, Deirdre (2014), Armenia with Nagorno Karabagh: The Bradt Travel Guide (4th ed.), Guilford, Connecticut: The Globe Pequot Press, ISBN 978-1-84162-555-3
- "Smbataberd". Hushardzan.am. 5 October 2016. Archived from the original on 9 February 2023.
- ""Smbataberd" patmamshakutʻayin argelotsʻ" ["Smbataberd" historical-cultural reserve]. Hushardzan.am. 2018. Archived from the original on 23 March 2023.
- Stone, Michael E.; Topchyan, Aram (2022). Jews in Ancient and Medieval Armenia: First Century BCE to Fourteenth Century CE. Oxford University Press. ISBN 9780197582077.
