= Erdapin =

Erdapin may refer to:

- Artabuynk, Armenia
- Yeghegis, Armenia
