= Ali, Iran =

Ali (Persian: عالي or الي), in Iran, may refer to:

- Ali, Khuzestan (عالي - ‘Ālī)
- Ali, Razavi Khorasan (الي - Ālī)
