= ALI =

ALI may refer to:

- ALI (band), a multinational band from Shibuya, Japan
- Acer Laboratories Incorporated, IC manufacturer
- Acute limb ischemia, caused by sudden blood flow loss
- Acute lung injury
- Albion station (Michigan), U.S. (station code: ALI)
- Alice International Airport, Texas (IATA: ALI)
- American Law Institute
- Annual limit on intake of radiation
- Automatic Location Information, a database to locate emergency service caller

== See also ==
- Ali (disambiguation)
- Ali (name)
