= Artabuynk =

Artabuynk Արտաբույնք
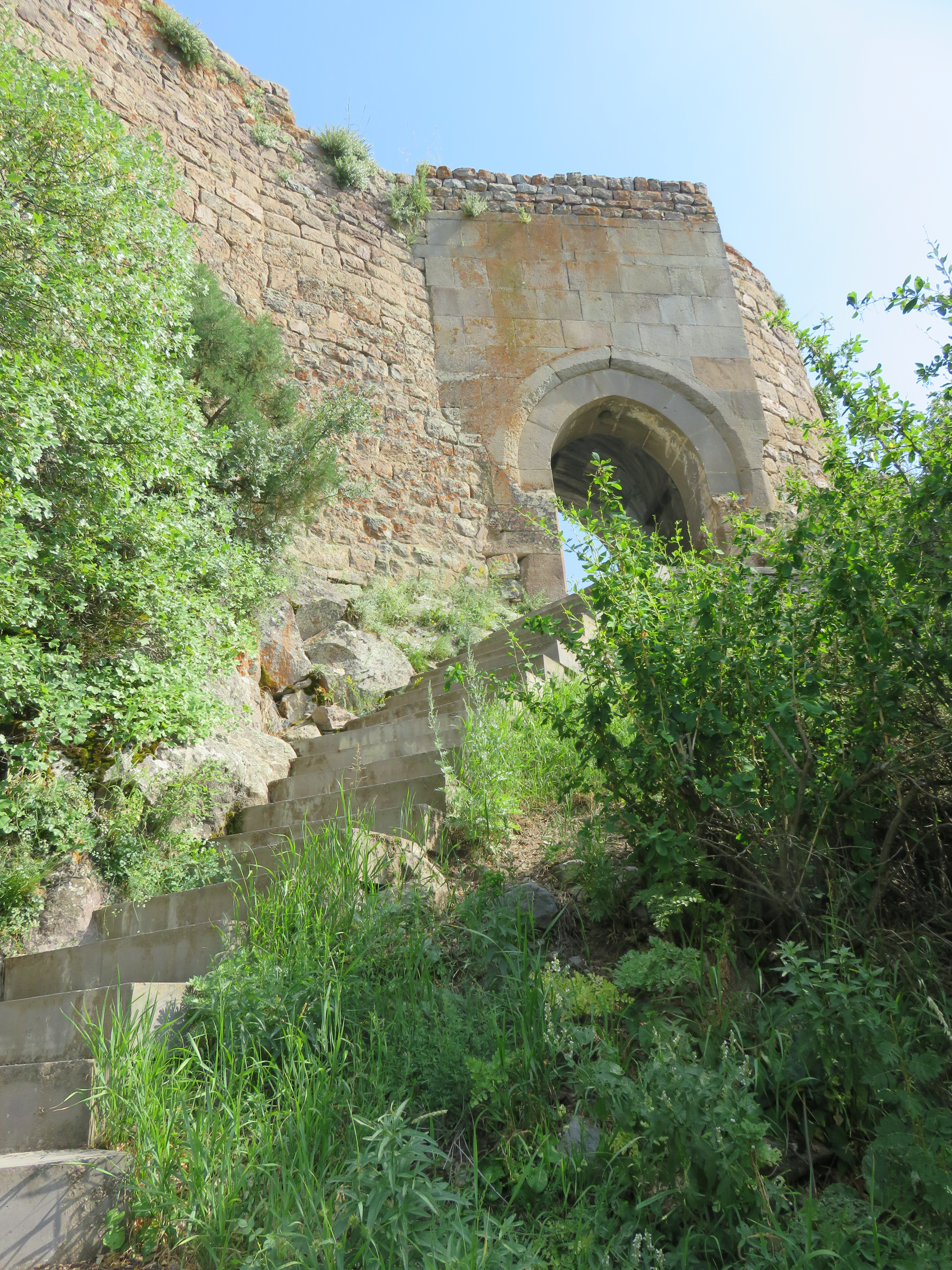
- Smbataberd

- Location within Armenia Location within Vayots Dzor
- Coordinates: 39°51′54″N 45°19′32″E
- Country: Armenia
- Province: Vayots Dzor
- Municipality: Yeghegis

Population (2011)
  - Total: 984
- Time zone: UTC+4 (AMT)

Artabuynk (Armenian: Արտաբույնք) is a village in the Yeghegis Municipality of the Vayots Dzor Province of Armenia. The Smbataberd fortress is located near the village.

== Etymology ==
The village was previously known as Yeghegis, Yekhegis, Alagyaz and Erdapin.

== Gallery ==
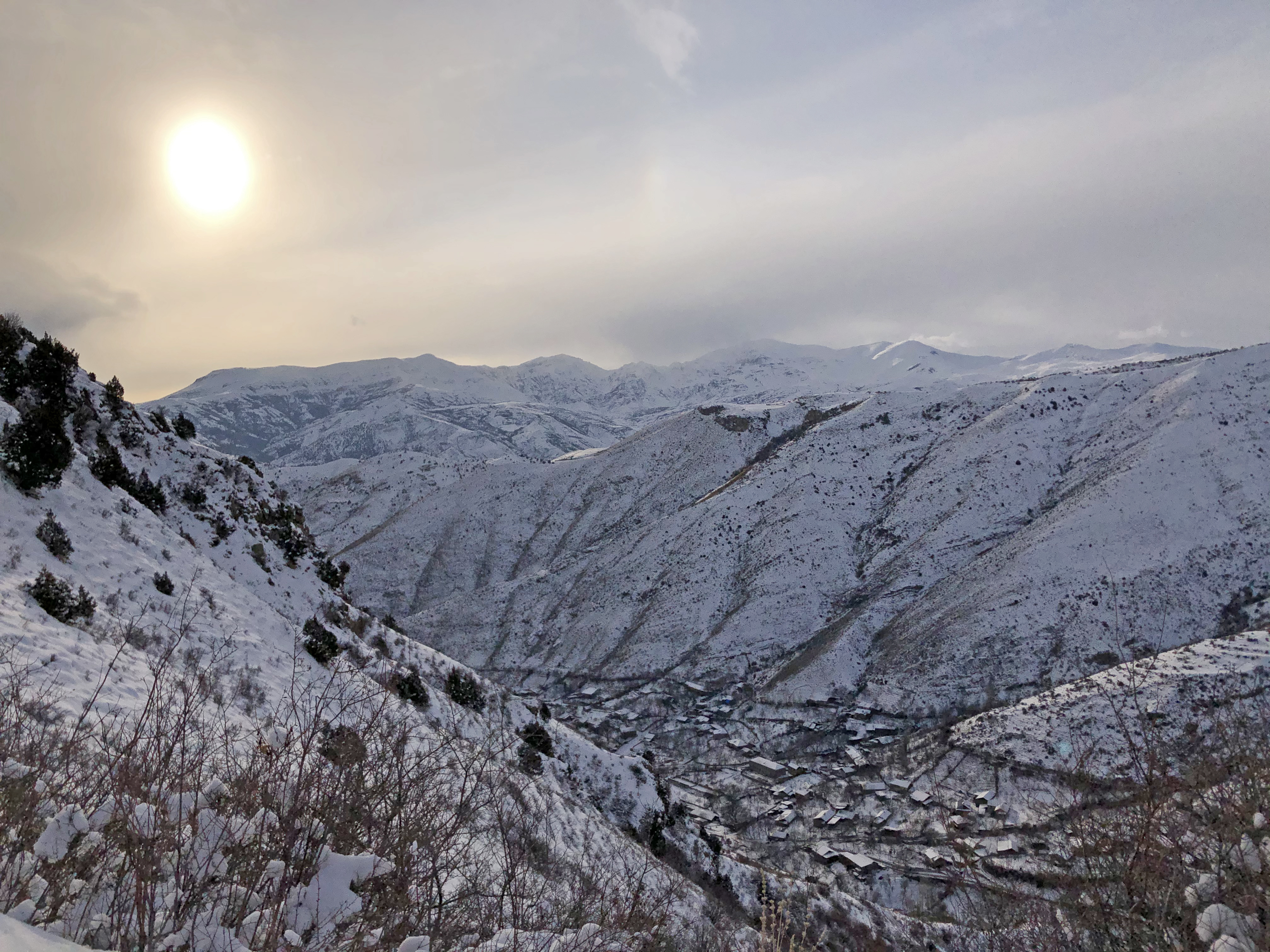
Smbatasar mountain

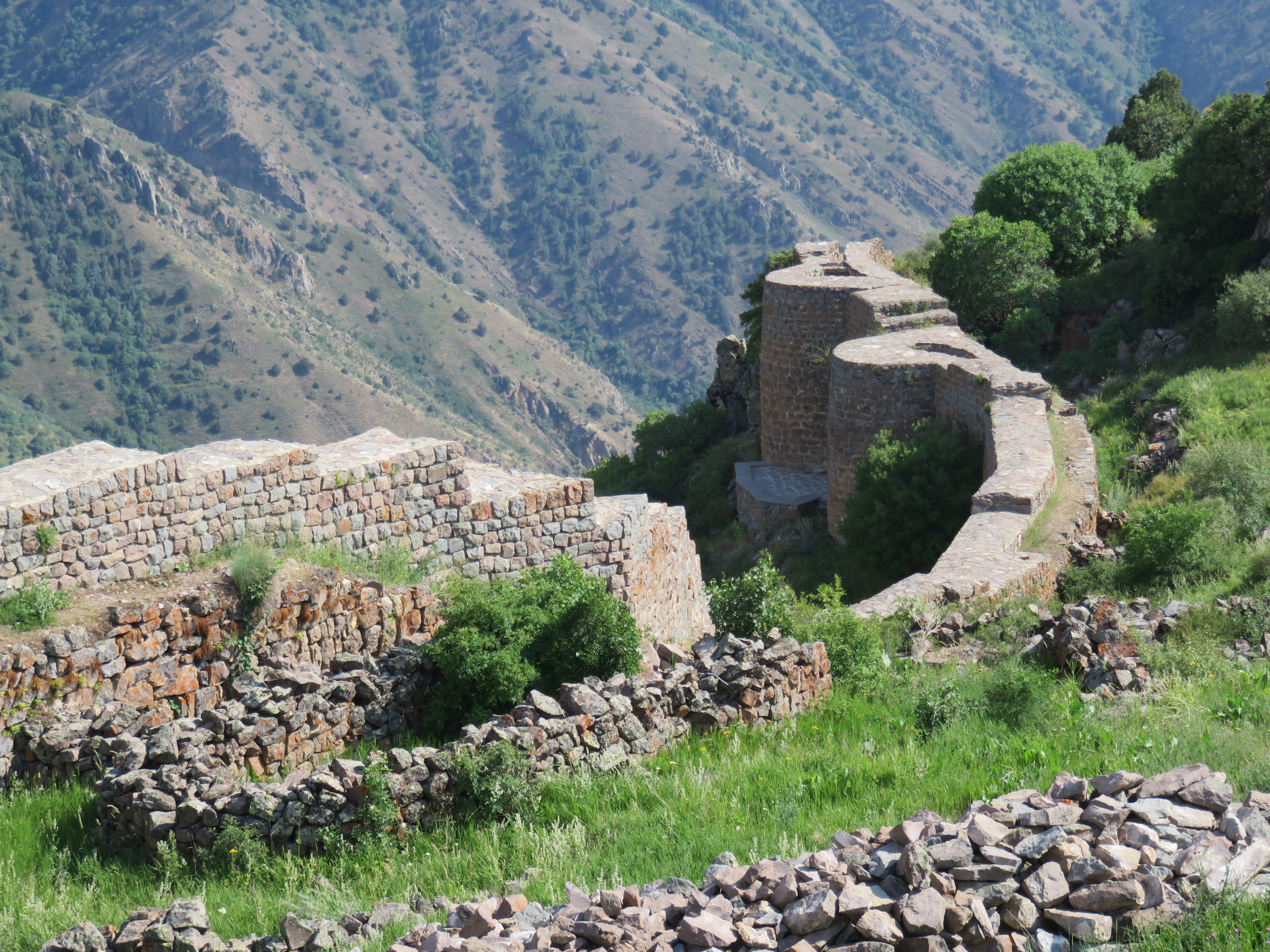
Smbataberd

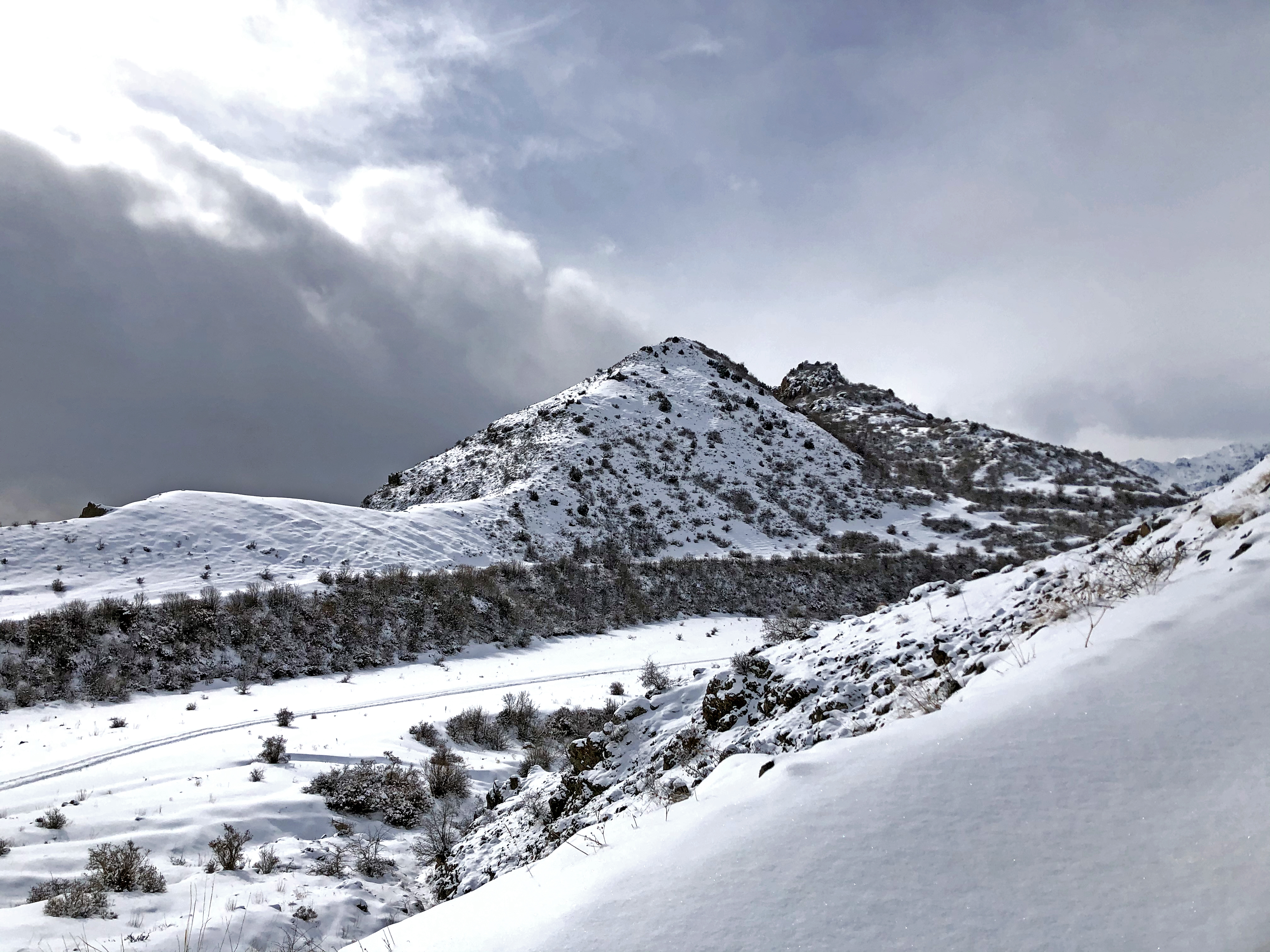
Smbatasar mountain

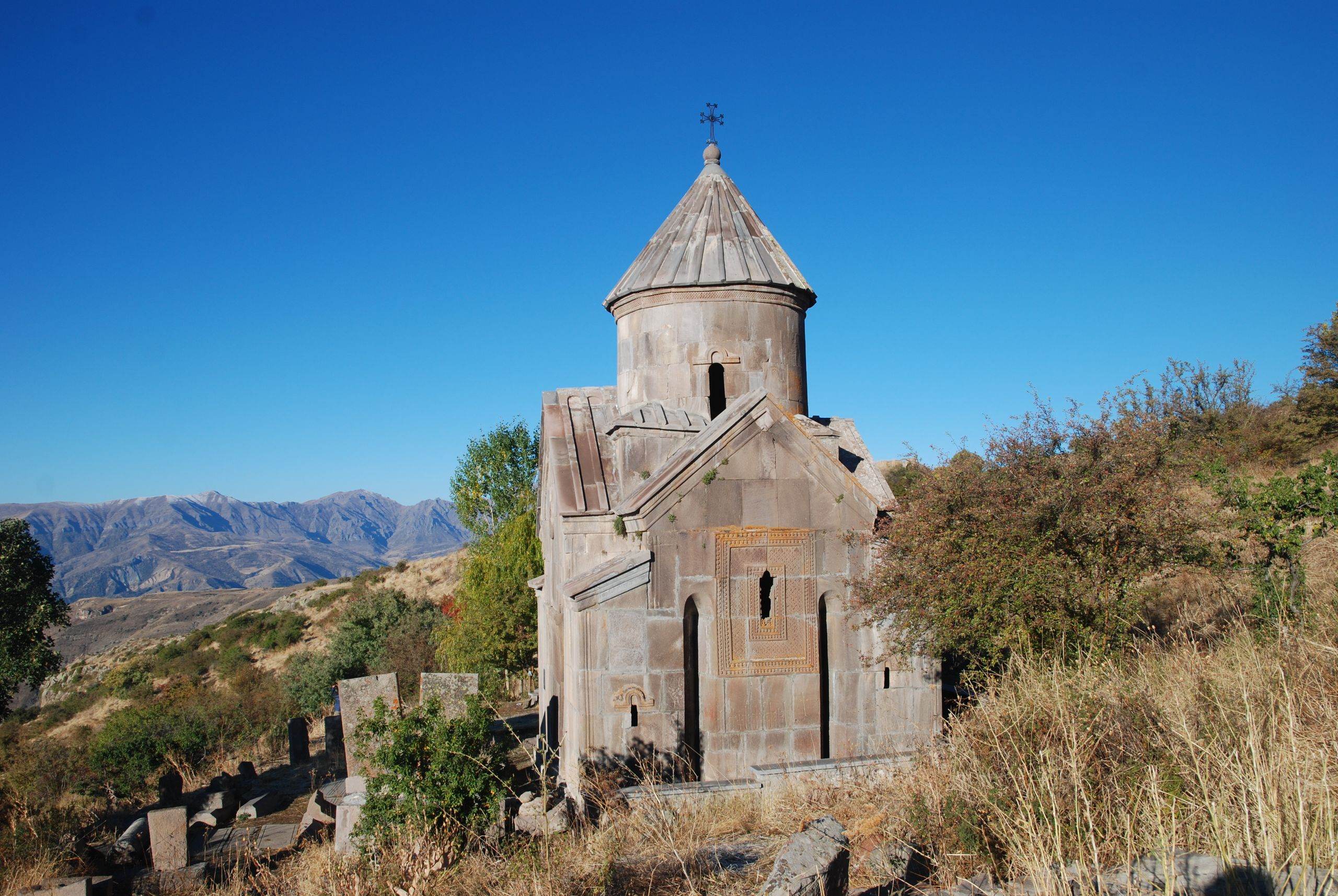
Tsaghats Kar Monastery, St. Karapet

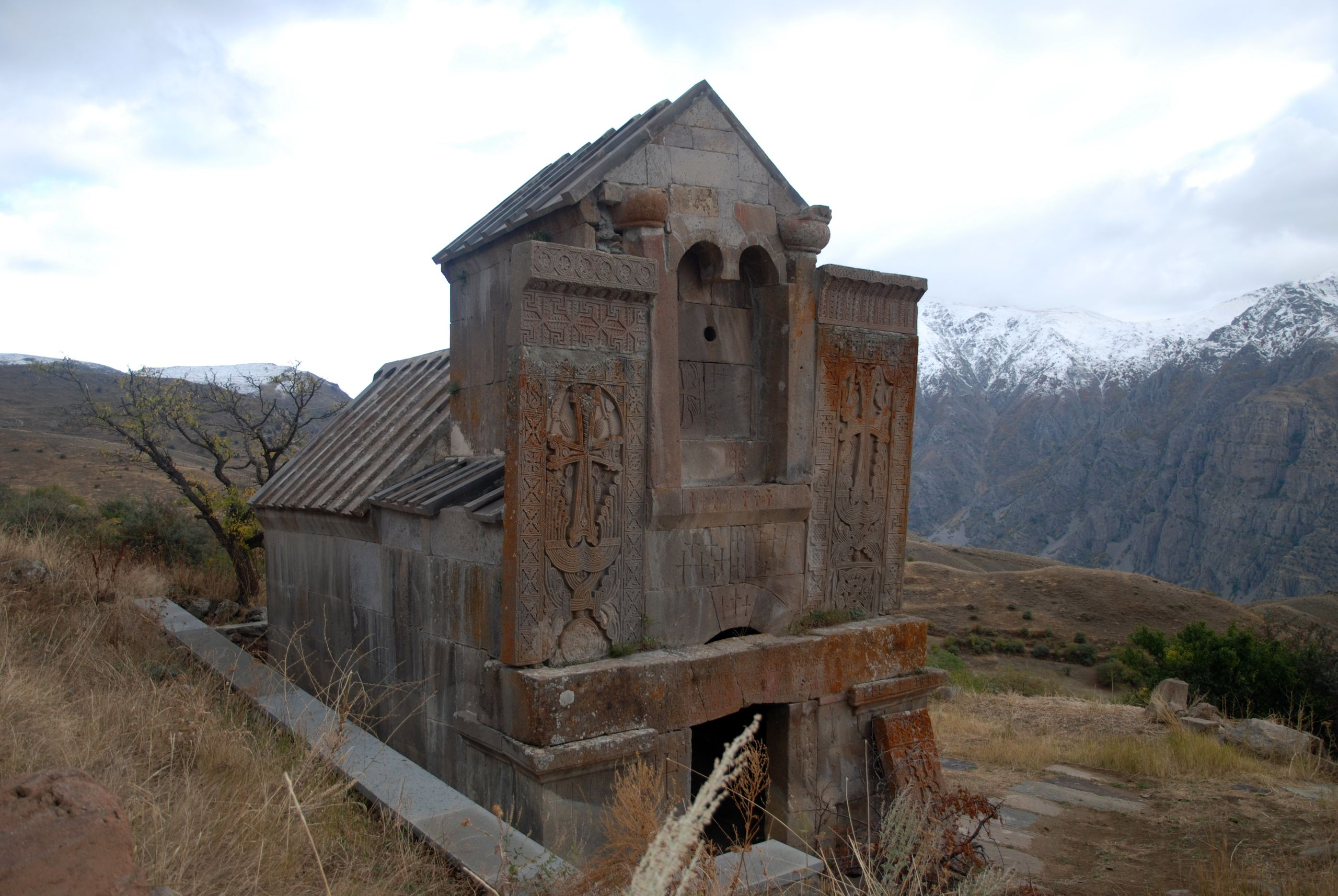
Tsaghats Kar Monastery, St. Surp Nshan

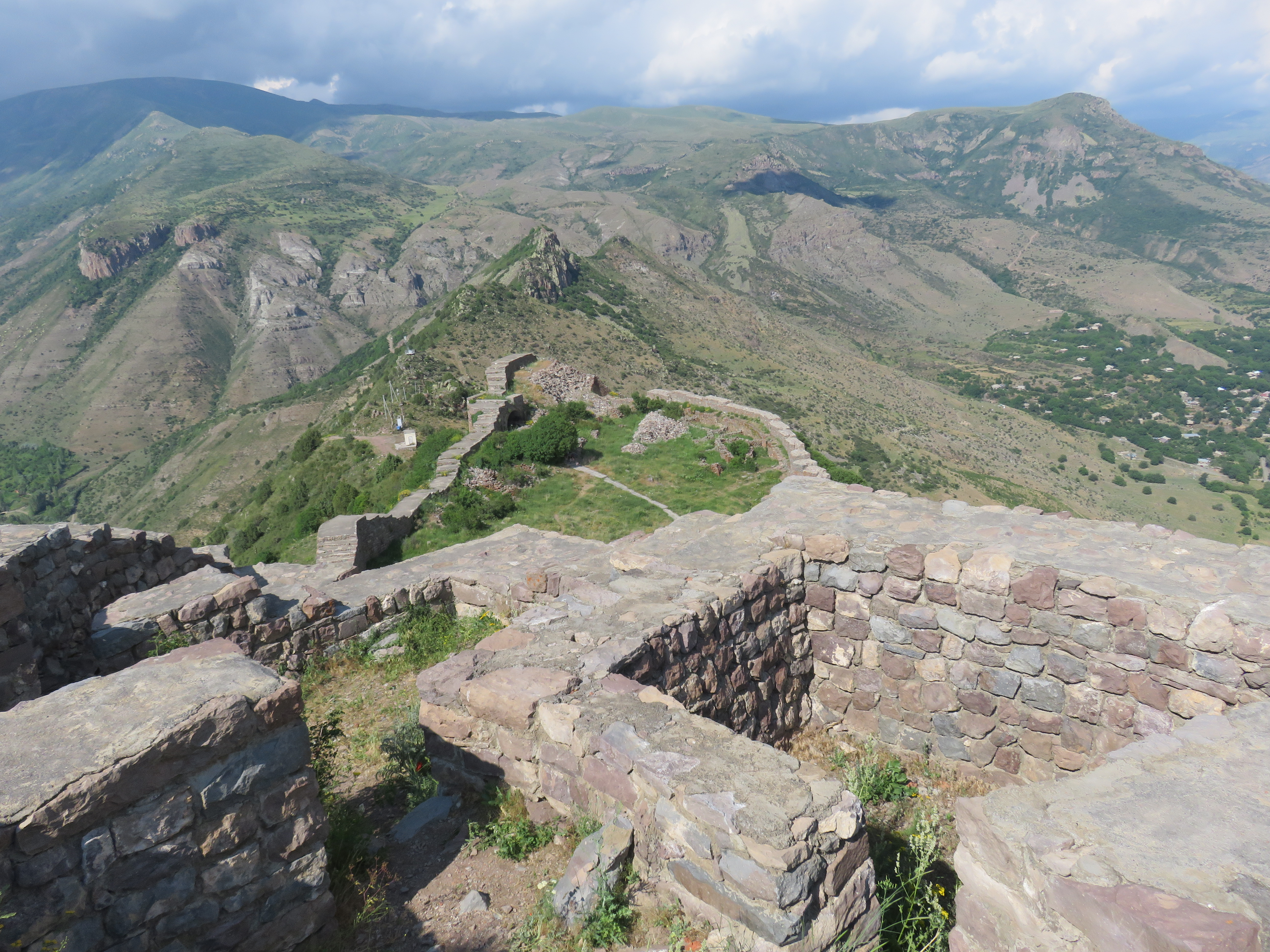
Smbataberd

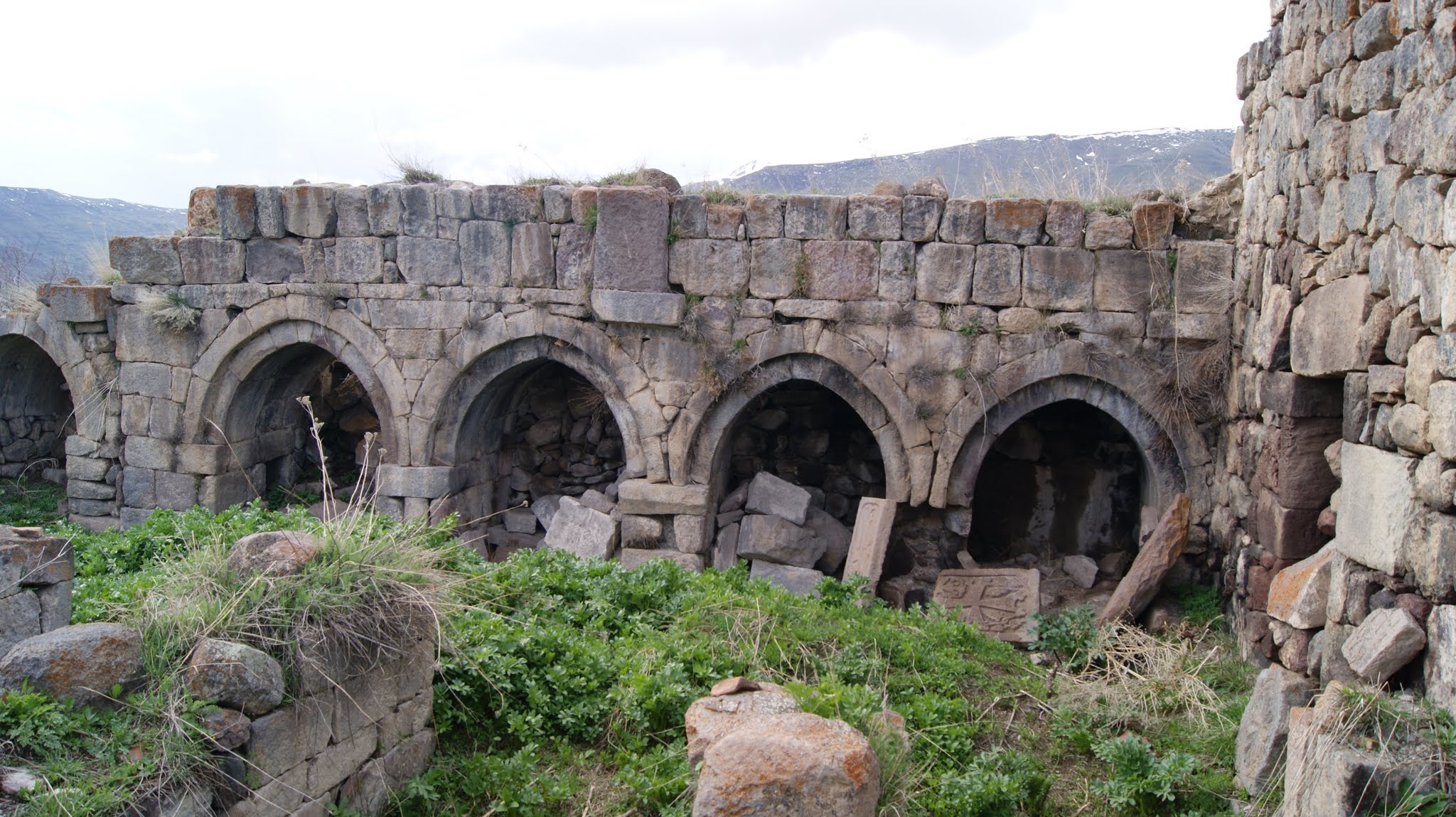
Tsaghats Kar monastic complex

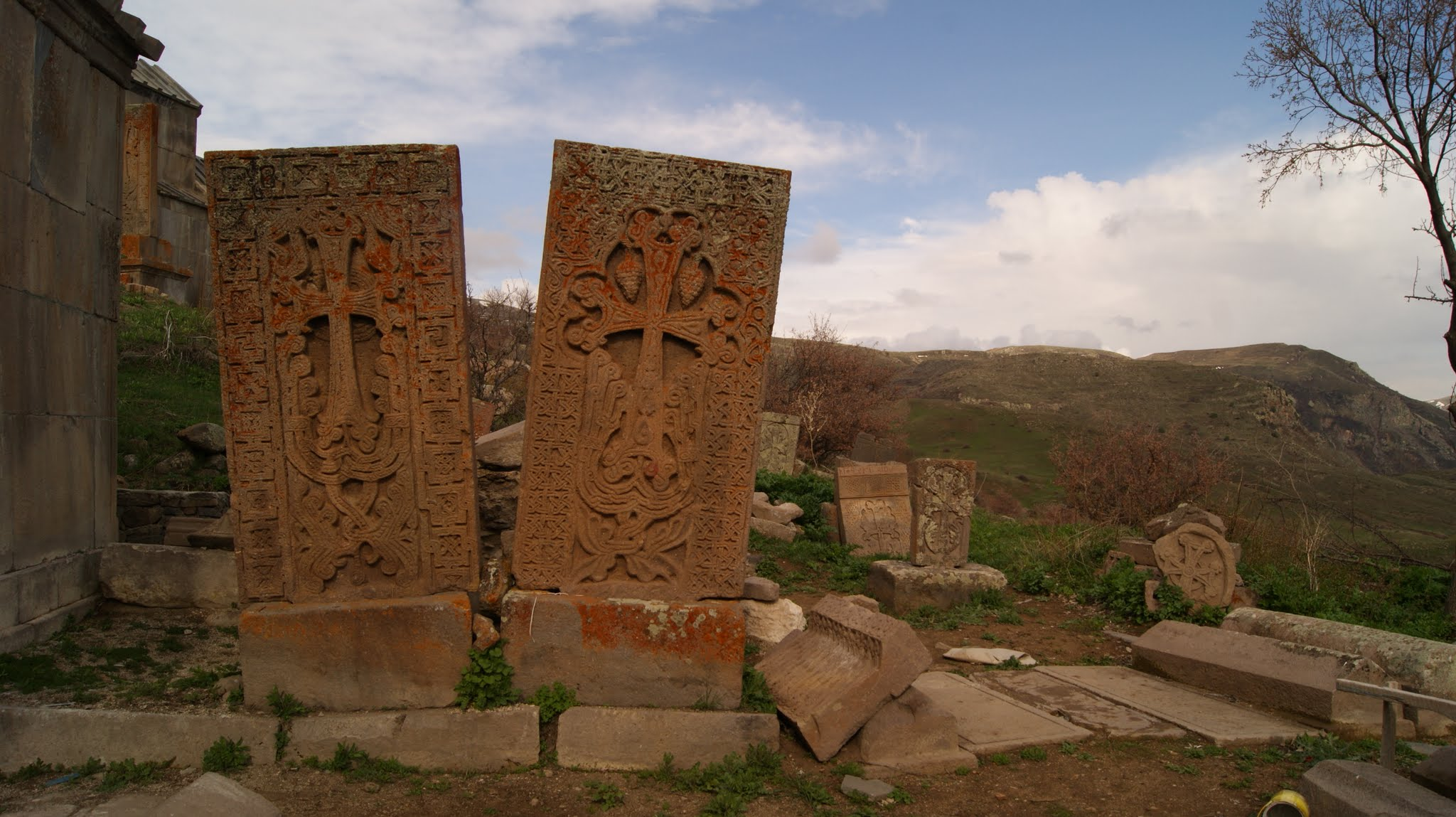
Khachkars in Tsaghats Kar
