= Alishan Bairamian =

- Born: Alishan Avedis Bairamian; December 24, 1914; Kilis, Ottoman Empire
- Died: March 14, 2004 (aged 89); Glendale, California
- Other names: Alichan Bairamian
- Citizenship: American
- Occupations: Intellectual, linguist, historian, author

Alishan Avedis Bairamian (Western Armenian: Ալիշան Պայրամեան, Eastern Armenian: Ալիշան Բայրամյան; December 24, 1914 – March 14, 2004) was an Armenian-American intellectual, linguist, historian, and author. Born in 1914 in Kilis, a part of historic Armenian Cilicia, he was a survivor of the Armenian genocide.

A repatriate to the Armenian Soviet Socialist Republic in 1946, he became a professor of French at Yerevan State Linguistic University and Yerevan State University. He was also a member of the National Academy of Sciences of Armenia's Institute of Oriental Studies, where he conducted research for his seminal work on the Sanjak of Alexandretta.

He was a regular contributor to Armenian newspapers including Nor Or, Nor Hayastan, Massis, and Asbarez. He also translated articles from American magazines on contemporary political issues.

== Biography ==
=== Early life and family ===
Alishan Avedis Bairamian was born in late 1914 to Avedis and Djemila Bairamian in the town of Kilis during the waning days of the Ottoman Empire. He had three brothers: Buzand, Hrant, and Hovsep.

Upon commencement of the genocide in 1915, the family was able to escape to Aleppo, Syria, where they stayed in a refugee camp.

After moving to Beirut, Bairamian met Sylvia Vertanessian, the daughter of Haroutioun and Arsenouhie Vertanessian, survivors of the 1922 Burning of Smyrna. They were married in 1943 and had four children: Keghanoush, Haroutioun, Tsovinar, and Avedik.

=== Soviet Armenia ===
==== Repatriation and reception ====
A nationalist and a communist, Bairamian moved to Soviet Armenia in 1946 after a call by Stalin to Diasporan Armenians to return to the homeland and was the leader of a caravan of repatriates from the Middle East.

Despite high hopes of becoming part of a prosperous and egalitarian Armenian nation, he was disheartened shortly after arriving by the perversion of socialist philosophy in the Soviet system. Also, like many of his compatriots, Bairamian experienced discrimination and persecution by both Soviet authorities and local Armenians, often being falsely suspected of being a foreign agent during the paranoia endemic throughout Stalin's reign. He was especially targeted by authorities for his outspoken views and for being a member of the Armenian intelligentsia, many times only narrowly averting expulsion to Siberia.

The distress he experienced as a repatriate in Soviet Armenia would remain with him for the rest of his life.

==== Teaching and scholarship ====
In Armenia, from 1946 to 1972, Bairamian served as a French professor at both Yerevan State Linguistic University and Yerevan State University. He would also teach Latin and English on occasion.

While teaching, he worked on his doctoral degree at the Institute of Oriental Studies. In 1969, he successfully defended his dissertation, written on the Sanjak of Alexandretta, in the Armenian language, in Yerevan, and was thus awarded a doctorate.

However, in the Soviet Union, doctoral candidates at the time were required to defend their dissertation in Russian, which he refused to do. Bairamian was thus denied recognition by Soviet authorities of his completion of the program requirements and the designation of doctor. Consequently, he was unable to practice as an academician of Oriental studies in Soviet Armenia. Decades later, while in America, he would publish his dissertation, with modifications, as a book.

At the National Academy of Sciences of Armenia, where he was a researcher, he befriended Nikolay Hovhannisyan. Hovhannisyan would become an esteemed Orientalist and would later write the preface to Bairamian's book on Kilis. (see Publications)

After decades of continued discrimination, Bairamian left Soviet Armenia with his family in 1972.

=== United States ===
Stopping for a short time in Grenoble, France, Bairamian moved his family to the United States, first living in San Francisco, then settling in Hollywood, California. He became a U.S. citizen in 1978.

He spent his later years writing and publishing his research. In addition to modifying and readying his dissertation on the Sanjak of Alexandretta for publication, he also wrote his most personal work during this time: a history of Armenians in his birthplace of Kilis. Both of these received positive critical receptions.

=== Death ===
Bairamian, who was working on a memoir, suffered a massive stroke on New Year's Day, 2004. He remained in a coma until he died on 14 March 2004. At the time of his death, he was survived by his wife, Sylvia, four children, and seven grandchildren.

== Politics ==
Though an avowed communist during his years in the Middle East, his repatriation to Soviet Armenia was a combination of his sense of Armenian nationalism and socialist convictions. Nevertheless, his traumatic experiences under Stalin's reign and the perverted socialist ideologies of the Soviet Union caused his estrangement from the Communist Party. He remained a lifelong socialist, believing in upholding the rights of oppressed and downtrodden peoples, but eschewed communism and the severe repressiveness of the Soviet Union.

In the United States, he maintained no official political affiliations but continued to care deeply about issues of Armenian national identity.

== Publications ==
His two main works were Aleksandreti Sanjaki Hartse yev Mijazgayin Divanakitutyun (1918-1939), about the issue of the Sanjak of Alexandretta, and Kiliza: Haykakan Kilis, about the Armenian history of Kilis from the Late Middle Ages to 1922.

He also authored textbooks on French and English, as well as several articles and essays on history and politics.
