= Ali the Fox =

Cartoon character

The five main characters from top to bottom, left to right: Mika, Shadow, Peach, Ali, and Bear

Ali the Fox (Chinese: 阿狸; pinyin: Ā-lí) is a cartoon character created by Xu Han (徐 瀚; Xú Hàn, also known as "Hans"), who graduated from the School of Fine Arts of Tsinghua University and received a master's degree. Ali is a red fox who wears white pants. The company controlling the character is Beijing Dream Castle Culture Co., Ltd (simplified Chinese: 北京梦之城文化有限公司; traditional Chinese: 北京夢之城文化有限公司; pinyin: Běijīng Mèng zhī Chéng Wénhuà Yǒuxiàngōngsī).

There is a film, titled “Ali. Dream Island” (simplified Chinese: 阿狸．梦之岛; traditional Chinese: 阿狸．夢之島; pinyin: Ā-lí Mèng zhī Dǎo).

== Characters ==
- Ali the Fox (阿狸; Ālí) - A male red fox.
- Peach (桃子; Táozi) - A female pink fox who is Ali's girlfriend. She wears a white dress with a heart on it and a bow on the back. She was also created by Hans after Ali was created.
- Bear (大熊; Dàxióng) - A male brown bear.
- Mika (米卡; Mǐkǎ) - A white rabbit.
- Shadow (影子; Yǐngzi) - A blue life form.
