= Alışanlı =

- Municipality
- Location within Azerbaijan
- Coordinates: 39°04′N 48°44′E
- Country: Azerbaijan
- Rayon: Masally

Population
  - Total: 875
- Time zone: UTC+4 (AZT)

Alışanlı (also, Alyshanly and Alishanly) is a village and municipality in the Masally Rayon of Azerbaijan. It has a population of 875.
