= Ali, Kazakhstan =

Ali Әли
- Village
- Location in Kazakhstan Ali (Asia)
- Coordinates: 43°33′51″N 77°1′49″E
- Country: Kazakhstan
- Region: Almaty Region
- District: Ile District, Kazakhstan

Population (2009)
  - Total: 1,270
- Time zone: UTC+6 (Omsk Time)

Ali (Kazakh: Әли, Äli) is a village in Almaty Region of south-eastern parts of Kazakhstan.
