= Tsaghats Kar Monastery =

Monastery in Vayots Dzor Province, Armenia

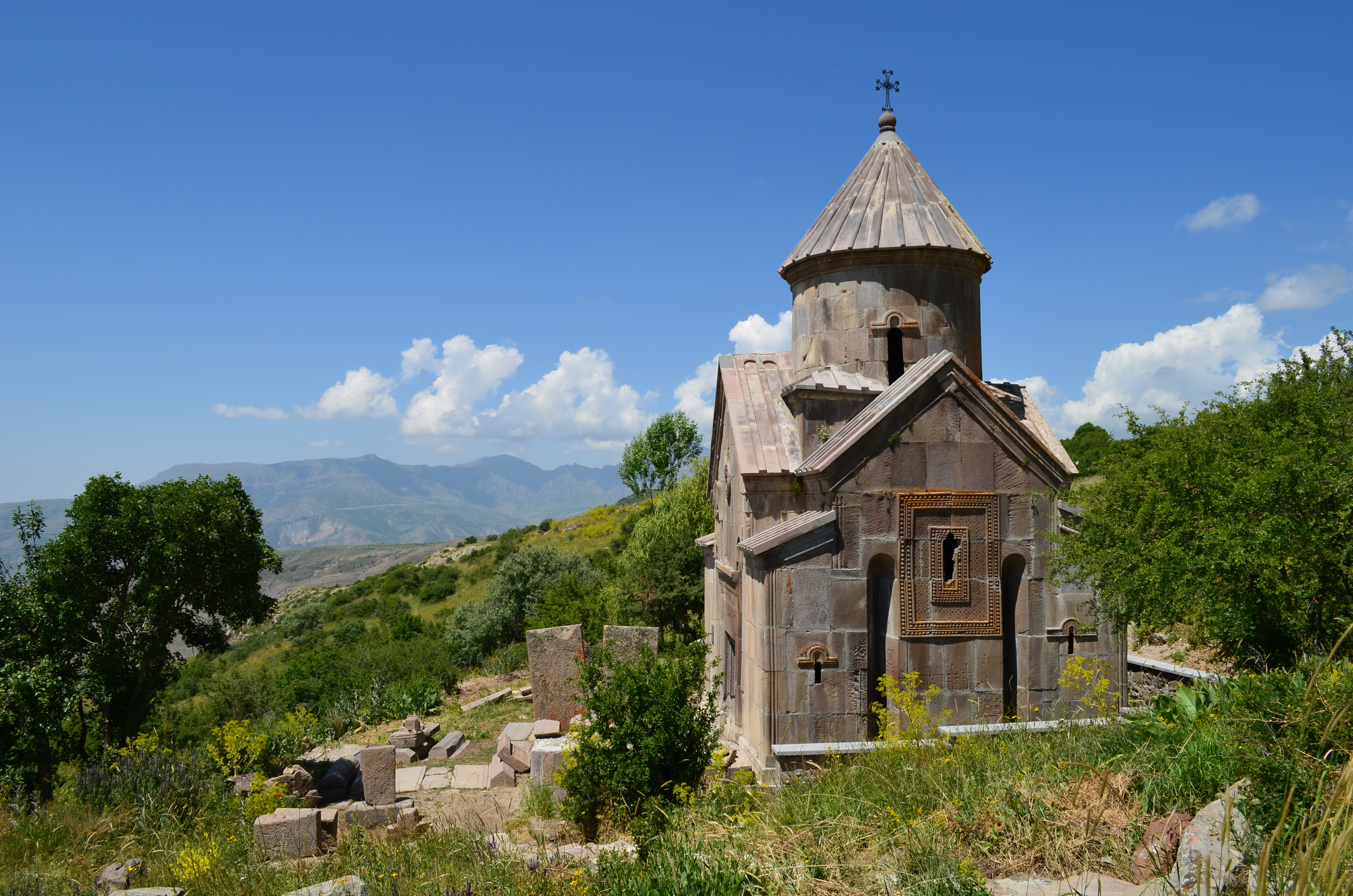
- Tsaghats Kar Monastery

- Location within Armenia Location within Vayots Dzor

Religion
- Affiliation: Armenian Apostolic Church

Location
- Location: Between the villages of Yeghegis and Horbategh, Vayots Dzor Province, Armenia
- Coordinates: 39.8950°N 45.3569°E

Architecture
- Style: Armenian
- Completed: 10th century Saint Hovhannes church c. 989; Saint Karapet church 10th century
- Dome: 1 still standing

Tsaghats Kar Monastery (Armenian: Ցաղաց քար վանք) is an Armenian monastery located along the mountain foothills overlooking the Yeghegis River, between the villages of Yeghegis (6 km northeast) and Horbategh in the Vayots Dzor Province of Armenia. The monastery is located within walking distance of the fortress of Smbataberd.

The church was built in the 10th century during the Bagratid kingdom. There is historical information about the construction of the church in the work of the historian Asoghik. Tsaghats kar was a medieval educational institution, they studied painting there, and there is a hypothesis that the choice of the name has something to do with the name of the flowered stone (Armenian Ծաղկած Քար or Ցաղաց Քար).

There are two groups of structures at the site that are separated by a distance of 200 meters (656 feet). The grouping to the west, now half-ruined, was constructed of rough-hewn basalt.

Within the complex of Tsaghats Kar is Surb Hovhannes church built in 989, Surb Karapet church of the 10th century, and many other structures that are in ruins. Saint Karapet is a cupola hall type structure, with a sacristy in each of the four corners. Numerous khachkars may be seen around the monastery as well.

There is a pipe-spring on the right a little after passing the river.

== Gallery ==
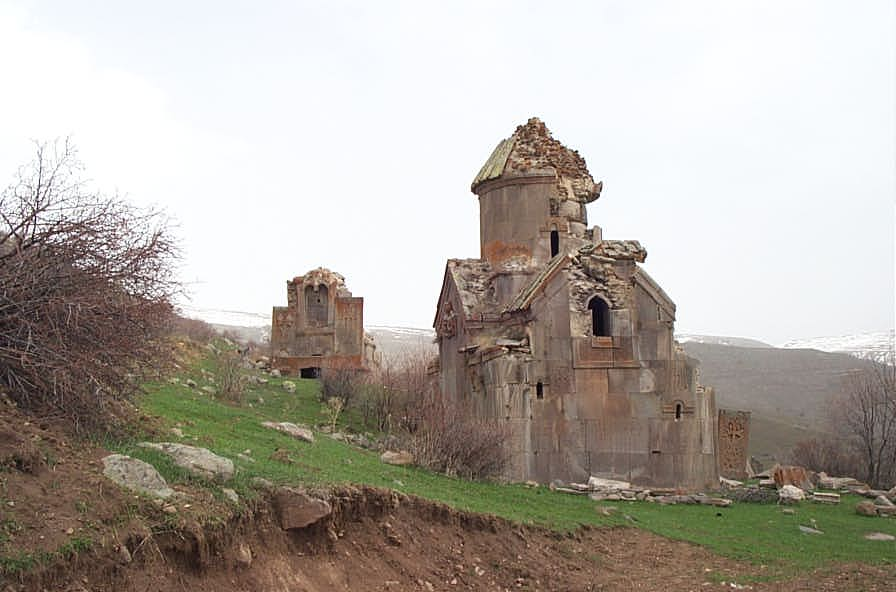
Another view of the complex prior to reconstruction.

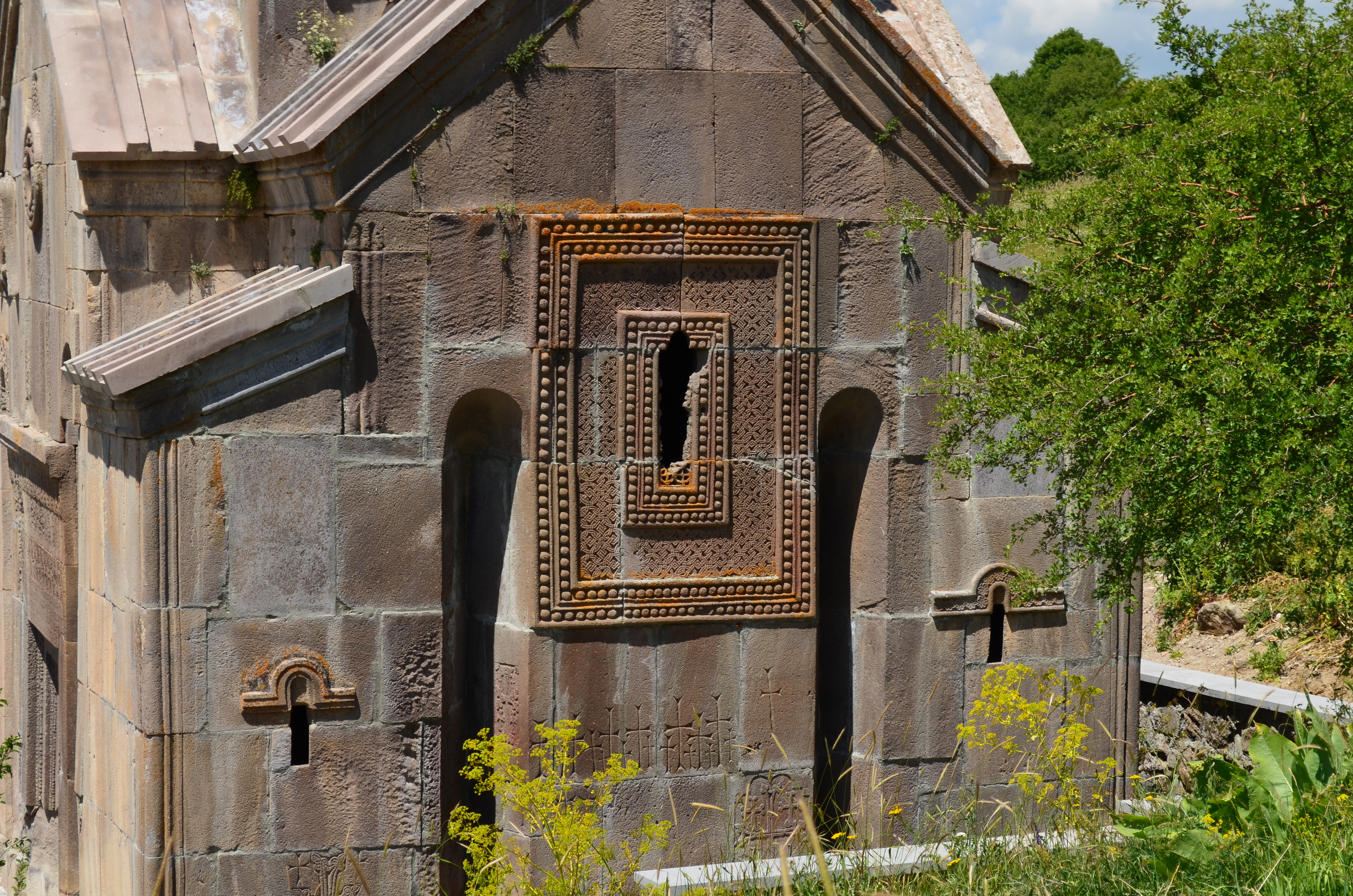

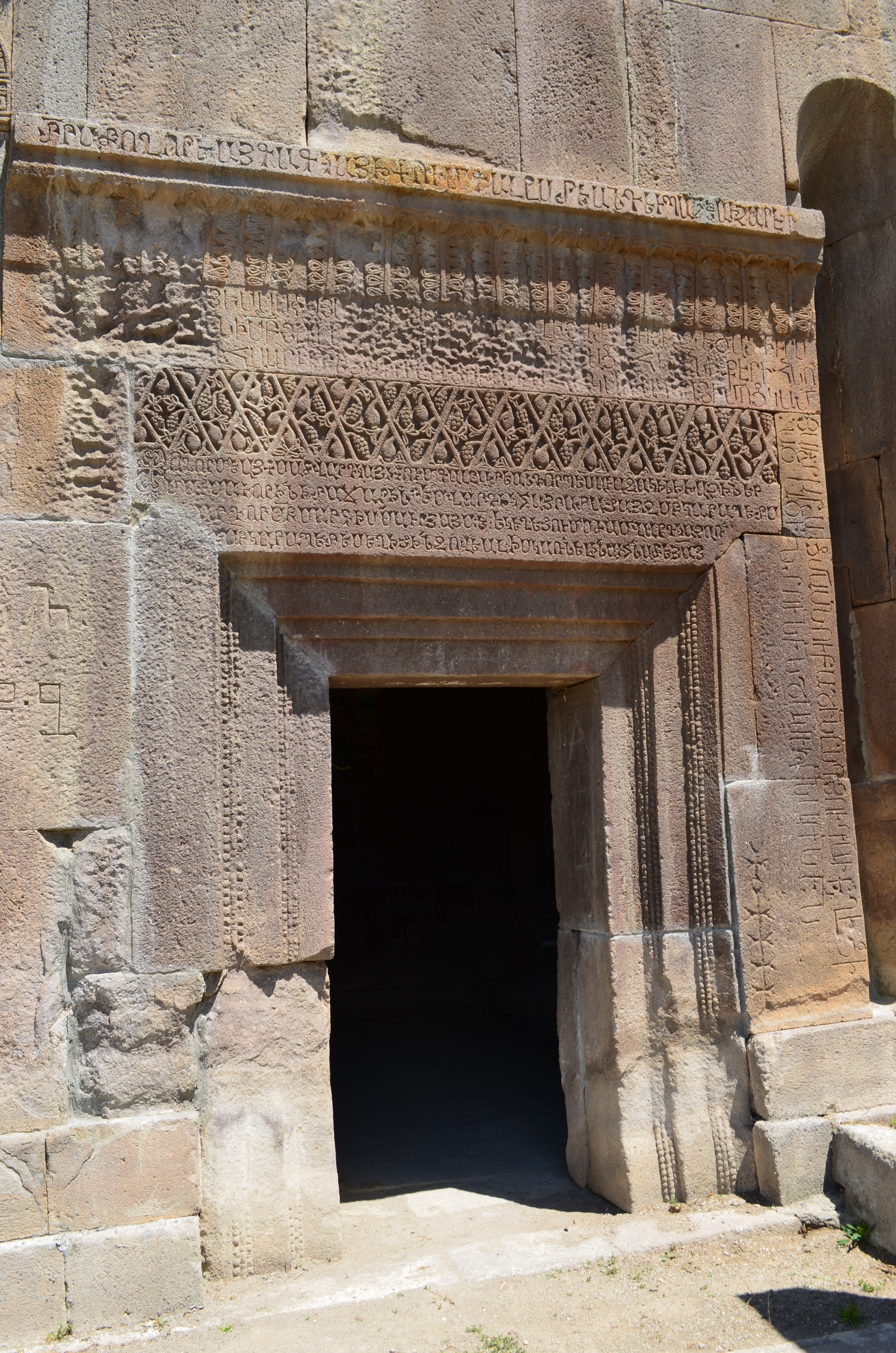
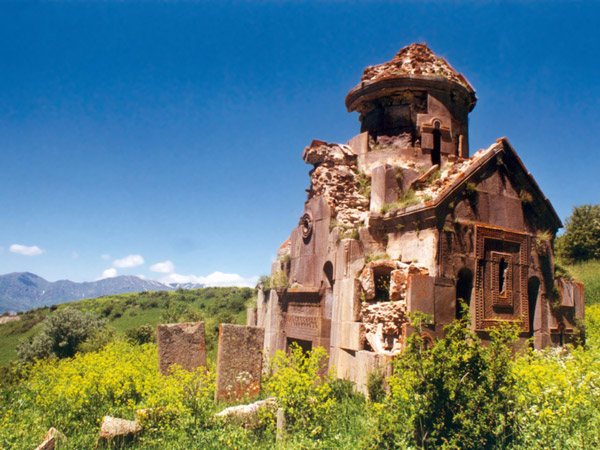
St. Karapet church of Tsaghats Kar monastery

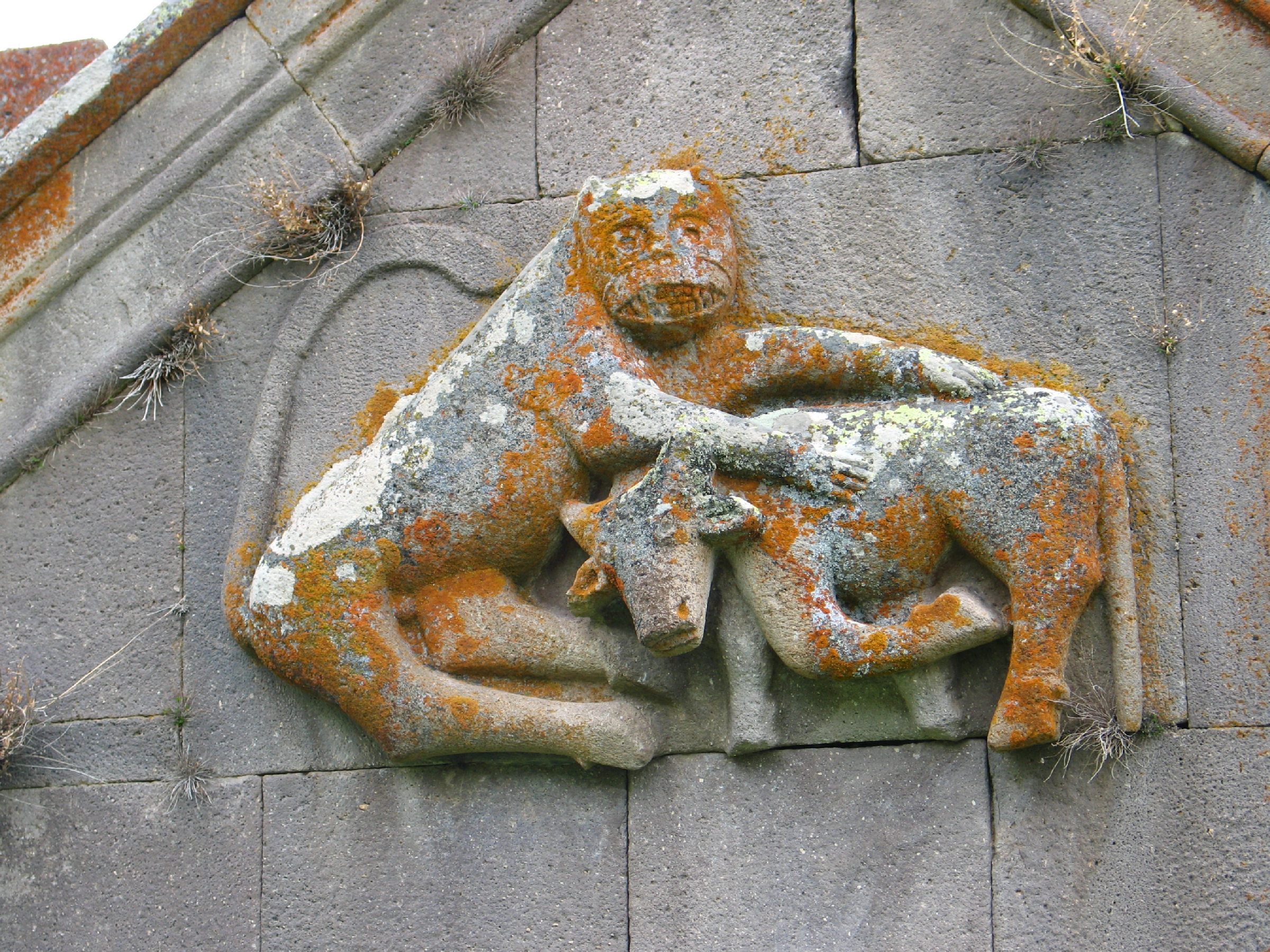
