= Leonardo Alishan =

Writer, scholar, translator

Leonardo Paul Alishan (1951–2005) was an Armenian-Iranian writer, scholar, and translator. He was a professor of Persian and Comparative Literature at the University of Utah from 1978-1997. His published works include three collections of poetry, a book of short stories, and many scholarly articles. His translations included works by Nima Yushij, Mehdi Akhavan-Sales, Jalal Al-e Ahmad, and Ahmad Shamlu who dedicated one of his poems to Alishan. He was a member of the Armenian Catholic Church

== Biography ==
Leonardo ("Nardo") Alishan was born to Michael Alishan and Annette Nazloomian in Tehran, Iran, on March 4, 1951. A descendant of the Armenian writer Ghevont Alishan (1820–1901), he developed an interest in literature at an early age. He earned a BA in English Language and Literature from Iran National University in 1973 after which, he immigrated to the United States. He then earned a Ph.D. in Comparative Literature from the University of Texas at Austin in 1978. He moved to Utah and joined the University of Utah's Middle Eastern Studies department in the same year.

He married Neli Assadourian on July 19, 1974. They had three children, Michael, Ara, and Eileen, and were divorced in 1993. He died in a house fire in Salt Lake City, Utah on January 8, 2005.

== Poetry collections ==
- Dancing Barefoot on Broken Glass, Ashod Press, 1991.
- Through a Dewdrop, Open Letter Press, 2000.
- Dead Man's Shadow: Collected Poems, Blind Owl Press, 2010.

== Short stories ==
- Free Fall: Collected Short Stories, Mazda Publishers, 2010.

== Awards ==
- Academy of American Poets Award
- Christopher Morely Poetry Award
- Irving Writing Award
- Atlanta Review International Merit Award
