= Nor Hayastan =

Armenian language newspaper in Glendale, California

- Type: Four times a week newspaper
- Owner(s): Vahan Vahanian (Jansezian)
- Editor: Vahan Vahanian
- Founded: 15 January 1992
- Language: Armenian (classical orthography)
- Headquarters: 815 S. Central Ave., #31, Glendale, CA 91204

Nor Hayastan (Armenian: Նոր Հայաստան, meaning "New Armenia") is an independent Armenian language daily newspaper published in Glendale, California. It was established by Vahan Vahanian (Jansezian).

The first issue was published on January 15, 1992.

The newspaper's frequency varies, but is usually on a daily basis from Tuesday to Friday averaging 12 to 16 pages a day in a tabloid size. It publishes a mixture of articles in both Eastern Armenian and Western Armenian, but using in both cases the Traditional Armenian (Mashdotsian) orthography. Although all the news materials are in Armenian, the ads may run in both Armenian and English.

Using the slogan "Everyone's daily" (in Armenian Ամէնուն օրաթերթը), and claiming on its masthead "New Armenia - The Only Armenian Independent Daily), it remains largely non-partisan and does not claim allegiance to any one political party in Armenia or the Armenian diaspora.

The daily is distributed free of charge and publishes an average of 8,000 copies a day.

== See also ==
- Armenian American media
