= Qaleh-ye Ali, Shesh Pir =

Qaleh-ye Ali قلعه عالي
- Village
- Location within Iran
- Coordinates: 30°08′42″N 52°12′33″E
- Country: Iran
- Province: Fars
- County: Sepidan
- Bakhsh: Hamaijan
- Rural District: Shesh Pir

Population (2006)
  - Total: 58
- Time zone: UTC+3:30 (IRST)
  - Summer (DST): UTC+4:30 (IRDT)

Qaleh-ye Ali (Persian: قلعه عالي, also Romanized as Qal‘eh-ye 'Ālī and Qal‘eh-ye 'Alī; also known as 'Ālī) is a village in Shesh Pir Rural District, Hamaijan District, Sepidan County, Fars province, Iran. At the 2006 census, its population was 58, in 12 families.
