= Ali, Khuzestan =

Ali عالي
- Village
- Location within Iran
- Coordinates: 31°52′46″N 49°59′57″E
- Country: Iran
- Province: Khuzestan
- County: Izeh
- Bakhsh: Central
- Rural District: Howmeh-ye Sharqi

Population (2006)
  - Total: 79
- Time zone: UTC+3:30 (IRST)
  - Summer (DST): UTC+4:30 (IRDT)

Ali (Persian: عالي, also Romanized as ‘Ālī) is a village in Howmeh-ye Sharqi Rural District, in the Central District of Izeh County, Khuzestan Province, Iran. At the 2006 census, its population was 79, in 11 families.
