= Allee =

Allee is a given name and surname. Notable people with the name include:

== Given name ==
- Allee Willis (1947–2019), American songwriter

== Surname ==
- Alfred Allee aka Alfred Y. Allee (1855–1896), American sheriff
- Alfred Young Allee (1905–1987), American sheriff
- Charles Allee (1848-1896, Australian cricketer
- David Allee (born 1969), American photographer
- J. Frank Allee (1857–1938), American merchant and politician
- Marjorie Hill Allee (1890–1945), American author
- Verna Allee (born 1949), American business consultant
- Warder Clyde Allee (1885–1955), American ecologist, discoverer of the Allee effect
- William Allee (1852–1916), American politician, Missouri senator

== Ecology ==
- Allee effect discovered by and named for Warder Clyde Allee

== See also ==
- Ally (name), given name and surname
- Allie, given name and surname
