= Allie =

- Pronunciation: /ˈæli/
- Gender: Unisex
- Language: English

Origin
- Languages: English and other languages
- Origin: Diminutive form of several names beginning with Al-
- Region of origin: English-speaking world

Other names
- Variant forms: Alli; Ali; Ally; Alley; Aly; Allee
- Related names: Alison, Allison, Allyson, Alexandra, Alex, Alanna, Alan, Albert, Alexander

Allie is a unisex given name, a nickname and, more rarely a surname. It is a diminutive form of several names beginning with Al-. It may refer to:

== Given name or nickname ==
=== Female ===
- Allie (wrestler) (born 1987), Canadian professional wrestler
- Allie Bailey (born 1993), American soccer player
- Allie Bates (born 1957), American short story writer
- Allie Brosh (born 1985), American blogger
- Allie May Carpenter (1887–1978), American artist
- Allie Lewis Clapp, American television host
- Allie Clifton (born 1988), American journalist
- Allie DeBerry (born 1994), American actress and model
- Allie Luse Dick (1859–1933), American music teacher
- Allie DiMeco (born 1992), American actress and musician
- Allie Vibert Douglas (1894–1988), Canadian astronomer and first Canadian woman astrophysicist
- Allie Eagle (1949–2022), New Zealand artist
- Alvira "Allie" Earp, common-law wife of Virgil Earp (1843–1905), American Old West lawman
- Allie Esiri (born 1967), British writer
- Allie Goertz (born 1991), American singer-songwriter and comedian
- Allie Goodbun, Canadian dancer, actress, and showgirl
- Allie Gonino (born 1989 or 1990), American actress
- Allie Grant (born 1994), American actress
- Allie Hann-McCurdy (born 1987), Canadian ice dancer
- Allie Hixson (1924–2007), American feminist
- Allie Kieffer (born 1987), American athlete
- Allie Kiick (born 1995), American tennis player
- Allie LaForce (born 1988), American journalist
- Allie B. Latimer (born 1929), first woman and first African-American to serve as General Counsel of a major United States federal agency
- Allie Legg (born 1989), American cyclist
- Allie Light, American film producer
- Allie Long (born 1987), American soccer player
- Allie MacDonald (born 1988), Canadian actress
- Allie Beth Martin (1914–1976), American librarian, educator, politician and author
- Allie Moss, American songwriter
- Allie Munroe (born 1997), Canadian ice hockey player
- Allie Ostrander (born 1996), American long-distance runner
- Allie Quigley (born 1986), American–Hungarian Women's National Basketball Association player
- Allie Rowbottom (born 1986), American writer
- Allie Beth Stuckey (born 1992), American blogger
- Allie Tennant (1892–1971), American sculptor
- Allie Thunstrom (born 1988), American speed skater and former ice hockey player
- Allie Trimm (born 1994), American actress
- Allie Will (born 1991), American tennis player
- Allie Wilson (born 1996), American middle-distance runner
- Allie X (born 1985), Canadian singer-songwriter
- Allie Ziebell (born 2005), American basketball player

=== Male ===
- Allie Clark (1923–2012), American Major League Baseball player
- Allie Craycraft (born 1932), American former politician
- Allie Ray Hull (1915–2006), American politician
- Allie Lampard (1885–1984), Australian cricketer
- Allie McGuire (born 1951), American former basketball player
- Allie McGhee (born 1941), African-American artist
- Allie McNab, Jamaican football manager and former player
- Allie Miller (1886–1959), American college football player and head coach
- Allie Morrison (1904–1966), American freestyle wrestler, 1928 Olympic gold medalist and national champion
- Allie Moulton (1886–1968), American baseball player
- Allie Paine (1919–2008), American basketball player
- Allie Reynolds (1917–1994), American Major League Baseball pitcher
- Allie Sherman (1923–2015), American former National Football League player and head coach
- Allie Edward Stakes Stephens (1900–1973), American politician
- Allie Strobel (1884–1955), American Major League Baseball player
- Allie Watt (1899–1968), American baseball player
- Allie White (1915–1996), American football player
- Allie Wrubel (1905–1973), American composer and songwriter

== Fictional characters ==
- Allie Caulfield, Holden Caulfield's dead brother in the novel The Catcher in the Rye by J.D. Salinger
- Allie Fox, from the book The Mosquito Coast and its movie adaptation
- Allison "Allie" Hamilton, from the novel The Notebook and its movie adaptation
- Allie Keys, in the science fiction miniseries Taken, played by Dakota Fanning
- Allison "Allie" Lowell, one of the lead characters in the American TV series Kate & Allie
- Allie Novak, from the Australian drama series Wentworth
- Ahalya "Allie" Rajan, in the television series CSI: Vegas
- Allie Renkins, from the animated PBS series Curious George

== Surname ==
- Charles Allie (born 1947), American masters athletics sprinter
- Gair Allie (1931–2016), American Major League Baseball player in 1954
- Nazeer Allie (born 1985), South African footballer
- Scott Allie, American comics writer and editor, editor-in-chief of Dark Horse Comics from 2012 to 2015

== See also ==
- Alphonse Malangone (born 1936), New York City mobster nicknamed "Allie Shades"
