= Allies (disambiguation) =

Allies is a term referring to individuals, groups or nations that have joined together in an association for mutual benefit or to achieve some common purpose.

Allies may also refer to:

- Allies of World War I
- Allies of World War II
- French and British forces in the Crimean War
- Straight allies, people who identify as heterosexual and who support equal civil rights for the LBGTQ community
- Allies (band), a popular 1980s era Contemporary Christian music group featuring Bob Carlisle
- Allies (Crosby, Stills & Nash album), 1983
- Allies (Fred Frith album), 1996
- "Allies" (Stargate Atlantis), a Stargate Atlantis episode
- "Allies" (song), the sixth track on the album Passionworks by Heart
- Allies (Australian rules football), a representative Australian rules football team
- Allies (Champions), a 1993 supplement for the role-playing game Champions
- Allies (film), a 2014 British war film
- Allies, a 2010 Star Wars novel in the Fate of the Jedi series
- Allies (novel), a 2019 novel by Alan Gratz

== See also ==
- Allies (surname)
- Allie (disambiguation)
- Allied (disambiguation)
- Ally (disambiguation)
- Allied Forces (disambiguation)
- Allied Powers (disambiguation)
- Alley
