= Allied (disambiguation) =

Allied means joined in a military, political or business alliance.

Allied may also refer to:

- Allied (automobile), a car (made 1932–1935)
- Allied Stores, an American retailer (1930s–1992)
- Allied Carpets, a British retailer (1950s–2015)
- Allied Commission, one of the post-WWII governance bodies
- Allied (film), a 2016 romantic war thriller

== See also ==
- Allie (disambiguation)
- Ally (disambiguation)
- Allied Forces (disambiguation)
- Allied Powers (disambiguation)
- Allies (disambiguation)
