= Business ecosystem =

Network of interconnected organizations

A business ecosystem is a network of interconnected organizations—including suppliers, distributors, customers, competitors, and other stakeholders—that collaborate and compete to deliver products and services to the market. A business ecosystem is a purposeful business arrangement between two or more entities (the members) to create and share in collective value for a common set of customers.

The concept was pioneered by James F. Moore, who introduced the strategic planning framework in the early 1990s. The business ecosystem concept has become widely adopted across industries, particularly in high tech, as organizations increasingly recognize that competitive advantage comes not from individual company performance alone, but from the collective strength and coordination of entire ecosystems. These business ecosystems are dynamic networks of entities interacting with each other to create and exchange sustainable value for participants. Modern applications include platform strategies, digital marketplaces, and collaborative innovation networks that span multiple industries and geographic regions.

== The origins of the concept ==
The concept first appeared in Moore's May/June 1993 Harvard Business Review article, titled "Predators and Prey: A New Ecology of Competition", and won the McKinsey Award for article of the year.

Moore later expanded on this concept in his influential 1996 book, The Death of Competition: Leadership and Strategy in the Age of Business Ecosystems. He defined the concept as:

An economic community supported by a foundation of interacting organizations and individuals—the organisms of the business world. The economic community produces goods and services of value to customers, who are themselves members of the ecosystem. The member organisms also include suppliers, lead producers, competitors, and other stakeholders. Over time, they coevolve their capabilities and roles, and tend to align themselves with the directions set by one or more central companies. Those companies holding leadership roles may change over time, but the function of ecosystem leader is valued by the community because it enables members to move toward shared visions to align their investments, and to find mutually supportive roles.

Moore used several ecological metaphors, suggesting that the firm is embedded in a (business) environment, that it needs to coevolve with other companies, and that “the particular niche a business occupies is challenged by newly arriving species.” This meant that companies need to become proactive in developing mutually beneficial ("symbiotic") relationships with customers, suppliers, and even competitors.

Using ecological metaphors to describe business structure and operations is increasingly common especially within the field of information technology (IT). For example, J. Bradford DeLong, a professor of economics at the University of California, Berkeley, has written that "business ecosystems" describe “the pattern of launching new technologies that has emerged from Silicon Valley”. He defines business ecology as “a more productive set of processes for developing and commercializing new technologies” that is characterized by the “rapid prototyping, short product-development cycles, early test marketing, options-based compensation, venture funding, early corporate independence”. DeLong also has expressed that the new way is likely to endure “because it's a better business ecology than the legendarily lugubrious model refined at Xerox Parc—a more productive set of processes for rapidly developing and commercializing new technologies”.

Mangrove Software, The Montague Institute, and Stephen Abram, Vice President of Micromedia, Ltd., Tom Gruber, co-founder and CTO of Intraspect Software, Vinod K. Dar, Managing Director of Dar & Company, have all advocated this approach.

== Industries ==
Gruber explains that over a century ago, Ford Motors did well using methods of mass production, an assembly line, and insourcing. However, Ford began to outsource its production “[w]hen the ecology evolved.” Gruber (n.d.) has stated that such evolution in the ecology of the business world is “punctuated now and then by radical changes in the environment” and that “globalization and the Internet are the equivalents of large-scale climate change. Globalization is eliminating the traditional advantages of the large corporation: access to capital, access to markets, and economies of scale”.

The application service provider (ASP) industry is moving toward relationship networks and focusing on core competencies. “According to the gospel of Cisco Systems, companies inclined to exist together within an “ecosystem” facilitate the imminence of Internet-based application delivery”.

Books also use natural systems metaphors without discussing the interfaces between human business and biological ecosystems.

Another work defines business ecology as “a new field for sustainable organizational management and design,” one “that is based on the principle that organizations, as living organisms, are most successful when their development and behavior are aligned with their core purpose and values – what we call “social DNA’”.

The need for companies to attend to ecological health is indicated by the following: “Business ecology is based on the elegant structure and principles of natural systems. It recognizes that to develop healthy business ecosystems, leaders and their organizations must see themselves, and their environments, through an “ecological lens”.

== Biological ecosystems ==
The concept ecosystem in economy and business stems from the ecosystem concept in ecology. Some environmentalists, however, have used "business ecosystems" as a way to talk about environmental issues as they relate to business rather than as a metaphor to describe the increasing complexity of relationships among companies. According to Townsend, business ecology is the study of the reciprocal relationship between business and organisms and their environments. The goal of this "business ecology" is sustainability through the complete ecological synchronization and integration of a business with the sites that it inhabits, uses, and affects.

Other environmentalists believe that the ecosystem metaphor is just a way for business to appear 'Green' and natural. According to author Alan Marshall, for example, the metaphor is used to make out that somehow business operates using natural principles which should be left to run without interference by governments.

In the PESTEL-framework, ecology or environment is one of the criteria to analyse the external circumstances of a company.

== See also ==
- Complexity science
- enterprise
- Entrepreneurship ecosystem
- Exchange
- Institutional
- Interdependence
- Knowledge
- Organization
- Social good
- Social networks
- Value (economics)
- Value chain
- Value conversion
- Value network
- Value network analysis
