= Ally (name) =

- Pronunciation: /ˈæli/
- Gender: Unisex
- Language: English

Origin
- Languages: English and other languages
- Origin: Diminutive form of several names beginning with Al-
- Meaning: "ally"
- Region of origin: English-speaking world

Other names
- Variant forms: Allie; Alli; Ali; Alley; Aly; Allee
- Related names: Allison, Alyson, Alison, Allyria, Allysya, Allyson, Alistair, Alister, Allistair, Allister, Alystair, Alyster, Allystair, Allyster, Alexander, Alexandra, Alyssa, Alan, Allen, Allan

Ally is a unisex given name, nickname and/or surname. It is a variant of Allie and Ali. It is used as a diminutive nickname for the given names Alison, Alexandra or Alyssa (feminine) or Alexander, Alister, or Alan (masculine). Notable people with the name include:

== Given name ==
=== Female ===
- Ally Acker (born 1954), American filmmaker
- Ally Anderson (born 1996), Australian rules footballer
- Ally Angula (born 1979), Namibian accountant, business executive, and politician
- Ally Baker (born 1986), American tennis player
- Ally Blake, Australian writer
- Ally Brooke (born 1993), American singer
- Ally Carda (born 1993), American softball player
- Ally Carter (born 1974), American author of young adult and adult fiction
- Ally Condie (born 1971), American author
- Ally Cook (born 2000), American soccer player
- Ally Ewing (born 1992), American professional golfer
- Ally Fowler (born 1961), Australian actress in 1980s soap operas
- Ally Green (born 1998), Australian soccer player
- Ally Haran (born 1996), Canadian-American soccer player
- Ally Hickman (born 2009), Australian snowboarder
- Ally Ioannides (born 1998), American actress
- Ally Kennen (born 1975), British author
- Ally Kuylaars (born 1971), South African cricketer
- Ally Langdon, Australian television presenter, journalist, reporter, and author
- Ally Lemos (born 2004), American professional soccer player
- Ally Louks (born 1997), English academic
- Ally Love, American sports host
- Ally Lundström (born 1935), Swedish figure skater
- Ally Maki (born 1986), American actress
- Ally Malott (born 1992), American basketball player
- Ally Marquand (born 1981), American soccer player
- Ally Mac Tyana, French actress and model
- Ally Mack (born 1982), American actress
- Ally McDonald (born 1992), American professional golfer
- Ally McTavish, Australian actress, writer, and producer
- Ally Morphett (born 2003), Australian rules footballer
- Ally Musika (born 1979), American writer
- Ally Pankiw (born 1986), Canadian television writer and director
- Ally Prisock (born 1997), American soccer player
- Ally Ryan, American singer-songwriter
- Ally Seifried, American politician
- Ally Sentnor (born 2004), American professional soccer player
- Ally Simpson (born 2000), American ice hockey player
- Ally Sheedy (born 1962), American actress
- Ally Schlegel (born 2000), American professional soccer player
- Ally Stacher (born 1987), American professional racing cyclist
- Ally Venable (born 1999), American guitar player
- Ally Walker (born 1961), American actress
- Ally Watt (born 1997), American soccer player
- Ally Wilkes, English author
- Ally Wilson (born 1994), Australian professional basketball player
- Ally Wollaston (born 2001), New Zealand cyclist

=== Male ===
- Ally Gallacher (1909–1964), Scottish football manager
- Ally Law (born 1997), English YouTuber and urban explorer
- Ally McCoist (born 1962), Scottish former footballer and manager
- Ally MacLeod (1931–2004), Scottish former footballer and manager
- Ally Maxwell (born 1965), Scottish football coach and former professional footballer
- Ally Shewan (1940–2024), Scottish footballer
- Ally Taylor (born 2001), Scottish footballer

== Surname ==
- Aziza Sleyum Ally, Member of Parliament in the National Assembly of Tanzania
- Carl Ally (1924–1999), American advertising executive who founded Ally & Gargano
- Haji Ally (born 1968), Tanzanian boxer
- Tony Ally (born 1973), British diver

== Fictional characters ==
- Ally Dawson, one of the two main characters in the television series Austin & Ally
- Ally McBeal, the titular character in the television series Ally McBeal
- Ally, a character in the Puyo Puyo series.

== See also ==
- Ally (disambiguation)
- Aly (disambiguation), includes a list of people with the name Aly
- Allee, given name and surname
- Allie, given name and surname
- Alley, given name and surname
