= John Lord (cricketer) =

Australian cricketer

Personal information
- Full name: John Carr Lord
- Born: 29 April 1844; Hobart, Van Diemen's Land
- Died: 25 May 1911 (aged 67); Antill Ponds, Tasmania, Australia
- Batting: Right-handed

Domestic team information
- Years: Team
- 1864: Hampshire
- 1873: Tasmania

Career statistics
Competition	First-class
Matches	2
Runs scored	29
Batting average	9.66
100s/50s	–/–
Top score	11
Catches/stumpings	1/–
- Source: Cricinfo, 11 January 2010

John Carr Lord (29 April 1844 – 25 May 1911) was an Australian first-class cricketer and racehorse breeder.

The son of James Lord, he was born at Hobart in April 1844. He was educated in England at Portsmouth. As a 19 year old, he played in Hampshire's inaugural first-class match against Sussex at Southampton in 1864. In what was a 10 wicket defeat for Hampshire, Lord opened the batting in Hampshire's first innings and was dismissed by for 11 runs by James Lillywhite, while in their second innings he batted at number 10 and was unbeaten on 4. Soon after he returned to Australia, later playing in a first-class match for Tasmania against Victoria at Launceston in 1873. Batting twice in the match, he was dismissed in the Tasmanian first innings for 11 runs by Daniel Wilkie, while in their second innings he was dismissed for 3 runs by Charles Allee.

In addition to being a well known cricketer, Lord was also a prominent figure in horse racing and horse breeding. He was secretary of the Midland Jockey Club and was an official with the Campbell Town Racing Club. He was present at the opening of the Southern Tasmanian Cricket Association Ground in 1882, playing in the first match to be played there between a Tasmanian XI and Melbourne Cricket Club. In later life he was a keen hunter and was master of the Midland hounds. Lord was a figure in Tasmanian municipal affairs, being a warden for Oatlands. He died at Antill Ponds in the Midlands region of Tasmania in May 1911, having suffered for sometime with heart problems brought about by a horse ride into Oatlands on a hot day. He was married, with one son and six daughters.

== See also ==
- List of Tasmanian representative cricketers
