= Allied Nations =

Allied Nations may refer to:

- Allies, states allied in a common cause
  - Allies of World War I
  - Allies of World War II

== In fiction ==
- An international body in Mercenaries: Playground of Destruction and its sequel, Mercenaries 2: World in Flames
- An international body in Street Fighter (1994 film)

== See also ==
- Allied Forces (disambiguation)
- Allied Powers (disambiguation)
