= Alli (disambiguation) =

Alli is a surname, a unisex given name, and a feminine given name.

Alli may also refer to:

- "Alli", a brand name for the medication Orlistat
- Alli (film), a 1964 Indian Tamil-language film
- Alli, Iran, a village
- Alliance of Independent Authors (ALLi)

== See also ==
- Ali (disambiguation)
- Allie (disambiguation)
- Ally (disambiguation)
