= Value network =

Business analysis describing social and technical resources within and between businesses

There is no agreed upon definition of value network. A general definition that subsumes the other definitions is that a value network is a network of roles linked by interactions in which economic entities engage in both tangible and intangible exchanges to achieve economic or social good. This definition is similar to one given by Verna Allee.

== Definitions ==
Different definitions provide different perspectives on the general concept of a value network.

=== Christensen ===
Clayton Christensen defines a value network as:

"The collection of upstream suppliers, downstream channels to market, and ancillary providers that support a common business model within an industry. When would-be disruptors enter into existing value networks, they must adapt their Business models to conform to the value network and therefore fail at disruption because they become co-opted."

=== Fjeldstad and Stabell: Value configurations ===
Fjeldstad and Stabell define a value network as one of three ways by which an organisation generates value. The others are the value shop and value chain.

Their value networks consist of the following components:

- customers,
- a service that enables interaction among them,
- an organization to provide the service, and
- contracts that enable access to the service

One example of a value network is that formed by social media users. The company provides a service, users contract with the company, and immediately have access to the value network of other customers.

A less obvious example is a car insurance company. The Company provides insurance. Customers can travel and interact in various ways while limiting risk exposure. The insurance policies represent the company's contracts and the internal processes.

Fjeldstad & Stabell and Christensen's concepts address how a Company understands itself and its value creation process, but they are not identical. Christensen's value networks address the relation between a Company and its suppliers and the requirements posed by the customers, and how these interact when defining what represents value in the product that is produced.

Fjeldstad and Stabell's value networks emphasize that the created value is between interacting customers, as facilitated by value networks.

=== Normann and Ramirez: Value constellations ===
Normann and Ramirez argued in 1993 that strategy is not a fixed set of activities along a value chain. Instead the focus should be on the value creating system. All stakeholders are obligated to produce value. Successful companies conceive of strategy as systematic social innovation.

=== Verna Allee: Value networks ===
Verna Allee defines value networks as any web of relationships that generates both tangible and intangible value through complex dynamic exchanges between two or more individuals, groups or organizations. Any organization or group of organizations engaged in both tangible and intangible exchanges can be viewed as a value network, whether private industry, government or public sector.

Allee developed Value network analysis, a whole systems mapping and analysis approach to understanding tangible and intangible value creation among participants in an enterprise system. Revealing the hidden network patterns behind business processes can provide predictive intelligence for when workflow performance is at risk. She believes value network analysis provides a standard way to define, map and analyse the participants, transactions and tangible and intangible deliverables that together form a value network. Allee says value network analysis can lead to profound shifts in perception of problem situations and mobilize collective action to implement change.

== Important terms and concepts ==
=== Tangible value ===
All exchanges of goods, services or revenue, including all transactions involving contracts, invoices, return receipts of orders, requests for proposals, confirmations and payments are considered to be tangible value. Products or services that generate revenue or are expected as part of a service are also included in the tangible value flow of goods, services, and revenue (2). In government agencies, these would be mandated activities. In civil society organizations, these would be formal commitments to provide resources or services.

=== Intangible value ===
Two primary sub-categories are included in intangible value: knowledge and benefits. Intangible knowledge exchanges include strategic information, planning knowledge, process knowledge, technical know-how, collaborative design and policy development; which support the product and service tangible value network. Intangible benefits are also considered favors that can be offered from one person to another. Examples include offering political or emotional support to someone. Another example of intangible value is when a research organization asks someone to volunteer their time and expertise to a project in exchange for the intangible benefit of prestige by affiliation (3).

All biological organisms, including humans, function in a self-organizing mode internally and externally. That is, the elements in our bodies—down to individual cells and DNA molecules—work together in order to sustain us. However, there is no central "boss" to control this dynamic activity. Our relationships with other individuals also progress through the same circular free flowing process as we search for outcomes that are best for our well-being. Under the right conditions these social exchanges can be extraordinarily altruistic. Conversely, they can also be quite self-centered and even violent. It all depends on the context of the immediate environment and the people involved.

=== A non-linear approach ===
Often, value networks are considered to consist of groups of companies working together to produce and transport a product to the customer. Relationships among customers of a single company are examples of how value networks can be found in any organization. Companies can link their customers together by direct methods like the telephone or indirect methods like combining customer's resources together.

The purpose of value networks is to create the most benefit for the people involved in the network (5). The intangible value of knowledge within these networks is just as important as a monetary value. In order to succeed knowledge must be shared to create the best situations or opportunities. Value networks are how ideas flow into the market and to the people that need to hear them.

Because value networks are instrumental in advancing business and institutional practices a value network analysis can be useful in a wide variety of business situations. Some typical ones are listed below.

==== Relationship management ====
Relationship management typically just focuses on managing information about customers, suppliers, and business partners. A value network approach considers relationships as two-way value-creating interactions, which focus on realizing value as well as providing value.

==== Business web and ecosystem development ====
Resource deployment, delivery, market innovation, knowledge sharing, and time-to-market advantage are dependent on the quality, coherence, and vitality of the relevant value networks, business webs and business ecosystems.

==== Fast-track complex process redesign ====
Product and service offerings are constantly changing – and so are the processes to innovate, design, manufacture, and deliver them. Multiple, interdependent, and concurrent processes are too complex for traditional process mapping, but can be analyzed very quickly with the value network method.

==== Reconfiguring the organization ====
Mergers, acquisitions, downsizing, expansion to new markets, new product groups, new partners, new roles and functions – anytime relationships change, value interactions and flows change too.

==== Supporting knowledge networks and communities of practice ====
Understanding the transactional dynamics is vital for purposeful networks of all kinds, including networks and communities focused on creating knowledge value. A value network analysis helps communities of practice negotiate for resources and demonstrate their value to different groups within the organization.

==== Develop scorecards, conduct ROI and cost/benefit analyses, and drive decision making ====
Because the value network approach addresses both financial and non-financial assets and exchanges, it expands metrics and indexes beyond the lagging indicators of financial return and operational performance – to also include leading indicators for strategic capability and system optimization.

== See also ==
- Creativity techniques
- Complexity science
- Value (economics)
- Value conversion
- Value network analysis
