= Alee (disambiguation) =

Alee is a term to meaning "away from the wind".

Alee may also refer to:

- Alee (singer), a Canadian country music singer-songwriter
- Alee Murtuza, a Bangladeshi academic

== See also ==
- Allee, a given name and surname
