= Selena Rocky Malone =

Australian LGBTI activist

Salena Rocky Malone
- Died: 22 May 2017
- Occupation: LGBTI rights activist
- Known for: LGBQTI activist

Selena "Rocky" Malone (died 22 May 2017), was an Australian Aboriginal LGBTQI activist, based in Brisbane. She was the coordinator and manager of Open Doors Youth Service, and one of the founding members of IndigiLez, an organization working to support LGBTQI Aboriginals and Torres Strait Islanders. For her LGBTQI activism, she received several awards, and was named by the Supreme Court of Queensland High Court Justice Michael Kirby as an important part of the LGBTQI movement in Queensland.

== Political activism ==
Malone started her involvement for Aboriginal and LGBTI causes as Aboriginal and LGBTI Liaison Officer within the Queensland Police Service. She was involved in various parts of the Australian LGBTI Community, including community groups such as PFLAG, Dykes on Bikes and the LGBTI Health Alliance. She was one of the founding members of IndigiLez, an organization working to support isolated Aboriginals and Torres Strait Islanders in the LGBTI community.

During several years, she was also a part of the management committee for the LGBTI Legal Service. At the time of her death, she was the General Manager and coordinator for the Open Doors Youth Service, an organization working for LGBTI youth at risk. As such, she was an important part of the LGBTI community in Brisbane and Queensland. Due to her engagement in Open Doors Youth Service, she got the award for Best Community Service as the Brisbane Pride Festival. She also received the award for "Lifetime Achievement" posthumously at the same Pride festival in 2017.

Malone was praised for her activism for LGBTQI causes at several occasions. In 2016, At the Supreme Court of Queensland, former High Court Justice Michael Kirby named Malone specifically when praising the work of the LGBTI Legal Service.

== Personal life ==
Outside of the political involvement, Malone was an active rugby league player, and competed for both regional and state teams, before she had to retire due to an injury in her knee.

== Death ==
Malone died in May 2017, after an accident with a motorcycle in Rockhampton, Australia.

== Bibliography ==
- Kerr, Joanna; Sprenger, Ellen; Symington, Alison (2004). The Future of Women's Rights: Global Visions and Strategies. Zed Books. ISBN 978-1-84277-459-5.
