= Allies (surname) =

Allies is a surname, and may refer to:

- Jabez Allies (1787–1856), English folklorist and antiquarian
- Mary Allies (1852–1927), English Catholic historian, writer and translator, daughter of Thomas William Allies
- Thomas William Allies (1813–1903), English religious historian

== See also ==
- Allis (surname)
