= Musgrave Park, Brisbane =

Park in Brisbane, Queensland, Australia

Coordinates: 27.4790°S 153.0166°E

Musgrave Park
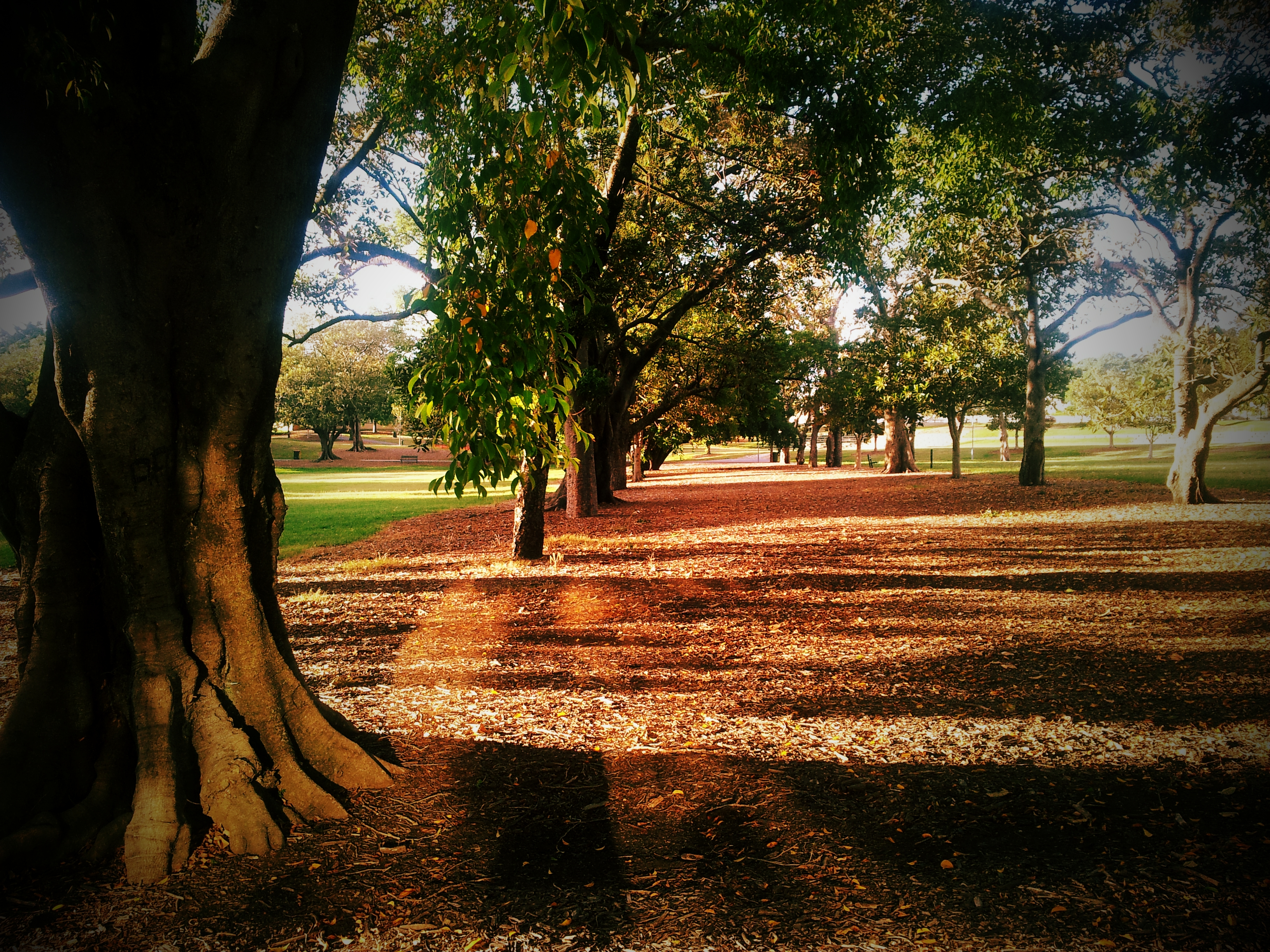
- Musgrave Park in South Brisbane
- Interactive map of Musgrave Park
- Location: Brisbane, Queensland, Australia
- Area: 6.3 hectares (16 acres)
- Created: 1856

Musgrave Park is a park in South Brisbane, Queensland, Australia. The park is bordered by Edmonstone, Russell, and Cordelia Streets, and Brisbane State High School, and has an area of 63,225 square metres (680,550 sq ft). The park is of cultural significance to Aboriginal Australians.

The park and the former bowls clubhouse (now used as a community centre) are listed on the Brisbane Heritage Register.

== History ==
Musgrave Park is a remnant of the former Kurilpa (South Brisbane) Aboriginal camping ground that stretched from "Highgate Hill and on (to) the slanting slopes of Cumboomeya (Somerville House)" and additionally "sometimes they made a camp in the little scrub then situated on the river bank near the recent entrance to the Dry Dock". From here and Woolloongabba, Aboriginal people in the 1840s and 1850s would go into South Brisbane to work chopping wood, carrying water, and selling fish. The South Brisbane Recreation Reserve (as it was originally known) was created in 1856. In 1867, it was proposed to build a public grammar school (Brisbane State High School) adjacent to the reserve. In 1884, it was renamed Musgrave Park after the then Governor of Queensland, Sir Anthony Musgrave.

An effort to collect documents related to the Aboriginal historical links to the park was spearheaded by Bob Weatherall in 1983. In 1985, the Musgrave Park Report was released, identifying Indigenous links to the area. In 1998, the Brisbane City Council allocated part of the park for the establishment of an Indigenous cultural centre. The council has described the park as a place for holding feasts, ceremonies and dispute resolution.

In 1982, Denis Walker, son of famous Australian poet, Kath Walker (Oodgeroo Noonuccal) was shot at during an Aboriginal protest. About 500 Aboriginals were set up in tents at Musgrave Park to organise their land-rights protest during the Commonwealth Games.

== Current use ==
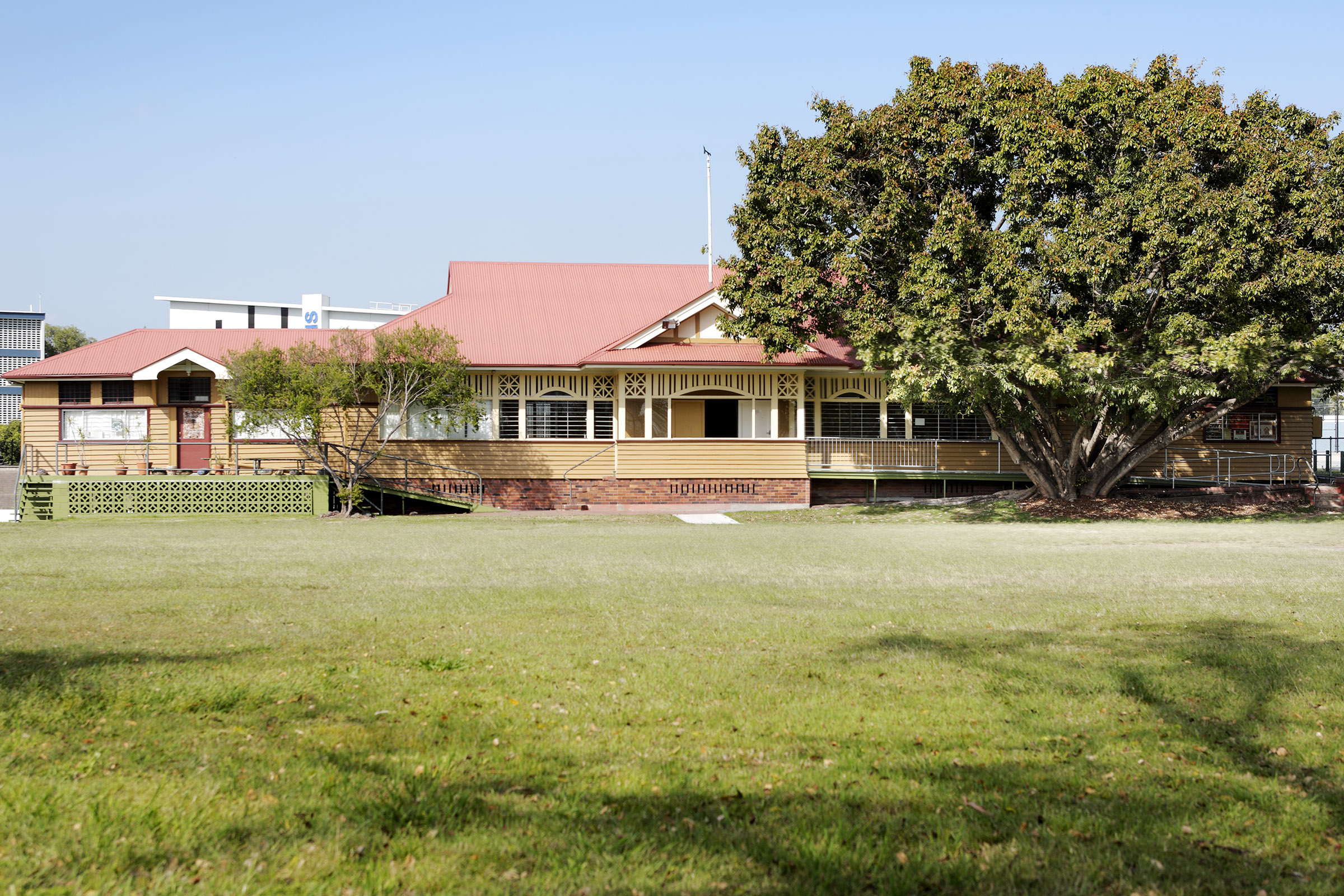
Jagera Arts Centre, 2011

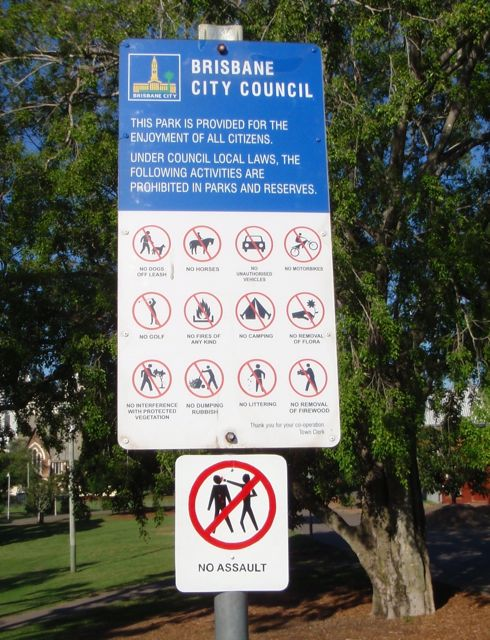
Safety sign in Musgrave Park

Musgrave Park is home to the Jagera Arts Centre (formerly the lawn bowls clubhouse) and is one of the few remaining green spaces left in Brisbane's inner city. On 24 August 1998, after twenty years of legal struggles with the Queensland state government, the Musgrave Park Aboriginal Corporation (MPAC) secured a lease to build a cultural centre on portions of the park. The park holds special significance to the local indigenous population due to a past restriction barring the Aboriginal people from crossing the park and entering the city of Brisbane. Notably, being the site of a buried bora ring, it has historically been a sacred site to the native Murri people.

Each year, the park hosts the Paniyiri Greek Festival, the National Aboriginal and Islander Day of Celebration (NAIDOC) Park Day, and the Lesbian and Gay Brisbane Pride Festival Fair Day.

In 2020, the last day of National Reconciliation Week was marked by a candlelight vigil in Musgrave Park on 3 June 2020, with 432 candles lit for each of the Aboriginal deaths in custody since the 1991 end of the Royal Commission into Aboriginal Deaths in Custody, and an extra one for George Floyd, an Afro-American man killed by a police officer.

== See also ==
- List of festivals in Brisbane
- List of parks in Brisbane
