= Outstreaming =

Outstreaming is an organizational strategy whereby a product is both sold to outside customers and provided to internal customers, simultaneously.

Most firms internalize parts of the value chain (vertical integration) in order to gain control over quality, but it can also become an opportunity to access new markets. Outstreaming is used by firms to subsidize investments in vertical integration, to learn about the requirements and design to the specification of outside firms (learning from new customers), and to reintegrate learned behaviors into the firm's internal products.
