= Alexandra McTavish =

Australian actress, writer and producer

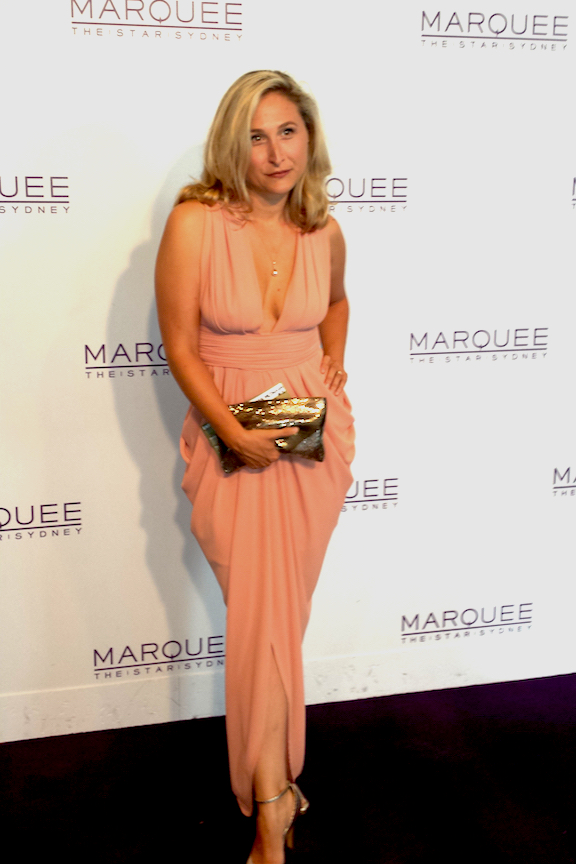
- Alexandra McTavish at 2015 AACTA Awards, Sydney, Australia
- Born: Alexandra; Hong Kong
- Occupations: Writer, actress, producer

Alexandra McTavish is an Australian actress, writer and producer best known for Neighbours (2014), House Husbands (2012), Mako Mermaids (2013), and her self-penned comedy, Sport (2015). Born in Hong Kong to Australian parents, she is also co-founder and producer of the Anywhere Festival.

== Personal life ==
McTavish grew up in Hong Kong but moved to Australia to attend the University of Queensland, graduating in 2000 with a Bachelor of Journalism in broadcasting. She subsequently relocated to the UK to study acting at Rose Bruford College. Growing up she also loved to write so she then pursued writing, and finally screenwriting at Australia's national screen arts and broadcast school, the Australian Film, Television and Radio School.

== Film and television ==
=== Actress ===
Year	Title	Role	Notes
2016	The Legacy	Lead	Short film
2016	An Angel of Light	Supporting	Feature film
2016	Tabernacle 101	Support	Feature film
2014-15	House Husbands	Guest Role	TV series
2015	Sport	Lead	TV series (pilot)
2014, 2017	Neighbours	Guest	TV series
2013	White Blank Page	Lead	Short film
2013	Mako Mermaids	Guest	TV series
2012	Bad Karma	Featured	Feature film
2011	Headsmen	Support	Short film
2010	Undertow	Stunts	Film
2009	The Fall of Erebus	Lead	Short film
2009	Dirty Step Upstage	Featured	Feature film
2008	Essayette	Lead	Feature film
2007	South of Pico	Featured	Feature film
2007	All My Friends Are Leaving Brisbane	Featured	Feature film
2007	The Starter Wife	Featured	TV series
2007	South of Pico	Featured	Feature film

=== Producer ===
- Anywhere Theatre Festival
- Sport (2015)
- 3000 Hands (2013)

=== Writer ===
- Sport (2015)
