= Paniyiri Greek Festival =

Cultural festival in Brisbane, Australia

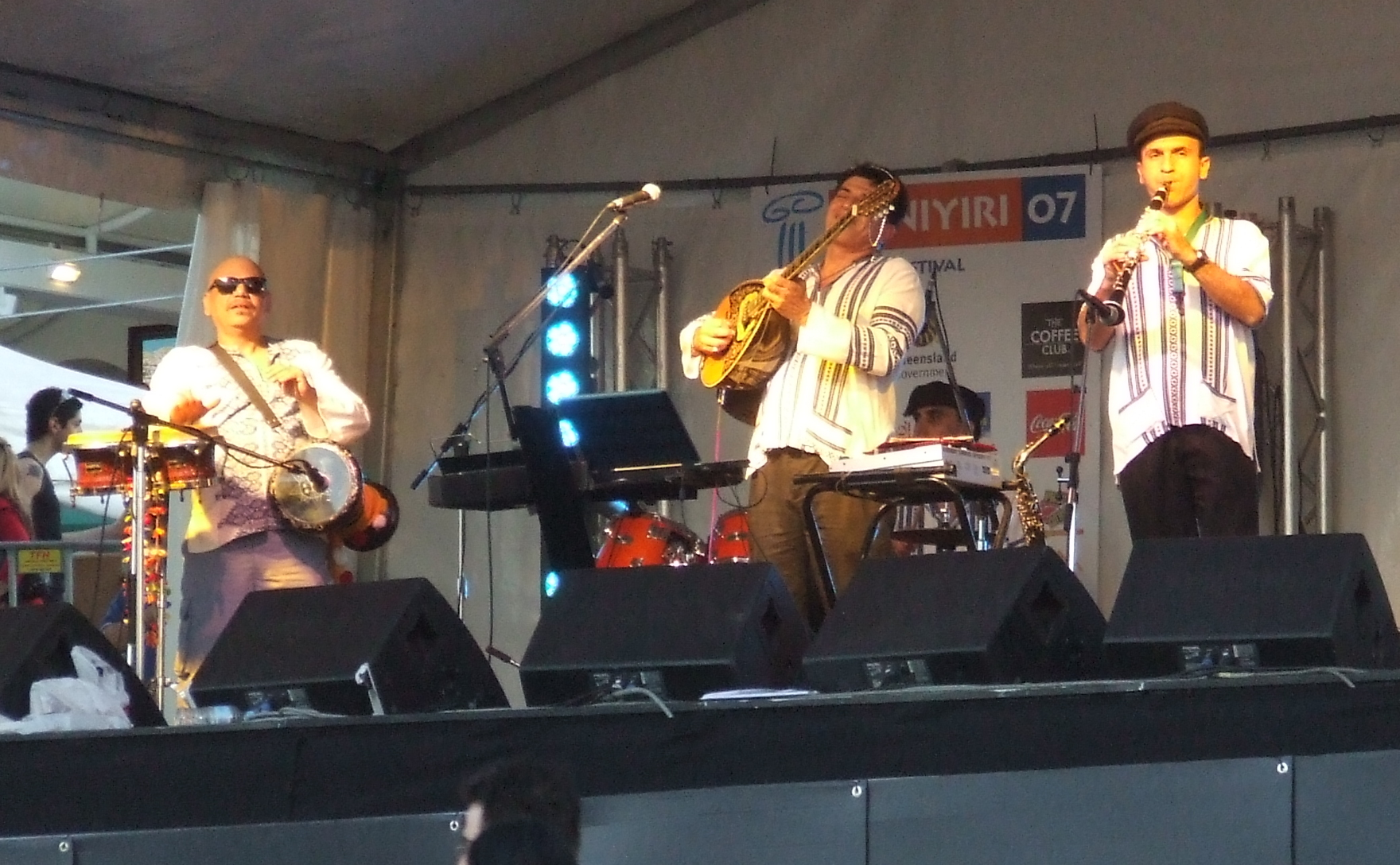
- Music, Paniyiri Greek Festival, 2007
- Genre: Greek festival
- Frequency: Annually
- Locations: South Brisbane, Queensland
- Inaugurated: 1976
- Founder: The very reverend Father Gregory Sakellariou (MBE)
- Most recent: 18-19 October 2024
- Next event: 17-18 May 2025
- Attendance: 50,000+

The Paniyiri Greek Festival is usually held in May each year in Musgrave Park, Brisbane, Queensland, Australia. It is the longest running cultural festival in Queensland and the longest running Greek festival in Australia. It is named after the village festivals in Greece called "Paniyiria" (πανηγύρια) which are held throughout Greece during the summer. The Brisbane festival is famous for its food, music and Hellenic dancing. Crowds of up to 60,000 people flock to the two-day festivities, and over a thousand volunteers help in the running of Queensland's largest festival.

== History ==
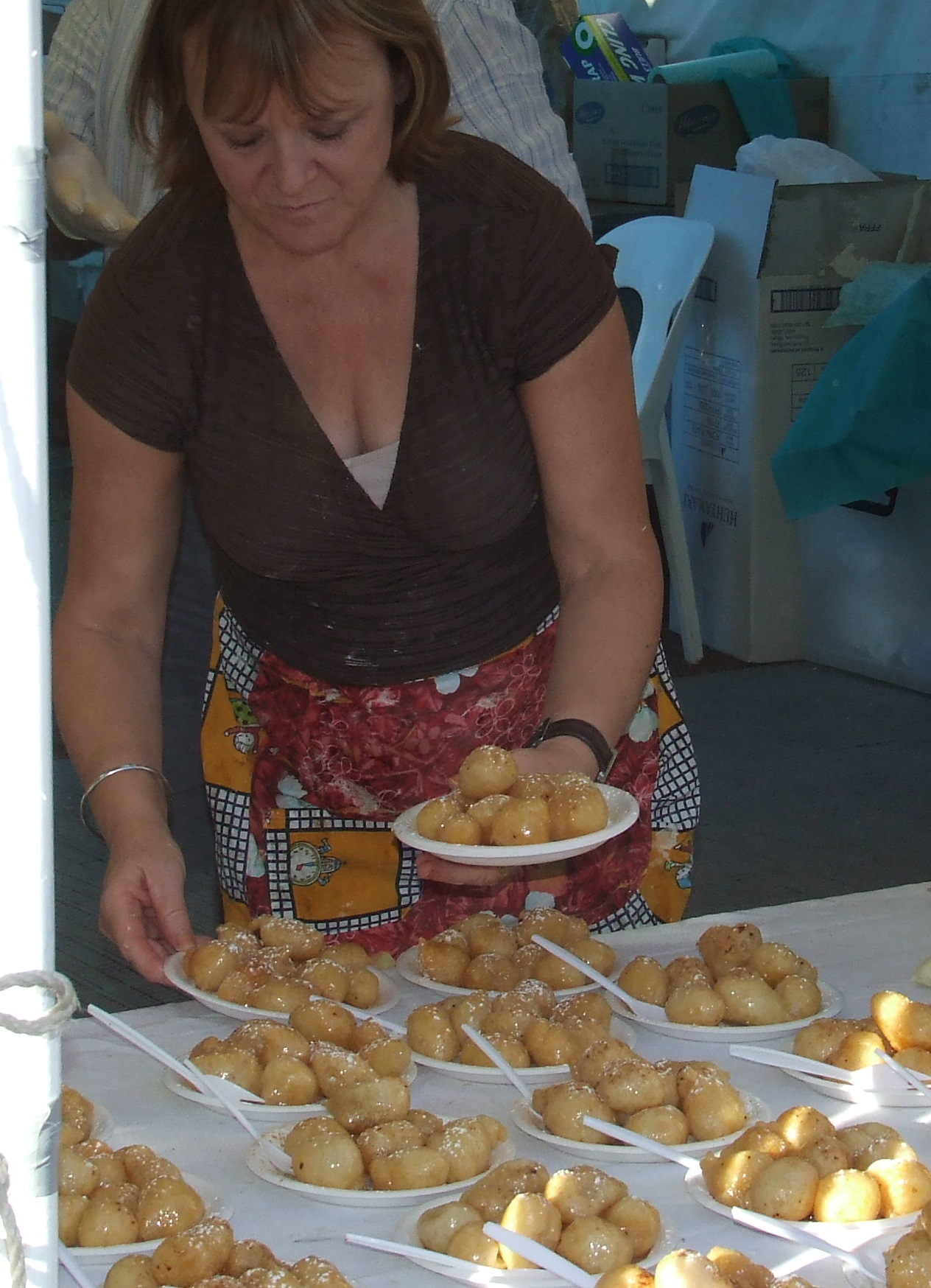
Honey puffs, a popular treat

The festival was started in 1976, making it the longest running cultural festival in Queensland, and the longest running Greek festival in Australia. It was initiated by Father Gregory Sakellariou (MBE), with the aim of bringing the Greek community together and sharing their culture with the people of Brisbane.

The outdoor festival was cancelled in 2020 due to the COVID-19 pandemic, but recipes for cooking at home and some online activities were provided as an alternative.

In 2022, the event was postponed to 15–16 October due to wet weather in May.

== Honours ==
In 2009 as part of the Q150 celebrations, the Paniyiri Greek Festival was announced as one of the Q150 Icons of Queensland for its role as an "event and festival".

== See also ==
- List of festivals in Brisbane
