= James F. Moore =

American business strategist (born 1948)

- Born: 1948 (age 77–78); Champaign, Illinois
- Employer(s): Berkman Fellow, Berkman Center for Internet & Society Harvard Law School 2000 -- 2004
- Known for: Business ecosystem
- Spouse: Sarah R. Moore

Academic background
- Education: Williams College; Episcopal Divinity School; Harvard University; Stanford University

Academic work
- Notable works: The Death of Competition: Leadership and strategy in the age of business ecosystems, HarperBusiness, New York, 1996

James Frederick Moore studies co-evolution in social and economic systems. He is best known for pioneering the Business ecosystem approach to studying networks of organizations that together constitute a system of mutual support and that co-evolve contributions. The business ecosystem is a form of organization distinct from and parallel to markets and firms. Moore argues that business ecosystem is an essential unit of analysis for competition law, economics, sociology and management—a concept and unit of analysis that has been found necessary and helpful in business strategy and practice for many years.

His recent work involves an in-depth study of the multiple and interconnected Nano science, semiconductor, System-on-Chips, global telecommunications services, smartphones and Internet-of-things devices, and app ecosystems.

== Academia ==
Moore was a Senior Fellow at Harvard Law School's Berkman Center for Internet & Society from 2000 to 2004. He studied the interaction of law, technology and economic development in Africa.

Moore is on the Dean's Council of the Harvard School of Public Health and is a member of the International Advisory Board of the Harvard AIDS Institute and the Harvard AIDS Initiative.

== Activism ==
In the spring of 2003, Moore began advocating against the US invasion of Iraq and wrote "The Second Superpower Rears its Beautiful Head" which imagines how citizens worldwide might someday join through Internet technology, engage international institutions, and help set global policy.

In the Winter of 2003-4, Moore was Director of Internet and Information Services for the Howard Dean campaign for US President.

In 2004, he co-founded the human rights blog "Passion of the Present" and blogged daily for more than a year to mobilize support for the victims of genocide in Darfur, Sudan. He was instrumental in the early days of Save Darfur Coalition, as well as the Genocide Intervention Network.

== Business strategy ==
In an earlier career, Moore was a business strategist. He pioneered the term "business ecosystem" and was central in developing an ecological approach to business and economic strategy.

He presented an early version of this approach in a Harvard Business Review article entitled Predators and Prey: A New Ecology of Competition in May/June 1993, as well as in a book, The Death of Competition: Leadership and Strategy in the Age of Business Ecosystems
