= Aly (surname) =

Aly is a surname. Notable people with the surname include:

- Abdoulatifou Aly (born 1960), French politician from Mayotte
- Amir Aly, Swedish songwriter and record producer
- Amr Aly (born 1962), American association footballer
- Götz Aly (born 1947), German journalist and historian
- Hassan Aly, politician from Madagascar
- Mohamed Aly (boxer) (born 1975), Egyptian boxer
- Waleed Aly, Australian academic and television presenter

== See also ==
- Ali (name)
