= ALY (disambiguation) =

ALY or Aly may refer to:

== People ==
- Aly (given name), including a list of people with the given name
- Aly (surname), including a list of people with the surname

== Rail stations and railroads with the code ALY ==
- Albany station (Oregon), US
- Albury railway station, Australia
- Allegheny Railroad, US
- Allegheny and Eastern Railroad, US
- Prayagraj Rambagh railway station, Prayagraj, India, former station code ALY

== Other uses ==
- Alexandria International Airport (Egypt), Alexandria, Egypt, IATA airport code ALY
- Aly, short for "Alley"; a street suffix in the US

== See also ==
- Ally (disambiguation)
- Ali (disambiguation)
- Alloy
- Alley
