= Brack Cornett =

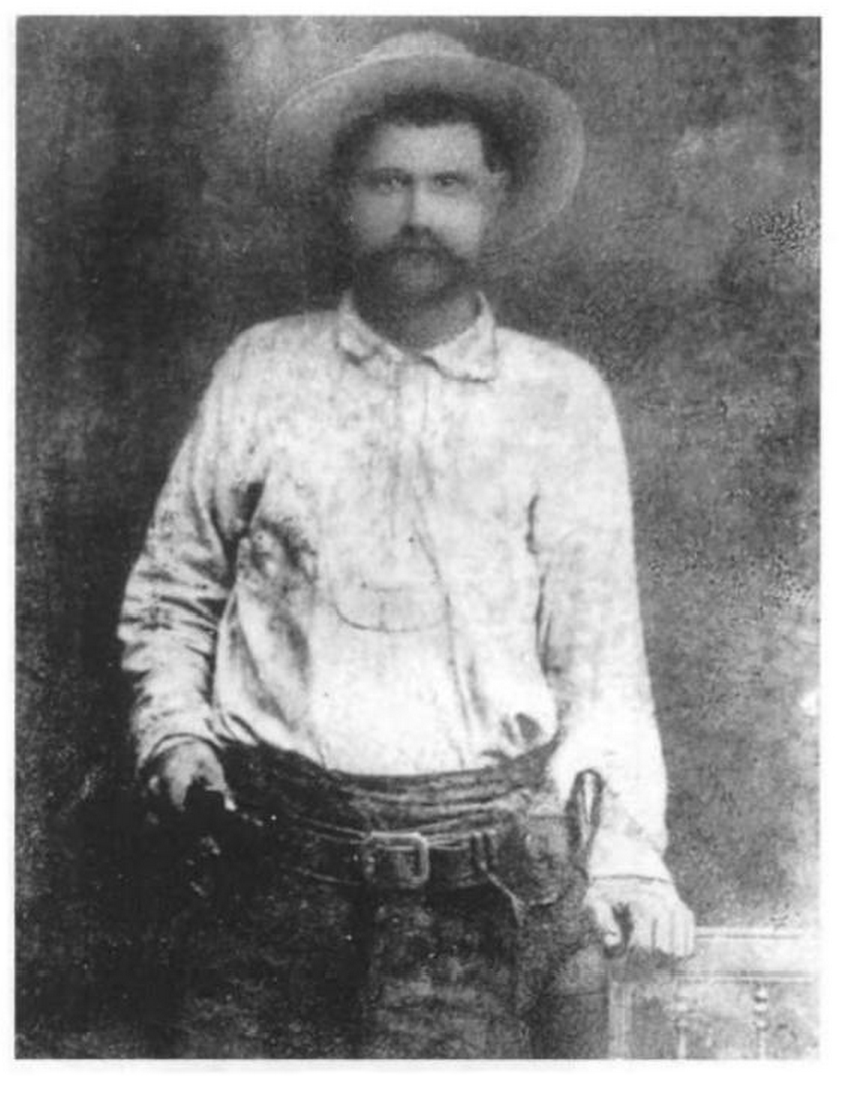
"Brack Cornett", outlaw of the American West, from Western History Collections, University of Oklahoma Libraries

Braxton "Brack" Cornett (22 May 1841 – 22 January 1888) was a Texas outlaw from 1887 to 1888. He grew up in south Texas, in and around Goliad County.

== Life ==
He is most well known as a member of the Bill Whitley gang (though it is today sometimes referred to as the Brack Cornett gang). The gang was formed in February 1887 to rob trains, but their first outing in early May 1887 was a bust. However, on 18 May, they robbed the Missouri-Pacific train while it was stopped at McNeill Junction, thirteen miles outside of San Antonio, getting away with about $4,000. The next month they robbed the east bound train from San Antonio near Flatonia, in Fayette County, getting away with over $7,000.

In 1888, Whitley, Cornett, and the gang robbed the bank in Cisco, Texas, escaping with $25,000. Several days later they stopped an I&GN train and stole $20,000. On June 18, 1888, Cornett, using the alias "Captain Dick" led the band that robbed the Southern Pacific near Schulenburg, Texas. It was "the most daring train robbery that ever occurred in Texas", according to The New York Times.

Later that same year Cornett and the gang planned to rob a Southern Pacific train out of Harwood, Texas, on September 22. U.S. Marshal John Rankin somehow received advance notice of the robbers' plans and hid himself, Deputy Duval West, and a number of Texas Rangers on board the train. Just three miles outside of town, the gang stopped the train and attempted to rob it but were driven off by the lawmen. However, the gang then went on to successful rob another train near Flatonia, Texas.

On September 25, 1888, in Floresville, Wilson County, Texas, the gang was run to ground by a contingent of U.S. Marshals There was a massive shootout in which Bill Whitley was killed and one other gang member taken prisoner. Cornett himself fled alone on horseback. There are two stories about how Cornett met his death at the hands of Texas lawman Alfred Allee near the town of Frio, Texas. In one version, Cornett was tracked down and shot dead in a gun battle; in the other, Cornett, on the lam, sought out his childhood friend Allee on his La Salle County ranch just south of Frio; Allee welcomed him with a six-shooter instead of breakfast. Regardless, Allee collected various express company rewards of $3,800 for bringing down Cornett.

== Aliases ==
- Harrington
- Jones
- George Lacy
- James W. Johnson
- McGinty

== Sources ==
- Nash, Robert (1994). Encyclopedia of Western Lawmen & Outlaws. Da Capo. ISBN 0-306-80591-X.
