= Value network analysis =

Value network analysis (VNA) is a methodology for understanding, using, visualizing, optimizing internal and external value networks and complex economic ecosystems. The methods include visualizing sets of relationships from a dynamic whole systems perspective. Robust network analysis approaches are used for understanding value conversion of financial and non-financial assets, such as intellectual capital, into other forms of value.

The value conversion question is critical in both social exchange theory that considers the cost/benefit returns of informal exchanges and more classical views of exchange value where there is concern with conversion of value into financial value or price.

== Overview ==
Value network analysis offers a taxonomy for non-financial business reporting, which is becoming increasingly important in SEC Filings. In some approaches taxonomies are supported by Extensible Business Reporting Language XBRL. Venture capitalists and investors are concerned with the capability of a firm to create value in future. Financial statements are limited to current and past financial indicators and valuations of capital assets. In contrast, value network analysis is one approach to assessing current and future capability for value creation and to describe and analyze a business model.

Advocates of VNA claim that strong value-creating relationships support successful business endeavors at the operational, tactical, and strategic levels. A value network perspective, in this context would encompass both internal and external value networks — loose yet complex configurations of roles within industries, businesses, business units or functions and teams within organizations that engage in mutually beneficial relationships. Tools used in the past to analyze business value creation, such as the value chain and value added, are linear and mechanistic approaches based on a process perspective. These approaches are considered inadequate to address this new level of business complexity where value creating activities occur in complex, interdependent and dynamic relationships between multiple sets of actors.

Other claims for value network analysis are

- that it is an essential skill for a successful enterprise dependent on knowledge exchanges and collaborative relationships, which are seen as critical in almost every industry.
- that this type of analysis helps individuals and work groups better manage their interactions and address operational issues, such as balancing workflows or improving communication.
- that the approach also scales up to the business level to help forge stronger value-creating linkages with strategic partners and improve stakeholder relationships.
- that it also connects with other modeling tools such as Lean Manufacturing, Six Sigma, workflow tools, business process reengineering, business process management, social network analysis tools and system dynamics.

== Basics of value network analysis ==
Value network analysis addresses both financial and non-financial value. Every business relationship includes contractual or mandated activities between participants — and also informal exchanges of knowledge, favors, and benefits. The analysis begins with a visual map or diagram that first shows the essential contractual, tangible revenue- or funding-related business transactions and exchanges that occur between each node of the networks. Nodes represent real people, typically individuals, groups of individuals such as a business unit or aggregates of groups such as a type of business in an industry network. During analysis when adopting a reflective, double loop or generative learning mode, it is beneficial to regard nodes as role plays (shortened to roles). Practitioners have found {2} that conversation between participants about role plays within a larger whole invariably results in transforming individual behaviour and gaining commitment to implementing needed change as elaborated below.

Along with the more traditional business transactions the critical intangible exchanges are also mapped. Intangible exchanges are those mostly informal knowledge exchanges and benefits or support that build relationships and keep things running smoothly. These informal exchanges are actually the key to creating trust and opening pathways for innovation and new ideas. Traditional business practices ignore these important intangible exchanges, but they are made visible with a value network analysis.

The visualizations and diagrams link to a variety of assessments, usually handled in spreadsheets — to increase value outputs, to leverage knowledge and intangibles for improving financial and organizational performance, and to find new value opportunities. When the analysis is complete people gain insights into what is actually happening now, where more value can be realized, and what is required to achieve maximum value benefit across the entire business activity that is the focus of the analysis.

It is conventional to refer to the actual "things" that move from one Participant to another as "deliverables," whether tangible or intangible. If users find it conceptually unusual or contextually difficult to refer to an intangible (informal) thing as a "deliverable," they may, instead, prefer to use an alternative descriptive term "contribution."

== Complementary analysis ==
After the value network diagram has been prepared, it can be used to perform three complementary analyses:

1. exchange analysis: investigation of the general pattern of the exchanges in the network, sufficient reciprocity, existence of weak or inefficient links
2. impact analysis: can an involved party create value from the received inputs
3. value creation analysis: assessment of the value increases that an output triggers for the customer and how the company itself benefits from it

== See also ==
- Value Network
- Value shop
