= Verna Allee =

American business consultant and writer

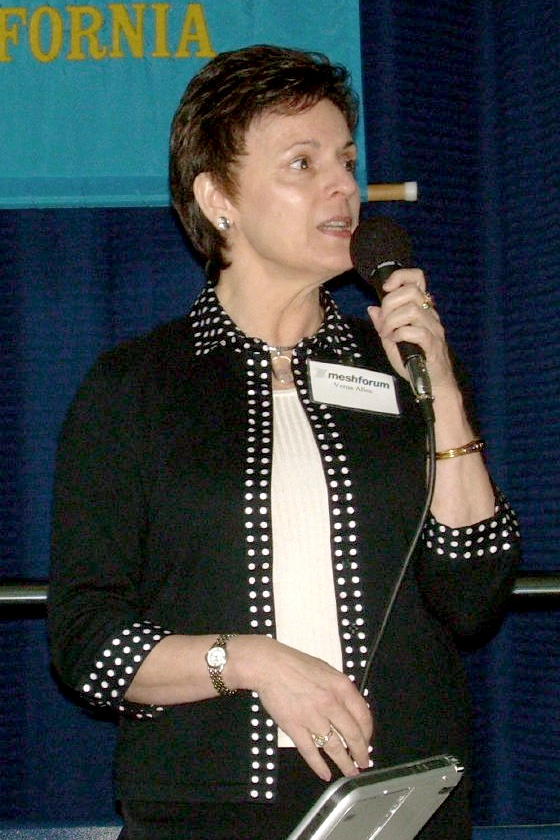
- Born: Kansas
- Website: www.vernaallee.com/

Verna Allee (born 1949 in Kansas, United States) is an American business consultant and writer on topics including value networks, knowledge management, organizational intelligence, intellectual capital and the value conversion of intangibles.

Allee holds a B.A. in Social Science, and an M.A. in Human Consciousness, specializing in Organizational Leadership.

Verna Allee has authored or co-authored three books on value networks and organizational knowledge. Her book The Knowledge Evolution: Expanding Organizational Intelligence offers a road map for understanding knowledge creation, learning, and performance in everyday work. The book The Future of Knowledge: Increasing Prosperity through Value Networks is about how the networked organization can be understood at a practical everyday level.

Allee is CEO of Value Networks LLC. She lives in Martinez, California, USA.

== Books ==
- Allee, Verna (1997). The Knowledge Evolution: Expanding Organizational Intelligence. Boston: Butterworth-Heinemann. ISBN 0-7506-9842-X.
- Allee, Verna (2002). The Future of Knowledge: Increasing Prosperity Through Value Networks. Amsterdam: Butterworth-Heinemann. ISBN 0-7506-7591-8.
- Allee, Verna; Chandra, Dinesh, eds. (2004). What is True Wealth & How Do We Create It?. New Delhi: Indigo Press. ISBN 81-85160-04-X.
