= Aly (given name) =

Aly is a given name. Notable people with the name include:

- Aly Abeid (born 1997), Mauritanian footballer
- Aly Abdel Aziz (born 1947), Egyptian professional squash player
- Aly Arriola (born 1989), Honduran footballer
- Aly Attyé (born 1964), Senegalese judoka
- Aly Bain (born 1946), Shetland fiddler
- Aly Camara (born 1986), Guinean association footballer
- Aly Cissokho (born 1987), French association footballer of Senegalese descent
- Aly Coulibaly (born 1996), French footballer
- Aly El Dawoudi (born 1949), Egyptian tennis player
- Aly Doerfel (1949–2021), Luxembourgish fencer
- Aly El-Shafei, Egyptian academic
- Aly Goni (born 1991), Indian actor
- Aly González (born 1991), Venezuelan baseball manager
- Aly Hassan (born 1989), American soccer player
- Aly Hindy, Canadian imam
- Aly Jaerling (born 1948), Luxembourgish politician
- Aly Keita (born 1986), Guinean footballer
- Aly Khan (1911–1960), Aga Khan IV's father
- Aly Muhammad Aga Khan (born 2000), Aga Khan IV's son
- Aly Knepper (born 1940), Luxembourgish sports shooter
- Aly Lotfy Mahmoud (1935–2018), Egyptian politician
- Aly Mallé (born 1998), Malian footballer
- Aly Michalka (born 1989), American actress
- Aly Monroe, British writer
- Aly Morani, Indian film producer
- Aly Muldowney (born 1983), English rugby union player
- Aly Ndom (born 1996), French footballer
- Aly Maher Pasha (1881–1960), Egyptian political figure
- Aly Raisman (born 1994), American gymnast
- Aly Saad (born 1954), Egyptian professor
- Aly Tadros (born 1986), American singer
- Aly Wagner (born 1980), American association footballer
- Aly Yirango (born 1994), Malian footballer
- Aly Zaker (born 1944), Bangladeshi actor

== See also ==
- Ali (name)
- Ally (name)
