= Allie (disambiguation) =

Allie is a given name and surname. It may also refer to:

== People ==
- Allie (wrestler), a ring name of Canadian professional wrestler Laura Dennis (born 1987)
- Allie (musician), stage name of 21st century Canadian rhythm and blues singer and songwriter Allison Ho-Sang
- Allie X or a l l i e, stage name of Canadian singer, songwriter and visual artist Alexandra Ashley Hughes (born 1985)

== Places ==
- Lake Allie, Minnesota, United States
- Allie Creek, Missouri, United States

== Other uses ==
- Stass Allie, a Star Wars Jedi

== See also ==
- Allie's Donuts, a doughnut shop in North Kingstown, Rhode Island, United States
- Ally (disambiguation)
