= Ally Ryan =

American singer

- Born: Los Angeles, United States
- Genres: Pop
- Occupation: Singer-songwriter
- Years active: 2017–present
- Website: imallyryan.com

Ally Ryan is an American singer-songwriter based in Los Angeles. She gained recognition for having written Kat Deluna's single "Waves" which peaked at number one in Japan. Her debut single "Wasted" has been successful, charting on multiple Billboard charts.

== Early life and career ==
At around the age of three, she got her first microphone and started writing songs at the age of thirteen. She began her career as a songwriter, writing songs for artists.

She described the inspiration behind her debut single "Waves" as a "toxic relationship" she was in, and the song as 'catchy, fun and relatable'. She told Digital Journal: "It is about a love that is so intense that it becomes toxic." In August 2017, she released an acoustic version and a month later, a remixes EP of the song. A music video for the song was also published.

== Discography ==
=== As lead artist ===
Title	Year	Peak chart positions	Album
Title	Year	US Club	Album
"Wasted"	2017	24	Non-album single
