= Daniel Wilkie =

Australian cricketer

Personal information
- Born: 1 December 1843; Melbourne, Australia
- Died: 11 May 1917 (aged 73); Melbourne, Australia

Domestic team information
- Years: Team
- 1865-1873: Victoria
- Source: Cricinfo, 3 May 2015

Daniel Wilkie (1 December 1843 – 11 May 1917) was an Australian cricketer. He played three first-class cricket matches for Victoria between 1865 and 1873.

Wilkie attended Scotch College in his youth and learnt cricket and he represented his University cricket team before playing for East Melbourne. He scored the club's first century in 1861. He began his career as a slow roundarm bowler but became a highly successful underarm bowler and respected batsman. In his career he was a solicitor in Melbourne.

== See also ==
- List of Victoria first-class cricketers
