= Anywhere Festival =

Australian festival for performance outside theatres

Coordinates: 27°28′16″S 153°01′22″E

- Frequency: Annually
- Locations: initially Brisbane, now all over the country
- Country: Australia
- Inaugurated: 2011; 15 years ago
- Next event: 17 July 2025; 15 months ago to 3 August 2025
- Website: www.anywhere.is

Anywhere Festival is an annual Brisbane based festival for performance anywhere but traditional theatre spaces. The first anywhere-but-in-a-traditional-theatre concept was brought to Brisbane in 2011 by creative director Paul Osuch.

External videos
- Festival Director Paul Osuch talking about Anywhere Festival at TEDxBrisbane 2011

"The festival is about theatre anywhere but in a theatre," explains Paul Osuch, the mastermind behind the festival. "I could see people wanted exciting theatre that didn't have to happen in a theatre," he says. "What kicked it over the line was when English actor Ian McKellen couldn't find a theatre space in Brisbane to bring his acclaimed Waiting for Godot. I figured that if he had trouble getting into a Brisbane theatre there were probably a lot of less-well-known theatre producers with the same problem."

The festival is held in Brisbane and Moreton Bay and has been held in Brisbane, Mackay, Noosa, Sunshine Coast, Frankston, Woolloongong and Parramatta.

== History ==
The festival began in 2011 as the Anywhere Festival, Brisbane but became known as the Anywhere Festival in 2014 to expand its remit beyond traditional "theatre". It was created and directed by Paul Osuch.

In 2014, the first Anywhere Festival was presented in Frankston and in 2015 grew to include Brisbane, Mackay, Dysart, Middlemount, Moranbah Parramatta and Frankston.

In 2017, the festival expanded to Noosa and Sunshine Coast with Toni Wills and Nycole Prowse joining.

== See also ==
- List of festivals in Brisbane
