= Allied (automobile) =

Defunct American motor vehicle manufacturer

Allied Cab Manufacturing Co.
- Industry: Automobile
- Founded: 1932
- Defunct: 1935
- Headquarters: Elkhart, Indiana, USA
- Products: Taxicabs

The Allied automobile was a taxicab built in Elkhart, Indiana, by the Allied Cab Manufacturing Co. The company started production in 1932, using the factory of the Elcar automobile, which had ended production in 1931. Several former Elcar employees who had been involved with the production of Elcar taxicabs, joined the new company. Production of the Allied taxicab ended in 1934, followed by small production of the Super Allied taxicab in 1935.
