= List of festivals in Brisbane =

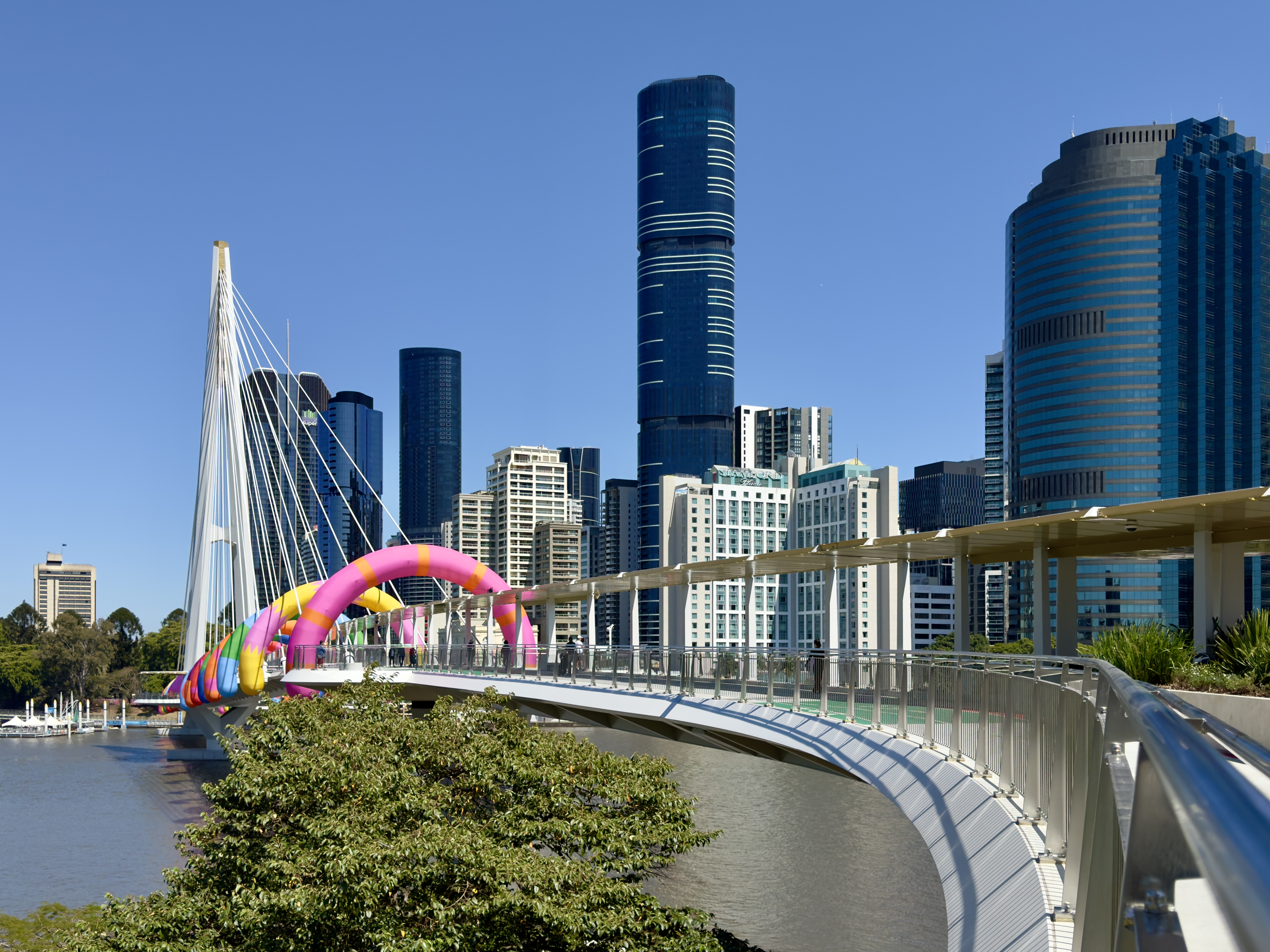
Kangaroo Point Bridge during Brisbane Festival, 2025

Following is a list of festivals that take place in Brisbane, Australia.

== By type ==
=== General ===
- 4MBS Festival of Classics
- Asia Pacific Triennial of Contemporary Art
- Brisbane Festival
- Brisbane International Boat Show
- Parklife
- Redlands Spring Festival
- St Jerome's Laneway Festival
- Straight Out of Brisbane
- Valley Fiesta

=== Comedy ===
- Bris Funny Fest
- Brisbane Street Art Festival
- Brisbane Comedy Festival

=== Film ===
- Brisbane International Film Festival
- Queensland Film Festival

=== LGBT ===
- Brisbane Pride Festival
- Northern Exposure – an event for bears and their admirers

=== Theater and poetry ===
- Queensland Poetry Festival
- Brisbane Shakespeare Festival
- Anywhere Theatre Festival

=== Food ===
- Caxton Street Seafood and Wine Festival
- Centenary Rocks! Festival
- Le Festival

=== Cultural and folk ===
- FAST (Festival of Australian Student Theatre)
- MOSAIC Multicultural Festival
- Paniyiri Greek Festival

=== Music ===
- Stereosonic
- Future Music Festival
- Soundwave
- Good Things Festival

== See also ==
- Culture of Brisbane
- List of festivals in Australia
