= Nazeer Allie =

South African footballer (born 1985)

Personal information
- Full name: Nazeer Allie
- Date of birth: 23 May 1985 (age 41)
- Place of birth: Cape Town, South Africa
- Height: 1.75 m (5 ft 9 in)
- Position: Right back

Team information
- Current team: Cape Town Spurs
- Number: 2

Youth career
- Vasco Da Gama
- 2000–2005: Ajax Cape Town

Senior career*
Years	Team	Apps	(Gls)
2005–2015	Ajax Cape Town	173	(2)
2015–2018	Bidvest Wits	53	(0)
2018–2022	Maritzburg United	82	(0)
2022–	Cape Town Spurs	39	(0)

International career^{‡}
2008–2012	South Africa	2	(0)
- * Club domestic league appearances and goals as of 15 June 2024 ‡ National team caps and goals as of 10 November 2022

Nazeer Allie (born 23 May 1985) is a South African soccer player who plays as a defender for Premier Soccer League club Cape Town Spurs and the South African national team. He played for Ajax Cape Town early in his career.
