= Ally =

An ally is a member of an alliance.

Ally may also refer to:

== Places ==
- Ally, Cantal, France, a commune
- Ally, Haute-Loire, France, a commune
- Ally, County Tyrone, Northern Ireland, a townland

== Arts and entertainment ==
- Ally (film), an upcoming film by Bong Joon Ho
- Ally (novel), a 2007 science fiction novel by Karen Traviss
- Ally (TV series), a 1999 American television sitcom and a spin-off of Ally McBeal
- Ally, stage name of Thai singer Achiraya Nitibhon

== Enterprises ==
- Ally Fashion, an Australian women's fashion retailer
- Ally Financial, a bank holding company, formerly known as General Motors Acceptance Corporation (GMAC)

== Technology ==
- Asus ROG Ally, a handheld gaming computer by Asus, released in 2023
- ROG Xbox Ally, a handheld gaming computer by Asus and Microsoft, released in 2025

== Other uses ==
- Ally (name), including a list of people and fictional characters
- A term used for another species belonging to the same biological family
- Also used in certain contexts to refer to a Straight ally, a non-LGBTQ person who supports LGBTQ rights and movements

== See also ==
- Alley
- Aly (disambiguation)
- Ali (disambiguation)
- Alli (disambiguation)
- Allie (disambiguation)
- Allies (disambiguation)
