= Alfred Young Allee =

Alfred Young Allee (September 14, 1905 – January 13, 1987) was an American law enforcement officer and member of the Texas Ranger Division. He was the grandson of Alfred Allee, who became sheriff of Karnes County, Texas, in 1892. Born in La Salle County, Texas, he served as a game warden, deputy sheriff, and Texas Ranger over the course of his career.

== Early life and career ==
Allee was born in La Salle County, Texas. In 1926, he was a game warden in Zavala County, Texas. In 1927, he became a deputy sheriff in Zavala County.

== Texas Ranger service ==
In 1931, Allee joined the Texas Rangers and served in Captain Light Townsend's Company C. In 1933, he resigned after the election of Governor Miriam "Ma" Ferguson and became a deputy sheriff in Beeville, Texas. He rejoined the Texas Rangers in 1935 after the election of Governor James V. Allred.

Allee ultimately served for 37 years as a Texas Ranger.

== Role in farmworker unrest and litigation ==
In 1966, farm workers in Texas went on strike to protest low wages and working conditions. Ranch owners called in the Texas Rangers, and Allee, then a captain, was involved in the response. The Rangers' conduct during the dispute later became the subject of litigation brought by farm workers, with Allee named as the lead defendant. The case was eventually decided by the Supreme Court of the United States as Allee v. Medrano (1974).

Delivering the court's decision, Justice William O. Douglas told of a "violent and brutal" arrest led by Allee.

== Legacy ==
In July 2012, Allee's gun was featured on the first episode of America's Lost Treasures. According to National Geographic, it was selected in recognition of "the importance of the artifact in American history" and was to be included in a special exhibit at the National Geographic Museum in Washington, D.C., in 2013.
