= Alley (given name) =

Alley is a unisex given name. Notable people with the name include:

== Male ==
- Alley Broussard (born 1983), American football player

== Female ==
- Alley Baggett (born 1973), American glamour model
- Alley Mills (born 1951), American actress
