= Allie Lewis Clapp =

American chef and media personality

Allison Gimbel Lewis Clapp is an American chef, television and radio personality, and food writer. She is the former food editor for Bon Appétit magazine and is known for her regular television appearances as a segment host and cook on the PBS program Everyday Food.

== Education and career ==
Clapp graduated from Phillips Exeter Academy and earned a Bachelor of Arts degree in economics from Yale University. She then earned her Grand Diplôme at Le Cordon Bleu in Paris. She had previously spent the summer before her senior year in college at Tante Marie's Cooking School in San Francisco, which fostered her passion for food. While in Paris, she worked as a trainee at Restaurant Arpège, Alain Passard's Michelin 3-star restaurant.

After working for Bobby Flay's New York restaurants, Mesa Grill and Bolo, where she served as food and beverage director, Clapp was an event coordinator at Tentation Special Events Catering.

Starting in 2002, Clapp was deputy food editor for Everyday Food magazine, a Martha Stewart Living Omnimedia publication, which launched her foray into television through its companion TV show. Clapp also managed the test kitchen for Everyday Food, where her duties included recipe development and testing. She also wrote a monthly column, "How-To With Allie," where she offered instruction on basic cooking techniques. She was a contributor at its sister publication, Blueprint, and made frequent appearances on Martha Stewart's talk show, Martha, and NBC's The Today Show. Clapp also hosted a daily radio segment called "Everyday Dinners" on Sirius Satellite Radio's Martha Stewart Living Radio, where she offered time-saving ideas for weeknight meals. Her last season of the PBS show was in 2009.

From 2008 to 2012, Clapp was food director for Real Simple magazine, where she oversaw the food section, which was nominated for James Beard, IACP, and ASME awards.

Clapp was named in October 2012 to food editor at Bon Appétit, where she shaped the magazine's monthly food content and oversaw the brand's food-related content across multimedia platforms. She left in June 2014, with her role being succeeded by Carla Lalli Music.

== Personal life ==
Clapp is the daughter of Patricia G. Lewis and Dr. Randall J. Lewis of Bethesda, Maryland. Her father, an orthopedic surgeon, is a clinical professor at George Washington University medical school. Her mother, an attorney, is a partner in Caplin & Drysdale, a Washington, D.C., law firm. Her great-great-grandfather was Adam Gimbel, the founder of the department store chain that bore his name and the operator of other stores, including Saks Fifth Avenue.

In October 2007, she married Andrew Todd Clapp, a partner in Catalyst Investors, an investment firm in New York City. They live in Manhattan's Greenwich Village.
