= Allie McNab =

Jamaican football manager

Personal information
- Full name: Aldrick McNab
- Place of birth: Jamaica

Managerial career
- Years: Team
- Jamaica

Aldrick McNab is a Jamaican football manager and former player.

== Early life ==
McNab grew up near Cornwall College in Jamaica.

== Career ==
McNab played for the St. Louis Stars in 1967. He later played for Jamaican side Boys' Town, helping the club win the league in 1983–84.

He was inducted into the Caribbean Sports Hall of Fame as a member of the class of 2012.

== Personal life ==
McNab worked as a sportscaster with the Jamaica Broadcasting Corporation.
