= David Allee =

American photographer

David S. Allee
- Born: 1969 (age 56–57)
- Education: BA Cornell University; MFA School of Visual Arts
- Known for: architectural photography
- Website: www.davidallee.com

David S. Allee (born 1969) is an American artist and photographer whose work centers on the built environment, urban landscapes, and the interaction between architecture and light. Allee has produced projects such as White Nights, Cross Lands, Chasing Firefly, Harlem Valley Psychiatric Center, Domino Sugar Refinery, and Frame of View.

== Education ==
Allee received an undergraduate degree in economics and government from Cornell University in 1991, and his MFA in photography from the School of Visual Arts (2001). He began his career as an urban planner before switching to photography.

== Photography ==
Allee's photographs are focused on the built environment, and on architecture in particular. He is well known for using found available light at night in his work, beginning with White Nights (2000–03) and followed by Cross Lands and, most recently, Chasing Firefly. He has also exhibited and published series of images of the abandoned Harlem Valley Psychiatric Center (2006–10), defunct Domino Sugar Refinery in Brooklyn (2013–14) and more recently, Frame of View (2003–19). In 2020, he used a tilt-shift lens to control perspective while taking frontal photographs of Broadway theatres closed due to the coronavirus pandemic.

== Exhibitions ==
=== Solo exhibitions ===
- David S. Allee, Knoxville Museum of Art, 2004
- Dark Day, Morgan Lehman Gallery, New York City, 2011
- Frame of View, Morgan Lehman Gallery, New York City, 2013

=== Group exhibitions ===
- Selections from the Bronx Museum Permanent Collection, Bronx Museum of the Arts, New York, 2014
- Behind the Wheel, Santa Barbara Museum of Art, Santa Barbara, CA, 2012

== Collections ==
- Bronx Museum of the Arts
- Santa Barbara Museum of Art
- Knoxville Museum of Art
