= Allie's Donuts =

Doughnut shop in North Kingstown, Rhode Island, U.S.

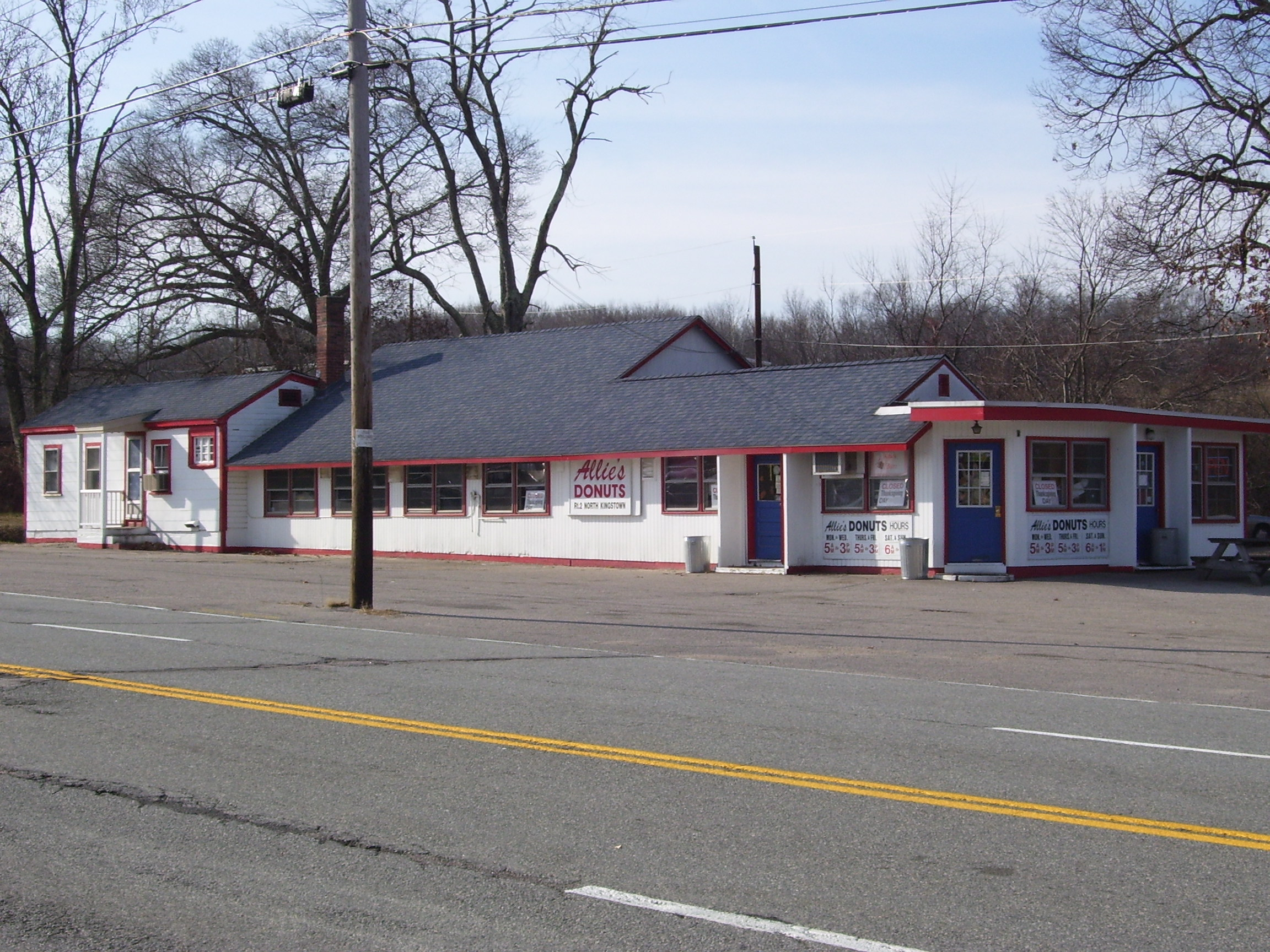
- Allie's Donuts in 2008
- Interactive map of Allie's Donuts

Restaurant information
- Established: June 1, 1968; 58 years ago
- Food type: Doughnuts, crullers, cinnamon rolls, and coffee
- Location: 3661 Quaker Lane, North Kingstown, Rhode Island, 02852, United States
- Coordinates: 41°35′54″N 71°29′48.5″W
- Website: Official Facebook page

Allie's Donuts is a doughnut shop in North Kingstown, Rhode Island, United States. Established in 1968 by Frederick Alvin "Allie" Briggs, the store has been listed as one of the best doughnut shops in the country by Saveur in 2008 and by Thrillist in 2016. Considered a landmark in Rhode Island, Allie's Donuts is also popular amongst residents from nearby states, receiving many customers travelling from Connecticut and Massachusetts to visit the store.

== History ==
On June 1, 1968, Frederick Alvin "Allie" Briggs opened Allie's Hand-Cut Do-nut Shop in a former sub sandwich shop along Route 2 with about $40 on hand and a $7,000 debt. A dairy farmer from Point Judith, Briggs had earned 10 years of experience in making and selling doughnuts while working at a shop in Wakefield. On the opening day of the store, Briggs made a total of $38, selling nearly 100 dozen doughnuts at ¢39 each.

In 1969, Briggs' son Ricky was killed by a drunk driver while delivering doughnuts for the business alongside his cousin. Devastated by the incident, Briggs nearly shut down his business. However, with support from his family and friends, he was encouraged to keep the shop open.

Adjacent to the doughnut shop, Briggs opened Allie's Tack Shop in 1978, which is still operating as Allie's Feed, Farm & Pet as of 2023.

By the 1980s, Allie's Donuts was selling up to 800 dozen doughnuts a day. In 1986, the business was handed down to Briggs' eldest daughter, Anne Briggs Drescher, and her husband. Walter "Bud" Drescher. Two years later in December 1988, the American hospitality company Marriott Corporation threatened a lawsuit against the Dreschers for attempting to trademark "Allie's Donuts" in order to prepare for opening their business to franchising. The Marriott Corporation had previously applied a trademark for "Allie's" and similar names, as the company had established a brand of restaurants named for the co-founder Alice Marriott within their hotels under the name. No further legal action proceeded only one franchised Allie's Donuts location opened, operating for just 5 months in 1992 in Middletown.

Multiple times between 2002 and 2012, the Dreschers put Allie's Donuts up for sale as they declared that they were ready to retire. In 2014 through their Facebook page, they reassured that Allie's Donuts would continue to be a family-run business. Ownership of the business was eventually passed down to their son Matt Drescher, who put the business through controversy in 2020 after discontinuing the police and military discount during the George Floyd protests in June. Later in August, the company backed down on these changes, and instead began offering free half-dozens for customers to give to the local police departments, and handing out free T-shirts to customers who photographed themselves alongside the recipient officers. Matt Drescher announced that he would be stepping down from his chief operating officer position at Allie's Donuts in late 2021 while retaining a small ownership stake.

Elements of how the business is operated to the current day are carried over from the early years of the business; the store only accepts cash payments, and its opening hours remain based on Briggs' schedule as a Babe Ruth League baseball coach.

== Doughnuts, pastries, and beverages ==
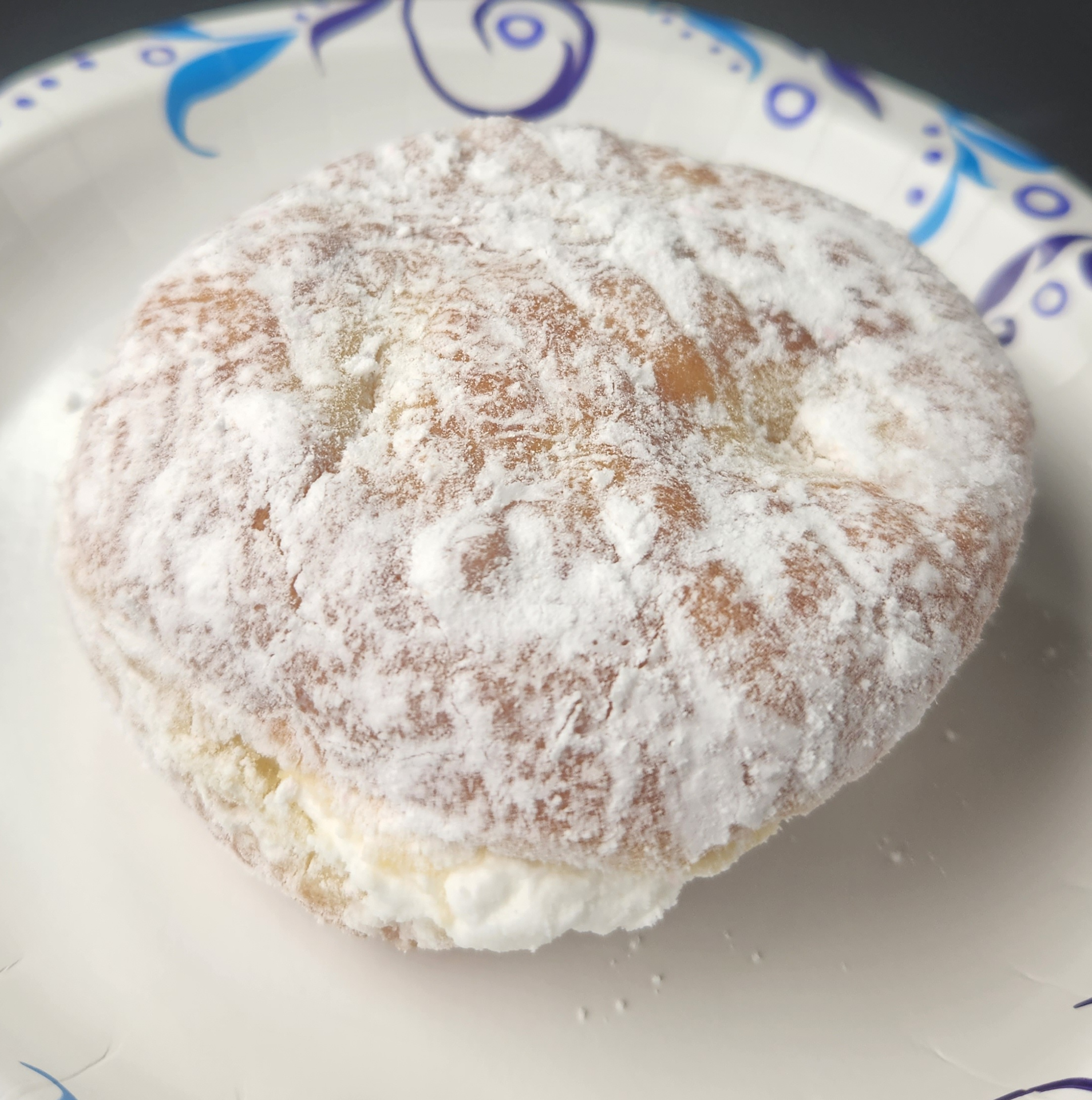
A vanilla frosting-filled doughnut from Allie's Donuts

On the standard menu, Allie's Donuts currently offers 32 different donuts, two crullers, and a cinnamon roll, as well as multiple iced and hot beverages. A specialty item sold by the business is a "donut cake", a 10-inch doughnut offered in various designs decorated with frosting and sprinkles resemblant of a traditional birthday cake. The inspiration for selling it came from when Briggs' young son, Mike, out of boredom, traced along a dinner plate into freshly-made dough to create an unusually large doughnut. Skeptical, Briggs inserted the dough into a fryer, but its frying was successful, and the store eventually began topping the large donuts with frosting and sprinkles like a typical sprinkled-doughnut and selling them to customers at their request. Currently, Allie's Donuts has limited its production of donut cakes to 80 per day, and they are often ordered ahead of time for special occasions and events.

In 2015, Narragansett Beer collaborated with Allie's Donuts to introduce a double chocolate doughnut-flavored porter. It was sold throughout most of the East Coast.
