= Allie White =

American football player (1915–1996)

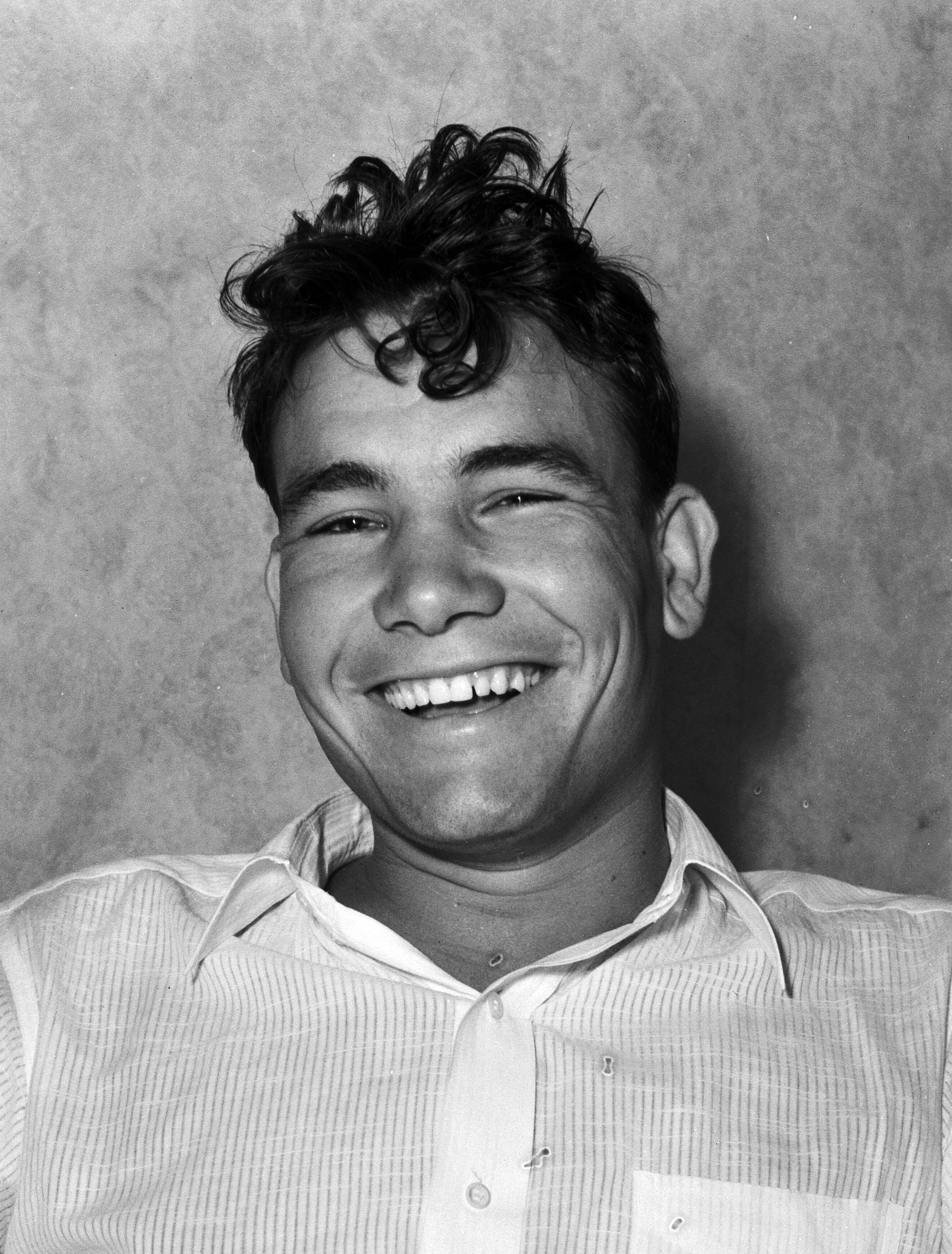
- White in 1935

No. 21
- Positions: Guard, tackle

Personal information
- Born: March 23, 1915; Crosby, Texas, U.S.
- Died: October 21, 1996 (aged 81); Fort Worth, Texas, U.S.
- Listed height: 5 ft 11 in (1.80 m)
- Listed weight: 212 lb (96 kg)

Career information
- High school: Masonic Home (Fort Worth)
- College: TCU
- NFL draft: 1939: 13th round, 114th overall pick

Career history
- Philadelphia Eagles (1939)

Awards and highlights
- National champion (1938); Second-team All-SWC (1938)

Career NFL statistics
- Games played: 7
- Stats at Pro Football Reference

Thomas Allison White (March 23, 1915 – October 21, 1996) was an American professional football guard and tackle who played one season with the Philadelphia Eagles of the National Football League (NFL). He was selected by the Eagles in the 13th round of the 1939 NFL draft after playing college football at Texas Christian University (TCU).

== Early life and college ==
Thomas Allison White was born on March 23, 1915, in Crosby, Texas. He attended Masonic Home High School in Fort Worth, Texas. White was the first player in Texas high school football history to be voted all state three times in high school, earning the honors from 1932 to 1934. He was also a two-time All-Southern selection, two-year team captain, and four-year letterman. He was a part of two undefeated teams at Masonic Home as well. White was inducted into the Texas High School Football Hall of Fame in 1987.

White was a member of the TCU Horned Frogs football team from 1935 to 1938, and a three-year letterman from 1936 to 1938. His senior year in 1938, the Horned Frogs were the consensus national champions with an 11–0 record and White was named Associated Press second-team All-Southwest Conference. He was also voted the team's “Best All-Around Player” in 1938. While at TCU, he played with both Sammy Baugh and Davey O’Brien. He was inducted into the TCU Lettermen's Association Hall of Fame in 1970.

== Professional career ==
White was selected by the Philadelphia Eagles in the 13th round, with the 114th overall pick, of the 1939 NFL draft. He played in seven games for the Eagles during the 1939 season as a tackle/guard. He became a free agent in 1940.

== Post-playing career ==
Later, White coached for TCU, and his most prized recruit and player was Bob Lilly. He also served in the United States Navy and played for the Georgia Pre-Flight Skycrackers and Jacksonville Naval Air Station Fliers.

He died on October 21, 1996, in Fort Worth.
