= William Allee =

American politician

William S. Allee

Member of the Missouri Senate from the 27th district

Personal details
- Born: January 20, 1852 Moniteau County, Missouri, U.S.
- Died: October 9, 1916 (aged 64) Kansas City, Missouri, U.S.
- Party: Democratic
- Spouse: Laura C. Huston
- Education: Rush Medical College of Chicago
- Occupation: politician, surgeon, bank president

William S. Allee (January 20, 1852 – October 9, 1916) was an American politician from Olean, Missouri, who served in the Missouri Senate. He was elected in the general elections of 1909 and 1915.
