= Hassan Aly =

Malagasy politician

Hassan Aly is a Malagasy politician. A member of the National Assembly of Madagascar, he was elected as a member of the Tiako I Madagasikara party in the 2007 Malagasy parliamentary elections. He represents the constituency of Nosy Be.

He was named chief of the Diana Region on 3 February 2009 and had to ceed his chair as a deputy to his substitute Marie Eliette Dona James. He occupied that post only for 2 months.
