= Alfred Allee =

American sheriff (1855–1896)

Alfred Y. Allee
- Born: 1855; DeWitt County, Texas; USA
- Died: 1896 (aged c. 41); Laredo; Webb County, Texas
- Cause of death: Barroom stabbing
- Occupations: Law enforcement officer Deputy sheriff in Karnes and Frio counties
- Children: Alfred Young Allee

Alfred Y. Allee (1855 in DeWitt County, Texas – 1896 in Laredo, Texas, 1896) was an American lawman prominent in Texas in the late 19th century, with a reputation for quick and casual violence and for shooting prisoners after they had surrendered.

In 1882, Allee became deputy sheriff of Karnes County south of San Antonio. That same year, he shot and killed a robbery suspect under questionable circumstances; it was claimed that Allee was settling an old score. He was charged, but not convicted, of the man's murder.

While deputy sheriff of Frio County, Allee became involved in a disagreement with another deputy about which man was the faster draw. Packing two six-guns, Allee shot the man eight times, killing him instantly. He was again acquitted of the charge of murder when witnesses testified that the other deputy had drawn his gun first, and Allee only defended himself.

It must be said, however, that despite his penchant for shooting seemingly defenseless targets, Allee was not himself a coward. In September 1888, Allee was assigned to hunt down Brack Cornett, a train and bank robber, whom he tracked to the town of Frio and shot dead after a running gun battle on horseback.

In 1896, Allee was stabbed to death in a barroom brawl in Laredo in Webb County in south Texas.

Allee's grandson (Alfred Young Allee) was a notable Texas Ranger for thirty-seven years.
