= Thomas William Allies =

English historian (1813–1903)

Thomas William Allies (12 February 1813 – 17 June 1903) was an English historical writer specializing in religious subjects. He was one of the Anglican churchmen who joined the Roman Catholic Church in the early period of the Oxford Movement.

== Life ==
Allies was born at Midsomer Norton in Somerset and briefly educated at Bristol Grammar School and then at Eton College, where he was the first winner of the Newcastle Scholarship in 1829, and at Wadham College, Oxford, of which he became a fellow in 1833.

In the late 1830s, Allies became a Tractarian supporter, influenced by William Dodsworth. In 1840 Bishop Blomfield of London appointed him his examining chaplain and presented him to the rectory of Launton, Oxfordshire, which he resigned in 1850 on becoming a Roman Catholic. Allies was appointed secretary to the Catholic Poor School Committee in 1853, a position which he occupied till 1890. Allies raised £50,000 to assist Catholic schools with meeting the needs of education acts.

Allies was a strong influence on his family and after 1883 his daughter Mary was left at home. Inspired by her father she devoted her time to writing about the lives of Catholic saints. He died in London in 1903 and he was buried beside his wife who had died the year before.

== Works ==
His major work was The Formation of Christendom (London, 8 vols., 1865–1895). His other writings included Allies, Thomas William (1871). St. Peter, His Name and His Office, as Set Forth in Holy Scripture. (1852); Allies, Thomas William (1850). The See of St. Peter. (1850); Per Crucem ad Lucem (2 vols., 1879). They went through many editions and were translated into several languages.
