= Mary Allies =

English Catholic writer and historian

Mary Helen Agnes Allies
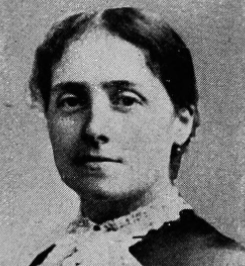
- Born: 2 February 1852; Henley-in-Arden, Warwickshire, England
- Died: 27 January 1927 (aged 74); St John's Wood, England
- Occupation: writer
- Writing career
- Subject: Roman Catholic saints

Mary Helen Agnes Allies (2 February 1852 – 27 January 1927) was an English Catholic historian, writer and translator.

== Life ==
Allies was born on 2 February 1852. She was the eldest daughter of Thomas William Allies and Eliza (born Hall) Allies. Her father had been a fellow at Oxford and he had risen to be the chaplain to the Bishop of London. He had however made a life-changing move to Roman Catholicism in 1850.

Her father was secretary of the Catholic Poor School Committee. She had five siblings and they lived in St John's Wood in London. The family moved to Portman Square and Mary boarded at Holy Child College, a Catholic school in St Leonards-on-Sea operated by the Society of the Holy Child Jesus (later merged into their Mayfield school), and subsequently the Visitation Convent Paris. Allies gave a lot of respect to her father and in time she would write his biography. She served as his secretary from 1872 to 1890. She said that she fed "on the marrow of his mind" when she was the only child living at home. Her first work, The Life of Pius VII, was published in 1875. It was well researched, but strongly pro-Catholic. The book looked at a supreme pope in conflict with the Napoleonic French state. Pius VII's conflict included him being arrested. Allies' biography was based on sources in four languages. This, and the shorter version published in 1897, as of 2004 was the only available biography of Pius VII in English and is therefore considered a standard work.

== Works ==
Her next work, Three Catholic Reformers (1876) was considered too pious and uncritical of her subjects. She wrote about the Dominican friar Saint Vincent Ferrier, Saint Bernardino of Siena and the "Soldier Saint" John of Capistrano.

- Leaves from St. Augustine (1886) -taken from the works Saint Augustine
- Leaves from St. John Chrysostom (1887)
- Letters of St. Augustine (1889)
- History of the Church of England, 2 vols. (1892-1897) -a partisan view of the Anglican church before 1603.
- Thomas William Allies, Burns Oates and Washbourne Limited, 1924.

She translated an extract of John of Damascus's De fide Orthoxa in 1898. When her mother died in 1902 and her father the following year she occupied herself writing a biography of her father, writing articles for journals such as Catholic World and Catholic quarterly'; and caring for her brother's children. She died at her home in St John's Wood in 1927.
