= Brisbane Pride Festival =

Annual LGBT event in Brisbane, Australia

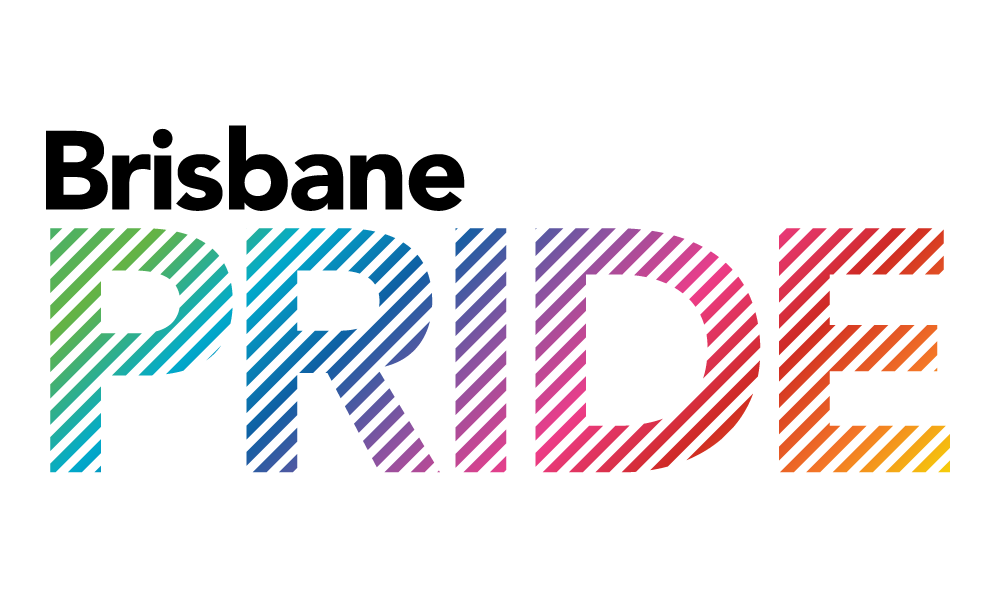
- Begins: 1990
- Locations: Brisbane, Queensland, Australia
- Inaugurated: 1990
- Website: www.brisbanepride.org.au

Brisbane Pride Festival is an annual event in Brisbane, Queensland, Australia, which celebrates queer culture. It started in 1990.

Fair Day celebrations occur at Musgrave Park, South Brisbane, and previously for years in New Farm Park.

== History ==
The first event was held as a rally and gay pride march through the streets of Brisbane, ending with a small gathering at Musgrave Park, South Brisbane.

For thirteen years the Festival was run by a collective and in 2002 was incorporated. The Festival is a celebration of lesbian, gay, bisexual and transgender, Intersex, Queer culture through the arts, sporting, community and political events. The Pride Festival aims to bring lesbian, gay, bisexual and transgender people of Brisbane together. It is understood that such public visibility, promotes acceptance of homosexuality within the wider community.

In 2015, members of the Queensland Police Service participated in the march for the first time. The organising committee agreed to prohibit police officers from marching in uniform for the October 2021 Festival march, 'in the wake of ongoing allegations of homophobic, racist and sexist conduct' of the Service.

The 2018 festival coincided with the Brisbane Festival. It featured a civic celebration of same-sex marriage in Bowen Hills for eight couples followed by a street party.

In 2022 the Fair Day moved back to Musgrave Park, South Brisbane, after many years at New Farm Park.

== Presidents ==
Scott Hampson and Deeje Hancock preceded Peter Black who became Brisbane Pride President in 2016. In 2021, Bec Johnson was president of the organising committee. Johnson was awarded an Order of Australia in the 2023 Australia Day Honours, for service to the Indigenous and LGBTQI communities, recognising her long contributions to the Pride movement and advocacy. James McCarthy is currently the President of Brisbane Pride Inc.

== See also ==
- LGBT rights in Queensland
- List of LGBT events
- List of festivals in Brisbane
- List of festivals in Australia
