= Charles Allee =

Australian cricketer

Personal information
- Born: 10 February 1848; Melbourne, Colony of New South Wales
- Died: 7 June 1896 (aged 48); Melbourne, Australia

Domestic team information
- Years: Team
- 1873-1878: Victoria
- Source: Cricinfo, 6 June 2015

Charles Allee (10 February 1848 – 7 June 1896) was an Australian cricketer. He played six first-class cricket matches for Victoria between 1873 and 1878. He was also a founder of East Melbourne Cricket Club.

== See also ==
- List of Victoria first-class cricketers
