= Allied forces =

Allied forces or Allied force may refer to:

== Military ==
- Allies of World War II, the alliance that opposed the Axis powers
- Allied forces (World War I), the alliance that opposed the Central Powers
- Allied Forces Baltic Approaches, a command of NATO active from 1962 to 2002
- Allied Forces North Norway, a command of NATO active from 1952 to 1994
- Allied Forces Northern Europe, a command of NATO active from 1952 to 1994
- Allied Forces Mediterranean, a command of NATO active from 1952 to 1967
- Operation Allied Force or NATO bombing of Yugoslavia

== Other uses ==
- Allied Forces (album), 1981 studio album by Triumph
- Falcon 4.0: Allied Force, a flight simulator video game

== See also ==
- Alliance
- Allied (disambiguation)
- Allied Powers (disambiguation)
