= Allied Powers =

Allied powers are nations that have joined in an alliance. More specifically, the term may refer to:

- Allies of World War I, member nations of the World War I alliance who fought against the Central Powers
- Allies of World War II, member nations of the World War II alliance who fought against the Axis Powers
- Allied Powers (Maritime Courts) Act 1941 (C.21) of the Parliament of the United Kingdom
- Allied Powers (horse), an Irish racehorse
- The Allied Powers (professional wrestling), a short-lived tag team

== See also ==
- Allied (disambiguation)
- Allied Forces (disambiguation)
