= Value conversion =

Value conversion is the act of converting one type of value or financial instrument into another type of negotiable value. In the securities profession the definition of conversion value is very narrowly defined as the positive difference between the market price of a convertible security and the price at which it is convertible. The larger topic of :Value conversion" is relevant to the managing of intangible assets or intellectual capital. It refers to the act of transforming financial to non-financial value or an intangible asset into a financial asset. Intangible asset management has largely focused on valuation of intangible assets like trying to assign a financial value to an asset such as reputation. The theme of value conversion also runs through social exchange theory and more classical views of exchange value.
