= Alagyaz (disambiguation) =

Alagyaz may refer to:

- Alagyaz, Armenia
- Aragats, Talin, Armenia
- Artabuynk, Armenia
- Mount Aragats, Armenia
- Yeghegis, Armenia

== See also ==
- Aragats (disambiguation)
