= Alagez =

Alagez may refer to:

- Alagyaz, town in Armenia
- Aragats, Talin, town in Armenia
- Russian ship Alagez, a Russian ship
