= Aragats (disambiguation) =

Aragats may refer to:

- Mount Aragats, in Armenia
- Aragats, Aragatsotn, Armenia
- Aragats, Armavir, Armenia
- Aragatsavan, Armenia
- Aragats BT, Armenian basketball team

== See also ==
- Alagyaz (disambiguation)
