= Alagëz =

Alagëz may refer to:

- Alagyaz, Armenia
- Aragats, Talin, Armenia
