= Stella Grigoryan =

Armenian artist, sculptor and teacher

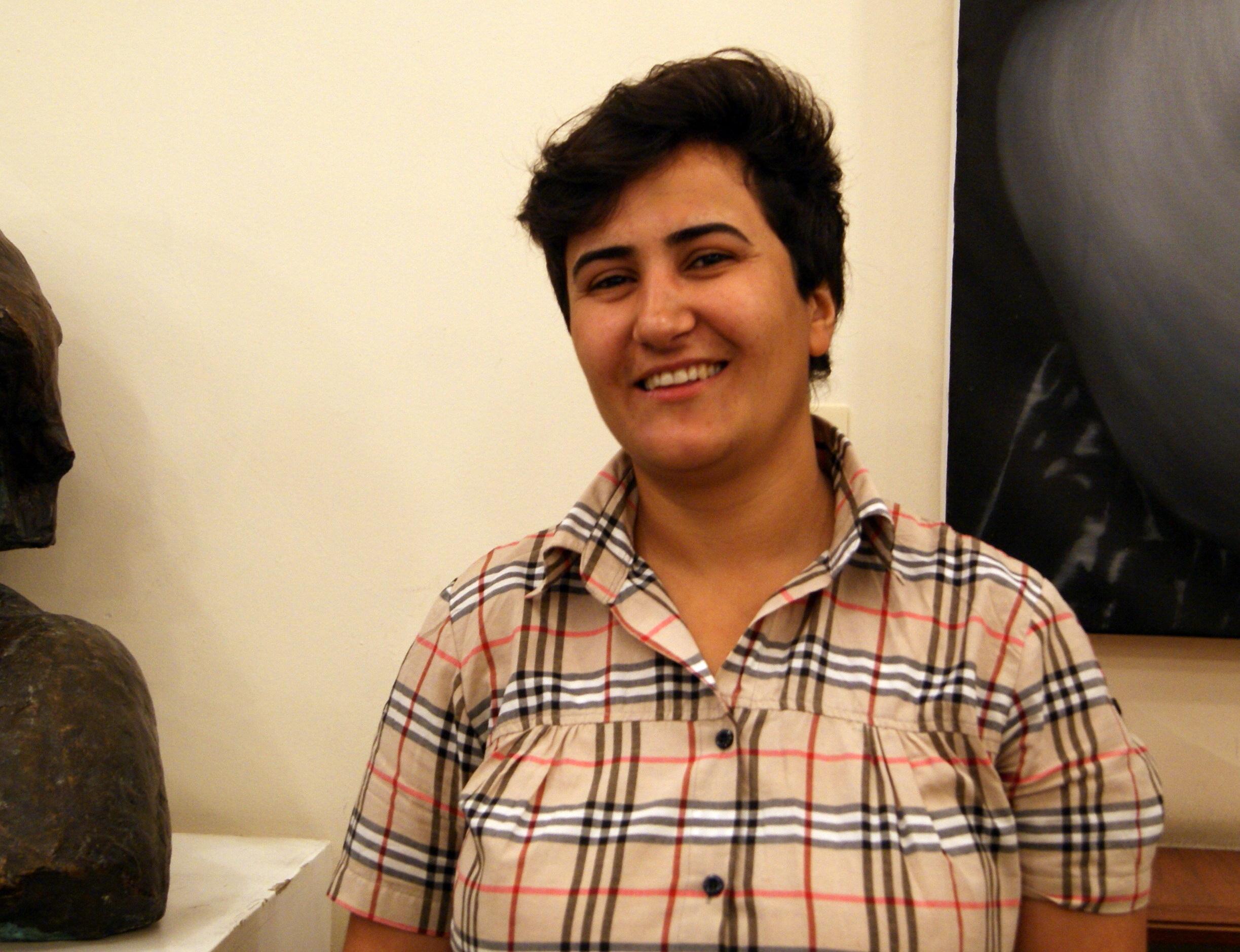
- Born: Stella Grigoryan; November 4, 1989 (age 36); Aragatsavan, Armenia
- Known for: sculptures

Stella Grigoryan (Armenian: Ստելլա Գրիգորյան, born on November 4, 1989, in Aragatsavan) is an Armenian artist, sculptor, and teacher.

== Career ==
Stella Grigoryan was born in 1989 in Aragatsavan, Aragatsotn Province of Armenia. From 2010-2014 she studied at the sculpture department of Yerevan State Academy of Fine Arts. She got her master's degree from State Pedagogical University after Kh. Abovyan. Since 2016 Stella teaches at the "Mughdusyan" Art Center.

== Exhibitions ==
- Youth competition in 2013
- "Bronze and volume", 2013
- Exhibition-competition dedicated to the Feast of St. Sargis, 2014
- Republican Sculpture Exhibition, 2014
- Exhibition dedicated to Armenian Genocide- «After 100 years», 2015

== Awards ==
- St. Sargis Award, 2015
- St. Sargis Award, 2016
- Art Fest 2016 international youth festival, for best sculptural work
- Armenian Genocide 100th anniversary of "The past in present" contest-winning exhibition

== Gallery ==
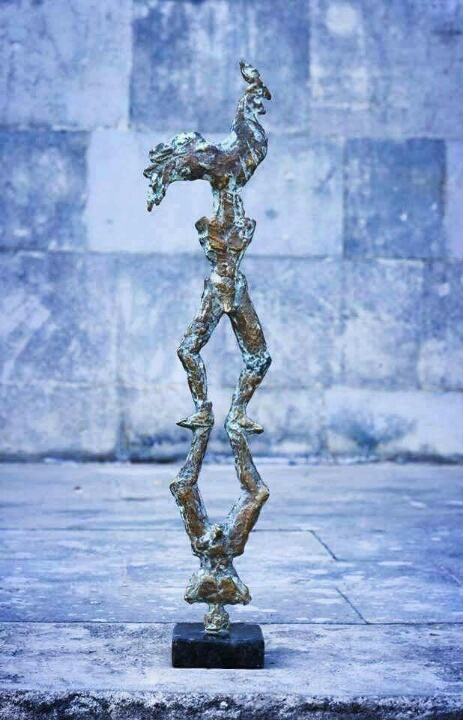
French morning series, 2012

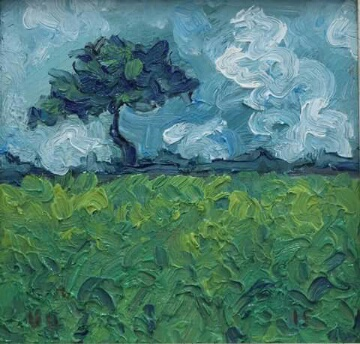
Solo, 2015

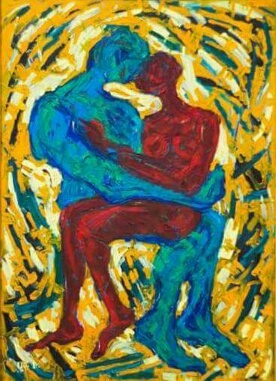
Adam and Lilith, 2015

== See also ==
- List of Armenian artists
- List of Armenians
- Culture of Armenia
