= Yeghegis =

Yeghegis Եղեգիս
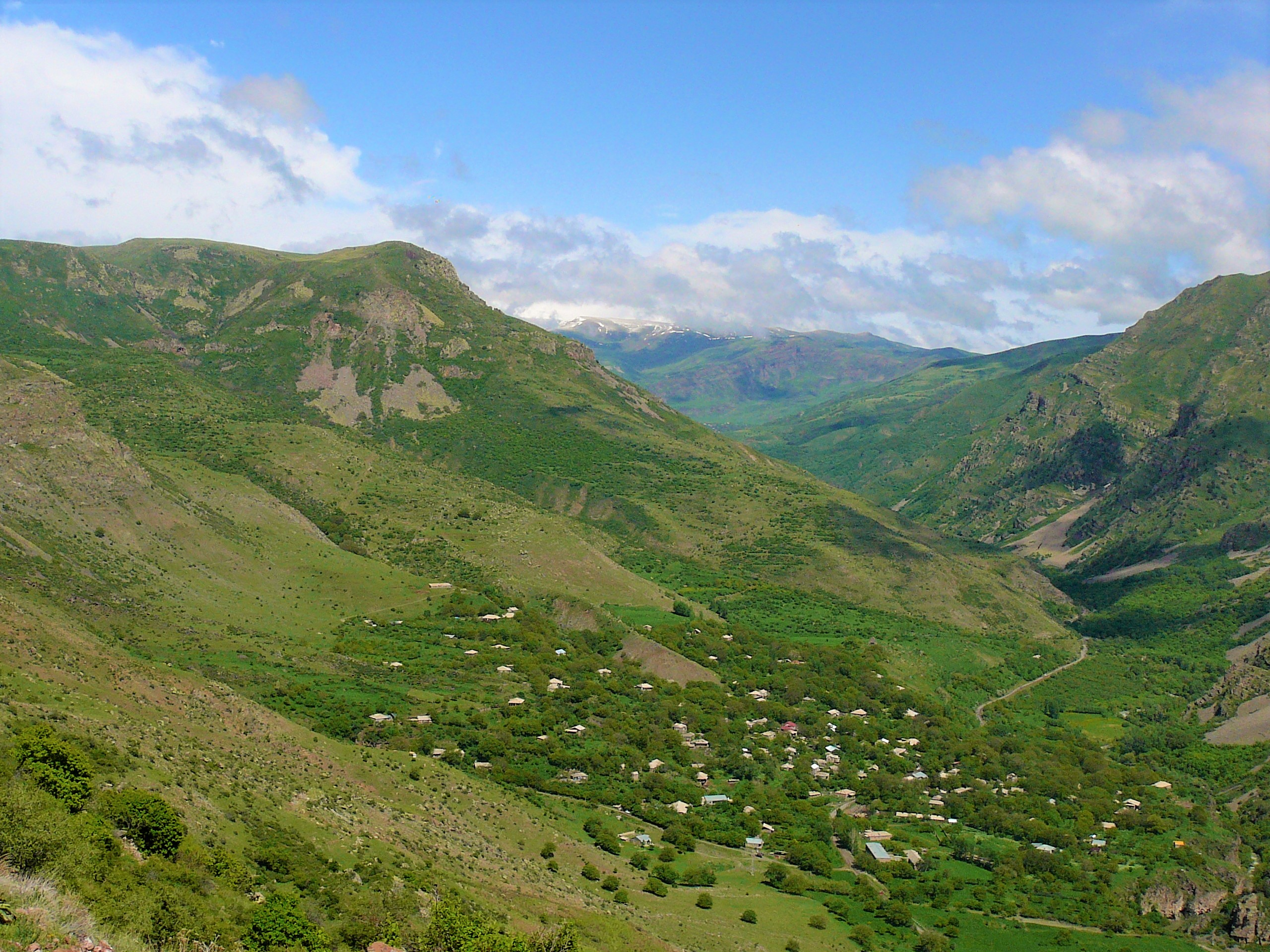

- Location within Armenia Location within Vayots Dzor
- Coordinates: 39°52′20″N 45°21′35″E
- Country: Armenia
- Province: Vayots Dzor
- Municipality: Yeghegis

Population (2011)
  - Total: 369
- Time zone: UTC+4 (AMT)

Yeghegis (Armenian: Եղեգիս) is a village in the Yeghegis Municipality of the Vayots Dzor Province in Armenia. It has a rich historical past, with the medieval Zorats Church, the Tsakhats Kar Monastery and the Smbataberd fortress being located in the vicinity of Yeghegis, as well as a Jewish cemetery from the 13th century.

== Toponymy ==
The name Yeghegis originated from the Armenian word yeghegn which means reed. The village was also previously known as Alagyaz and Erdapin.

== History ==
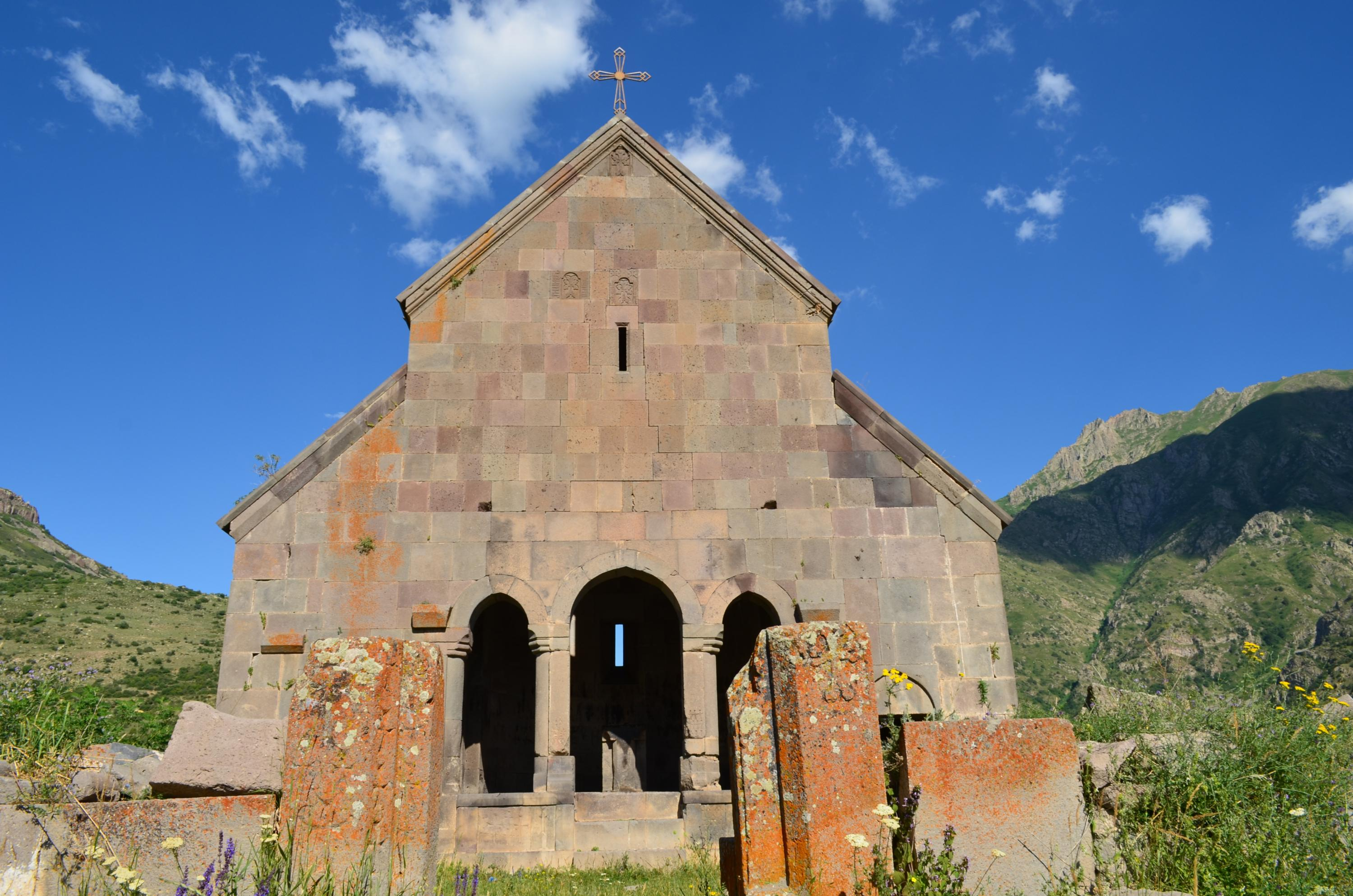
Zorats Church, dedicated in 1303 (also known as St. Stepanos Church)

Yeghegis was a prominent economic and political centre during the Middle Ages, being the seat of the Orbelian Dynasty in the 13th and 14th centuries, which ruled most of Zangezur. However, after the incursion of the armies of Timur, as well as Turkmen and Persian forces, Orbelian rule ended by the 15th century. After numerous earthquakes ruined Yeghegis and with the local Armenian population being forcibly exiled into Persia, the village was abandoned. Later the village was populated by Turkish-speaking residents. Following the Sumgait pogrom in 1988, Armenian refugees deported from Azerbaijan settled in the village.

Refugees from Sumgait settled in the village in 1988.

=== Zorats Church ===
Zorats Church (Armenian: Զորաց եկեղեցի, romanized: Zorats Yekeghetsi, lit. 'Soldier Church') is a unique Armenian church on a hill close to Yeghegis. It was dedicated in 1303 by archbishop Stepanos, during a period in which Armenia was a Mongol vassal state. The church was designed so that cavalry could receive the sacraments without getting off their horses.

=== Jewish cemetery ===
There is a Jewish cemetery in Yeghegis that dates from the period between the 13th and 14th centuries, with the oldest tombstone in the cemetery having been dated to be from 1266 AD and the most recent one having been dated to be from 1346 AD. The Jewish community living in Yeghegis likely had an Iranian origin. The lost community was rediscovered by Bishop Abraham Mkrtchyan, who, together with his brother, stumbled across the place while making a camp for some orphans from the First Nagorno-Karabakh War. The cemetery consisted of 64 different gravestones that are believed to have come from an isolated community from the Jewish communities of Iran and the Caucasus.

== Gallery ==
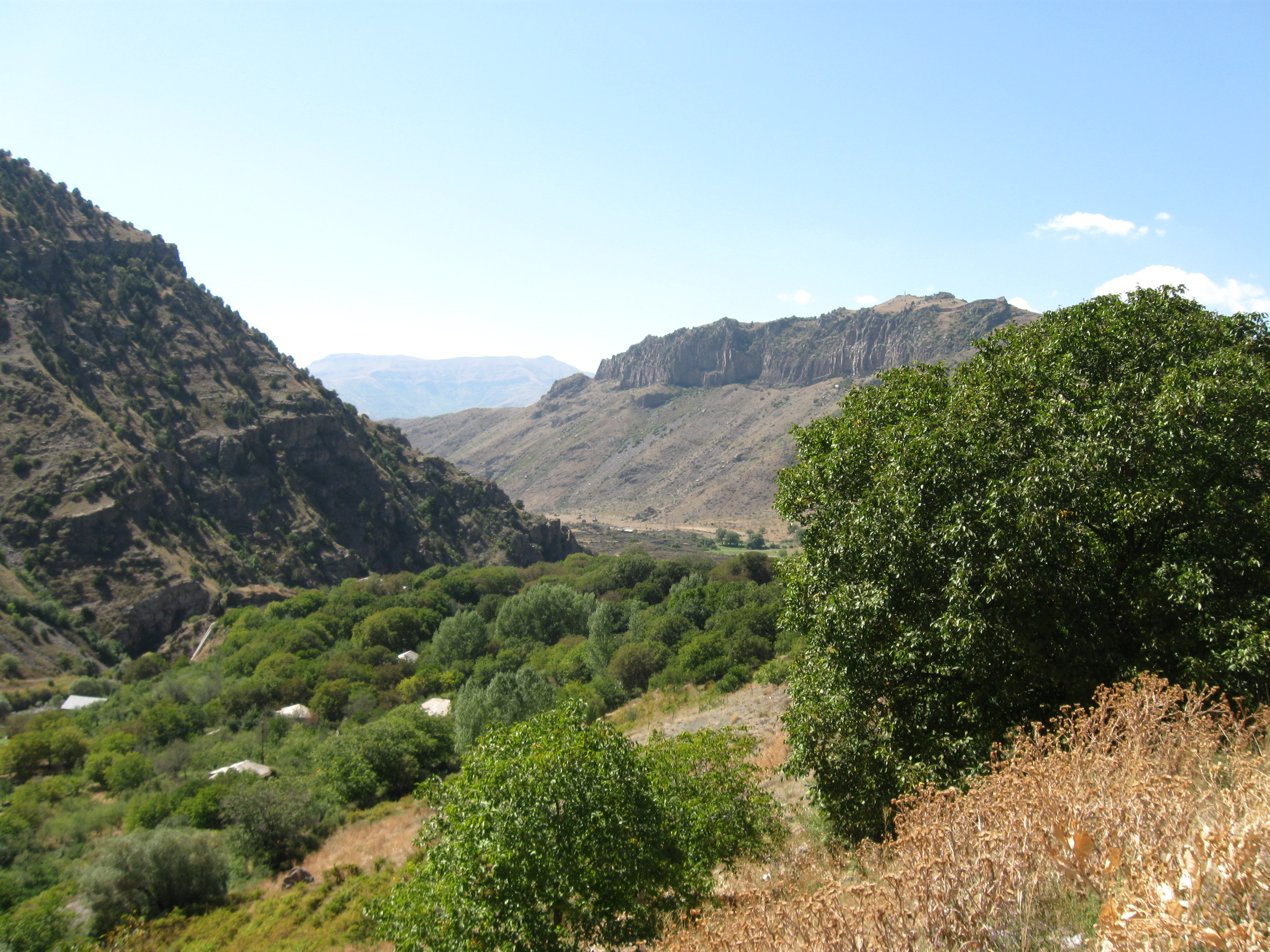
Scenery

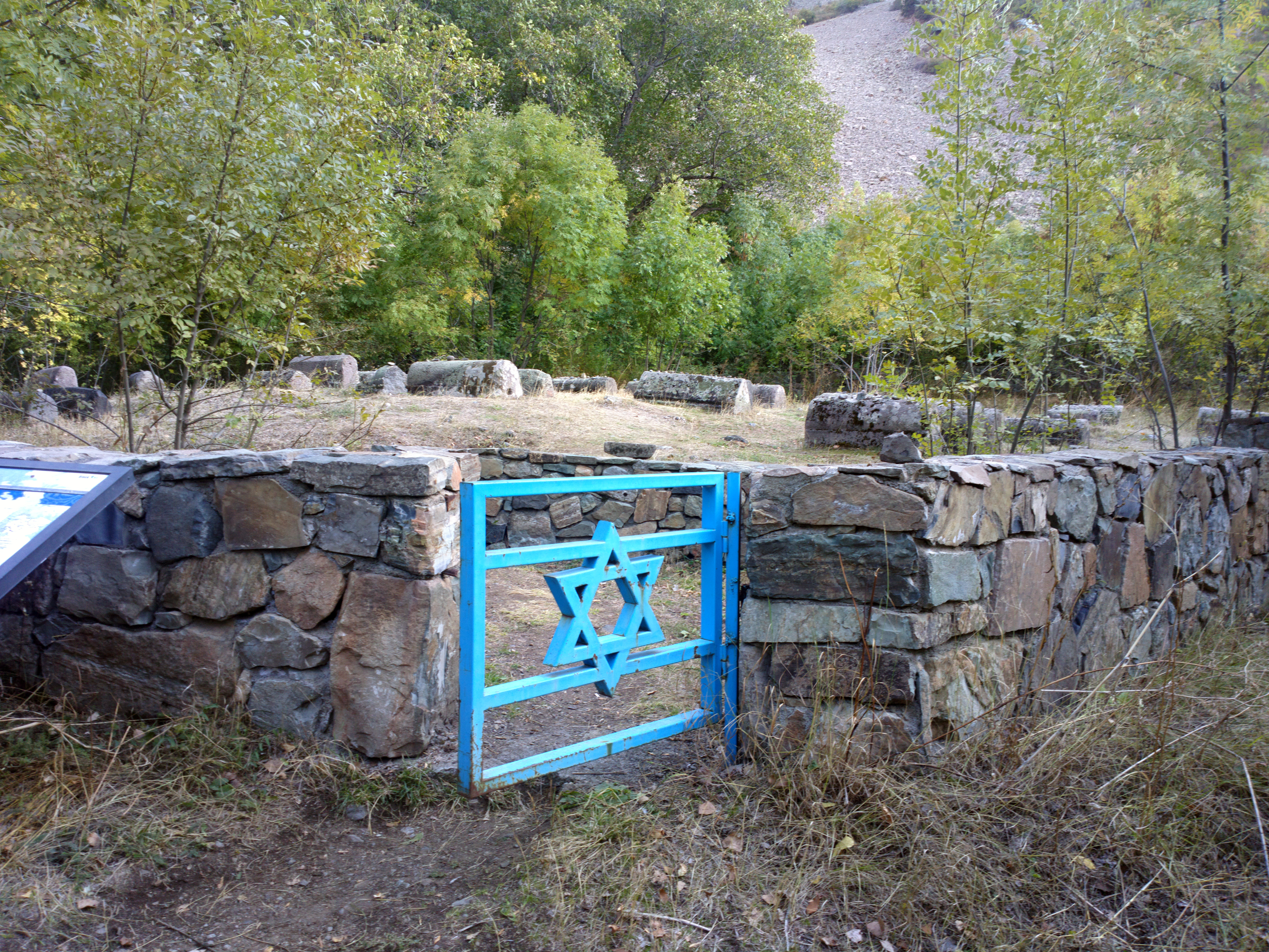
Jewish cemetery in Yeghegis

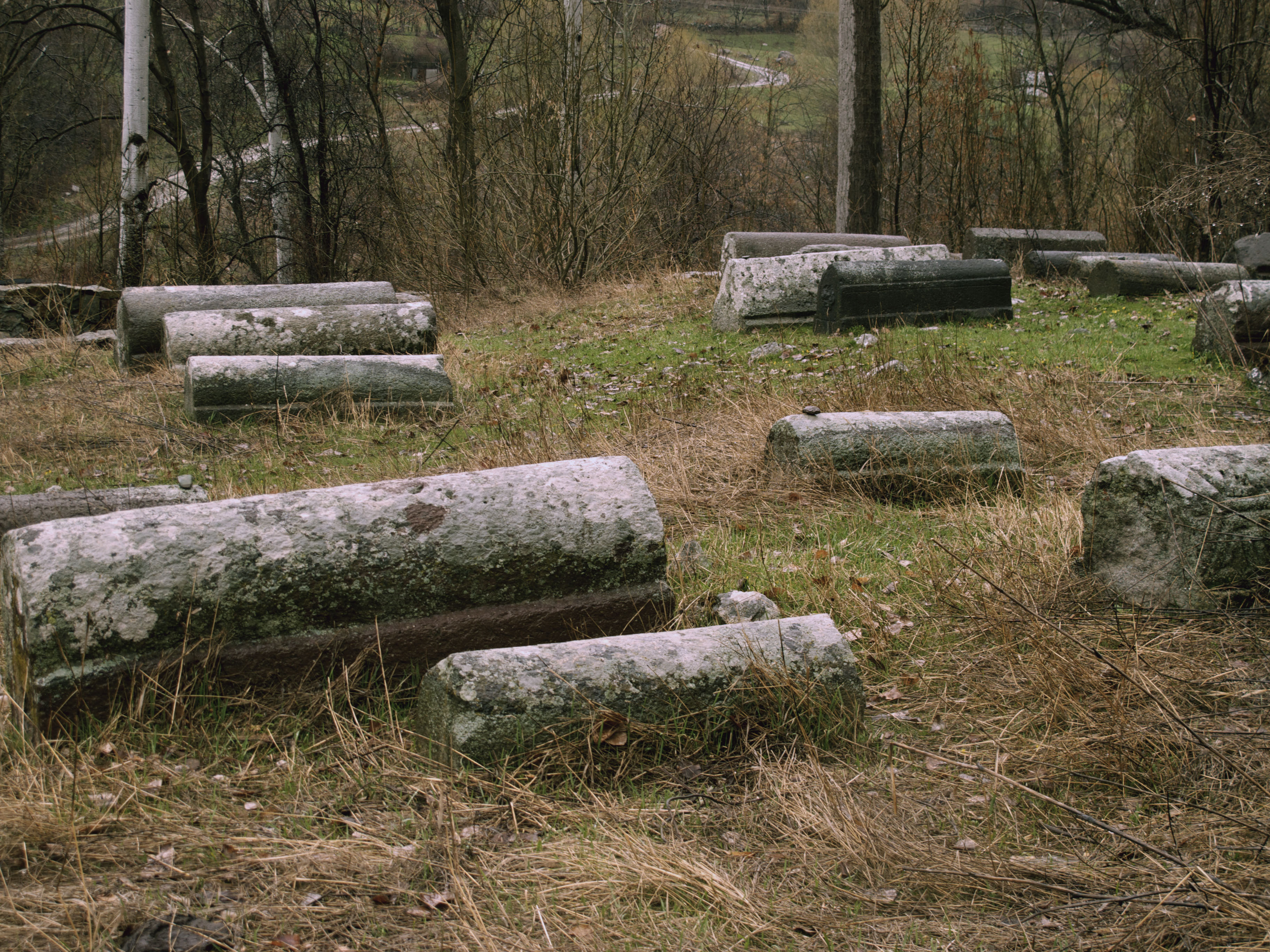
Jewish cemetery in Yeghegis

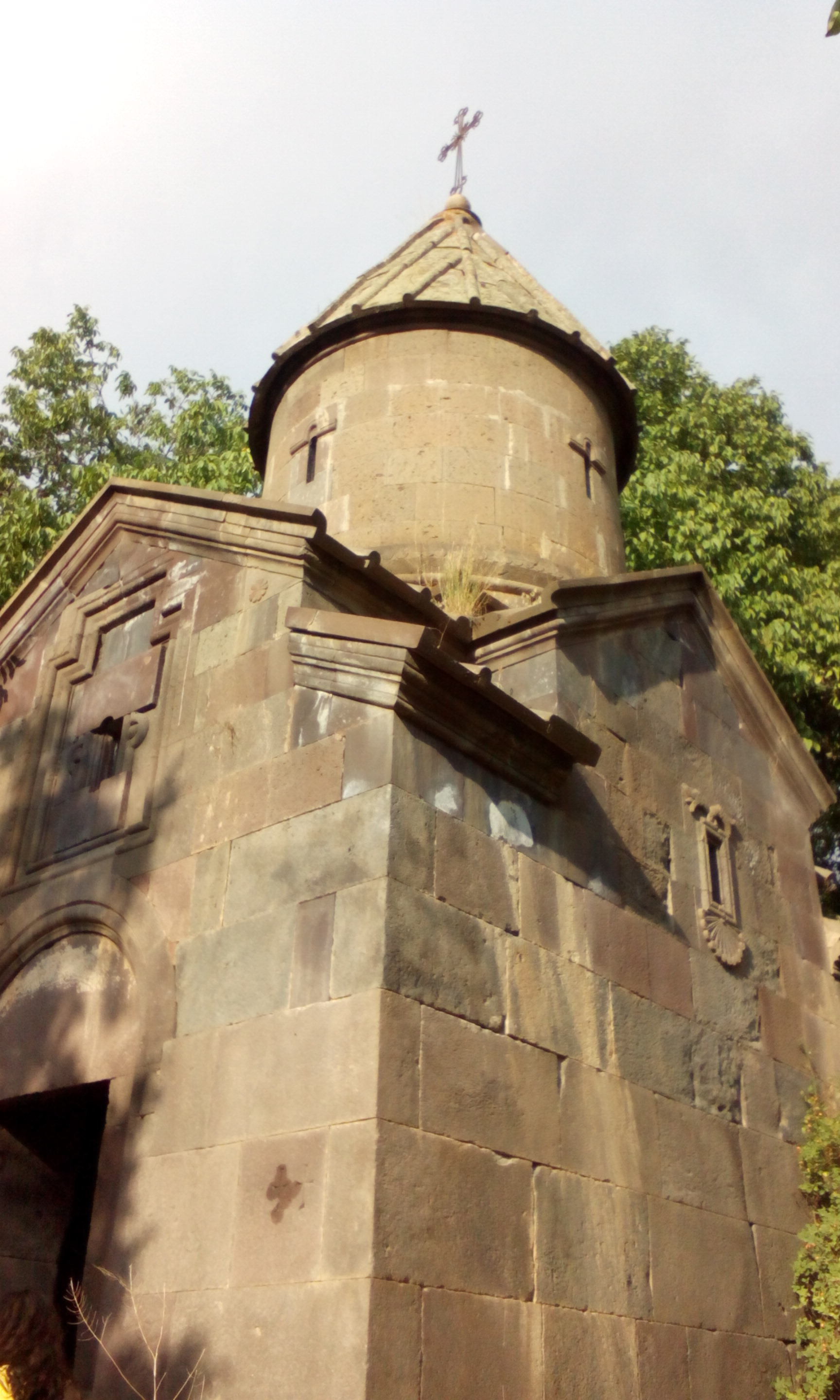
St. Nshan Church

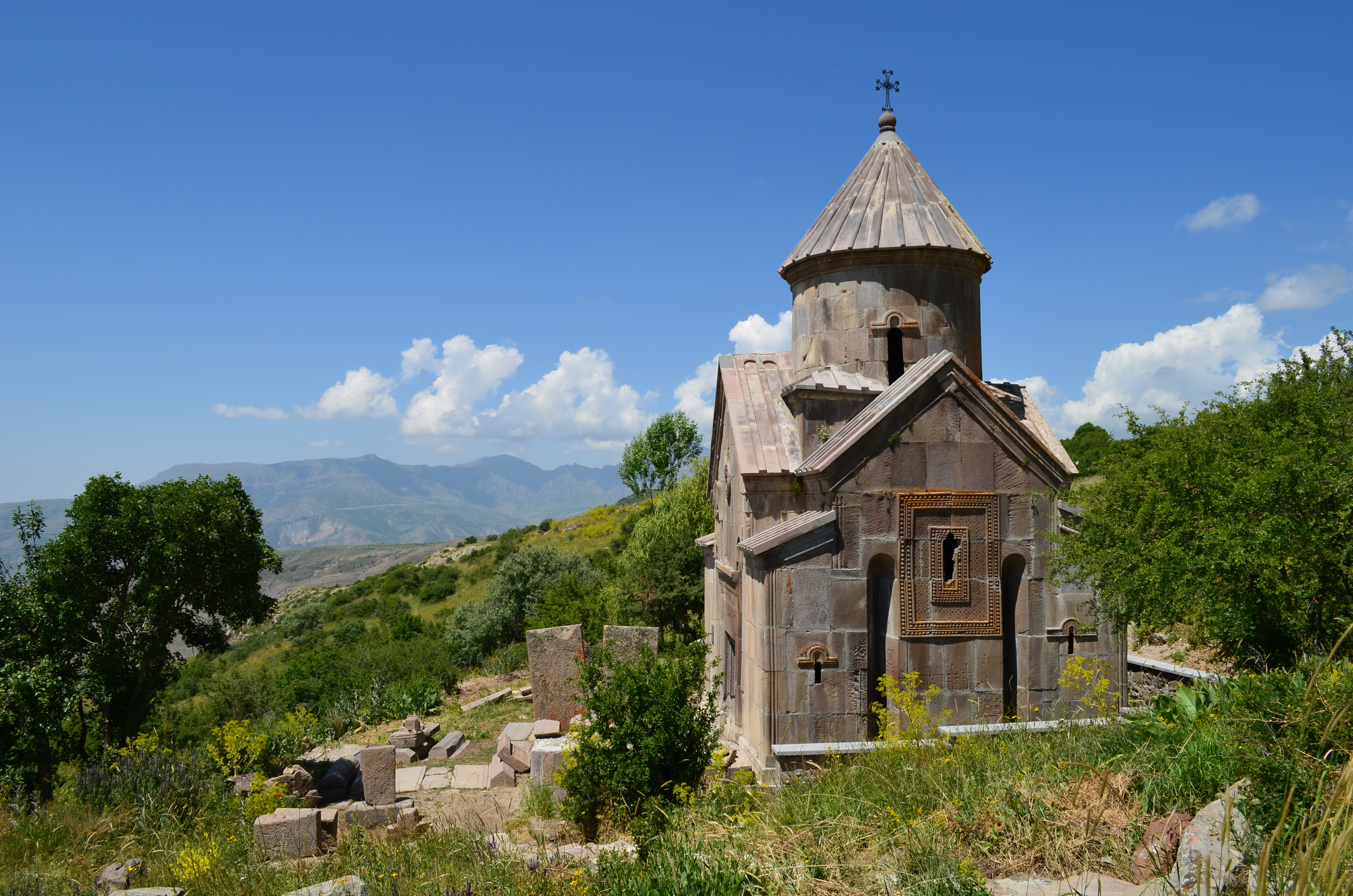
Tsaghats Kar Monastery

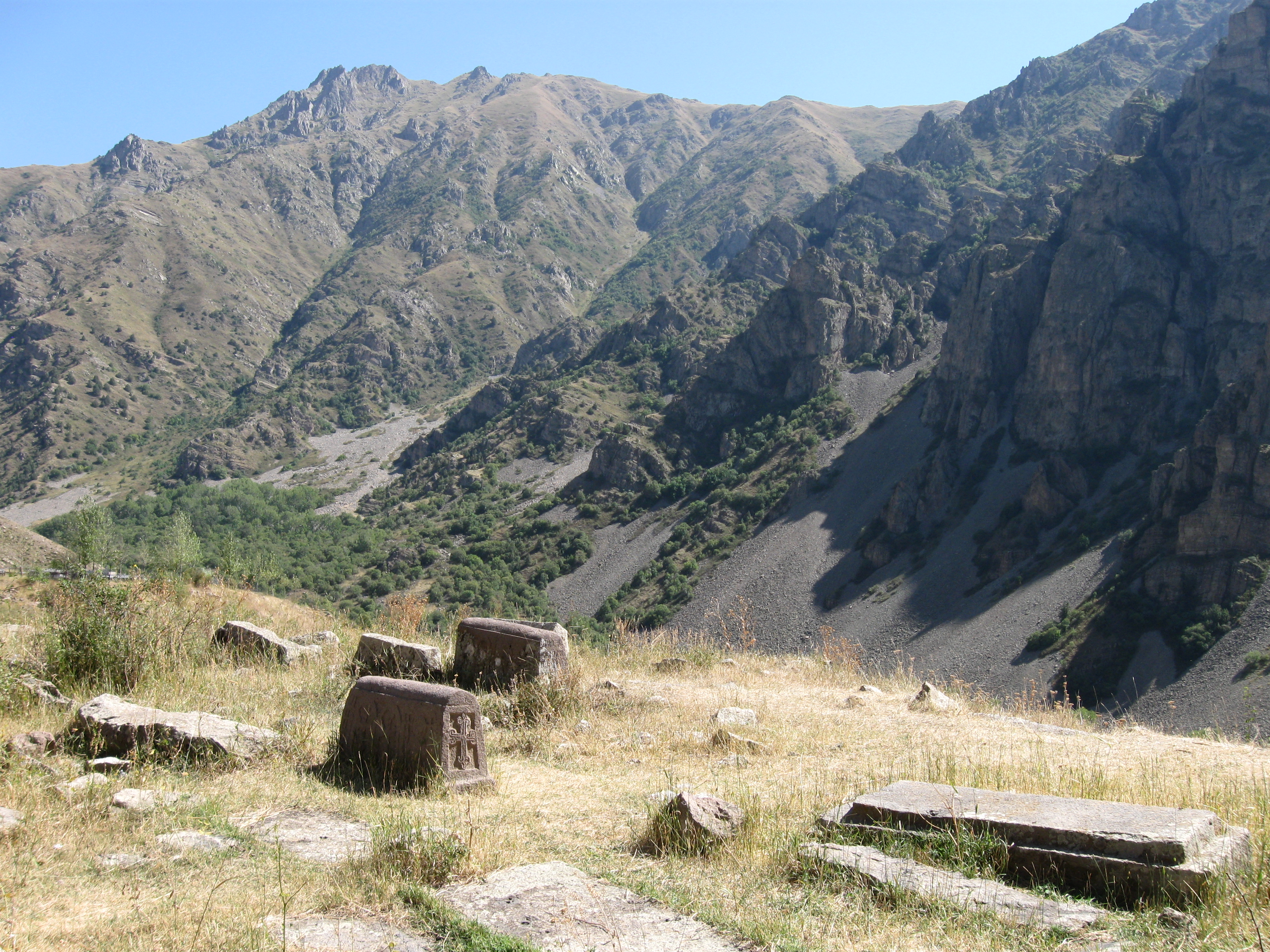
Yeghegis old cemetery

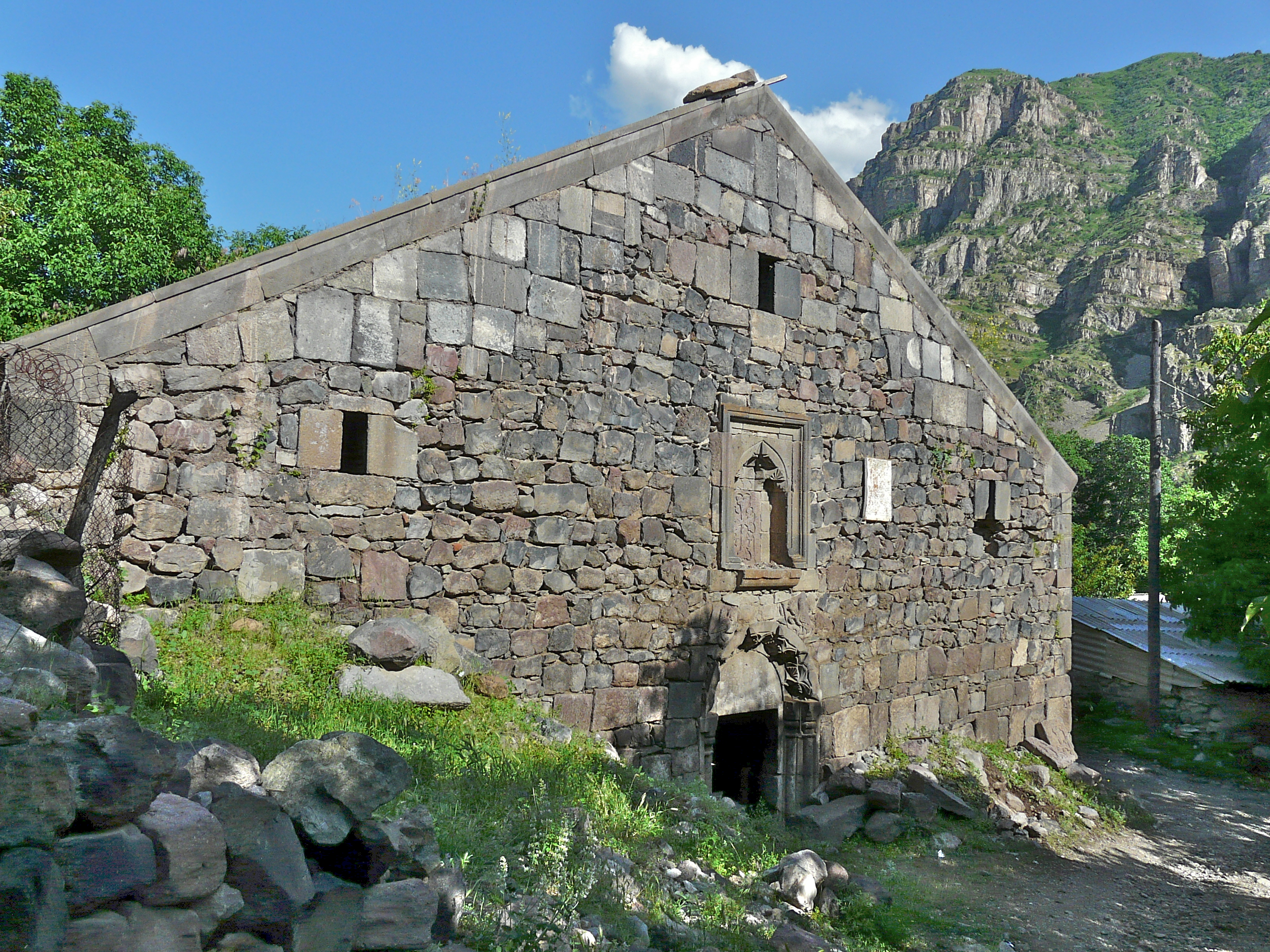
St. Astvatsatsin Chapel (built in 1703)

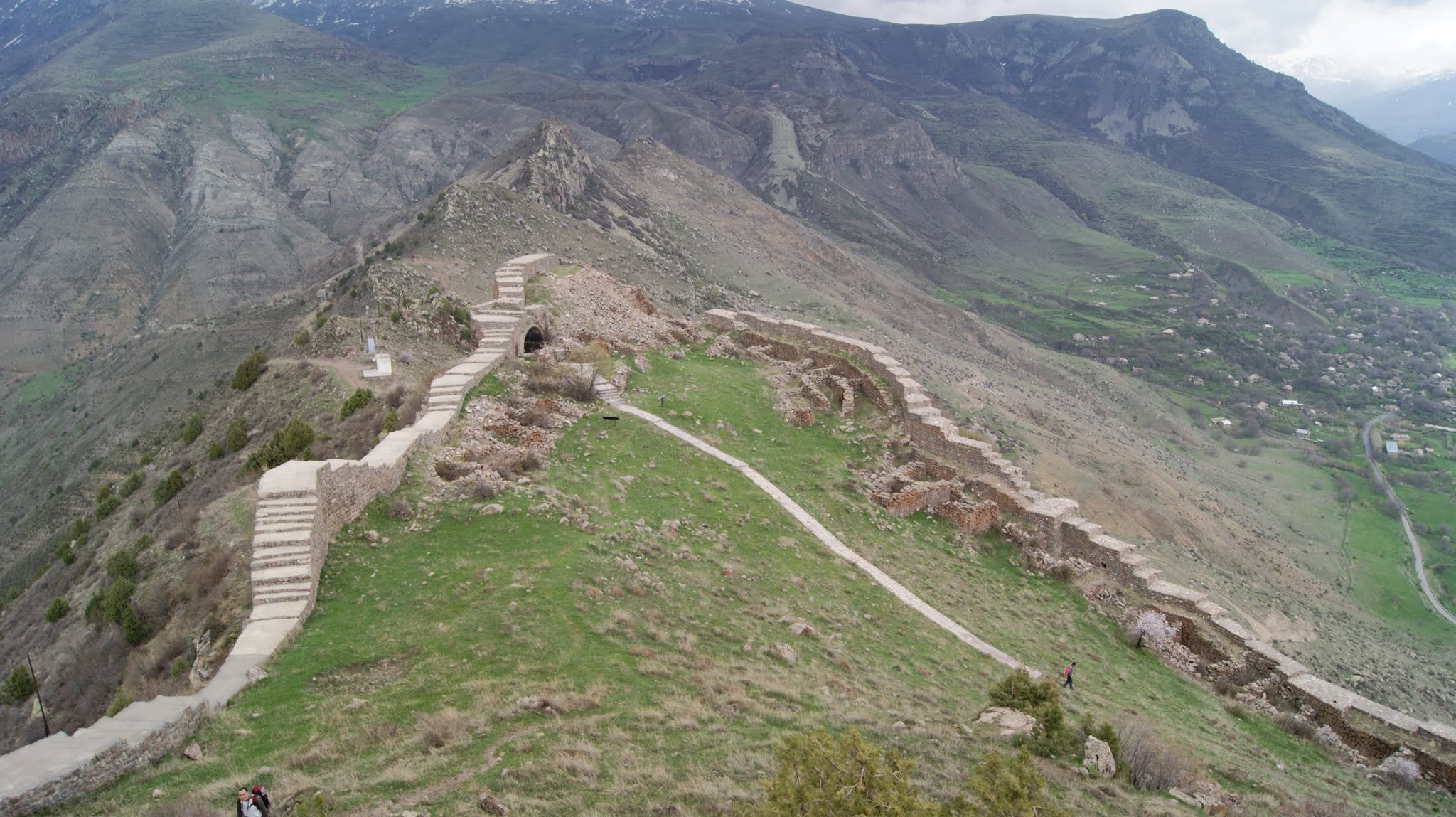
Smbataberd

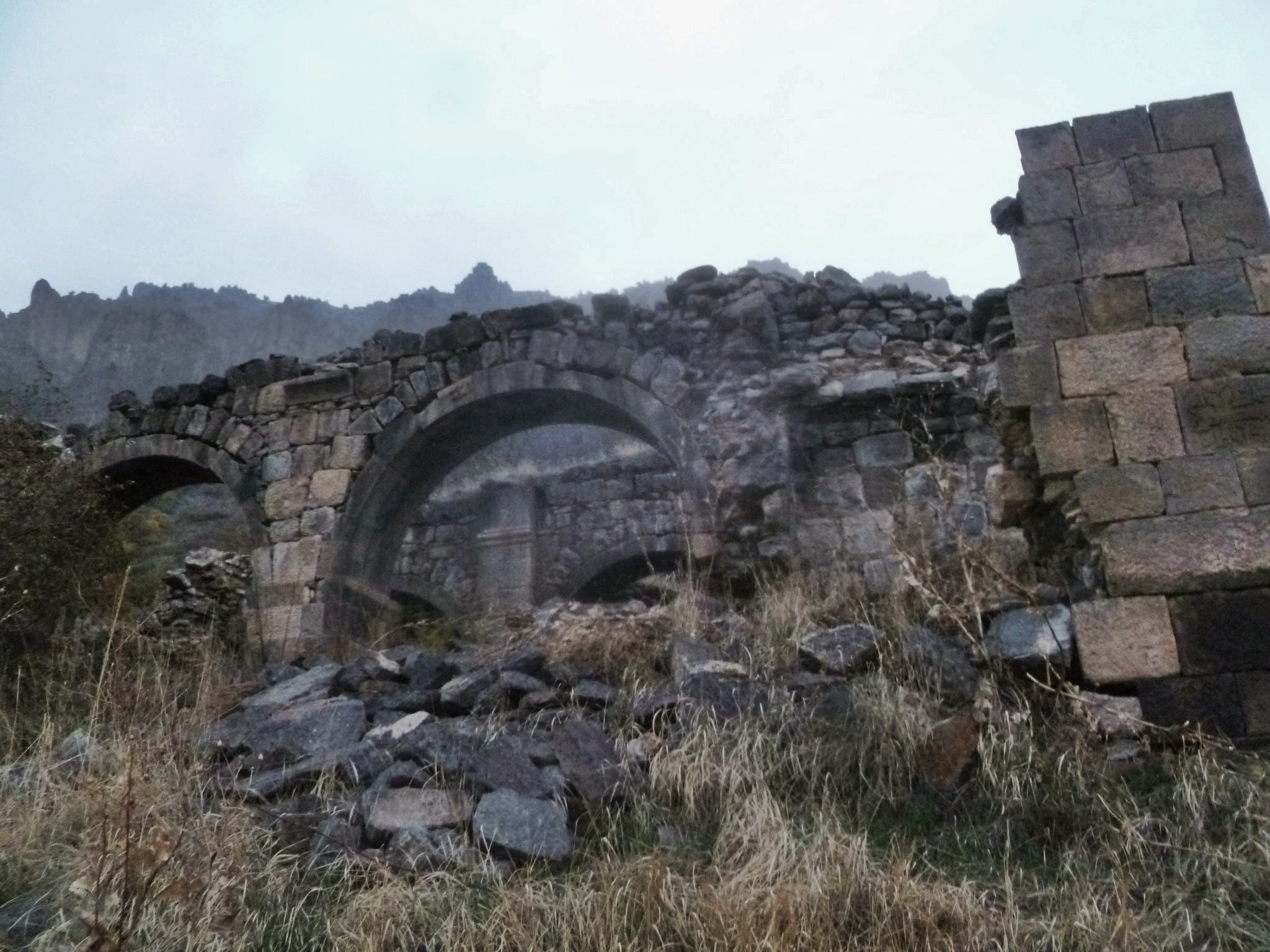
Hermon Monastery

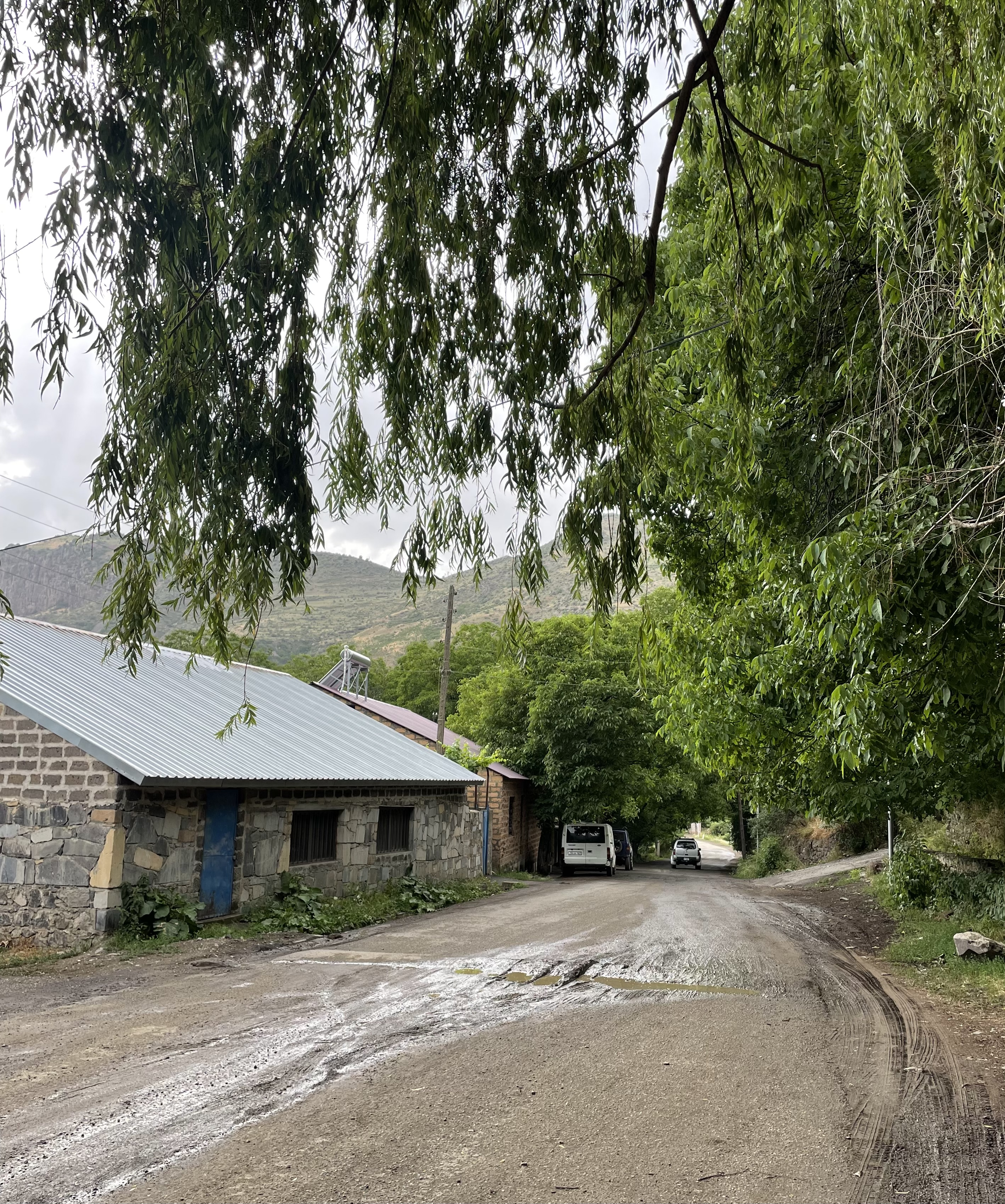
Main village street

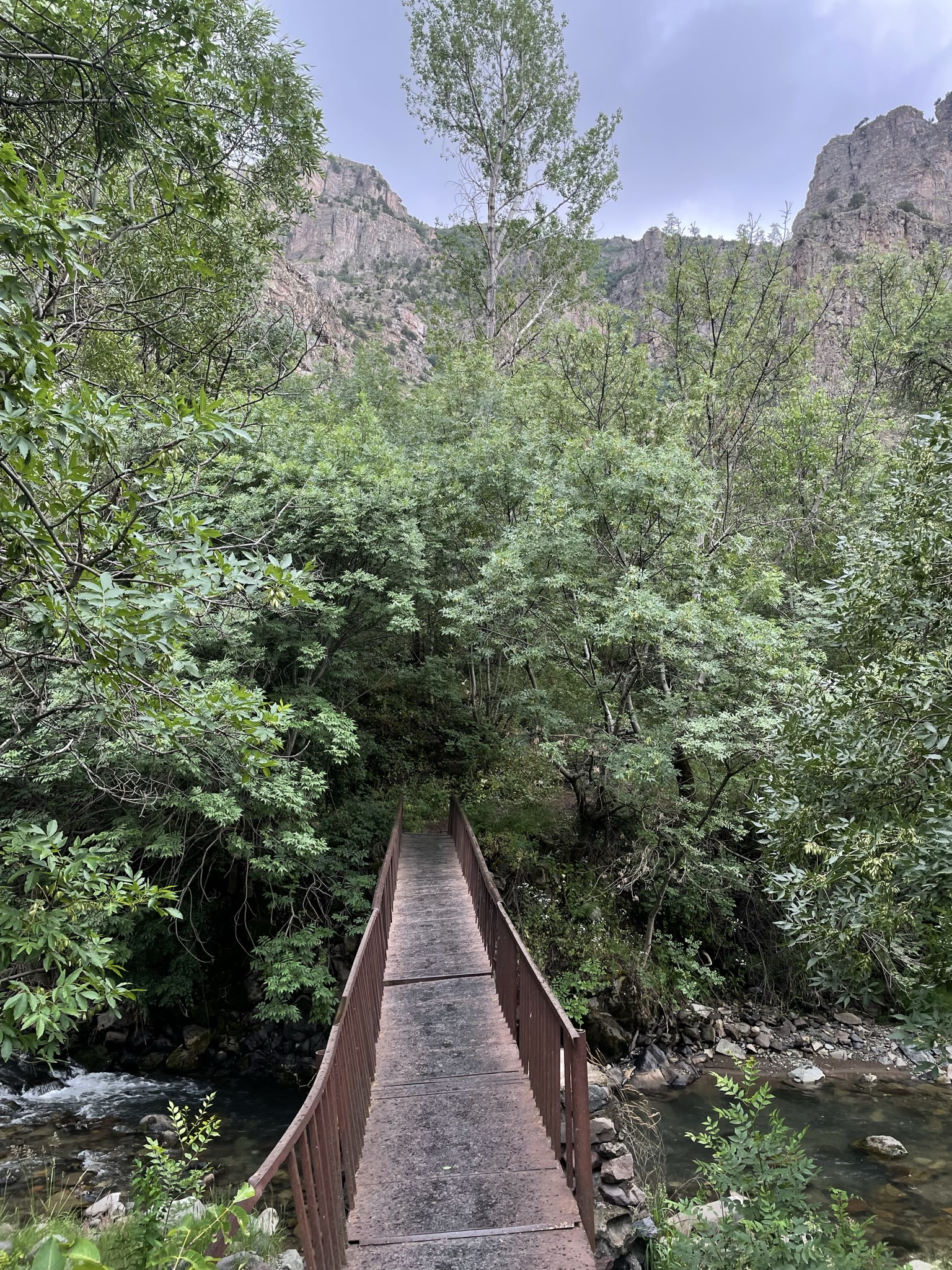
Bridge that connects Yeghegis and the Jewish cemetery

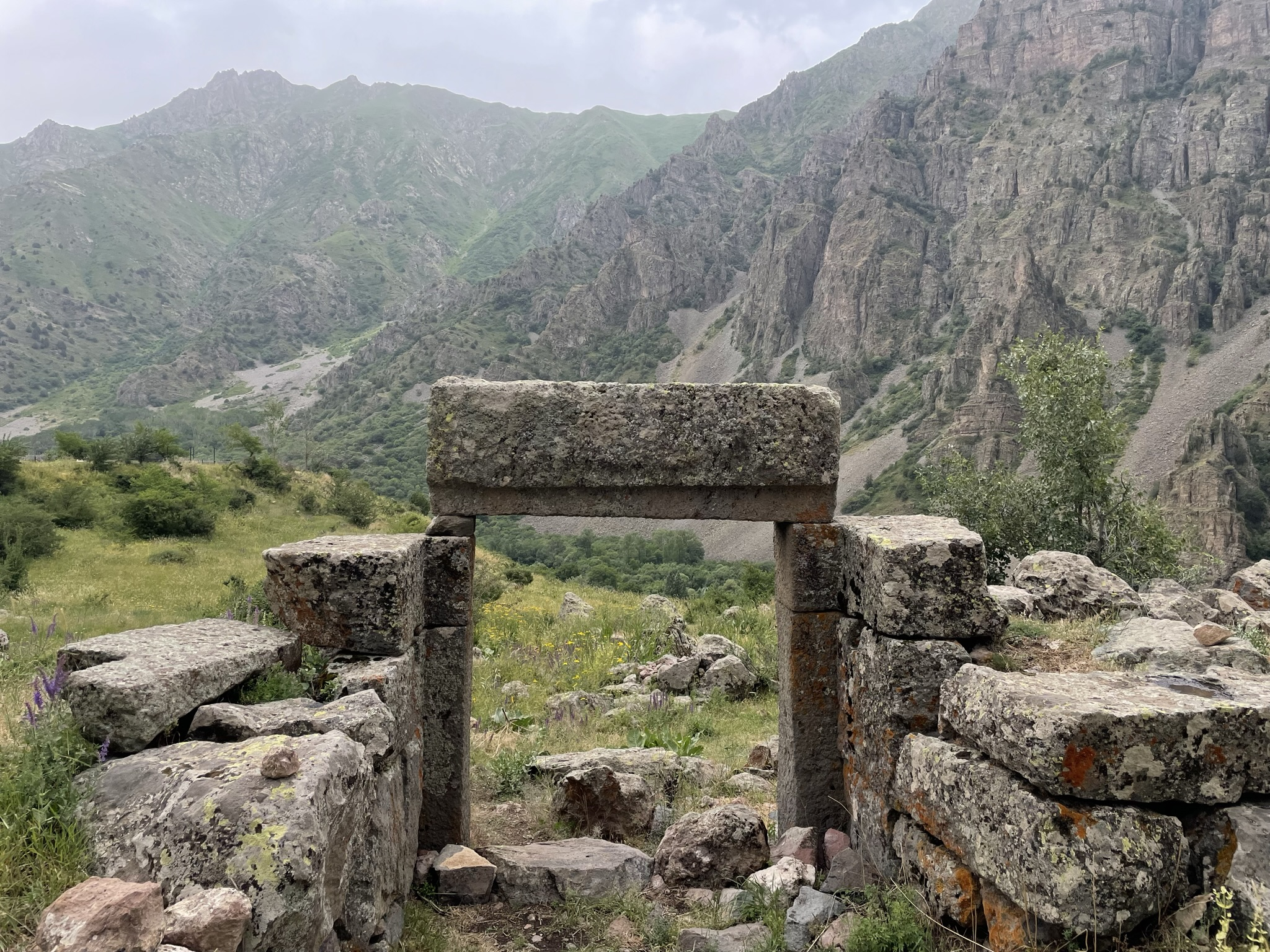
Megalith near Zorats church
