= Aragats, Aragatsotn =

Aragats Արագած
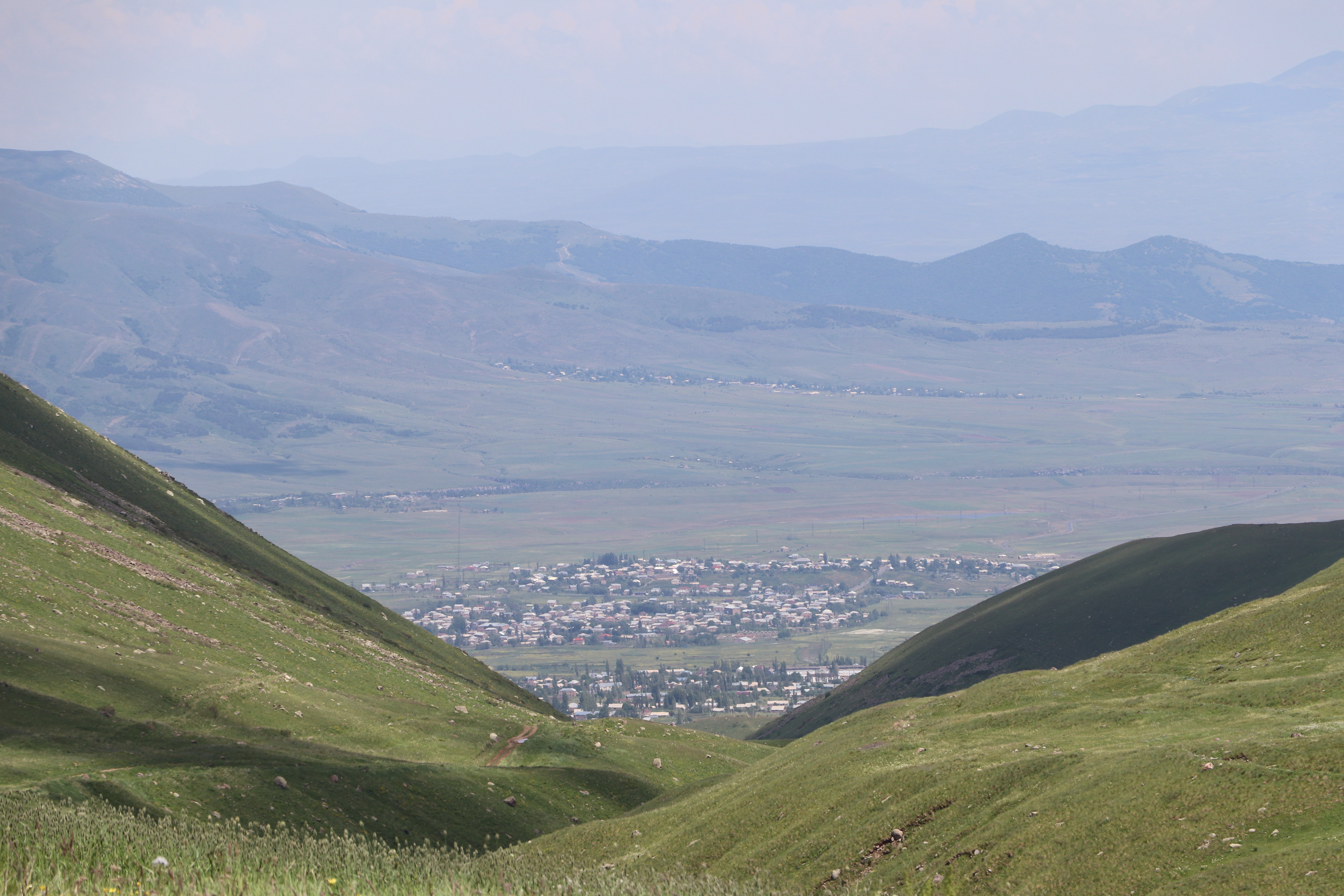

- Location within Armenia Location within Aragatsotn
- Coordinates: 40°29′19″N 44°21′16″E
- Country: Armenia
- Province: Aragatsotn
- Municipality: Aparan

Population (2011)
  - Total: 2,773
- Time zone: UTC+4
  - Summer (DST): UTC+5

Aragats (Armenian: Արագած) is a village in the Aparan Municipality of the Aragatsotn Province of Armenia.
