= Alagyaz =

Alagyaz Ալագյազ
- Village and Municipality
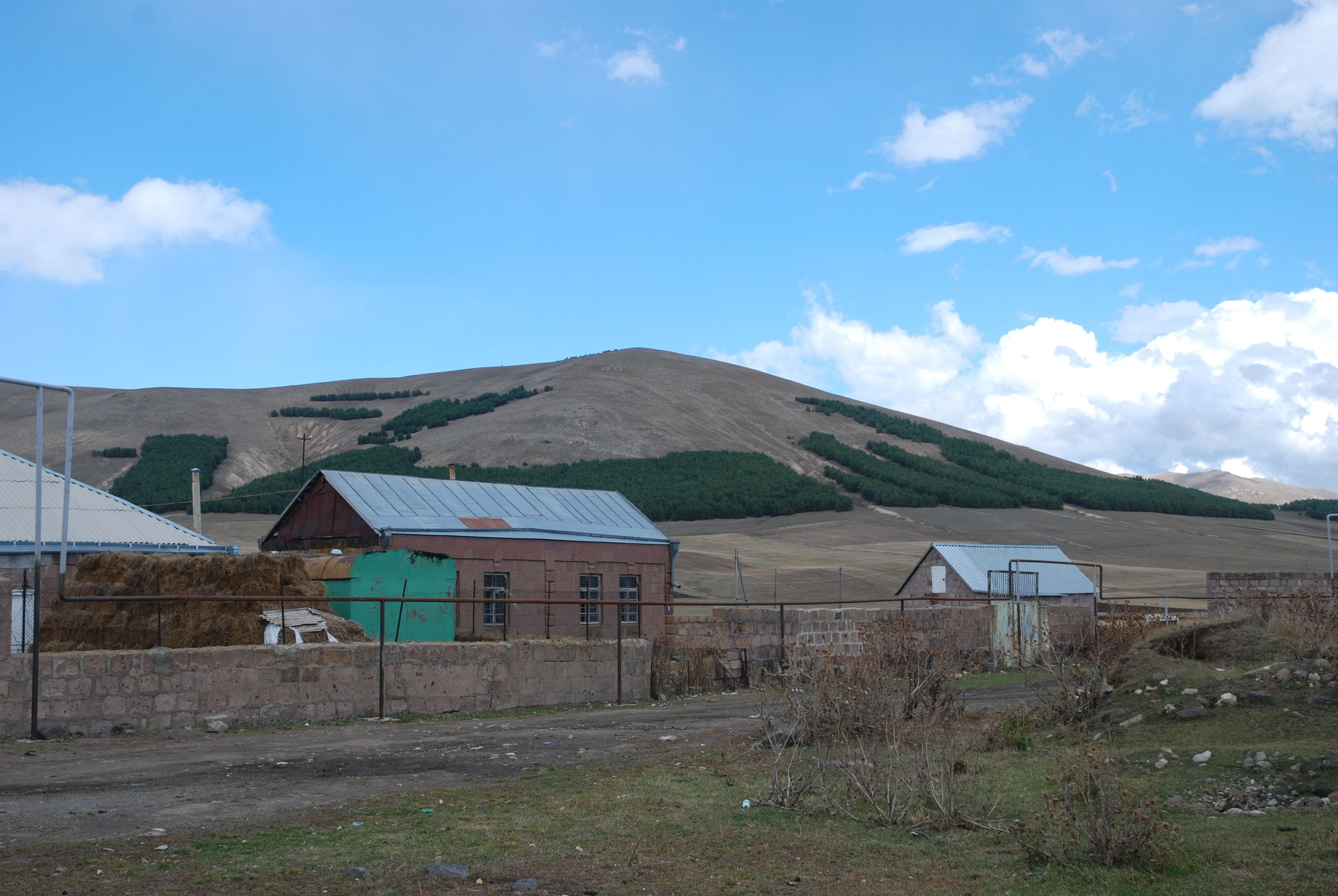
- Alagyaz

- Location within Armenia Location within Aragatsotn
- Coordinates: 40°40′53″N 44°17′25″E
- Country: Armenia
- Province: Aragatsotn
- Municipality: Alagyaz

Population (2011)
  - Total: 439
- Time zone: UTC+4 ( )
  - Summer (DST): UTC+5 ( )

Alagyaz (Armenian: Ալագյազ; Kurdish: Elegez) is a village and centre of the Alagyaz Municipality of the Aragatsotn Province of Armenia. Most of the population are Yazidi Kurds . The village is located along the Aparan-Spitak highway.

== History ==
The settlement was founded in the 19th century. Between 1828 and 1829, a few Armenian families moved to the village from Mush and Aintab. It was known as Mets Jamshlu until it was renamed to its present name in 1938. From 1938 to 1949, it served as the center of the Alagyaz region of the Armenian SSR. During Soviet times, the community was mostly agricultural engaged in grain cultivation and working at the local Soviet dairy factory. By 1970, the village had a cheese factory, secondary school, hospital, pharmacy, cultural center, library, veterinary clinic, communication department, and a cinema. In 1937, the first ever state-sponsored Kurdish theatre was founded in the Alagyaz village of Armenia. On March 15, 1972, the village became part of the Aragats district of the Armenian SSR. Alagyaz is known as the cultural centre of Kurds in Armenia, producing over 20 scientists, artists and 2 academicians.
