= Aragatsavan =

Village in Aragatsotn, Armenia

Aragatsavan Արագածավան
- Location within Armenia Location within Aragatsotn
- Coordinates: 40°19′59″N 43°39′29″E
- Country: Armenia
- Province: Aragatsotn
- Municipality: Aragatsavan
- Founded: 1924

Population (2011)
  - Total: 5,310
- Time zone: UTC+4

Aragatsavan (Armenian: Արագածավան) is a village in the Aragatsavan Municipality of the Aragatsotn Province of Armenia near the Armenia–Turkey border.

== Notable people ==
- Stella Grigoryan, artist, sculptor, teacher
